= List of Arizona Wildcats baseball seasons =

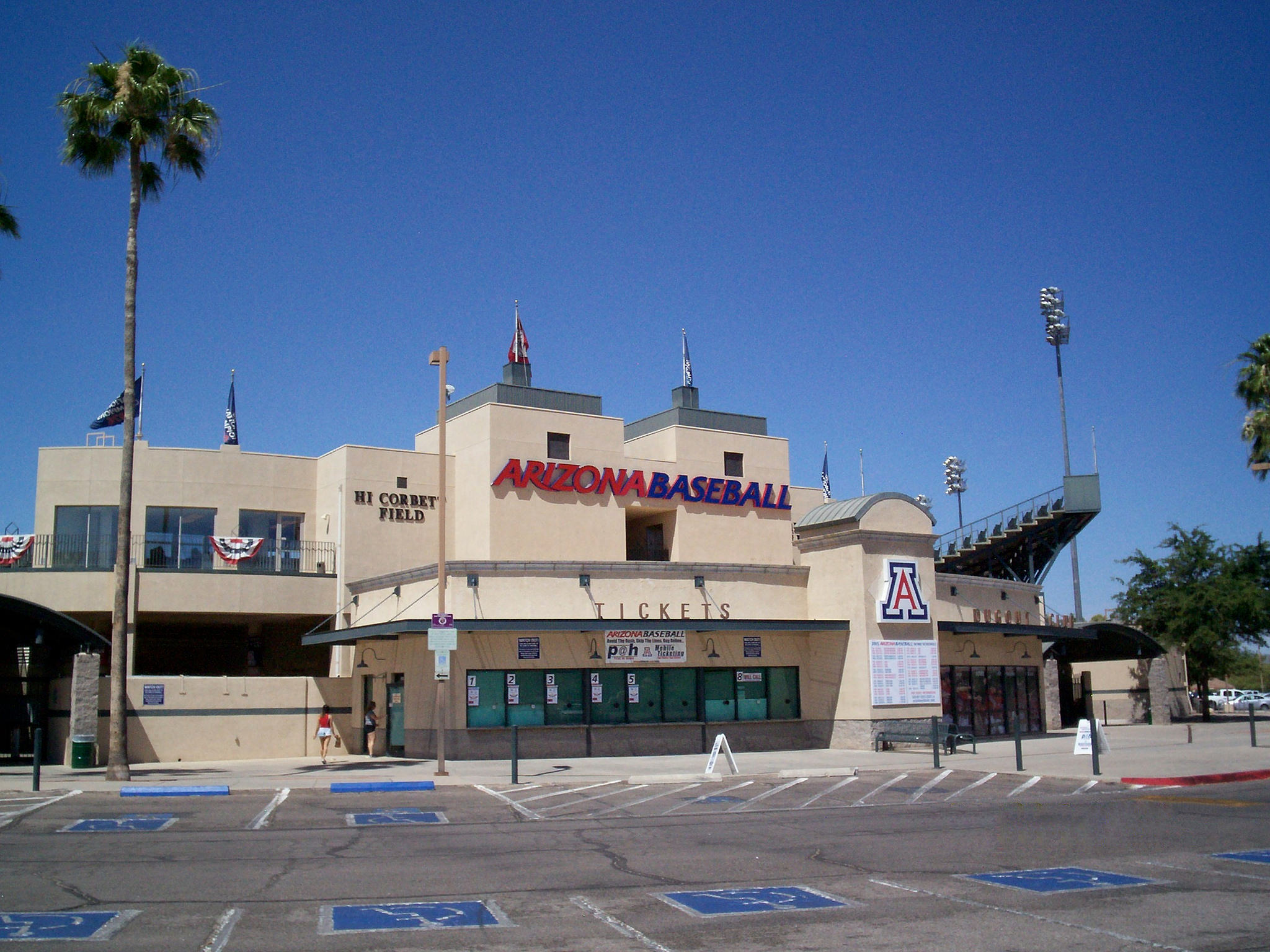
Hi Corbett Field

This is a list of Arizona Wildcats baseball seasons. The Arizona Wildcats baseball program is a college baseball team that represents the University of Arizona in the Pac-12 Conference in the National Collegiate Athletic Association. The Wildcats have played their home games at Hi Corbett Field in Tucson, Arizona since 2012. Prior to that, the Wildcats played their home games at Jerry Kindall Field at Frank Sancet Stadium from 1967-2011 and UA Field from 1929-1966.

The Wildcats are regarded as one of the most successful programs in college baseball history, having won 4 College World Series championships - tied for 4th most all-time. They have appeared in the College World Series 19 times - tied for 7th most all-time - and have made the NCAA tournament 42 times - 6th most all-time. They have been the National Runner-Up 4 times.

== Season Results ==
| National champions | College World Series berth | NCAA tournament berth | Conference Tournament champions | Conference/Division Regular season Champions |

| Season | Head coach | Conference (Note: Arizona was a member of the Border Conference from 1931 until 1962. Arizona joined the Western Athletic Conference in 1963 and were members until 1978. From 1978 to 2024, Arizona was a member of the Pacific-10/Pac-12 Conference. Since 2025, Arizona has been a member of the Big 12 Conference) | Season results | | | | | | | | | Tournament results | | Final poll (Note: Collegiate Baseball began team rankings in 1959. Baseball America began during the 1981 season. The Coaches' Poll (published by USA Today's Sports Weekly and ESPN) began publishing its rankings during the 1992 season.) | | |
| Season | Head coach | Conference | Overall | | | | Conference | | | | | Conference (Note: The Western Athletic Conference sponsored a Best-of-3 Playoff between division champions from 1963-1981. The Pac-12 Conference began a baseball tournament in 2022.) | Postseason (Note: Postseason play involving the NCAA Division I Baseball Championship began in 1947.) | BA | CB | Coaches |
| Season | Head coach | Conference | Wins | Losses | Ties | % | Wins | Losses | Ties | % | Finish (Note: From 1963–1998 the South Division finish is listed.) | Conference | Postseason | BA | CB | Coaches |
|---|---|---|---|---|---|---|---|---|---|---|---|---|---|---|---|---|
Arizona Wildcats
| 1904 | B.L. Cosgrave | Independent | 6 | 1 | 0 | .857 | N/A | | | | | N/A | N/A | N/A | N/A | N/A |
| 1905 | R. Newton | Independent | 2 | 2 | 0 | .500 | N/A | | | | | N/A | N/A | N/A | N/A | N/A |
| 1906 | B.R. Hatcher | Independent | 2 | 0 | 0 | 1.000 | N/A | | | | | N/A | N/A | N/A | N/A | N/A |
| 1907 | R. Newton | Independent | 5 | 4 | 0 | .555 | N/A | | | | | N/A | N/A | N/A | N/A | N/A |
| 1908 | B.R. Hatcher | Independent | 10 | 2 | 0 | .833 | N/A | | | | | N/A | N/A | N/A | N/A | N/A |
| 1909 | Dan Farrish | Independent | 8 | 4 | 0 | .666 | N/A | | | | | N/A | N/A | N/A | N/A | N/A |
| 1910 | R. Rigg | Independent | 2 | 5 | 0 | .286 | N/A | | | | | N/A | N/A | N/A | N/A | N/A |
| 1911 | William Honley | Independent | 2 | 4 | 0 | .333 | N/A | | | | | N/A | N/A | N/A | N/A | N/A |
| 1912 | Joe Collins | Independent | 7 | 4 | 0 | .636 | N/A | | | | | N/A | N/A | N/A | N/A | N/A |
| 1913 | R.L. Quigley | Independent | 1 | 0 | 0 | 1.000 | N/A | | | | | N/A | N/A | N/A | N/A | N/A |
| 1914 | C.R. Stewart | Independent | 4 | 4 | 0 | .500 | N/A | | | | | N/A | N/A | N/A | N/A | N/A |
| 1915 | Pop McKale | Independent | 5 | 3 | 0 | .625 | N/A | | | | | N/A | N/A | N/A | N/A | N/A |
| 1916 | Pop McKale | Independent | 6 | 2 | 0 | .750 | N/A | | | | | N/A | N/A | N/A | N/A | N/A |
| 1917 | Pop McKale | Independent | 4 | 2 | 0 | .666 | N/A | | | | | N/A | N/A | N/A | N/A | N/A |
| 1918 | Pop McKale | Independent | 0 | 1 | 0 | .000 | N/A | | | | | N/A | N/A | N/A | N/A | N/A |
| 1919 | Pop McKale | Independent | 3 | 3 | 0 | .500 | N/A | | | | | N/A | N/A | N/A | N/A | N/A |
| 1920 | W.A. Porter | Independent | 11 | 4 | 0 | .733 | N/A | | | | | N/A | N/A | N/A | N/A | N/A |
| 1921 | W.A. Porter | Independent | 7 | 1 | 0 | .875 | N/A | | | | | N/A | N/A | N/A | N/A | N/A |
| 1922 | Pop McKale | Independent | 6 | 1 | 2 | .666 | N/A | | | | | N/A | N/A | N/A | N/A | N/A |
| 1923 | Pop McKale | Independent | 9 | 1 | 0 | .900 | N/A | | | | | N/A | N/A | N/A | N/A | N/A |
| 1924 | Pop McKale | Independent | 7 | 1 | 0 | .875 | N/A | | | | | N/A | N/A | N/A | N/A | N/A |
| 1925 | Pop McKale | Independent | 9 | 2 | 0 | .818 | N/A | | | | | N/A | N/A | N/A | N/A | N/A |
| 1926 | Pop McKale | Independent | 9 | 4 | 0 | .692 | N/A | | | | | N/A | N/A | N/A | N/A | N/A |
| 1927 | Pop McKale | Independent | 10 | 6 | 0 | .625 | N/A | | | | | N/A | N/A | N/A | N/A | N/A |
| 1928 | Pop McKale | Independent | 5 | 3 | 1 | .555 | N/A | | | | | N/A | N/A | N/A | N/A | N/A |
| 1929 | Pop McKale | Independent | 5 | 5 | 0 | .500 | N/A | | | | | N/A | N/A | N/A | N/A | N/A |
| 1930 | Pop McKale | Independent | 6 | 8 | 0 | .429 | N/A | | | | | N/A | N/A | N/A | N/A | N/A |
| 1931 | Pop McKale | Independent | No Team | | | | | | | | | N/A | N/A | N/A | N/A | N/A |
| 1932 | Pop McKale | Border Conference | 4 | 4 | 0 | .500 | Incomplete Records | | | | | N/A | N/A | N/A | N/A | N/A |
| 1933 | Pop McKale | Border Conference | 8 | 6 | 0 | .571 | Incomplete Records | | | | | N/A | N/A | N/A | N/A | N/A |
| 1934 | Pop McKale | Border Conference | 17 | 4 | 0 | .810 | Incomplete Records | | | | | N/A | N/A | N/A | N/A | N/A |
| 1935 | Pop McKale | Border Conference | 19 | 1 | 0 | .950 | Incomplete Records | | | | | N/A | N/A | N/A | N/A | N/A |
| 1936 | Pop McKale | Border Conference | 19 | 4 | 0 | .826 | Incomplete Records | | | | | N/A | N/A | N/A | N/A | N/A |
| 1937 | Pop McKale | Border Conference | 18 | 2 | 0 | .900 | Incomplete Records | | | | | N/A | N/A | N/A | N/A | N/A |
| 1938 | Pop McKale | Border Conference | 15 | 2 | 2 | .789 | Incomplete Records | | | | | N/A | N/A | N/A | N/A | N/A |
| 1939 | Pop McKale | Border Conference | 11 | 7 | 0 | .611 | Incomplete Records | | | | | N/A | N/A | N/A | N/A | N/A |
| 1940 | Pop McKale | Border Conference | 11 | 5 | 1 | .647 | Incomplete Records | | | | | N/A | N/A | N/A | N/A | N/A |
| 1941 | Pop McKale | Border Conference | 10 | 9 | 1 | .500 | Incomplete Records | | | | | N/A | N/A | N/A | N/A | N/A |
| 1942 | Pop McKale | Border Conference | 18 | 1 | 0 | .947 | Incomplete Records | | | | | N/A | N/A | N/A | N/A | N/A |
| 1943 | Pop McKale | Border Conference | 12 | 10 | 0 | .545 | Incomplete Records | | | | | N/A | N/A | N/A | N/A | N/A |
| 1944 | Pop McKale | Border Conference | No Team due to WWII | | | | | | | | | N/A | N/A | N/A | N/A | N/A |
| 1945 | Pop McKale | Border Conference | No Team due to WWII | | | | | | | | | N/A | N/A | N/A | N/A | N/A |
| 1946 | Pop McKale | Border Conference | 10 | 3 | 0 | .769 | Incomplete Records | | | | | N/A | N/A | N/A | N/A | N/A |
| 1947 | Pop McKale | Border Conference | 15 | 4 | 0 | .789 | Incomplete Records | | | | | N/A | — | N/A | N/A | N/A |
| 1948 | Pop McKale | Border Conference | 19 | 8 | 0 | .703 | Incomplete Records | | | | | N/A | — | N/A | N/A | N/A |
| 1949 | Pop McKale | Border Conference | 12 | 6 | 0 | .666 | Incomplete Records | | | | | N/A | — | N/A | N/A | N/A |
| 1950 | Frank Sancet | Border Conference | 28 | 6 | 1 | .800 | Incomplete Records | | | | | N/A | District 6 Regional | N/A | N/A | N/A |
| 1951 | Frank Sancet | Border Conference | 28 | 4 | 0 | .875 | Incomplete Records | | | | | N/A | District 6 Regional | N/A | N/A | N/A |
| 1952 | Frank Sancet | Border Conference | 22 | 14 | 0 | .611 | Incomplete Records | | | | | N/A | District 6 Regional | N/A | N/A | N/A |
| 1953 | Frank Sancet | Border Conference | 21 | 16 | 0 | .567 | Incomplete Records | | | | | N/A | District 6 Regional | N/A | N/A | N/A |
| 1954 | Frank Sancet | Border Conference | 40 | 9 | 0 | .816 | Incomplete Records | | | | | N/A | College World Series | N/A | N/A | N/A |
| 1955 | Frank Sancet | Border Conference | 41 | 8 | 0 | .837 | Incomplete Records | | | | | N/A | College World Series | N/A | N/A | N/A |
| 1956 | Frank Sancet | Border Conference | 49 | 8 | 0 | .860 | Incomplete Records | | | | | N/A | College World Series Runner-Up | N/A | N/A | N/A |
| 1957 | Frank Sancet | Border Conference | 34 | 12 | 0 | .739 | Incomplete Records | | | | | N/A | District 6 Regional | N/A | N/A | N/A |
| 1958 | Frank Sancet | Border Conference | 38 | 14 | 0 | .731 | Incomplete Records | | | | | N/A | College World Series | N/A | N/A | N/A |
| 1959 | Frank Sancet | Border Conference | 39 | 10 | 2 | .765 | Incomplete Records | | | | | N/A | College World Series Runner-Up | N/A | 2 | N/A |
| 1960 | Frank Sancet | Border Conference | 43 | 9 | 0 | .827 | Incomplete Records | | | | | N/A | College World Series | N/A | 3 | N/A |
| 1961 | Frank Sancet | Border Conference | 41 | 9 | 0 | .820 | Incomplete Records | | | | | N/A | District 6 Regional | N/A | 10 | N/A |
| 1962 | Frank Sancet | Border Conference | 40 | 8 | 2 | .800 | Incomplete Records | | | | | N/A | District 6 Regional | N/A | 19 | N/A |
| 1963 | Frank Sancet | Western Athletic Conference | 39 | 17 | 0 | .696 | 8 | 4 | 0 | .666 | 1st (South) | 1st | College World Series Runner-Up | N/A | 2 | N/A |
| 1964 | Frank Sancet | Western Athletic Conference | 31 | 13 | 1 | .688 | 7 | 5 | 0 | .583 | 2nd (South) | DNQ | — | N/A | 20 | N/A |
| 1965 | Frank Sancet | Western Athletic Conference | 37 | 13 | 0 | .740 | 7 | 5 | 0 | .583 | 2nd (South) | DNQ | — | N/A | 25 | N/A |
| 1966 | Frank Sancet | Western Athletic Conference | 40 | 15 | 0 | .727 | 8 | 4 | 0 | .666 | 1st (South) | 1st | College World Series | N/A | 5 | N/A |
| 1967 | Frank Sancet | Western Athletic Conference | 35 | 15 | 0 | .700 | 7 | 6 | 0 | .538 | 2nd (South) | DNQ | — | N/A | 12 | N/A |
| 1968 | Frank Sancet | Western Athletic Conference | 34 | 17 | 0 | .666 | 6 | 6 | 0 | .500 | 1st (South) | 2nd | — | N/A | 16 | N/A |
| 1969 | Frank Sancet | Western Athletic Conference | 37 | 10 | 0 | .787 | 10 | 8 | 0 | .555 | 2nd (South) | DNQ | — | N/A | 19 | N/A |
| 1970 | Frank Sancet | Western Athletic Conference | 44 | 8 | 0 | .846 | 11 | 7 | 0 | .611 | 1st (South) | 1st | College World Series | N/A | 7 | N/A |
| 1971 | Frank Sancet | Western Athletic Conference | 30 | 18 | 2 | .600 | 10 | 8 | 0 | .555 | 2nd (South) | DNQ | — | N/A | NR | N/A |
| 1972 | Frank Sancet | Western Athletic Conference | 38 | 20 | 0 | .655 | 9 | 9 | 0 | .500 | 2nd (South) | DNQ | — | N/A | NR | N/A |
| 1973 | Jerry Kindall | Western Athletic Conference | 37 | 16 | 0 | .698 | 15 | 5 | 0 | .750 | 2nd (South) | DNQ | — | N/A | 28 | N/A |
| 1974 | Jerry Kindall | Western Athletic Conference | 58 | 6 | 0 | .906 | 16 | 2 | 0 | .888 | 1st (South) | 1st | District 7 Regional | N/A | 9 | N/A |
| 1975 | Jerry Kindall | Western Athletic Conference | 43 | 13 | 1 | .754 | 14 | 4 | 0 | .777 | 2nd (South) | 1st | West Regional | N/A | 13 | N/A |
| 1976 | Jerry Kindall | Western Athletic Conference | 56 | 17 | 0 | .767 | 12 | 6 | 0 | .750 | 2nd (South) | 1st | National champions | N/A | 1 | N/A |
| 1977 | Jerry Kindall | Western Athletic Conference | 38 | 25 | 1 | .594 | 11 | 7 | 0 | .611 | 2nd (South) | DNQ | — | N/A | NR | N/A |
| 1978 | Jerry Kindall | Western Athletic Conference | 43 | 13 | 0 | .768 | 13 | 5 | 0 | .722 | 2nd (South) | 1st | West Regional | N/A | 10 | N/A |
| 1979 | Jerry Kindall | Pacific-10 Conference | 43 | 25 | 0 | .632 | 19 | 13 | 0 | .593 | 2nd (South) | N/A | College World Series | N/A | 5 | N/A |
| 1980 | Jerry Kindall | Pacific-10 Conference | 45 | 21 | 1 | .672 | 17 | 13 | 0 | .566 | T-1st (South) | N/A | National champions | N/A | 1 | N/A |
| 1981 | Jerry Kindall | Pacific-10 Conference | 30 | 22 | 0 | .577 | 14 | 16 | 0 | .466 | 4th (South) | N/A | — | NR | NR | N/A |
| 1982 | Jerry Kindall | Pacific-10 Conference | 32 | 21 | 1 | .604 | 15 | 13 | 1 | .517 | 3rd (South) | N/A | — | NR | NR | N/A |
| 1983 | Jerry Kindall | Pacific-10 Conference | 25 | 31 | 0 | .446 | 13 | 13 | 0 | .500 | 4th (South) | N/A | — | NR | NR | N/A |
| 1984 | Jerry Kindall | Pacific-10 Conference | 22 | 36 | 0 | .379 | 11 | 19 | 0 | .366 | 5th (South) | N/A | — | NR | NR | N/A |
| 1985 | Jerry Kindall | Pacific-10 Conference | 47 | 22 | 0 | .681 | 17 | 13 | 0 | .566 | T-2nd (South) | N/A | College World Series | 4 | 7 | N/A |
| 1986 | Jerry Kindall | Pacific-10 Conference | 49 | 19 | 0 | .721 | 18 | 12 | 0 | .600 | T-2nd (South) | N/A | National champions | 1 | 1 | N/A |
| 1987 | Jerry Kindall | Pacific-10 Conference | 34 | 26 | 0 | .556 | 13 | 17 | 0 | .433 | 4th (South) | N/A | West II Regional | NR | NR | N/A |
| 1988 | Jerry Kindall | Pacific-10 Conference | 33 | 26 | 0 | .559 | 10 | 20 | 0 | .333 | 6th (South) | N/A | — | NR | NR | N/A |
| 1989 | Jerry Kindall | Pacific-10 Conference | 45 | 18 | 1 | .703 | 23 | 7 | 0 | .766 | 1st (South) | N/A | West I Regional | 9 | 11 | N/A |
| 1990 | Jerry Kindall | Pacific-10 Conference | 26 | 34 | 0 | .433 | 11 | 19 | 0 | .366 | 5th (South) | N/A | — | NR | NR | N/A |
| 1991 | Jerry Kindall | Pacific-10 Conference | 27 | 32 | 0 | .458 | 10 | 20 | 0 | .333 | 6th (South) | N/A | — | NR | NR | N/A |
| 1992 | Jerry Kindall | Pacific-10 Conference | 34 | 23 | 0 | .596 | 18 | 12 | 0 | .600 | 1st (South) | N/A | West Regional | 13 | 12 | 17 |
| 1993 | Jerry Kindall | Pacific-10 Conference | 35 | 26 | 0 | .574 | 16 | 14 | 0 | .533 | 3rd (South) | N/A | Midwest Regional | 9 | 9 | 10 |
| 1994 | Jerry Kindall | Pacific-10 Conference | 15 | 40 | 0 | .273 | 7 | 23 | 0 | .233 | 6th (South) | N/A | — | NR | NR | NR |
| 1995 | Jerry Kindall | Pacific-10 Conference | 20 | 35 | 1 | .357 | 6 | 24 | 0 | .200 | 6th (South) | N/A | — | NR | NR | NR |
| 1996 | Jerry Kindall | Pacific-10 Conference | 24 | 32 | 0 | .429 | 7 | 23 | 0 | .233 | 6th (South) | N/A | — | NR | NR | NR |
| 1997 | Jerry Stitt | Pacific-10 Conference | 32 | 26 | 0 | .552 | 13 | 17 | 0 | .433 | 5th (South) | N/A | — | NR | NR | NR |
| 1998 | Jerry Stitt | Pacific-10 Conference | 33 | 23 | 0 | .589 | 12 | 18 | 0 | .400 | 4th (South) | N/A | — | NR | NR | NR |
| 1999 | Jerry Stitt | Pacific-10 Conference | 33 | 23 | 0 | .589 | 13 | 11 | 0 | .542 | T-4th | N/A | Waco Regional | NR | NR | NR |
| 2000 | Jerry Stitt | Pacific-10 Conference | 26 | 30 | 0 | .464 | 8 | 16 | 0 | .333 | 7th | N/A | — | NR | NR | NR |
| 2001 | Jerry Stitt | Pacific-10 Conference | 33 | 23 | 0 | .589 | 12 | 12 | 0 | .500 | 5th | N/A | — | NR | NR | NR |
| 2002 | Andy Lopez | Pacific-10 Conference | 31 | 24 | 0 | .563 | 9 | 15 | 0 | .375 | 8th | N/A | — | NR | NR | NR |
| 2003 | Andy Lopez | Pacific-10 Conference | 35 | 23 | 0 | .603 | 13 | 11 | 0 | .541 | 4th | N/A | Fullerton Regional | NR | NR | NR |
| 2004 | Andy Lopez | Pacific-10 Conference | 36 | 27 | 1 | .563 | 12 | 12 | 0 | .500 | 5th | N/A | College World Series | 12 | 6 | 7 |
| 2005 | Andy Lopez | Pacific-10 Conference | 39 | 21 | 0 | .650 | 17 | 7 | 0 | .708 | 2nd | N/A | Fullerton Regional | 12 | 12 | 12 |
| 2006 | Andy Lopez | Pacific-10 Conference | 27 | 28 | 0 | .490 | 12 | 12 | 0 | .500 | 4th | N/A | — | NR | NR | NR |
| 2007 | Andy Lopez | Pacific-10 Conference | 42 | 17 | 0 | .712 | 15 | 9 | 0 | .625 | 2nd | N/A | Wichita Regional | NR | 22 | 25 |
| 2008 | Andy Lopez | Pacific-10 Conference | 42 | 19 | 0 | .689 | 12 | 12 | 0 | .500 | 4th | N/A | Coral Gables Super Regional | 14 | 13 | 14 |
| 2009 | Andy Lopez | Pacific-10 Conference | 30 | 25 | 0 | .545 | 13 | 14 | 0 | .481 | T-5th | N/A | — | NR | NR | NR |
| 2010 | Andy Lopez | Pacific-10 Conference | 34 | 24 | 0 | .586 | 12 | 15 | 0 | .444 | T-7th | N/A | Fort Worth Regional | NR | NR | NR |
| 2011 | Andy Lopez | Pacific-10 Conference | 39 | 21 | 0 | .650 | 15 | 12 | 0 | .555 | 4th | N/A | College Station Regional | NR | 25 | 25 |
| 2012 | Andy Lopez | Pac-12 Conference | 48 | 17 | 0 | .738 | 20 | 10 | 0 | .666 | T-1st | N/A | National champions | 1 | 1 | 1 |
| 2013 | Andy Lopez | Pac-12 Conference | 34 | 21 | 0 | .618 | 15 | 15 | 0 | .500 | 6th | N/A | — | NR | NR | NR |
| 2014 | Andy Lopez | Pac-12 Conference | 22 | 33 | 0 | .400 | 9 | 21 | 0 | .300 | 10th | N/A | — | NR | NR | NR |
| 2015 | Andy Lopez | Pac-12 Conference | 31 | 24 | 0 | .536 | 12 | 18 | 0 | .400 | 8th | N/A | — | NR | NR | NR |
| 2016 | Jay Johnson | Pac-12 Conference | 49 | 24 | 0 | .671 | 16 | 14 | 0 | .533 | T-3rd | N/A | College World Series Runner-Up | 2 | 2 | 2 |
| 2017 | Jay Johnson | Pac-12 Conference | 38 | 21 | 0 | .644 | 16 | 14 | 0 | .533 | 4th | N/A | Lubbock Regional | NR | 24 | NR |
| 2018 | Jay Johnson | Pac-12 Conference | 34 | 22 | 0 | .607 | 14 | 16 | 0 | .466 | 6th | N/A | — | NR | NR | NR |
| 2019 | Jay Johnson | Pac-12 Conference | 32 | 24 | 0 | .571 | 15 | 14 | 0 | .518 | 6th | N/A | — | NR | NR | NR |
| 2020 | Jay Johnson | Pac-12 Conference | 10 | 5 | 0 | .666 | Cancelled due to COVID-19 | | | | | N/A | Cancelled due to COVID-19 | NR | NR | NR |
| 2021 | Jay Johnson | Pac-12 Conference | 45 | 18 | 0 | .714 | 21 | 9 | 0 | .700 | 1st | N/A | College World Series | 9 | 8 | 6 |
| 2022 | Chip Hale | Pac-12 Conference | 39 | 25 | 0 | .609 | 16 | 14 | 0 | .533 | 5th | 4th | Coral Gables Regional | NR | 24 | NR |
| 2023 | Chip Hale | Pac-12 Conference | 33 | 24 | 0 | .579 | 12 | 18 | 0 | .400 | 8th | 2nd | Fayetteville Regional | NR | NR | NR |
| 2024 | Chip Hale | Pac-12 Conference | 36 | 23 | 0 | .610 | 20 | 10 | 0 | .666 | 1st | 1st | Tucson Regional | 21 | N/A | NR |
| 2025 | Chip Hale | Big 12 Conference | 44 | 21 | 0 | .698 | 18 | 12 | 0 | .600 | 4th | 1st | College World Series | 7 | N/A | 7 |
| 2026 | Chip Hale | Big 12 Conference | 19 | 34 | 0 | .358 | 9 | 21 | 0 | .300 | 13th | DNQ | — | NR | N/A | NR |
| Total | | | 2,952 | 1,617 | 23 | .643 | 1904–2026 (only includes regular season games) | | | | | | | | | |
| Total | | | 135 | 89 | 0 | .603 | 1947–2026 (only includes postseason games) | | | | | | | | | |
| Total | | | 3,087 | 1,706 | 23 | .641 | 1904–2026 (all games) | | | | | | | | | |

=== Notes ===
Sources:
