= 1998 Arizona Wildcats baseball team =

American college baseball season

1998 Arizona Wildcats baseball
- Conference: Pacific-10 Conference
- Record: 33–23 (12–18 Pac-10)
- Head coach: Jerry Stitt (2nd season)
- Assistant coaches: Bill Kinneberg (2nd season); Victor Solis (2nd season)
- Home stadium: Sancet Stadium

1998 Pacific-10 Conference baseball standings
	Conf.				Overall
Team	W		L	PCT	W		L	PCT
Northern
No. 13 Washington ^{x}‍‍‍^{y}	17	–	7	.708	41	–	17	.707
Oregon State ‍‍‍	15	–	9	.625	35	–	14	.714
Washington State ‍‍‍	12	–	12	.500	25	–	24	.510
Portland State ‍‍‍	4	–	20	.167	17	–	34	.333
Southern
No. 9 Stanford ^{x}‍‍‍^{y}	22	–	8	.733	42	–	14	.750
No. 1 Southern California ‍‍‍^{y}	21	–	9	.700	49	–	17	.742
No. 2 Arizona State ‍‍‍^{y}	18	–	11	.621	41	–	23	.641
Arizona ‍‍‍	12	–	18	.400	33	–	23	.589
UCLA ‍‍‍	11	–	19	.367	23	–	33	.411
California ‍‍‍	5	–	24	.172	22	–	32	.407
x – Division champion y – Invited to the NCAA tournament As of June 30, 1998; Rankings from Collegiate Baseball

The 1998 Arizona Wildcats baseball team represented the University of Arizona during the 1998 NCAA Division I baseball season. The Wildcats played their home games at Frank Sancet Stadium. The team was coached by Jerry Stitt in his 2nd season at Arizona. The Wildcats finished 33–23 overall and placed 4th in the Pacific-10's Southern Division with a 12–18 record. This season marked the last time that the Pac-10 played in divisions, as Portland State's discontinuation of baseball following the season led to their elimination. Arizona missed the postseason for the 5th consecutive season, surpassing the previous record of 4 consecutive seasons from 1981 to 1984. This remains the longest postseason drought in program history.

== Previous season ==
The Wildcats finished the 1997 season with a record of 32-26 and 13–17 in conference play, finishing 5th in the "Six-Pac" (Pac-10 Southern). Arizona missed the postseason for the 4th straight season.

== Personnel ==
=== Roster ===
1998 Arizona Wildcats baseball roster
• Dave Abbott • Eric Aguirre • Russ Brown • James Cameron • Jeff Casper • Greg Clark • Kenny Corley • Keoni DeRenne • Brad Fendley • Josh France • Peter Fredericks • Ted Gonzalez	• Tyler Haddix • Jason Hendricks • Darrell Hussman • James Johnson • Rafell Jones • Erik Mattern • Mike Meyer • Tony Milo • Jacob Mohler	• Omar Moraga • Ryan Moskau • Colin Porter • Josh Ramsey • Rob Shabansky • Jason Shroyer • Kevin Skinner • Ryan Stoneberg • Erik Torres • Daniel Tyrell • Mark Ukleja • Devin Welch

=== Coaches ===
1998 Arizona Wildcats baseball coaching staff
- Jerry Stitt - Head coach
- Bill Kinneberg - Assistant coach
- Victor Solis - Assistant coach

== 1998 Schedule and results ==
1998 Arizona Wildcats baseball game log
Regular season
Date	Opponent	Rank	Site/Stadium	Score	Win/Loss	Overall Record	Pac-10 Record
Jan 20	Cal State Northridge		Sancet Stadium • Tucson, AZ	W 15–12	Milo (1–0)	1-0	
Jan 21	Cal State Northridge		Sancet Stadium • Tucson, AZ	W 18–1	Shabansky (1–0)	2-0	
Jan 23	San Diego		Sancet Stadium • Tucson, AZ	W 12–8	Moskau (1–0)	3-0	
Jan 24	San Diego		Sancet Stadium • Tucson, AZ	W 15–9	Milo (2–0)	4-0	
Jan 25	San Diego		Sancet Stadium • Tucson, AZ	W 10–5	Shabansky (2–0)	5-0	
Jan 30	New Mexico		Sancet Stadium • Tucson, AZ	W 9–8	Milo (3–0)	6-0	
Jan 31	New Mexico		Sancet Stadium • Tucson, AZ	W 21–8	Shabansky (3–0)	7-0	
Feb 1	New Mexico		Sancet Stadium • Tucson, AZ	W 15–6	Johnson (1–0)	8-0	
Feb 5	Baylor		Sancet Stadium • Tucson, AZ	W 8–1	Hussman (1–0)	9-0	
Feb 6	Baylor		Sancet Stadium • Tucson, AZ	W 15–2	Shabansky (4–0)	10-0	
Feb 7	Baylor		Sancet Stadium • Tucson, AZ	W 9–6	Johnson (2–0)	11-0	
Feb 10	New Mexico State		Sancet Stadium • Tucson, AZ	W 13–3	Abbott (1–0)	12-0	
Feb 11	New Mexico State		Sancet Stadium • Tucson, AZ	W 11–10	Milo (4–0)	13-0	
Feb 13	Portland State		Sancet Stadium • Tucson, AZ	W 25–6	Hussman (2–0)	14-0	
Feb 14	Portland State		Sancet Stadium • Tucson, AZ	W 22–1	Shabansky (5–0)	15-0	
Feb 14	Portland State		Sancet Stadium • Tucson, AZ	W 5–1	Moskau (2–0)	16-0	
Feb 20	at USC		Dedeaux Field • Los Angeles, CA	L 3–10	Hussman (2–1)	16-1	0-1
Feb 21	at USC		Dedeaux Field • Los Angeles, CA	L 1–4	Shabansky (5–1)	16-2	0-2
Feb 22	at USC		Dedeaux Field • Los Angeles, CA	W 3–2	Johnson (3–0)	17-2	1-2
Feb 25	Southern Utah		Sancet Stadium • Tucson, AZ	W 16–3	Abbott (2–0)	18-2	
Feb 25	Southern Utah		Sancet Stadium • Tucson, AZ	W 16–1	Milo (5–0)	19-2	
Feb 27	California		Sancet Stadium • Tucson, AZ	W 8–3	Hussman (3–1)	20-2	2-2
Feb 28	California		Sancet Stadium • Tucson, AZ	W 12–7	Moskau (3–0)	21-2	3-2
Mar 1	California		Sancet Stadium • Tucson, AZ	W 17–10	Johnson (4–0)	22-2	4-2
Mar 6	at Stanford		Sunken Diamond • Palo Alto, CA	L 4–13	Hussman (3–2)	22-3	4-3
Mar 7	at Stanford		Sunken Diamond • Palo Alto, CA	W 9–5	Milo (6–0)	23-3	5-3
Mar 8	at Stanford		Sunken Diamond • Palo Alto, CA	L 4–10	Johnson (4–1)	23-4	5-4
Mar 13	UCLA		Sancet Stadium • Tucson, AZ	L 14–16	Moskau (3–1)	23-5	5-5
Mar 14	UCLA		Sancet Stadium • Tucson, AZ	W 18–7	Milo (7–0)	24-5	6-5
Mar 15	UCLA		Sancet Stadium • Tucson, AZ	W 12–10	Moskau (4–1)	25-5	7-5
Mar 17	at UNLV		Earl Wilson Stadium • Paradise, NV	L 3–6	Hussman (3-3)	25-6	
Mar 18	at UNLV		Earl Wilson Stadium • Paradise, NV	L 6–8	Tyrrell (0–1)	25-7	
Mar 20	USC		Sancet Stadium • Tucson, AZ	L 4–6	Milo (7–1)	25-8	7-6
Mar 21	USC		Sancet Stadium • Tucson, AZ	L 6–7	Moskau (4–2)	25-9	7-7
Mar 22	USC		Sancet Stadium • Tucson, AZ	L 6–10	Abbott (2–1)	25-10	7-8
Mar 28	at Oregon State		Coleman Field • Corvallis, OR	L 2–3	Johnson (4–2)	25-11	
Mar 29	at Oregon State		Coleman Field • Corvallis, OR	L 1–9	Hussman (3–4)	25-12	
Mar 29	at Oregon State		Coleman Field • Corvallis, OR	L 3–4	Moskau (4–3)	25-13	
Apr 3	Arizona State		Sancet Stadium • Tucson, AZ	L 3–4	Johnson (4–3)	25-14	7-9
Apr 4	Arizona State		Sancet Stadium • Tucson, AZ	L 12–20	Hussman (3–5)	25-15	7-10
Apr 5	Arizona State		Sancet Stadium • Tucson, AZ	L 4–12	Milo (7–2)	25-16	7-11
Apr 7	Grand Canyon		Sancet Stadium • Tucson, AZ	W 17–0	Abbott (3–1)	26-16	
Apr 9	at UCLA		Jackie Robinson Stadium • Los Angeles, CA	W 10–4	Johnson (5–3)	27-16	8-11
Apr 10	at UCLA		Jackie Robinson Stadium • Los Angeles, CA	L 7–15	Abbott (3–2)	27-17	8-12
Apr 12	at UCLA		Jackie Robinson Stadium • Los Angeles, CA	L 7–12	Milo (7–3)	27-18	8-13
Apr 14	at Grand Canyon		Brazell Stadium • Phoenix, AZ	W 13–2	Haddix (1–0)	28-18	
Apr 17	Stanford		Sancet Stadium • Tucson, AZ	W 9–5	Johnson (6–3)	29-18	9-13
Apr 18	Stanford		Sancet Stadium • Tucson, AZ	L 3–6	Milo (7–4)	29-19	9-14
Apr 19	Stanford		Sancet Stadium • Tucson, AZ	L 1–17	Haddix (1-1)	29-20	9-15
Apr 24	at Arizona State		Packard Stadium • Tempe, AZ	W 8–7	Moskau (5–3)	30-20	10-15
Apr 25	at Arizona State		Packard Stadium • Tempe, AZ	L 13–16	Milo (7–5)	30-21	10-16
Apr 26	at Arizona State		Packard Stadium • Tempe, AZ	W 10–9	Hussman (4–5)	31-21	11-16
Apr 28	Grand Canyon		Sancet Stadium • Tucson, AZ	W 20–6	Milo (8–5)	32-21	
May 2	at California		Evans Diamond • Berkeley, CA	W 10–5	Johnson (7–3)	33-21	12-16
May 2	at California		Evans Diamond • Berkeley, CA	L 7–8	Abbott (3-3)	33-22	12-17
May 3	at California		Evans Diamond • Berkeley, CA	L 4–13	Milo (8–6)	33-23	12-18

== 1998 MLB draft ==
Player	Position	Round	Overall	MLB team
Darrell Hussman	RHP	4	110	Cincinnati Reds
Ryan Moskau	RHP	6	186	Los Angeles Dodgers
Greg Clark	C	8	228	St. Louis Cardinals
James Johnson	LHP	10	296	Milwaukee Brewers
Jason Hendricks	OF	13	384	Montreal Expos
Erik Mattern	INF	16	488	San Francisco Giants
Colin Porter	OF	17	512	Houston Astros
Kenny Corley	INF	33	991	Anaheim Angels
Rob Shabansky	LHP	39	1165	Boston Red Sox
Omar Moraga	INF	50	1438	Cleveland Indians
