= 2001 Arizona Wildcats baseball team =

American college baseball season

2001 Arizona Wildcats baseball
- Conference: Pacific-10 Conference
- Record: 33-23 (12-12 Pac-10)
- Head coach: Jerry Stitt (5th season)
- Assistant coaches: Bill Kinneberg (5th season); Victor Solis (5th season)
- Home stadium: Sancet Stadium

2001 Pacific-10 Conference baseball standings
	Conf.						Overall
Team	W		L		T	PCT	W		L		T	PCT
No. 5 Southern California ‍†‍‍	18	–	6	–	0	.750	45	–	19	–	0	.703
No. 2 Stanford ‍‍‍^{y}	17	–	7	–	0	.708	51	–	17	–	0	.750
No. 23 Arizona State ‍‍‍^{y}	14	–	10	–	0	.583	37	–	20	–	1	.647
California ‍‍‍^{y}	14	–	10	–	0	.583	34	–	25	–	0	.576
Arizona ‍‍‍	12	–	12	–	0	.500	33	–	23	–	0	.589
Oregon State ‍‍‍	11	–	13	–	0	.458	31	–	24	–	0	.564
UCLA ‍‍‍	9	–	15	–	0	.375	30	–	27	–	0	.526
Washington ‍‍‍	7	–	17	–	0	.292	29	–	23	–	0	.558
Washington State ‍‍‍	6	–	18	–	0	.250	15	–	39	–	0	.278
† – Conference champion y – Invited to the NCAA tournament As of June 30, 2001; Rankings from Collegiate Baseball

The 2001 Arizona Wildcats baseball team represented the University of Arizona during the 2001 NCAA Division I baseball season. The Wildcats played their home games at Frank Sancet Stadium. The team was coached by Jerry Stitt in his 5th season at Arizona. Following the season Coach Stitt resigned from his post after 23 seasons on the coaching staff, including the previous 5 as head coach. The Wildcats finished with an overall record of 33-23 and placed 5th in the Pacific-10 Conference with 12-12 record. They would miss the postseason for the 4th time in 5 years and 2nd straight season.

== Previous season ==
The Wildcats finished the 2000 season with an overall record of 26-30, their first losing season since 1996. They finished 5th in conference play with a record of 12-12. Arizona missed the postseason for a 2nd straight year and 4th time in Jerry Stitt's 5 seasons as head coach.

== Personnel ==
=== Roster ===
2001 Arizona Wildcats baseball roster
Pitchers • 2 - Joe Little - Freshman • 3 - Rob Elias - Senior • 12 - Sean Rierson - Freshman • 13 - Peter Fredericks - Freshman • 15 - Brian Pemble - Junior • 16 - Jason Martinez - Sophomore • 20 - Kevin Rupprecht - Freshman • 22 - Marc Kaiser - Freshman • 25 - David Brockman - Junior • 28 - Chris Goodman - Freshman • 31 - Nathan Staggs - Sophomore • 36 - Tony Sulser - Freshman • 38 - Britt Echols - Sophomore • 40 - Daryl DeSalvo - Junior • 47 - Kevin Sears - Junior	Catchers • 5 - Jeff Casper - Senior • 19 - Chris Cunningham - Junior • 26 - Ken Riley - Sophomore Infielders • 1 - Moises Duran - Freshman • 4 - Greg Powers - Sophomore • 10 - Brad Hassey - Junior • 11 - Erik Torres - Senior • 18 - Shelley Duncan - Junior • 24 - Matt Abram - Junior • 44 - Ernie Durazo - Junior	Outfielders • 14 - Kenny Huff - Junior • 27 - Brian Anderson - Freshman • 34 - Jason Shroyer - Senior • 37 - Kyle Tasco - Junior • 43 - Clayton Bried - Junior Utility • 23 - Justyn St. Claire - Junior

=== Coaches ===
2001 Arizona Wildcats baseball coaching staff
- Jerry Stitt - Head coach
- Bill Kinneberg - Assistant coach
- Victor Solis - Assistant coach

=== Opening day ===
Opening Day Starters
Name	Position
Brad Hassey	Shortstop
Matt Abram	Second baseman
Ernie Durazo	First baseman
Shelley Duncan	Right fielder
Kenny Huff	Left fielder
Erik Torres	Third baseman
Marc Kaiser	Designated hitter
Ken Riley	Catcher
Jason Shroyer	Center fielder
Sean Rierson	Starting pitcher

== Schedule and results ==
2001 Arizona Wildcats baseball game log
Regular season
Date	Opponent	Rank	Site/stadium	Score	Win/Loss	Overall Record	Pac-10 Record
Jan 18	at Hawaii-Hilo		Wong Stadium • Hilo, HI	W 3-2	Goodman (1-0)	1-0	
Jan 19	at Hawaii-Hilo		Wong Stadium • Hilo, HI	W 3-2	Kaiser (1-0)	2-0	
Jan 19	at Hawaii-Hilo		Wong Stadium • Hilo, HI	W 12-1	Little (1-0)	3-0	
Jan 20	at Hawaii-Hilo		Wong Stadium • Hilo, HI	L 1-4	Pemble (0-1)	3-1	
Jan 25	BYU		Sancet Stadium • Tucson, AZ	L 4-8	Rierson (0-1)	3-2	
Jan 26	BYU		Sancet Stadium • Tucson, AZ	W 15-7	Sulser (1-0)	4-2	
Jan 27	BYU		Sancet Stadium • Tucson, AZ	Cancelled	-	-	-
Jan 29	Saint Mary's		Sancet Stadium • Tucson, AZ	W 8-4	Pemble (1-1)	5-2	
Jan 30	Saint Mary's		Sancet Stadium • Tucson, AZ	L 8-12	Goodman (1-1)	5-3	
Jan 31	Saint Mary's		Sancet Stadium • Tucson, AZ	L 4-8	Rierson (0-2)	5-4	
Feb 2	#22 Long Beach State		Sancet Stadium • Tucson, AZ	L 4-6	Kaiser (1-1)	5-5	
Feb 3	#22 Long Beach State		Sancet Stadium • Tucson, AZ	L 9-21	Pemble (1-2)	5-6	
Feb 4	#22 Long Beach State		Sancet Stadium • Tucson, AZ	L 11-18	Brockman (0-1)	5-7	
Feb 8	New Mexico		Sancet Stadium • Tucson, AZ	W 9-3	Kaiser (2-1)	6-7	
Feb 9	New Mexico		Sancet Stadium • Tucson, AZ	W 8-0	Rierson (1-2)	7-7	
Feb 10	New Mexico		Sancet Stadium • Tucson, AZ	W 12-3	Goodman (2-1)	8-7	
Feb 16	Texas A&M		Sancet Stadium • Tucson, AZ	W 9-6	Kaiser (3-1)	9-7	
Feb 17	Texas A&M		Sancet Stadium • Tucson, AZ	W 12-5	Pemble (2-2)	10-7	
Feb 18	Texas A&M		Sancet Stadium • Tucson, AZ	W 16-5	Little (2-0)	11-7	
Feb 23	Utah		Sancet Stadium • Tucson, AZ	W 8-7	Kaiser (4-1)	12-7	
Feb 24	Utah		Sancet Stadium • Tucson, AZ	L 4-6	Elias (0-1)	12-8	
Feb 25	Utah		Sancet Stadium • Tucson, AZ	W 5-4	Sulser (2-0)	13-8	
Mar 2	vs #20 Southern Miss		Swayze Field • Oxford, MS	L 4-14	Kaiser (4-2)	13-9	
Mar 3	at Ole Miss		Swayze Field • Oxford, MS	L 4-5	Elias (0-2)	13-10	
Mar 4	vs Saint Francis (NY)		Swayze Field • Oxford, MS	W 3-1	Pemble (3-2)	14-10	
Mar 9	at #22 UCLA		Jackie Robinson Stadium • Los Angeles, CA	L 2-3	Sulser (2-1)	14-11	0-1
Mar 10	at #22 UCLA		Jackie Robinson Stadium • Los Angeles, CA	W 6-4	Rierson (2-2)	15-11	1-1
Mar 11	at #22 UCLA		Jackie Robinson Stadium • Los Angeles, CA	W 9-6	Little (3-0)	16-11	2-1
Mar 14	Houston		Sancet Stadium • Tucson, AZ	L 3-9	Pemble (3-3)	16-12	
Mar 16	Southern Utah		Sancet Stadium • Tucson, AZ	W 13-5	Kaiser (5-2)	17-12	
Mar 17	Southern Utah		Sancet Stadium • Tucson, AZ	W 7-2	Rierson (3-2)	18-12	
Mar 18	Southern Utah		Sancet Stadium • Tucson, AZ	W 13-7	DeSalvo (1-0)	19-12	
Mar 23	#12 USC		Sancet Stadium • Tucson, AZ	L 0-8	Kaiser (5-3)	19-13	2-2
Mar 24	#12 USC		Sancet Stadium • Tucson, AZ	L 4-6	Rierson (3-3)	19-14	2-3
Mar 25	#12 USC		Sancet Stadium • Tucson, AZ	L 7-8	Elias (0-3)	19-15	2-4
Mar 30	Oregon State		Sancet Stadium • Tucson, AZ	W 5-2	Kaiser (6-3)	20-15	3-4
Mar 31	Oregon State		Sancet Stadium • Tucson, AZ	L 0-8	Rierson (3-4)	20-16	3-5
Apr 1	Oregon State		Sancet Stadium • Tucson, AZ	W 13-6	Pemble (4-3)	21-16	4-5
Apr 6	at Washington State		Bailey-Brayton Field • Pullman, WA	W 14-11	DeSalvo (2-0)	22-16	5-5
Apr 7	at Washington State		Bailey-Brayton Field • Pullman, WA	W 11-7	Rierson (4-4)	23-16	6-5
Apr 8	at Washington State		Bailey-Brayton Field • Pullman, WA	L 14-17	Brockman (0-2)	23-17	6-6
Apr 12	Texas A&M-Corpus Christi		Sancet Stadium • Tucson, AZ	W 14-9	Kaiser (7-4)	24-17	
Apr 13	Texas A&M-Corpus Christi		Sancet Stadium • Tucson, AZ	W 19-7	Brockman (1-2)	25-17	
Apr 14	Texas A&M-Corpus Christi		Sancet Stadium • Tucson, AZ	W 13-0	Goodman (3-1)	26-17	
Apr 17	at Grand Canyon		Brazell Stadium • Phoenix, AZ	W 4-2	Sulser (3-1)	27-17	
Apr 20	California		Sancet Stadium • Tucson, AZ	L 9-11	Kaiser (7-4)	27-18	6-7
Apr 21	California		Sancet Stadium • Tucson, AZ	L 13-19	Martinez (0-1)	27-19	6-8
Apr 22	California		Sancet Stadium • Tucson, AZ	W 12-11	Anderson (1-0)	28-19	7-8
Apr 27	at #19 Arizona State		Packard Stadium • Tempe, AZ	L 4-7	Kaiser (7-5)	28-20	7-9
Apr 28	at #19 Arizona State		Packard Stadium • Tempe, AZ	W 3-1	Rierson (5-4)	29-20	8-9
Apr 29	at #19 Arizona State		Packard Stadium • Tempe, AZ	L 5-6	Anderson (1-1)	29-21	8-10
May 11	at Stanford		Sunken Diamond • Palo Alto, CA	L 5-6	Kaiser (7-6)	29-22	8-11
May 12	at Stanford		Sunken Diamond • Palo Alto, CA	W 5-4	Rierson (6-4)	30-22	9-11
May 13	at Stanford		Sunken Diamond • Palo Alto, CA	L 2-8	Goodman (3-1)	30-23	9-12
May 18	Washington		Sancet Stadium • Tucson, AZ	W 8-3	Kaiser (8-6)	31-23	10-12
May 19	Washington		Sancet Stadium • Tucson, AZ	W 5-2	Rierson (7-4)	32-23	11-12
May 20	Washington		Sancet Stadium • Tucson, AZ	W 18-6	Little (4-0)	33-23	12-12

== 2001 MLB draft ==
Player	Position	Round	Overall	MLB team
Shelley Duncan	OF	2	62	New York Yankees
Ernie Durazo	1B	12	361	Toronto Blue Jays
Kenny Huff	OF	36	1067	Minnesota Twins
Matt Abram	2B	38	1127	Minnesota Twins
