= 1996 Arizona Wildcats baseball team =

American college baseball season

1996 Arizona Wildcats baseball
- Conference: Pacific-10 Conference
- Record: 24–32 (7–23 Pac-10)
- Head coach: Jerry Kindall (24th season)
- Assistant coach: Jerry Stitt (18th season)
- Home stadium: Sancet Stadium

1996 Pacific-10 Conference baseball standings
	Conf.				Overall
Team	W		L	PCT	W		L	PCT
Northern
Washington ^{x}‍‍‍	16	–	8	.667	30	–	28	.517
Oregon State ‍‍‍	14	–	10	.583	32	–	16	.667
Washington State ‍‍‍	12	–	12	.500	26	–	35	.426
Portland State ‍‍‍	6	–	18	.250	14	–	37	.275
Southern
No. 9 Southern California ^{x}‍‍‍^{y}	24	–	6	.800	44	–	16	.733
No. 11 Stanford ‍‍‍^{y}	19	–	11	.633	41	–	19	.683
No. 15 UCLA ‍‍‍^{y}	16	–	14	.533	36	–	28	.563
Arizona State ‍‍‍	14	–	16	.467	35	–	21	.625
California ‍‍‍	10	–	20	.333	27	–	29	.482
Arizona ‍‍‍	7	–	23	.233	24	–	32	.429
x – Division champion y – Invited to the NCAA tournament As of June 30, 1996; Rankings from Collegiate Baseball

The 1996 Arizona Wildcats baseball team represented the University of Arizona during the 1996 NCAA Division I baseball season. The Wildcats played their home games at Frank Sancet Stadium. The team was coached by hall of fame coach Jerry Kindall in his 24th and final season at Arizona. At the season's conclusion Kindall retired and was subsequently replaced by longtime assistant Jerry Stitt. The Wildcats finished 24-32 overall and placed 6th in the Pacific-10's Southern Division with a 7–23 record. This marked the program's 3rd straight season finishing with a losing record, the only such stretch in team history. Arizona additionally missed the postseason for the 3rd consecutive season, becoming the longest postseason drought since 1981–1984.

== Previous season ==
The Wildcats finished the 1995 season with a record of 20-35-1 and 6–24 in conference play, finishing 6th in the "Six-Pac" (Pac-10 Southern). Arizona missed the postseason for the 2nd straight season.

== Personnel ==
=== Roster ===
1996 Arizona Wildcats baseball roster
• Shawn Barrington • Brian Becker • Russ Brown • Greg Clark • Kenny Corley • Clayton Crossan • Jason Ford • Jason Frierott • Jeffrey Gjerde • Tyler Haddix • Chet Henderson	• Matt Hendren • Jason Hendricks • Darrell Hussman • James Johnson • Tim King • Tom King • Erik Mattern • Jeff McCannon • Levi McClendon	• Jason Mohler • Omar Moraga • Colin Porter • John Powers • Diego Rico • Kevin Sabbe • Rob Shabansky • Kevin Skinner • A.C. Smith • Jason Thrower • Ben White

=== Coaches ===
1996 Arizona Wildcats baseball coaching staff
- Jerry Kindall - Head coach
- Jerry Stitt - Assistant coach

== 1996 Schedule and results ==
1996 Arizona Wildcats baseball game log
Regular season
Date	Opponent	Site/Stadium	Score	Overall Record	Pac-10 Record
Jan 26	New Mexico	Sancet Stadium • Tucson, AZ	W 7-5	1-0	
Jan 27	New Mexico	Sancet Stadium • Tucson, AZ	L 7-10	1-1	
Jan 28	New Mexico	Sancet Stadium • Tucson, AZ	W 6-4	2-1	
Jan 30	Cal State Dominguez Hills	Sancet Stadium • Tucson, AZ	W 13-9	3-1	
Jan 31	Cal State Dominguez Hills	Sancet Stadium • Tucson, AZ	W 10-6	4-1	
Feb 2	Washington State	Sancet Stadium • Tucson, AZ	W 11-10	5-1	
Feb 3	Washington State	Sancet Stadium • Tucson, AZ	W 4-3	6-1	
Feb 4	Washington State	Sancet Stadium • Tucson, AZ	W 12-6	7-1	
Feb 8	Texas A&M	Sancet Stadium • Tucson, AZ	W 8-7	8-1	
Feb 9	Texas A&M	Sancet Stadium • Tucson, AZ	W 6-1	9-1	
Feb 10	Texas A&M	Sancet Stadium • Tucson, AZ	L 8-9	9-2	
Feb 13	New Mexico State	Sancet Stadium • Tucson, AZ	W 15-1	10-2	
Feb 14	New Mexico State	Sancet Stadium • Tucson, AZ	W 15-4	11-2	
Feb 16	at Cal State Fullerton	Titan Field • Fullerton, CA	L 2-6	11-3	
Feb 17	at Cal State Fullerton	Titan Field • Fullerton, CA	L 5-9	11-4	
Feb 18	at Cal State Fullerton	Titan Field • Fullerton, CA	L 8-9	11-5	
Feb 20	Wyoming	Sancet Stadium • Tucson, AZ	L 9-12	11-6	
Feb 21	Wyoming	Sancet Stadium • Tucson, AZ	W 8-5	12-6	
Feb 23	Minnesota	Sancet Stadium • Tucson, AZ	L 11-12	12-7	
Feb 24	Minnesota	Sancet Stadium • Tucson, AZ	L 5-7	12-8	
Feb 25	Minnesota	Sancet Stadium • Tucson, AZ	W 4-2	13-8	
Feb 27	UC Santa Barbara	Sancet Stadium • Tucson, AZ	W 12-2	14-8	
Feb 28	UC Santa Barbara	Sancet Stadium • Tucson, AZ	W 6-1	15-8	
Mar 1	at USC	Dedeaux Field • Los Angeles, CA	L 5-20	15-9	0-1
Mar 2	at USC	Dedeaux Field • Los Angeles, CA	L 0-4	15-10	0-2
Mar 3	at USC	Dedeaux Field • Los Angeles, CA	W 9-8	16-10	1-2
Mar 8	UCLA	Sancet Stadium • Tucson, AZ	W 6-5	17-10	2-2
Mar 9	UCLA	Sancet Stadium • Tucson, AZ	W 11-6	18-10	3-2
Mar 10	UCLA	Sancet Stadium • Tucson, AZ	L 6-12	18-11	3-3
Mar 12	at Grand Canyon	Brazell Stadium • Phoenix, AZ	W 6-4	19-11	
Mar 15	California	Sancet Stadium • Tucson, AZ	L 3-13	19-12	3-4
Mar 16	California	Sancet Stadium • Tucson, AZ	L 4-8	19-13	3-5
Mar 17	California	Sancet Stadium • Tucson, AZ	L 2-15	19-14	3-6
Mar 22	at Arizona State	Packard Stadium • Tempe, AZ	L 7-8	19-15	3-7
Mar 23	at Arizona State	Packard Stadium • Tempe, AZ	L 11-16	19-16	3-8
Mar 24	at Arizona State	Packard Stadium • Tempe, AZ	W 15-7	20-16	4-8
Mar 29	at Stanford	Sunken Diamond • Palo Alto, CA	L 2-14	20-17	4-9
Mar 30	at Stanford	Sunken Diamond • Palo Alto, CA	L 6-7	20-18	4-10
Mar 31	at Stanford	Sunken Diamond • Palo Alto, CA	L 3-16	20-19	4-11
Apr 4	USC	Sancet Stadium • Tucson, AZ	L 2-6	20-20	4-12
Apr 5	USC	Sancet Stadium • Tucson, AZ	L 4-15	20-21	4-13
Apr 6	USC	Sancet Stadium • Tucson, AZ	L 0-2	20-22	4-14
Apr 9	Grand Canyon	Sancet Stadium • Tucson, AZ	L 7-12	20-23	
Apr 12	at UCLA	Jackie Robinson Stadium • Los Angeles, CA	L 3-4	20-24	4-15
Apr 13	at UCLA	Jackie Robinson Stadium • Los Angeles, CA	W 19-3	21-24	5-15
Apr 14	at UCLA	Jackie Robinson Stadium • Los Angeles, CA	W 5-4	22-24	6-15
Apr 19	Stanford	Sancet Stadium • Tucson, AZ	L 5-6	22-25	6-16
Apr 20	Stanford	Sancet Stadium • Tucson, AZ	L 3-9	22-26	6-17
Apr 21	Stanford	Sancet Stadium • Tucson, AZ	L 4-22	22-27	6-18
Apr 23	Grand Canyon	Sancet Stadium • Tucson, AZ	W 8-7	23-27	
Apr 26	at California	Evans Diamond • Berkeley, CA	L 8-9	23-28	6-19
Apr 27	at California	Evans Diamond • Berkeley, CA	L 7-11	23-29	6-20
Apr 28	at California	Evans Diamond • Berkeley, CA	L 5-8	23-30	6-21
May 11	Arizona State	Sancet Stadium • Tucson, AZ	W 14-13	24-30	7-21
May 12	Arizona State	Sancet Stadium • Tucson, AZ	L 16-20	24-31	7-22
May 13	Arizona State	Sancet Stadium • Tucson, AZ	L 3-16	24-32	7-23

== 1996 MLB draft ==
Player	Position	Round	Overall	MLB team
Daren Hooper	OF	3	81	Baltimore Orioles
John Powers	INF	21	620	San Diego Padres
Jason Ford	LHP	28	836	Colorado Rockies
