= 2000 Arizona Wildcats baseball team =

American college baseball season

2000 Arizona Wildcats baseball
- Conference: Pacific-10 Conference
- Record: 26-30 (8-16 Pac-10)
- Head coach: Jerry Stitt (4th season)
- Assistant coaches: Bill Kinneberg (4th season); Victor Solis (4th season)
- Home stadium: Sancet Stadium

2000 Pacific-10 Conference baseball standings
	Conf.				Overall
Team	W		L	PCT	W		L	PCT
No. 2 Stanford ‍†‍‍^{y}	17	–	7	.708	50	–	16	.758
No. 12 Arizona State ‍†‍‍^{y}	17	–	7	.708	44	–	15	.746
No. 16 UCLA ‍†‍‍^{y}	17	–	7	.708	38	–	26	.594
No. 5 Southern California ‍‍‍^{y}	16	–	8	.667	44	–	20	.688
California ‍‍‍	11	–	13	.458	25	–	28	.472
Oregon State ‍‍‍	9	–	15	.375	28	–	27	.509
Arizona ‍‍‍	8	–	16	.333	26	–	30	.464
Washington ‍‍‍	7	–	17	.292	26	–	30	.464
Washington State ‍‍‍	6	–	18	.250	20	–	36	.357
† – Conference champion y – Invited to the NCAA tournament As of June 19, 2000; Rankings from Collegiate Baseball

The 2000 Arizona Wildcats baseball team represented the University of Arizona during the 2000 NCAA Division I baseball season. The Wildcats played their home games at Frank Sancet Stadium. The team was coached by Jerry Stitt in his 4th season at Arizona. The Wildcats would finish 7th in the Pacific-10 Conference with a record of 8-16, 26-30 overall. This was the Wildcats 1st losing season since Jerry Kindall's final season in 1996.

== Previous season ==
The Wildcats finished the 1999 season with a record of 33-23 (13-11 Pac-10), good enough for a 3rd place finish in the conference. Arizona was selected to the postseason for the 1st time since 1993 and was placed in the Waco Regional as the 3-seed. The Wildcats would fail to win a game, losing two matches in a row to 2-seed Minnesota and 4-seed Eastern Illinois to be eliminated.

== Personnel ==
=== Roster ===
2000 Arizona Wildcats baseball roster
Pitchers • 4 - Mike Meyer - Senior • 15 - Brian Pemble - Sophomore • 16 - Rob Elias - Junior • 19 - Rob Shabansky - Senior • 21 - Mike Crawford - Senior • 23 - Tony Milo - Senior • 27 - David Capek - Senior • 28 - Kevin Huff - Senior • 29 - Scott Burns - Freshman • 30 - Robert Shulz - Senior • 33 - Ben Diggins - Junior • 39 - Nathan Duarte - Junior	Catchers • 5 - Jeff Casper - Junior • 26 - Ken Riley - Freshman • 40 - Chris Cunningham - Sophomore Infielders • 10 - Brad Hassey - Sophomore • 17 - Erik Torres - Junior • 21 - Keoni DeRenne - Junior • 24 - Matt Abram - Sophomore • 25 - Trevor Mote - Sophomore • 41 - Kelsey Osburn - Sophomore • 44 - Ernie Durazo - Sophomore	Outfielders • 1 - Rafell Jones - Senior • 2 - Troy Gingrich - Senior • 12 - Ryan O'Donnell - Junior • 18 - Shelley Duncan - Sophomore • 22 - Kenny Huff - Sophomore • 34 - Jason Shroyer - Junior • 43 - John Denny - Junior

=== Coaches ===
2000 Arizona Wildcats baseball coaching staff
- Jerry Stitt - Head coach
- Bill Kinneberg - Assistant coach
- Victor Solis - Assistant coach

=== Opening day ===
Opening Day Starters
Name	Position
Troy Gingrich	Center fielder
Ryan O'Donnell	Left fielder
Keoni DeRenne	Shortstop
Shelley Duncan	Right fielder
Erik Torres	Third baseman
Matt Abram	Designated hitter
Ernie Durazo	First baseman
Chris Cunningham	Catcher
Brad Hassey	Second baseman
Ben Diggins	Starting pitcher

== Schedule and results ==
2000 Arizona Wildcats baseball game log
Regular season
Date	Opponent	Rank	Site/stadium	Score	Win/Loss	Overall Record	Pac-10 Record
Jan 21	Saint Mary's	#19	Sancet Stadium • Tucson, AZ	W 11-2	Diggins (1-0)	1-0	
Jan 22	Saint Mary's	#19	Sancet Stadium • Tucson, AZ	L 3-4	Crawford (0-1)	1-1	
Jan 23	Saint Mary's	#19	Sancet Stadium • Tucson, AZ	W 5-2	Pemble (1-0)	2-1	
Jan 28	San Francisco	#19	Sancet Stadium • Tucson, AZ	W 4-3	Milo (1-0)	3-1	
Jan 29	San Francisco	#19	Sancet Stadium • Tucson, AZ	W 21-7	Crawford (1-1)	4-1	
Jan 30	San Francisco	#19	Sancet Stadium • Tucson, AZ	L 10-16	Meyer (0-1)	4-2	
Jan 31	BYU	#19	Sancet Stadium • Tucson, AZ	L 9-15	Milo (1-1)	4-3	
Feb 1	BYU	#19	Sancet Stadium • Tucson, AZ	L 1-8	Meyer (0-2)	4-4	
Feb 3	New Mexico	#19	Sancet Stadium • Tucson, AZ	W 7-3	Diggins (2-0)	5-4	
Feb 4	New Mexico	#19	Sancet Stadium • Tucson, AZ	W 14-7	Crawford (2-1)	6-4	
Feb 5	New Mexico	#19	Sancet Stadium • Tucson, AZ	W 6-4	Pemble (2-0)	7-4	
Feb 11	Nevada	#19	Sancet Stadium • Tucson, AZ	L 7-10	Milo (1-2)	7-5	
Feb 12	Nevada	#19	Sancet Stadium • Tucson, AZ	L 12-22	Crawford (2-2)	7-6	
Feb 13	Nevada	#19	Sancet Stadium • Tucson, AZ	W 9-3	Pemble (3-0)	8-6	
Feb 16	at Texas-A&M-Corpus Christi		Cabaniss Field • Corpus Christi, TX	W 23-8	Crawford (3-2)	9-6	
Feb 18	at Texas A&M		Olsen Field • College Station, TX	W 4-1	Diggins (3-0)	10-6	
Feb 19	at Texas A&M		Olsen Field • College Station, TX	L 3-8	Pemble (3-1)	10-7	
Feb 20	at Texas A&M		Olsen Field • College Station, TX	L 3-7	Crawford (3-3)	10-8	
Feb 25	#12 Tulane		Sancet Stadium • Tucson, AZ	W 4-3	Diggins (4-0)	11-8	
Feb 26	#12 Tulane		Sancet Stadium • Tucson, AZ	W 19-7	Crawford (4-3)	12-8	
Feb 27	#12 Tulane		Sancet Stadium • Tucson, AZ	W 8-5	Shabansky (1-0)	13-8	
Mar 3	at #18 Arizona State		Packard Stadium • Tempe, AZ	L 7-9	Milo (1-3)	13-9	
Mar 4	at #18 Arizona State		Packard Stadium • Tempe, AZ	L 3-32	Pemble (3-2)	13-10	
Mar 5	at #18 Arizona State		Packard Stadium • Tempe, AZ	L 8-14	Shabansky (1-1)	13-11	
Mar 10	UC Santa Barbara		Sancet Stadium • Tucson, AZ	W 12-8	Milo (2-3)	14-11	
Mar 11	UC Santa Barbara		Sancet Stadium • Tucson, AZ	L 12-15	Schulz (0-1)	14-12	
Mar 12	UC Santa Barbara		Sancet Stadium • Tucson, AZ	W 10-4	Diggins (5-0)	15-12	
Mar 14	#9 Houston		Sancet Stadium • Tucson, AZ	L 4-10	Crawford (4-4)	15-13	
Mar 17	California		Sancet Stadium • Tucson, AZ	W 4-1	Diggins (6-0)	16-13	1-0
Mar 18	California		Sancet Stadium • Tucson, AZ	L 6-26	Pemble (3-3)	16-14	1-1
Mar 19	California		Sancet Stadium • Tucson, AZ	L 14-24	Milo (2-4)	16-15	1-2
Mar 21	Grand Canyon		Sancet Stadium • Tucson, AZ	L 7-8	Milo (2-5)	16-16	
Mar 24	at #4 Stanford		Sunken Diamond • Palo Alto, CA	W 8-5	Diggins (7-0)	17-16	2-2
Mar 25	at #4 Stanford		Sunken Diamond • Palo Alto, CA	L 4-6	Crawford (4-5)	17-17	2-3
Mar 26	at #4 Stanford		Sunken Diamond • Palo Alto, CA	L 1-7	Shabansky (1-2)	17-18	2-4
Mar 31	#10 USC		Sancet Stadium • Tucson, AZ	W 11-4	Diggins (8-0)	18-18	3-4
Apr 1	#10 USC		Sancet Stadium • Tucson, AZ	L 9-20	Shabansky (1-3)	18-19	3-5
Apr 2	#10 USC		Sancet Stadium • Tucson, AZ	L 2-6	Crawford (4-6)	18-20	3-6
Apr 7	at Washington		Husky Ballpark • Seattle, WA	L 2-6	Diggins (8-1)	18-21	3-7
Apr 8	at Washington		Husky Ballpark • Seattle, WA	W 14-8	Milo (3-5)	19-21	4-7
Apr 9	at Washington		Husky Ballpark • Seattle, WA	W 3-2	Meyer (1-2)	20-21	5-7
Apr 14	at Oregon State		Goss Stadium • Corvallis, OR	L 3-6	Diggins (8-2)	20-22	5-8
Apr 15	at Oregon State		Goss Stadium • Corvallis, OR	L 4-10	Milo (3-6)	20-23	5-9
Apr 16	at Oregon State		Goss Stadium • Corvallis, OR	W 10-5	Shabansky (2-3)	21-23	6-9
Apr 20	Washington State		Sancet Stadium • Tucson, AZ	L 4-12	Diggins (8-3)	21-24	6-10
Apr 21	Washington State		Sancet Stadium • Tucson, AZ	L 6-9	Shabansky (2-4)	21-25	6-11
Apr 22	Washington State		Sancet Stadium • Tucson, AZ	W 21-3	Milo (4-6)	22-25	7-11
Apr 28	Cal State Northridge		Sancet Stadium • Tucson, AZ	W 6-1	Diggins (9-3)	23-25	
Apr 29	Cal State Northridge		Sancet Stadium • Tucson, AZ	W 12-8	Shabansky (3-4)	24-25	
Apr 30	Cal State Northridge		Sancet Stadium • Tucson, AZ	W 9-7	Milo (5-6)	25-25	
May 13	at UCLA		Jackie Robinson Stadium • Los Angeles, CA	L 3-5	Diggins (9-4)	25-26	7-12
May 14	at UCLA		Jackie Robinson Stadium • Los Angeles, CA	L 0-10	Shabansky (3-5)	25-27	7-13
May 15	at #22 UCLA		Jackie Robinson Stadium • Los Angeles, CA	L 5-8	Meyer (1-3)	25-28	7-14
May 19	#4 Arizona State		Sancet Stadium • Tucson, AZ	W 19-11	Diggins (10-4)	26-28	8-14
May 20	#4 Arizona State		Sancet Stadium • Tucson, AZ	L 4-11	Shabansky (3-6)	26-29	8-15
May 21	#4 Arizona State		Sancet Stadium • Tucson, AZ	L 10-24	Milo (5-7)	26-30	8-16

== 2000 MLB draft ==
Player	Position	Round	Overall	MLB team
Ben Diggins	RHP	2	62	Los Angeles Dodgers
David Abbott	RHP	12	361	Toronto Blue Jays
Keoni DeRenne	SS	36	1067	Atlanta Braves
Mike Meyer	RHP	38	1127	St. Louis Cardinals
