= 1997 Arizona Wildcats baseball team =

American college baseball season

1997 Arizona Wildcats baseball
- Conference: Pacific-10 Conference
- Record: 32–26 (13–17 Pac-10)
- Head coach: Jerry Stitt (1st season)
- Assistant coaches: Bill Kinneberg (1st season); Victor Solis (2nd season)
- Home stadium: Sancet Stadium

1997 Pacific-10 Conference baseball standings
	Conf.				Overall
Team	W		L	PCT	W		L	PCT
Northern
No. 15 Washington ^{x}‍‍‍^{y}	20	–	4	.833	46	–	20	.697
Oregon State ‍‍‍	18	–	6	.750	38	–	12	.760
Washington State ‍‍‍	7	–	17	.292	13	–	42	.236
Portland State ‍‍‍	3	–	21	.125	10	–	43	.189
Southern
No. 4 Stanford ^{x}‍‍‍^{y}	21	–	9	.700	45	–	20	.692
No. 8 UCLA ‍‍‍^{y}	19	–	11	.633	45	–	21	.682
No. 13 Southern California ‍‍‍^{y}	17	–	13	.567	42	–	20	.677
No. 14 Arizona State ‍‍‍^{y}	16	–	14	.533	39	–	22	.639
Arizona ‍‍‍	13	–	17	.433	32	–	26	.552
California ‍‍‍	4	–	26	.133	21	–	38	.356
x – Division champion y – Invited to the NCAA tournament As of June 30, 1997; Rankings from Collegiate Baseball

The 1997 Arizona Wildcats baseball team represented the University of Arizona during the 1997 NCAA Division I baseball season. The Wildcats played their home games at Frank Sancet Stadium. The team was coached by Jerry Stitt in his 1st season at Arizona. This was the program's 1st season without longtime coach Jerry Kindall's involvement since 1971. The Wildcats finished 32–26 overall and placed 5th in the Pacific-10's Southern Division with a 13–17 record. Arizona missed the postseason for the 4th consecutive season, tying the previous record of 4 consecutive seasons from 1981 to 1984.

== Previous season ==
The Wildcats finished the 1996 season with a record of 24–32 and 7–23 in conference play, finishing 6th in the "Six-Pac" (Pac-10 Southern). Arizona missed the postseason for the 3rd straight season.

== Personnel ==
=== Roster ===
1997 Arizona Wildcats baseball roster
• Dave Abbott • Greg Clark • Kenny Corley • Andre Dawson • Jeffrey Gjerde • Ted Gonzalez • Chet Henderson • Jason Hendricks • Kevin Huff • Darrell Hussman • James Johnson • Rafell Jones	• Tim King • Tom King • Erik Mattern • Mike Meyer • Tony Milo • Omar Moraga • Ryan Moskau • Colin Porter • David R. Quick	• Keith Regina • Diego Rico • Kevin Sabbe • Rob Shabansky • Jason Shroyer • Kevin Skinner • Ryan Stoneberg • Jason Thrower • Daniel Tyrell • Mark Ukleja • Devin Welch • Scott Wood

=== Coaches ===
1997 Arizona Wildcats baseball coaching staff
- Jerry Stitt – Head coach
- Bill Kinneberg – Assistant coach
- Victor Solis – Assistant coach

== 1997 Schedule and results ==
1997 Arizona Wildcats baseball game log
Regular season
Date	Opponent	Site/Stadium	Score	Overall Record	Pac-10 Record
Jan 24	at Hawaii-Hilo	Wong Stadium • Hilo, HI	W 14–1	1–0	
Jan 25	at Hawaii-Hilo	Wong Stadium • Hilo, HI	W 9–0	2–0	
Jan 25	at Hawaii-Hilo	Wong Stadium • Hilo, HI	W 4–0	3–0	
Jan 26	at Hawaii-Hilo	Wong Stadium • Hilo, HI	L 4–10	3–1	
Jan 31	New Mexico	Sancet Stadium • Tucson, AZ	L 3–7	3–2	
Feb 1	New Mexico	Sancet Stadium • Tucson, AZ	W 6–4	4–2	
Feb 2	New Mexico	Sancet Stadium • Tucson, AZ	W 8–1	5–2	
Feb 6	Cal State Fullerton	Sancet Stadium • Tucson, AZ	L 13–23	5–3	
Feb 7	Cal State Fullerton	Sancet Stadium • Tucson, AZ	L 6–8	5–4	
Feb 8	Cal State Fullerton	Sancet Stadium • Tucson, AZ	L 9–20	5–5	
Feb 11	Cal State Dominguez Hills	Sancet Stadium • Tucson, AZ	W 26–10	6–5	
Feb 12	Cal State Dominguez Hills	Sancet Stadium • Tucson, AZ	W 12–2	7–6	
Feb 14	at Texas A&M	Olsen Field • College Station, TX	W 3–2	8–5	
Feb 15	at Texas A&M	Olsen Field • College Station, TX	L 1–5	8–6	
Feb 16	at Texas A&M	Olsen Field • College Station, TX	L 4–5	8–7	
Feb 18	New Mexico State	Sancet Stadium • Tucson, AZ	W 12–4	9–7	
Feb 19	New Mexico State	Sancet Stadium • Tucson, AZ	L 4–8	9–8	
Feb 20	Southern Utah	Sancet Stadium • Tucson, AZ	W 20–6	10–8	
Feb 21	Southern Utah	Sancet Stadium • Tucson, AZ	W 3–2	11–8	
Feb 22	Oral Roberts	Sancet Stadium • Tucson, AZ	W 12–3	12–8	
Feb 23	Oral Roberts	Sancet Stadium • Tucson, AZ	L 3–5	12–9	
Feb 25	Eastern Michigan	Sancet Stadium • Tucson, AZ	W 28–0	13–9	
Feb 26	Eastern Michigan	Sancet Stadium • Tucson, AZ	W 16–3	14–9	
Feb 28	at California	Evans Diamond • Berkeley, CA	W 8–7	15–9	1–0
Mar 1	at California	Evans Diamond • Berkeley, CA	W 2–1	16–9	2–0
Mar 2	at California	Evans Diamond • Berkeley, CA	W 5–3	17–9	3–0
Mar 7	UCLA	Sancet Stadium • Tucson, AZ	W 4–2	18–9	4–0
Mar 8	UCLA	Sancet Stadium • Tucson, AZ	W 13–3	19–9	5–0
Mar 9	UCLA	Sancet Stadium • Tucson, AZ	L 1–12	19–10	5–1
Mar 11	Radford	Sancet Stadium • Tucson, AZ	W 5–4	20–10	
Mar 12	Radford	Sancet Stadium • Tucson, AZ	W 13–9	21–10	
Mar 14	at USC	Dedeaux Field • Los Angeles, CA	L 2–3	21–11	5–2
Mar 15	at USC	Dedeaux Field • Los Angeles, CA	W 6–5	22–11	6–2
Mar 16	at USC	Dedeaux Field • Los Angeles, CA	L 2–6	22–12	6–3
Mar 21	Arizona State	Sancet Stadium • Tucson, AZ	L 6–8	22–13	6–4
Mar 22	Arizona State	Sancet Stadium • Tucson, AZ	W 5–4	23–13	7–4
Mar 23	Arizona State	Sancet Stadium • Tucson, AZ	L 7–11	23–14	7–5
Mar 25	Grand Canyon	Sancet Stadium • Tucson, AZ	W 4–3	24–14	
Mar 27	Stanford	Sancet Stadium • Tucson, AZ	L 3–10	24–15	7–6
Mar 28	Stanford	Sancet Stadium • Tucson, AZ	W 11–7	25–15	8–6
Mar 29	Stanford	Sancet Stadium • Tucson, AZ	L 2–4	25–16	8–7
Apr 4	California	Sancet Stadium • Tucson, AZ	W 2–0	26–16	9–7
Apr 5	California	Sancet Stadium • Tucson, AZ	W 12–0	27–16	10–7
Apr 6	California	Sancet Stadium • Tucson, AZ	W 5–0	28–16	11–7
Apr 8	at Grand Canyon	Brazell Stadium • Phoenix, AZ	W 12–2	29–16	
Apr 11	at UCLA	Jackie Robinson Stadium • Los Angeles, CA	L 3–11	29–17	11–8
Apr 12	at UCLA	Jackie Robinson Stadium • Los Angeles, CA	L 6–13	29–18	11–9
Apr 13	at UCLA	Jackie Robinson Stadium • Los Angeles, CA	L 3–13	29–19	11–10
Apr 18	USC	Sancet Stadium • Tucson, AZ	L 6–8	29–20	11–11
Apr 19	USC	Sancet Stadium • Tucson, AZ	L 1–10	29–21	11–12
Apr 20	USC	Sancet Stadium • Tucson, AZ	L 9–13	29–22	11–13
Apr 22	Grand Canyon	Sancet Stadium • Tucson, AZ	W 15–8	30–22	
Apr 25	at Arizona State	Packard Stadium • Tempe, AZ	L 5–7	30–23	11–14
Apr 26	at Arizona State	Packard Stadium • Tempe, AZ	W 6–4	31–23	12–14
Apr 27	at Arizona State	Packard Stadium • Tempe, AZ	W 8–3	32–23	13–14
May 2	at Stanford	Sunken Diamond • Palo Alto, CA	L 2–9	32–24	13–15
May 3	at Stanford	Sunken Diamond • Palo Alto, CA	L 9–13	32–25	13–16
May 4	at Stanford	Sunken Diamond • Palo Alto, CA	L 1–12	32–26	13–17

== 1997 MLB draft ==
Player	Position	Round	Overall	MLB team
No players selected
