= Jerry Stitt =

American college baseball coach

- Stitt in 1982

Biographical details
- Born: November 29, 1946 (age 79); Phoenix, Arizona, U.S.
- Education: Arizona

Playing career
- 1968: GCL Indians
- 1968: Reno Silver Sox
- 1969: Waterbury Indians
- Position: OF

Coaching career (HC unless noted)
- 1971–1977: Salpointe Catholic HS
- 1979–1996: Arizona (Asst.)
- 1997–2001: Arizona
- 2005–2007: Missoula Osprey (Asst.)

Head coaching record
- Overall: 157–125 (.557)

Accomplishments and honors

Awards
- 2x All-WAC Team (1967, 1968); 2x All-District VII Team (1967, 1968); ABCA All-American (1968); Pima County Sports Hall of Fame

Jerry Lewis Stitt (born November 29, 1946) is an American former baseball coach, predominately in college baseball. Regarded as one of the top hitting coaches of his era, Stitt spent 18 seasons as an assistant coach to Jerry Kindall at the University of Arizona.

During his time as an assistant he mentored many future Major League Baseball players such as J. T. Snow, Chip Hale, Kenny Lofton and Terry Francona among others, and helped lead the Wildcats to two College World Series championships (1980 and 1986).

Upon Kindall's retirement in July 1996, Stitt was named the head coach for the Arizona Wildcats; he coached the team for five seasons.

== Playing career ==
Born in Phoenix, Arizona, Stitt played baseball at Central High School. He then attended the University of Arizona, where he played in the outfield under Hall of Fame coach Frank Sancet. Stitt was a 3-year letterwinner for the Wildcats.

In his 1966 sophomore season, Arizona was Western Athletic Conference (WAC) champions and advanced to the College World Series, where they would eventually lose to USC.

In 1967 and 1968 Stitt was named to the All-WAC and All-District VII teams, and in 1968 was honored as a first-team All-American by the American Baseball Coaches Association. During his 1968 senior season, he led Arizona in steals and batting average at .366 to finish with a career .326 batting average for the Wildcats.

Stitt was selected with the 711th pick in the 32nd Round of the 1968 MLB draft by the Cleveland Indians. Stitt spent the rest of 1968 playing first for the rookie-league GCL Indians in Sarasota, FL and Class-A Reno Silver Sox. In 1969, he progressed to the Double-A Waterbury Indians, playing in 66 games and batting .222 with 2 home runs.

Following the 1969 season, Stitt decided to end his playing career and return to Tucson.

== Coaching career ==
=== Salpointe Catholic High School (1971–1977) ===
In 1971, Stitt was hired as a teacher and head baseball coach at Salpointe Catholic High School in Tucson, where he would coach until 1977. Over those seven seasons, he led Salpointe to a record of 93-72, and would later be inducted into the Salpointe Sports Hall of Fame in 1994.

=== Arizona Wildcats (1979–2001) ===
==== Assistant Coach (1979–1996) ====
Following a brief stint as the athletics director at Grand Canyon High School in 1978, Stitt returned to his alma mater Arizona to become the hitting coach as an assistant to Hall of Fame coach Jerry Kindall.

Stitt experienced immediate success, helping coach the 1979 Wildcats to the College World Series while also setting several Pacific-10 Conference (Pac-10) season batting records. The next season in 1980, Arizona would win their second College World Series championship defeating Hawaii in the title game.

In all, during Stitt's time as an assistant at Arizona the Wildcats would make it to the postseason eight times, advancing to the College World Series four times (1979, 1980, 1985 and 1986) and winning two College World Series championships (1980 and 1986). Stitt's offenses batted a combined .327 over the course of his assistant coaching career and the Wildcats garnered the highest cumulative batting average in the Pac-10 Southern (commonly called the "Six-Pac") during the 1980s. 57 position players coached by Stitt were drafted by MLB teams, including most notably: George Arias, Casey Candaele, Jack Daugherty, Terry Francona, Chip Hale, Trevor Hoffman, Kenny Lofton, and J.T. Snow.

==== Head coach (1997–2001) ====
When Kindall retired after 24 seasons at the conclusion of the 1996 season, Stitt was hired as the fifth head coach in modern Wildcats baseball history. Stitt would fill out his staff by hiring Utah Utes head coach Bill Kinneberg as his associate head coach/pitching coach and Victor Solis as his bench coach.

In Stitt's first season at the helm in 1997, the Wildcats finished with a decent overall record of 32–26, but a losing record in Pac-10 play (13–17) failing to make the postseason for the fourth straight season. This would tie Arizona's longest streak of failing to reach the postseason (set earlier in Stitt's assistant coaching career from 1981–1984) since the introduction of the postseason tournament in 1947.

The Wildcats would set a new record for longest postseason drought in program history the next season in 1998 when they again failed to reach the tournament, finishing with another decent overall record of 33–23 but another losing record in conference play (12–18).

In 1999, the Wildcats would finally break through; paced by the trio of Keoni DeRenne, Dennis Anderson and Troy Gingrich, the Wildcats finished with an identical overall record of 33–23 but a winning record in Pac-10 games (13–11) and were selected to the NCAA tournament as the 3-seed in the Waco Regional. The Wildcats would lose two straight games to 2-seed Minnesota and 4-seed Eastern Illinois and were eliminated without winning a game. This, however, would mark Stitt's most successful season as head coach and would be the only season in which he would post a winning conference record or postseason appearance.

Arizona would take a step back in 2000, ending the season with a losing record of 26–30 (8–16 in Pac-10).

By 2001, there was a growing sense of restlessness and frustration amongst the fanbase and university administration. Despite having finished with reasonable overall records in three of the past four seasons, the Wildcats had not been competitive in conference play and had fallen behind the rival Arizona State Sun Devils in recruiting and performance. While the Sun Devils, under Jim Brock and Pat Murphy, had made the postseason in six of the previous 10 seasons including two College World Series appearances, the Wildcats under Kindall and Stitt had appeared in only three postseasons over the same period, had not appeared in the College World Series since 1986 and had not won a postseason game since defeating Oklahoma State 4–0 in 1993 in the Midwest Regional. Speculation began to ensue that 2001 may be Stitt's final season with the program barring a significant turnaround.

The 2001 Wildcats would finish with yet another 33–23 record (12–12 in Pac-10), narrowly missing out again on making the NCAA tournament.

On June 29, 2001 Stitt resigned as the head coach via a university press release after five seasons, 23 in total with the program. Assistant coaches Kinneberg and Solis were also released following Stitt's resignation. Rumored replacements at the time were former Wildcats players Chip Hale and Ron Hassey, along with recently-fired Florida Gators head coach Andy Lopez, who would eventually be given the job. It is unclear whether Stitt was asked to resign by athletic director Jim Livengood, but it was reported that Stitt had been given a verbal contract extension only a month earlier by Livengood only to have the offer rescinded when news reports became public regarding Lopez's firing from Florida. Nevertheless, the university released a statement thanking Stitt for his longtime service to the baseball program and praising his character and integrity.

Stitt would finish with a head coaching record of 157–125 (58–74 Pac-10) with one NCAA tournament appearance.

==== Post-resignation ====
Following his resignation, Stitt continued to be employed by the university for a time working in academics for the athletics department.

In September 2002, Stitt was honored with induction into the Pima County Sports Hall of Fame for his career playing and coaching at the University of Arizona and his time coaching at Salpointe Catholic High School.

=== Missoula Osprey (2005–2007) ===
In 2005, Stitt was hired by the Arizona Diamondbacks to serve as the hitting coach for their Pioneer League (Rookie-Advanced Class) affiliate, the Missoula Osprey.

During his time in Missoula, Stitt mentored several future MLB position players, including Pedro Ciriaco, John Hester, and Gerardo Parra. Stitt also helped coach the Osprey to the 2006 Pioneer League Championship, sweeping the Billings Mustangs and Idaho Falls Chukars to claim the club's second title.

In 2006, Stitt also briefly served as the temporary hitting coach for the Diamondbacks Triple-A-affiliate Tucson Sidewinders. Regular hitting coach Lorenzo Bundy was serving as temporary club manager while Sidewinders manager Chip Hale was called up to coach third base for the Arizona Diamondbacks following Carlos Tosca's foot injury.

== Head coaching record ==
Below is a table of Stitt's NCAA head coaching record.

Record table
Season	Team	Overall	Conference	Standing	Postseason
Arizona Wildcats (Pacific-10 Conference) (1997–2001)
1997	Arizona	32–26	13–17	5th (South)	
1998	Arizona	33–23	12–18	4th (South)	
1999	Arizona	33–23	13–11	3rd	NCAA Regional
2000	Arizona	26–30	8–16	7th	
2001	Arizona	33–23	12–12	5th	
Arizona:		157–125 (.557)	58–74 (.439)		
Total:		157–125			
National champion Postseason invitational champion Conference regular season champion Conference regular season and conference tournament champion Division regular season champion Division regular season and conference tournament champion Conference tournament champion

== Post-coaching career ==
Following his retirement from coaching, Stitt was named the assistant athletics director at Pima Community College in 2008.

Stitt remained involved with baseball in the Tucson area. In the late 2000s, he founded and directed the Baja Arizona Baseball Academy. In January 2019, Stitt hosted a single-day baseball clinic for people of all ages in memory of former Arizona coach Jerry Kindall who had died in late 2017 after suffering a stroke. The clinic featured former Wildcats players Kevin Long, Chip Hale, and Brent Strohm, all of whom were MLB coaches at the time.

Following the hiring of Chip Hale as the head coach of the Arizona Wildcats baseball team in 2022, Stitt attended a number of practices to assist with coaching batting.

== Personal life ==
Stitt continues to reside in Tucson, where he has lived most of his life.

Stitt was close friends with his colleague Jerry Kindall, whom Stitt credits with having changed his life and making him into the coach that he became.

In 1973, Stitt earned a master's degree in Education from the University of Arizona and in 1993 earned a doctoral degree in Education Administration, also from the University of Arizona. His dissertation was an argument in favor of ensuring that athletic department goals more closely aligned with the overall educational and social goals of their associated universities.
