= Pac-12 Conference Baseball Newcomer of the Year =

Pac-12 Conference Newcomer of the Year
- Awarded for: the Newcomer of the Year award is given annually to an outstanding freshman or transfer in the Pac-12 Conference
- Country: United States
- First award: 2000
- Currently held by: Brandon Cumpton, Arizona State

The Pac-12 Newcomer of the Year is a baseball award given to the Pac-12 Conference's most outstanding freshman or transfer. The first year of the award was given in 2000, took one year off in 2001 and has been given every year since 2002. Both pitchers and position players are eligible.

== Key ==
†	Co-newcomer of the Year
*	Awarded a national Freshman of the Year award: Baseball America, Collegiate Baseball or D1 Freshman Of The Year

== Winners ==
=== 2000–present ===
Season	Player	School	Reference
2000	Anthony Lunetta	Southern California	
2001	None		
2002	Wes Whisler	UCLA	
2003	Jeff Clement*	Southern California	
2004	Tim Lincecum*	Washington	
2005	Darwin Barney	Oregon State	
2006	Ike Davis	Arizona State	
2007†	Gabe Cohen	UCLA	
2007†	Grant Green	Southern California	
2008	Jason Kipnis	Arizona State	
2009	Trevor Bauer*	UCLA	
2010	Kenny Diekroeger	Stanford	
2011	Brian Ragira	Stanford	
2012	Michael Conforto*	Oregon State	
2013	Andrew Moore	Oregon State	
2014	Cal Quantrill	Stanford	
2015	KJ Harrison	Oregon State	
2016	Nick Madrigal	Oregon State	
2017	Andrew Vaughn	California	
2018	Spencer Torkelson*	Arizona State	
2019	Austin Wells	Arizona	
2020	None		
2021	Daniel Susac	Arizona	
2022	Braden Montgomery	Stanford	
2023	Malcolm Moore	Stanford	
2024	Brandon Cumpton	Arizona State	

== Winners by school ==
School (year joined)	Winners	Years
Oregon State (1964)	5	2005, 2012, 2013, 2015, 2016
Stanford (1959)	5	2010, 2011, 2014, 2022, 2023
Arizona State (1978)	4	2006, 2008, 2018, 2024
Southern California (1959)	3	2000, 2003, 2007
UCLA (1959)	3	2002, 2007, 2009
Arizona (1978)	2	2019, 2021
California (1959)	1	2017
Washington (1959)	1	2004
Oregon^{a} (1964)	0	—
Utah (2011)	0	—
Washington State (1962)	0	—

== Footnotes ==
- ^{a} Oregon discontinued its baseball program after the 1981 season, re-instating it before the 2009 season.
