= Arizona Wildcats baseball =

Baseball team of the University of Arizona

- 2026 Arizona Wildcats baseball team
- Founded: 1904; 122 years ago
- University: University of Arizona
- Head coach: Chip Hale (5th season)
- Conference: Big 12
- Location: Tucson, Arizona
- Home stadium: Hi Corbett Field (capacity: 9,500)
- Nickname: Wildcats
- Colors: Cardinal and navy

College World Series champions
- 1976, 1980, 1986, 2012

College World Series runner-up
- 1956, 1959, 1963, 2016

College World Series appearances
- 1954, 1955, 1956, 1958, 1959, 1960, 1963, 1966, 1970, 1976, 1979, 1980, 1985, 1986, 2004, 2012, 2016, 2021, 2025

NCAA regional champions
- 1976, 1979, 1980, 1985, 1986, 2004, 2008, 2012, 2016, 2021, 2025

NCAA tournament appearances
- 1950, 1951, 1952, 1953, 1954, 1955, 1956, 1957, 1958, 1959, 1960, 1961, 1962, 1963, 1966, 1970, 1974, 1975, 1976, 1978, 1979, 1980, 1985, 1986, 1987, 1989, 1992, 1993, 1999, 2003, 2004, 2005, 2007, 2008, 2010, 2011, 2012, 2016, 2017, 2021, 2022, 2023, 2024, 2025

Conference tournament champions
- Pac-12: 2024; Big 12: 2025

Conference regular season champions
- WAC:1963, 1966, 1974; Pac-10/12: 1980, 1989, 1992, 2012, 2021, 2024

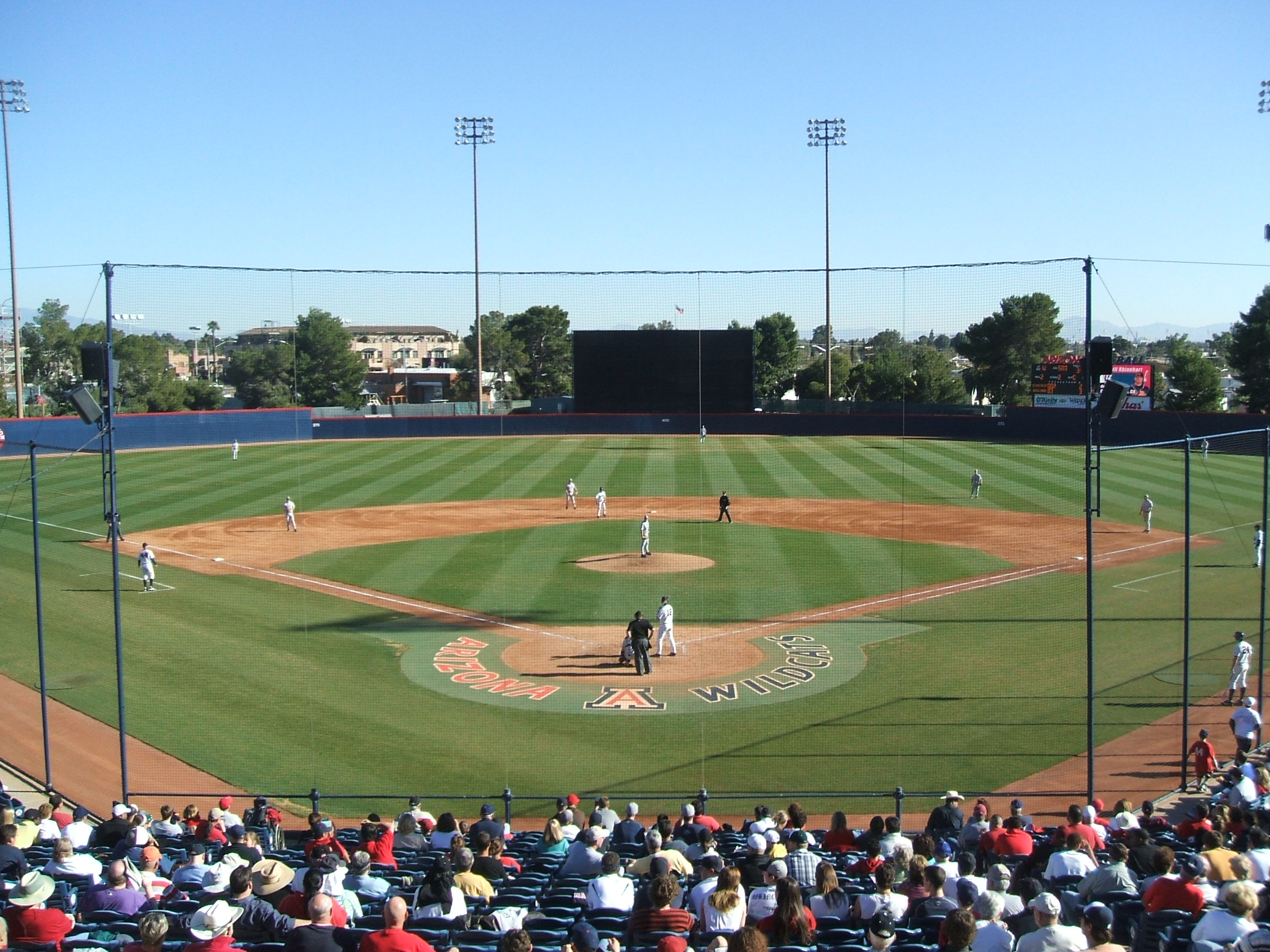
Kindall Field where the Wildcats played baseball until 2012, when they relocated to nearby Hi Corbett Field

The Arizona Wildcats baseball team is the intercollegiate men's baseball program representing the University of Arizona in Tucson, Arizona, United States. They compete in the Big 12 Conference (Big 12) of NCAA Division I.

Arizona has won four college baseball national championships (1976, 1980, 1986 and 2012), the first three under Jerry Kindall and the most recent under Andy Lopez. The team has appeared in the College World Series Championship Game or Series on four other occasions (1956, 1959, 1963, and 2016). The Wildcats have appeared in 44 NCAA baseball tournaments in their rich history. Arizona ranks ninth in all-time wins and eight in all-time win percentage, with an all-time record of 3,068–1,674–22 (.646) as of the 2025 season. Arizona fielded its first team in 1905.

== Venues ==
=== Jerry Kindall Field at Frank Sancet Stadium ===
The former home of Arizona baseball is Jerry Kindall Field at Frank Sancet Stadium. The park is located on the campus of the University of Arizona, adjacent to the McKale Center, home of the UA athletics department. Arizona played its games at the Kindall Field from prior to the 1967 season through the end of the 2011 season. Modernization of the facility was completed for the 1975 season. Originally called Wildcat Field, the park was officially dedicated Frank Sancet Field on April 19, 1986, in honor of Arizona's longtime head coach. Sancet, who coached from 1950 to 1972, posted an 831–283–8 (.744) mark at the helm of the Cats.

=== Relocation to Hi Corbett Field (2011-present) ===
In an effort to have the Wildcat baseball program compete in the best possible facilities, in August 2011, the UA signed an agreement with the city of Tucson for Arizona baseball to play its home games at city-owned Hi Corbett Field, located about three miles southeast of campus, for the 2012 season (beginning with a five-year lease with an option to renew for an additional five years). The UA spent about $350,000 to make several upgrades to the former spring training facility (used as such by the Cleveland Indians and the Colorado Rockies), where the Wildcats previously played selected games in the 1960s and '70s. Through the first three-game series of the 2012 season against North Dakota State, the attendance at the stadium was a total of 8,870, which was nearly 1/4th of the total home attendance for the Wildcats' previous season at Sancet Stadium.

In 2012, the Wildcats posted a 38–17 regular season record (20–10 in Pac-12 conference play), capturing a share of the Pac-12 baseball championship, the school's first league title since 1992. As a result, Hi Corbett Field hosted both an NCAA Regional and Super Regional tournament, and Arizona won both of those to advance to the 2012 College World Series (the program's first postseason appearance in Omaha since 2004) where the team won its fourth national championship. In the 2012 season, the team brought in almost $350,000 in ticket revenue (not including revenue for tickets sold during the NCAA Regional or Super Regional); this is compared to the 2011 season, when Arizona baseball brought in $69,000 worth of ticket revenue in its final season at Sancet Stadium. The relocation of the Wildcat baseball program to Hi Corbett Field has been noted as a major factor in the team's successful 2012 season.

In March 2017, the university signed a 25-year lease on Hi Corbett Field, taking over the day-to-day management of the baseball stadium from the City of Tucson.

== Head coaches ==
- Modern Era (1950-current). Records are through the 2025 season

Tenure	Coach	Years	Record	Pct.
1950–1972	Frank Sancet	23	831–275–8	.750
1973–1996	Jerry Kindall	24	860–579–7	.597
1997–2001	Jerry Stitt	5	157–125	.557
2002–2015	Andy Lopez	14	490–324–1	.602
2016–2021	Jay Johnson	6	208–114	.646
2022–present	Chip Hale	5	171–129	.570
Totals	6 coaches	77 seasons	2,715–1,546–16	.637

=== Current coaching staff ===
- Head coach: Chip Hale
- Associate Head Coach/Recruiting Coordinator: Trip Couch
- Assistant coach (Pitching): Sean Kenny
- Assistant coach (Hitting/Outfield): Jack Meggs
- Assistant coach(Catching/Assistant Hitting):Daniel Molinari
- Assistant coach (Director of Player Development/Recruitng): Garen Caulfield
- Assistant coach: Sean Winston
- Director of Baseball Operations: Ella Wolters

== Records and results ==
=== Year-by-year results ===
National champions	Conference Regular Season Champions	Conference Division Champions	Conference Tournament Champions

Note: W = Wins, L = Losses, T = Ties, C = Conference

Season	Coach	Conference	W	L	T	CW	CL	CT	Postseason
1950	Frank Sancet	Independent	28	6	1				College World Series
1951	Frank Sancet	Independent	28	4	0				NCAA Tournament
1952	Frank Sancet	Independent	22	14	0				NCAA Tournament
1953	Frank Sancet	Independent	21	16	0				NCAA Tournament
1954	Frank Sancet	Independent	40	9	0				College World Series
1955	Frank Sancet	Independent	43	8	0				College World Series
1956	Frank Sancet	Independent	49	8	0				College World Series
1957	Frank Sancet	Independent	34	12	0				NCAA Tournament
1958	Frank Sancet	Independent	38	14	0				College World Series
1959	Frank Sancet	Independent	39	10	2				College World Series
1960	Frank Sancet	Independent	43	9	0				College World Series
1961	Frank Sancet	Independent	41	9	0				NCAA Tournament
1962	Frank Sancet	Independent	40	8	2				NCAA Tournament
1963	Frank Sancet	WAC	39	17	0	8	4	0	College World Series
1964	Frank Sancet	WAC	31	13	1	7	5	0	
1965	Frank Sancet	WAC	37	13	0	7	5	0	
1966	Frank Sancet	WAC	40	15	0	8	4	0	College World Series
1967	Frank Sancet	WAC	35	15	0	7	6	0	
1968	Frank Sancet	WAC	34	17	0	6	6	0	
1969	Frank Sancet	WAC	37	10	0	10	8	0	
1970	Frank Sancet	WAC	44	18	0	11	7	0	College World Series
1971	Frank Sancet	WAC	30	18	2	0	10	8	
1972	Jerry Kindall	WAC	38	20	0	9	9	0	
1973	Jerry Kindall	WAC	37	16	0	15	5	0	
1974	Jerry Kindall	WAC	58	6	0	16	2	0	NCAA Tournament
1975	Jerry Kindall	WAC	43	13	1	14	4	0	NCAA Tournament
1976	Jerry Kindall	WAC	56	17	0	12	6	0	College World Series
1977	Jerry Kindall	WAC	38	25	1	11	7	0	
1978	Jerry Kindall	WAC	42	18	0	13	5	0	NCAA Tournament
1979	Jerry Kindall	Pac-10	43	25	0	17	13	0	College World Series
1980	Jerry Kindall	Pac-10	45	21	1	17	13	0	College World Series
1981	Jerry Kindall	Pac-10	30	22	0	14	16	0	
1982	Jerry Kindall	Pac-10	32	21	1	15	13	1	
1983	Jerry Kindall	Pac-10	25	31	0	14	15	0	
1984	Jerry Kindall	Pac-10	22	36	0	11	19	0	
1985	Jerry Kindall	Pac-10	47	22	0	17	13	0	College World Series
1986	Jerry Kindall	Pac-10	49	19	0	18	12	0	College World Series
1987	Jerry Kindall	Pac-10	34	26	0	13	17	0	NCAA Tournament
1988	Jerry Kindall	Pac-10	33	26	0	10	20	0	
1989	Jerry Kindall	Pac-10	45	18	1	23	7	0	NCAA Tournament
1990	Jerry Kindall	Pac-10	26	34	0	11	19	0	
1991	Jerry Kindall	Pac-10	27	32	0	10	20	0	NCAA Tournament
1992	Jerry Kindall	Pac-10	34	23	1	18	12	0	NCAA Tournament
1993	Jerry Kindall	Pac-10	35	26	0	16	14	0	
1994	Jerry Kindall	Pac-10	15	40	0	7	23	0	
1995	Jerry Kindall	Pac-10	20	35	1	6	24	0	
1996	Jerry Kindall	Pac-10	24	32	0	7	23	0	
1997	Jerry Stitt	Pac-10	32	26	0	13	17	0	
1998	Jerry Stitt	Pac-10	33	23	0	12	18	0	
1999	Jerry Stitt	Pac-10	33	23	0	13	11	0	NCAA Tournament
2000	Jerry Stitt	Pac-10	26	30	0	8	16	0	
2001	Jerry Stitt	Pac-10	33	23	0	12	12	0	
2002	Andy Lopez	Pac-10	31	24	0	9	15	0	
2003	Andy Lopez	Pac-10	35	23	0	13	11	0	NCAA Tournament
2004	Andy Lopez	Pac-10	36	27	1	12	12	0	College World Series
2005	Andy Lopez	Pac-10	39	21	0	17	7	0	NCAA Tournament
2006	Andy Lopez	Pac-10	27	28	0	12	12	0	
2007	Andy Lopez	Pac-10	42	17	0	15	9	0	NCAA Tournament
2008	Andy Lopez	Pac-10	42	19	0	12	12	0	NCAA Tournament
2009	Andy Lopez	Pac-10	30	25	0	13	14	0	
2010	Andy Lopez	Pac-10	34	24	0	12	15	0	NCAA Tournament
2011	Andy Lopez	Pac-10	39	21	0	15	12	0	NCAA Tournament
2012	Andy Lopez	Pac-12	48	17	0	20	10	0	College World Series
2013	Andy Lopez	Pac-12	34	21	0	15	15	0	
2014	Andy Lopez	Pac-12	22	33	0	9	21	0	
2015	Andy Lopez	Pac-12	31	24	0	12	18	0	
2016	Jay Johnson	Pac-12	49	24	0	16	14	0	College World Series
2017	Jay Johnson	Pac-12	38	21	0	16	14	0	NCAA Tournament
2018	Jay Johnson	Pac-12	34	22	0	14	16	0	
2019	Jay Johnson	Pac-12	32	24	0	15	14	0	
2020	Jay Johnson	Pac-12	10	5	0	0	0	0	season canceled due to the COVID-19 pandemic
2021	Jay Johnson	Pac-12	45	18	0	21	9	0	College World Series
2022	Chip Hale	Pac-12	39	25	0	16	14	0	NCAA Tournament
2023	Chip Hale	Pac-12	33	26	0	12	18	0	NCAA Tournament
2024	Chip Hale	Pac-12	36	23	0	20	10	0	NCAA Tournament
2025	Chip Hale	Big 12	42	18	0	18	12	0	NCAA Tournament
Total:			2,696	1,522	16	790	764	9	
Win Percentage:			.639			.508			

=== Polls ===
Arizona been ranked in the Baseball America Division I Final Poll 33 times.

Top-10 finishes are colored ██

Year	Record	Final Ranking
1959	39–10–2	2
1960	43–9	3
1961	41–9	10
1962	40–8	19
1963	39–17	2
1964	31–13–1	20
1965	37–13	25
1966	40–15	5
1967	35–15	12
1968	34–17	16

Year	Record	Final Ranking
1969	37–10	19
1970	44–18	7
1973	37–16	28
1974	58–6	9
1975	43–13–1	13
1976	56–17	1
1978	42–18	10
1979	43–25	2
1980	45–21	1
1985	47–22	11

Year	Record	Final Ranking
1986	49–19	1
1989	45–18	9
1992	34–23–1	13
1993	35–26	9
2004	36–27–1	12
2007	42–17	22
2008	42–19	14
2011	39–21	25
2012	48–17	1
2016	49–24	2

Year	Record	Final Ranking
2021	45–18	9
2024	36–23	21
2025	44–21	7

=== All-time record vs. Big 12 teams ===
Opponent	Won	Lost	Tie	Percentage	Streak	First Meeting
Arizona State	268	233	1	.535	Won 1	1907
Baylor	10	5	0	.667	Won 2	1998
BYU	26	12	0	.684	Lost 2	1963
Cincinnati	3	0	0	1.000	Won 1	2025
Colorado†	15	1	0	.938	Won 1	1950
Houston	8	8	0	.500	Won 1	1960
Iowa State†	0	1	0	.000	Lost 1	1970
Kansas	1	3	0	.250	Lost 3	2025
Kansas State	3	2	0	.600	Won 1	1993
Oklahoma State	10	17	0	.370	Lost 2	1954
TCU	12	6	0	.667	Won 1	1956
Texas Tech	12	9	0	.571	Lost 1	1972
Utah	70	25	0	.737	Lost 2	1952
UCF	0	3	0	.000	Lost 3	2026
West Virginia	4	4	0	.500	Lost 1	2023
Totals	441	329	1	.931		

^{†}Colorado & Iowa State no longer have baseball programs

=== Arizona State ===
Arizona's main rival is Arizona State. The Wildcats lead the Sun Devils in all time baseball series 267–237–1 as of April 14th, 2026 and both teams have had several players drafted into MLB. In recent years, Arizona has had an edge over Arizona State in college baseball success. In 2010 ASU won the Pac-10 and also advanced to the College World Series, capping the end of a dominating run of 4 straight Pac-10 conference championships and 3 CWS appearances in 4 years (missed CWS in 2008). Later, the NCAA would vacate the 2007 Pac-10 Championship and 2007 CWS appearance from ASU's record.

Since then Arizona has won the CWS (2012), was the CWS runner-up (2016) and won two Pac-12 Championships (2021 & 2024). In contrast to Arizona's recent success, ASU has not won the Pac-10/12 Conference since 2010, has not been the CWS runner up since 1988 and has not won an NCAA Championship since 1981. Arizona has won 2 NCAA championships since 1981. While ASU still has a more robust historical record (5x NCAA Champs, 1965, 1967, 1969, 1977, 1981 and 21x CWS appearances), Arizona has narrowed that gap in the last 20 years.

Opponent	Won	Lost	Tie	Percentage	Streak	First Meeting
Arizona State	268	237	1	.531	Won 1	1907
Grand Canyon	72	34	0	.679	Lost 1	1967
Northern Arizona	48	6	0	.889	Won 40	1948
Totals	388	277	1	.583		

=== Arizona in the NCAA Tournament ===
Arizona has appeared in the NCAA tournament a total 44 times (as of 2026), 6th most in NCAA history. The Wildcats have hosted regionals 13 times(as of 2026).

- The NCAA Division I baseball tournament started in 1947.
- The format of the tournament has changed through the years.

National champions	Runner-up	College World Series	Super Regionals

Year	W	L	Percent
1954	4	2	.667
1955	4	3	.571
1956	6	2	.750
1957	0	2	.000
1958	2	3	.400
1959	5	2	.714
1960	4	2	.667
1961	0	2	.000
1962	0	2	.000
1963	6	2	.750
1966	5	2	.714
1970	2	3	.400
1974	0	2	.000
1975	0	2	.000
1976	8	1	.889
1978	2	2	.500
1979	4	2	.667
1980	8	1	.889
1985	3	2	.600
1986	8	1	.889
1987	0	2	.000
1989	3	2	.600
1992	0	2	.000
1993	3	2	.600
1999	0	2	.000
2003	0	2	.000
2004	6	3	.667
2005	2	2	.500
2007	2	2	.500
2008	4	2	.667
2010	1	2	.333
2011	3	2	.600
2012	10	0	1.000
2016	11	3	.786
2017	1	2	.333
2021	5	3	.625
2022	2	2	.500
2023	0	2	.000
2024	0	2	.000
2025	5	3	.625
Total:	127	81	.611

==== College World Series ====
Arizona has made eighteen appearances in the College World Series, compiling a 43–32 record, advancing to the title game on eight occasions and winning the College World Series four times, which is tied for 5th most all-time.

Year	Place
1954	6th
1954	4th
1956	2nd
1958	8th
1959	2nd
1960	3rd
1963	2nd
1966	5th
1970	8th
1976	1st
1979	5th
1980	1st
1985	8th
1986	1st
2004	5th
2012	1st
2016	2nd
2021	8th
2025	7th
18	43–34 (.558)

== Championships ==
=== National Championship appearances ===
Arizona has appeared in the College World Series National Championship game eight times in 1956, 1959, 1963, 1976, 1980, 1986, 2012 and 2016.

Season	Coach	Opponent	Result	Overall record
1956	Frank Sancet	Minnesota	Minnesota 12, Arizona 1	49–8
1959	Frank Sancet	Oklahoma State	Oklahoma State 5, Arizona 3	39–10–2
1963	Frank Sancet	USC	USC 5, Arizona 2	39–17
1976	Jerry Kindall	Eastern Michigan	Arizona 7, Eastern Michigan 1	56–17
1980	Jerry Kindall	Hawaii	Arizona 5, Hawaii 3	45–21–1
1986	Jerry Kindall	Florida State	Arizona 10, Florida State 2	49–19
2012	Andy Lopez	South Carolina	Arizona 4, South Carolina 1	48–17
2016	Jay Johnson	Coastal Carolina	Coastal Carolina 4, Arizona 3	49–23
Total National Championship Game Appearances				8

=== Divisional Championships ===
Season	Conference	Division	Coach	Conference
1963	WAC	South	Frank Sancet	8–4
1966	WAC	South	Frank Sancet	8–4
1968	WAC	South	Frank Sancet	6–6
1970	WAC	South	Frank Sancet	11–7
1974	WAC	South	Frank Sancet	16–2
1980	Pac−10	South	Jerry Kindall	17–3
1989	Pac−10	South	Jerry Kindall	23–7
Total division titles			7	

=== Conference Regular Season Championships ===
Season	Conference	Coach	Overall	Conference
1966	WAC	Frank Sancet	40–15	8–4
1974	WAC	Frank Sancet	58–6	16–2
1980	Pac−10	Jerry Kindall	45–21–1	17–12
1989	Pac−10	Jerry Kindall	45–18–1	23–7
1992	Pac−10	Jerry Kindall	34–23	18–12
2012	Pac−12	Andy Lopez	48–17	20–10
2021	Pac−12	Jay Johnson	45–18	21–9
2024	Pac−12	Chip Hale	36–23	20–10
Total Conference titles			8	

=== Conference Tournament championship ===
Season	Conference	Coach	Winning Team	Losing Team
2023	Pac−12	Chip Hale	Oregon 6	Arizona 4
2024	Pac−12	Chip Hale	Arizona 4	USC 3
2025	Big 12	Chip Hale	Arizona 4	TCU 3
Championship Results			2−1	

== Awards ==
=== Golden Spikes Award ===
Golden Spikes Award
Year	Player	Position
1980	Terry Francona	OF

=== Conference awards ===
- Pac−10/12 Player of the Year – Terry Francona (1980), Chip Hale (1987), Scott Erickson (1989), Alan Zinter (1989), Trevor Crowe (2005), Alex Mejia (2012), Scott Kingery (2015)
- Pac−10/12 Pitcher of the Year – Preston Guilmet (2007)
- Pac−10/12 Defensive Player of the Year – Alex Mejia (2012), Nik McClaughry (2023)
- Pac−10/12 Freshman of the Year – Austin Wells (2019), Daniel Susac (2021)
- Pac−10/12 Coach of the Year – Jerry Kindall (1980, 1989, 1992), Andy Lopez (2012), Jay Johnson (2021), Chip Hale (2024)

=== All-Americans ===
- Brian Anderson
- George Arias
- Smith Bailey
- Dillon Baird
- Nathan Bannister
- Bill Barraclough
- Jacob Berry
- Seth Mejias-Brean
- Dave Breuker
- Jordan Brown
- Cameron Cannon
- Tom Clarkson
- Wes Clements
- Trevor Crowe
- Bobby Dalbec
- Chase Davis
- Keoni DeRenne
- Ben Diggins
- Brandon Dixon
- Shelley Duncan
- Matt Encinas
- Scott Erickson
- Terry Francona
- Zach Gibbons
- John Glenn
- Russ Gragg
- Dick Griesser
- Preston Guilmet
- Dennis Haines
- Alan Hall
- Ron Hassey
- Gil Heredia
- Kurt Heyer
- Nick Hundley
- Lloyd Jenney
- Roger Johnson
- Scott Kingery
- Don Lee
- Eddie Leon
- Kevin Long
- Joe Magrane
- Damon Mashore
- J. J. Matijevic
- Erik Mattern
- Alex Mejia
- Harry Messick
- Steve Mikulic
- Brad Mills
- Robbie Moen
- Tony Morales
- Willie Morales
- Robert Murray
- Kevin Newman
- Pat O’Brien
- Jared Oliva
- Tim Plodinec
- Tony Pluta
- Nick Quintana
- Steve Powers
- Bob Ralston
- Cody Ramer
- Alfonso Rivas
- J. Ray Rokey
- Kiko Romero
- Daniel Schlereth
- Dan Schneider
- Charles Shoemaker
- Joe Skaisgir
- Craig Sorensen
- Dave Stegman
- Jerry Stitt
- Daniel Susac
- Ron Theobald
- Carl Thomas
- Jason Thompson
- Vince Vannelle
- Ed Vosberg
- Cam Walty
- Austin Wells
- Mason White
- Donta’ Williams
- Alan Zinter

== Individual honors ==
=== Notable alumni ===
- Brian Anderson – World Series Champion (2005)
- Steven Ballard – former Chancellor at East Carolina University
- Jett Bandy – catcher, Milwaukee Brewers
- Shelley Duncan – manager of the Scranton/Wilkes-Barre RailRiders (minor league affiliate of the New York Yankees)
- Scott Erickson – All-Star selection (1991), World Series champion (1991).
- Terry Francona – current manager of the Cincinnati Reds, former Manager of the Boston Red Sox and Cleveland Guardians – 2x World Series champion (2004, 2007)
- Kevin Ginkel – Member of the 2023 Arizona Diamondbacks World Series team.
- Dick Griesser – member of the United States national baseball team at the 1956 Summer Olympics
- Chip Hale – former manager of the Arizona Diamondbacks; named Wildcats head coach in July 2021
- Ron Hassey – World Series Champion (1989), only catcher to catch two perfect games.
- Rich Hinton
- Trevor Hoffman – 2nd all-time Major League saves holder with 601 total saves, 7x All-Star (1998–2000, 2002, 2006–2007, 2009), Baseball Hall of Fame inductee, 2017.
- Jack Howell
- Nick Hundley – catcher of the San Francisco Giants
- Jerry Kindall – member of the American Baseball Coaches Association Hall of Fame.
- Scott Kingery – Major League Baseball player for the Philadelphia Phillies
- Don Lee – spent 9 years in the majors with 6 different teams.
- Craig Lefferts – ranked 76th on the MLB All-Time Games Pitched List (696).
- Hank Leiber – 1x All-Star (1938) spent 10 years in the majors for the Chicago Cubs and San Francisco Giants.
- Eddie Leon
- Kenny Lofton – 6x All-Star (1994–99), 4-time Gold Glove Award (1993–96).
- Kevin Long – current hitting coach of the Philadelphia Phillies
- Joe Magrane – led the NL in ERA in 1988 with 2.18.
- Mark Melancon
- Dan Meyer
- Brad Mills – 2x World Series Champion (2004, 2007)
- Mike Paul
- Ryan Perry
- Tim Plodinec – Pan American Games gold medalist
- Rob Refsnyder – utility player for the Boston Red Sox. 2012 College World Series champion and Most Outstanding Player.
- Dan Schneider
- J. T. Snow – 6x Gold Glove Award winner (1995, 1996, 1997, 1998, 1999, 2000)
- Dave Stegman
- Cal Stevenson – baseball outfielder for the San Francisco Giants
- Tyler Stotts - Most Shut out games in a single season(2008)
- Ed Vosberg – World Series Champion (1997)

=== Current MLB Players ===
Name	Draft Year	Team
Kevin Ginkel	2016	Arizona Diamondbacks
Tylor Megill	2018	New York Mets
Andrew Nardi	2019	Miami Marlins
César Salazar	2018	Houston Astros
Chase Silseth	2021	Texas Rangers
Cal Stevenson	2018	Detroit Tigers
Daniel Susac	2022	San Francisco Giants
Austin Wells	2020	New York Yankees

=== Hall of Fame inductees ===
One Arizona player and two coaches have been inducted into the College Baseball Hall of Fame.

College Baseball Hall of Fame inductees
Year Inducted	Name	Position	Career
2007	Jerry Kindall	Head Coach	1973–1996
2011	Terry Francona	OF	1977–1980
2012	Frank Sancet	Head Coach	1950–1972

=== Retired jerseys ===
Student-Athlete jerseys are retired but not individual player numbers.

No.	Player
1	John Salmon
2	Lee Franklin
15	Trevor Hoffman
32	Terry Francona
41	Kelsey Osburn

== Rivalries ==
=== Arizona State ===
Arizona's main rival is Arizona State. Although they are famously known for their rivalry in football and basketball as well as softball, both schools have had a rich baseball tradition in their history. The Wildcats lead the Sun Devils in all time baseball series 267–237–1 as of April 14th, 2026 and both teams have had several players drafted into MLB.

In recent years, Arizona has had an edge over Arizona State in college baseball success. In 2010 ASU won the Pac-10 and also advanced to the College World Series, capping the end of a dominating run of 4 straight Pac-10 conference championships and 3 CWS appearances in 4 years (missed CWS in 2008). Later, the NCAA would vacate the 2007 Pac-10 Championship and 2007 CWS appearance from ASU's record.

Since then Arizona has won the CWS (2012), was the CWS runner-up (2016) and won two Pac-12 Championships (2021 & 2024). In contrast to Arizona's recent success, ASU has not won the Pac-10/12 Conference since 2010, has not been the CWS runner up since 1988 and has not won an NCAA Championship since 1981. Arizona has won 2 NCAA championships since 1981. While ASU still has a more robust historical record (5x NCAA Champs, 1965, 1967, 1969, 1977, 1981 and 21x CWS appearances), Arizona has narrowed that gap in the last 20 years.

== See also ==
- List of NCAA Division I baseball programs
- 1976 College World Series
- 1980 College World Series
- 1986 College World Series
- 2004 College World Series
- 2012 College World Series
- 2016 College World Series
