= Shelley Duncan =

American baseball player (born 1979)

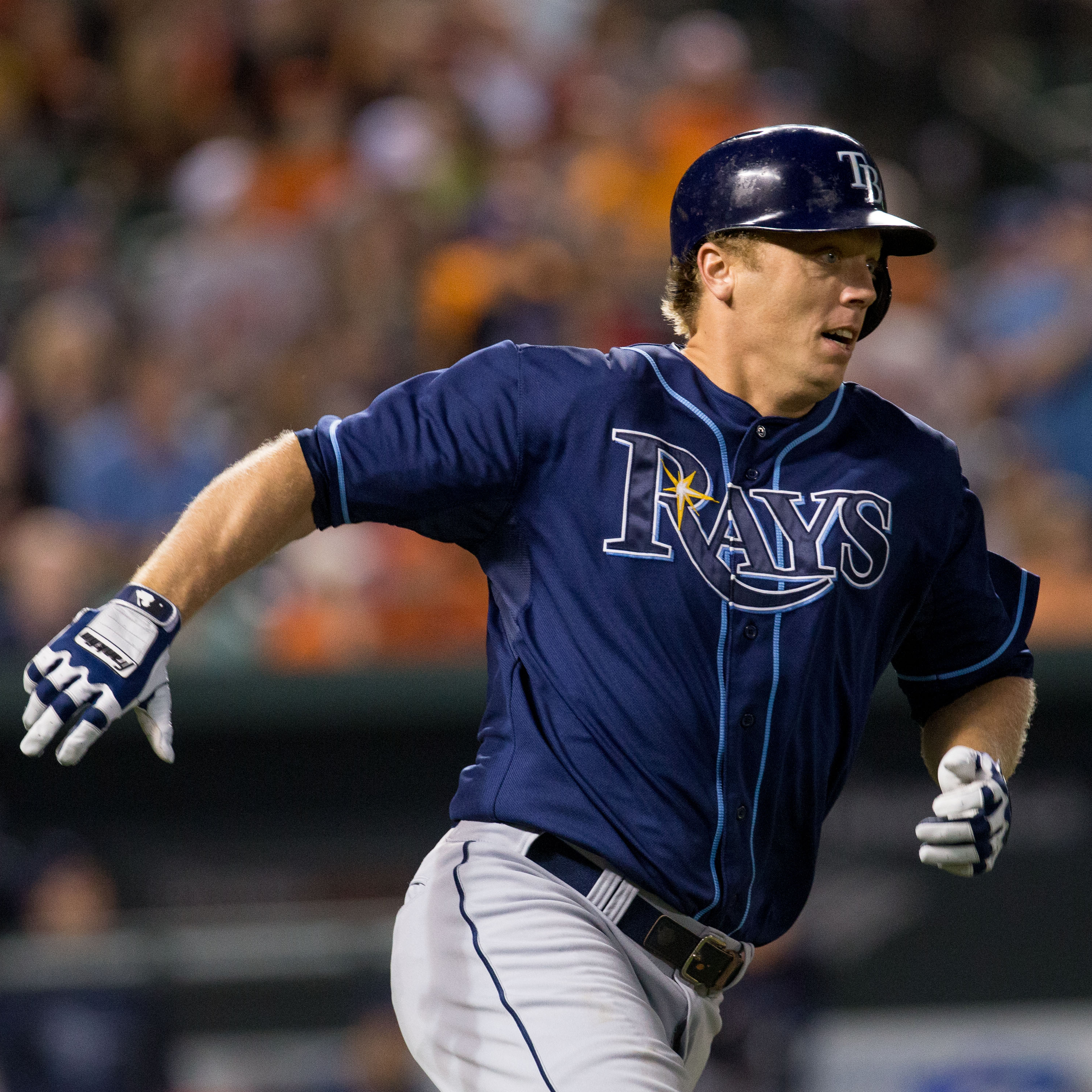
- Duncan with the Rays in April 2013

Boston Red Sox
- Left fielder / Designated hitter / First baseman / Coach
- Born: September 29, 1979 (age 47); Tucson, Arizona, U.S.
- Batted: Right Threw: Right

MLB debut
- July 20, 2007, for the New York Yankees

Last MLB appearance
- April 27, 2013, for the Tampa Bay Rays

MLB statistics
- Batting average: .226
- Home runs: 43
- Runs batted in: 144
- Stats at Baseball Reference

Teams
- As player: New York Yankees (2007–2009); Cleveland Indians (2010–2012); Tampa Bay Rays (2013); As coach: Toronto Blue Jays (2019–2020); Chicago White Sox (2021-2022)

David Shelley Duncan (born September 29, 1979) is an American former professional baseball player. He was a left fielder, designated hitter, and first baseman. Duncan played in Major League Baseball (MLB) for the New York Yankees, Cleveland Indians, and Tampa Bay Rays. He was the Major League field coordinator for the Toronto Blue Jays, and later served as the analytics coordinator for the Chicago White Sox.

== Amateur career ==
=== High school ===
Shelley graduated from Canyon del Oro High School, located in the Tucson suburb of Oro Valley, in 1998. While there he was a teammate of former All Star second baseman Ian Kinsler. He played on the school's 1997 baseball team that went on to capture the 5A State Championship title.

=== College career ===
In 1999 he was a Freshman First Team All-American outfielder while attending the University of Arizona. In 2001, he was named First Team College All-American outfielder and Pacific-10 Conference All-Star. He was selected by the Yankees in the second round of the 2001 Major League Baseball draft, 62nd overall.

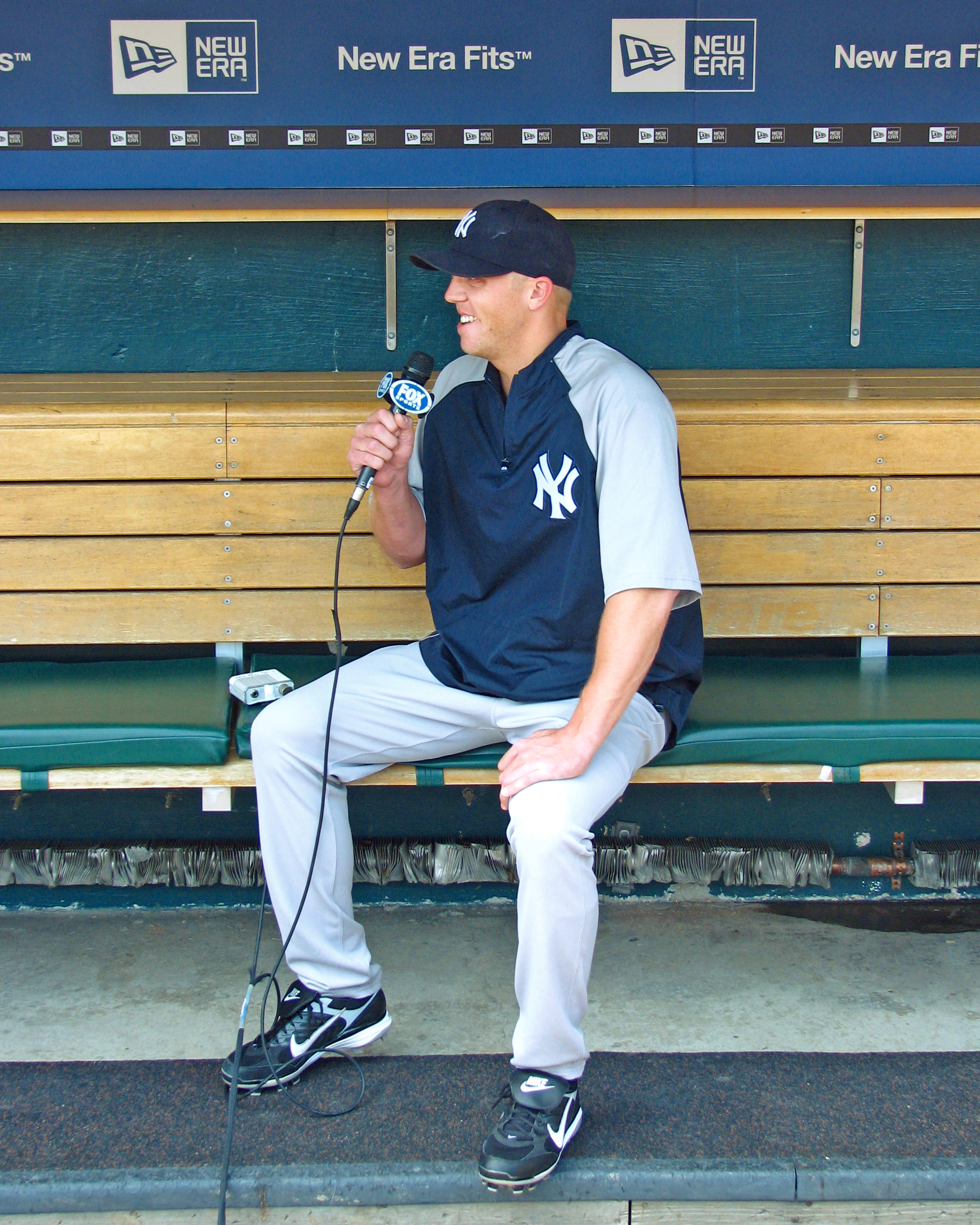
Duncan during his tenure with the New York Yankees in 2008

== Professional career ==
=== New York Yankees ===
Duncan's slugging percentage was .410 with the Staten Island Yankees in 2001. He played outfield for the Greensboro Bats in 2002, where he had a .375 on-base percentage and 10 assists from the outfield in 69 games.

Playing with the Tampa Yankees of the Florida State League in 2004, Duncan hit 19 home runs in 424 at bats. With the Trenton Thunder in 2005, he hit a league-leading 34 home runs and had 92 RBIs. He was named an Eastern League (AA) mid-season and post-season All-Star first baseman. He was also the winner of the 2005 Eastern League All-Star Game Home Run Derby. In 2006, he hit 19 home runs for Trenton in 351 at-bats, and was twice the league's player of the week.

In 2007, Duncan was a member of the International League All-Star Team, and was the Topps IL Player of the Month in May while playing for the Triple-A Scranton/Wilkes-Barre Yankees. While with the Yankees AAA team, Duncan had 25 home runs, second in the International League at the time he was called up, and hit .295 with a .577 slugging percentage in 336 at-bats.

Duncan made his major league debut on July 20, 2007, as the designated hitter against the Tampa Bay Devil Rays, and recorded his first career hit and RBI. The next day, he hit his first major league home run against the Devil Rays, and the following day had his first multi-home run game, going deep twice in front of the Yankee Stadium crowd. Duncan later hit his fourth Major League home run at Yankee Stadium on July 31, 2007, against the Chicago White Sox. He spent time in 2008 with both the major league Yankees, and the Scranton/Wilkes-Barre Yankees, before suffering a shoulder separation. Duncan remained in Scranton/Wilkes-Barre for the remainder of the season. He was designated for assignment that offseason, but cleared waivers and remained in the Yankees organization.

On July 31, 2009, Duncan was recalled from Scranton/Wilkes-Barre temporarily as an extra bat. He was optioned the following day and recalled again on September 7. In each of his three starts, he went 1-for-3 and recorded one RBI. Duncan was named the International League Most Valuable Player for 2009 leading the league in home runs and RBIs. Following the 2009 season, Duncan was outrighted to Scranton/Wilkes-Barre, but refused the assignment and elected to become a free agent.

=== Cleveland Indians ===
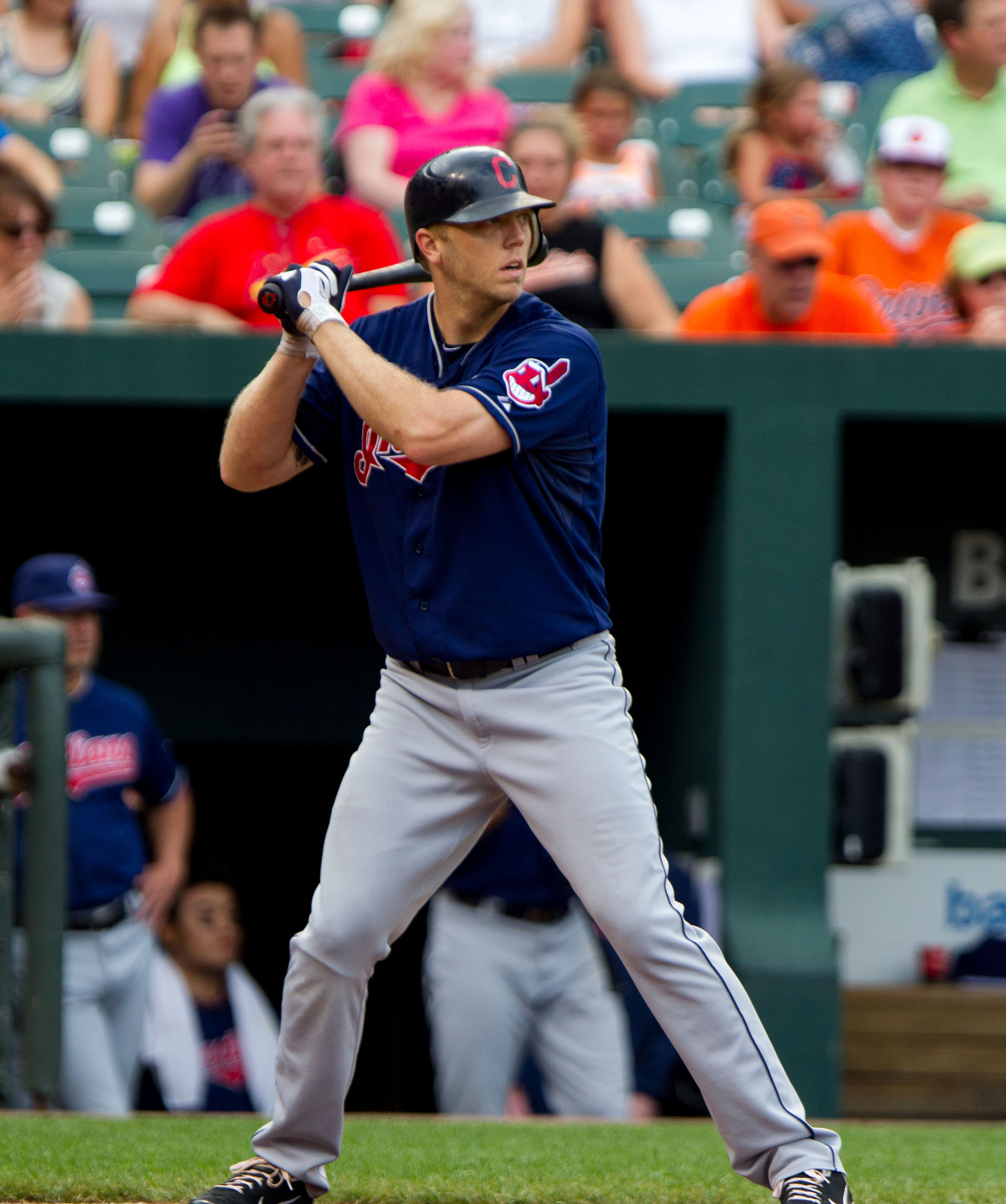
Duncan batting for the Cleveland Indians in 2012

On January 4, 2010, Duncan signed a contract with the Cleveland Indians. He began the season with the Triple-A Columbus Clippers.

The Indians designated Duncan for assignment on August 29, 2012. In 81 games with the club during the 2012 season, he hit .203 with 11 home runs and 31 RBIs.

=== Tampa Bay Rays ===
On January 22, 2013, Duncan signed a minor league deal with the Tampa Bay Rays. He was designated for assignment on April 30, 2013. He declared free agency on October 11.

=== Arizona Diamondbacks ===
On January 24, 2014, Duncan signed a minor league deal with the Arizona Diamondbacks.

=== Cincinnati Reds ===
Duncan signed a minor league contract with the Cincinnati Reds on May 9, 2014. Duncan was released by the Reds organization on June 18.

== Coaching career ==
=== Arizona Diamondbacks ===
On January 7, 2015, Duncan was announced as the new manager for the Arizona Diamondbacks' Low-A affiliate, the Hillsboro Hops of the Northwest League. On February 6, 2017, Duncan was named the manager of the Diamondbacks' High-A affiliate, the Visalia Rawhide. Duncan was the manager of the Diamondbacks' Double-A affiliate, the Jackson Generals, for the 2018 season. They subsequently won the 2018 Southern League Championship.

=== Toronto Blue Jays ===
On November 26, 2018, Duncan was hired by the Toronto Blue Jays to be their Major League field coordinator.

=== Chicago White Sox ===
On December 1, 2020, Duncan was hired by the Chicago White Sox to be their analytics coordinator.

=== New York Yankees ===
On January 20, 2023, Duncan was hired to manage the Scranton/Wilkes-Barre RailRiders, the Triple-A affiliate for the New York Yankees.

Following the 2025 season, Duncan was named the International League manager of the year after leading the RailRiders to an 87-win season.

=== Boston Red Sox ===
On November 5, 2026, the Boston Red Sox announced they were hiring Duncan to serve on their major league coaching staff.

== Controversies ==
Duncan was involved in some minor controversy on September 14, 2007, when, before the game between the Yankees and Red Sox at Fenway Park, Duncan wrote "Red Sox Suck!" along with his autograph on a 10-year-old Red Sox fan's notebook.

During a spring training game on March 12, 2008, against the Tampa Bay Rays, after safely reaching first due to an error, Duncan continued on to second base, spiking second baseman Akinori Iwamura who had caught the ball well before Duncan arrived. Iwamura sustained a cut above his right knee but was otherwise fine, and Duncan was tagged out regardless. This followed the Rays’ Elliot Johnson's aggressive hit on Yankee catcher Francisco Cervelli, which resulted in a broken wrist for the catcher. A bench-clearing brawl ensued, after which Duncan and Rays right fielder Jonny Gomes were ejected, as were two of the Yankees' coaches, Bobby Meacham and Kevin Long. On March 14, Duncan, teammate Melky Cabrera and Gomes were suspended for their actions on the field. Each of these three players' suspensions was reduced one day in length after they decided to drop their appeal of the suspensions.

== Personal life ==
Duncan is the oldest son of Dave Duncan, an MLB catcher and pitching coach. His late younger brother, Chris, was also an MLB first baseman and outfielder. As of 2018, Duncan is married to his wife Kirsten Duncan. They live in Tucson, Arizona.

== See also ==
- List of second-generation Major League Baseball players
