= Keoni DeRenne =

American baseball coach (born 1979)

- Coach
- Born: April 30, 1979 (age 47); Honolulu, Hawaii, U.S.
- Bats: Switch Throws: Right
- Stats at Baseball Reference

Teams
- As coach: Kansas City Royals (2022–2025)
Medals
Men's baseball
Representing United States
World Junior Baseball Championship
Bronze medal – third place	1996 Sancti Spíritus	Team

Keoni Beau DeRenne (born April 30, 1979) is an American professional baseball coach who coached for the Kansas City Royals of Major League Baseball (MLB) from 2022 to 2025.

== Career ==
DeRenne attended ʻIolani School in Honolulu, Hawaii, graduating in 1997. He enrolled at the University of Arizona, where he played college baseball for the Arizona Wildcats, where he was named to the All-Pac-10 Conference team as a shortstop. The Atlanta Braves selected DeRenne in the 12th round of the 2000 MLB draft, and he played in Minor League Baseball for the Braves, New York Yankees, Arizona Diamondbacks, Boston Red Sox, and Philadelphia Phillies organizations for eight seasons, followed by another three seasons in independent league baseball.

In 2012, DeRenne became a coach. After coaching in the Pittsburgh Pirates and Chicago Cubs organizations, he joined the Kansas City Royals organization for the 2020 season. The Royals named him their assistant hitting coach after the 2021 season. On October 5, 2025, general manager J. J. Picollo announced that DeRenne would not return to the team for the 2026 season.

In 2026, DeRenne was named as hitting coach for the Durham Bulls, the Triple-A affiliate of the Tampa Bay Rays. On July 2, 2026, DeRenne was announced as the hitting coach for the National League at the All-Star Futures Game.

== Personal life ==
His great-grandfather was Wilbur Cooper.
