= Colin Porter =

American baseball player (born 1975)

- Outfielder
- Born: November 23, 1975 (age 50); Tucson, Arizona, U.S.
- Batted: Left Threw: Left

MLB debut
- May 30, 2003, for the Houston Astros

Last MLB appearance
- May 23, 2004, for the St. Louis Cardinals

MLB statistics
- Batting average: .254
- Home runs: 1
- Runs batted in: 2
- Stats at Baseball Reference

Teams
- Houston Astros (2003); St. Louis Cardinals (2004)

Colin Frederick Porter (born November 23, 1975) is an American former professional baseball player. He attended Canyon Del Oro High School in Oro Valley, Arizona, and the University of Arizona in Tucson, Arizona.

An outfielder, Porter reached the Major League Baseball level in 2003 with the Houston Astros and also the St. Louis Cardinals in 2004.

Drafted by the Astros in the 17th round of the 1998 Major League Baseball draft, Porter made his major league debut on May 30, 2003. On January 22, 2004, he was claimed off waivers by the St. Louis Cardinals. Porter became a free agent after the season and signed with the New York Yankees on November 18. He was released by the Yankees on July 22, 2005, after batting only .181 combined for Double-A and Triple-A. On July 25, he signed with the Arizona Diamondbacks and played for Triple-A Tucson, becoming a free agent after the season.

He married his high school sweetheart, Dawn Allen, and they share two children. He is now a firefighter with the Tucson Fire Department.
