= Bill Kinneberg =

American baseball coach (born 1957)

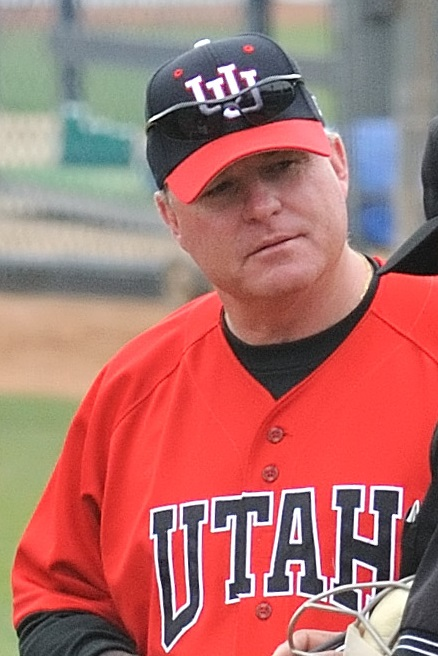
- Kinneberg in 2009

Biographical details
- Born: July 4, 1957 (age 68); Sewell, Chile

Playing career
- 1976–1977: Central Arizona
- 1978–1979: Arizona
- Position: Pitcher

Coaching career (HC unless noted)
- 1981–1984: UTEP (assistant)
- 1985: UTEP
- 1986–1992: Wyoming
- 1993–1994: Arizona State (assistant)
- 1996: Utah
- 1997–2001: Arizona (assistant)
- 2005–2021: Utah

Head coaching record
- Overall: 625–717–1

Accomplishments and honors

Awards
- WAC Coach of the Year (1990); Pac-12 Coach of the Year (2016)

William Arthur Kinneberg (born July 4, 1957) is an American former college baseball coach. He served as the head baseball coach of the Utah Utes in 1996 and again from 2005 to 2021.

== Early life and education ==
Born in Sewell, Chile, Kinneberg grew up in Douglas and Morenci, Arizona and Silver City, New Mexico, where he graduated from Silver High School in 1975.

Kinneberg began his college baseball career at the junior college level pitching for Central Arizona College from 1976 to 1977 and transferred to the University of Arizona to play for the Arizona Wildcats from 1978 to 1979 under Jerry Kindall. As a senior in 1979, Kinneberg had a 7–4 record and led Arizona to an appearance in the College World Series.

Kinneberg was a pitcher for the Arizona Wildcats, owning a 7–4 record with 7 saves over two seasons. He appeared in the 1979 College World Series with the Wildcats.

== Coaching career ==
After ending his playing career, Kinneberg was hired as an assistant at UTEP. He served in that role for four seasons before assuming the head coaching role for the 1985 season. In what was to be the last season of baseball at UTEP, Kinneberg led the Miners to a program record 33 wins. After the end of UTEP's program, he moved to Wyoming, setting a program record for wins in Laramie in 1990 with a 37–18 record. Kinneberg earned Western Athletic Conference Coach of the Year honors for the 1990 season, and coached 16 All-Conference players at Wyoming. Ironically, the Cowboys program was shut down in 1996, just four years after Kinneberg's departure for Arizona State. Kinneberg spent two seasons with the Sun Devils, helping to guide them to consecutive College World Series appearances.

Kinneberg spent one season as a pitching coach in the Chicago White Sox system, before returning to college head coaching at Utah for the 1996 season. He led the Utes to a 30–22 season and a third-place finish in the WAC. He then accepted an associate head coaching position at Arizona, helping the Wildcats to a Regional appearance during his five years in Tucson.

Utah again offered him their head coaching position 2005. During his second stint with the Utes, Kinneberg led the team to their first-ever MWC title and first NCAA tournament appearance since 1960, coached three high level Major League Baseball draft picks, including Utah's first-ever first round pick (C. J. Cron), and now leads the Utes in their new home in the Pac-12 Conference. Kinneberg was named Pac-12 Baseball Coach of the Year in 2016 after leading the Utes to their first-ever Pac-12 Conference title.

Kinneberg also has coached USA Baseball's National Team (collegiate), beginning as a pitching coach in 1999, and as head coach in 2007 and 2010.

== Personal life ==
Kinneberg and his wife, Janet, have two sons, Joe and David.Joe currently plays baseball at Western Nebraska Community College (WNCC)

== Head coaching record ==
The following is a table of Kinneberg's yearly records as an NCAA head baseball coach.

Record table
Season	Team	Overall	Conference	Standing	Postseason
UTEP (Western Athletic Conference) (1985)
1985	UTEP	33–26	11–13	3rd (Southern)	
UTEP:		33–26	11–13		
Wyoming (Western Athletic Conference) (1986–1992)
1986	Wyoming	29–19	16–7	1st (Eastern)	
1987	Wyoming	27–22	11–12	3rd (Western)	
1988	Wyoming	25–27	14–13	4th	
1989	Wyoming	36–21	17–10	4th	
1990	Wyoming	37–18	20–8	3rd	
1991	Wyoming	31–22	14–12	4th	
1992	Wyoming	27–28	11–14	5th	
Wyoming:		212–157	103–76		
Utah Utes (Western Athletic Conference) (1996)
1996	Utah	30–22	15–15	T–3rd	
Utah Utes (Mountain West Conference) (2005–2011)
2005	Utah	19–36	10–20	5th	
2006	Utah	28–28	9–13	6th	
2007	Utah	24–31	12–12	T–3rd	
2008	Utah	26–28	10–14	T–4th	
2009	Utah	28–31	8–16	6th	NCAA Regional
2010	Utah	23–28	10–13	6th	
2011	Utah	29–21	16–7	2nd	
Utah Utes (Pac-12 Conference) (2012–2021)
2012	Utah	14–42	7–23	11th	
2013	Utah	21–31	7–23	11th	
2014	Utah	16–36	4–26	11th	
2015	Utah	17–35–1	7–22–1	11th	
2016	Utah	26–29	19–11	1st	NCAA Regional
2017	Utah	24–24	12–15	7th	
2018	Utah	16–39	8–22	11th	
2019	Utah	16–33	6–24	10th	
2020	Utah	6–7	0–0		Season canceled due to COVID-19
2021	Utah	17–33	7–23	10th	
Utah:		380–534–1	167–299–1		
Total:		625–717–1			
National champion Postseason invitational champion Conference regular season champion Conference regular season and conference tournament champion Division regular season champion Division regular season and conference tournament champion Conference tournament champion
