= 1984 Oklahoma State Cowboys baseball team =

American college baseball season

1984 Oklahoma State Cowboys baseball

Big Eight champions Midwest Regional champions

College World Series, 3rd
- Conference: Big Eight Conference
- Record: 61–15 (15–3 Big 8)
- Head coach: Gary Ward (7th season)
- Pitching coach: Tom Holliday (7th season)
- Home stadium: Allie P. Reynolds Stadium

1984 Big Eight Conference baseball standings
| | Conf. | | | | Overall |
| Team | W | | L | PCT | W | | L | PCT |
|---|---|---|---|---|---|---|---|---|
| No. 3 Oklahoma State ‍†‍‡‍^{y} | 15 | – | 3 | .833 | 61 | – | 15 | .803 |
| No. 26 Oklahoma ‍‍‍^{y} | 14 | – | 4 | .778 | 42 | – | 15 | .737 |
| No. 29 Nebraska ‍‍‍ | 15 | – | 6 | .714 | 46 | – | 20 | .697 |
| Missouri ‍‍‍ | 7 | – | 8 | .467 | 27 | – | 20 | .574 |
| Iowa State ‍‍‍ | 6 | – | 12 | .333 | 18 | – | 27 | .400 |
| Kansas ‍‍‍ | 4 | – | 14 | .222 | 24 | – | 25 | .490 |
| Kansas State ‍‍‍ | 4 | – | 18 | .182 | 14 | – | 24 | .368 |
† – Conference champion ‡ – Tournament champion y – Invited to the NCAA tournament As of June 30, 1984; Rankings from Collegiate Baseball

The 1984 Oklahoma State Cowboys baseball team represented the Oklahoma State University in the 1984 NCAA Division I baseball season. The Cowboys played their home games at Allie P. Reynolds Stadium. The team was coached by Gary Ward in his 7th year at Oklahoma State.

The Cowboys won the Midwest Regional to advance to the College World Series, where they were defeated by the Cal State Fullerton Titans.

== Roster ==
1984 Oklahoma State Cowboys baseball team
Players
Coaches

| # | Pos. | Name | B/T | Height | Weight | Year | Home town |
|---|---|---|---|---|---|---|---|
| | C | John Apicella | / | — | — | So | Uniontown, Pennsylvania |
| | RHP | Chris Bayley | /R | — | — |
| | INF | Chris Beck | / | — | — |
| | | Brad Bell | / | — | — |
| 23 | RHP | Jeff Bronkey | R/R | 6 ft 3 in (1.91 m) | 215 lb (98 kg) | | Klamath Falls, Oregon |
| 1 | OF | Doug Dascenzo | S/R | 5 ft 7 in (1.7 m) | 150 lb (68 kg) | | Brownsville, Pennsylvania |
| | C | Mike Day | L/R | 5 ft 11 in (1.8 m) | 200 lb (91 kg) |
| | C | Carlos Diaz | R/R | 6 ft 3 in (1.91 m) | 190 lb (86 kg) | | Elizabeth, New Jersey |
| | RHP | John Duval | /R | — | — |
| | INF | Sergio Espinal | R/R | 6 ft 0 in (1.83 m) | 175 lb (79 kg) | So |
| | RHP | John Farrell | R/R | 6 ft 4 in (1.93 m) | 210 lb (95 kg) | Sr | Monmouth Beach, New Jersey |
| | | Kevin Fowler | / | — | — | | Stillwater, Oklahoma |
| | OF | Mike Garner | / | — | — |
| 7 | INF | Gary Green | R/R | 6 ft 3 in (1.91 m) | 175 lb (79 kg) | | Pittsburgh, Pennsylvania |
| | RHP | Mike Henneman | R/R | 6 ft 4 in (1.93 m) | 205 lb (93 kg) | | St. Charles, Missouri |
| 29 | OF | Pete Incaviglia | R/R | 6 ft 1 in (1.85 m) | 225 lb (102 kg) | So | Pebble Beach, California |
| | INF | Kevin Jagielo | L/ | — | — |
| | RHP | Gary Kanwisher | /R | 6 ft 3 in (1.91 m) | 200 lb (91 kg) | | Hillsdale, New Jersey |
| | OF | Bryan Kostishion | / | — | — |
| | LHP | Reese Lambert | L/L | 6 ft 4 in (1.93 m) | 195 lb (88 kg) |
| | P | Steve Lienhard | / | — | — |
| 10 | LHP | Dennis Livingston | R/L | 6 ft 0 in (1.83 m) | 185 lb (84 kg) | Jr | North Reading, Massachusetts |
| | P | Andy Olson | / | — | — |
| | RHP | Marv Rockman | /R | 6 ft 0 in (1.83 m) | 180 lb (82 kg) |
| | P | Scott Sadler | / | — | — |
| | P | Durrell Schoenly | / | — | — |
| | OF | Billy Smith | R/R | 6 ft 0 in (1.83 m) | 185 lb (84 kg) |
| | LHP | Mike Trapasso | L/L | 6 ft 1 in (1.85 m) | 185 lb (84 kg) | Jr | St. Louis, Missouri |
| 25 | | Scott Wade | R/R | 6 ft 2 in (1.88 m) | 200 lb (91 kg) | Jr | Seabrook, Maryland |
| | RHP | Rob Walton | /R | 5 ft 10 in (1.78 m) | 165 lb (75 kg) | | Rutherford, New Jersey |
| 3 | INF | Randy Whisler | R/R | 5 ft 9 in (1.75 m) | 170 lb (77 kg) | | Klamath Falls, Oregon |

Head coach

20 Gary Ward

Assistant coach(es)

Wade Robertson

Pitching coach(es)

Tom Holliday

Legend

- (C) Team captain
- (S) Suspended
- (I) Ineligible
- Injured
- Current redshirt

Roster
Last update: February 28, 2021

== Schedule ==
1984 Oklahoma State Cowboys baseball game log
Regular season
February (3–3)

| # | Date | Opponent | Site/stadium | Score | Overall record | Big 8 record |
|---|---|---|---|---|---|---|
| 1 | February 24 | at Arizona | Wildcat Field • Tucson, Arizona | 10–7 | 1–0 | – |
| 2 | February 25 | at Arizona | Wildcat Field • Tucson, Arizona | 21–13 | 2–0 | – |
| 3 | February 26 | at Arizona | Wildcat Field • Tucson, Arizona | 12–11 | 3–0 | – |
| 4 | February 27 | at Arizona State | Packard Stadium • Tempe, Arizona | 5–9 | 3–1 | – |
| 5 | February 28 | at Arizona State | Packard Stadium • Tempe, Arizona | 0–4 | 3–2 | – |
| 6 | February 29 | at Arizona State | Packard Stadium • Tempe, Arizona | 9–10 | 3–3 | – |

March (18–5)

| # | Date | Opponent | Site/stadium | Score | Overall record | Big 8 record |
|---|---|---|---|---|---|---|
| 7 | March 1 | at UNLV | Unknown • Las Vegas, Nevada | 2–12 | 3–4 | – |
| 8 | March 2 | vs BYU | Unknown • Las Vegas, Nevada | 4–15 | 3–5 | – |
| 9 | March 3 | vs BYU | Unknown • Las Vegas, Nevada | 8–1 | 4–5 | – |
| 10 | March 4 | at UNLV | Unknown • Las Vegas, Nevada | 16–4 | 5–5 | – |
| 11 | March 5 | at Texas–Pan American | Unknown • Edinburg, Texas | 6–4 | 6–5 | – |
| 12 | March 6 | at Texas–Pan American | Unknown • Edinburg, Texas | 4–7 | 6–6 | – |
| 13 | March 7 | vs Temple | Unknown • Edinburg, Texas | 15–6 | 7–6 | – |
| 14 | March 8 | vs Penn State | Unknown • Edinburg, Texas | 5–1 | 8–6 | – |
| 15 | March 9 | vs Morningside | Unknown • Edinburg, Texas | 10–0 | 9–6 | – |
| 16 | March 10 | vs Morningside | Unknown • Edinburg, Texas | 12–1 | 10–6 | – |
| 17 | March 14 | Texas Tech | Allie P. Reynolds Stadium • Stillwater, Oklahoma | 4–6 | 10–7 | – |
| 18 | March 14 | Texas Tech | Allie P. Reynolds Stadium • Stillwater, Oklahoma | 11–0 | 11–7 | – |
| 19 | March 15 | Texas Tech | Allie P. Reynolds Stadium • Stillwater, Oklahoma | 3–2 | 12–7 | – |
| 20 | March 17 | Fort Hays State | Allie P. Reynolds Stadium • Stillwater, Oklahoma | 9–1 | 13–7 | – |
| 21 | March 17 | Fort Hays State | Allie P. Reynolds Stadium • Stillwater, Oklahoma | 14–0 | 14–7 | – |
| 22 | March 21 | North Texas State | Allie P. Reynolds Stadium • Stillwater, Oklahoma | 8–3 | 15–7 | – |
| 23 | March 21 | North Texas State | Allie P. Reynolds Stadium • Stillwater, Oklahoma | 4–0 | 16–7 | – |
| 24 | March 24 | Iowa State | Allie P. Reynolds Stadium • Stillwater, Oklahoma | 9–1 | 17–7 | 1–0 |
| 25 | March 24 | Iowa State | Allie P. Reynolds Stadium • Stillwater, Oklahoma | 7–0 | 18–7 | 2–0 |
| 26 | March 25 | Iowa State | Allie P. Reynolds Stadium • Stillwater, Oklahoma | 13–9 | 19–7 | 3–0 |
| 27 | March 25 | Iowa State | Allie P. Reynolds Stadium • Stillwater, Oklahoma | 4–3 | 20–7 | 4–0 |
| 28 | March 28 | at North Texas State | Mack Park • Denton, Texas | 12–7 | 21–7 | 4–0 |
| 29 | March 31 | at Oklahoma | L. Dale Mitchell Baseball Park • Norman, Oklahoma | 4–5 | 21–8 | 4–1 |

April (20–2)

| # | Date | Opponent | Site/stadium | Score | Overall record | Big 8 record |
|---|---|---|---|---|---|---|
| 30 | April 1 | Oklahoma | L. Dale Mitchell Baseball Park • Norman, Oklahoma | 1–2 | 21–9 | 4–2 |
| 31 | April 5 | Minnesota | Allie P. Reynolds Stadium • Stillwater, Oklahoma | 7–1 | 22–9 | 4–2 |
| 32 | April 7 | Kansas State | Allie P. Reynolds Stadium • Stillwater, Oklahoma | 15–7 | 23–9 | 5–2 |
| 33 | April 8 | Kansas State | Allie P. Reynolds Stadium • Stillwater, Oklahoma | 11–3 | 24–9 | 6–2 |
| 34 | April 9 | Kansas State | Allie P. Reynolds Stadium • Stillwater, Oklahoma | 7–0 | 25–9 | 7–2 |
| 35 | April 10 | Kansas State | Allie P. Reynolds Stadium • Stillwater, Oklahoma | 10–1 | 26–9 | 8–2 |
| 36 | April 11 | at Oklahoma City | Jim Wade Stadium • Oklahoma City, Oklahoma | 11–5 | 27–9 | 8–2 |
| 37 | April 13 | Texas Wesleyan | Allie P. Reynolds Stadium • Stillwater, Oklahoma | 7–2 | 28–9 | 8–2 |
| 38 | April 14 | Texas Wesleyan | Allie P. Reynolds Stadium • Stillwater, Oklahoma | 9–6 | 29–9 | 8–2 |
| 39 | April 14 | Texas Wesleyan | Allie P. Reynolds Stadium • Stillwater, Oklahoma | 11–3 | 30–9 | 8–2 |
| 40 | April 15 | Texas Wesleyan | Allie P. Reynolds Stadium • Stillwater, Oklahoma | 1–11 | 30–10 | 8–2 |
| 41 | April 17 | at Oklahoma City | Jim Wade Stadium • Oklahoma City, Oklahoma | 17–12 | 31–10 | 8–2 |
| 42 | April 18 | Arkansas Tech | Allie P. Reynolds Stadium • Stillwater, Oklahoma | 21–0 | 32–10 | 8–2 |
| 43 | April 18 | Arkansas Tech | Allie P. Reynolds Stadium • Stillwater, Oklahoma | 7–2 | 33–10 | 8–2 |
| 44 | April 19 | Arkansas Tech | Allie P. Reynolds Stadium • Stillwater, Oklahoma | 11–6 | 34–10 | 8–2 |
| 45 | April 19 | Arkansas Tech | Allie P. Reynolds Stadium • Stillwater, Oklahoma | 7–2 | 35–10 | 8–2 |
| 46 | April 24 | Missouri Southern | Allie P. Reynolds Stadium • Stillwater, Oklahoma | 11–4 | 36–10 | 8–2 |
| 47 | April 24 | Missouri Southern | Allie P. Reynolds Stadium • Stillwater, Oklahoma | 6–1 | 37–10 | 8–2 |
| 48 | April 28 | Kansas | Allie P. Reynolds Stadium • Stillwater, Oklahoma | 8–3 | 38–10 | 9–2 |
| 49 | April 28 | Kansas | Allie P. Reynolds Stadium • Stillwater, Oklahoma | 7–0 | 39–10 | 10–2 |
| 50 | April 29 | Kansas | Allie P. Reynolds Stadium • Stillwater, Oklahoma | 14–10 | 40–10 | 11–2 |
| 51 | April 29 | Kansas | Allie P. Reynolds Stadium • Stillwater, Oklahoma | 9–0 | 41–10 | 12–2 |

May (7–1)

| # | Date | Opponent | Site/stadium | Score | Overall record | Big 8 record |
|---|---|---|---|---|---|---|
| 52 | May 1 | Arkansas–Little Rock | Allie P. Reynolds Stadium • Stillwater, Oklahoma | 13–2 | 42–10 | 12–2 |
| 53 | May 1 | Arkansas–Little Rock | Allie P. Reynolds Stadium • Stillwater, Oklahoma | 5–0 | 43–10 | 12–2 |
| 54 | May 2 | Arkansas–Little Rock | Allie P. Reynolds Stadium • Stillwater, Oklahoma | 16–6 | 44–10 | 12–2 |
| 55 | May 2 | Arkansas–Little Rock | Allie P. Reynolds Stadium • Stillwater, Oklahoma | 13–6 | 45–10 | 12–2 |
| 56 | May 5 | at Nebraska | Buck Beltzer Stadium • Lincoln, Nebraska | 11–1 | 46–10 | 13–2 |
| 57 | May 5 | at Nebraska | Buck Beltzer Stadium • Lincoln, Nebraska | 0–4 | 46–11 | 13–3 |
| 58 | May 6 | at Nebraska | Buck Beltzer Stadium • Lincoln, Nebraska | 5–4 | 47–11 | 14–3 |
| 59 | May 6 | at Nebraska | Buck Beltzer Stadium • Lincoln, Nebraska | 3–2 | 48–11 | 15–3 |

Postseason
Big Eight Conference Tournament (4–1)

| # | Date | Opponent | Site/stadium | Score | Overall record | Big 8 record |
|---|---|---|---|---|---|---|
| 60 | May 19 | vs Missouri | Unknown • Oklahoma City, Oklahoma | 10–6 | 49–11 | 15–3 |
| 61 | May 20 | vs Nebraska | Unknown • Oklahoma City, Oklahoma | 7–3 | 50–11 | 15–3 |
| 62 | May 21 | vs Oklahoma | Unknown • Oklahoma City, Oklahoma | 13–4 | 51–11 | 15–3 |

May (3–1)

| # | Date | Opponent | Site/stadium | Score | Overall record | Big 8 record |
|---|---|---|---|---|---|---|
| 63 | May 22 | Lamar | Allie P. Reynolds Stadium • Stillwater, Oklahoma | 15–6 | 52–11 | 15–3 |
| 64 | May 22 | Lamar | Allie P. Reynolds Stadium • Stillwater, Oklahoma | 3–6 | 52–12 | 15–3 |
| 65 | May 23 | Lamar | Allie P. Reynolds Stadium • Stillwater, Oklahoma | 6–0 | 53–12 | 15–3 |
| 66 | May 23 | Lamar | Allie P. Reynolds Stadium • Stillwater, Oklahoma | 14–6 | 54–12 | 15–3 |

NCAA Midwest Regional (4–1)

| # | Date | Opponent | Site/stadium | Score | Overall record | Big 8 record |
|---|---|---|---|---|---|---|
| 67 | May 24 | Grambling State | Allie P. Reynolds Stadium • Stillwater, Oklahoma | 21–5 | 55–12 | 15–3 |
| 68 | May 25 | Oklahoma City | Allie P. Reynolds Stadium • Stillwater, Oklahoma | 2–5 | 55–13 | 15–3 |
| 69 | May 26 | Texas A&M | Allie P. Reynolds Stadium • Stillwater, Oklahoma | 5–0 | 56–13 | 15–3 |
| 70 | May 26 | Oklahoma City | Allie P. Reynolds Stadium • Stillwater, Oklahoma | 11–1 | 57–13 | 15–3 |
| 71 | May 28 | Oklahoma City | Allie P. Reynolds Stadium • Stillwater, Oklahoma | 9–4 | 58–13 | 15–3 |

College World Series (1–2)

| # | Date | Opponent | Site/stadium | Score | Overall record | Big 8 record |
|---|---|---|---|---|---|---|
| 72 | June 2 | vs Maine | Johnny Rosenblatt Stadium • Omaha, Nebraska | 9–5 | 59–13 | 15–6 |
| 73 | June 5 | vs Arizona State | Johnny Rosenblatt Stadium • Omaha, Nebraska | 12–23 | 59–14 | 15–6 |
| 74 | June 6 | vs New Orleans | Johnny Rosenblatt Stadium • Omaha, Nebraska | 8–7 | 60–14 | 15–3 |
| 75 | June 8 | vs Texas | Johnny Rosenblatt Stadium • Omaha, Nebraska | 18–13 | 61–14 | 15–3 |
| 76 | June 9 | vs Cal State Fullerton | Johnny Rosenblatt Stadium • Omaha, Nebraska | 2–10 | 61–15 | 15–3 |

== Awards and honors ==
Grant Green

- All-Big Eight Conference
- Big Eight Conference All-Tournament Team
- Second Team All-American American Baseball Coaches Association
- Third Team All-American Baseball America
- College World Series All-Tournament Team

Pete Incaviglia

- All-Big Eight Conference
- Big Eight Conference All-Tournament Team
- First Team All-American American Baseball Coaches Association
- First Team All-American Baseball America
- College World Series All-Tournament Team

Gary Kanwisher

- Big Eight Conference All-Tournament Team

Dennis Livingston

- All-Big Eight Conference

Mike Trapasso

- Big Eight Conference All-Tournament Team

Scott Wade

- All-Big Eight Conference
- Big Eight Conference All-Tournament Team

Randy Whisler

- All-Big Eight Conference
- College World Series All-Tournament Team
