= 1984 NCAA Division I baseball season =

Baseball season

- Number of teams: 256

NCAA tournament

College World Series
- Champions: Cal State Fullerton (2nd title)
- Runners-up: Texas (21st CWS Appearance)
- Winning coach: Augie Garrido (2nd title)
- MOP: John Fishel (Cal State Fullerton)

Seasons
- ← 1983 1985 →

The 1984 NCAA Division I baseball season, play of college baseball in the United States organized by the National Collegiate Athletic Association (NCAA) began in the spring of 1984. The season progressed through the regular season and concluded with the 1984 College World Series. The College World Series, held for the thirty eighth time in 1984, consisted of one team from each of eight regional competitions and was held in Omaha, Nebraska, at Johnny Rosenblatt Stadium as a double-elimination tournament. Cal State Fullerton claimed the championship for the second time.

== Realignment and format changes ==
- Georgia State joined the Trans America Athletic Conference after playing three years as an independent. The conference re-instituted divisional play after a one-year absence, with Georgia Southern, Georgia State, Mercer, and Samford comprising the East and Arkansas–Little Rock, Centenary, Hardin–Simmons, Nicholls, and Northwestern making up the West.
- The Association of Mid-Continent Universities added baseball with seven teams. The first season did not include conference play, but did result in a tournament. The teams were Cleveland State, Eastern Illinois, Northern Iowa, Southwest Missouri State, UIC, Valparaiso, and Western Illinois.

== Conference winners ==
This is a partial list of conference champions from the 1984 season. The NCAA sponsored regional competitions to determine the College World Series participants. Six regionals of four teams and two of six each competed in double-elimination tournaments, with the winners advancing to Omaha. 25 teams earned automatic bids by winning their conference championship while 11 teams earned at-large selections.

Conference	Regular season winner	Conference tournament	Tournament venue • city	Tournament winner
Atlantic Coast Conference	North Carolina	1984 Atlantic Coast Conference baseball tournament	Durham Athletic Park • Durham, NC	North Carolina
Atlantic 10 Conference	East - Temple; West - West Virginia/Penn State	1984 Atlantic 10 Conference baseball tournament	Erny Field • Philadelphia, PA	Temple
Big Eight Conference	Oklahoma State	1984 Big Eight Conference baseball tournament	All Sports Stadium • Oklahoma City, OK	Oklahoma State
Big Ten Conference	East - Michigan; West - Minnesota	1984 Big Ten Conference baseball tournament	Siebert Field • Minneapolis, MN	Michigan
EIBL	Harvard	No tournament		
Mid-American Conference	Central Michigan	No tournament		
Mid-Continent	N/A	1984 Association of Mid-Continent Universities baseball tournament	Chicago, IL	Southwest Missouri State
Midwestern City Conference	North - Xavier; South - Oklahoma City	1984 Midwestern City Conference baseball tournament	Cincinnati, OH	Oklahoma City
Pacific-10 Conference	North - Portland State/Washington State; South - Arizona State	No tournament		
Southeastern Conference	East - Florida; West - Mississippi State	1984 Southeastern Conference baseball tournament	Perry Field • Gainesville, FL	Florida
Southern Conference	North - Appalachian State; South - Western Carolina	1984 Southern Conference baseball tournament	Hennon Stadium • Cullowhee, NC	Appalachian State
Southwest Conference	Texas	1984 Southwest Conference baseball tournament	Disch–Falk Field • Austin, TX	Texas
Trans America Athletic Conference	East - Georgia Southern; West - Nicholls State	1984 Trans America Athletic Conference baseball tournament	Centenary Park/SPAR Stadium • Shreveport, LA	Nicholls State

== Conference standings ==
The following is an incomplete list of conference standings:

1984 Atlantic Coast Conference baseball standings
	Conf.				Overall
Team	W		L	PCT	W		L	PCT
Clemson ‍†‍‍	12	–	2	.857	38	–	17	.691
No. 22 North Carolina ‍†‍‡‍^{y}	12	–	2	.857	44	–	13	.772
NC State ‍‍‍	9	–	3	.750	32	–	8	.800
Maryland ‍‍‍	6	–	7	.462	18	–	14	.563
Georgia Tech ‍‍‍	5	–	7	.417	36	–	19	.655
Virginia ‍‍‍	4	–	10	.286	25	–	17	.595
Duke ‍‍‍	3	–	8	.273	25	–	13	.658
Wake Forest ‍‍‍	1	–	13	.071	17	–	25	.405
† – Conference champion ‡ – Tournament champion y – Invited to the NCAA tournament As of June 30, 1984; Rankings from Collegiate Baseball

1984 Atlantic 10 Conference baseball standings
	Conf.						Overall
Team	W		L		T	PCT	W		L		T	PCT
East
Temple ^{x}‍‍‡‍^{y}	9	–	2	–	0	.818	33	–	14	–	0	.702
Rhode Island ‍‍‍	6	–	5	–	0	.545	22	–	18	–	0	.550
Saint Joseph's ‍‍‍	6	–	5	–	0	.545	14	–	19	–	0	.424
Rutgers ‍‍‍	4	–	7	–	0	.364	13	–	21	–	0	.382
UMass ‍‍‍	3	–	9	–	0	.250	18	–	26	–	0	.409
West
West Virginia ^{x}‍‍‍	9	–	3	–	0	.750	22	–	11	–	1	.662
Penn State ^{x}‍‍‍	9	–	3	–	0	.750	24	–	17	–	0	.585
George Washington ‍‍‍	8	–	4	–	0	.667	14	–	15	–	0	.483
Duquesne ‍‍‍	3	–	7	–	0	.300	10	–	10	–	0	.500
St. Bonaventure ‍‍‍	0	–	12	–	0	.000	6	–	19	–	1	.250
x – Division champion ‡ – Tournament champion y – Invited to the NCAA tournament As of June 30, 1984; Rankings from Collegiate Baseball

1984 Big Eight Conference baseball standings
	Conf.				Overall
Team	W		L	PCT	W		L	PCT
No. 3 Oklahoma State ‍†‍‡‍^{y}	15	–	3	.833	61	–	15	.803
No. 26 Oklahoma ‍‍‍^{y}	14	–	4	.778	42	–	15	.737
No. 29 Nebraska ‍‍‍	15	–	6	.714	46	–	20	.697
Missouri ‍‍‍	7	–	8	.467	27	–	20	.574
Iowa State ‍‍‍	6	–	12	.333	18	–	27	.400
Kansas ‍‍‍	4	–	14	.222	24	–	25	.490
Kansas State ‍‍‍	4	–	18	.182	14	–	24	.368
† – Conference champion ‡ – Tournament champion y – Invited to the NCAA tournament As of June 30, 1984; Rankings from Collegiate Baseball

1984 Big Ten Conference baseball standings
	Conf.						Overall
Team	W		L		T	PCT	W		L		T	PCT
East
Michigan ^{x}‍‍‡‍^{y}	11	–	5	–	0	.688	43	–	20	–	0	.683
Michigan State ‍‍‍	8	–	7	–	0	.533	32	–	26	–	0	.552
Ohio State ‍‍‍	8	–	8	–	0	.500	30	–	17	–	0	.638
Indiana ‍‍‍	6	–	9	–	0	.400	44	–	20	–	0	.688
Purdue ‍‍‍	6	–	10	–	0	.375	29	–	26	–	0	.527
West
Minnesota ^{x}‍‍‍	11	–	5	–	0	.688	31	–	20	–	0	.608
Northwestern ‍‍‍	9	–	6	–	1	.594	44	–	18	–	1	.706
Iowa ‍‍‍	7	–	8	–	0	.467	31	–	26	–	0	.544
Wisconsin ‍‍‍	6	–	7	–	1	.464	25	–	25	–	1	.500
Illinois ‍‍‍	3	–	10	–	0	.231	22	–	32	–	0	.407
x – Division champion ‡ – Tournament champion y – Invited to the NCAA tournament As of June 30, 1984; Rankings from Collegiate Baseball

1984 Eastern College Athletic Conference baseball standings
	Conf.						Overall
Team	W		L		PCT		W	L		PCT
No. 8 Maine ^{x}‍‍‡‍^{y}	15	–	3	–	0	.833		33	–	20	–	0	.623
Providence ‍‍‍	14	–	7	–	0	.667		25	–	19	–	2	.565
Connecticut ‍‍‍	12	–	8	–	0	.600		20	–	19	–	0	.513
Vermont ‍‍‍	7	–	7	–	0	.500		14	–	15	–	0	.483
Boston College ‍‍‍	7	–	8	–	0	.467		7	–	17	–	0	.292
New Hampshire ‍‍‍	8	–	9	–	0	.471		8	–	9	–	0	.471
Fairfield ‍‍‍	5	–	8	–	0	.385		12	–	21	–	0	.364
Northeastern ‍‍‍	4	–	11	–	0	.267		20	–	20	–	0	.500
Holy Cross ‍‍‍	2	–	16	–	0	.111		6	–	22	–	0	.214
x – Division champion ‡ – Tournament champion y – Invited to the NCAA tournament As of June 30, 1984; Rankings from Collegiate Baseball

1984 NCAA Division I baseball independents standings
	Conf.				Overall
Team	W		L	PCT	W		L	PCT
No. 27 Stetson ‍‍‍^{y}		–		–	46	–	13	.780
No. 5 Miami (FL) ‍‍‍^{y}		–		–	48	–	28	.632
Campbell ‍‍‍		–		–	24	–	15	.615
Hofstra ‍‍‍		–		–	12	–	14	.462
Villanova ‍‍‍		–		–	14	–	20	.412
Richmond ‍‍‍		–		–	14	–	22	.389
Lafayette ‍‍‍		–		–	13	–	24	.351
y – Invited to the NCAA tournament As of June 30, 1984; Rankings from Collegiate Baseball

1984 Association of Mid-Continent Universities baseball standings
	Conf.						Overall
Team	W		L		T	PCT	W		L		T	PCT
Western Illinois ‍‍‍	0	–	0	–	0	–	28	–	8	–	1	.770
Eastern Illinois ‍‍‍	0	–	0	–	0	–	19	–	11	–	0	.633
Southwest Missouri State ‍‍‡‍	0	–	0	–	0	–	35	–	22	–	0	.614
Valparaiso ‍‍‍	0	–	0	–	0	–	26	–	20	–	1	.564
Northern Iowa ‍‍‍	0	–	0	–	0	–	12	–	18	–	0	.400
UIC ‍‍‍	0	–	0	–	0	–	19	–	35	–	0	.352
Cleveland State ‍‍‍	0	–	0	–	0	–	10	–	38	–	1	.214
‡ – Tournament champion As of 1984

1984 Pacific-10 Conference baseball standings
	Conf.				Overall
Team	W		L	PCT	W		L	PCT
Northern
Washington State ^{x}‍‍‍^{y}	15	–	6	.714	41	–	20	.672
Portland State ‍‍‍	15	–	6	.714	39	–	17	.696
Eastern Washington ‍‍‍	11	–	10	.524	30	–	23	.566
Oregon State ‍‍‍	11	–	11	.500	22	–	23	.489
Portland ‍‍‍	10	–	12	.455	23	–	18	.561
Gonzaga ‍‍‍	6	–	14	.300	23	–	29	.442
Washington ‍‍‍	6	–	15	.286	16	–	27	.372
Southern
No. 3 Arizona State ^{x}‍‍‍^{y}	23	–	7	.767	55	–	20	.733
No. 24 Southern California ‍‍‍	18	–	12	.600	44	–	23	.657
No. 12 Stanford ‍‍‍	18	–	12	.600	38	–	26	.594
California ‍‍‍	12	–	18	.400	39	–	28	.582
Arizona ‍‍‍	11	–	19	.367	22	–	36	.379
UCLA ‍‍‍	8	–	22	.267	28	–	32	.467
x – Division champion y – Invited to the NCAA tournament As of June 30, 1984; Rankings from Collegiate Baseball

1984 Southeastern Conference baseball standings
	Conf.				Overall
Team	W		L	PCT	W		L	PCT
Eastern Division
No. 28 Florida ^{x}‍‍‡‍^{y}	18	–	4	.818	43	–	16	.729
Tennessee ‍‍‍	11	–	12	.478	27	–	21	.563
Vanderbilt ‍‍‍	9	–	11	.450	28	–	17	.622
Kentucky ‍‍‍	9	–	13	.409	24	–	22	.522
Georgia ‍‍‍	7	–	14	.333	25	–	23	.521
Western Division
No. 10 Mississippi State ^{x}‍‍‍^{y}	18	–	5	.783	45	–	16	.738
Alabama ‍‍‍	12	–	10	.545	35	–	18	.660
LSU ‍‍‍	12	–	12	.500	32	–	23	.582
Auburn ‍‍‍	8	–	14	.364	27	–	24	.529
Ole Miss ‍‍‍	7	–	16	.304	22	–	24	.478
x – Division champion ‡ – Tournament champion y – Invited to the NCAA tournament As of June 30, 1984; Rankings from Collegiate Baseball

1984 Southern California Baseball Association standings
	Conf.				Overall
Team	W		L	PCT	W		L	PCT
No. 1 Cal State Fullerton ‍†‍‍^{y}	22	–	6	.786	66	–	20	.767
No. 23 UNLV ‍‍‍^{y}	17	–	10	.630	42	–	24	.636
UC Santa Barbara ‍‍‍	15	–	11	.577	46	–	21	.687
Pepperdine ‍‍‍	16	–	12	.571	41	–	21	.661
Long Beach State ‍‍‍	13	–	15	.464	32	–	34	.485
UC Irvine ‍‍‍	11	–	17	.393	23	–	34	.404
Loyola Marymount ‍‍‍	10	–	18	.357	23	–	38	.377
San Diego ‍‍‍	6	–	21	.222	20	–	36	.357
† – Conference champion y – Invited to the NCAA tournament As of June 30, 1984; Rankings from Collegiate Baseball

1984 Southern Conference baseball standings
	Conf.				Overall
Team	W		L	PCT	W		L	PCT
Northern
Appalachian State ^{x}‍‍‡‍^{y}	12	–	2	.857	35	–	7	.833
VMI ‍‍‍	6	–	7	.462	16	–	18	.471
Marshall ‍‍‍	5	–	8	.385	11	–	16	.407
East Tennessee State ‍‍‍	3	–	9	.250	9	–	19	.321
Southern
Western Carolina ^{x}‍‍‍	13	–	3	.813	37	–	20	.649
The Citadel ‍‍‍	12	–	5	.706	26	–	21	.553
Davidson ‍‍‍	5	–	12	.294	12	–	16	.429
Furman ‍‍‍	4	–	14	.222	16	–	19	.457
x – Division champion ‡ – SoCon Tournament champion y – Invited to the NCAA tournament As of June 30, 1984; Rankings from Collegiate Baseball

1984 Southwest Conference baseball standings
	Conf.				Overall
Team	W		L	PCT	W		L	PCT
No. 2 Texas ‍†‍‡‍^{y}	16	–	5	.762	60	–	14	.811
Rice ‍‍‍	13	–	8	.619	41	–	14	.745
No. 19 Texas A&M ‍‍‍^{y}	13	–	8	.619	41	–	21	.661
Arkansas ‍‍‍	12	–	9	.571	40	–	16	.714
Baylor ‍‍‍	9	–	12	.429	26	–	23	.531
Texas Tech ‍‍‍	9	–	12	.429	33	–	22	.600
Houston ‍‍‍	6	–	15	.286	32	–	33	.492
TCU ‍‍‍	6	–	15	.286	25	–	22	.532
† – Conference champion ‡ – Tournament champion y – Invited to the NCAA tournament As of June 30, 1984; Rankings from Collegiate Baseball

1984 Trans America Athletic Conference baseball standings
	Conf.				Overall
Team	W		L	PCT	W		L	PCT
East
Georgia Southern ^{x}‍‍‍	13	–	4	.765	32	–	37	.464
Mercer ‍‍‍	10	–	6	.625	23	–	23	.500
Georgia State ‍‍‍	5	–	11	.313	22	–	31	.415
Samford ‍‍‍	5	–	12	.294	8	–	42	.160
West
Nicholls State ^{x}‍†‍‡‍	18	–	5	.783	38	–	21	.644
Hardin–Simmons ‍‍‍	17	–	6	.739	25	–	31	.446
Arkansas–Little Rock ‍‍‍	10	–	14	.417	20	–	30	.400
Centenary ‍‍‍	7	–	14	.333	28	–	25	.528
Northwestern State ‍‍‍	7	–	17	.292	17	–	45	.274
x – Division champion † – Conference champion ‡ – Tournament champion y – Invited to the NCAA tournament As of June 30, 1984; Rankings from Collegiate Baseball

1984 NCAA Division I baseball independents standings
	Conf.				Overall
Team	W		L	PCT	W		L	PCT
No. 27 Stetson ‍‍‍^{y}		–		–	46	–	13	.780
No. 5 Miami (FL) ‍‍‍^{y}		–		–	48	–	28	.632
Campbell ‍‍‍		–		–	24	–	15	.615
Hofstra ‍‍‍		–		–	12	–	14	.462
Villanova ‍‍‍		–		–	14	–	20	.412
Richmond ‍‍‍		–		–	14	–	22	.389
Lafayette ‍‍‍		–		–	13	–	24	.351
y – Invited to the NCAA tournament As of June 30, 1984; Rankings from Collegiate Baseball

== College World Series ==
The 1984 season marked the thirty eighth NCAA baseball tournament, which culminated with the eight team College World Series. The College World Series was held in Omaha, Nebraska. The eight teams played a double-elimination format, with Cal State Fullerton claiming their second championship with a 3–1 win over Texas in the final.

Upper round 1
Texas	6
New Orleans	3
Cal State Fullerton	8
Michigan	4
Arizona State	9
Miami (FL)	6
Oklahoma State	9
Maine	5

Upper round 2
Texas	6
Cal State Fullerton	4
Arizona State	23
Oklahoma State	12
Lower round 1
New Orleans	11
Michigan	3
Miami (FL)	13
Maine	7

Upper final
Texas	8
Arizona State	4
Lower round 2
Oklahoma State	8^{10}
New Orleans	7
Cal State Fullerton	13
Miami (FL)	5

Semifinals
Texas	3
Oklahoma State	18
Arizona State	1
Cal State Fullerton	6

Preliminary final
Oklahoma State	2
Cal State Fullerton	10

Final
Cal State Fullerton	3
Texas	1
