= 1984 Cal State Fullerton Titans baseball team =

American college baseball season

1984 Cal State Fullerton Titans baseball

College World Series champions SCBA Champions
- Conference: Southern California Baseball Association
- CB: No. 1
- Record: 66–20 (22–6 SCBA)
- Head coach: Augie Garrido (12th year)
- Assistant coaches: Chris Smith (1st year); Bill Hughes (1st year); Dave Snow (5th year)
- Home stadium: Titan Field

1984 Southern California Baseball Association standings
	Conf.				Overall
Team	W		L	PCT	W		L	PCT
No. 1 Cal State Fullerton ‍†‍‍^{y}	22	–	6	.786	66	–	20	.767
No. 23 UNLV ‍‍‍^{y}	17	–	10	.630	42	–	24	.636
UC Santa Barbara ‍‍‍	15	–	11	.577	46	–	21	.687
Pepperdine ‍‍‍	16	–	12	.571	41	–	21	.661
Long Beach State ‍‍‍	13	–	15	.464	32	–	34	.485
UC Irvine ‍‍‍	11	–	17	.393	23	–	34	.404
Loyola Marymount ‍‍‍	10	–	18	.357	23	–	38	.377
San Diego ‍‍‍	6	–	21	.222	20	–	36	.357
† – Conference champion y – Invited to the NCAA tournament As of June 30, 1984; Rankings from Collegiate Baseball

The 1984 Cal State Fullerton Titans baseball team represented California State University, Fullerton in the 1984 NCAA Division I baseball season. The Titans played their home games at Titan Field. The team was coached by Augie Garrido in his 12th season at Cal State Fullerton.

The Titans won the College World Series, defeating the Texas Longhorns in the championship game.

== Roster ==
1984 Cal State Fullerton Titans roster
Pitchers: 3 Eddie Delzer - Senior; 8 Damon Allen - Sophomore; 9 Mark Titchener - Freshman; 20 Scott Wright - Junior; 22 Steve Rousey - Junior; 23 Paul Hartwig - Sophomore; 25 Greg Mathews - Senior; 26 Jack Reinholtz - Senior; 27 Todd Simons - Junior; 36 Glen Braybrooks - Junior	Infielders: 2 Shane Turner - Junior; 4 Blaine Larker - Junior; 5 Jose Mota - Sophomore; 19 Mike Halasz - Junior; 15 Kirk Bates - Junior; 24 Dan Apodaca - Sophomore; 28 Rick Vanderhook - Senior; 31 Rich Slominski - Sophomore; 32 George Sarkissian - Senior; 33 James Jackle - Freshman; 34 Rick Campo - Junior; Catchers: 14 Bob Caffrey - Junior; 17 Ray Roman - Senior; 35 Jeff Robinson - Freshman	Outfielders: 6 Coby Oakes - Freshman; 10 Tom Thomas - Senior; 11 Jeff Farber - Junior; 12 John Fishel - Junior; 21 John Bryant - Senior; 30 Keith Watkins - Freshman; Coaches: 16 Augie Garrido - 12th Season; 1 Chris Smith - 1st Season; 7 Bill Hughes - 1st Season; 13 Dave Snow - 5th Season

== Schedule ==
1984 Cal State Fullerton Titans baseball game log
Regular season
February

Date	Opponent	Score	Overall record	SCBA record
February 3	at Stanford	5–4	1–0	–
February 4	at Stanford	1–7	1–1	–
February 5	at Stanford	7–5	2–1	–
February 7	at Cal Poly Pomona	12–3	3–1	–
February 9	Saint Mary's	7–1	4–1	–
February 10	Arizona	1–4	4–2	–
February 11	Arizona	7–8	4–3	–
February 11	Arizona	5–1	5–3	–
February 13	at Chapman	3–5	5–4	–
February 14	UCLA	2–5	5–5	–
February 16	at Arizona	4–1	6–5	–
February 17	at Arizona	15–3	7–5	–
February 18	at Arizona	13–6	8–5	–
February 21	So. California College	6–5	9–5	–
February 21	Chapman	6–10	9–6	–
February 22	at UCLA	16–1	10–6	–
February 23	Cal Poly Pomona	17–5	11–6	–
February 24	Fresno State	4–2	12–6	–
February 25	Fresno State	3–2	13–6	–
February 26	Fresno State	5–3	14–6	–
February 28	Southern California	4–3	15–6	–
February 29	UC Riverside	9–4	16–6	–

March

Date	Opponent	Score	Overall record	SCBA record
March 2	at Texas	10–2	17–6	–
March 2	at Texas	2–4	17–7	–
March 3	at Texas	3–8	17–8	–
March 5	Southern California	2–1	18–8	–
March 8	Nebraska	9–7	19–8	–
March 9	Florida State	5–3	20–8	–
March 10	Florida State	6–1	21–8	–
March 11	Florida State	4–10	21–9	–
March 13	at Pepperdine	5–2	22–9	1–0
March 14	UC Riverside	10–1	23–9	–
March 16	at Pepperdine	2–4	23–10	1–1
March 17	Pepperdine	8–5	24–10	2–1
March 17	Pepperdine	4–5	24–11	2–2
March 20	at La Verne	11–6	25–11	–
March 21	Azusa Pacific	5–2	26–11	–
March 23	at UNLV	6–4	27–11	3–2
March 23	at UNLV	6–4	28–11	4–2
March 24	at UNLV	5–7	28–12	4–3
March 24	at UNLV	4–2	29–12	5–2
March 26	at UC Riverside	2–6	29–13	–
March 27	vs. San Diego State	0–4	29–14	–
March 27	vs. Washington State	2–7	29–15	–
March 28	vs. Oregon State	14–5	30–15	–
March 29	vs. Seton Hall	7–3	31–15	–
March 30	vs. Oral Roberts	5–4	32–15	–
March 31	vs. BYU	11–4	33–15	–

April

Date	Opponent	Score	Overall record	SCBA record
April 3	at UC Santa Barbara	4–3	34–15	6–2
April 4	at Azusa Pacific	6–5	35–15	7–2
April 6	at San Diego	8–3	36–15	8–2
April 7	San Diego	13–2	37–15	9–2
April 7	San Diego	7–1	38–15	10–2
April 10	at UC Irvine	13–5	39–15	11–2
April 11	La Verne	11–2	40–15	–
April 13	Cal Poly	3–0	41–15	–
April 15	Cal Poly	18–4	42–15	–
April 20	Loyola Marymount	12–9	43–15	12–2
April 21	at Loyola Marymount	3–7	43–16	12–3
April 21	at Loyola Marymount	14–3	44–16	13–3
April 24	Long Beach State	6–1	45–16	14–3
April 25	Cal Lutheran	16–0	46–16	–
April 27	at UC Irvine	6–2	47–16	15–3
April 28	UC Irvine	3–5	47–17	15–4
April 28	UC Irvine	3–0	48–17	16–4

May

Date	Opponent	Score	Overall record	SCBA record
May 1	Loyola Marymount	6–0	49–17	17–4
May 4	Long Beach State	12–4	50–17	18–4
May 5	at Long Beach State	4–3	51–17	19–4
May 5	at Long Beach State	3–4	51–18	19–5
May 8	at San Diego	5–3	52–18	19–6
May 11	at UC Santa Barbara	14–8	53–18	20–6
May 12	UC Santa Barbara	15–13	54–18	21–6
May 12	UC Santa Barbara	6–0	55–18	22–6
May 19	UNLV	9–3	56–18	–
May 19	UNLV	7–3	57–18	–
May 20	UNLV	9–7	58–18	–

Post-season
NCAA tournament: West I Regional

Date	Opponent	Site/stadium	Score	Cal State Fullerton Decision	Attendance	Overall record
May 25	vs. Southern California	Pete Beiden Field	10–6	Simmons (W; 14–2)	–	59–18
May 26	vs. San Diego State	Pete Beiden Field	16–6	Reinholtz (W; 12–2)	1,752	60–18
May 27	vs. San Diego State	Pete Beiden Field	5–9	Mathews (L; 9-4)	1,643	60–19
May 28	vs. San Diego State	Pete Beiden Field	8–7	Wright (W; 5–1)	1,368	61–19

NCAA tournament: College World Series

Date	Opponent	Site/stadium	Score	Cal State Fullerton Decision	Attendance	Overall record
June 1	vs. Michigan	Rosenblatt Stadium	8–4	Wright (W; 6–1)	10,274	62–19
June 4	vs. Texas	Rosenblatt Stadium	4–6	Simmons (L; 14–3)	9,514	62–20
June 6	vs. Miami (FL)	Rosenblatt Stadium	13–5	Delzer (W; 7–2)	5,000	63–20
June 8	vs. Arizona State	Rosenblatt Stadium	6–1	Reinholtz (W; 13–2)	9,000	64–20
June 9	vs. Oklahoma State	Rosenblatt Stadium	10–2	Simmons (W; 15–3)	9,931	65–20
June 10	vs. Texas	Rosenblatt Stadium	3–1	Delzer (W; 8–2)	13,487	66–20

== Awards and honors ==
Kirk Bates

- All-SCBA First Team

Bob Caffrey

- All-SCBA First Team
- College World Series All-Tournament Team

Eddie Delzer

- College World Series All-Tournament Team

John Fishel

- College World Series Most Outstanding Player
- College World Series All-Tournament Team
- All-America Second Team
- All-SCBA First Team

Blaine Larker

- College World Series All-Tournament Team

Jose Mota

- All-SCBA First Team

Todd Simmons

- All-America First Team
- All-SCBA First Team

Tom Thomas

- All-SCBA First Team

Scott Wright

- All-America First Team
- SCBA Player of the Year
- All-SCBA First Team

== Titans in the 1984 MLB draft ==
The following members of the Cal State Fullerton Titans baseball program were drafted in the 1984 Major League Baseball draft.

Player	Position	Round	Overall	MLB Team
Bob Caffrey	C	1st	15th	New York Yankees
Steve Rousey	RHP	4th	82nd	Seattle Mariners
Todd Simmons	RHP	4th	106th	Chicago White Sox
Damon Allen	RHP	7th	182nd	Detroit Tigers
Greg Mathews	LHP	10th	243rd	St. Louis Cardinals
Kirk Bates	2B	11th	274th	Texas Rangers
Scott Wright	RHP	14th	361st	Philadelphia Phillies
Jack Reinholtz	LHP	17th	420th	Seattle Mariners
Tom Thomas	OF	17th	480th	Minnesota Twins
John Fishel	OF	19th	480th	Oakland Athletics
Edwin Delzer	LHP	21st	528th	California Angels
John Bryant	OF	23rd	577th	Cincinnati Reds
Ray Roman	C	28th	690th	Philadelphia Phillies
