= 1984 Atlantic 10 Conference baseball tournament =

American college baseball tournament

- Teams: 4
- Format: Double-elimination tournament
- Finals site: Erny Field; Philadelphia, PA
- Champions: Temple (2nd title)
- Winning coach: Skip Wilson (2nd title)

1984 Atlantic 10 Conference baseball standings
	Conf.						Overall
Team	W		L		T	PCT	W		L		T	PCT
East
Temple ^{x}‍‍‡‍^{y}	9	–	2	–	0	.818	33	–	14	–	0	.702
Rhode Island ‍‍‍	6	–	5	–	0	.545	22	–	18	–	0	.550
Saint Joseph's ‍‍‍	6	–	5	–	0	.545	14	–	19	–	0	.424
Rutgers ‍‍‍	4	–	7	–	0	.364	13	–	21	–	0	.382
UMass ‍‍‍	3	–	9	–	0	.250	18	–	26	–	0	.409
West
West Virginia ^{x}‍‍‍	9	–	3	–	0	.750	22	–	11	–	1	.662
Penn State ^{x}‍‍‍	9	–	3	–	0	.750	24	–	17	–	0	.585
George Washington ‍‍‍	8	–	4	–	0	.667	14	–	15	–	0	.483
Duquesne ‍‍‍	3	–	7	–	0	.300	10	–	10	–	0	.500
St. Bonaventure ‍‍‍	0	–	12	–	0	.000	6	–	19	–	1	.250
x – Division champion ‡ – Tournament champion y – Invited to the NCAA tournament As of June 30, 1984; Rankings from Collegiate Baseball

The 1984 Atlantic Conference baseball tournament was held from May 5 through 13 to determine the champion of the NCAA Division I the Atlantic 10 Conference, for the 1984 NCAA Division I baseball season. This was the sixth iteration of the event, and was held at Erny Field, home field of Temple in Philadelphia, Pennsylvania. Defending champion Temple won their second championship and earned the conference's automatic bid to the 1984 NCAA Division I baseball tournament.

== Format and seeding ==
The top two teams in each division advanced to the tournament, with each division winner playing the second place team from the opposite division in the first round. The teams played a double-elimination tournament. West Virginia claimed the top seed over Penn State and Rhode Island claimed the second seed in the East over Saint Joseph's by tiebreaker.

Team	W	L	Pct	GB	Seed
East Division
Temple	9	2	.818	—	1E
Rhode Island	6	5	.545	3	2E
Saint Joseph's	6	5	.545	3	—
Rutgers	4	7	.364	5	—
UMass	3	9	.250	6.5	—

Team	W	L	Pct	GB	Seed
Western Division
West Virginia	9	3	.750	—	1W
Penn State	9	3	.750	—	2W
George Washington	8	4	.667	1	—
Duquesne	3	7	.300	5	—
St. Bonaventure	0	12	.000	9	—

== Results ==
First round
1E	Temple	2
2W	Penn State	5^{13}
1W	West Virginia	3
2E	Rhode Island	15
Lower round 1
1E	Temple	3
1W	West Virginia	2

Semi-finals
2W	Penn State	6
2E	Rhode Island	7^{10}
Lower final
2W	Penn State	5
1E	Temple	13

Finals
2E	Rhode Island	3	4
1E	Temple	6	6
