= 1984 Trans America Athletic Conference baseball tournament =

American college baseball tournament

- Teams: 4
- Format: Double-elimination
- Finals site: Centenary Park; Shreveport, Louisiana
- Champions: Nicholls State (1st title)
- Winning coach: Mike Knight (1st title)

1984 Trans America Athletic Conference baseball standings
	Conf.				Overall
Team	W		L	PCT	W		L	PCT
East
Georgia Southern ^{x}‍‍‍	13	–	4	.765	32	–	37	.464
Mercer ‍‍‍	10	–	6	.625	23	–	23	.500
Georgia State ‍‍‍	5	–	11	.313	22	–	31	.415
Samford ‍‍‍	5	–	12	.294	8	–	42	.160
West
Nicholls State ^{x}‍†‍‡‍	18	–	5	.783	38	–	21	.644
Hardin–Simmons ‍‍‍	17	–	6	.739	25	–	31	.446
Arkansas–Little Rock ‍‍‍	10	–	14	.417	20	–	30	.400
Centenary ‍‍‍	7	–	14	.333	28	–	25	.528
Northwestern State ‍‍‍	7	–	17	.292	17	–	45	.274
x – Division champion † – Conference champion ‡ – Tournament champion y – Invited to the NCAA tournament As of June 30, 1984; Rankings from Collegiate Baseball

The 1984 Trans America Athletic Conference baseball tournament was held at Centenary Park on the campus of Centenary College of Louisiana in Shreveport, Louisiana, from May 13 through 15. This was the sixth tournament championship held by the Trans America Athletic Conference, in its sixth year of existence. Nicholls State won their first tournament championship.

== Format and seeding ==
At the end of the conference regular season, the top two finishers in each division advanced to the tournament with each division winner playing the runner up from the opposite division in the first round of the double-elimination tournament.

Team	W	L	Pct.	GB	Seed
East
Georgia Southern	13	4	.765	—	1E
Mercer	10	6	.625	2.5	2E
Georgia State	5	11	.313	7.5	—
Samford	5	12	.294	8	—

Team	W	L	Pct.	GB	Seed
West
Nicholls State	18	5	.783	—	1W
Hardin–Simmons	17	6	.739	1	2W
Arkansas–Little Rock	10	14	.417	8.5	—
Centenary	7	14	.333	10	—
Northwestern State	7	17	.292	11.5	—

== Bracket ==
First round
1E	Georgia Southern	4^{10}
2W	Hardin–Simmons	3
1W	Nicholls State	18
2E	Mercer	1
Lower round 1
2W	Hardin–Simmons	6
2E	Mercer	8^{12}

Semi-finals
1E	Georgia Southern	3
1W	Nicholls State	6
Lower final
1E	Georgia Southern	14
2E	Mercer	4

Finals
1W	Nicholls State	16	—
1E	Georgia Southern	4	—

== All-Tournament Team ==
The following players were named to the All-Tournament Team. No MVP was named until 1985.

POS	Player	School
P	Stan Fabre	Nicholls State
P	John Faciane	Nicholls State
C	Greg McMullen	Georgia Southern
1B	Matt Bergeron	Nicholls State
2B	Jeff Petzoldt	Georgia Southern
SS	Bobby Dickerson	Nicholls State
3B	Tracy Thomas	Hardin–Simmons
OF	Darryl Hamilton	Nicholls State
OF	Ben Abner	Georgia Southern
OF	Mike Tullier	Nicholls State
DH	Pat Chasco	Nicholls State
