= 1984 Southeastern Conference baseball tournament =

- Teams: 4
- Format: Four-team double elimination tournament
- Finals site: Perry Field; Gainesville, Florida
- Champions: Florida (3rd title)
- Winning coach: Joe Arnold (1st title)
- MVP: Alan Cockrell (Tennessee)

1984 Southeastern Conference baseball standings
	Conf.				Overall
Team	W		L	PCT	W		L	PCT
Eastern Division
No. 28 Florida ^{x}‍‍‡‍^{y}	18	–	4	.818	43	–	16	.729
Tennessee ‍‍‍	11	–	12	.478	27	–	21	.563
Vanderbilt ‍‍‍	9	–	11	.450	28	–	17	.622
Kentucky ‍‍‍	9	–	13	.409	24	–	22	.522
Georgia ‍‍‍	7	–	14	.333	25	–	23	.521
Western Division
No. 10 Mississippi State ^{x}‍‍‍^{y}	18	–	5	.783	45	–	16	.738
Alabama ‍‍‍	12	–	10	.545	35	–	18	.660
LSU ‍‍‍	12	–	12	.500	32	–	23	.582
Auburn ‍‍‍	8	–	14	.364	27	–	24	.529
Ole Miss ‍‍‍	7	–	16	.304	22	–	24	.478
x – Division champion ‡ – Tournament champion y – Invited to the NCAA tournament As of June 30, 1984; Rankings from Collegiate Baseball

The 1984 Southeastern Conference baseball tournament was held at Perry Field in Gainesville, Florida, from May 11 through 14. Florida won the tournament and earned the Southeastern Conference's automatic bid to the 1984 NCAA tournament.

== Regular season results ==
Team	W	L	Pct	GB	Seed
Eastern Division
Florida	18	4	.818		1
Tennessee	11	12	.478	7.5	4
Vanderbilt	9	11	.450	8	—
Kentucky	9	13	.409	9	—
Georgia	7	14	.333	10.5	—

Team	W	L	Pct	GB	Seed
Western Division
Mississippi State	18	5	.783	—	2
Alabama	12	10	.545	5.5	3
LSU	12	12	.500	6.5	—
Auburn	8	14	.364	9.5	—
Ole Miss	7	16	.304	11	—

== Tournament ==
First round
4	Tennessee	13
2	Mississippi State	11
3	Alabama	3
1	Florida	5
Lower round 1
2	Mississippi State	8
3	Alabama	4

Semi-finals
4	Tennessee	2
1	Florida	10
Lower final
2	Mississippi State	3
4	Tennessee	8

Finals
1	Florida	2	3
4	Tennessee	3	1

- LSU, Ole Miss, Auburn, Georgia, Kentucky and Vanderbilt did not make the tournament.

== All-Tournament Team ==
Position	Player	School
1B	Mike Pitisci	Alabama
2B	Bruce Crabbe	Florida
3B	Mike Stanley	Florida
SS	Bob Parker	Mississippi State
C	Frank Vellaggia	Alabama
OF	Scott Ruskin	Florida
OF	Tom Stamps	Tennessee
OF	Dee Smithey	Alabama
UT	Ted McClendon	Alabama
P	Clay Daniel	Florida
P	Jeff Fischer	Florida
DH	Bobby Thigpen	Mississippi State
MVP	Alan Cockrell	Tennessee

== See also ==
- College World Series
- NCAA Division I Baseball Championship
- Southeastern Conference baseball tournament
