= 1984 Big Ten baseball tournament =

1984 Big Ten Conference baseball tournament
- Teams: 4
- Format: Double-elimination
- Finals site: Siebert Field; Minneapolis, MN
- Champions: Michigan (3rd title)
- Winning coach: Bud Middaugh (3rd title)
- MVP: Kurt Zimmerman (Michigan)

1984 Big Ten Conference baseball standings
	Conf.						Overall
Team	W		L		T	PCT	W		L		T	PCT
East
Michigan ^{x}‍‍‡‍^{y}	11	–	5	–	0	.688	43	–	20	–	0	.683
Michigan State ‍‍‍	8	–	7	–	0	.533	32	–	26	–	0	.552
Ohio State ‍‍‍	8	–	8	–	0	.500	30	–	17	–	0	.638
Indiana ‍‍‍	6	–	9	–	0	.400	44	–	20	–	0	.688
Purdue ‍‍‍	6	–	10	–	0	.375	29	–	26	–	0	.527
West
Minnesota ^{x}‍‍‍	11	–	5	–	0	.688	31	–	20	–	0	.608
Northwestern ‍‍‍	9	–	6	–	1	.594	44	–	18	–	1	.706
Iowa ‍‍‍	7	–	8	–	0	.467	31	–	26	–	0	.544
Wisconsin ‍‍‍	6	–	7	–	1	.464	25	–	25	–	1	.500
Illinois ‍‍‍	3	–	10	–	0	.231	22	–	32	–	0	.407
x – Division champion ‡ – Tournament champion y – Invited to the NCAA tournament As of June 30, 1984; Rankings from Collegiate Baseball

The 1984 Big Ten Conference baseball tournament was held at Siebert Field on the campus of the University of Minnesota in Minneapolis, Minnesota, from May 18 through 20. The top two teams from the regular season in each division participated in the double-elimination tournament, the fourth annual tournament sponsored by the Big Ten Conference to determine the league champion. Michigan won their third tournament championship and earned the Big Ten Conference's automatic bid to the 1984 NCAA Division I baseball tournament

== Format and seeding ==
The 1984 tournament was a 4-team double-elimination tournament, with seeds determined by conference regular season winning percentage within each division. The top seed from each division played the second seed from the opposite division in the first round.

Team	W	L	PCT	GB	Seed
East Division
Michigan	11	5	.688	–	1E
Michigan State	8	7	.533	2.5	2E
Ohio State	8	8	.500	3	–
Indiana	6	9	.400	4.5	–
Purdue	6	10	.375	5	–
West Division
Minnesota	11	5	.688	–	1W
Northwestern	9	6	.600	1.5	2W
Iowa	7	8	.467	3.5	–
Wisconsin	6	7	.464	3	–
Illinois	3	10	.231	6.5	–

== Tournament ==
Upper round 1
1E	Michigan	13
2W	Northwestern	1
1W	Minnesota	8
2E	Michigan State	7
Lower round 1
2W	Northwestern	9
2E	Michigan State	4

Upper final
1E	Michigan	6
1W	Minnesota	3
Lower final
1W	Minnesota	2
2W	Northwestern	10

Final
1E	Michigan	2	8
2W	Northwestern	6	3

== All-Tournament Team ==
The following players were named to the All-Tournament Team.

Pos	Name	School
P	Scott Kamieniecki	Michigan
P	John Trautwein	Northwestern
C	Rich Blair	Michigan
1B	Ken Hayward	Michigan
1B	Mike Eddington	Michigan State
2B	Tom Hildebrand	Northwestern
SS	Barry Larkin	Michigan
3B	John Stewart	Northwestern
OF	Jeff Minick	Michigan
OF	Kurt Zimmerman	Michigan
OF	Mike Whitman	Michigan State
DH	Ed Tompa	Northwestern
DH	Tim McIntosh	Minnesota

=== Most Outstanding Player ===
Kurt Zimmerman was named Most Outstanding Player. Zimmerman was an outfielder for Michigan.
