= 1984 Maine Black Bears baseball team =

1984 Maine Black Bears baseball

ECAC New England baseball tournament champion NCAA Northeast Regional champion

College World Series, 0–2
- Conference: Eastern College Athletic Conference
- Record: 33–20 (15–3 ECAC)
- Head coach: John Winkin (10th season)

1984 Eastern College Athletic Conference baseball standings
	Conf.						Overall
Team	W		L		T	PCT	W		L		T	PCT
No. 8 Maine ^{x}‍‍‡‍^{y}	15	–	3	–	0	.833	33	–	20	–	0	.623
Providence ‍‍‍	14	–	7	–	0	.667	25	–	19	–	2	.565
Connecticut ‍‍‍	12	–	8	–	0	.600	20	–	19	–	0	.513
Vermont ‍‍‍	7	–	7	–	0	.500	14	–	15	–	0	.483
Boston College ‍‍‍	7	–	8	–	0	.467	7	–	17	–	0	.292
New Hampshire ‍‍‍	8	–	9	–	0	.471	8	–	9	–	0	.471
Fairfield ‍‍‍	5	–	8	–	0	.385	12	–	21	–	0	.364
Northeastern ‍‍‍	4	–	11	–	0	.267	20	–	20	–	0	.500
Holy Cross ‍‍‍	2	–	16	–	0	.111	6	–	22	–	0	.214
x – Division champion ‡ – Tournament champion y – Invited to the NCAA tournament As of June 30, 1984; Rankings from Collegiate Baseball

The 1984 Maine Black Bears baseball team represented the University of Maine in the 1984 NCAA Division I baseball season. The Black Bears were led by John Winkin in his 10th year as head coach, and played as a members of the Eastern College Athletic Conference.

Maine posted a 33–20 record and 15–3 in ECAC, and won the Eastern College Athletic Conference New England Tournament to claim the automatic bid to the 1984 NCAA Division I baseball tournament. They won the Northeast Regional to advance to the 1984 College World Series, their sixth (and fourth consecutive) appearance in Omaha. The Black Bears finished tied for seventh after losses to eventual semifinalists Oklahoma State and Miami (FL).

== Personnel ==
=== Roster ===
1984 Maine Black Bears baseball roster
Pitchers: 1 - Marc Powers - Freshman; 4 - Tom Darsney - Freshman; 8 - Bill Swift - Senior; 11 - Scott Morse - Freshman; 14 - Ernie Webster - Junior; 16 - Stuart Lacognata - Senior; 17 - John Kowalski - Junior; 22 - Bill McInnis - Sophomore; 22 - Robert Wilkins - Junior; 24 - Steve Loubier - Freshman; 27 - Robert Colford - Senior; 30 - Michael Ballou - Sophomore; 31 - Dan Phillipon - Freshman	Catchers: 12 - Peter Bushway - Senior; 25 - Edward Hackett - Senior; Outfielders: 10 - Rob Roy - Junior; 15 - Dan Kane - Freshman; 20 - David Gonyar - Sophomore; 29 - Rick Lashua - Senior	Infielders: 3 - Mike Bordick - Freshman; 7 - Rick Bernardo - Sophomore; 9 - Jeff Paul - Senior; 18 - Tim Layman - Senior; 19 - Dan Etzweiler - Freshman; 21 - Bill Reynolds - Sophomore; 26 - Mike Rutherford - Freshman; 28 - Tony Bellagamba - Freshman

==== Coaches ====
1984 Maine Black Bears baseball coaching staff
- 5 - John Winkin - Head coach - 10th season
- 2 - Bob Whalen - Assistant coach - 3rd season

== Schedule ==
1984 Maine Black Bears baseball game log
Regular season

March
Date	Opponent	Site/stadium	Score	Overall record	ECAC record
Mar 9	at Texas*	Disch–Falk Field • Austin, TX	L 6–26	0–1	
Mar 10	at Texas*	Disch–Falk Field • Austin, TX	L 6–7	0–2	
Mar 10	at Texas*	Disch–Falk Field • Austin, TX	L 1–6	0–3	
Mar 11	vs Oklahoma*	Edinburg, TX (Citrus Tournament)	W 4–3	1–3	
Mar 12	vs Kansas*	Edinburg, TX (Citrus Tournament)	L 4–5	1–4	
Mar 13	vs Oklahoma*	Edinburg, TX (Citrus Tournament)	L 2–4	1–5	
Mar 13	at Texas–Pan American*	Edinburg, TX (Citrus Tournament)	L 4–12	1–6	
	vs Central Michigan*	Edinburg, TX (Citrus Tournament)	L 2–8	1–7	
Mar 16	vs Kansas*	Edinburg, TX (Citrus Tournament)	L 6–8	1–8	
	vs Central Michigan*	Edinburg, TX (Citrus Tournament)	L 13–15	1–9	
Mar 17	vs Oklahoma*	Edinburg, TX (Citrus Tournament)	W 6–2	2–9	
Mar 17	at Texas–Pan American*	Edinburg, TX (Citrus Tournament)	L 5–8	2–10	
Mar 18	vs Miami (OH)*	Edinburg, TX (Citrus Tournament)	L 5–7	2–11	
Mar 20	vs Bradley*	Edinburg, TX (Jody Ramsey Tournament)	W 9–4	3–11	
Mar 20	at Texas–Pan American*	Edinburg, TX (Jody Ramsey Tournament)	W 9–1	4–11	
Mar 21	vs Miami (OH)*	Edinburg, TX (Jody Ramsey Tournament)	L 5–10	4–12	
Mar 21	vs Bradley*	Edinburg, TX (Jody Ramsey Tournament)	W 11–10	5–12	
Mar 22	vs Michigan*	Edinburg, TX (Jody Ramsey Tournament)	W 10–9	6–12	
Mar 23	vs Michigan*	Edinburg, TX (Jody Ramsey Tournament)	W 6–3	7–12	
Mar 23	at Texas–Pan American*	Edinburg, TX (Jody Ramsey Tournament)	L 3–4	7–13	
Mar 24	vs Miami (OH)*	Edinburg, TX (Jody Ramsey Tournament)	W 9–6	8–13	

April/May
Date	Opponent	Site/stadium	Score	Overall record	ECAC record
Apr 7	at Connecticut	J. O. Christian Field • Storrs, CT	L 0–1	8–14	0–1
Apr 7	at Connecticut	J. O. Christian Field • Storrs, CT	W 5–4	9–14	1–1
Apr 8	at Connecticut	J. O. Christian Field • Storrs, CT	W 2–1	10–14	2–1
Apr 8	at Connecticut	J. O. Christian Field • Storrs, CT	L 0–8	10–15	2–2
	at Northeastern	Parsons Field • Brookline, MA	W 13–1	11–15	3–2
	at Northeastern	Parsons Field • Brookline, MA	W 8–0	12–15	4–2
	at Holy Cross	Fitton Field • Worcester, MA	W 8–1	13–15	5–2
	at Holy Cross	Fitton Field • Worcester, MA	W 10–0	14–15	6–2
Apr 14	UMass*	Mahaney Diamond • Orono, ME	W 6–1	15–15	
Apr 14	UMass*	Mahaney Diamond • Orono, ME	L 3–15	15–16	
Apr 18	Colby*	Mahaney Diamond • Orono, ME	W 7–1	16–16	
	Providence	Mahaney Diamond • Orono, ME	W 4–0	17–16	7–2
	Providence	Mahaney Diamond • Orono, ME	W 20–2	18–16	8–2
	Vermont	Mahaney Diamond • Orono, ME	L 4–12	18–17	8–3
	St. Joseph's (ME)*	Mahaney Diamond • Orono, ME	W 14–1	19–17	
	at Boston College	Shea Field • Chestnut Hill, MA	W 5–0	20–17	9–3
	at Boston College	Shea Field • Chestnut Hill, MA	W 8–6	21–17	10–3
	New Hampshire	Mahaney Diamond • Orono, ME	W 11–5	22–17	11–3
	New Hampshire	Mahaney Diamond • Orono, ME	W 7–6	23–17	12–3
	Bowdoin*	Mahaney Diamond • Orono, ME	W 12–6	24–17	
May 3	at Husson*	Portland, ME	W 5–3	25–17	
May 6	Miami (FL)*	Mahaney Diamond • Orono, ME	W 3–1	26–17	
May 6	Miami (FL)*	Mahaney Diamond • Orono, ME	W 5–0	27–17	

Postseason

ECAC New England baseball tournament
Date	Opponent	Site/stadium	Score	Overall record	ECACT record
	New Hampshire	McCoy Stadium • Pawtucket, RI	W 7–3	28–17	1–0
	Providence	McCoy Stadium • Pawtucket, RI	W 7–1	29–17	2–0
May 20	Connecticut	McCoy Stadium • Pawtucket, RI	W 12–1	30–17	3–0

NCAA Northeast Regional
Date	Opponent	Site/stadium	Score	Overall record	NCAAT record
May 25	Rider	Mahaney Diamond • Orono, ME	W 12–6	31–17	1–0
May 26	Harvard	Mahaney Diamond • Orono, ME	W 5–4	32–17	2–0
May 27	Seton Hall	Mahaney Diamond • Orono, ME	L 2–3	32–18	2–1
May 28	Seton Hall	Mahaney Diamond • Orono, ME	W 5–2	33–18	3–1

College World Series
Date	Opponent	Site/stadium	Score	Overall record	CWS record
June 2	Oklahoma State	Johnny Rosenblatt Stadium • Omaha, NE	L 5–9	33–19	0–1
June 3	Miami (FL)	Johnny Rosenblatt Stadium • Omaha, NE	L 7–13	33–20	0–2
