= 1984 Michigan Wolverines baseball team =

American college baseball season

1984 Michigan Wolverines baseball

Big Ten Conference East Division Big Ten Conference Tournament

College World Series, T-7th
- Conference: Big Ten Conference
- East
- CB: No. 7
- Record: 43–20 (11–5 Big Ten)
- Head coach: Bud Middaugh (5th season)
- Assistant coach: Danny Hall (5th season)
- MVP: Ken Hayward
- Home stadium: Ray Fisher Stadium

1984 Big Ten Conference baseball standings
	Conf.						Overall
Team	W		L		T	PCT	W		L		T	PCT
East
Michigan ^{x}‍‍‡‍^{y}	11	–	5	–	0	.688	43	–	20	–	0	.683
Michigan State ‍‍‍	8	–	7	–	0	.533	32	–	26	–	0	.552
Ohio State ‍‍‍	8	–	8	–	0	.500	30	–	17	–	0	.638
Indiana ‍‍‍	6	–	9	–	0	.400	44	–	20	–	0	.688
Purdue ‍‍‍	6	–	10	–	0	.375	29	–	26	–	0	.527
West
Minnesota ^{x}‍‍‍	11	–	5	–	0	.688	31	–	20	–	0	.608
Northwestern ‍‍‍	9	–	6	–	1	.594	44	–	18	–	1	.706
Iowa ‍‍‍	7	–	8	–	0	.467	31	–	26	–	0	.544
Wisconsin ‍‍‍	6	–	7	–	1	.464	25	–	25	–	1	.500
Illinois ‍‍‍	3	–	10	–	0	.231	22	–	32	–	0	.407
x – Division champion ‡ – Tournament champion y – Invited to the NCAA tournament As of June 30, 1984; Rankings from Collegiate Baseball

The 1984 Michigan Wolverines baseball team represented the University of Michigan in the 1984 NCAA Division I baseball season. The head coach was Bud Middaugh, serving his 5th year. The Wolverines finished the season in 7th place in the 1984 College World Series.

== Roster ==
1984 Michigan Wolverines baseball team
Players
Coaches

#	Pos.	Name	B/T	Height	Weight	Year	Home town
15	C	Rich Bair	/	—	—	Sr
6	INF	C. J. Beshke	/	—	—
		Edgar Best	/	—	—
		Mike Betz	/	—	—
34	OF	Casey Close	R/R	6 ft 1 in (1.85 m)	185 lb (84 kg)	So	Columbus, Ohio
		John Codere	/	—	—	Fr
		Mark Dadabbo	/	—	—
	OF	Dan Disher	R/R	6 ft 2 in (1.88 m)	190 lb (86 kg)	So
3		Buddy Dodge	/	—	—	Fr
8		Chuck Froning	/	—	—	Sr
33		John Grettenberger	/	—	—	Fr
21		Chris Gust	/	—	—	So
32	INF	Ken Hayward	/	—	—	Jr
7		Rob Huffman	/	—	—
19	RHP	Scott Kamieniecki	R/R	6 ft 0 in (1.83 m)	195 lb (88 kg)	So	Mount Clemens, Michigan
14	LHP	Dave Karasinski	L/L	5 ft 11 in (1.8 m)	190 lb (86 kg)		Detroit, Michigan
		Paul Kasper	/	—	—
		Derek Kerr	/	—	—	So
16	INF	Barry Larkin	R/R	6 ft 0 in (1.83 m)	185 lb (84 kg)	So	Cincinnati, Ohio
22	OF	Jeffery Minick	/	—	—	Jr
23	INF	Hal Morris	L/L	6 ft 3 in (1.91 m)	200 lb (91 kg)	Fr	Fort Rucker, Alabama
10		Eric Sanders	/	—	—	So
18	P	Bill Shuta	/	—	—	Sr
		Matthew Siuda	/	—	—
4	INF	Michael Watters	L/R	6 ft 1 in (1.85 m)	185 lb (84 kg)
24	LHP	Gary Wayne	L/L	6 ft 3 in (1.91 m)	185 lb (84 kg)	Sr	Dearborn, Michigan
20		Paul Wenson	/	—	—
		Jerry Wolf	/	—	—
25	C	Randy Wolfe	/	6 ft 0 in (1.83 m)	—
12		Jon Wood	/	—	—
31	OF	Kurt Zimmerman	/	—	—	So

Head coach

27 Bud Middaugh

Assistant coach(es)

17 Danny Hall
36 Gary Murphy
John Young

Legend

- (C) Team captain
- (S) Suspended
- (I) Ineligible
- Injured
- Current redshirt

== Schedule ==
1984 Michigan Wolverines baseball game log
Regular season
March (8–8)

#	Date	Opponent	Site/stadium	Score	Overall record	Big Ten record
1	March 16	vs Central Michigan	Unknown • Edinburg, Texas	8–9	0–1	0–0
2	March 17	vs Bradley	Unknown • Edinburg, Texas	7–6	1–1	0–0
3	March 19	vs Bradley	Unknown • Edinburg, Texas	9–10	1–2	0–0
4	March 20	vs Bradley	Unknown • Edinburg, Texas	5–3	2–2	0–0
5	March 21	at Texas–Pan American	Unknown • Edinburg, Texas	8–12	2–3	0–0
6	March 22	vs Maine	Unknown • Edinburg, Texas	9–10	2–4	0–0
7	March 22	vs Miami (OH)	Unknown • Edinburg, Texas	2–13	2–5	0–0
8	March 23	vs Miami (OH)	Unknown • Edinburg, Texas	2–11	2–6	0–0
9	March 23	vs Maine	Unknown • Edinburg, Texas	3–6	2–7	0–0
10	March 24	at Texas–Pan American	Unknown • Edinburg, Texas	4–2	3–7	0–0
11	March 27	vs Grand Valley State	Unknown • Unknown, Michigan	6–1	4–7	0–0
12	March 27	vs Grand Valley State	Unknown • Unknown, Michigan	4–3	5–7	0–0
13	March 30	at Miami (OH)	Unknown • Oxford, Ohio	1–2	5–8	0–0
14	March 30	at Miami (OH)	Unknown • Oxford, Ohio	5–2	6–8	0–0
15	March 31	at Miami (OH)	Unknown • Oxford, Ohio	9–3	7–8	0–0
16	March 31	at Miami (OH)	Unknown • Oxford, Ohio	11–7	8–8	0–0

April (19–3)

#	Date	Opponent	Site/stadium	Score	Overall record	Big Ten record
17	April 1	at Bowling Green	Steller Field • Bowling Green, Ohio	6–3	9–8	0–0
18	April 1	at Bowling Green	Steller Field • Bowling Green, Ohio	4–0	10–8	0–0
19	April 4	vs Western Michigan	Unknown • Unknown, Michigan	7–1	11–8	0–0
20	April 4	vs Western Michigan	Unknown • Unknown, Michigan	5–1	12–8	0–0
21	April 7	vs Detroit	Unknown • Unknown, Michigan	2–1	13–8	0–0
22	April 7	vs Detroit	Unknown • Unknown, Michigan	7–2	14–8	0–0
23	April 8	vs Eastern Michigan	Unknown • Unknown, Michigan	2–3	14–9	0–0
24	April 8	vs Eastern Michigan	Unknown • Unknown, Michigan	9–8	15–9	0–0
25	April 10	vs Wayne State	Unknown • Unknown, Michigan	19–9	16–9	0–0
26	April 11	Siena Heights	Ray Fisher Stadium • Ann Arbor, Michigan	5–4	17–9	0–0
27	April 11	Siena Heights	Ray Fisher Stadium • Ann Arbor, Michigan	9–3	18–9	0–0
28	April 14	at Indiana	Sembower Field • Bloomington, Indiana	16–10	19–9	1–0
29	April 14	at Indiana	Sembower Field • Bloomington, Indiana	0–16	19–10	1–1
30	April 15	at Indiana	Sembower Field • Bloomington, Indiana	4–1	20–10	2–1
31	April 15	at Indiana	Sembower Field • Bloomington, Indiana	3–2	21–10	3–1
32	April 19	vs Cleveland State	Unknown • Unknown	7–3	22–10	3–1
33	April 19	vs Cleveland State	Unknown • Unknown	13–3	23–10	3–1
34	April 19	vs Cleveland State	Unknown • Unknown	10–6	24–10	3–1
35	April 28	Ohio State	Ray Fisher Stadium • Ann Arbor, Michigan	3–2	25–10	4–1
36	April 28	Ohio State	Ray Fisher Stadium • Ann Arbor, Michigan	2–0	26–10	5–1
37	April 29	Ohio State	Ray Fisher Stadium • Ann Arbor, Michigan	3–1	27–10	6–1
38	April 29	Ohio State	Ray Fisher Stadium • Ann Arbor, Michigan	4–8	27–11	6–2

May (10–6)

#	Date	Opponent	Site/stadium	Score	Overall record	Big Ten record
39	May 1	Adrian	Ray Fisher Stadium • Ann Arbor, Michigan	9–0	28–11	6–2
40	May 1	Adrian	Ray Fisher Stadium • Ann Arbor, Michigan	12–1	29–11	6–2
41	May 2	Toledo	Ray Fisher Stadium • Ann Arbor, Michigan	4–5	29–12	6–2
42	May 2	Toledo	Ray Fisher Stadium • Ann Arbor, Michigan	8–7	30–12	6–2
43	May 5	Michigan State	Ray Fisher Stadium • Ann Arbor, Michigan	2–1	31–12	7–2
44	May 5	Michigan State	Ray Fisher Stadium • Ann Arbor, Michigan	2–7	31–13	7–3
45	May 6	at Michigan State	John H. Kobs Field • East Lansing, Michigan	11–7	32–13	8–3
46	May 6	at Michigan State	John H. Kobs Field • East Lansing, Michigan	5–14	32–14	8–4
47	May 8	vs Wayne State	Unknown • Unknown, Michigan	0–5	32–15	8–4
48	May 8	vs Wayne State	Unknown • Unknown, Michigan	11–6	33–15	8–4
49	May 9	vs Eastern Michigan	Unknown • Unknown, Michigan	8–6	34–15	8–4
50	May 9	vs Eastern Michigan	Unknown • Unknown, Michigan	7–8	34–16	8–4
51	May 12	at Purdue	Lambert Field • West Lafayette, Indiana	11–3	35–16	9–4
52	May 12	at Purdue	Lambert Field • West Lafayette, Indiana	4–2	36–16	10–4
53	May 13	at Purdue	Lambert Field • West Lafayette, Indiana	15–2	37–16	11–4
54	May 13	at Purdue	Lambert Field • West Lafayette, Indiana	7–11	37–17	11–5

Postseason
Big Ten Tournament (3–1)

#	Date	Opponent	Site/stadium	Score	Overall record	Big Ten record
55	May 18	vs Northwestern	Siebert Field • Minneapolis, Minnesota	13–1	38–17	11–5
56	May 19	vs Minnesota	Siebert Field • Minneapolis, Minnesota	6–3	39–17	11–5
57	May 20	vs Northwestern	Siebert Field • Minneapolis, Minnesota	2–6	39–18	11–5
58	May 20	vs Northwestern	Siebert Field • Minneapolis, Minnesota	8–3	40–18	11–5

Mideast Regional (3–0)

#	Date	Opponent	Site/stadium	Score	Overall record	Big Ten record
59	May 26	vs Temple	Theunissen Stadium • Mount Pleasant, Michigan	13–9	41–18	11–5
60	May 27	vs Indiana State	Theunissen Stadium • Mount Pleasant, Michigan	8–2	42–18	11–5
61	May 30	vs Central Michigan	Theunissen Stadium • Mount Pleasant, Michigan	4–3	43–18	11–5

1984 College World Series (0–2)

#	Date	Opponent	Site/stadium	Score	Overall record	Big Ten record
62	June 1	vs Cal State Fullerton	Johnny Rosenblatt Stadium • Omaha, Nebraska	4–8	43–19	11–5
63	June 3	vs New Orleans	Johnny Rosenblatt Stadium • Omaha, Nebraska	3–11	43–20	11–5

== Awards and honors ==
Ken Hayward

- First Team All-Big Ten

Scott Kamieniecki

- First Team All-Big Ten

Barry Larkin

- American Baseball Coaches Association First Team All-American
- Big Ten Player of the Year
- First Team All-Big Ten
