= 1984 Miami Hurricanes baseball team =

American college baseball season

1984 Miami Hurricanes baseball

NCAA South I Regional champions

College World Series, 1–2
- Conference: Independent
- Record: 48–28
- Head coach: Ron Fraser (22nd year)
- Home stadium: Mark Light Field

1984 NCAA Division I baseball independents standings
	Conf.				Overall
Team	W		L	PCT	W		L	PCT
No. 27 Stetson ‍‍‍^{y}		–		–	46	–	13	.780
No. 5 Miami (FL) ‍‍‍^{y}		–		–	48	–	28	.632
Campbell ‍‍‍		–		–	24	–	15	.615
Hofstra ‍‍‍		–		–	12	–	14	.462
Villanova ‍‍‍		–		–	14	–	20	.412
Richmond ‍‍‍		–		–	14	–	22	.389
Lafayette ‍‍‍		–		–	13	–	24	.351
y – Invited to the NCAA tournament As of June 30, 1984; Rankings from Collegiate Baseball

The 1984 Miami Hurricanes baseball team represented the University of Miami in the 1984 NCAA Division I baseball season. The Hurricanes played their home games at Mark Light Field. The team was coached by Ron Fraser in his 22nd season at Miami.

The Hurricanes reached the College World Series, where they were eliminated after recording a win against Maine and losses to eventual fourth-place Arizona State and champion Cal State Fullerton.

== Personnel ==
=== Roster ===
1984 Miami Hurricanes roster
Pitchers: Dan Davies; Steffen Majer; Alain Patenaude; 22 Kevin Sheary; Rob Souza; Catchers: 10 Chris Magno	Infielders: Chris Hart; Bruce Roberts; Jon Leake; Don Rowland; Rusty DeBold; Outfielders: 12 Mike Fiore; Calvin James; Doug Shields	Unknown: Lazaro Collazo; Frank Dominguez; 39 Greg Ellena; Steve Fauci; Rick Kosek; Mark Malizia; Willie Martinez; Gus Meizoso; Joe Nelson; Jon Noce; Bob O'Brien; Bill Phillips; Joe Raedle; Rick Richardi; Kevin Ryan; Chris Sarmiento; Julio Solis

=== Coaches ===
1984 Miami Hurricanes baseball coaching staff
- Ron Fraser – Head coach – 22nd year

== Schedule and results ==
Legend
Miami win
Miami loss

1984 Miami Hurricanes baseball game log
Regular season

February
Date	Opponent	Site/stadium	Score	Overall record
Feb 3	Florida	Mark Light Field • Coral Gables, FL	L 7–9	0–1
Feb 4	Florida State	Mark Light Field • Coral Gables, FL	W 10–4	1–1
Feb 5	South Florida	Mark Light Field • Coral Gables, FL	L 4–6	1–2
Feb 7	Florida Atlantic	Mark Light Field • Coral Gables, FL	L 10–11	1–3
Feb 10	UCLA	Mark Light Field • Coral Gables, FL	W 6–	2–3
Feb 11	UCLA	Mark Light Field • Coral Gables, FL	W 7–6	3–3
Feb 12	UCLA	Mark Light Field • Coral Gables, FL	W 7–6	4–3
Feb 14	Bethune–Cookman	Mark Light Field • Coral Gables, FL	W 17–1	5–3
Feb 15	Italy national baseball team	Mark Light Field • Coral Gables, FL	W 10–0	
Feb 16	Seton Hall	Mark Light Field • Coral Gables, FL	L 2–3	5–4
Feb 17	Florida	Mark Light Field • Coral Gables, FL	W 9–1	6–4
Feb 18	Florida	Mark Light Field • Coral Gables, FL	L 3–10	6–5
Feb 19	Seton Hall	Mark Light Field • Coral Gables, FL	W 15–2	7–5
Feb 23	Colorado State	Mark Light Field • Coral Gables, FL	W 14–4	8–5
Feb 24	Florida State	Mark Light Field • Coral Gables, FL	W 7–0	9–5
Feb 25	Florida State	Mark Light Field • Coral Gables, FL	W 14–5	10–5
Feb 26	Florida State	Mark Light Field • Coral Gables, FL	L 6–7	10–6

March
Date	Opponent	Site/stadium	Score	Overall record
Mar 1	New Orleans	Mark Light Field • Coral Gables, FL	W 2–0	11–6
Mar 2	New Orleans	Mark Light Field • Coral Gables, FL	L 2–5	11–7
Mar 3	New Orleans	Mark Light Field • Coral Gables, FL	L 9–15	11–8
Mar 4	New Orleans	Mark Light Field • Coral Gables, FL	W 9–3	12–8
Mar 6	at South Florida	Red McEwen Field • Tampa, FL	L 7–8	12–9
Mar 6	at South Florida	Red McEwen Field • Tampa, FL	L 1–2	12–10
Mar 7	at South Florida	Red McEwen Field • Tampa, FL	L 11–18	12–11
Mar 9	South Carolina	Mark Light Field • Coral Gables, FL	L 9–14	12–12
Mar 10	South Carolina	Mark Light Field • Coral Gables, FL	W 6–3	13–12
Mar 11	South Carolina	Mark Light Field • Coral Gables, FL	W 13–11	14–12
Mar 13	Baltimore Orioles	Mark Light Field • Coral Gables, FL	L 2–12	
Mar 14	Southern Illinois	Mark Light Field • Coral Gables, FL	W 4–3	15–12
Mar 15	George Washington	Mark Light Field • Coral Gables, FL	W 17–0	16–12
Mar 16	Southern Illinois	Mark Light Field • Coral Gables, FL	W 10–7	17–12
Mar 17	Southern Illinois	Mark Light Field • Coral Gables, FL	W 11–7	18–12
Mar 18	Rutgers	Mark Light Field • Coral Gables, FL	W 11–4	19–12
Mar 19	Fordham	Mark Light Field • Coral Gables, FL	W 17–0	20–12
Mar 20	Atlanta Braves	Mark Light Field • Coral Gables, FL	L 5–13	
Mar 21	Michigan State	Mark Light Field • Coral Gables, FL	W 9–7	21–12
Mar 22	Fordham	Mark Light Field • Coral Gables, FL	W 11–4	22–12
Mar 23	Michigan State	Mark Light Field • Coral Gables, FL	W 5–3	23–12
Mar 24	Tulane	Mark Light Field • Coral Gables, FL	L 4–9	23–13
Mar 25	Cornell	Mark Light Field • Coral Gables, FL	W 8–6	24–13
Mar 28	at Florida	Perry Field • Gainesville, FL	W 8–6	25–13
Mar 28	at Florida	Perry Field • Gainesville, FL	L 6–7^{8}	25–14
Mar 30	South Florida	Mark Light Field • Coral Gables, FL	W 11–2	26–14
Mar 31	South Florida	Mark Light Field • Coral Gables, FL	W 20–3	27–14

April
Date	Opponent	Site/stadium	Score	Overall record
Apr 1	South Florida	Mark Light Field • Coral Gables, FL	L 13–6	27–15
Apr 6	Alabama	Mark Light Field • Coral Gables, FL	L 7–8	27–16
Apr 7	Alabama	Mark Light Field • Coral Gables, FL	L 1–7	27–17
Apr 8	Alabama	Mark Light Field • Coral Gables, FL	W 8–3	28–17
Apr 10	FIU	Mark Light Field • Coral Gables, FL	W 6–2	29–17
Apr 11	at FIU	Miami, FL	W 8–5	30–17
Apr 13	at Florida State	Seminole Stadium • Tallahassee, FL	L 2–3	30–18
Apr 14	at Florida State	Seminole Stadium • Tallahassee, FL	W 4–3	31–18
Apr 15	at Florida State	Seminole Stadium • Tallahassee, FL	L 4–5^{11}	31–19
Apr 17	Florida Atlantic	Mark Light Field • Coral Gables, FL	L 7–8	31–20
Apr 20	LSU	Mark Light Field • Coral Gables, FL	W 14–0	32–20
Apr 21	LSU	Mark Light Field • Coral Gables, FL	W 6–5	33–20
Apr 22	LSU	Mark Light Field • Coral Gables, FL	L 9–10	33–21
Apr 24	Florida Atlantic	Mark Light Field • Coral Gables, FL	W 6–5	34–21
Apr 26	Stetson	Mark Light Field • Coral Gables, FL	W 7–3	35–21
Apr 27	Stetson	Mark Light Field • Coral Gables, FL	W 11–1	36–21
Apr 28	Stetson	Mark Light Field • Coral Gables, FL	W 5–4	37–21

May
Date	Opponent	Site/stadium	Score	Overall record
May 6	at Maine	Mahaney Diamond • Orono, ME	L 1–3	37–22
May 6	at Maine	Mahaney Diamond • Orono, ME	L 0–5	37–23
May 9	at FIU	Miami, FL	W 5–0	38–23
May 11	FIU	Mark Light Field • Coral Gables, FL	W 5–2	39–23
May 12	FIU	Mark Light Field • Coral Gables, FL	W 8–3	40–23
May 14	at Oral Roberts	J. L. Johnson Stadium • Tusla, OK	W 13–4	41–23
May 15	at Oral Roberts	J. L. Johnson Stadium • Tulsa, OK	L 3–4	41–24
May 17	at Wichita State	Eck Stadium • Wichita, KS	L 7–8	41–25
May 18	at Wichita State	Eck Stadium • Wichita, KS	W 14–4	42–25
May 19	at Wichita State	Eck Stadium • Wichita, KS	W 5–4	43–25

Postseason

NCAA South I Regional
Date	Opponent	Site/stadium	Score	Overall record	NCAAT record
May 24	Florida	Seminole Stadium • Tallahassee, FL	W 6–5	44–25	1–0
May 26	Stetson	Seminole Stadium • Tallahassee, FL	W 13–8	45–25	2–0
May 26	East Carolina	Seminole Stadium • Tallahassee, FL	W 6–4	46–25	3–0
May 27	South Alabama	Seminole Stadium • Tallahassee, FL	L 4–6	46–26	3–1
May 28	South Alabama	Seminole Stadium • Tallahassee, FL	W 10–2	47–26	4–1

College World Series
Date	Opponent	Site/stadium	Score	Overall record	CWS record
June 2	Arizona State	Johnny Rosenblatt Stadium • Omaha, NE	L 6–9	47–27	0–1
June 3	Maine	Johnny Rosenblatt Stadium • Omaha, NE	W 13–7	48–27	1–1
June 6	Cal State Fullerton	Johnny Rosenblatt Stadium • Omaha, NE	L 5–13	48–28	1–2
