= 1984 Arizona Wildcats baseball team =

American college baseball season

1984 Arizona Wildcats baseball
- Conference: Pacific-10 Conference
- Record: 22–36 (11–19 Pac-10)
- Head coach: Jerry Kindall (12th season)
- Assistant coaches: Jerry Stitt (6th season); Jim Wing (12th season)
- Home stadium: Wildcat Field

1984 Pacific-10 Conference baseball standings
	Conf.				Overall
Team	W		L	PCT	W		L	PCT
Northern
Washington State ^{x}‍‍‍^{y}	15	–	6	.714	41	–	20	.672
Portland State ‍‍‍	15	–	6	.714	39	–	17	.696
Eastern Washington ‍‍‍	11	–	10	.524	30	–	23	.566
Oregon State ‍‍‍	11	–	11	.500	22	–	23	.489
Portland ‍‍‍	10	–	12	.455	23	–	18	.561
Gonzaga ‍‍‍	6	–	14	.300	23	–	29	.442
Washington ‍‍‍	6	–	15	.286	16	–	27	.372
Southern
No. 3 Arizona State ^{x}‍‍‍^{y}	23	–	7	.767	55	–	20	.733
No. 24 Southern California ‍‍‍	18	–	12	.600	44	–	23	.657
No. 12 Stanford ‍‍‍	18	–	12	.600	38	–	26	.594
California ‍‍‍	12	–	18	.400	39	–	28	.582
Arizona ‍‍‍	11	–	19	.367	22	–	36	.379
UCLA ‍‍‍	8	–	22	.267	28	–	32	.467
x – Division champion y – Invited to the NCAA tournament As of June 30, 1984; Rankings from Collegiate Baseball

The 1984 Arizona Wildcats baseball team represented the University of Arizona during the 1984 NCAA Division I baseball season. The Wildcats played their home games at Wildcat Field. The team was coached by Jerry Kindall in his 12th season at Arizona. The Wildcats finished 22-36 overall and placed 5th in the Pacific-10's Southern Division with an 11–19 record. Arizona missed the postseason for the 4th straight season, marking at the time the longest drought in program history; this would later be surpassed by a 5-season stretch from 1994-1998. This also marked the 1st time the program posted 2 consecutive losing seasons.

== Previous season ==
The Wildcats finished the 1983 season with a record of 25-31 and 14–15 in conference play, finishing tied for 4th in the "Six-Pac" (Pac-10 Southern). Arizona failed to advance to the postseason for the 3rd straight season, tying at the time the longest postseason drought in program history (set on 3 prior occasions).

== Personnel ==
=== Roster ===
1984 Arizona Wildcats baseball roster
• Kevin Blankenship • David Cooper • Patrick Coveney • Walter Dill • Scott Engle • Joe Estes • Chip Hale • Randal Hayes	• Derek Huenneke • Lance Lincoln • John MacArthur • Joe Magrane • Gar Millay • Scott Nossek	• Joe O'Donnell • Brian Peter • Bobby Ralston • Steven Strong • Todd Trafton • Thomas Weiser • Marc Wing • Mike Young

=== Coaches ===
1984 Arizona Wildcats baseball coaching staff
- Jerry Kindall - Head coach
- Jerry Stitt - Assistant coach
- Jim Wing - Assistant coach

== 1984 Schedule and results ==
1984 Arizona Wildcats baseball game log
Regular season
Date	Opponent	Site/Stadium	Score	Overall Record	Pac-10 Record
Jan 30	Cal State Dominguez Hills	Wildcat Field • Tucson, AZ	W 12-6	1-0	
Jan 31	Cal State Dominguez Hills	Wildcat Field • Tucson, AZ	W 6-4	2-0	
Feb 3	UNLV	Wildcat Field • Tucson, AZ	L 6-9	2-1	
Feb 4	UNLV	Wildcat Field • Tucson, AZ	W 10-1	3-1	
Feb 4	UNLV	Wildcat Field • Tucson, AZ	L 1-2	3-2	
Feb 6	UC Riverside	Wildcat Field • Tucson, AZ	L 5-14	3-3	
Feb 7	UC Riverside	Wildcat Field • Tucson, AZ	W 11-6	4-3	
Feb 10	at Cal State Fullerton	Titan Field • Fullerton, CA	W 4-1	5-3	
Feb 11	at Cal State Fullerton	Titan Field • Fullerton, CA	W 8-7	6-3	
Feb 11	at Cal State Fullerton	Titan Field • Fullerton, CA	L 1-5	6-4	
Feb 13	New Mexico State	Wildcat Field • Tucson, AZ	W 12-6	7-4	
Feb 14	New Mexico State	Wildcat Field • Tucson, AZ	W 27-10	8-4	
Feb 16	Cal State Fullerton	Wildcat Field • Tucson, AZ	L 1-4	8-5	
Feb 17	Cal State Fullerton	Wildcat Field • Tucson, AZ	L 3-15	8-6	
Feb 18	Cal State Fullerton	Wildcat Field • Tucson, AZ	L 6-13	8-7	
Feb 20	UTEP	Wildcat Field • Tucson, AZ	W 5-4	9-7	
Feb 21	UTEP	Wildcat Field • Tucson, AZ	L 2-9	9-8	
Feb 24	Oklahoma State	Wildcat Field • Tucson, AZ	L 7-10	9-9	
Feb 25	Oklahoma State	Wildcat Field • Tucson, AZ	L 13-21	9-10	
Feb 26	Oklahoma State	Wildcat Field • Tucson, AZ	L 11-12	9-11	
Feb 27	Cal State Northridge	Wildcat Field • Tucson, AZ	L 6-8	9-12	
Feb 28	Cal State Northridge	Wildcat Field • Tucson, AZ	L 3-11	9-13	
Mar 2	Stanford	Wildcat Field • Tucson, AZ	W 12-2	10-13	1-0
Mar 3	Stanford	Wildcat Field • Tucson, AZ	L 11-14	10-14	1-1
Mar 4	Stanford	Wildcat Field • Tucson, AZ	W 13-10	11-14	2-1
Mar 9	at Arizona State	Packard Stadium • Tempe, AZ	L 4-7	11-15	2-2
Mar 10	at Arizona State	Packard Stadium • Tempe, AZ	L 1-11	11-16	2-3
Mar 11	at Arizona State	Packard Stadium • Tempe, AZ	L 2-7	11-17	2-4
Mar 13	at San Diego	John Cunningham Stadium • San Diego, CA	W 22-1	12-17	
Mar 14	at San Diego	John Cunningham Stadium • San Diego, CA	W 7-5	13-17	
Mar 15	at San Diego State	Smith Field • San Diego, CA	L 4-5	13-18	
Mar 16	at San Diego State	Smith Field • San Diego, CA	L 2-3	13-19	
Mar 17	at San Diego State	Smith Field • San Diego, CA	L 3-9	13-20	
Mar 23	at USC	Dedeaux Field • Los Angeles, CA	L 7-11	13-21	2-5
Mar 24	at USC	Dedeaux Field • Los Angeles, CA	L 3-9	13-22	2-6
Mar 25	at USC	Dedeaux Field • Los Angeles, CA	L 2-14	13-23	2-7
Mar 27	Grand Canyon	Wildcat Field • Tucson, AZ	L 9-14	13-24	
Mar 30	California	Wildcat Field • Tucson, AZ	W 6-2	14-24	3-7
Mar 31	California	Wildcat Field • Tucson, AZ	W 9-3	15-24	4-7
Apr 1	California	Wildcat Field • Tucson, AZ	W 10-9	16-24	5-7
Apr 6	at UCLA	Jackie Robinson Stadium • Los Angeles, CA	L 3-4	16-25	5-8
Apr 7	at UCLA	Jackie Robinson Stadium • Los Angeles, CA	L 3-18	16-26	5-9
Apr 8	at UCLA	Jackie Robinson Stadium • Los Angeles, CA	W 8-5	17-26	6-9
Apr 13	at Stanford	Sunken Diamond • Palo Alto, CA	L 5-12	17-27	6-10
Apr 14	at Stanford	Sunken Diamond • Palo Alto, CA	L 3-4	17-28	6-11
Apr 15	at Stanford	Sunken Diamond • Palo Alto, CA	L 1-4	17-29	6-12
Apr 19	USC	Wildcat Field • Tucson, AZ	W 6-5	18-29	7-12
Apr 20	USC	Wildcat Field • Tucson, AZ	W 9-5	19-29	8-12
Apr 21	USC	Wildcat Field • Tucson, AZ	W 8-7	20-29	9-12
Apr 27	at California	Evans Diamond • Berkeley, CA	L 9-11	20-30	9-13
Apr 28	at California	Evans Diamond • Berkeley, CA	L 4-7	20-31	9-14
Apr 29	at California	Evans Diamond • Berkeley, CA	L 4-5	20-32	9-15
May 4	UCLA	Wildcat Field • Tucson, AZ	W 10-4	21-32	10-15
May 5	UCLA	Wildcat Field • Tucson, AZ	L 5-7	21-33	10-16
May 6	UCLA	Wildcat Field • Tucson, AZ	L 6-17	21-34	10-17
May 11	Arizona State	Wildcat Field • Tucson, AZ	L 5-8	21-35	10-18
May 12	Arizona State	Wildcat Field • Tucson, AZ	L 4-6	21-36	10-19
May 13	Arizona State	Wildcat Field • Tucson, AZ	W 9-5	22-36	11-19

== 1984 MLB draft ==
Player	Position	Round	Overall	MLB team
Bobby Ralston	INF	6	64	Minnesota Twins
Scott Nossek	LHP	35	154	Chicago White Sox
