= 1984 Texas Longhorns baseball team =

American college baseball season

1984 Texas Longhorns baseball

Southwest Conference champions SWC tournament Champions

College World Series, runner-up
- Conference: Southwest Conference
- CB: No. 2
- Record: 60-14 (16–5 SWC)
- Head coach: Cliff Gustafson (17th year)
- Home stadium: Disch–Falk Field

1984 Southwest Conference baseball standings
	Conf.				Overall
Team	W		L	PCT	W		L	PCT
No. 2 Texas ‍†‍‡‍^{y}	16	–	5	.762	60	–	14	.811
Rice ‍‍‍	13	–	8	.619	41	–	14	.745
No. 19 Texas A&M ‍‍‍^{y}	13	–	8	.619	41	–	21	.661
Arkansas ‍‍‍	12	–	9	.571	40	–	16	.714
Baylor ‍‍‍	9	–	12	.429	26	–	23	.531
Texas Tech ‍‍‍	9	–	12	.429	33	–	22	.600
Houston ‍‍‍	6	–	15	.286	32	–	33	.492
TCU ‍‍‍	6	–	15	.286	25	–	22	.532
† – Conference champion ‡ – Tournament champion y – Invited to the NCAA tournament As of June 30, 1984; Rankings from Collegiate Baseball

The 1984 Texas Longhorns baseball team represented the University of Texas at Austin in the 1984 NCAA Division I baseball season. The Longhorns played their home games at Disch–Falk Field. The team was coached by Cliff Gustafson in his 17th season at Texas.

The Longhorns reached the College World Series final, but were eliminated by Cal State Fullerton.

== Personnel ==
=== Roster ===
1984 Texas Longhorns roster
Pitchers: 21 - Greg Swindell; 23 - Steve Labay; 29 - Bruce Ruffin; 42 - James Harris; Catchers: 10 - Darren Loy; 6- Mark Worley; 8 - Mike Anderson; 14 Chuck Oertli	Infielders: 1 - Billy Bates; 4 - Jamie Doughty; 6 - David Denny; 24 - Rusty Richards; Outfielders: 15 - Doug Hodo; 27 - Dennis Cook; 13 - Scott Vondenkamp; 3 - Elanis Westbrooks; 25 - David Wrzesinski	Unknown: 11 - Mike Simon; 20 - Wade Phillips; 22 - Eric Boudreaux

=== Coaches ===
1984 Texas Longhorns baseball coaching staff
- Cliff Gustafson - Head coach - 17th year
- Bill Bethea - Assistant coach - 15th year
- Clint Thomas - Assistant coach - 5th year
- Deron Gustafson - Assistant coach - 1st year

== Schedule ==
1984 Texas Longhorns baseball game log
Regular season
February

Date	Opponent	Site/stadium	Score	Overall Record	SWC Record
February 17	Texas Lutheran	Disch–Falk Field • Austin, TX	W 9–1	1–0	
February 17	Texas Lutheran	Disch–Falk Field • Austin, TX	W 12–10	2–0	
February 18	Texas–Arlington	Disch–Falk Field • Austin, TX	W 7–0	3–0	
February 18	Texas–Arlington	Disch–Falk Field • Austin, TX	W 14–0	4–0	
February 19	Texas–Arlington	Disch–Falk Field • Austin, TX	W 3–2	5–0	
February 19	Texas–Arlington	Disch–Falk Field • Austin, TX	W 12–7	6–0	
February 23	at Arizona State	Packard Stadium • Tempe, AZ	W 6–4	7–0	
February 24	at Arizona State	Packard Stadium • Tempe, AZ	L 0–4	7–1	
February 25	at Arizona State	Packard Stadium • Tempe, AZ	L 5–6	7–2	
February 28	St. Mary's (TX)	Disch–Falk Field • Austin, TX	W 6–3	8–2	
February 28	St. Mary's (TX)	Disch–Falk Field • Austin, TX	W 16–4	9–2	

March

Date	Opponent	Site/stadium	Score	Overall Record	SWC Record
March 2	Cal State Fullerton	Disch–Falk Field • Austin, TX	L 2–10	9–3	
March 2	Cal State Fullerton	Disch–Falk Field • Austin, TX	W 4–2	10–3	
March 3	Cal State Fullerton	Disch–Falk Field • Austin, TX	W 8–3	11–3	
March 4	Southwestern Louisiana	Disch–Falk Field • Austin, TX	W 8–4	12–3	
March 9	Maine	Disch–Falk Field • Austin, TX	W 26–6	13–3	
March 10	Maine	Disch–Falk Field • Austin, TX	W 7–6^{8}	14–3	
March 10	Maine	Disch–Falk Field • Austin, TX	W 6–1	15–3	
March 11	Emporia State	Disch–Falk Field • Austin, TX	W 14–1	16–3	
March 11	Emporia State	Disch–Falk Field • Austin, TX	W 7–2	17–3	
March 12	Emporia State	Disch–Falk Field • Austin, TX	W 11–6	18–3	
March 12	Emporia State	Disch–Falk Field • Austin, TX	W 8–3	19–3	
March 13	Arizona State	Disch–Falk Field • Austin, TX	W 6–5	20–3	
March 14	Arizona State	Disch–Falk Field • Austin, TX	W 3–2	21–3	
March 15	Dallas Baptist	Disch–Falk Field • Austin, TX	W 5–2	22–3	
March 15	Dallas Baptist	Disch–Falk Field • Austin, TX	W 13–3	23–3	
March 16	Dallas Baptist	Disch–Falk Field • Austin, TX	W 14–3	24–3	
March 16	Dallas Baptist	Disch–Falk Field • Austin, TX	L 6–7	24–4	
March 17	Texas Wesleyan	Disch–Falk Field • Austin, TX	W 12–0	25–4	
March 17	Texas Wesleyan	Disch–Falk Field • Austin, TX	W 13–3	26–4	
March 18	Texas Wesleyan	Disch–Falk Field • Austin, TX	W 6–2	27–4	
March 18	Texas Wesleyan	Disch–Falk Field • Austin, TX	W 10–8	28–4	
March 19	Southwestern Oklahoma State	Disch–Falk Field • Austin, TX	W 12–6	29–4	
March 19	Southwestern Oklahoma State	Disch–Falk Field • Austin, TX	W 12–5	30–4	
March 20	Hardin–Simmons	Disch–Falk Field • Austin, TX	W 11–4	31–4	
March 20	Hardin–Simmons	Disch–Falk Field • Austin, TX	W 13–2	32–4	
March 24	at Houston	Cougar Field • Houston, TX	W 4–3	33–4	1–0
March 24	at Houston	Cougar Field • Houston, TX	W 19–0	34–4	2–0
March 25	at Houston	Cougar Field • Houston, TX	W 12–10	35–4	3–0
March 30	Arkansas	Disch–Falk Field • Austin, TX	W 5–2	36–4	4–0
March 31	Arkansas	Disch–Falk Field • Austin, TX	W 7–5	37–4	5–0
March 31	Arkansas	Disch–Falk Field • Austin, TX	L 4–13	37–5	5–1

April

Date	Opponent	Site/stadium	Score	Overall Record	SWC Record
April 2	Lubbock Christian	Disch–Falk Field • Austin, TX	L 2–3	37–6	
April 2	Lubbock Christian	Disch–Falk Field • Austin, TX	L 1–6	37–7	
April 3	Lubbock Christian	Disch–Falk Field • Austin, TX	L 1–3	37–8	
April 3	Lubbock Christian	Disch–Falk Field • Austin, TX	W 5–4	38–8	
April 6	at TCU	TCU Diamond • Fort Worth, TX	W 12–1	39–8	6–1
April 7	at TCU	TCU Diamond • Fort Worth, TX	L 6–7^{10}	39–9	6–2
April 8	at TCU	TCU Diamond • Fort Worth, TX	W 16–8	40–9	7–2
April 13	Baylor	Disch–Falk Field • Austin, TX	W 11–1	41–9	8–2
April 14	Baylor	Disch–Falk Field • Austin, TX	W 7–2	42–9	9–2
April 14	Baylor	Disch–Falk Field • Austin, TX	W 5–0	43–9	10–2
April 20	at Rice	Cameron Field • Houston, TX	L 2–3^{13}	43–10	10–3
April 21	at Rice	Cameron Field • Houston, TX	W 3–2	44–10	11–3
April 21	at Rice	Cameron Field • Houston, TX	W 10–4	45–10	12–3
April 24	Southwestern	Disch–Falk Field • Austin, TX	W 5–2	46–10	
April 24	Southwestern	Disch–Falk Field • Austin, TX	W 9–1	47–10	
April 28	at Texas Tech	Tech Diamond • Lubbock, TX	W 7–3	48–10	13–3
April 28	at Texas Tech	Tech Diamond • Lubbock, TX	W 8–2	49–10	14–3
April 30	at Texas Tech	Tech Diamond • Lubbock, TX	L 5–8	49–11	14–4

May

Date	Opponent	Site/stadium	Score	Overall Record	SWC Record
May 4	Texas A&M	Disch–Falk Field • Austin, TX	W 12–6	50–11	15–4
May 5	Texas A&M	Disch–Falk Field • Austin, TX	L 7–10	50–12	15–5
May 5	Texas A&M	Disch–Falk Field • Austin, TX	W 13–6	51–12	16–5

Postseason
SWC Tournament

Date	Opponent	Site/stadium	Score	Overall Record	SWCT Record
May 11	Arkansas	Disch–Falk Field • Austin, TX	W 8–1	52–12	1–0
May 12	Texas A&M	Disch–Falk Field • Austin, TX	W 15–4	53–12	2–0
May 13	Texas A&M	Disch–Falk Field • Austin, TX	W 9–5	54–12	3–0

NCAA tournament: Central Regional

Date	Opponent	Site/stadium	Score	Overall Record	NCAAT Record
May 25	Lamar	Disch–Falk Field • Austin, TX	W 6–0	55–12	1–0
May 25	UNLV	Disch–Falk Field • Austin, TX	W 12–3	56–12	2–0
May 27	Lamar	Disch–Falk Field • Austin, TX	W 6–5	57–12	3–0

NCAA tournament: College World Series

Date	Opponent	Site/stadium	Score	Overall Record	CWS Record
June 1	New Orleans	Johnny Rosenblatt Stadium • Omaha, NE	W 6–3	58–12	1–0
June 4	Cal State Fullerton	Johnny Rosenblatt Stadium • Omaha, NE	W 6–4	59–12	2–0
June 7	Arizona State	Johnny Rosenblatt Stadium • Omaha, NE	W 8–4	60–12	3–0
June 8	Oklahoma State	Johnny Rosenblatt Stadium • Omaha, NE	L 13–18	60–13	3–1
June 10	Cal State Fullerton	Johnny Rosenblatt Stadium • Omaha, NE	L 1–3	60–14	3–2
