= 1984 Arizona State Sun Devils baseball team =

Arizona State Sun Devils baseball season

1984 Arizona State Sun Devils baseball

NCAA West II Regional champions

College World Series, 2–2
- Conference: Pacific-10 Conference
- Record: 55–20 (23–7 Pac-10)
- Head coach: Jim Brock (13th year)
- Home stadium: Packard Stadium

1984 Pacific-10 Conference baseball standings
	Conf.				Overall
Team	W		L	PCT	W		L	PCT
Northern
Washington State ^{x}‍‍‍^{y}	15	–	6	.714	41	–	20	.672
Portland State ‍‍‍	15	–	6	.714	39	–	17	.696
Eastern Washington ‍‍‍	11	–	10	.524	30	–	23	.566
Oregon State ‍‍‍	11	–	11	.500	22	–	23	.489
Portland ‍‍‍	10	–	12	.455	23	–	18	.561
Gonzaga ‍‍‍	6	–	14	.300	23	–	29	.442
Washington ‍‍‍	6	–	15	.286	16	–	27	.372
Southern
No. 3 Arizona State ^{x}‍‍‍^{y}	23	–	7	.767	55	–	20	.733
No. 24 Southern California ‍‍‍	18	–	12	.600	44	–	23	.657
No. 12 Stanford ‍‍‍	18	–	12	.600	38	–	26	.594
California ‍‍‍	12	–	18	.400	39	–	28	.582
Arizona ‍‍‍	11	–	19	.367	22	–	36	.379
UCLA ‍‍‍	8	–	22	.267	28	–	32	.467
x – Division champion y – Invited to the NCAA tournament As of June 30, 1984; Rankings from Collegiate Baseball

The 1984 Arizona State Sun Devils baseball team represented Arizona State University in the 1984 NCAA Division I baseball season. The Sun Devils played their home games at Packard Stadium, and played as part of the Pacific-10 Conference. The team was coached by Jim Brock in his thirteenth season as head coach at Arizona State.

The Sun Devils reached the College World Series, their thirteenth appearance in Omaha, where they finished in fourth place after winning games against Miami (FL) and Oklahoma State and losing to eventual runner-up Texas and champion Cal State Fullerton.

== Personnel ==
=== Roster ===
1984 Arizona State Sun Devils roster
Pitchers: – Chris Beasley; – Kendall Carter; – Dave Graybill – Junior; – Doug Henry – Sophomore; – Gilbert Villanueva – Sophomore; Catchers: – Don Wakamatsu – Junior	Infielders: – Romy Cucjen – Senior; – Bob Grandstaff – Junior; – Louie Medina – Junior; – Steve Murray – Junior; – George Lopez – Junior; Outfielders: 24 – Barry Bonds – Sophomore; – Todd Brown – Junior; – Mike Devereaux; 0 – Oddibe McDowell – Senior	Unknown: – Ted Dyson; – Shawn Gilbert; – Lew Kent; – Randy Rector; – Jose Rodiles; – Charles Scott; – Ed Serrano; – Greg Shirley; – Drew Siler; – Mike Thorpe; – Dave Tinoco; – Kevin Williamson

=== Coaches ===
1984 Arizona State Sun Devils baseball coaching staff
- Jim Brock – Head coach – 13th year

== Schedule and results ==
Legend
Arizona State win
Arizona State loss

1984 Arizona State Sun Devils baseball game log
Regular season

February
Date	Opponent	Site/stadium	Score	Overall record	Pac-10 record
Feb 1	Cal State Los Angeles*	Packard Stadium • Tempe, AZ	W 8–3	1–0	
Feb 2	Cal State Los Angeles*	Packard Stadium • Tempe, AZ	W 8–0	2–0	
Feb 3	Cal Poly Pomona*	Packard Stadium • Tempe, AZ	L 6–7	2–1	
Feb 4	Cal Poly Pomona*	Packard Stadium • Tempe, AZ	W 13–10	3–1	
Feb 4	Cal Poly Pomona*	Packard Stadium • Tempe, AZ	W 6–3	4–1	
Feb 6	Lubbock Christian*	Packard Stadium • Tempe, AZ	W 12–2	5–1	
Feb 7	Lubbock Christian*	Packard Stadium • Tempe, AZ	L 9–10	5–2	
Feb 8	Lubbock Christian*	Packard Stadium • Tempe, AZ	W 5–3	6–2	
Feb 10	New Mexico*	Packard Stadium • Tempe, AZ	W 5–1	7–2	
Feb 11	New Mexico*	Packard Stadium • Tempe, AZ	W 9–5	8–2	
Feb 11	New Mexico*	Packard Stadium • Tempe, AZ	W 5–2	9–2	
Feb 16	Pepperdine*	Packard Stadium • Tempe, AZ	W 15–4	10–2	
Feb 17	Pepperdine*	Packard Stadium • Tempe, AZ	W 11–6	11–2	
Feb 18	Pepperdine*	Packard Stadium • Tempe, AZ	L 7–9	11–3	
Feb 23	Texas*	Packard Stadium • Tempe, AZ	L 4–6	11–4	
Feb 24	Texas*	Packard Stadium • Tempe, AZ	W 4–0	12–4	
Feb 25	Texas*	Packard Stadium • Tempe, AZ	W 6–5	13–4	
Feb 27	Oklahoma State*	Packard Stadium • Tempe, AZ	W 9–5	14–4	
Feb 28	Oklahoma State*	Packard Stadium • Tempe, AZ	W 4–0	15–4	

March
Date	Opponent	Site/stadium	Score	Overall record	Pac-10 record
Mar 1	Oklahoma State*	Packard Stadium • Tempe, AZ	W 10–9	16–4	
Mar 2	at Hawaii*	Rainbow Stadium • Honolulu, HI	L 3–4	16–5	
Mar 3	at Hawaii*	Rainbow Stadium • Honolulu, HI	L 3–8	16–6	
Mar 3	at Hawaii*	Rainbow Stadium • Honolulu, HI	W 13–7	17–6	
Mar 4	at Hawaii*	Rainbow Stadium • Honolulu, HI	W 5–4	18–6	
Mar 6	Grand Canyon*	Packard Stadium • Tempe, AZ	L 4–15	18–7	
Mar 7	Mesa State*	Packard Stadium • Tempe, AZ	W 6–3	19–7	
Mar 9	Arizona	Packard Stadium • Tempe, AZ	W 7–4	20–7	1–0
Mar 10	Arizona	Packard Stadium • Tempe, AZ	W 11–1	21–7	2–0
Mar 11	Arizona	Packard Stadium • Tempe, AZ	W 7–2	22–7	3–0
Mar 13	at Texas*	Disch–Falk Field • Austin, TX	L 5–6	22–8	
Mar 14	at Texas*	Disch–Falk Field • Austin, TX	L 2–3	22–9	
Mar 16	Southern California	Packard Stadium • Tempe, AZ	W 9–0	23–9	4–0
Mar 17	Southern California	Packard Stadium • Tempe, AZ	L 3–8	23–10	4–1
Mar 18	Southern California	Packard Stadium • Tempe, AZ	W 15–2	24–10	5–1
Mar 23	at California	Evans Diamond • Berkeley, CA	W 11–4	25–10	6–1
Mar 24	at California	Evans Diamond • Berkeley, CA	W 10–5	26–10	7–1
Mar 25	at California	Evans Diamond • Berkeley, CA	W 6–2	27–10	8–1
Mar 30	UCLA	Packard Stadium • Tempe, AZ	W 13–3	28–10	9–1
Mar 31	UCLA	Packard Stadium • Tempe, AZ	W 11–6	29–10	10–1

April
Date	Opponent	Site/stadium	Score	Overall record	Pac-10 record
Apr 1	UCLA	Packard Stadium • Tempe, AZ	W 14–13	30–10	11–1
Apr 6	at Stanford	Sunken Diamond • Stanford, CA	W 12–2	31–10	12–1
Apr 7	at Stanford	Sunken Diamond • Stanford, CA	W 7–6	32–10	13–1
Apr 8	at Stanford	Sunken Diamond • Stanford, CA	W 7–6	33–10	14–1
Apr 10	at Grand Canyon*	Brazell Stadium • Phoenix, AZ	L 5–8	33–11	
Apr 13	at Southern California	Dedeaux Field • Los Angeles, CA	L 7–8	33–12	14–2
Apr 14	at Southern California	Dedeaux Field • Los Angeles, CA	L 4–12	33–13	14–3
Apr 15	at Southern California	Dedeaux Field • Los Angeles, CA	W 7–6	34–13	15–3
Apr 17	Grand Canyon*	Packard Stadium • Tempe, AZ	W 9–4	35–13	
Apr 18	Cal Lutheran*	Packard Stadium • Tempe, AZ	W 9–1	36–13	
Apr 19	California	Packard Stadium • Tempe, AZ	W 14–9	37–13	16–3
Apr 20	California	Packard Stadium • Tempe, AZ	L 6–7	37–14	16–4
Apr 21	California	Packard Stadium • Tempe, AZ	W 10–2	38–14	17–4
Apr 23	La Verne*	Packard Stadium • Tempe, AZ	W 7–3	39–14	
Apr 24	La Verne*	Packard Stadium • Tempe, AZ	W 22–0	40–14	
Apr 27	at UCLA	Jackie Robinson Stadium • Los Angeles, CA	W 11–5	41–14	18–4
Apr 28	at UCLA	Jackie Robinson Stadium • Los Angeles, CA	W 19–10	42–14	19–4
Apr 29	at UCLA	Jackie Robinson Stadium • Los Angeles, CA	W 8–5	43–14	20–4

May
Date	Opponent	Site/stadium	Score	Overall record	Pac-10 record
May 1	UNLV*	Packard Stadium • Tempe, AZ	W 9–8	44–14	
May 1	UNLV *	Packard Stadium • Tempe, AZ	W 10–4	45–14	
May 4	Stanford	Packard Stadium • Tempe, AZ	W 8–7	46–14	21–4
May 5	Stanford	Packard Stadium • Tempe, AZ	L 4–6	46–15	21–5
May 6	Stanford	Packard Stadium • Tempe, AZ	L 11–13	46–16	21–6
May 11	at Arizona	Wildcat Field • Tucson, AZ	W 8–5	47–16	22–6
May 12	at Arizona	Wildcat Field • Tucson, AZ	W 6–4	48–16	23–6
May 13	at Arizona	Wildcat Field • Tucson, AZ	L 5–9	48–17	23–7
May 17	North Carolina*	Packard Stadium • Tempe, AZ	W 6–4	49–17	
May 18	North Carolina*	Packard Stadium • Tempe, AZ	L 1–3	49–18	
May 19	North Carolina*	Packard Stadium • Tempe, AZ	W 9–6	50–18	

Postseason

NCAA West II Regional
Date	Opponent	Site/stadium	Score	Overall record	Reg Record
May 25	Washington State	Packard Stadium • Tempe, AZ	W 8–4	51–18	1–0
May 26	Hawaii	Packard Stadium • Tempe, AZ	W 15–11	52–18	2–0
May 27	Stanford	Packard Stadium • Tempe, AZ	W 5–4	53–18	3–0

College World Series
Date	Opponent	Site/stadium	Score	Overall record	CWS record
June 2	Miami (FL)	Johnny Rosenblatt Stadium • Omaha, NE	W 9–6	54–18	1–0
June 5	Oklahoma State	Johnny Rosenblatt Stadium • Omaha, NE	W 23–12	55–18	2–0
June 7	Texas	Johnny Rosenblatt Stadium • Omaha, NE	L 4–8	55–19	2–1
June 8	Cal State Fullerton	Johnny Rosenblatt Stadium • Omaha, NE	L 1–6	55–20	2–2
