= Rusty Richards =

American baseball player

- Pitcher
- Born: January 27, 1965 (age 61); Houston, Texas, U.S.
- Batted: Left Threw: Right

MLB debut
- September 20, 1989, for the Atlanta Braves

Last MLB appearance
- July 6, 1990, for the Atlanta Braves

MLB statistics
- Win–loss record: 0–0
- Earned run average: 6.97
- Strikeouts: 4
- Stats at Baseball Reference

Teams
- Atlanta Braves (1989–1990)

Russell Earl Richards (born January 27, 1965) is an American former professional baseball pitcher. He played parts of two seasons in Major League Baseball, 1989 and 1990, for the Atlanta Braves.
