= Gary Green (baseball) =

American baseball player (born 1962)

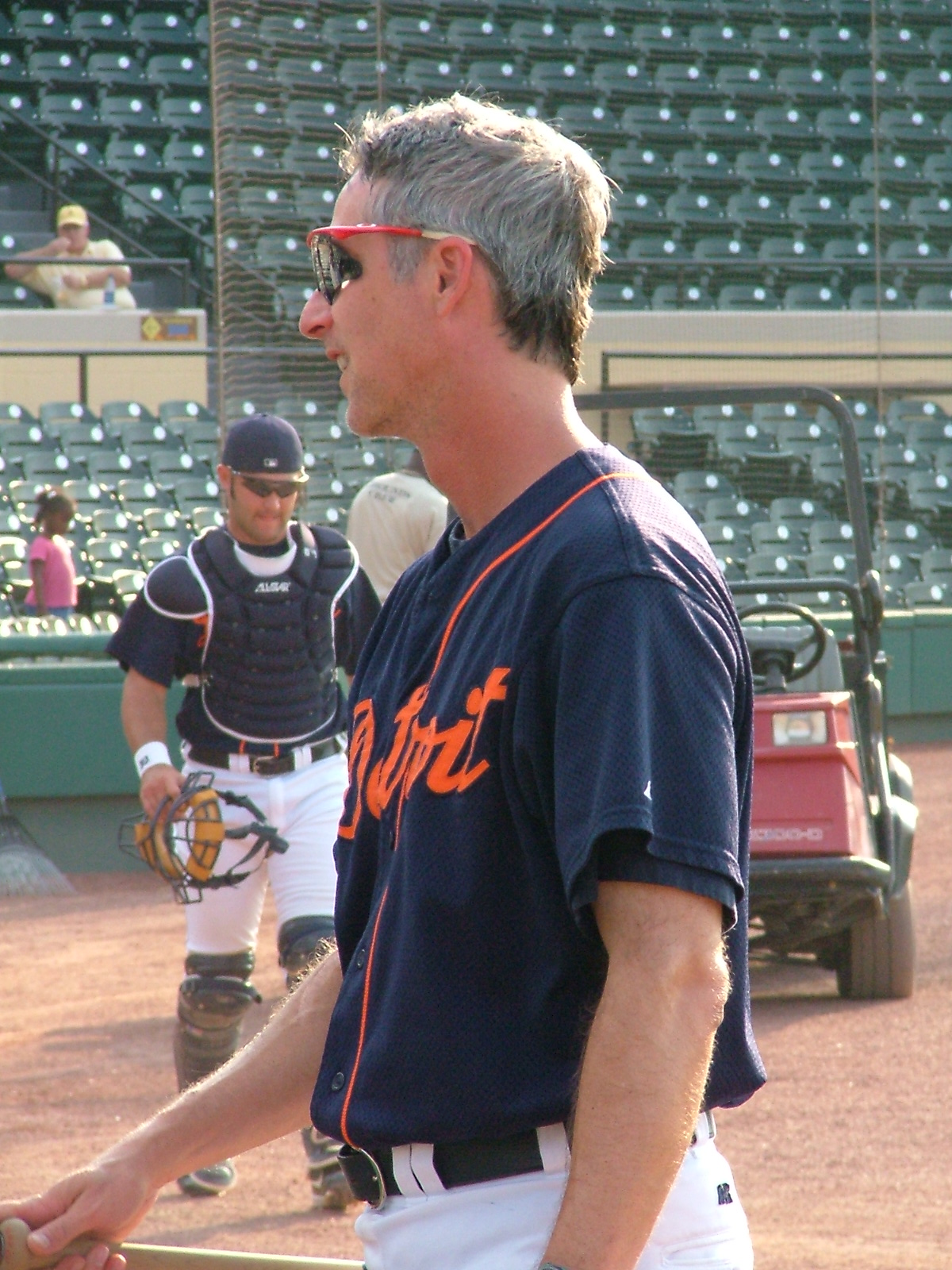
- Green with the Detroit Tigers in 2004
- Shortstop
- Born: January 14, 1962 (age 64); Pittsburgh, Pennsylvania, U.S.
- Batted: Right Threw: Right

MLB debut
- September 14, 1986, for the San Diego Padres

Last MLB appearance
- May 4, 1992, for the Cincinnati Reds

MLB statistics
- Batting average: .222
- Home runs: 0
- Runs batted in: 11
- Stats at Baseball Reference

Teams
- San Diego Padres (1986, 1989); Texas Rangers (1990–1991); Cincinnati Reds (1992)
Medals
Representing United States
Men's baseball
Summer Olympics
Silver medal – second place	1984 Los Angeles	Team

Gary Allan Green (born January 14, 1962) is an American former Major League Baseball (MLB) shortstop who played for the San Diego Padres, Texas Rangers, and Cincinnati Reds between 1986 and 1992.

== Amateur career ==
Green attended Pittsburgh's Taylor Allderdice High School and Oklahoma State University. In 1982, he played collegiate summer baseball with the Chatham A's of the Cape Cod Baseball League. He was selected three times in baseball's amateur draft: a 29th round pick by the San Francisco Giants in 1980, a second-round pick by the St. Louis Cardinals in 1983, and a first-round choice of the San Diego Padres in 1984.

== Professional career ==
Green's best season was in 1990, when he was the starting shortstop for the Texas Rangers in 31 games. During that season, he had his most hits in a game when he went 3 for 4 against the Seattle Mariners in a 6–5 Rangers victory on August 20. In 106 major league games, he had 180 at-bats and a .222 batting average.

== Coaching career ==
=== Detroit Tigers ===
Green was the manager of the Class A West Virginia Power. He also managed the Oneonta Tigers of the New York Penn League during the 2000 and 2001 seasons. Green coached in the Tigers organization until 2004.

=== Pittsburgh Pirates ===
Green joined the Pittsburgh Pirates organization in 2006 and managed until 2010. In 2011 he was named as the minor league infield coordinator. In 2021, he was named as the bench coach for the Altoona Curve the Double-A affiliate of the Pirates. In 2022, he was named bench coach for the Indianapolis Indians the Pirates Triple-A affiliate. In 2023, Green returned to the Pirates Double-A affiliate Altoona Curve as the bench coach.

== Personal ==
Green's father Fred Green pitched for the 1960 World Series champion Pittsburgh Pirates.
