= 1984 NCAA Division I baseball tournament =

- Season: 1984
- Teams: 36
- Finals site: Johnny Rosenblatt Stadium; Omaha, NE
- Champions: Cal State Fullerton (2nd title)
- Runner-up: Texas (22nd CWS Appearance)
- Winning coach: Augie Garrido (2nd title)
- MOP: John Fishel (Cal State Fullerton)

The 1984 NCAA Division I baseball tournament was played at the end of the 1984 NCAA Division I baseball season to determine the national champion of college baseball. The tournament concluded with eight teams competing in the College World Series, a double-elimination tournament in its thirty eighth year. Eight regional competitions were held to determine the participants in the final event. Six regions held a four team, double-elimination tournament while two regions included six teams, resulting in 36 teams participating in the tournament at the conclusion of their regular season, and in some cases, after a conference tournament. The thirty-eighth tournament's champion was Cal State Fullerton, coached by Augie Garrido. The Most Outstanding Player was John Fishel of Cal State Fullerton.

== National seeds ==
Bold indicates CWS participant.

- **Arizona State**
- **Cal State Fullerton**
- North Carolina
- **Oklahoma State**
- **Texas**

== Regionals ==
The opening rounds of the tournament were played across eight regional sites across the country, six consisting of four teams and two of six teams. The winners of each Regional advanced to the College World Series.

Bold indicates winner.

=== Central Regional at Austin, TX ===
Upper round 1
**UNLV**	**2**
Oklahoma	1
**Texas**	**6**
Lamar	0
Lower round 1
**Lamar**	**4**
Oklahoma	3

Upper final
UNLV	3
**Texas**	**12**
Lower final
UNLV	5
**Lamar**	**10**

Final
**Texas**	**6**^{10}	—
Lamar	5	—

=== Mideast Regional at Mt. Pleasant, MI ===
Upper round 1
**Michigan**	**13**
Temple	9
**Indiana State**	**4**
Central Michigan	2
Lower round 1
Temple	10
**Central Michigan**	**15**

Upper final
**Michigan**	**8**
Indiana State	2
Lower final
**Central Michigan**	**4**
Indiana State	0

Final
**Michigan**	**4**	—
Central Michigan	3	—

=== Midwest Regional at Stillwater, OK ===
Upper round 1
**Oklahoma City**	**2**
Texas A&M	1
**Oklahoma State**	**21**
Grambling State	5
Lower round 1
Grambling State	5
**Texas A&M**	**11**

Upper final
**Oklahoma City**	**5**
Oklahoma State	2
Lower final
**Oklahoma State**	**5**
Texas A&M	0

Final
Oklahoma City	1	4
**Oklahoma State**	**11**	**9**

=== Northeast Regional at Orono, ME ===
Upper round 1
**Harvard**	**10**
Seton Hall	8
**Maine**	**12**
Rider	6
Lower round 1
**Seton Hall**	**7**
Rider	5

Upper final
Harvard	4
**Maine**	**5**^{12}
Lower final
**Seton Hall**	**9**
Harvard	1

Final
**Maine**	2	**5**
Seton Hall	**3**	2

=== South I Regional at Tallahassee, FL ===
First round
1	**East Carolina**	**6**
6	South Alabama	5
2	**Miami (FL)**	**6**
5	Florida	5
3	**Stetson**	**10**
4	Florida State	7

Second round
**East Carolina**	**7**
Florida State	4
**Miami (FL)**	**13**
Stetson	8
**South Alabama**	**7**
Florida	4

Third round
East Carolina	4
**Miami (FL)**	**6**
Stetson	9
**South Alabama**	**10**

Semifinals
East Carolina	2
**South Alabama**	**18**

Final
**Miami (FL)**	4	**10**
South Alabama	**6**	2

=== South II Regional at Starkville, MS ===
First round
1	**New Orleans**	**1**
6	Appalachian State	0
2	**North Carolina**	**4**
5	Eastern Kentucky	2
3	**South Carolina**	**4**
4	Mississippi State	1

Second round
New Orleans	4
**Mississippi State**	**11**
Appalachian State	9
**Eastern Kentucky**	**11**
North Carolina	4
**South Carolina**	**5**
**New Orleans**	**13**
North Carolina	6

Third round
**Mississippi State**	**13**
Eastern Kentucky	8
South Carolina	5
**New Orleans**	**6**

Semifinals
**Mississippi State**	**18**
South Carolina	9

Final
Mississippi State	3
**New Orleans**	**6**

=== West I Regional at Fresno, CA ===
Upper round 1
**Cal State Fullerton**	**10**
Southern California	6
**San Diego State**	**10**
Fresno State	6
Lower round 1
Southern California	12
**Fresno State**	**15**

Upper final
**Cal State Fullerton**	**16**
San Diego State	6
Lower final
**San Diego State**	**10**
Fresno State	7

Final
**Cal State Fullerton**	5	**8**^{11}
San Diego State	**9**	7

=== West II Regional at Tempe, AZ ===
Upper round 1
**Hawaii**	**10**^{10}
Stanford	7
**Arizona State**	**8**
Washington State	4
Lower round 1
**Stanford**	**3**
Washington State	1

Upper final
**Arizona State**	**15**
Hawaii	11
Lower final
**Stanford**	**11**
Hawaii	7

Final
**Arizona State**	**5**	—
Stanford	4	—

== College World Series ==
=== Participants ===
School	Conference	Record (conference)	Head coach	CWS appearances	CWS best finish	CWS record
Arizona State	Pac-10	53–18 (23–7)	Jim Brock	12 (last: 1983)	1st (1965, 1967, 1969, 1977, 1981)	44–19
Cal State Fullerton	SCBA	61–19 (22–6)	Augie Garrido	3 (last: 1982)	1st (1979, 1984)	5–5
Maine	Eastern Collegiate	33–18 (n/a)	John Winkin	5 (last: 1983)	3rd (1964, 1982)	7–10
Miami (FL)	n/a	47–26 (n/a)	Ron Fraser	6 (last: 1982)	1st (1982)	13–10
Michigan	Big 10	43–16 (11–5)	Bud Middaugh	6 (last: 1983)	1st (1953, 1962)	12–10
New Orleans	n/a	45–24 (n/a)	Ron Maestri	0 (last: none)	none	0–0
Oklahoma State	Big 8	58–13 (15–3)	Gary Ward	11 (last: 1983)	1st (1959)	24–21
Texas	SWC	57–12 (16–5)	Cliff Gustafson	21 (last: 1983)	1st (1949, 1950, 1975, 1983)	48–36

=== Results ===
==== Bracket ====
Upper round 1
**Texas**	**6**
New Orleans	3
**Cal State Fullerton**	**8**
Michigan	4
**Arizona State**	**9**
Miami (FL)	6
**Oklahoma State**	**9**
Maine	5

Upper round 2
**Texas**	**6**
Cal State Fullerton	4
**Arizona State**	**23**
Oklahoma State	12
Lower round 1
**New Orleans**	**11**
Michigan	3
**Miami (FL)**	**13**
Maine	7

Upper final
**Texas**	**8**
Arizona State	4
Lower round 2
**Oklahoma State**	**8**^{10}
New Orleans	7
**Cal State Fullerton**	**13**
Miami (FL)	5

Semifinals
Texas	3
**Oklahoma State**	**18**
Arizona State	1
**Cal State Fullerton**	**6**

Preliminary final
Oklahoma State	2
**Cal State Fullerton**	**10**

Final
**Cal State Fullerton**	**3**
Texas	1

==== Game results ====
Date	Game	Winner	Score	Loser	Notes
June 1	Game 1	Texas	6–3	New Orleans	
June 1	Game 2	Cal State Fullerton	8–4	Michigan	
June 2	Game 3	Arizona State	9–6	Miami (FL)	
June 2	Game 4	Oklahoma State	9–5	Maine	
June 3	Game 5	New Orleans	11–3	Michigan	Michigan eliminated
June 3	Game 6	Miami (FL)	13–7	Maine	Maine eliminated
June 4	Game 7	Texas	6–4	Cal State Fullerton	
June 5	Game 8	Arizona State	23–12	Oklahoma State	
June 6	Game 9	Cal State Fullerton	13–5	Miami (FL)	Miami eliminated
June 6	Game 10	Oklahoma State	8–7 (10 innings)	New Orleans	New Orleans eliminated
June 7	Game 11	Texas	8–4	Arizona State	Texas qualified for final
June 8	Game 12	Cal State Fullerton	6–1	Arizona State	Arizona State eliminated
June 8	Game 13	Oklahoma State	18–3	Texas	
June 9	Game 14	Cal State Fullerton	10–2	Oklahoma State	Oklahoma State eliminated
June 10	Final	Cal State Fullerton	3–1	Texas	Cal State Fullerton wins CWS

=== All-Tournament Team ===
The following players were members of the All-Tournament Team.

Position	Player	School
P	Eddie Delzer	Cal State Fullerton
P	Greg Swindell	Texas
C	Bob Caffrey	Cal State Fullerton
1B	Rusty Richards	Texas
2B	Randy Whisler	Oklahoma State
3B	Blaine Larker	Cal State Fullerton
3B	Scott Raziano	New Orleans
SS	Gary Green	Oklahoma State
OF	Barry Bonds	Arizona State
OF	**John Fishel (MOP)**	Cal State Fullerton
OF	Oddibe McDowell	Arizona State
DH	Pete Incaviglia	Oklahoma State

=== Notable players ===
- Arizona State: Chris Beasley, Barry Bonds, Mike Devereaux, Shawn Gilbert, Doug Henry, Oddibe McDowell, Luis Medina, Don Wakamatsu
- Cal State Fullerton: John Fishel, Greg Mathews, José Mota, Shane Turner
- Maine: Mike Bordick, Bill Swift
- Michigan: Scott Kamieniecki, Barry Larkin, Hal Morris, Gary Wayne
- New Orleans: Jim Bullinger, Mark Higgins, Wally Whitehurst
- Oklahoma State: Jeff Bronkey, Doug Dascenzo, Carlos Diaz, John Farrell, Gary Green, Mike Henneman, Pete Incaviglia
- Texas: Billy Bates, Dennis Cook, Rusty Richards, Bruce Ruffin, Greg Swindell

=== Tournament Notes ===
Gary Green and Bill Swift appear in their fourth College World Series. Michigan's appearance was the last for the Big Ten until 2013 when Indiana made the College World Series.

== See also ==
- 1984 NCAA Division I softball tournament
- 1984 NCAA Division II baseball tournament
- 1984 NCAA Division III baseball tournament
- 1984 NAIA World Series
