= Carlos Diaz (catcher) =

American baseball player (born 1964)

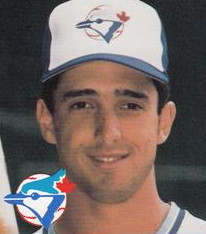
- Diaz in 1988
- Catcher
- Born: December 24, 1964 (age 61); Jersey City, New Jersey, U.S.
- Batted: Right Threw: Right

MLB debut
- May 8, 1990, for the Toronto Blue Jays

Last MLB appearance
- September 28, 1990, for the Toronto Blue Jays

MLB statistics
- Batting average: .333
- Home runs: 0
- Runs batted in: 0
- Stats at Baseball Reference

Teams
- Toronto Blue Jays (1990)

Carlos Francisco Diaz (born December 24, 1964) is an American former Major League Baseball (MLB) catcher. Diaz played for the Toronto Blue Jays in 1990. He batted and threw right-handed.

Diaz attended Oklahoma State University, and in 1984 he played collegiate summer baseball with the Falmouth Commodores of the Cape Cod Baseball League.

He was selected by the Blue Jays in the 14th round of the 1986 MLB draft.
