= Randy Whisler =

American baseball player (born 1962)

- Coach
- Born: June 16, 1962 (age 63); Harbor City, California

Teams
- Cincinnati Reds (2004–2005)

Randy K. Whisler (born June 16, 1962) is an American baseball player and coach. He was a first base coach for the Cincinnati Reds of Major League Baseball in 2004 and 2005.

== Career ==
Whisler attended Klamath Union High School in Klamath Falls, Oregon. He attended Oklahoma State University, where he played college baseball for the Oklahoma State Cowboys as a shortstop and second baseman. With the Cowboys, he played in the College World Series each year from 1982 to 1985. He then played in the Toronto Blue Jays organization as a second baseman for two years.

Whisler became a minor league infield coach in Toronto's organization, before he returned to Oklahoma State. He completed his bachelor's degree and earned a master's degree in athletic administration while serving as an assistant coach for the Cowboys in 1988 and 1989. Whisler joined the Texas Rangers organization as a coach with the Gastonia Rangers of the Single-A South Atlantic League in 1990 and 1991. He coached for the Tulsa Drillers of the Double-A Texas League from 1992 to 1994. In 1995, he became the coach of Edmonds College.

Whisler became the manager of the Arizona League Padres. In 2000, he coached the Las Vegas Stars. He then became the minor league field instructor for the Florida Marlins.

Whisler spent the 2004 and 2005 seasons as the Cincinnati Reds coach. After staying out of professional baseball for a year, he became a coach for the Oklahoma City RedHawks for the 2007 season. He later became the head coach for Victory Christian School in Tulsa.

== Personal life ==
Whisler and his wife, Mary, have three children. They settled in Broken Arrow, Oklahoma.
