= 1984 NCAA Division I baseball rankings =

1984 NCAA Division I baseball season

Tournament

College World Series
- Champions: Cal State Fullerton
- Runners-up: Texas
- MOP: John Fishel (Cal State Fullerton)

Seasons
- ← 1983 1985 →

The following polls make up the 1984 NCAA Division I baseball rankings. Baseball America began publishing its poll of the top 20 teams in college baseball in 1981. Collegiate Baseball Newspaper published its first human poll of the top 20 teams in college baseball in 1957, and expanded to rank the top 30 teams in 1961.

== Baseball America ==
Currently, only the final poll from the 1984 season is available.

Rank	Team
1	Cal State Fullerton
2	Arizona State
3	Texas
4	Oklahoma State
5	San Diego State
6	Fresno State
7	Mississippi State
8	Hawaii
9	Southern California
10	New Orleans
11	North Carolina
12	Florida
13	Oklahoma
14	South Alabama
15	Miami (FL)
16	Maine
17	Texas A&M
18	Stetson
19	Rice
20	Michigan

== Collegiate Baseball ==
Currently, only the final poll from the 1984 season is available.

Rank	Team
1	Cal State Fullerton
2	Texas
3	Oklahoma State
4	Arizona State
5	Miami (FL)
6	New Orleans
7	Michigan
8	Maine
9	San Diego State
10	Mississippi State
11	South Alabama
12	Stanford
13	Hawaii
14	Fresno State
15	Lamar
16	Oklahoma City
17	Seton Hall
18	Central Michigan
19	Texas A&M
20	East Carolina
21	South Carolina
22	North Carolina
23	UNLV
24	Southern California
25	Harvard
26	Oklahoma
27	Stetson
28	Florida
29	Nebraska
30	Indiana State
