= John Fishel =

American baseball player (born 1962)

- Left Fielder
- Born: November 8, 1962 (age 63); Fullerton, California, U.S.
- Batted: Right Threw: Right

MLB debut
- July 14, 1988, for the Houston Astros

Last MLB appearance
- October 2, 1988, for the Houston Astros

MLB statistics
- Batting average: .231
- Home runs: 1
- Runs batted in: 2
- Stats at Baseball Reference

Teams
- Houston Astros (1988)
Medals
Baseball
Representing United States
Pan American Games
Bronze medal – third place	1983 Caracas	Team

John Alan Fishel (born November 8, 1962) is an American former right-handed Major League Baseball left fielder who played for the Houston Astros in 1988.

Fishel played college baseball for the Cal State Fullerton Titans. He was named the Most Outstanding Player of the 1984 College World Series as a junior outfielder.

Fishel was originally drafted by the New York Yankees in the eighth round of the 1981 draft, but he chose not to sign. In 1984, he was drafted by the Oakland Athletics in the 19th round of the draft, but again, he did not sign. Finally, when he was drafted by the Houston Astros in the ninth round of the 1985 draft by the Astros, he did sign.

In 1985, he began his professional career with the Auburn Astros, with whom he hit .261 with nine home runs and 42 RBI in 268 at-bats. He played for the Osceola Astros in 1986, hitting .269 with 12 home runs, 83 RBI and 17 stolen bases in 490 at-bats. With the Columbus Astros in 1987, he hit .276 with 24 home runs and 88 RBI in 457 at-bats.

Fishel began the 1988 season with the Tucson Toros in 1988, and he hit .261 with 18 home runs and 68 RBI in 360 at-bats with them. On July 14, he made his MLB debut, against pitcher Bruce Ruffin of the Philadelphia Phillies. Pinch-hitting for pitcher Mike Scott, Fishel grounded out in his first and only at-bat of the game. Overall, he would hit .231 in 26 big league at-bats in his only season in the majors. He appeared in 19 major league games, hitting one home run with two RBI. The home run was perhaps the biggest highlight of his big league career. It was against pitcher Steve Peters of the St. Louis Cardinals on September 3. He played his final big league game on October 2.

Although his big league career was done, his professional career was not. On January 10, 1989, Fishel was traded by the Astros with minor leaguers Mike Hook and Pedro DeLeon to the Yankees for Rick Rhoden. He played for the Columbus Clippers in both 1989 and 1990, which was his final professional season. In 1989, he hit .218 with six home runs and 31 RBI, and in 1990 he hit .200 with three home runs and 21 RBI.

Overall, Fishel hit .231 with 72 home runs and 333 RBI in his six-year minor league career.

Fishel was a replacement player with the California Angels in spring training in 1995 during the ongoing players' strike.
