= Arizona Wildcats baseball statistical leaders =

The Arizona Wildcats baseball statistical leaders are individual statistical leaders of the Arizona Wildcats baseball program in various categories, including batting average, home runs, runs batted in, runs, hits, stolen bases, ERA, and Strikeouts. Within those areas, the lists identify single-game, single-season, and career leaders. The Wildcats represent the University of Arizona in the NCAA's Big 12 Conference.

Arizona began competing in intercollegiate baseball in 1904. These lists are updated through the end of the 2025 season.

== Batting Average ==
Career (min. 200 AB)
Rk	Player	AVG	Seasons
1	Marty Hurd	.412	1957 1958
2	John Glenn	.406	1970 1971 1972
3	Lloyd Jenney	.399	1950 1951 1952
4	Brad Mills	.394	1978 1979
5	Steve Mikulic	.393	1970 1971
6	Joe Skaisgir	.391	1961 1962
7	Dave Stegman	.390	1973 1974 1975 1976
8	Don McGinnis	.390	1955 1956
9	Tom Clarkson	.383	1955 1956 1957
10	Marv Thompson	.383	1973 1974

Season
Rk	Player	AVG	Season
1	Lloyd Jenney	.484	1952
2	Marty Hurd	.473	1957
3	John Glenn	.438	1972
4	Brad Mills	.435	1978
5	Tom Clarkson	.434	1957
6	Dillon Baird	.433	2009
7	Dave Stegman	.425	1976
	Joe Skaisgir	.425	1961
9	Ron Hassey	.421	1974
10	Jeff Van Houten	.413	2003

== Home Runs ==
Career
Rk	Player	HR	Seasons
1	Shelley Duncan	55	1999 2000 2001
2	Mason White	49	2023 2024 2025
3	Brad Glenn	43	2006 2007 2008 2009
4	Chase Davis	39	2021 2022 2023
5	Kenny Corley	36	1995 1996 1997 1998
6	Nick Quintana	35	2017 2018 2019
7	David Shermet	34	1985 1986 1987 1988
8	Les Pearsey	33	1975 1976 1977 1978
	C.J. Zeigler	33	2007 2008
10	Moises Duran	32	2001 2002 2003 2004

Season
Rk	Player	HR	Season
1	Shelley Duncan	24	2001
2	George Arias	23	1993
3	Chase Davis	21	2023
	Kiko Romero	21	2023
5	Mason White	20	2025
	Jason Thompson	20	1993
	Shelley Duncan	20	1999
	C.J. Zeigler	20	2008
9	Mason White	19	2024
10	Chase Davis	18	2022
	Gary Alexander	18	1987
	Alan Zinter	18	1989

Single Game
Rk	Player	HR	Season	Opponent
1	Dennis Haines	3	1972	Texas-El Paso
	Ron Hassey	3	1974	Weber State
	Erik Torres	3	2000	Washington
	Shelley Duncan	3	2001	Utah
	Brad Glenn	3	2007	Utah Valley State
	Dillon Baird	3	2008	USC
	C.J. Ziegler	3	2008	Utah Valley State
	Emilio Corona	3	2023	Oregon State

== Runs Batted In ==
Career
Rk	Player	RBI	Seasons
1	Ron Hassey	235	1973 1974 1975 1976
2	Jeff Van Houten	213	2002 2003 2004 2005
3	Terry Francona	200	1978 1979 1980
4	Dave Stegman	198	1973 1974 1975 1976
5	Brad Glenn	190	2006 2007 2008 2009
6	Todd Trafton	187	1983 1984 1985 1986
7	Shelley Duncan	186	1999 2000 2001
8	Robbie Moen	185	1990 1991 1992 1993
9	Kenny Corley	183	1995 1996 1997 1998

Season
Rk	Player	RBI	Season
1	Kiko Romero	89	2023
2	Ron Hassey	86	1974
3	Ron Hassey	84	1976
	Terry Francona	84	1980
5	Terry Francona	81	1979
	Alan Zinter	81	1989
7	Mike Senne	80	1986
	Jordan Brown	80	2005
9	Shelley Duncan	78	2001
10	Nick Quintana	77	2019

Single Game
Rk	Player	RBI	Season	Opponent
1	Dave Stegman	11	1974	Texas-El Paso

== Runs ==
Career
Rk	Player	R	Seasons
1	Dave Stegman	287	1973 1974 1975 1976
2	Chip Hale	246	1984 1985 1986 1987
3	Les Pearsey	220	1975 1976 1977 1978
4	Brad Boyer	218	2003 2004 2005 2006
5	Jeff Van Houten	199	2002 2003 2004 2005
6	David Shermet	190	1985 1986 1987 1988
7	Dwight Taylor	189	1979 1980 1981
8	Damon Mashore	186	1989 1990 1991
9	Charles Shoemaker	182	1959 1960 1961
10	Donta' Williams	181	2018 2019 2020 2021

Season
Rk	Player	R	Season
1	Dave Stegman	91	1976
2	Dave Stegman	90	1975
3	John Tejcek	85	1993
4	Ben Heise	84	1974
5	Tommy Hinzo	83	1986
	Trevor Crowe	83	2005
7	Dwight Taylor	82	1980
	Chip Hale	82	1986
9	Donta' Williams	81	2021
	Dave Stegman	81	1974

Single Game
Rk	Player	R	Season	Opponent
1	Cliff Myrick	6	1951	Colorado
	Brad Boyer	6	2003	Sac State

== Hits ==
Career
Rk	Player	H	Seasons
1	Chip Hale	337	1984 1985 1986 1987
2	Dave Stegman	321	1973 1974 1975 1976
3	Robbie Moen	315	1990 1991 1992 1993
4	Zach Gibbons	291	2013 2014 2015 2016
5	Jeff Van Houten	288	2002 2003 2004 2005
6	Terry Francona	271	1978 1979 1980
7	Les Pearsey	269	1975 1976 1977 1978
8	Brad Boyer	265	2003 2004 2005 2006
9	John Tejcek	264	1990 1991 1992 1993
10	Todd Trafton	255	1983 1984 1985 1986

Season
Rk	Player	H	Season
1	Dave Stegman	111	1976
2	Zach Gibbons	107	2016
3	Trevor Crowe	106	2005
4	Terry Francona	105	1980
5	Terry Francona	104	1979
	Todd Trafton	104	1985
7	Clark Crist	103	1979
8	Robbie Moen	102	1993
	Cody Ramer	102	2016
10	Daniel Susac	100	2022

Single Game
Rk	Player	H	Season	Opponent
1	7 times	6	Most recent: Brendan Summerhill, 2024 vs. Utah Tech	

== Stolen Bases ==
Career
Rk	Player	SB	Seasons
1	Dwight Taylor	90	1979 1980 1981
2	Tommy Hinzo	88	1985 1986
3	Dave Stegman	86	1973 1974 1975 1976
4	Brad Boyer	73	2003 2004 2005 2006
5	Hugh McMullan	67	1952 1953 1954
	Damon Mashore	67	1989 1990 1991
7	Trevor Crowe	66	2003 2004 2005
8	Bryce Ortega	64	2008 2009 2010 2011
9	Russ Gragg	63	1952 1953 1954 1955
	John Moses	63	1979 1980

Season
Rk	Player	SB	Season
1	Tommy Hinzo	45	1986
2	Tommy Hinzo	43	1985
3	Dwight Taylor	42	1980
4	John Moses	37	1980
5	Dave Stegman	36	1975
6	Dwight Taylor	34	1981
7	Mike Senne	32	1986
8	Hugh McMullan	31	1952
9	Russ Gragg	30	1955
	Brandon Dixon	30	2013

Single Game
Rk	Player	SB	Season	Opponent
1	12 times	4	Most recent: T.J. Steele, 2008 vs. Washington State	

== Earned Run Average ==
Career (min. 100 IP)
Rk	Player	ERA	Seasons
1	Dan Schneider	1.30	1962
2	Don Lee	1.77	1954 1955 1956
3	Rich Hinton	1.84	1967 1968 1969
4	Jim Nichols	2.04	1963 1964 1965
5	Pat O'Brien	2.06	1966 1967 1968
6	Tim Plodinec	2.12	1967 1968
7	Steve Powers	2.14	1974 1975 1976
8	John Fouse	2.31	1963 1965
9	Carl Thomas	2.32	1954 1955 1956
10	Gordon Bergthold	2.36	1960 1961

Season (min. 50 IP/1 IP per team game)
Rk	Player	ERA	Season
1	Rich Hinton	1.07	1969
2	Don Lee	1.14	1956
3	Pat O'Brien	1.25	1966
4	Dan Schneider	1.30	1962
5	Jim Nichols	1.35	1965
6	Leon Hooten	1.40	1969
7	Ben Rincon	1.53	1955
8	Steve Powers	1.61	1975
9	Gordon Bergthold	1.66	1960
10	Pat O'Brien	1.73	1967

== Strikeouts ==
Career
Rk	Player	K	Seasons
1	Carl Thomas	422	1954 1955 1956
2	Preston Guilmet	419	2006 2007 2008 2009
3	Don Lee	394	1954 1955 1956
4	Kurt Heyer	356	2010 2011 2012
5	Jim Nichols	333	1963 1964 1965
6	David Baldwin	312	1957 1958 1959
7	Joe Magrane	307	1983 1984 1985
8	Lance Dickson	304	1988 1989 1990
9	Rich Hinton	300	1967 1968 1969
10	Jim Ward	292	1958 1959 1960

Season
Rk	Player	K	Season
1	Dan Schneider	186	1962
2	Carl Thomas	179	1956
3	Don Lee	161	1956
4	Carl Thomas	146	1954
	Preston Guilmet	146	2007
6	Jim Nichols	145	1963
7	David Baldwin	143	1959
8	Lance Dickson	141	1990
9	Jim Ward	136	1960
10	Kurt Heyer	134	2011

Single Game
Rk	Player	K	Season	Opponent
1	Ken Heist	21	1940	New Mexico
2	Dan Schneider	20	1962	Utah
	Leon Hooten	20	1969	New Mexico
