= 1991 Arizona Wildcats baseball team =

American college baseball season

1991 Arizona Wildcats baseball
- Conference: Pacific-10 Conference
- Record: 27–32 (10–20 Pac-10)
- Head coach: Jerry Kindall (19th season)
- Assistant coaches: Jerry Stitt (13th season); Jim Wing (19th season)
- Home stadium: Sancet Stadium

1991 Pacific-10 Conference baseball standings
	Conf.				Overall
Team	W		L	PCT	W		L	PCT
Northern
Washington State ^{x}‍‍‍	14	–	6	.700	37	–	25	.597
Oregon State ‍‍‍	12	–	8	.600	28	–	20	.583
Portland ‍‍‍	11	–	9	.550	32	–	19	.627
Gonzaga ‍‍‍	8	–	12	.400	23	–	25	.479
Washington ‍‍‍	8	–	12	.400	39	–	21	.650
Portland State ‍‍‍	7	–	13	.350	29	–	24	.547
Southern
No. 7 Southern California ^{x}‍‍‍^{y}	23	–	7	.767	46	–	17	.730
No. 15 Stanford ‍‍‍^{y}	18	–	12	.600	39	–	23	.629
No. 23 California ‍‍‍^{y}	14	–	16	.467	35	–	28	.556
UCLA ‍‍‍	14	–	16	.467	37	–	27	.578
Arizona State ‍‍‍	12	–	18	.400	35	–	27	.565
Arizona ‍‍‍	10	–	20	.333	27	–	32	.458
x – Division champion y – Invited to the NCAA tournament As of June 30, 1991; Rankings from Collegiate Baseball

The 1991 Arizona Wildcats baseball team represented the University of Arizona during the 1991 NCAA Division I baseball season. The Wildcats played their home games at Frank Sancet Stadium. The team was coached by Jerry Kindall in his 19th season at Arizona. The Wildcats finished 27-32 overall and placed 6th in the Pacific-10's Southern Division with an 10–20 record. Arizona missed the postseason for a 2nd straight season for the first time since missing 4 straight postseasons from 1981 to 1984.

== Previous season ==
The Wildcats finished the 1990 season with a record of 26-34 and 11–19 in conference play, finishing 5th in the "Six-Pac" (Pac-10 Southern). Arizona would miss the postseason and would finish with their first losing record since 1984.

== Personnel ==
=== Roster ===
1991 Arizona Wildcats baseball roster
• Tony Bouie • Phil Echeverria • Matt Figueroa • Jason Hisey • Barry Johnson • Jack Johnson	• Marc Lavoie • R.D. Long • Joey Martinez • Damon Mashore • Robert Moen • Willie Morales • J.J. Northam	• Ron Oelschlager • Billy Owens • Andy Vincent • Carlos Rico • Paul Sancedo • Tim Schweitzer • John Tejcek

=== Coaches ===
1991 Arizona Wildcats baseball coaching staff
- Jerry Kindall - Head coach
- Jerry Stitt - Assistant coach
- Jim Wing - Assistant coach

== 1991 Schedule and results ==
1991 Arizona Wildcats baseball game log
Regular season
Date	Opponent	Site/Stadium	Score	Overall Record	Pac-10 Record
Jan 26	New Mexico	Sancet Stadium • Tucson, AZ	L 3-5	0-1	
Jan 27	New Mexico	Sancet Stadium • Tucson, AZ	W 13-7	1-1	
Jan 28	New Mexico	Sancet Stadium • Tucson, AZ	W 7-6	2-1	
Jan 29	Cal State Dominguez Hills	Sancet Stadium • Tucson, AZ	W 12-6	3-1	
Jan 30	Cal State Dominguez Hills	Sancet Stadium • Tucson, AZ	W 10-6	4-1	
Jan 31	Pepperdine	Sancet Stadium • Tucson, AZ	W 4-3	5-1	
Feb 1	Pepperdine	Sancet Stadium • Tucson, AZ	L 1-7	5-2	
Feb 2	Pepperdine	Sancet Stadium • Tucson, AZ	L 0-15	5-3	
Feb 7	at Cal State Fullerton	Amerige Park • Fullerton, CA	W 15-1	6-3	
Feb 8	at Cal State Fullerton	Amerige Park • Fullerton, CA	L 2-7	6-4	
Feb 9	at Cal State Fullerton	Amerige Park • Fullerton, CA	L 4-5	6-5	
Feb 13	UC Santa Barbara	Sancet Stadium • Tucson, AZ	W 16-11	7-5	
Feb 13	UC Santa Barbara	Sancet Stadium • Tucson, AZ	L 6-9	7-6	
Feb 14	Florida State	Sancet Stadium • Tucson, AZ	L 8-15	7-7	
Feb 15	Florida State	Sancet Stadium • Tucson, AZ	W 7-3	8-7	
Feb 16	Florida State	Sancet Stadium • Tucson, AZ	W 3-2	9-7	
Feb 19	Cal State Northridge	Sancet Stadium • Tucson, AZ	L 4-8	9-8	
Feb 20	Cal State Northridge	Sancet Stadium • Tucson, AZ	L 1-7	9-9	
Feb 22	USC	Sancet Stadium • Tucson, AZ	W 14-11	10-9	1-0
Feb 23	USC	Sancet Stadium • Tucson, AZ	L 10-11	10-10	1-1
Feb 24	USC	Sancet Stadium • Tucson, AZ	L 6-18	10-11	1-2
Feb 26	New Mexico State	Sancet Stadium • Tucson, AZ	W 12-7	11-11	
Feb 27	New Mexico State	Sancet Stadium • Tucson, AZ	W 13-2	12-11	
Mar 2	at Stanford	Sunken Diamond • Palo Alto, CA	L 3-4	12-12	1-3
Mar 8	at UCLA	Jackie Robinson Stadium • Los Angeles, CA	L 1-3	12-13	1-4
Mar 9	at UCLA	Jackie Robinson Stadium • Los Angeles, CA	L 9-11	12-14	1-5
Mar 10	at UCLA	Jackie Robinson Stadium • Los Angeles, CA	L 4-16	12-15	1-6
Mar 12	Kentucky	Sancet Stadium • Tucson, AZ	L 4-5	12-16	
Mar 13	Kentucky	Sancet Stadium • Tucson, AZ	W 24-0	13-16	
Mar 16	at Texas A&M	Olsen Field • College Station, TX	W 5-1	14-16	
Mar 16	at Texas A&M	Olsen Field • College Station, TX	L 3-4	14-17	
Mar 17	at Texas A&M	Olsen Field • College Station, TX	L 2-6	14-18	
Mar 22	Arizona State	Sancet Stadium • Tucson, AZ	W 9-8	15-18	2-6
Mar 23	Arizona State	Sancet Stadium • Tucson, AZ	L 3-7	15-19	2-7
Mar 24	Arizona State	Sancet Stadium • Tucson, AZ	W 16-3	16-19	3-7
Mar 29	California	Sancet Stadium • Tucson, AZ	L 10-18	16-20	3-8
Mar 29	California	Sancet Stadium • Tucson, AZ	W 14-2	17-20	4-8
Mar 30	California	Sancet Stadium • Tucson, AZ	L 9-10	17-21	4-9
Apr 2	Saint Francis (NY)	Sancet Stadium • Tucson, AZ	W 26-7	18-21	
Apr 5	UCLA	Sancet Stadium • Tucson, AZ	W 17-8	19-21	5-9
Apr 6	UCLA	Sancet Stadium • Tucson, AZ	W 15-14	20-21	6-9
Apr 7	UCLA	Sancet Stadium • Tucson, AZ	W 11-9	21-21	7-9
Apr 9	at Grand Canyon	Brazell Stadium • Phoenix, AZ	W 7-2	22-21	
Apr 12	at USC	Dedeaux Field • Los Angeles, CA	L 4-6	22-22	7-10
Apr 13	at USC	Dedeaux Field • Los Angeles, CA	L 7-8	22-23	7-11
Apr 14	at USC	Dedeaux Field • Los Angeles, CA	L 4-8	22-24	7-12
Apr 19	at California	Evans Diamond • Berkeley, CA	W 11-9	23-24	8-12
Apr 20	at California	Evans Diamond • Berkeley, CA	L 5-16	23-25	8-13
Apr 21	at California	Evans Diamond • Berkeley, CA	L 9-11	23-26	8-14
Apr 22	at Stanford	Sunken Diamond • Palo Alto, CA	L 1-2	23-27	8-15
Apr 22	at Stanford	Sunken Diamond • Palo Alto, CA	L 1-6	23-28	8-16
Apr 26	Stanford	Sancet Stadium • Tucson, AZ	W 7-3	24-28	9-16
Apr 27	Stanford	Sancet Stadium • Tucson, AZ	L 7-13	24-29	9-17
Apr 28	Stanford	Sancet Stadium • Tucson, AZ	W 21-11	25-29	10-17
May 3	Grand Canyon	Sancet Stadium • Tucson, AZ	W 10-6	26-29	
May 4	Grand Canyon	Sancet Stadium • Tucson, AZ	W 7-5	27-29	
May 10	at Arizona State	Packard Stadium • Tempe, AZ	L 4-8	27-30	10-18
May 11	at Arizona State	Packard Stadium • Tempe, AZ	L 2-3	27-31	10-19
May 12	at Arizona State	Packard Stadium • Tempe, AZ	L 8-9	27-32	10-20

== 1991 MLB draft ==
Player	Position	Round	Overall	MLB team
Damon Mashore	OF	9	255	Oakland Athletics
Jason Hisey	RHP	20	519	St. Louis Cardinals
Todd Ingram	RHP	21	567	Oakland Athletics
Jack Johnson	C	30	793	Los Angeles Dodgers
