= 2003 Arizona Wildcats baseball team =

American college baseball season

2003 Arizona Wildcats baseball

Fullerton Regional
- Conference: Pacific-10 Conference
- CB: No. 25
- Record: 35-23 (13-11 Pac-10)
- Head coach: Andy Lopez (2nd season)
- Assistant coaches: Mark Wasikowski (2nd season); Jeff Casper (2nd season); Steve Kling (2nd season)
- Home stadium: Sancet Stadium

2003 Pacific-10 Conference baseball standings
	Conf.				Overall
Team	W		L	PCT	W		L	PCT
No. 2 Stanford ‍†‍‍^{y}	18	–	6	.750	51	–	18	.739
No. 10 Arizona State ‍‍‍^{y}	16	–	8	.667	54	–	14	.794
No. 27 Washington ‍‍‍^{y}	15	–	9	.625	42	–	48	.467
Arizona ‍‍‍^{y}	13	–	11	.542	35	–	23	.603
Southern California ‍‍‍	11	–	13	.458	28	–	28	.500
UCLA ‍‍‍	11	–	13	.458	28	–	31	.475
California ‍‍‍	10	–	14	.417	28	–	27	.509
Oregon State ‍‍‍	7	–	17	.292	25	–	28	.472
Washington State ‍‍‍	7	–	17	.292	19	–	37	.339
† – Conference champion y – Invited to the NCAA tournament As of June 30, 2003; Rankings from Collegiate Baseball

The 2003 Arizona Wildcats baseball team represented the University of Arizona during the 2003 NCAA Division I baseball season. The Wildcats played their home games at Frank Sancet Stadium. The team was coached by Andy Lopez in his 2nd season at Arizona. The Wildcats finished with a record of 35-23 (13-11 Conf.) and were selected to the NCAA tournament for the 1st time under Andy Lopez and 1st time since 1999, losing in the Fullerton Regional to the San Diego Toreros.

== Previous season ==
The Wildcats finished the 2002 season with a record of 31-24 (9-15 Conf.). Arizona missed the postseason for a 3rd straight year and 8th time in the previous decade.

== Personnel ==
=== Roster ===
2003 Arizona Wildcats baseball roster
Pitchers • 4 - Derek Rodriguez - Junior • 11 - Joe Little - Junior • 12 - Sean Rierson - Junior • 14 - Brian Pemble - Senior • 22 - Mark Worrell - Sophomore • 24 - Chris Goodman - Junior • 25 - Pat Lawler - Freshman • 26 - Richie Gardner - Junior • 29 - Scott Burns - Junior • 36 - Kevin Guyette - Sophomore • 45 - Wes Zlotoff - Senior • 48 - Jon Meloan - Freshman	Catchers • 13 - Nick Hundley - Freshman • 33 - Richard Mercado - Sophomore Infielders • 1 - Brad Boyer - Freshman • 2 - Lee Franklin - Freshman • 3 - Moises Duran - Junior • 17 - Pat Reilly - Junior • 34 - John Hardy - Sophomore • 35 - Jordan Brown - Freshman • 42 - Joe Frazier - Sophomore • Kris Sanchez - Redshirt	Outfielders • 10 - Trevor Crowe - Freshman • 16 - Jeff Van Houten - Sophomore • 18 - Terrence Taylor - Junior • 21 - Chris Frey - Freshman • 27 - Brian Anderson - Junior • 28 - Derek Decater - Freshman • 38 - Chipper Crum - Junior • 47 - Dallas Haught - Junior

=== Coaches ===
2003 Arizona Wildcats baseball coaching staff
- Andy Lopez - Head coach
- Mark Wasikowski - Assistant coach
- Jeff Casper - Assistant coach
- Steve Kling - Volunteer Assistant Coach

=== Opening day ===
Opening Day Starters
Name	Position
Brad Boyer	Left fielder
Trevor Crowe	Third baseman
Moises Duran	Second baseman
Brian Anderson	Designated hitter
John Hardy	Shortstop
Pat Reilly	First baseman
Nick Hundley	Catcher
Dallas Haught	Center fielder
Jeff Van Houten	Right fielder
Joe Little	Starting pitcher

== Schedule and results ==
2003 Arizona Wildcats baseball game log
Regular season
Date	Opponent	Rank	Site/stadium	Score	Win/Loss	Overall Record	Pac-10 Record
Jan 30	BYU		Sancet Stadium • Tucson, AZ	L 3-6	Little (0-1)	0-1	
Jan 31	BYU		Sancet Stadium • Tucson, AZ	W 17-13	Meloan (1-0)	1-1	
Feb 1	BYU		Sancet Stadium • Tucson, AZ	W 32-3	Gardner (1-0)	2-1	
Feb 7	#17 Baylor		Sancet Stadium • Tucson, AZ	W 7-4	Little (1-1)	3-1	
Feb 8	#17 Baylor		Sancet Stadium • Tucson, AZ	L 10-12	Worrell (0-1)	3-2	
Feb 9	#17 Baylor		Sancet Stadium • Tucson, AZ	L 9-11	Rodriguez (0-1)	3-3	
Feb 14	at UC Irvine		Anteater Ballpark • Irvine, CA	W 3-0	Little (2-1)	4-3	
Feb 15	at UC Irvine		Anteater Ballpark • Irvine, CA	W 6-0	Rierson (1-0)	5-3	
Feb 16	at UC Irvine		Anteater Ballpark • Irvine, CA	W 7-1	Gardner (2-0)	6-3	
Feb 21	Minnesota		Sancet Stadium • Tucson, AZ	L 10-13	Little (2-2)	6-4	
Feb 22	Minnesota		Sancet Stadium • Tucson, AZ	W 11-5	Rierson (2-0)	7-4	
Feb 23	Minnesota		Sancet Stadium • Tucson, AZ	W 7-2	Gardner (3-0)	8-4	
Feb 24	Oklahoma State		Sancet Stadium • Tucson, AZ	W 7-4	Little (3-2)	9-4	
Feb 28	#16 Texas A&M		Sancet Stadium • Tucson, AZ	W 11-0	Rierson (3-0)	10-4	
Mar 1	#16 Texas A&M		Sancet Stadium • Tucson, AZ	L 8-11	Worrell (0-2)	10-5	
Mar 2	#16 Texas A&M		Sancet Stadium • Tucson, AZ	W 17-1	Guyette (1-0)	11-5	
Mar 7	at #11 Texas	#21	Disch-Falk Field • Austin, TX	W 5-1	Rierson (4-0)	12-5	
Mar 8	at #11 Texas	#21	Disch-Falk Field • Austin, TX	L 2-3	Rodriguez (0-2)	12-6	
Mar 9	at #11 Texas	#21	Disch-Falk Field • Austin, TX	L 1-4	Guyette (1-1)	12-7	
Mar 11	Portland	#21	Sancet Stadium • Tucson, AZ	W 19-5	Worrell (1-2)	13-7	
Mar 12	Portland	#21	Sancet Stadium • Tucson, AZ	W 15-12	Zlotoff (1-0)	14-7	
Mar 13	Wagner	#21	Sancet Stadium • Tucson, AZ	W 15-0	Gardner (4-0)	15-7	
Mar 14	Wagner	#21	Sancet Stadium • Tucson, AZ	W 20-0	Little (4-2)	16-7	
Mar 15	Wagner	#21	Sancet Stadium • Tucson, AZ	W 13-1	Guyette (2-1)	17-7	
Mar 18	vs New Mexico	#20	War Memorial Stadium • Nogales, AZ	W 5-3	Gardner (5-0)	18-7	
Mar 19	New Mexico	#20	Sancet Stadium • Tucson, AZ	W 8-3	Meloan (2-0)	19-7	
Mar 21	USC	#20	Sancet Stadium • Tucson, AZ	L 2-12	Rierson (4-1)	19-8	0-1
Mar 22	USC	#20	Sancet Stadium • Tucson, AZ	W 6-5	Pemble (1-0)	20-8	1-1
Mar 23	USC	#20	Sancet Stadium • Tucson, AZ	W 16-3	Gardner (6-0)	21-8	2-1
Mar 28	at UCLA	#17	Jackie Robinson Stadium • Los Angeles, CA	L 4-6	Worrell (1-3)	21-9	2-2
Mar 29	at UCLA	#17	Jackie Robinson Stadium • Los Angeles, CA	L 5-7	Gardner (6-1)	21-10	2-3
Mar 30	at UCLA	#17	Jackie Robinson Stadium • Los Angeles, CA	W 12-10	Rierson (5-1)	22-10	3-3
Apr 4	Miami (OH)	#21	Sancet Stadium • Tucson, AZ	W 11-10	Pemble (2-0)	23-10	
Apr 5	Miami (OH)	#21	Sancet Stadium • Tucson, AZ	L 4-9	Guyette (2-2)	23-11	
Apr 6	Miami (OH)	#21	Sancet Stadium • Tucson, AZ	W 9-4	Rierson (6-1)	24-11	
Apr 11	Washington		Sancet Stadium • Tucson, AZ	L 3-4	Pemble (2-1)	24-12	3-4
Apr 12	Washington		Sancet Stadium • Tucson, AZ	W 13-4	Rierson (7-1)	25-12	4-4
Apr 13	Washington		Sancet Stadium • Tucson, AZ	W 9-4	Meloan (3-0)	26-12	5-4
Apr 14	Sacramento State	#25	Sancet Stadium • Tucson, AZ	L 11-12	Pemble (2-2)	26-13	
Apr 17	at Washington State	#25	Bailey-Brayton Field • Pullman, WA	W 11-9	Meloan (4-0)	27-13	6-4
Apr 18	at Washington State	#25	Bailey-Brayton Field • Pullman, WA	W 6-4	Worrell (2-3)	28-13	7-4
Apr 19	at Washington State	#25	Bailey-Brayton Field • Pullman, WA	L 8-12	Guyette (2-3)	28-14	7-5
Apr 22	at Grand Canyon		Brazell Stadium • Phoenix, AZ	L 0-4	Little (4-3)	28-15	
Apr 25	at #3 Stanford		Sunken Diamond • Palo Alto, CA	W 4-3	Gardner (7-1)	29-15	8-5
Apr 26	at #3 Stanford		Sunken Diamond • Palo Alto, CA	L 9-10	Pemble (2-3)	29-16	8-6
Apr 27	at #3 Stanford		Sunken Diamond • Palo Alto, CA	W 11-6	Guyette (3-3)	30-16	9-6
Apr 28	at Sacramento State	#20	Hornet Field • Sacramento, CA	W 21-13	Pemble (3-3)	31-16	
May 2	California	#20	Sancet Stadium • Tucson, AZ	W 9-5	Gardner (8-1)	32-16	10-6
May 3	California	#20	Sancet Stadium • Tucson, AZ	W 10-4	Rierson (8-1)	33-16	11-6
May 4	California	#20	Sancet Stadium • Tucson, AZ	L 7-12	Meloan (4-1)	33-17	11-7
May 17	Oregon State	#19	Sancet Stadium • Tucson, AZ	W 20-6	Gardner (9-1)	34-17	12-7
May 18	Oregon State	#19	Sancet Stadium • Tucson, AZ	W 9-4	Rierson (9-1)	35-17	13-7
May 19	Oregon State	#19	Sancet Stadium • Tucson, AZ	L 12-13	Worrell (2-4)	35-18	13-8
May 23	at #4 Arizona State	#15	Packard Stadium • Tempe, AZ	L 2-5	Gardner (9-2)	35-19	13-9
May 24	at #4 Arizona State	#15	Packard Stadium • Tempe, AZ	L 0-16	Rierson (9-2)	35-20	13-10
May 25	at #4 Arizona State	#15	Packard Stadium • Tempe, AZ	L 2-15	Little (4-4)	35-21	13-11
NCAA Fullerton Regional
May 30	vs (3) Notre Dame	(2) #25	Goodwin Field • Fullerton, CA	L 5-13	Gardner (9-3)	35-22	
May 31	vs (4) San Diego	(2) #25	Goodwin Field • Fullerton, CA	L 2-5	Rierson (9-3)	35-23	

=== Fullerton Regional ===
Fullerton Regional Teams
(1) Cal State Fullerton Titans	(4) San Diego Toreros	(2) Arizona Wildcats	(3) Notre Dame Fighting Irish

== 2003 MLB draft ==
Player	Position	Round	Overall	MLB team
Brian Anderson	OF	1	15	Chicago White Sox
Richie Gardner	RHP	6	171	Cincinnati Reds
Joe Little	LHP	26	758	Tampa Bay Devil Rays
Clarence Farmer	OF	49	1450	Los Angeles Dodgers
Sean Rierson	RHP	50	1458	San Diego Padres
