= 2006 Arizona Wildcats baseball team =

2006 Arizona Wildcats baseball
- Conference: Pacific-10 Conference
- Head coach: Andy Lopez (6th season)
- Assistant coaches: Mark Wasikowski (6th season); Jeff Casper (6th season); Steve Kling (6th season)
- Home stadium: Sancet Stadium

2006 Pacific-10 Conference baseball standings
	Conf.				Overall
Team	W		L	PCT	W		L	PCT
No. 1 Oregon State ‍†‍‍^{y}	16	–	7	.696	50	–	16	.758
Arizona State ‍‍‍^{y}	14	–	10	.583	37	–	21	.638
UCLA ‍‍‍^{y}	13	–	10	.565	33	–	25	.569
Arizona ‍‍‍	12	–	12	.500	27	–	28	.491
No. 15 Stanford ‍‍‍^{y}	11	–	13	.458	33	–	27	.550
Southern California ‍‍‍	11	–	13	.458	36	–	25	.590
Washington ‍‍‍	11	–	13	.458	36	–	25	.590
Washington State ‍‍‍	10	–	14	.417	36	–	23	.610
California ‍‍‍	9	–	15	.375	26	–	28	.481
† – Conference champion y – Invited to the NCAA tournament As of June 30, 2006; Rankings from Collegiate Baseball

The 2006 Arizona Wildcats baseball team represented the University of Arizona during the 2006 NCAA Division I baseball season. The Wildcats played their home games at Jerry Kindall Field at Frank Sancet Stadium. The team was coached by Andy Lopez in his 5th season at Arizona. The Wildcats finished with a record of 27-28 (12-12 Conf.) They failed to make the postseason for only the 2nd season under Lopez. This would also mark one of only 2 losing seasons Arizona would have under Lopez.

== Previous season ==
The Wildcats finished the 2005 season with a record of 39-21 (17-7 Conf.), advancing to the postseason for the 3rd straight year. They advanced to the Fullerton Regional final where they would lose to host Cal State Fullerton.

== Personnel ==
=== Roster ===
2006 Arizona Wildcats baseball roster
Pitchers • 11 - Preston Guilmet - Freshman • 16 - Mike Colla - Freshman • 18 - Eric Berger - Sophomore • 19 - David Coulon - Sophomore • 24 - Matt Baugh - Sophomore • 25 - Daniel Schlereth - RS Freshman • 26 - Mark Melancon - Junior • 34 - Cory Burns - Freshman • 45 - Ryan Perry - Freshman • 46 - Brad Mills - Junior	Catchers • 5 - Matt Denker - Junior • 17 - Konrad Schmidt - Junior Infielders • 1 - Brad Boyer - Senior • 2 - Colt Sedbrook - Sophomore • 10 - Richard Stout - Freshman • 15 - David Plante - Freshman • 27 - Steve Pearson - Junior • 29 - Travis Peep - Freshman • 36 - Tyson Moll - Junior	Outfielders • 4 - Jason Donald - Junior • 6 - Derek Decater - Senior • 12 - Bill Rhinehart - Junior • 20 - Brad Glenn - Freshman • 28 - Jon Gaston - Freshman • 23 - Jason Sadoian - Junior • 35 - Hunter Pace - Freshman • 42 - Ken Williams - Sophomore • 48 - TJ Steele - Freshman

=== Coaches ===
2006 Arizona Wildcats baseball coaching staff
- Andy Lopez - Head coach
- Mark Wasikowski - Assistant coach
- Jeff Casper - Assistant coach
- Keith Francis - Volunteer Assistant Coach

=== Opening day ===
Opening Day Starters
Name	Position
Brad Boyer	Third baseman
Jason Donald	Shortstop
Steve Pearson	First baseman
Konrad Schmidt	Catcher
David Plante	Designated hitter
Colt Sedbrook	Second baseman
Derek Decatur	Left fielder
TJ Steele	Center fielder
Bill Rhinehart	Right fielder
Eric Berger	Starting pitcher

== Schedule and results ==
2006 Arizona Wildcats baseball game log
Regular season
Date	Opponent	Rank	Site/stadium	Score	Win/Loss	Overall Record	Pac-10 Record
Feb 3	Loyola Marymount		Sancet Stadium • Tucson, AZ	W 10-5	Berger (1-0)	1-0	
Feb 4	Loyola Marymount		Sancet Stadium • Tucson, AZ	W 5-3	Mills (1-0)	2-0	
Feb 5	Loyola Marymount		Sancet Stadium • Tucson, AZ	L 5-12	Coulon (0-1)	2-1	
Feb 10	at UC Riverside		Riverside Sports Complex • Riverside, CA	L 5-8	Berger (1-1)	2-2	
Feb 11	at UC Riverside		Riverside Sports Complex • Riverside, CA	W 4-2	Melancon (1-0)	3-2	
Feb 12	at UC Riverside		Riverside Sports Complex • Riverside, CA	W 11-5	Mills (2-0)	4-2	
Feb 17	New Mexico		Sancet Stadium • Tucson, AZ	L 5-6	Melancon (1-1)	4-3	
Feb 18	New Mexico		Sancet Stadium • Tucson, AZ	L 3-7	Berger (1-2)	4-4	
Feb 19	New Mexico		Sancet Stadium • Tucson, AZ	W 19-16	Perry (1-0)	5-4	
Feb 24	La Salle		Sancet Stadium • Tucson, AZ	W 15-4	Berger (2-2)	6-4	
Feb 25	La Salle		Sancet Stadium • Tucson, AZ	W 15-1	Guilmet (1-0)	7-4	
Feb 26	La Salle		Sancet Stadium • Tucson, AZ	W 3-2	Melancon (2-1)	8-4	
Mar 3	at Minnesota		Hubert H. Humphrey Metrodome • Minneapolis, MN	W 7-2	Berger (3-2)	9-4	
Mar 4	vs #4 Nebraska		Hubert H. Humphrey Metrodome • Minneapolis, MN	L 1-3	Guilmet (1-1)	9-5	
Mar 5	vs Notre Dame		Hubert H. Humphrey Metrodome • Minneapolis, MN	W 2-0	Melancon (3-1)	10-5	
Mar 10	at #18 Mississippi State		Dudy Noble Field • Starkville, MS	L 2-3	Berger (3-3)	10-6	
Mar 11	at #18 Mississippi State		Dudy Noble Field • Starkville, MS	L 2-9	Guilmet (1-2)	10-7	
Mar 12	at #18 Mississippi State		Dudy Noble Field • Starkville, MS	L 4-5	Melancon (3-2)	10-8	
Mar 17	#13 Cal State Fullerton		Sancet Stadium • Tucson, AZ	L 4-6	Berger (3-4)	10-9	
Mar 18	#13 Cal State Fullerton		Sancet Stadium • Tucson, AZ	L 3-5	Guilmet (1-3)	10-10	
Mar 19	#13 Cal State Fullerton		Sancet Stadium • Tucson, AZ	L 3-5	Coulon (0-2)	10-11	
Mar 25	UC Irvine		Sancet Stadium • Tucson, AZ	W 5-1	Guilmet (2-3)	11-11	
Mar 26	UC Irvine		Sancet Stadium • Tucson, AZ	L 1-7	Mills (2-1)	11-12	
Mar 30	at California		Evans Diamond • Berkeley, CA	L 2-3	Guilmet (2-4)	11-13	0-1
Apr 1	at California		Evans Diamond • Berkeley, CA	W 5-1	Mills (3-1)	12-13	1-1
Apr 1	at California		Evans Diamond • Berkeley, CA	L 4-5	Burns (0-1)	12-14	1-2
Apr 2	vs #12 Arizona State		Chase Field • Phoenix, AZ	W 12-8	Schlereth (1-0)	13-14	
Apr 7	at #16 Oregon State		Goss Stadium • Corvallis, OR	L 5-10	Melancon (3-3)	13-15	1-3
Apr 8	at #16 Oregon State		Goss Stadium • Corvallis, OR	L 2-10	Mills (3-2)	13-16	1-4
Apr 9	at #16 Oregon State		Goss Stadium • Corvallis, OR	W 8-1	Coulon (1-2)	14-16	2-4
Apr 13	UCLA		Sancet Stadium • Tucson, AZ	W 4-3	Schlereth (2-0)	15-16	3-4
Apr 14	UCLA		Sancet Stadium • Tucson, AZ	L 8-13	Mills (3-3)	15-17	3-5
Apr 15	UCLA		Sancet Stadium • Tucson, AZ	L 5-8	Coulon (1-3)	15-18	3-6
Apr 18	at New Mexico		Isotopes Park • Albuquerque, NM	L 3-13	Burns (0-2)	15-19	
Apr 21	Stanford		Sancet Stadium • Tucson, AZ	L 6-10	Guilmet (2-5)	15-20	3-7
Apr 22	Stanford		Sancet Stadium • Tucson, AZ	W 14-4	Mills (4-3)	16-20	4-7
Apr 23	Stanford		Sancet Stadium • Tucson, AZ	W 12-3	Coulon (2-3)	17-20	5-7
Apr 25	Southern Utah		Sancet Stadium • Tucson, AZ	W 18-0	Baugh (1-0)	18-20	
Apr 26	Southern Utah		Sancet Stadium • Tucson, AZ	W 7-5	Perry (2-0)	19-20	
Apr 28	at Washington		Husky Ballpark • Seattle, WA	L 5-7	Guilmet (2-6)	19-21	5-8
Apr 29	at Washington		Husky Ballpark • Seattle, WA	W 15-0	Mills (5-3)	20-21	6-8
Apr 30	at Washington		Husky Ballpark • Seattle, WA	L 3-4	Schlereth (2-1)	20-22	6-9
May 2	at #20 Arizona State		Packard Stadium • Tempe, AZ	L 8-22	Perry (2-1)	20-23	
May 5	UNLV		Sancet Stadium • Tucson, AZ	W 7-6	Schlereth (3-1)	21-23	
May 6	UNLV		Sancet Stadium • Tucson, AZ	L 7-15	Mills (5-4)	21-24	
May 7	UNLV		Sancet Stadium • Tucson, AZ	L 12-16	Colla (0-1)	21-25	
May 13	Washington State		Sancet Stadium • Tucson, AZ	W 29-4	Guilmet (3-6)	22-25	7-9
May 14	Washington State		Sancet Stadium • Tucson, AZ	L 3-9	Mills (5-5)	22-26	7-10
May 15	Washington State		Sancet Stadium • Tucson, AZ	L 5-6	Baugh (1-1)	22-27	7-11
May 19	#14 Arizona State		Sancet Stadium • Tucson, AZ	L 6-15	Guilmet (3-7)	22-28	7-12
May 20	#14 Arizona State		Sancet Stadium • Tucson, AZ	W 18-12	Coulon (3-3)	23-28	8-12
May 21	#14 Arizona State		Sancet Stadium • Tucson, AZ	W 5-4	Mills (6-5)	24-28	9-12
May 26	at USC		Dedeaux Field • Los Angeles, CA	W 10-5	Baugh (2-1)	25-28	10-12
May 27	at USC		Dedeaux Field • Los Angeles, CA	W 6-0	Coulon (4-3)	26-28	11-12
May 28	at USC		Dedeaux Field • Los Angeles, CA	W 17-14	Perry (3-1)	27-28	12-12

== 2006 MLB draft ==
Player	Position	Round	Overall	MLB team
Jason Donald	SS	3	97	Philadelphia Phillies
Mark Melancon	RHP	9	284	New York Yankees
Brad Boyer	2B	13	386	San Francisco Giants
Brad Mills	LHP	22	660	Toronto Blue Jays
