= 1990 Arizona Wildcats baseball team =

American college baseball season

1990 Arizona Wildcats baseball
- Conference: Pacific-10 Conference
- Record: 26–34 (11–19 Pac-10)
- Head coach: Jerry Kindall (18th season)
- Assistant coaches: Jerry Stitt (12th season); Jim Wing (18th season)
- Home stadium: Sancet Stadium

1990 Pacific-10 Conference baseball standings
	Conf.				Overall
Team	W		L	PCT	W		L	PCT
Northern
No. 18 Washington State ^{x}‍‍‍^{y}	19	–	5	.792	47	–	19	.712
Oregon State ‍‍‍	15	–	9	.625	30	–	22	.577
Washington ‍‍‍	14	–	10	.583	30	–	19	.612
Gonzaga ‍‍‍	13	–	11	.542	37	–	21	.638
Portland ‍‍‍	10	–	14	.417	26	–	25	.510
Portland State ‍‍‍	9	–	15	.375	30	–	24	.556
Eastern Washington ‍‍‍	4	–	20	.167	14	–	36	.280
Southern
No. 3 Stanford ^{x}‍‍‍^{y}	24	–	6	.800	59	–	12	.831
No. 9 Arizona State ‍‍‍^{y}	21	–	9	.700	60	–	13	.822
No. 11 Southern California ‍‍‍^{y}	18	–	12	.600	40	–	22	.645
No. 19 UCLA ‍‍‍^{y}	14	–	16	.467	41	–	26	.612
Arizona ‍‍‍	11	–	19	.367	26	–	34	.433
California ‍‍‍	3	–	27	.100	18	–	43	.295
x – Division champion y – Invited to the NCAA tournament As of June 30, 1990; Rankings from Collegiate Baseball

The 1990 Arizona Wildcats baseball team represented the University of Arizona during the 1990 NCAA Division I baseball season. The Wildcats played their home games at Frank Sancet Stadium. The team was coached by Jerry Kindall in his 18th season at Arizona. The Wildcats finished 26-34 overall and placed 5th in the Pacific-10's Southern Division with an 11–19 record.

== Previous season ==
The Wildcats finished the 1989 season with a record of 45-18-1 and 23–7 in conference play, finishing 1st in the "Six-Pac" (Pac-10 Southern) for the 1st time since 1980. Arizona was selected to the postseason and awarded the West I Regional, which was hosted at Sancet Stadium. This was also the first time since 1980 that the Wildcats had hosted postseason play. The team won their 1st 2 games against Eastern Kentucky and Hawaii before losing to Long Beach State. The Wildcats rallied back to beat Loyola Marymount in their next game before being eliminated with a 2nd loss to Long Beach State.

== Personnel ==
=== Roster ===
1990 Arizona Wildcats baseball roster
• Jacques Bolton • Troy Bradford • Lance Dickson • Todd Edwards • Brian Eldridge	• Barry Johnson • Jack Johnson • Damon Mashore • Robert Moen • J.J. Northam • Jason Hisey	• Robert Moen • J.J. Northam • Billy Owens • Donald Pruitt • John Tejcek

=== Coaches ===
1990 Arizona Wildcats baseball coaching staff
- Jerry Kindall - Head coach
- Jerry Stitt - Assistant coach
- Jim Wing - Assistant coach

== 1990 Schedule and results ==
1990 Arizona Wildcats baseball game log
Regular season
Date	Opponent	Site/Stadium	Score	Overall Record	Pac-10 Record
Jan 27	Minnesota	Sancet Stadium • Tucson, AZ	L 8-11	0-1	
Jan 28	Minnesota	Sancet Stadium • Tucson, AZ	L 4-10	0-2	
Jan 29	Minnesota	Sancet Stadium • Tucson, AZ	W 10-7	1-2	
Feb 1	Loyola Marymount	Sancet Stadium • Tucson, AZ	W 2-1	2-2	
Feb 2	Loyola Marymount	Sancet Stadium • Tucson, AZ	L 0-5	2-3	
Feb 3	Loyola Marymount	Sancet Stadium • Tucson, AZ	W 11-6	3-3	
Feb 5	Cal State Dominguez Hills	Sancet Stadium • Tucson, AZ	L 4-5	3-4	
Feb 6	Cal State Dominguez Hills	Sancet Stadium • Tucson, AZ	W 11-4	4-4	
Feb 8	Cal State Fullerton	Sancet Stadium • Tucson, AZ	L 3-10	4-5	
Feb 9	Cal State Fullerton	Sancet Stadium • Tucson, AZ	L 1-6	4-6	
Feb 10	Cal State Fullerton	Sancet Stadium • Tucson, AZ	W 9-8	5-6	
Feb 17	at Florida State	Dick Howser Stadium • Tallahassee, FL	L 1-7	5-7	
Feb 17	at Florida State	Dick Howser Stadium • Tallahassee, FL	L 8-16	5-8	
Feb 18	at Florida State	Dick Howser Stadium • Tallahassee, FL	L 5-10	5-9	
Feb 20	Westmont	Sancet Stadium • Tucson, AZ	W 14-3	6-9	
Feb 21	Westmont	Sancet Stadium • Tucson, AZ	W 7-5	7-9	
Feb 23	at California	Evans Diamond • Berkeley, CA	W 14-5	8-9	1-0
Feb 24	at California	Evans Diamond • Berkeley, CA	L 5-16	8-10	1-1
Feb 25	at California	Evans Diamond • Berkeley, CA	W 2-0	9-10	2-1
Feb 27	New Mexico State	Sancet Stadium • Tucson, AZ	W 13-9	10-10	
Feb 28	New Mexico State	Sancet Stadium • Tucson, AZ	L 13-14	10-11	
Mar 2	USC	Sancet Stadium • Tucson, AZ	W 5-4	11-11	3-1
Mar 3	USC	Sancet Stadium • Tucson, AZ	W 6-5	12-11	4-1
Mar 4	USC	Sancet Stadium • Tucson, AZ	W 13-5	13-11	5-1
Mar 5	Cal State Los Angeles	Sancet Stadium • Tucson, AZ	L 3-20	13-12	
Mar 6	Cal State Los Angeles	Sancet Stadium • Tucson, AZ	W 9-2	14-12	
Mar 9	at Stanford	Sunken Diamond • Palo Alto, CA	L 2-8	14-13	5-2
Mar 10	at Stanford	Sunken Diamond • Palo Alto, CA	L 4-7	14-14	5-3
Mar 11	at Stanford	Sunken Diamond • Palo Alto, CA	L 2-8	14-15	5-4
Mar 16	at Arizona State	Packard Stadium • Tempe, AZ	L 0-3	14-16	5-5
Mar 17	at Arizona State	Packard Stadium • Tempe, AZ	L 1-3	14-17	5-6
Mar 18	at Arizona State	Packard Stadium • Tempe, AZ	L 2-9	14-18	5-7
Mar 20	Wright State	Sancet Stadium • Tucson, AZ	L 7-10	14-19	
Mar 21	Wright State	Sancet Stadium • Tucson, AZ	W 6-4	15-19	
Mar 24	UCLA	Sancet Stadium • Tucson, AZ	L 3-4	15-20	5-8
Mar 25	UCLA	Sancet Stadium • Tucson, AZ	L 6-8	15-21	5-9
Mar 26	UCLA	Sancet Stadium • Tucson, AZ	L 8-10	15-22	5-10
Mar 30	at USC	Dedeaux Field • Los Angeles, CA	L 1-9	15-23	5-11
Mar 31	at USC	Dedeaux Field • Los Angeles, CA	L 3-16	15-24	5-12
Apr 1	at USC	Dedeaux Field • Los Angeles, CA	L 4-9	15-25	5-13
Apr 5	Liberty	Sancet Stadium • Tucson, AZ	W 5-3	16-25	
Apr 6	Liberty	Sancet Stadium • Tucson, AZ	W 11-4	17-25	
Apr 7	Liberty	Sancet Stadium • Tucson, AZ	L 6-8	17-26	
Apr 12	at UCLA	Jackie Robinson Stadium • Los Angeles, CA	W 4-3	18-26	6-13
Apr 13	at UCLA	Jackie Robinson Stadium • Los Angeles, CA	W 9-7	19-26	7-13
Apr 14	at UCLA	Jackie Robinson Stadium • Los Angeles, CA	L 4-14	19-27	7-14
Apr 17	at Grand Canyon	Brazell Stadium • Phoenix, AZ	L 1-8	19-28	
Apr 20	Stanford	Sancet Stadium • Tucson, AZ	L 3-5	19-29	7-15
Apr 21	Stanford	Sancet Stadium • Tucson, AZ	L 3-9	19-30	7-16
Apr 22	Stanford	Sancet Stadium • Tucson, AZ	L 5-13	19-31	7-17
Apr 27	California	Sancet Stadium • Tucson, AZ	W 12-8	20-31	8-18
Apr 28	California	Sancet Stadium • Tucson, AZ	W 11-2	21-31	9-17
Apr 29	California	Sancet Stadium • Tucson, AZ	W 17-10	22-31	10-17
May 5	Grand Canyon	Sancet Stadium • Tucson, AZ	W 22-4	23-31	
May 11	Arizona State	Sancet Stadium • Tucson, AZ	W 2-1	24-31	11-17
May 12	Arizona State	Sancet Stadium • Tucson, AZ	L 4-6	24-32	11-18
May 13	Arizona State	Sancet Stadium • Tucson, AZ	L 4-5	24-33	11-19
May 18	vs NC State	Boshamer Stadium • Chapel Hill, NC	W 7-4	25-33	
May 19	at North Carolina	Boshamer Stadium • Chapel Hill, NC	W 3-2	26-33	
May 20	vs Clemson	Boshamer Stadium • Chapel Hill, NC	L 1-9	26-34	

== 1990 MLB draft ==
Player	Position	Round	Overall	MLB team
Lance Dickson	LHP	1	23	Chicago Cubs
Troy Bradford	RHP	2s	72	Chicago Cubs
Steve Gil	OF	13	363	San Diego Padres
Don Pruitt	RHP	23	624	Milwaukee Brewers
Todd Edwards	OF	29	780	Milwaukee Brewers
Jason Hisey	RHP	33	874	Chicago White Sox
