= Dwight Taylor =

Dwight Taylor may refer to:

- Dwight Taylor (baseball) (born 1960), former Major League Baseball outfielder for the Kansas City Royals
- Dwight Taylor (writer) (1903–1986), film and television writer
- Dwight Willard Taylor (1932–2006), malacologist
