= 2008 Arizona Wildcats baseball team =

American college baseball season

2008 Arizona Wildcats baseball

Ann Arbor Regional Champions

Coral Gables Super Regional
- Conference: Pacific-10 Conference

Ranking
- Coaches: No. 14
- CB: No. 13
- Record: 42-19 (12-12 Pac-10)
- Head coach: Andy Lopez (7th season)
- Assistant coaches: Mark Wasikowski (7th season); Jeff Casper (7th season); Keith Francis (2nd season)
- Home stadium: Sancet Stadium

2008 Pacific-10 Conference baseball standings
	Conf.						Overall
Team	W		L		T	PCT	W		L		T	PCT
No. 9 Arizona State ‍†‍‍^{y}	16	–	8	–	0	.667	49	–	13	–	0	.790
No. 4 Stanford ‍‍‍	14	–	10	–	0	.583	41	–	24	–	2	.627
UCLA ‍‍‍^{y}	13	–	11	–	0	.542	33	–	27	–	0	.550
No. 13 Arizona ‍‍‍^{y}	12	–	12	–	0	.500	42	–	19	–	0	.689
California ‍‍‍	12	–	12	–	0	.500	33	–	21	–	2	.607
Washington ‍‍‍	11	–	13	–	0	.458	33	–	22	–	0	.600
Oregon State ‍‍‍^{y}	11	–	13	–	0	.458	28	–	24	–	0	.538
Southern California ‍‍‍	11	–	13	–	0	.458	28	–	28	–	0	.500
Washington State ‍‍‍	8	–	16	–	0	.333	30	–	26	–	0	.536
† – Conference champion y – Invited to the NCAA tournament As of June 30, 2007; Rankings from Collegiate Baseball

The 2008 Arizona Wildcats baseball team represented the University of Arizona in the 2008 NCAA Division I baseball season. The Wildcats played their home games at Jerry Kindall Field at Frank Sancet Stadium. The team was coached by Andy Lopez in his 7th season at Arizona.

== Personnel ==
=== Roster ===
2008 Arizona Wildcats roster
Pitchers • 11 - Preston Guilmet - Junior • 21 - Tyler Stotts - Junior • 17 - Ryan Doyle - Freshman • 18 - Eric Berger - RS Junior • 19 - David Coulon - Senior • 23 - Rick Patton - Freshman • 25 - Daniel Schlereth - RS Junior • 26 - Jason Stoffel - Sophomore • 27 - Shea Ross - Sophomore • 34 - Cory Burns - Junior • 43 - Richie Sandoval - Freshman • 45 - Ryan Perry - Junior • 46 - Matt Chaffee - Freshman • 47 - Aaron Rhodes - Freshman • 49 - Joe Allison - RS Freshman • 50 - Grayson Adams - Junior	Catchers • 5 - Dwight Childs - Sophomore • 12 - Daniel Butler - RS Sophomore • 13 - Ryan Lush - Sophomore • 30 - Jake Meskin - RS Freshman Infielders • 1 - Travis Peep - Junior • 2 - Colt Sedbrook - Senior • 3 - Kevin Luyben - Freshman • 14 - Robert Abel - Sophomore • 21 - Rafael Valenzuela - Sophomore • 24 - CJ Ziegler - Senior • 28 - Mike Weldon - Sophomore • 36 - Matt Koerner - Sophomore • 38 - Bryce Ortega - Freshman • 39 - Dillon Baird - Sophomore • 42 - Andrew Allen - Freshman	Outfielders • 4 - Jon Gaston - Junior • 10 - Bobby Coyle - Freshman • 15 - Chad Standrowicz - Freshman • 20 - Brad Glenn - Junior • 29 - Oliver Padre - Sophomore • 33 - Matt Presley - Freshman • 35 - Hunter Pace - Junior • 40 - Diallo Fon - RS Sophomore • 48 - TJ Steele - Junior

=== Coaches ===
2008 Arizona Wildcats baseball coaching staff
- Andy Lopez - Head coach
- Mark Wasikowski - Assistant coach
- Jeff Casper - Assistant coach
- Keith Francis - Volunteer assistant coach

=== Opening day ===
Opening Day Starters
Name	Position
Hunter Pace	Left fielder
Jon Gaston	Right fielder
T.J. Steele	Right fielder
C.J. Ziegler	First baseman
Dillon Baird	Third baseman
Brad Glenn	Designated hitter
Colt Sedbrook	Second baseman
Robert Abel	Shortstop
Dwight Childs	Catcher
Tyler Stotts	Starting pitcher

== Schedule and results ==
2008 Arizona Wildcats baseball game log
Regular season
Date	Opponent	Rank	Site/stadium	Score	Win	Loss	Overall Record	Pac-10 Record
Feb 22	at Georgia	#2	Foley Field • Athens, GA	L 7-9	Holder (1-0)	Guilmet (0-1)	0-1	
Feb 23	at Georgia	#2	Foley Field • Athens, GA	W 7-1	Coulon (1-0)	Dodson (0-1)	1-1	
Feb 24	at Georgia	#2	Foley Field • Athens, GA	W 9-8	Colla (1-0)	Ochs (0-1)	2-1	
Feb 29	vs Sacramento State	#1	Sancet Stadium • Tucson, AZ	W 9-3	Guilmet (1-1)	Buchta (0-1)	3-1	
Mar 1	vs Sacramento State	#1	Sancet Stadium • Tucson, AZ	W 15-7	Coulon (2-0)	Ramirez (0-1)	4-1	
Mar 2	vs Sacramento State	#1	Sancet Stadium • Tucson, AZ	W 10-9	Schlereth (1-0)	Baek (0-1)	5-1	
Mar 4	vs UNLV	#1	Sancet Stadium • Tucson, AZ	W 6-5	Burns (1-0)	Goodman (0-1)	6-1	
Mar 5	vs UNLV	#1	Sancet Stadium • Tucson, AZ	W 16-6	Berger (1-0)	Baca (0-1)	7-1	
Mar 7	at South Alabama	#1	Whataburger Field • Corpus Christi, TX	W 18-0	Guilmet (2-1)	Nabors (2-1)	8-1	
Mar 8	at Texas A&M-Corpus Christi	#1	Whataburger Field • Corpus Christi, TX	W 3-0	Coulon (3-0)	Gutierrez (-)	9-1	
Mar 9	at Notre Dame	#1	Whataburger Field • Corpus Christi, TX	W 16-0	Perry (1-0)	Dupra (1-2)	10-1	
Mar 14	vs #20 Cal State Fullerton	#1	Sancet Stadium • Tucson, AZ	W 8-3	Stoffel (1-0)	Dovel (1-1)	11-1	
Mar 15	vs #20 Cal State Fullerton	#1	Sancet Stadium • Tucson, AZ	W 6-2	Coulon (4-0)	Renken (3-1)	12-1	
Mar 16	vs #20 Cal State Fullerton	#1	Sancet Stadium • Tucson, AZ	L 7-10	Arbiso (2-2)	Perry (1-1)	12-2	
Mar 18	at #1 Arizona State	#2	Packard Stadium • Tempe, AZ	L 5-6	Sauer (3-0)	Colla (1-1)	12-3	
Mar 20	at Southern California	#2	Dedeaux Field • Los Angeles, CA	L 0-5	Milone (3-1)	Coulon (4-1)	12-4	1-0
Mar 21	at Southern California	#2	Dedeaux Field • Los Angeles, CA	W 10-2	Guilmet (3-1)	Couture (1-1)	13-4	1-1
Mar 22	at Southern California	#2	Dedeaux Field • Los Angeles, CA	L 0-5	Cook (3-1)	Berger (1-1)	13-5	1-2
Mar 25	at Oklahoma State	#6	Reynolds Stadium • Stillwater, OK	L 2-10	Gardner (3-1)	Colla (1-2)	13-6	
Mar 26	at Oklahoma State	#6	Reynolds Stadium • Stillwater, OK	L 2-3	Neal (2-0)	Perry (1-2)	13-7	
Mar 28	vs #23 UCLA	#6	Sancet Stadium • Tucson, AZ	L 3-4	Drummond (1-2)	Stoffel (1-1)	13-8	1-3
Mar 29	vs #23 UCLA	#6	Sancet Stadium • Tucson, AZ	L 8-20	Brewer (3-2)	Coulon (4-2)	13-9	1-4
Mar 30	vs #23 UCLA	#6	Sancet Stadium • Tucson, AZ	W 8-4	Berger (2-1)	Brooks (1-2)	14-9	2-4
Apr 4	at Washington	#18	Husky Ballpark • Seattle, WA	L 0-1	Haughian (3-2)	Guilmet (3-2)	14-10	2-5
Apr 5	at Washington	#18	Husky Ballpark • Seattle, WA	W 5-0	Coulon (5-2)	Nobles (2-1)	15-10	3-5
Apr 6	at Washington	#18	Husky Ballpark • Seattle, WA	L 1-5	Merry (4-0)	Berger (2-2)	15-11	3-6
Apr 8	at San Diego State		Tony Gwynn Stadium • San Diego, CA	W 11-6	Colla (2-2)	Berger (2-5)	16-11	
Apr 9	at San Diego State		Tony Gwynn Stadium • San Diego, CA	W 5-2	Berger (3-2)	Solow (1-5)	17-11	
Apr 11	vs Indiana State		Sancet Stadium • Tucson, AZ	W 10-2	Guilmet (4-2)	Manus (1-5)	18-11	
Apr 12	vs Indiana State		Sancet Stadium • Tucson, AZ	W 5-0	Coulon (6-2)	Shelton (3-2)	19-11	
Apr 13	vs Indiana State		Sancet Stadium • Tucson, AZ	W 7-6	Perry (2-2)	Inman (2-2)	20-11	
Apr 15	at New Mexico		Isotopes Park • Albuquerque, NM	W 10-6	Colla (3-2)	Hesketh (2-3)	21-11	
Apr 16	at New Mexico		Isotopes Park • Albuquerque, NM	W 4-2	Perry (3-2)	Kerr (2-2)	22-11	
Apr 18	vs Washington State		Sancet Stadium • Tucson, AZ	W 7-6	Stoffel (2-1)	Way (1-3)	23-11	4-6
Apr 19	vs Washington State		Sancet Stadium • Tucson, AZ	W 6-5	Perry (4-2)	Harvey (0-1)	24-11	5-6
Apr 20	vs Washington State		Sancet Stadium • Tucson, AZ	W 4-2	Berger (4-2)	Wise (0-2)	25-11	6-6
Apr 22	vs New Mexico	#23	Sancet Stadium • Tucson, AZ	W 4-1	Colla (4-2)	Hesketh (2-4)	26-11	
Apr 23	vs New Mexico	#23	Sancet Stadium • Tucson, AZ	W 10-4	Burns (2-0)	Kerr (2-3)	27-11	
Apr 25	at Oregon State	#23	Goss Stadium • Corvallis, OR	W 7-0	Guilmet (5-2)	Stutes (2-5)	28-11	7-6
Apr 26	at Oregon State	#23	Goss Stadium • Corvallis, OR	L 3-4	Robles (3-0)	Coulon (6-3)	28-12	7-7
Apr 27	at Oregon State	#23	Goss Stadium • Corvallis, OR	L 2-3	Reyes (3-2)	Berger (4-3)	28-13	7-8
Apr 29	vs San Diego State		Sancet Stadium • Tucson, AZ	W 3-2	Burns (3-0)	Solow (3-6)	29-13	
Apr 30	vs San Diego State		Sancet Stadium • Tucson, AZ	W 13-4	Chaffee (1-0)	Kaufman (1-3)	30-13	
May 2	at #16 California		Evans Diamond • Berkeley, CA	L 5-11	Ross (7-2)	Guilmet (5-3)	30-14	7-9
May 3	at #16 California		Evans Diamond • Berkeley, CA	L 5-6	Gorgen (1-2)	Perry (4-3)	30-15	7-10
May 4	at #16 California		Evans Diamond • Berkeley, CA	W 16-5	Berger (5-3)	Rollin (4-2)	31-15	8-10
May 9	vs Utah Valley State		Sancet Stadium • Tucson, AZ	W 10-4	Guilmet (6-3)	Christensen (1-7)	32-15	
May 10	vs Utah Valley State		Sancet Stadium • Tucson, AZ	W 7-0	Coulon (7-3)	Brady (2-7)	33-15	
May 11	vs Utah Valley State		Sancet Stadium • Tucson, AZ	W 11-4	Berger (6-3)	Smith (2-5)	34-15	
May 17	vs #16 Stanford		Sancet Stadium • Tucson, AZ	W 9-6	Perry (5-3)	Yount (3-3)	35-15	9-10
May 18	vs #16 Stanford		Sancet Stadium • Tucson, AZ	L 5-8	Storen (2-3)	Stoffel (2-2)	35-16	9-11
May 19	vs #16 Stanford		Sancet Stadium • Tucson, AZ	W 15-11	Schlereth (2-0)	Hancock (1-2)	36-16	10-11
May 22	vs #2 Arizona State		Sancet Stadium • Tucson, AZ	L 6-13	Satow (8-3)	Guilmet (6-4)	36-17	10-12
May 23	vs #2 Arizona State		Sancet Stadium • Tucson, AZ	W 4-3	Stoffel (3-2)	Leake (9-2)	37-17	11-12
May 24	vs #2 Arizona State		Sancet Stadium • Tucson, AZ	W 7-4	Berger (7-3)	Blair (4-2)	38-17	12-12
NCAA Ann Arbor Regional
May 30	vs (4) Eastern Michigan	(1) #23	Ray Fisher Stadium • Ann Arbor, MI	W 13-7	Perry (6-3)	Hoffman (5-3)	39-17	
May 31	vs (2) #16 Michigan	(1) #23	Ray Fisher Stadium • Ann Arbor, MI	W 4-3	Coulon (8-3)	Fetter (10-2)	40-17	
Jun 1	vs (3) #24 Kentucky	(1) #23	Ray Fisher Stadium • Ann Arbor, MI	W 5-3	Berger (8-3)	Baber (1-3)	41-17	
NCAA Coral Gables Super Regional
Jun 6	at #1 Miami	#14	Mark Light Stadium • Coral Gables, FL	W 6-3	Stoffel (4-2)	Gutierrez (5-3)	42-17	
Jun 7	at #1 Miami	#14	Mark Light Stadium • Coral Gables, FL	L 10-14	Gutierrez (5-0)	Coulon (8-4)	42-18	
Jun 8	at #1 Miami	#14	Mark Light Stadium • Coral Gables, FL	L 2-4	Garcia (7-2)	Berger (8-4)	42-19	

=== Ann Arbor Regional ===
Ann Arbor Regional Regional Teams
(1) Arizona Wildcats	(4) Eastern Michigan Eagles	(2) Michigan Wolverines	(3) Kentucky Wildcats

=== Coral Gables Super Regional ===
Coral Gables Super Regional Teams
(1) Miami Hurricanes	vs.	(16) Arizona Wildcats

== 2008 MLB draft ==
Player	Position	Round	Overall	MLB team
Ryan Perry	RHP	1	21	Detroit Tigers
Daniel Schlereth	LHP	1	26	Arizona Diamondbacks
T.J. Steele	OF	4	122	Houston Astros
Jon Gaston	OF	7	212	Houston Astros
Eric Berger	LHP	8	261	Cleveland Indians
Mike Colla	RHP	14	414	Pittsburgh Pirates
David Coulon	LHP	15	456	Minnesota Twins
C.J. Ziegler	1B	16	477	San Francisco Giants
Brad Glenn	3B	17	514	Oakland Athletics
Preston Guilmet	RHP	22	664	Oakland Athletics
Colt Sedbrook	SS	22	665	St. Louis Cardinals
