= Andy Lopez =

American college baseball coach (born 1953)

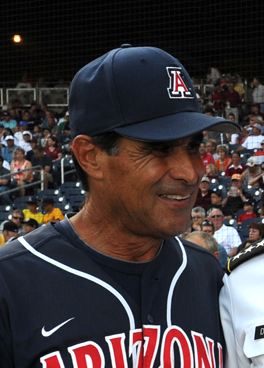
- Lopez in 2012

Biographical details
- Born: November 30, 1953 (age 72); Los Angeles, California, U.S.
- Education: UCLA

Playing career
- Position: SS

Coaching career (HC unless noted)
- 1983–1988: Cal State Dominguez Hills
- 1989–1994: Pepperdine
- 1995–2001: Florida
- 2002–2015: Arizona

Head coaching record
- Overall: 1,177–742–7 (.613)

Accomplishments and honors

Championships
- 2× NCAA (1992, 2012); 4× WCC (1989, 1991−1993); 2× SEC (1996, 1998); Pac-12 (2012)

Awards
- 3× National Coach of the Year (1992, 1996, 2012); 3× CCAA Coach of the Year (1985–1987); 4× WCC Coach of the Year (1989, 1991–1993); SEC Coach of the Year (1996); Pac-12 Coach of the Year (2012)
- College Baseball Hall of Fame; Inducted in 2022

Andrew Lopez (born November 30, 1953) is an American former college baseball coach. He was most recently the head baseball coach at the University of Arizona, and has served as the head baseball coach at Cal State Dominguez Hills, Pepperdine, and Florida. Lopez compiled an overall win–loss record of 1,177–742–7 (.613) in thirty-three seasons as a head coach.

He is one of only three coaches to lead three different programs to the College World Series and one of only two coaches, along with Augie Garrido, to win the College World Series with two different programs. His Division I teams (Pepperdine, Florida, and Arizona) have appeared in the postseason seventeen out of twenty-six seasons. He has earned National Coach of the Year honors two times, and Conference Coach of the Year honors eight times.

Lopez began his head coaching career at Cal State Dominguez Hills, a Division II school, in 1983 and built the program into a national championship contender. The Toros won back-to-back California Collegiate Athletic Association (CCAA) Championships in 1986 and 1987. He was also named CCAA Coach of the Year in three consecutive seasons from 1985 to 1987. In six seasons as the head coach at Cal State Dominguez Hills, he compiled a 168–152–2 (.525) record.

In 1989, he was hired as the head coach of the Pepperdine Waves baseball team at Pepperdine University. In six seasons, he compiled a 241–107–3 (.692) record. In just his first season, he went 41–19–1, and ultimately won four consecutive post-season tournaments. In 1992, his team won the only National Championship in school history. The 3–2 victory over Cal-State Fullerton earned him consensus National Coach of the Year honors.

During his seven seasons coaching the Florida Gators baseball team at the University of Florida, he compiled a 278–159–1 (.636) record. He won two Southeastern Conference (SEC) championships and appeared in five NCAA tournaments and two College World Series. While at UF, he coached future major leaguers David Eckstein, Mark Ellis, Brad Wilkerson, David Ross, Ryan Shealy, and Josh Fogg. He also averaged 39 wins per season, including a school record 50 games and a College World Series appearance in 1996. Lopez, however, was controversial with some Gators faithful for not recruiting local players and for not extending scholarships to players that he did not recruit to the program. His tenure crested with a second College World Series appearance in 1998. Following a 35–27 season in 2001, Florida fired him.

After being dismissed by the University of Florida, Lopez was hired as head coach of the Arizona Wildcats baseball team at the University of Arizona. In his fourteen seasons as head coach, U of A qualified for the NCAA tournament eight times, including two College World Series appearances and one national championship. His 2012 national championship team went undefeated in post-season play winning 10 games, three at the Tucson Regional, two at the Super Regional against St. John's at Hi Corbett Field in Tucson, and five at the College World Series in Omaha. Lopez is only the second coach in NCAA history to win the CWS with two different teams. As the Wildcats' head coach, Lopez had an overall record of 490–324–1 (.601), and a conference record of 186–183 (.504).

Lopez announced his retirement on May 25, 2015, in a press conference alongside Athletic Director Greg Byrne.

On July 18, 2017, the American Baseball Coaches Association announced that they would induct Andy Lopez into their 2018 Hall of Fame Class.

In 2022, Lopez was inducted into the College Baseball Hall of Fame.

== Head coaching record ==
Record table
Season	Team	Overall	Conference	Standing	Postseason
Cal State Dominguez Hills (California Collegiate Athletic Association) (1983–1988)
1983	Cal State Dominguez Hills	15–27	8–19		
1984	Cal State Dominguez Hills	25–35–1	11–19		
1985	Cal State Dominguez Hills	34–23	20–10		
1986	Cal State Dominguez Hills	32–22–1	19–11	1st	NCAA Regional
1987	Cal State Dominguez Hills	43–15	23–7	1st	College World Series
1988	Cal State Dominguez Hills	19–30	10–20		
Cal State Dominguez Hills:		168–152–2	91–86		
Pepperdine Waves (West Coast Conference) (1989–1994)
1989	Pepperdine	41–19–1	20–4	1st	NCAA Regional
1990	Pepperdine	37–23	24–12	2nd	
1991	Pepperdine	41–17–1	25–10	1st	NCAA Regional
1992	Pepperdine	48–11–1	23–4	1st	College World Series champions
1993	Pepperdine	41–17	24–6	1st	NCAA Regional
1994	Pepperdine	33–20	20–10	2nd	
Pepperdine:		241–107–3	136–46		
Florida Gators (Southeastern Conference) (1995–2001)
1995	Florida	32–24	12–14	T–2nd (East)	
1996	Florida	50–18	20–10	1st (East)	College World Series
1997	Florida	40–24	17–13	T–1st (East)	NCAA Regional
1998	Florida	46–18	21–8	1st (East)	College World Series
1999	Florida	31–25	13–17	T–2nd (East)	
2000	Florida	44–23–1	18–11–1	2nd (East)	NCAA Regional
2001	Florida	35–27	16–14	4th (East)	NCAA Regional
Florida:		278–159–1	117–87–1		
Arizona Wildcats (Pac–12 Conference) (2002–present)
2002	Arizona	31–24	9–15	T–7th	
2003	Arizona	35–23	13–11	4th	NCAA Regional
2004	Arizona	36–27–1	12–12	5th	College World Series
2005	Arizona	39–21	17–7	2nd	NCAA Regional
2006	Arizona	27–28	12–12	4th	
2007	Arizona	42–17	15–9	2nd	NCAA Regional
2008	Arizona	42–19	12–12	T–4th	NCAA Super Regional
2009	Arizona	30–25	13–14	T–5th	
2010	Arizona	34–24	12–15	T–7th	NCAA Regional
2011	Arizona	39–21	15–12	4th	NCAA Regional
2012	Arizona	48–17	20–10	T–1st	College World Series champions
2013	Arizona	34–21	15–15	t–6th	
2014	Arizona	22–33	9–21	10th	
2015	Arizona	31–24	12–18	8th	
Arizona:		490–324–1	186–183		
Total:		1,177–742–7			
National champion Postseason invitational champion Conference regular season champion Conference regular season and conference tournament champion Division regular season champion Division regular season and conference tournament champion Conference tournament champion

== See also ==
- List of college baseball career coaching wins leaders
