= 1999 Arizona Wildcats baseball team =

American college baseball season

1999 Arizona Wildcats baseball

Waco Regional
- Conference: Pacific-10 Conference
- Record: 33–23 (13–11 Pac-10)
- Head coach: Jerry Stitt (3rd season)
- Assistant coaches: Bill Kinneberg (3rd season); Victor Solis (3rd season)
- Home stadium: Sancet Stadium

1999 Pacific-10 Conference baseball standings
	Conf.				Overall
Team	W		L	PCT	W		L	PCT
No. 3 Stanford ‍†‍‍^{y}	19	–	5	.792	50	–	15	.769
No. 12 Southern California ‍‍‍^{y}	17	–	7	.708	36	–	26	.581
Arizona ‍‍‍^{y}	13	–	11	.542	33	–	23	.589
UCLA ‍‍‍^{y}	13	–	11	.542	31	–	33	.484
Arizona State ‍‍‍	12	–	12	.500	39	–	21	.650
Washington ‍‍‍	12	–	12	.500	33	–	23	.589
California ‍‍‍	11	–	13	.458	27	–	31	.466
Oregon State ‍‍‍	7	–	17	.292	19	–	35	.352
Washington State ‍‍‍	4	–	20	.167	24	–	31	.436
† – Conference champion y – Invited to the NCAA tournament As of June 30, 1999; Rankings from Collegiate Baseball

The 1999 Arizona Wildcats baseball team represented the University of Arizona during the 1999 NCAA Division I baseball season. The Wildcats played their home games at Frank Sancet Stadium. The team was coached by Jerry Stitt in his third season at Arizona. The Wildcats finished 33-23 overall and placed 3rd in the Pacific-10 with a 13-11 record - the only time during Coach Stitt's tenure that they would finish above .500 in conference play. The 1999 season marked the first time that the Pac-10 did not play in divisions, as Portland State's discontinuation of baseball following the 1998 season caused the Northern Division to shrink to only three members (compared to the Southern Division's six).

Arizona was selected into the postseason for the first time since 1993 as the 3-seed in the Waco Regional. They subsequently lost their first two games to 2-seed Minnesota and 4-seed Eastern Illinois to be eliminated from the tournament. This would be the only tournament appearance of Stitt's head coaching career, and would be the last for the Wildcats until 2003.

== Previous season ==
The Wildcats finished the 1998 season with a record of 30-25 and 13-14 in conference play, finishing 4th in the "Six-Pac" (Pac-10 Southern). Arizona missed the postseason for the fifth straight season and second time in Jerry Stitt's tenure.

== Personnel ==
=== Roster ===
1999 Arizona Wildcats baseball roster
Pitchers • 4 - Mike Meyer - Junior • 14 - Dave Abbott - Junior • 15 - Brian Pemble - Freshman • 19 - Rob Shabansky - Junior • 23 - Tony Milo - Junior • 27 - David Capek - Junior • 30 - Robert Schulz - Junior • 31 - Michael Crawford - Junior • 33 - Ben Diggins - Sophomore • 36 - Scott Wood - Senior • 37 - Josh Pearce - Junior • 45 - Wesley Zlotoff - Sophomore	Catchers • 5 - Jeff Casper - Sophomore • 26 - Dennis Anderson - Junior • 29 - Josh France - Sophomore • 40 - Chris Cunningham - Freshman Infielders • 10 - Brad Hassey - Freshman • 11 - Keoni DeRenne - Sophomore • 12 - Ben Winslow - Freshman • 16 - Andy Juday - Senior • 17 - Erik Torres - Sophomore • 18 - Shelley Duncan - Freshman • 25 - Brad Fendley - Sophomore • 41 - Kelsey Osburn - Freshman • 44 - Ernie Durazo - Freshman	Outfielders • 1 - Rafell Jones - Junior • 2 - Troy Gingrich - Junior • 24 - Kenny Huff - Freshman • 34 - Jason Shroyer - Sophomore • 43 - Devin Welch - Senior

=== Coaches ===
1999 Arizona Wildcats baseball coaching staff
- Jerry Stitt - Head coach
- Bill Kinneberg - Assistant coach
- Victor Solis - Assistant coach

=== Opening day ===
Opening Day starters
Name	Position
Troy Gingrich	Center fielder
Keoni DeRenne	Shortstop
Erik Torres	Third baseman
Ernie Durazo	First baseman
Shelley Duncan	Right fielder
Kenny Huff	Left fielder
Ben Diggins	Designated hitter
Dennis Anderson	Catcher
Andy Juday	Second baseman
Michael Crawford	Starting pitcher

== Schedule and results ==
1999 Arizona Wildcats baseball game log
Regular season
Date	Opponent	Rank	Site/stadium	Score	Win/Loss	Overall Record	Pac-10 Record
Jan 22	Saint Mary's		Sancet Stadium • Tucson, AZ	W 19-6	Abbott (1-0)	1-0	
Jan 23	Saint Mary's		Sancet Stadium • Tucson, AZ	W 7-2	Pearce (1-0)	2-0	
Jan 24	Saint Mary's		Sancet Stadium • Tucson, AZ	W 9-0	Diggins (1-0)	3-0	
Jan 28	at Hawaii-Hilo		Wong Stadium • Hilo, HI	W 6-0	Crawford (1-0)	4-0	
Jan 29	at Hawaii-Hilo		Wong Stadium • Hilo, HI	W 17-3	Pearce (2-0)	5-0	
Jan 31	at Hawaii-Hilo		Wong Stadium • Hilo, HI	W 6-4	Abbott (2-0)	6-0	
Feb 4	New Mexico		Sancet Stadium • Tucson, AZ	W 15-5	Crawford (2-0)	7-0	
Feb 5	New Mexico		Sancet Stadium • Tucson, AZ	W 5-4	Milo (1-0)	8-0	
Feb 6	New Mexico		Sancet Stadium • Tucson, AZ	W 9-3	Abbott (3-0)	9-0	
Feb 9	UNLV	#21	Sancet Stadium • Tucson, AZ	W 6-5	Zlotoff (1-0)	10-0	
Feb 10	UNLV	#21	Sancet Stadium • Tucson, AZ	W 12-11	Meyer (1-0)	11-0	
Feb 12	#15 Texas A&M	#21	Sancet Stadium • Tucson, AZ	W 11-5	Milo (2-0)	12-0	
Feb 13	#15 Texas A&M	#21	Sancet Stadium • Tucson, AZ	W 5-2	Pearce (3-0)	13-0	
Feb 14	#15 Texas A&M	#21	Sancet Stadium • Tucson, AZ	L 9-18	Diggins (1-1)	13-1	
Feb 18	vs Loyola Marymount	#15	Tony Gwynn Stadium • San Diego, CA	L 3-15	Crawford (2-1)	13-2	
Feb 19	at San Diego	#15	John Cunningham Stadium • San Diego, CA	W 10-4	Diggins (2-1)	14-2	
Feb 20	at San Diego State	#15	Tony Gwynn Stadium • San Diego, CA	L 9-12	Duncan (0-1)	14-3	
Feb 21	vs Oklahoma State	#15	Tony Gwynn Stadium • San Diego, CA	L 4-7	Zlotoff (1-1)	14-4	
Feb 26	#15 Arizona State		Sancet Stadium • Tucson, AZ	W 9-8	Meyer (2-0)	15-4	
Feb 27	#15 Arizona State		Sancet Stadium • Tucson, AZ	L 9-11	Crawford (2-2)	15-5	
Feb 28	#15 Arizona State		Sancet Stadium • Tucson, AZ	L 3-18	Milo (2-1)	15-6	
Mar 5	at Tulane		Turchin Stadium • New Orleans, LA	L 5-9	Pearce (3-1)	15-7	
Mar 6	at Tulane		Turchin Stadium • New Orleans, LA	L 4-11	Pemble (0-1)	15-8	
Mar 7	at Tulane		Turchin Stadium • New Orleans, LA	W 9-3	Diggins (3-1)	16-8	
Mar 12	UCLA		Sancet Stadium • Tucson, AZ	W 6-4	Pearce (4-1)	17-8	1-0
Mar 13	UCLA		Sancet Stadium • Tucson, AZ	L 1-6	Crawford (2-3)	17-9	1-1
Mar 14	UCLA		Sancet Stadium • Tucson, AZ	W 8-7	Diggins (4-1)	18-9	2-1
Mar 16	Grand Canyon		Sancet Stadium • Tucson, AZ	W 11-2	Pemble (1-1)	19-9	
Mar 19	at USC		Dedeaux Field • Los Angeles, CA	L 1-17	Pearce (4-2)	19-10	2-2
Mar 20	at USC		Dedeaux Field • Los Angeles, CA	W 9-4	Diggins (5-1)	20-10	3-2
Mar 21	at USC		Dedeaux Field • Los Angeles, CA	L 5-8	Crawford (2-4)	20-11	3-3
Mar 26	#4 Stanford		Sancet Stadium • Tucson, AZ	L 4-8	Pearce (4-3)	20-12	3-4
Mar 27	#4 Stanford		Sancet Stadium • Tucson, AZ	L 4-12	Diggins (5-2)	20-13	3-5
Mar 28	#4 Stanford		Sancet Stadium • Tucson, AZ	L 11-12	Zlotoff (1-2)	20-14	3-6
Apr 2	Washington		Sancet Stadium • Tucson, AZ	L 3-6	Pearce (4-4)	20-15	3-7
Apr 2	Washington		Sancet Stadium • Tucson, AZ	L 1-2	Diggins (5-3)	20-16	3-8
Apr 3	Washington		Sancet Stadium • Tucson, AZ	W 17-4	Crawford (3-4)	21-16	4-8
Apr 6	Grand Canyon		Sancet Stadium • Tucson, AZ	W 13-1	Pemble (2-1)	22-16	
Apr 9	Oregon State		Sancet Stadium • Tucson, AZ	W 11-9	Diggins (6-3)	23-16	5-8
Apr 10	Oregon State		Sancet Stadium • Tucson, AZ	W 10-7	Pearce (5-4)	24-16	6-8
Apr 11	Oregon State		Sancet Stadium • Tucson, AZ	W 10-5	Zlotoff (2-2)	25-16	7-8
Apr 13	at Grand Canyon		Brazell Stadium • Phoenix, AZ	W 10-3	Milo (3-1)	26-16	
Apr 17	at Washington State		Buck Bailey Field • Pullman, WA	W 6-3	Pearce (6-4)	27-16	8-8
Apr 17	at Washington State		Buck Bailey Field • Pullman, WA	W 16-11	Meyer (3-0)	28-16	9-8
Apr 18	at Washington State		Buck Bailey Field • Pullman, WA	W 13-9	Diggins (7-3)	29-16	10-8
Apr 23	Southern Utah		Sancet Stadium • Tucson, AZ	L 3-5	Pearce (6-5)	29-17	
Apr 24	Southern Utah		Sancet Stadium • Tucson, AZ	L 6-10	Diggins (7-4)	29-18	
Apr 25	Southern Utah		Sancet Stadium • Tucson, AZ	W 8-5	Crawford (4-4)	30-18	
Apr 30	at California		Evans Diamond • Berkeley, CA	L 0-4	Pearce (6-6)	30-19	10-9
May 1	at California		Evans Diamond • Berkeley, CA	W 6-5	Diggins (8-4)	31-19	11-9
May 2	at California		Evans Diamond • Berkeley, CA	L 2-8	Crawford (4-5)	31-20	11-10
May 14	at #25 Arizona State		Packard Stadium • Tempe, AZ	W 13-5	Pearce (7-6)	32-20	12-10
May 15	at #25 Arizona State		Packard Stadium • Tempe, AZ	L 9-22	Diggins (8-5)	32-21	12-11
May 16	at #25 Arizona State		Packard Stadium • Tempe, AZ	W 6-2	Crawford (5-5)	33-21	13-11
NCAA Waco Regional
May 28	vs (2) Minnesota	(3) #25	Baylor Ballpark • Waco, TX	L 3-4	Milo (3-2)	33-22	
May 29	vs (4) Eastern Illinois	(3) #25	Baylor Ballpark • Waco, TX	L 4-13	Diggins (8-6)	33-23	

=== Waco Regional ===
Waco Regional teams
(1) Baylor Bears	(4) Eastern Illinois Panthers	(2) Minnesota Golden Gophers	(3) Arizona Wildcats

== 1999 MLB draft ==
Player	Position	Round	Overall	MLB team
Josh Pearce	RHP	2S	82	St. Louis Cardinals
Mike Meyer	RHP	14	438	San Francisco Giants
Dennis Anderson	C	25	746	Florida Marlins
