= Chase Davis =

American baseball player (born 2001)

St. Louis Cardinals
- Outfielder
- Born: December 5, 2001 (age 24); Elk Grove, California, U.S.
- Bats: Left Throws: Left
- Stats at Baseball Reference

Chase Davis (born December 5, 2001) is an American professional baseball outfielder in the St. Louis Cardinals organization.

== Early life and amateur career ==
Davis grew up in Elk Grove, California, and attended Franklin High School. He was rated the best collegiate recruit in the state of California and committed to play college baseball at the University of Arizona. Davis's senior season was canceled due to COVID-19.

Davis played in 27 games with one start during his freshman season in 2021 with the Arizona Wildcats and hit for a .233 average in 30 at-bats with five runs scored, three doubles, one triple, and four RBIs. After the season, he played in the Northwoods League with the La Crosse Loggers. Davis started 62 of Arizona's 63 games in the outfield as a sophomore in 2022 and hit .289 with 56 runs scored, 13 doubles, 18 home runs, and 54 RBIs. After the season, Davis played collegiate summer baseball for the Wareham Gatemen of the Cape Cod Baseball League. He also played for the United States collegiate national team. Davis was named to the watchlist for the Golden Spikes Award due to a strong performance at the beginning of his junior season. Over 57 games for Arizona in 2023, Davis hit .362 with 21 home runs and 74 RBIs.

== Professional career ==
Davis was selected by the St. Louis Cardinals in the first round, with the 21st overall selection, of the 2023 Major League Baseball draft. On July 15, 2023, Davis signed with the Cardinals for an above slot deal worth $3.62 million.

Davis made his professional debut after signing with the Single-A Palm Beach Cardinals, hitting .212 with 23 RBIs over 34 games. He opened the 2024 season with Palm Beach and was promoted to the High-A Peoria Chiefs and the Double-A Springfield Cardinals during the season. In June, Davis was named the Cardinals Minor League Player of the Month. He ended the season batting .252 with 12 home runs, seventy RBIs, and 29 doubles over 112 games between the three clubs. Davis was assigned to Springfield for the entirety of the 2025 season. Across 113 games, he hit .242 with ten home runs and 48 RBIs. Davis returned to Springfield to open the 2026 season. In July, he was promoted to the Triple-A Memphis Redbirds. Davis missed time during the season due to injury and completed a six game rehab assignment. Across 93 games played in 2026, he batted .226 with 15 home runs and 58 RBIs.
