= Dave Stegman =

American baseball player (born 1954)

- Outfielder
- Born: January 30, 1954 (age 71); Inglewood, California, U.S.
- Batted: Right Threw: Right

MLB debut
- September 4, 1978, for the Detroit Tigers

Last MLB appearance
- July 22, 1984, for the Chicago White Sox

MLB statistics
- Batting average: .206
- Home runs: 8
- Runs batted in: 32
- Stats at Baseball Reference

Teams
- Detroit Tigers (1978–1980); New York Yankees (1982); Chicago White Sox (1983–1984)
Medals
Men's baseball
Representing United States
Amateur World Series
Gold medal – first place	1974 St. Petersburg	Team
Pan American Games
Silver medal – second place	1975 Mexico City	Team

David William Stegman (born January 30, 1954) is an American former Major League Baseball outfielder. He played all or part of six seasons in the majors for the Detroit Tigers (1978–1980), New York Yankees (1982) and Chicago White Sox (1983–1984). During his 6 seasons he played in 172 games and had 320 at bats, 39 runs scored, 66 hits, 10 doubles, 2 triples, 8 home runs, 32 RBI, 5 stolen bases, 31 walks, a .206 batting average, a .277 on-base percentage, a .325 slugging percentage, 104 total bases, 4 sacrifice hits and 4 sacrifice flies.

== Amateur career ==
Stegman was originally drafted in the 10th round out of Lompoc High School in 1972 by the Minnesota Twins. However, he opted not to sign and instead went to play college baseball at the University of Arizona. After his junior year, he was drafted twice more, once by the Boston Red Sox in June 1975 and then again by the Atlanta Braves in January 1976, but he returned for his senior season. Then, in June 1976, he was picked with the second pick of the secondary phase by the Tigers.

== Professional career ==
=== Detroit Tigers ===
Stegman was immediately assigned to the Double-A Montgomery Rebels, just two steps below the major leagues. He played 61 games for Montgomery, batting .266 with a .379 on-base percentage, but he failed to hit a home run.

The following season, Stegman again started at Montgomery, posting much better numbers. In 67 games, he hit an impressive .345, with 11 home runs and 59 RBI. His OBP also rose over 100 points, to an excellent .488. This earned him a promotion to the Triple-A Evansville Triplets. His numbers there took a nosedive, batting just .222 in 50 games, although his power numbers were still decent, with 6 home runs.

Stegman returned to Evansville for 1978, this time batting .264 while playing the full season with the Triplets. This earned him a promotion when rosters expanded in September. In his MLB debut, Stegman appeared in 8 games, batting 14 times with 4 hits. In the next-to-last game of the season, Stegman hit his first major league home run on September 30 against the Baltimore Orioles.

The 1979 season looked a lot like 1978 for Stegman, as he spent the entire season with the Triplets, getting called up in September. This time, Stegman got more of a chance, appearing in 12 games with 33 at bats. Although he hit just .194, he did hit three home runs among his six hits.

In 1980, Stegman made the Tigers out of spring training. Serving as a reserve outfielder, he batted just .181 through August 6 before being set back to Evansville. He returned in September, but went just 2-for-14 down the stretch. After the season, he was traded to the San Diego Padres for relief pitcher Dennis Kinney.

=== Padres and Yankees ===
Stegman began the 1981 season in the minors once more, this time with the Hawaii Islanders. However, just 14 games into the season, he was traded a second time, this time to the New York Yankees. He spent the rest of the year with the Columbus Clippers, batting .291 in 90 games. In 1982, Stegman spent nearly the entire season with Columbus, batting .272. He returned to the majors in June, but made just two appearances—both as a pinch runner, before returning to Columbus. He became a free agent after the season.

=== White Sox ===
The Chicago White Sox signed Stegman as a minor league free agent the following January. Once more, he began the season in the minor leagues with the Denver Bears. There, he had his best season statistically at the Triple-A level, batting .334 in 111 games and earning a callup in August. He appeared in 30 games over the remainder of the season, batting just .170 in 53 at bats.

Stegman received one more chance in the majors when he made the White Sox roster in 1984. He batted .261 in 55 games before finishing the season back in Denver. He spent two more seasons in the minors, with the Toronto Blue Jays organization in 1985 and then back with the Yankees in 1986, but never returned to the major leagues.
