= Trevor Crowe =

American baseball player (born 1983)

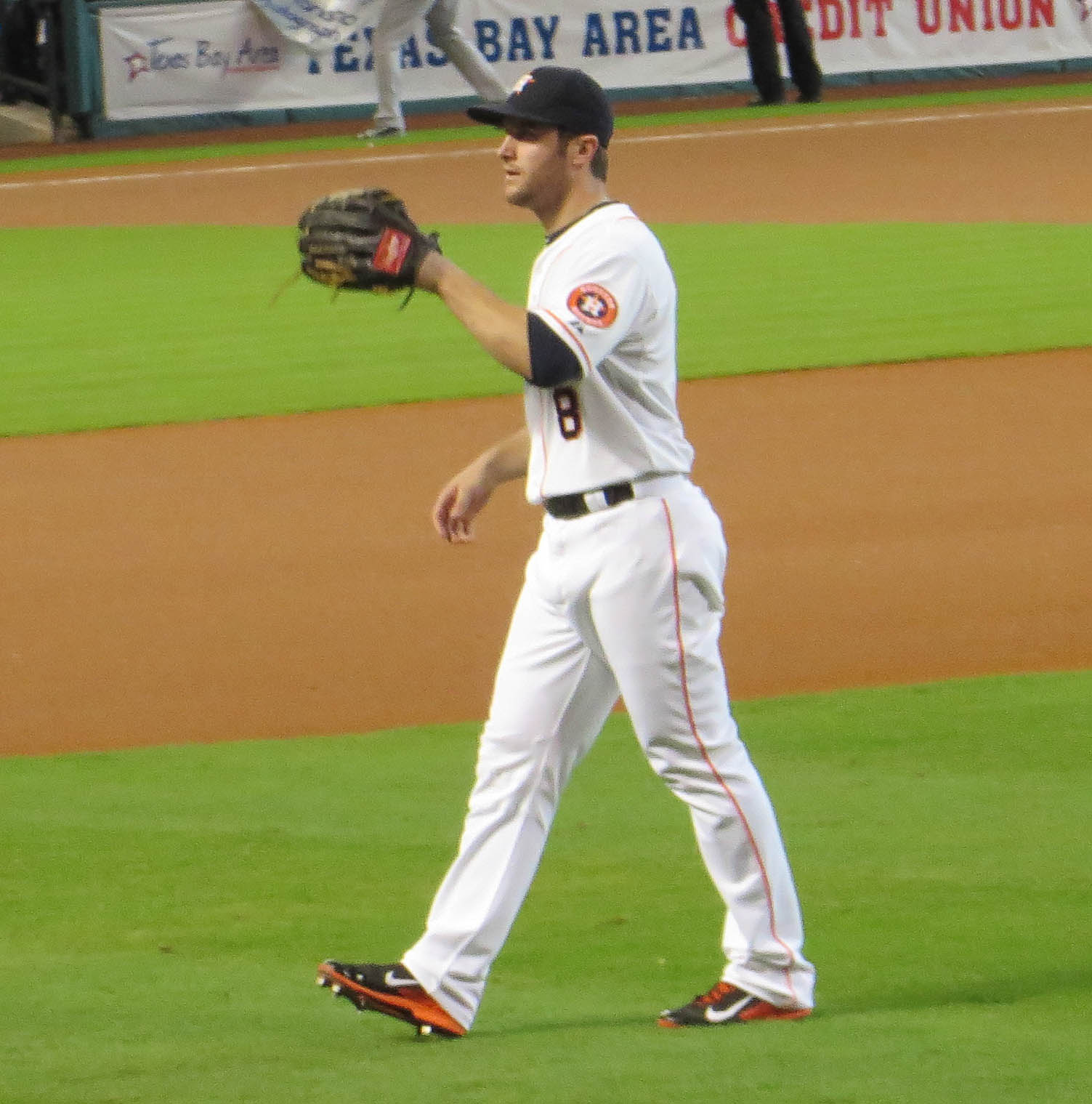
- Crowe with the Houston Astros in 2013
- Outfielder
- Born: November 17, 1983 (age 42); Portland, Oregon, U.S.
- Batted: Switch Threw: Right

MLB debut
- April 9, 2009, for the Cleveland Indians

Last MLB appearance
- September 29, 2013, for the Houston Astros

MLB statistics
- Batting average: .240
- Home runs: 4
- Runs batted in: 68
- Stats at Baseball Reference

Teams
- Cleveland Indians (2009–2011); Houston Astros (2013)
Medals
Men's baseball
Representing United States
World University Championship
Gold medal – first place	2004 Tainan	Team

Trevor Thornton Crowe (born November 17, 1983) is an American former professional baseball outfielder. He played in Major League Baseball (MLB) for the Cleveland Indians and Houston Astros. Prior to playing professionally, Crowe attended the University of Arizona, where he played college baseball for the Arizona Wildcats.

== Amateur career ==
Crowe attended Westview High School, and was selected by the Oakland Athletics in the 20th round of the 2002 Major League Baseball draft. Crowe did not sign with the Athletics, instead enrolled at the University of Arizona, where he played college baseball for the Arizona Wildcats baseball team. In 2003, he played collegiate summer baseball in the Cape Cod Baseball League for the Yarmouth-Dennis Red Sox, and was the starting left-fielder for the East division in the league's annual all-star game. Crowe was named the 2005 Pac-10 Conference Co-Player of the Year, with Jacoby Ellsbury.

An all-around athlete, Crowe was a competitive racquetball player in his teenage years and was one of the top players in the nation.

== Professional career ==
=== Cleveland Indians ===
The Cleveland Indians selected Crowe in the first round, with the 14th overall selection, in the 2005 Major League Baseball draft. Crowe was named to the 2006 Carolina League All-Star game, but was unable to participate due to injury. He started the 2007 season as the Double–A Akron Aeros' starting center fielder. After an unsuccessful experiment at second base beginning in late August 2006, Crowe was moved permanently back to the outfield, rotating between all three outfield positions.

After initially being optioned to the minors on March 28, 2009, Crowe was recalled at the end of spring training due to an injury to David Dellucci and was part of the Indians' Opening Day roster. Crowe started as the right fielder for the Indians in his MLB debut on April 9, against the Texas Rangers at Rangers Ballpark in Arlington. Crowe went 0–for–5 including one strikeout. In 68 games during his rookie campaign, he batted .235/.278/.333 with one home run, 17 RBI, and six stolen bases.

Crowe made 122 appearances for the Indians in 2010, slashing .251/.302/.333 with two home runs, 36 RBI, and 20 stolen bases. He played in 15 games for Cleveland in 2011, going 6–for–28 (.214) with two RBI, three stolen bases, and four walks. On November 2, 2011, Crowe was removed from the 40–man roster and sent outright Triple–A Columbus Clippers.

Crowe played in 38 games for Columbus in 2012, hitting .250/.336/.386 with three home runs, 12 RBI, and eight stolen bases. He was released by the Indians organization on July 16, 2012.

=== Los Angeles Angels of Anaheim ===
On July 17, 2012, Crowe signed a minor league contract with the Los Angeles Angels of Anaheim. He was subsequently assigned to the Triple–A Salt Lake Bees, spending the season with them as a leadoff hitter. In 42 games for the Bees, Crowe slashed .301/.354/.399 with no home runs, 16 RBI, and 10 stolen bases.

=== Houston Astros ===
On November 27, 2012, Crowe signed a minor league contract with the Houston Astros organization. On May 6, 2013, the Astros selected Crowe's contract, adding him to their active roster. In 60 games for Houston, he batted .218/.287/.291 with one home run, 13 RBI, and six stolen bases. On October 17, Crowe was removed from the 40–man roster and sent outright to the Triple–A Oklahoma City RedHawks. He rejected the assignment and elected free agency the following day.

=== Detroit Tigers ===
On January 2, 2014, Crowe signed a minor league contract with the Detroit Tigers. In 66 games for the Triple–A Toledo Mud Hens, he slashed .240/.291/.349 with four home runs, 26 RBI, and eight stolen bases. Crowe was released by the Tigers organization on July 20.

== Personal life ==
In 2017, Crowe purchased a $3.2 million home in Phoenix, Arizona.

In December 2020, Crowe was sentenced to three years of probation and ordered to pay $85,043 in restitution to the Internal Revenue Service for omitting more than $300,000 in income from illegal gambling from his 2015 income tax return. At his sentencing, his attorneys argued that he suffered from opioid addiction and mental illness which contributed to his conduct. He was later sentenced to three months of probation.
