= Jerry Kindall =

American baseball player (1935–2017)

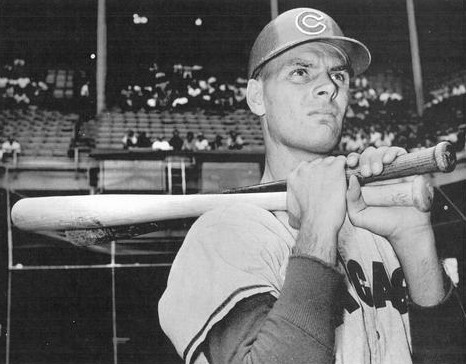
- Kindall in 1961
- Second baseman
- Born: May 27, 1935; St. Paul, Minnesota, U.S.
- Died: December 24, 2017 (aged 82); Tucson, Arizona, U.S.
- Batted: Right Threw: Right

MLB debut
- July 1, 1956, for the Chicago Cubs

Last MLB appearance
- October 2, 1965, for the Minnesota Twins

MLB statistics
- Batting average: .213
- Home runs: 44
- Runs batted in: 198
- Stats at Baseball Reference

Teams
- Chicago Cubs (1956–1958, 1960–1961); Cleveland Indians (1962–1964); Minnesota Twins (1964–1965)

Career highlights and awards
- 4× College World Series champion (1956, 1976, 1980, 1986)

Member of the College

Baseball Hall of Fame
- Induction: 2007

Gerald Donald Kindall (May 27, 1935 – December 24, 2017) was an American professional baseball player and college baseball player and coach. He was primarily a second baseman in Major League Baseball (MLB) who appeared in 742 games played over nine seasons for the Chicago Cubs (1956–58, 1960–61), Cleveland Indians (1962–64), and Minnesota Twins (1964–65). After his playing career, he became the head baseball coach of the University of Arizona Wildcats, winning 860 games and three College World Series (CWS) championships over 24 seasons (1973–1996). Kindall batted and threw right-handed and was listed as 6 feet 2 inches (1.88 m) tall and 175 pounds (79 kg).

Kindall was born in St. Paul, Minnesota, and graduated from Washington High School before attending the University of Minnesota. In 1956, as a student-athlete at Minnesota, his Golden Gophers won the NCAA Division I baseball championship. Twenty years later, Kindall coached the Arizona Wildcats to a CWS victory, becoming the first person to win CWS titles both as a player and as a head coach. He is also the first batter to hit for the cycle in the history of the CWS, along with being the only person to do so until Christian Moore did so in 2024. Kindall was elected to the College Baseball Hall of Fame in 2007.

== Early life and college ==
Gerald Donald Kindall was born on May 27, 1935, to parents Harold “Butch” and Alfield Kindall in St. Paul, Minnesota. He attended Washington High School in St. Paul. As a senior in 1953, he was named the Most Valuable Player of the Minnesota High School Baseball Tournament. After graduating from Washington, he attended the University of Minnesota. Although he had an athletic scholarship to play college basketball, Kindall also played baseball for Minnesota, earning All-America honors in 1956. That year, he batted .381, hit 18 home runs, and recorded 48 runs batted in. He was part of a University of Minnesota team that won the 1956 College World Series, defeating the University of Arizona in the finals. In the tournament, Kindall hit for the cycle. He was the only person to do so in a College World Series, until Christian Moore of Tennessee duplicated the feat in the 2024 College World Series.

== Chicago Cubs (1956–1958, 1960–1961) ==
=== 1956–1957 ===
After Kindall's 1956 College World Series triumph, he signed with the Chicago Cubs as a bonus baby, reportedly for around $50,000. The bonus rule, in place at the time, mandated that such players be kept on the Major League Baseball (MLB) signing club's 25-man roster for two full seasons before they could be optioned to minor league baseball; this often resulted in players getting sparse playing time in their early seasons, as their ballclubs preferred to use the more experienced players. However, the risk of getting less experience was worth it for Kindall. "My dad was working two jobs, 70 hours a week. My mom was in a wheelchair, I had two younger brothers, and my grandfather was living with us,” Kindall later recalled. “It was a handsome offer so I signed, but not before I made a promise to my parents that I would complete my education." By taking classes from the University of Minnesota over his offseasons, Kindall eventually completed a bachelor's degree in English and a master's degree in physical education.

Kindall reported to the Cubs on July 1 and made his major league debut the same day, pinch running for Monte Irvin in a 7–0 victory over the Milwaukee Braves. A few of the older players were not happy to have him around: besides joining the team with a lofty salary rather than first playing for low wages in the minor leagues, Kindall had replaced Ed Winceniak, a popular player who had a strong rapport with the rest of the team. Others were friendly to him, particularly third base coach Pepper Martin, who looked out for the young player when the team was travelling. Kindall's first at bat came as a surprise after several weeks of pinch running; he was asked to hit against Roy Face of the Pittsburgh Pirates because the Cubs had batted around since Kindall pinch ran. "Someone told me before I went up to watch for his forkball," Kindall later recalled, but he saw only fastballs as he struck out on three pitches.

In August, Kindall received more playing time, starting at shortstop from August 11 through August 26 while Ernie Banks was unavailable due to a hand infection. Though he struggled as a hitter, he played well defensively. In 32 games his rookie year, he batted .164 with seven runs scored, nine hits, no home runs, and no RBI.

During the 1957 season, Kindall received most of his playing time at second base and third base, though he also played some games at shortstop. On July 5, he hit his first major league home run, a two-run shot against Bob Buhl in a 7–4 victory over Milwaukee. He continued to struggle offensively; after July 30, he had only three hits in 53 at bats. In 72 games (181 at bats), he batted .160 with 18 runs scored, 29 hits, six home runs, and 12 RBI.

=== 1958–1960 ===
A change to the bonus rule prior to the 1958 season meant that Kindall's half-season in 1956 now counted towards one of his two full seasons, and he was eligible to be optioned to the minors. The Cubs subsequently sent him to the Fort Worth Cats of the Class AA Texas League to work on his hitting. "I was grateful for the major-league experience, but I was glad when they sent me down," Kindall said, eager for the opportunity to get more experience. His batting average increased with Fort Worth, though it was still just .229. In 143 games (512 at bats), he recorded 60 runs scored, 117 hits, 16 home runs, and 65 RBI. Kindall also played three games for the Cubs in 1958, recording a double in six at bats. In 1959, he returned to Fort Worth, now part of the Class AAA American Association. He batted .236 with 70 runs scored, 144 hits, seven home runs, and 42 RBI in 153 games (610 at bats). Kindall said that manager Lou Klein helped him greatly during his time with the Cats.

Not promoted by the Cubs in 1959, Kindall had an impressive spring training for them in 1960. He began the season with the Class AAA Houston Buffaloes of the American Association but joined the Cubs in May, getting many starts at second base throughout the year. New manager Lou Boudreau worked on Kindall's hitting, getting him to shorten his stride and take more of a slap-style swing at pitches. From June 21 through July 3, he batted .439, raising his average to .303 on July 3. However, Kindall only batted. 167 thereafter. In 89 games (246 at bats) with the Cubs, he batted .240 with 17 runs scored, 59 hits, two home runs, and 23 RBI. With Houston in 27 games, he batted .232 with 14 runs scored, 26 hits, three home runs, and nine RBI.

=== 1961 ===
Kindall split time in the middle infield in 1961, playing shortstop for a few games when Banks was moved to left field, and filling in at second base for Don Zimmer. He had four RBI on June 4, including a three-run home run against Jim Brosnan in a 10–7 victory over the Cincinnati Reds. Though his batting average was .273 through July 9, struggles in the latter part of the season brought it down to .242 by season's end. Kindall had another four-RBI game on August 14, contributing a three-run home run against Frank Sullivan in a 9–2 victory over the Philadelphia Phillies. In 96 games (310 at bats), he recorded 37 runs scored, 75 hits, a career-high 22 doubles, nine home runs, and 44 RBI.

With standout youngster Ken Hubbs coming up through the organization, Kindall's roster spot was in jeopardy. Told by the team late in 1961 that he might become the everyday shortstop in 1962, when Banks moved to first base, Kindall was excited to see a November Sporting News article announcing this as the team's plan. Shortly after seeing it, however, he was traded to the Cleveland Indians on November 27, 1961, for pitcher Bobby Locke. During his time with Chicago, Kindall made a lasting contribution to baseball phraseology when he coined the expression “the Friendly Confines of Wrigley Field” to describe the Cubs' stadium.

== Cleveland Indians (1962–1964) ==
Kindall quickly felt at home in Cleveland, where he became the everyday second baseman, a position he held for all of 1962. Through May 11, he was batting .289. Sportswriter Joe Reichler called him "a defensive whiz" in May 1962, observing that he had "steadied the infield" for Cleveland. The greatest offensive moment of his career came that June, when Kindall had eight hits in a four-game series against the New York Yankees. He had four hits on June 16, including a two-run walk-off home run against Jim Coates in the bottom of the ninth inning that turned a 9–8 deficit into a 10–9 victory. The next day, his two-run home run against Bill Stafford in the first game of a doubleheader put Cleveland up 2–0 in an eventual 6–1 victory. The series victory pushed Cleveland past New York into the American League (AL) lead, though they would eventually finish the season in sixth place. As he had the last two years, Kindall did not hit as well in the latter part of the season, finishing with a .232 average. Still, 1962 saw him play in a career-high 154 games and setting personal bests in hits (123), home runs (13) and RBI (55). He led all AL second basemen in assists with 494, also placing third among all AL players with a 2.3 defensive Wins Above Replacement (behind Clete Boyer's 3.2 and Eddie Bressoud's 2.5).

In 1963, Kindall began the season as a reserve player, but he ultimately started over half of the Indians' games, either at second base or at shortstop. On June 14, he played 28 innings of baseball, starting both games of a doubleheader against the Washington Senators and playing all 19 innings of the second game. Against the Red Sox on July 14, he finished a 14-inning game with a walkoff home run against Hal Kolstad to give Cleveland a 4–3 victory. In 86 games (234 at bats), Kindall fielded well but again struggled to hit, batting .205 with 27 runs scored, 48 hits, five home runs, and 20 RBI.

Interim manager George Strickland made Larry Brown Cleveland's starting second baseman in 1964, resulting in limited playing time for Kindall. Through June 11, he had only 28 at bats in 23 games, though he batted .360. On June 11, Kindall was traded to the Minnesota Twins, now his "hometown" team, in a three-way deal. Minnesota traded Lenny Green and Vic Power to the Los Angeles Angels, who traded Frank Kostro to the Twins and Billy Moran to the Indians.

== Minnesota Twins (1964–1965) ==
Kindall was one of about a half-dozen infielders that the Twins tried at second base in 1964; despite the competition, he managed to appear in 62 games for the team that year. He batted .148 with eight runs scored, 19 hits, one home run, and six RBI in 128 at bats. In 85 games combined between Cleveland and Minnesota in 1964, he batted .183 with 13 runs scored, 28 hits, three home runs, and eight RBI.

Kindall's final MLB campaign saw him contribute to the pennant-winning 1965 Twins. He started 101 of the team's 162 games at second base, but he hit only .196 and suffered a hamstring injury that limited his playing time during the pennant drive. Frank Quilici, promoted from the minor leagues in July, began getting more and more of the starts at second base in the season's second half. In 125 games (342 at bats), Kindall recorded 41 runs scored, 67 hits, six home runs, and 36 RBI. He did not appear in the 1965 World Series; Quilici played every inning of the contest, won by the Los Angeles Dodgers in seven games. "While I was healthy in time for the World Series, Quilici was doing such a good job there was no reason to take him out," Kindall recalled.

The leg injury continued to limit Kindall's range in 1966. At the end of 1966 spring training, he was called over to owner Calvin Griffith's trailer. To his surprise, Griffith informed Kindall that he was being released, unless he wanted a minor league assignment. Kindall only wanted to play in the major leagues, however, and after realizing that all the other MLB teams had their rosters finalized, he decided to look for work elsewhere.

== Career statistics ==
As a major leaguer, Kindall was credited with 439 hits, including 83 doubles, nine triples, 44 home runs, and 198 RBI in 742 games. No one since 1920 with at least 2,000 at bats has a lower career batting average than Kindall's .213, but he did have above-average power for a second baseman. Kindall later recalled that he was "a project every season", and that "It was always, 'if we could get Kindall to hit .260, he could be a regular.'" He speculated that his low average was due to a high number of strikeouts, as well as the constant changes to his batting stance. Kindall had some of his best success facing Robin Roberts, against whom he had four home runs. When Roberts once asked Kindall why the batter hit so well against him, Kindall suggested that Roberts "gave [him] good fastballs below the belt." Kindall recalled that after that conversation, Roberts gave him "nothing but belt-high fastballs and curves." Indians teammate Tommy John described him as "a great-field, no-hit second baseman whose glove kept him in the lineup."

== Coaching career and later life ==
Still popular with his alma mater, Kindall was hired by the University of Minnesota in 1966. Initially, athletic director Marsh Ryman created a position as an excuse to hire him, but he soon became an assistant to head coach Dick Siebert and worked with the Golden Gophers through 1971.

In 1972, the University of Arizona was looking to hire a new head baseball coach, as Frank Sancet was retiring at the end of the season. Kindall was one of three finalists, along with Steve Hamilton and Bobby Richardson. When Richardson pulled out, he spoke favorably of both of the other candidates. Kindall believed that Arizona "wound up flipping a coin" to decide between him and Hamilton, but he was ultimately the one hired. After serving as an assistant in 1972, he officially became the head coach in 1973. Ironically, the Arizona Wildcats had been the victims of Kindall's Minnesota Golden Gophers in the finals of the 1956 College World Series.

Under Kindall, the Wildcats posted a win–loss record of 860–579–7; the 860 wins are the most by any coach in team history. The Wildcats reached the College World Series five times, winning NCAA championships in 1976, 1980 and 1986. With the 1976 championship, Kindall became the first person to win a College World Series as both a player and a head coach. He coached future major leaguers such as Terry Francona, Scott Erickson, Trevor Hoffman, J.T. Snow, and Craig Lefferts. Additionally, 34 of his players were named first-team All-Americans. "If I had any success as a college coach, it’s because of the many good things I saw and learned in professional baseball," Kindall said.

Following his retirement as a coach in 1996, Kindall served as a broadcaster for the Wildcats up through the 2016 season. His audience observed that he was particularly talented as a storyteller and analyst. The University of Arizona's baseball field was renamed Jerry Kindall Field at Frank Sancet Stadium in 2004; it continued to serve as their home until 2012, when they moved to Hi Corbett Field. In 2007, he became a member of the College Baseball Hall of Fame, as well as the American Baseball Coaches Association Hall of Fame. He is the author of Baseball: Play the Winning Way and co-editor of The Baseball Coaching Bible.

== Personal life ==
Kindall and his first wife, Georgia, had four children: Betsy, Doug, Bruce and Martha. Georgia was diagnosed with Amyotrophic lateral sclerosis (ALS, also known as Lou Gehrig's disease) in 1984 and succumbed to the disease three years later on June 29. Kindall stopped teaching at the University of Arizona at that time, though he continued to coach baseball. In September 1988, Kindall met a widow named Diane, whom he married on Thanksgiving weekend that year. She had one child from her previous marriage, a daughter named Elise.

Tommy John became friends with Kindall when both were in the Indians organization. Kindall used to take John to church, Youth for Christ meetings, and Fellowship of Christian Athletes (FCA) meetings. "He always played hard and got the most out of his abilities, the kind of worker a youngster should emulate," John recalled. Other teammates and colleagues also considered him a very faithful Christian. The FCA eventually named an award after Kindall, presented each year to the player who best represents Jesus Christ both on and off the field.

Kindall was hospitalized on December 21, 2017, after suffering a major stroke in Tucson, Arizona. He died three days later at the age of 82.
