= Dwight Taylor (baseball) =

American baseball player (born 1960)

- Outfielder
- Born: March 24, 1960 (age 66); Los Angeles, California, U.S.
- Batted: Left Threw: Left

MLB debut
- April 14, 1986, for the Kansas City Royals

Last MLB appearance
- April 23, 1986, for the Kansas City Royals

MLB statistics
- Batting average: .000
- Runs: 1
- Hits: 0
- Stats at Baseball Reference

Teams
- Kansas City Royals (1986)

Dwight Bernard Taylor (born March 24, 1960) is an American former professional baseball outfielder. He played during one season at the major league level for the Kansas City Royals. He was drafted by the Cleveland Indians in the 7th round of the 1981 amateur draft. Taylor, played his first professional season with their Class A Waterloo Indians in 1981 and split his last season in 1992 between the Cincinnati Reds' Double-A Chattanooga Lookouts and Triple-A Nashville Sounds.
