= Preston Guilmet =

American baseball player (born 1987)

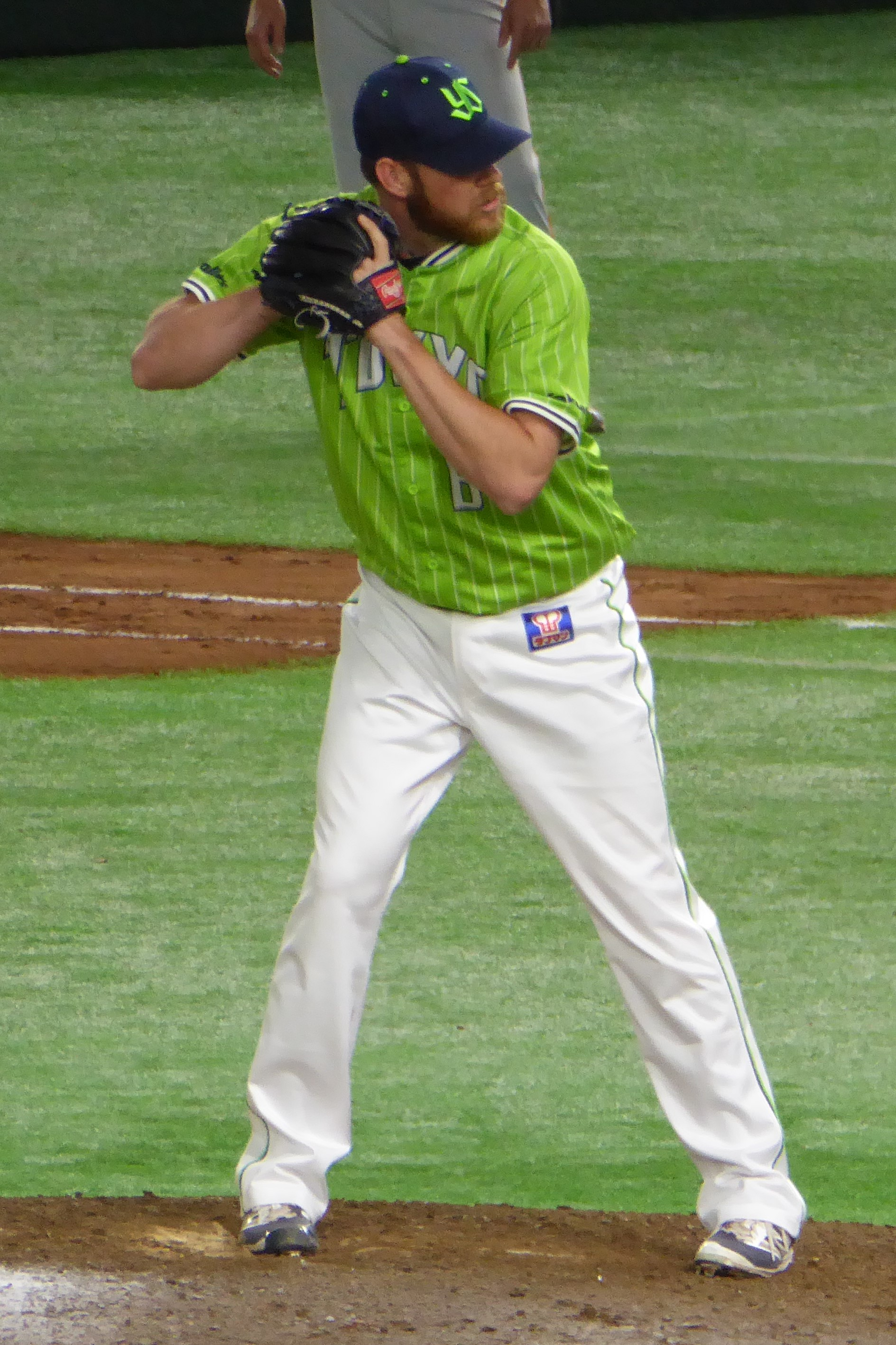
- Guilmet with the Tokyo Yakult Swallows
- Pitcher
- Born: July 27, 1987 (age 38); Roseville, California, U.S.
- Batted: Right Threw: Right

Professional debut
- MLB: July 10, 2013, for the Cleveland Indians
- NPB: April 1, 2017, for the Tokyo Yakult Swallows

Last appearance
- MLB: October 1, 2021, for the Miami Marlins
- NPB: October 3, 2017, for the Tokyo Yakult Swallows

MLB statistics
- Win–loss record: 0–2
- Earned run average: 9.00
- Strikeouts: 28

NPB statistics
- Win–loss record: 1–1
- Earned run average: 3.62
- Strikeouts: 57
- Stats at Baseball Reference

Teams
- Cleveland Indians (2013); Baltimore Orioles (2014); Tampa Bay Rays (2015); Milwaukee Brewers (2015); Tokyo Yakult Swallows (2017); St. Louis Cardinals (2018); Toronto Blue Jays (2018); Miami Marlins (2021)

Preston Blake Guilmet (/ˈɡɪlmɛt/ GIL-met; born July 27, 1987) is an American former professional baseball pitcher. He played in Major League Baseball (MLB) for the Cleveland Indians, Baltimore Orioles, Tampa Bay Rays, Milwaukee Brewers, St. Louis Cardinals, Toronto Blue Jays, and Miami Marlins. He also played in Nippon Professional Baseball (NPB) for the Tokyo Yakult Swallows. He grew up in Roseville, California and graduated from Oakmont High School. He later played college baseball for the University of Arizona.

== Professional career ==
Guilmet attended the University of Arizona from 2006 to 2009. In 2007, he was the Pac-10 Pitcher of the Year. He was drafted by the Oakland Athletics in the 22nd round of the 2008 Major League Baseball draft, but did not sign and returned to Arizona.

=== Cleveland Indians ===
Guilmet was drafted by the Cleveland Indians in the 9th round of the 2009 Major League Baseball draft. He made his professional debut with the Low-A Mahoning Valley Scrappers, pitching to a 6–6 record and 4.09 ERA in 15 appearances with the team. The next year, Guilmet played for the Single-A Lake County Captains, recording a 4–1 record and 2.25 ERA in 30 games with the team. In 2011, he played for the High-A Kinston Indians, posting a 2.16 ERA with 35 saves and 60 strikeouts in 58.1 innings of work. In 2012 for the Double-A Akron Aeros, Guilmet pitched to a 2.39 ERA with 24 saves and 51 strikeouts in 52.2 innings pitched. He began the 2013 season with the Triple-A Columbus Clippers.

Guilmet was selected to the 40-man roster and promoted to the majors for the first time on July 7, 2013. He made his major league debut on July 10 against the Toronto Blue Jays, and was optioned back to Columbus the next day. In his rookie season, Guilmet posted a 10.13 ERA in 4 appearances for Cleveland. On March 30, 2014, Guilmet was designated for assignment by the Indians.

=== Baltimore Orioles ===
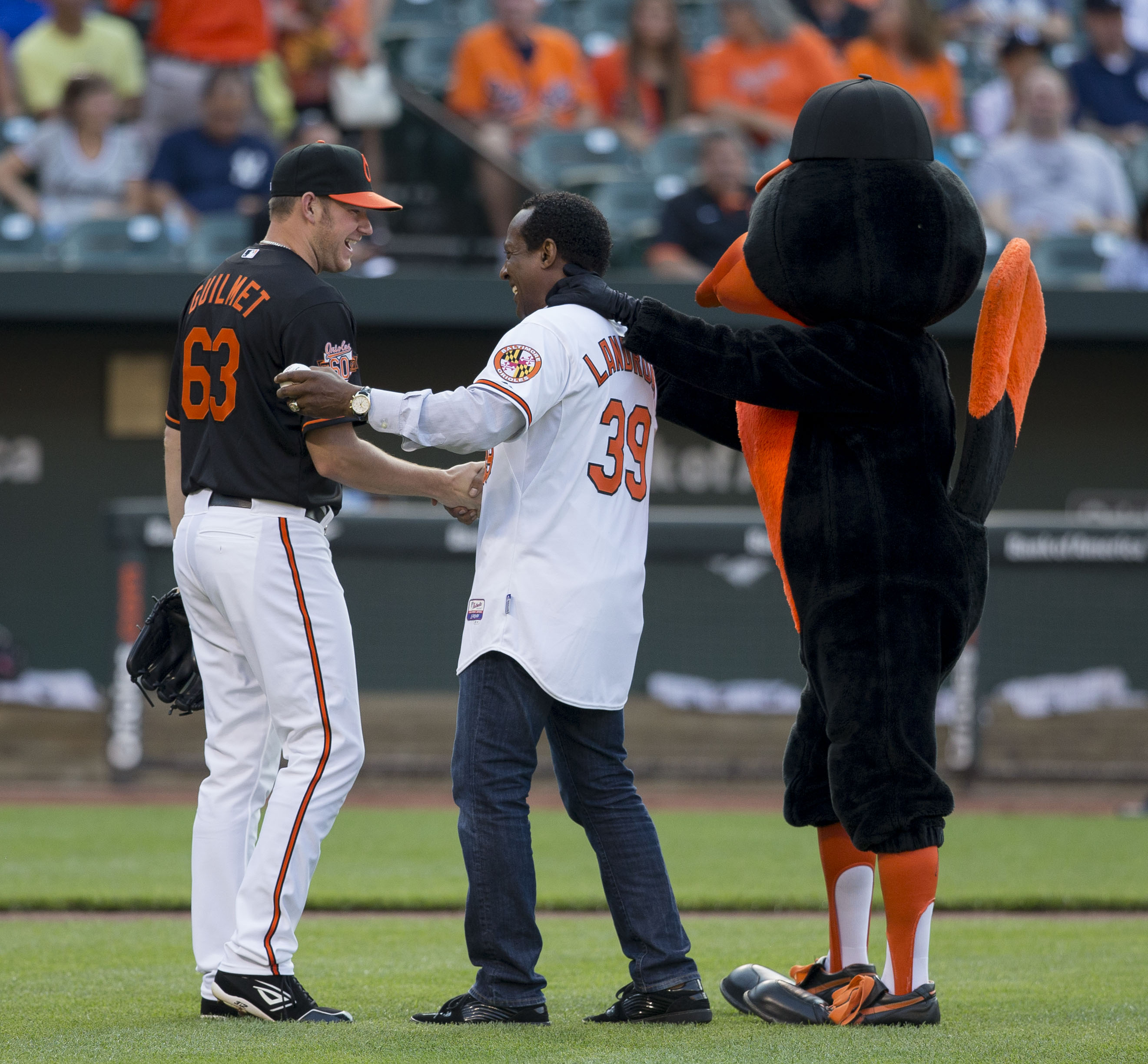
Guilmet, Tito Landrum and the Oriole Bird (left to right) in 2014

On April 7, 2014, Guilmet was traded to the Baltimore Orioles in exchange for Torsten Boss. He spent most of the season with the Triple-A Norfolk Tides where he appeared in 40 games, posting a 4–2 record and 3.91 ERA. After pitching six scoreless innings in his first five games with the Orioles, he picked up his only decision with the ballclub in a 3–1 loss to the Houston Astros at Minute Maid Park on May 29. He made a total of 10 relief appearances with the Orioles, surrendering six earned runs and eight hits in 10 1/3 innings. He was designated for assignment on September 27 when the Orioles needed to make room on its 40-man roster for Alexi Casilla, who had been promoted from the Tides.

=== Toronto Blue Jays ===
On October 3, 2014, Guilmet was traded to the Pittsburgh Pirates in exchange for cash considerations. He was designated for assignment by the Pirates on December 19, and subsequently claimed off waivers by the Toronto Blue Jays on December 23. Guilmet was optioned to the Triple-A Buffalo Bisons on March 15, 2015. In 10 appearances for Buffalo, Guilmet pitched to a 1.26 ERA with 12 strikeouts. On May 10, he was designated for assignment by the Blue Jays.

=== Tampa Bay Rays ===
Guilmet was claimed off waivers by the Tampa Bay Rays on May 13, 2015, and optioned to the Triple-A Durham Bulls. After 4 games with Durham, he was recalled by the Rays on May 24, and optioned back to Durham after that day's game. He was designated for assignment on July 7 after logging a 5.06 ERA in 3 appearances with the Rays and a 2.40 ERA in 13 games for Durham.

=== Los Angeles Dodgers ===
Guilmet was claimed off waivers by the Los Angeles Dodgers on July 10, 2015, and optioned to the Triple-A Oklahoma City Dodgers. The Dodgers designated him for assignment on July 21 after he recorded a 3.00 ERA in 3 games in Triple-A.

=== Milwaukee Brewers ===
The Milwaukee Brewers claimed Guilmet off waivers on July 31, 2015. He was assigned to the Triple-A Colorado Springs Sky Sox. Guilmet made 2 appearances for Milwaukee in 2015, but struggled to a 27.00 ERA before being outrighted to the Triple-A on September 8. On November 6, 2015, he elected free agency.

During the 2015 season, Guilmet played for four different Triple-A organizations, Buffalo, Durham, Oklahoma City and Colorado Springs. He made 39 appearances in the minors and had a 2–2 record with a 2.15 ERA and 46 strikeouts. He also pitched in the majors for Tampa Bay and Milwaukee, compiling a 0–0 record with an 11.05 ERA and six strikeouts in five outings.

=== Detroit Tigers ===
On December 11, 2015, Guilmet signed a minor league contract with the Detroit Tigers organization, and was invited to spring training as a non-roster invitee. He spent the season with the Triple-A Toledo Mud Hens, pitching to a 3–3 record and 2.77 ERA in 65 appearances for the team. Guilmet elected free agency following the season on November 7, 2016.

=== Tokyo Yakult Swallows ===
On November 21, 2016, Guilmet signed a one-year, $600,000 contract with the Tokyo Yakult Swallows of Nippon Professional Baseball (NPB). With Tokyo, Guilmet pitched to a 1–1 record and 3.62 ERA with 57 strikeouts. He became a free agent after the season.

=== St. Louis Cardinals ===
On January 5, 2018, the St. Louis Cardinals signed Guilmet to a minor league contract that included an invitation to Spring Training. He was assigned to the Triple-A Memphis Redbirds to begin the year. St. Louis purchased his contract from Memphis on June 5, 2018, and he made his Cardinals debut the same night at Busch Stadium. He was designated for assignment on June 7. In 21 games with Memphis he was 0–0 with a 0.93 ERA and with a 35/5 K/BB ratio. In 2 games with the Cardinals he was 0–1 with a 22.50 ERA and with 3 strikeouts and no walks. After struggling to a 22.50 ERA in 2 games for St. Louis, Guilmet was designated for assignment on June 7.

=== Toronto Blue Jays (second stint) ===
On June 9, 2018, the Toronto Blue Jays claimed Guilmet off waivers, and designated pitcher Deck McGuire for assignment. Guilmet joined the team in Tampa on June 11. He was designated for assignment on July 4 after struggling to a 9.00 ERA in 6 appearances for the team, and was outrighted to the Buffalo Bisons on July 7. In 3 games with Buffalo, Guilmet went 0–0 with a 5.79 ERA with 2 strikeouts and a walk. Guilmet elected free agency on October 10, 2018.

=== Minnesota Twins ===
On November 20, 2018, Guilmet signed a minor league deal with the Minnesota Twins organization. He did not make the team and was assigned to Triple-A Rochester Red Wings to start the season. In 44 appearances for Rochester, Guilmet registered a 2–6 record and 4.93 ERA with 94 strikeouts in 73 innings of work. He elected free agency following the season on November 4, 2019.

=== Miami Marlins ===
On February 5, 2020, Guilmet signed a minor league contract with the Miami Marlins organization. Guilmet did not play in a game in 2020 due to the cancellation of the minor league season because of the COVID-19 pandemic. He became a free agent on November 2.

On April 12, 2021, Guilmet re-signed with the Marlins organization on a new minor league contract. He was assigned to the Triple-A Jacksonville Jumbo Shrimp to begin the 2021 season, and logged a 4.08 ERA in 9 appearances with the team. On June 12, Guilmet was selected to the active roster. The next day, Guilmet was designated for assignment without making an appearance for the Marlins. He was outrighted to Jacksonville on June 15. Guilmet was re-selected to the active roster on July 10. He was again designated by Miami the next day without making an appearance for the team. He was outrighted to Jacksonville again on July 13. On July 28, Guilmet was once again selected to the Marlins. On August 4, Guilmet cleared waivers and was sent outright to Triple-A Jacksonville. On October 1, Guilmet was again selected to the 40-man roster. On October 22, Guilmet elected free agency.
