= Jerry Kindall Field at Frank Sancet Stadium =

College baseball stadium in Tucson, Arizona

- "Sancet Stadium"
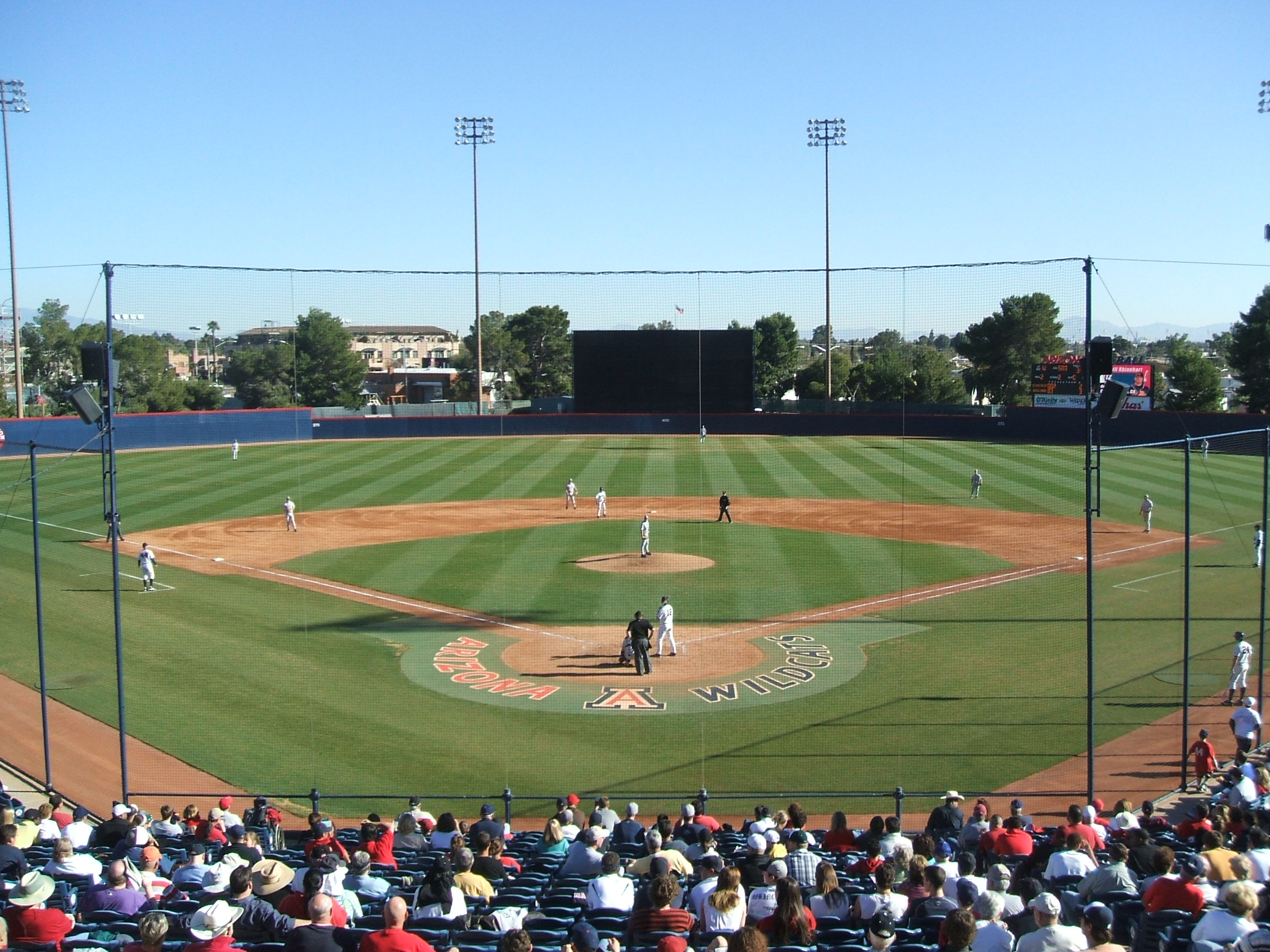
- Hosting Gonzaga in February 2007
- Interactive map of Jerry Kindall Field at Frank Sancet Stadium
- Former names: Wildcat Field (1967–1986)
- Location: University of Arizona; Tucson, Arizona, U.S.
- Coordinates: 32°13′44″N 110°56′47″W
- Owner: University of Arizona
- Operator: University of Arizona
- Capacity: 6,500
- Surface: Natural grass
- Field size: Left field - 360 ft (110 m); Center field - 400 ft (122 m); Right field - 360 ft (110 m)

Construction
- Opened: 1967
- Closed: 2011 (baseball), 2015
- Demolished: 2016, 2018

Tenants
- Arizona Wildcats baseball (NCAA) (1967–2011); Arizona Wildcats football (practice) (2012–2015)

Jerry Kindall Field at Frank Sancet Stadium was a college baseball park in the southwestern United States, located on the campus of the University of Arizona in Tucson, Arizona. Prior to 2012, it was the home field of the Arizona Wildcats of the Pac-10 Conference.

Opened in 1967 and originally called "Wildcat Field," the venue was named after Frank Sancet (head coach from 1950 to 1972) in 1986, and was renamed in 2004 to include former head coach Jerry Kindall. Since 2012, the Wildcat baseball team has played at Hi Corbett Field, a former spring training facility located about three miles (5 km) southeast of campus. The Wildcat football program has used the former baseball field as a football practice facility since the 2012 preseason, and the 2013 football spring game was held there, due to renovations at Arizona Stadium, adjacent to the west.

Located south of the McKale Center, the grandstands were fully demolished in 2018 to clear space for football's new indoor practice facility, the Davis Sports Center. It opened in early 2019 on the western edge of the property, parallel to Arizona Stadium, with natural grass practice fields on the remainder. A monument to Jerry Kindall and Frank Sancet was erected on the site of the former ballpark.

== Stadium facts ==
- Surface: The outfield was Bermuda, while the infield was a Tifgreen (said to be durable in hot weather, a factor during the baseball season in Tucson). The infield consisted of Stabilizer Red dirt, and Stabilizer Clay was used around home plate and on the mound. A new irrigation system was installed in 2007 for the infield grass and dirt. The grounds crews overseeded the field in November with a Perennial Rye, Arnold Palmer II, to prepare it for the season. The area in front of the dugouts was AstroTurf.
- Field dimensions: 360 feet (110 m) down each foul line, 378 feet (115 m) to the power alleys and 400 feet (122 m) to center field. The diamond was aligned southeast (home plate to center field) at an approximate elevation of 2,440 feet (745 m) above sea level.
- Through 2008, Arizona posted a 32-year mark of 820–343–3 (.705) in more than 1,100 games at Sancet Stadium. UA had just three losing records at Sancet Stadium and nearly reached perfection in 1974 with a 37–1 home campaign, and the park hosted four NCAA Regionals (1979, 1980, 1989, 1992).
- Ballpark traditions included the "Sixth Street Slam", when an Arizona player hit it over the right field fence and onto traffic on Sixth Street, a five-lane arterial.
- The visitors' section of the stands was often occupied by members of the Hot Corner, the baseball contingent of the Zona Zoo, Arizona's athletics student section, which has continued at Hi Corbett Field.

== Changes to Sancet Stadium ==
The field was first modernized in 1975. In 1988, a $160,000 scoreboard, complete with a computerized message center, was purchased through advertising contracts with Gatorade and The Arizona Daily Star. Larger dugouts were added in 1990, and the stadium got its own "Green Monster" in 1995 with the installation of a wall designed to block traffic lights from adjacent Sixth Street during night games.

A new, expanded press box was completed in 1997. Changes made in time for the 2006 season included an 11-by-20-foot (3.4 m × 6.1 m) videoboard, new batting cages, and a lawn seating area (similar to those featured in some minor league, and major league spring training, ballparks); the protective wall in right field was turned into the "College World Series" wall, commemorating the Wildcats' fifteen appearances (to that date) in the CWS in Omaha, including three national championship titles (1976, 1980, 1986), all coached by Jerry Kindall. The Wildcats also won in 2012, their first year not at Sancet Stadium.
