= 1985 NCAA Division I baseball season =

Baseball season

- Number of teams: 260

NCAA tournament

College World Series
- Champions: Miami (FL) (2nd title)
- Runners-up: Texas (22nd CWS Appearance)
- Winning coach: Ron Fraser (2nd title)
- MOP: Greg Ellena (Miami (FL))

Seasons
- ← 1984 1986 →

The 1985 NCAA Division I baseball season, play of college baseball in the United States organized by the National Collegiate Athletic Association (NCAA) began in the spring of 1985. The season progressed through the regular season and concluded with the 1985 College World Series. The College World Series, held for the thirty-ninth time in 1985, consisted of one team from each of eight regional competitions and was held in Omaha, Nebraska, at Johnny Rosenblatt Stadium as a double-elimination tournament. Miami (FL) claimed the championship for the second time.

== Realignment and format changes ==
- Nicholls State and Northwestern State departed the Trans America Athletic Conference for the Gulf Star Conference and Southland Conference, respectively.
- The Big South Conference formed, consisting of 8 teams from NCAA Division I, NCAA Division II, and NAIA, and petitioned for Division I status. This was granted in 1986. The members were Armstrong State, Augusta State, Baptist, Campbell, Coastal Carolina, Radford, UNC Asheville, and Winthrop.
- The Association of Mid-Continent Universities instituted division for conference play. The Blue Division consisted of Cleveland State, UIC, and Valparaiso while the Gray Division included Eastern Illinois, Northern Iowa, Southwest Missouri State, and Western Illinois.

== Conference winners ==
This is a partial list of conference champions from the 1985 season. The NCAA sponsored regional competitions to determine the College World Series participants. Five regionals of four teams and three of six each competed in double-elimination tournaments, with the winners advancing to Omaha. 25 teams earned automatic bids by winning their conference championship while 13 teams earned at-large selections.

Conference	Regular season winner	Conference tournament	Tournament venue • city	Tournament winner
Atlantic Coast Conference	Clemson/North Carolina/Virginia	1985 Atlantic Coast Conference baseball tournament	Russ Chandler Stadium • Atlanta, GA	Georgia Tech
Atlantic 10 Conference	East - Temple; West - West Virginia/Penn State	1985 Atlantic 10 Conference baseball tournament	Hawley Field • Morgantown, WV	West Virginia
Big East Conference	North - Connecticut; South - Seton Hall	1985 Big East Conference baseball tournament	Muzzy Field • Bristol, CT	St. John's
Big Eight Conference	Oklahoma State	1985 Big Eight Conference baseball tournament	All Sports Stadium • Oklahoma City, OK	Oklahoma State
Big Ten Conference	East - Michigan; West - Illinois	1985 Big Ten Conference baseball tournament	Ray Fisher Stadium • Ann Arbor, MI	Minnesota
EIBL	Harvard/Princeton	No tournament		
Mid-American Conference	Central Michigan	No tournament		
Mid-Continent	Blue - Valparaiso; Gray - Eastern Illinois	1985 Association of Mid-Continent Universities baseball tournament	Monier Field • Charleston, IL	Southwest Missouri State
Midwestern City Conference	North - Xavier; South - Oral Roberts	1985 Midwestern City Conference baseball tournament	Tulsa, OK	Oral Roberts
Pacific-10 Conference	North - Washington State; South - Stanford	No tournament		
Pacific Coast Athletic Association	North - Fresno State; South - Cal State Fullerton	1985 Pacific Coast Athletic Association Baseball Championship Series	Pete Beiden Field • Fresno, CA	Fresno State
Southeastern Conference	East - Florida; West - LSU	1985 Southeastern Conference baseball tournament	Alex Box Stadium • Baton Rouge, LA	Mississippi State
Southern Conference	North - Appalachian State; South - Davidson	1985 Southern Conference baseball tournament	Hennon Stadium • Cullowhee, North Carolina,	Western Carolina
Southwest Conference	Texas	1985 Southwest Conference baseball tournament	George Cole Field • Fayetteville, AR	Arkansas
Trans America Athletic Conference	East - Georgia Southern; West - Hardin–Simmons	1985 Trans America Athletic Conference baseball tournament	J. I Clements Stadium • Statesboro, GA	Georgia Southern

== Conference standings ==
The following is an incomplete list of conference standings:

1985 Atlantic Coast Conference baseball standings
	Conf.						Overall
Team	W		L		T	PCT	W		L		T	PCT
Clemson ‍†‍‍	9	–	4	–	0	.692	36	–	30	–	1	.545
North Carolina ‍†‍‍	9	–	4	–	0	.692	40	–	17	–	0	.702
No. 23 Virginia ‍†‍‍^{y}	9	–	4	–	0	.692	38	–	16	–	0	.704
NC State ‍‍‍	8	–	5	–	0	.615	29	–	16	–	0	.644
No. 17 Georgia Tech ‍‍‡‍^{y}	6	–	7	–	0	.462	42	–	19	–	0	.689
Duke ‍‍‍	5	–	8	–	0	.385	18	–	15	–	0	.545
Maryland ‍‍‍	5	–	8	–	0	.385	22	–	28	–	0	.440
Wake Forest ‍‍‍	1	–	12	–	0	.077	23	–	23	–	0	.500
† – Conference champion ‡ – Tournament champion y – Invited to the NCAA tournament As of June 30, 1985; Rankings from Collegiate Baseball

1985 Atlantic 10 Conference baseball standings
	Conf.						Overall
Team	W		L		T	PCT	W		L		T	PCT
East
Temple ^{x}‍‍‍	9	–	2	–	0	.818	33	–	18	–	1	.644
UMass ‍‍‍	8	–	4	–	0	.667	20	–	18	–	0	.526
Rutgers ‍‍‍	6	–	6	–	0	.500	25	–	15	–	0	.625
Rhode Island ‍‍‍	5	–	7	–	0	.417	24	–	16	–	1	.598
Saint Joseph's ‍‍‍	2	–	10	–	0	.167	12	–	23	–	0	.343
West
West Virginia ^{x}‍‍‡‍^{y}	9	–	3	–	0	.750	27	–	16	–	0	.628
Penn State ^{x}‍‍‍	9	–	3	–	0	.750	27	–	14	–	0	.659
George Washington ‍‍‍	8	–	4	–	0	.667	18	–	20	–	2	.475
St. Bonaventure ‍‍‍	1	–	8	–	0	.111	17	–	13	–	0	.567
Duquesne ‍‍‍	0	–	9	–	0	.000	15	–	12	–	0	.556
x – Division champion ‡ – Tournament champion y – Invited to the NCAA tournament As of June 30, 1985; Rankings from Collegiate Baseball

1985 Big East Conference baseball standings
	Conf.						Overall
Team	W		L		T	PCT	W		L		T	PCT
North Division
Connecticut ^{x}‍‍‍	11	–	7	–	0	.611	20	–	24	–	1	.456
St. John's ‍‍‡‍^{y}	10	–	7	–	0	.588	32	–	21	–	0	.604
Providence ‍‍‍	8	–	9	–	0	.471	22	–	24	–	1	.479
Boston College ‍‍‍	6	–	12	–	0	.333	12	–	22	–	0	.353
South Division
Seton Hall ^{x}‍‍‍	15	–	3	–	0	.833	44	–	19	–	1	.695
Georgetown ‍‍‍	8	–	10	–	0	.444	27	–	25	–	0	.519
Villanova ‍‍‍	7	–	11	–	0	.389	20	–	24	–	1	.456
Pittsburgh ‍‍‍	6	–	12	–	0	.333	16	–	18	–	0	.471
x – Division champion ‡ – Tournament champion y – Invited to the NCAA tournament As of June 30, 1985; Rankings from Collegiate Baseball

1985 Big East Conference baseball standings
	Conf.						Overall
Team	W		L		T	PCT	W		L		T	PCT
North Division
Connecticut ^{x}‍‍‍	11	–	7	–	0	.611	20	–	24	–	1	.456
St. John's ‍‍‡‍^{y}	10	–	7	–	0	.588	32	–	21	–	0	.604
Providence ‍‍‍	8	–	9	–	0	.471	22	–	24	–	1	.479
Boston College ‍‍‍	6	–	12	–	0	.333	12	–	22	–	0	.353
South Division
Seton Hall ^{x}‍‍‍	15	–	3	–	0	.833	44	–	19	–	1	.695
Georgetown ‍‍‍	8	–	10	–	0	.444	27	–	25	–	0	.519
Villanova ‍‍‍	7	–	11	–	0	.389	20	–	24	–	1	.456
Pittsburgh ‍‍‍	6	–	12	–	0	.333	16	–	18	–	0	.471
x – Division champion ‡ – Tournament champion y – Invited to the NCAA tournament As of June 30, 1985; Rankings from Collegiate Baseball

1985 Big Ten Conference baseball standings
	Conf.						Overall
Team	W		L		T	PCT	W		L		T	PCT
East
Michigan ^{x}‍‍‍^{y}	14	–	2	–	0	.875	55	–	10	–	0	.846
Ohio State ‍‍‍	8	–	8	–	0	.500	29	–	24	–	0	.547
Purdue ‍‍‍	8	–	8	–	0	.500	33	–	25	–	0	.569
Indiana ‍‍‍	8	–	8	–	0	.500	57	–	19	–	1	.747
Michigan State ‍‍‍	2	–	14	–	0	.125	22	–	35	–	0	.386
West
Illinois ^{x}‍‍‍	12	–	4	–	0	.750	46	–	21	–	0	.687
Minnesota ‍‍‡‍^{y}	9	–	7	–	0	.563	33	–	23	–	0	.589
Iowa ‍‍‍	9	–	7	–	0	.563	40	–	20	–	0	.667
Northwestern ‍‍‍	7	–	9	–	0	.438	40	–	18	–	0	.690
Wisconsin ‍‍‍	3	–	13	–	0	.188	28	–	25	–	2	.527
x – Division champion ‡ – Tournament champion y – Invited to the NCAA tournament As of June 30, 1985; Rankings from Collegiate Baseball

1985 Association of Mid-Continent Universities baseball standings
	Conf.						Overall
Team	W		L		T	PCT	W		L		T	PCT
Blue Division
Valparaiso ^{x}‍‍‍	5	–	3	–	0	.625	35	–	21	–	1	.623
Cleveland State ‍‍‍	4	–	4	–	0	.500	23	–	30	–	2	.436
UIC ‍‍‍	3	–	5	–	0	.375	28	–	41	–	1	.407
Gray Division
Eastern Illinois ^{x}‍‍‍	8	–	0	–	0	1.000	33	–	14	–	1	.698
Southwest Missouri State ‍‍‡‍	5	–	3	–	0	.625	24	–	16	–	0	.600
Western Illinois ‍‍‍	7	–	5	–	0	.583	25	–	14	–	1	.638
Northern Iowa ‍‍‍	0	–	12	–	0	.000	15	–	32	–	0	.319
‡ – Tournament champion As of June 30, 1985; Rankings from Collegiate Baseball

1985 NCAA Division I baseball independents standings
	Conf.				Overall
Team	W		L	PCT	W		L	PCT
No. 1 Miami (FL) ‍‍‍^{y}		–		–	64	–	16	.800
Campbell ‍‍‍		–		–	32	–	17	.653
Stetson ‍‍‍		–		–	38	–	23	.623
No. 21 New Orleans ‍‍‍^{y}		–		–	43	–	28	.606
UCF ‍‍‍		–		–	52	–	34	.605
Hofstra ‍‍‍		–		–	13	–	16	.448
Lafayette ‍‍‍		–		–	17	–	23	.425
Richmond ‍‍‍		–		–	20	–	29	.408
y – Invited to the NCAA tournament As of June 30, 1985; Rankings from Collegiate Baseball

1985 Pacific-10 Conference baseball standings
	Conf.						Overall
Team	W		L		T	PCT	W		L		T	PCT
Northern
Washington State ^{x}‍‍‍	16	–	8	–	0	.667	45	–	22	–	0	.672
Washington ‍‍‍	15	–	9	–	0	.625	36	–	12	–	0	.750
No. 29 Oregon State ‍‍‍^{y}	12	–	12	–	0	.500	34	–	17	–	0	.667
Portland State ‍‍‍	12	–	12	–	0	.500	34	–	17	–	0	.667
Gonzaga ‍‍‍	11	–	13	–	0	.458	26	–	23	–	1	.530
Eastern Washington ‍‍‍	10	–	14	–	0	.417	42	–	24	–	0	.636
Portland ‍‍‍	8	–	16	–	0	.333	22	–	22	–	0	.500
Southern
No. 6 Stanford ^{x}‍‍‍^{y}	23	–	7	–	0	.767	47	–	15	–	0	.758
No. 7 Arizona ‍‍‍^{y}	17	–	13	–	0	.567	47	–	22	–	0	.681
No. 28 California ‍‍‍^{y}	17	–	13	–	0	.567	42	–	24	–	0	.636
Arizona State ‍‍‍	15	–	15	–	0	.500	31	–	35	–	0	.470
UCLA ‍‍‍	13	–	17	–	0	.433	34	–	30	–	1	.531
Southern California ‍‍‍	5	–	25	–	0	.167	22	–	44	–	0	.333
x – Division champion y – Invited to the NCAA tournament As of June 30, 1985; Rankings from Collegiate Baseball

1985 Pacific Coast Athletic Association baseball standings
	Conf.				Overall
Team	W		L	PCT	W		L	PCT
North Division
No. 12 Fresno State ^{x}‍‍‡‍^{y}	23	–	7	.767	43	–	22	.662
San Jose State ‍‍‍	16	–	14	.533	24	–	34	.414
UC Santa Barbara ‍‍‍	16	–	14	.533	37	–	22	.627
Pacific ‍‍‍	6	–	21	.222	16	–	36	.308
South Division
Cal State Fullerton ^{x}‍‍‍	21	–	9	.700	36	–	22	.621
UNLV ‍‍‍	17	–	13	.567	40	–	21	.656
UC Irvine ‍‍‍	11	–	16	.407	24	–	31	.436
Long Beach State ‍‍‍	7	–	23	.233	22	–	42	.344
x – Division champion ‡ – Championship Series champion y – Invited to the NCAA tournament As of June 30, 1985; Rankings from Collegiate Baseball

1985 Southeastern Conference baseball standings
	Conf.				Overall
Team	W		L	PCT	W		L	PCT
Eastern Division
No. 11 Florida ^{x}‍‍‍^{y}	15	–	6	.714	43	–	18	.705
Georgia ‍‍‍	11	–	11	.500	33	–	23	.589
Vanderbilt ‍‍‍	10	–	13	.435	35	–	16	.686
Kentucky ‍‍‍	10	–	13	.435	28	–	24	.538
Tennessee ‍‍‍	10	–	13	.435	26	–	23	.531
Western Division
No. 24 LSU ^{x}‍‍‍^{y}	17	–	7	.708	41	–	18	.695
No. 4 Mississippi State ‍‍‡‍^{y}	16	–	8	.667	50	–	15	.769
Auburn ‍‍‍	11	–	12	.478	30	–	22	.577
Alabama ‍‍‍	10	–	14	.417	30	–	23	.566
Ole Miss ‍‍‍	5	–	18	.217	20	–	28	.417
x – Division champion ‡ – Tournament champion y – Invited to the NCAA tournament As of June 30, 1985; Rankings from Collegiate Baseball

1985 Southern Conference baseball standings
	Conf.				Overall
Team	W		L	PCT	W		L	PCT
Northern
Appalachian State ^{x}‍‍‍	14	–	3	.824	35	–	13	.729
Marshall ‍‍‍	10	–	8	.556	26	–	18	.591
VMI ‍‍‍	8	–	10	.444	16	–	24	.400
East Tennessee State ‍‍‍	3	–	14	.176	10	–	31	.244
Southern
Davidson ^{x}‍‍‍	11	–	5	.688	24	–	19	.558
No. 26 Western Carolina ‍‍‡‍^{y}	11	–	6	.647	37	–	35	.514
The Citadel ‍‍‍	8	–	10	.444	29	–	20	.592
Furman ‍‍‍	4	–	13	.235	16	–	29	.356
x – Division champion ‡ – SoCon Tournament champion y – Invited to the NCAA tournament As of June 30, 1985; Rankings from Collegiate Baseball

1985 Southwest Conference baseball standings
	Conf.				Overall
Team	W		L	PCT	W		L	PCT
No. 2 Texas ‍†‍‍^{y}	16	–	5	.762	64	–	14	.821
Baylor ‍‍‍	14	–	7	.667	42	–	13	.764
No. 3 Arkansas ‍‍‡‍^{y}	13	–	7	.650	51	–	15	.773
No. 22 Houston ‍‍‍^{y}	12	–	9	.571	44	–	17	.721
Texas A&M ‍‍‍	12	–	9	.571	39	–	16	.709
TCU ‍‍‍	9	–	12	.429	35	–	17	.673
Rice ‍‍‍	5	–	15	.250	27	–	21	.563
Texas Tech ‍‍‍	2	–	19	.095	18	–	33	.353
† – Conference champion ‡ – Tournament champion y – Invited to the NCAA tournament As of June 30, 1985; Rankings from Collegiate Baseball

1985 Trans America Athletic Conference baseball standings
	Conf.				Overall
Team	W		L	PCT	W		L	PCT
East
Georgia Southern ^{x}‍†‍‡‍	14	–	3	.824	41	–	23	.641
Mercer ‍‍‍	9	–	9	.500	24	–	28	.462
Samford ‍‍‍	7	–	11	.389	21	–	36	.368
Georgia State ‍‍‍	5	–	12	.294	17	–	28	.378
West
Hardin–Simmons ^{x}‍‍‍	9	–	7	.563	30	–	31	.492
Centenary ‍‍‍	7	–	8	.467	27	–	25	.519
Arkansas–Little Rock ‍‍‍	7	–	8	.467	21	–	23	.477
x – Division champion † – Conference champion ‡ – Tournament champion y – Invited to the NCAA tournament As of June 30, 1985; Rankings from Collegiate Baseball

1985 NCAA Division I baseball independents standings
	Conf.				Overall
Team	W		L	PCT	W		L	PCT
No. 1 Miami (FL) ‍‍‍^{y}		–		–	64	–	16	.800
Campbell ‍‍‍		–		–	32	–	17	.653
Stetson ‍‍‍		–		–	38	–	23	.623
No. 21 New Orleans ‍‍‍^{y}		–		–	43	–	28	.606
UCF ‍‍‍		–		–	52	–	34	.605
Hofstra ‍‍‍		–		–	13	–	16	.448
Lafayette ‍‍‍		–		–	17	–	23	.425
Richmond ‍‍‍		–		–	20	–	29	.408
y – Invited to the NCAA tournament As of June 30, 1985; Rankings from Collegiate Baseball

== College World Series ==
The 1985 season marked the thirty ninth NCAA baseball tournament, which culminated with the eight team College World Series. The College World Series was held in Omaha, Nebraska. The eight teams played a double-elimination format, with Miami (FL) claiming their second championship with a 10–6 win over Texas in the final.

Upper round 1
Arkansas	1^{14}
South Carolina	0
Mississippi State	12
Oklahoma State	3
Miami (FL)	17
Stanford	3
Texas	2
Arizona	1

Upper round 2
Arkansas	4
Mississippi State	5
Miami (FL)	1
Texas	2
Lower round 1
South Carolina	11
Oklahoma State	16
Stanford	9
Arizona	2

Upper final
Mississippi State	7
Texas	12
Lower round 2
Miami (FL)	2
Oklahoma State	1
Arkansas	10
Stanford	4

Semifinals
Texas	8^{10}
Arkansas	7
Mississippi State	5
Miami (FL)	6

Final
Texas	1	6
Miami (FL)	2	10
