= 1985 College Baseball All-America Team =

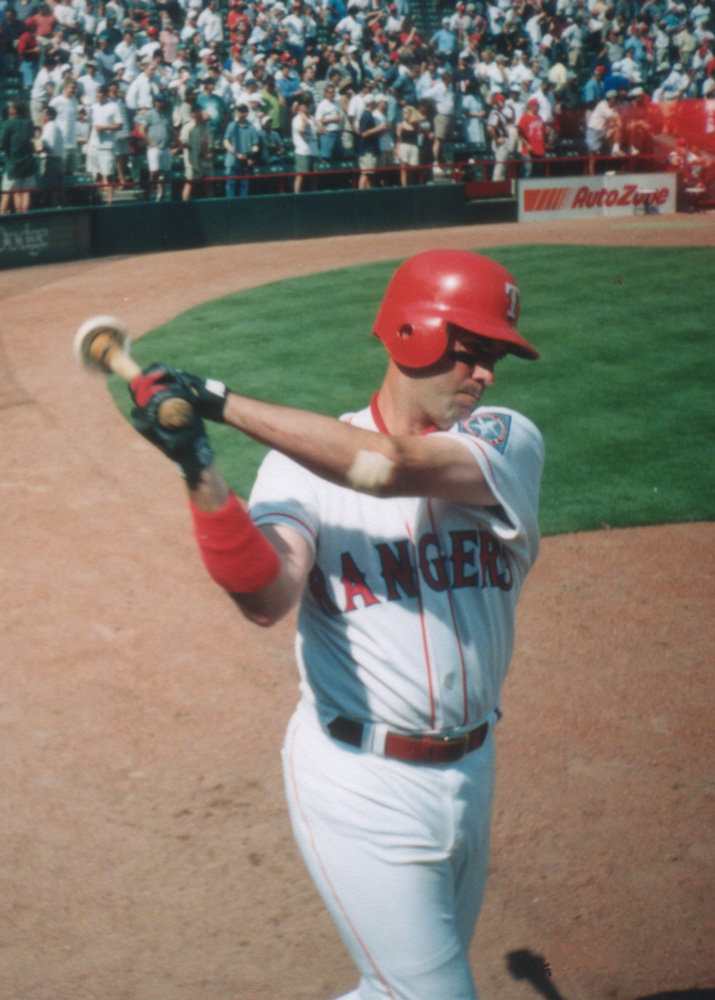
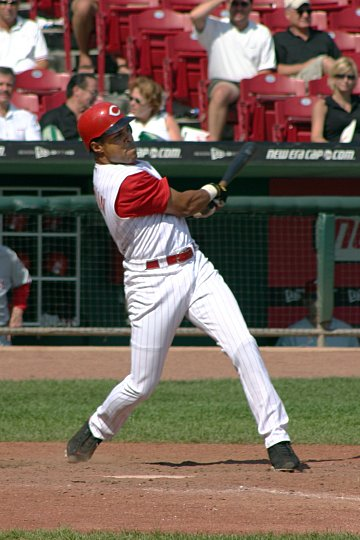
1985 All-Americans included six-time MLB All-Star Will Clark and eleven-time MLB All-Star Barry Larkin.

This is a list of college baseball players named first team All-Americans for the 1985 NCAA Division I baseball season. From 1981 to 1990, there were three generally recognized All-America selectors for baseball: the American Baseball Coaches Association, Baseball America, and The Sporting News. In order to be considered a "consensus" All-American, a player must have been selected by at least two of these.

== Key ==
A	American Baseball Coaches Association
B	Baseball America
S	The Sporting News
	Member of the National College Baseball Hall of Fame
	Consensus All-American – selected by all three organizations
	Consensus All-American – selected by two organizations

== All-Americans ==
Position	Name	School	#	A	B	S	Other awards and honors
Pitcher	Jeff Brantley	Mississippi State	2	✓	✓	—	
Pitcher	Mike Cook	South Carolina	2	✓	✓	—	
Pitcher	Scott Marrett	Pepperdine	1	—	✓	—	
Pitcher	Rick Raether	Miami (FL)	1	—	✓	—	
Pitcher	Greg Swindell	Texas	3	✓	✓	✓	Baseball America Pitcher of the Year
Pitcher	Bobby Witt	Oklahoma	1	—	—	✓	
Catcher	B. J. Surhoff	North Carolina	3	✓	✓	✓	The Sporting News Player of the Year First overall pick in the 1985 MLB draft
First baseman	Will Clark	Mississippi State	3	✓	✓	✓	Golden Spikes Award
Second baseman	Billy Bates	Texas	2	✓	✓	—	
Second baseman	José Mota	Cal State Fullerton	1	—	—	✓	
Shortstop	Barry Larkin	Michigan	3	✓	✓	✓	
Third baseman	Lance Blankenship	California	1	—	—	✓	
Third baseman	Jeff King	Arkansas	1	—	✓	—	
Third baseman	Rob Tomberlin	Western Kentucky	1	✓	—	—	
Outfielder	Brad Bierly	Pepperdine	1	—	✓	—	
Outfielder	Barry Bonds	Arizona State	1	—	—	✓	
Outfielder	Gary Cooper	BYU	1	✓	—	—	
Outfielder / DH	Frank Fazzini	Florida State	2	✓	✓	—	
Outfielder	Chris Gwynn	San Diego State	1	—	—	✓	
Outfielder	Pete Incaviglia	Oklahoma State	3	✓	✓	✓	Baseball America Player of the Year Collegiate Baseball Player of the Year
Outfielder	Rafael Palmeiro	Mississippi State	1	—	—	✓	
Outfielder	Mike Watters	Michigan	1	—	✓	—	
Designated hitter	Dave Otto	Missouri	1	✓	—	—	
Utility player	Jim Fregosi, Jr.	New Mexico	1	✓	—	—	

== See also ==
- List of college baseball awards
