= 1985 Arizona Wildcats baseball team =

American college baseball season

1985 Arizona Wildcats baseball

West II Regional Champions

College World Series
- Conference: Pacific-10 Conference

Ranking
- Coaches: No. 4
- CB: No. 7
- Record: 47–22 (17–13 Pac-10)
- Head coach: Jerry Kindall (13th season)
- Assistant coaches: Jerry Stitt (7th season); Jim Wing (13th season)
- Home stadium: Wildcat Field

1985 Pacific-10 Conference baseball standings
	Conf.						Overall
Team	W		L		T	PCT	W		L		T	PCT
Northern
Washington State ^{x}‍‍‍	16	–	8	–	0	.667	45	–	22	–	0	.672
Washington ‍‍‍	15	–	9	–	0	.625	36	–	12	–	0	.750
No. 29 Oregon State ‍‍‍^{y}	12	–	12	–	0	.500	34	–	17	–	0	.667
Portland State ‍‍‍	12	–	12	–	0	.500	34	–	17	–	0	.667
Gonzaga ‍‍‍	11	–	13	–	0	.458	26	–	23	–	1	.530
Eastern Washington ‍‍‍	10	–	14	–	0	.417	42	–	24	–	0	.636
Portland ‍‍‍	8	–	16	–	0	.333	22	–	22	–	0	.500
Southern
No. 6 Stanford ^{x}‍‍‍^{y}	23	–	7	–	0	.767	47	–	15	–	0	.758
No. 7 Arizona ‍‍‍^{y}	17	–	13	–	0	.567	47	–	22	–	0	.681
No. 28 California ‍‍‍^{y}	17	–	13	–	0	.567	42	–	24	–	0	.636
Arizona State ‍‍‍	15	–	15	–	0	.500	31	–	35	–	0	.470
UCLA ‍‍‍	13	–	17	–	0	.433	34	–	30	–	1	.531
Southern California ‍‍‍	5	–	25	–	0	.167	22	–	44	–	0	.333
x – Division champion y – Invited to the NCAA tournament As of June 30, 1985; Rankings from Collegiate Baseball

The 1985 Arizona Wildcats baseball team represented the University of Arizona in the 1985 NCAA Division I baseball season. The Wildcats played their home games at Wildcat Field. The team was coached by Jerry Kindall in his 13th season at Arizona.

The Wildcats won the West II Regional to advance to the College World Series, where they were defeated by the Stanford Cardinal.

== Personnel ==
=== Roster ===
1985 Arizona Wildcats baseball roster
• David Barker • David Carley • Scott Engle • Joel Estes • David Finley • P. Gains • John Green • Chip Hale • Randal Hayes • Murray Hicks • Tommy Hinzo • Jeff Hird • Derek Huenneke	• Charles Johnson • Paul Kemble • William Kiser • Daniel Krefthefer • Joe Magrane • Jim McDonald • Scott McSparen • Rob Messerli • Gar Millay • Jeff Mooris • Mike Munroe • Jeff Oswalt • S. Reynolds	• Dave Rohde • Mike Senne • David Shermat • Bob Strachen • Chip Stratlon • Steve Strong • Mike Thorell • David Taylor • Todd Trafton • Tom Weiser • Richard Wilson • Kevin Wolfe • Mike Young

=== Coaches ===
1985 Arizona Wildcats baseball coaching staff
- Jerry Kindall - head coach
- Jerry Stitt - assistant coach
- Jim Wing - assistant coach

== 1985 schedule and results ==
1985 Arizona Wildcats baseball game log
Regular season
Date	Opponent	Site/stadium	Score	Overall record	Pac-10 record
Jan 28	Grand Canyon	Wildcat Field • Tucson, AZ	W 16-8	1-0	
Jan 29	at Grand Canyon	Brazell Field • Phoenix, AZ	L 7-14	1-1	
Jan 30	Grand Canyon	Wildcat Field • Tucson, AZ	W 13-3	2-1	
Jan 31	New Mexico State	Wildcat Field • Tucson, AZ	W 13-5	3-1	
Feb 1	New Mexico State	Wildcat Field • Tucson, AZ	W 22-8	4-1	
Feb 2	New Mexico State	Wildcat Field • Tucson, AZ	W 11-3	5-1	
Feb 5	Cal State Dominguez Hills	Wildcat Field • Tucson, AZ	W 13-7	6-1	
Feb 6	Cal State Dominguez Hills	Wildcat Field • Tucson, AZ	W 7-6	7-1	
Feb 7	San Diego	Wildcat Field • Tucson, AZ	W 26-0	8-1	
Feb 8	San Diego	Wildcat Field • Tucson, AZ	W 14-4	9-1	
Feb 9	San Diego	Wildcat Field • Tucson, AZ	W 11-3	10-1	
Feb 11	UTEP	Wildcat Field • Tucson, AZ	W 7-5	11-1	
Feb 12	UTEP	Wildcat Field • Tucson, AZ	W 4-2	12-1	
Feb 14	at Cal State Fullerton	Titan Field • Fullerton, CA	L 4-7	12-2	
Feb 15	at Cal State Fullerton	Titan Field • Fullerton, CA	W 5-2	13-2	
Feb 16	at Cal State Fullerton	Titan Field • Fullerton, CA	W 11-7	14-2	
Feb 18	Santa Clara	Wildcat Field • Tucson, AZ	W 16-5	15-2	
Feb 19	Santa Clara	Wildcat Field • Tucson, AZ	W 7-5	16-2	
Feb 20	Santa Clara	Wildcat Field • Tucson, AZ	L 9-12	16-3	
Feb 22	San Diego State	Wildcat Field • Tucson, AZ	W 13-2	17-3	
Feb 22	San Diego State	Wildcat Field • Tucson, AZ	W 17-6	18-3	
Feb 23	San Diego State	Wildcat Field • Tucson, AZ	W 8-7	19-3	
Feb 25	Westmont	Wildcat Field • Tucson, AZ	W 8-5	20-3	
Feb 26	Westmont	Wildcat Field • Tucson, AZ	W 15-2	21-3	
Mar 1	at UCLA	Jackie Robinson Stadium • Los Angeles, CA	L 2-3	21-4	0-1
Mar 2	at UCLA	Jackie Robinson Stadium • Los Angeles, CA	L 4-15	21-5	0-2
Mar 3	at UCLA	Jackie Robinson Stadium • Los Angeles, CA	L 7-11	21-6	0-3
Mar 4	North Carolina	Wildcat Field • Tucson, AZ	W 13-8	22-6	
Mar 5	North Carolina	Wildcat Field • Tucson, AZ	W 13-5	23-6	
Mar 6	North Carolina	Wildcat Field • Tucson, AZ	L 7-10	23-7	
Mar 8	USC	Wildcat Field • Tucson, AZ	W 8-6	24-7	1-3
Mar 9	USC	Wildcat Field • Tucson, AZ	L 10-12	24-8	1-4
Mar 10	USC	Wildcat Field • Tucson, AZ	W 8-1	25-8	2-4
Mar 15	at California	Evans Diamond • Berkeley, CA	L 2-9	25-9	2-5
Mar 16	at California	Evans Diamond • Berkeley, CA	W 5-3	26-9	3-5
Mar 17	at California	Evans Diamond • Berkeley, CA	W 6-4	27-9	4-5
Mar 19	Colorado State	Wildcat Field • Tucson, AZ	W 15-6	28-9	
Mar 19	Colorado State	Wildcat Field • Tucson, AZ	W 14-1	29-9	
Mar 20	Colorado State	Wildcat Field • Tucson, AZ	W 16-2	30-9	
Mar 23	Stanford	Wildcat Field • Tucson, AZ	L 5-20	30-10	4-6
Mar 23	Stanford	Wildcat Field • Tucson, AZ	L 6-10	30-11	4-7
Mar 24	Stanford	Wildcat Field • Tucson, AZ	W 13-8	31-11	5-7
Mar 29	at Minnesota	Hubert H. Humphrey Metrodome • Minneapolis, MN	L 4-5	31-12	
Mar 30	vs Oral Roberts	Hubert H. Humphrey Metrodome • Minneapolis, MN	L 2-3	31-13	
Mar 30	vs Indiana State	Hubert H. Humphrey Metrodome • Minneapolis, MN	L 2-9	31-14	
Mar 31	at Minnesota	Hubert H. Humphrey Metrodome • Minneapolis, MN	W 6-2	32-14	
Apr 5	Arizona State	Wildcat Field • Tucson, AZ	W 13-12	33-14	6-7
Apr 6	Arizona State	Wildcat Field • Tucson, AZ	L 10-19	33-15	6-8
Apr 7	Arizona State	Wildcat Field • Tucson, AZ	W 11-4	34-15	7-8
Apr 12	at Stanford	Sunken Diamond • Palo Alto, CA	W 7-5	35-15	8-8
Apr 13	at Stanford	Sunken Diamond • Palo Alto, CA	L 8-20	35-16	8-9
Apr 14	at Stanford	Sunken Diamond • Palo Alto, CA	L 1-11	35-17	8-10
Apr 19	at USC	Dedeaux Field • Los Angeles, CA	W 5-2	36-17	9-10
Apr 20	at USC	Dedeaux Field • Los Angeles, CA	W 7-3	37-17	10-10
Apr 21	at USC	Dedeaux Field • Los Angeles, CA	W 11-1	38-17	11-10
Apr 26	California	Wildcat Field • Tucson, AZ	W 9-6	39-17	12-10
Apr 27	California	Wildcat Field • Tucson, AZ	W 5-2	40-17	13-10
Apr 28	California	Wildcat Field • Tucson, AZ	W 9-8	41-17	14-10
May 3	UCLA	Wildcat Field • Tucson, AZ	W 14-11	42-17	15-10
May 4	UCLA	Wildcat Field • Tucson, AZ	W 14-4	43-17	16-10
May 5	UCLA	Wildcat Field • Tucson, AZ	L 4-11	43-18	16-11
May 10	at Arizona State	Packard Stadium • Tempe, AZ	L 3-13	43-19	16-12
May 11	at Arizona State	Packard Stadium • Tempe, AZ	W 7-5	44-19	17-12
May 12	at Arizona State	Packard Stadium • Tempe, AZ	L 3-15	44-20	17-13
NCAA West II Regional
May 22	vs BYU	Pete Beiden Field • Fresno, CA	W 7-3	45-20	
May 23	at Fresno State	Pete Beiden Field • Fresno, CA	W 6-0	46-20	
May 24	at Fresno State	Pete Beiden Field • Fresno, CA	W 10-3	47-20	
College World Series
May 30	vs Texas	Johnny Rosenblatt Stadium • Omaha, NE	L 1-2	47-21	
Jun 2	vs Stanford	Johnny Rosenblatt Stadium • Omaha, NE	L 2-9	47-22	

=== West Regional ===
West II Regional teams
Arizona Wildcats	BYU Cougars	Fresno State Bulldogs	California Golden Bears

== College World Series ==
1985 College World Series teams
Arizona Wildcats	Arkansas Razorbacks	Miami Hurricanes	Mississippi State Bulldogs	Oklahoma State Cowboys	South Carolina Gamecocks	Stanford Cardinal	Texas Longhorns

Upper round 1
Arkansas	1^{14}
South Carolina	0
Mississippi State	12
Oklahoma State	3
Miami (FL)	17
Stanford	3
Texas	2
Arizona	1

Upper round 2
Arkansas	4
Mississippi State	5
Miami (FL)	1
Texas	2
Lower round 1
South Carolina	11
Oklahoma State	16
Stanford	9
Arizona	2

Upper final
Mississippi State	7
Texas	12
Lower round 2
Miami (FL)	2
Oklahoma State	1
Arkansas	10
Stanford	4

Semifinals
Texas	8^{10}
Arkansas	7
Mississippi State	5
Miami (FL)	6

Final
Texas	1	6
Miami (FL)	2	10

== Awards and honors ==
Joe Magrane

- Third Team All-American Baseball America
- First Team All-Pac-10 South Division

Todd Trafton

- First Team All-Pac-10 South Division

== 1985 MLB draft ==
Player	Position	Round	Overall	MLB team
Joe Magrane	LHP	1	18	St. Louis Cardinals
Mike Young	LHP	2	44	Philadelphia Phillies
Tommy Hinzo	INF	1 (6sc)	4	Pittsburgh Pirates
