= 1985 Stanford Cardinal baseball team =

American college baseball season

1985 Stanford Cardinal baseball

Pacific-10 Conference South Division champions West I Regional champions

College World Series, T-5th
- Conference: Pacific 10 Conference

Ranking
- Coaches: No. 5
- CB: No. 6
- Record: 47–15 (23–7 Pac-10)
- Head coach: Mark Marquess (9th season)
- Home stadium: Sunken Diamond

1985 Pacific-10 Conference baseball standings
	Conf.						Overall
Team	W		L		T	PCT	W		L		T	PCT
Northern
Washington State ^{x}‍‍‍	16	–	8	–	0	.667	45	–	22	–	0	.672
Washington ‍‍‍	15	–	9	–	0	.625	36	–	12	–	0	.750
No. 29 Oregon State ‍‍‍^{y}	12	–	12	–	0	.500	34	–	17	–	0	.667
Portland State ‍‍‍	12	–	12	–	0	.500	34	–	17	–	0	.667
Gonzaga ‍‍‍	11	–	13	–	0	.458	26	–	23	–	1	.530
Eastern Washington ‍‍‍	10	–	14	–	0	.417	42	–	24	–	0	.636
Portland ‍‍‍	8	–	16	–	0	.333	22	–	22	–	0	.500
Southern
No. 6 Stanford ^{x}‍‍‍^{y}	23	–	7	–	0	.767	47	–	15	–	0	.758
No. 7 Arizona ‍‍‍^{y}	17	–	13	–	0	.567	47	–	22	–	0	.681
No. 28 California ‍‍‍^{y}	17	–	13	–	0	.567	42	–	24	–	0	.636
Arizona State ‍‍‍	15	–	15	–	0	.500	31	–	35	–	0	.470
UCLA ‍‍‍	13	–	17	–	0	.433	34	–	30	–	1	.531
Southern California ‍‍‍	5	–	25	–	0	.167	22	–	44	–	0	.333
x – Division champion y – Invited to the NCAA tournament As of June 30, 1985; Rankings from Collegiate Baseball

The 1985 Stanford Cardinal baseball team represented Stanford University in the 1985 NCAA Division I baseball season. The Cardinal played their home games at Sunken Diamond. The team was coached by Mark Marquess in his 9th year at Stanford.

The Cardinal won the Pacific-10 Conference South Division and the West I Regional to advanced to the College World Series, where they were defeated by the Arkansas Razorbacks.

== Roster ==
1985 Stanford Cardinal baseball team
Players
Coaches

#	Pos.	Name	B/T	Height	Weight	Year	Home town
	OF	Rubén Amaro Jr.	S/R	—	—	So
	P	Jeff Ballard	/	—	—	Sr
		Don Buford	/	—	—
		Darrell Cass	/	—	—
	P	Ugo Colella	/	—	—
	OF	Toi Cook	/	—	—	So
	OF	Mark Davis	/	—	—	Jr
		Mike DeBenon	/	—	—	Jr
	P	Rick Dietz	/	—	—
	INF	David Esquer	/	—	—	So
		James Gasho	/	—	—
		Ken Green	/	—	—	Jr
	P	David Harris	/	—	—	Sr
		Walt Harris	/	—	—	Jr
	P	Don Hogue	/	—	—
	P	Kevin Kunkel	/	—	—	Jr
		Fred Laningham	/	—	—
	INF	Rick Lundblade	/	—	—	Sr
		Mark Machtolf	/	—	—	So
	P	Jack McDowell	/	—	—	Fr
		David Nelson	/	—	—
		Lee Plemel	/	—	—
	C	John Ramos	/	—	—
		Doug Robbins	/	—	—	Fr
		Lance Shebelut	/	—	—
	INF	Pete Stanicek	/	—	—	Sr
	INF	John Verducci	/	—	—	Sr
	P	Rob Wassenaar	/	—	—	So

Head coach

Mark Marquess

Assistant coach(es)

Legend

- (C) Team captain
- (S) Suspended
- (I) Ineligible
- Injured
- Current redshirt

Roster
Last update: January 10, 2021

== Schedule ==
1985 Stanford Cardinal baseball game log
Regular season
January (2–0)

#	Date	Opponent	Site/stadium	Score	Overall record	Pac-10 record
1	January 29	Saint Mary's	Sunken Diamond • Stanford, California	5–1	1–0	–
2	January 31	at Cal State Fullerton	Titan Field • Fullerton, California	7–13	1–1	–

February (11–3)

#	Date	Opponent	Site/stadium	Score	Overall record	Pac-10 record
3	February 1	at Cal State Fullerton	Titan Field • Fullerton, California	6–3	2–1	–
4	February 5	at Cal State Fullerton	Titan Field • Fullerton, California	6–4	3–1	–
5	February 9	Santa Clara	Sunken Diamond • Stanford, California	3–2	4–1	–
6	February 10	Santa Clara	Sunken Diamond • Stanford, California	5–9	4–2	–
7	February 12	San Francisco	Sunken Diamond • Stanford, California	18–3	5–2	–
8	February 15	at Fresno State	Pete Beiden Field at Bob Bennett Stadium • Fresno, California	8–4	6–2	–
9	February 16	at Fresno State	Unknown • Hayward, California	2–7	6–3	–
10	February 17	Fresno State	Sunken Diamond • Stanford, California	9–3	7–3	–
11	February 18	Fresno State	Sunken Diamond • Stanford, California	10–6	8–3	–
12	February 22	at San Jose State	San Jose Municipal Stadium • San Jose, California	4–0	9–3	–
13	February 23	San Jose State	Sunken Diamond • Stanford, California	7–3	10–3	–
14	February 23	San Jose State	Sunken Diamond • Stanford, California	12–6	11–3	–
15	February 26	Stanislaus State	Sunken Diamond • Stanford, California	7–2	12–3	–
16	February 27	United States International	Sunken Diamond • Stanford, California	4–5	12–4	–

March (10–3)

#	Date	Opponent	Site/stadium	Score	Overall record	Pac-10 record
17	March 1	Arizona State	Sunken Diamond • Stanford, California	9–8	13–4	1–0
18	March 2	Arizona State	Sunken Diamond • Stanford, California	11–7	14–4	2–0
19	March 3	Arizona State	Sunken Diamond • Stanford, California	10–7	15–4	3–0
20	March 8	at UCLA	Jackie Robinson Stadium • Los Angeles, California	5–2	16–4	4–0
21	March 9	at UCLA	Jackie Robinson Stadium • Los Angeles, California	3–2	17–4	5–0
22	March 10	at UCLA	Jackie Robinson Stadium • Los Angeles, California	9–0	18–4	6–0
23	March 15	Southern California	Sunken Diamond • Stanford, California	5–6	18–5	6–1
24	March 16	Southern California	Sunken Diamond • Stanford, California	15–4	19–5	7–1
25	March 17	Southern California	Sunken Diamond • Stanford, California	15–5	20–5	8–1
26	March 23	at Arizona	Jerry Kindall Field at Frank Sancet Stadium • Tucson, Arizona	20–5	21–5	9–1
27	March 23	at Arizona	Jerry Kindall Field at Frank Sancet Stadium • Tucson, Arizona	10–6	22–5	10–1
28	March 24	at Arizona	Jerry Kindall Field at Frank Sancet Stadium • Tucson, Arizona	8–13	22–6	10–2
29	March 28	at UC Santa Barbara	Caesar Uyesaka Stadium • Santa Barbara, California	2–4	22–7	10–2

April (12–4)

#	Date	Opponent	Site/stadium	Score	Overall record	Pac-10 record
30	April 2	at San Jose State	San Jose Municipal Stadium • San Jose, California	8–5	23–7	10–2
31	April 4	at California	Evans Diamond • Berkeley, California	7–1	24–7	11–2
32	April 5	California	Sunken Diamond • Stanford, California	9–1	25–7	12–2
33	April 6	at California	Evans Diamond • Berkeley, California	8–10	25–8	12–3
34	April 9	at UC Davis	Unknown • Davis, California	20–5	26–8	12–3
35	April 12	Arizona	Sunken Diamond • Stanford, California	5–7	26–9	12–4
36	April 13	Arizona	Sunken Diamond • Stanford, California	20–8	27–9	13–4
37	April 13	Arizona	Sunken Diamond • Stanford, California	11–1	28–9	14–4
38	April 19	UCLA	Sunken Diamond • Stanford, California	4–3	29–9	15–4
39	April 20	UCLA	Sunken Diamond • Stanford, California	6–9	29–10	15–5
40	April 21	UCLA	Sunken Diamond • Stanford, California	9–8	30–10	16–5
41	April 22	at Pacific	Billy Hebert Field • Stockton, California	5–4	31–10	16–5
42	April 26	at Southern California	Dedeaux Field • Los Angeles, California	16–1	32–10	17–5
43	April 27	at Southern California	Dedeaux Field • Los Angeles, California	13–9	33–10	18–5
44	April 28	at Southern California	Dedeaux Field • Los Angeles, California	14–5	34–10	19–5
45	April 30	at Santa Clara	Buck Shaw Stadium • Santa Clara, California	11–8	35–10	19–5

May (8–2)

#	Date	Opponent	Site/stadium	Score	Overall record	Pac-10 record
46	May 3	at Arizona State	Packard Stadium • Tempe, Arizona	15–8	36–10	20–5
47	May 4	at Arizona State	Packard Stadium • Tempe, Arizona	8–13	36–11	20–6
48	May 5	at Arizona State	Packard Stadium • Tempe, Arizona	15–10	37–11	21–6
49	May 7	at Saint Mary's	Louis Guisto Field • Moraga, California	14–7	38–11	21–6
50	May 8	Cal Poly	Sunken Diamond • Stanford, California	12–0	39–11	21–6
51	May 9	San Francisco State	Sunken Diamond • Stanford, California	15–0	40–11	21–6
52	May 14	at Santa Clara	Stephen Schott Stadium • Santa Clara, California	17–7	41–11	21–6
53	May 17	California	Sunken Diamond • Stanford, California	7–1	42–11	22–6
54	May 18	at California	Evans Diamond • Berkeley, California	5–4	43–11	23–6
55	May 19	California	Sunken Diamond • Stanford, California	6–12	43–12	23–7

Postseason
NCAA West I Regional (3–1)

#	Date	Opponent	Site/stadium	Score	Overall record	Pac-10 record
56	May 24	Oregon State	Sunken Diamond • Stanford, California	17–3	44–12	23–7
57	May 25	Nebraska	Sunken Diamond • Stanford, California	9–8	45–12	23–7
58	May 26	Pepperdine	Sunken Diamond • Stanford, California	1–5	45–13	23–7
59	May 27	Pepperdine	Sunken Diamond • Stanford, California	7–1	46–13	23–7

College World Series (1–2)

#	Date	Opponent	Site/stadium	Score	Overall record	Pac-10 record
60	June 1	vs Miami (FL)	Johnny Rosenblatt Stadium • Omaha, Nebraska	3–17	46–14	23–7
61	June 2	vs Arizona	Johnny Rosenblatt Stadium • Omaha, Nebraska	9–2	47–14	23–7
62	June 6	vs Arkansas	Johnny Rosenblatt Stadium • Omaha, Nebraska	4–10	47–15	23–7

== Awards and honors ==
Jeff Ballard

- All-Pac-10 South Division
- Third Team All-American Baseball America

Mark Davis

- All-Pac-10 South Division

Rick Lundblade

- Pac-10 Conference South Division Player of the Year
- All-Pac-10 South Division
- Second Team All-American Baseball America

Jack McDowell

- Co-Freshman of the Year Baseball America

Pete Stanicek

- All-Pac-10 South Division

John Verducci

- All-Pac-10 South Division
