= 1985 Southwest Conference baseball tournament =

- Teams: 4
- Format: Double-elimination tournament
- Finals site: George Cole Field; Fayetteville, AR
- Champions: Arkansas (1st title)
- Winning coach: Norm DeBriyn (1st title)

1985 Southwest Conference baseball standings
	Conf.				Overall
Team	W		L	PCT	W		L	PCT
No. 2 Texas ‍†‍‍^{y}	16	–	5	.762	64	–	14	.821
Baylor ‍‍‍	14	–	7	.667	42	–	13	.764
No. 3 Arkansas ‍‍‡‍^{y}	13	–	7	.650	51	–	15	.773
No. 22 Houston ‍‍‍^{y}	12	–	9	.571	44	–	17	.721
Texas A&M ‍‍‍	12	–	9	.571	39	–	16	.709
TCU ‍‍‍	9	–	12	.429	35	–	17	.673
Rice ‍‍‍	5	–	15	.250	27	–	21	.563
Texas Tech ‍‍‍	2	–	19	.095	18	–	33	.353
† – Conference champion ‡ – Tournament champion y – Invited to the NCAA tournament As of June 30, 1985; Rankings from Collegiate Baseball

The 1985 Southwest Conference baseball tournament was the league's annual postseason tournament used to determine the Southwest Conference's (SWC) automatic bid to the 1985 NCAA Division I baseball tournament. The tournament was held from May 17 through 19 at George Cole Field on the campus of the University of Arkansas in Fayetteville, AR.

The number 3 seed Arkansas Razorbacks went 3–0 to win the team's first SWC tournament under head coach Norm DeBriyn.

== Format and seeding ==
The tournament featured the top four finishers of the SWC's eight teams in a double-elimination tournament.

Place	Team	Conference				Overall			Seed
Place	Team	W	L	%	GB	W	L	%	Seed
1	Texas	16	5	.762	-	64	14	.821	1
2	Baylor	14	7	.667	2	42	13	.764	2
3	Arkansas	13	7	.650	2.5	51	15	.773	3
4	Houston	12	9	.571	4	44	17	.721	4
5	Texas A&M	12	9	.571	4	39	16	.709	-
6	TCU	9	12	.429	7	35	17	.673	-
7	Rice	5	15	.250	10.5	27	21	.563	-
8	Texas Tech	2	19	.095	14	18	33	.353	-

== Tournament ==
Upper round 1
1	Texas	5
4	Houston	0
2	Baylor	4
3	Arkansas	6
Lower round 1
4	Houston	5
2	Baylor	4

Upper final
1	Texas	5
3	Arkansas	9
Lower final
1	Texas	14
4	Houston	6

Final
3	Arkansas	10	–
1	Texas	6	–
