= Big West Conference baseball tournament =

College baseball conference championship

- Conference baseball championship
- Sport: Baseball
- Conference: Big West Conference
- Number of teams: 5
- Format: Double elimination with a play-in game
- Played: 1985, 1995–1998, 2025–present
- Current champion: Cal Poly (2026)
- Most championships: Cal State Fullerton (2); Cal Poly
- TV partner: ESPN+

Host stadiums
- Goodwin Field (1996, 1998, 2025); Blair Field (1995, 1997); Anteater Ballpark (2026); ONT Field (2027); Pete Beiden Field (1985)

Host locations
- Fullerton, California (1996, 1998, 2025); Long Beach, California (1995, 1997); Fresno, California (1985); Irvine, California (2026); Ontario, California (2027)

The Big West Conference baseball tournament is the conference championship tournament for the NCAA Division I Big West Conference. The winner of the tournament receives the conference's automatic bid to the NCAA Division I baseball tournament.

The Big West previously played a standalone edition of the tournament in 1985, when it was known as the Pacific Coast Athletic Association, and four consecutive editions from 1995 to 1998 before it was scrapped. In 2025, the Big West reintroduced the tournament with a five-team, modified double elimination format that includes a single elimination game in the first round.

== History ==
In 1985, the Pacific Coast Athletic Association staged the Baseball Championship Series, a best-of-three championship at Pete Beiden Field in Fresno, California. The Fresno State Bulldogs, the regular season winners of the conference's north division, defeated the Cal State Fullerton Titans, south division winners, in two games. The conference did not renew the championship series for the next season.

In 1995, the Big West introduced a four-team double elimination tournament, with the first edition being won by the Cal State Fullerton Titans, eventual national champions that year. The iteration of the tournament lasted for four consecutive years, with two editions at Blair Field and two at Titan Field, and it was scrapped after the 1998 season.

The Big West reintroduced the tournament for the 2025 season, held at Goodwin Field (formerly Titan Field) and a rotating slate of venues in the years after. Anteater Ballpark will host in 2026 and Blair Field will host in 2027. They were the last major conference without a conference tournament. Blair Field as host was later scrapped for unknown reasons. The conference later announced that ONT Field in Ontario, California would be the new host for the 2027 tournament.

The current iteration of the tournament see the top five finishers from the regular season seeded one through five based on conference winning percentage. Seeds No. 1, No. 2, and No. 3 received a bye into the double elimination bracket, while No. 4 and No. 5 battled in a single elimination the first round.

== Champions ==
=== By year ===
| Year | Champion | Site | MVP |
|---|---|---|---|
| 1985 | Fresno State | Pete Beiden Field • Fresno, CA | Not awarded |
| 1995 | Cal State Fullerton | Blair Field • Long Beach, CA | Not awarded |
| 1996 | UNLV | Titan Field • Fullerton, CA | Not awarded |
| 1997 | Cal State Fullerton | Blair Field • Long Beach, CA | Not awarded |
| 1998 | Long Beach State | Titan Field • Fullerton, CA | Not awarded |
| 2025 | Cal Poly | Goodwin Field • Fullerton, CA | Ryan Fenn, Cal Poly |
| 2026 | Cal Poly | Anteater Ballpark • Irvine, CA | Nick Bonn, Cal Poly |
| 2027 | | ONT Field • Ontario, CA | |
