= 1985 Pacific Coast Athletic Association Baseball Championship Series =

American college baseball tournament

1985 Pacific Coast Athletic Association baseball tournament
- Teams: 2
- Format: Best of three series
- Finals site: Pete Beiden Field; Fresno, CA
- Champions: Fresno State (1st title)
- Winning coach: Bob Bennett (1st title)

1985 Pacific Coast Athletic Association baseball standings
	Conf.				Overall
Team	W		L	PCT	W		L	PCT
North Division
No. 12 Fresno State ^{x}‍‍‡‍^{y}	23	–	7	.767	43	–	22	.662
San Jose State ‍‍‍	16	–	14	.533	24	–	34	.414
UC Santa Barbara ‍‍‍	16	–	14	.533	37	–	22	.627
Pacific ‍‍‍	6	–	21	.222	16	–	36	.308
South Division
Cal State Fullerton ^{x}‍‍‍	21	–	9	.700	36	–	22	.621
UNLV ‍‍‍	17	–	13	.567	40	–	21	.656
UC Irvine ‍‍‍	11	–	16	.407	24	–	31	.436
Long Beach State ‍‍‍	7	–	23	.233	22	–	42	.344
x – Division champion ‡ – Championship Series champion y – Invited to the NCAA tournament As of June 30, 1985; Rankings from Collegiate Baseball

The 1985 Pacific Coast Athletic Association Baseball Championship Series, pitted the regular season division champions to determine the Pacific Coast Athletic Association baseball champion for the 1985 season. Fresno State and Cal State Fullerton met in a best of three series at Fresno State's Pete Beiden Field on May 17–18, 1985.

This was the league's first postseason championship event, and also the first year that the league and the West Coast Conference ended their partnership in baseball by dissolving their joint divisions. The PCAA is now known as the Big West Conference.

Fresno State claimed wins in the first two games to win the conference championship and the conference's automatic bid to the 1985 NCAA Division I baseball tournament.

== Format and teams ==
The division winners from the league's pair of four team divisions from the regular season met in the best of three series held at the home field of the division winner with the better conference record.

Team	W	L	PCT	GB
North Division
Fresno State	23	7	.767	–
San Jose State	16	14	.533	7
UC Santa Barbara	16	14	.533	7
Pacific	6	21	.200	15.5

Team	W	L	PCT	GB
South Division
Cal State Fullerton	21	9	.700	–
UNLV	17	13	.567	4
UC Irvine	11	16	.367	8.5
Long Beach State	7	23	.233	14

== Game results ==
May 17, 1985
Team	R
Cal State Fullerton	7
#18 Fresno State	9

May 18, 1985
Team	R
Cal State Fullerton	6
#18 Fresno State	14
