= 1985 Trans America Athletic Conference baseball tournament =

American college baseball tournament

- Teams: 2
- Format: Double-elimination
- Finals site: J. I. Clements Stadium; Statesboro, Georgia
- Champions: Georgia Southern (2nd title)
- Winning coach: Jack Stallings (2nd title)
- MVP: Craig Cooper (Georgia Southern)

1985 Trans America Athletic Conference baseball standings
	Conf.				Overall
Team	W		L	PCT	W		L	PCT
East
Georgia Southern ^{x}‍†‍‡‍	14	–	3	.824	41	–	23	.641
Mercer ‍‍‍	9	–	9	.500	24	–	28	.462
Samford ‍‍‍	7	–	11	.389	21	–	36	.368
Georgia State ‍‍‍	5	–	12	.294	17	–	28	.378
West
Hardin–Simmons ^{x}‍‍‍	9	–	7	.563	30	–	31	.492
Centenary ‍‍‍	7	–	8	.467	27	–	25	.519
Arkansas–Little Rock ‍‍‍	7	–	8	.467	21	–	23	.477
x – Division champion † – Conference champion ‡ – Tournament champion y – Invited to the NCAA tournament As of June 30, 1985; Rankings from Collegiate Baseball

The 1985 Trans America Athletic Conference baseball tournament was held at J. I. Clements Stadium on the campus of Georgia Southern in Statesboro, Georgia, on May 6 and 7. This was the seventh tournament championship held by the Trans America Athletic Conference, in its seventh year of existence. Georgia Southern won their second tournament championship.

== Format and seeding ==
The winner of each of the conference's two divisions met in a best of three series.

Team	W	L	Pct.	GB	Seed
East
Georgia Southern	14	3	.824	—	1E
Mercer	9	9	.500	5.5	—
Georgia State	7	11	.389	7.5	—
Samford	5	12	.294	9	—

Team	W	L	Pct.	GB	Seed
West
Hardin–Simmons	9	7	.563	—	1W
Centenary	7	8	.467	1.5	—
Arkansas–Little Rock	7	8	.467	1.5	—

== Bracket ==
Finals
1W	Hardin–Simmons	1	6	—
1E	Georgia Southern	3	10	—

== All-Tournament Team ==
The following players were named to the All-Tournament Team. An MVP was named for the first time in 1985.

POS	Player	School
P	Phil Dale	Georgia Southern
P	Rich Klemke	Hardin–Simmons
C	Greg McMullen	Georgia Southern
1B	Craig Cooper	Georgia Southern
2B	Jeff Shireman	Georgia Southern
SS	Steve Arias	Hardin–Simmons
3B	Joe Piazza	Hardin–Simmons
OF	Shane Gravens	Hardin–Simmons
OF	Bobby Aiken	Georgia Southern
OF	Mike Shepherd	Georgia Southern
DH	Rob Haranda	Georgia Southern

=== Most Valuable Player ===
Craig Cooper was named Tournament Most Valuable Player. Cooper was a first baseman for Georgia Southern.
