= 1985 Big Ten baseball tournament =

1985 Big Ten Conference baseball tournament
- Teams: 4
- Format: Double-elimination
- Finals site: Ray Fisher Stadium; Ann Arbor, MI
- Champions: Minnesota (2nd title)
- Winning coach: John Anderson (2nd title)
- MVP: John Beckman (Minnesota)

1985 Big Ten Conference baseball standings
	Conf.						Overall
Team	W		L		T	PCT	W		L		T	PCT
East
Michigan ^{x}‍‍‍^{y}	14	–	2	–	0	.875	55	–	10	–	0	.846
Ohio State ‍‍‍	8	–	8	–	0	.500	29	–	24	–	0	.547
Purdue ‍‍‍	8	–	8	–	0	.500	33	–	25	–	0	.569
Indiana ‍‍‍	8	–	8	–	0	.500	57	–	19	–	1	.747
Michigan State ‍‍‍	2	–	14	–	0	.125	22	–	35	–	0	.386
West
Illinois ^{x}‍‍‍	12	–	4	–	0	.750	46	–	21	–	0	.687
Minnesota ‍‍‡‍^{y}	9	–	7	–	0	.563	33	–	23	–	0	.589
Iowa ‍‍‍	9	–	7	–	0	.563	40	–	20	–	0	.667
Northwestern ‍‍‍	7	–	9	–	0	.438	40	–	18	–	0	.690
Wisconsin ‍‍‍	3	–	13	–	0	.188	28	–	25	–	2	.527
x – Division champion ‡ – Tournament champion y – Invited to the NCAA tournament As of June 30, 1985; Rankings from Collegiate Baseball

The 1985 Big Ten Conference baseball tournament was held at Ray Fisher Stadium on the campus of the University of Michigan in Ann Arbor, Michigan, from May 17 through 19. The top two teams from the regular season in each division participated in the double-elimination tournament, the fifth annual tournament sponsored by the Big Ten Conference to determine the league champion. Minnesota won their second tournament championship and earned the Big Ten Conference's automatic bid to the 1985 NCAA Division I baseball tournament

== Format and seeding ==
The 1985 tournament was a 4-team double-elimination tournament, with seeds determined by conference regular season winning percentage within each division. The top seed from each division played the second seed from the opposite division in the first round. Ohio State and Minnesota claimed the second seeds from their respective divisions by tiebreakers.

Team	W	L	PCT	GB	Seed
East Division
Michigan	14	2	.875	–	1E
Ohio State	8	8	.500	6	2E
Purdue	8	8	.500	6	–
Indiana	8	8	.500	6	–
Michigan State	2	14	.125	12	–
West Division
Illinois	12	4	.750	–	1W
Minnesota	9	7	.563	3	2W
Iowa	9	7	.563	3	–
Northwestern	7	9	.438	5	–
Wisconsin	3	13	.188	9	–

== Tournament ==
Upper round 1
1E	Michigan	10
2W	Minnesota	11
1W	Illinois	2
2E	Ohio State	3
Lower round 1
1E	Michigan	11^{11}
1W	Illinois	10

Upper final
2W	Minnesota	8
2E	Ohio State	5
Lower final
2E	Ohio State	3
1E	Michigan	1

Final
2W	Minnesota	5
2E	Ohio State	3

== All-Tournament Team ==
The following players were named to the All-Tournament Team.

Pos	Name	School
P	Mike Clarkin	Minnesota
P	Bill Cunningham	Ohio State
C	Greg Ivarone	Illinois
1B	Alex Bauer	Minnesota
2B	C. J. Beshke	Michigan
SS	Barry Larkin	Michigan
3B	Mike Pherson	Minnesota
OF	John Beckman	Minnesota
OF	Jim Orsag	Illinois
OF	Pat Pohl	Minnesota
DH	Ken Hayward	Michigan

=== Most Outstanding Player ===
Jon Beckman was named Most Outstanding Player. Beckman was an outfielder for Minnesota.
