= 1985 Big East Conference baseball tournament =

American college baseball tournament

- Teams: 4
- Format: Double-elimination
- Finals site: Muzzy Field; Bristol, CT
- Champions: St. John's (1st title)
- Winning coach: Joe Russo (1st title)
- MVP: Joe Armeni (St. John's)

1985 Big East Conference baseball standings
	Conf.						Overall
Team	W		L		T	PCT	W		L		T	PCT
North Division
Connecticut ^{x}‍‍‍	11	–	7	–	0	.611	20	–	24	–	1	.456
St. John's ‍‍‡‍^{y}	10	–	7	–	0	.588	32	–	21	–	0	.604
Providence ‍‍‍	8	–	9	–	0	.471	22	–	24	–	1	.479
Boston College ‍‍‍	6	–	12	–	0	.333	12	–	22	–	0	.353
South Division
Seton Hall ^{x}‍‍‍	15	–	3	–	0	.833	44	–	19	–	1	.695
Georgetown ‍‍‍	8	–	10	–	0	.444	27	–	25	–	0	.519
Villanova ‍‍‍	7	–	11	–	0	.389	20	–	24	–	1	.456
Pittsburgh ‍‍‍	6	–	12	–	0	.333	16	–	18	–	0	.471
x – Division champion ‡ – Tournament champion y – Invited to the NCAA tournament As of June 30, 1985; Rankings from Collegiate Baseball

The 1985 Big East baseball tournament was held at Muzzy Field in Bristol, Connecticut. This was the inaugural Big East baseball tournament, and was won by the St. John's Redmen. As a result, St. John's earned the Big East Conference's automatic bid to the 1985 NCAA Division I baseball tournament.

== Format and seeding ==
The 1985 Big East baseball tournament was a 4 team double elimination tournament. The top two teams from each division, based on conference winning percentage only, earned berths in the tournament. Each division winner played the opposite division's runner up in the first round.

Team	W	L	Pct.	GB	Seed
North Division
Connecticut	11	7	.611	–	1N
St. John's	10	7	.588	.5	2N
Providence	8	9	.471	2.5	–
Boston College	6	12	.333	5	–
South Division
Seton Hall	15	3	.833	–	1S
Georgetown	8	10	.444	7	2S
Villanova	7	11	.389	8	–
Pittsburgh	6	12	.333	9	–

== Tournament ==
First round
1N	Connecticut	11*
2S	Georgetown	9*
1S	Seton Hall	3
2N	St. John's	5
Lower round 1
2S	Georgetown	1
1S	Seton Hall	6

Semi-finals
1N	Connecticut	5
2N	St. John's	6
Lower final
1N	Connecticut	5
1S	Seton Hall	8

Finals
2N	St. John's	4	7*
1S	Seton Hall	5	6*

* - Indicates game required extra innings.

== All-Tournament Team ==
The following players were named to the All-Tournament team.

Position	Player	School
1B	Jerry LaPenta	Connecticut
2B	Tony Bonura	St. John's
3B	Jeff Riggs	Seton Hall
SS	Joe Armeni	Seton Hall
C	Lou Bianco	St. John's
OF	Bob Bellini	St. John's
OF	Bob Schepis	Seton Hall
OF	Steve Carvello	Seton Hall
DH	Pete Petrone	Seton Hall
P	John Tanner	St. John's

== Jack Kaiser Award ==
Joe Armeni was the winner of the 1985 Jack Kaiser Award. Armeni was a shortstop for Seton Hall.
