= 1985 Southeastern Conference baseball tournament =

- Teams: 4
- Format: Four-team double elimination tournament
- Finals site: Alex Box Stadium (1938); Baton Rouge, Louisiana
- Champions: Mississippi State (2nd title)
- Winning coach: Ron Polk (2nd title)
- MVP: Gene Morgan (Mississippi State)

1985 Southeastern Conference baseball standings
	Conf.				Overall
Team	W		L	PCT	W		L	PCT
Eastern Division
No. 11 Florida ^{x}‍‍‍^{y}	15	–	6	.714	43	–	18	.705
Georgia ‍‍‍	11	–	11	.500	33	–	23	.589
Vanderbilt ‍‍‍	10	–	13	.435	35	–	16	.686
Kentucky ‍‍‍	10	–	13	.435	28	–	24	.538
Tennessee ‍‍‍	10	–	13	.435	26	–	23	.531
Western Division
No. 24 LSU ^{x}‍‍‍^{y}	17	–	7	.708	41	–	18	.695
No. 4 Mississippi State ‍‍‡‍^{y}	16	–	8	.667	50	–	15	.769
Auburn ‍‍‍	11	–	12	.478	30	–	22	.577
Alabama ‍‍‍	10	–	14	.417	30	–	23	.566
Ole Miss ‍‍‍	5	–	18	.217	20	–	28	.417
x – Division champion ‡ – Tournament champion y – Invited to the NCAA tournament As of June 30, 1985; Rankings from Collegiate Baseball

The 1985 Southeastern Conference baseball tournament was held at Alex Box Stadium in Baton Rouge, LA from May 9 through 11. Mississippi State won the tournament and earned the Southeastern Conference's automatic bid to the 1985 NCAA tournament.

== Regular season results ==
Team	W	L	Pct	GB	Seed
Eastern Division
Florida	15	6	.714	—	1
Georgia	11	11	.500	4.5	4
Vanderbilt	10	13	.435	6	—
Kentucky	10	13	.435	6	—
Tennessee	10	13	.435	6	—

Team	W	L	Pct	GB	Seed
Western Division
LSU	17	7	.708	—	2
Mississippi State	16	8	.667	1	3
Auburn	11	12	.478	5.5	—
Alabama	10	14	.417	7	—
Ole Miss	5	18	.217	11.5	—

== Tournament ==
First round
3	Mississippi State	8
1	Florida	3
4	Georgia	8
2	LSU	6
Lower round 1
1	Florida	5
2	LSU	2

Semi-finals
3	Mississippi State	2
4	Georgia	0
Lower final
1	Florida	8
4	Georgia	9

Finals
3	Mississippi State	8	-
4	Georgia	3	-

== All-Tournament Team ==
Position	Player	School
1B	Mike Stanley	Florida
2B	Gator Thiesen	Mississippi State
3B	John Scott	Mississippi State
SS	Jeff Reboulet	LSU
C	Roark McDonald	Mississippi State
OF	Bobby Thigpen	Mississippi State
OF	Dan Van Cleve	Mississippi State
OF	Ron Wenrich	Georgia
UT	Tim Touma	Florida
P	Jeff Brantley	Mississippi State
P	Gene Morgan	Mississippi State
MVP	Gene Morgan	Mississippi State

== See also ==
- College World Series
- NCAA Division I Baseball Championship
- Southeastern Conference baseball tournament
