= 1985 Association of Mid-Continent Universities baseball tournament =

- Teams: 4
- Format: Double-elimination
- Finals site: Monier Field; Charleston, Illinois
- Champions: Southwest Missouri State (2nd title)
- Winning coach: Keith Guttin (2nd title)

1985 Association of Mid-Continent Universities baseball standings
	Conf.						Overall
Team	W		L		T	PCT	W		L		T	PCT
Blue Division
Valparaiso ^{x}‍‍‍	5	–	3	–	0	.625	35	–	21	–	1	.623
Cleveland State ‍‍‍	4	–	4	–	0	.500	23	–	30	–	2	.436
UIC ‍‍‍	3	–	5	–	0	.375	28	–	41	–	1	.407
Gray Division
Eastern Illinois ^{x}‍‍‍	8	–	0	–	0	1.000	33	–	14	–	1	.698
Southwest Missouri State ‍‍‡‍	5	–	3	–	0	.625	24	–	16	–	0	.600
Western Illinois ‍‍‍	7	–	5	–	0	.583	25	–	14	–	1	.638
Northern Iowa ‍‍‍	0	–	12	–	0	.000	15	–	32	–	0	.319
‡ – Tournament champion As of June 30, 1985; Rankings from Collegiate Baseball

The 1985 Association of Mid-Continent Universities Tournament took place from May 10 through 12. The top 4 regular season finishers of the league's seven teams met in the double-elimination tournament held at Monier Field, home of the Eastern Illinois in Charleston, Illinois. Southwest Missouri State won the tournament for the second time.

== Format and seeding ==
The top two teams from each division advanced to the tournament. The top seed from each division played the second seed from the opposite division in the second round.

Blue Division
Team	W	L	Pct.	GB	Seed
Valparaiso	5	3	.625	—	1B
Cleveland State	4	4	.500	1	2B
UIC	3	5	.375	2	—

Gray Division
Team	W	L	Pct.	GB	Seed
Eastern Illinois	8	0	1.000	—	1G
Southwest Missouri State	5	3	.625	3	2G
Western Illinois	7	5	.583	3	—
Northern Iowa	0	12	.000	10	—

== Tournament ==
First round
1B	Valparaiso	1
2G	Southwest Missouri State	2
1G	Eastern Illinois	5
2B	Cleveland State	2
Lower round 1
1B	Valparaiso	17
2B	Cleveland State	7

Semi-finals
2G	Southwest Missouri State	4
1G	Eastern Illinois	2
Lower final
1G	Eastern Illinois	11
1B	Valparaiso	2

Finals
2G	Southwest Missouri State	3	—
1G	Eastern Illinois	2	—
