= 1985 Texas Longhorns baseball team =

American college baseball season

1985 Texas Longhorns baseball

Southwest Conference champions

College World Series, runner-up
- Conference: Southwest Conference
- CB: No. 2
- Record: 64–14 (16–5 SWC)
- Head coach: Cliff Gustafson (18th year)
- Home stadium: Disch–Falk Field

1985 Southwest Conference baseball standings
	Conf.				Overall
Team	W		L	PCT	W		L	PCT
No. 2 Texas ‍†‍‍^{y}	16	–	5	.762	64	–	14	.821
Baylor ‍‍‍	14	–	7	.667	42	–	13	.764
No. 3 Arkansas ‍‍‡‍^{y}	13	–	7	.650	51	–	15	.773
No. 22 Houston ‍‍‍^{y}	12	–	9	.571	44	–	17	.721
Texas A&M ‍‍‍	12	–	9	.571	39	–	16	.709
TCU ‍‍‍	9	–	12	.429	35	–	17	.673
Rice ‍‍‍	5	–	15	.250	27	–	21	.563
Texas Tech ‍‍‍	2	–	19	.095	18	–	33	.353
† – Conference champion ‡ – Tournament champion y – Invited to the NCAA tournament As of June 30, 1985; Rankings from Collegiate Baseball

The 1985 Texas Longhorns baseball team represented the University of Texas at Austin in the 1985 NCAA Division I baseball season. The Longhorns played their home games at Disch–Falk Field. The team was coached by Cliff Gustafson in his 18th season at Texas.

The Longhorns reached the College World Series final, but were eliminated by Miami (FL).

== Personnel ==
=== Roster ===
1985 Texas Longhorns roster
Pitchers: 10 - Curt Krippner; 17 - Lanny Hengst; 19 - Daniel Pena; 21 - Greg Swindell; 22 - James Harris; 23 - Kevin Garner; 27 - Dennis Cook; 28 - Mike Poehl; 29 - Bruce Ruffin; 31 - Mark Petkovsek; Catchers: 8 - Mike Anderson; 9 - Robby Byers; 6- Mark Worley; 14 - Chuck Oertli; 36 - Bud Ray	Infielders: 1 - Billy Bates; 2 - Coby Kerlin; 15 - Dodd Johnson; 24 - Rusty Richards; 35 - Bobby Behnsch; 4 - Richard Parker; Outfielders: 6 - David Denny; 11 - Mike Simon; 13 - Scott Vondemkamp; 15 - Doug Hodo; 23 - Kevin Garner; 25 - David Wrzesinski; 27 - Dennis Cook	Unknown

=== Coaches ===
1985 Texas Longhorns baseball coaching staff
- Cliff Gustafson - Head coach - 18th year
- Bill Bethea - Assistant coach - 16th year
- Clint Thomas - Assistant coach - 6th year
- Deron Gustafson - Assistant coach - 2nd year
- Managers- Kevin Kebedoux, Richard Peterson

== Schedule ==
1985 Texas Longhorns baseball game log
Regular season
February

Date	Opponent	Site/stadium	Score	Overall Record	SWC Record
February 15	Texas Lutheran	Disch–Falk Field • Austin, TX	W 5–0	1–0	
February 15	Texas Lutheran	Disch–Falk Field • Austin, TX	W 8–1	2–0	
February 16	Texas–Arlington	Disch–Falk Field • Austin, TX	W 13–0	3–0	
February 16	Texas–Arlington	Disch–Falk Field • Austin, TX	L 13–14	3–1	
February 17	Texas–Arlington	Disch–Falk Field • Austin, TX	L 1–7	3–2	
February 17	Texas–Arlington	Disch–Falk Field • Austin, TX	W 18–6	4–2	
February 22	at Arizona State	Packard Stadium • Tempe, AZ	W 13–7^{13}	5–2	
February 23	at Arizona State	Packard Stadium • Tempe, AZ	W 9–5	6–2	
February 24	at Arizona State	Packard Stadium • Tempe, AZ	W 6–5^{10}	7–2	

March

Date	Opponent	Site/stadium	Score	Overall Record	SWC Record
March 1	St. Mary's (TX)	Disch–Falk Field • Austin, TX	W 14–10	8–2	
March 1	St. Mary's (TX)	Disch–Falk Field • Austin, TX	W 11–6	9–2	
March 2	Oklahoma	Disch–Falk Field • Austin, TX	L 5–6	9–3	
March 3	Oklahoma	Disch–Falk Field • Austin, TX	W 2–1	10–3	
March 4	Cal State Fullerton	Disch–Falk Field • Austin, TX	W 5–1	11–3	
March 5	Cal State Fullerton	Disch–Falk Field • Austin, TX	W 4–3^{17}	12–3	
March 6	Cal State Fullerton	Disch–Falk Field • Austin, TX	W 10–7	13–3	
March 8	Kansas State	Disch–Falk Field • Austin, TX	W 4–1	14–3	
March 8	Kansas State	Disch–Falk Field • Austin, TX	W 14–5	15–3	
March 9	Kansas State	Disch–Falk Field • Austin, TX	W 9–1	16–3	
March 9	Kansas State	Disch–Falk Field • Austin, TX	W 11–0	17–3	
March 10	Emporia State	Disch–Falk Field • Austin, TX	W 2–0	18–3	
March 10	Emporia State	Disch–Falk Field • Austin, TX	W 18–1	19–3	
March 11	Emporia State	Disch–Falk Field • Austin, TX	W 6–2	20–3	
March 11	Emporia State	Disch–Falk Field • Austin, TX	W 13–0	21–3	
March 12	Hardin–Simmons	Disch–Falk Field • Austin, TX	W 2–0	22–3	
March 12	Hardin–Simmons	Disch–Falk Field • Austin, TX	W 16–6	23–3	
March 13	Dallas Baptist	Disch–Falk Field • Austin, TX	W 20–4	24–3	
March 13	Dallas Baptist	Disch–Falk Field • Austin, TX	W 13–3	25–3	
March 14	Dallas Baptist	Disch–Falk Field • Austin, TX	W 10–0	26–3	
March 14	Dallas Baptist	Disch–Falk Field • Austin, TX	W 12–2	27–3	
March 16	Oklahoma City	Disch–Falk Field • Austin, TX	W 4–3	28–3	
March 16	Oklahoma City	Disch–Falk Field • Austin, TX	W 4–0	29–3	
March 17	Mankato State	Disch–Falk Field • Austin, TX	W 15–1	30–3	
March 17	Mankato State	Disch–Falk Field • Austin, TX	W 10–2	31–3	
March 23	at Arkansas	George Cole Field • Fayetteville, AR	L 4–5	31–4	0–1
March 24	at Arkansas	George Cole Field • Fayetteville, AR	L 1–2	31–5	0–2
March 24	at Arkansas	George Cole Field • Fayetteville, AR	W 13–3	32–5	1–2
March 25	at Oklahoma	L. Dale Mitchell Baseball Park • Norman, OK	L 3–6	32–6	
March 29	TCU	Disch–Falk Field • Austin, TX	W 5–0	33–6	2–2
March 30	TCU	Disch–Falk Field • Austin, TX	L 2–4	33–7	2–3
March 30	TCU	Disch–Falk Field • Austin, TX	W 10–5	34–7	3–3

April

Date	Opponent	Site/stadium	Score	Overall Record	SWC Record
April 2	Lubbock Christian	Disch–Falk Field • Austin, TX	L 4–7	34–8	
April 2	Lubbock Christian	Disch–Falk Field • Austin, TX	W 14–0	35–8	
April 5	at Baylor	Ferrell Field • Waco, TX	W 5–1	36–8	4–3
April 6	at Baylor	Ferrell Field • Waco, TX	L 3–8	36–9	4–4
April 6	at Baylor	Ferrell Field • Waco, TX	L 3–10	36–10	4–5
April 9	Southwestern	Disch–Falk Field • Austin, TX	W 6–1	37–10	
April 9	Southwestern	Disch–Falk Field • Austin, TX	W 14–3	38–10	
April 12	Rice	Disch–Falk Field • Austin, TX	W 6–5	39–10	5–5
April 14	Rice	Disch–Falk Field • Austin, TX	W 5–4	40–10	6–5
April 14	Rice	Disch–Falk Field • Austin, TX	W 9–0	41–10	7–5
April 15	Oklahoma State	Disch–Falk Field • Austin, TX	W 9–4	42–10	
April 15	Oklahoma State	Disch–Falk Field • Austin, TX	W 13–12	43–10	
April 19	Texas Tech	Disch–Falk Field • Austin, TX	W 9–2	44–10	8–5
April 20	Texas Tech	Disch–Falk Field • Austin, TX	W 16–15	45–10	9–5
April 20	Texas Tech	Disch–Falk Field • Austin, TX	W 8–2	46–10	10–5
April 26	at Texas A&M	Olsen Field • College Station, TX	W 9–5	47–10	11–5
April 27	at Texas A&M	Olsen Field • College Station, TX	W 9–2	48–10	12–5
April 27	at Texas A&M	Olsen Field • College Station, TX	W 8–7	49–10	13–5

May

Date	Opponent	Site/stadium	Score	Overall Record	SWC Record
May 4	Houston	Disch–Falk Field • Austin, TX	W 8–0	50–10	14–5
May 4	Houston	Disch–Falk Field • Austin, TX	W 15–4	51–10	15–5
May 5	Houston	Disch–Falk Field • Austin, TX	W 11–9	52–10	16–5
May 11	New Orleans	Disch–Falk Field • Austin, TX	W 4–1	53–10	
May 12	New Orleans	Disch–Falk Field • Austin, TX	W 15–3	54–10	

Postseason
SWC Tournament

Date	Opponent	Site/stadium	Score	Overall Record	SWCT Record
May 17	Houston	George Cole Field • Fayetteville, AR	W 5–0	55–10	1–0
May 18	Arkansas	George Cole Field • Fayetteville, AR	L 5–9	55–11	1–1
May 19	Houston	George Cole Field • Fayetteville, AR	W 14–6	56–11	2–1
May 19	Arkansas	George Cole Field • Fayetteville, AR	L 6–10	56–12	2–2

NCAA tournament: Central Regional

Date	Opponent	Site/stadium	Score	Overall Record	NCAAT Record
May 23	Grambling State	Disch–Falk Field • Austin, TX	W 4–3^{12}	57–12	1–0
May 24	Houston	Disch–Falk Field • Austin, TX	W 9–2	58–12	2–0
May 25	Oklahoma	Disch–Falk Field • Austin, TX	W 9–4	59–12	3–0
May 26	Lamar	Disch–Falk Field • Austin, TX	W 10–2	60–12	4–0

NCAA tournament: College World Series

Date	Opponent	Site/stadium	Score	Overall Record	CWS Record
June 1	Arizona	Johnny Rosenblatt Stadium • Omaha, NE	W 2–1	61–12	1–0
June 5	Miami (FL)	Johnny Rosenblatt Stadium • Omaha, NE	W 8–4	62–12	2–0
June 7	Mississippi State	Johnny Rosenblatt Stadium • Omaha, NE	W 12–7	63–12	3–0
June 8	Arkansas	Johnny Rosenblatt Stadium • Omaha, NE	W 8–7^{10}	64–12	4–0
June 9	Miami (FL)	Johnny Rosenblatt Stadium • Omaha, NE	L 1–2	64–13	4–1
June 11	Miami (FL)	Johnny Rosenblatt Stadium • Omaha, NE	L 6–10	64–14	4–2
