= 1985 Mississippi State Bulldogs baseball team =

American college baseball season

1985 Mississippi State Bulldogs baseball

SEC Tournament champions NCAA South I Regional champions

College World Series, 2–2
- Conference: Southeastern Conference
- CB: No. 4
- Record: 50–15 (16–8 SEC)
- Head coach: Ron Polk (10th season)
- Home stadium: Dudy Noble Field

1985 Southeastern Conference baseball standings
	Conf.				Overall
Team	W		L	PCT	W		L	PCT
Eastern Division
No. 11 Florida ^{x}‍‍‍^{y}	15	–	6	.714	43	–	18	.705
Georgia ‍‍‍	11	–	11	.500	33	–	23	.589
Vanderbilt ‍‍‍	10	–	13	.435	35	–	16	.686
Kentucky ‍‍‍	10	–	13	.435	28	–	24	.538
Tennessee ‍‍‍	10	–	13	.435	26	–	23	.531
Western Division
No. 24 LSU ^{x}‍‍‍^{y}	17	–	7	.708	41	–	18	.695
No. 4 Mississippi State ‍‍‡‍^{y}	16	–	8	.667	50	–	15	.769
Auburn ‍‍‍	11	–	12	.478	30	–	22	.577
Alabama ‍‍‍	10	–	14	.417	30	–	23	.566
Ole Miss ‍‍‍	5	–	18	.217	20	–	28	.417
x – Division champion ‡ – Tournament champion y – Invited to the NCAA tournament As of June 30, 1985; Rankings from Collegiate Baseball

The 1985 Mississippi State Bulldogs baseball team represented Mississippi State University in the 1985 NCAA Division I baseball season. They were led by head coach Ron Polk in his tenth season and played their home games at Dudy Noble Field. The Bulldogs were members of the Southeastern Conference, and finished with a record of 50–15, second place in the SEC West with a record of 16–8.

Mississippi State was invited to the NCAA Tournament, where they won the South I Regional to advance to their third College World Series. The Bulldogs tied for third, recording wins against Oklahoma State and eventual semifinalist Arkansas and losses to eventual champion Miami (FL) and runner-up Texas.

The team featured four future Major League players, with Will Clark and Rafael Palmeiro forming a tandem nicknamed "Thunder and Lightning" while Jeff Brantley and Bobby Thigpen would go on to become notable relief pitchers. All four would become All-Stars.

== Personnel ==
=== Roster ===
1985 Mississippi State Bulldogs roster
Pitchers: 8 - Jeff Brantley - Senior; 18 - Trent Intorcia - Junior; 20 - Ray Mullino - Junior; 31 - Steve King - Junior; 36 - Will McRaney - Junior; 40 - Gene Morgan - Senior; 42 - Dave Wilder - Senior	Catchers: 11 - Randy Abrams - Sophomore; 14 - Roark McDonald - Junior; 34 - Tri Weaver - Junior; Outfielders: 4 - Dan Van Cleve - Senior; 6 - Rafael Palmeiro - Junior; 13 - Bobby Thigpen - Senior; 15 - John Mitchell - Sophomore; 29 - Sammy Duda - Senior; 33 - Mike McCraney - Sophomore	Infielders: 5 - Gator Thiesen - Senior; 7 - John Scott - Junior; 10 - Frank Davis - Senior; 12 - Joel Johnson - Junior; 23 - Will Clark - Junior; 27 - Tommy Butt - Junior

=== Coaching staff ===
1985 Mississippi State Bulldogs coaching staff
- 1 - Ron Polk - Head coach – 10th season
- 2 - Tim Sumner - Assistant coach - 4th season
- 9 - Pat McMahon - Associate head coach - 8th season

== Schedule ==
Legend
	Mississippi State win
	Mississippi State loss
*	Non-Conference game

1985 Mississippi State Bulldogs baseball game log
Regular season

February
Date	Opponent	Site/stadium	Score	Overall record	SEC record
Feb 23	Mississippi College*	Dudy Noble Field • Starkville, MS	W 9–1	1–0	
Feb 24	William Carey*	Dudy Noble Field • Starkville, MS	W 10–0	2–0	
Feb 26	Livingston*	Dudy Noble Field • Starkville, MS	W 26–4	3–0	
Feb 27	at South Alabama*	Eddie Stanky Field • Mobile, AL	W 4–1	4–0	
Feb 28	at South Alabama*	Eddie Stanky Field • Mobile, AL	W 2–1	5–0	

March
Date	Opponent	Site/stadium	Score	Overall record	SEC record
Mar 2	Southeastern Louisiana*	Dudy Noble Field • Starkville, MS	W 3–2 ^{(10)}	6–0	
Mar 3	Southeastern Louisiana*	Dudy Noble Field • Starkville, MS	W 4–2	7–0	
Mar 6	Union (TN)*	Dudy Noble Field • Starkville, MS	W 19–2	8–0	
Mar 9	Auburn	Dudy Noble Field • Starkville, MS	W 4–1 ^{(7)}	9–0	1–0
Mar 9	Auburn	Dudy Noble Field • Starkville, MS	W 3–2 ^{(7)}	10–0	2–0
Mar 10	Auburn	Dudy Noble Field • Starkville, MS	W 14–0	11–0	3–0
Mar 13	at Birmingham–Southern*	Stripling Field • Birmingham, AL	W 10–2	12–0	
Mar 14	at Birmingham–Southern*	Stripling Field • Birmingham, AL	W 18–9	13–0	
Mar 16	at LSU	Alex Box Stadium • Baton Rouge, LA	W 7–0 ^{(7)}	14–0	4–0
Mar 16	at LSU	Alex Box Stadium • Baton Rouge, LA	L 6–9 ^{(7)}	14–1	4–1
Mar 17	at LSU	Alex Box Stadium • Baton Rouge, LA	L 4–7	14–2	4–2
Mar 19	New Orleans*	Dudy Noble Field • Starkville, MS	L 4–10	14–3	
Mar 20	New Orleans*	Dudy Noble Field • Starkville, MS	W 7–6	15–3	
Mar 22	at Livingston*	Livingston, AL	W 5–0	16–3	
Mar 23	Alabama	Dudy Noble Field • Starkville, MS	L 4–7 ^{(7)}	16–4	4–3
Mar 24	Alabama	Dudy Noble Field • Starkville, MS	W 17–10 ^{(7)}	17–4	5–3
Mar 24	Alabama	Dudy Noble Field • Starkville, MS	W 11–5 ^{(7)}	18–4	6–3
Mar 26	at Delta State*	Ferriss Field • Cleveland, MS	W 6–4	19–4	
Mar 28	at Delta State*	Ferriss Field • Cleveland, MS	W 14–8 ^{(7)}	20–4	
Mar 30	at Ole Miss	Swayze Field • Oxford, MS	W 4–0	21–4	7–3
Mar 30	at Ole Miss	Swayze Field • Oxford, MS	W 10–2	22–4	8–3
Mar 31	at Ole Miss	Swayze Field • Oxford, MS	L 7–12	22–5	8–4

April
Date	Opponent	Site/stadium	Score	Overall record	SEC record
Apr 2	Arkansas State*	Dudy Noble Field • Starkville, MS	W 13–4	23–5	
Apr 2	Arkansas State*	Dudy Noble Field • Starkville, MS	W 12–5	24–5	
Apr 5	at Hawaii–Hilo*	Francis Wong Stadium • Hilo, HI	W 7–2	25–5	
Apr 6	at Hawaii–Hilo*	Francis Wong Stadium • Hilo, HI	W 2–0	26–5	
Apr 6	at Hawaii–Hilo*	Francis Wong Stadium • Hilo, HI	W 7–1 ^{(7)}	27–5	
Apr 9	at Hawaii*	Les Murakami Stadium • Honolulu, HI	W 8–1	28–5	
Apr 10	at Hawaii*	Les Murakami Stadium • Honolulu, HI	L 3–4	28–6	
Apr 13	at Auburn	Plainsman Park • Auburn, AL	L 2–3 ^{(7)}	28–7	8–5
Apr 13	at Auburn	Plainsman Park • Auburn, AL	L 1–3 ^{(8)}	28–8	8–6
Apr 14	at Auburn	Plainsman Park • Auburn, AL	L 1–8	28–9	8–7
Apr 16	vs Mississippi College*	Smith–Wills Stadium • Jackson, MS	L 5–7	28–10	
Apr 17	Jackson State*	Dudy Noble Field • Starkville, MS	W 9–3	29–10	
Apr 18	Jackson State*	Dudy Noble Field • Starkville, MS	W 18–7	30–10	
Apr 20	LSU	Dudy Noble Field • Starkville, MS	W 6–1 ^{(7)}	31–10	9–7
Apr 20	LSU	Dudy Noble Field • Starkville, MS	W 6–5 ^{(7)}	32–10	10–7
Apr 21	LSU	Dudy Noble Field • Starkville, MS	W 7–4	33–10	11–7
Apr 23	vs Ole Miss*	Smith–Wills Stadium • Jackson, MS (Mayor's Trophy)	W 5–2	34–10	
Apr 25	at Southern Miss*	Pete Taylor Park • Hattiesburg, MS	W 11–4 ^{(7)}	35–10	
Apr 25	at Southern Miss*	Pete Taylor Park • Hattiesburg, MS	W 3–0 ^{(7)}	36–10	
Apr 27	at Alabama	Sewell–Thomas Stadium • Tuscaloosa, AL	L 5–6 ^{(10)}	36–11	11–8
Apr 27	at Alabama	Sewell–Thomas Stadium • Tuscaloosa, AL	W 14–4 ^{(7)}	37–11	12–8
Apr 28	at Alabama	Sewell–Thomas Stadium • Tuscaloosa, AL	W 6–4	38–11	13–8
Apr 30	vs Arkansas*	Legion Field • Greenville, MS	W 16–2 ^{(5)}	39–11	

May
Date	Opponent	Site/stadium	Score	Overall record	SEC record
May 1	vs Arkansas*	Ray Winder Field • Little Rock, AR	L 1–13	39–12	
May 4	Ole Miss	Dudy Noble Field • Starkville, MS	W 6–5 ^{(7)}	40–12	14–8
May 4	Ole Miss	Dudy Noble Field • Starkville, MS	W 4–1 ^{(7)}	41–12	15–8
May 5	Ole Miss	Dudy Noble Field • Starkville, MS	W 4–3	42–12	16–8

Postseason

SEC Tournament
Date	Opponent	Site/stadium	Score	Overall record	SECT record
May 10	Florida	Alex Box Stadium • Baton Rouge, LA	W 8–3	43–12	1–0
May 11	Georgia	Alex Box Stadium • Baton Rouge, LA	W 2–0	44–12	2–0
May 12	Georgia	Alex Box Stadium • Baton Rouge, LA	W 8–3	45–12	3–0

NCAA South I Regional
Date	Opponent	Site/stadium	Score	Overall record	Regional record
May 24	West Virginia	Dudy Noble Field • Starkville, MS	W 10–1	46–12	1–0
May 25	New Orleans	Dudy Noble Field • Starkville, MS	W 8–4	47–12	2–0
May 26	Michigan	Dudy Noble Field • Starkville, MS	L 6–14	47–13	2–1
May 27	Michigan	Dudy Noble Field • Starkville, MS	W 19–8	48–13	3–1

College World Series
Date	Opponent	Site/stadium	Score	Overall record	CWS record
May 31	Oklahoma State	Johnny Rosenblatt Stadium • Omaha, NE	W 12–3	49–13	1–0
June 3	Arkansas	Johnny Rosenblatt Stadium • Omaha, NE	W 5–4	50–13	2–0
June 7	Texas	Johnny Rosenblatt Stadium • Omaha, NE	L 7–12	50–14	2–1
June 8	Miami (FL)	Johnny Rosenblatt Stadium • Omaha, NE	L 5–6	50–15	2–2
