= 1985 Miami Hurricanes baseball team =

American college baseball season

1985 Miami Hurricanes baseball

National champions
- Conference: Independent
- CB: No. 1
- Record: 64–16
- Head coach: Ron Fraser (23rd year)
- Home stadium: Mark Light Field

1985 NCAA Division I baseball independents standings
	Conf.				Overall
Team	W		L	PCT	W		L	PCT
No. 1 Miami (FL) ‍‍‍^{y}		–		–	64	–	16	.800
Campbell ‍‍‍		–		–	32	–	17	.653
Stetson ‍‍‍		–		–	38	–	23	.623
No. 21 New Orleans ‍‍‍^{y}		–		–	43	–	28	.606
UCF ‍‍‍		–		–	52	–	34	.605
Hofstra ‍‍‍		–		–	13	–	16	.448
Lafayette ‍‍‍		–		–	17	–	23	.425
Richmond ‍‍‍		–		–	20	–	29	.408
y – Invited to the NCAA tournament As of June 30, 1985; Rankings from Collegiate Baseball

The 1985 Miami Hurricanes baseball team represented the University of Miami in the 1985 NCAA Division I baseball season. The team was coached by Ron Fraser in his 23rd season.

The Hurricanes won the College World Series, defeating the Texas Longhorns in the championship game.

== Roster ==
1985 Miami Hurricanes roster
Pitchers: Lozaro Collazo; Dan Davies; Rick Kosek; Steffen Majer; Gus Meizoso; Bob O'Brien; Alain Patenaude; Bill Phillips; Rick Raether; Kevin Ryan; Chris Sarmiento; 22 Kevin Sheary	Infielders: Rusty DeBold; Steve Fauci; Chris Hart; Bruce Roberts; Jon Leake; Joe Nelson; John Noce; Donald Rowland	Outfielders: Frank Dominguez; 12 Mike Fiore; Calvin James; Mark Malizia; Willie Martinez; Rick Richardi; 24 Greg Vaughn; Catchers: 39 Greg Ellena; 10 Chris Magno; Joe Raedle; Julio Solis

== Schedule ==
1985 Miami Hurricanes baseball game log
Regular season
February

Date	Opponent	Site/stadium	Score	Overall record
February 1	South Alabama	Mark Light Field	14–5	1–0
February 2	South Alabama	Mark Light Field	12–9	2–0
February 3	South Alabama	Mark Light Field	5–7	2–1
February 5	at South Florida	Red McEwen Field	3–4	2–2
February 9	Arkansas	Mark Light Field	5–2	3–2
February 9	Arkansas	Mark Light Field	2–1	4–2
February 10	Arkansas	Mark Light Field	4–0	5–2
February 12	Armstrong State	Mark Light Field	14–7	6–2
February 13	Armstrong State	Mark Light Field	15–3	7–2
February 15	Florida	Mark Light Field	5–2	8–2
February 16	Florida	Mark Light Field	2–4	8–3
February 17	Florida	Mark Light Field	5–2	9–3
February 18	Seton Hall	Mark Light Field	9–4	10–3
February 20	St. Thomas	Mark Light Field	1–4	10–4
February 22	Florida State	Mark Light Field	2–5	10–5
February 23	Florida State	Mark Light Field	15–4	11–5
February 24	Florida State	Mark Light Field	6–5	12–5
February 27	Tampa	Mark Light Field	17–4	13–5
February 28	New Orleans	Mark Light Field	8–6	14–5

March

Date	Opponent	Site/stadium	Score	Overall record
March 1	New Orleans	Mark Light Field	10–0	15–5
March 2	New Orleans	Mark Light Field	8–3	16–5
March 3	New Orleans	Mark Light Field	5–3	17–5
March 5	Rice	Mark Light Field	7–3	18–5
March 5	Rice	Mark Light Field	11–3	19–5
March 8	Maine	Mark Light Field	10–1	20–5
March 9	Maine	Mark Light Field	9–3	21–5
March 10	James Madison	Mark Light Field	3–2	22–5
March 12	Creighton	Mark Light Field	6–5	23–5
March 13	Creighton	Mark Light Field	14–7	24–5
March 14	Southern Illinois	Mark Light Field	12–4	25–5
March 15	Southern Illinois	Mark Light Field	2–0	26–5
March 16	Southern Illinois	Mark Light Field	7–6	27–5
March 17	Rutgers	Mark Light Field	9–3	28–5
March 18	Mercer	Mark Light Field	14–2	29–5
March 19	Michigan State	Mark Light Field	11–3	30–5
March 20	Maine	Mark Light Field	5–3	31–5
March 22	Michigan State	Mark Light Field	18–5	32–5
March 23	Mercer	Mark Light Field	5–1	33–5
March 23	Maine	Mark Light Field	9–4	34–5
March 24	Maine	Mark Light Field	2–3	34–6
March 27	Michigan State	Mark Light Field	6–3	35–6
March 29	Michigan State	Mark Light Field	5–1	36–6
March 30	Michigan State	Mark Light Field	6–7	36–7

April

Date	Opponent	Site/stadium	Score	Overall record
April 3	Florida Atlantic	Mark Light Field	6–2	37–7
April 5	vs. Southern California	All Sports Stadium	11–1	38–7
April 6	vs. Oklahoma	All Sports Stadium	1–7	38–8
April 6	vs. Cal State Fullerton	All Sports Stadium	6–3	39–8
April 7	vs. Southern California	All Sports Stadium	8–6	40–8
April 9	Barry	Mark Light Field	12–1	41–8
April 10	Florida International	Mark Light Field	6–3	42–8
April 12	at Florida State	Seminole Stadium	3–2	43–8
April 13	at Florida State	Seminole Stadium	5–13	43–9
April 14	at Florida State	Seminole Stadium	8–5	44–9
April 16	Barry	Mark Light Field	5–0	45–9
April 17	at Florida International		4–3	46–9
April 19	at Florida	Perry Field	11–0	47–9
April 20	at Florida	Perry Field	6–4	48–9
April 24	Florida Atlantic	Mark Light Stadium	11–3	49–9
April 29	at Stetson	Conrad Park	12–10	50–9
April 30	at Stetson	Conrad Park	2–13	50–10
April 30	at Stetson	Conrad Park	4–3	51–10

May

Date	Opponent	Site/stadium	Score	Overall record
May 3	at Alabama	Sewell–Thomas Stadium	14–10	52–10
May 4	at Alabama	Sewell–Thomas Stadium	6–12	52–11
May 5	at Alabama	Sewell–Thomas Stadium	7–11	52–12
May 11	Central Florida	Mark Light Field	6–7	52–13
May 12	Central Florida	Mark Light Field	18–5	53–13
May 12	Central Florida	Mark Light Field	28–5	54–13
May 17	South Florida	Mark Light Field	9–0	55–13
May 18	South Florida	Mark Light Field	1–2	55–14
May 19	South Florida	Mark Light Field	8–3	56–14

Postseason
NCAA tournament: Atlantic Regional

Date	Opponent	Site/stadium	Score	Overall record
May 24	vs. Princeton	Mark Light Field	22–6	57–14
May 26	vs. Virginia	Mark Light Field	11–6	58–14
May 27	vs. Florida	Mark Light Field	1–8	58–15
May 28	vs. Florida	Mark Light Field	12–9	59–15

NCAA tournament: College World Series

Date	Opponent	Site/stadium	Score	Overall record
June 1	vs. Stanford	Rosenblatt Stadium	17–3	60–15
June 5	vs. Texas	Rosenblatt Stadium	4–8	61–16
June 6	vs. Oklahoma State	Rosenblatt Stadium	2–1	61–16
June 8	vs. Mississippi State	Rosenblatt Stadium	6–5	62–16
June 9	vs. Texas	Rosenblatt Stadium	2–1	63–16
June 11	vs. Texas	Rosenblatt Stadium	10–6	64–16

== Awards and honors ==
Greg Ellena

- College World Series Most Outstanding Player

Mike Fiore

- Freshman All-America

Chris Magno

- College World Series All-Tournament Team

Rick Raether

- All-America First Team

Kevin Sheary

- College World Series All-Tournament Team

== Hurricanes in the 1985 MLB draft ==
The following members of the Miami baseball program were drafted in the 1985 Major League Baseball draft.

Player	Position	Round	Overall	MLB Team
Donald Rowland	2B	8th	210th	Detroit Tigers
Calvin James	OF	13th	326th	Houston Astros
Alan Patenaude	RHP	13th	340th	Detroit Tigers
Rick Raether	RHP	18th	459th	California Angels
Kevin Sheary	RHP	30th	760th	St. Louis Cardinals
