= 1985 Oklahoma State Cowboys baseball team =

American college baseball season

1985 Oklahoma State Cowboys baseball

Big Eight champions Midwest Regional champions

College World Series, T-5th
- Conference: Big Eight Conference
- CB: No. 5
- Record: 58–16–1 (19–4 Big 8)
- Head coach: Gary Ward (8th season)
- Pitching coach: Tom Holliday (8th season)
- Home stadium: Allie P. Reynolds Stadium

1985 Big Eight Conference baseball standings
	Conf.				Overall
Team	W		L	PCT	W		L	PCT
No. 5 Oklahoma State ‍†‍‡‍^{y}	19	–	4	.826	58	–	16	.784
No. 15 Oklahoma ‍‍‍^{y}	18	–	6	.750	55	–	14	.797
Nebraska ‍‍‍	16	–	6	.727	45	–	24	.652
Kansas State ‍‍‍	8	–	14	.364	29	–	33	.468
Missouri ‍‍‍	7	–	17	.292	36	–	27	.571
Iowa State ‍‍‍	6	–	15	.286	22	–	38	.367
Kansas ‍‍‍	5	–	17	.227	19	–	30	.388
† – Conference champion ‡ – Tournament champion y – Invited to the NCAA tournament As of June 30, 1985; Rankings from Collegiate Baseball

The 1985 Oklahoma State Cowboys baseball team represented the Oklahoma State University in the 1985 NCAA Division I baseball season. The Cowboys played their home games at Allie P. Reynolds Stadium. The team was coached by Gary Ward in his 8th year at Oklahoma State.

The Cowboys won the Midwest Regional to advance to the College World Series, where they were defeated by the Miami Hurricanes.

== Roster ==
1985 Oklahoma State Cowboys baseball team
Players
Coaches

#	Pos.	Name	B/T	Height	Weight	Year	Home town
	INF	Jimmy Barragan	/	—	—	Fr
	P	Tony Bartolomucci	/	—	—	Sr
	RHP	Chris Bayley	/R	—	—
	RHP	Jeff Bronkey	R/R	6 ft 3 in (1.91 m)	215 lb (98 kg)		Klamath Falls, Oregon
	OF	Doug Dascenzo	S/R	5 ft 7 in (1.7 m)	150 lb (68 kg)		Brownsville, Pennsylvania
		Alton Davis	/	—	—
	C	Mike Day	L/R	5 ft 11 in (1.8 m)	200 lb (91 kg)
		Chris Deaton	/	—	—
	C	Carlos Diaz	R/R	6 ft 3 in (1.91 m)	190 lb (86 kg)		Elizabeth, New Jersey
	P	Gordie Dillard	/	—	—
	INF	Sergio Espinal	R/R	6 ft 0 in (1.83 m)	175 lb (79 kg)	Jr
		Kevin Fowler	/	—	—		Stillwater, Oklahoma
		Joe Giordanella	/	—	—
	OF	Pete Incaviglia	R/R	6 ft 1 in (1.85 m)	225 lb (102 kg)	Jr	Pebble Beach, California
		Ron Johnson	/	—	—
	OF	Bryan Kostishion	/	—	—
	LHP	Reese Lambert	L/L	6 ft 4 in (1.93 m)	195 lb (88 kg)
	P	Steve Lienhard	/	—	—
		James Long	/	—	—	Fr
		Bob McKercher	/	—	—
	RHP	Marv Rockman	/R	6 ft 0 in (1.83 m)	180 lb (82 kg)
	P	Durrell Schoenly	/	—	—
	OF	Billy Smith	R/R	6 ft 0 in (1.83 m)	185 lb (84 kg)
		Chuck Tate	/	—	—
	LHP	Mike Trapasso	L/L	6 ft 1 in (1.85 m)	185 lb (84 kg)	Sr	St. Louis, Missouri
		Ed Veres	/	—	—
	RHP	Rob Walton	/R	5 ft 10 in (1.78 m)	165 lb (75 kg)		Rutherford, New Jersey
	INF	Randy Whisler	R/R	5 ft 9 in (1.75 m)	170 lb (77 kg)		Klamath Falls, Oregon

Head coach

20 Gary Ward

Assistant coach(es)

Wade Robertson

Pitching coach(es)

Tom Holliday

Legend

- (C) Team captain
- (S) Suspended
- (I) Ineligible
- Injured
- Current redshirt

Roster
Last update: March 13, 2021

== Schedule ==
1985 Oklahoma State Cowboys baseball game log
Regular season
March (21–7–1)

#	Date	Opponent	Site/stadium	Score	Overall record	Big 8 record
1	March 1	at South Florida	Red McEwen Field • Tampa, Florida	11–12	0–1	–
2	March 2	at South Florida	Red McEwen Field • Tampa, Florida	11–8	1–1	–
3	March 2	vs South Florida	Red McEwen Field • Tampa, Florida	8–9	1–2	–
4	March 3	vs Eastern Michigan	Joker Marchant Stadium • Lakeland, Florida	7–6	2–2	–
5	March 4	vs Western Michigan	Joker Marchant Stadium • Lakeland, Florida	4–5	2–3	–
6	March 4	vs Western Michigan	Joker Marchant Stadium • Lakeland, Florida	2–2	2–3–1	–
7	March 5	vs Florida Southern	Joker Marchant Stadium • Lakeland, Florida	6–9	2–4–1	–
8	March 6	at Florida	Perry Field • Gainesville, Florida	12–8	3–4–1	–
9	March 7	vs Eastern Michigan	Joker Marchant Stadium • Lakeland, Florida	7–6	4–4–1	–
10	March 8	vs Stetson	Perry Field • Gainesville, Florida	6–11	4–5–1	–
11	March 9	vs Stetson	Perry Field • Gainesville, Florida	15–3	5–5–1	–
12	March 10	vs Maine	Unknown • Miami, Florida	13–11	6–5–1	–
13	March 11	vs St. Thomas University	Unknown • Miami, Florida	22–9	7–5–1	–
14	March 11	vs Florida Atlantic	Unknown • Miami, Florida	13–1	8–5–1	–
15	March 12	vs Maine	Unknown • Miami, Florida	7–2	9–5–1	–
16	March 12	vs Bowling Green	Unknown • Miami, Florida	11–2	10–5–1	–
17	March 13	vs Maine	Unknown • Miami, Florida	7–2	11–5–1	–
18	March 15	vs St. Francis	Maestri Field at Privateer Park • New Orleans, Louisiana	11–8	12–5–1	–
19	March 15	vs St. Francis	Maestri Field at Privateer Park • New Orleans, Louisiana	6–1	13–5–1	–
20	March 16	at New Orleans	Maestri Field at Privateer Park • New Orleans, Louisiana	0–7	13–6–1	–
21	March 23	South Dakota State	Allie P. Reynolds Stadium • Stillwater, Oklahoma	19–2	14–6–1	4–0
22	March 23	South Dakota State	Allie P. Reynolds Stadium • Stillwater, Oklahoma	5–2	15–6–1	–
23	March 24	South Dakota State	Allie P. Reynolds Stadium • Stillwater, Oklahoma	6–2	16–6–1	–
24	March 24	South Dakota State	Allie P. Reynolds Stadium • Stillwater, Oklahoma	7–0	17–6–1	–
25	March 26	Arkansas	Allie P. Reynolds Stadium • Stillwater, Oklahoma	3–1	18–6–1	–
26	March 28	Fort Hayes State	Allie P. Reynolds Stadium • Stillwater, Oklahoma	11–1	19–6–1	–
27	March 28	Fort Hayes State	Allie P. Reynolds Stadium • Stillwater, Oklahoma	21–1	20–6–1	–
28	March 31	Oklahoma	Allie P. Reynolds Stadium • Stillwater, Oklahoma	8–21	20–7–1	0–1
29	March 31	Oklahoma	Allie P. Reynolds Stadium • Stillwater, Oklahoma	11–1	21–7–1	1–1

April (24–3)

#	Date	Opponent	Site/stadium	Score	Overall record	Big 8 record
30	April 1	Oklahoma	Allie P. Reynolds Stadium • Stillwater, Oklahoma	11–6	22–7–1	2–1
31	April 1	Oklahoma	Allie P. Reynolds Stadium • Stillwater, Oklahoma	8–0	23–7–1	3–1
32	April 2	at Arkansas	George Cole Field • Fayetteville, Arkansas	14–6	24–7–1	3–1
33	April 3	Missouri Southern	Allie P. Reynolds Stadium • Stillwater, Oklahoma	13–11	25–7–1	3–1
34	April 3	Missouri Southern	Allie P. Reynolds Stadium • Stillwater, Oklahoma	9–4	26–7–1	3–1
35	April 6	at Kansas State	KSU Baseball Stadium • Manhattan, Kansas	2–4	26–8–1	3–2
36	April 6	at Kansas State	KSU Baseball Stadium • Manhattan, Kansas	6–1	27–8–1	4–2
37	April 7	at Kansas State	KSU Baseball Stadium • Manhattan, Kansas	18–2	28–8–1	5–2
38	April 7	at Kansas State	KSU Baseball Stadium • Manhattan, Kansas	6–4	29–8–1	6–2
39	April 9	at North Texas State	Mack Park • Denton, Texas	23–10	30–8–1	6–2
40	April 9	at North Texas State	Mack Park • Denton, Texas	6–5	31–8–1	6–2
41	April 10	Wichita State	Allie P. Reynolds Stadium • Stillwater, Oklahoma	9–11	31–9–1	6–2
42	April 12	Saint Louis	Allie P. Reynolds Stadium • Stillwater, Oklahoma	21–1	32–9–1	6–2
43	April 12	Saint Louis	Allie P. Reynolds Stadium • Stillwater, Oklahoma	15–5	33–9–1	6–2
44	April 13	Saint Louis	Allie P. Reynolds Stadium • Stillwater, Oklahoma	14–1	34–9–1	6–2
45	April 14	at Texas	Disch–Falk Field • Austin, Texas	4–9	35–9–1	6–2
46	April 15	at Texas	Disch–Falk Field • Austin, Texas	12–13	35–10–1	6–2
47	April 19	at Missouri	Simmons Field • Columbia, Missouri	10–8	36–10–1	7–2
48	April 20	at Missouri	Simmons Field • Columbia, Missouri	17–16	37–10–1	8–2
49	April 20	at Missouri	Simmons Field • Columbia, Missouri	6–4	38–10–1	9–2
50	April 21	at Missouri	Simmons Field • Columbia, Missouri	20–4	39–10–1	10–2
51	April 24	at Wichita State	Eck Stadium • Wichita, Kansas	8–4	40–10–1	10–2
52	April 27	at Kansas	Unknown • Lawrence, Kansas	25–19	41–10–1	11–2
53	April 27	at Kansas	Unknown • Lawrence, Kansas	22–1	42–10–1	12–2
54	April 28	at Kansas	Unknown • Lawrence, Kansas	8–4	43–10–1	13–2
55	April 28	at Kansas	Unknown • Lawrence, Kansas	13–3	44–10–1	14–2
56	April 30	Kansas State	Allie P. Reynolds Stadium • Stillwater, Oklahoma	12–1	45–10–1	14–2

May (6–3)

#	Date	Opponent	Site/stadium	Score	Overall record	Big 8 record
57	May 2	North Texas State	Allie P. Reynolds Stadium • Stillwater, Oklahoma	5–4	46–10–1	14–2
58	May 2	North Texas State	Allie P. Reynolds Stadium • Stillwater, Oklahoma	6–5	47–10–1	14–2
59	May 4	Nebraska	Allie P. Reynolds Stadium • Stillwater, Oklahoma	8–21	47–11–1	14–3
60	May 4	Nebraska	Allie P. Reynolds Stadium • Stillwater, Oklahoma	5–11	47–12–1	14–4
61	May 5	Nebraska	Allie P. Reynolds Stadium • Stillwater, Oklahoma	24–9	48–12–1	15–4
62	May 5	Nebraska	Allie P. Reynolds Stadium • Stillwater, Oklahoma	16–9	49–12–1	16–4
63	May 11	at Iowa State	Cap Timm Field • Ames, Iowa	7–9	49–13–1	16–5
64	May 11	at Iowa State	Cap Timm Field • Ames, Iowa	14–2	50–13–1	17–5
65	May 12	at Iowa State	Cap Timm Field • Ames, Iowa	18–7	51–13–1	18–5

Postseason
Big Eight Conference Tournament (3–0)

#	Date	Opponent	Site/stadium	Score	Overall record	Big 8 record
66	May 15	vs Kansas State	Unknown • Oklahoma City, Oklahoma	10–4	52–13–1	18–5
67	May 16	vs Oklahoma	Unknown • Oklahoma City, Oklahoma	11–5	53–13–1	18–5
68	May 16	vs Oklahoma	Unknown • Oklahoma City, Oklahoma	19–4	54–13–1	18–5

NCAA Midwest Regional (3–1)

#	Date	Opponent	Site/stadium	Score	Overall record	Big 8 record
69	May 24	Minnesota	Allie P. Reynolds Stadium • Stillwater, Oklahoma	8–3	55–13–1	18–5
70	May 25	Wichita State	Allie P. Reynolds Stadium • Stillwater, Oklahoma	15–8	56–13–1	18–5
71	May 26	Wichita State	Allie P. Reynolds Stadium • Stillwater, Oklahoma	2–7	56–14–1	18–5
72	May 27	Wichita State	Allie P. Reynolds Stadium • Stillwater, Oklahoma	10–6	57–14–1	18–5

College World Series (1–2)

#	Date	Opponent	Site/stadium	Score	Overall record	Big 8 record
73	May 31	vs Mississippi State	Johnny Rosenblatt Stadium • Omaha, Nebraska	3–12	57–15–1	18–5
74	June 2	vs South Carolina	Johnny Rosenblatt Stadium • Omaha, Nebraska	16–11	58–15–1	18–5
75	June 6	vs Miami (FL)	Johnny Rosenblatt Stadium • Omaha, Nebraska	1–2	58–16–1	18–5

== Awards and honors ==
Jeff Bronkey

- College World Series All-Tournament Team

Doug Dascenzo

- All-Big Eight Conference
- Big Eight Conference All-Tournament Team

Mike Day

- Big Eight Conference All-Tournament Team

Sergio Espinal

- Big Eight Conference All-Tournament Team

Pete Incaviglia

- All-Big Eight Conference
- Big Eight Conference All-Tournament Team
- First Team All-American Baseball America
- First Team All-American American Baseball Coaches Association

Kevin Fowler

- All-Big Eight Conference

Randy Whisler

- College World Series All-Tournament Team
