= Coaches Stadium at Monier Field =

Baseball venue in Charleston, Illinois, US

- Interactive map of Coaches Stadium at Monier Field
- Former names: Monier Field (1982–2002)
- Location: Campus of Eastern Illinois University, Charleston, Illinois, United States
- Coordinates: 39.478579°N 88.180794°W
- Owner: Eastern Illinois University
- Operator: Eastern Illinois University
- Capacity: 500
- Surface: Natural grass
- Scoreboard: Electronic
- Field size: 340 feet (Left field); 360 feet (LCF); 380 feet (Center field); 360 feet (RCF); 340 feet (Right field)

Construction
- Opened: 1982
- Renovated: 2002

Tenant
- Eastern Illinois Panthers baseball (OVC) (1982–present)

Coaches Stadium at Monier Field is a baseball venue in Charleston, Illinois, United States. It is home to the Eastern Illinois Panthers baseball team of the NCAA Division I Ohio Valley Conference. It has a capacity of 500 spectators. Eastern Illinois' baseball program has used the field since its 1982 move to Division I. Originally known simply as Monier Field, the facility was renamed after 2002 renovations, which added chairback seating, a press box, a sprinkler system, brick dugouts, and concessions. Fourteen red brick pillars, one for each of Eastern Illinois' 14 baseball coaches, surround the stadium.

== See also ==
- List of NCAA Division I baseball venues
