= Mark Davis (outfielder) =

American baseball player (born 1964)

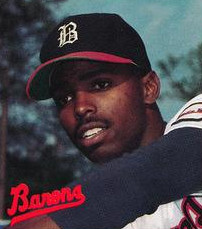
- Davis in 1988
- Outfielder
- Born: November 25, 1964 (age 61); San Diego, California, U.S.
- Batted: Right Threw: Right

MLB debut
- July 2, 1991, for the California Angels

Last MLB appearance
- July 5, 1991, for the California Angels

MLB statistics
- Hits: 0
- At bats: 2
- Appearances: 3
- Stats at Baseball Reference

Teams
- California Angels (1991)

Mark Anthony Davis (born November 25, 1964) is an American former professional baseball player who played one season for the California Angels of Major League Baseball.
