= Greg Ellena =

American baseball player

Greg Ellena is an American baseball player who won the 1985 College World Series Most Outstanding Player award while a junior at University of Miami. He is one of four players from University of Miami to win that award. The others are Dan Smith, Pat Burrell and Charlton Jimerson. His position was a designated hitter.

He never played professionally.

Ellena graduated with a degree in electrical engineering. He worked for Florida Power and Light and Dominion Power.
