= George Cole Field =

Ballpark in Fayetteville, Arkansas

- Interactive map of George Cole Field
- Full name: George Cole Field
- Location: Fayetteville, Arkansas
- Coordinates: 36°3′53″N 94°10′46″W
- Capacity: 3,000
- Surface: Grass
- Field size: 330 LF; 395 CF; 320 RF

Construction
- Opened: 1975

Tenants
- Arkansas Razorbacks baseball(Southwest Conference) (1975-1990) (Southeastern Conference) (1991-1995)

George Cole Field was a ballpark located in Fayetteville, Arkansas, United States, and served as the home of the Arkansas Razorbacks baseball program for two decades until Baum Stadium opened in 1996. The ballpark is named after former Razorbacks baseball player, George Cole.
