= Pete Beiden Field at Bob Bennett Stadium =

Baseball stadium on CSU Fresno campus

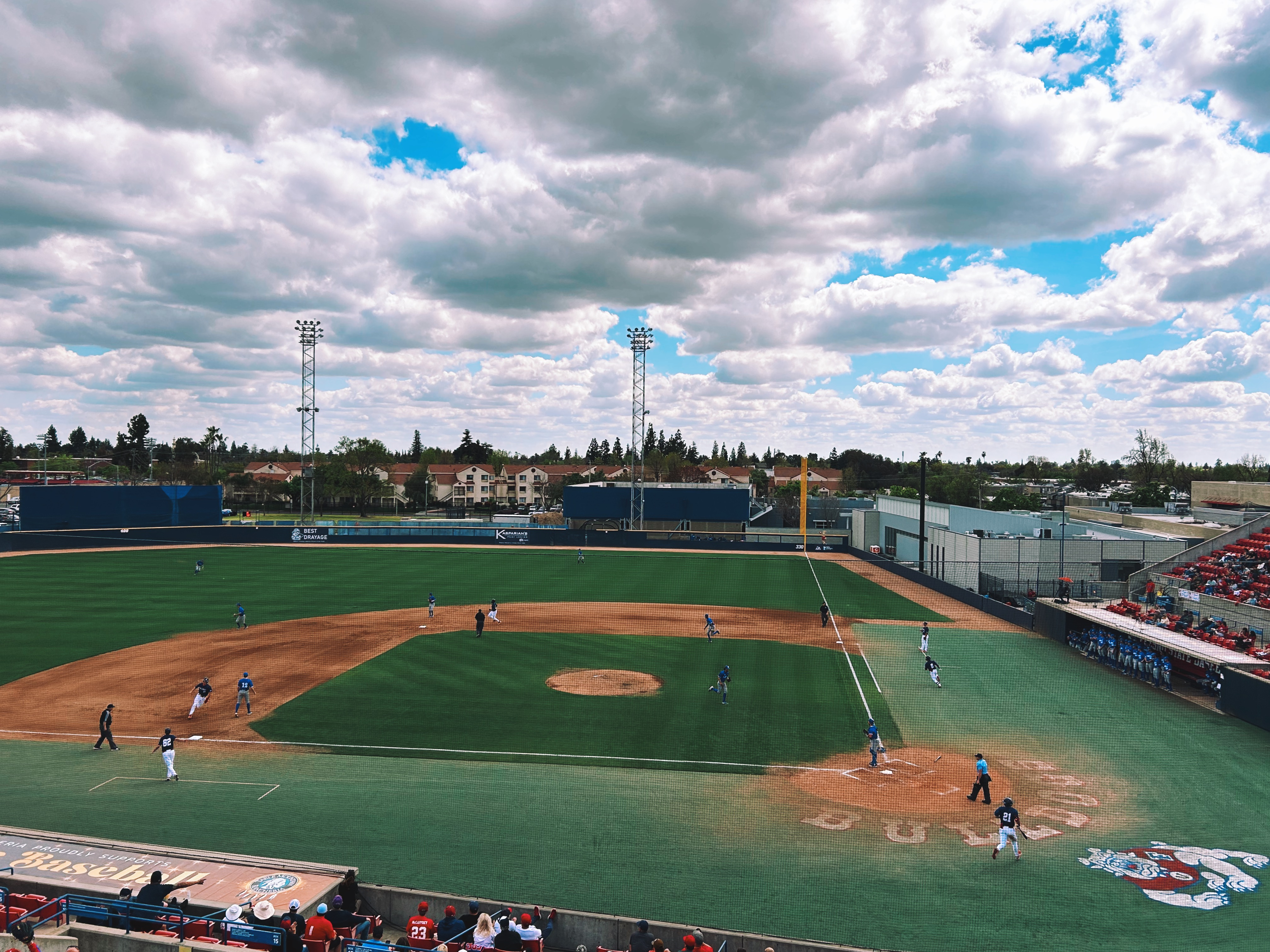
- Interactive map of Pete Beiden Field at Bob Bennett Stadium
- Full name: Pete Beiden Field at Bob Bennett Stadium
- Former names: Varsity Park (1966–1972), Pete Beiden Field
- Location: N Cedar Avenue and Bulldog Lane, Fresno, California, US
- Coordinates: 36.813477°N 119.755699°W
- Owner: Fresno State University
- Operator: Fresno State University
- Capacity: 3,575
- Surface: Natural grass
- Scoreboard: Electronic
- Record attendance: 5,673
- Field size: 330 ft. (LF), 370 ft. (LCF), 400 ft. (CF), 370 ft. (RCF), 330 ft. (RF)

Construction
- Built: 1966
- Renovated: 1969, 1983, 1996, 1998, 1999, 2004, 2010

Tenants
- Fresno State Bulldogs baseball (MWC) (1966–present); Fresno Grizzlies (PCL) (1998–2001)

Pete Beiden Field at Bob Bennett Stadium, formerly Varsity Park, is a baseball stadium on the campus of the California State University, Fresno in Fresno, California, United States. It was built in 1966. The field is the home of the Fresno State Bulldogs baseball team and named after former Fresno State baseball coach Pete Beiden. The park was redesigned in 1983 and now holds 3,575 people. Prior to the 2002 opening of Grizzlies Stadium, the park also was the home of the Fresno Grizzlies minor league baseball team.

== History ==
Originally known as Varsity Park, the field was dedicated in 1972 to Pete Beiden, Fresno State baseball coach from 1948 to 1969. Beiden, who led the program to 600 wins in his 21 seasons, was inducted in 1972 into the College Baseball Coaches Association Hall of Fame.

Stadium lighting was installed in 1969 and updated in 1996. In 1983, the venue underwent a $2.2 million redesign. In 1998, a new scoreboard, PA system, and bleacher sections along both foul lines were added. In 1999, the natural grass infield was renovated. In 2004, the left field bleacher section (added in 1998) was removed to allow for indoor batting cages and a clubhouse to be built. Following the 2010 season, further renovations added a turf "halo" surrounding the infield and a new sound system.

As of the end of the 2009 season, Fresno State has a 1,023–439–1 (.699) all-time record at Beiden Field.

Fresno State hosted the 2013 Mountain West Conference baseball tournament at the stadium from May 22 through 26, at the conclusion of their first season in the Mountain West Conference.

== Features ==
On the field itself, the facility features bullpens, 200,000 ft^{2} (19,000 m^{2}) of grass surface, cinder-clay mix infield dirt, and a rock dirt warning track. In 2000, the American Baseball Coaches Association/Turface Field Maintenance Award was given to the field's groundskeepers. On the center field wall, the numbers of two Fresno State coaches (#2 for Pete Beiden and #26 for Bob Bennett) are displayed. In addition, a seven-foot statue of Beiden stands outside the stadium. The field's stadium lighting includes eight towers with a total of 98 bulbs.

Around the playing field, the facility includes a clubhouse, offices, batting cages, restrooms, concessions stands, and a press box suitable for 40 media members.

== Attendance ==
Out of the venue's capacity of 5,757 spectators, 3,575 seats are chairback. The main, concrete seating structure lies behind home plate, while additional bleacher seating lies down the right field foul line. The section behind home plate features four lower rows of box seats and 16 upper rows of more chairback seating. The two sections are separated by a cross aisle.

In 1988 and 1989, the program led Division I college baseball in single-game attendance. In 2013, the Bulldogs ranked 45th among Division I baseball programs in attendance, averaging 1,432 per home game.

=== Top 10 single games ===
The following is a list of the top 10 single-game attendance figures at Beiden Field.

Rank	Attendance	Opponent	Year
1	5,673	USC	1988
2	5,455	USC	1988
2	5,455	BYU	1988
4	5,422	Michigan	1989
5	5,406	Notre Dame	1989
6	5,355	Minnesota	1988
7	5,223	Stanford	1991
8	5,220	Cal State Fullerton	1995
9	5,113	Stanford	1998
10	5,021	Stanford	1988

== See also ==
- List of NCAA Division I baseball venues
