= 1985 NCAA Division I baseball rankings =

1985 NCAA Division I baseball season

Tournament

College World Series
- Champions: Miami (FL)
- Runners-up: Texas
- MOP: Greg Ellena (Miami (FL))

Seasons
- ← 1984 1986 →

The following polls make up the 1985 NCAA Division I baseball rankings. Baseball America began publishing its poll of the top 20 teams in college baseball in 1981. Beginning with the 1985 season, it expanded to the top 25. Collegiate Baseball Newspaper published its first human poll of the top 20 teams in college baseball in 1957, and expanded to rank the top 30 teams in 1961.

== Baseball America ==
Currently, only the final poll from the 1985 season is available.

Rank	Team
1	Miami (FL)
2	Texas
3	Mississippi State
4	Arkansas
5	Stanford
6	Oklahoma State
7	Oklahoma
8	Pepperdine
9	Michigan
10	Wichita State
11	Arizona
12	Florida State
13	South Carolina
14	Oral Roberts
15	Florida
16	Fresno State
17	Old Dominion
18	California
19	Nebraska
20	LSU
21	Baylor
22	Houston
23	New Mexico
24	Virginia Tech
25	Indiana State

== Collegiate Baseball ==
Currently, only the final poll from the 1985 season is available.

Rank	Team
1	Miami (FL)
2	Texas
3	Arkansas
4	Mississippi State
5	Oklahoma State
6	Stanford
7	Arizona
8	South Carolina
9	Pepperdine
10	Michigan
11	Florida
12	Fresno State
13	Wichita State
14	Lamar
15	Oklahoma
16	Nebraska
17	Georgia Tech
18	La Salle
19	Oral Roberts
20	Florida State
21	New Orleans
22	Houston
23	Virginia
24	LSU
25	BYU
26	Western Carolina
27	Eastern Kentucky
28	California
29	Oregon State
30	Old Dominion
