= 1985 NCAA Division I baseball tournament =

- Season: 1985
- Teams: 38
- Finals site: Johnny Rosenblatt Stadium; Omaha, NE
- Champions: Miami (FL) (2nd title)
- Runner-up: Texas (23rd CWS Appearance)
- Winning coach: Ron Fraser (2nd title)
- MOP: Greg Ellena (Miami (FL))
- Television: ESPN

The 1985 NCAA Division I baseball tournament was played at the end of the 1985 NCAA Division I baseball season to determine the national champion of college baseball. The tournament concluded with eight teams competing in the College World Series, a double-elimination tournament in its thirty-ninth year. Eight regional competitions were held to determine the participants in the final event. Five regions held a four-team, double-elimination tournament while three regions included six teams, resulting in 38 teams participating in the tournament at the conclusion of their regular season, and in some cases, after a conference tournament. The thirty-ninth tournament champion was Miami (FL), coached by Ron Fraser. The Most Outstanding Player was Greg Ellena of Miami (FL).

== Regionals ==
The tournament's opening rounds were played across eight regional sites across the country, each consisting of either a four-team field or a six-team field. Each regional tournament is double-elimination, however region brackets are variable depending on the number of teams remaining after each round. The winners of each regional advanced to the College World Series.

Bold indicates winner.

=== Atlantic Regional at Coral Gables, FL ===
Upper round 1
**Miami (FL)**	**22**
Princeton	6
**Virginia**	**14**
Florida	1
Lower round 1
Princeton	4
**Florida**	**14**

Upper final
**Miami (FL)**	**11**
Virginia	6
Lower final
Virginia	2
**Florida**	**15**

Final
**Miami (FL)**	1	**12**
Florida	**8**	9

=== Central Regional at Austin, TX ===
First round
1	**Oklahoma**	**9**
6	Lamar	1
2	**Houston**	**11**
5	LSU	4
3	**Texas**	**4**^{12}
4	Grambling State	3

Second round
**Oklahoma**	**5**
Grambling State	2
Houston	2
**Texas**	**9**
**Lamar**	**4**
LSU	3

Third round
Oklahoma	4
**Texas**	**9**
Houston	9
**Lamar**	**10**

Semifinals
Oklahoma	5
**Lamar**	**7**

Final
**Texas**	**10**	—
Lamar	2	—

=== East Regional at Columbia, SC ===
First round
1	**Western Carolina**	**5**
6	Old Dominion	3
2	**St. John's**	**14**
5	Rider	9
3	**South Carolina**	**11**
4	La Salle	1

Second round
Western Carolina	12
**La Salle**	**13**^{10}
Old Dominion	2
**Rider**	**3**
St. John's	6
**South Carolina**	**13**
**Western Carolina**	**9**
St. John's	6

Third round
**La Salle**	**17**
Rider	12
**South Carolina**	**14**
Western Carolina	3

Final
La Salle	2	—
**South Carolina**	**7**	—

=== Midwest Regional at Stillwater, OK ===
Upper round 1
**Oklahoma State**	**8**
Minnesota	3
**Wichita State**	**12**
Oral Roberts	1
Lower round 1
Minnesota	8
**Oral Roberts**	**17**

Upper final
**Oklahoma State**	**15**
Wichita State	8
Lower final
**Wichita State**	**15**
Oral Roberts	14

Final
**Oklahoma State**	2	**10**
Wichita State	**7**	6

=== South I Regional at Starkville, MS ===
First round
**Mississippi State**	**10**
West Virginia	1
**New Orleans**	**12**^{13}
Michigan	10
Lower round 1
West Virginia	2
**Michigan**	**9**

Semi-finals
**Mississippi State**	**8**
New Orleans	4
Lower final
New Orleans	6
**Michigan**	**11**

Finals
**Mississippi State**	6	**19**
Michigan	**14**	8

=== South II Regional at Tallahassee, FL ===
First round
1	**Arkansas**	**20**
6	Eastern Kentucky	13
2	**Georgia Tech**	**7**
5	Central Michigan	6
3	**Florida State**	**11**
4	George Mason	0

Second round
**Arkansas**	**13**
George Mason	9
Georgia Tech	1
**Florida State**	**9**
**Eastern Kentucky**	**10**
Central Michigan	7

Third round
**Arkansas**	**7**
Florida State	6
**Georgia Tech**	**14**
Eastern Kentucky	13

Semifinals
Florida State	3
**Georgia Tech**	**8**

Final
**Arkansas**	**7**	—
Georgia Tech	5	—

=== West I Regional at Stanford, CA ===
Upper round 1
**Stanford**	**17**
Oregon State	3
**Nebraska**	**4**
Pepperdine	2
Lower round 1
Oregon State	1
**Pepperdine**	**6**

Upper final
**Stanford**	**9**
Nebraska	8
Lower final
Nebraska	6
**Pepperdine**	**7**

Final
**Stanford**	1	**7**
Pepperdine	**5**	1

=== West II Regional at Fresno, CA ===
Upper round 1
**Arizona**	**7**
BYU	3
**Fresno State**	**7**^{10}
California	6
Lower round 1
**BYU**	**9**
California	5

Upper final
**Arizona**	**6**
Fresno State	0
Lower final
**Fresno State**	**12**
BYU	8

Final
**Arizona**	**10**	—
Fresno State	3	—

== College World Series ==
=== Participants ===
School	Conference	Record (conference)	Head coach	CWS appearances	CWS best finish	CWS record
Arizona	Pac-10	47–20 (17–13)	Jerry Kindall	12 (last: 1980)	1st (1976, 1980)	27–22
Arkansas	SWC	49–13 (13–7)	Norm DeBriyn	1 (last: 1979)	2nd (1979)	3–2
Miami (FL)	n/a	59–15 (n/a)	Ron Fraser	7 (last: 1984)	1st (1982)	14–12
Mississippi State	SEC	48–13 (16–8)	Ron Polk	3 (last: 1981)	6th (1979, 1981)	2–6
Oklahoma State	Big 8	57–14 (19–4)	Gary Ward	12 (last: 1984)	1st (1959)	27–23
South Carolina	Metro	47–20 (n/a)	June Raines	4 (last: 1982)	2nd (1975, 1977)	9–8
Stanford	Pac-10	46–13 (23–7)	Mark Marquess	4 (last: 1983)	3rd (1967)	6–8
Texas	SWC	60–12 (16–5)	Cliff Gustafson	22 (last: 1984)	1st (1949, 1950, 1975, 1983)	51–38

=== Results ===
==== Bracket ====
Upper round 1
Arkansas	1^{14}
South Carolina	0
Mississippi State	12
Oklahoma State	3
Miami (FL)	17
Stanford	3
Texas	2
Arizona	1

Upper round 2
Arkansas	4
Mississippi State	5
Miami (FL)	1
Texas	2
Lower round 1
South Carolina	11
Oklahoma State	16
Stanford	9
Arizona	2

Upper final
Mississippi State	7
Texas	12
Lower round 2
Miami (FL)	2
Oklahoma State	1
Arkansas	10
Stanford	4

Semifinals
Texas	8^{10}
Arkansas	7
Mississippi State	5
Miami (FL)	6

Final
Texas	1	6
Miami (FL)	2	10

==== Game results ====
Date	Game	Winner	Score	Loser	Notes
May 31	Game 1	Arkansas	1–0 (14 innings)	South Carolina	
May 31	Game 2	Mississippi State	12–3	Oklahoma State	
June 1	Game 3	Miami (FL)	17–3	Stanford	
June 1	Game 4	Texas	2–1	Arizona	
June 2	Game 5	Oklahoma State	16–11	South Carolina	South Carolina eliminated
June 2	Game 6	Stanford	9–2	Arizona	Arizona eliminated
June 3	Game 7	Mississippi State	5–4	Arkansas	
June 5	Game 8	Texas	8–4	Miami (FL)	
June 6	Game 9	Arkansas	10–4	Stanford	Stanford eliminated
June 6	Game 10	Miami (FL)	2–1	Oklahoma State	Oklahoma State eliminated
June 7	Game 11	Texas	12–7	Mississippi State	Texas qualified for final
June 8	Game 12	Miami (FL)	6–5	Mississippi State	Mississippi State eliminated
June 8	Game 13	Texas	8–7 (10 innings)	Arkansas	Arkansas eliminated
June 9	Game 14	Miami (FL)	2–1	Texas	
June 11	Final	Miami (FL)	10–6	Texas	Miami wins CWS

=== All-Tournament Team ===
The following players were members of the All-Tournament Team.

Position	Player	School
P	Kevin Sheary	Miami (FL)
P	Greg Swindell	Texas
C	Chris Magno	Miami (FL)
1B	Will Clark	Mississippi State
2B	Billy Bates	Texas
3B	Jeff King	Arkansas
SS	Frank Davis	Mississippi State
OF	Dennis Cook	Texas
OF	Ralph Kraus	Arkansas
OF	Dan Van Cleve	Mississippi State
DH	Greg Ellena (MOP)	Miami (FL)

=== Notable players ===
- Arizona: Chip Hale, Tommy Hinzo, Joe Magrane, Dave Rohde
- Arkansas: Kevin Campbell, Howard Hilton, Fred Farwell, Jeff King, Jimmy Kremers, Pat Rice
- Miami (FL):
- Mississippi State: Jeff Brantley, Will Clark, Rafael Palmeiro, Bobby Thigpen
- Oklahoma State: Jeff Bronkey, Doug Dascenzo, Carlos Diaz, Gordon Dillard, Pete Incaviglia
- South Carolina: Mike Cook, Dave Hollins
- Stanford: Rubén Amaro, Jr., Jeff Ballard, Mark Davis, Jack McDowell, Al Osuna, John Ramos, Pete Stanicek
- Texas: Billy Bates, Dennis Cook, James Castillion, Rick Parker, Mark Petkovsek, Rusty Richards, Bruce Ruffin, Greg Swindell

== See also ==
- 1985 NCAA Division I softball tournament
- 1985 NCAA Division II baseball tournament
- 1985 NCAA Division III baseball tournament
- 1985 NAIA World Series
