= 2009 Arkansas Razorbacks baseball team =

American college baseball season

2009 Arkansas Razorbacks baseball

Norman Regional Champions Tallahassee Super Regional Champions

College World Series, T-3rd
- Conference: Southeastern Conference
- West
- Record: 41-24 (14-15 SEC)
- Head coach: Dave Van Horn
- Hitting coach: Todd Butler
- Pitching coach: Dave Jorn
- Home stadium: Baum Stadium

2009 Southeastern Conference baseball standings
	Conf.				Overall
Team	W		L	PCT	W		L	PCT
Eastern
No. 12 Florida ^{x}‍‍‍^{y}	19	–	11	.633	42	–	22	.656
No. 25 South Carolina ‍‍‍^{y}	17	–	13	.567	40	–	23	.635
Georgia ‍‍‍^{y}	15	–	13	.536	38	–	24	.613
Vanderbilt ‍‍‍^{y}	12	–	17	.414	37	–	27	.578
Kentucky ‍‍‍	12	–	18	.400	28	–	26	.519
Tennessee ‍‍‍	11	–	19	.367	26	–	29	.473
Western
No. 1 LSU ^{x}‍†‍‡‍^{y}	20	–	10	.667	56	–	17	.767
No. 13 Ole Miss ^{x}‍‍‍^{y}	20	–	10	.667	44	–	20	.688
Alabama ‍‍‍^{y}	18	–	11	.621	37	–	21	.638
No. 7 Arkansas ‍‍‍^{y}	14	–	15	.483	34	–	22	.607
Auburn ‍‍‍	11	–	19	.367	31	–	25	.554
Mississippi State ‍‍‍	9	–	20	.310	25	–	29	.463
x – Division champion † – Conference champion ‡ – Tournament champion y – Invited to the NCAA tournament Rankings from Baseball America

The 2009 Arkansas Razorbacks baseball team represented the University of Arkansas in baseball at the Division I level in the NCAA for the 2009 season. Dave van Horn, a former Razorback player, is the coach in his fifth year. The team clinched a berth in the 2009 College World Series with a defeat of the Florida State Seminoles on June 6. The Razorbacks' run in Omaha ended on June 19 when they were defeated by the LSU Tigers, finishing tied for third nationally with the Arizona State Sun Devils.

== Pre-season ==
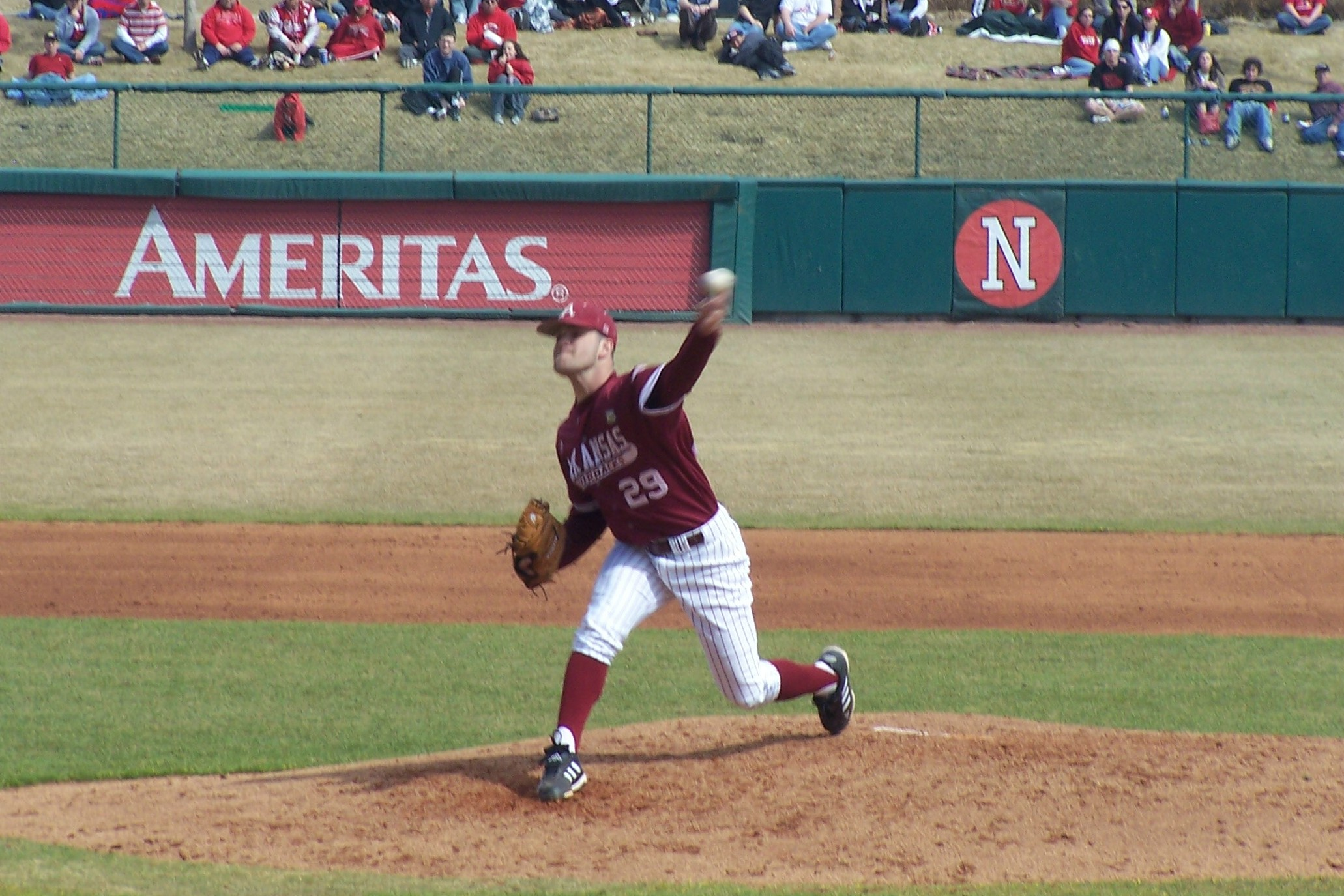
Junior Dallas Keuchel in action in 2008.

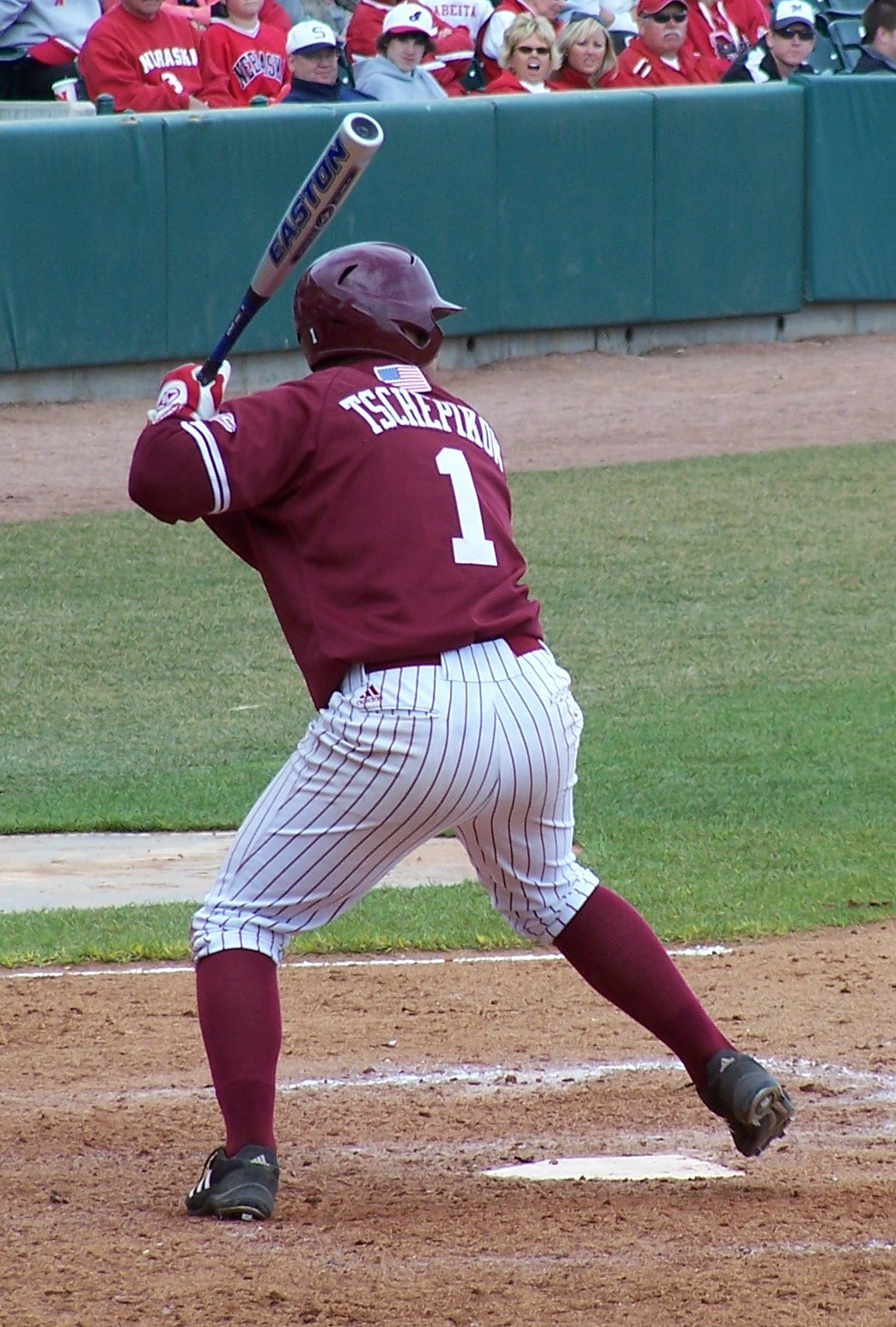
Ben Tschepikow returned as a senior infielder.

After a 34–24 record in 2008, Arkansas looked forward to 2009. On October 20, the White team defeated the Red team in the Hogs final fall practice. Despite being picked to finish fourth in the SEC West, the Hogs pulled a #22 ranking from Baseball America. This was the first time Arkansas had ever been ranked in a pre-season poll since 2007, when the team was ranked No. 7 in the nation. The Razorbacks 2009 schedule was ranked #1 hardest in the SEC by SEC baseball.com. Outfielder Chase Leavitt was named a Preseason All-SEC player by Rivals.com. The Razorbacks' recruiting class was ranked 4th best by Collegiate Baseball and 8th best by Baseball America.

== Coaches ==
Source: Baseball - 2009 Coaches

2009 Arkansas Razorbacks baseball Coaches
Name	Title
Dave van Horn	Head Coach
Todd Butler	Hitting Coach
Dave Jorn	Pitching Coach
Chris Curry	Volunteer Assistant Coach

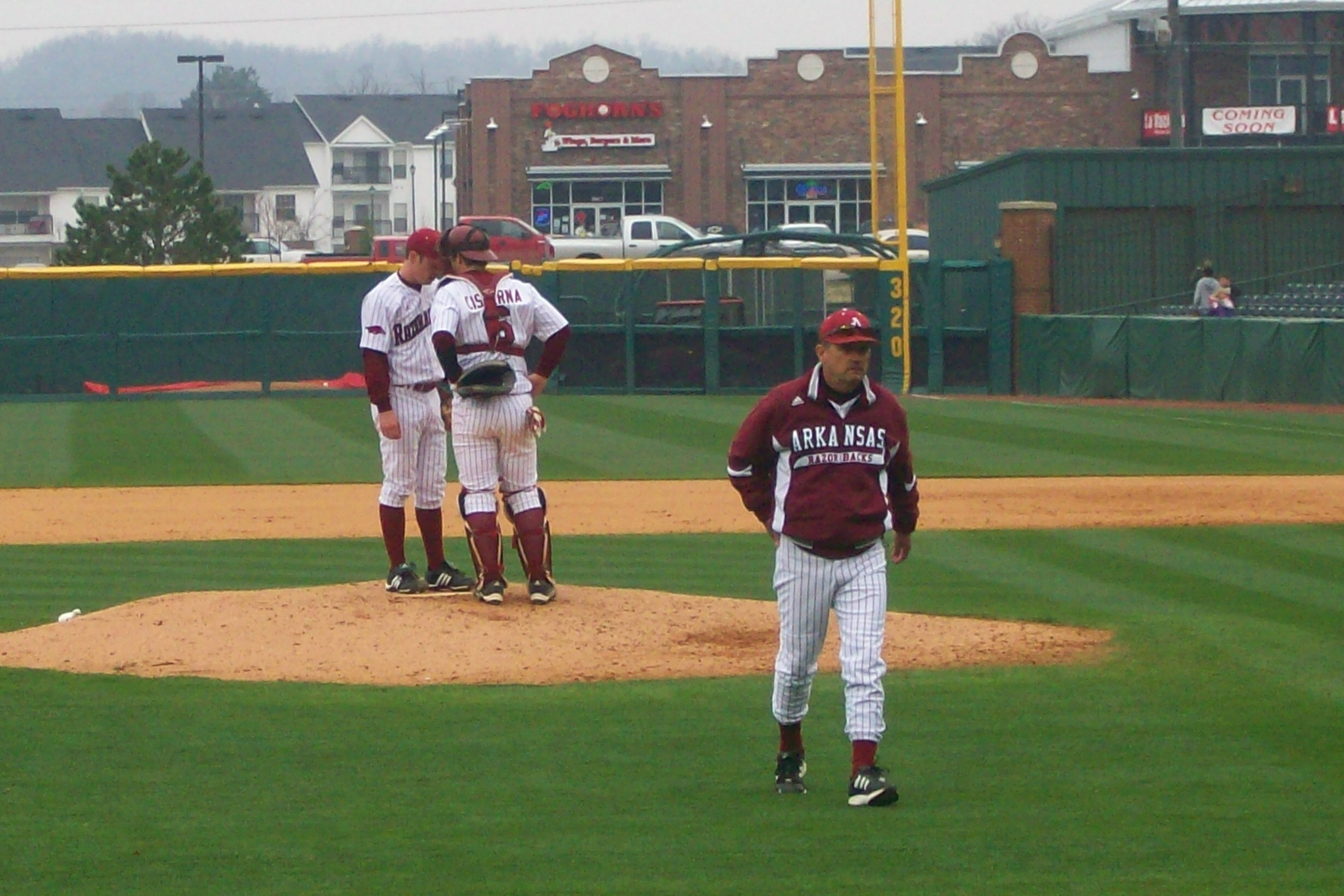
Dave van Horn

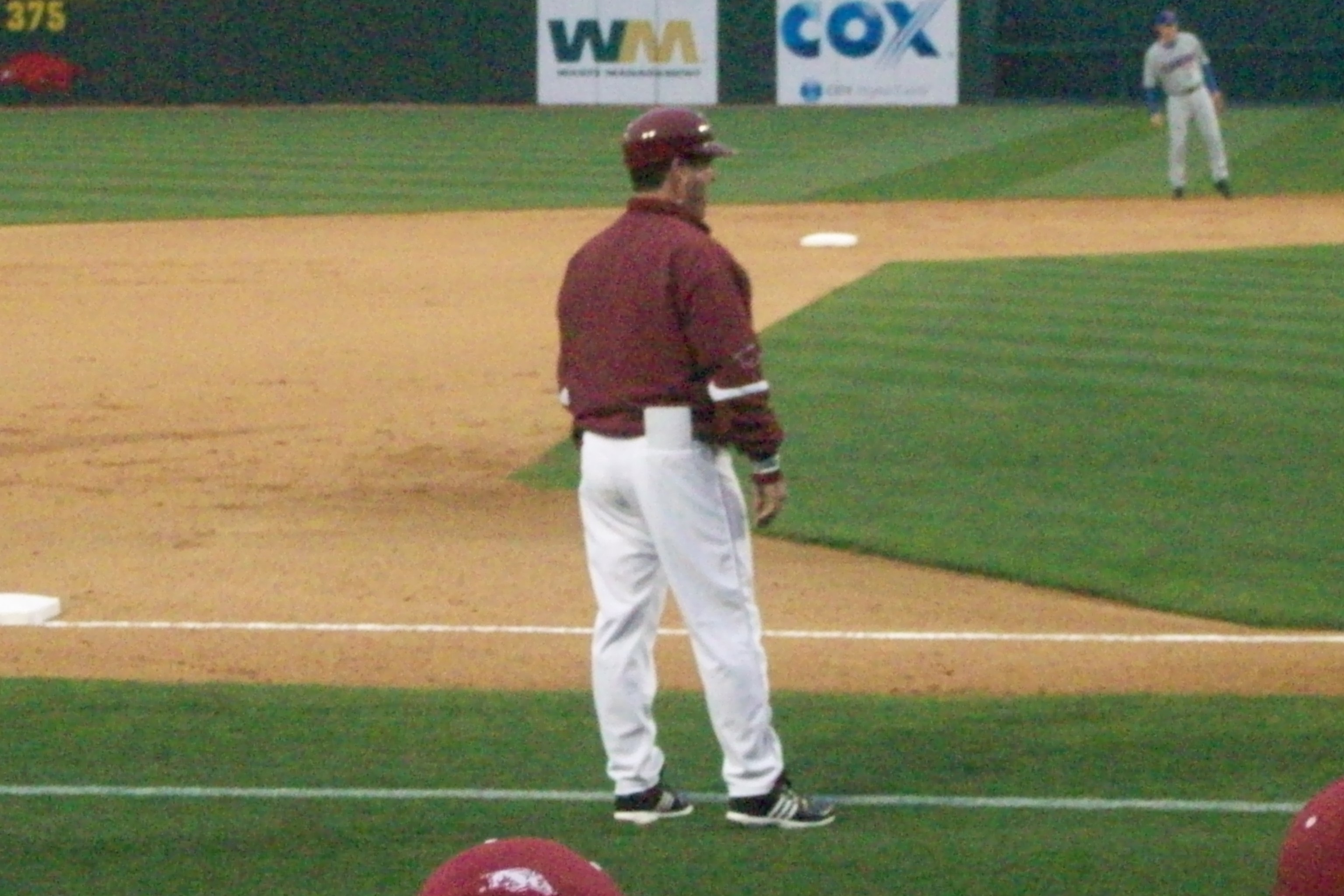
Todd Butler

Todd Butler was named coach most ready for a head coaching job by SEC coaches when polled by College Baseball Insider.

== Roster ==
2009 Arkansas Razorbacks baseball roster
Source: arkansasrazorbacks.com - The Official Site of University of Arkansas Athletics
Number	Name	Position	B/T	Height	Weight	Class	Hometown/HS/JC
1	Ben Tschepikow	INF	L/R	5-11	200	Sr.	Fayetteville, Ark./Fayetteville
3	Scott Lyons	INF	R/R	6-0	185	Sr.	Covina, Calif./Charter Oak/CSNU/Mt. San Antonio [Calif.] JC
5	Seth Gardner	OF	R/R	6-3	200	Fr.	Dallas, Texas/Highland Park
6	Ryan Cisterna	C	R/R	6-2	200	Sr.	Gilbert, Ariz./Gilbert HS/Chandler-Gilbert [Ariz.] JC
7	Zack Cox	INF/RHP	L/R	6-0	215	Fr.	Louisville, Ky./Pleasure Ridge Park
8	Chase Leavitt	INF/OF	L/R	6-0	190	Sr.	St. George, Utah/Snow Canyon/Dixie College/CCSN
9	Jacob House	OF/1B	L/L	6-3	185	So.	Mansfield, Texas/Timberview
10	Kendall Wehrle	INF	R/R	6-3	195	Fr.	Papillion, Neb./Papillion-La Vista South
11	Jonathan Perlman	INF	R/R	6-0	175	Fr.	Dallas, Texas/Highland Park
12	Bo Bigham	INF	R/R	5-11	170	Fr.	Texarkana, Ark./Arkansas
14	Jarrod McKinney	OF	R/R	6-0	200	Fr.	Hughes Springs, Texas/Hughes Springs
15	TJ Forrest	RHP	R/R	6-6	165	Jr.	Benton, La./Haughton/Bossier Parish CC
16	Travis Sample	OF	L/R	6-1	200	(redshirt) So.	Dallas, Texas/Lake Highlands/Howard JC
17	Andy Wilkins	INF	L/R	6-2	225	So.	Broken Arrow, Okla./Broken Arrow
18	Tim Carver	INF	R/R	5-11	179	(redshirt) Fr.	Fayetteville, Ark./Fayetteville
19	Thomas Hauskey	C	R/R	5-11	193	Jr.	Springdale, Ark./Springdale
20	Zac Russell	C	R/R	5-10	205	Fr.	Bulverde, Texas/Smithson Valley
21	Kyle Atkins	OF	R/R	5-11	180	Fr.	DeQueen, Ark./DeQueen
24	Brett Eibner	OF/RHP	R/R	6-4	210	So.	Houston, Texas/The Woodlands
25	Collin Kuhn	OF/INF	R/R	5-11	190	(redshirt) Fr.	Beaver Dam, Wisc./Beaver Dam
27	James McCann	C	S/R	6-3	205	Fr.	Santa Barbara, Calif./Dos Pueblos
29	Dallas Keuchel	LHP	L/L	6-3	200	Jr.	Tulsa, Okla./Bishop Kelley
30	Justin Wells	RHP	R/R	6-0	182	Sr.	Bryant, Ark./Bryant/Texarkana College
32	Mike Bolsinger	RHP	R/R	6-2	212	Jr.	McKinney, Texas/North McKinney HS/Grayson [Texas] CC
33	Drew Smyly	LHP	L/L	6-3	190	(redshirt) Fr.	Little Rock, Ark./Central
34	Jeremy Heatley	RHP	R/R	6-2	215	Jr.	Breckenridge, Texas/Breckenridge/North Lake College
35	Christian Kowalchuk	LHP	L/L	6-1	185	Jr.	Saskatoon, Saskatchewan/Seward CC
36	Scott Limbocker	LHP	L/L	6-3	220	(redshirt) Jr.	Overland Park, Kan./Blue Valley North
37	Trevor Cousineau	LHP	L/L	6-5	220	Fr.	Davison, Mich./Davison
38	Bryan Bingham	RHP	R/R	6-6	210	Jr.	Allen, Texas/Allen/Navarro College
42	James Mahler	RHP	R/R	6-6	225	So.	Sandy, Utah/Jordan
44	Andrew Darr	OF/1B	R/R	6-2	203	Sr.	Gilbert, Ariz./Mesquite/Chandler-Gilbert [Ariz.] CC
45	Sam Murphy	RHP	R/R	6-0	207	(redshirt) So.	Omaha, Neb./Westside
47	Geoffrey Davenport	LHP	L/L	6-1	160	Fr.	Ft. Worth, Texas/Paschal
48	Zack Hall	LHP	L/L	6-0	190	Fr.	Springdale, Ark./Springdale
49	Stephen Richards	LHP	L/L	5-11	175	Jr.	Plano, Texas/Plano East

== Schedule ==
2009 Game Log
Regular season

#	Date	Opponent	Location	Score	Win	Loss	Save	Att	Record	SEC
1	2/20/09	Washington State	Baum Stadium	4–2	Keuchel (1–0)	Way (0–1)	Wells (1)	8,297	1–0	
2	2/20/09	Washington State	Baum Stadium	7–5 (10)	Cox (1–0)	Shellhorn (0–1)	-	8,297	2–0	
3	2/22/09	Washington State	Baum Stadium	4–3	Wells (1–0)	Johnson (0–1)	Richards (1)	7,084	3–0	
4	2/24/09	Kansas	Baum Stadium	3–9	Ridenhour (1–0)	Eibner (0–1)	-	1,804	3–1	
5	2/25/09	Kansas	Baum Stadium	9–8 (10)	Richards (1–0)	Smyth (0–2)	-	3,109	4–1	
6	2/27/09	Western Illinois	Baum Stadium	8–7 (10)	Richards (2–0)	Fuchs (0–2)	-	2,241	5–1	
7	2/28/09	Western Illinois	Baum Stadium	Cancelled (snow)						
8	3/1/09	Western Illinois	Baum Stadium	Cancelled (cold)						
9	3/3/09	Valparaiso	Baum Stadium	7–3	Smyly (1–0)	Snelten (0–1)	Davenport (1)	1,193	6–1	
10	3/4/09	Valparaiso	Baum Stadium	9–6	Eibner (1–1)	Berry (0–2)	-	2,217	7–1	
11	3/6/09	Cal	Baum Stadium	5–4 (10)	Richards (3–0)	Petrini (0–2)	-	8,426	8–1	
12	3/7/09	Cal	Baum Stadium	6–12	Diemer (1–0)	Forrest (0–1)	Bugary (1)	6,945	8–2	
13	3/8/09	Cal	Baum Stadium	13–3	Bolsinger (1–0)	Smith (0–1)	-	6,058	9–2	
14	3/10/09	at Centenary	Sheehee Stadium	3–8	Whiting (1–0)	Eibner (1–2)	-	500	9–3	
15	3/11/09	at Centenary	Sheehee Stadium	Cancelled (rain)						
16	3/13/09	#17 Florida	Baum Stadium	11–4	Keuchel (2–0)	Bullock (0–1)	-	6,511	10–3	1-0
17	3/14/09	#17 Florida	Baum Stadium	8–4	Forrest (1–1)	Panteliodis (2–2)	-	6,840	11–3	2-0
18	3/15/09	#17 Florida	Baum Stadium	4–2	Cox (2–0)	Keating (2–3)	Richards (2)	7,411	12–3	3-0
19	3/17/09	Nebraska	Baum Stadium	7–3	Bolsinger (2–0)	Bird (0–1)	-	8,366	13–3	3-0
20	3/18/09	Nebraska	Baum Stadium	4–7	Nesseth (3–1)	Cox (2–1)	-	7,553	13–4	3-0
21	3/20/09	at Auburn	Plainsman Park	3–2	Keuchel (3–0)	Dayton (2–2)	Richards (3)	2,407	14–4	4-0
22	3/21/09	at Auburn	Plainsman Park	10–6	Richards (4–0)	Hubbard (2–1)	-	2,412	15–4	5-0
23	3/22/09	at Auburn	Plainsman Park	12–6	Smyly (2–0)	Burnside (0–2)	-	2,312	16–4	6-0
24	3/25/09	Missouri State	Baum Stadium	10–0	Eibner (2–2)	Casey (1–2)	-	8,180	17–4	6-0
25	2/26/09	Mississippi State	Baum Stadium	20–9	Keuchel (4–0)	Jones (0–2)	Wells (2)	7,331	18–4	7-0
26	2/28/09	Mississippi State	Baum Stadium	5–1	Forrest (2–1)	Whitney (2–2)	Bolsinger (1)		19–4	8-0
27	2/28/09	Mississippi State	Baum Stadium	4–12	Routt (3–1)	Smyly (2–1)	-	7,475	19–5	8-1
28	3/31/09	at Missouri State	Hammons Field	2–0	Eibner (3–2)	Meade (4–2)	Richards (4)	1,146	20–5	8-1
29	4/3/09	at #23 South Carolina	Carolina Stadium	6–4	Keuchel (5–0)	Dyson (2–2)	-	6,461	21–5	9-1
30	4/4/09	at #23 South Carolina	Carolina Stadium	1–9	Belcher (1–1)	Forrest (2–2)	-	7,239	21–6	9-2
31	4/5/09	at #23 South Carolina	Carolina Stadium	7–4	Bolsinger (3–0)	Farotto (3–2)	-	6,727	22–6	10-2
32	4/7/09	#1 Arizona State	Baum Stadium	7–3	Murphy (1–0)	Calhoun (0–1)	Richards (5)	8,342	23–6	10-2
33	4/8/09	#1 Arizona State	Baum Stadium	8–7	Cox (3–1)	Franzblau (1–2)	Richards (6)	11,434*	24–6	10-2
34	4/10/09	Vanderbilt	Baum Stadium	0–9	Minor (3–3)	Keuchel (5–1)	-	7,554	24–7	10-3
35	4/11/09	Vanderbilt	Baum Stadium	6–13	Cotham (5–3)	Forrest (2–3)	-	9,782	24–8	10-4
36	4/12/09	Vanderbilt	Baum Stadium	Cancelled (rain)						
37	4/14/09	Louisiana-Monroe	Baum Stadium	2–3	Christensen (3–2)	Bolsinger (3–1)	-	7,568	24–9	10-4
38	4/15/09	Louisiana-Monroe	Baum Stadium	10–9	Cox (4–1)	Brown (1–2)	-	7,231	25–9	10-4
39	4/17/09	at #1 Georgia	Foley Field	3–4	Harvil (4–1)	Bolsinger (3–2)	-	3,460	25–10	10-5
40	4/18/09	at #1 Georgia	Foley Field	3–4	Weaver (1–0)	Bolsinger (3–3)	-	3,128	25–11	10-6
41	4/19/09	at #1 Georgia	Foley Field	2–0	Eibner (4–2)	Grimm (2–2)	-	2,858	26–11	11-6
42	4/21/09	at Oral Roberts	J. L. Johnson Stadium	9–6	Murphy (2–0)	Griffin (0–1)	Richards (7)	2,387	27–11	11-6
43	4/24/09	at Tennessee	Lindsey Nelson Stadium	9–3	Keuchel (6–1)	Harris (4–3)	Wells (3)	2,075	28–11	12-6
44	4/25/09	at Tennessee	Lindsey Nelson Stadium	4–5	Morgado (2–1)	Bolsinger (3–4)	-	1,449	28–12	12-7
45	4/26/09	at Tennessee	Lindsey Nelson Stadium	15–8 (8)	Wells (2–0)	Harris (4–4)	Richards (8)	1,998	29–12	13-7
46	4/28/09	#9 Oklahoma	Baum Stadium	8–7 (10)	Cox (5–1)	Duke (2–1)	-	8,529	30–12	13-7
47	5/2/09	#4 LSU	Baum Stadium	11–4	Keuchel (7–1)	Ranaudo (5–3)	-	8,759	31–12	14-7
48	5/2/09	#4 LSU	Baum Stadium	0–5	Coleman (9–2)	Forrest (2–4)	-	8,759	31–13	14-8
49	5/3/09	#4 LSU	Baum Stadium	3–4	Ross (5–5)	Eibner (4–3)	Ott (11)	8,108†	31–14	14-9
50	5/8/09	at #21 Alabama	Sewell-Thomas Stadium	1–2	Hyatt (8–1)	Keuchel (7–2)	-	4,922	31–15	14-10
51	5/9/09	at #21 Alabama	Sewell-Thomas Stadium	6–8	Kilcrease (4–2)	Murphy (2–1)	-	4,789	31–16	14-11
52	5/10/09	at #21 Alabama	Sewell-Thomas Stadium	5–6	Scott (3–1)	Eibner (4–4)	Kilcrease (2)	3,835	31–17	14-12
53	5/12/09	Oral Roberts	Baum Stadium	3–2	Richards (5–0)	Bowen (2–1)	-	7,015	32–17	14-12
54	5/14/09	#9 Ole Miss	Baum Stadium	5–7	Pomeranz (6–3)	Keuchel (7–3)	Morgan (8)	7,280	32–18	14-13
55	5/15/09	#9 Ole Miss	Baum Stadium	3–9	Bukvich (9–2)	Forrest (2–5)	Baker (1)	8,948	32–19	14-14
56	5/16/09	#9 Ole Miss	Baum Stadium	3–16	Irwin (7–3)	Wells (2–1)	-	8,156	32–20	14-15
* denotes then-Baum Stadium record for single-game attendance. † denotes record for most tickets sold in a single season Arkansas set season attendance records for tickets sold (269,216) and actual attendance (173,946).

SEC Tournament

#	Date	Opponent	Location	Score	Win	Loss	Save	Record	SEC Tourney Record
1	5/20/09	#9 Florida	Regions Park	8–5	Bolsinger (4–4)	Locke (4–2)	Richards (9)	33–20	1-0
2	5/21/09	#21 Georgia	Regions Park	1–2 (10)	Weaver (4–2)	Richards (5–1)	-	33–21	1-1
3	5/22/09	#9 Florida	Regions Park	10–7	Murphy (3–1)	Larson (3–2)	Cox (1)	34–21	2-1
4	5/23/09	Vanderbilt	Regions Park	1–11 (7)	Cotham (6–5)	Forrest (2–6)	-	34–22	2-2

NCAA tournament: Norman Regional

#	Date	Opponent	Location	Score	Win	Loss	Save	Att	Record	NCAAT Record
1	5/29/09	#24 Washington St.	L. Dale Mitchell Baseball Park	10–3	Bolsinger (5–4)	Johnson (6–2)	-	1,636	35–22	1-0
2	5/30/09	#9 Oklahoma	L. Dale Mitchell Baseball Park	17–6	Eibner (5–4)	Rocha (5–3)	-	3,064	36–22	2-0
3	5/31/09	#9 Oklahoma	L. Dale Mitchell Baseball Park	11–0	Smyly (3–1)	Hubbard	-	2,333	37–22	3-0

NCAA tournament: Tallahassee Super Regional

#	Date	Opponent	Location	Score	Win	Loss	Save	Att	Record	NCAAT Record
4	6/7/09	#5 Florida State	Dick Howser Stadium	7–2	Bolsinger (6–4)	Parker (6–2)	-	3,784	38–22	4-0
5	6/8/09	#5 Florida State	Dick Howser Stadium	9–8	Richards (6–1)	Posey (0–1)	-	4,581	39–22	5-0

NCAA tournament: College World Series

#	Date	Opponent	Location	Score	Win	Loss	Save	Att	Record	NCAAT Record
6	6/13/09	#3 Cal State Fullerton	Rosenblatt Stadium	10–6	Keuchel (8–3)	Ramirez (9–2)	Bolsinger (2)	23,549	40–22	6-0
7	6/15/09	#1 LSU	Rosenblatt Stadium	1–9	Coleman (14–2)	Eibner (5–5)	-	23,417	40–23	6-1
8	6/17/09	#6 Virginia	Rosenblatt Stadium	4–3 (12)	Keuchel (9–3)	Carraway (9–2)	-	21,383	41–23	7-1
9	6/19/09	#1 LSU	Rosenblatt Stadium	4–15	Ranaudo (11–3)	Richards (6–2)	-	19,734	41–24	7-2

=== February ===
==== Washington State ====
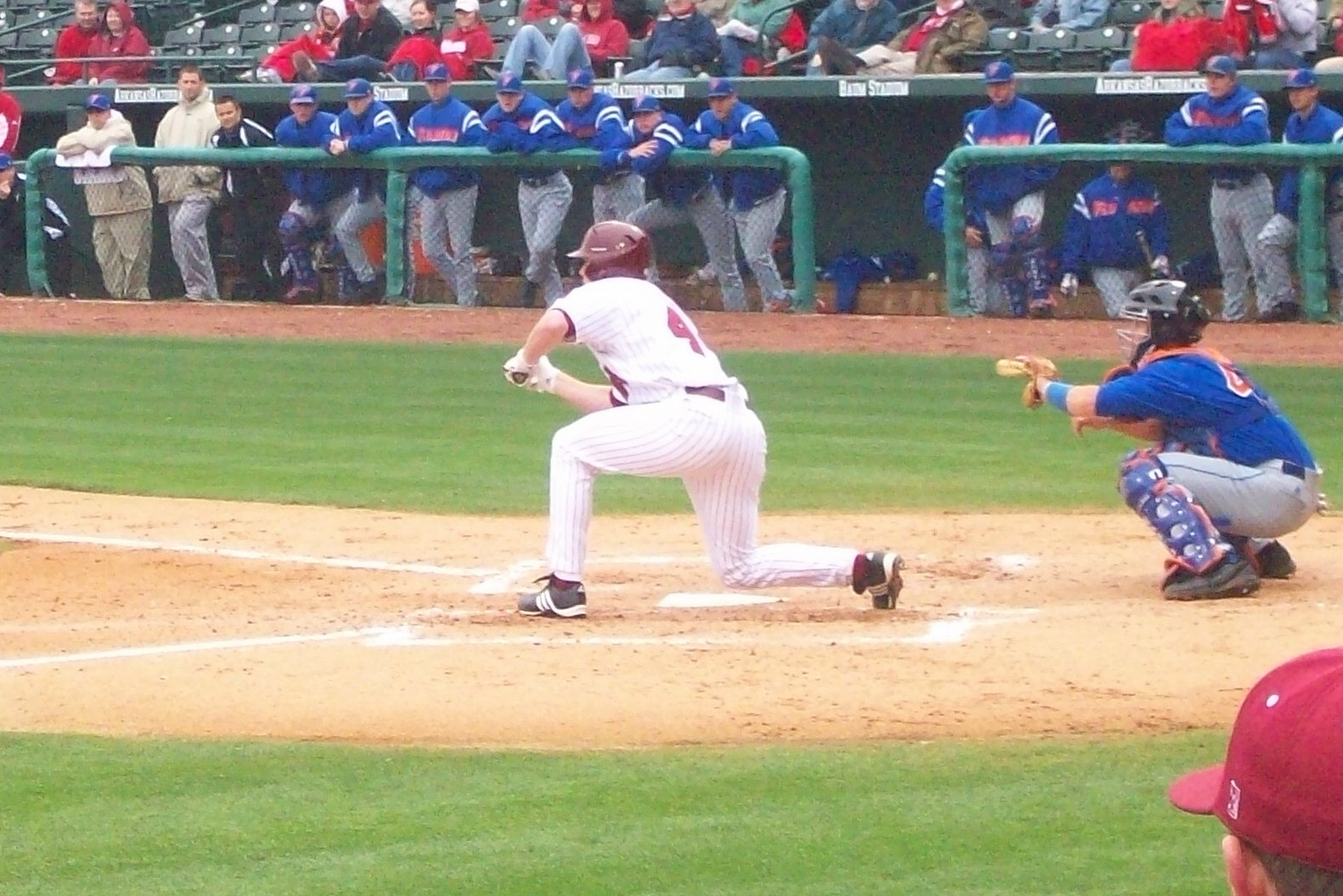
Darr bunts later in the year.

The Razorbacks began the season with three games against Washington State. The schedule was changed to a doubleheader on February 20 due to cold weather. Ben Tschepikow, a senior infielder, hit a 2-run home run in the fourth inning that provided the winning margin. The second game was ended Andrew Darr's walk-off home run. The next game took place on February 22, and Darr was again the hero, this time in the form of a squeeze. Arkansas was ranked 22nd in most polls for the series.

==== Kansas ====
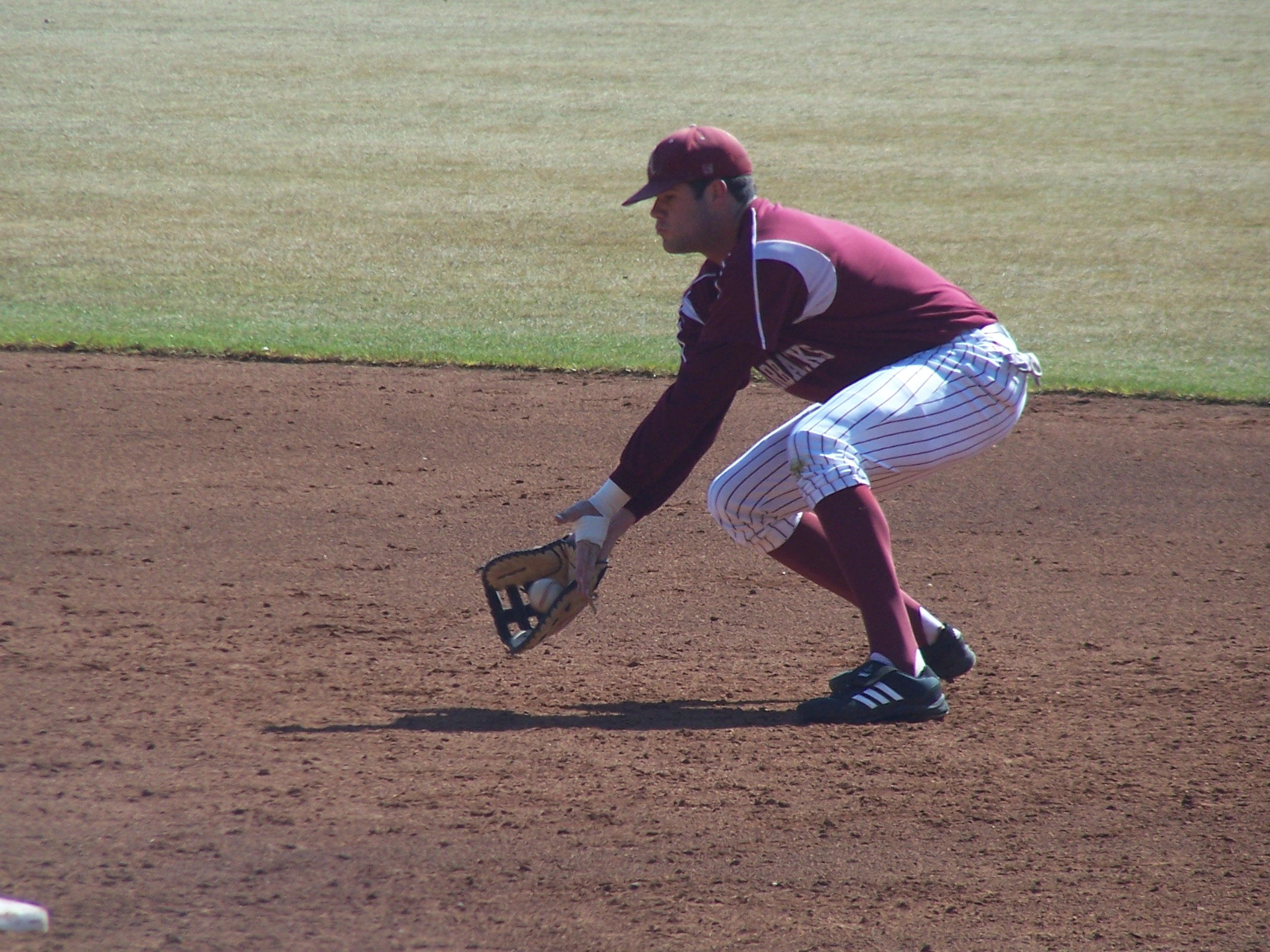
House hit a walk-off home run against the Jayhawks on March 25.

Kansas came to Fayetteville for a two-game series with the Diamond Hogs from February 24–27. After dropping the opener pitched by Brett Eibner, the Hogs won the next contest on a Jacob House walk-off home run. House, an occasional starter at first base, entered the game as a pinch hitter in the eighth and delivered a liner that got past the Jayhawk first baseman. The Sophomore delivered again, a walk-off home run in the 10th inning which gave the Razorbacks the win.

==== Western Illinois ====
The Razorbacks began a three-game series against the Leathernecks of Western Illinois University, a game that was won on a Brett Eibner triple in the tenth inning. Stephen Richards, a junior pitcher, earned his second consecutive win in the game. The remaining two games were cancelled due to a snowstorm.

=== March ===
==== Valparaiso ====
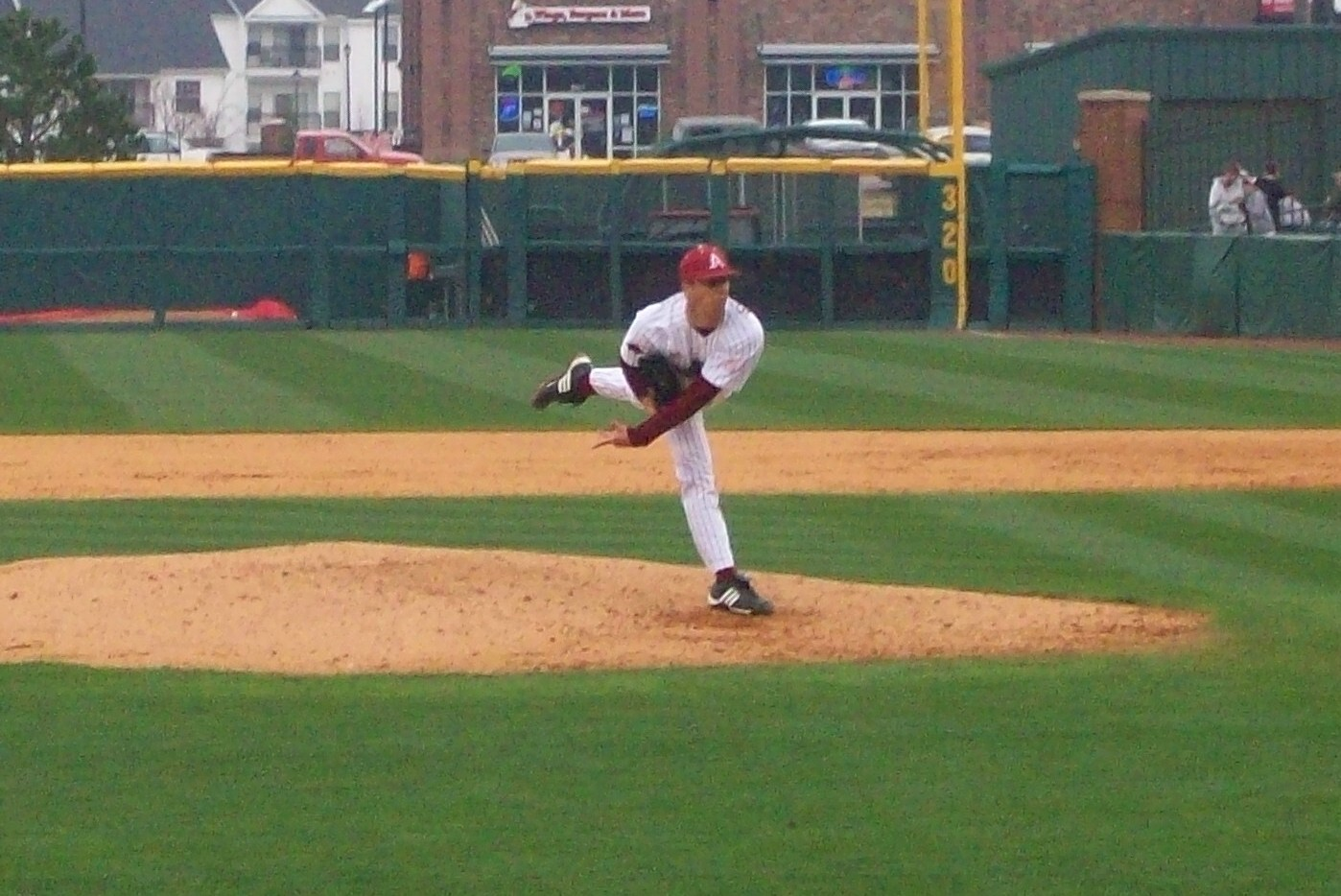
Richards later in the year.

Redshirt freshman Drew Smyly quieted the Crusader's bats, while Bo Bigham ignited the Razorback sticks, ending in a 7–3 Hog win on March 3. The two teams met in Baum Stadium met again on March 4, with Andy Wilkins swatting his fourth home run of the year. Valpo began to claw back into the game late, but Stephen Richards pitched a scoreless ninth, giving the Hogs a 9–6 win. Arkansas was ranked #21 in most polls throughout the series with Valpo.

==== California ====
The Razorbacks met their second Pac-10 team, the California Golden Bears, in Baum Stadium. Game 1 was packed with excitement, including a tying home run by Ben Tschepikow in the bottom of the ninth with two outs, and a game winning squeeze by Collin Kuhn. Game two was marred by Razorback errors, giving the 12–6 decision to Cal despite Chase Leavitt going 3 for 3 with two walks. Drew Smyly delivered a strong outing against the Bears in game three, with Leavitt producing a four hit game. Eibner and Darr hit home runs and Zack Cox hit a triple, giving the Hogs the game and series. Arkansas broke their previous attendance record for a non-conference series with the three game set against Cal, when a total of 21,429 fans attended the three game series.

==== Centenary ====
Arkansas hit the road for the first time in 2009 for a midweek series with Centenary College of Louisiana. The Hogs had won 25 straight games against the Gentlemen before a 5–1 defeat in 2008. Game 1 ended in an 8–3 Razorback defeat, and the second game was rained out.

==== #17 Florida ====
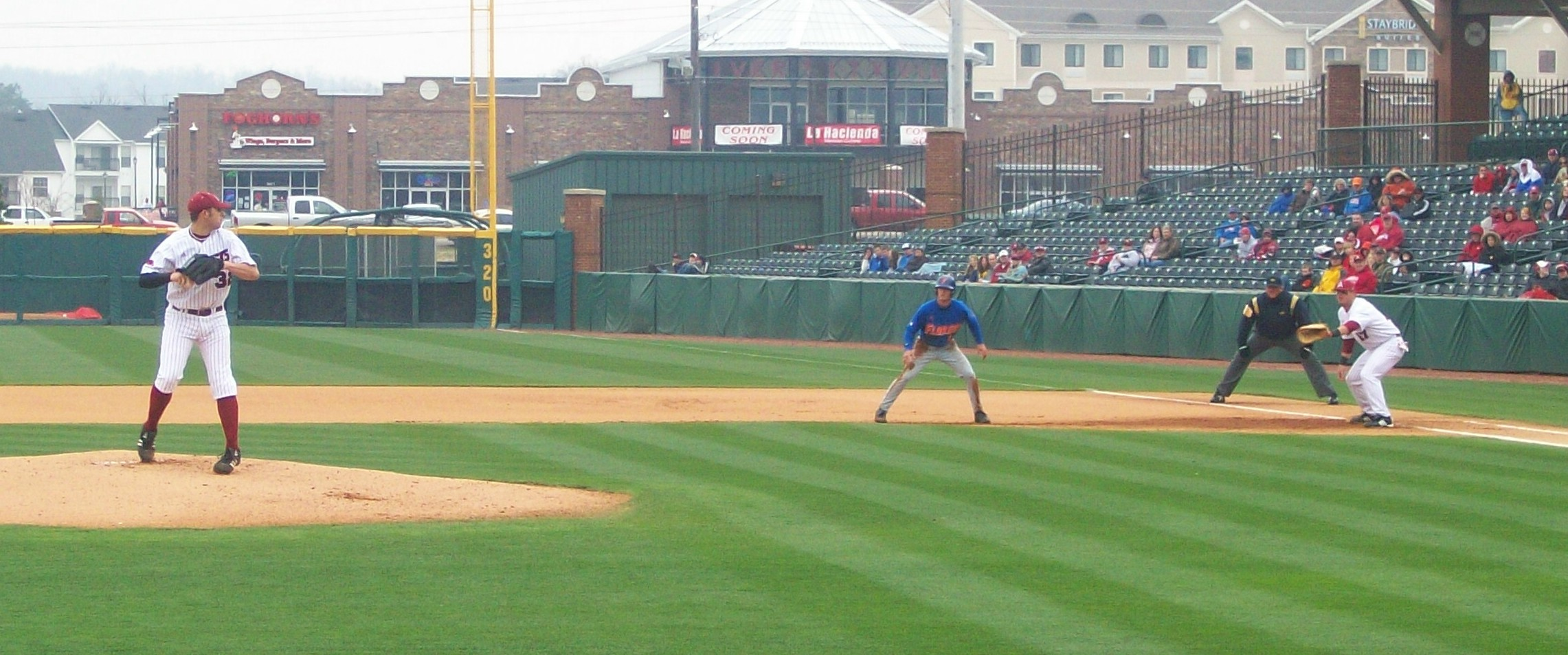
Mike Bolsinger picks off UF outfielder Avery Barnes in game 2.

The Gators came to Fayetteville for a three-game SEC series. This was the conference opener for both squads. The first game was a decisive Razorbacks victory, with Dallas Keuchel earning the 11–4 win. On the following day, Arkansas defeated the Gators 8–4 thanks to a six run second inning. The Sunday game was tied 2–2 until the eighth inning, when Brian McKinney cut and missed on a 3–2 pitch that went into the dirt. The runner advanced to first, when he unintentionally kicked the ball out of UF catcher Buddy Munroe's range. This allowed Ben Tschepikow to score from third base giving the Hogs the lead. Munroe argued that the kick was intentional, a case also argued by Florida coach Kevin O'Sullivan. O'Sullivan was ejected and the Razorbacks tacked on an extra run, giving the Hogs a 4–2 win, 3–0 SEC record, and sweep of Florida.

==== Nebraska ====
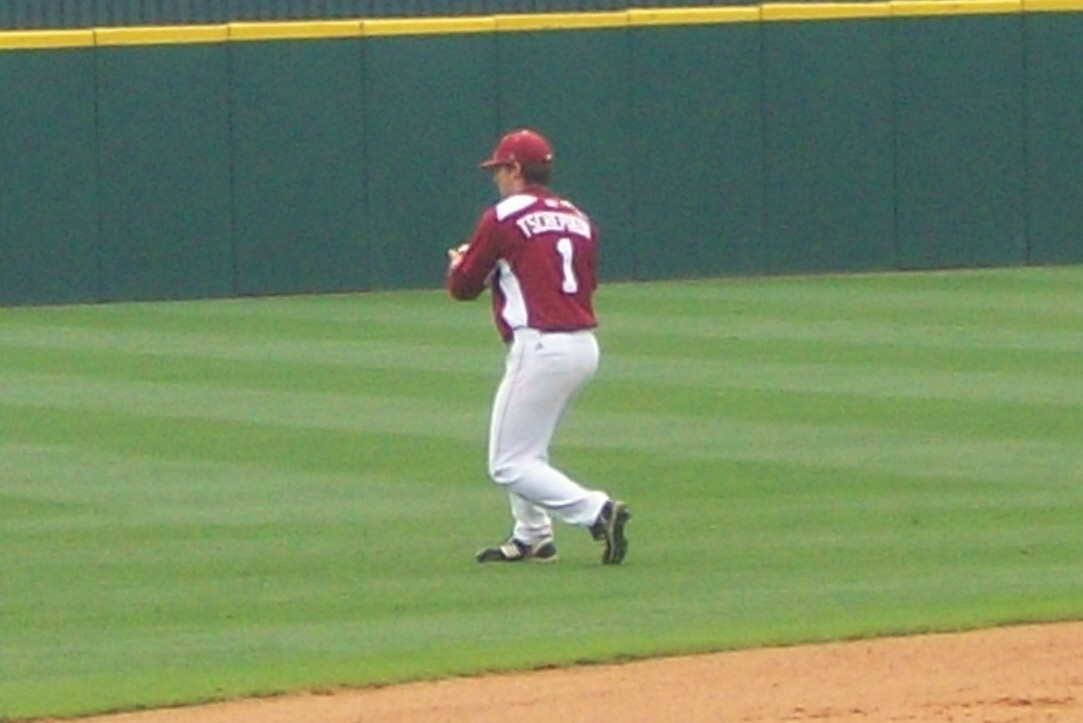
Ben Tschepikow's 11-game hitting streak ended in the second game against the Cornhuskers.

The Razorbacks were 7–7 against Nebraska entering the two-game series. In the first game, the Hogs wore green hats for Saint Patrick's Day, and seven different Razorbacks got a hit on the way to a 7–3 Arkansas victory. The second game was led 4–1 by Arkansas until a six-run ninth inning. Andy Wilkins hit two home runs in the contest.

==== Auburn ====
Arkansas entered Plainsman Park on March 20 for a three-game series with Auburn. The first game was a 3–2 Arkansas victory decided by a Ryan Cisterna ninth-inning home run. The next day, Chase Leavitt, Scott Lyons, Jacob House and Collin Kuhn each had two hits in a 10–6 defeat of the Tigers, giving Arkansas a 5–0 start in the SEC for the first time in Razorbacks history. The third game was decided by a four-run first inning, with Ben Tschepikow collecting four hits in the game.

==== Missouri State ====
The Missouri State Bears came to Fayetteville for a single game, a 10–0 Razorbacks win. The Hogs recorded 18 strikeouts, a school record, with Brett Eibner striking out seven.

==== Mississippi State ====
Mississippi State traveled to Arkansas to meet the Razorbacks, who were 3–0 in SEC play. The first game was suspended by rain, but ended a 20–9 Razorbacks win. Dallas Keuchel's outing was ended prematurely when rain poured, suspending the game in the fifth inning. After game 1 was completed, the two teams decided to play a doubleheader of seven innings games on Sunday. T. J. Forrest started the afternoon on the mound for the Razorbacks, winning a 5–1 decision. The second game of the day was dropped to the Bulldogs, 12-4. MSU leadoff man Grant Hogue went 4 for 4, scoring 4 runs.

==== Missouri State ====
The Bears entered the contest winning nine of ten, but again met Brett Eibner, whose two solo home runs thrust the Hogs to a 2–0 victory. The win pushed the Razorbacks' March record to 15-4.

=== April ===
==== #23 South Carolina ====
Dallas Keuchel earned the win as Zack Cox hit a three-run home run to give the Razorbacks the first game of a three-game series, played in brand-new Carolina Stadium. The Gamecocks returned the following day and issued the Hogs a 9–1 thumping, with Scott Lyons driving in the only Razorbacks run. Arkansas would pull out the rubber game, however, a 7–4 victory for Mike Bolsinger.

==== #1 Arizona State ====
The #1 Arizona State Sun Devils came to Fayetteville for the back end of a two-year home-and-home midweek series, with Arkansas also ranked #1 entering the game. The Hogs dropped both games to ASU in 2008, but returned the favor in 2009. Game 1 marked the first #1 vs #1 matchup in Baum Stadium, and Game 2 set the then-Baum record for highest attendance, with 11,434 patrons witnessing the Hogs 8–7 victory.

The first game featured a five-run Razorback seventh inning, sparked by a leadoff walk to Chase Leavitt followed by Tom Hauskey, Ben Tschepikow, Andrew Darr, and Scott Lyons all recording hits in the inning. Stephen Richards recorded his fifth save as the game ended a 7–3 Razorbacks win. Arkansas then defeated ASU a second time on April 8, an 8–7 win. The game was decided by Tim Carver single in the fifth inning, completing the transformation from a 6–1 deficit in the third inning.

==== Vanderbilt ====
Arkansas and Vanderbilt met in Baum Stadium for a three-game SEC series. The Razorbacks, fresh off two victories over number 1 Arizona State, dropped both games, with the third being cancelled due to rain. In the two games, Arkansas committed eight errors and gave up a nine-run inning. The offense was also inept, being shut out in game 1 and no-hit through the fifth inning in game 2. Mike Minor of Vanderbilt struck out eleven Razorback batters, only to be one-upped by Caleb Cotham's striking out twelve the following day. The two losses marked the first time Arkansas dropped consecutive games in 2009 as well as the first lost series for the Hogs. The two wins gave Vanderbilt their first series win in Baum Stadium.

==== Louisiana-Monroe ====
The Hogs and Warhawks met for a midweek series on April 14 and 15. The series was split, with the Warhaks taking the first game 3-2. West Covina, California native Scott Lyons won game two in the tenth inning for the Razorbacks, launching a walk-off home run into the Hogs' bullpen.

==== #1 Georgia ====
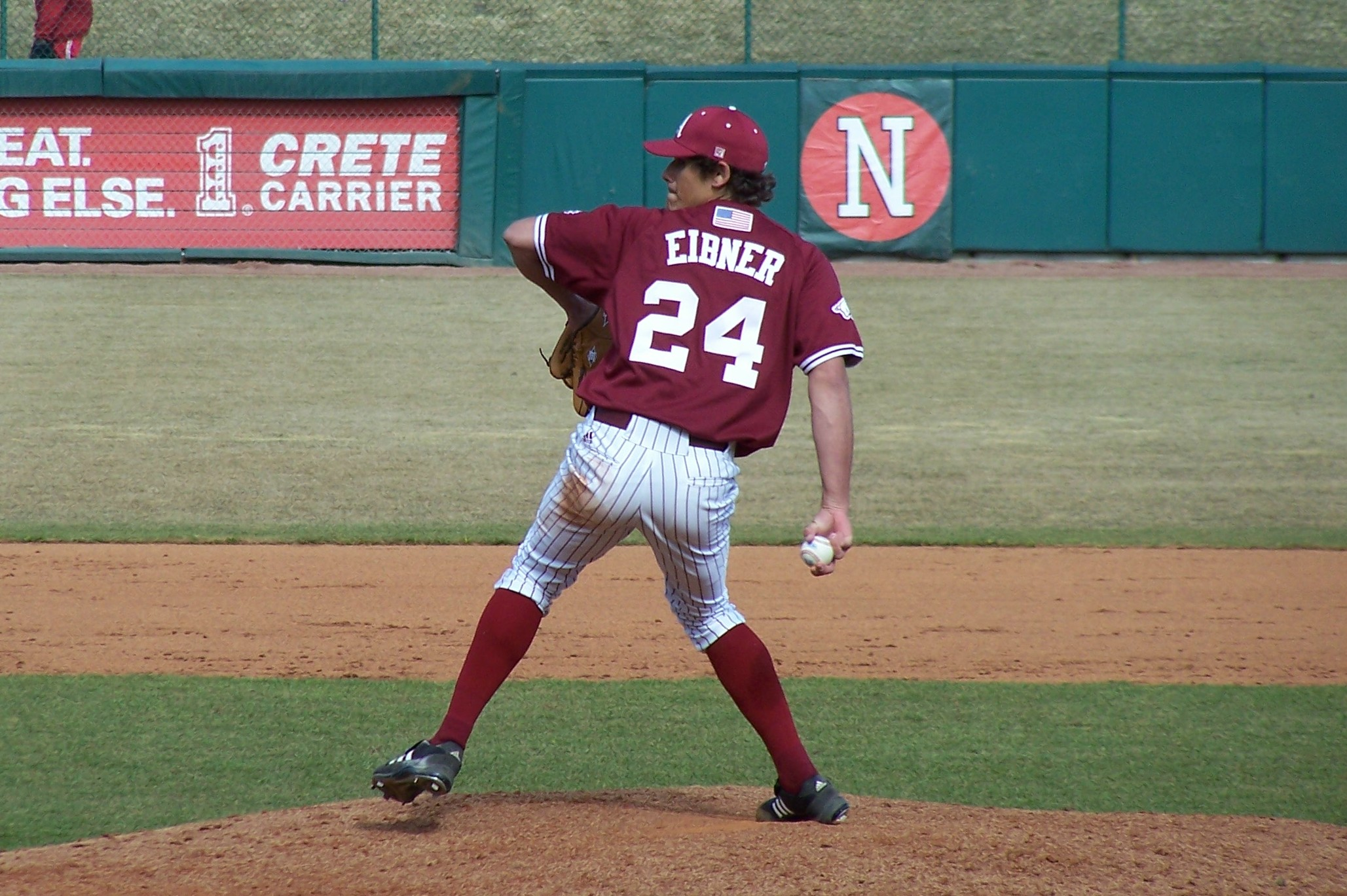
Brett Eibner on the mound in 2008.

Arkansas dropped to #5 after dropping three of four games, and traveled to Athens to play the new #1. Dallas Keuchel threw a strong seven innings, but the Hogs lost 3–4 in game 1. The second game would also be dropped 3-4, this time on a Matt Cerione single in the ninth inning. Razorback sophomore Brett Eibner tossed a gem in game three, preventing the sweep. The Woodlands, Texas, native Eibner threw a complete game one-hit shutout, striking out twelve Bulldogs. The feat garnered Eibner SEC and National Player of the Week honors.

==== Oral Roberts ====
The Oral Roberts Golden Eagles hosted the Hogs for one game at J. L. Johnson Stadium in Tulsa, Oklahoma. The Hogs prevailed from a 9–6 contest with Zack Cox collecting four hits. The Razorbacks met Oral Roberts again, this time in Baum Stadium, on May 12.

==== Tennessee ====
Arkansas and Tennessee met for an SEC series in Knoxville, Tennessee. The Razorbacks took game 1, 9-3, behind a strong outing by Dallas Keuchel and Jacob House's 4 RBI. The subsequent game was lost on a failed pickoff attempt by Razorback Stephen Richards, who leads the team in saves. The Plano, Texas, native made an errant throw attempting to pickoff Volunteer P.J. Polk, who was on first base with two outs in the bottom of the ninth. The Hogs would take the game three slugfest, 15-8, behind Scott Lyons' two home runs.

==== #9 Oklahoma ====
Arkansas met the #9 Oklahoma Sooners once in Baum Stadium. Brett Eibner took over the game, hitting a tying two-run home run in the bottom of the ninth (his second long ball of the day) and drawing a walk-off walk in the tenth. With the bases loaded and two outs, Eibner was down 0-2 and fouled off six pitches during the twelve-pitch at bat before drawing ball four.

=== May ===
==== #4 L. S. U. ====
The LSU Fighting Tigers held a one-game lead over the Razorbacks entering this series, which is a heated rivalry. A rain delay caused Game 1 and Game 2 to become a doubleheader on May 2. Dallas Keuchel was outstanding on the mound in game 1, throwing 8.1 innings, allowing only four runs. The Razorbacks scored four runs in the fourth inning, but the fans held their breath when catcher Ryan Cisterna was hit in the face by an Anthony Raunado fastball. Raunado would hit Eibner later, causing umpires to issue warnings, and an LSU relief pitcher would also hit Zack Cox in the contest. Game 2 would have another outstanding pitching performance, this time by LSU's Louis Coleman. He delivered a two-hit shutout, splitting the series' first two games. The Sunday contest ended when a Razorback's rally fell one run short, 4-3.

==== #21 Alabama ====
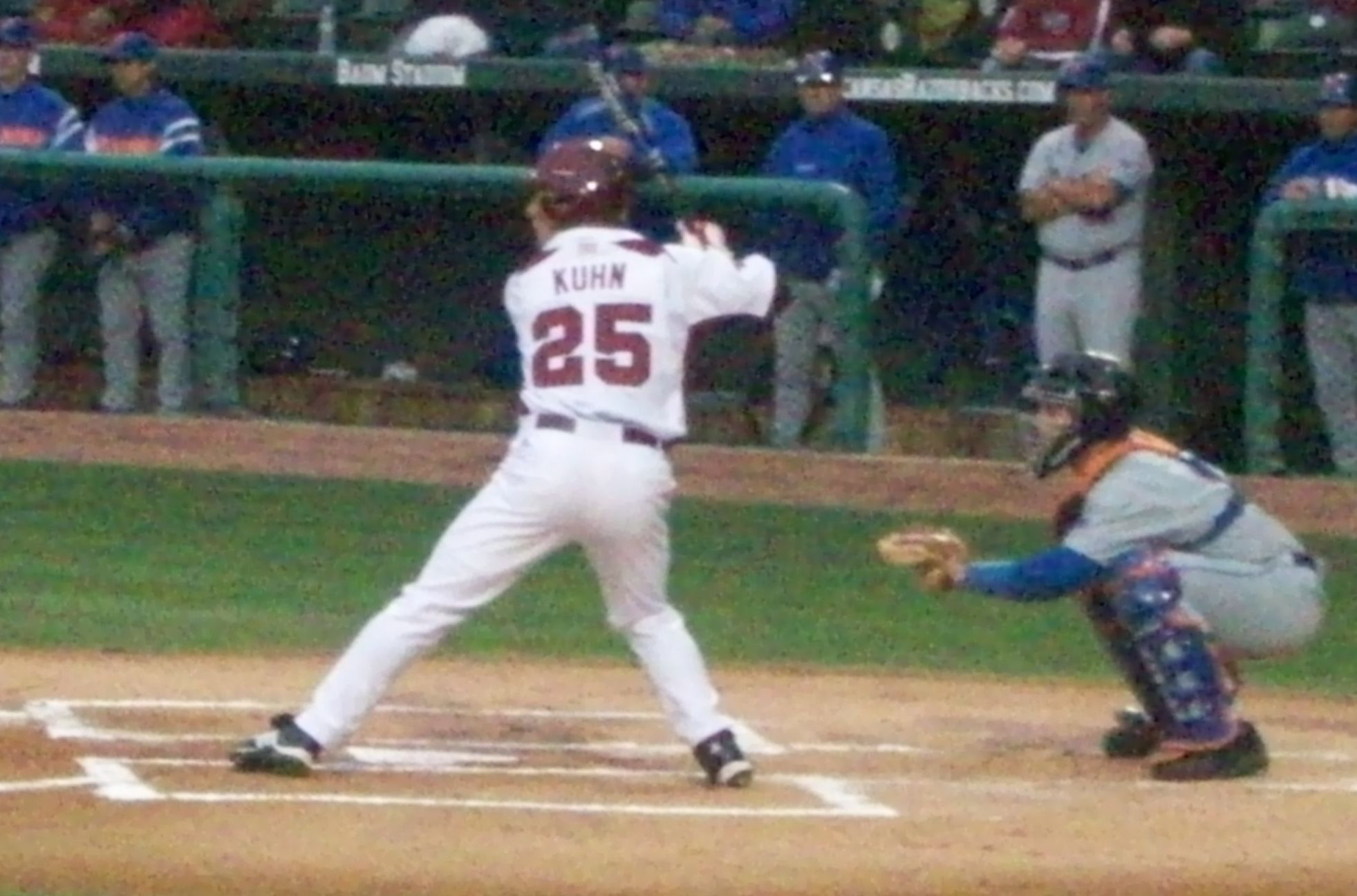
Collin Kuhn is a Beaver Dam, Wisconsin native.

Arkansas and Alabama squared off in Tuscaloosa for a critical SEC series. The Hogs would be swept by the Crimson Tide. Dallas Keuchel turned in a great performance, but had no run support and lost a 2–1 decision. The Hogs lost game two 8-6, with freshman outfielder Collin Kuhn homering twice. Alabama homered four times in game three, taking a 5–6 decision from Brett Eibner.

Arkansas clinched a berth in the 2009 SEC baseball tournament when Auburn defeated Kentucky on May 9.

==== Oral Roberts ====
Arkansas snapped a season-long five game losing skid with a victory over Oral Roberts. The offense continued to struggle, but managed to eke three runs across, the third by Scott Lyons in the bottom of the ninth.

==== #9 Ole Miss ====
Arkansas committed four errors in the opener with Ole Miss, resulting in a 7–5 loss. The Razorbacks also dropped game two due to a six run seventh inning for the Rebels. The Rebels also won game three on the Razorbacks' senior night. The Razorbacks entered the SEC Tournament as the #7 seed.

=== SEC tournament ===
Arkansas played the first game of the tournament, an 8–5 defeat of #9 Florida. The Hogs next matched up with the #21 Georgia Bulldogs. The game entered the tenth inning tied 1–1 when a Georgia batter hit a bases loaded liner to Zack Cox. Cox delivered home but catcher Ryan Cisterna could not keep his foot on home plate, allowing Matt Ceronie to score the winning run. Arkansas played Florida again in an elimination game on May 22. Arkansas again defeated the Gators, the fifth time this season. The win marked the first time Arkansas beat the same SEC opponent five times in one year since joining the league. Zack Cox hit a home run that crushed the scoreboard, described by announcers as the "longest home run they had seen in Hoover". Vanderbilt would crush the Razorbacks in the semifinal game, 11-1. The game was ended prematurely due to the mercy rule, ending the Razorbacks run in the SEC Tournament.

=== NCAA tournament: Norman Regional ===
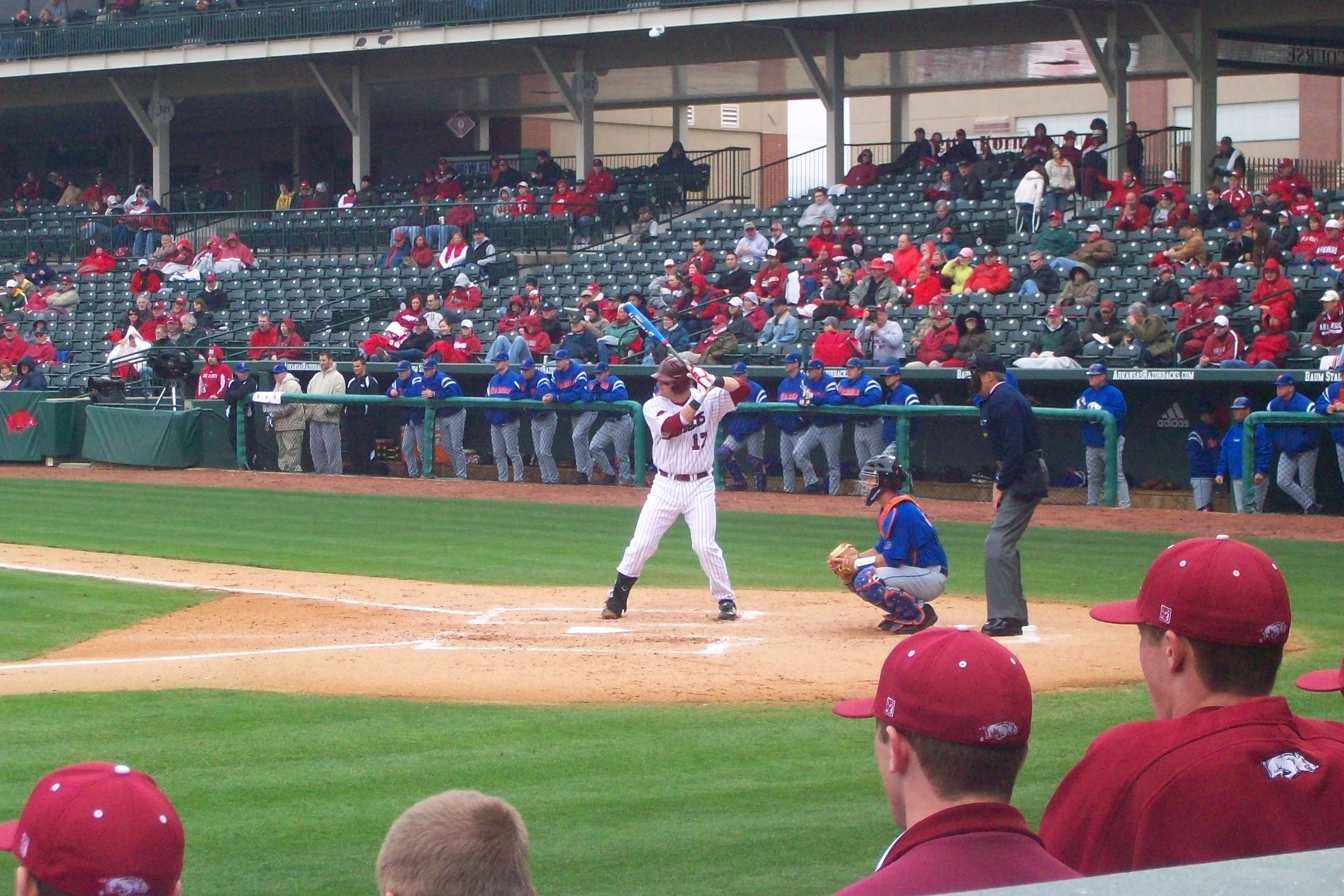
Sophomore Andy Wilkins hit two home runs in game two against Oklahoma.

Arkansas received an invitation to play in the Norman regional as a #2 seed. The games are hosted by the Oklahoma Sooners, with L. Dale Mitchell Baseball Park hosting all games played in the regional among #21 Arkansas, #9 Oklahoma, #23 Washington State, and Wichita State. Arkansas defeated Washington State on May 29 by the score of 10-3. The Hogs took advantage of a great catch by Jarrod McKinney and a nine run eight inning to beat the Cougars for the fourth time this year.

Arkansas would play #9 Oklahoma next due to the Sooner's win over Wichita State. The game would be a 17–6 Arkansas victory, with Scott Lyons, James McCann, Ben Tschepikow, and Andy Wilkins all collecting at least three hits. The team collected 20 hits in the contest, a season high.

The Razorbacks played Oklahoma again on May 31, an elimination game for the Sooners. Razorbacks freshman pitcher Drew Smyly threw fell two outs short of a no-hitter, with the offense scoring eleven runs. Andy Wilkins (a Broken Arrow, Oklahoma native) went 5–5 at the plate with two doubles, two home runs, four runs scored and five RBI.

The win pushed Arkansas into its third super regional, played at Dick Howser Stadium in Tallahassee, Florida, against the Florida State Seminoles. Oklahoma was the #7 national seed.

=== NCAA tournament: Tallahassee Super Regional ===
Arkansas and Florida State met previously in the 2004 Fayetteville Super Regional, with the Hogs emerging victorious.

Arkansas took Game 1 from the Seminoles thanks to a three-run seventh and two-run eighth inning. The game took over nine hours real-time to complete due to multiple rain delays. Arkansas center fielder Brett Eibner was featured on SportsCenter's Top 10 plays for a catch he made in the third inning.

Arkansas entered Game 2 with Brett Eibner on the mound and Florida State one loss away from elimination. Second baseman Bo Bigham gave the Hogs a 6–5 lead in the seventh inning of Game 2, but senior platoon outfielder Andrew Darr gave the Hogs the biggest hit of the game in the bottom of the ninth when he hit a two-run double off the wall. The two runs batted in gave the Hogs a 9–8 lead they would not relinquish, giving the Razorbacks their first College World Series appearance since 2004.

== College World Series ==
Arkansas became the first team to punch its ticket to Omaha. The Razorbacks played the Cal State Fullerton Titans, winners of the Fullerton Super Regional first. LSU beat Arkansas on June 15 after defeating Virginia. Arkansas next played the Cavaliers in a College World Series classic, a twelve-inning affair that resulted in Virginia's elimination.

=== Game 1: Cal State Fullerton ===
The Razorbacks had met the Titans three times previous to this, twice in the 1979 College World Series. The Razorbacks dropped all three contests.

Arkansas began the scoring on a Zack Cox single, scoring Chase Leavitt and Ben Tschepikow. Cox would hit a two-run home run in the subsequent inning, making it a 4–0 Arkansas advantage. Fullerton would respond with two runs, but a spectacular play by Bo Bigham would be the highlight of the inning. Scott Lyons hit a two-run single in the fifth inning to make it a 6–2 Hog lead, followed by a three-run home run by Andy Wilkins. The final would be a 10–6 Razorbacks win, with Dallas Keuchel earning the win by pitching six innings and Mike Bolsinger earning the three-inning save.

=== Game 6: L. S. U. ===
Arkansas and LSU had met previously this season, with the Bayou Bengals taking two of three games.

The Razorbacks bats could not touch Louis Coleman, but LSU got to Hog starter Brett Eibner. Mikie Mahtook gave the Tigers a 3–0 lead in the first with a home run to left field, followed by an Andy Wilkins sacrifice fly. Ryan Schimpf doubled to score DJ LeMahieu in the fourth, giving the Tigers a 4–1 lead. A five-run sixth inning gave LSU the final margin of 9-1.

=== Game 9: Virginia ===
Arkansas and Virginia played on June 17 in an elimination game. The Cavaliers took a two-run lead in the fifth inning off Razorbacks pitcher Drew Smyly. Arkansas was down to their final strike in the top of the ninth inning when Brett Eibner homered to tie the game at three. The game would remain scoreless until the twelfth inning, when Andrew Darr doubled to score Jarrod McKinney. Dallas Keuchel, the Game 1 starter, would close out the game from the tenth inning to keep the Hogs' hopes alive.

=== Game 11: L. S. U. ===
Arkansas used eight pitchers, including closer Stephen Richards starting the game in an effort to keep their Omaha hopes alive. LSU jumped out to a 1–0 lead in the top of the first inning when Micah Gibbs scored Blake Dean. The Tigers would push the advantage to 4–0 in the third inning, which included an error and a wild pitch by the Razorbacks. LSU hit solo home runs in the fifth and sixth innings, making the score 6-0. The seventh inning would produce five LSU runs, with the Hogs using four pitchers to record three outs. Arkansas center fielder Brett Eibner hit a two-run home run, scoring Jacob House to make the score 11-2, but the Tigers would get those two runs back in the bottom of the seventh. Chase Leavitt hit a three-run home run in the bottom of the ninth, scoring Thomas Hauskey and Andrew Darr, but the game ended a 15–4 final. Arkansas was eliminated from the College World Series tied for third place with the Arizona State Sun Devils.

== Awards and honors ==
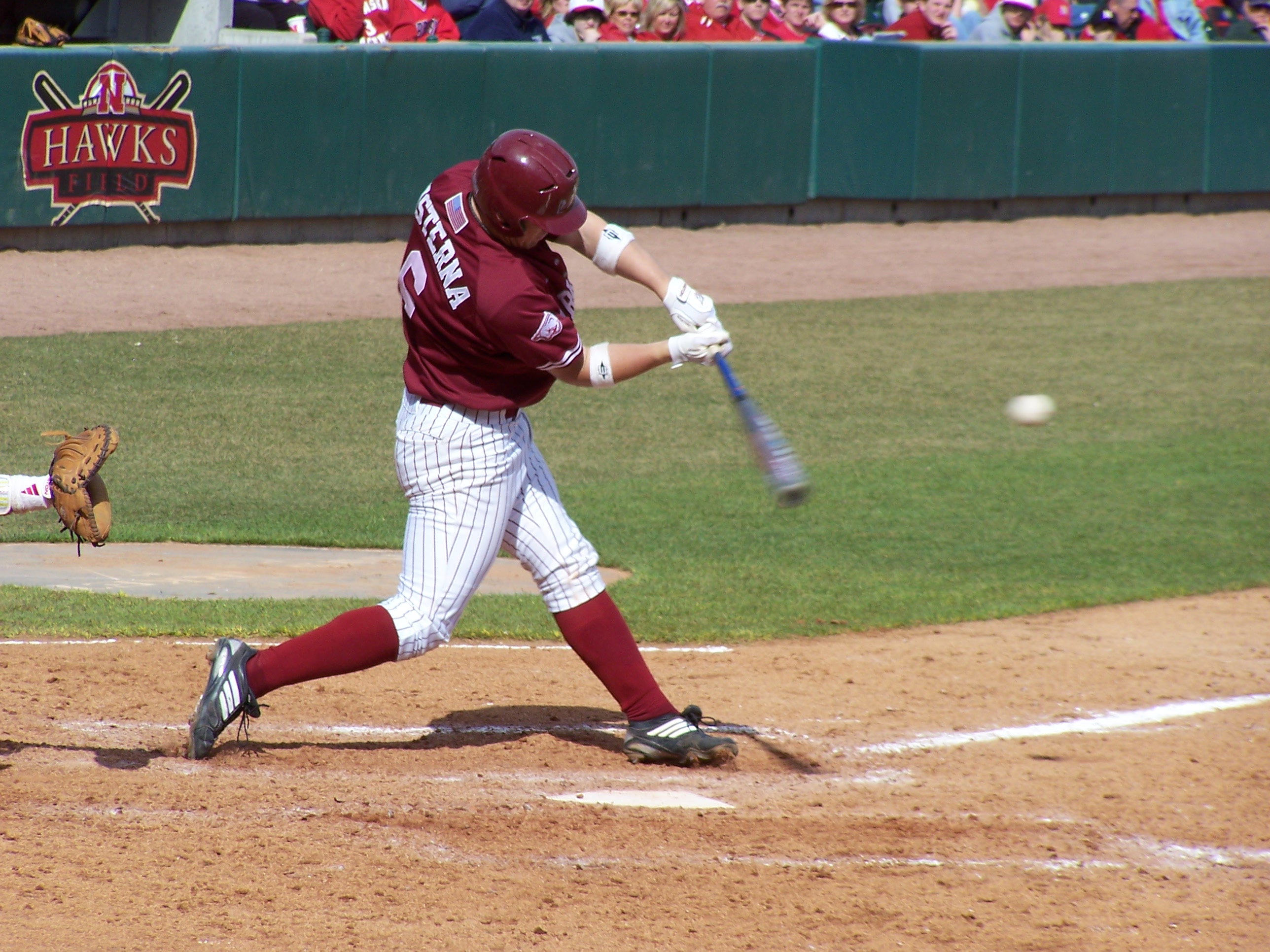
Senior Ryan Cisterna hits a home run last year.

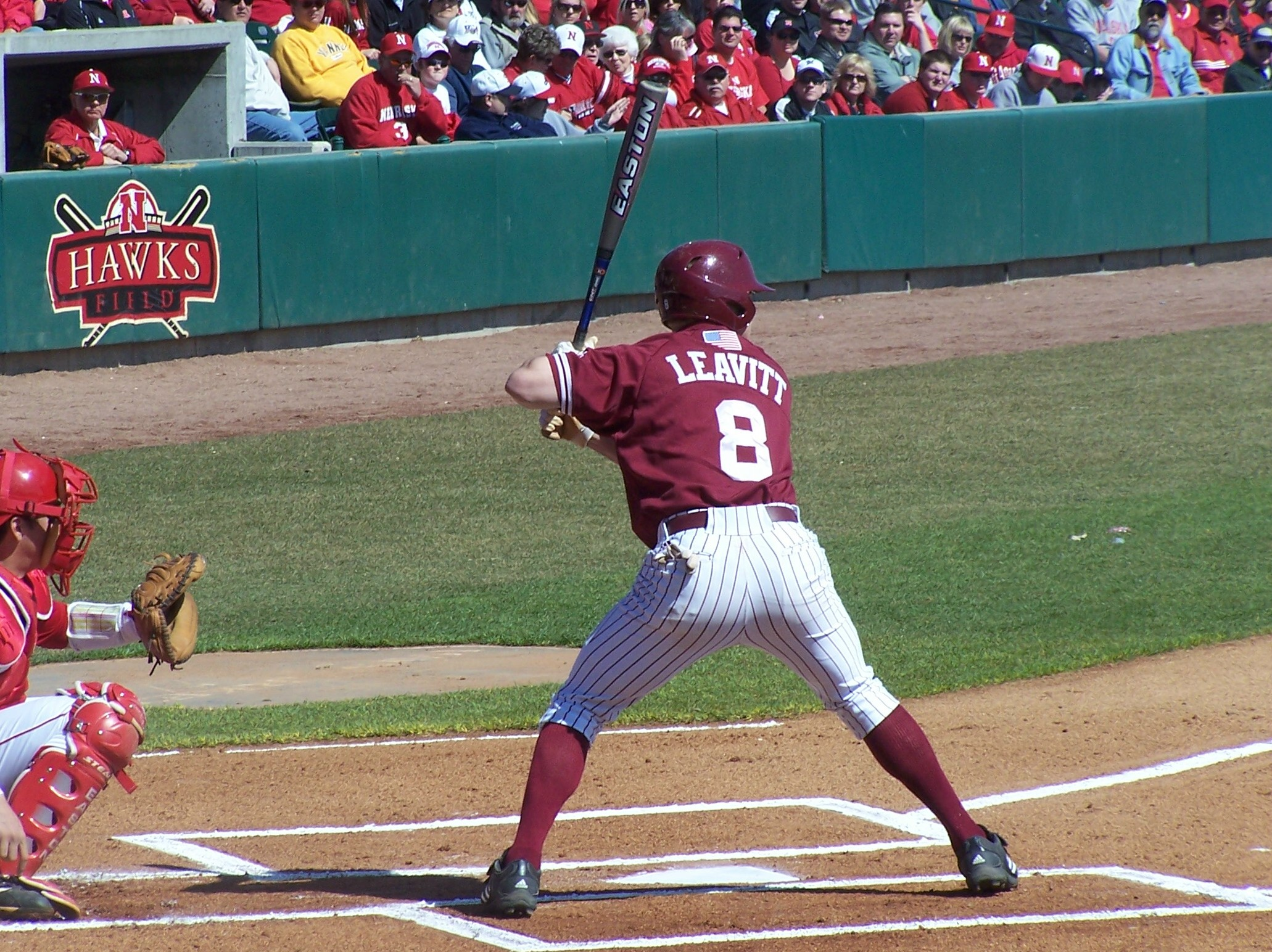
Chase Leavitt at the plate in 2008 against Nebraska.

- Ryan Cisterna

Coleman Company-Johnny Bench Award delivered by Papa John’s Watch List

- Zack Cox

#4 MLB prospect to attend college - Baseball America
#4 SEC newcomer - Baseball America
#5 freshmen prospect - Baseball America
Top Ten impact Freshmen - Rivals.com

- Brett Eibner

Freshman All-American, First team - Baseball America
#5 SEC prospect - Baseball America
#28 sophomore prospect - Baseball America
Louisville Slugger National Player of the Week, April 12–19
SEC Pitcher of the Week, April 12–19
College Baseball Foundation's All-Star Lineup, April 12–19
College Baseball Insider's Southeast Region Player of the Week, April 12–19

- Collin Kuhn

SEC Freshman of the Week - March 8–15

- Chase Leavitt

SEC Player of the Week - March 1–8
Preseason All-SEC - Rivals.com
Co-Captain
College Baseball Foundation's All-Star Lineup, March 1–8

- Ben Tschepikow

Co-Captain

- Andy Wilkins

Norman Regional Most Outstanding Player

== Rankings ==
Ranking movement
Poll	Pre- season	Feb. 23	Mar. 2	Mar. 9	Mar. 16	Mar. 23	Mar. 30	April 6	April 13	April 20	April 27	May 4	May 11	May 18	May 25	June 2	June 9	Final
USA Today/ESPN Coaches' Poll (Top 25)	NR	NR	NR	20	15	10	8	9	12	9	8	11	17	23	23	-	-	-
Baseball America (25)	22	21	21	18	16	14	13	12	11	12	12	17	NR	NR	NR	16	8	7
Collegiate Baseball (30)	NR	NR	NR	NR	23	9	4	1*	5	7	7	13	16	NR	NR	16	7	4
NCBWA (35)	NR	29	26	24	20	16	13	12	12	13	12	11	17	20	21	16	7	7
Rivals.com (25)	NR	25	25	21	16	9	8	7	7	10	9	13	19	NR	-	-	-	-
NR = Not ranked * = First ever #1 ranking

== Razorbacks in the 2009 MLB draft ==
Player	Position	Round	Overall	MLB team
Dallas Keuchel	LHP	7	221	Houston Astros
Stephen Richards	LHP	8	221	Florida Marlins
Scott Lyons	SS	15	452	Kansas City Royals
Ben Tschepikow	2B	17	512	Kansas City Royals
Mike Bolsinger	RHP	33	993	Oakland Athletics
Ryan Cisterna	C	34	1,041	Los Angeles Angels of Anaheim
