= 2009 Florida Gators baseball team =

American college baseball season

2009 Florida Gators baseball

SEC Eastern Division champions Gainesville Regional champions

Gainesville Super Regional, 0–2
- Conference: Southeastern Conference

Ranking
- Coaches: No. 13
- CB: No. 13
- Record: 42–22 (19–11 SEC)
- Head coach: Kevin O'Sullivan (2nd year)
- Assistant coach: Craig Bell (2nd year); Brad Weitzel (2nd year)
- Home stadium: Alfred A. McKethan Stadium

2009 Southeastern Conference baseball standings
	Conf.				Overall
Team	W		L	PCT	W		L	PCT
Eastern
No. 12 Florida ^{x}‍‍‍^{y}	19	–	11	.633	42	–	22	.656
No. 25 South Carolina ‍‍‍^{y}	17	–	13	.567	40	–	23	.635
Georgia ‍‍‍^{y}	15	–	13	.536	38	–	24	.613
Vanderbilt ‍‍‍^{y}	12	–	17	.414	37	–	27	.578
Kentucky ‍‍‍	12	–	18	.400	28	–	26	.519
Tennessee ‍‍‍	11	–	19	.367	26	–	29	.473
Western
No. 1 LSU ^{x}‍†‍‡‍^{y}	20	–	10	.667	56	–	17	.767
No. 13 Ole Miss ^{x}‍‍‍^{y}	20	–	10	.667	44	–	20	.688
Alabama ‍‍‍^{y}	18	–	11	.621	37	–	21	.638
No. 7 Arkansas ‍‍‍^{y}	14	–	15	.483	34	–	22	.607
Auburn ‍‍‍	11	–	19	.367	31	–	25	.554
Mississippi State ‍‍‍	9	–	20	.310	25	–	29	.463
x – Division champion † – Conference champion ‡ – Tournament champion y – Invited to the NCAA tournament Rankings from Baseball America

The 2009 Florida Gators baseball team represented the University of Florida in the sport of baseball during the 2009 college baseball season. The Gators competed in Division I of the National Collegiate Athletic Association (NCAA) and the Eastern Division of the Southeastern Conference (SEC). They played their home games at Alfred A. McKethan Stadium, on the university's Gainesville, Florida campus. The team was coached by Kevin O'Sullivan, who was in his second season at Florida.

== Roster ==
2009 Florida Gators baseball team
Players
Coaches

#	Pos.	Name	B/T	Height	Weight	Year	Home town
2	INF	Josh Adams	R/R	5 ft 10 in (1.78 m)	200 lb (91 kg)	So	Jacksonville, FL
28	RHP	Jeff Barfield	R/R	6 ft 0 in (1.83 m)	215 lb (98 kg)	Jr	Perry, GA
1	OF	Avery Barnes	L/R	5 ft 11 in (1.8 m)	175 lb (79 kg)	Sr	High Springs, FL
44	RHP	Billy Bullock	R/R	6 ft 6 in (1.98 m)	225 lb (102 kg)	Jr	Balm, FL
35	LHP	Kevin Chapman	L/L	6 ft 4 in (1.93 m)	210 lb (95 kg)	So	Coral Springs, FL
11	OF	Riley Cooper	R/R	6 ft 3 in (1.91 m)	215 lb (98 kg)	So	Clearwater, FL
20	LHP	Tony Davis	S/L	5 ft 9 in (1.75 m)	185 lb (84 kg)	Jr	Cooper City, FL
17	LHP	Matt den Dekker	L/L	6 ft 1 in (1.85 m)	205 lb (93 kg)	Jr	Fort Lauderdale, FL
16	RHP	Anthony DeSclafani	R/R	6 ft 2 in (1.88 m)	180 lb (82 kg)	Fr	Freehold, NJ
50	C	Teddy Foster	R/R	6 ft 3 in (1.91 m)	240 lb (109 kg)	Sr	Jacksonville, FL
49	RHP	Clint Franklin	R/R	6 ft 3 in (1.91 m)	200 lb (91 kg)	Jr	Orlando, FL
31	RHP	Will Jolin	R/R	6 ft 2 in (1.88 m)	205 lb (93 kg)	Fr	Guilford, CT
27	RHP	Patrick Keating	R/R	6 ft 2 in (1.88 m)	215 lb (98 kg)	Sr	Harrisburg, IL
37	RHP	Greg Larson	R/R	6 ft 8 in (2.03 m)	215 lb (98 kg)	Fr	Longwood, FL
6	LHP	Stephen Locke	R/L	6 ft 2 in (1.88 m)	190 lb (86 kg)	Sr	Tampa, FL
26	LHP	Nick Maronde	S/L	6 ft 3 in (1.91 m)	195 lb (88 kg)	Fr	Lexington, KY
3	INF	Brandon McArthur	R/R	6 ft 1 in (1.85 m)	200 lb (91 kg)	Sr	Seffner, FL
15	C	Ben McMahan	R/R	6 ft 0 in (1.83 m)	205 lb (93 kg)	Fr	Windermere, FL
5	INF	Mike Mooney	S/R	5 ft 8 in (1.73 m)	160 lb (73 kg)	Jr	Loxahatchee, FL
4	C	Buddy Munroe	R/R	5 ft 11 in (1.8 m)	185 lb (84 kg)	Jr	Miami, FL
24	LHP	Alex Panteliodis	L/L	6 ft 2 in (1.88 m)	240 lb (109 kg)	Fr	Tampa, FL
8	OF	Daniel Pigott	R/R	6 ft 2 in (1.88 m)	195 lb (88 kg)	Fr	Ormond Beach, FL
9	OF	Jonathan Pigott	R/R	6 ft 2 in (1.88 m)	195 lb (88 kg)	Jr	Ormond Beach, FL
7	INF	Clayton Pisani	R/R	6 ft 1 in (1.85 m)	200 lb (91 kg)	Jr	Naples, FL
21	RHP	Justin Poovey	R/R	6 ft 0 in (1.83 m)	195 lb (88 kg)	Fr	Granite Falls, NC
14	LHP	Lee Reumann	L/L	6 ft 0 in (1.83 m)	185 lb (84 kg)	Fr	Wellington, FL
32	INF	Jandy Rosabal	R/R	5 ft 10 in (1.78 m)	165 lb (75 kg)	Jr	Miami, FL
23	RHP	Chas Spottswood	R/R	6 ft 4 in (1.93 m)	205 lb (93 kg)	Jr	Key West, FL
18	OF	Tyler Thompson	L/L	6 ft 1 in (1.85 m)	180 lb (82 kg)	Fr	Tequesta, FL
22	C	Hampton Tignor	R/R	6 ft 1 in (1.85 m)	205 lb (93 kg)	Jr	Sarasota, FL
13	RHP	Tommy Toledo	R/R	6 ft 3 in (1.91 m)	185 lb (84 kg)	So	Tampa, FL
25	INF	Preston Tucker	L/L	6 ft 0 in (1.83 m)	205 lb (93 kg)	Fr	Tampa, FL
12	INF	Jerico Weitzel	L/R	5 ft 11 in (1.8 m)	190 lb (86 kg)	Fr	Ridgway, PA

Head coach

7 Kevin O'Sullivan

Assistant coach(es)

33 Craig Bell
42 Brad Weitzel

Legend

- (C) Team captain
- (S) Suspended
- (I) Ineligible
- Injured
- Current redshirt

Roster

== Schedule ==
2009 Florida Gators baseball game log
Regular season
February

Date	Opponent	Rank	Stadium Site	Score	Win	Loss	Save	Attendance	Overall Record	SEC Record
February 20	No. 8 Louisville	No. 25	McKethan Stadium	6–3	Keating (1–0)	Marks (0–1)	Bullock (1)	4,403	1–0	–
February 21	No. 8 Louisville	No. 25	McKethan Stadium	10–4	Panteliodis (1–0)	Kiekhefer (0–1)	None	3,483	2–0	–
February 22	No. 8 Louisville	No. 25	McKethan Stadium	3–2	Barfield (1–0)	Royse (0–1)	None	3,094	3–0	–
February 24	Eastern Michigan	No. 12	McKethan Stadium	12–0	Poovey (1–0)	Glover (0–1)	None	2,163	4–0	–
February 25	Eastern Michigan	No. 12	McKethan Stadium	17–6	Chapman (1–0)	Combs (0–2)	None	2,143	5–0	–
February 27	No. 14 Miami (FL); Rivalry	No. 12	McKethan Stadium	5–8	Hernandez (2–0)	Keating (1–1)	Bellamy (2)	4,714	5–1	–
February 28	No. 14 Miami (FL); Rivalry	No. 12	McKethan Stadium	1–2	Gutierrez (1–0)	Panteliodis (1–1)	Bellamy (3)	4,570	5–2	–

March

Date	Opponent	Rank	Stadium Site	Score	Win	Loss	Save	Attendance	Overall Record	SEC Record
March 1	No. 14 Miami (FL); Rivalry	No. 12	McKethan Stadium	2–16	Nazario (2–0)	Maronde (0–1)	None	3,038	5–3	–
March 3	at Stetson	No. 20	Melching Field; DeLand, FL	5–2	Barfield (2–0)	Mauldin (0–1)	Bullock (2)	1,928	6–3	–
March 4	Florida Atlantic	No. 20	McKethan Stadium	6–7	Schmitt (3–0)	Keating (1–2)	Adams (3)	2,340	6–4	–
March 6	Duquesne	No. 20	McKethan Stadium	10–5	Panteliodis (2–1)	Pierpont (0–3)	None	2,351	7–4	–
March 7	Duquesne	No. 20	McKethan Stadium	5–3	Maronde (1–1)	Juran (0–3)	Barfield (1)	2,487	8–4	–
March 8	Duquesne	No. 20	McKethan Stadium	12–2	Keating (2–2)	Elms (0–1)	None	2,493	9–4	–
March 13	at Arkansas	No. 19	Baum Stadium; Fayetteville, AR	4–11	Keuchel (2–0)	Bullock (0–1)	None	6,511	9–5	0–1
March 14	at Arkansas	No. 19	Baum Stadium	4–8	Forrest (1–1)	Panteliodis (2–2)	None	6,840	9–6	0–2
March 15	at Arkansas	No. 19	Baum Stadium	2–4	Cox (2–0)	Keating (2–3)	Richards (2)	7,411	9–7	0–3
March 17	Florida State; Rivalry		McKethan Stadium	5–4	Davis (1–0)	Marshall (1–1)	None	3,369	10–7	–
March 18	at UCF		Jay Bergman Field; Orlando, FL	7–3	DeSclafani (1–0)	Brown (0–3)	None	2,758	11–7	–
March 20	Tennessee		McKethan Stadium	3–2	Davis (2–0)	Hernandez (1–2)	Bullock (3)	2,773	12–7	1–3
March 21	Tennessee		McKethan Stadium	10–2	Franklin (1–0)	McCray (3–1)	None	2,929	13–7	2–3
March 22	Tennessee		McKethan Stadium	7–5	Larson (1–0)	Tullo (1–2)	None	2,859	14–7	3–3
March 24	at North Florida	No. 23	Harmon Stadium; Jacksonville, FL	0–3	Jones (1–0)	Larson (1–1)	None	3,194	14–8	–
March 25	North Florida	No. 23	McKethan Stadium	5–3	Poovey (2–0)	Collier (0–2)	Bullock (4)	2,363	15–8	–
March 27	Alabama	No. 23	McKethan Stadium	11–4	Franklin (2–0)	Hyatt (4–1)	Bullock (5)	2,357	16–8	4–3
March 28	Alabama	No. 23	McKethan Stadium	9–8	Larson (2–1)	Nelson (1–3)	None	3,173	17–8	5–3
March 29	Alabama	No. 23	McKethan Stadium	10–7	DeSclafani (2–0)	Howell (2–1)	Bullock (6)	2,803	18–8	6–3
March 31	vs. Florida State; Rivalry	No. 19	Baseball Grounds; Jacksonville, FL	2–3^{5}	Gast (3–2)	Panteliodis (2–3)	Gilmartin (1)	6,251	18–9	–

April

Date	Opponent	Rank	Stadium Site	Score	Win	Loss	Save	Attendance	Overall Record	SEC Record
April 3	at Vanderbilt	No. 19	Hawkins Field; Nashville, TN	8–4	Davis (3–0)	Minor (2–3)	None	2,672	19–9	7–3
April 4	at Vanderbilt	No. 19	Hawkins Field	3–4	Cotham (4–3)	DeSclafani (2–1)	Gray (4)	3,700	19–10	7–4
April 5	at Vanderbilt	No. 19	Hawkins Field	9–16	Gray (2–0)	Bullock (0–2)	None	2,256	19–11	7–5
April 7	Bethune–Cookman	No. 22	McKethan Stadium	12–7	Davis (4–0)	Rodriguez (0–1)	None	2,247	20–11	–
April 8	UCF	No. 22	McKethan Stadium	16–3	DeSclafani (3–1)	Weech (3–1)	None	2,630	21–11	–
April 10	at Auburn	No. 22	Plainsman Park; Auburn, AL	7–8^{11}	Hendrix (6–2)	Panteliodis (2–4)	None	2,082	21–12	7–6
April 11	at Auburn	No. 22	Plainsman Park	24–2	Locke (1–0)	Jacobs (3–2)	None	2,531	22–12	8–6
April 12	at Auburn	No. 22	Plainsman Park	5–1	DeSclafani (4–1)	Thompson (2–2)	Panteliodis (1)	1,850	23–12	9–6
April 14	at No. 22 Florida State; Rivalry	No. 20	Dick Howser Stadium; Tallahassee, FL	10–2	Larson (3–1)	O'Dell (3–2)	None	6,345	24–12	–
April 15	Stetson	No. 20	McKethan Stadium	15–4	Panteliodis (3–4)	Burns (2–4)	None	2,390	25–12	–
April 17	No. 19 Ole Miss	No. 20	McKethan Stadium	2–6	Pomeranz (4–1)	Barfield (2–1)	None	3,563	25–13	9–7
April 18	No. 19 Ole Miss	No. 20	McKethan Stadium	8–4	Locke (2–0)	Irwin (5–3)	None	5,103	26–13	10–7
April 19	No. 19 Ole Miss	No. 20	McKethan Stadium	3–5^{8}	Bittle (4–2)	Panteliodis (3–5)	Morgan (5)	2,839	26–14	10–8
April 21	vs. Florida Gulf Coast	No. 22	Hammond Stadium; Fort Myers, FL	12–3	Bullock (1–2)	Crumbly (3–3)	None	5,147	27–14	–
April 22	South Florida	No. 22	McKethan Stadium	5–4^{10}	Maronde (2–1)	Cole (1–2)	None	2,450	28–14	–
April 24	South Carolina	No. 22	McKethan Stadium	9–4	Locke (3–0)	Dyson (6–3)	None	2,473	29–14	11–8
April 25	South Carolina	No. 22	McKethan Stadium	8–3	Davis (5–0)	Belcher (2–3)	Bullock (7)	2,784	30–14	12–8
April 26	South Carolina	No. 22	McKethan Stadium	9–5	Panteliodis (4–5)	Cooper (5–4)	Bullock (8)	2,743	31–14	13–8

May

Date	Opponent	Rank	Stadium Site	Score	Win	Loss	Save	Attendance	Overall Record	SEC Record
May 1	at No. 6 Georgia	No. 17	Foley Field; Athens, GA	10-9^{11}	Bullock (2–2)	Weaver (1–2)	None	3,579	32–14	14–8
May 2	at No. 6 Georgia	No. 17	Foley Field	7–6	DeSclafani (5–1)	McRee (4–1)	Bullock (9)	3,373	33–14	15–8
May 3	at No. 6 Georgia	No. 17	Foley Field	10–8	Keating (3–3)	Tanner (3–1)	Bullock (10)	3,173	34–14	16–8
May 6	Florida Gulf Coast	No. 9	McKethan Stadium	5–17	Barnes (1–1)	Poovey (2–1)	None	2,650	34–15	–
May 8	at No. 3 LSU	No. 9	Alex Box Stadium; Baton Rouge, LA	1–10	Ranaudo (6–3)	Locke (3–1)	None	10,203	34–16	16–9
May 9	at No. 3 LSU	No. 9	Alex Box Stadium	0–4	Coleman (10–2)	DeSclafani (5–2)	None	10,923	34–17	16–10
May 10	at No. 3 LSU	No. 9	Alex Box Stadium	9–3	Maronde (3–1)	Ross (5–6)	None	9,578	35–17	17–10
May 12	Jacksonville	#11	McKethan Stadium	7–4	Panteliodis (5–5)	Dunlap (1–1)	Bullock (11)	2,294	36–17	–
May 14	Kentucky	No. 11	McKethan Stadium	10–3	Locke (4–1)	Paxton (5–3)	None	2,312	37–17	18–10
May 15	Kentucky	No. 11	McKethan Stadium	7–8	Rusin (7–4)	DeSclafani (5–3)	Darnell (3)	3,121	37–18	18–11
May 16	Kentucky	No. 11	McKethan Stadium	13–9	Panteliodis (6–5)	Darnell (5–6)	None	2,965	38–18	19–11

Postseason
SEC Tournament

Date	Opponent	Rank	Stadium Site	Score	Win	Loss	Save	Attendance	Overall Record	SECT Record
May 20	vs. Arkansas	No. 9	Regions Park; Hoover, AL	5–8	Bolsinger (4–4)	Locke (4–2)	Richards (9)	5,121	38–19	0–1
May 21	vs. No. 8 Ole Miss	No. 9	Regions Park	12–2^{8}	DeSclafani (6–3)	Bukvich (9–3)	None	6,524	39–19	1–1
May 22	vs. Arkansas	No. 9	Regions Park	7–10	Murphy (3–1)	Larson (3–2)	Cox (1)	7,243	39–20	1–2

NCAA tournament: Gainesville Regional

Date	Opponent	Rank	Stadium Site	Score	Win	Loss	Save	Attendance	Overall Record	Regional Record
May 29	Bethune–Cookman	No. 10	McKethan Stadium	8–7	Bullock (3–2)	Thomas (7–6)	None	2,440	40–20	1–0
May 30	No. 18 Miami (FL); Rivalry	No. 10	McKethan Stadium	8–2	Locke (5–2)	Hernandez (7–5)	None	4,109	41–20	2–0
May 31	No. 18 Miami (FL); Rivalry	No. 10	McKethan Stadium	16–5	Keating (4–3)	Nazario (6–5)	None	2,351	42–20	3–0

NCAA tournament: Gainesville Super Regional

Date	Opponent	Rank	Stadium Site	Score	Win	Loss	Save	Attendance	Overall Record	Super Reg. Record
June 6	No. 17 Southern Miss	No. 9	McKethan Stadium	7–9	Johnston (1–0)	Keating (4–4)	Cargill (12)	3,570	42–21	0–1
June 7	No. 17 Southern Miss	No. 9	McKethan Stadium	6–7	Copeland (2–5)	Bullock (3–3)	Cargill (13)	4,313	42–22	0–2

Rankings from Collegiate Baseball. All times Eastern. Retrieved from FloridaGators.com

== See also ==
- Florida Gators
- List of Florida Gators baseball players
