= Brett Eibner =

American baseball player (born 1988)

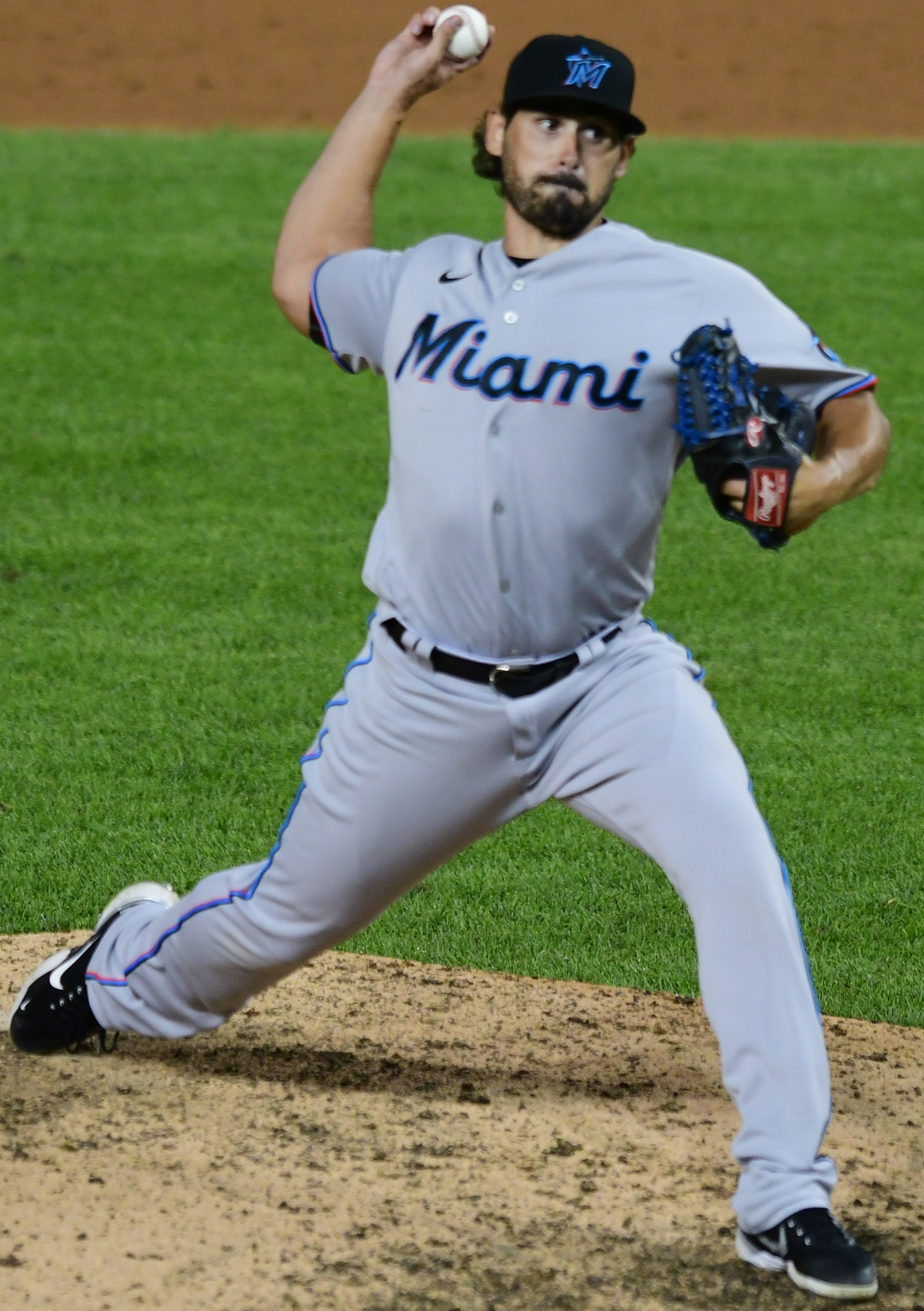
- Eibner pitching for the Miami Marlins in 2020
- Pitcher / Outfielder
- Born: December 2, 1988 (age 37); San Diego, California, U.S.
- Batted: Right Threw: Right

MLB debut
- May 27, 2016, for the Kansas City Royals

Last MLB appearance
- September 22, 2020, for the Miami Marlins

MLB statistics
- Win–loss record: 0-0
- Earned run average: 13.50
- Strikeouts: 4
- Batting average: .191
- Home runs: 8
- Runs batted in: 28
- Stats at Baseball Reference

Teams
- Kansas City Royals (2016); Oakland Athletics (2016); Los Angeles Dodgers (2017); Miami Marlins (2020)
Medals
Men's baseball
Representing United States
WBSC Premier12
Silver medal – second place	2015 Tokyo	Team

Brett William Eibner (born December 2, 1988) is an American former professional baseball pitcher and outfielder. He played in Major League Baseball (MLB) for the Kansas City Royals, Oakland Athletics, Los Angeles Dodgers and Miami Marlins.

== Amateur career ==
Eibner attended The Woodlands High School in The Woodlands, Texas, and helped them win the 2006 5A state championship as a junior, with teammate Kyle Drabek. As a senior, Eibner was named 15-5A first-team all-district outfielder. Despite being drafted by the Houston Astros in the fourth round of the 2007 MLB draft, Eibner did not sign and attended the University of Arkansas.

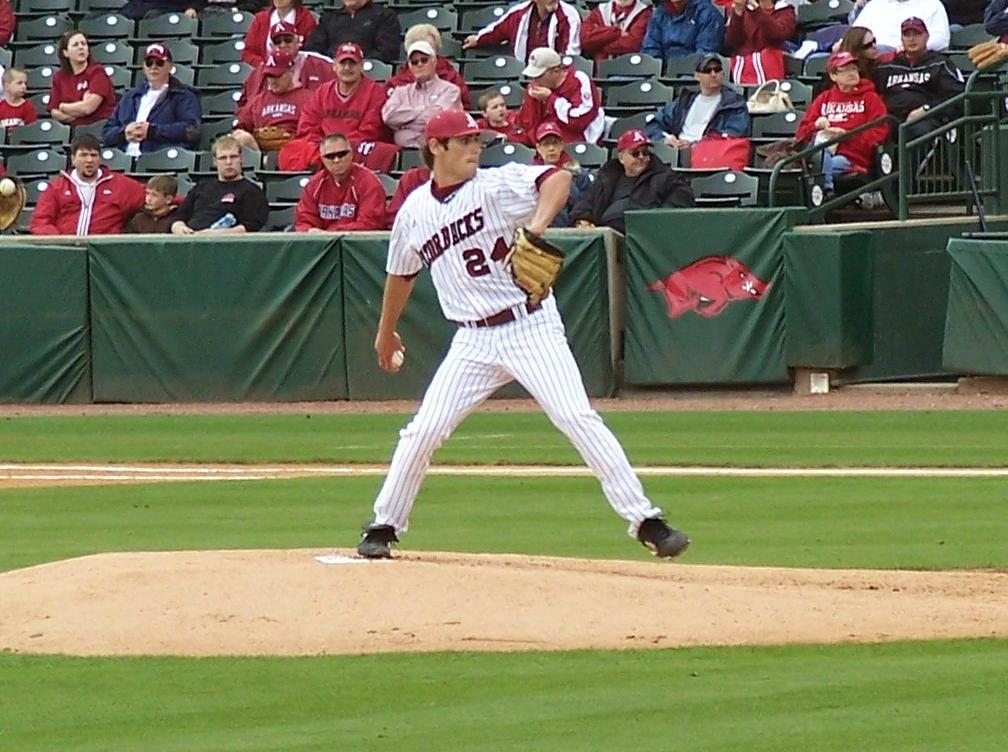
Eibner pitching for the Arkansas Razorbacks in 2009

As a freshman, Eibner led the team in RBI and had three game-winning hits. For his efforts, Eibner was named to Baseball America's Freshman All-American team in 2008. The following season, Eibner was named SEC Pitcher of the Week for his complete-game one-hit shutout win against the #1 Georgia Bulldogs. Eibner struggled significantly at the plate, with his average dropping to .231 and striking out 60 times. However, when the 2009 Arkansas Razorbacks baseball team reached the College World Series, Eibner hit "one of the most memorable home runs in program history" when he tied an elimination game vs Virginia in the top of the ninth with a two-run home run. Eibner returned for his junior season with the Razorbacks, hitting .333 with 22 home runs. On the mound, Eibner went 3–5 in 58 innings for the Razorbacks in the regular season. In the 2010 Tempe, Arizona Super Regional, Eibner hit a game-tying home run with the Razorbacks down to their final strike, extending the game to extra innings where the Razorbacks lost in the 12th. Following the 2010 season, Eibner became the fourth Razorback to be named both a freshman All-American and All-American, including teammate Zack Cox. He was also a John Olerud Award Semifinalist, Second Team All-SEC, and ABCA/Rawlings First Team All-South Region player.

In 2008 and 2009, he played collegiate summer baseball with the Wareham Gatemen of the Cape Cod Baseball League.

== Professional career ==
=== Kansas City Royals ===
The Kansas City Royals selected Eibner in the second round of the 2010 MLB draft.

In 2013, Eibner played for the Northwest Arkansas Naturals of the Double–A Texas League.

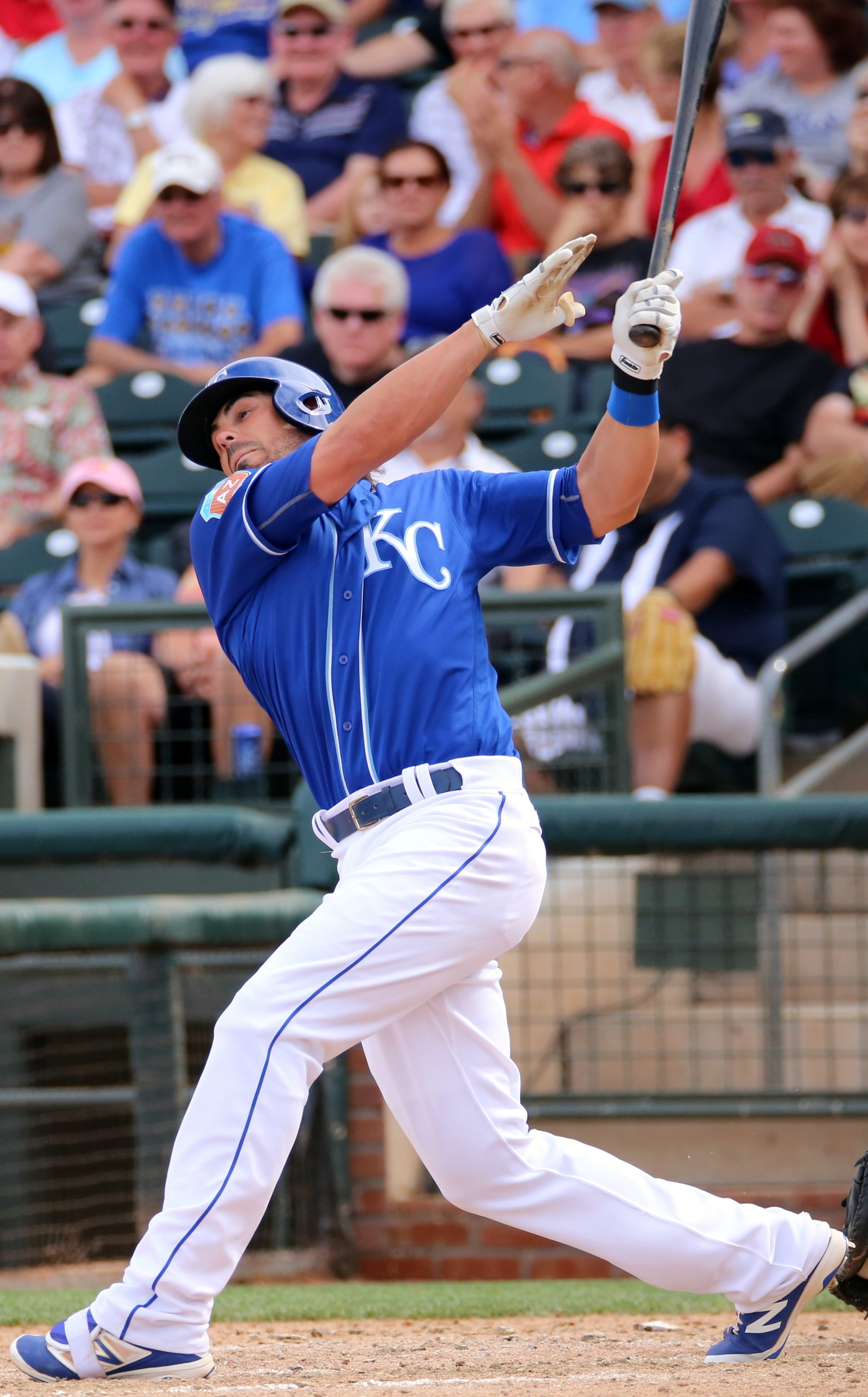
Eibner batting for the Kansas City Royals in 2016 spring training

After the 2015 season, Royals added him to their 40-man roster.

On May 26, 2016, Royals promoted Eibner to MLB. He made his MLB debut the following night at Kansas City's Kauffman Stadium, going 1-for-3 and scoring a run while striking out twice in the Royals' 7–5 win over the Chicago White Sox. Facing off against the White Sox on May 28, 2016, the Royals were trailing 7–1 in the 9th inning, but Eibner completed the rally with a walk-off single to win it for the Royals 8–7.

=== Oakland Athletics ===
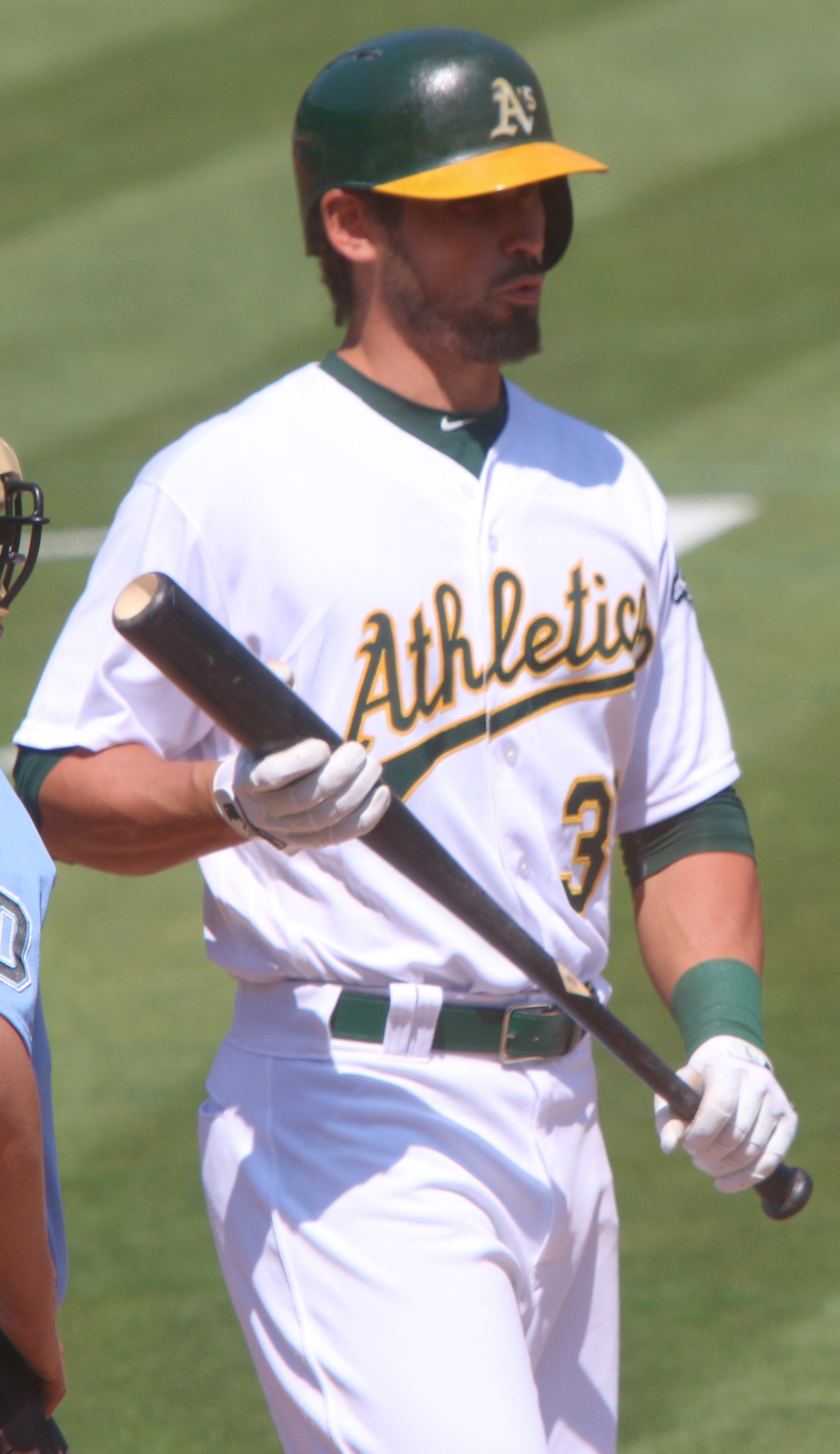
Eibner batting for the Oakland Athletics in 2016

On July 30, 2016, the Royals traded Eibner to the Oakland Athletics for Billy Burns. Eibner was designated for assignment by the Athletics on January 20, 2017.

=== Los Angeles Dodgers ===
On January 25, 2017, Eibner was traded to the Los Angeles Dodgers, in exchange for Jordan Tarsovich and assigned to the Triple-A Oklahoma City Dodgers to begin the season. The Dodgers called him up to MLB on April 19. After playing in 17 games for the Dodgers, he was returned to the minors where the Dodgers attempted to convert him to a pitcher. However, he injured his elbow and underwent Tommy John surgery, ending his season. On September 1, 2017, he was designated for assignment and released the following day.

=== Texas Rangers ===
On December 22, 2017, Eibner signed a minor league contract with the Texas Rangers. He was released on March 19, 2019.

=== Texas AirHogs ===
On June 7, 2019, Eibner signed with the Texas AirHogs of the independent American Association. In 36 games he slashed .167/.310/.319 with 3 home runs and 5 RBIs; he also pitched in 16 games throwing 18 innings with a 1.00 ERA and 27 strikeouts.

=== Sugar Land Skeeters ===
On August 30, 2019, Eibner was traded to the Sugar Land Skeeters of the Atlantic League of Professional Baseball. He became a free agent following the season. He pitched in 8 games throwing 8 innings with a 2.25 ERA and 8 strikeouts.

=== Eastern Reyes del Tigre ===
In July 2020, Eibner signed on to play for the Eastern Reyes del Tigre of the Constellation Energy League (a makeshift 4-team independent league created as a result of the COVID-19 pandemic) for the 2020 season. He pitched in 5 games throwing 5.1 innings with a 0.00 ERA and 8 strikeouts.

=== Miami Marlins ===
On August 2, 2020, the Miami Marlins purchased Eibner's contract. Eibner was selected to the major league roster on August 18 and made his MLB debut as a pitcher that night in the ninth inning against the New York Mets. On August 29, Eibner was designated for assignment by the Marlins. Eibner was re-selected to the active roster on September 21. Eibner was designated for assignment a second time on September 23, after Stephen Tarpley was activated from the injured list.

On April 10, 2021, Eibner re-signed with the Marlins on a minor league contract. He spent the season with the Triple–A Jacksonville Jumbo Shrimp, for whom he made 11 appearances and logged a 3.46 ERA with 14 strikeouts and 3 saves in 13.0 innings of work. Eibner elected free agency following the season on November 7.

On May 1, 2023, Eibner announced his retirement from professional baseball via Instagram.
