= 2009 Kentucky Wildcats baseball team =

2009 season of University of Kentucky baseball team

2009 Kentucky Wildcats baseball
- Conference: Southeastern Conference
- East
- Record: 28–26 (12–18 SEC)
- Head coach: Gary Henderson
- Home stadium: Cliff Hagan Stadium

2009 Southeastern Conference baseball standings
	Conf.				Overall
Team	W		L	PCT	W		L	PCT
Eastern
No. 12 Florida ^{x}‍‍‍^{y}	19	–	11	.633	42	–	22	.656
No. 25 South Carolina ‍‍‍^{y}	17	–	13	.567	40	–	23	.635
Georgia ‍‍‍^{y}	15	–	13	.536	38	–	24	.613
Vanderbilt ‍‍‍^{y}	12	–	17	.414	37	–	27	.578
Kentucky ‍‍‍	12	–	18	.400	28	–	26	.519
Tennessee ‍‍‍	11	–	19	.367	26	–	29	.473
Western
No. 1 LSU ^{x}‍†‍‡‍^{y}	20	–	10	.667	56	–	17	.767
No. 13 Ole Miss ^{x}‍‍‍^{y}	20	–	10	.667	44	–	20	.688
Alabama ‍‍‍^{y}	18	–	11	.621	37	–	21	.638
No. 7 Arkansas ‍‍‍^{y}	14	–	15	.483	34	–	22	.607
Auburn ‍‍‍	11	–	19	.367	31	–	25	.554
Mississippi State ‍‍‍	9	–	20	.310	25	–	29	.463
x – Division champion † – Conference champion ‡ – Tournament champion y – Invited to the NCAA tournament Rankings from Baseball America

The 2009 Kentucky Wildcats baseball team represented the University of Kentucky in the sport of baseball during the 2009 college baseball season. The Wildcats competed in Division I of the National Collegiate Athletic Association (NCAA) and the Eastern Division of the Southeastern Conference (SEC). They played their home games at Cliff Hagan Stadium, on the university's Lexington, Kentucky campus. The team was coached by Gary Henderson, who was in his first season at Kentucky.

== Roster ==
=== Coaches ===
Name	Title	First season at UK	Alma mater
Gary Henderson	Head coach	2003	San Diego State University (1980)
Brad Bohannon	Assistant head coach	2005	Berry College (1998)
Brian Green	Assistant coach	2009	New Mexico State University (1997)
Keith Vorhoff	Volunteer Assistant Coach	2008	Missouri Valley College (2004)

=== Players ===
Number	Players	Position	Year	Hometown (High School)
2	Brian Suedrick	C	Sophomore	Dayton, OH (Wayne)
3	Neiko Johnson	INF	Sophomore	Stone Mountain, GA (Redan)
4	Michael Williams	C	Freshman	Knoxville, TN (Farragut)
5	Chris McClendon	INF	Senior	Lufkin, TX (Lufkin)
6	Spencer Korus	INF/OF	Senior	Olympia, WA (Olympia)
7	Kristi Jim	INF	Sophomore	Lexington, KY (Lexington Christian)
8	Andy Stevens	INF	Freshman	Fort Collins, CO (Rocky Mountain)
9	Tyler Henry	RHP	Junior	Chattanooga, TN (Red Bank)
10	Chris Rusin	LHP	Senior	Canton, MI (Divine Child)
11	Gunner Glad	INF/OF/RHP	Junior	Tahlequah, OK (Tulsa Union)
12	Marcus Nidiffer	C	Junior	Bristol, TN (Tennessee)
13	Bryan Rose	OF	Sophomore	Renssalaer, NY (Columbia)
14	Nick Kennedy	RHP	Junior	Los Angeles (Arcadia)
15	Logan Darnell	LHP	Sophomore	Joelton, TN (Goodpasture)
16	Duran Ferguson	RHP	Sophomore	Kingsport, TN (Dobyns-Bennett)
17	Alex Meyer	RHP	Freshman	Greensburg, IN (Greensburg)
18	Troy Frazier	OF	Junior	Louisville, KY (Pleasure Ridge Park)
19	Sean Bouthilette	RHP	Freshman	Elizabethtown, KY (Elizabethtown)
21	Will Campbell	INF/OF	Junior	Bellevue, WA (Bishop Blanchet)
22	James Paxton	LHP	Junior	Ladner, British Columbia (Delta Secondary School)
23	Mike Kaczmarek	LHP	Sophomore	Tinley Park, IL (Victor J. Andrew)
24	Chad Wright	OF	Freshman	Paducah, KY (Heath)
25	Brock Wright	OF	Junior	Paducah, KY (Heath)
28	Chase Greene	RHP	Freshman	Nicholasville, KY (West Jessamine)
29	Chris Bisson	INF	Sophomore	Ottawa, Ontario (Beatrice-Desloges)
30	Braden Kapteyn	QB/WR	Freshman	Lansing, IL (Illiana Christian)
31	Navarro Hall	OF	Freshman	Kennesaw, GA (Kennesaw Mountain)
34	Clint Tilford	RHP	Junior	Paducah, KY (Heath)
40	Jonathan Huff	RHP	Senior	Amarillo, TX (Canyon Randall)
44	Cory Farris	C/OF	Freshman	Florence, KY (Boone County)
46	Keenan Wiley	OF	Junior	Richmond, KY (Madison Central)
47	TJ Daugherty	C	Freshman	Owensboro, KY (Apollo)

== Schedule/Results ==
2009 Kentucky Wildcats baseball Game Log
Regular Season

#	Date	Opponent	Score	Site/stadium	Win	Loss	Save	Attendance	Overall record	SEC record
1	February 20	Troy	8–3	Myrtle Beach, SC	James Paxton (1–0)	Jason Walls (0–1)	Nick Kennedy (1)	107	1–0	0–0
2	February 21	James Madison	8–3	Myrtle Beach, SC	Sean Bouthilette (1–0)	Alex Valadja (0–1)	None	145	2–0	0–0
3	February 21	#22 Coastal Carolina	1–4	Myrtle Beach, SC	Austin Fleet (1–0)	Clint Tilford (0–1)	Nick McCully (1)	936	2–1	0–0
4	February 22	#22 Coastal Carolina	5–14	Myrtle Beach, SC	Cody Wheeler (1–0)	Chris Rusin (0–1)	None	676	2–2	0–0
5	February 27	Western Michigan	16–5	Cliff Hagan Stadium	James Paxton (2–0)	Morrison (0–2)	Alex Meyer (1)	1539	3–2	0–0
6	March 1	Western Michigan	15–4	Cliff Hagan Stadium	Chris Rusin (1–1)	Stroud (0–2)	Braden Kapteyn (1)	1410	4–2	0–0
7	March 3	Western Michigan	12–6	Cliff Hagan Stadium	Logan Darnell (1–0)	Hall (0–1)	None	1556	5–2	0–0
8	March 4	Eastern Kentucky	9–8	Cliff Hagan Stadium	Braden Kapteyn (1–0)	Chris Hord (0–1)	None	1620	6–2	0–0
9	March 6	Indiana State	12–4	Cliff Hagan Stadium					7–2	0–0
10	March 7	Indiana State	5–0	Cliff Hagan Stadium					8–2	0–0
11	March 8	Indiana State	9–6	Cliff Hagan Stadium					9–2	0–0
12	March 10	Georgetown (KY)	12–5	Cliff Hagan Stadium					10–2	0–0
13	March 11	Indiana	8–7	Cliff Hagan Stadium					11–2	0–0
14	March 13	#3 LSU	3–5	Alex Box Stadium					11–3	0–1
15	March 14	#3 LSU	1–3	Alex Box Stadium					11–4	0–2
16	March 15	#3 LSU	5–2	Alex Box Stadium					12–4	1–2
17	March 16	Nicholls State	Cancelled	Thibodeaux, LA						
19	March 17	New Orleans	5–4	New Orleans, LA					13–4	1–2
20	March 20	Vanderbilt	3–1	Cliff Hagan Stadium					14–4	2–2
21	March 21	Vanderbilt	6–2	Cliff Hagan Stadium					15–4	3–2
22	March 22	Vanderbilt	2–4	Cliff Hagan Stadium					15–5	3–3
23	March 24	West Virginia		Hawley Field						
24	March 25	Cincinnati		Cliff Hagan Stadium						
25	March 27	South Carolina		Cliff Hagan Stadium						
26	March 28	South Carolina		Cliff Hagan Stadium						
27	March 29	South Carolina		Cliff Hagan Stadium						
28	March 31	Marshall		Cliff Hagan Stadium						
29	April 3	Ole Miss		Swayze Field						
30	April 4	Ole Miss		Swayze Field						
31	April 5	Ole Miss		Swayze Field						
32	April 7	Western Kentucky								
33	April 8	Western Kentucky		Cliff Hagan Stadium						
34	April 10	Georgia		Cliff Hagan Stadium						
35	April 11	Georgia		Cliff Hagan Stadium						
36	April 12	Georgia		Cliff Hagan Stadium						
37	April 14	Louisville		Jim Patterson Stadium						
38	April 17	Mississippi State		Dudy Noble Field						
39	April 18	Mississippi State		Dudy Noble Field						
40	April 19	Mississippi State		Dudy Noble Field						
41	April 21	Lipscomb		Cliff Hagan Stadium						
42	April 22	Evansville		Cliff Hagan Stadium						
43	April 24	Alabama		Sewell-Thomas Stadium						
44	April 25	Alabama		Sewell-Thomas Stadium						
45	April 26	Alabama		Sewell-Thomas Stadium						
46	April 28	Louisville		Cliff Hagan Stadium						
47	May 1	Tennessee		Cliff Hagan Stadium						
48	May 2	Tennessee		Cliff Hagan Stadium						
49	May 3	Tennessee		Cliff Hagan Stadium						
50	May 8	Auburn		Cliff Hagan Stadium						
51	May 9	Auburn		Cliff Hagan Stadium						
52	May 10	Auburn		Cliff Hagan Stadium						
53	May 12	Morehead State		Cliff Hagan Stadium						
54	May 14	Florida		Alfred A. McKethan Stadium						
55	May 15	Florida		Alfred A. McKethan Stadium						
56	May 16	Florida		Alfred A. McKethan Stadium						

SEC Tournament

#	Date	Opponent	Score	Site/stadium	Win	Loss	Save	Attendance	Overall record	SECT record
57				Regions Park						

NCAA Tournament: College World Series

#	Date	Opponent	Score	Site/stadium	Win	Loss	Save	Attendance	Overall record	NCAAT record
58	June 13			Rosenblatt Stadium						

== Rankings ==
Ranking movement
Poll	Pre- season	Feb. 25	Mar. 3	Mar. 10	Mar. 17	Mar. 24	Mar. 31	Apr. 7	Apr. 14	Apr. 21	Apr. 28	May 5	May 12	May 19	May 26	June 3	June 10	Final Poll
USA Today/ESPN Coaches' Poll (Top 25)	26																	
Baseball America (Top 25)	NR																	
Collegiate Baseball (Top 30)	19																	
NCBWA (Top 30)^	23																	
Rivals.com (Top 25)	NR																	
NR = Not ranked
