= Baum–Walker Stadium =

Baseball park at University of Arkansas

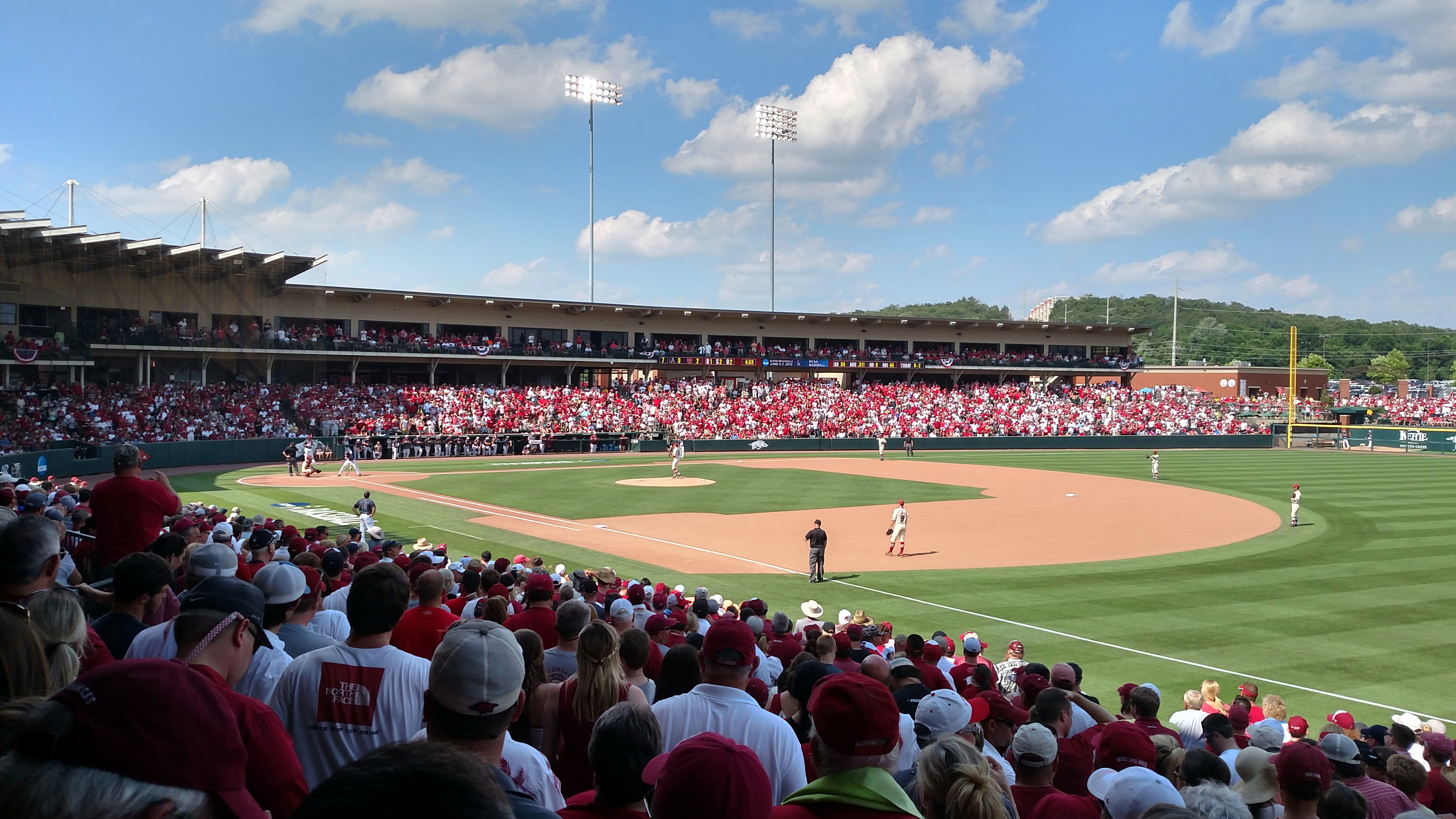
- Interactive map of Baum–Walker Stadium
- Full name: Baum–Walker Stadium at George Cole Field
- Location: 1255 South Razorback Road, Fayetteville, Arkansas 72701
- Coordinates: 36°03′1.13″N 94°10′57.34″W
- Owner: University of Arkansas
- Operator: University of Arkansas
- Capacity: 11,121
- Surface: hybrid bermuda grass (2004–present); Artificial turf (1996–2003)
- Record attendance: 13,472 (March 3, 2018 vs Southern California)
- Field size: Left Field - 320 ft (97.5 m); Left-Center - 375 ft (114.3 m); Center Field - 400 ft (121.9 m); Right-Center - 365 ft (111.3 m); Right Field - 320 ft (97.5 m)

Construction
- Groundbreaking: October 12, 1994
- Opened: April 13, 1996
- Renovated: 2003, 2004, 2006, 2007
- Expanded: 2003, 2006, 2007, 2021
- Cost: $8.9 million
- Architect: Populous
- General contractor: Kinco, Inc

Tenants
- Arkansas Razorbacks baseball (NCAA Division I SEC) (1996–present)

Baum–Walker Stadium at George Cole Field is the home venue of the Arkansas Razorbacks baseball team of the NCAA Division I Southeastern Conference, located in Fayetteville, Arkansas, United States. The playing field itself is named George Cole Field, in honor of the former Arkansas athletic director. George Cole Field was also the name of the Razorbacks' old home stadium, in use from 1975 to March 1996. Baum Stadium replaced George Cole Field in April 1996. The stadium is located one-half mile from the main Arkansas campus, which lies across Razorback Road from the stadium. On January 31, 2019 the stadium was renamed Baum–Walker Stadium at George Cole Field in recognition of longtime support from the Walker Family and the Willard and Pat Walker Charitable Foundation.

== History ==
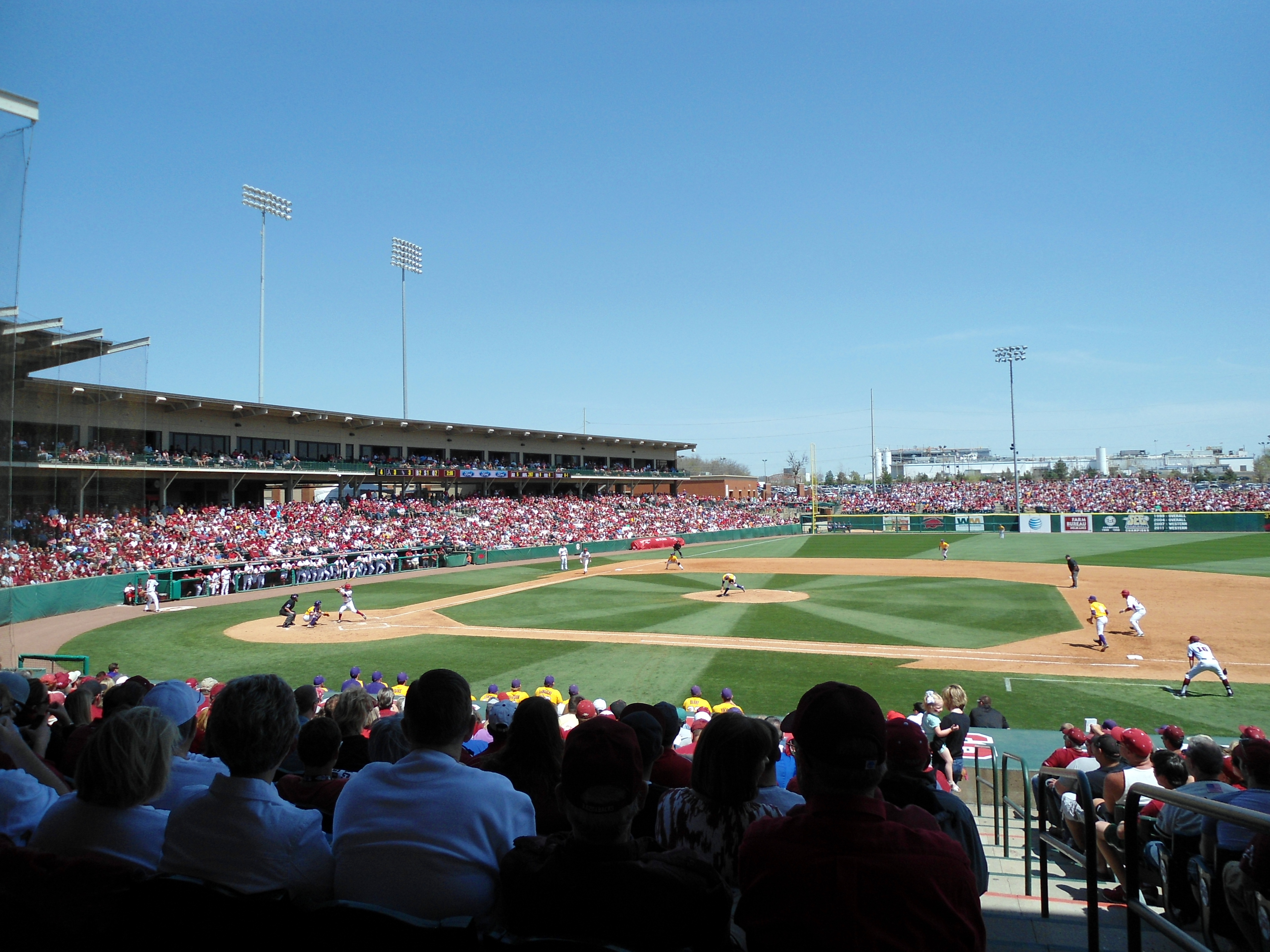
Baum–Walker Stadium, April 2013

Baum Stadium officially opened in 1996. It was designed by Populous (formerly HOK Sport), an architecture firm that has also designed several major league stadiums. Its first game was a 9–2 Arkansas win over Auburn on April 13, 1996. The stadium was dedicated prior to a 9–3 Arkansas win over Alabama on May 3, 1996.

In 1998, Baum Stadium was named the country's number one college baseball facility by Baseball America, and claimed the top spot again in 2018. In 1999, Arkansas won the regular season Southeastern Conference title and had an average home attendance of 3,780 spectators, the sixth-highest total in Division I college baseball. That year, the stadium hosted an NCAA regional.

Prior to the 2003 season, 2,600 chairback seats were added (1,300 down each foul line). In addition, the hitting and pitching cages were enclosed to allow year-round access. During the 2003 and 2004 seasons, renovations took place. Coaches offices and eight luxury boxes were added above the seating areas. Also, a new scoreboard was built in right field. The scoreboard stands 51 feet high and is 76 feet wide and features four classic brick pillars. Also in 2004, a natural grass surface was added, replacing the AstroTurf field that had been in place since the stadium opened. Rye grass was initially used for the 2004 season but was in 2005 replaced by a hybrid bermuda grass. In November 2006, the stadium underwent its third expansion since the 2003 season. The expansion includes 20 luxury boxes, 1,500 chairback seats, and a new outfield area to bring the stadium's capacity to 10,737 spectators. The expansions have made the stadium the second biggest, by listed capacity, in the Southeastern Conference.

Baum Stadium hosted its first #1 vs. #1 matchup ever on April 7, 2009, a 7-3 Razorbacks victory over the Arizona State Sun Devils. The Hogs were #1 in Collegiate Baseball's poll, with ASU pulling a top ranking from Baseball America and the USA Today/ESPN Coaches' Poll. The very next night, the Hogs set a then Baum Stadium record for attendance at 11,044 when they completed the sweep of the Sun Devils.

Before the 2016 season, another new scoreboard was unveiled, becoming the largest video board in collegiate baseball.

== Attendance ==
Rank	Attendance	Opponent	Date	Notes
1	13,472	Southern California	March 3, 2018	
2	12,589	Mississippi State	April 25, 2015	
3	12,167	Missouri State	June 6, 2015	Fayetteville Super Regional
4	12,006	South Alabama	March 7, 2020	
5	11,722	South Carolina	June 9, 2018	Fayetteville Super Regional

During the weekend of May 4, 2007, Baum Stadium set a record attendance mark for a regular season three-game conference series. In the series against LSU, a total of 29,971 spectators attended the three-game series, which LSU won two games to one. The stadium's single-game attendance record of 11,103 spectators was set on April 9, 2011, in an 8–7 Arkansas win over LSU.

In 2019, the Razorbacks finished 2nd in the nation in average attendance, drawing an average of 9,178 fans over 40 home games. The per-game figure, as well as the total attendance of 348,775 were both program records.

== See also ==
- List of NCAA Division I baseball venues
