= 2009 Southeastern Conference baseball tournament =

- Teams: 8
- Format: Double elimination with flipped brackets
- Finals site: Regions Park; Hoover, Alabama
- Champions: LSU (8th title)
- Winning coach: Paul Mainieri (2nd title)
- MVP: Mikie Mahtook (LSU)
- Attendance: 86,048

The 2009 Southeastern Conference baseball tournament was held at Regions Park in Hoover, AL from May 20 through 24. LSU won the tournament and earned the Southeastern Conference's automatic bid to the 2009 NCAA Division I baseball tournament. LSU won the College World Series in Omaha, Nebraska.

== Regular season results ==
The top eight teams (based on conference results) from the conference earned invites to the tournament.

Eastern Division
Team	W	L	T	Pct	GB	Seed
Florida	19	11		.633		2
South Carolina	17	13		.567	2	5
Georgia	15	15		.500	4	6
Vanderbilt	12	17		.414	6.5	8
Kentucky	12	18		.400	7	
Tennessee	11	19		.367	8	

Western Division
Team	W	L	T	Pct	GB	Seed
LSU	20	10		.667		1
Ole Miss	20	10		.667		3
Alabama	18	11		.621	1.5	4
Arkansas	14	15		.483	5.5	7
Auburn	11	19		.367	9	
Miss St.	9	20		.310	10.5	

== Format ==
The 2009 tournament will once again feature a "flipped bracket". This means that after two days of play the undefeated team from each bracket will move into the other bracket. This reduces the number of rematches teams will have to play in order to win the tournament.

== Tournament ==
First round
7	Arkansas	8
2	Florida	5
6	Georgia	6
3	Ole Miss	3
2	Florida	12^
3	Ole Miss	2
8	Vanderbilt	4
1	LSU	1
5	South Carolina	9*
4	Alabama	5
1	LSU	9
4	Alabama	6

Second round
7	Arkansas	1
6	Georgia	2*
7	Arkansas	10
2	Florida	7
8	Vanderbilt	5
5	South Carolina	4
5	South Carolina	1
1	LSU	4

Semifinals
8	Vanderbilt	11	-
7	Arkansas	1	-
6	Georgia	0	2
1	LSU	16	3

Final
1	LSU	6
8	Vanderbilt	2

- * Game went into extra innings.
- ^ Game ended after 8 innings due to Mercy Rule.
- Auburn, Mississippi St., Kentucky and Tennessee did not make the tournament.

== All-Tournament Team ==
Position	Player	School
1B	Preston Tucker	Florida
2B	Bo Bigham	Arkansas
3B	Zack Cox	Arkansas
SS	Austin Nola	LSU
SS	Ben Tschepikow	Arkansas
C	Andrew Giobbi	Vanderbilt
OF	Mikie Mahtook	LSU
OF	Jonathan Pigott	Florida
OF	Steven Liddle	Vanderbilt
DH	Blake Dean	LSU
P	Mike Minor	Vanderbilt
P	Daniel Bradshaw	LSU
MVP	Mikie Mahtook	LSU

== See also ==
- College World Series
- NCAA Division I Baseball Championship
- Southeastern Conference baseball tournament
