= 2009 LSU Tigers baseball team =

NCAA Division I college baseball season

2009 LSU Tigers baseball

SEC Champions SEC Tournament champions National Champions
- Conference: Southeastern Conference
- West
- Record: 56–17 (20–10 SEC)
- Head coach: Paul Mainieri
- Hitting coach: Javi Sanchez
- Pitching coach: David Grewe
- Home stadium: Alex Box Stadium

2009 Southeastern Conference baseball standings
	Conf.				Overall
Team	W		L	PCT	W		L	PCT
Eastern
No. 12 Florida ^{x}‍‍‍^{y}	19	–	11	.633	42	–	22	.656
No. 25 South Carolina ‍‍‍^{y}	17	–	13	.567	40	–	23	.635
Georgia ‍‍‍^{y}	15	–	13	.536	38	–	24	.613
Vanderbilt ‍‍‍^{y}	12	–	17	.414	37	–	27	.578
Kentucky ‍‍‍	12	–	18	.400	28	–	26	.519
Tennessee ‍‍‍	11	–	19	.367	26	–	29	.473
Western
No. 1 LSU ^{x}‍†‍‡‍^{y}	20	–	10	.667	56	–	17	.767
No. 13 Ole Miss ^{x}‍‍‍^{y}	20	–	10	.667	44	–	20	.688
Alabama ‍‍‍^{y}	18	–	11	.621	37	–	21	.638
No. 7 Arkansas ‍‍‍^{y}	14	–	15	.483	34	–	22	.607
Auburn ‍‍‍	11	–	19	.367	31	–	25	.554
Mississippi State ‍‍‍	9	–	20	.310	25	–	29	.463
x – Division champion † – Conference champion ‡ – Tournament champion y – Invited to the NCAA tournament Rankings from Baseball America

The 2009 LSU Tigers baseball team represented Louisiana State University in the NCAA Division I baseball season of 2009. This was the first year for the team in the new Alex Box Stadium.

The 2009 team was coached by Paul Mainieri who was in his third season at LSU. During his first year at LSU, Mainieri's team posted a 29–26–1 record, but failed to make the SEC tournament or the NCAA tournament. The team improved during his second year posting a 49–19–1 record, while claiming the SEC Western Division Title, SEC Tournament championship, and earned the No. 7 National Seed for the 2008 NCAA tournament. They advanced to the 2009 College World Series where they would win the national title, their first since 2000, and 6th overall.

== Previous season ==
Paul Mainieri completed his second season as head coach at LSU in 2008. The Tigers won the SEC West division title which earned them the No. 2 seed in the 2008 SEC baseball tournament. The Tigers would go on to the win the tournament and secure a spot in the NCAA post-season.

After winning the SEC Tournament, it was announced that LSU was selected as a host site for the 2008 NCAA tournament for the 18th time in the history of the program and for the first time since the 2005 season. When the full NCAA tournament bracket was released, LSU was awarded the No. 7 national seed in the tournament, guaranteeing them home field advantage throughout the Super Regionals as long as they won the Regional round. LSU was able to sweep the Baton Rouge regional to secure a spot in the Super Regional round.

UC-Irvine won the Lincoln, NE regional and moved on to the Super Regional to face LSU. After losing the first game, LSU's hopes of a national title were slim going into the 9th inning of game 2. However the Tigers fought back and won the game in comeback fashion by a score of 9–7. LSU wasted no time in game 3 cruising to a 6–0 lead in the 1st inning and eventually winning the game 21–7. The Tigers celebrated the school's 14th trip to the College World Series in what was the last game in the 70-year history of Alex Box Stadium.

LSU faced North Carolina in the first game of the 2008 College World Series. The Tar Heels defeated the Tigers by a score of 8–4, giving LSU its 5th consecutive CWS loss and sending them to the losers bracket. The Tigers faced the Rice Owls next and looked to be headed home with an 0–2 CWS record again after trailing by a score of 5–0, however, in typical Tiger fashion, LSU rallied in the bottom of the 9th inning and won the game on a 3-run double by All-American Blake Dean.

The Tigers then had to face North Carolina again, who had lost to Fresno State. The game started on June 19, 2008, but was delayed by weather and completed on June 20, 2008. The game went into the top of the 9th inning tied 3–3 but a grand slam home run, the first in the College World Series since 2001, gave North Carolina a 7–3 lead. LSU was unable to rally in the bottom of the 9th, and their season was ended.

The 2008 squad compiled and overall record of 49–19–1, which included a 23-game win streak.

== Pre-season ==
=== Coaching changes ===
On June 12, 2008 Terry Rooney was named Head Baseball Coach at the University of Central Florida.

On June 23, 2008, it was announced that Cliff Godwin would join Rooney at Central Florida as an assistant coach.

On June 26, 2008, Paul Mainieri announced the hiring of David Grewe as associate head coach. Grewe previously coached under Mainieri at Notre Dame before leaving in 2005 to become the Head Coach at Michigan State.

It was also announced that Javi Sanchez and Will Davis were promoted. Sanchez was promoted from volunteer assistant to a full-time assistant. He replaced Godwin as the Tigers hitting coach and supervisor of base running. Davis was promoted from Director of Baseball Operations to volunteer assistant.

The final change to Mainieri's staff that was announced on June 26 was the appointment of Kyle Beerbohm. Beerbohm was appointed as an undergraduate student assistant coach, and is a former Tiger pitcher.

On August 20, 2008, it was announced that Ross Brezovsky was hired as the Coordinator of Baseball Operation.

=== 2008 Recruiting Class ===
2008 Recruits

Name	Hometown	School	Height	Weight	Bats	Throws
Ryan Chafee; P	Valparaiso, Fl	Niceville, HS/Chipola College	6–2	195	R	R
Ryan Chafee; P	Drafted: 105th overall in Round 3 by the Angels
William Delatte; INF	St. Amant, LA	St. Amant High School	5–11	211	L	R
Beau Didier; INF	Tacoma, WA	Bellarmine High School	6–2	200	L	R
Beau Didier; INF	Drafted: 1194th overall in Round 40 by the Pirates
Grant Dozar; INF	Morgan City, LA	Morgan City High School	5–10	173	L	R
Tyler Hanover; INF	Kernersville, NC	East Forsyth High School	5–6	163	R	R
Mikie Mahtook; OF	Lafayette, LA	St. Thomas More High School	6–1	195	R	R
Mikie Mahtook; OF	Drafted: 1168th overall in Round 39 by the Marlins
Chris Matulis; P	Boynton Beach, FL	Park Vista High School	6–5	215	L	R
Chris Matulis; P	Drafted: 1397th overall in Round 47 by the Rays
Austin Nola; INF	Baton Rouge, LA	Catholic High School	5–11	192	R	R
Austin Nola; INF	Drafted: 1445th overall in Round 48 by the Rockies
Matty Ott; P	Metarie, LA	Holy Cross High School	6–1	180	R	R
JonMichael Redding; P	Valdosta, GA	Lowndes High School/Florida Community College	6–1	195	R	R
JonMichael Redding; P	Drafted: 157th overall in Round 5 by the Dodgers
Shane Riedie; P	Slidell, LA	Slidell High School	6–5	243	R	R
Randy Ziegler; INF/P	Shreveport, LA	Calvary Baptist High School	6–0	160	L	L

=== Key Losses ===
- Michael Hollander
- Jared Bradford
- Matt Clark

=== Ranked #1 ===
On December 22, 2008, the Collegiate Baseball Newspaper released their NCAA Div. 1 Pre-Season Poll with LSU ranked #1. LSU reached a No. 2 ranking in 2008, but had not been ranked No. 1 in quite some time.

On January 22, 2009, LSU was also ranked No. 1 in the USA Today/ESPN baseball pre-season poll. They narrowly beat out North Carolina for the top spot.

== Roster ==
=== Coaches ===
Name	Title	First Season at LSU	Alma Mater
Paul Mainieri	Head coach	2007	Florida International University (1980)
David Grewe	Associate head coach	2009	University of Dayton (1998)
Javi Sanchez	Assistant coach	2008	University of Notre Dame (2004)
Will Davis	Volunteer Assistant Coach	2008	Louisiana State University (2007)
Kyle Beerbohm	Undergraduate Student Asst. Coach	2009	Louisiana State University (2009)
Ross Brezovsky	Coordinator of Baseball Operations	2009	University of Notre Dame (2008)

=== 2009 Players ===
Pitchers: Ben Alsup; Paul Bertuccini; Daniel Bradshaw; Jordan Brown^; Holden Moles; Nolan Cain; Louis Coleman; Spencer Mathews; Chris Matulis; Jordan Nicholson; Matty Ott; Anthony Ranaudo; Shane Riedie; Austin Ross; Randy Zeigler	Catchers: Kevin Farnsworth; Micah Gibbs; Sean Ochinko	Infielders: Wet Delatte; Beau Didier; Grant Dozar; Tyler Hanover; Buzzy Haydel; Derek Helenihi; DJ LeMahieu; Chris McGhee; Austin Nola; Ryan Schimpf	Outfielders: Blake Dean; Johnny Dishon; Chad Jones; Leon Landry; Mikie Mahtook; Jared Mitchell; Nicholas Pontiff

•Ryan Byrd

- ^ Jordan Brown decided to end his baseball career before the season due to injuries.

== Schedule ==
2009 LSU Tigers baseball Game Log

Regular season

February
#	Date	Opponent	Score	Site/stadium	Win	Loss	Save	Attendance	Overall record	SEC Record
1	February 20	Villanova	12–3	Alex Box Stadium	Coleman (1–0)	Pack (0–1)		9,054	1–0	
2	February 21	Villanova	11–1	Alex Box Stadium	Ranaudo (1–0)	Streilein (0–1)	Bradshaw (1)	6,214	2–0	
3	February 22	Villanova	6–3	Alex Box Stadium	Ross (1–0)	Helisek (0–1)	Bertuccini (1)	5,994	3–0	
4	February 25	Southern	11–5	Alex Box Stadium	Matulis (1–0)	Richard (0–1)		5,828	4–0	
5	February 27	Central Florida	13–4	Alex Box Stadium	Ranaudo (2–0)	Sweat (1–1)		7,419	5–0	
6	February 28	Central Florida	11–2	Alex Box Stadium	Ott (1–0)	Hudson (0–1)	Riedie (1)	5,550	6–0	

March
#	Date	Opponent	Score	Site/stadium	Win	Loss	Save	Attendance	Overall record	SEC record
7	March 1	Central Florida	16–0	Alex Box Stadium	Ross (2–0)	Hicks (0–1)		4,303	7–0	
8	March 3	New Orleans	19–3	Maestri Field	Matulis (2–0)	McGonigle (0–2)	Matthews (1)	2,190	8–0	
9	March 4	Mississippi Valley State	10–4	Alex Box Stadium	Coleman (2–0)	Reid (0–2)		8,650	9–0	
10	March 6	Illinois	1–3	Alex Box Stadium	Corey (1–0)	Coleman (2–1)	Chmielewski (2)	10,246	9–1	
11	March 7	Illinois	22–10	Alex Box Stadium	Nicholson (1–0)	Martin (1–1)		9,910	10–1	
12	March 8	Illinois	2–6	Alex Box Stadium	Reeser (2–0)	Ross (2–1)		9,344	10–2	
13	March 10	Southeastern Louisiana	16–5	Alumni Field	Matulis (3–0)	Herring (0–2)		2,947	11–2	
14	March 11	Louisiana-Lafayette	9–10	Alex Box Stadium	Wagley (1–1)	Ott (1–1)	Wascom (1)	9,883	11–3	
15	March 13	Kentucky	5–3	Alex Box Stadium	Coleman (3–1)	Tilford (1–2)		8,954	12–3	1–0
16	March 15	Kentucky	2–5^{(7)}	Alex Box Stadium	Rusin (3–1)	Ross (2–2)		8,988	12–4	1–1
17	March 15	Kentucky	3–1^{(7)}	Alex Box Stadium	Coleman (4–1)	Meyer (1–1)		9,185	13–4	2–1
18	March 17	Northwestern State	2–1	Alex Box Stadium	Ott (2–1)	Lott (0–1)		8,950	14–4	
19	March 18	McNeese State	6–3	Alex Box Stadium	Bradshaw (1–0)	Olson (0–2)	Ott (1)	9,188	15–4	
20	March 20	South Carolina	3–7	Carolina Stadium	Dyson (3–1)	Ranaudo (2–1)	Farottoe (4)	7,047	15–5	2–2
21	March 21	South Carolina	10–3	Carolina Stadium	Coleman (5–1)	Westmoreland (2–1)	None	7,995	16–5	3–2
22	March 22	South Carolina	11–3	Carolina Stadium	Ross (3–2)	Bangs (1–1)	Ott (2)	7,436	17–5	4–2
23	March 24	Harvard	4–3	Alex Box Stadium	Cain (1–0)	Keuper (0–2)	Ott (3)	8,778	18–5	
24	March 25	Harvard	10–2	Alex Box Stadium	Matulis (4–0)	Suter (2–2)		8,733	19–5	
25	March 27	#11 Ole Miss	4–7	Alex Box Stadium	Pomeranz (2–0)	Ranaudo (2–2)		9,257	19–6	4–3
26	March 28	#11 Ole Miss	6–5	Alex Box Stadium	Coleman (6–1)	Irwin (4–1)	Ott (4)	10,025	20–6	5–3
27	March 29	#11 Ole Miss	2–1	Alex Box Stadium	Ross (4–2)	Morgan (2–1)	Ott (5)	10,011	21–6	6–3
28	March 31	Tulane	7–8	Turchin Stadium	Loup (1–1)	Matulis (4–1)	Pepitone (4)	4,987	21–7	

April
#	Date	Opponent	Score	Site/stadium	Win	Loss	Save	Attendance	Overall record	SEC record
29	April 3	#6 Georgia	8–4	Foley Field	Ranaudo (3–2)	Holder (5–2)		4,009	22–7	7–3
30	April 4	#6 Georgia	8–10	Foley Field	McRee (3–0)	Ross (4–3)		4,092	22–8	7–4
31	April 5	#6 Georgia	7–5	Foley Field	Coleman (7–1)	Harvil (2–1)	Ott (6)	3,377	23–8	8–4
32	April 8	Grambling	8–4	Alex Box Stadium	Cain (2–0)	Hinton (0–1)		8,674	24–8	
33	April 10	Alabama	8–5	Sewell-Thomas Stadium	Cain (3–0)	Kilcrease (1–2)	Ott (7)	4,686	25–8	9–4
34	April 11	Alabama	5–13	Sewell-Thomas Stadium	Howell (4–1)	Ross (4–4)		5,655	25–9	9–5
35	April 12	Alabama	12–7	Sewell-Thomas Stadium	Coleman (8–1)	Scott (1–1)		4,346	26–9	10–5
36	April 14	New Orleans	8–6	Alex Box Stadium	Bradshaw (2–0)	Henderson (3–4)	Bertuccini (2)	5,635	27–9	
37	April 15	Nicholls State	1–3	Alex Box Stadium	Harding (1–0)	Matulis (4–2)	Larson (6)	5,792	27–10	
38	April 17	Tennessee	18–3	Alex Box Stadium	Ranaudo (4–2)	Tullo (2–5)		7,155	28–10	11–5
39	April 18	Tennessee	5–7	Alex Box Stadium	Wiltz (1–1)	Coleman (8–2)	Morgado (2)	7,215	28–11	11–6
40	April 19	Tennessee	4–9	Alex Box Stadium	Harris (4–2)	Ross (4–5)		5,965	28–12	11–7
41	April 21	Southeastern Louisiana	6–5	Alex Box Stadium	Alsup (1–0)	Herring (2–4)	Ott (8)	3,965	29–12	
42	April 22	Louisiana-Lafayette	10–6	Zephyr Field	Bertuccini (1–0)	Lackie (1–1)		6,601	30–12	
43	April 24	Auburn	7–3	Alex Box Stadium	Ranaudo (5–2)	Jacobs (3–3)	Ott (9)	9,665	31–12	12–7
44	April 25	Auburn	7–6	Alex Box Stadium	Ott (3–1)	Hubbard (2–2)		5,896	32–12	13–7
45	April 26	Auburn	7–6	Alex Box Stadium	Bradshaw (3–0)	Hendrix (7–3)	Ott (10)	5,998	33–12	14–7
46	April 29	Tulane	13–2^{(7)}	Alex Box Stadium	Matulis (5–2)	Loup (2–4)		5,008	34–12	

May
#	Date	Opponent	Score	Site/stadium	Win	Loss	Save	Attendance	Overall record	SEC record
47	May 2	#12 Arkansas	4–11	Baum Stadium	Keuchel (7–1)	Ranaudo (5–3)	–	8,759	34–13	14–8
48	May 2	#12 Arkansas	5–0	Baum Stadium	Coleman (9–2)	Forrest (2–4)	–	8,759	35–13	15–8
49	May 3	#12 Arkansas	4–3	Baum Stadium	Ross (5–5)	Eibner (4–3)	Ott (11)	8,108	36–13	16–8
50	May 8	#11 Florida	10–1	Alex Box Stadium	Ranaudo (6–3)	Locke (3–1)		9,030	37–13	17–8
51	May 9	#11 Florida	4–0	Alex Box Stadium	Coleman (10–2)	DeSclafani (5–2)		9,131	38–13	18–8
52	May 10	#11 Florida	3–9	Alex Box Stadium	Maronde (3–1)	Ross (5–6)		6,318	38–14	18–9
53	May 12	Centenary	12–4	Alex Box Stadium	Matulis (6–2)	Hagen (1–2)		5,644	39–14	
54	May 14	Mississippi State	5–4	Dudy Noble Field	Ranaudo (7–3)	Crosswhite (0–4)	Ott (12)	6,307	40–14	19–9
55	May 15	Mississippi State	7–8	Dudy Noble Field	Houston (2–2)	Ott (3–2)		6,487	40–15	19–10
56	May 16	Mississippi State	15–4	Dudy Noble Field	Cain (4–0)	Jones (0–4)		2,440	41–15	20–10

Post-season

SEC baseball tournament
#	Date	Opponent	Score	Site/stadium	Win	Loss	Save	Attendance	Overall record	SECT Record
57	May 20	Vanderbilt	1–4	Regions Park	Minor (6–4)	Ross (5–7)	None		41–16	0–1
58	May 21	#18 Alabama	9–6	Regions Park	Ranaudo (8–3)	Hyatt (8–2)	Ott (13)	6,524	42–16	1–1
59	May 22	#25 South Carolina	4–1	Regions Park	Coleman (11–2)	Belcher (4–4)	Ott (14)	7,243	43–16	2–1
60	May 23	Georgia	16–0^{(7)}	Regions Park	Bradshaw (4–0)	McRee (4–4)	None		44–16	3–1
61	May 23	Georgia	3–2^{(7)}	Regions Park	Cain (5–0)	Harvil (4–2)	Bertuccini (3)	5,356	45–16	4–1
62	May 24	Vanderbilt	6–2	Regions Park	Byrd (1–0)	Christiani (5–6)	None	7,092	46–16	5–1

NCAA tournament: Regionals
#	Date	Opponent	Score	Site/stadium	Win	Loss	Save	Attendance	Overall record	NCAAT Record
63	May 29	Southern	10–2	Alex Box Stadium	Bertuccini (2–0)	Richard (6–4)	None	8,641	47–16	1–0
64	May 30	Baylor	3–2 ^{(10)}	Alex Box Stadium	Ranaudo (9–3)	Volz (3–7)	Ott (15)	9,149	48–16	2–0
65	May 31	#21 Minnesota	10–3	Alex Box Stadium	Coleman (12–2)	Bechstein (0–1)	None	8,820	49–16	3–0

NCAA tournament: Super Regionals
#	Date	Opponent	Score	Site/stadium	Win	Loss	Save	Attendance	Overall record	NCAAT Record
66	June 5	#6 Rice	12–9	Alex Box Stadium	Ranaudo (10–3)	Wall (7–6)	None	9,375	50–16	4–0
67	June 6	#6 Rice	5–3	Alex Box Stadium	Coleman (13–2)	Berry (7–2)	Ott (16)	9,651	51–16	5–0

College World Series
#	Date	Opponent	Score	Site/stadium	Win	Loss	Save	Attendance	Overall record	NCAAT Record
68	June 13	#5 Virginia	9–5	Rosenblatt Stadium	Ross (6–7)	Packer (3–5)	None	24,904	52–16	6–0
69	June 15	#8 Arkansas	9–1	Rosenblatt Stadium	Coleman (14–2)	Eibner (5–5)	None	23,417	53–16	7–0
70	June 19	#8 Arkansas	14–5	Rosenblatt Stadium	Ranaudo (11–3)	Richards (6–2)	None	19,734	54–16	8–0
71	June 22	#4 Texas	7–6^{(11)}	Rosenblatt Stadium	Ott (4–2)	Workman (3–4)	None	23,019	55–16	9–0
72	June 23	#4 Texas	5–1	Rosenblatt Stadium	Jungmann (11–3)	Ross (6–8)	None	21,871	55–17	9–1
73	June 24	#4 Texas	11–4	Rosenblatt Stadium	Ranaudo (12–3)	Workman (3–5)	None	19,986	56–17	10–1

*Rankings are based on the team's current ranking in the Baseball America poll the week LSU faced each opponent.

== Game Summaries/Recaps ==
=== Regular season ===
==== February ====
===== Villanova =====
LSU began the season with a three-game home series against Villanova. The start of baseball season, also marked the opening of a brand new stadium for LSU. The new Alex Box Stadium was completed after the 2008 season, and the Tigers moved into the stadium shortly before the 2009 season kicked off. LSU opened the season on February 20 with a 12–3 victory behind the right arm of Louis Coleman. LSU won game 2 11–1 and completed the sweep winning Sunday's contest 6–3.

===== Southern =====
There was little time to rest after the weekend sweep, as the Southern Jaguars made their first trip to the new "box" on Wednesday February 25. Freshman Chris Matulis got the start for the Tigers. He pitched five strong innings before turning the ball over to the bullpen with a 4–1 lead. LSU was able to hold on to the lead to claim the victory 11–5 to improve to 4–0 on the young season.

===== Central Florida =====
Two former Tiger assistants returned to the "box" for the weekend series against Central Florida, but this time they were in the opposite dugout. Terry Rooney left LSU after the 2008 season to become head coach at UCF and brought former Tiger assistant Cliff Godwin with him. Both coaches were an integral part in LSU's magical run to Omaha during the 2008 season, but UCF had a large hill to climb. The Knights were no match for LSU as the Tigers outscored them 13–4, 11–2, and 16–0 to claim another series sweep.

==== May ====
LSU entered the last month of the regular season with an overall record of 34–11. They were in first place in the SEC Western Division and were tied with Georgia for the overall SEC lead with a record of 14–7.

===== #12 Arkansas =====
With Arkansas only a half game back of LSU for the SEC West lead, the weekend series was pivotal for both teams. Unfortunately, both teams had to wait until Saturday to play the first game due to inclement weather. In game 1 of the Saturday double header, Arkansas fell behind early, but was able to overcome the deficit thanks to a dominating pitching effort by Dallas Keuchel that helped Arkansas take game 1, 11–4. Keuchel pitched 8.1 innings and improved to 7–1 overall on the season.

Going into game 2 of the doubleheader, LSU now trailed Arkansas by a half game for the SEC West lead. Much like game 1, the second game was also dominated by pitching, but this time it was LSU pitching that dominated. Senior RHP Louis Coleman was about nab a complete game, 2-hit shutout as LSU won the game 5–0. This placed LSU back at the top of the SEC West standings with a 15–8 record in conference play and 35–13 overall.

The rubber game of the series stayed true to form. LSU was again able to jump out to an early lead, going up 4–0 heading into the bottom of the fourth inning. That would be the last runs LSU plated in the game. Arkansas fought back to bring the score to 4–3 after the 5th, but LSU starter Austin Ross was able to keep the score there through the 6th. Coach Mainieri went to the bullpen after Ross gave up a leadoff single to begin the 7th. Sophomore Chad Jones came in and shut down the Razorbacks. Coach Mainieri went to the bullpen once again at the beginning of the 8th inning, bringing in freshman closer Matty Ott. Ott struck out the side in the 8th and closed out the game with a 1–2–3 9th to preserve the victory and give LSU the series 2–1.

===== #11 Florida =====
Florida traveled to Baton Rouge for another pivotal SEC series. Going into the weekend, both teams were sitting atop their respective divisions and tied for the overall SEC lead with a record of 16–8. In game 1, LSU used a strong outing from Anthony Ranaudo, as well as productive nights at the plate from D.J. LeMahieu and Blake Dean to take game 1 10–1. LSU grabbed the lead in the bottom of the third by scoring two runs and added 4 more in the bottom of the fourth to give Ranaudo a 6–0 lead. Florida scored their lone run in the top of the fifth. The win pushed LSU's mark to 17–8 and gave the Tigers the outright lead in the SEC.

In game 2, LSU received another great pitching performance from senior leader Louis Coleman. Coleman was able to give the Tigers 8 strong innings, allowing only 4 hits, 1 walk, and most importantly 0 runs. LSU plated two runs in the bottom of the first inning to give Coleman the early lead and they never looked back. LSU would score a third run in the bottom of the fourth, and their final run in the bottom of the eighth to win the game 4–0 and clinch another SEC series victory. LSU improved to 18–8 in the SEC, while Florida fell to 16–10.

The final game of the series was much different from the first two. Florida was able to secure its first lead in the series when they scored 3 runs in the top of the third. LSU was able to cut the deficit to 2 runs twice by scoring a run in the bottom of the fourth and fifth, but Florida was able to add more runs scoring 1 in the top of the fifth, 3 in the top of the seventh, and 2 in the top of the eighth. Florida took game 3 by a score of 9–3. The weekend left LSU with an overall record of 38–14 and 18–9 in the SEC. Even with the game 3 loss, LSU was able to remain atop the SEC standings with a half game lead over Alabama entering the last weekend of both SEC and regular season play.

===== Centenary =====
LSU hosted Centenary in the final home game of the regular season, which also marked the completion of their first regular season in the new Alex Box Stadium. The Gents entered the game 28–14 on the season, while LSU entered the game 38–14 overall. LSU got up early scoring 2 runs in the bottom of the 1st inning, and extended their lead to 5–0 after a 3-run home run by freshman CF Mikie Mahtook. Centenary cut the lead to 5–3 in the top of the 5th and made it 5–4 in the top of the 8th, but LSU roared back in the bottom of the 8th to score 7 runs. LSU won the game 12–4 improving to 39–14 on the season. LSU finished the regular season with a 28–9 home record.

===== Mississippi St. =====
LSU traveled to Starkville, MS for the final weekend of the regular season. The games for the series followed SEC procedures, and were played Thursday through Saturday, instead of the typical Friday – Sunday weekend series. The SEC established this procedure to give teams more rest between the end of the regular season and the start of the SEC Tournament.

In game 1, LSU jumped out to a quick lead behind a first inning Mikie Mahtook solo home run, but LSU would not hold the lead for long. Mississippi St. tied the game in the bottom of the second inning at 1, before taking the lead 4–1, in the bottom of the third inning. The Bulldogs would hold on to that lead entering the seventh inning, but the LSU offense erupted for 3 runs to tie the game at 4. In the top of the eighth inning, LSU used a wild pitch to score what would be the winning the run. LSU received a gutsy performance by starting pitcher Anthony Ranaudo who pitched 7.1 innings before turning the ball over to freshman closer Matty Ott. Ott finished the game to secure his twelfth save of the season as the Tigers improved to 40–15 overall and 19–8 in SEC play.

A win in game 2 would ensure that LSU would at worst share the SEC regular season title. Much like game 1 though, LSU played catch-up most of the game. The Bulldogs jumped out to an early 3–0 lead after the first inning. They added a single run in the fourth inning and 3 in the sixth inning to take a 7–3 lead into the top of the ninth inning. LSU cut the lead to 7–5, but was down to their final out with pre-season All-America selection Blake Dean at the plate. Dean delivered a two-run home run to tie the game at 7. However, in the bottom of the ninth inning, the Bulldogs were able to take advantage of an error to load the bases before Cody Freeman delivered a game-winning single. The Bulldogs evened the series at 1, with a dramatic 8–7 victory.

In game 3, LSU seemed more determined than ever to secure the SEC title. The Tigers jumped out to a 6–1 lead after two innings and never looked back. The Tigers endured nearly a two-hour rain delay to win the game by the final score of 15–4. The Tigers were led by sophomore outfielder Leon Landry who blasted three home runs in the contest, finishing a 5 for 6 day at the plate with 7 RBIs. With the win, LSU finished the regular season 41–15 overall, posting a 20–10 mark in conference play. The Ole Miss Rebels also posted a 20–10 mark in conference play, but a series victory over the Rebels earlier in the year gave LSU the No. 1 seed in the 2009 SEC baseball tournament.

=== SEC tournament ===
The 2009 SEC baseball tournament was held at Regions Park in Hoover, AL from May 20 through 24. The winner of the 2009 tournament earned the Southeastern Conference's automatic bid to the 2009 NCAA Division I baseball tournament.

After tying Ole Miss as co-champions for the 2009 SEC regular season title, LSU earned the No. 1 seed in the tournament. LSU earned the No. 1 seed over Ole Miss as a result of head-to-head play during the season.

==== Vanderbilt ====
LSU opened SEC Tournament play against Vanderbilt. After 3 scoreless innings for both teams, Vanderbilt catcher Andrew Giobbi hit a solo home run in the top of the 4th to give the Commodores the lead. Vanderbilt would score another run in the top of the 5th, and add two more in the 7th to extend their lead to 4–0. LSU would score their lone run in the bottom of the 7th, but the 4–1 deficit would prove to be too much for the top seeded Tigers. Vanderbilt starter Mike Minor threw a complete game to help the Commordores advance in the winner's bracket. LSU fell into the loser's bracket and would face Alabama in an elimination game the next day.

==== #18 Alabama ====
After completing their first game around 2:00 am CST and losing in extra innings, Alabama had a quick turn around to face LSU in their second game in the tournament with the loser being eliminated. LSU jumped out to 1–0 lead after two innings, but in the top of the 3rd Alabama would score 2 runs to take a 2–1 lead. LSU would fight right back in the bottom half with 4 runs to retake the lead 5–2 and extending it in the 4th by another run. In the seventh inning, up 6–3, LSU would receive a pinch hit 3-run home run from Senior Derek Helenihi which would ultimately prove to be the winning hit. LSU starter Anthony Ranaudo went 7+ innings allowing only 4 runs, before turning the ball over to the bullpen. Freshman closer Matty Ott entered the game in the 8th inning with the bases loaded and two outs. He got Tyler Odle to ground out to end the inning, and would close the game out in the 9th. The Tigers won 9–6 and moved on to face South Carolina in another elimination game. Alabama finished the tournament 0–2.

==== #25 South Carolina ====
After beating Alabama in their first game of the tournament, South Carolina lost by a run after Vanderbilt scored in the top of the 9th inning. Much like their first game against Alabama, their second game also went into the early hours of the next day. The game was very much a pitching duel, with senior ace Louis Coleman on the mound for the Tigers and freshman star Nolan Belcher on the mound for the Gamecocks. Neither team could scratch a run through the first 5 innings, but LSU was able to take advantage of 3 hits in the top of the 6th to take a 2–0 lead. LSU extended the lead in the 8th, scoring 2 more runs, which would complete the scoring for the Tigers. Coleman was able to pitch 8 strong innings allowing a single run in the 8th and earning his 11th win on the season. Freshman Matt Ott once again pitched the 9th to secure the victory for the Tigers, 4–1. As a result of the flipped bracket format, LSU would face Georgia next. LSU would have to beat the Dawgs twice in order to continue playing.

==== Championship: Vanderbilt ====
After defeating Georgia twice on Saturday, LSU earned a spot in the SEC Tournament championship game. LSU would face the team it lost to on day 1 of the tournament, Vanderbilt. The Commodores breezed through the tournament, despite being the No. 8 seed, having won their first three games, 4–1, 9–5, and 11–1. Though Vanderbilt had not lost yet in the tournament, the championship game is a winner-take-all format. LSU sent senior LHP Ryan Byrd to the mound, while Vanderbilt countered with Nick Christiani.

LSU wasted no time taking an early lead. Leon Landry opened the game with a lead-off double, and scored 2 batters later. Byrd was able to hold the Commodores offense in check through the first 3 innings, allowing 2 hits, while Christiani settled in as well after Landry's double. In the fourth inning though LSU extended its lead. Another lead-off double by Micah Gibbs, followed by a Mikie Mahtook single, pushed the score to 2–0. Mahtook scored as well after a stolen base, infield single, and sac fly to give the Tigers a 3–0 lead after 3.5 innings. The fourth inning was also the last inning for Christiani.

Vanderbilt was able to cut the lead to 3–1 in the bottom half of the fourth off a Steven Liddle solo home run, but the Tigers wasted no time getting the run back. In the 5th, LSU was able to score 2 more runs off a walk, another double by Landry, and sac fly by Blake Dean. LSU now held a 5–1 lead and was in complete control of the game. Each team would go on to score another run in the 7th to make the score 6–2 which would prove to be the final score. Byrd pitched one of the best games of his career. He went 7 innings, allowing 5 hits, 2 earned runs, with 3 strikeouts and 1 walk. If was the first game Byrd has pitched in this year where he factored into the decision. It was the second consecutive SEC Tournament championship for LSU and their record 8th overall.

After the tournament, freshman Mikie Mahtook was named the tournament MVP. In the tournament, Mahtook was 10–22 (.454) with 3 RBIs, 2 runs scored, and 17 put outs. Fellow teammates Blake Dean, Austin Nola, and Daniel Bradshaw were also named to the all-tournament team.

=== NCAA tournament: Regionals ===
The regional round of the 2009 NCAA Division I baseball tournament will be played at various hosts sites from May 29 through June 1. The NCAA announced on May 24, 2009, that LSU was selected as the host site for the Baton Rouge regional. There are 16 total sites with 4 teams playing at each site.

On Monday May 25, 2009 the NCAA released the post-season bracket for the 2009 NCAA Division I baseball tournament. LSU was announced as the No. 3 overall seed in the tournament.

==== Southern ====
LSU began NCAA tournament play on Friday May 29 against the Southern Jaguars. It didn't take long for Southern to establish a lead. Southern led the game off with a single, followed by a home run to take an early 2–0 lead. Southern held onto the 2–0 lead until LSU was able to plate a single run in the bottom of the 6th. The 2–1 lead would hold only for an inning, as LSU plated 7 runs in the bottom of the seventh to take control of the game. Southern received an excellent outing from starting pitcher Chase Richard who went 6.2 innings giving up 7 hits and allowing 3 runs, 2 earned. LSU would add 2 more runs in the 8th and close out Game 1 of the regional with a 10–2 win.

=== NCAA tournament: Super Regionals ===
The super regional round of the 2009 NCAA Division I baseball tournament was played from June 5 through June 8 at 8 different sites. The host sites were Austin, Baton Rouge, Chapel Hill, Fullerton, Gainesville, Oxford, Tallahassee, and Tempe.

As a result of earning the No. 3 overall seed and winning the Baton Rouge Regional, LSU hosted the Rice Owls who advanced out of the Houston Regional. Game 1 was played on Friday June 5, while Game 2 was played the following day on Saturday June 6.

==== #6 Rice (Game 1) ====
Game 1 of the Baton Rouge super regional featured two dominant right-handed pitchers. LSU handed the ball to sophomore Anthony Ranaudo, while Rice sent junior Mike Ojala to the mound. Rice was able to take the lead early off multiple LSU errors. Rice scored 2 unearned runs in the 2nd and another unearned run in the 4th. LSU would finally get on the board in bottom of the 4th, scoring a single run, but Rice got the run back in the 5th on a solo home run by Steven Sultzbaugh. With half the game complete, Rice held onto a 4–1 lead, but the bottom of the 5th proved to be the turning point. Rice pulled Ojala in favor of Taylor Wall with runners on second and third, no outs and a run already across the plate. Wall was brought in to face lefty Ryan Schimpf, but the move proved to be a costly one. Schimpf sent a ball over the right-center fence to give LSU a 5–4 lead. LSU would tack on 2 additional runs to give the Tigers a 7–4 lead after 5 innings, a lead the Tigers would not give up. Rice would score 2 runs in the 8th and 3 in the 9th for a total of 9 on the night, but LSU pushed 2 more runs across in the 7th and 3 in the 8th to win the game 12–9. LSU would need only one more win to advance to Omaha.

==== #6 Rice (Game 2) ====
LSU would be the visiting team for the second game of the Baton Rouge super regional. Each team sent their ace to the mound for game 2. LSU was hoping senior RHP Louis Coleman could clinch the super regional for the Tigers while Rice was hoping junior sensation Ryan Berry would extend their season.

LSU would jump out to an early 1–0 lead in the 1st inning capitalizing on a double and two walks. Rice would tie the game in the 3rd on a solo home run by Brock Holt, who also homered the night before. LSU took the lead back in the 4th inning, but Rice again tied the game at 2 in the bottom half of the inning. The 5th inning would once again prove to be the decisive one in the game. LSU would score 2 runs in the top half of the inning to take the lead, a lead they would hold onto the rest of the game. Each team would score a run in the 6th inning, bringing the score to 5–3. That would be it for scoring in this game. Coleman went 8 strong innings, while Berry only made it through the 5th. LSU freshman closer Matty Ott came in to pitch the 9th, and secure the victory. With the win, LSU advances to the 2009 College World Series. It will be LSU's 15th appearance at the CWS.

After setting an Alex Box record the night before for actual attendance with 9,375, LSU fans once again poured into the stadium to see their Tigers. Game 2 would break the record set the night before as 9,651 witnessed the final game in the new Alex Box Stadium's inaugural season.

=== NCAA tournament: College World Series ===
The 2009 College World Series was held at Rosenblatt Stadium in Omaha, NE from June 13 through June 24.

LSU was in Bracket 1 along with Arkansas, Cal St. Fullerton, and Virginia. Bracket 1 began play Saturday June 13. Fullerton squared off with Arkansas in game 1, with LSU against Virginia in game 2.

Bracket 2 began play on Sunday June 14 and included Texas, Southern Miss, North Carolina, and Arizona St.

==== #5 Virginia ====
LSU opened up College World Series play in game 2 on Day 1. LSU squared off against the Virginia Cavaliers. A game that matched LSU head coach Paul Mainieri against one of his former assistants Brian O'Connor. Virginia earned a berth in the 2009 College World Series by winning the Fullerton Regional and defeating Ole Miss in the Oxford Super Regional.

Sophomore RHP Anthony Ranaudo opened the game with a 1–2–3 first inning. In the bottom of the first, after getting the first two batters out, Virginia's Danny Hutzen gave up a double to Blake Dean. Micah Gibbs followed Dean's double with an RBI single to give LSU an early 1–0 lead. After both teams failed to score in the second, the Cavaliers were able to take advantage of a couple sacrifices to tie the game at 1. LSU quickly answered in the bottom half of the third scoring 2 runs off 4 hits to regain the lead 3–1. Virginia added a single run in the 4th to close the gap to a run, and took their first ever lead in the CWS in the top of the fifth scoring 2 runs on 4 hits to lead 4–3. Once again though, LSU answered the call. Junior first baseman Sean Ochinko hit a 3-run home run over the left field wall to give LSU a 6–4 lead, a lead they would not give up.

The Cavaliers would cut the lead to 6–5 in the 7th inning, but LSU scored 3 more runs in the 8th to extend the lead to 9–6 which would prove to be the final score. The two teams combined for 28 hits. The win moved LSU into the winner's bracket, where they would square off against SEC rival Arkansas in the second round. The Cavaliers next faced Cal. St. Fullerton in an elimination game.

==== Finals: No. 4 Texas (Game 1) ====
LSU and Texas met for only the third time ever in the College World Series with Texas winning the first meeting back in 1987 and LSU winning the second meeting in 2000. The two teams combined for 11 national championships. The 2009 finals marked LSU's first appearance since 2000 in the College World Series finals and the first time they have made the championship series since it became best 2 out of 3. Texas was returning to the finals for the first time since winning it all back in 2005. It was determined that LSU would be the home team for games 1 and 3 via coin flip. LSU was sending senior RHP Louis Coleman to the mound, while Texas countered with sophomore RHP Chance Ruffin.

LSU would jump out to an early 1–0 lead in the top of the 1st inning, as Ryan Schimpf crushed a home run over the left-center field fence. After managing only 1 hit in the first 3 innings off Coleman, Texas would get on the board in the bottom of the 4th with 3 solo home runs to take the lead 3–1. Texas would hold on to that lead for only 1 inning, as Jared Mitchell came through for the Tigers with a 2 RBI triple in the 6th to tie the game at 3. Texas would fight right back in the bottom half of the inning with another solo home run and a wild pitch to retake the lead 5–3. Each team would add a run in the 7th, Texas' another solo home run, to give Texas a 6–4 lead. A lead they would hold on to until the top of the 9th.

Down to the last 3 outs, LSU needed to push 2 runs across to tie the game. Jared Mitchell was first up to bat and quickly grounded out to the shortstop. Junior first baseman Sean Ochinko singled through the left side to bring the tying run to the plate. After the single, Texas would make a pitching change to bring in freshman Taylor Jungmann to face senior third baseman Derek Helenihi. Helenihi who was in a 1–15 slump in the CWS was able to draw a four pitch walk. Freshman Tyler Hanover was brought in to pinch hit, but after getting up 2–0 in the count, Auggie Garrido once again made a pitching change. Brandon Workman was brought in, and would battle to eventually get Hanover to strike out. Down to their last out in game 1 of the finals, LSU's lead off hitter D.J. LeMahieu stepped to the plate with runners on first and second. LeMahieu wasted no time, crushing the first pitch into the left field corner for a 2 RBI double that tied the game. After Ryan Schimpf was intentionally walked, Workman was able to get Blake Dean to fly out to end the top half of the inning. LSU brought in freshman closer Matty Ott to pitch the 9th. After hitting the first batter, Ott was able to record 3 straight outs to send the game into extra innings.

In the top of the 10th, LSU loaded the bases with only 1 out, but was unable to push a run across. Ott pitched the bottom half of the 10th, and once again was able to keep the Texas offense in check. D.J. LeMahieu was up first in the 11th, and drew a lead off walk. After getting Schimpf and Dean to fly out, it appeared Workman was going to get out of the inning. With Gibbs up to bat, LeMahieu took off and stole second. A throwing error by the catcher, Cameron Rupp, allowed LeMahieu to advance to third. Workman would intentionally walk Gibbs to set up the force play. Freshman Mikie Mahtook came to the plate having struck out 3 times earlier in the game, but delivered the game-winning hit. Mahtook single back up the middle scoring LeMahieu to put the Tigers up 7–6. LSU would leave Ott in to pitch his 3rd inning of relief work. Ott struck out the first 2 batters he faced, then got Connor Rowe to ground out to second base to secure the victory for the Tigers.

==== Finals: No. 4 Texas (Game 2) ====
With LSU looking to claim their 6th national title and Texas facing elimination, the Longhorns sent freshman Taylor Jungmann to the mound. LSU countered with sophomore Austin Ross who hadn't started a game since game 1 of the Baton Rouge regional. Texas was the visiting team for game 2 and wasted no time taking the lead. The Longhorns pieced together a couple hits to go with a throwing error to take a 1–0 lead after the top of the first inning. They added another run in the second off a solo home run by Preston Clark. The 2–0 lead would be all the Jungmann would need. LSU would push their lone run across in the bottom of the second. After singles by Jared Mitchell and Leon Landry, Derek Helenihi hit a ball up the middle that was misplayed by shortstop Brandon Loy. Mitchell would score an unearned run on the play to cut Texas' lead in half.

Ross was lifted after only pitching 2 innings, but it made no difference. Texas added 3 more runs in the top of third, one coming off a solo home run by Russell Moldenhauer, to extend their lead to 5–1. Those runs ended up being the final scoring for the night for both teams. Texas would finish the game with 12 hits in all, while committing 3 errors. LSU would only manage 5 hits on the evening, and never could take advantage of any opportunities. Longhorn starter, Jungmann, would go on to throw a complete game, striking out 9 and only walking 2. The win forced a rubber match the next for, with the winner of the pivotal game 3 being crowned 2009 NCAA Baseball National Champions.

==== Finals: No. 4 Texas (Game 3) ====
After a complete game effort by Jungmann the night before, Texas was hoping sophomore starter Cole Green would be able to put forth a similar effort. LSU countered with sophomore ace Anthony Ranaudo who was making his third start in the College World Series. LSU was once again the home team, and wasted no time taking the early lead. After recording two quick outs, Green hit Blake Dean with a pitch to keep the inning alive. Junior Sean Ochinko was up next and singled through the left side. First-round draft pick Jared Mitchell stepped to the plate. With one swing of the bat he gave the Tigers the early lead sending a 3-run home run over the right field fence. In the bottom half of the inning, Ranaudo pitched around 2 singles and a walk to get out of a bases loaded jam with no damage done. In the second inning LSU extended their lead to 4–0 after piecing together 3 hits in the inning, but the lead did not last long.

Texas took advantage of a couple walks and 2 big hits to cut LSU's lead in half, but Texas once again left the bases loaded. After neither team scored in the 4th inning, it was once again Texas' turn to bat in the 5th still down 4–2. A lead-off single by Cameron Rupp brought the tying run to the plate. Kevin Keyes delivered by sending a 2-run home run over the left field bleachers tying the game at 4 runs apiece.

The top of the 6th inning proved to be the turning point in the game. LSU took advantage of 2 walks, 2 hit batters, an error, and 2 hits to score a total of 5 runs. LSU now held a 9–4 lead, a lead they would not let go of. LSU starter Anthony Ranaudo pitched 5.1 innings, giving up 8 hits, 4 runs, and 5 walks, but still got the win to improve his record to 12–3 on the season. Sophomore Chad Jones pitched 1.2 hitless innings while striking out 2 batters. LSU would extend their lead to 10–4 after a double, single, and sac fly in the inning. Coach Mainieri brought in senior Louis Coleman to pitch the 8th inning. Coleman was able to work around a 1-out double to get out of the inning without giving up a run. LSU added another run in the 9th off a solo home run by Ochinko to extend the lead to 11–4. Coleman was brought back out to finish the game off. After a lead-off walk, Coleman struck out the side to secure the victory.

The victory marked the 6th national championship for LSU baseball, the first since 2000. It was also the only championship for head coach Paul Mainieri. LSU finished the season 56–17.

== Rankings ==
Ranking movement
Poll	Pre- season	Feb. 23	Mar. 2	Mar. 9	Mar. 16	Mar. 23	Mar. 30	Apr. 6	Apr. 13	Apr. 20	Apr. 27	May 4	May 11	May 18	May 25	June 2	June 9	Final Poll
USA Today/ESPN Coaches' Poll (Top 25)	1							4	3	8	5	4	3	3	2	–	–	1
Baseball America (Top 25)	2	2	1	4	5	2	2	2	1	6	5	3	2	2	2	1	1	1
Collegiate Baseball (Top 30)	1	1	1	3	6	4	5	4	1	9	4	3	2	2	2	1	1	1
NCBWA (Top 30)^	2	2	1	5	9	7	5	3	1	7	5	4	2	2	2	1	1	1
Rivals.com (Top 25)	2	2	2	7	7	4	4	2	2	8	5	3	2	2	2	–	–	1

- NR = Not ranked
- ^ The NCBWA ranked 35 teams in their preseason poll but only 30 teams during the season.

== Awards and honors ==
Five Baseball Players Named Preseason All-Americans
SEC Announces Annual Baseball Honors
"LOUISVILLE SLUGGER'S" All-American Baseball Teams

2009 SEC Baseball All-Tournament Team
NCAA Baton Rouge Regional All-Tournament Team

Daniel Bradshaw

- 2009 SEC Baseball All-Tournament Team

Louis Coleman

- Pre-Season Second Team All-America
- SEC Pitcher of the Week (March 10 – March 17)
- First Team All-SEC Selection
- SEC Pitcher of the Year (Unanimous Selection)
- Louisville Slugger First Team All-American
- NCAA Baton Rouge Regional All-Tournament Team Selection
- Rivals.com All-American Selection
- Baseball America All-American Selection
- ABCA All-American Selection

Blake Dean

- Pre-Season First Team All-America
- SEC Player of the Week (April 6 – April 13)
- First Team All-SEC Selection
- 2009 SEC Baseball All-Tournament Team

Micah Gibbs

- Pre-Season Second Team All-America
- SEC Player of the Week (March 31 – April 6)
- Selected to All-SEC Defensive Team
- NCAA Baton Rouge Regional All-Tournament Team
- 2009 Rawlings NCAA Division I Gold Glove Team

D. J. LeMahieu

- Pre-Season Third Team All-America
- 2009 All-College World Series Selection

Mikie Mahtook

- Selected to All-Freshman SEC Team
- 2009 SEC Baseball All-Tournament Team
- 2009 SEC Baseball Tournament Most Valuable Player

Jared Mitchell

- NCAA Baton Rouge Regional All-Tournament Team
- 2009 All-College World Series Selection
- 2009 College World Series Most Outstanding Player

Sean Ochinko

- NCAA Baton Rouge Regional All-Tournament Team

Matty Ott

- SEC Pitcher of the Week (March 17 – March 24)
- SEC Pitcher of the Week (April 20 – April 27)
- First Team All-SEC Selection
- SEC Co-Freshmen of the Year
- Louisville Slugger Third Team All-American
- Louisville Slugger Freshman All-American
- NCBWA Freshman All-American
- ABCA Third Team All-American
- Rivals.com Freshman All-American
- Baseball America First Team Freshman All-American

Austin Nola

- 2009 SEC Baseball All-Tournament Team
- NCAA Baton Rouge Regional All-Tournament Team

Austin Ross

- SEC Pitcher of the Week (February 23 – March 2)
- SEC Pitcher of the Week (March 24 – March 31)

Anthony Ranaudo

- National Player of the Week (April 20 – April 27)
- Second Team All-SEC Selection
- NCAA Baton Rouge Regional All-Tournament Team
- NCAA Baton Rouge Regional Most Outstanding Player
- 2009 All-College World Series Selection

Ryan Schimpf

- Pre-Season Second Team All-America
- SEC Player of the Week (February 20 – February 23)
- Second Team All-SEC Selection
- 2009 All-College World Series Selection

== LSU Tigers in the 2009 Major League Baseball draft ==
The following members and future members (denoted by *) of the LSU Tigers baseball program were drafted in the 2009 MLB draft.

Player	Position	Round	Overall	MLB Team
Jared Mitchell	OF	1	23	Chicago White Sox
Slade Heathcott*	OF	1	29	New York Yankees
DJ LeMahieu	INF	2	79	Chicago Cubs
Louis Coleman	RHP	5	152	Kansas City Royals
Ryan Schimpf	INF/OF	5	160	Toronto Blue Jays
Zack Von Rosenberg*	RHP	6	175	Pittsburgh Pirates
Brody Colvin*	RHP	7	227	Philadelphia Phillies
Chad Stang*	OF	8	256	Milwaukee Brewers
Blake Dean	OF	10	312	Minnesota Twins
Sean Ochinko	C/1B	11	340	Toronto Blue Jays
Mitchell Mormann*	RHP	20	597	San Francisco Giants
Wes Luquette*	C	27	805	Pittsburgh Pirates
Brett Bruening*	RHP	35	1065	New York Yankees
Forrest Garrett*	LHP	41	1234	Texas Rangers
