= Gru (disambiguation) =

Gru is a fictional character and the protagonist of the Despicable Me film series.

Gru or GRU may also refer to:

== Arts and entertainment ==
- Gru (rapper), Serbian rapper
- Gru, an antagonist in The Kine Saga

== Organizations ==
=== Georgia (country) ===
- Georgian Rugby Union
- Grigol Robakidze University

=== Poland ===
- Growth Research Unit, Cracow University of Economics

=== Soviet Union and Russia ===
- GRU (Russian Federation), Russian intelligence service
- GRU (Soviet Union), Soviet military intelligence service
- Spetsnaz GRU, Russian army special forces

=== United States ===
- Gainesville Regional Utilities, Florida
- Georgia Regents University, Georgia
- Georgia Rugby Union (United States)

== Science and technology ==
- Gated recurrent unit, mechanisms in recurrent neural networks
- Abbreviation for the constellation Grus

== Standardized codes ==
- GRU, IATA airport code of São Paulo–Guarulhos International Airport, Brazil
- gru, ISO 639-3 language code of the Soddo language

== See also ==
- Grue (disambiguation)
- Grus (disambiguation)
- Groo (disambiguation)
- Grew, a surname
- Grewe, a surname
