= Groo (disambiguation) =

Groo may refer to:

- Groo the Wanderer, a comic book series.
- Grooved ware, an archaeological culture
- The Groosalugg, a character in the television show Angel.
- Han Groo, a South Korean actress.

== See also ==
- Grue (disambiguation)
- GRU (disambiguation)
- Grew
- Grewe
