= The Atlantic Realists =

2022 book by Matthew G. Specter

- Cover
- Author: Matthew G. Specter
- Subject: History, politics, European history, intellectual and cultural politics
- Genre: Nonfiction
- Publisher: Stanford University Press
- Publication date: February, 2022
- Pages: 336
- ISBN: 9781503629967

The Atlantic Realists: Empire and International Political Thought Between Germany and the United States is a book by American historian, academic, and author Matthew G. Specter. (Note: Specter is a Senior Fellow, Institute of European Studies (IES) and a faculty affiliate at the Institute of International Studies, at UC Berkeley, an adjunct lecturer in History at Santa Clara University, and associate editor of the journal History and Theory. He is also a former Associate Professor of History at Central Connecticut State University.) It was published in 2022 by Stanford University Press.

== Background ==
In a 2022 interview with The Review of Democracy's editor Ferenc Laczó, Specter discussed his interest in Carl Schmitt, Hans Morgenthau, and Wilhelm Grewe, highlighting their relevance to understanding political thought. Specter critiqued the myth of realism as timeless wisdom, emphasizing its historical context and ideological dimensions. He underscored the transatlantic comparisons shaping realist thought, challenging narratives of American innocence and exceptionalism.

== Synopsis ==
The book explores the evolution of realism in international political thought through challenging conventional interpretations. Specter traces the roots of realism to a transatlantic dialogue between American and German intellectuals from the late 19th century, stressing its development amidst major historical events like world wars and the Cold War. He examines key figures such as Carl Schmitt, Hans Morgenthau, and Wilhelm Grewe, revealing the complex interplay of geopolitical analysis and national interest shaping realist perspectives. The book delves into the nuances of realist thought, including its entanglement with imperial aspirations and its reception in postwar American academia. Specter's comparative approach highlights the shared influences between German and American realists, offering insights into the intellectual and moral legacies of realism in international relations, and concluding that realist thought, in the past and in contemporary literature, is an "ideological justification for empire".

== Reviews ==
In her review of the book published by Foreign Affairs, and comparing it with Jonathan Kirshner's An Unwritten Future, Emma Ashford described Specter's study of realism as "an impressive contribution" but found the lessons that he draws as "less convincing". While Ashford agreed with Specter that the classical realists of the 1950s sourced their ideas from earlier amoral or "less ethical" theories of international relations, she contested the idea that such borrowing would sabotage their arguments. The reviewer noted that many thinkers and philosophers "reach to past for inspiration and support" and that one shouldn't blame classical realists for seeking a "longer, more diverse lineage for their ideas".

In his review, Adam Tooze compared Mearsheimer's study of offensive realism to that of Specter's detailed historical analysis. Mearsheimer traces back the roots of his theory to classic thinkers such as Thucydides and Machiavelli, whereas Specter draws a line back from the late 19th century's naval historians and geographers such as Friedrich Ratzel and Alfred Mahan, to influential German politicians and legal theorists such as Karl Haushofer and Carl Schmitt, and then to classic texts of American realism, revealing the "dark roots in the imperialist era" of realism.

Antonio Cerella defined the book illuminating and essential, as it challenges the traditional narrative of realism's origins in international politics. Specter's historical analysis exposes the roots of realism in imperial aspirations and power dynamics between Germany and the United States. Cerella praised Specter's meticulous research, which reveals the interconnectedness of geopolitical thought across the Atlantic. Cerella also acknowledged the book's broader implications for understanding power relations and hopes it will contribute to a less obscured future in international relations, particularly in the face of growing threats of war.

Steven J. Brady judged the book as thought-provoking and wrote:

Specter has written a truly excellent book that invites the reader to question their preconceived notions about a subject with which they probably felt familiar. Specter seeks to provide a genealogy of realism. In doing so, he posits that realism is a historical artifact, rather than a value-neutral, objective tool of analysis based on the ancient and immutable laws of international relations. Specter deftly demonstrates the ways in which realism developed through a two-way interchange between Germany and the United States, as well as how the American definition of "geopolitical" realism as being particularly German prevented Americans from confronting the similarities of their imperial history with that of their Atlantic interlocutor.

In his review of the book, Joshua Derman highlighted Specter's approach to studying 20th century's American realism in international relations as a "German-American coproduction" instead of viewing it as a German import like other historians did, namely Nicolas Guilhot in his 2017 book After the Enlightenment: Political Realism and International Relations in the Mid-Twentieth Century.

Davis Ellison emphasized praised Specter's for deeply studying and stressing the impact of thinkers like Hans Morgenthau, Edmund Walsh, Carl Schmitt, Wilhelm Grewe, and Nicholas Spykman on shaping international relations as an academic discipline, on American politicians and diplomats, and on Post-War American foreign policy with America as the most powerful and influential player in global affairs.

Duncan Kelly praised Specter for challenging conventional narratives of realism in political theory, particularly in the context of German and American political thought. Specter argues that the roots of realism lie in the concept of Weltpolitik rather than Realpolitik, highlighting the intertwined development of Atlantic Realists and their influence on international relations. However, Kelly suggested that recent scholarship has uncovered the exclusionary nature of realist thought, prompting a reevaluation of its imperial origins and implications for contemporary political teaching.

In her review of the book, Michaela Hoenicke Moore wrote:

This is an important contribution by a scholar of modern German intellectual history to the growing literature (Udi Greenberg, Nicolas Guilhot, Daniel Bessner, and, from a different angle, Stephen Wertheim) on the elective affinities and entangled German and American roots of Realism, here defined as that International Relations (IR) school which offers guidance on geo-politics and world power.

Felix Rösch acknowledged Specter's significant contribution to understanding the history of International Relations, particularly in highlighting the interconnections between German and American scholars from the 1920s to the 1950s. While praising Specter's comprehensive approach, Rösch also questioned the characterization of all scholars discussed as realists, suggesting a nuanced examination of their intellectual and personal connections would be more appropriate.

F. Peter Wagner praised the book for its historical-critical reconstruction of the development of Realism in International Relations/Foreign Policy Analysis (IR/FPA).

In his review, Michael C. Williams emphasized its significance in challenging conventional narratives of international political theory. While the reviewer appreciated the book's critique of realism's connections to geopolitics, he expressed reservations about completely rejecting realism, suggesting that there may still be valuable resources within it.
