= Grewe =

Grewe is a surname. Notable people with the surname include:

- Constance Grewe (born 1946), German judge and legal scholar
- David Grewe (born 1976), American baseball player and coach
- Sam Grewe (born 1998), American Paralympic high jumper
- Wilhelm Grewe (1911–2000), German diplomat and professor

== See also ==
- Grew
- Grue (disambiguation)
