= Grue =

Grue may refer to:

== People ==
- A pen name used by cartoonist Johnny Gruelle
- Grue (surname), notable people with the surname Grue

== Places ==
=== Norway ===
- Grue Municipality, a municipality in Innlandet county
- Grue, Eidsvoll, a small village in Eidsvoll Municipality in Akershus county
- Grue, Nes, a small village in Nes Municipality in Akershus county
- Grue Stadion, a stadium in Grue Municipality in Innlandet county

=== Other ===
- Isle-aux-Grues, an island in Quebec, Canada
- Grues, Vendée, a commune in France
- Grue (river), a river in north-west Italy

== In fiction ==
- Grue, a fictional predatory creature in the Zork series of interactive fiction computer games
- Grue, an alien race in the Freedom City setting of the role-playing game Mutants and Masterminds
- Grue/Brian Laborn, a supervillain in the web novel Worm

== Other ==
- Grue and bleen, portmanteau words formed from green and blue, coined by Nelson Goodman to illustrate his new riddle of induction
- Grue, a linguistic and translation concept (see Blue–green distinction in language)
- Crane (bird), a bird from the Grue family
- Grue, an influential science fiction fanzine published by Dean Grennell
- An early form of Nutraloaf, a food served in prison, known as "grue" to prisoners in the Arkansas penal system as described in the 1978 Hutto v. Finney decision
- Grue church fire, a historic fire at Grue Church in Grue Municipality in Innlandet county, Norway
- Grue IL, a sports club based in Grue Municipality in Innlandet county, Norway

== See also ==
- GRU (disambiguation)
- Grus (disambiguation)
- Groo (disambiguation)
- Grew
- Grewe
