= Chad Jones (American football) =

American baseball and football player (born 1988)

No. 35
- Position: Safety

Personal information
- Born: October 5, 1988 (age 38); New Orleans, Louisiana, U.S.
- Listed height: 6 ft 2 in (1.88 m)
- Listed weight: 221 lb (100 kg)

Career information
- High school: Southern Lab (Baton Rouge, Louisiana)
- College: LSU
- NFL draft: 2010: 3rd round, 76th overall pick

Career history
- New York Giants (2010–2011)

Awards and highlights
- Super Bowl champion (XLVI); College World Series champion (2009); BCS national champion (2007); Second-team All-SEC (2009)

Other information
- Baseball career
- Pitcher
- Bats: Left Throws: Left
- Stats at Baseball Reference

Chad D'Orsey Jones (born October 5, 1988) is an American former baseball and football player. He was selected by the New York Giants in the third round of the 2010 NFL draft, and the Cincinnati Reds in the ninth round of the 2013 MLB draft. He played college football and college baseball for the LSU Tigers.

== Early life ==
Jones attended St. Augustine High School in New Orleans before evacuating to Southern Laboratory High School in Baton Rouge, Louisiana following Hurricane Katrina. He was considered one of the best safeties in the nation and was the number one rated safety by Rivals.com and Scout.com. As a senior, he had 138 tackles and 12 interceptions as a safety and 464 yards and 12 touchdowns as a running back.

== Baseball career ==
Jones was selected by the Houston Astros in the 13th round of the 2007 Major League Baseball draft but decided to attend Louisiana State University. In 2009, he was a member of the Tigers 2009 national championship team. He pitched three innings during the series and did not allow a hit or run. Jones and his college teammate Jared Mitchell are the only two college athletes ever to claim a BCS national title and a baseball national title. During the regular season he had a 2.70 earned run average and struck out seven in 6.2 innings and also started eight of 27 games in the outfield. He was selected by the Milwaukee Brewers in the 50th round (1509th overall) of the 2010 MLB draft. After deciding to pursue baseball, he was also selected by the Cincinnati Reds in the 9th round (285 overall) of the 2013 MLB draft.

== Football career ==
=== College ===
As a true freshman in 2007 Jones played in all 14 of the Tigers games at cornerback and was a member of their National Championship team. He finished with 34 tackles, two sacks, and an interception. As a sophomore in 2008 Jones started six of 13 games, recording 50 tackles and an interception.

=== Professional ===
Jones was selected by the New York Giants in the third round (76th overall) of the 2010 NFL draft.

Jones was waived by the Giants on May 14, 2012, after failing a physical.

== Personal life ==
Jones's older brother, Rahim Alem, is a former defensive end for the Cincinnati Bengals.

Jones was involved in a single-car crash in New Orleans during the early morning hours of June 25, 2010. He lost control of his Range Rover while trying to get off streetcar tracks and hit a pole. Two of the passengers in his car suffered minor injuries. Jones's most serious injuries were to his left ankle and leg, which include a broken tibia and fibula.
