= Grew =

Grew is a surname. Notable people with the surname include:

- Dessie Grew (died 1990), INLA and Provisional IRA volunteer
- Seamus Grew (died 1982, INLA volunteer
- Henry Grew (1781–1862), English-born Christian teacher
- Jane Norton Grew (1868–1925), American socialite
- Joseph Grew (1880–1965), American diplomat
- Mark Grew (born 1958), English footballer
- Mary Grew (1813–1896), American abolitionist and suffragist
- Nehemiah Grew (1641–1712), English botanist

== See also ==
- GRU (disambiguation)
- Grue (disambiguation)
- Groo (disambiguation)
- Grewe
