= Gruss =

Gruss may refer to:

- 6516 Gruss, a main-belt asteroid
- Peter Gruss (born 1949), German developmental biologist
- Shoshanna Lonstein Gruss (born 1975), American fashion designer
- Robert Dwayne Gruss (born 1955), bishop of the Catholic Church in the United States

== See also ==
- Grüss Gott, literally, "God greet you", a German greeting
- Hitlergruss, the Nazi salute
- Grus (disambiguation)
