= Grus =

Grus may refer to:

- Grus (bird), a genus of birds in the crane family
  - Grus grus, the common crane
- Grus (constellation), the constellation "Crane"
- Grus (geology), an accumulation of angular, coarse-grained fragments (particles of sand and gravel) resulting from the granular disintegration of crystalline rocks

== See also ==
- Gruss (disambiguation)
- Grue (disambiguation)
- GRU (disambiguation)
