= 2009 Wichita State Shockers baseball team =

American college baseball season

2009 Wichita State Shockers baseball

MVC champion MVC Tournament champion

NCAA tournament, Regional
- Conference: Missouri Valley Conference
- Record: 30-27 (11-7 Missouri Valley)
- Head coach: Gene Stephenson (32nd season)
- Assistant coaches: Bret Kemnitz (31st season); Jim Thomas (17th season)
- Home stadium: Eck Stadium

2009 Missouri Valley Conference baseball standings
	Conf.				Overall
Team	W		L	PCT	W		L	PCT
Missouri State ‍‍‍	17	–	5	.773	34	–	20	.630
Indiana State ‍‍‍	15	–	7	.682	30	–	21	.588
Wichita State† ‍‍‍	11	–	7	.611	30	–	27	.526
Creighton ‍‍‍	14	–	9	.609	31	–	25	.554
Southern Illinois ‍‍‍	11	–	9	.550	24	–	28	.462
Illinois State ‍‍‍	11	–	11	.500	24	–	23	.511
Northern Iowa ‍‍‍	7	–	15	.318	21	–	26	.447
Evansville ‍‍‍	7	–	17	.292	23	–	30	.434
Bradley ‍‍‍	4	–	17	.190	17	–	31	.354
† – Conference champion As of April 17, 2020; Rankings from Baseball America

The 2009 Wichita State Shockers baseball team represented Wichita State University in the 2009 NCAA Division I baseball season. The Shockers played their home games at Eck Stadium under 32nd year coach Gene Stephenson.

== Previous season ==
The Shockers entered the year ranked in the top 25. They started off strong winning their first three games, but were swept in their next series against top 10 ranked Long Beach State. After losing those three games the Shockers would win their next 17 games. Through the season the Shockers were ranked as high as fifth. In the Missouri Valley Conference Tournament they would beat both their opponents and would receive an automatic bid to the NCAA tournament in the Tallahassee Super Regional. Wichita State started in the Stillwater Regional and beat ranked TCU and Oklahoma State. They reached the Super Regional and played against the Florida State Seminoles winning the first, but lost the next two eliminating them from the Tournament.

=== 2008 MLB draft ===
The Shockers had ten players drafted in the 2008 MLB draft.

Player	Position	Round	Overall	MLB Team
Conor Gillaspie	Third baseman	1s	37	San Francisco Giants
Aaron Shafer	Pitcher	2	65	Chicago Cubs
Anthony Capra	Pitcher	4	124	Oakland Athletics
Kenny Williams Jr.	Outfield	6	180	Chicago White Sox
Andy Dirks	Outfield	8	253	Detroit Tigers
Rob Musgrave	Pitcher	14	435	San Diego Padres
Matt Smith	Pitcher	22	667	Los Angeles Dodgers
Dusty Coleman	Shortstop	28	844	Oakland Athletics
Tyler Weber	Catcher	30	913	Detroit Tigers
Josh Workman	Outfield	38	1153	Detroit Tigers

== Roster ==
2008 Wichita State roster
Pitchers: 3 Logan Hoch - Senior; 4 Tyler Fleming - Senior; 11 Jordan Cooper - Freshman; 15 Cameron Maldonado - RS Freshman; 23 Clint Maune - Sophomore; 26 Josh Smith - Freshman; 27 Dalton Banwart -Freshman; 29 Cobey Guy - Junior; 32 Max Hutson - RS Senior; 35 Brian Flynn - Freshman; 36 Tim Kelley - RS Sophomore; 41 Charlie Lowell - Freshman	Catchers: 33 Cody Lassley - RS Junior; Infielders: 6 Remington Johnson - RS Freshman; 7 Taylor Brown - Sophomore; 9 Will Baez - Junior; 12 Tyler Grimes - Freshman; 34 Taylor Gilmore - Junior; Mike Williams - Sophomore; Outfielders: 2 Bret Bascue - RS Junior; 13 Ryan Jones - Junior; 18 Kevin Hall - Sophomore; 20 Mitch Caster - Sophomore; 38 Andrew Letourneau - Freshman	Utility: 8 Josh Rosecrans (UTIL) - Freshman; 14 Ryan Engrav (UTIL) - Sophomore; 16 Grant Muncrief (3B/P) - Sophomore; 17 Justin Kemp (C/P) - Sophomore; 21 Chance Sossamon (3B/P) - Freshman; 22 Chris O'Brien (1B/OF) - Freshman; 25 Johnny Coy (UTIL) - Freshman; 31 Clint McKeever (1B/P) - RS Junior; Source:

== Preseason ==
Valley Preseason Poll
Predicted finish	Team	Votes (1st place)
1	Missouri State	80 (8)
2	Creighton	66
3	Wichita State	63 (1)
4	Southern Illinois	45
5	Bradley	39
6	Indiana State	34
7	Northern Iowa	33
8	Illinois State	28
9	Evansville	17

=== Preseason All-SEC teams ===
The Shockers had one player selected to the preseason all-Valley team.

- Ryan Jones - OF

=== Alumni Game ===
The Alumni Game was played on February 15 between the 2009 team and the Alumni players; such as Derek Schermerhorn (graduated in 2007) and Anthony Capra (Drafted in 2008). The 2009 players won 7–1.

== Schedule and results ==
Legend
	Wichita State win
	Wichita State loss
	Postponement
**Bold**	Wichita State team member

2009 Wichita State Shockers baseball Game Log
Regular season (30–27)

February (3–1)
Date	Opponent	Rank	Site/stadium	Score	Win	Loss	Save	TV	Attendance	Overall record	MVC Record
Feb. 20	vs. Temple		Swanson Stadium • Fort Myers, FL; Florida Gulf Coast Tournament	**W** 8-4	**Kelley** (1-0)	Dan Moller (0-1)				1-0	-
Feb. 21	vs. Florida Gulf Coast		Swanson Stadium • Fort Myers, FL; Florida Gulf Coast Tournament	**W** 6-0	**Lowell** (1-0)					2-0	-
Feb. 22	vs. Central Michigan		Swanson Stadium • Fort Myers, FL; Florida Gulf Coast Tournament	**L** 9-16	Taylor (1-0)	**Cooper** (0-1)				2-1	-
Feb. 27	North Dakota State		Eck Stadium • Wichita, KS	**W** 5-3	**Hutson** (1-0)	Straka (0-1)	**Muncrief** (1)			3-1	-

March (11–9)
Date	Opponent	Rank	Site/stadium	Score	Win	Loss	Save	TV	Attendance	Overall record	MVC Record
Mar. 1	North Dakota State		Eck Stadium • Wichita, KS	**W** 14-5	**Lowell** (2-0)					4-1	-
Mar. 1	North Dakota State		Eck Stadium • Wichita, KS	**W** 9-0	**Cooper** (1-1)					5-1	-
Mar. 2	BYU		Eck Stadium • Wichita, KS	**W** 6-5	**Muncrief** (1-0)	Wortham (0-2)			2,744	6-1	-
Mar. 3	BYU		Eck Stadium • Wichita, KS	**L** 1-3	Oslund (2-0)	**Hutson** (1-1)	Muir (2)			6-2	-
Mar. 6	at No. 11 TCU		Lupton Stadium • Fort Worth, TX	**L** 5-6		**Smith** (0-1)				6-3	-
Mar. 7	at No. 11 TCU		Lupton Stadium • Fort Worth, TX	**L** 4-9		**Lowell** (2-1)				6-4	-
Mar. 8	at No. 11 TCU		Lupton Stadium • Fort Worth, TX	**L** 3-12	Gerrish (1-0)	**Cooper** (1-2)				6-5	-
Mar. 11	Kansas		Eck Stadium • Wichita, KS	**L** 0-8	Ridenhour (3-0)	**Flynn** (0-1)				6-6	-
Mar. 13	No. 10 Pepperdine		Eck Stadium • Wichita, KS	**W** 2-1	**Mucrief** (2-0)					7-6	-
Mar. 14	No. 10 Pepperdine		Eck Stadium • Wichita, KS	**L** 4-7	Cook (4-0)	**Sossamon** (0-1)	Gaudi (3)			7-7	-
Mar. 15	No. 10 Pepperdine		Eck Stadium • Wichita, KS	**W** 3-1	**Cooper** (2-2)	Gates (1-1)	**Smith** (1)		3,844	8-7	-
Mar. 17	Arkansas–Pine Bluff		Eck Stadium • Wichita, KS	**W** 21-1	**Flynn** (1-1)	Newton				9-7	-
Mar. 17	Arkansas–Pine Bluff		Eck Stadium • Wichita, KS	**L** 7-10	Newton	**Banwart** (0-1)	Wyatt			9-8	-
Mar. 18	Arkansas–Pine Bluff		Eck Stadium • Wichita, KS	**W** 5-4	**Sossamon** (1-1)	Varnell (1-1)				10-8	-
Mar. 20	Long Beach State		Eck Stadium • Wichita, KS	**L** 4-6	Wilk	**Kelley** (1-1)	Ruiz (1)			10-9	-
Mar. 21	Long Beach State		Eck Stadium • Wichita, KS	**W** 7-5	**Lowell** (3-1)	Thompson (0-4)	**Sossamon** (1)			11-9	-
Mar. 22	Long Beach State		Eck Stadium • Wichita, KS	**W** 6-1	**Cooper** (3-2)	Gagnon (1-2)				12-9	-
Mar. 24	Oral Roberts		Eck Stadium • Wichita, KS	**L** 3-5^{12}	Kelly (1-0)	**Kemp** (0-1)				12-10	-
Mar. 27	at Bradley		Dozer Park • Peoria, IL	**W** 5-2	**Kelley** (2-1)	Altbach (1-3)				13-10	1-0
Mar. 31	Nebraska		Eck Stadium • Wichita, KS	**W** 9-7	**Cooper** (4-2)			Kansas 22		14-10	-

April (9–10)
Date	Opponent	Rank	Site/stadium	Score	Win	Loss	Save	TV	Attendance	Overall record	MVC Record
Apr. 1	Kansas Wesleyan		Eck Stadium • Wichita, KS	**W** 11-5	**Johnson** (1-0)					15-10	-
Apr. 3	Illinois State		Eck Stadium • Wichita, KS	**L** 4-5		**Kelley** (2-2)				15-11	1-1
Apr. 4	Illinois State		Eck Stadium • Wichita, KS	**W** 10-5	**Lowell** (4-1)	Copeland (2-3)				16-11	2-1
Apr. 5	Illinois State		Eck Stadium • Wichita, KS	**W** 5-0	**Cooper** (5-2)	Maines (5-2)				17-11	3-1
Apr. 7	Saint Mary		Eck Stadium • Wichita, KS	**W** 7-2	**Maldonado** (1-0)	Martin (2-3)			2,806	18-11	-
Apr. 8	No. 11 Oklahoma		Eck Stadium • Wichita, KS	**L** 0-15		**Flynn** (1-2)			5,186	18-12	-
Apr. 10	Evansville		Eck Stadium • Wichita, KS	**W** 6-2	**Kelley** (3-2)	Kapteyn (2-5)				19-12	4-1
Apr. 11	Evansville		Eck Stadium • Wichita, KS	**W** 6-1	**Lowell** (5-1)	Foley (3-2)				20-12	5-1
Apr. 11	Evansville		Eck Stadium • Wichita, KS	**L** 3-5	Keegan (1-2)	**Cooper** (5-3)				20-13	5-2
Apr. 14	at No. 21 Kansas State		Frank Myers Field at Tointon Family Stadium • Manhattan, KS	**L** 5-13	Marshall (1-2)	**Maldonado** (1-1)		Kansas 22		20-14	-
Apr. 15	No. 21 Kansas State		Eck Stadium • Wichita, KS	**L** 3-4	Ryan (2-1)	**Flynn** (1-3)			5,586	20-15	-
Apr. 17	at Missouri State		Hammons Field • Springfield, MO	**L** 2-8	Clubb (4-2)	**Kelley** (3-3)		Kansas 22		20-16	5-3
Apr. 18	at Missouri State		Hammons Field • Springfield, MO	**L** 8-12	Doyle (2-2)	**Kemp** (0-2)		Kansas 22		20-17	5-4
Apr. 19	at Missouri State		Hammons Field • Springfield, MO	**L** 0-2	Meade (6-2)	**Cooper** (5-4)				20-18	5-5
Apr. 21	No. 25 Oklahoma State		Eck Stadium • Wichita, KS	**L** 1-4		**Flynn**(1-4)				20-19	-
Apr. 22	at No. 13 Oklahoma		L. Dale Mitchell Baseball Park • Norman, OK	**L** 1-8		**Smith** (0-2)		Kansas 22		20-20	-
Apr. 24	Northern Iowa		Riverfront Stadium • Cedar Falls, IA	**W** 10-7	**Johnson** (2-0)		**Sossamon** (2)			21-20	6-5
Apr. 25	Northern Iowa		Riverfront Stadium • Cedar Falls, IA	**W** 6-3	**Cooper** (6-4)		**Kemp** (1)			22-20	7-5
Apr. 28	Tabor College		Eck Stadium • Wichita, KS	**W** 5-3	**Maune** (1-0)	Zewe (2-5)				23-20	-

May (4–4)
Date	Opponent	Rank	Site/stadium	Score	Win	Loss	Save	TV	Attendance	Overall record	MVC Record
May 1	Indiana State		Eck Stadium • Wichita, KS	**W** 2-0	**Kelley** (4-3)					24-20	8-5
May 2	Indiana State		Eck Stadium • Wichita, KS	**L** 4-9		**Cooper** (6-5)				24-21	8-6
May 3	Indiana State		Eck Stadium • Wichita, KS	**L** 3-5	Rodriguez (6-1)	**Lowell** (5-2)	Shelton (5)			24-22	8-7
May 5	Oral Roberts		Eck Stadium • Wichita, KS	**L** 6-7^{13}		**Maune** (1-1)				24-23	-
May 6	No. 23 Kansas		Eck Stadium • Wichita, KS	**L** 3-8		**Flynn** (1-5)		Kansas 22		24-24	-
May 9	at Southern Illinois		Abe Martin Field • Carbondale, IL							24-24	
May 9	at Southern Illinois		Abe Martin Field • Carbondale, IL							24-24	
May 1	at Southern Illinois		Abe Martin Field • Carbondale, IL							24-24	
May 14	Creighton		Eck Stadium • Wichita, KS	**W** 4-1	**Kelley** (5-3)	Hauer (1-6)				25-24	9-7
May 16	Creighton		Eck Stadium • Wichita, KS	**W** 5-2	**Lowell** (6-2)	Dufek (4-7)	**Johnson** (1)			26-24	10-7
May 16	Creighton		Eck Stadium • Wichita, KS	**W** 11-1^{7}	**Cooper** (7-5)	Hellhake (5-3)				27-24	11-7

Postseason (3–3)

State Farm Missouri Valley Conference Tournament (3–1)
Date	Opponent	Rank	Site/stadium	Score	Win	Loss	Save	TV	Attendance	Overall record	MVC Record
May	(2) Indiana State	(3)	Eck Stadium • Wichita, KS	**W** 15-7	**Johnson** (3-0)	Manus (2-2)			3,864	28-24	
May	(4) Creighton	(3)	Eck Stadium • Wichita, KS	**L** 0-11^{7}	Koenigstein (5-0)	**Hutson** (1-2)			3,983	28-25	
May	(6) Illinois State	(3)	Eck Stadium • Wichita, KS	**W** 4-0	**Cooper** (8-5)	Maines(6-5)			4,061	29-25	
May	(4) Creighton	(3)	Eck Stadium • Wichita, KS	**W** 4-2	**Flynn** (2-5)	VanLeur (3-4)	**Sossamon** (3)		4,904	30-25	

2009 NCAA tournament (0–2)
Date	Opponent	Rank	Site/stadium	Score	Win	Loss	Save	TV	Attendance	Overall record	MVC Record
May	(1) No. 9 Oklahoma	(4)	L. Dale Mitchell Baseball Park • Norman, OK	**L** 4-5	Anderson (3-1)	**Kelley** (5-4)				30-26	
May	(3) No. 24 Washington State	(4)	L. Dale Mitchell Baseball Park • Norman, OK	**L** 2-3	Arnold (8-3)	**Cooper** (8-6)	Johnson (10)			30-27	

=== 2009 Missouri Valley All Tournament Team ===
- Cody Lassley - Catcher
- Chance Sossamon - Utility
- Ryan Jones - Designated Hitter
- Ryan Engrav - Outfield
- Jordan Cooper - Pitcher

MVP - Ryan Engrav
