= Grue (surname) =

Grue, used as a surname, may refer to:

- Francesco Grue (1618–1673), Italian potter and painter
- Francesco Antonio Xaverio Grue (1686–1746), Italian potter and painter; son of Francesco
- Joe Grue (born ?), American bridge player
- John Grue (born 1957), Norwegian mathematician
- David Grue (born March 11, 1986), American mathematics teacher
