= 2009 NCAA Division I baseball tournament =

American college baseball championship

- Season: 2009
- Teams: 64
- Finals site: Johnny Rosenblatt Stadium; Omaha, Nebraska
- Champions: LSU (6th title)
- Runner-up: Texas (33rd CWS Appearance)
- Winning coach: Paul Mainieri (1st title)
- MOP: Jared Mitchell (LSU)

The 2009 NCAA Division I baseball tournament was held from May 29 through June 24, 2009 and is part of the 2009 NCAA Division I baseball season. The 64 NCAA Division I college baseball teams were selected out of an eligible 286 teams on May 25, 2009. Thirty teams were awarded an automatic bid as champions of their conference, and 34 teams were selected at-large by the NCAA Division I Baseball Committee.

The 2009 tournament culminated with 8 teams advancing to the College World Series at historic Rosenblatt Stadium in Omaha, Nebraska, beginning on June 13.

== Bids ==
=== Automatic bids ===
Conference champions from 30 Division I conferences earned automatic bids to regionals. The remaining 34 spots were awarded to schools as at-large invitees.

School	Conference	Record (Conf)	Berth	Last NCAA appearance
Binghamton	America East	29–20 (13–7)	Won America East Tourney	First appearance
Virginia	ACC	43–12–1 (16–11–1)	Won ACC Tourney	2008 (Fullerton Regional)
Jacksonville	A-Sun	35–20 (19–11)	Won A-Sun Tourney	2007 (Chapel Hill Regional)
Xavier	Atlantic 10	37–19 (18–9)	Won A-10 Tourney	First appearance
Louisville	Big East	44–15 (19–7)	Won Big East Tourney	2008 (Athens Regional)
Coastal Carolina	Big South	46–14 (21–5)	Won Big South Tourney	2008 (Cary Super Regional)
Indiana	Big Ten	32–25 (16–7)	Won Big Ten Tourney	1996 (Midwest Regional)
Texas	Big 12	41–13–1 (17–9–1)	Won Big 12 Tourney	2008 (Houston Regional)
UC Irvine	Big West	43–13 (22–2)	Won Big West	2008 (Baton Rouge Super Regional)
Georgia State	Colonial Athletic	39–20 (12–9)	Won CAA Tourney	First appearance
Rice	Conference USA	39–15 (16–8)	Won C-USA Tourney	2008 (College World Series)
Wright State	Horizon	33–28 (14–12)	Won Horizon Tourney	2006 (Corvallis Regional)
Dartmouth	Ivy League	27–16 (16–4)	Won Ivy championship series	1987 (Northeast Regional)
Marist	Metro Atlantic	31–26 (15–9)	Won MAAC Tourney	2005 (Baton Rouge Regional)
Kent State	Mid-American	42–15 (17–9)	Won MAC Tourney	2007 (Columbia, Missouri Regional)
Bethune–Cookman	MEAC	32–26 (16–2)	Won MEAC Tourney	2008 (Coral Gables Regional)
Wichita State	Missouri Valley	30–25 (11–7)	Won MVC Tourney	2008 (Stillwater Regional)
Utah	Mountain West	26–29 (8–16)	Won MWC Tourney	1960 (District 7)
Monmouth	Northeast	32–23 (15–11)	Won NEC Tourney	2007 (Tempe Regional)
Tennessee Tech	Ohio Valley	30–22 (10–11)	Won OVC Tourney	2001 (Knoxville Regional)
Arizona State	Pacific-10	44–12 (21–6)	Won Pac-10	2008 (Tempe Super Regional)
Army	Patriot League	31–18 (13–7)	Won Patriot Tourney	2005 (Tallahassee Regional)
LSU	SEC	46–16 (20–10)	Won SEC tournament	2008 (College World Series)
Georgia Southern	Southern	42–15 (20–8)	Won SoCon Tourney	2002 (Clemson Regional)
Sam Houston State	Southland	36–22 (18–14)	Won Southland Tourney	2008 (Houston Regional)
Oral Roberts	Summit	31–13 (16–2)	Won Summit Tourney	2008 (Baton Rouge Regional)
Middle Tennessee	Sun Belt	43–16 (21–8)	Won SBC Tourney	2003 (Starkville Regional)
Southern	SWAC	30–15 (17–6)	Won SWAC Tourney	2005 (New Orleans Regional)
Fresno State	WAC	32–28 (12–12)	Won WAC Tourney	2008 (College World Series)
Gonzaga	WCC	35–16 (14–7)	Won WCC championship series	1981 (West Regional)

=== Bids by conference ===
Conference	Total	Schools
Big 12	8	Baylor, Kansas, Kansas State, Missouri, Oklahoma, Oklahoma State, Texas, Texas A&M
Southeastern	8	Alabama, Arkansas, Florida, Georgia, LSU, Ole Miss, South Carolina, Vanderbilt
Atlantic Coast	7	Boston College, Clemson, Florida State, Georgia Tech, Miami (FL), North Carolina, Virginia
Big Ten	3	Indiana, Minnesota, Ohio State
Big West	3	Cal Poly, UC Irvine, Cal State Fullerton
Conference USA	3	East Carolina, Rice, Southern Miss
Mountain West	3	San Diego State, TCU, Utah
Pacific 10	3	Arizona State, Oregon State, Washington State
Colonial	2	George Mason, Georgia State
Southern	2	Elon, Georgia Southern
Southland	2	Sam Houston State, Texas State
Sun Belt	2	Middle Tennessee, Western Kentucky
Atlantic Sun	1	Jacksonville
Atlantic 10	1	Xavier
America East	1	Binghamton
Big East	1	Louisville
Big South	1	Coastal Carolina
Horizon	1	Wright State
Ivy	1	Dartmouth
Metro Atlantic	1	Marist
Mid-American	1	Kent State
Mid-Eastern	1	Bethune–Cookman
Missouri Valley	1	Wichita State
Northeast	1	Monmouth
Ohio Valley	1	Tennessee Tech
Patriot	1	Army
Southwestern	1	Southern
Summit	1	Oral Roberts
Western Athletic	1	Fresno State
WCC	1	Gonzaga

== National seeds ==
Bold indicates CWS participant.

1. **Texas (41-13-1)**
2. **Cal State Fullerton (42–14)**
3. **LSU (46–16)**
4. **North Carolina (42–16)**
5. **Arizona State (44–12)**
6. UC Irvine (43–13)
7. Oklahoma (41–18)
8. Florida (42-22)

== Regionals and super regionals ==
=== Regional schedule ===
Regional rounds were held Friday, May 29 through Monday, June 1. Each regional followed a double elimination format, with 2 games each played on Friday, Saturday, and Sunday, and one on Monday when needed.

Day	Game	Teams
Fri. 5/29/09	1	2/3 or 1/4 (host choice)
Fri. 5/29/09	2	2/3 or 1/4 (host choice)
Sat. 5/30/09	3	Loser Games 1 & 2
Sat. 5/30/09	4	Winner Games 1 & 2
Sun. 5/31/09	5	Winner Game 3 vs Loser Game 4
Sun. 5/31/09	6	Winner Games 4 & 5
Mon. 6/1/09	7	if needed, only if winner of game 5 wins game 6

=== Super Regional Schedule ===
Best-of-three super regionals were held Friday, June 5 through Monday, June 8. Four series were played Friday-Sunday and four series were played Saturday-Monday with the final day in each grouping if necessary.

=== Brackets ===
Bold indicates winner. * indicates extra innings.

==== Austin Super Regional ====
Hosted by Texas at UFCU Disch–Falk Field

Regional	Regional
1	**Texas**	**3**
4	Army	1
1	**Texas**	**3**^{25 (Note: The second round game between Texas and Boston College went 25 innings, the longest game in NCAA History.)}
3	Boston College	2
3	**Boston College**	**8**
2	Texas State	7
Austin Regional – UFCU Disch–Falk Field
4	**Army**	**7**
2	Texas State	4
4	**Army**	**4**
3	Boston College	3
1	**TCU**	**6**
4	Wright State	3
1	**TCU**	**13**
3	Oregon State	1
3	**Oregon State**	**9**
2	Texas A&M	8
Fort Worth Regional – Lupton Stadium
4	Wright State	4
2	**Texas A&M**	**6**^{11}
2	Texas A&M	6
3	**Oregon State**	**13**

Regional finals
1	**Texas**	**14**	—
4	Army	10	—
1	**TCU**	**5**	—
3	Oregon State	4	—

Super regionals
1	**Texas**	**10**	2	**5**
TCU	4	**3**	2

==== Gainesville Super Regional ====
Hosted by Florida at Alfred A. McKethan Stadium

Regional	Regional
1	**Florida**	**8**
4	Bethune–Cookman	7
1	**Florida**	**8**
2	Miami (FL)	2
3	Jacksonville	4
2	**Miami (FL)**	**9**
Gainesville Regional – Alfred A. McKethan Stadium
4	Bethune–Cookman	7
3	**Jacksonville**	**8**
3	Jacksonville	0
2	**Miami (FL)**	**4**
1	**Georgia Tech**	**9**
4	Georgia State	3
1	Georgia Tech	7
3	**Southern Miss**	**10**
3	**Southern Miss**	**17**
2	Elon	15
Atlanta Regional – Russ Chandler Stadium
4	Georgia State	3
2	**Elon**	**4**
2	Elon	4
1	**Georgia Tech**	**8**

Regional finals
1	**Florida**	**16**	—
2	Miami (FL)	5	—
3	**Southern Miss**	3	**12**
1	Georgia Tech	**10**	8

Super regionals
8	Florida	7	6	—
**Southern Miss**	**9**	**7**	—

==== Tempe Super Regional ====
Hosted by Arizona State at Packard Stadium

Regional	Regional
1	**Arizona State**	**17**
4	Kent State	6
1	**Arizona State**	**4**
2	Oral Roberts	1
3	Cal Poly	3
2	**Oral Roberts**	**13**
Tempe Regional – Packard Stadium
4	**Kent State**	**10**
3	Cal Poly	9
4	Kent State	10
2	**Oral Roberts**	**15**
1	**Clemson**	**5**
4	Tennessee Tech	4
1	Clemson	2
3	**Oklahoma State**	**3**
3	**Oklahoma State**	**10**
2	Alabama	6
Clemson Regional – Doug Kingsmore Stadium
4	**Tennessee Tech**	**6**
2	Alabama	2
4	Tennessee Tech	0
1	**Clemson**	**10**

Regional finals
1	**Arizona State**	**8**	—
2	Oral Roberts	3	—
3	Oklahoma State	1	5
1	**Clemson**	**15**	**6**

Super regionals
5	**Arizona State**	**7**	**8**	—
Clemson	4	2	—

==== Chapel Hill Super Regional ====
Hosted by North Carolina at Boshamer Stadium

Regional	Regional
1	**North Carolina**	**5**
4	Dartmouth	2
1	**North Carolina**	**14**
2	Coastal Carolina	5
3	Kansas	3
2	**Coastal Carolina**	**11**
Chapel Hill Regional – Boshamer Stadium
4	Dartmouth	0
3	**Kansas**	**16**
3	**Kansas**	**5**
2	Coastal Carolina	1
1	**East Carolina**	**11**
4	Binghamton	7
1	East Carolina	2
2	**South Carolina**	**12**
3	George Mason	3
2	**South Carolina**	**11**
Greenville Regional – Clark-LeClair Stadium
4	**Binghamton**	**11**
3	George Mason	6
4	Binghamton	9
1	**East Carolina**	**16**

Regional finals
1	**North Carolina**	**12**	—
3	Kansas	1	—
2	South Carolina	6	9
1	**East Carolina**	**8**	**10**^{10}

Super regionals
4	**North Carolina**	**10**	**9**	—
East Carolina	1	3	—

==== Fullerton Super Regional ====
Hosted by Cal State Fullerton at Goodwin Field

Regional	Regional
1	**Cal State Fullerton**	**18**
4	Utah	2
1	**Cal State Fullerton**	**7**
3	Gonzaga	4
3	**Gonzaga**	**19**
2	Georgia Southern	10
Fullerton Regional – Goodwin Field
4	**Utah**	**11**
2	Georgia Southern	10
4	**Utah**	**9**
3	Gonzaga	7
1	**Louisville**	**8**
4	Indiana	2
1	**Louisville**	**3**
2	Middle Tennessee	2
3	Vanderbilt	4
2	**Middle Tennessee**	**5**
Louisville Regional – Jim Patterson Stadium
4	Indiana	0
3	**Vanderbilt**	**10**
3	**Vanderbilt**	**6**
2	Middle Tennessee	0

Regional finals
1	**Cal State Fullerton**	**16**	—
4	Utah	3	—
1	**Louisville**	4	**5**
3	Vanderbilt	**8**	3

Super regionals
2	**Cal State Fullerton**	**12**	**11**	—
Louisville	0	2	—

==== Tallahassee Super Regional ====
Hosted by Florida State at Dick Howser Stadium

Regional	Regional
1	**Oklahoma**	**5**
4	Wichita State	4
1	Oklahoma	6
2	**Arkansas**	**17**
3	Washington State	3
2	**Arkansas**	**10**
Norman Regional – L. Dale Mitchell Baseball Park
4	Wichita State	2
3	**Washington State**	**3**
3	Washington State	2
1	**Oklahoma**	**7**
1	**Florida State**	**16**
4	Marist	4
1	**Florida State**	**8**
2	Georgia	2
3	Ohio State	8
2	**Georgia**	**24**
Tallahassee Regional – Dick Howser Stadium
4	Marist	4
3	**Ohio State**	**6**
3	**Ohio State**	**13**
2	Georgia	6

Regional finals
2	**Arkansas**	**11**	—
1	Oklahoma	0	—
1	**Florida State**	**37** (Note: The 37 runs scored by Florida State in the Tallahassee Regional championship were the most scored by a team in NCAA tournament history.)	—
3	Ohio State	6	—

Super regionals
**Arkansas**	**7**	**9**	—
Florida State	2	8	—

==== Oxford Super Regional ====
Hosted by Ole Miss at Swayze Field

Regional	Regional
1	**UC Irvine**	**4**
4	Fresno State	2
1	UC Irvine	0
2	**Virginia**	**5**
3	San Diego State	1
2	**Virginia**	**5**
Irvine Regional – Anteater Ballpark
4	Fresno State	1
3	**San Diego State**	**4**
3	San Diego State	3
1	**UC Irvine**	**14**
1	**Ole Miss**	**8**
4	Monmouth	1
1	**Ole Miss**	**7**
3	Western Kentucky	4
3	**Western Kentucky**	**11**
2	Missouri	5
Oxford Regional – Swayze Field
4	Monmouth	0
2	**Missouri**	**9**
2	Missouri	6
3	**Western Kentucky**	**11**

Regional finals
2	**Virginia**	**4**	—
1	UC Irvine	1	—
1	**Ole Miss**	9	**4**
3	Western Kentucky	**10**	1

Super regionals
**Virginia**	3	**4**	**5**
Ole Miss	**4**	3	1

==== Baton Rouge Super Regional ====
Hosted by LSU at Alex Box Stadium

Regional	Regional
1	**LSU**	**10**
4	Southern	2
1	**LSU**	**3**
3	Baylor	2
3	**Baylor**	**5**
2	Minnesota	0
Baton Rouge Regional – Alex Box Stadium
4	Southern	8
2	**Minnesota**	**11**
2	**Minnesota**	**15**
3	Baylor	12
1	**Rice**	**5**
4	Sam Houston State	2
1	Rice	6
2	**Kansas State**	**7**
3	Xavier	8
2	**Kansas State**	**16**
Houston Regional – Reckling Park
4	Sam Houston State	6
3	**Xavier**	**9**
3	Xavier	7
1	**Rice**	**12**

Regional finals
1	**LSU**	**10**	—
2	Minnesota	3	—
2	Kansas State	0	4
1	**Rice**	**8**	**13**

Super regionals
3	**LSU**	**12**	**5**	—
Rice	9	3	—

== College World Series ==
=== Participants ===
School	Conference	Record (conference)	Head coach	CWS appearances	Best CWS finish	CWS record Not including this year
Arizona State	Pac-10	49–12 (21–6)	Pat Murphy	20 (last: 2007)	1st (1965, 1967, 1969, 1977, 1981)	59–34
Arkansas	SEC	39–22 (14–15)	Dave van Horn	5 (last: 2004)	2nd (1979)	7–10
Cal State Fullerton	Big West	47–14 (17–7)	Dave Serrano	15 (last: 2007)	1st (1979, 1984, 1995, 2004)	34–25
LSU	SEC	51–16 (20–10)	Paul Mainieri	14 (last: 2008)	1st (1991, 1993, 1996, 1997, 2000)	30–19
North Carolina	ACC	47–16 (19–10)	Mike Fox	7 (last: 2008)	2nd (2006, 2007)	13–15
Southern Miss	C-USA	40–24 (12–12)	Corky Palmer	0 (last: none)	none	0–0
Texas	Big 12	46–14–1 (17–9–1)	Augie Garrido	32 (last: 2005)	1st (1949, 1950, 1975, 1983, 2002, 2005)	78–53
Virginia	ACC	48–13–1 (16–11–1)	Brian O'Connor	0 (last: none)	none	0–0

=== Bracket ===
First round
2	Cal State Fullerton	6
**Arkansas**	**10**
Virginia	5
3	**LSU**	**9**
2	Cal State Fullerton	5
**Virginia**	**7**
1	**Texas**	**7**
Southern Miss	6
5	**Arizona State**	**5***
4	North Carolina	2*
Southern Miss	4
4	**North Carolina**	**11**

Second round
Arkansas	1
3	**LSU**	**9**
Virginia	3*
**Arkansas**	**4***
1	**Texas**	**10**
5	Arizona State	6
4	North Carolina	5
5	**Arizona State**	**12**

Semifinals
3	**LSU**	**14**	-
Arkansas	5	-
1	**Texas**	**4**	-
5	Arizona State	3	-

Finals
3	**LSU**	**7**^{11}	1	**11**
1	Texas	6	**5**	4

=== Championship series ===
==== Game 1 ====
Monday, June 22 6:00 pm Omaha, Nebraska ESPN
Team	1	2	3	4	5	6	7	8	9	10	11	R	H	E
**LSU**	1	0	0	0	0	2	1	0	2	0	1	**7**	**11**	**0**
Texas	0	0	0	3	0	2	1	0	0	0	0	**6**	**9**	**1**
WP: Matty Ott LP: Brandon Workman; Attendance: 23,019; Notes: First time since 2003 that a MCWS Final Series game went into extra innings.

==== Game 2 ====
Tuesday, June 23 6:00 pm Omaha, Nebraska ESPN
Team	1	2	3	4	5	6	7	8	9	R	H	E
**Texas**	1	1	3	0	0	0	0	0	0	**5**	**12**	**3**
LSU	0	1	0	0	0	0	0	0	0	**1**	**5**	**2**
WP: Taylor Jungmann LP: Austin Ross; Attendance: 21,871

==== Game 3 ====
Wednesday, June 24 6:00 pm Omaha, Nebraska ESPN
Team	1	2	3	4	5	6	7	8	9	R	H	E
**LSU**	3	1	0	0	0	5	0	1	1	**11**	**12**	**0**
Texas	0	0	2	0	2	0	0	0	0	**4**	**9**	**1**
WP: Anthony Ranaudo LP: Brandon Workman; Attendance: 19,986; Notes: LSU wins its 6th College World Series. LSU coach Paul Mainieri wins the first national championship of his career.

=== All-Tournament Team ===
The following players were members of the College World Series All-Tournament Team.

P	Taylor Jungmann	Texas
P	Anthony Ranaudo	LSU
C	Cameron Rupp	Texas
1B	Dustin Ackley	North Carolina
2B	DJ LeMahieu	LSU
3B	Kyle Seager	North Carolina
SS	Tyler Cannon	Virginia
OF	**Jared Mitchell (MOP)**	LSU
OF	Ryan Schimpf	LSU
OF	Kole Calhoun	Arizona State
DH	Russell Moldenhauer	Texas

== Record by conference ==
Conference	# of Bids	Record	Win %	RF	SR	WS	NS	CS	NC
Southeastern	8	30–16	.652	6	4	2	2	1	1
Big 12	8	20–17	.541	5	1	1	1	1	–
Pac-10	3	10–6	.625	2	1	1	1	–	–
Atlantic Coast	7	25–16	.610	6	4	2	–	–	–
Conference USA	3	13–9	.591	3	3	1	–	–	–
Big West	3	7–6	.538	2	1	1	–	–	–
Mountain West	3	7–6	.538	2	1	–	–	–	–
Big East	1	3–3	.500	1	1	–	–	–	–
Big Ten	3	4–6	.400	2	–	–	–	–	–
Sun Belt	2	4–4	.500	1	–	–	–	–	–
Southern	2	1–4	.200	–	–	–	–	–	–
Colonial	2	0–4	.000	–	–	–	–	–	–
Southland	2	0–4	.000	–	–	–	–	–	–
Other	17	11–34	.244	2	–	–	–	–	–

The columns RF, SR, WS, NS, CS, and NC respectively stand for the regional finals, super regionals, College World Series, national semifinals, championship series, and national champion.

== Tournament notes ==
=== Round 1 ===
- All 16 No. 1 seeds won their first-round games for the second time since the tournament expanded to 64 teams in 1999; thus no No. 4 was able to win their first-round game.
- Seven No. 3 seeds won their first-round games in upsets.

=== Round 2 ===
- Fresno State, the champions of the 2008 NCAA College World Series, was eliminated in the Irvine Regional after losing to UC Irvine and San Diego State.
- Texas defeated Boston College 3–2 in 25 innings, which broke the record of the longest game in NCAA baseball history lasting more than seven hours.
- Two National-seeds lost in round two: #6 UC Irvine and #7 Oklahoma.
- Four No. 2 seeds advanced to the Regional finals with a 2–0 record.
- Three No. 2 seeds (Alabama, Georgia Southern and Texas State) were eliminated from the tournament after going 0–2.
- Two No. 3 seeds (Southern Miss and Oklahoma State) advanced to the Regional finals with a 2–0 record.
- Five No. 4 seeds registered a win in their opening game in the losers bracket.

=== Regional finals ===
- Florida State sets NCAA postseason records with 37 runs, 38 hits and 66 total bases in a blowout win over Ohio State, 37–6.
- Two No. 4 seeds advanced to the Regional finals: Army and Utah.
- Two National-seeds failed to advance to the Super regionals: #6 UC Irvine and #7 Oklahoma.
- The only non-No. 1 seeds to advance to the Super regionals were Arkansas, Southern Miss, and Virginia.
- No team which lost its opening round game was able to come back and win its Regional. Vanderbilt, the No. 3 seed in the Louisville Regional, was the only team to lose its opener and come back to force a decisive second game in the regional final. The Commodores lost to No. 2 seed Middle Tennessee in the opening round before winning three consecutive elimination games against No. 4 seed Indiana, a rematch with MT and host Louisville before falling to the Cardinals the next night.

=== Super regionals ===
- No. 2 seed Arkansas, No. 2 seed Virginia, and No. 3 seed Southern Miss became the ninth, tenth, and eleventh teams respectively in NCAA history to advance to the College World Series without playing a game at their home park.
- Arkansas became the third team since the tournament expanded in 1999 to reach the CWS by going undefeated (5–0) on the road in both Regionals and Super regionals, joining Southern California in 2000 and UC Irvine in 2007.
- No. 2 seed Virginia advanced to the first College World Series in school history by winning the Oxford Super Regional 2–1.
- No. 3 seed Southern Miss advanced to the first College World Series in school history by winning the Gainesville Super Regional 2–0.
- Three of the 8 national seeds failed to make it to the CWS.

=== College World Series ===
- 2009 was the 17th consecutive year the SEC fielded a team in the CWS.
- Both Virginia and Southern Miss played in their first College World Series in school history.
- Only two teams from the 2008 CWS, LSU and North Carolina, returned for 2009.
- 2009 marked the first time in six seasons that a top-eight national seed won the title.
- LSU played for the championship for the first time since 2000, and it was the first time LSU has appeared in the best of 3 championship series.

==== CWS records broken ====
- All-time hits by a player: 28 by Dustin Ackley of UNC, broken against Southern Miss in game 7
- Pitchers used in a single game by one team (tied): 8 by Arkansas in game 11
- Pitchers used in a single game by both teams (tied): 13 by LSU and Arkansas in game 11
- Career games played: 21 by Garrett Gore of North Carolina, broken against Arizona St. in game 10
- Most wild pitches in a single-game: 4 by Matt Harvey of North Carolina, broken against Arizona St. in game 10
- Home runs in a College World Series: 4 by Russell Moldenhauer of Texas, tied the record against LSU in game 2 of the finals.
- Attendance Record: 336,076, previous record set in 2008 of 330,099
- Combined home runs in the Championship Finals: 12, previous record of 9 set in 2008.

== Television/radio/online coverage ==
=== Regionals ===
- ESPNU broadcast every game from both the Tallahassee and Irvine Regionals.
- Comcast/Charter Sports Southeast broadcast every game from the Clemson Regional.
- Cox Sports (Louisiana) broadcast every game from the Baton Rouge Regional.
- Sun Sports broadcast selected games from the Gainesville Regional.

=== Super regionals ===
- All super-regional games were shown on ESPN, ESPN2 or ESPNU on television and ESPN360 through online streaming video.

=== College World Series ===
- All College World Series games were shown on ESPN, ESPN2 or ESPNU on television and ESPN360 through online streaming video.

== See also ==
- 2009 NCAA Division II baseball tournament
- 2009 NCAA Division III baseball tournament
- 2009 NAIA World Series
