= Constance Grewe =

German-French academic and former judge

- Born: December 14, 1946 (age 79); Stuttgart
- Education: University of Caen (PhD)
- Occupations: Academic, author, judge
- Parent: Wilhelm Grewe (father)

Constance Grewe (born 14 December 1946 in Stuttgart) is a German-French academic, and former judge of the Constitutional Court of Bosnia and Herzegovina. She is Professor Emeritus at the University of Strasbourg.

== Biography ==
Constance Grewe is the daughter of the German professor of international law and diplomat Wilhelm Grewe.

Grewe earned her bachelor's degree at Frankfurt in 1966 and completed her studies in law in Giessen, Germany until 1967 and in France at the Faculty of Law in Caen from 1967 until 1974. She became a French citizen in 1969. In 1979 she obtained her Ph.D. at the University of Caen with a thesis on Germany's cooperative federalism. From 1981 to 1983 she was professor at the University of Chambéry and from 1983 to 1997 professor at the University of Caen. She was responsible for the Fundamental Rights Research Department. Since 1997 she has been professor at the University Robert Schumann of Strasbourg. In the period from 1998 to 2000, she was director of the Institute of Comparative Law. She is a member of the Institut de recherche Carré de Malberg (IRCM) and was the Head of IRCM.

She published a number of books and scientific articles from the field of Comparative Constitutional Law, German Constitutional Law and interactions between international and internal law.

She was a member of the Scientific Council of the University of Caen until 1997. Since 1997 she has been a member of the Scientific Council of the University Robert Schumann of Strasbourg. She was a vice president in charge of research.

In addition she was a member of the executive committee of the Association française des constitutionnalistes (AFDC) and of the Societas iuris publici europaei (SIPE). She was also a member of the Editorial Advisory Board of the Law Journal EuGRZ (Europäische Grundrechte Zeitschrift) and an expert at the Council of Europe.

On 24 May 2004, she was appointed international judge at the Constitutional Court of Bosnia and Herzegovina by the President of the European Court of Human Rights. She served until age 70 in 2016.

== Awards and honors ==
- 2008: Gay-Lussac-Humboldt-Prize
- 2012: Honorary doctorate from the University of Basel
- 2012: Officer of the Legion of Honor
