= Jared Mitchell (baseball) =

American baseball player (born 1988)

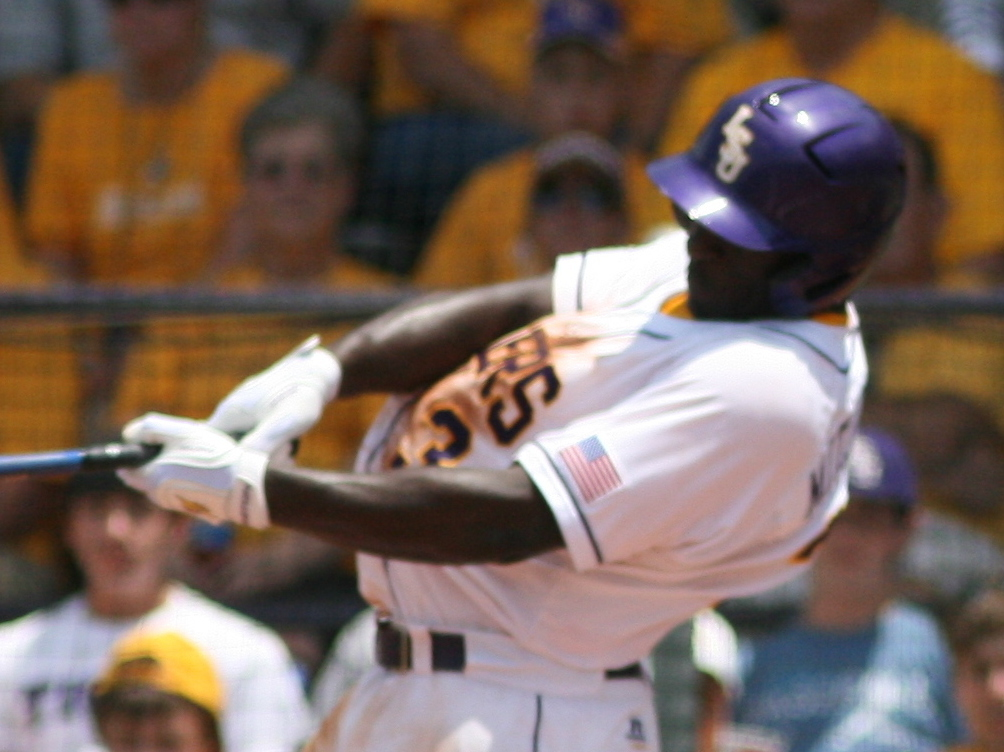
- Mitchell with the LSU Tigers
- Outfielder
- Born: October 13, 1988 (age 37); New Iberia, Louisiana, U.S.
- Bats: Left Throws: Left
- Stats at Baseball Reference

Career highlights and awards
- College World Series Most Outstanding Player (2009)

Jared Christopher Mitchell (born October 13, 1988) is an American former professional baseball outfielder and current analyst. He was drafted by the Chicago White Sox in the first round of the 2009 Major League Baseball draft. He played college baseball at LSU, where he was the College World Series Most Outstanding Player in 2009.

== Amateur career ==
Mitchell attended Westgate High School. He was ranked as a top prospect in the 2006 MLB draft out of high school by Baseball America and Perfect Game.

Mitchell turned down a $700,000 signing bonus from the Minnesota Twins in order to attend Louisiana State University (LSU) after being selected by the club in the 10th round of the 2006 Major League Baseball draft.

"They came at me hard but kept [the offer] around the same as the original," Mitchell said. "I had a number in my head, and they never got there. It's a great organization; things just didn't work out when we had a chance to do something. Who knows what will happen three years down the line?"

Mitchell played for both the LSU Tigers baseball team and football team. He was awarded the College World Series Most Outstanding Player as his team won the 2009 College World Series. He also played on the 2007 LSU BCS National Championship football team as a wide receiver. He is a rare two-sport college national champion, along with LSU baseball and football teammate Chad Jones. In 2008, he played summer baseball with the Yarmouth–Dennis Red Sox of the Cape Cod Baseball League.

== Professional career ==
=== Chicago White Sox ===
Mitchell was drafted in the first round (23rd overall) of the 2009 Major League Baseball draft by the Chicago White Sox. White Sox scouting director Doug Laumann was familiar with Mitchell because he played the previous two summers in an amateur league near Laumann's Cincinnati-area residence. He began his professional career with the Single-A Kannapolis Intimidators. He finished the season with a .296 batting average, 12 doubles, two triples, 10 runs batted in, 5 stolen bases, 23 walks, and 40 strikeouts in 139 plate appearances.

On March 16, 2010, Mitchell underwent surgery to repair the tear of a tendon in his left ankle. He missed the entire season. He returned to play in 2011 for the High-A Winston-Salem Dash. He finished the 2011 season batting .222 with 31 doubles, 8 triples, 9 home runs, 58 RBI, 14 stolen bases, 52 walks, and 183 strikeouts in 541 plate appearances. In 2012, Mitchell moved up to the Double-A Birmingham Barons. Later in the 2012 season, Mitchell was promoted to the Triple-A Charlotte Knights. He finished the 2012 season hitting a combined .237 with 24 doubles, 13 triples, 11 home runs, 67 RBI, 21 stolen bases, 78 walks, and 179 strikeouts in 549 plate appearances. On November 19, 2012, the White Sox added Mitchell to their 40-man roster to protect him from the Rule 5 draft.

Mitchell started the 2013 season with Triple-A Charlotte but after hitting .132 in his first 53 at bats, he was demoted back to Double-A Birmingham. He finished the 2013 season batting .167 with 5 home runs, 23 RBI, 17 stolen bases, 51 walks, and 123 strikeouts in 356 plate appearances. Despite the poor season, Mitchell started the 2014 season at Triple-A Charlotte, but again he was demoted to Birmingham. The White Sox removed him from their 40-man roster after the 2014 season and released him on May 3, 2015.

=== Los Angeles Angels ===
Mitchell signed a minor league deal with the Los Angeles Angels of Anaheim on May 16, 2015. After signing with the Angels, Mitchell played for the Double-A Arkansas Travelers and Triple-A Salt Lake Bees. On November 7, 2015, Mitchell elected free agency.

=== New York Yankees ===
The New York Yankees signed Mitchell to a minor league contract on February 4, 2016. Mitchell was assigned to the Trenton Thunder of the Class AA Eastern League. After hitting a walk off homer against the Richmond Flying Squirrels on May 17, Mitchell was released by Trenton.

=== York Revolution ===
On July 2, 2016, he signed with the York Revolution. During the 2017 season, Mitchell helped lead the team to a championship victory, clocking 122 games with a .295 average and .380 OBP. He slugged .489 with an .869 OPS, as he hit 34 doubles, 3 triples, and 14 homeruns, swiped 24 bases and walked 55 times. He averaged one strike out per game, a considerable improvement from previous years.

=== Cincinnati Reds ===
On December 6, 2017, Mitchell signed a minor league contract with the Cincinnati Reds. Mitchell's release on March 22, 2018, came as a surprise, as he was hitting for an average of .360 with 2 home runs, 2 doubles, 3 walks, 4 RBI, and 2/2 stolen bases with only 5 Ks in 25 at bats during spring training on the Reds’ Triple A team.

=== York Revolution (second stint) ===
On April 11, 2018, Mitchell signed with the York Revolution of the Atlantic League of Professional Baseball. In 117 games for York, he batted .275/.364/.383 with six home runs, 44 RBI, and 33 stolen bases. Mitchell became a free agent following the 2018 season.

=== Sugar Land Skeeters ===
On April 15, 2019, Mitchell signed with the Sugar Land Skeeters of the Atlantic League of Professional Baseball. He was released on July 16, 2019. In 63 games he hit .258/.356/.384 with 6 home runs, 28 RBIs and 22 stolen bases.

=== High Point Rockers ===
On July 31, 2019, Mitchell signed with the High Point Rockers of the Atlantic League of Professional Baseball. He became a free agent following the season. On April 8, 2020, Mitchell re-signed with the Rockers for the 2020 season, but didn't appear in any games as the season was canceled due to the COVID-19 pandemic.

=== Eastern Reyes del Tigre ===
In July 2020, Mitchell signed on to play for the Eastern Reyes del Tigre of the Constellation Energy League, a makeshift 4-team independent league created as a result of the COVID-19 pandemic, for the 2020 season.

=== High Point Rockers (second stint) ===
On May 11, 2021, Mitchell signed with the High Point Rockers of the Atlantic League. In 114 games for the Rockers, he batted .242/.378/.425 with 14 home runs, 66 RBI, and 27 stolen bases. Mitchell became a free agent following the season.

On April 21, 2022, Mitchell re-signed with the Rockers for the 2022 season. Mitchell appeared in only one game for High Point, going 0-for-3 with a walk, before he was released on April 28.

Mitchell later retired from professional baseball and joined ESPN's SEC Network as an analyst in April 2024.

== Awards ==
- 2008 NCAA Regional All-Tournament Team
- 2008 Second-Team All-Louisiana
- SEC Freshman of the Week (February 26, 2007)
- 2009 College World Series Most Outstanding Player
