= Ryan Schimpf =

American baseball player (born 1988)

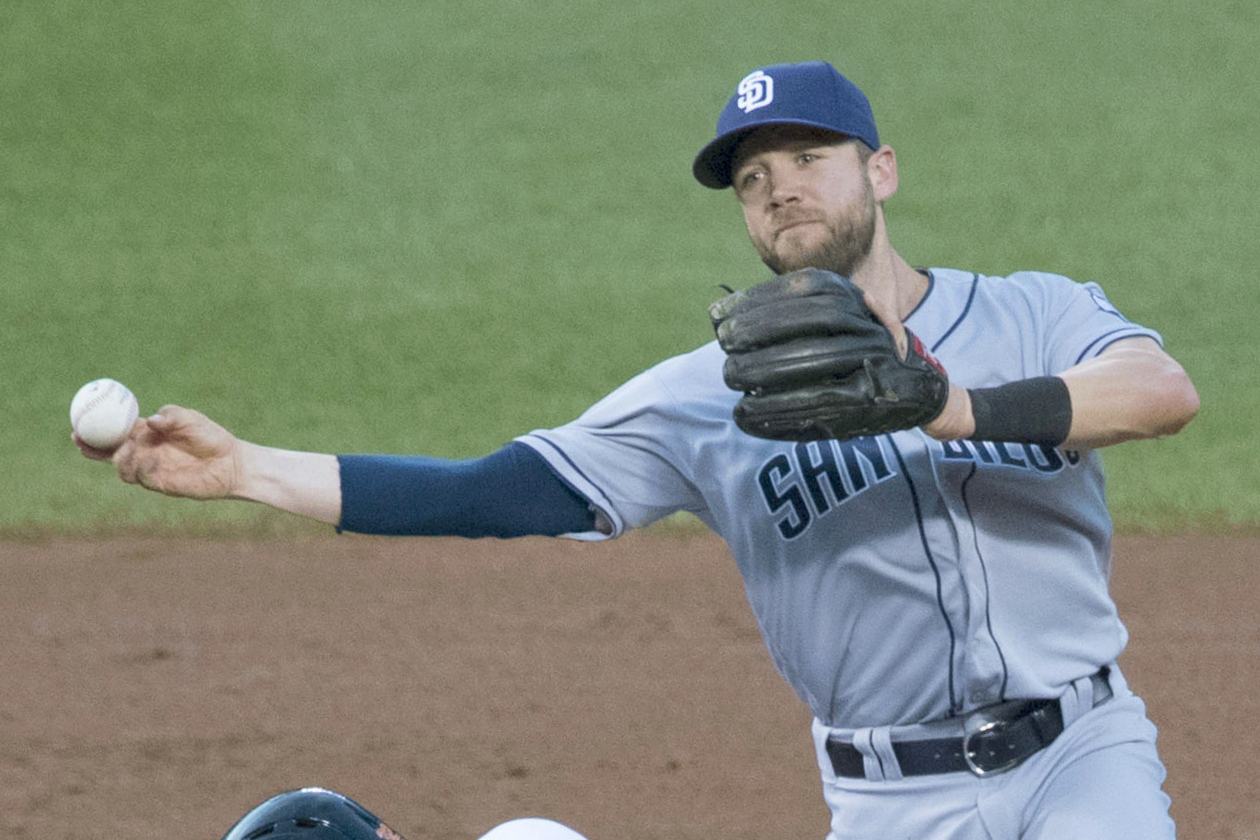
- Schimpf with the San Diego Padres
- Second baseman / Third baseman
- Born: April 11, 1988 (age 38); Covington, Louisiana, U.S.
- Batted: Left Threw: Right

MLB debut
- June 14, 2016, for the San Diego Padres

Last MLB appearance
- May 2, 2018, for the Los Angeles Angels

Career statistics
- Batting average: .195
- Home runs: 35
- Runs batted in: 78
- Stats at Baseball Reference

Teams
- San Diego Padres (2016–2017); Los Angeles Angels (2018)

Ryan Michael Schimpf (born April 11, 1988) is an American former professional baseball infielder. He played in Major League Baseball (MLB) for the San Diego Padres and Los Angeles Angels. He made his MLB debut in 2016 with the Padres and was named the National League's Rookie of the Month for July 2016.

== High school and college ==
Schimpf attended St. Paul's School in Covington, Louisiana, and Louisiana State University (LSU), where he played college baseball for the LSU Tigers. With LSU, Schimpf was a member of the 2009 College World Series champions.

== Professional career ==
=== Toronto Blue Jays ===
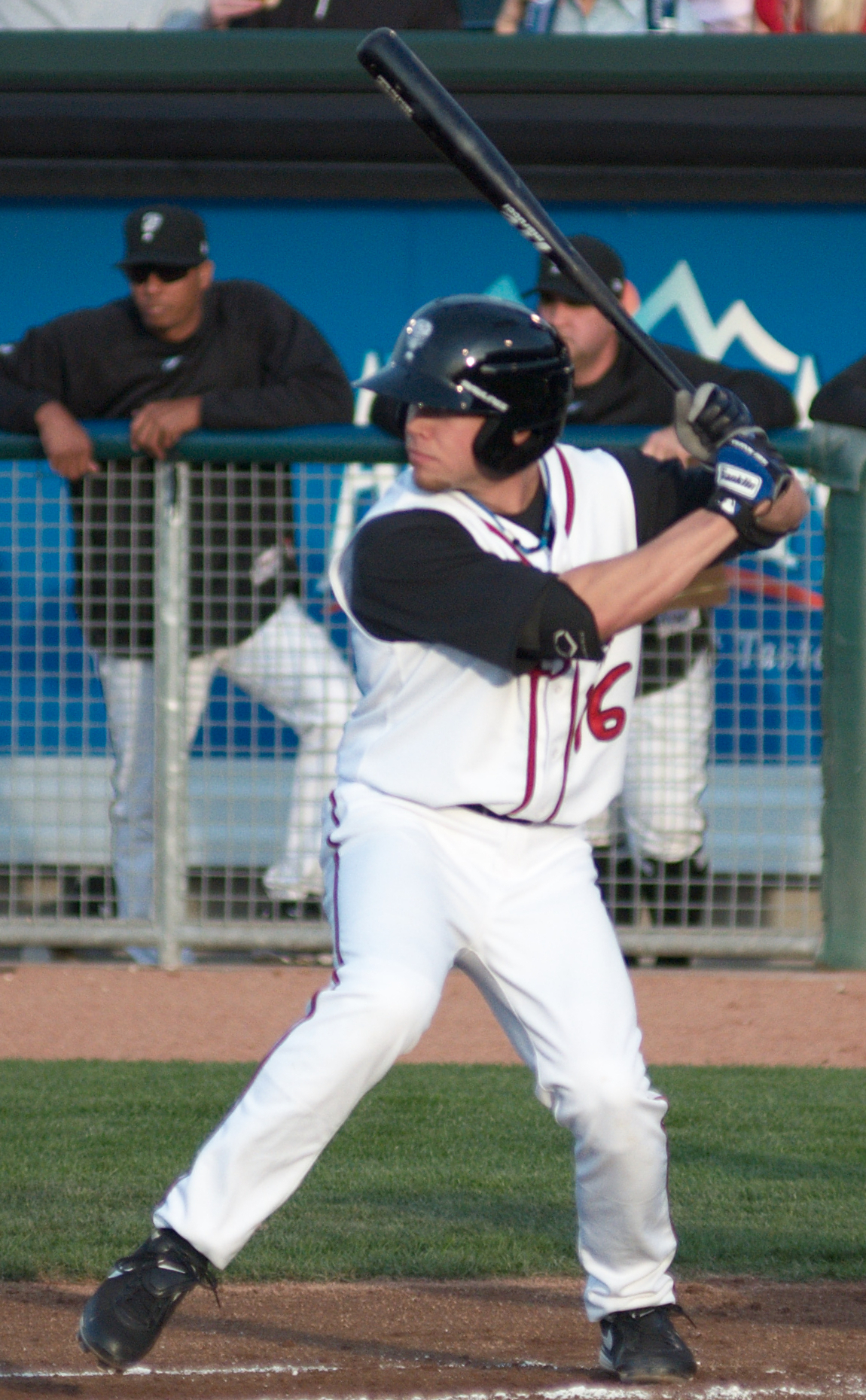
Schimpf batting for the Lansing Lugnuts in 2010

The Toronto Blue Jays selected Schimpf in the fifth round (160th overall) of the 2009 Major League Baseball draft. He signed with the Blue Jays and was assigned to the Gulf Coast Blue Jays of the Rookie-level Gulf Coast League, where he played in two games, before being promoted to the Auburn Doubledays of the Low-A New York-Penn League. In 36 total games in 2009, Schimpf batted .293 with three home runs and 14 runs batted in (RBI). In 2010, Schimpf played for the Lansing Lugnuts of the Single-A Midwest League and the Dunedin Blue Jays of the High-A Florida State League, hitting .237 with eight home runs and 52 RBI in a combined 110 games. He was named a mid-season All-Star for Lansing. Schimpf began the 2011 season on the disabled list, not appearing in a minor league game until June 9. In 57 games played for Dunedin that year, he hit .240 with 10 home runs and 36 RBI.

Schimpf began 2012 with Dunedin, and was named a mid-season All-Star for the second time in his career. In late July, he earned a promotion to the New Hampshire Fisher Cats of the Double-A Eastern League, where he finished the 2012 campaign. In a career-high 129 games played, Schimpf batted .269 with 22 home runs and 76 RBI. Schimpf played the entire 2013 season with New Hampshire, where he hit .210, 23 home runs, and 65 RBI in 126 games. He split the 2014 season with New Hampshire and the Buffalo Bisons of the Triple-A International League, appearing in 117 games and hitting .227 with 24 home runs and 58 RBI. In the offseason, Schimpf appeared in 26 games for the Venados de Mazatlán of the Mexican Pacific League. Schimpf split the 2015 season between New Hampshire and Buffalo, and in 107 games hit .250 with 23 home runs and 63 RBI.

=== San Diego Padres ===
Schimpf became a free agent after the 2015 season, and signed a minor league contract with the San Diego Padres on November 25, 2015. Schimpf began the 2016 season with the El Paso Chihuahuas of the Triple-A Pacific Coast League (PCL). In 98 games at the level with Buffalo over two seasons, Schimpf had hit .193 with 12 home runs and 28 RBI. However, Schimpf hit .355/.432/.729 with 15 home runs and 48 RBI in 51 games before his call-up, his slugging percentage and 1.160 on-base plus slugging leading the league at the time. He had earned Player of the Week honors in the PCL on June 5.

The Padres promoted Schimpf to the major leagues on June 14, 2016, making his debut that night against the Miami Marlins as a third baseman. Schimpf hit his first career home run on July 1 against the New York Yankees. On July 24, Schimpf set a Padres rookie record by slugging his ninth home run of the calendar month. He hit his record-breaking home run against Washington Nationals reliever Shawn Kelley to tie the game in the eighth inning, leading to a 10-6 Padres victory. Through July 27, his 9 home runs also lead the entire league for the month of July. Schimpf won the National League Rookie of the Month Award for July. On August 12, Schimpf hit his first career grand slam off of New York Mets starting pitcher Logan Verrett. Schimpf made 89 appearances for the Padres during his rookie campaign, batting .217/.336/.533 with 20 home runs and 51 RBI.

Schimpf made the Padres' Opening Day roster in 2017 as their starting third baseman. He played in 53 contests for San Diego, batting .158/.284/.424 with 14 home runs and 25 RBI.

=== Los Angeles Angels ===
On December 12, 2017, the Padres traded Schimpf to the Tampa Bay Rays in exchange for Deion Tansel. On March 3, 2018, the Rays designated Schimpf for assignment. Two days later, Tampa Bay traded Schimpf to the Atlanta Braves in exchange for cash considerations. On March 31, Schimpf was traded to the Los Angeles Angels in exchange for catcher Carlos Pérez. On April 7, the Angels called up Schimpf and he pinch-hit later that day. He was released by the Angels on May 22.

On March 29, 2019, Schimpf signed with the Sugar Land Skeeters of the Atlantic League of Professional Baseball. However, he was released by the team without making an appearance on April 24.

=== Mexican Pacific League ===
In 2014, Schimpf appeared in 26 games for the Venados de Mazatlán of the Mexican Pacific League.

On October 18, 2018, Schimpf signed with the Naranjeros de Hermosillo of the Mexican Pacific League. He was released on October 24, 2018, after failing to travel with the team for a series in Culiacán.

== Personal life ==
Schimpf and his wife, Felicia, have two children.
