= Growth Research Unit =

The Growth Research Unit (GRU) is a non-for-profit association headquartered in the international programmes office, at the Cracow University of Economics in Poland. The association operates as a multi-disciplinary platform, encouraging discussion and research into the strategic determinants of economic growth in respect of the former socialist countries of CE Europe and SE Asia. These goals are achieved through an annual conference meeting at which members contribute to round table discussion sessions and present research papers prior to release for publication.

== Membership ==
GRU welcomes new members interested in working on challenging theoretical and applied economic issues as well as on related fields, which focus on the emerging countries of CE Europe and SE Asia.

Membership automatically provides full access to all research publications as well as the opportunity to meet other members with shared interests at our annual conference and round table sessions (October each year).

== Future events ==
- Cracow Summer School Workshop 2010
- Summer School Application Form 2010
- October Conference 2010

== Past events ==
- June 2008, Conference, Chinese-American Scholars Association, Cracow, Poland
- Cracow Summer School Workshop 2009
- GRU Members Conference October 2009
