= David Grewe =

American baseball player and coach (born 1976)

Biographical details
- Born: c. 1976 (age 49–50)

Playing career
- 1996–1998: Dayton
- Position: Catcher

Coaching career (HC unless noted)
- 1999–2000: Chicago (Asst.)
- 2001–2002: Central Michigan (Asst.)
- 2003–2005: Notre Dame (Asst.)
- 2006–2008: Michigan State
- 2009–2011: LSU (Asst.)

Head coaching record
- Overall: 75–85

David Grewe (born 1976) is the former head baseball coach at Michigan State University and former associate head baseball coach at Louisiana State University, and former head baseball coach at Milligan College, and former assistant baseball coach at Notre Dame, Central Michigan and University of Chicago. He won the 2009 National Championship in Omaha, Nebraska with the LSU Tigers.

In 2019, Grewe returned to South Bend, Indiana, to start a career in the RV industry working as a manufacturer's representative. Prior to that, he founded his own company, built a sports leadership platform called iRecruit1440, and launched a sports technology platform called RecruitsIQ, a computer software platform that organizes performance data, historical trends, and recruiting tendencies of college athletic programs and then makes it accessible for the recruitable athlete, using an algorithm and matching preferences.

== Education and playing career ==
David Grewe was raised in Royal Oak, Michigan. He graduated from University of Detroit Jesuit High School and Academy in 1994. Grewe attended and played baseball for John Carroll University and the University of Dayton. He graduated from Dayton in 1998 as a sports management major with a double minor in marketing and public relations.

While in college, Grewe was an assistant coach for the Motor City Pride summer team that posted a 29–7 record in 1996 and had 94 percent of its players advance to play at the collegiate level.

Grewe earned three varsity letters at Dayton, playing catcher, first base and third base. In his senior season, he batted .324 and helped the Flyers earn their first winning season since 1979.

== Coaching career ==
Grewe assisted at the University of Chicago for the 1999 and 2000 seasons. His 2000 team broke six all-time school batting records. He then served as hitting coach and worked with the infielders and catchers as an assistant coach at Central Michigan University in 2001–2002. As hitting instructor, his 2001 team broke three all-time school records.

Prior to taking over in East Lansing, Grewe was the lead assistant coach at the University of Notre Dame. Grewe served as recruiting coordinator for the Fighting Irish and was instrumental in attracting two top-10 recruiting classes to Notre Dame with the 2004 class being ranked number six in the country by Baseball America and the 2006 class being ranked number seven by Team One Baseball. His 2004 team is still the school record holder for all-time single season wins. He coached 13 players who graduated and entered the professional baseball ranks.

The Irish won three straight Big East championships and went to three straight NCAA regionals during Grewe's tenure. In addition to his position as recruiting coordinator, Grewe worked with the catchers and hitters.

Grewe was named head baseball coach at Michigan State on July 13, 2005. At age 29, he was the youngest Division 1 BCS head coach in the nation. The Spartans were 26–30 in 2006 and 25–26 in 2007. MSU's 2008 recruiting class was named tops in the Big 10 by Baseball America. In three short years, Grewe raised over $5 million to build the current practice facilities and brand new baseball stadium. At the time, he secured the second largest single donor gift in the history of the athletic department with a $4 million donation by Drayton McLane, garnering stadium naming rights. This was finalized just after Grewe honored McLane as the baseball program's Alumnus of the Year. Grewe and his staff recruited and coached the 2011 Big Ten Pitcher of the Year, 2011 Big Ten Player of the Year, and the school's all-time hits leader. Despite inheriting a dormant program and only amassing a 75-85 record over three years, Grewe's recruits and solid foundation led to the program's Big Ten Championship tie in 2011, the first since 1979.

On June 25, 2008, it was announced that Grewe would become the new Associate Head baseball coach at LSU, reuniting him with Paul Mainieri. In his first year with the Tigers, Grewe coached three pitchers to All-American status, a feat never accomplished in the history of LSU baseball, and a feat that no Division 1 coach had accomplished since 2009. His 2009 pitching staff led the nation in strikeouts and were ranked #9 nationally in earned run average. Grewe coached 21 players who went on to play professional baseball. He recruited three first-round draft picks, including an eventual MLB All-Star Game MVP. He was the only "recruiting coordinator" in the entire country to have three consecutive recruiting classes ranked in the top 7 nationally. His 2010 recruiting class was ranked #1 in the nation by Collegiate Baseball and #2 in the nation by Baseball America. His 2009 team would win every championship tournament they played, including defeating Texas at the College World Series on June 24, 2009.

== Year-by-year head coaching record ==
Year	School	Overall	Conference
2006	Michigan State	26–30	13–19
2007	Michigan State	25–26	15–16
2008	Michigan State	24–29	12–18
TOTALS		75–85	40–53

== Personal ==
Grewe married the former Annie Brammer in the fall of 2006 in South Bend, Indiana. David and his wife have seven children, Charlie, Mary Claire, Jack, Caroline, Georgia, Henry and Louis.
