= Wilhelm Grewe =

German diplomat and professor of international law (1911–2000)

Wilhelm Georg Grewe (16 October 1911 – 11 January 2000) was a German diplomat and professor of international law. He played a major role in formulating the Hallstein Doctrine. He was an expert in international law and was the author of Epochen der Völkerrechtsgeschichte (1984), a standard work on the subject.

== Academic career ==
From 1930 to 1934 Grewe studied law at Hamburg, Berlin, Freiburg and Frankfurt. He then worked as an assistant to Professor Ernst Forsthof at the University of Hamburg, and in 1936 he was awarded a doctorate (Dr. jur.). His doctoral thesis was entitled Gnade und Recht (Mercy and Law). From 1936 to 1937 he was at the University of Königsberg and from 1937 to 1939 at the Deutsches Institut für außenpolitische Forschung (German Institute for Foreign Policy Research) in Berlin, where he was responsible for International Law.

From 1939 Grewe lectured at the Hochschule für Politik (School of Politics) in Berlin, which, in 1940, was incorporated into the new Auslandswissenschaftliche Fakultät (Faculty of Foreign Studies) at the Friedrich Wilhelm University of Berlin, where he served as lecturer in "Legal Foundations of Foreign Policy". In 1941 Grewe was awarded his habilitation on the basis of work that was later to become part of his book Epochen der Völkerrechtsgeschichte, and he lectured at the Faculty of Foreign Studies and the Faculty of Law (in Berlin). In 1942 he was appointed extraordinary professor at the Faculty of Foreign Studies, where he taught "Legal Foundations of Foreign Policy" and "Policy of International Law" (Völkerrechtspolitik).

After World War II, Grewe taught at the University of Göttingen from 1945 to 1947 and then in Freiburg im Breisgau from 1947.

== Private life ==
In 1943 Grewe married Marianne Partsch.

He is the father of Constance Grewe, the former judge of the Constitutional Court of Bosnia and Herzegovina.

== Diplomatic career ==
Wilhelm Grewe served under Konrad Adenauer in the post-war years, from 1951 to 1955, heading the delegation negotiating the end of Allied occupation of West Germany, which led to the signing of the Convention on Relations between the Three Powers and the Federal Republic (Deutschlandvertrag) in 1954. At the West German Foreign Office, he became acting head of the legal department (1953 – 1954), head of the Political Department (1955 – 1958), and from 1954 to 1955 he led the West German observer delegation at the Four Powers Conferences in Berlin and Geneva. Grewe played a major role in formulating the Hallstein Doctrine (1955- ).

Grewe served as West Germany's ambassador to Washington (1958–1962) and to Tokyo (1971–1976) and he was Permanent Representative to the North Atlantic Council at NATO headquarters in Paris and Brussels (1962–1971). From 1971 to 1976, while based in Tokyo, he also functioned as West German ambassador to Mongolia.

== Books by Wilhelm G. Grewe ==
- Grewe, Wilhelm; Transl. and rev. by Michael Byers: The epochs of international law; de Gruyter; 2000; ISBN 3-11-015339-4
- Grewe, Wilhelm: Epochen der Völkerrechtsgeschichte (2nd ed.); Nomos, 1988, ISBN 3-7890-1608-X (in German)
- Grewe, Wilhelm: Rückblenden; Propyläen, 1979; ISBN 3-549-07387-9 (partial memoirs) (in German)
