= Anthony Ranaudo =

American baseball player (born 1989)

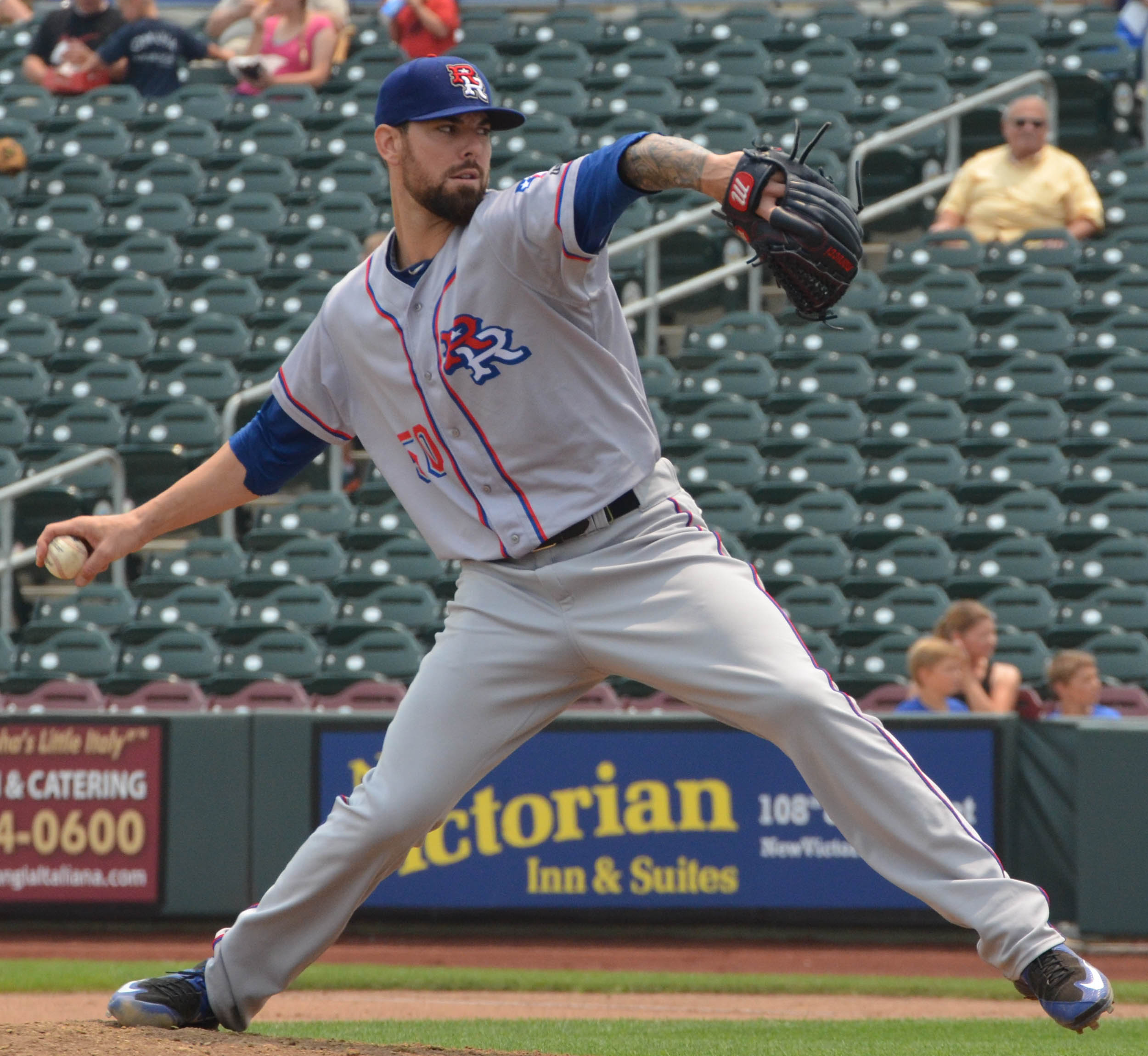
- Ranaudo pitching for the Round Rock Express in 2015
- Pitcher
- Born: September 9, 1989 (age 36); Freehold Township, New Jersey, U.S.
- Batted: Right Threw: Right

Professional debut
- MLB: August 1, 2014, for the Boston Red Sox
- KBO: May 24, 2017, for the Samsung Lions

Last appearance
- MLB: September 21, 2016, for the Chicago White Sox
- KBO: July 27, 2017, for the Samsung Lions

MLB statistics
- Win–loss record: 5–5
- Earned run average: 7.01
- Strikeouts: 44

KBO statistics
- Win–loss record: 2–3
- Earned run average: 6.80
- Strikeouts: 28
- Stats at Baseball Reference

Teams
- Boston Red Sox (2014); Texas Rangers (2015–2016); Chicago White Sox (2016); Samsung Lions (2017)

Anthony Ronald Ranaudo (born September 9, 1989) is an American former professional baseball pitcher. He has previously played in Major League Baseball (MLB) for the Boston Red Sox, Texas Rangers, and Chicago White Sox, and in the KBO League for the Samsung Lions. Prior to playing professionally, Ranaudo attended Louisiana State University and played college baseball for the LSU Tigers.

== Early life and amateur career ==
Ranaudo was one of four children born to Angelo and Sharon Ranaudo. He was a New York Yankees fan growing up. He attended St. Aloysius School in Jackson Township, New Jersey and St. Rose High School in Belmar, New Jersey. During his time at St. Rose, he also played basketball and was president of the student council. Amassing numerous awards as a standout pitcher, Ranaudo was selected by the Texas Rangers in the 11th round of the 2007 Major League Baseball draft upon graduation, but did not sign a contract.

Ranaudo attended Louisiana State University (LSU). He pitched for the LSU Tigers baseball team from 2008 through 2010. Entering his junior season in 2010, Ranaudo was seen by many as one of the top pitchers coming into the draft. However, he missed five weeks of the 2010 season due to an elbow injury. He had a standout year in 2009, third in NCAA strikeouts and was a critical player in the Tigers' College World Series victory. However, upon returning from the elbow injury in 2010, neither his numbers nor performance were the same as the previous year.

Ranaudo also pitched twice in the Cape Cod Baseball League. After his freshman year he pitched for the Y-D Red Sox, and for the Brewster Whitecaps following his junior year. He dominated during his tenure with the Whitecaps, pitching to a 3–0 record, without giving up a run in 29.2 innings of 31/8 K/BB pitching.

== Professional career ==
=== Boston Red Sox (2014) ===
==== Minor leagues ====
Ranaudo was selected 39th overall in the supplemental first round of the 2010 Major League Baseball draft by the Boston Red Sox. He signed with them for a $2.55 million signing bonus shortly before the signing deadline on August 16, 2010. Ranaudo was assigned first to the Red Sox's minor league affiliate Lowell Spinners, where he did not pitch in 2010.

In 2011, Ranaudo made his professional debut with the Greenville Drive of the South Atlantic League. In 10 starts for the Drive, he posted a 4–1 record with a 3.33 earned run average (ERA) and a 1.10 walks plus hits per inning pitched (WHIP) over 46 innings pitched. Ranaudo was then promoted to the High-A Salem Red Sox of the Carolina League, where he went 5–5 with a 4.33 ERA in 16 starts, including 67 strikeouts and a 1.35 WHIP in 81 innings. He finished the season with a combined 9–6 record and a 3.97 ERA in 26 starts, 117 strikeouts, a 1.27 WHIP and 127 innings pitched.

Ranaudo was promoted to the Double-A Portland Sea Dogs of the Eastern League for the 2012 season. Previously, he was ranked as the top pitching prospect in the Red Sox organization and the 5th overall minor league prospect in Major League Baseball by MiLB.com. Ranaudo was injured for much of April and May and did not earn his first win with the Sea Dogs until June. His season ended early due to injuries, going 1–3 with a 6.69 earned run average over nine starts in just 37 2/3 innings of work.

Ranaudo returned to the Portland Sea Dogs in 2013, earning bids in the All-Star Futures Game and the Eastern League All-Star Game along the way. At the end of July, he was leading the league in both WHIP (1.09) and batting average against (.204), while posting an 8–4 record and a 2.95 ERA in 19 starts, which included an 8.7 K/9 rate. He then gained a promotion to Triple-A Pawtucket Red Sox on August 2.

Late in August, Ranaudo was selected to the Eastern League Year–End All-Star team and was named the circuit's Pitcher of the Year, as voted on by league managers and media members.

On November 20, 2013, the Red Sox added Ranaudo to their 40-man roster to protect him from the Rule 5 draft.

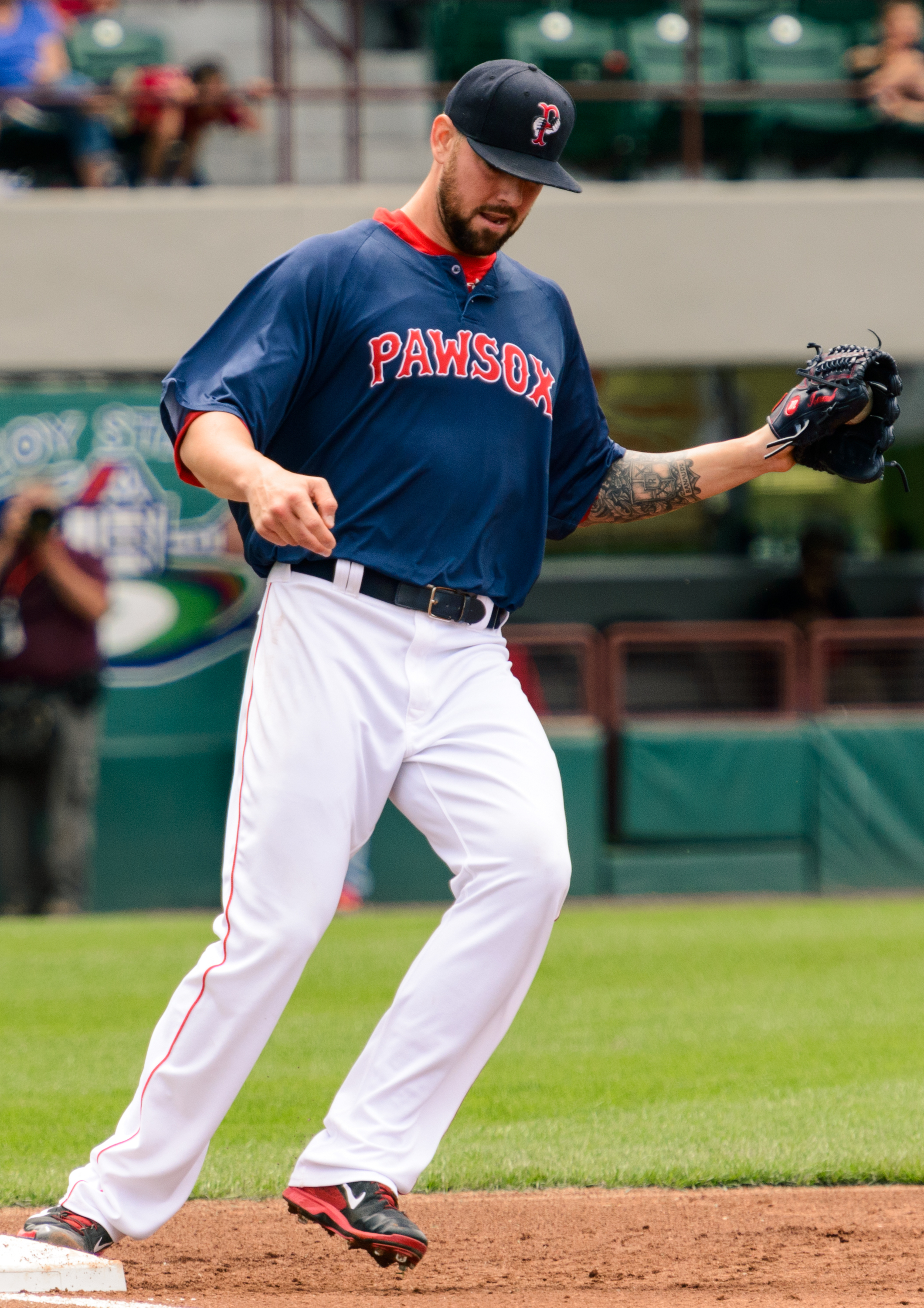
Ranaudo playing for the Pawtucket Red Sox in 2014

Ranaudo began the 2014 season in the Pawtucket Red Sox rotation. He was selected to the 2014 International League All-Star Team but did not play due to an injury.

==== Major leagues ====
Ranaudo was called up to the major leagues for the first time on August 1, 2014 and made his Major League Baseball debut that day in a start against the New York Yankees. In that start he collected his first career strikeout, striking out Derek Jeter, who coincidentally was his boyhood sports hero. He also won the game. The next day, Ranaudo was optioned back to Pawtucket, but recalled August 12. He made seven starts for Boston during his rookie campaign, posting a 4-3 record and 4.81 ERA with 15 strikeouts across 39 1/3 innings pitched.

=== Texas Rangers (2015–2016) ===
On January 27, 2015, the Red Sox traded Ranaudo to the Texas Rangers in exchange for pitcher Robbie Ross Jr. He was sent down to begin the season with Triple–A Round Rock Express on March 28, 2015.

Ranaudo began the 2016 season with Triple–A Round Rock Express, and was recalled on May 6 by the Rangers, for whom he made his season debut on May 7 at Detroit, against the Tigers, entering the game in the third inning with the Rangers down 3–2. Ranaudo pitched 2 1/3 innings, giving up two runs on an Ian Kinsler home run in the fourth inning as Anthony Gose was on base via a walk. He would give up one other hit in that inning (a single to Miguel Cabrera). Ranaudo would appear in one more game (May 10 against the Chicago White Sox) before being optioned back to Triple-A Round Rock on May 11.

=== Chicago White Sox (2016) ===
Ranaudo was traded on May 12 to the Chicago White Sox for minor league right-handed pitcher Matt Ball. He was then optioned on May 13 to the Triple-A Charlotte Knights. Ranaudo started in the majors again for the White Sox on July 27 against the Chicago Cubs at Wrigley Field and got his first MLB hit with a fifth inning home run. On July 28, he was reassigned to Triple-A Charlotte. During the 2016 offseason, Ranaudo was released by the White Sox.

=== Samsung Lions (2017) ===
On November 22, 2016, Ranaudo signed a one-year, $1.05 million contract with the Samsung Lions of the KBO League. He became a free agent after the 2017 season.

=== Chicago Dogs (2025) ===
On July 29, 2025, after seven years of inactivity, Ranaudo signed with the Chicago Dogs of the American Association of Professional Baseball. In 11 games he threw 15 innings of relief going 2-1 with a 6.60 ERA and 12 strikeouts.
