= 2009 Cal State Fullerton Titans baseball team =

American college baseball season

2009 Cal State Fullerton Titans baseball

NCAA Fullerton Super Regional champions NCAA Fullerton Regional champions

College World Series, 0–2
- Conference: Big West Conference
- Record: 47–16 (17–7 Big West)
- Head coach: Dave Serrano (2nd year)
- Home stadium: Goodwin Field

2009 Big West Conference baseball standings
	Conf.				Overall
Team	W		L	PCT	W		L	PCT
No. 9 UC Irvine ‍†‍‍^{y}	22	–	2	.917	45	–	15	.750
No. 7 Cal State Fullerton ‍‍‍^{y}	17	–	7	.708	47	–	16	.746
Cal Poly ‍‍‍^{y}	14	–	10	.583	37	–	21	.638
UC Riverside ‍‍‍	12	–	12	.500	33	–	20	.623
UC Santa Barbara ‍‍‍	11	–	13	.458	29	–	23	.558
Long Beach State ‍‍‍	11	–	13	.458	25	–	29	.463
Pacific ‍‍‍	9	–	15	.375	21	–	32	.396
Cal State Northridge ‍‍‍	7	–	17	.292	24	–	32	.429
UC Davis ‍‍‍	5	–	19	.208	13	–	42	.236
† – Conference champion y – Invited to the NCAA tournament As of June 3, 2009; Rankings from Collegiate Baseball

The 2009 Cal State Fullerton Titans baseball team represented California State University, Fullerton in the 2009 NCAA Division I baseball season. The Titans played their home games at Goodwin Field, and played as part of the Big West Conference. The team was coached by Dave Serrano in his second season as head coach at Cal State Fullerton.

The Titans reached the College World Series, their sixteenth appearance in Omaha, where they finished tied for seventh place after losing games to Arkansas and Virginia.

== Personnel ==
=== Roster ===
2009 Cal State Fullerton Titans roster
Pitchers: 10 - Tyler Pill - Freshman; 15 - Kyle Witten - Junior; 26 - Michael Morrison - Junior; 27 - Travis Kelly - Junior; 30 - Noe Ramirez - Freshman; 33 - Nick Ramirez - Freshman; 34 - Kevin Rath - Sophomore; 35 - Daniel Renken - Sophomore; 39 - Brock Floro - Sophomore; 40 - Kyle Mertins - Junior; 42 - Ryan Ackland - Junior; 47 - R.J. Hively - RS Freshman; 51 - Jason Dovel - Sophomore; 53 - Colin O’Connell - Freshman; 57 - Derrick Dingeman - Freshman	Catchers: 6 - Billy Marcoe - Junior; 23 - Dustin Garneau - Senior; 28 - Wes Borba - Junior; 44 - Cody Collins - Freshman; Outfielders: 3 - Josh Fellhauer - Junior; 13 - Matthew Fahey - Senior; 19 - Jeff Newman - Senior; 24 - Khris Davis - Junior; 54 - Austin Kingsolver - Freshman	Infielders: 1 - Corey Jones - Junior; 2 - Shevis Shima - Senior; 4 - Christian Colón - Sophomore; 5 - Jared Clark - Senior; 17 - Carlos Lopez - Freshman; 20 - Tony Harkey - Sophomore; 22 - Gary Brown - Sophomore; 25 - Joey Siddons - Junior; 31 - Matt Orloff - Freshman; 41 - Joe Scott - Senior; 43 - Walker Moore - Sophomore

=== Coaches ===
2009 Cal State Fullerton Titans baseball coaching staff
- 18 - Dave Serrano - Head coach - 2nd Season
- 12 - Sergio Brown - Assistant coach - 2nd Season
- 9 - Greg Bergeron - Assistant coach - 2nd Season
- 11 - Brett Lindgren - Assistant coach - 2nd Season

== Schedule and results ==
Legend
Cal State Fullerton win
Cal State Fullerton loss

2009 Cal State Fullerton Titans baseball game log
Regular season

February
Date	Opponent	Rank	Site/Stadium	Score	Overall Record	Big West Record
Feb 20	TCU*	No. 13	Goodwin Field • Fullerton, CA	W 7–6	1–0	
Feb 21	TCU*	No. 13	Goodwin Field • Fullerton, CA	L 6–8	1–1	
Feb 22	TCU*	No. 13	Goodwin Field • Fullerton, CA	L 6–11	1–2	
Feb 24	at No. 26 San Diego State*	No. 17	Tony Gwynn Stadium • San Diego, CA	W 8–6	2–2	
Feb 27	No. 7 Stanford*	No. 17	Goodwin Field • Fullerton, CA	W 8–1	3–2	
Feb 28	No. 7 Stanford*	No. 17	Goodwin Field • Fullerton, CA	W 3–2	4–2	

March
Date	Opponent	Rank	Site/Stadium	Score	Overall Record	Big West Record
Mar 1	No. 7 Stanford*	No. 17	Goodwin Field • Fullerton, CA	W 9–3	5–2	
Mar 3	at San Diego State*	No. 12	Tony Gwynn Stadium • San Diego, CA	W 7–2	6–2	
Mar 6	at Southern Miss*	No. 12	Pete Taylor Park • Hattiesburg, MS	W 15–2	7–2	
Mar 7	at Southern Miss*	No. 12	Pete Taylor Park • Hattiesburg, MS	W 11–6	8–2	
Mar 8	at Southern Miss*	No. 12	Pete Taylor Park • Hattiesburg, MS	W 11–3	9–2	
Mar 10	at No. 9 Texas A&M*	No. 7	Olsen Field at Blue Bell Park • College Station, TX	W 15–5	10–2	
Mar 13	vs Rhode Island*	No. 7	Allie P. Reynolds Stadium • Stillwater, OK	W 17–3	11–2	
Mar 13	at No. 12 Oklahoma State*	No. 7	Allie P. Reynolds Stadium • Stillwater, OK	W 8–4	12–2	
Mar 14	at No. 12 Oklahoma State*	No. 7	Allie P. Reynolds Stadium • Stillwater, OK	L 6–10	12–3	
Mar 15	vs Rhode Island*	No. 5	Allie P. Reynolds Stadium • Stillwater, OK	W 4–3	13–3	
Mar 19	Oral Roberts*	No. 5	Goodwin Field • Fullerton, CA	W 8–3	14–3	
Mar 20	Oral Roberts*	No. 5	Goodwin Field • Fullerton, CA	W 10–6	15–3	
Mar 21	Oral Roberts*	No. 5	Goodwin Field • Fullerton, CA	W 7–1	16–3	
Mar 27	at UC Riverside	No. 2	Riverside Sports Complex • Riverside, CA	L 1–3	16–4	0–1
Mar 28	at UC Riverside	No. 2	Riverside Sports Complex • Riverside, CA	W 4–1^{10}	17–4	1–1
Mar 29	at UC Riverside	No. 2	Riverside Sports Complex • Riverside, CA	W 18–1	18–4	2–1
Mar 31	at No. 7 Arizona State*	No. 2	Packard Stadium • Tempe, AZ	W 7–5	19–4	

April
Date	Opponent	Rank	Site/Stadium	Score	Overall Record	Big West Record
Apr 1	at No. 7 Arizona State*	No. 2	Packard Stadium • Tempe, AZ	L 1–3	19–5	
Apr 3	No. 12 UC Irvine	No. 2	Goodwin Field • Fullerton, CA	L 1–2	19–6	2–2
Apr 4	No. 12 UC Irvine	No. 2	Goodwin Field • Fullerton, CA	L 1–6	19–7	2–3
Apr 5	No. 12 UC Irvine	No. 2	Goodwin Field • Fullerton, CA	W 5–4^{10}	20–7	3–3
Apr 7	Loyola Marymount*	No. 8	Goodwin Field • Fullerton, CA	L 3–8	20–8	
Apr 9	at Cal State Northridge	No. 8	Matador Field • Northridge, CA	L 4–5^{15}	20–9	3–4
Apr 10	at Cal State Northridge	No. 8	Matador Field • Northridge, CA	W 7–5	21–9	4–4
Apr 11	at Cal State Northridge	No. 8	Matador Field • Northridge, CA	W 8–0	22–9	5–4
Apr 14	at USC*	No. 8	Dedeaux Field • Los Angeles, CA	W 9–2	23–9	
Apr 17	Pacific	No. 8	Goodwin Field • Fullerton, CA	L 4–5	23–10	5–5
Apr 18	Pacific	No. 8	Goodwin Field • Fullerton, CA	L 10–14	23–11	5–6
Apr 19	Pacific	No. 8	Goodwin Field • Fullerton, CA	W 4–3	24–11	6–6
Apr 21	San Diego*	No. 10	Goodwin Field • Fullerton, CA	W 8–5	25–11	
Apr 22	at Pepperdine*	No. 10	Eddy D. Field Stadium • Malibu, CA	W 15–2	26–11	
Apr 24	at UC Davis	No. 10	Dobbins Stadium • Davis, CA	W 13–1	27–11	7–6
Apr 25	at UC Davis	No. 10	Dobbins Stadium • Davis, CA	W 3–0	28–11	8–6
Apr 26	at UC Davis	No. 10	Dobbins Stadium • Davis, CA	W 6–0	29–11	9–6
Apr 29	USC*	No. 5	Goodwin Field • Fullerton, CA	L 3–9	29–12	

May
Date	Opponent	Rank	Site/Stadium	Score	Overall Record	Big West Record
May 1	UC Santa Barbara	No. 5	Goodwin Field • Fullerton, CA	W 7–2	30–12	10–6
May 2	UC Santa Barbara	No. 5	Goodwin Field • Fullerton, CA	W 5–4	31–12	11–6
May 3	UC Santa Barbara	No. 5	Goodwin Field • Fullerton, CA	W 15–3	32–12	12–6
May 5	Arizona*	No. 5	Goodwin Field • Fullerton, CA	W 5–2	33–12	
May 6	Arizona*	No. 5	Goodwin Field • Fullerton, CA	W 8–4	34–12	
May 8	at No. 16 Cal Poly	No. 5	Baggett Stadium • San Luis Obispo, CA	W 8–4	35–12	13–6
May 9	at No. 16 Cal Poly	No. 5	Baggett Stadium • San Luis Obispo, CA	W 7–3	36–12	14–6
May 10	at No. 16 Cal Poly	No. 5	Baggett Stadium • San Luis Obispo, CA	L 4–7	36–13	14–7
May 15	UCLA*	No. 5	Goodwin Field • Fullerton, CA	W 6–3	37–13	
May 16	at UCLA*	No. 5	Jackie Robinson Stadium • Los Angeles, CA	W 6–5^{10}	38–13	
May 17	at UCLA*	No. 5	Jackie Robinson Stadium • Los Angeles, CA	L 10–13	38–14	
May 19	Pepperdine*	No. 5	Goodwin Field • Fullerton, CA	W 9–1	39–14	
May 22	Long Beach State	No. 5	Goodwin Field • Fullerton, CA	W 4–3	40–14	15–7
May 23	Long Beach State	No. 5	Goodwin Field • Fullerton, CA	W 7–1	41–14	16–7
May 24	Long Beach State	No. 5	Goodwin Field • Fullerton, CA	W 15–3	42–14	17–7

Postseason

NCAA San Diego Regional
Date	Opponent	Rank/Seed	Site/Stadium	Score	Overall Record	Reg Record
May 29	(4) Utah	No. 4 (1)	Goodwin Field • Fullerton, CA	W 18–2	43–14	1–0
May 30	(3) Gonzaga	No. 4 (1)	Goodwin Field • Fullerton, CA	W 7–4	44–14	2–0
May 31	(4) Utah	No. 4 (1)	Goodwin Field • Fullerton, CA	W 16–3	45–14	3–0

NCAA Fullerton Super Regional
Date	Opponent	Rank/Seed	Site/Stadium	Score	Overall Record	SR Record
June 5	No. 12 Louisville	No. 3 (2)	Goodwin Field • Fullerton, CA	W 12–0	46–14	1–0
June 6	No. 12 Louisville	No. 3 (2)	Goodwin Field • Fullerton, CA	W 11–2	47–14	2–0

College World Series
Date	Opponent	Rank/Seed	Site/Stadium	Score	Overall Record	CWS Record
June 16	No. 7 Arkansas	No. 3 (2)	Johnny Rosenblatt Stadium • Omaha, NE	L 6–10	47–15	0–1
June 19	No. 6 Virginia	No. 3 (2)	Johnny Rosenblatt Stadium • Omaha, NE	L 5–7	47–16	0–2

== Rankings ==
Ranking movements Legend: ██ Increase in ranking ██ Decrease in ranking
	Week																	
Poll	Pre	1	2	3	4	5	6	7	8	9	10	11	12	13	14	15	16	Final
Coaches'	8	8*	10	10	6	3	2	6	6	10	7	6	7	6	5	5*	5*	7
Baseball America	5	7	7	6	4	1	1	6	6	10	6	6	5	4	4	3	3	4
Collegiate Baseball^	13	17	12	7	5	2	2	8	8	10	5	5	5	5	4	3	3	7
NCBWA†	10	16	12	9	7	4	2	6	8	9	6	6	4	5	4	3	3	7

^ Collegiate Baseball ranked 40 teams in their preseason poll, but only ranked 30 teams weekly during the season.
† NCBWA ranks 30 teams in their preseason poll, but only ranks 25 teams weekly during the season.
* A new poll was not released for this week, so for comparison purposes, the previous week's ranking is inserted in this week's slot.
