= 2009 NCAA Division I baseball rankings =

2009 NCAA Division I baseball season
- Duration: February 20–June 24, 2009
- Number of teams: 302
- Preseason No. 1: LSU

Tournament
- Duration: May 29–June 24, 2009
- Most conference bids: ACC (7)

College World Series
- Duration: June 13–June 24, 2009
- Champions: LSU Tigers (6th title)
- Runners-up: Texas Longhorns
- MOP: Jared Mitchell

Seasons
- ← 2008 2010 →

The following polls make up the 2009 NCAA Division I baseball rankings. USA Today and ESPN began publishing the Coaches' Poll of 31 active coaches ranking the top 25 teams in the nation in 1992. Each coach is a member of the American Baseball Coaches Association. Baseball America began publishing its poll of the top 20 teams in college baseball in 1981. Beginning with the 1985 season, it expanded to the top 25. Collegiate Baseball Newspaper published its first human poll of the top 20 teams in college baseball in 1957, and expanded to rank the top 30 teams in 1961.

== Legend ==
	Increase in ranking
	Decrease in ranking
	Not ranked previous week
Italics	Number of first place votes
(#-#)	Win–loss record
т	Tied with team above or below also with this symbol

== USA Today/ESPN Coaches' Poll ==
	Preseason Jan 20	Week 2 Mar 2	Week 3 Mar 9	Week 4 Mar 16	Week 5 Mar 23	Week 6 Mar 30	Week 7 Apr 6	Week 8 Apr 13	Week 9 Apr 20	Week 10 Apr 27	Week 11 May 4	Week 12 May 11	Week 13 May 18	Week 14 May 25	Final Jun 25	
1.	LSU 14	LSU (7-0)	North Carolina (10-2)	North Carolina (14-2)	Georgia (19-2)	Georgia (22-3)	Arizona State (23-5)	Georgia (29-6)	Georgia (31-8)	North Carolina (35-11)	North Carolina (35-11)	UC Irvine (37-11)	UC Irvine (40-12)	UC Irvine (43-13)	LSU (56-17)	1.
2.	North Carolina 12	North Carolina (7-1)	Georgia (12-0)	Texas (14-2)	Arizona State (17-3)	Cal State Fullerton (18-4)	North Carolina (24-7)	Arizona State (25-8)	Arizona State (28-8)	Arizona State (31-9)	UC Irvine (34-11)	Arizona State (38-11)	Arizona State (41-11)	LSU (46-16)	Texas (50-16)	2.
3.	Rice 1	Georgia (8-0)	Texas (12-1)	Georgia (15-2)	Cal State Fullerton (16-3)	Arizona State (19-4)	Georgia (25-5)	LSU (26-9)	North Carolina (31-10)	UC Irvine (30-11)	Rice (31-11)	LSU (38-14)	LSU (41-15)	Arizona State (44-12)	Arizona State (51-14)	3.
4.	Georgia	Texas (9-0)	LSU (10-2)	Arizona State (14-2)	Miami (FL) (18-4)	Georgia Tech (18-4)	LSU (23-8)	Rice (25-8)	Texas (29-8)	Rice (28-10)	LSU (36-13)	North Carolina (38-13)	North Carolina (41-14)	Texas (41-13)	North Carolina (48-18)	4.
5.	Texas A&M 2	Arizona State (8-1)	Arizona State (11-1)	LSU (13-4)	LSU (17-5)	LSU (21-6)	Miami (FL) (23-8)	North Carolina (27-9)	Rice (27-10)	LSU (33-12)	Arizona State (33-11)	Rice (33-13)	Texas (38-12)	Cal State Fullerton (42-14)	Virginia (49-15)	5.
6.	Stanford 1	Texas A&M (7-2)	Miami (FL) (10-2)	Cal State Fullerton (13-3)	North Carolina (17-4)	North Carolina (20-6)	Cal State Fullerton (20-7)	Cal State Fullerton (22-9)	UC Irvine (26-10)	Georgia (33-11)	Cal State Fullerton (32-12)	Texas (36-12)	Cal State Fullerton (38-14)	North Carolina (42-16)	Arkansas (41-24)	6.
7.	Arizona State	Rice (5-2)	Cal State Fullerton (9-2)	Miami (FL) (14-3)	Georgia Tech (16-2)	Miami (FL) (20-7)	Rice (21-7)	Miami (FL) (25-10) т	Georgia Tech (26-8)	Cal State Fullerton (29-11)	Texas (33-11)	Cal State Fullerton (36-13)	Florida State (40-14)	Rice (39-15)	Cal State Fullerton (47-16)	7.
8.	Cal State Fullerton	Miami (FL) (6-1)	Texas A&M (11-3)	Texas A&M (13-4)	Texas (14-6)	Arkansas (19-5)	Georgia Tech (19-6)	UC Irvine (22-9)	LSU (28-12)	Arkansas (29-12)	Georgia Tech (31-11)	Georgia Tech (33-12)	Mississippi (40-15)	Florida State (42-16)	Southern Miss (40-26)	8.
9.	Florida State т	Florida State (6-1)	Georgia Tech (9-1)	Georgia Tech (12-1)	Rice (14-6)	Rice (17-7)	Arkansas (22-6)	Oklahoma (28-8)	Arkansas (26-11)	Texas (29-11)	Mississippi (36-13)	Florida State (36-14)	Rice (35-15)	Virginia (43-12)	Rice (43-18)	9.
10.	Texas т	Cal State Fullerton (5-2)	Rice (8-4)	Coastal Carolina (15-1)	Arkansas (16-4)	Oklahoma (22-6)	UC Irvine (19-8)	Texas (24-8)	Cal State Fullerton (24-11)	Georgia Tech (28-11)	Florida State (33-12)	Virginia (37-10)	Florida (38-18)	Oklahoma (41-18)	Florida State (46-18)	10.
11.	Mississippi	Georgia Tech (6-1)	Baylor (10-2)	Oklahoma State (13-4)	Oklahoma (20-5)	Texas A&M (18-9)	Oklahoma (25-7)	Georgia Tech (21-8)	Miami (FL) (26-13)	Oklahoma (33-11)	Arkansas (31-14)	Mississippi (37-15)	Oklahoma (40-16)	Mississippi (40-17)	Mississippi (44-20)	11.
12.	Georgia Tech	UC Irvine (5-2)	Oklahoma State (9-2)	Rice (10-5)	Baylor (14-5)	Baylor (17-6)	Texas (20-8)	Arkansas (24-8)	Baylor (25-12)	Florida State (30-12)	Florida (34-14)	Florida (35-17)	Georgia Tech (34-15)	Florida (39-20)	Texas Christian (40-18)	12.
13.	Oklahoma State	Oklahoma State (6-1)	Coastal Carolina (12-1)	UC Irvine (10-5)	UC Irvine (12-6)	UC Irvine (16-7)	Baylor (20-8)	Baylor (23-10)	Oklahoma (29-11)	Mississippi (32-12)	Georgia (33-15)	Oklahoma (37-16)	Clemson (39-17)	Georgia Tech (35-17)	Florida (42-22)	13.
14.	Miami (FL)	Baylor (6-2)	UC Irvine (7-4)	Virginia (15-0)	Texas A&M (14-9)	Texas (17-7)	Virginia (26-5)	Virginia (28-7)	Virginia (30-8)	Miami (FL) (29-14)	Virginia (35-9)	Clemson (34-17)	Texas Christian (35-14)	Clemson (40-19)	Clemson (44-22)	14.
15.	San Diego	Coastal Carolina (6-1)	Texas Christian (9-2)	Arkansas (12-3)	Coastal Carolina (18-4)	Oklahoma State (19-7)	Texas A&M (20-11)	Coastal Carolina (29-7)	Mississippi (28-11)	Virginia (34-9)	Miami (FL) (31-16)	Georgia (34-17)	Virginia (39-12)	Texas Christian (36-16)	East Carolina (46-20)	15.
16.	Louisville	San Diego (6-3)	Oklahoma (12-3)	Oklahoma (17-4)	Mississippi (15-5)	Virginia (22-4)	East Carolina (25-5)	Mississippi (25-10)	Florida State (25-12)	Texas A&M (28-15)	Texas A&M (31-16)	Texas A&M (33-18)	East Carolina (41-15)	Coastal Carolina (46-14)	UC Irvine (45-15)	16.
17.	Baylor	Stanford (2-5)	Pepperdine (9-3)	Baylor (10-4)	Oklahoma State (15-7)	Clemson (18-7)	Mississippi (22-8)	East Carolina (26-9)	Texas A&M (25-14)	Clemson (30-15)	Oklahoma (34-14)	Arkansas (31-17)	Miami (FL) (35-18)	East Carolina (42-17)	Louisville (47-18)	17.
18.	UC Irvine	Texas Christian (5-1)	Florida State (7-5)	Texas Christian (10-4)	Virginia (19-2)	East Carolina (20-5)	Oklahoma State (21-10)	Clemson (23-12)	Cal Poly (27-9)	Cal Poly (29-10)	Kansas State (35-11)	Kansas State (38-13)	Alabama (37-17)	Louisville (44-15)	Georgia Tech (38-19)	18.
19.	Fresno State 1	Pepperdine (5-2)	Florida (9-4)	Clemson (11-4)	Texas Christian (13-6)	Coastal Carolina (19-7)	Coastal Carolina (24-7)	Oregon State (20-7)	Coastal Carolina (30-9)	Florida (31-14)	Clemson (32-16)	Alabama (35-15)	Coastal Carolina (42-13)	Miami (FL) (36-20)	Oklahoma (43-20)	19.
20.	Missouri	Florida (5-3)	Arkansas (9-2)	Mississippi (11-4)	Clemson (14-6)	Mississippi (16-8)	Clemson (20-10)	Florida State (21-11)	Clemson (26-14) т	Texas Christian (27-12)	Cal Poly (32-12)	Texas Christian (31-14)	Kansas State (39-15)	Kansas State (41-16)	Miami (FL) (38-22)	20.
21.	Pepperdine	Clemson (4-1)	Mississippi (7-3)	Pepperdine (11-5)	Pepperdine (16-6)	Florida (18-8)	San Diego (22-11)	Cal Poly (24-8)	Oregon State (23-9) т	Kansas State (31-11)	Texas Christian (29-13)	East Carolina (37-15)	Georgia (35-20)	Alabama (37-19)	South Carolina (40-23)	21.
22.	UCLA	Mississippi (3-3) т	Cal Poly (8-2)	UC Riverside (14-3)	Cal Poly (14-4)	Ohio State (20-4)	Oregon State (18-6)	Texas Christian (22-10)	Texas Christian (23-11)	East Carolina (32-13)	East Carolina (35-14)	Miami (FL) (32-18)	Texas A&M (34-21)	Georgia (37-22)	Kansas State (43-18)	22.
23.	Florida	Oklahoma (7-3) т	Virginia (12-0)	Cal Poly (11-4)	East Carolina (16-4)	Florida State (16-8)	Texas Christian (19-9)	Texas A&M (21-14)	Florida (26-14)	Oregon State (24-11)	Oregon State (27-12)	Coastal Carolina (39-13)	Arkansas (32-20)	Arkansas (34-22)	Coastal Carolina (47-16)	23.
24.	Coastal Carolina	East Carolina (5-1)	Clemson (6-4)	Florida State (9-6)	UC Riverside (14-4)	New Mexico (24-4)	Cal Poly (21-7)	San Diego (23-13)	East Carolina (28-12)	Baylor (25-17)	Coastal Carolina (36-13)	Cal Poly (33-15)	Cal Poly (35-17)	Missouri (34-25)	Georgia (38-24)	24.
25.	Clemson	Cal Poly (6-1)	South Carolina (8-1)	Florida (9-7)	Ohio State (17-2)	San Diego (19-10)	Florida State (18-10)	Florida (23-12)	Ohio State (29-8)	Coastal Carolina (32-12)	Alabama (32-15)	Oregon State (29-14)	Missouri (32-23)	Texas A&M (36-22)	Vanderbilt (37-27)	25.
	Preseason Jan 20	Week 2 Mar 2	Week 3 Mar 9	Week 4 Mar 16	Week 5 Mar 23	Week 6 Mar 30	Week 7 Apr 6	Week 8 Apr 13	Week 9 Apr 20	Week 10 Apr 27	Week 11 May 4	Week 12 May 11	Week 13 May 18	Week 14 May 25	Final Jun 25	
		Dropped: 16 Louisville; 19 Fresno State; 20 Missouri; 22 UCLA	Dropped: 16 San Diego; 17 Stanford; 24 East Carolina	Dropped: 25 South Carolina	Dropped: 24 Florida State; 25 Florida	Dropped: 19 Texas Christian; 21 Pepperdine; 22 Cal Poly; 24 UC Riverside	Dropped: 21 Florida State; 22 Ohio State; 24 New Mexico	Dropped: 18 Oklahoma State	None	Dropped: 25 Ohio State	Dropped: 24 Baylor	None	Dropped: 25 Oregon State	Dropped: 24 Cal Poly	Dropped: 21 Alabama; 24 Missouri; 25 Texas A&M	

== Baseball America ==
	Preseason Jan 15	Week 1 Feb 23	Week 2 Mar 2	Week 3 Mar 9	Week 4 Mar 16	Week 5 Mar 23	Week 6 Mar 30	Week 7 Apr 6	Week 8 Apr 13	Week 9 Apr 20	Week 10 Apr 27	Week 11 May 4	Week 12 May 11	Week 13 May 18	Week 14 May 25	Week 15 June 2	Week 16 June 9	Week 17 June 26	
1.	Texas A&M	Texas A&M (4–0)	LSU (7–0)	Texas (12–1)	Texas (14–2)	Cal State Fullerton (16–3)	Cal State Fullerton (18–4)	Arizona State (23–5)	LSU (26–9)	UC Irvine (26–10)	UC Irvine (30–11)	UC Irvine (34–11)	UC Irvine (37–11)	UC Irvine (40–12)	UC Irvine (43–13)	LSU (49–16)	LSU (51–16)	LSU (56–17)	1.
2.	LSU	LSU (3–0)	Texas (9–0)	North Carolina (10–2)	North Carolina (14–2)	LSU (17–5)	LSU (21–6)	LSU (23–8)	Rice (25–8)	Rice (27–10)	Rice (28–10)	Rice (31–11)	LSU (38–13)	LSU (41–15)	LSU (46–16)	Arizona State (47–12)	Arizona State (49–12)	Texas (50–16)	2.
3.	North Carolina	North Carolina (3–0)	North Carolina (7–1)	Texas A&M (11–3)	Texas A&M (13–4)	Arizona State (17–3)	Arizona State (19–4)	Rice (21–7)	UC Irvine (22–9)	Arizona State (28–8)	Arizona State (31–9)	LSU (36–12)	Arizona State (38–11)	Arizona State (41–11)	Arizona State (44–12)	Cal State Fullerton (45–14)	Cal State Fullerton (47–14)	Arizona State (51–14)	3.
4.	Texas	Texas (4–0)	Texas A&M (7–2)	LSU (10–2)	Cal State Fullerton (13–3)	Rice (14–6)	Rice (17–7)	North Carolina (24–7)	Arizona State (25–8)	North Carolina (31–10)	North Carolina (35–11)	North Carolina (35–11)	Rice (33–11)	Cal State Fullerton (38–14)	Cal State Fullerton (42–14)	Texas (44–13)	Texas (46–14)	Cal State Fullerton (47–16)	4.
5.	Cal State Fullerton	UC Irvine (3–1)	UC Irvine (5–2)	Baylor (10–2)	LSU (13–4)	North Carolina (17–4)	North Carolina (20–6)	UC Irvine (19–8)	North Carolina (27–9)	Texas (29–8)	LSU (33–11)	Arizona State (33–11)	Cal State Fullerton (36–13)	Texas (38–12)	Texas (41–13)	Virginia (46–12)	Virginia (48–130	Virginia (49–15)	5.
6.	Ole Miss	Baylor (2–1)	Baylor (6–2)	Cal State Fullerton (9–2)	Arizona State (14–3)	Georgia (19–2)	Georgia (22–3)	Cal State Fullerton (20–7)	Cal State Fullerton (22–9)	LSU (28–11)	Cal State Fullerton (29–11)	Cal State Fullerton (32–12)	Texas (35–12)	North Carolina (41–14)	Rice (39–15)	Rice (43–16)	North Carolina (47–16)	North Carolina (48–18)	6.
7.	Rice	Cal State Fullerton (1–2)	Cal State Fullerton (5–2)	Arizona State (11–1)	Rice (10–5)	Miami (FL) (18–4)	Baylor (17–6)	Baylor (20–8)	Baylor (23–10)	Georgia Tech (26–8)	Ole Miss (32–12)	Ole Miss (36–13)	Georgia Tech (33–12)	Ole Miss (40–15)	Virginia (43–12)	North Carolina (45–16)	Rice (43–18)	Arkansas (41–24)	7.
8.	Baylor	Arizona State (4–0)	Arizona State (8–1)	Georgia (12–0)	Georgia (15–2)	Baylor (14–5)	UC Irvine (16–7)	Georgia (25–5)	Georgia (29–6)	Georgia (31–8)	Texas (29–11)	Texas (33–11)	North Carolina (38–13)	Oklahoma (40–16)	North Carolina (42–16)	Florida State (45–16)	Arkansas (39–22)	Rice (43–18)	8.
9.	UC Irvine	UCLA (2–1)	Rice (5–2)	Rice (8–4)	Baylor (10–4)	Texas (14–6)	Texas (17–7)	Texas (20–8)	Texas (24–8)	Baylor (25–12)	Oklahoma (33–11)	Georgia Tech (31–11)	Ole Miss (37–15)	Florida (38–18)	Oklahoma (41–18)	UC Irvine (45–15)	Florida State (45–18)	Florida State (45–18)	9.
10.	Missouri	Rice (1–2)	Georgia (8–0)	UC Irvine (7–4)	UC Irvine (10–5)	UC Irvine (12–6)	Georgia Tech (18–4)	Miami (FL) (23–8)	Oklahoma (28–8)	Cal State Fullerton (24–11)	Georgia Tech (28–11)	Kansas State (35–11)	Virginia (37–10)	TCU (35–14)	Florida State (42–16)	Florida (42–20)	UC Irvine (45–15)	UC Irvine (45–15)	10.
11.	San Diego	San Diego (2–1)	San Diego (6–3)	Pepperdine (9–3)	Miami (FL) (14–3)	Ole Miss (15–5)	Miami (FL) (20–7)	Oklahoma (25–7)	Arkansas (24–8)	Ole Miss (28–11)	Georgia (33–11)	Florida (34–14)	Kansas State (38–13)	Rice (35–15)	Florida (39–20)	Ole Miss (43–18)	Southern Miss (40–24)	Southern Miss (40–24)	11.
12.	UCLA	Georgia (3–0)	Pepperdine (5–2)	TCU (9–2)	Ole Miss (11–4)	Oklahoma (20–5)	Oklahoma (22–6)	Arkansas (22–6)	Georgia Tech (21–8)	Arkansas (26–11)	Arkansas (29–12)	Cal Poly (32–12)	Alabama (35–15)	Florida State (40–15)	Ole Miss (40–17)	TCU (39–16)	Florida (42–22)	Florida (42–22)	12.
13.	Arizona State	Ole Miss (1–2)	TCU (5–1)	Miami (FL) (10–2)	Oklahoma (17–4)	Georgia Tech (16–2)	Arkansas (19–5)	Georgia Tech (19–6)	Miami (FL) (25–10)	Oklahoma (29–11)	Cal Poly (29–10)	Virginia (35–9)	Florida (35–17)	Clemson (39–17)	TCU (36–16)	Louisville (47–16)	Ole Miss (44–20)	Ole Miss (44–20)	13.
14.	Georgia	Stanford (2–1)	Ole Miss (3–3)	Ole Miss (7–3)	Georgia Tech (12–1)	Arkansas (16–4)	Texas A&M (18–9)	Ole Miss (22–8)	Oregon State (20–7)	Cal Poly (27–9)	Virginia (34–9)	Texas A&M (31–16)	TCU (31–14)	Georgia Tech (34–15)	Kansas State (41–16)	Clemson (44–20)	TCU (40–18)	TCU (40–18)	14.
15.	Stanford	Missouri (1–3)	Miami (FL) (6–1)	Oklahoma (12–3)	Coastal Carolina (15–1)	Texas A&M (14–9)	Ole Miss (16–8)	East Carolina (25–5)	San Diego State (25–12)	Virginia (30–8)	TCU (27–12)	TCU (29–13)	Oklahoma (37–16)	East Carolina (41–15)	Louisville (44–15)	East Carolina (46–18)	Louisville (47–18)	Louisville (47–18)	15.
16.	Oklahoma	Oklahoma (4–0)	Oklahoma (7–3)	Georgia Tech (9–1)	Arkansas (12–3)	TCU (13–6)	East Carolina (20–5)	Oregon State (18–6)	TCU (22–10)	Tcu 923–11)	Kansas State (31–11)	Florida State (33–12)	Texas A&M (33–18)	Virginia (39–12)	Clemson (40–19)	Arkansas (37–22)	Clemson (44–22)	Clemson (44–22)	16.
17.	Pepperdine	Pepperdine (2–1)	Kent State (5–0)	Coastal Carolina (12–1)	Pepperdine (11–5)	Pepperdine (16–6)	Oklahoma State (19–7)	Texas A&M (20–11)	Ole Miss (25–10)	Oregon State (23–9)	Baylor (25–17)	Arkansas (31–14)	Florida State (36–14)	Kansas State (39–15)	Georgia Tech (35–17)	Oklahoma (43–20)	East Carolina (46–20)	East Carolina (46–20)	17.
18.	Kent State	Kent State (3–0)	Georgia Tech (6–1)	Arkansas (9–2)	TCU (10–4)	Coastal Carolina (18–4)	New Mexico (24–4)	San Diego State (22–11)	Cal Poly (24–8)	Miami (FL) (26–13)	Miami (FL) (29–14)	Oklahoma (34–14)	Cal Poly (33–15)	Alabama (37–17)	East Carolina (42–17)	Kansas State (43–18)	Oklahoma (43–20)	Oklahoma (43–20)	18.
19.	Clemson	Clemson (3–0)	Clemson (4–1)	Oklahoma State (9–2)	Oklahoma State (13–4)	Cal Poly (14–4)	Oregon State (15–6)	TCU (19–9)	Virginia (28–7)	San Diego State (26–15)	Florida State (30–12)	Miami (FL) (31–16)	Clemson (34–17)	Cal Poly (35–17)	Gonzaga (35–16)	Southern Miss (38–24)	Kansas State (43–18)	Kansas State (43–18)	19.
20.	Georgia Tech	Georgia Tech (3–0)	Coastal Carolina (6–1)	San Diego (8–6)	Clemson (11–4)	UC Santa Barbara (12–4)	Florida (18–8)	Oklahoma State (21–10)	Coastal Carolina (29–7)	Hawaii (24–13)	Texas A&M (28–15)	Clemson (32–16)	East Carolina (37–15)	Louisville (40–14)	Alabama (37–19)	Georgia Tech (38–19)	Georgia Tech (38–19)	Georgia Tech (38–19)	20.
21.	Alabama	Arkansas (3–0)	Arkansas (5–1)	Kent State (7–2)	Cal Poly (11–4)	New Mexico (22–3)	San Diego State (18–9)	Cal Poly (21–7)	Kansas State (26–9)	Florida State (25–12)	Clemson (30–15)	Alabama (32–15)	Minnesota (33–14)	Minnesota (35–15)	Minnesota (38–17)	Minnesota (40–19)	Minnesota (40–19)	Minnesota (40–19)	21.
22.	Arkansas	Florida State (4–0)	Florida State (6–1)	Clemson (6–4)	UC Santa Barbara (12–4)	East Carolina (16–4)	TCU (15–9)	Virginia (26–5)	Gonzaga (23–10)	Alabama (27–13)	Alabama (29–15)	Georgia (33–15)	Elon (36–14)	Elon (37–14)	Elon (40–16)	Gonzaga (36–18)	Gonzaga (36–18)	Gonzaga (36–18)	22.
23.	Louisville	TCU (2–1)	Oklahoma State (6–1)	Oregon State (7–3)	Virginia (15–0)	Oklahoma State (15–7)	Cal Poly (17–7)	Hawaii (19–10)	East Carolina (26–9)	Kansas State (28–11)	Kent State (32–9)	Kansas (33–16)	Louisville (36–14)	Miami (FL) (35–18)	Missouri (34–24)	Western Kentucky (42–20)	Western Kentucky (42–20)	Western Kentucky (42–20)	23.
24.	Florida State	Florida (3–0)	Oregon State (4–2)	Cal Poly (8–2)	Alabama (11–5)	Virginia (19–2)	Virginia (22–4)	Coastal Carolina (24–7)	Kansas (23–12)	Texas A&M (25–14)	Florida (31–14)	East Carolina (35–14)	Miami (FL) (32–18)	Missouri (32–23)	Coastal Carolina (46–14)	Elon (41–18)	Elon (41–18)	Elon (41–18)	24.
25.	Oregon State	Oklahoma State (4–0)	Cal Poly (6–1)	UC Santa Barbara (9–2)	Minnesota (10–3)	Minnesota (13–6)	Minnesota (14–7)	San Diego (22–11)	Minnesota (20–10)	Kent State (28–8)	East Carolina (32–13)	Oregon State (27–12)	Missouri (30–23)	South Carolina (37–19)	Middle Tennessee (43–16)	South Carolina (40–23)	South Carolina (40–23)	South Carolina (40–23)	25.
	Preseason Jan 15	Week 1 Feb 23	Week 2 Mar 2	Week 3 Mar 9	Week 4 Mar 16	Week 5 Mar 23	Week 6 Mar 30	Week 7 Apr 6	Week 8 Apr 13	Week 9 Apr 20	Week 10 Apr 27	Week 11 May 4	Week 12 May 11	Week 13 May 18	Week 14 May 25	Week 15 June 2	Week 16 June 9	Week 17 June 26	
		Dropped: 21 Alabama; 23 Louisville; 25 Oregon State	Dropped: 9 UCLA; 14 Stanford; 15 Missouri; 24 Florida	Dropped: 22 Florida State	Dropped: 20 San Diego; 21 Kent State; 23 Oregon State	Dropped: 20 Clemson; 24 Alabama	Dropped: 17 Pepperdine; 18 Coastal Carolina; 20 UC Santa Barbara	Dropped: 18 New Mexico; 20 Florida; 25 Minnesota	Dropped: 17 Texas A&M; 20 Oklahoma State; 23 Hawaii; 25 San Diego	Dropped: 20 Coastal Carolina; 22 Gonzaga; 23 East Carolina; 24 Kansas; 25 Minnesota	Dropped: 17 Oregon State; 19 San Diego State; 20 Hawaii	Dropped: 17 Baylor; 23 Kent State	Dropped: 17 Arkansas; 22 Georgia; 23 Kansas; 25 Oregon State	Dropped: 16 Texas A&M	Dropped: 19 Cal Poly; 23 Miami (FL); 25 South Carolina	Dropped: 20 Alabama; 23 Missouri; 24 Coastal Carolina; 25 Middle Tennessee	None	None	

== Collegiate Baseball ==
	Preseason Dec 22	Week 1 Feb 23	Week 2 Mar 2	Week 3 Mar 9	Week 4 Mar 16	Week 5 Mar 23	Week 6 Mar 30	Week 7 Apr 6	Week 8 Apr 13	Week 9 Apr 20	Week 10 Apr 27	Week 11 May 4	Week 12 May 11	Week 13 May 18	Week 14 May 25	Week 15 June 2	Week 16 June 8	Week 17 June 25	
1.	LSU	LSU (3–0)	LSU (7–0)	Georgia (12–0)	North Carolina (14–2)	Georgia (19–2)	Georgia (22–3)	Arkansas (22–6)	LSU (26–9)	UC Irvine (26–10)	UC Irvine (30–11)	UC Irvine (34–11)	UC Irvine (37–11)	UC Irvine (40–12)	UC Irvine (43–13)	LSU (49–16)	LSU (51–16)	LSU (56–17)	1.
2.	North Carolina	North Carolina (3–0)	Georgia (8–0)	North Carolina (10–2)	Texas (14–2)	Cal State Fullerton (16–3)	Cal State Fullerton (18–4)	Arizona State (23–5)	Georgia (29–6)	Arizona State (28–8)	Arizona State (31–9)	North Carolina (35–11)	LSU (38–14)	LSU (41–15)	LSU (46–16)	Arizona State (47–12)	Arizona State (49–12)	Texas (50–16–1)	2.
3.	Rice	Georgia (3–0)	North Carolina (7–1)	LSU (10–2)	Georgia Tech (12–1)	Georgia Tech (16–2)	Georgia Tech (18–4)	North Carolina (24–7)	Rice (25–8)	North Carolina (31–10)	North Carolina (35–11)	LSU (36–13)	Arizona State (38–11)	Arizona State (41–11)	Arizona State (44–12)	Cal State Fullerton (45–14)	Cal State Fullerton (47–14)	Arizona State (51–14)	3.
4.	Georgia	Arizona State (4–0)	Texas (9–0)	Texas (12–1)	Georgia (15–2)	LSU (17–5)	Arkansas (19–5)	LSU (23–8)	UC Irvine (22–9)	Georgia Tech (26–8–1)	LSU (33–120	Arizona State (33–11)	North Carolina (38–13)	North Carolina (41–14)	Cal State Fullerton (42–14)	Texas (44–13–1)	North Carolina (47–16)	Arkansas (41–24)	4.
5.	Stanford	Florida State (4–0)	Arizona State (8–1)	Arizona State (11–1)	Cal State Fullerton (13–3)	North Carolina (17–4)	LSU (21–6)	Georgia (25–5)	Arkansas (24–8)	Georgia (31–8)	Cal State Fullerton (29–11)	Cal State Fullerton (32–12)	Cal State Fullerton (36–13)	Cal State Fullerton (38–14)	Texas (41–13–1)	Florida State (45–16)	Texas (46–14–1)	North Carolina (48–18)	5.
6.	Arizona State	Texas A&M (4–0)	Florida State (5–1)	Georgia Tech (9–1)	LSU (13–4)	Miami (FL) (18–4)	North Carolina (20–6)	Rice (21–7)	Arizona State (25–8)	Texas (29–8)	Georgia (33–11)	Florida State (33–12)	Texas (36–12–1)	Texas (38–12–1)	Florida State (42–16)	North Carolina (45–16)	Virginia (48–13–1)	Virginia (49–15–1)	6.
7.	Florida State	Stanford (2–1)	Rice (5–2)	Cal State Fullerton (9–2)	Virginia (15–0)	Arizona State (17–3)	Arizona State (19–4)	UC Irvine (19–8)	North Carolina (27–9)	Arkansas (26–11)	Arkansas (29–12)	Rice (31–11)	Florida State (36–14)	Florida State (40–14)	North Carolina (42–16)	Rice (43–16)	Arkansas (39–22)	Cal State Fullerton (47–16)	7.
8.	Louisville	Texas (4–0)	Texas A&M (7–2)	Miami (FL) (10–2)	Arizona State (14–3	Virginia (19–2)	Rice (17–7)	Cal State Fullerton (20–7)	Cal State Fullerton (22–9)	Rice (27–10)	Rice (28–10)	Texas (33–11–1)	Georgia Tech (33–12–1)	Ole Miss (40–15)	Rice (39–15)	Ole Miss (43–18)	Southern Miss (40–24)	Southern Miss (40–26)	8.
9.	Texas A&M	Georgia Tech (3–0)	Georgia Tech (6–1)	Texas A&M (11–3)	Miami (FL) (14–3)	Arkansas (16–4)	Miami (FL) (20–7)	Georgia Tech (19–6)	Oklahoma (28–8)	LSU (28–12)	Florida State (30–12)	Florida (34–14)	Rice (33–13)	Florida (38–18)	Ole Miss (40–17)	Florida (42–20)	UC Irvine (45–15)	UC Irvine (45–15)	9.
10.	Texas	Rice (1–2)	Miami (FL) (6–1)	Rice (8–4)	Texas A&M (13–4)	Rice (14–6)	Virginia (22–4)	Miami (FL) (23–8)	Georgia Tech (21–8–1)	Cal State Fullerton (24–11)	Georgia Tech (28–11–1)	Georgia Tech (31–11–1)	Alabama (35–15)	Oklahoma (40–16)	Florida (39–20)	Virginia (46–12–1)	Florida State (45–18)	Florida State (45–18)	10.
11.	Ole Miss	Oklahoma State (4–0)	TCU (5–1)	TCU (9–2)	Rice (10–5)	Baylor (14–5)	Baylor (17–6)	Virginia (26–5)	Texas (24–8)	Virginia (30–8–1)	Virginia (34–9–1)	Virginia (35–9–1)	Florida (35–17)	Rice (35–15)	Oklahoma (41–18)	UC Irvine (45–15)	Rice (43–18)	Rice (43–18)	11.
12.	Georgia Tech	Florida (3–0)	Cal State Fullerton (5–2)	Oklahoma State (9–2)	Oklahoma State (13–4)	Cal Poly (14–4)	UC Irvine (16–7)	Oklahoma (25–7)	Miami (FL) (25–10)	Cal Poly (27–9)	Ole Miss (32–120	Ole Miss (36–13)	Virginia (37–10–1)	Alabama (37–17)	Louisville (44–15)	Louisville (47–16)	Ole Miss (44–20)	Ole Miss (44–20)	12.
13.	Cal State Fullerton	Baylor (2–1)	Oklahoma State (6–1)	Baylor (10–2)	Coastal Carolina (15–1)	UC Irvine (12–6)	Oklahoma (22–6)	Baylor (20–8)	Virginia (28–7–1)	Ole Miss (28–11)	Cal Poly (29–10)	Arkansas (31–14)	Ole Miss (37–15)	Clemson (39–17)	Virginia (43–12–1)	Clemson (44–20)	Florida (42–22)	Florida (42–22)	13.
14.	Oklahoma State	Miami (FL) (3–1)	Baylor (6–2)	Coastal Carolina (12–1)	TCU (10–4)	Ole Miss (15–5)	Texas (17–7)	Texas (20–8)	Baylor (23–10)	Oklahoma (29–11)	Oklahoma (33–11)	Georgia (33–15)	Missouri (30–23)	Georgia Tech (34–15–1)	Alabama (37–19)	East Carolina (46–18)	Louisville (47–18)	Louisville (47–18)	14.
15.	Baylor	UC Irvine (3–1)	UC Irvine (5–2)	Cal Poly (8–2)	Baylor (10–4)	Oklahoma (20–5)	Oklahoma State (19–7)	Ole Miss (22–8)	Cal Poly (24–8)	Florida State (25–12)	Texas A&M (28–15)	Texas A&M (31–16)	Georgia (34–17)	Missouri (32–23)	Clemson (40–19)	TCU (39–16)	Clemson (44–22)	Clemson (44–22)	15.
16.	Fresno State	TCU (2–1)	Coastal Carolina (6–1)	UC Irvine (7–4)	Cal Poly (11–4)	Ohio State (17–2)	Cal Poly (17–7)	Cal Poly (21–7)	Oregon State (20–7)	Texas A&M (25–14)	Texas (29–11–1)	Cal Poly (32–12)	Arkansas (31–17)	Miami (FL) (35–18)	Georgia Tech (35–17–1)	Arkansas (37–22)	East Carolina (46–20)	East Carolina (46–20)	16.
17.	San Diego	Cal State Fullerton (1–2)	Cal Poly (6–1)	South Carolina (8–1)	UC Irvine (10–5)	Texas (14–6)	Ole Miss (16–8)	Oregon State (18–6)	TCU (22–10)	Baylor (25–12)	Florida (31–14)	Kansas State (35–11–1)	Clemson (34–17)	Louisville (40–14)	Missouri (34–25)	Southern Miss (38–24)	TCU (40–18)	TCU (40–18)	17.
18.	Miami (FL)	Coastal Carolina (3–1)	South Carolina (4–0)	Virginia (12–0)	Clemson (11–4)	TCU (13–6)	Ohio State (20–4)	TCU (19–9)	Coastal Carolina (29–7)	Miami (FL) (26–13)	Miami (FL) (29–14)	Oregon State (27–12)	Kansas State (38–13–1)	East Carolina (41–15)	Miami (FL) (36–20)	Georgia Tech (38–19–1)	Georgia Tech (38–19–1)	Georgia Tech (38–19–1)	18.
19.	Kentucky	Fresno State (2–1)	Clemson (4–1)	Florida (9–4)	Illinois (11–2)	Oklahoma State (15–7)	Florida (18–8)	Coastal Carolina (24–7)	Ole Miss (25–10)	Oregon State (23–9)	Clemson (30–15)	Clemson (32–16)	Texas A&M (33–18)	TCU (35–14)	East Carolina (42–17)	Oklahoma (43–20)	Oklahoma (43–20)	Oklahoma (43–20)	19.
20.	UC Irvine	Oklahoma (4–0)	Florida (5–3)	Ole Miss (7–3)	Ole Miss (11–4)	New Mexico (22–3)	New Mexico (24–4)	Oklahoma State (21–10)	Florida (23–12)	TCU (23–11)	TCU (27–12)	Miami (FL) (31–16)	Oklahoma (37–16)	South Carolina (37–19)	Coastal Carolina (46–14)	Miami (FL) (38–22)	Miami (FL) (38–22)	Miami (FL) (38–22)	20.
21.	UCLA	UCLA (2–1)	Ole Miss (3–3)	Illinois (7–2)	Oklahoma (17–4)	Coastal Carolina (18–4)	Texas A&M (18–9)	Texas A&M (20–11)	Clemson (23–12)	Alabama (27–13)	Kent State (32–9)	Oklahoma (34–14)	Miami (FL) (32–18)	Virginia (39–12–1)	TCU (36–16)	South Carolina (40–23)	South Carolina (40–23)	South Carolina (40–23)	21.
22.	Missouri	Ole Miss (1–2)	Pepperdine (5–2)	Pepperdine (9–3)	Ohio State (13–2)	Clemson (14–6)	Clemson (18–7)	Florida (19–11)	Florida State (21–11)	Florida (26–14)	Oregon State (24–11)	TCU (29–13)	Cal Poly (33–15)	Kansas State (39–15–1)	South Carolina (38–21)	Kansas State (43–18–1)	Kansas State (43–18–1)	Kansas State (43–18–1)	22.
23.	Pepperdine	Pepperdine (2–1)	Lamar (9–1)	Lamar (12–2)	Arkansas (12–3)	Florida (14–7)	Oregon State (15–6)	New Mexico State (28–4)	Minnesota (20–10)	Coastal Carolina (30–9)	Alabama (29–15)	Alabama (32–15)	TCU (31–14)	Ohio State (39–15)	Kansas State (41–16–1)	Western Kentucky (42–20)	Western Kentucky (42–20)	Western Kentucky (42–20)	23.
24.	Southern California	Southern California (2–1)	East Carolina (5–1)	UC Santa Barbara (9–2)	Alabama (11–5)	New Mexico State (20–3)	New Mexico State (25–3)	East Carolina (25–5)	Kent State (24–7)	Ohio State (29–8)	Kansas State (31–11–1)	Kansas (33–16)	Minnesota (33–14)	Minnesota (35–15)	Washington State (31–23)	Oregon State (37–19)	Oregon State (37–19)	Oregon State (37–19)	24.
25.	Florida	Clemson (3–0)	Ohio State (7–0)	San Jose State (9–0)	Mississippi State (12–5)	Illinois (12–4)	San Diego State (18–9)	George Mason (24–5)	George Mason (28–6)	Kent State (28–8)	South Florida (27–15)	Illinois (30–13)	Texas State (37–12)	Cal Poly (35–17)	Oregon State (35–17)	Ohio State (42–19)	Ohio State (42–19)	Ohio State (42–19)	25.
26.	Clemson	San Diego State (2–1)	Mississippi State (8–1)	East Carolina (8–2)	Kansas State (15–3)	Alabama (15–7)	Illinois (16–5)	Georgia Southern (21–7)	West Virginia (25–7)	Clemson (26–14)	Texas State (31–10)	Kent State (35–11)	Indiana State (33–14)	Coastal Carolina (42–13)	Cal Poly (37–19)	Minnesota (40–19)	Minnesota (40–19)	Minnesota (40–19)	26.
27.	Notre Dame	San Diego (2–1)	Oklahoma (7–3)	Oklahoma (12–3)	South Carolina (11–4)	Pepperdine (16–6)	TCU (15–9)	Eastern Illinois (21–5)	Georgia Southern (24–8)	George Mason (30–7)	Ohio State (31–10)	Ohio State (34–11)	South Florida (31–19)	Washington State (28–22)	Minnesota (38–17)	Oklahoma State (34–24)	Oklahoma State (34–24)	Oklahoma State (34–24)	27.
28.	Coastal Carolina	Michigan (4–0)	Michigan (7–2)	Michigan (10–2)	Pepperdine (11–5)	South Carolina (14–6)	South Carolina (18–7)	San Diego State (22–11)	Vanderbilt (21–13)	Georgia Southern (30–7)	Illinois (26–12)	South Florida (30–17)	Louisville (36–14)	Missouri State (32–19)	Texas State (41–15)	Alabama (37–21)	Alabama (37–21)	Alabama (37–21)	28.
29.	Michigan	Kentucky (2–2)	Kentucky (4–2)	Kentucky (9–2)	Lamar (15–4)	UC Santa Barbara (13–4)	East Carolina (20–5)	San Diego (22–11)	Eastern Illinois (24–6)	South Florida (24–14)	George Mason (34–8)	George Mason (38–9)	George Mason (38–9)	Texas State (38–14)	Texas A&M (36–22)	Vanderbilt (37–27)	Vanderbilt (37–27)	Vanderbilt (37–27)	29.
30.	UC Santa Barbara	Ohio State (3–0)	San Diego (6–3)	Ohio State (9–2)	UC Santa Barbara (12–4)	College of Charleston (17–3)	San Diego (19–10)	Minnesota (16–9)	San Diego State (25–12)	Missouri State (23–14)	East Carolina (32–13)	East Carolina (35–14)	East Carolina (37–15)	George Mason (40–10)	Elon (40–16)	Coastal Carolina (47–16)	Coastal Carolina (47–16)	Coastal Carolina (47–16)	30.
	Preseason Dec 22	Week 1 Feb 23	Week 2 Mar 2	Week 3 Mar 9	Week 4 Mar 16	Week 5 Mar 23	Week 6 Mar 30	Week 7 Apr 6	Week 8 Apr 13	Week 9 Apr 20	Week 10 Apr 27	Week 11 May 4	Week 12 May 11	Week 13 May 18	Week 14 May 25	Week 15 June 2	Week 16 June 8	Week 17 June 25	
		Dropped: 8 Louisville; 22 Missouri; 27 Notre Dame; 30 UC Santa Barbara	Dropped: 7 Stanford; 19 Fresno State; 21 UCLA; 24 Southern California; 26 San Diego State	Dropped: 6 Florida State; 19 Clemson; 26 Mississippi State; 30 San Diego	Dropped: 19 Florida; 25 San Jose State; 26 East Carolina; 28 Michigan; 29 Kentucky	Dropped: 10 Texas A&M; 25 Mississippi State; 26 Kansas State; 29 Lamar	Dropped: 21 Coastal Carolina; 26 Alabama; 27 Pepperdine; 29 UC Santa Barbara; 30 College of Charleston	Dropped: 18 Ohio State; 20 New Mexico; 22 Clemson; 26 Illinois; 28 South Carolina	Dropped: 20 Oklahoma State; 21 Texas A&M; 23 New Mexico State; 24 East Carolina; 29 San Diego	Dropped: 23 Minnesota; 26 West Virginia; 28 Vanderbilt; 29 Eastern Illinois; 30 San Diego State	Dropped: 17 Baylor; 23 Coastal Carolina; 28 Georgia Southern; 30 Missouri State	Dropped: 26 Texas State	Dropped: 18 Oregon State; 24 Kansas; 25 Illinois; 26 Kent State; 27 Ohio State	Dropped: 15 Georgia; 16 Arkansas; 19 Texas A&M; 26 Indiana State; 27 South Florida	Dropped: 23 Ohio State; 28 Missouri State; 30 George Mason	Dropped: 17 Missouri; 24 Washington State; 26 Cal Poly; 28 Texas State; 29 Texas A&M; 30 Elon	None	None	

== National College Baseball Writers' Association ==
	Preseason Jan 12	Week 1 Feb 23	Week 2 Mar 2	Week 3 Mar 9	Week 4 Mar 16	Week 5 Mar 23	Week 6 Mar 30	Week 7 Apr 6	Week 8 Apr 13	Week 9 Apr 20	Week 10 Apr 27	Week 11 May 4	Week 12 May 11	Week 13 May 18	Week 14 May 25	Week 15 June 2	Week 16 June 9	Week 17 June 25	
1.	North Carolina	North Carolina (3–0)	LSU (7–0)	Georgia (12–0)	North Carolina (14–2)	Georgia (19–2)	Georgia (22–3)	Arizona State (23–5)	LSU (26–9)	North Carolina (31–10)	North Carolina (35–11)	North Carolina (35–11)	UC Irvine (37–11)	UC Irvine (40–12)	UC Irvine (43–13)	LSU (49–16)	LSU (51–16)	LSU (56–17)	1.
2.	LSU	LSU (3–0)	Georgia (8–0)	North Carolina (10–2)	Texas (14–2)	Miami (FL) (18–4)	Cal State Fullerton (18–4)	North Carolina (24–7)	Georgia (29–6)	Texas (29–8)	Arizona State (31–9)	UC Irvine (31–11)	LSU (38–14)	LSU (41–15)	LSU (46–16)	Arizona State (47–12)	Arizona State (49–12)	Texas (50–16–1)	2.
3.	Rice	Texas A&M (4–0)	North Carolina (7–1)	Texas (12–1)	Georgia (15–2)	Georgia Tech (16–2)	Georgia Tech (18–4)	LSU (23–8)	Rice (25–8)	Arizona State (28–8)	Rice (28–10)	Rice (31–11)	Arizona State (38–11)	Arizona State (41–11)	Arizona State (44–12)	Cal State Fullerton (45–14)	Cal State Fullerton (47–14)	Arizona State (51–14)	3.
4.	Texas A&M	Georgia (3–0)	Texas (9–0)	Arizona State (11–1)	Miami (FL) (14–3)	Cal State Fullerton (16–3)	Arizona State (19–4)	Georgia (25–5)	North Carolina (27–9)	Georgia (31–8)	UC Irvine (30–11)	LSU (36–13)	Cal State Fullerton (36–13)	North Carolina (41–14)	Cal State Fullerton (42–14)	Texas (44–13–1)	North Carolina (47–16)	North Carolina (48–18)	4.
5.	Georgia	Florida State (4–0)	Arizona State (8–1)	LSU (10–2)	Georgia Tech (12–1)	North Carolina (17–4)	LSU (21–6)	Miami (FL) (23–8)	Arizona State (25–8)	Rice (27–10)	LSU (33–12)	Arizona State (33–11)	North Carolina (38–13)	Cal State Fullerton (38–14)	Texas (41–13–1)	North Carolina (45–16)	Texas (46–14–1)	Arkansas (41–24)	5.
6.	Florida State	Arizona State (4–0)	Florida State (6–1)	Texas A&M (11–3)	Texas A&M (13–4)	Arizona State (17–3)	North Carolina (20–6)	Cal State Fullerton (20–7)	Texas (24–8)	UC Irvine (26–10)	Cal State Fullerton (29–11)	Cal State Fullerton (32–12)	Rice (33–13)	Texas (38–12–1)	Rice (39–15)	Rice (43–16)	Virginia (48–13–1)	Virginia (49–15–1)	6.
7.	Arizona State	Texas (4–0)	Texas A&M (7–2)	Miami (FL) (10–2)	Cal State Fullerton (13–3)	LSU (17–5)	Miami (FL) (20–7)	Rice (21–7)	UC Irvine (22–9)	LSU (28–12)	Georgia (33–11)	Ole Miss (36–13)	Texas (36–12–1)	Florida State (40–14)	North Carolina (42–16)	Florida State (45–16)	Arkansas (39–22)	Cal State Fullerton (47–16)	7.
8.	Texas	Georgia Tech (3–0)	Rice (5–2)	Georgia Tech (9–1)	Arizona State (14–3)	Rice (14–6)	Rice (17–7)	Georgia Tech (19–6)	Cal State Fullerton (22–9)	Georgia Tech (26–8–1)	Ole Miss (32–12)	Texas (33–11–1)	Georgia Tech (33–12–1)	Ole Miss (40–15)	Florida State (42–16)	Virginia (46–12–1)	Southern Miss (40–24)	Southern Miss (40–26)	8.
9.	Stanford	Rice (1–2)	Miami (FL) (6–1)	Cal State Fullerton (9–2)	LSU (13–4)	Texas (14–6)	Texas (17–7)	Texas (20–8)	Miami (FL) (25–10)	Cal State Fullerton (24–11)	Florida State (30–12)	Florida State (33–12)	Florida State (36–14)	Rice (35–15)	Virginia (43–12–1)	Florida (42–20)	Rice (43–18)	Rice (43–18)	9.
10.	Cal State Fullerton	Miami (FL) (3–1)	Georgia Tech (6–1)	Rice (8–4)	Rice (10–5)	Oklahoma (20–5)	Oklahoma (22–6)	UC Irvine (19–8)	Oklahoma (28–8)	Florida State (25–12)	Texas (29–11–1)	Georgia Tech (31–11–1)	Virginia (37–10–1)	Oklahoma (40–16)	Oklahoma (41–18)	TCU (39–16)	Florida State (45–18)	Florida State (45–18)	10.
11.	Louisville	Stanford (2–1)	Oklahoma State (6–1)	Oklahoma State (9–2)	Coastal Carolina (15–1)	Baylor (14–5)	Baylor (17–6)	Oklahoma (25–7)	Georgia Tech (21–8–1)	Ole Miss (28–11)	Oklahoma (33–11)	Arkansas (31–14)	Ole Miss (37–15)	Florida (38–18)	Florida (39–20)	UC Irvine (45–15)	TCU (40–18)	TCU (40–18)	11.
12.	Miami (FL)	Oklahoma State (4–0)	Cal State Fullerton (5–2)	Coastal Carolina (12–1)	Oklahoma State (13–4)	UC Irvine (12–6)	UC Irvine (16–7)	Arkansas (22–6)	Arkansas (24–8)	Miami (FL) (26–13)	Arkansas (29–12)	Florida (34–14)	Florida (35–17)	TCU (35–14)	Ole Miss (40–17)	Ole Miss (43–18)	Ole Miss (44–20)	Ole Miss (44–20)	12.
13.	Georgia Tech	Florida (3–0)	UC Irvine (5–2)	Baylor (10–2)	UC Irvine (10–5)	Texas A&M (14–9)	Texas A&M (18–9)	Baylor (20–8)	Baylor (23–10)	Arkansas (26–11)	Miami (FL) 29–14)	Georgia (33–15)	Oklahoma (37–16)	Georgia (Tech (34–15–1)	TCU (36–16)	Clemson (44–20)	UC Irvine (45–15)	UC Irvine (45–15)	13.
14.	Ole Miss	UC Irvine (3–1)	Coastal Carolina (6–1)	Florida State (7–5)	Oklahoma (17–4)	Ole Miss (15–5)	Arkansas (19–5)	East Carolina (25–5)	Coastal Carolina (29–7)	Oklahoma (29–11)	Georgia Tech (28–11–1)	Virginia (35–9–1)	TCU (31–14)	Virginia (39–12–1)	Georgia Tech (35–17–1)	East Carolina (46–18)	Florida (42–22)	Florida (42–22)	14.
15.	UC Irvine	Fresno State (2–1)	Baylor (6–2)	UC Irvine (7–4)	Baylor (10–4)	Coastal Carolina (18–4(	Oklahoma State (19–7)	Ole Miss (22–8)	Florida State (21–11)	Baylor (25–12)	Virginia (34–9–1)	Miami (FL) (31–16)	Texas A&M (33–18)	Clemson (39–17)	Coastal Carolina (46–14)	Louisville (47–16)	Clemson (44–22)	Clemson (44–22)	15.
16.	Oklahoma State	Cal State Fullerton (1–2)	San Diego (6–3)	Pepperdine (9–3)	Clemson (11–4)	Arkansas (16–4)	East Carolina (20–5)	Texas A&M (20–11)	Ole Miss (25–10)	Virginia (30–8–1)	Cal Poly (29–10)	Texas A&M (31–16)	Clemson (34–17)	Miami (FL) (35–18)	Clemson (40–19)	Arkansas (37–22)	East Carolina (46–20)	East Carolina (46–20)	16.
17.	Fresno State	San Diego (2–1)	Florida (5–3)	TCU (9–2)	Florida State (9–6)	Pepperdine (16–6)	Ole Miss (16–8)	Oklahoma State (21–10)	Virginia (28–7–1)	Cal Poly (27–9)	Texas A&M (29–15)	Oklahoma (34–14)	Arkansas (31–17)	East Carolina (41–15)	Miami (FL) (36–20)	Oklahoma (43–20)	Louisville (47–18)	Louisville (47–18)	17.
18.	San Diego	Coastal Carolina (3–1)	Clemson (4–1)	Florida (9–4)	Ole Miss (11–4)	Oklahoma State (15–7)	Clemson (18–7)	Virginia (26–5)	Clemson (23–12)	Texas A&M (25–14)	TCU (27–12)	TCU (29–13)	Georgia (34–17)	Coastal Carolina (42–13)	Texas A&M (36–22)	Georgia Tech (38–19–1)	Oklahoma (43–20)	Oklahoma (43–20)	18.
19.	Baylor	Clemson (3–0)	Pepperdine (5–2)	Oklahoma (12–3)	Pepperdine (11–5)	East Carolina (16–4)	Florida State (16–8)	Coastal Carolina (24–7)	Cal Poly (24–8)	Coastal Carolina (30–9)	Clemson (30–15)	Cal Poly (32–12)	Alabama (35–15)	Texas A&M (34–21)	East Carolina (42–17)	Miami (FL) (38–22)	Georgia Tech (38–19–1)	Georgia Tech (38–19–1)	19.
20.	Missouri	Baylor (2–1)	East Carolina (5–1)	East Carolina (8–2)	Arkansas (12–3)	Clemson (14–6)	Florida (18–8)	Florida State (18–10)	East Carolina (26–9)	TCU (23–11)	Florida (31–14)	Clemson (32–16)	East Carolina (37–15)	Arkansas (32–20)	Louisville (44–15)	Southern Miss (38–24)	Miami (FL) (38–22)	Miami (FL) (38–22)	20.
21.	Pepperdine	Pepperdine (2–1)	TCU (5–1)	Clemson (6–4)	Virginia (15–0)	Virginia (19–2)	Virginia (22–4)	San Diego (22–11)	TCU (22–10)	Clemson (26–14)	East Carolina (32–13)	Kansas State (35–11–1)	Miami (FL) (32–18)	Alabama (37–17)	Arkansas (34–22)	Coastal Carolina (47–16)	Coastal Carolina (47–16)	Coastal Carolina (47–16)	21.
22.	Coastal Carolina	Oklahoma (4–0)	Oklahoma (7–3)	Ole Miss (7–3)	TCU (10–4)	Florida State (11–8)	Coastal Carolina (19–7)	Clemson (20–10)	Florida (23–12)	Florida (26–14)	Coastal Carolina (32–12)	East Carolina (35–14)	Coastal Carolina (39–13)	Georgia (35–20)	Georgia (37–22)	Kansas State (43–18–1)	Kansas State (42–18–1)	Kansas State (43–18–1)	22.
23.	Kentucky	East Carolina (3–0)	Stanford (2–5)	San Diego (8–6)	East Carolina (11–4)	Florida (14–7)	San Diego (19–10)	Cal Poly (21–7)	Texas A&M (21–14)	Ohio State (29–8)	Kansas State (31–11–1)	Coastal Carolina (36–13)	Kansas State (38–13–1)	Louisville (40–14)	Elon (40–16)	South Carolina (40–23)	South Carolina (40–23)	South Carolina (40–23)	23.
24.	Florida	Ole Miss (1–2)	Fresno State (3–4)	Arkansas (9–2)	Fresno State (10–5)	Cal Poly (14–4)	Ohio State (20–4)	TCU (19–9)	San Diego State (25–12)	East Carolina (28–12)	Baylor (25–17)	Oregon State (27–12)	Cal Poly (33–15)	Elon (37–14)	Alabama (37–19)	Texas A&M (37–24)	Oregon State (37–19)	Oregon State (37–19)	24.
25.	UCLA	Michigan (4–0)	Ole Miss (3–3)	Michigan (10–2)	Florida (9–7)	TCU (13–6)	Cal Poly (17–7)	Florida (19–11)	Oregon State (20–7)	Oklahoma State (25–15)	Ohio State (31–10)	Ohio State (34–11)	Elon (36–14)	Cal Poly (35–17)	Cal Poly (37–19)	Oregon State (37–19)	Texas A&M (37–24)	Texas A&M (37–24)	25.
26.	Clemson	UCLA (2–1)	Arkansas (5–1)	Virginia (12–0)	Alabama (11–5)	UNC Wilmington (17–3)	Pepperdine (16–11)	San Diego State (22–11)	Ohio State (26–7)	Oregon State (23–9)	Oklahoma State (28–17)	Alabama (32–15)	Oregon State (29–14)	South Carolina (37–19)	Kansas State (41–16–1)	Georgia (38–24)	Georgia (38–24)	Georgia (38–24)	26.
27.	East Carolina	TCU (2–1)	Southern Miss (7–1)	Fresno State (5–4)	UNC Wilmington (14–2)	Alabama (15–7)	TCU (15–9)	Oregon State (18–6)	San Diego (23–13)	Alabama (27–13)	Alabama (29–15)	George Mason (38–9)	George Mason (38–9)	Ohio State (39–15)	Oregon State (35–17)	Elon (41–18)	Elon (41–18)	Elon (41–18)	27.
28.	Oklahoma	Louisville (0–3)	Michigan (7–2)	South Carolina (8–1)	Cal Poly (11–4)	Ohio State (17–2)	South Carolina (18–7)	Ohio State (22–7)	Oklahoma State (21–14)	San Diego (25–15)	George Mason (34–8)	Elon (33–13)	Louisville (36–14)	Kansas State (39–15–1)	South Carolina (38–21)	Vanderbilt (37–27)	Western Kentucky (42–20)	Western Kentucky (42–20)	28.
29.	Arizona	Arkansas (3–0)	Louisville (4–3)	Cal Poly (8–2)	San Diego (9–9)	San Diego (14–10)	San Diego State (18–9)	Alabama (20–10)	Kansas State (26–9)	Georgia Southern (28–9)	Oregon State (24–11)	Kansas (33–16)	Ohio State (36–14)	George Mason (40–10)	Georgia Southern (42–15)	Western Kentucky (42–20)	Vanderbilt (37–27)	Vanderbilt (37–27)	29.
30.	Michigan	Kentucky (2–2)	Cal Poly (6–1)	Louisville (8–4)	Ohio State (13–2)	College of Charleston (17–3)	UNC Wilmington (17–5)	George Mason (24–5)	Kansas (23–12)	Kansas State (29–11)	San Diego (27–17)	Baylor (26–20)	Texas State (37–12)	Oregon State (31–16)	Ohio State (40–17)	Alabama (37–210	Alabama (37–21)	Alabama (37–21)	30.
	Preseason Jan 12	Week 1 Feb 23	Week 2 Mar 2	Week 3 Mar 9	Week 4 Mar 16	Week 5 Mar 23	Week 6 Mar 30	Week 7 Apr 6	Week 8 Apr 13	Week 9 Apr 20	Week 10 Apr 27	Week 11 May 4	Week 12 May 11	Week 13 May 18	Week 14 May 25	Week 15 June 2	Week 16 June 9	Week 17 June 25	
		Dropped: 20 Missouri; 29 Arizona	Dropped: 26 UCLA; 30 Kentucky	Dropped: 23 Stanford; 27 Southern Miss	Dropped: 25 Michigan; 28 South Carolina; 30 Louisville	Dropped: 24 Fresno State	Dropped: 27 Alabama; 30 College of Charleston	Dropped: 26 Pepperdine; 28 South Carolina; 30 UNC Wilmington	Dropped: 29 Alabama; 30 George Mason	Dropped: 24 San Diego State; 30 Kansas	Dropped: 29 Georgia Southern	Dropped: 26 Oklahoma State; 30 San Diego	Dropped: 29 Kansas; 30 Baylor	Dropped: 30 Texas State	Dropped: 29 George Mason	Dropped: 25 Cal Poly; 29 Georgia Southern; 30 Ohio State	None	None	
