= 2009 Arizona Wildcats baseball team =

2009 Arizona Wildcats baseball
- Conference: Pacific-10 Conference
- Record: 30-25 (13–14 Pac-10)
- Head coach: Andy Lopez (8th season)
- Assistant coaches: Mark Wasikowski (8th season); Jeff Pickler (1st season); Keith Francis (3rd season)
- Home stadium: Sancet Stadium

The 2009 Arizona Wildcats baseball team represented the University of Arizona in the 2009 NCAA Division I baseball season. The Wildcats played their home games at Jerry Kindall Field at Frank Sancet Stadium. The team was coached by Andy Lopez in his 8th season at Arizona.

== Personnel ==
=== Roster ===
2009 Pacific-10 Conference baseball standings
	Conf.				Overall
Team	W		L	PCT	W		L	PCT
No. 3 Arizona State ‍†‍‍^{y}	21	–	6	.778	51	–	14	.785
Washington State ‍‍‍^{y}	19	–	8	.704	32	–	25	.561
No. 24 Oregon State ‍‍‍^{y}	15	–	12	.556	37	–	19	.661
UCLA ‍‍‍	15	–	12	.556	27	–	29	.482
Arizona ‍‍‍	13	–	14	.481	30	–	25	.545
Stanford ‍‍‍	13	–	14	.481	30	–	25	.545
Southern California ‍‍‍	13	–	14	.481	28	–	28	.500
Washington ‍‍‍	13	–	14	.481	25	–	30	.455
California ‍‍‍	9	–	18	.333	24	–	29	.453
Oregon ‍‍‍	4	–	23	.148	14	–	42	.250
† – Conference champion y – Invited to the NCAA tournament As of June 30, 2009; Rankings from Collegiate Basehall

2009 Arizona Wildcats roster
Pitchers • 11 – Preston Guilmet – Senior • 14 – Donn Roach – Freshman • 15 – Daniel Workman – RS Sophomore • 17 – Ryan Doyle – Sophomore • 18 – Kyle Simon – Freshman • 22 – Rick Patton – RS Freshman • 23 – Bryce Bandilla – Freshman • 26 – Jason Stoffel – Junior • 29 – Matt Veltmann – Sophomore • 34 – Cory Burns – Junior • 45 – Michael Lopez – Freshman • 46 – Matt Chaffee – Sophomore • 47 – Cody Lewis – Freshman • 49 – Joe Allison – RS Sophomore • 50 – Grayson Adams – Senior	Catchers • 4 – Michael Quesada – Freshman • 5 – Dwight Childs – Junior • 12 – Daniel Butler – RS Junior • 27 – Jett Bandy – Freshman Infielders • 2 – Kyle Stiner – Freshman • 3 – Kevin Luyben – RS Freshman • 6 – Steve Selsky – Freshman • 20 – Brad Glenn – Senior • 21 – Rafael Valenzuela – Junior • 24 – Shaun Cooper – Freshman • 28 – Mike Weldon – Junior • 37 – Bobby Brown – RS Freshman • 38 – Bryce Ortega – Sophomore • 39 – Dillon Baird – Junior • 43 – Marc Venning – Freshman	Outfielders • 10 – Bobby Coyle – Sophomore • 33 – Matt Presley – Sophomore • 35 – Hunter Pace – Senior • 40 – Diallo Fon – RS Junior • 42 – Codi Harshman – Junior

=== Coaches ===
2009 Arizona Wildcats baseball coaching staff
- Andy Lopez – Head coach
- Mark Wasikowski – Assistant coach
- Jeff Pickler – Assistant coach
- Keith Francis – Volunteer Assistant

=== Opening day ===
Opening Day Starters
Name	Position
Mike Weldon	Second baseman
Rafael Valenzuela	Left fielder
Brad Glenn	Third baseman
Bobby Coyle	Center fielder
Steve Selsky	Right fielder
Dillon Baird	First baseman
Matt Presley	Designated hitter
Dwight Childs	Catcher
Bryce Ortega	Shortstop
Preston Guilmet	Starting pitcher

== Schedule and results ==
2009 Arizona Wildcats baseball game log
Regular season
Date	Opponent	Rank	Site/Stadium	Score	Win	Loss	Save	Overall Record	Pac-10 Record
Feb 20	Sacramento State		Sancet Stadium • Tucson, AZ	W 5-3	Simon (1-0)	Ramirez (0-1)	Stoffel (1)	1-0	
Feb 21	Sacramento State		Sancet Stadium • Tucson, AZ	L 7-10	Darrah (1-0)	Veltmann (0-1)	None	1-1	
Feb 22	Sacramento State		Sancet Stadium • Tucson, AZ	W 11-2	Roach (1-0)	Baek (0-1)	None	2-1	
Feb 24	at UNLV		Earl Wilson Stadium • Paradise, NV	W 14-7	Chaffee (1-0)	DeWeese (0-1)	None	3-1	
Feb 25	at UNLV		Earl Wilson Stadium • Paradise, NV	W 16-12	Chaffee (2-0)	Hales (0-1)	Stoffel (2)	4-1	
Feb 27	#4 Georgia		Sancet Stadium • Tucson, AZ	L 5-11	Holder (2-0)	Guilmet (0-1)	None	4-2	
Feb 28	#4 Georgia		Sancet Stadium • Tucson, AZ	L 5-12	McRee (2-0)	Veltmann (0-2)	None	4-3	
Mar 1	#4 Georgia		Sancet Stadium • Tucson, AZ	L 5-10	Palazzone (1-0)	Roach (1-1)	None	4-4	
Mar 3	Holy Cross		Sancet Stadium • Tucson, AZ	W 15-4	Chaffee (3-0)	Shapiro (0-1)	None	5-4	
Mar 4	Holy Cross		Sancet Stadium • Tucson, AZ	W 8-1	Bandilla (1-0)	Croglio (0-1)	None	6-4	
Mar 6	UMass		Sancet Stadium • Tucson, AZ	W 13-4	Guilmet (1-1)	Freni (0-1)	None	7-4	
Mar 7	UMass		Sancet Stadium • Tucson, AZ	L 8-9	Clegg (1-0)	Roach (1-2)	Gedman (1)	7-5	
Mar 8	UMass		Sancet Stadium • Tucson, AZ	W 9-0	Veltmann (1-2)	Dicato (1-1)	Stoffel (3)	8-5	
Mar 10	#12 Oklahoma State		Sancet Stadium • Tucson, AZ	L 4-10	Keeling (1-0)	Simon (1-1)	None	8-6	
Mar 11	#12 Oklahoma State		Sancet Stadium • Tucson, AZ	L 5-8	Davis (1-0)	Bandilla (1-1)	Propst (1)	8-7	
Mar 13	Michigan		Sancet Stadium • Tucson, AZ	W 2-0	Guilmet (2-1)	Fetter (2-1)	Stoffel (4)	9-7	
Mar 14	Michigan		Sancet Stadium • Tucson, AZ	W 9-7	Simon (2-1)	Gerbe (0-1)	Stoffel (5)	10-7	
Mar 15	Michigan		Sancet Stadium • Tucson, AZ	W 14-0	Bandilla (2-1)	Smith (2-2)	None	11-7	
Mar 20	at #4 Arizona State		Packard Stadium • Tempe, AZ	L 1-4	Leake (5-1)	Guilmet (2-2)	None	11-8	0-1
Mar 21	at #4 Arizona State		Packard Stadium • Tempe, AZ	L 3-7	Spence (4-0)	Veltmann (1-3)	Lambson (1)	11-9	0-2
Mar 22	at #4 Arizona State		Packard Stadium • Tempe, AZ	L 9-23	Lambson (4-1)	Simon (2-2)	None	11-10	0-3
Mar 27	at UCLA		Jackie Robinson Stadium • Los Angeles, CA	L 6-7	Grace (2-1)	Guilmet (2-3)	None	11-11	0-4
Mar 28	at UCLA		Jackie Robinson Stadium • Los Angeles, CA	W 19-5	Veltmann (2-3)	Rasmussen (1-2)	Roach (1)	12-11	1-4
Mar 29	at UCLA		Jackie Robinson Stadium • Los Angeles, CA	L 6-8	Bauer (3-3)	Simon (2-3)	Brooks (2)	12-12	1-5
Apr 3	USC		Sancet Stadium • Tucson, AZ	W 7-6	Stoffel (1-0)	Stock (1-1)	None	13-12	2-5
Apr 4	USC		Sancet Stadium • Tucson, AZ	L 14-15	Smith (3-2)	Veltmann (2-4)	Cooper (2)	13-13	2-6
Apr 5	USC		Sancet Stadium • Tucson, AZ	L 3-7	Stock (2-1)	Roach (1-3)	None	13-14	2-7
Apr 9	#16 Oregon State		Sancet Stadium • Tucson, AZ	L 5-9	Nygren (2-0)	Stoffel (1-1)	None	13-15	2-8
Apr 10	#16 Oregon State		Sancet Stadium • Tucson, AZ	W 6-5	Allison (1-0)	Peavey (3-2)	Stoffel (6)	14-15	3-8
Apr 11	#16 Oregon State		Sancet Stadium • Tucson, AZ	L 3-8	Reyes (5-1)	Roach (1-4)	None	14-16	3-9
Apr 14	New Mexico		Sancet Stadium • Tucson, AZ	W 9-3	Allison (2-0)	Moore (4-2)	Stoffel (7)	15-16	
Apr 15	New Mexico		Sancet Stadium • Tucson, AZ	W 13-5	Workman (1-0)	Kesler (0-1)	None	16-16	
Apr 17	at Washington State		Bailey-Brayton Field • Pullman, WA	L 4-5	Way (5-3)	Guilmet (2-4)	Johnson (4)	16-17	3-10
Apr 18	at Washington State		Bailey-Brayton Field • Pullman, WA	L 4-5	Arnold (4-2)	Workman (1-1)	Johnson (5)	16-18	3-11
Apr 19	at Washington State		Bailey-Brayton Field • Pullman, WA	L 7-8	Johnson (4-1)	Veltmann (2-5)	None	16-19	3-12
Apr 20	at Gonzaga		Washington Trust Field • Spokane, WA	W 8-7	Allison (3-0)	Berg (2-3)	Burns (1)	17-19	
Apr 24	at Stanford		Sunken Diamond • Palo Alto, CA	W 11-1	Guilmet (3-4)	Pries (3-1)	None	18-19	4-12
Apr 25	at Stanford		Sunken Diamond • Palo Alto, CA	L 1-3	Mooneyham (4-2)	Simon (2-4)	Storen (6)	18-20	4-13
Apr 26	at Stanford		Sunken Diamond • Palo Alto, CA	W 7-6	Burns (1-0)	Inman (1-6)	Stoffel (8)	19-20	5-13
Apr 29	#3 Arizona State		Sancet Stadium • Tucson, AZ	L 3-20	Swagerty (2-1)	Bandilla (2-2)	None	19-21	
May 1	California		Sancet Stadium • Tucson, AZ	W 13-4	Guilmet (4-4)	Flemer (3-3)	None	20-21	6-13
May 2	California		Sancet Stadium • Tucson, AZ	W 8-4	Burns (2-0)	Johnson (3-5)	None	21-21	7-13
May 3	California		Sancet Stadium • Tucson, AZ	W 12-8	Workman (2-1)	Bugary (3-4)	None	22-21	8-13
May 5	at #6 Cal State Fullerton		Goodwin Field • Fullerton, CA	L 2-5	Rath (3-1)	Allison (3-1)	Ramirez (3)	22-22	
May 6	at #6 Cal State Fullerton		Goodwin Field • Fullerton, CA	L 4-8	Floro (1-0)	Simon (2-5)	None	22-23	
May 9	Loyola Marymount		Sancet Stadium • Tucson, AZ	W 12-2	Guilmet (5-4)	Roberts (7-1)	None	23-23	
May 10	Loyola Marymount		Sancet Stadium • Tucson, AZ	W 9-5	Simon (3-5)	Gillingham (4-3)	None	24-23	
May 11	Loyola Marymount		Sancet Stadium • Tucson, AZ	W 7-6	Stoffel (2-1)	Lally (1-3)	None	25-23	
May 16	Washington		Sancet Stadium • Tucson, AZ	L 4-7	Erickson (5-4)	Guilmet (5-5)	None	25-24	8-14
May 17	Washington		Sancet Stadium • Tucson, AZ	W 10-7	Bandilla (3-2)	Pearl (1-4)	Stoffel (9)	26-24	9-14
May 18	Washington		Sancet Stadium • Tucson, AZ	W 9-5	Allison (4-1)	Kittredge (4-4)	None	27-24	10-14
May 20	Arizona State		Sancet Stadium • Tucson, AZ	L 3-9	Franzblau (3-2)	Bandilla (3-3)	None	27-25	
May 22	at Oregon		PK Park • Eugene, OR	W 3-1	Guilmet (6-5)	Stavert (5-6)	Stoffel (10)	28-25	11-14
May 23	at Oregon		PK Park • Eugene, OR	W 14-5	Allison (5-1)	Anderson (2-9)	None	29-25	12-14
May 24	at Oregon		PK Park • Eugene, OR	W 5-2	Workman (3-1)	Keudell (0-6)	Stoffel (11)	30-25	13-14

== 2009 MLB draft ==
Player	Position	Round	Overall	MLB team
Jason Stoffel	RHP	4	117	San Francisco Giants
Cory Burns	RHP	8	245	Cleveland Indians
Preston Guilmet	RHP	9	275	Cleveland Indians
Dillon Baird	3B	11	351	Los Angeles Angels of Anaheim
Dwight Childs	C	18	545	Cleveland Indians
Brad Glenn	OF	23	700	Toronto Blue Jays
