= 2009 Arizona State Sun Devils baseball team =

American college baseball season

2009 Arizona State Sun Devils baseball

Pac-12 champions NCAA Tempe Regional champions NCAA Tempe Super Regional champions

College World Series, 2–2
- Conference: Pacific-10 Conference
- Record: 51–14 (21–6 Pac-10)
- Head coach: Pat Murphy (15th year)
- Home stadium: Packard Stadium

2009 Pacific-10 Conference baseball standings
	Conf.				Overall
Team	W		L	PCT	W		L	PCT
No. 3 Arizona State ‍†‍‍^{y}	21	–	6	.778	51	–	14	.785
Washington State ‍‍‍^{y}	19	–	8	.704	32	–	25	.561
No. 24 Oregon State ‍‍‍^{y}	15	–	12	.556	37	–	19	.661
UCLA ‍‍‍	15	–	12	.556	27	–	29	.482
Arizona ‍‍‍	13	–	14	.481	30	–	25	.545
Stanford ‍‍‍	13	–	14	.481	30	–	25	.545
Southern California ‍‍‍	13	–	14	.481	28	–	28	.500
Washington ‍‍‍	13	–	14	.481	25	–	30	.455
California ‍‍‍	9	–	18	.333	24	–	29	.453
Oregon ‍‍‍	4	–	23	.148	14	–	42	.250
† – Conference champion y – Invited to the NCAA tournament As of June 30, 2009; Rankings from Collegiate Basehall

The 2009 Arizona State Sun Devils baseball team represented Arizona State University in the 2009 NCAA Division I baseball season. The Sun Devils played their home games at Packard Stadium, and played as part of the Pacific-10 Conference. The team was coached by Pat Murphy in his fifteenth season as head coach at Arizona State.

The Sun Devils reached the College World Series, their twenty-first appearance in Omaha, where they finished tied for third place after recording a pair of wins against North Carolina and losing two to eventual runner-up Texas.

== Personnel ==
=== Roster ===
2009 Arizona State Sun Devils roster
Pitchers: 3 – Jordan Swagerty – Freshman; 8 – Mike Leake – Junior; 35 – RJ Preach – Sophomore; 36 – Jeeter Ishida – Freshman; 40 – Mitchell Lambson – Freshman; 43 – Seth Blair – Sophomore; 45 – Josh Spence – Junior; 48 – Tony Annino – Senior; 51 – Jake Borup – (redshirt) Freshman; 56 – Jason Franzblau – Senior; 58 – Kyle Brule – Sophomore	Catchers: 13 – Austin Barnes – Freshman; 55 – Carlos Ramirez – Junior; 76 – Andrew Pollak – (redshirt) Freshman; Outfielders: 11 – Matt Newman – Sophomore; 15 – Brandon Magee – Freshman; 18 – Jeff Lusardi – Freshman; 23 – Johnny Ruettiger – Freshman; 28 – Jason Kipnis – Junior; 46 – Andy Workman – Sophomore; 49 – Kole Calhoun – Junior	Infielders: 2 – Zack MacPhee – Freshman; 4 – Mike Murphy – Senior; 20 – Abe Ruiz – Freshman; 22 – Jared McDonald – Junior; 25 – Zach Wilson – Freshman; 29 – Raoul Torrez – Junior; 30 – Riccio Torrez – Freshman; 37 – Drew Maggi – Freshman

=== Coaches ===
2009 Arizona State Sun Devils baseball coaching staff
- 42 – Pat Murphy – Head coach – 15th year
- 10 – Tim Esmay – Assistant coach – 9th year
- 17 – Andy Stankiewicz – Assistant coach – 3rd year
- 32 – Josh Holliday – Volunteer assistant coach – 2nd year

== Schedule and results ==
Legend
Arizona State win
Arizona State loss

2009 Arizona State Sun Devils baseball game log
Regular season

February
Date	Opponent	Rank	Site/stadium	Score	Overall record	Pac-10 record
Feb 20	Milwaukee*	No. 6	Packard Stadium • Tempe, AZ	W 15–3	1–0	
Feb 21	Milwaukee*	No. 6	Packard Stadium • Tempe, AZ	W 13–5	2–0	
Feb 21	Milwaukee*	No. 6	Packard Stadium • Tempe, AZ	W 14–1	3–0	
Feb 22	Milwaukee*	No. 6	Packard Stadium • Tempe, AZ	W 11–0	4–0	
Feb 24	Missouri*	No. 4	Packard Stadium • Tempe, AZ	W 3–1	5–0	
Feb 26	Missouri*	No. 4	Packard Stadium • Tempe, AZ (DeMarini Invitational)	W 2–1	6–0	
Feb 27	Northern Illinois*	No. 4	Packard Stadium • Tempe, AZ (DeMarini Invitational)	W 6–1	7–0	
Feb 28	Oregon State	No. 4	Packard Stadium • Tempe, AZ (DeMarini Invitational)	W 6–3	8–0	

March
Date	Opponent	Rank	Site/stadium	Score	Overall record	Pac-10 record
Mar 1	Missouri*	No. 4	Packard Stadium • Tempe, AZ (DeMarini Invitational)	L 2–5^{8}	8–1	
Mar 5	Holy Cross*	No. 5	Packard Stadium • Tempe, AZ	W 15–0	9–1	
Mar 6	Holy Cross*	No. 5	Packard Stadium • Tempe, AZ	W 12–1	10–1	
Mar 7	Holy Cross*	No. 5	Packard Stadium • Tempe, AZ	W 11–3	11–1	
Mar 10	Kansas State*	No. 5	Surprise Stadium • Surprise, AZ (Coca Cola Classic)	L 2–6	11–2	
Mar 11	Kansas State*	No. 5	Surprise Stadium • Surprise, AZ (Coca Cola Classic)	W 12–1	12–2	
Mar 13	Kansas*	No. 5	Surprise Stadium • Surprise, AZ (Coca Cola Classic)	W 9–4	13–2	
Mar 14	Kansas*	No. 5	Surprise Stadium • Surprise, AZ (Coca Cola Classic)	L 2–3	13–3	
Mar 15	Kansas*	No. 5	Surprise Stadium • Surprise, AZ (Coca Cola Classic)	W 12–10	14–3	
Mar 20	Arizona	No. 8	Packard Stadium • Tempe, AZ	W 4–1	15–3	1–0
Mar 21	Arizona	No. 8	Packard Stadium • Tempe, AZ	W 7–3	16–3	2–0
Mar 22	Arizona	No. 8	Packard Stadium • Tempe, AZ	W 23–9	17–3	3–0
Mar 27	Southern California	No. 7	Packard Stadium • Tempe, AZ	W 2–1	18–3	4–0
Mar 28	Southern California	No. 7	Packard Stadium • Tempe, AZ	W 10–1	19–3	5–0
Mar 29	Southern California	No. 7	Packard Stadium • Tempe, AZ	L 2–8	19–4	5–1
Mar 31	No. 2 Cal State Fullerton*	No. 7	Packard Stadium • Tempe, AZ	L 5–7	19–5	

April
Date	Opponent	Rank	Site/stadium	Score	Overall record	Pac-10 record
Apr 1	No. 2 Cal State Fullerton*	No. 7	Packard Stadium • Tempe, AZ	W 3–1	20–5	
Apr 3	at Washington	No. 7	Safeco Field • Seattle, WA	W 3–1	21–5	6–1
Apr 4	at Washington	No. 7	Husky Ballpark • Seattle, WA	W 12–1	22–5	7–1
Apr 5	at Washington	No. 7	Husky Ballpark • Seattle, WA	W 6–2	23–5	8–1
Apr 7	at No. 1 Arkansas*	No. 2	Baum Stadium • Fayetteville, AR	L 3–7	23–6	
Apr 8	at No. 1 Arkansas*	No. 2	Baum Stadium • Fayetteville, AR	L 7–8	23–7	
Apr 10	Washington State	No. 2	Packard Stadium • Tempe, AZ	W 13–3	24–7	9–1
Apr 11	Washington State	No. 2	Packard Stadium • Tempe, AZ	W 11–1	25–7	10–1
Apr 12	Washington State	No. 2	Packard Stadium • Tempe, AZ	L 4–10	25–8	10–2
Apr 17	Stanford	No. 6	Packard Stadium • Tempe, AZ	W 14–6	26–8	11–2
Apr 18	Stanford	No. 6	Packard Stadium • Tempe, AZ	W 7–2	27–8	12–2
Apr 19	Stanford	No. 6	Packard Stadium • Tempe, AZ	W 6–3	28–8	13–2
Apr 21	Hawaii*	No. 2	Packard Stadium • Tempe, AZ	W 17–2	29–8	
Apr 24	at California	No. 2	Evans Diamond • Berkeley, CA	W 3–1	30–8	14–2
Apr 25	at California	No. 2	Evans Diamond • Berkeley, CA	L 6–10	30–9	14–3
Apr 26	at California	No. 2	Evans Diamond • Berkeley, CA	W 6–5	31–9	15–3
Apr 29	at Arizona*	No. 2	Jerry Kindall Field at Frank Sancet Stadium • Tucson, AZ	W 20–3	32–9	

May
Date	Opponent	Rank	Site/stadium	Score	Overall record	Pac-10 record
May 1	at No. 22 Oregon State	No. 4	Goss Stadium • Corvallis, OR	W 4–2	33–9	16–3
May 2	at No. 22 Oregon State	No. 4	Goss Stadium • Corvallis, OR	L 3–4	33–10	16–4
May 3	at No. 22 Oregon State	No. 4	Goss Stadium • Corvallis, OR	L 5–10	33–11	16–5
May 5	San Diego*	No. 4	Packard Stadium • Tempe, AZ	W 8–7^{11}	34–11	
May 6	San Diego*	No. 4	Packard Stadium • Tempe, AZ	W 7–6	35–11	
May 8	Winthrop*	No. 4	Packard Stadium • Tempe, AZ	W 14–3	36–11	
May 9	Winthrop*	No. 4	Packard Stadium • Tempe, AZ	W 10–9	37–11	
May 10	Winthrop*	No. 4	Packard Stadium • Tempe, AZ	W 5–0	38–11	
May 15	Oregon	No. 3	Packard Stadium • Tempe, AZ	W 9–0	39–11	17–5
May 16	Oregon	No. 3	Packard Stadium • Tempe, AZ	W 10–2	40–11	18–5
May 17	Oregon	No. 3	Packard Stadium • Tempe, AZ	W 8–0	41–11	19–5
May 20	at Arizona	No. 3	Jerry Kindall Field at Frank Sancet Stadium • Tucson, AZ	W 9–3	42–11	
May 22	UCLA	No. 3	Packard Stadium • Tempe, AZ	W 4–0	43–11	20–5
May 23	UCLA	No. 3	Packard Stadium • Tempe, AZ	L 4–10	43–12	20–6
May 24	UCLA	No. 3	Packard Stadium • Tempe, AZ	W 6–5	44–12	21–6

Postseason

NCAA Tempe Regional
Date	Opponent	Seed	Site/stadium	Score	Overall record	Reg Record
May 29	(4) Kent State	No. 3 (1)	Packard Stadium • Tempe, AZ	W 17–6	45–12	1–0
May 30	(2) Oral Roberts	No. 3 (1)	Packard Stadium • Tempe, AZ	W 4–1	46–12	2–0
May 31	(2) Oral Roberts	No. 3 (1)	Packard Stadium • Tempe, AZ	W 8–3	47–12	3–0

NCAA Tempe Super Regional
Date	Opponent	Seed	Site/stadium	Score	Overall record	SR Record
June 6	No. 13 Clemson	No. 2 (5)	Packard Stadium • Tempe, AZ	W 7–4	48–12	1–0
June 7	No. 13 Clemson	No. 2 (5)	Packard Stadium • Tempe, AZ	W 8–2	49–12	2–0

College World Series
Date	Opponent	Seed	Site/stadium	Score	Overall record	CWS record
June 14	No. 4 (4) North Carolina	No. 2 (5)	Johnny Rosenblatt Stadium • Omaha, NE	W 5–2	50–12	1–0
June 16	No. 5 (1) Texas	No. 2 (5)	Johnny Rosenblatt Stadium • Omaha, NE	L 6–10	50–13	1–1
June 18	No. 4 (4) North Carolina	No. 2 (5)	Johnny Rosenblatt Stadium • Omaha, NE	W 12–5	51–13	2–1
June 19	No. 5 (1) Texas	No. 2 (5)	Johnny Rosenblatt Stadium • Omaha, NE	L 3–4	51–14	2–2
