= 2009 UCLA Bruins baseball team =

American college baseball season

2009 UCLA Bruins baseball
- Conference: Pacific-10 Conference
- Record: 27–29 (15–12 Pac-10)
- Head coach: John Savage (5th season)
- Assistant coaches: Rick Vanderhook (1st season); P.C. Shaw (3rd season); Steve Pearse (1st season)
- Home stadium: Jackie Robinson Stadium

2009 Pacific-10 Conference baseball standings
	Conf.				Overall
Team	W		L	PCT	W		L	PCT
No. 3 Arizona State ‍†‍‍^{y}	21	–	6	.778	51	–	14	.785
Washington State ‍‍‍^{y}	19	–	8	.704	32	–	25	.561
No. 24 Oregon State ‍‍‍^{y}	15	–	12	.556	37	–	19	.661
UCLA ‍‍‍	15	–	12	.556	27	–	29	.482
Arizona ‍‍‍	13	–	14	.481	30	–	25	.545
Stanford ‍‍‍	13	–	14	.481	30	–	25	.545
Southern California ‍‍‍	13	–	14	.481	28	–	28	.500
Washington ‍‍‍	13	–	14	.481	25	–	30	.455
California ‍‍‍	9	–	18	.333	24	–	29	.453
Oregon ‍‍‍	4	–	23	.148	14	–	42	.250
† – Conference champion y – Invited to the NCAA tournament As of June 30, 2009; Rankings from Collegiate Basehall

The 2009 UCLA Bruins baseball team represented the University of California, Los Angeles in the 2009 NCAA Division I baseball season. The Bruins played their home games in Jackie Robinson Stadium, and finished the season with a 27–29 overall record. With a 15–12 record in conference play, UCLA tied Oregon State as the #3 team in the Pacific-10 Conference, behind #1 Arizona State and #2 Washington State. Even though UCLA won the three-game season series 2–1, Oregon State was invited to the 2009 NCAA Division I baseball tournament instead of UCLA due to their better overall record (37–19).

== Previous season ==
The Bruins completed the 2008 season with a 33–27 overall record, and finished third in the Pac-10 Conference behind #1 Arizona State and #2 Stanford. The 2008 season ended at the Fullerton Regionals when the Bruins lost two games in a row to Cal State Fullerton.

== Roster ==
2009 UCLA Bruins baseball team
Players
Coaches

#	Pos.	Name	B/T	Height	Weight	Year	Previous school	Home town
18	C	Gino Aielli	R/R	5 ft 10 in (1.78 m)	195 lb (88 kg)	Sr	Saddleback JC	Laguna Niguel, CA
4	INF	Chris Amezquita	R/R	6 ft 2 in (1.88 m)	195 lb (88 kg)	Fr	Servite HS	La Mirada, CA
11	RHP	Trevor Bauer	R/R	6 ft 1 in (1.85 m)	175 lb (79 kg)	Fr	Hart HS	Valencia, CA
35	LHP	Mitchell Beacom	L/L	6 ft 8 in (2.03 m)	240 lb (109 kg)	RS Fr	University City HS	San Diego, CA
25	RHP	Charles Brewer	R/R	6 ft 4 in (1.93 m)	205 lb (93 kg)	Jr	Chaparral HS	Paradise Valley, AZ
32	RHP	Chase Brewer (redshirt)	R/R	6 ft 4 in (1.93 m)	190 lb (86 kg)	Fr	Chaparral HS	Paradise Valley, AZ
7	LHP	Gavin Brooks	L/L	6 ft 4 in (1.93 m)	220 lb (100 kg)	Jr	Rancho Buena Vista HS	Vista, CA
38	RHP	Garett Claypool	R/R	6 ft 2 in (1.88 m)	180 lb (82 kg)	Jr	El Camino HS	West Hills, CA
44	OF	Gabe Cohen	R/R	6 ft 2 in (1.88 m)	210 lb (95 kg)	Jr	El Camino HS	Woodland Hills, CA
12	RHP	Gerrit Cole	R/R	6 ft 4 in (1.93 m)	215 lb (98 kg)	Fr	Orange Lutheran HS	Santa Ana, CA
6	C	Cody Decker	R/R	6 ft 0 in (1.83 m)	225 lb (102 kg)	Sr	Santa Monica HS	Santa Monica, CA
8	LHP	Matt Drummond (redshirt)	L/L	6 ft 1 in (1.85 m)	190 lb (86 kg)	Jr	Paso Robles HS	Paso Robles, CA
9	OF	Blair Dunlap	R/R	6 ft 0 in (1.83 m)	190 lb (86 kg)	RS Jr	Santa Margarita HS	Mission Viejo, CA
20	OF	Raul Duran	R/R	6 ft 3 in (1.91 m)	210 lb (95 kg)	RS So	Saddleback HS	Santa Ana, CA
2	INF	Niko Gallego	R/R	5 ft 11 in (1.8 m)	165 lb (75 kg)	So	Esperanza HS	Yorba Linda, CA
49	C	Chris Giovinazzo	R/R	6 ft 0 in (1.83 m)	205 lb (93 kg)	So	Laguna Hills HS	Laguna Hills, CA
33	RHP	Erik Goeddel	R/R	6 ft 3 in (1.91 m)	180 lb (82 kg)	RS Fr	Bellarmine HS	Hillsborough, CA
31	LHP	Matt Grace	L/L	6 ft 4 in (1.93 m)	205 lb (93 kg)	So	Palos Verdes HS	Palos Verdes Estates, CA
14	INF	Casey Haerther	R/R	6 ft 2 in (1.88 m)	210 lb (95 kg)	Jr	Chaminade HS	Chatsworth, CA
26	RHP	Jordan Haver	R/R	6 ft 5 in (1.96 m)	205 lb (93 kg)	Jr	Wilson HS	Long Beach, CA
23	RHP	Dan Klein (redshirt)	R/R	6 ft 3 in (1.91 m)	190 lb (86 kg)	So	Servite HS	Los Alamitos, CA
24	OF	Brett Krill	R/R	6 ft 4 in (1.93 m)	220 lb (100 kg)	So	Aliso Niguel HS	Laguna Niguel, CA
34	LHP	Brendan Lafferty	R/L	6 ft 5 in (1.96 m)	215 lb (98 kg)	RS Sr	Riverside Poly HS	Riverside, CA
44	INF	Matt Mosher (redshirt)	L/R	6 ft 5 in (1.96 m)	235 lb (107 kg)	Fr	Menlo-Atherton HS	Menlo Park, CA
19	INF	Eddie Murray	R/R	5 ft 9 in (1.75 m)	160 lb (73 kg)	Sr	Gahr HS	Artesia, CA
30	OF	Marc Navarro	L/R	5 ft 11 in (1.8 m)	180 lb (82 kg)	RS Fr	Santa Margarita HS	Laguna Hills, CA
40	RHP	Jason Novak	R/R	6 ft 2 in (1.88 m)	205 lb (93 kg)	Sr	Agoura HS	Agoura Hills, CA
36	OF	Dustin Quist	R/R	6 ft 2 in (1.88 m)	210 lb (95 kg)	RS Jr	Central HS	Fresno, CA
5	INF	Tyler Rahmatulla	R/R	5 ft 11 in (1.8 m)	180 lb (82 kg)	Fr	Mater Dei HS	Mission Viejo, CA
27	LHP	Rob Rasmussen	L/L	5 ft 11 in (1.8 m)	160 lb (73 kg)	So	Pasadena Poly HS	Arcadia, CA
3	C	Steve Rodriguez	L/R	6 ft 1 in (1.85 m)	185 lb (84 kg)	Fr	St. John Bosco HS	Lomita, CA
21	RHP	Tim Schlatter (injured)	R/R	6 ft 1 in (1.85 m)	190 lb (86 kg)	RS Jr	Sacramento CC	Lafayette, CA
15	OF	Justin Uribe	L/L	5 ft 11 in (1.8 m)	190 lb (86 kg)	Jr	Foothill HS	Santa Ana, CA
16	INF	Alex Weber-Shapiro	L/L	6 ft 3 in (1.91 m)	200 lb (91 kg)	Jr	Claremont McKenna	Berkeley, CA
1	INF	Adrian Williams	R/R	6 ft 0 in (1.83 m)	170 lb (77 kg)	Fr	Canyon Springs HS	Moreno Valley, CA

Head coach

John Savage

Assistant coach(es)

Rick Vanderhook
Steve Pearse
P.C. Shaw

Legend

- (C) Team captain
- (S) Suspended
- (I) Ineligible
- Injured
- Current redshirt

Roster
Last update: December 11, 2010

== Schedule ==
2009 UCLA Bruins baseball game log
Regular season
February

#	Date	Opponent	Site/stadium	Score	Win	Loss	Save	Attendance	Overall record	Pac-10 record
1	February 20	UC Davis	Jackie Robinson Stadium	13–1	R. Rasmussen (1–0)	J. McChesney (0–1)	None	784	1–0	–
2	February 21	UC Davis	Jackie Robinson Stadium	5–2	G. Cole (1–0)	A. Suiter (0–1)	T. Bauer (1)	848	2–0	–
3	February 22	UC Davis	Jackie Robinson Stadium	8–7 ^{11}	T. Bauer (0–1)	D. Quist (1–0)	None	682	2–1	–
4	February 24	UC Santa Barbara	Caesar Uyesaka Stadium	7–6	M. Grace (0–1)	M. Ford (1–0)	D. Meals (1)	350	2–2	–
5	February 25	UC Riverside	Jackie Robinson Stadium	11–1	G. Brooks (0–1)	R. Platt (1–0)	None	407	2–3	–
6	February 27	Rice	Minute Maid Park	5–4	T. Bauer (0–2)	Jo. Rogers (2–0)	None	6,879	2–4	–
7	February 28	Baylor	Minute Maid Park	5–1	G. Cole (1–1)	K. Volz (1–0)	W. Kempf (1)	13,928	2–5	–

== Rankings ==
Ranking movement Legend: ██ Increase in ranking. ██ Decrease in ranking. ██ Not ranked the previous week. NR = Not ranked. RV = Receiving votes.
Poll	Pre- season	Feb. 23	Mar. 2	Mar. 9	Mar. 16	Mar. 23	Mar. 30	Apr. 6	Apr. 13	Apr. 20	Apr. 27	May 4	May 11	May 18	May 25	June 2	June 8	Final Poll
Coaches' Poll																		
Baseball America	12	9	NR	NR	NR	NR	NR	NR	NR	NR	NR	NR	NR	NR	NR	NR	NR	NR
Collegiate Baseball^	21	21	NR															
NCBWA†																		
Rivals.com																		
^ Collegiate Baseball ranked 40 teams in their preseason poll, but will only rank 30 teams weekly during the season. † NCBWA ranked 35 teams in their preseason poll, but will only rank 30 teams weekly during the season.

== UCLA Bruins in the 2009 MLB draft ==
The following members of the UCLA Bruins baseball program were drafted in the 2009 Major League Baseball draft.

Player	Position	Round	Overall	MLB team
Casey Haerther	1B	5th	171st	Los Angeles Angels of Anaheim
Gavin Brooks	LHP	9th	285th	New York Yankees
Charles Brewer	RHP	12th	366th	Arizona Diamondbacks
Brendan Lafferty	LHP	18th	542nd	Kansas City Royals
Cody Decker	1B	22nd	654th	San Diego Padres
Gabriel Cohen	LF	29th	889th	Tampa Bay Rays
Garrett Claypool	RHP	32nd	963rd	Oakland Athletics
Jason Novak	RHP	48th	1449th	St. Louis Cardinals
