= Brad Glenn =

American baseball player (born 1987)

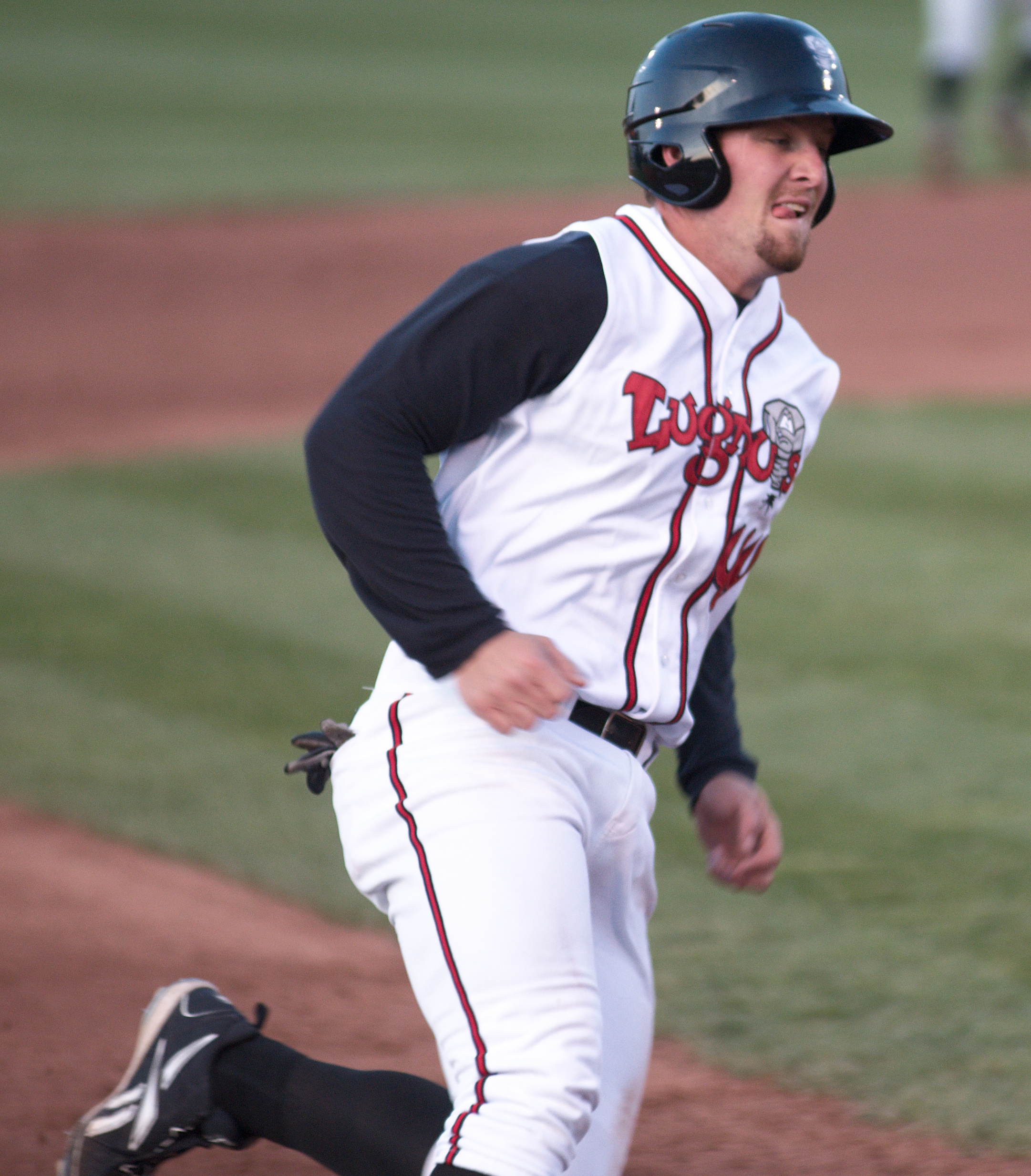
- Glenn with the Lansing Lugnuts in 2010
- Outfielder
- Born: April 2, 1987 (age 38); Tulsa, Oklahoma
- Batted: Right Threw: Right

MLB debut
- June 27, 2014, for the Toronto Blue Jays

Last MLB appearance
- July 5, 2014, for the Toronto Blue Jays

MLB statistics
- Batting average: .067
- Home runs: 0
- Runs batted in: 0
- Stats at Baseball Reference

Teams
- Toronto Blue Jays (2014)

Bradley Edward Glenn (born April 2, 1987) is an American former professional baseball outfielder. He played in six games for the Toronto Blue Jays of Major League Baseball (MLB) in 2014.

== Career ==
Glenn played college baseball for the University of Arizona and in 2007 he played collegiate summer baseball with the Brewster Whitecaps of the Cape Cod Baseball League. He was drafted in the 17th round of the 2008 Major League Baseball draft by the Oakland Athletics, but did not sign. He was later drafted in the 23rd round of the 2009 Major League Baseball draft by the Toronto Blue Jays, and signed with the team. Glenn was assigned to the Low-A Auburn Doubledays for the 2009 season, where he batted .221 over 64 games. In 2010, he played with the Class-A Lansing Lugnuts and improved, batting .271 with 17 homeruns in 109 games. Glenn was promoted to the High-A Dunedin Blue Jays for the 2011 season, and hit a career-high 26 home runs in 111 games played. He would again move up in the organization, playing the 2012 season with the Double-A New Hampshire Fisher Cats. Glenn struggled in his first season in New Hampshire, batting .239 in 112 games. He split the 2013 season between New Hampshire and the Triple-A Buffalo Bisons, and batted a combined .261 with 22 home runs. He began the 2014 season with New Hampshire again, and was promoted to Buffalo on May 16, 2014.

Glenn was called up for the first time in his career on June 25, 2014. Infielder Jonathan Diaz was designated for assignment to make room on the 40-man roster for Glenn. Prior to his promotion to the Majors, Glenn was batting .381 with the Bisons, with 4 home runs and 22 RBI. He made his MLB debut on June 27, and went hitless in 3 at-bats. On July 5, he recorded his first career hit and walk. Glenn was designated for assignment on July 6 to make room for Nolan Reimold. He cleared waivers and was outrighted to Buffalo on July 8. Glenn elected free agency on November 6, 2015.
