= 2009 NCAA Division I baseball season =

Baseball season

- Duration: February 20–June 24, 2009
- Number of teams: 302
- Preseason No. 1: LSU

Tournament
- Duration: May 29–June 24, 2009
- Most conference bids: ACC (7)

College World Series
- Duration: June 13–June 24, 2009
- Champions: LSU (6th title)
- Runners-up: Texas (33rd CWS Appearance)
- Winning coach: Paul Mainieri (1st title)
- MOP: Jared Mitchell (LSU)

Seasons
- ← 2008 2010 →

The 2009 NCAA Division I baseball season play of college baseball in the United States, organized by the National Collegiate Athletic Association (NCAA) at the Division I level, began on February 20, 2009. The season progressed through the regular season, many conference tournaments and championship series, and concluded with the 2009 NCAA Division I baseball tournament and 2009 College World Series. The College World Series, which consisted of the eight remaining teams in the NCAA tournament, was held in its annual location of Omaha, Nebraska, at Rosenblatt Stadium. It concluded on June 24, 2009, with the final game of the best of three championship series. LSU defeated Texas two games to one to claim their sixth championship.

== Realignment ==
=== New programs ===
Five new programs joined Division I for the 2009 season. Three programs, Bryant, North Dakota, and SIU Edwardsville, joined from Division II. The two other Division I members, Oregon and Cal State Bakersfield, were new varsity baseball programs.

=== Dropped programs ===
Hawaii-Hilo, which had competed as a Division I independent, dropped to Division II.

=== Conference changes ===
The Big South Conference added two new members. Gardner–Webb, previously of the Atlantic Sun Conference, and Presbyterian, previously a Division I independent, both joined the conference.

Two conferences add a single member. Oregon's new program joined the Pacific-10 Conference. Samford left the Ohio Valley Conference to join the Southern Conference.

Four schools became Division I independents− Bryant, from the Division II Northeast-10 Conference; North Dakota, from the Division II North Central Conference; SIU Edwardsville, from the Division II Great Lakes Valley Conference; and Cal State Bakersfield, in its first season of varsity intercollegiate baseball.

== Preseason rankings ==
After a 49–19 season in 2008, the LSU Tigers were ranked #1 prior to the season. Defending World Series champion Fresno State was ranked #19.

== Conference standings ==
America East Conference
	Conf				Overall			
Team	W	L	T	Pct	W	L	T	Pct
Albany	15	9		.625	26	31	1	.457
Binghamton	13	7		.650	30	22		.577
Stony Brook	14	10		.583	29	23		.558
Vermont	14	10		.583	22	33		.400
Maine	13	11		.542	30	21		.588
Hartford	7	15		.318	15	32		.319
UMBC	4	18		.182	9	36		.200

Atlantic 10 Conference
	Conf				Overall			
Team	W	L	T	Pct	W	L	T	Pct
Dayton	21	6		.778	34	19		.642
Rhode Island	19	6		.760	37	20	1	.647
Xavier	18	9		.667	39	21		.650
Charlotte	16	11		.593	31	22		.585
Massachusetts	16	11		.593	27	26		.509
Fordham	16	11		.593	22	31		.415
Saint Louis	12	13		.480	30	25		.545
George Washington	11	15		.423	11	33		.389
Richmond	11	16		.407	22	25		.468
Temple	11	16		.407	17	33		.340
St. Bonaventure	9	17		.346	24	25		.490
Saint Joseph's	9	17		.346	16	30	1	.351
La Salle	9	18		.333	19	30		.388
Duquesne	7	19		.269	14	41		.255

Atlantic Coast Conference
	Conf				Overall			
Team	W	L	T	Pct	W	L	T	Pct
Atlantic
Florida State	19	9		.679	45	18		.714
Clemson	19	11		.633	44	22		.667
Boston College	13	15		.464	34	26		.567
Maryland	10	20		.333	27	27		.500
North Carolina State	10	20		.3333	25	31		.446
Wake Forest	6	24		.200	22	30		.423
Coastal
North Carolina	19	10		.655	48	18		.727
Georgia Tech	17	10	1	.625	38	19	1	.664
Miami (FL)	18	12		.600	36	22		.621
Virginia	16	11	1	.589	49	15	1	.762
Duke	15	15		.500	35	24		.593
Virginia Tech	12	17		.414	32	21		.604

Atlantic Sun Conference
	Conf				Overall			
Team	W	L	T	Pct	W	L	T	Pct
Florida Gulf Coast	23	7		.767	36	18		.667
Kennesaw State	20	9		.690	30	22		.577
Jacksonville	19	11		.633	37	22		.627
Lipscomb	17	13		.567	24	32		.429
Stetson	16	14		.533	27	30		.474
Belmont	15	15		.500	28	29		.491
North Florida	15	15		.500	23	31		.426
Mercer	12	15		.444	23	23		.500
East Tennessee State	10	20		.333	25	28		.472
Campbell	7	19		.269	27	24		.529
South Carolina Upstate	7	23		.233	17	37		.315

Big East Conference
	Conf				Overall			
Team	W	L	T	Pct	W	L	T	Pct
Louisville	19	7		.731	47	18		.723
South Florida	18	9		.667	34	25		.576
West Virginia	17	10		.630	37	18		.673
St. John's	16	11		.593	30	22		.577
Notre Dame	15	12		.556	35	23		.603
Connecticut	14	13		.519	36	24		.600
Pittsburgh	13	13		.500	28	21		.571
Seton Hall	13	14		.481	25	24		.510
Cincinnati	13	14		.481	29	29		.500
Georgetown	8	18		.308	16	32		.333
Rutgers	8	19		.296	22	31		.415
Villanova	6	20		.231	20	28		.417

Big South Conference
	Conf				Overall			
Team	W	L	T	Pct	W	L	T	Pct
Coastal Carolina	21	5		.808	47	16		.746
Winthrop	18	9		.667	35	25		.583
Liberty	17	9		.654	33	21		.611
Radford	16	9		.640	26	24		.520
Gardner–Webb	13	14		.481	25	25		.500
High Point	11	12		.478	21	32		.396
VMI	10	15		.400	18	35		.340
Charleston Southern	10	15		.400	16	37		.302
Presbyterian	7	19		.269	13	38		.255
UNC Asheville	5	21		.192	9	42		.176

Big Ten Conference
	Conf				Overall			
Team	W	L	T	Pct	W	L	T	Pct
Ohio State	18	6		.750	42	18		.700
Minnesota	17	6		.739	40	18		.690
Indiana	16	7		.696	32	27		.542
Illinois	16	8		.667	34	20		.630
Michigan State	13	11		.542	23	31		.426
Purdue	11	12		.478	24	26		.480
Michigan	9	15		.375	30	25		.545
Penn State	8	16		.333	25	26		.490
Northwestern	5	17		.227	12	35		.255
Iowa	4	19		.174	14	35		.286

Big West Conference
	Conf				Overall			
Team	W	L	T	Pct	W	L	T	Pct
UC Irvine	22	2		.917	45	15		.750
Cal State Fullerton	17	7		.708	47	16		.746
Cal Poly	14	10		.583	37	21		.638
UC Riverside	12	12		.500	33	20		.623
UC Santa Barbara	11	13		.458	28	23		.549
Long Beach State	11	13		.458	25	29		.463
Pacific	9	15		.375	21	32		.396
Cal State Northridge	7	17		.292	24	32		.429
UC Davis	5	19		.208	13	42		.236

Big 12 Conference
	Conf				Overall			
Team	W	L	T	Pct	W	L	T	Pct
Texas	17	9	1	.648	50	16	1	.754
Oklahoma	17	10		.630	43	20		.683
Kansas	16	12		.571	37	24		.607
Missouri	16	12		.571	35	27		.565
Kansas State	14	11	1	.558	43	18	1	.702
Texas A&M	14	13		.519	37	24		.607
Texas Tech	12	15		.444	24	32		.429
Baylor	10	16		.385	30	26		.536
Oklahoma State	9	16		.360	33	24		.579
Nebraska	8	19		.296	25	28	1	.472

Colonial Athletic Association
	Conf				Overall			
Team	W	L	T	Pct	W	L	T	Pct
George Mason	19	5		.792	42	14		.750
Georgia State	12	9		.571	36	22		.621
Northeastern	13	11		.542	28	24		.538
Old Dominion	13	11		.542	22	27		.449
UNC Wilmington	10	8		.556	31	23		.574
James Madison	12	11		.522	30	24		.556
Delaware	11	10		.524	27	20		.574
Towson	12	12		.500	28	25		.528
William & Mary	9	14		.391	24	25		.490
Virginia Commonwealth	8	16		.333	20	26		.435
Hofstra	6	18		.250	11	32		.256

Conference USA
	Conf				Overall			
Team	W	L	T	Pct	W	L	T	Pct
East Carolina	17	7		.708	46	20		.697
Rice	16	8		.667	43	18		.705
Tulane	13	11		.542	34	25		.576
Houston	13	11		.542	27	31		.466
Southern Miss	12	12		.500	40	26		.606
UAB	11	12		.478	31	26		.544
Marshall	9	15		.375	21	32		.396
Central Florida	9	15		.375	22	35		.386
Memphis	7	16		.304	21	32		.396

Horizon League
	Conf				Overall			
Team	W	L	T	Pct	W	L	T	Pct
Illinois-Chicago	17	6		.739	27	23		.540
Wisconsin-Milwaukee	14	9		.609	26	27		.491
Wright State	14	12		.538	32	30		.516
Valparaiso	12	11		.522	25	24		.510
Cleveland State	12	13		.480	19	31		.380
Youngstown State	10	14		.417	16	35		.314
Butler	6	20		.231	11	39		.220

Ivy League
	Conf				Overall			
Team	W	L	T	Pct	W	L	T	Pct
Lou Gehrig
Princeton	10	10		.500	18	19		.486
Cornell	10	10		.500	17	23		.425
Columbia	7	13		.350	11	32		.256
Penn	5	15		.250	16	23		.410
Red Rolfe
Dartmouth	16	4		.800	26	18		.591
Brown	15	5		.750	24	19	1	.557
Harvard	10	10		.500	13	28		.317
Yale	7	13		.350	13	24		.351

Metro Atlantic Athletic Conference
	Conf				Overall			
Team	W	L	T	Pct	W	L	T	Pct
Manhattan	18	6		.750	35	18		.660
Canisius	16	8		.667	36	22		.621
Marist	15	9		.625	31	28		.525
Rider	14	10		.583	26	23		.531
Niagara	14	10		.583	20	35		.364
Fairfield	10	14		.417	20	27		.426
Siena	9	15		.375	15	35		.300
Saint Peter's	7	17		.292	17	37		.315
Iona	5	19		.208	6	40	1	.138

Mid-American Conference
	Conf				Overall			
Team	W	L	T	Pct	W	L	T	Pct
East
Bowling Green	18	8		.692	27	22		.551
Ohio	18	9		.667	26	24		.520
Kent State	17	9		.654	41	17		.707
Miami (OH)	15	12		.556	30	25		.545
Akron	12	15		.444	18	33		.353
Buffalo	6	20		.231	19	35		.352
West
Ball State	14	10		.583	26	25		.510
Toledo	14	12		.538	23	29		.442
Eastern Michigan	13	14		.481	25	35		.417
Central Michigan	12	15		.444	25	30		.455
Northern Illinois	10	16		.385	19	34		.358
Western Michigan	9	18		.333	14	35		.286

Mid-Eastern Athletic Conference
	Conf				Overall			
Team	W	L	T	Pct	W	L	T	Pct
Bethune-Cookman	16	2		.889	32	28		.533
Delaware State	10	8		.556	16	25	1	.393
Florida A&M	9	8		.529	19	30		.388
Norfolk State	9	9		.500	22	23		.489
North Carolina A&T	9	8		.529	21	34		.382
Maryland-Eastern Shore	9	9		.500	14	42		.250
Coppin State	0	18		.000	0	29		.000

Missouri Valley Conference
	Conf				Overall			
Team	W	L	T	Pct	W	L	T	Pct
Missouri State	17	5		.773	34	20		.630
Indiana State	15	7		.682	30	21		.588
Wichita State	11	7		.611	30	27		.526
Creighton	14	9		.609	31	25		.554
Southern Illinois	11	9		.550	24	28		.462
Illinois State	11	11		.500	24	23		.511
Northern Iowa	7	15		.318	21	26		.447
Evansville	7	17		.292	23	30		.434
Bradley	4	17		.190	17	31		.354

Mountain West Conference
	Conf				Overall			
Team	W	L	T	Pct	W	L	T	Pct
Texas Christian	15	5		.750	40	18		.690
New Mexico	15	8		.652	37	20		.649
San Diego State	15	9		.625	41	23		.641
Brigham Young	14	8		.636	30	24		.556
Nevada-Las Vegas	9	15		.375	26	32		.448
Utah	8	16		.333	28	31		.475
Air Force	3	18		.143	12	37		.245

Northeast Conference
	Conf				Overall			
Team	W	L	T	Pct	W	L	T	Pct
Wagner	16	9		.640	30	21		.588
Sacred Heart	16	10		.615	29	27	1	.518
Central Connecticut	16	11		.593	26	22		.542
Monmouth	15	11		.577	32	25		.561
Mount St. Mary's	15	11		.577	23	25		.479
Quinnipiac	11	17		.393	18	34		.346
Fairleigh Dickinson	11	17		.393	16	34		.320
Long Island	6	20		.231	10	39		.204

Ohio Valley Conference
	Conf				Overall			
Team	W	L	T	Pct	W	L	T	Pct
Eastern Illinois	13	4		.765	33	14		.702
Murray State	13	8	1	.614	31	21	1	.594
Southeast Missouri State	12	10		.545	25	23		.521
Morehead State	12	10		.545	19	32		.373
Tennessee Tech	10	11	1	.477	30	23	1	.565
Jacksonville State	10	13		.435	31	26		.544
Eastern Kentucky	10	13		.435	24	24		.500
Austin Peay State	7	12		.368	22	30		.423
Tennessee–Martin	9	15		.375	19	30		.388

Pacific-10 Conference
	Conf				Overall			
Team	W	L	T	Pct	W	L	T	Pct
Arizona State	21	6		.792	51	14		.785
Washington State	19	8		.704	32	25		.561
Oregon State	15	12		.556	37	19		.661
UCLA	15	12		.556	27	29		.482
Arizona	13	14		.481	30	25		.545
Stanford	13	14		.481	30	25		.545
USC	13	14		.481	28	28		.500
Washington	13	14		.481	24	29		.453
California	9	18		.333	24	29		.453
Oregon	4	23		.148	14	42		.250

Patriot League
	Conf				Overall			
Team	W	L	T	Pct	W	L	T	Pct
Army	13	7		.650	36	21		.632
Bucknell	13	7		.650	21	25		.457
Holy Cross	11	7		.611	22	27		.449
Lafayette	9	11		.450	24	29		.453
Navy	8	12		.400	20	26	1	.436
Lehigh	4	14		.222	11	36	1	.240

Southeastern Conference
	Conf				Overall			
Team	W	L	T	Pct	W	L	T	Pct
East
Florida	19	11		.633	42	22		.656
South Carolina	17	13		.567	40	23		.635
Georgia	15	15		.500	38	24		.613
Vanderbilt	12	17		.414	37	27		.578
Kentucky	12	18		.400	28	26		.518
Tennessee	11	19		.367	26	29		.473
West
LSU	20	10		.667	56	17		.767
Ole Miss	20	10		.667	44	20		.688
Alabama	18	11		.621	37	21		.638
Arkansas	14	15		.483	41	24		.631
Auburn	11	19		.367	31	25		.554
Mississippi State	9	20		.310	25	29		.463

Southern Conference
	Conf				Overall			
Team	W	L	T	Pct	W	L	T	Pct
Elon	23	4		.852	41	18		.695
Georgia Southern	20	8		.714	42	17		.712
The Citadel	20	10		.667	37	22		.627
Western Carolina	19	10		.655	35	22		.614
College of Charleston	17	13		.567	35	22		.614
Appalachian State	15	13		.536	33	21		.611
Davidson	11	16		.407	18	31		.367
Furman	10	20		.333	24	31		.436
Samford	9	21		.300	17	35		.327
UNC Greensboro	7	21		.250	20	29		.408
Wofford	7	22		.241	17	32		.347

Southland Conference
	Conf				Overall			
Team	W	L	T	Pct	W	L	T	Pct
East
Southeastern Louisiana	21	12		.636	37	22		.627
Lamar	20	13		.606	38	22		.633
Northwestern State	18	13		.581	26	26		.500
Central Arkansas	10	21		.323	22	30		.423
McNeese State	10	22		.312	21	30		.412
Nicholls State	8	23		.258	17	31		.354
West
Texas State	24	7		.774	41	17		.707
Texas-San Antonio	20	12		.625	32	24		.571
Texas-Arlington	19	13		.594	28	26		.519
Sam Houston State	18	14		.562	36	24		.600
Stephen F. Austin	14	18		.438	23	32		.418
Texas A&M-Corpus Christi	9	23		.281	17	38		.309

Southwestern Athletic Conference
	Conf				Overall			
Team	W	L	T	Pct	W	L	T	Pct
East
Mississippi Valley State	15	5		.750	17	25		.405
Jackson State	16	10		.615	26	21		.553
Alcorn State	11	9		.550	15	18		.455
Alabama A&M	10	12		.455	10	27		.270
Alabama State	3	18		.143	3	25		.107
West
Southern	18	8		.692	30	17		.638
Arkansas-Pine Bluff	13	11		.542	17	24		.415
Grambling State	10	13		.435	16	36		.308
Texas Southern	10	14		.417	16	30		.348
Prairie View A&M	9	15		.375	13	25		.342

Summit League
	Conf				Overall			
Team	W	L	T	Pct	W	L	T	Pct
Oral Roberts	16	2		.889	33	15		.688
Southern Utah	15	7		.682	27	24		.529
South Dakota State	17	10		.630	26	30		.464
Centenary	16	10		.615	30	19		.612
North Dakota State	10	14		.417	15	27		.357
Oakland	10	18		.357	19	34		.358
Western Illinois	8	16		.333	10	32		.238
IPFW	6	21		.222	13	38		.225

Sun Belt Conference
	Conf				Overall			
Team	W	L	T	Pct	W	L	T	Pct
Middle Tennessee	21	8		.724	44	18		.710
Western Kentucky	21	8		.724	40	20		.667
Troy	18	10		.643	33	23		.589
Florida International	18	12		.600	32	23		.582
Louisiana-Lafayette	14	15		.483	27	30	1	.474
South Alabama	13	16		.448	25	30		.455
Louisiana-Monroe	12	17		.414	32	27		.542
Florida Atlantic	12	17		.414	30	26		.536
New Orleans	12	18		.400	22	33		.400
Arkansas State	12	18		.400	20	30		.400
Arkansas-Little Rock	7	21		.250	16	34		.320

Western Athletic Conference
	Conf				Overall			
Team	W	L	T	Pct	W	L	T	Pct
San Jose State	15	7		.682	40	20		.667
Louisiana Tech	13	11		.542	27	22		.551
New Mexico State	12	12		.500	40	17		.702
Fresno State	12	12		.500	32	30		.516
Hawaii	11	12		.478	32	26		.552
Nevada	10	13		.435	25	31		.446
Sacramento State	8	14		.364	23	27		.460

West Coast Conference
	Conf				Overall			
Team	W	L	T	Pct	W	L	T	Pct
Gonzaga	14	7		.667	36	18		.667
Loyola Marymount	13	8		.619	30	29		.508
Pepperdine	12	9		.571	31	23		.574
San Francisco	12	9		.571	28	28		.500
San Diego	11	10		.524	29	25		.537
Saint Mary's	9	12		.429	28	27		.509
Portland	7	14		.333	23	26		.469
Santa Clara	6	15		.286	19	34		.358

Division I Independents
Team	W	L	T	Pct
Dallas Baptist	38	17		.691
Bryant	30	22		.577
Longwood	26	22		.542
Le Moyne	24	23		.511
NYIT	19	29	1	.398
Savannah State	13	21		.382
Utah Valley	18	35		.340
Northern Colorado	14	35		.286
SIU Edwardsville	14	37		.275
Cal State Bakersfield	13	37		.260
Houston Baptist	12	36		.250
North Dakota	8	26		.235
Texas-Pan American	12	41		.226
North Carolina Central	5	34		.128
NJIT	4	33		.108
Chicago State	2	36		.053

=== Key ===
Team won the conference tournament and the automatic bid to the NCAA tournament
Conference does not have conference tournament, so team won the autobid for finishing in first
Team received at-large bid to NCAA tournament

== College World Series ==
The 2009 season marked the sixty third NCAA baseball tournament, which culminated with the eight team College World Series. The College World Series was held in Omaha, Nebraska. The eight teams played a double-elimination format, with LSU claiming their sixth championship with a two games to one series win over Texas in the final.

=== Bracket ===
First round
2	Cal State Fullerton	6
Arkansas	10
Virginia	5
3	LSU	9
2	Cal State Fullerton	5
Virginia	7
1	Texas	7
Southern Miss	6
5	Arizona State	5*
4	North Carolina	2*
Southern Miss	4
4	North Carolina	11

Second round
Arkansas	1
3	LSU	9
Virginia	3*
Arkansas	4*
1	Texas	10
5	Arizona State	6
4	North Carolina	5
5	Arizona State	12

Semifinals
3	LSU	14	-
Arkansas	5	-
1	Texas	4	-
5	Arizona State	3	-

Finals
3	LSU	7^{11}	1	11
1	Texas	6	5	4

== Award winners ==
=== Major player of the year awards ===
- Dick Howser Trophy: Stephen Strasburg, San Diego State
- Baseball America: Stephen Strasburg, San Diego State
- Collegiate Baseball: Stephen Strasburg, San Diego State
- American Baseball Coaches Association: Mike Leake, Arizona State
- Golden Spikes Award Stephen Strasburg, San Diego State

=== Major coach of the year awards ===
- American Baseball Coaches Association: Paul Mainieri, LSU
- Baseball America: Paul Mainieri, LSU
- Collegiate Baseball Coach of the Year: Paul Mainieri, LSU

=== Other major awards ===
- Johnny Bench Award (Catcher of the Year): J. T. Wise, Oklahoma
- Baseball America Freshman Of The Year: Anthony Rendon, Rice
