= North Carolina Tar Heels baseball statistical leaders =

The North Carolina Tar Heels baseball statistical leaders are individual statistical leaders of the North Carolina Tar Heels baseball program in various categories, including batting average, home runs, runs batted in, runs, hits, stolen bases, ERA, and Strikeouts. Within those areas, the lists identify single-game, single-season, and career leaders. The Tar Heels represent the University of North Carolina at Chapel Hill in the NCAA's Atlantic Coast Conference.

North Carolina began competing in intercollegiate baseball in 1867. These lists are updated through the end of the 2025 season.

== Batting Average ==
Career (min. two years, 200 at-bats)
Rk	Player	AVG	Seasons
1	Dustin Ackley	.412	2007 2008 2009
2	B.J. Surhoff	.392	1983 1984 1985
3	Brian Roberts	.389	1997 1998
4	Tim Fedroff	.379	2007 2008
5	Roy Clark	.363	1978 1979
6	Tyrell Godwin	.362	1998 1999 2000
7	Josh Horton	.360	2005 2006 2007
8	Danny Talbott	.357	1965 1966 1967
9	Kyle Seager	.353	2007 2008 2009
10	Scott Bradley	.351	1979 1980 1981

Season (min. 2.5. at-bats/per game)
Rk	Player	AVG	Season
1	Brian Roberts	.427	1997
	Jim Mooring	.427	1961
3	Dustin Ackley	.417	2009
	Dustin Ackley	.417	2008
5	Jeremy Cleveland	.410	2003
6	Tim Fedroff	.404	2008
7	Dustin Ackley	.402	2007
8	B.J. Surhoff	.400	1984
9	Manny DaSilva	.399	1994
10	Charlie Carr	.397	1966

== Home Runs ==
Career
Rk	Player	HR	Seasons
1	Vance Honeycutt	65	2022 2023 2024
2	Devy Bell	57	1984 1985 1986 1987
3	Chris Cox	49	1990 1991 1992 1993
4	Mac Horvath	47	2021 2022 2023
5	Alberto Osuna	45	2022 2023 2024
6	Chad Flack	42	2005 2006 2007 2008
7	Sean Farrell	40	2000 2001 2002 2003
	Jarrett Shearin	40	1996 1997 1998 1999
	Cookie Massey	40	1993 1994
	Scott Johnson	40	1983 1984 1985 1986

Season
Rk	Player	HR	Season
1	Vance Honeycutt	28	2024
2	Vance Honeycutt	25	2022
3	Devy Bell	24	1986
	Mac Horvath	24	2023
5	Chris Maples	23	2002
6	Dustin Ackley	22	2009
	Cookie Massey	22	1994
	Scott Johnson	22	1985
9	Parks Harber	20	2024
	Alberto Osuna	20	2022
	Michael Stoner	20	1996

Single Game
Rk	Player	HR	Season	Opponent
1	10 players	3	Most recent: Gavin Gallaher, 2025 vs. Pittsburgh	

== Runs Batted In ==
Career
Rk	Player	RBI	Seasons
1	Sean Farrell	214	2000 2001 2002 2003
	Jarrett Shearin	214	1996 1997 1998 1999
3	Chad Flack	212	2005 2006 2007 2008
4	Dustin Ackley	198	2007 2008 2009
5	Colin Moran	197	2011 2012 2013
6	Devy Bell	192	1984 1985 1986 1987
7	Pete Kumiega	187	1980 1981 1982 1983
	Ryan Earey	185	1998 1999 2000
9	Scott Johnson	177	1983 1984 1985 1986
10	Tim Federowicz	175	2006 2007 2008

Season
Rk	Player	RBI	Season
1	Colin Moran	91	2013
2	Owen Hull	87	2026
3	Marshall Hubbard	83	2004
4	Scott Johnson	81	1985
5	Chris Maples	79	2002
6	Casey Cook	78	2024
7	Cody Stubbs	76	2013
8	Kyle Seager	75	2008
9	Dustin Ackley	74	2007
10	Dustin Ackley	73	2009
	Sean Farrell	73	2002
	Steve Estroff	73	1990

Single Game
Rk	Player	RBI	Season	Opponent
1	Cookie Massey	10	1994	Marist

== Runs ==
Career
Rk	Player	R	Seasons
1	Dustin Ackley	227	2007 2008 2009
2	Jarrett Shearin	219	1996 1997 1998 1999
3	Chad Flack	207	2005 2006 2007 2008
4	Vance Honeycutt	205	2022 2023 2024
5	Adam Greenberg	201	2000 2001 2002
6	Sean Farrell	199	2000 2001 2002 2003
7	B.J. Surhoff	187	1983 1984 1985
8	Chad Prosser	186	2000 2001 2002 2003
9	Levi Michael	183	2009 2010 2011
10	Ben Bunting	180	2008 2009 2010 2011

Season
Rk	Player	R	Season
1	Vance Honeycutt	88	2024
2	Jake Schaffner	84	2026
3	Dustin Ackley	82	2008
4	Adam Greenberg	80	2002
5	Brian Roberts	79	1998
	Gavin Gallaher	79	2026
7	Tim Fedroff	78	2008
	Michael Busch	78	2019
9	B.J. Surhoff	77	1985
10	Colin Moran	76	2013
	Levi Michael	76	2010

Single Game
Rk	Player	R	Season	Opponent
1	9 players	5	Most recent: Jake Schaffner, 2026 vs. Duke	

== Hits ==
Career
Rk	Player	H	Seasons
1	Dustin Ackley	346	2007 2008 2009
2	Chad Flack	328	2005 2006 2007 2008
3	Chad Prosser	291	2000 2001 2002 2003
4	Sean Farrell	288	2000 2001 2002 2003
5	Jarrett Shearin	284	1996 1997 1998 1999
6	Chad Holbrook	273	1990 1991 1992 1993
7	Ben Bunting	266	2008 2009 2010 2011
8	B.J. Surhoff	265	1983 1984 1985
9	Josh Horton	264	2005 2006 2007
10	Kyle Seager	258	2007 2008 2009

Season
Rk	Player	H	Season
1	Dustin Ackley	119	2007
2	Dustin Ackley	116	2008
3	Tim Federowicz	115	2008
4	Chad Flack	112	2006
5	Dustin Ackley	111	2009
6	Josh Horton	107	2006
7	Kyle Seager	103	2009
	Jeremy Cleveland	103	2003
	Owen Hull	103	2026
10	Brian Roberts	102	1997

Single Game
Rk	Player	H	Season	Opponent
1	Greg Schuler	6	1982	Baptist

== Stolen Bases ==
Career
Rk	Player	SB	Seasons
1	Brian Roberts	110	1997 1998
2	Chad Holbrook	98	1990 1991 1992 1993
3	Russ Adams	93	2000 2001 2002
4	Adam Greenberg	92	2000 2001 2002
5	B.J. Surhoff	84	1983 1984 1985
6	Vance Honeycutt	76	2022 2023 2024
7	Jarrett Shearin	75	1996 1997 1998 1999
8	Dave Arendas	74	1987 1988 1989 1990
9	Steve Mrowka	71	1986 1987
10	Greg Schuler	66	1980 1981 1982 1983

Season
Rk	Player	SB	Season
1	Brian Roberts	63	1998
2	Brian Roberts	47	1997
3	Russ Adams	45	2002
	Kane Kepley	45	2025
5	Chad Holbrook	40	1993
5	Steve Mrowka	38	1986
7	Adam Greenberg	35	2002
8	Steve Mrowka	33	1987
	B.J. Surhoff	33	1984
10	Vance Honeycutt	29	2022
	Adam Greenberg	29	2001
	Tyrell Godwin	29	1999
	B.J. Surhoff	29	1985

Single Game
Rk	Player	SB	Season	Opponent
1	Steve Mrowka	5	1986	Campbell
2	Brian Roberts	5	1998	Maryland

== Earned Run Average ==
Career (min. 150 IP)
Rk	Player	ERA	Seasons
1	Bill Haywood	1.36	1963 1964
2	Wayne Young	1.53	1958 1959 1960
3	Tom Buskey	1.75	1967 1968 1969
4	Bill Paschall	1.95	1973 1974 1975 1976
5	David Kirk	2.04	1978 1979 1980
6	Mike Merritt	2.16	1972 1973 1974 1975
7	Chalmers Port	2.20	1951 1952 1953
8	Jim Raugh	2.39	1955 1956 1957
9	Scott Bankhead	2.47	1982 1983 1984
10	Roger Williams	2.51	1983 1984 1985

Season (min. 55 IP)
Rk	Player	ERA	Season
1	Garry Hill	0.70	1967
2	Wayne Young	0.89	1958
3	Eddie Hill	1.07	1970
4	Bill Haywood	1.13	1964
5	Jonathan Hovis	1.17	2006
6	Roger Williams	1.19	1983
	Brad Woodall	1.19	1989
8	Chalmers Port	1.22	1953
9	Trent Thornton	1.37	2013
10	Michael Morin	1.40	2012

== Strikeouts ==
Career
Rk	Player	K	Seasons
1	Andrew Miller	325	2004 2005 2006
2	Benton Moss	318	2012 2013 2014 2015
3	Alex White	317	2007 2008 2009
4	Patrick Johnson	311	2008 2009 2010 2011
5	J.B. Bukauskas	296	2015 2016 2017
6	Michael Hoog	289	1987 1988 1989 1990
7	Kent Emanuel	287	2011 2012 2013
8	Jim Dougherty	281	1987 1988 1989 1990
9	Thad Chrismon	279	1992 1993 1994 1995
10	Mike Bynum	276	1997 1998 1999

Season
Rk	Player	K	Season
1	Andrew Miller	133	2006
2	Austin Love	129	2021
3	Patrick Johnson	125	2011
	Sean Murphy	125	1995
5	Scott Bankhead	124	1984
6	Alex White	121	2009
7	Greg Norris	118	1978
8	J.B. Bukauskas	116	2017
9	Caden Glauber	114	2026
10	Alex White	113	2008
	Sean Murphy	113	1994
	Roger Williams	113	1983

Single Game
Rk	Player	K	Season	Opponent
1	Roger Williams	19	1985	Duke
