= 2009 College Baseball All-America Team =

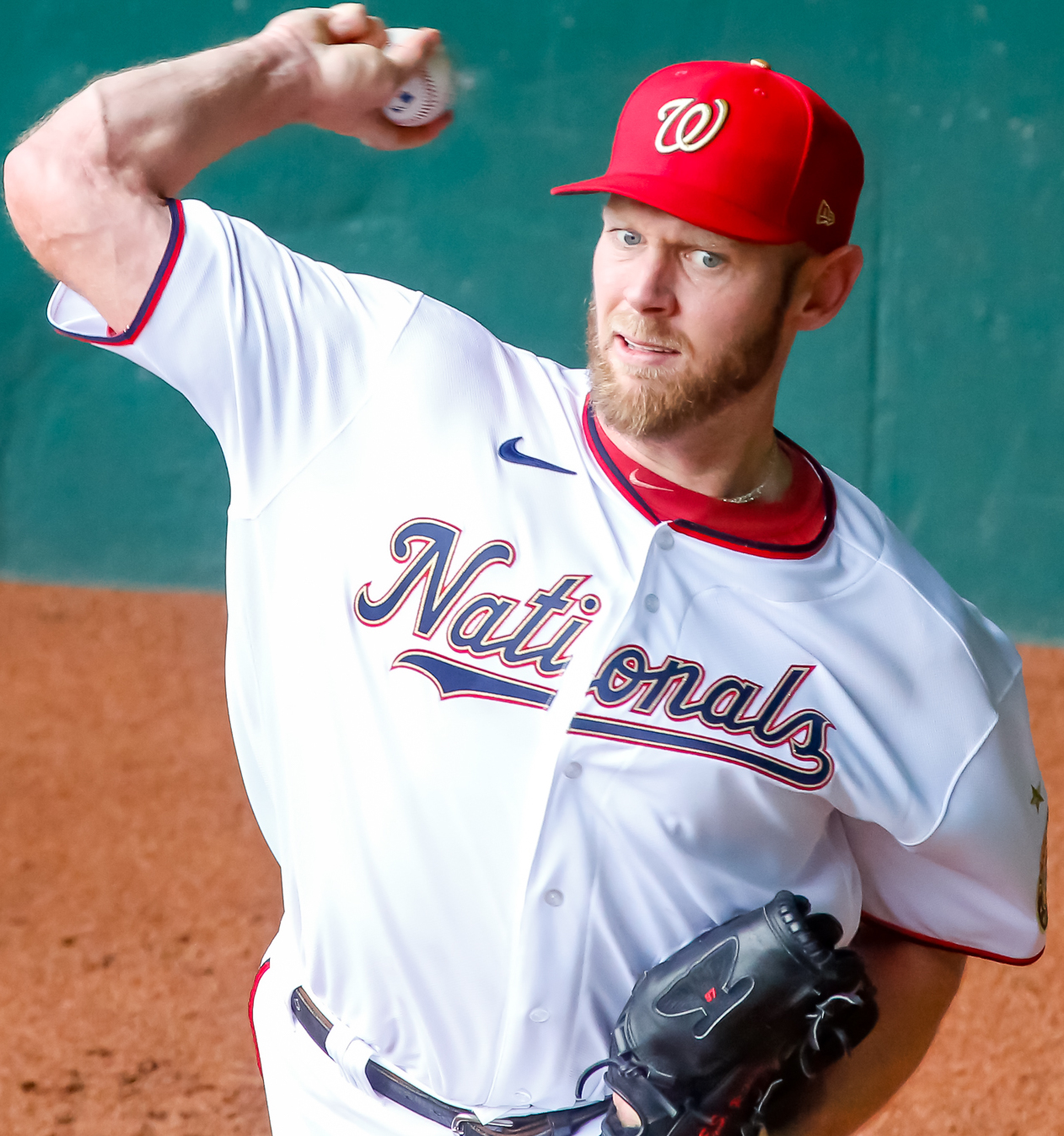
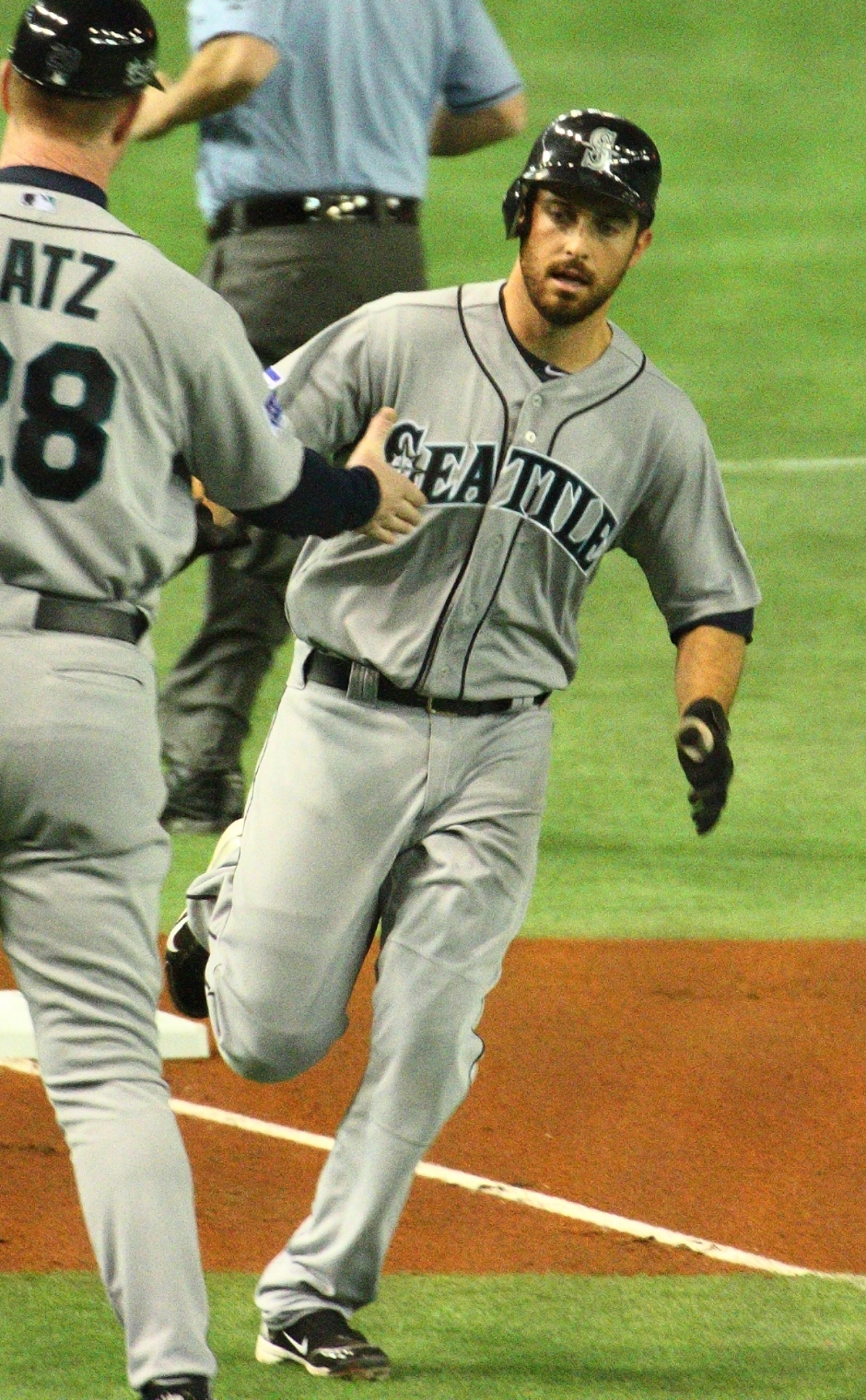
2009 All-Americans included 2010 Major League Baseball draft #1 pick Stephen Strasburg (left) and Seattle Mariners second basemen Dustin Ackley (right).

This is a list of college baseball players named first team All-Americans for the 2009 NCAA Division I baseball season. From 2006 to 2010, there were five generally recognized All-America selectors for baseball: the American Baseball Coaches Association, Baseball America, Collegiate Baseball Newspaper, the National Collegiate Baseball Writers Association, and Rivals.com. In order to be considered a "consensus" All-American, a player must have been selected by at least three of these.

== Key ==
A	American Baseball Coaches Association
B	Baseball America
C	Collegiate Baseball Newspaper
N	National Collegiate Baseball Writers Association
R	Rivals.com
	Member of the National College Baseball Hall of Fame
	Consensus All-American – selected by all five organizations
	Consensus All-American – selected by three or four organizations

== All-Americans ==
Position	Name	School	#	A	B	C	N	R	Other awards and honors
Starting pitcher	Eric Arnett	Indiana	2	✓	—	—	✓	—	
Starting pitcher	Daniel Bibona	UC Irvine	1	—	—	✓	—	—	
Starting pitcher	Louis Coleman	LSU	4	✓	✓	✓	—	✓	
Starting pitcher	Mike Leake	Arizona State	5	✓	✓	✓	✓	✓	ABCA Player of the Year
Starting pitcher	Deck McGuire	Georgia Tech	2	—	—	✓	✓	—	
Starting pitcher	A. J. Morris	Kansas State	5	✓	✓	✓	✓	✓	
Starting pitcher	Stephen Strasburg	San Diego State	5	✓	✓	✓	✓	✓	Dick Howser Trophy Golden Spikes Award Baseball America Player of the Year Collegiate Baseball Player of the Year National Pitcher of the Year First overall pick in the 2009 MLB draft
Relief pitcher	Kyle Bellamy	Miami (FL)	3	—	✓	—	✓	✓	
Relief pitcher	Jake Hale	Ohio State	1	—	—	—	✓	—	
Relief pitcher	Addison Reed	San Diego State	3	✓	—	✓	✓	—	Stopper of the Year
Relief pitcher	Austin Wood	Texas	1	—	—	—	—	✓	
Catcher	Griffin Benedict	Georgia Southern	1	—	—	—	—	✓	
Catcher	Chris Henderson	George Mason	1	—	—	✓	—	—	
Catcher	Carlos Ramirez	Arizona State	1	✓	—	—	—	—	
Catcher	Tony Sanchez	Boston College	1	—	✓	—	—	—	
Catcher	J. T. Wise	Oklahoma	1	—	—	—	✓	—	Johnny Bench Award
First baseman	Dustin Ackley	North Carolina	5	✓	✓	✓	✓	✓	
Second baseman	Derek McCallum	Minnesota	4	✓	✓	—	✓	✓	
Second baseman	Chris Sedon	Pittsburgh	1	—	—	✓	—	—	
Shortstop	Stephen Cardullo	Florida State	1	—	✓	—	—	—	
Shortstop	Bryan Marquez	New Mexico State	3	✓	—	✓	—	✓	
Shortstop	Ben Orloff	UC Irvine	1	—	—	—	✓	—	Brooks Wallace Award
Third baseman	Chris Dominguez	Louisville	2	—	✓	✓	—	—	
Third baseman / OF	Marc Krauss	Ohio	3	✓	✓	✓	—	—	
Third baseman	Tommy Mendonca	Fresno State	2	—	—	—	✓	✓	
Outfielder	Jason Kipnis	Arizona State	5	✓	✓	✓	✓	✓	
Outfielder	Kent Matthes	Alabama	5	✓	✓	✓	✓	✓	
Outfielder	Jarrett Parker	Virginia	1	—	—	—	—	✓	
Outfielder	Tyler Townsend	FIU	3	✓	—	✓	✓	—	
Designated hitter	Matt Alexander	Air Force	1	—	—	—	✓	—	
Designated hitter	Rich Poythress	Georgia	2	—	✓	—	—	✓	
Designated hitter	Kyle Roller	East Carolina	1	✓	—	—	—	—	
Utility player	Bryce Brentz	Middle Tennessee	5	✓	✓	✓	✓	✓	
Utility player	Danny Hultzen	Virginia	1	✓	—	—	—	—	

== See also ==
- List of college baseball awards
