= 2009 ACC tournament =

2009 ACC tournament may refer to:

- 2009 ACC men's basketball tournament
- 2009 ACC women's basketball tournament
- 2009 ACC men's soccer tournament
- 2009 ACC women's soccer tournament
- 2009 Atlantic Coast Conference baseball tournament
- 2009 Atlantic Coast Conference softball tournament
