= 2009 Atlantic Coast Conference baseball tournament =

American college baseball tournament

- 2009 ACC baseball tournament logo
- Teams: 8
- Format: 2 division round robin and championship game
- Finals site: Durham Bulls Athletic Park; Durham, NC
- Champions: Virginia Cavaliers (2nd title)
- Winning coach: Brian O'Connor (1st title)
- MVP: Dan Grovatt (Virginia Cavaliers)
- Television: RSN

2009 Atlantic Coast Conference baseball standings
| | Conf. | | | | Overall |
| Team | W | | L | PCT | W | | L | PCT |
|---|---|---|---|---|---|---|---|---|
Atlantic
| No. 10 Florida State ^{x}‍‍‍^{y} | 19 | – | 9 | .679 | 45 | – | 18 | .714 |
| No. 15 Clemson ‍‍‍^{y} | 19 | – | 11 | .633 | 44 | – | 22 | .667 |
| Boston College ‍‍‍^{y} | 13 | – | 15 | .464 | 34 | – | 26 | .567 |
| Maryland ‍‍‍ | 10 | – | 20 | .333 | 27 | – | 27 | .500 |
| NC State ‍‍‍ | 10 | – | 20 | .333 | 25 | – | 31 | .446 |
| Wake Forest ‍‍‍ | 6 | – | 24 | .200 | 22 | – | 30 | .423 |
Coastal
| No. 5 North Carolina ^{x}‍‍‍^{y} | 19 | – | 10 | .655 | 48 | – | 18 | .727 |
| No. 18 Georgia Tech ‍‍‍^{y} | 17 | – | 10 | .630 | 38 | – | 19 | .667 |
| No. 20 Miami ‍‍‍^{y} | 18 | – | 12 | .600 | 38 | – | 22 | .633 |
| No. 6 Virginia ‍‍‡‍^{y} | 16 | – | 11 | .593 | 49 | – | 15 | .766 |
| Duke ‍‍‍ | 15 | – | 15 | .500 | 35 | – | 24 | .593 |
| Virginia Tech ‍‍‍ | 12 | – | 17 | .414 | 32 | – | 21 | .604 |
x – Division champion ‡ – Tournament champion y – Invited to the NCAA tournament As of June 30, 2009; Rankings from Collegiate Baseball

Original 2009 ACC Baseball Championship logo

The 2009 Atlantic Coast Conference baseball tournament was held at Durham Bulls Athletic Park in Durham, North Carolina, from May 20 through 24. It was the first time the tournament has been played at the ballpark since 1999 and fourth time overall since the ballpark opened in 1995. The #6 seeded Virginia Cavaliers won the tournament with a perfect 4–0 record, earning the Atlantic Coast Conference's automatic bid to the 2009 NCAA Division I baseball tournament. It was Virginia's first conference championship in baseball since 1996, and their second tournament championship ever.

The tournament was originally scheduled to be contested at Fenway Park in Boston, home of Major League Baseball's Boston Red Sox. But on August 14, 2008, it was announced by Fenway Sports Group, along with the Atlantic Coast Conference, that the location of the tournament would have to be changed due to a scheduling error. The ACC chose the Bulls' ballpark as Fenway's replacement.

2009 was the third year in which the conference used a round robin tournament format, with the team with the best record in each group at the end of the three-game round robin advancing to a one-game championship.

== Seeding ==
From TheACC.com:

The top two teams from both the Atlantic and Coastal divisions, as determined by conference winning percentage, in addition to the four teams with the next best conference winning percentage, regardless of division, will be selected to participate in the ACC Baseball Championship. The two division champions will automatically be seeded number one and two based on winning percentage in overall conference competition. The remaining teams will be seeded (three through eight) based on winning percentage in overall conference competition without regard to division. All ties will be broken using the tie-breaking provisions.

| Team | W | L | T | Pct | GB | Seed |
|---|---|---|---|---|---|---|
Atlantic Division
| Florida State | 19 | 9 | | .679 | | 1 |
| Clemson | 19 | 11 | | .633 | 1 | 3 |
| Boston College | 13 | 15 | | .464 | 6 | 8 |
| Maryland | 10 | 20 | | .333 | 10 | |
| NC State | 10 | 20 | | .333 | 10 | |
| Wake Forest | 6 | 24 | | .200 | 14 | |

| Team | W | L | T | Pct | GB | Seed |
|---|---|---|---|---|---|---|
Coastal Division
| North Carolina | 19 | 10 | | .655 | | 2 |
| Georgia Tech | 17 | 10 | 1 | .625 | 1.5 | 4 |
| Miami | 18 | 12 | | .600 | 1.5 | 5 |
| Virginia | 16 | 11 | 1 | .589 | 2.5 | 6 |
| Duke | 15 | 15 | | .500 | 4.5 | 7 |
| Virginia Tech | 12 | 17 | | .414 | 7 | |

== Tournament ==
| | Division A | FSU | GT | MIA | BC | Overall |
| 1 | Florida State (19–9) | | L 2–9 | W 4–2 | W 7–2 | 2–1^{1} |
| 4 | Georgia Tech (17–10–1) | W 9–2 | | L 6–8 | L 3–7 | 1–2 |
| 5 | Miami (17–12) | L 1–4 | W 8–6 | | L 1–10 | 1–2 |
| 8 | Boston College (13–15) | L 2–7 | W 7–3 | W 10–1 | | 2–1^{1} |

| | Division B | UNC | CLEM | UVA | DUKE | Overall |
| 2 | North Carolina (19–10) | | L 3–4^{†} | L 1–11^{‡} | W 8–3 | 1–2 |
| 3 | Clemson (19–11) | W 4–3^{†} | | L 5–6 | L 4–10 | 1–2 |
| 6 | Virginia (16–11–1) | W11–1^{‡} | W 6–5 | | W 11–7 | 3–0 |
| 7 | Duke (15–15) | L 3–8 | W 10–4 | L 7–11 | | 1–2 |

| Finals |
| A | #1 Florida State | 3 |
| B | #6 Virginia | 6 |

Notes
† - Denotes extra innings
‡ - Denotes game shortened due to Mercy Rule
1 - Florida State beat Boston College head-to-head

== Results ==
=== Division A ===
| Team | 1 | 2 | 3 | 4 | 5 | 6 | 7 | 8 | 9 | R | H | E |
|---|---|---|---|---|---|---|---|---|---|---|---|---|
| #5 Miami | 0 | 0 | 0 | 1 | 0 | 7 | 0 | 0 | 0 | 8 | 9 | 1 |
| #4 Georgia Tech | 1 | 0 | 0 | 1 | 0 | 2 | 2 | 0 | 0 | 6 | 12 | 1 |

| Team | 1 | 2 | 3 | 4 | 5 | 6 | 7 | 8 | 9 | R | H | E |
|---|---|---|---|---|---|---|---|---|---|---|---|---|
| #8 Boston College | 0 | 0 | 0 | 0 | 0 | 1 | 0 | 1 | 0 | 2 | 9 | 1 |
| #1 Florida State | 0 | 0 | 0 | 2 | 0 | 2 | 3 | 0 | X | 7 | 7 | 0 |

| Team | 1 | 2 | 3 | 4 | 5 | 6 | 7 | 8 | 9 | R | H | E |
|---|---|---|---|---|---|---|---|---|---|---|---|---|
| #4 Georgia Tech | 0 | 0 | 0 | 0 | 3 | 0 | 0 | 0 | 0 | 3 | 7 | 1 |
| #8 Boston College | 2 | 0 | 2 | 0 | 1 | 2 | 0 | 0 | X | 7 | 9 | 0 |

| Team | 1 | 2 | 3 | 4 | 5 | 6 | 7 | 8 | 9 | R | H | E |
|---|---|---|---|---|---|---|---|---|---|---|---|---|
| #1 Florida State | 4 | 0 | 0 | 0 | 0 | 0 | 0 | 0 | 0 | 4 | 6 | 0 |
| #5 Miami | 0 | 0 | 0 | 1 | 0 | 1 | 0 | 0 | 0 | 2 | 4 | 2 |

| Team | 1 | 2 | 3 | 4 | 5 | 6 | 7 | 8 | 9 | R | H | E |
|---|---|---|---|---|---|---|---|---|---|---|---|---|
| #8 Boston College | 0 | 4 | 0 | 0 | 3 | 0 | 3 | 0 | 0 | 10 | 12 | 1 |
| #5 Miami | 0 | 0 | 0 | 0 | 0 | 0 | 1 | 0 | 0 | 1 | 9 | 1 |

| Team | 1 | 2 | 3 | 4 | 5 | 6 | 7 | 8 | 9 | R | H | E |
|---|---|---|---|---|---|---|---|---|---|---|---|---|
| #4 Georgia Tech | 0 | 1 | 3 | 0 | 1 | 1 | 2 | 1 | 0 | 9 | 10 | 0 |
| #1 Florida State | 0 | 0 | 0 | 1 | 0 | 0 | 0 | 1 | 0 | 2 | 10 | 1 |

=== Division B ===
| Team | 1 | 2 | 3 | 4 | 5 | 6 | 7 | 8 | 9 | R | H | E |
|---|---|---|---|---|---|---|---|---|---|---|---|---|
| #7 Duke | 0 | 0 | 0 | 0 | 0 | 1 | 0 | 0 | 2 | 3 | 7 | 0 |
| #2 North Carolina | 2 | 0 | 0 | 2 | 0 | 2 | 1 | 1 | X | 8 | 13 | 1 |

| Team | 1 | 2 | 3 | 4 | 5 | 6 | 7 | 8 | 9 | R | H | E |
|---|---|---|---|---|---|---|---|---|---|---|---|---|
| #6 Virginia | 0 | 0 | 0 | 2 | 4 | 0 | 0 | 0 | 0 | 6 | 10 | 1 |
| #3 Clemson | 0 | 1 | 3 | 1 | 0 | 0 | 0 | 0 | 0 | 5 | 7 | 2 |

| Team | 1 | 2 | 3 | 4 | 5 | 6 | 7 | 8 | 9 | R | H | E |
|---|---|---|---|---|---|---|---|---|---|---|---|---|
| #3 Clemson | 0 | 1 | 0 | 0 | 0 | 0 | 0 | 3 | 0 | 4 | 11 | 3 |
| #7 Duke | 0 | 1 | 1 | 0 | 0 | 6 | 2 | 0 | X | 10 | 11 | 3 |

| Team | 1 | 2 | 3 | 4 | 5 | 6 | 7 | 8 | 9 | R | H | E |
|---|---|---|---|---|---|---|---|---|---|---|---|---|
| #2 North Carolina | 0 | 0 | 0 | 0 | 1 | 0 | 0 | 0 | - | 1 | 5 | 0 |
| #6 Virginia | 0 | 0 | 10 | 0 | 0 | 0 | 0 | 1^{1} | - | 11 | 14 | 0 |

1 - Game ended in the bottom of the eighth inning due to the Mercy Rule.

| Team | 1 | 2 | 3 | 4 | 5 | 6 | 7 | 8 | 9 | 10 | 11 | R | H | E |
|---|---|---|---|---|---|---|---|---|---|---|---|---|---|---|
| #2 North Carolina | 0 | 0 | 1 | 0 | 1 | 0 | 0 | 0 | 1 | 0 | 0 | 3 | 11 | 2 |
| #3 Clemson | 0 | 1 | 1 | 1 | 0 | 0 | 0 | 0 | 0 | 0 | 1 | 4 | 13 | 3 |

| Team | 1 | 2 | 3 | 4 | 5 | 6 | 7 | 8 | 9 | R | H | E |
|---|---|---|---|---|---|---|---|---|---|---|---|---|
| #6 Virginia | 0 | 0 | 0 | 1 | 0 | 1 | 7 | 1 | 1 | 11 | 11 | 2 |
| #7 Duke | 0 | 0 | 3 | 1 | 0 | 0 | 0 | 3 | 0 | 7 | 10 | 1 |

=== Championship final ===
| Team | 1 | 2 | 3 | 4 | 5 | 6 | 7 | 8 | 9 | R | H | E |
|---|---|---|---|---|---|---|---|---|---|---|---|---|
| #6 Virginia | 0 | 1 | 0 | 2 | 0 | 0 | 0 | 0 | 3 | 6 | 8 | 0 |
| #1 Florida State | 2 | 0 | 1 | 0 | 0 | 0 | 0 | 0 | 0 | 3 | 9 | 3 |

== All-Tournament Team ==
| Position | Player | School |
|---|---|---|
| 1B | Dustin Ackley | North Carolina |
| 2B | Jason Stidham | Florida State |
| 3B | Mickey Wiswall | Boston College |
| SS | Jake Lemmerman | Duke |
| C | Franco Valdes | Virginia |
| OF | Dan Grovatt | Virginia |
| OF | Wilson Boyd | Clemson |
| OF | Mike McGee | Florida State |
| DH/UT | Danny Hultzen | Virginia |
| P | Pat Dean | Boston College |
| P | Casey Harman | Clemson |
| MVP | Dan Grovatt | Virginia |

(*)Denotes Unanimous Selection

== See also ==
- 2009 College World Series
- 2009 NCAA Division I baseball tournament
- News & Record - Aug 14 2008 - Fenway Out, Greensboro Seeks Event
