= 2009 North Carolina Tar Heels baseball team =

American college baseball season

2009 North Carolina Tar Heels baseball

Atlantic Coast Conference champions Chapel Hill Regional champions Chapel Hill Super Regional champions

College World Series, T-5th
- Conference: Atlantic Coast

Ranking
- Coaches: No. 4
- CB: No. 5
- Record: 48–18 (19–10 ACC)
- Head coach: Mike Fox (11th season)
- Assistant coaches: Scott Jackson (1st season); Matt McCay (2nd season)
- Pitching coach: Scott Forbes (4th season)
- Home stadium: Boshamer Stadium

2009 Atlantic Coast Conference baseball standings
	Conf.				Overall
Team	W		L	PCT	W		L	PCT
Atlantic
No. 10 Florida State ^{x}‍‍‍^{y}	19	–	9	.679	45	–	18	.714
No. 15 Clemson ‍‍‍^{y}	19	–	11	.633	44	–	22	.667
Boston College ‍‍‍^{y}	13	–	15	.464	34	–	26	.567
Maryland ‍‍‍	10	–	20	.333	27	–	27	.500
NC State ‍‍‍	10	–	20	.333	25	–	31	.446
Wake Forest ‍‍‍	6	–	24	.200	22	–	30	.423
Coastal
No. 5 North Carolina ^{x}‍‍‍^{y}	19	–	10	.655	48	–	18	.727
No. 18 Georgia Tech ‍‍‍^{y}	17	–	10	.630	38	–	19	.667
No. 20 Miami ‍‍‍^{y}	18	–	12	.600	38	–	22	.633
No. 6 Virginia ‍‍‡‍^{y}	16	–	11	.593	49	–	15	.766
Duke ‍‍‍	15	–	15	.500	35	–	24	.593
Virginia Tech ‍‍‍	12	–	17	.414	32	–	21	.604
x – Division champion ‡ – Tournament champion y – Invited to the NCAA tournament As of June 30, 2009; Rankings from Collegiate Baseball

The 2009 North Carolina Tar Heels baseball team represented University of North Carolina at Chapel Hill in the 2009 NCAA Division I baseball season. The Tar Heels played their home games at Boshamer Stadium. The team was coached by Mike Fox in his 11th year as head coach at North Carolina.

The Tar Heels won the Chapel Hill Regional and the Chapel Hill Regional Super Regional to advance to the College World Series, where they were defeated by the Arizona State Sun Devils.

== Roster ==
2009 North Carolina Tar Heels baseball team
Players
Coaches

#	Pos.	Name	B/T	Height	Weight	Year	Home town
1	INF	Levi Michael	S/R	5 ft 10 in (1.78 m)	170 lb (77 kg)	Fr	Welcome, North Carolina
2	OF	Landon Adams	S/R	5 ft 9 in (1.75 m)	150 lb (68 kg)	Fr	Raleigh, North Carolina
3	OF	Ben Bunting	L/L	5 ft 7 in (1.7 m)	157 lb (71 kg)	So	Randleman, North Carolina
4	INF	Garrett Gore	R/R	5 ft 10 in (1.78 m)	177 lb (80 kg)	Sr	Wilmington, North Carolina
5	C	Jacob Stallings	R/R	6 ft 5 in (1.96 m)	185 lb (84 kg)	Fr	Brentwood, Tennessee
6	RHP	Alex White	R/R	6 ft 3 in (1.91 m)	193 lb (88 kg)	Jr	Greenville, North Carolina
7	RHP	Ryan Leach	R/R	5 ft 11 in (1.8 m)	170 lb (77 kg)	So	Kings Mountain, North Carolina
8	C	Mark Fluery	L/R	6 ft 0 in (1.83 m)	202 lb (92 kg)	So	Roswell, Georgia
10	INF	Kyle Seager	L/R	6 ft 1 in (1.85 m)	194 lb (88 kg)	Jr	Kannapolis, North Carolina
11	OF	Mike Cavasinni	L/R	5 ft 7 in (1.7 m)	160 lb (73 kg)	RS Jr	Huntersville, North Carolina
12	LHP	Logan Munson	L/L	6 ft 0 in (1.83 m)	205 lb (93 kg)	So	Columbia, South Carolina
13	INF	Dustin Ackley	L/R	6 ft 1 in (1.85 m)	185 lb (84 kg)	Jr	Walnut Cove, North Carolina
14	RHP	Greg Holt	R/R	6 ft 1 in (1.85 m)	205 lb (93 kg)	So	Clemmons, North Carolina
16	OF	Seth Baldwin	L/R	6 ft 0 in (1.83 m)	196 lb (89 kg)	Fr	Forest City, North Carolina
17	RHP	Patrick Johnson	R/R	5 ft 10 in (1.78 m)	170 lb (77 kg)	So	Conover, North Carolina
19	C	Jeff May	R/R	6 ft 1 in (1.85 m)	205 lb (93 kg)	Fr	Stem, North Carolina
20	RHP	Garrett Davis	L/R	6 ft 4 in (1.93 m)	195 lb (88 kg)	RS Fr	Fremont, North Carolina
23	INF	Matt Harrison	R/R	5 ft 11 in (1.8 m)	175 lb (79 kg)	Fr	Henderson, Nevada
24	INF	Ryan Graepel	R/R	6 ft 1 in (1.85 m)	169 lb (77 kg)	Jr	Greenville, North Carolina
25	RHP	Colin Bates	R/R	6 ft 1 in (1.85 m)	179 lb (81 kg)	RS So	Naperville, Illinois
28	RHP	Adam Warren	R/R	6 ft 2 in (1.88 m)	200 lb (91 kg)	Sr	New Bern, North Carolina
29	RHP	Nate Striz	R/R	6 ft 2 in (1.88 m)	240 lb (109 kg)	So	Lakeland, Florida
31	RHP	Jimmy Messer	R/R	6 ft 1 in (1.85 m)	195 lb (88 kg)	Fr	Hudson, North Carolina
32	RHP	Bryant Gaines	R/R	6 ft 6 in (1.98 m)	261 lb (118 kg)	RS So	Weddington, North Carolina
36	INF	Brett Thomas	L/L	6 ft 4 in (1.93 m)	215 lb (98 kg)	So	Columbia, South Carolina
38	C	Mike McKee	R/R	5 ft 10 in (1.78 m)	174 lb (79 kg)	Sr	Arden, North Carolina
39	INF	Tarron Robinson	L/L	6 ft 2 in (1.88 m)	206 lb (93 kg)	RS Fr	Chapel Hill, North Carolina
43	RHP	Matt Harvey	R/R	6 ft 4 in (1.93 m)	210 lb (95 kg)	So	Mystic, Connecticut
46	LHP	Brian Moran	L/L	6 ft 3 in (1.91 m)	188 lb (85 kg)	Jr	Rye, New York

Head coach

30 Mike Fox

Assistant coach(es)

15 Scott Jackson

Hitting coach(es)

18 Matt McCay

Pitching coach(es)

21 Scott Forbes

Legend

- (C) Team captain
- (S) Suspended
- (I) Ineligible
- Injured
- Current redshirt

Roster
Last update: January 4, 2022

== Schedule ==
2009 North Carolina Tar Heels baseball game log
Regular season
February (7–1)

#	Date	Opponent	Site/stadium	Score	Overall record	ACC record
1	February 20	VMI	Boshamer Stadium • Chapel Hill, North Carolina	13–3	1–0	–
2	February 21	VMI	Boshamer Stadium • Chapel Hill, North Carolina	6–0	2–0	–
3	February 22	VMI	Boshamer Stadium • Chapel Hill, North Carolina	11–3	3–0	–
4	February 24	Costal Carolina	Boshamer Stadium • Chapel Hill, North Carolina	3–7	3–1	–
5	February 25	Liberty	Boshamer Stadium • Chapel Hill, North Carolina	9–5	4–1	–
6	February 27	Seton Hall	Boshamer Stadium • Chapel Hill, North Carolina	5–1	5–1	–
7	February 27	Seton Hall	Boshamer Stadium • Chapel Hill, North Carolina	4–3	6–1	–
8	February 28	Seton Hall	Boshamer Stadium • Chapel Hill, North Carolina	10–3	7–1	–

March (14–5)

#	Date	Opponent	Site/stadium	Score	Overall record	ACC record
9	March 4	Gardner–Webb	Boshamer Stadium • Chapel Hill, North Carolina	10–3	8–1	–
10	March 6	Clemson	Boshamer Stadium • Chapel Hill, North Carolina	4–5	8–2	0–1
11	March 7	Clemson	Boshamer Stadium • Chapel Hill, North Carolina	5–2	9–2	1–1
12	March 8	Clemson	Boshamer Stadium • Chapel Hill, North Carolina	9–8	10–2	2–1
13	March 10	Appalachian State	Boshamer Stadium • Chapel Hill, North Carolina	9–8	11–2	2–1
14	March 11	Appalachian State	Boshamer Stadium • Chapel Hill, North Carolina	12–3	12–2	2–1
15	March 13	at Virginia Tech	English Field • Blacksburg, Virginia	7–3	13–2	3–1
16	March 15	at Virginia Tech	English Field • Blacksburg, Virginia	13–5	14–2	4–1
17	March 17	Princeton	Boshamer Stadium • Chapel Hill, North Carolina	17–0	15–2	4–1
18	March 18	Princeton	Boshamer Stadium • Chapel Hill, North Carolina	6–1	16–2	4–1
19	March 20	Duke	Boshamer Stadium • Chapel Hill, North Carolina	8–5	17–2	5–1
20	March 21	Duke	Boshamer Stadium • Chapel Hill, North Carolina	4–5	17–3	5–2
21	March 22	Duke	Boshamer Stadium • Chapel Hill, North Carolina	9–10	17–4	5–3
22	March 24	at UNC Wilmington	Brooks Field • Wilmington, North Carolina	8–1	18–4	5–3
23	March 25	Charlotte	Boshamer Stadium • Chapel Hill, North Carolina	1–2	18–5	5–3
24	March 27	Virginia	Boshamer Stadium • Chapel Hill, North Carolina	4–3	19–5	6–3
25	March 28	Virginia	Boshamer Stadium • Chapel Hill, North Carolina	2–5	19–6	6–4
26	March 29	Virginia	Boshamer Stadium • Chapel Hill, North Carolina	6–5	20–6	7–4
27	March 31	Davidson	Boshamer Stadium • Chapel Hill, North Carolina	9–4	21–6	7–4

April (14–5)

#	Date	Opponent	Site/stadium	Score	Overall record	ACC record
28	April 1	Old Dominion	Boshamer Stadium • Chapel Hill, North Carolina	7–6	22–6	7–4
29	April 3	at Georgia Tech	Russ Chandler Stadium • Atlanta, Georgia	4–2	23–6	8–4
30	April 4	at Georgia Tech	Russ Chandler Stadium • Atlanta, Georgia	6–10	23–7	8–5
31	April 5	at Georgia Tech	Russ Chandler Stadium • Atlanta, Georgia	13–10	24–7	9–5
32	April 7	East Carolina	Boshamer Stadium • Chapel Hill, North Carolina	3–1	25–7	9–5
33	April 8	Richmond	Boshamer Stadium • Chapel Hill, North Carolina	12–8	26–7	9–5
34	April 10	at Florida State	Mike Martin Field at Dick Howser Stadium • Tallahassee, Florida	2–3	26–8	9–6
35	April 11	at Florida State	Mike Martin Field at Dick Howser Stadium • Tallahassee, Florida	12–7	27–8	10–6
36	April 12	at Florida State	Mike Martin Field at Dick Howser Stadium • Tallahassee, Florida	8–9	27–9	10–7
37	April 14	High Point	Boshamer Stadium • Chapel Hill, North Carolina	9–11	27–10	10–7
38	April 15	Winthrop	Boshamer Stadium • Chapel Hill, North Carolina	20–4	28–10	10–7
39	April 17	Miami (FL)	Boshamer Stadium • Chapel Hill, North Carolina	3–0	29–10	11–7
40	April 18	Miami (FL)	Boshamer Stadium • Chapel Hill, North Carolina	5–4	30–10	12–7
41	April 19	Miami (FL)	Boshamer Stadium • Chapel Hill, North Carolina	4–1	31–10	13–7
42	April 21	UNC Wilmington	Boshamer Stadium • Chapel Hill, North Carolina	7–5	32–10	13–7
43	April 22	at East Carolina	Clark–LeClair Stadium • Greenville, North Carolina	0–4	32–11	13–7
44	April 24	Maryland	Boshamer Stadium • Chapel Hill, North Carolina	7–4	33–11	14–7
45	April 25	Maryland	Boshamer Stadium • Chapel Hill, North Carolina	14–3	34–11	15–7
46	April 26	Maryland	Boshamer Stadium • Chapel Hill, North Carolina	4–2	35–11	16–7

May (6–3)

#	Date	Opponent	Site/stadium	Score	Overall record	ACC record
47	May 5	Elon	Boshamer Stadium • Chapel Hill, North Carolina	15–6	36–11	16–7
48	May 7	Longwood	Boshamer Stadium • Chapel Hill, North Carolina	5–4	37–11	16–7
49	May 8	at NC State	Doak Field • Raleigh, North Carolina	0–3	37–12	16–8
50	May 9	at NC State	Doak Field • Raleigh, North Carolina	5–2	38–12	17–8
51	May 10	at NC State	Doak Field • Raleigh, North Carolina	4–9	38–13	17–9
52	May 12	at Charlotte	Robert and Mariam Hayes Stadium • Charlotte, North Carolina	4–1	39–13	17–9
53	May 14	at Boston College	Eddie Pellagrini Diamond • Chestnut Hill, Massachusetts	1–3	39–14	17–10
54	May 15	at Boston College	Eddie Pellagrini Diamond • Chestnut Hill, Massachusetts	16–10	40–14	18–10
55	May 16	at Boston College	Eddie Pellagrini Diamond • Chestnut Hill, Massachusetts	8–1	41–14	19–10

Postseason
ACC Tournament (1–2)

#	Date	Opponent	Site/stadium	Score	Overall record	ACC record
56	vs May 20	vs Duke	Durham Bulls Athletic Park • Durham, North Carolina	8–3	42–14	19–10
57	vs May 22	vs Virginia	Durham Bulls Athletic Park • Durham, North Carolina	1–11	42–15	19–10
58	vs May 23	vs Florida State	Durham Bulls Athletic Park • Durham, North Carolina	3–4	42–16	19–10

NCAA Chapel Hill Regional (3–0)

#	Date	Opponent	Site/stadium	Score	Overall record	ACC record
59	vs May 29	Dartmouth	Boshamer Stadium • Chapel Hill, North Carolina	5–2	43–16	19–10
60	vs May 30	Coastal Carolina	Boshamer Stadium • Chapel Hill, North Carolina	14–5	44–16	19–10
61	vs May 31	Kansas	Boshamer Stadium • Chapel Hill, North Carolina	7–3	45–16	19–10

NCAA Cary Super Regional (2–0)

#	Date	Opponent	Site/stadium	Score	Overall record	ACC record
62	vs June 6	East Carolina	Boshamer Stadium • Chapel Hill, North Carolina	10–1	46–16	19–10
63	vs June 7	East Carolina	Boshamer Stadium • Chapel Hill, North Carolina	9–3	47–16	19–10

College World Series (1–2)

#	Date	Opponent	Site/stadium	Score	Overall record	ACC record
64	June 14	vs Arizona State	Johnny Rosenblatt Stadium • Omaha, Nebraska	2–5	47–17	19–10
65	June 16	vs Southern Miss	Johnny Rosenblatt Stadium • Omaha, Nebraska	11–4	48–17	19–10
66	June 18	vs LSU	Johnny Rosenblatt Stadium • Omaha, Nebraska	5–12	48–18	19–10

== Awards and honors ==
Dustin Ackley

- First Team All-American American Baseball Coaches Association
- First Team All-American Baseball America
- First Team All-American Collegiate Baseball Newspaper
- First Team All-American National Collegiate Baseball Writers Association
- First Team All-Atlantic Region American Baseball Coaches Association
- National Player of the Year Rivals.com
- First Team All-ACC
- Atlantic Coast Conference Player of the Year
- College World Series All-Tournament Team

Levi Michael

- Freshman All-American Collegiate Baseball Newspaper
- Second Team Freshman All-American National Collegiate Baseball Writers Association

Brian Moran

- Third Team All-American Baseball America
- Second Team All-ACC

Kyle Seager

- First Team All-ACC
- College World Series All-Tournament Team

Adam Warren

- Second Team All-ACC

Alex White

- First Team All-ACC
- Second Team All-Atlantic Region American Baseball Coaches Association
