= Jack Leggett =

American baseball coach (born 1954)

Biographical details
- Born: March 5, 1954 (age 72); Bangor, Maine, U.S.

Coaching career (HC unless noted)
- 1978–1982: Vermont
- 1983–1991: Western Carolina
- 1992–1993: Clemson (assistant)
- 1994–2015: Clemson
- 2023–present: Clemson (assistant)

Head coaching record
- Overall: 1,332–770–1 (.634)

Accomplishments and honors

Championships
- 1985 Southern Conference; 1986 Southern Conference; 1987 Southern Conference; 1988 Southern Conference; 1989 Southern Conference; 1994 Atlantic Coast Conference; 2006 Atlantic Coast Conference

Awards
- 1994 ACC Coach-of-the-Year; 1995 ACC Coach-of-the-Year; 2006 ACC Coach-of-the-Year

Jack Leggett (born March 5, 1954) is an American college baseball coach. He was recently the head coach of the Clemson Tigers from 1994 to 2015. Under Leggett, the Tigers reached the College World Series six times. As of the end of the 2012 season, he had a career record of 1,224–694–1, with seven conference tournament titles and 23 NCAA tournament appearances. Currently, he operates as an associate for Erik Bakich’s staff at Clemson University.

He was named Atlantic Coast Conference Baseball Coach of the year in 1994, 1995 and 2006. In 1994, his team won 57 games, a record for the second most single-season wins in ACC history (behind the record 60 wins set by the 1991 Clemson team).

== Coaching career ==
Leggett served as head coach for five years at Vermont and nine years at Western Carolina. He became the head coach at Vermont prior to the 1978 season. After coaching the Vermont club baseball team in 1977, Leggett had brought the program back to varsity status, after it had been cut following the 1971 season. He set a program record for wins (22) in 1981, and Vermont appeared in consecutive ECAC New England Division I Tournaments in 1981 and 1982. In 1981, Leggett managed the Falmouth Commodores, a collegiate summer baseball team in the prestigious Cape Cod Baseball League.

At Western Carolina, he had 302 career wins and led the Catamounts to five NCAA tournaments (1985–89), and five Southern Conference titles. Under his guidance, the Catamounts averaged 33 wins a season during his time in Cullowhee, N.C. He is the only person to be the head coach at both NCAA Division I schools nicknamed the Catamounts (Vermont and Western Carolina).

Leggett was inducted into the Western Carolina University Athletic Hall of Fame in 2001 and the Vermont Principals Association Hall of Fame in 2009. In 2014, Leggett was inducted into the American Baseball Coaches Association Hall of Fame. Leggett was a member of the 2015 class of the Vermont Sports Hall of Fame.

The son of former University of Vermont swim coach Les Leggett, he grew up in South Burlington, Vermont and was a three-sport athlete at South Burlington High School, winning state titles in baseball and football. He attended the University of Maine where he earned all-conference honors in both football (defensive back, kicker) and baseball (infielder), captaining the Black Bears in 1976 when they advanced to the College World Series. In football, he holds the Maine record for longest field goal, a 52-yarder.

== Head coaching record ==
Record table
Season	Team	Overall	Conference	Standing	Postseason
Vermont Catamounts (Eastern College Athletic Conference) (1978–1982)
1978	Vermont	11–9			
1979	Vermont	12–11			
1980	Vermont	12–16			
1981	Vermont	22–15			ECAC Tournament
1982	Vermont	18–10			ECAC Tournament
Vermont:		75–61			
Western Carolina Catamounts (Southern Conference) (1983–1991)
1983	Western Carolina	25–20	9–5	3rd	
1984	Western Carolina	37–20	13–3	1st (South)	SoCon tournament
1985	Western Carolina	37–35	11–6	2nd (South)	NCAA Regional
1986	Western Carolina	33–28	12–5	1st (South)	NCAA Regional
1987	Western Carolina	36–20	13–3	1st (South)	NCAA Regional
1988	Western Carolina	38–24	14–3	1st (South)	NCAA Regional
1989	Western Carolina	23–31	10–5	1st	NCAA Regional
1990	Western Carolina	37–25	10–7	T–2nd	SoCon tournament
1991	Western Carolina	36–26	11–3	2nd	SoCon tournament
Western Carolina:		302–229	103–40		
Clemson Tigers (Atlantic Coast Conference) (1994–present)
1994	Clemson	57–18	20–4	1st	NCAA Regional
1995	Clemson	54–14	20–4	1st	College World Series
1996	Clemson	51–17	17–7	2nd	College World Series
1997	Clemson	41–23	13–10	4th	NCAA Regional
1998	Clemson	43–16	14–9	T–2nd	NCAA Regional
1999	Clemson	42–27	13–10	4th	NCAA Super Regional
2000	Clemson	51–18	17–7	2nd	College World Series
2001	Clemson	41–22	17–7	2nd	NCAA Super Regional
2002	Clemson	54–17	16–8	4th	College World Series
2003	Clemson	39–22	15–9	T–3rd	NCAA Regional
2004	Clemson	39–26	14–10	T–4th	NCAA Regional
2005	Clemson	43–23	21–9	2nd	NCAA Super Regional
2006	Clemson	53–16	24–6	1st (Atlantic)	College World Series
2007	Clemson	41–23	18–12	2nd (Atlantic)	NCAA Super Regional
2008	Clemson	31–27–1	11–18–1	4th (Atlantic)	
2009	Clemson	44–22	19–11	2nd (Atlantic)	NCAA Super Regional
2010	Clemson	45–25	18–12	T–1st (Atlantic)	College World Series
2011	Clemson	43–20	17–13	2nd (Atlantic)	NCAA Regional
2012	Clemson	35–28	16–14	3rd (Atlantic)	NCAA Regional
2013	Clemson	40–22	18–12	3rd (Atlantic)	NCAA Regional
2014	Clemson	36–25	15–14	T–2nd (Atlantic)	NCAA Regional
2015	Clemson	32–29	16–13	T–3rd (Atlantic)	NCAA Regional
Clemson:		955–480–1	369–219–1		
Total:		1,332–770–1			
National champion Postseason invitational champion Conference regular season champion Conference regular season and conference tournament champion Division regular season champion Division regular season and conference tournament champion Conference tournament champion

== See also ==
- List of college baseball career coaching wins leaders
- List of current NCAA Division I baseball coaches
