= 2009 Clemson Tigers baseball team =

American college baseball season

2009 Clemson Tigers baseball

Clemson, SC Regional Champions

Tempe, AZ Super Regional, (L 4–7, L 2–8)
- Conference: Atlantic Coast Conference
- Atlantic
- Record: 44–22 (19–11 ACC)
- Head coach: Jack Leggett
- Home stadium: Doug Kingsmore Stadium

2009 Atlantic Coast Conference baseball standings
	Conf.				Overall
Team	W		L	PCT	W		L	PCT
Atlantic
No. 10 Florida State ^{x}‍‍‍^{y}	19	–	9	.679	45	–	18	.714
No. 15 Clemson ‍‍‍^{y}	19	–	11	.633	44	–	22	.667
Boston College ‍‍‍^{y}	13	–	15	.464	34	–	26	.567
Maryland ‍‍‍	10	–	20	.333	27	–	27	.500
NC State ‍‍‍	10	–	20	.333	25	–	31	.446
Wake Forest ‍‍‍	6	–	24	.200	22	–	30	.423
Coastal
No. 5 North Carolina ^{x}‍‍‍^{y}	19	–	10	.655	48	–	18	.727
No. 18 Georgia Tech ‍‍‍^{y}	17	–	10	.630	38	–	19	.667
No. 20 Miami ‍‍‍^{y}	18	–	12	.600	38	–	22	.633
No. 6 Virginia ‍‍‡‍^{y}	16	–	11	.593	49	–	15	.766
Duke ‍‍‍	15	–	15	.500	35	–	24	.593
Virginia Tech ‍‍‍	12	–	17	.414	32	–	21	.604
x – Division champion ‡ – Tournament champion y – Invited to the NCAA tournament As of June 30, 2009; Rankings from Collegiate Baseball

The 2009 Clemson Tigers baseball team represented Clemson University in the 2009 NCAA Division I baseball season. The team played their home games at Doug Kingsmore Stadium in Clemson, SC.

The team was coached by Jack Leggett in his sixteenth season at Clemson.

== Preseason ==
On January 27, 2009, the coaches in the ACC picked Clemson to finish second in the Atlantic Division behind Florida State. Overall, the Tigers were picked third behind North Carolina and Florida State respectively.

== Regular season ==
On March 5, 2009, Head Coach Jack Leggett announced that Fifth-year shortstop Stan Widmann had left the team for personal reasons. Widmann, who graduated from Clemson with a degree in sport management the previous December, had withdrawn from school to pursue job opportunities.

On Wednesday, March 18, pitchers Justin Sarratt, Scott Weismann, Kyle Deese, Tomas Cruz, and Matt Vaughn combined to pitch a no-hitter in Clemson's 14–0 victory over USC Upstate at Doug Kingsmore Stadium. It was the Tigers' 14th no-hitter in school history and first since the second game of a doubleheader on March 6, 1984, when Scott Parrish no-hit The Citadel in a seven-inning game. It was also just the second no-hitter involving multiple pitchers in Tiger history.

On Tuesday, April 21, sophomore outfielder Jeff Shaus hit a walk-off grand slam to lift the Tigers to a 5–3 victory over the visiting Coastal Carolina Chanticleers. It was Clemson's first walk-off home run since April 27, 2007, when Doug Hogan hit a walk-off solo homer to top Georgia Tech 3–2 in 11 innings. It was also the second walk-off grand slam in Tiger history, matching the walk-off grand slam hit by Tyler Colvin in the Tigers' 11–8 win over Oral Roberts in the 2006 Clemson Super Regional.

== Postseason ==
=== ACC tournament ===
Clemson went 1–2 in the 2009 ACC baseball tournament with losses to 7-seeded Duke and eventual champs, 6-seeded Virginia. On May 23, in their final game of the tournament, Clemson beat 2-seeded and top-five nationally ranked North Carolina in eleven innings in front of a crowd of 6,956. This set a record for the highest attendance ever at a college baseball game in the state of North Carolina.

=== NCAA tournament ===
Clemson was awarded a host site for the regional round of the 2009 NCAA Division I baseball tournament. After beating 4-seeded Tennessee Tech in their first game of the regional, the Tigers would lose their next game to the 3-seeded Oklahoma State Cowboys. Clemson then proceeded to win their next three games to advance out of the loser's bracket and on to the Super Regional round of the tournament. With the win, Jack Leggett extended his streak to 11–0 in home games that clinch a regional or super regional championship.

In the Super Regionals, Clemson traveled to Tempe, Arizona to take on the number five national seed Arizona State. The Sun Devils defeated Clemson in the first two games of the best-of-three series, earning a trip to the College World Series in Omaha, Nebraska. The losses ended Clemson's season with a record of 44 wins and 22 losses.

=== Coaching staff ===
Name	Title	First season at CU	Alma mater
Jack Leggett	Head Coach	1994	Maine (1976)
Tom Riginos	Associate head coach	2003	Stetson (1990)
Kyle Bunn	Assistant Head Coach	2008	The Citadel (2000)
Toby Bicknell	Volunteer Assistant Coach	2007	Wingate (2002)

== Schedule/Results ==
2008 Clemson Tigers baseball Game Log
Regular season

Date	Opponent^{#}	Rank^{#}	Location	Win	Loss	Save	Attend	Result	Record (ACC)
Feb. 20*	Charlotte	#25	Doug Kingsmore Stadium • Clemson, SC	Delk (1–0)	Yermal (0–1)		4,968	W 8–3	1–0
Feb. 21*	Charlotte	#25	Doug Kingsmore Stadium • Clemson, SC	Dwyer (1–0)	Smith (0–1)		5,681	W 4–0	2–0
Feb. 22*	Charlotte	#25	Doug Kingsmore Stadium • Clemson, SC	Hinson (1–0)	Pierce (0–1)		3,730	W 6–5^{10}	3–0
Feb. 25*	Wofford	#25	Doug Kingsmore Stadium • Clemson, SC	Harman (1–0)	Rowland (0–1)		3,609	W 8–2	4–0
Feb. 28*	South Carolina	#25	Doug Kingsmore Stadium • Clemson, SC (Carolina–Clemson rivalry)	Farotto (1–0)	Stoneburner (0–1)		4,917	L 1–3	4–1
Mar. 1*	@ South Carolina	#25	Carolina Stadium • Columbia, SC (Carolina–Clemson rivalry)	Postponed (rain), Rescheduled for April 7th					
Mar. 3*	Furman	#21	Doug Kingsmore Stadium • Clemson, SC	DeDecker (2–0)	Cruz (0–1)	Gottlieb (1)	3,255	L 2–4^{14}	4–2
Mar. 4*	UNC-Asheville	#21	Doug Kingsmore Stadium • Clemson, SC	Sarratt (1–0)	Wohlwend (1–3)		3,338	W 17–2	5–2
Mar. 6	@ No. 2 North Carolina	#21	Boshamer Stadium • Chapel Hill, NC	Cruz (1–1)	Moran (0–1)		2,211	W 5–4^{10}	6–2 (1–0)
Mar. 7	@ No. 2 North Carolina	#21	Boshamer Stadium • Chapel Hill, NC	Warren (2–0)	Stoneburner (0–2)	Bates (1)	4,100	L 2–5	6–3 (1–1)
Mar. 8	@ No. 2 North Carolina	#21	Boshamer Stadium • Chapel Hill, NC	Bates (1–1)	Harman (1–1)		2,625	L 8–9	6–4 (1–2)
Mar. 10*	Michigan State	#24	Doug Kingsmore Stadium • Clemson, SC	Sarratt (2–0)	Wunderlich (0–2)		4,246	W 15–2	7–4
Mar. 11*	vs. Michigan State	#24	Fluor Field at the West End • Greenville, SC (Greenville Drive College Baseball Series)	Stoneburner (1–2)	Corcoran (0–1)		5,058	W 6–1	8–4
Mar. 13	Wake Forest	#24	Doug Kingsmore Stadium • Clemson, SC	Cruz (2–1)	Kledzik (1–3)	Lamb (1)	3,292	W 4–1	9–4 (2–2)
Mar. 13	Wake Forest	#24	Doug Kingsmore Stadium • Clemson, SC	Harman (2–1)	Stadler (2–2)		3,292	W 6–1	10–4 (3–2)
Mar. 15	Wake Forest	#24	Doug Kingsmore Stadium • Clemson, SC	Dwyer (2–0)	Negus (1–1)		3,475	W 7–3	11–4 (4–2)
Mar. 17*	Presbyterian	#19	Doug Kingsmore Stadium • Clemson, SC	Stoneburner (2–2)	Freeman (0–1)		4,081	W 8–0	12–4
Mar. 18*	USC-Upstate	#19	Doug Kingsmore Stadium • Clemson, SC	Sarratt (3–0)	Moyer (1–4)		4,020	W 14–0	13–4
Mar. 20	@ No. 24 Florida State	#19	Dick Howser Stadium • Tallahassee, FL	Gilmartin (4–1)	Delk (1–1)	Marshall (4)	5,195	L 2–5	13–5 (4–3)
Mar. 21	@ No. 24 Florida State	#19	Dick Howser Stadium • Tallahassee, FL	Vaughn (1–0)	Gast (1–2)	Harman (1)	5,790	W 8–7^{11}	14–5 (5–3)
Mar. 22	@ No. 24 Florida State	#19	Dick Howser Stadium • Tallahassee, FL	Gast (2–2)	Sarratt (3–1)		5,125	L 4–7	14–6 (5–4)
Mar. 24*	Elon	#20	Doug Kingsmore Stadium • Clemson, SC	McKinney (1–0)	Harrilchak (0–1)	Vaughn (1)	4,469	W 5–3	15–6
Mar. 24*	Elon	#20	Doug Kingsmore Stadium • Clemson, SC	Gullickson (1–0)	Porter (0–1)	Cruz (1)	4,469	W 8–7	16–6
Mar. 27	@ Boston College	#20	Eddie Pellagrini Diamond at John Shea Field • Chestnut Hill, MA	MacDonald (3–2)	Dwyer (2–1)		712	L 1–13	16–7 (5–5)
Mar. 28	@ Boston College	#20	Shea Field • Chestnut Hill, MA	Harman (3–1)	Leonard (1–1)	Cruz (2)	1,210	W 7–6	17–7 (6–5)
Mar. 28	@ Boston College	#20	Shea Field • Chestnut Hill, MA	Stoneburner (3–2)	Moran (2–1)	Vaughn (2)	1,210	W 5–3	18–7 (7–5)
Mar. 31*	@ No. 1 Georgia	#17	Foley Field • Athens, GA	Leaver (3–0)	Dwyer (2–2)	Weaver (5)	3,045	L 5–6	18–8
Apr. 1*	No. 1 Georgia	#17	Doug Kingsmore Stadium • Clemson, SC	Harvil (2–0)	Vaughn (1–1)		5,239	L 2–4	18–9
Apr. 3	Duke	#17	Doug Kingsmore Stadium • Clemson, SC	McKinney (2–0)	Manno (2–4)		4,988	W 7–3	19–9 (8–5)
Apr. 4	Duke	#17	Doug Kingsmore Stadium • Clemson, SC	Wolcott (5–1)	Stoneburner (3–3)	Hassan (8)	5,162	L 7–10	19–10 (8–6)
Apr. 5	Duke	#17	Doug Kingsmore Stadium • Clemson, SC	Dwyer (3–2)	Knott (2–1)		4,753	W 10–1	20–10 (9–6)
Apr. 7*	@ South Carolina	#20	Carolina Stadium • Columbia, SC (Carolina–Clemson rivalry)	Johnson (2–0)	Harman (3–2)		8,078	L 6–7	20–11
Apr. 8*	South Carolina	#20	Doug Kingsmore Stadium • Clemson, SC (Carolina–Clemson rivalry)	Vaughn (2–1)	Casey (0–1)	Stoneburner (1)	5,865	W 7–5	21–11
Apr. 11	No. 5 Miami	#20	Doug Kingsmore Stadium • Clemson, SC	Hernandez (4–2)	Harman (3–3)		6,217	L 8–12	21–12 (9–7)
Apr. 11	No. 5 Miami	#20	Doug Kingsmore Stadium • Clemson, SC	Dwyer (4–2)	Gutierrez (2–4)		6,217	W 9–1	22–12 (10–7)
Apr. 12	No. 5 Miami	#20	Doug Kingsmore Stadium • Clemson, SC	Stoneburner (4–3)	Nazario (4–1)	Cruz (3)	4,696	W 9–6	23–12 (11–7)
Apr. 14*	@ Western Carolina	#18	Hennon Stadium • Cullowhee, NC	Stoneburner (5–3)	Ozar (2–3)		1,249	W 11–1	24–12
Apr. 15*	Western Carolina	#18	Doug Kingsmore Stadium • Clemson, SC	Frederick (1–0)	Stewart (3–1)		4,721	W 13–2	25–12
Apr. 17	@ Virginia Tech	#18	English Field • Blacksburg, VA	Ballard (5–2)	Dwyer (4–3)	McDermott (1)	1,097	L 2–5	25–13 (11–8)
Apr. 18	@ Virginia Tech	#18	English Field • Blacksburg, VA	Wright (4–1)	Sarratt (3–2)		2,672	L 3–7	25–14 (11–9)
Apr. 19	@ Virginia Tech	#18	English Field • Blacksburg, VA	Harman (4–3)	Price (3–2)		509	W 8–1	26–14 (12–9)
Apr. 21*	No. 19 Coastal Carolina	#20	Doug Kingsmore Stadium • Clemson, SC	McKinney (3–0)	McCully (3–1)		3,860	W 5–3	27–14
Apr. 22*	@ South Carolina	#20	Carolina Stadium • Columbia, SC (Carolina–Clemson rivalry)	Vaughn (3–1)	Westmoreland (3–2)		8,212	W 12–2	28–14
Apr. 24	No. 7 Georgia Tech	#20	Doug Kingsmore Stadium • Clemson, SC	McGuire (7–0)	Dwyer (4–4)	Brewster (1)	5,584	L 4–5	28–15 (12–10)
Apr. 25	No. 7 Georgia Tech	#20	Doug Kingsmore Stadium • Clemson, SC	Harman (5–3)	Von Tersch (6–2)		6,109	W 8–5	29–15 (13–10)
Apr. 26	No. 7 Georgia Tech	#20	Doug Kingsmore Stadium • Clemson, SC	Delk (2–1)	Cumpton (2–1)	Weismann (1)	5,164	W 6–3	30–15 (14–10)
May 2	Maryland	#17	Doug Kingsmore Stadium • Clemson, SC	Hinson (2–0)	Swinson (2–7)		4,847	W 11–2	31–15 (15–10)
May 3	Maryland	#17	Doug Kingsmore Stadium • Clemson, SC	Weismann (1–0)	Harman (3–5)	Vaughn (3)	5,792	W 7–4	32–15 (16–10)
May 3	Maryland	#17	Doug Kingsmore Stadium • Clemson, SC	Blackwell (2–0)	Cruz (2–2)	Gentzler (6)	5,792	L 6–8	32–16 (16–11)
May 6*	vs. Furman	#19	Fluor Field at the West End • Greenville, SC (Greenville Drive College Baseball Series)	Postponed (rain), Rescheduled for May 11th					
May 8*	UNC-Wilmington	#19	Doug Kingsmore Stadium • Clemson, SC	Delk (3–1)	Frankoff (2–5)		4,516	W 13–2	33–16
May 9*	UNC-Wilmington	#19	Doug Kingsmore Stadium • Clemson, SC	Harman (6–3)	Roth (0–2)		4,885	W 11–3	34–16
May 10*	UNC-Wilmington	#19	Doug Kingsmore Stadium • Clemson, SC	Harrold (3–1)	Cruz (2–3)	Booth (3)	4,408	L 3–4	34–17
May 11*	vs. Furman	#14	Fluor Field at the West End • Greenville, SC (Greenville Drive College Baseball Series)	Haselden (1–0)	Goldsberry (3–5)	Sarratt (1)	4,324	W 8–5	35–17
May 12*	College of Charleston	#14	Doug Kingsmore Stadium • Clemson, SC	Weismann (2–0)	Lucchese (1–2)	Vaughn (4)	4,597	W 5–2	36–17
May 14	@ NC State	#14	Doak Field • Raleigh, NC	Delk (4–1)	Gillheeney (6–5)		804	W 15–8	37–17 (17–11)
May 15	@ NC State	#14	Doak Field • Raleigh, NC	Harman (7–3)	Lambert (1–5)		1,245	W 11–5	38–17 (18–11)
May 16	@ NC State	#14	Doak Field • Raleigh, NC	McKinney (4–0)	Buchanan (2–6)	Cruz (4)	1,149	W 5–4	39–17 (19–11)
*Non-Conference Game. ^{#}Rankings from ESPN/USA Today Coaches Poll.^{1}Note that rankings above 25 are not official rankings. They are representations of ranking based on the number of points received in the weekly poll.

2009 ACC Baseball Tournament

Date	Opponent^{#}	Seed	Location	Win	Loss	Save	Attend	Result	Record (ACC)
May 21	vs. No. 6 Virginia	#3	Durham Bulls Athletic Park • Durham, NC	Carraway (6–1)	Weismann (2–1)	Arico (9)	1,639	L 5–6	39–18 (0–1)
May 22	vs. No. 7 Duke	#3	Durham Bulls Athletic Park • Durham, NC	Wolcott (8–3)	Dwyer (4–5)		2,763	L 4–10	39–19 (0–2)
May 23	vs. No. 2 North Carolina	#3	Durham Bulls Athletic Park • Durham, NC	Stoneburner (6–3)	Johnson (2–2)		6,956	W 4–3^{11}	40–19 (1–2)
^{#}Rankings indicate tournament seeds

2009 NCAA Division I baseball tournament – Clemson, SC Regional

Date	Opponent^{#}	Seed	Location	Win	Loss	Save	Attend	Result	Record (NCAA)
May 29	No. 4 Tennessee Tech	#1	Doug Kingsmore Stadium • Clemson, SC	Stoneburner (7–3)	L. Henry (9–3)		5,720	W 5–4	41–19 (1–0)
May 30	No. 3 Oklahoma State	#1	Doug Kingsmore Stadium • Clemson, SC	McCurry (4–1)	Hinson (2–1)		5,740	L 2–3	41–20 (1–1)
May 31	No. 4 Tennessee Tech	#1	Doug Kingsmore Stadium • Clemson, SC	Weismann (3–1)	Choate (1–2)		3,628	W 10–0	42–20 (2–1)
May 31	No. 3 Oklahoma State	#1	Doug Kingsmore Stadium • Clemson, SC	Dywer (5–5)	Blanford (7–4)		4,367	W 15–1	43–20 (3–1)
June 1	No. 3 Oklahoma State	#1	Doug Kingsmore Stadium • Clemson, SC	Vaughn (4–1)	Lyons (7–6)		6,217	W 6–5	44–20 (4–1)
^{#}Rankings indicate regional seeds

2009 NCAA Division I baseball tournament – Tempe, AZ Super Regional

Date	Opponent^{#}	Seed	Location	Win	Loss	Save	Attend	Result	Record (NCAA)
June 6	No. 5 Arizona State		Packard Stadium • Tempe, AZ	Leake (16–1)	Stoneburner (7–4)	Lambson (5)	4,381	L 4–7	44–21 (4–2)
June 7	No. 5 Arizona State		Packard Stadium • Tempe, AZ	Spence (9–1)	Dwyer (5–6)		4,406	L 2–8	44–22 (4–3)
^{#}Rankings indicate national seeds

== Awards and honors ==
Wilson Boyd

- ACC All-Tournament Team
- Clemson Regional All-Tournament Team

Chris Dwyer

- ACC Pitcher of the Week, April 13
- Clemson Regional All-Tournament Team

Chris Epps

- Clemson Regional All-Tournament Team
- Clemson Regional MVP

Mike Freeman

- Clemson Regional All-Tournament Team

Casey Harman

- ACC All-Tournament Team

Kyle Parker

- Preseason Brooks Wallace Award Watch List
- ACC Player of the Week, April 13

Ben Paulsen

- Preseason Brooks Wallace Award Watch List
- Baseball America Preseason Third-Team All-American
- Clemson Regional All-Tournament Team

Jeff Schaus

- ACC Co-Player of the Week, April 27
- First Team, All-ACC

Matt Vaughn

- NCBWA Stopper of the Year Award Watch List

== Rankings ==
Ranking Movement	Week															
Poll	Pre	1	2	3	4	5	6	7	8	9	10	11	12	13	14	Final
USA Today/ESPN Coaches	25^{1}		21	24	19	20	17	20	18	20	17	19	14	13	14	
Baseball America	19	19	19	22	20	NR	NR	NR	NR	NR	21	20	19	13	16	
Collegiate Baseball	26	25	19	NR	18	22	22	NR	21	26	19	19	17	13	15	
NCBWA	26	19	18	21	16	20	18	22	18	21	19	20	16	15	16	
Rivals.com	20	15	17	22	19	NR	NR	NR	22	NR	22	21	21	16	17	

^{1- USA Today / ESPN did not release a poll after the first weekend of play.}

== Major League Baseball draft ==
Player	Year	Round	Pick	Team
Ben Paulsen	Jr.			
