= 2009 Virginia Cavaliers baseball team =

American college baseball season

2009 Virginia Cavaliers baseball

ACC Tournament champions Irvine Regional champions Oxford Super Regional champions
- Conference: Atlantic Coast Conference
- Record: 49–15-1 (22–8 ACC)
- Head coach: Brian O'Connor (6th season)
- Assistant coaches: Kevin McMullan (6th season); Karl Kuhn (6th season)
- Home stadium: Davenport Field

2009 Atlantic Coast Conference baseball standings
| | Conf. | | | | Overall |
| Team | W | | L | PCT | W | | L | PCT |
|---|---|---|---|---|---|---|---|---|
Atlantic
| No. 10 Florida State ^{x}‍‍‍^{y} | 19 | – | 9 | .679 | 45 | – | 18 | .714 |
| No. 15 Clemson ‍‍‍^{y} | 19 | – | 11 | .633 | 44 | – | 22 | .667 |
| Boston College ‍‍‍^{y} | 13 | – | 15 | .464 | 34 | – | 26 | .567 |
| Maryland ‍‍‍ | 10 | – | 20 | .333 | 27 | – | 27 | .500 |
| NC State ‍‍‍ | 10 | – | 20 | .333 | 25 | – | 31 | .446 |
| Wake Forest ‍‍‍ | 6 | – | 24 | .200 | 22 | – | 30 | .423 |
Coastal
| No. 5 North Carolina ^{x}‍‍‍^{y} | 19 | – | 10 | .655 | 48 | – | 18 | .727 |
| No. 18 Georgia Tech ‍‍‍^{y} | 17 | – | 10 | .630 | 38 | – | 19 | .667 |
| No. 20 Miami ‍‍‍^{y} | 18 | – | 12 | .600 | 38 | – | 22 | .633 |
| No. 6 Virginia ‍‍‡‍^{y} | 16 | – | 11 | .593 | 49 | – | 15 | .766 |
| Duke ‍‍‍ | 15 | – | 15 | .500 | 35 | – | 24 | .593 |
| Virginia Tech ‍‍‍ | 12 | – | 17 | .414 | 32 | – | 21 | .604 |
x – Division champion ‡ – Tournament champion y – Invited to the NCAA tournament As of June 30, 2009; Rankings from Collegiate Baseball

2009 Virginia Cavaliers baseball team represented the University of Virginia in the 2009 NCAA Division I baseball season. The Cavaliers played their home games at Davenport Field. The team was coached by Brian O'Connor, leading his sixth season at Virginia.

The Cavaliers won the 2009 Atlantic Coast Conference baseball tournament, then advanced to the 2009 College World Series.

== Personnel ==
=== Roster ===
2009 Virginia Cavaliers roster
| Pitchers: 11 - Kevin Arico; 12 - Corey Hunt; 15 - Matt Packer; 17 - Shane Halley; 18 - Tyler Wilson; 20 - Sean Lucas; 22 - Robert Morey; 23 - Danny Hultzen; 25 - Will Roberts; 29 - Scott Silverstein; 30 - Blake Forslund; 31 - Justin Thompson; 34 - Robert Poutier; 37 - Brad Grove; 38 - Andrew Carraway; 39 - Neal Davis; 47 - Jeff Lorick | Infielders: 2 - Keith Werman; 5 - Phil Gosselin; 12 - Corey Hunt; 13 - Jared King; 19 - Steven Proscia; 27 - Tyler Biddix; Catchers: 8 - John Hicks; 10 - Tyler Cannon; 33 - Franco Valdes; 45 - Will Campbell | Outfielders: 3 - Jarrett Parker; 7 - John Barr; 9 - David Coleman; 14 - John Bivens; 21 - Dan Grovatt; 27 - Tyler Biddix; 35 - Steven Kouril |

=== Coaches ===
2009 Virginia Cavaliers baseball coaching staff
- Brian O'Connor – Head coach – 6th year
- Kevin McMullan - Associate head coach - 6th year
- Karl Kuhn - Assistant coach - 6th year
- Eddie Smith - Assistant coach - 3rd year

== Schedule ==
2009 Virginia Cavaliers baseball game log
Regular season

February
| Date | Opponent | Site/stadium | Score | Win | Loss | Save | Attendance | Overall record | ACC record |
|---|---|---|---|---|---|---|---|---|---|
| February 20 | Bucknell | Davenport Field • Charlottesville, VA | 12–0 | | | | | 1–0 | |
| February 21 | Bucknell | Davenport Field • Charlottesville, VA | 7–0 | | | | | 2–0 | |
| February 21 | Bucknell | Davenport Field • Charlottesville, VA | 6–1 | | | | | 3–0 | |
| February 22 | Bucknell | Davenport Field • Charlottesville, VA | 11–1 | | | | | 4–0 | |
| February 24 | William & Mary | Davenport Field • Charlottesville, VA | 11–1 | | | | | 5–0 | |
| February 27 | Fordham | Davenport Field • Charlottesville, VA | 6–2 | | | | | 5–0 | |
| February 27 | Delaware | Davenport Field • Charlottesville, VA | 11–4 | | | | | 6–0 | |
| February 28 | Delaware | Davenport Field • Charlottesville, VA | 7–3 | | | | | 7–0 | |

March
| Date | Opponent | Site/stadium | Score | Win | Loss | Save | Attendance | Overall record | ACC record |
|---|---|---|---|---|---|---|---|---|---|
| March 4 | George Washington | Davenport Field • Charlottesville, VA | 17–4 | | | | | 8–0 | |
| March 6 | @ Wake Forest | Gene Hooks Field at Wake Forest Baseball Park • Winston-Salem, NC | 18–2 | | | | | 9–0 | 1-0 |
| March 7 | @ Wake Forest | Gene Hooks Field at Wake Forest Baseball Park •Winston-Salem, NC | 8–6 | | | | | 10–0 | 2-0 |
| March 8 | @ Wake Forest | Gene Hooks Field at Wake Forest Baseball Park •Winston-Salem, NC | 21–5 | | | | | 11–0 | 3-0 |
| March 10 | Navy | Davenport Field • Charlottesville, VA | 17–1 | | | | | 12–0 | |
| March 11 | VMI | Davenport Field • Charlottesville, VA | 10–3 | | | | | 12–0 | |
| Mar 13 | Florida State | Davenport Field • Charlottesville, VA | 15–2 | | | | | 13–0 | 4–0 |
| Mar 17 | Marshall | Davenport Field • Charlottesville, VA | 5–4 | | | | | 14–0 | |
| March 18 | Canisius | Davenport Field • Charlottesville, VA | 11–3 | | | | | 15–0 | |
| March 18 | Wagner | Davenport Field • Charlottesville, VA | 5–2 | | | | | 16–0 | |
| March 20 | Miami (FL) | Davenport Field • Charlottesville, VA | 9–4 | | | | | 17–0 | 5-0 |
| March 21 | Miami (FL) | Davenport Field • Charlottesville, VA | 3–4 | | | | | 17–1 | 5-1 |
| March 22 | Miami (FL) | Davenport Field • Charlottesville, VA | 5-7(8) | | | | | 17–2 | 5-2 |
| March 24 | Towson | Davenport Field • Charlottesville, VA | 13–4 | | | | | 18–2 | |
| March 25 | Towson | Davenport Field • Charlottesville, VA | 7–5 | | | | | 19–2 | |
| March 27 | @ North Carolina | Boshamer Stadium • Chapel Hill, NC | 3–4 | | | | | 19–3 | 5-3 |
| March 28 | @ North Carolina | Boshamer Stadium • Chapel Hill, NC | 5–2 | | | | | 20–3 | 6-3 |
| March 29 | @ North Carolina | Boshamer Stadium • Chapel Hill, NC | 5–6 | | | | | 20–4 | 6-4 |
| March 31 | Radford | Davenport Field • Charlottesville, VA | 12–2 | | | | | 21–4 | |

April
| Date | Opponent | Site/stadium | Score | Win | Loss | Save | Attendance | Overall record | ACC record |
|---|---|---|---|---|---|---|---|---|---|
| April 1 | Norfolk State | Davenport Field • Charlottesville, VA | 6–2 | | | | | 22–4 | |
| April 3 | Maryland | Davenport Field • Charlottesville, VA | 7–4 | | | | | 23–4 | 7–4 |
| April 4 | Maryland | Davenport Field • Charlottesville, VA | 7–8 | | | | | 23–5 | 7–5 |
| April 5 | Maryland | Davenport Field • Charlottesville, VA | 17–2 | | | | | 24–5 | 8–5 |
| April 7 | Stony Brook | Davenport Field • Charlottesville, VA | 8–0 | | | | | 25–5 | |
| April 8 | Stony Brook | Davenport Field • Charlottesville, VA | 2–6 | | | | | 25–6 | |
| April 11 | @ Georgia Tech | Russ Chandler Stadium • Atlanta, GA | 6–7 | | | | | 25-7 | 8-6 |
| April 11 | @ Georgia Tech | Russ Chandler Stadium • Atlanta, GA | 11–10 | | | | | 26-7 | 9-6 |
| April 12 | @ Georgia Tech | Russ Chandler Stadium • Atlanta, GA | 4–4 | | | | | 26-7-1 | 9-6-1 |
| April 17 | @ Boston College | Shea Field • Chestnut Hill, MA | 8–3 | | | | | 27-7-1 | 10-6-1 |
| April 18 | @ Boston College | Shea Field • Chestnut Hill, MA | 6–9 | | | | | 27-8-1 | 10-7-1 |
| April 19 | @ Boston College | Shea Field • Chestnut Hill, MA | 2–0 | | | | | 28-8-1 | 11-7-1 |
| April 21 | @ VCU | The Diamond • Richmond, VA | 8–1 | | | | | 29-8-1 | |
| Apr 22 | Georgetown | Davenport Field • Charlottesville, VA | 9–3 | | | | | 30-8-1 | |
| Apr 24 | NC State | Davenport Field • Charlottesville, VA | 6–2 | | | | | 31-8-1 | 12-7-1 |
| Apr 25 | NC State | Davenport Field • Charlottesville, VA | 6–3 | | | | | 32-8-1 | 13-7-1 |
| Apr 26 | NC State | Davenport Field • Charlottesville, VA | 6–7 | | | | | 32-9-1 | 13-8-1 |
| Apr 28 | Liberty | Davenport Field • Charlottesville, VA | 5–2 | | | | | 33-9-1 | |

May
| Date | Opponent | Site/stadium | Score | Win | Loss | Save | Attendance | Overall record | ACC record |
|---|---|---|---|---|---|---|---|---|---|
| May 8 | Duke | Davenport Field • Charlottesville, VA | 4–11 | | | | | 33-10-1 | 13-9-1 |
| May 9 | Duke | Davenport Field • Charlottesville, VA | 10–9 | | | | | 34-10-1 | 14-9-1 |
| May 10 | Duke | Davenport Field • Charlottesville, VA | 12–1 | | | | | 35-10-1 | 15-9-1 |
| May 12 | VCU | Davenport Field • Charlottesville, VA | 4–1 | | | | | 36-10-1 | |
| May 14 | @ Virginia Tech | English Field • Blacksburg, VA | 4-5(10) | | | | | 36-11-1 | 15-10-1 |
| May 15 | @ Virginia Tech | English Field • Blacksburg, VA | 8–9 | | | | | 36-12-1 | 15-11-1 |
| May 15 | @ Virginia Tech | English Field • Blacksburg, VA | 6–4 | | | | | 37-12-1 | 16-11-1 |

Postseason

ACC Tournament
| Date | Opponent | Site/stadium | Score | Win | Loss | Save | Attendance | Overall record | ACCT Record |
|---|---|---|---|---|---|---|---|---|---|
| May 21 | Clemson | Durham Bulls Athletic Park • Durham, NC | 6–5 | | | | | 38-12-1 | 1–0 |
| May 22 | UNC | Durham Bulls Athletic Park • Durham, NC | 11-1(8) | | | | | 39-12-1 | 2-0 |
| May 23 | Duke | Durham Bulls Athletic Park • Durham, NC | 11–7 | | | | | 40-12-1 | 3-0 |
| May 24 | Florida State | Durham Bulls Athletic Park • Durham, NC | 6–3 | | | | | 41-12-1 | 4-0 |

Irvine Regional
| Date | Opponent | Site/stadium | Score | Win | Loss | Save | Attendance | Overall record | NCAAT record |
|---|---|---|---|---|---|---|---|---|---|
| May 29 | SDSU | Anteater Ballpark • Irvine, CA | 5–1 | | | | | 42-12-1 | 1–0 |
| May 30 | UC Irvine | Anteater Ballpark • Irvine, CA | 5–0 | | | | | 43-12-1 | 2–0 |
| May 31 | UC Irvine | Anteater Ballpark • Irvine, CA | 4–1 | | | | | 44-12-1 | 3–0 |

Oxford Super Regional
| Date | Opponent | Site/stadium | Score | Win | Loss | Save | Attendance | Overall record | NCAAT record |
|---|---|---|---|---|---|---|---|---|---|
| June 5 | Ole Miss | Swayze Field • Oxford, MS | 3-4(12) | | | | | 44-13-1 | 3-1 |
| June 6 | Ole Miss | Swayze Field • Oxford, MS | 4–3 | | | | | 45-13-1 | 4-1 |
| June 7 | Ole Miss | Swayze Field • Oxford, MS | 5–1 | | | | | 46-13-1 | 5-1 |

College World Series
| Date | Opponent | Site/stadium | Score | Win | Loss | Save | Attendance | Overall record | CWS record |
|---|---|---|---|---|---|---|---|---|---|
| June 13 | vs. #3 LSU | Johnny Rosenblatt Stadium • Omaha, NE | 5–9 | | | | | 46-14-1 | 0-1 |
| June 15 | vs. Cal State Fullerton | Johnny Rosenblatt Stadium • Omaha, NE | 7–5 | | | | | 47-14-1 | 1-1 |
| June 17 | vs. Arkansas | Johnny Rosenblatt Stadium • Omaha, NE | 3–4 | | | | | 47-15-1 | 1–2 |

== Ranking movements ==
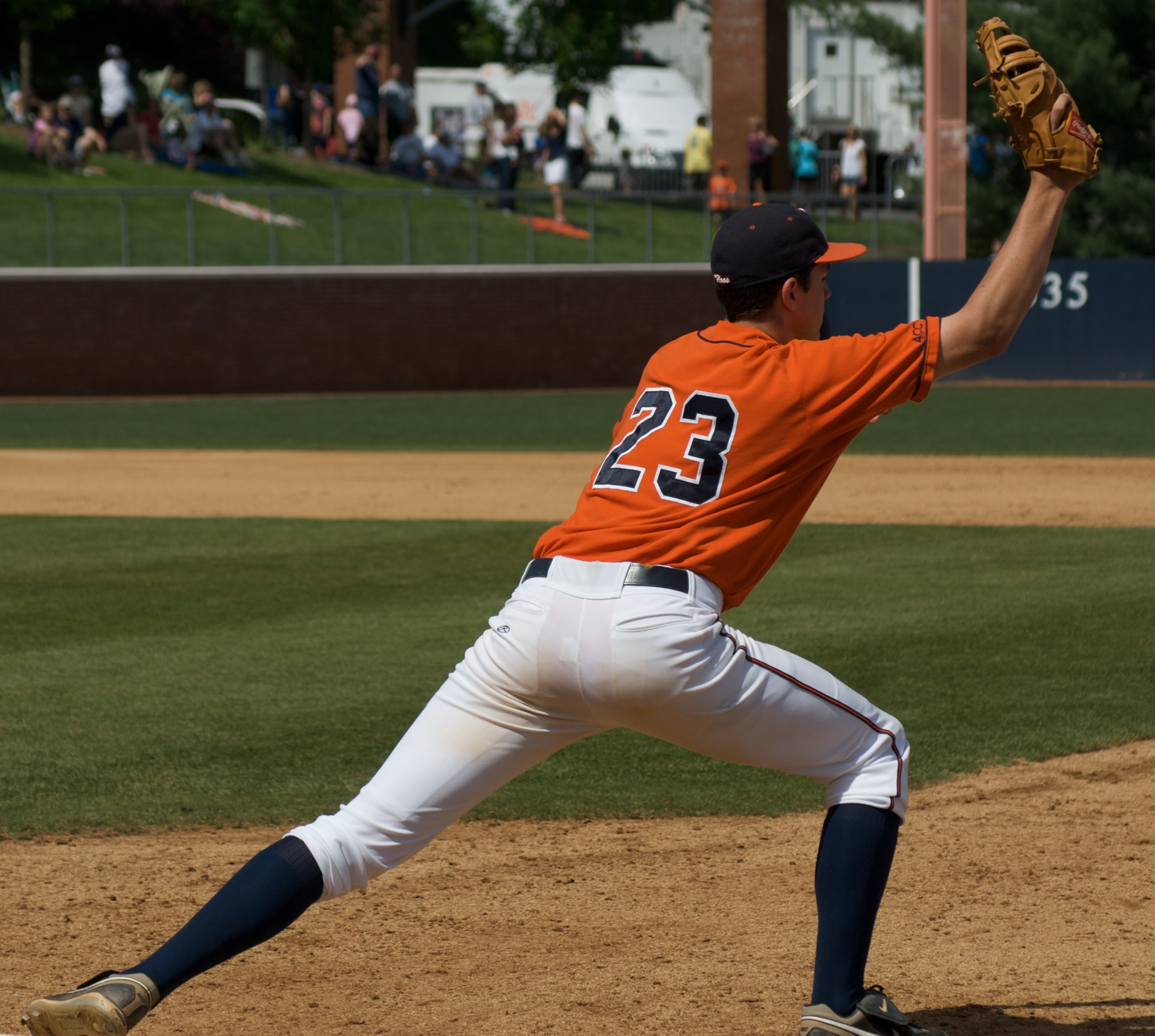
Danny Hultzen at first base for the Cavaliers in 2009

Ranking movements Legend: ██ Increase in ranking ██ Decrease in ranking
| | Week | | | | | | | | | | | | | | | | | | |
| Poll | Pre | 1 | 2 | 3 | 4 | 5 | 6 | 7 | 8 | 9 | 10 | 11 | 12 | 13 | 14 | 15 | 16 | 17 | Final |
|---|---|---|---|---|---|---|---|---|---|---|---|---|---|---|---|---|---|---|---|
| Coaches' | 14 | 14* | 10 | 6 | 5 | 3 | 1 | 2 | 2 | 1 | 1 | 1 | 1 | 1 | 3 | 1 | | | 4 |
| Baseball America | 15 | 13 | 13 | 11 | 7 | 3 | 2 | 2 | 2 | 1 | 1 | 1 | 1 | 1 | 5 | 2 | | | 3 |
| Collegiate Baseball^ | 17 | 14 | 15 | 10 | 6 | 3 | 1 | 1 | 1 | 1 | 1 | 2 | 1 | 1 | 5 | 2 | 2 | 2 | 3 |
| NCBWA† | 13 | 10 | 8 | 6 | 5 | 3 | 2 | 2 | 2 | 1 | 1 | 3 | 2 | 1 | 4 | 1 | | 1 | 3 |

^ Collegiate Baseball ranked 40 teams in their preseason poll, but only ranked 30 teams weekly during the season.
† NCBWA ranks 30 teams in their preseason poll, but only ranks 25 teams weekly during the season.
* A new poll was not released for this week, so for comparison purposes, the previous week's ranking is inserted in this week's slot.
