= Kyle Seager =

American baseball player (born 1987)

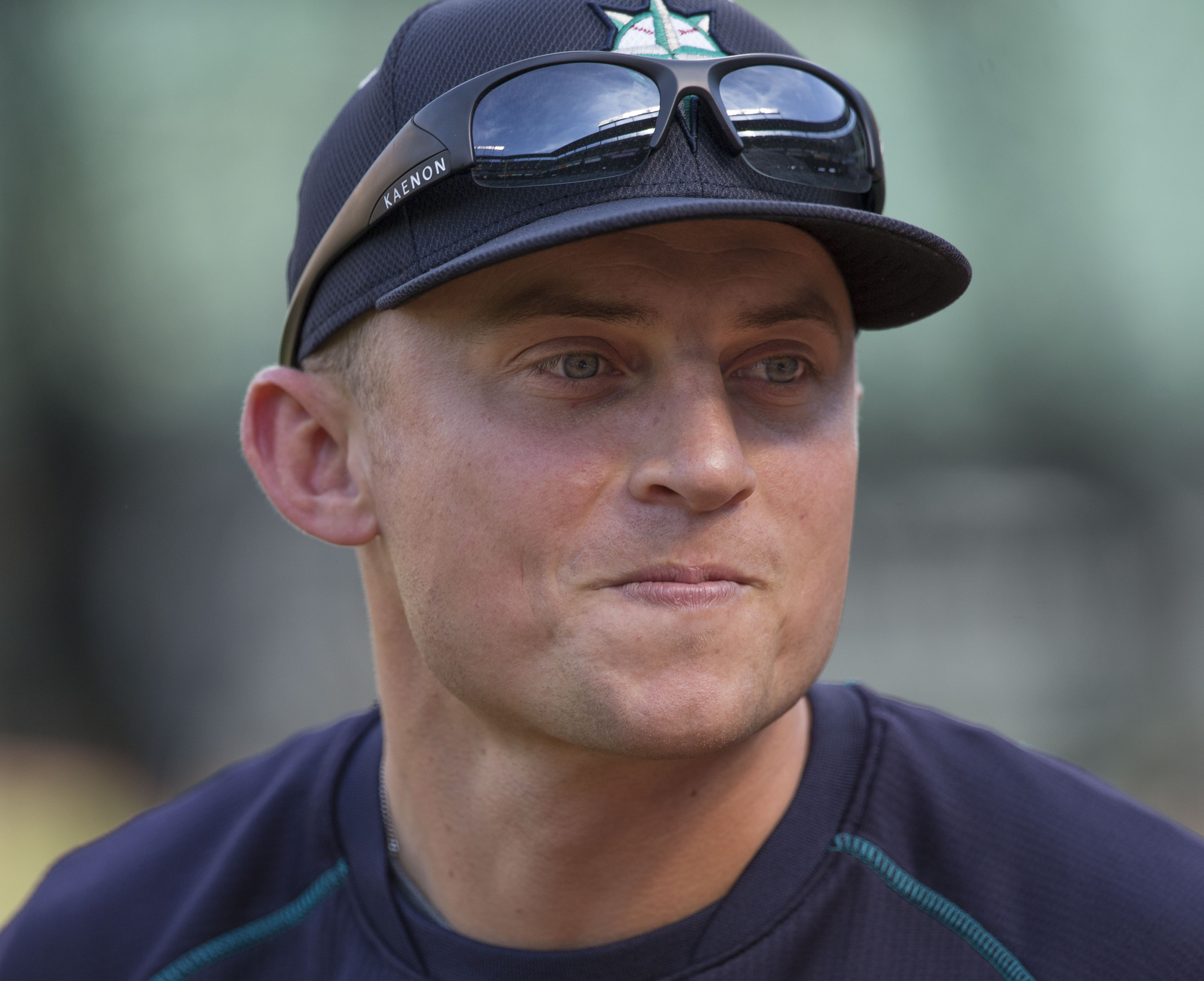
- Seager with the Seattle Mariners in 2015
- Third baseman
- Born: November 3, 1987 (age 39); Charlotte, North Carolina, U.S.
- Batted: Left Threw: Right

MLB debut
- July 7, 2011, for the Seattle Mariners

Last MLB appearance
- October 3, 2021, for the Seattle Mariners

MLB statistics
- Batting average: .251
- Home runs: 242
- Runs batted in: 807
- Stats at Baseball Reference

Teams
- Seattle Mariners (2011–2021)

Career highlights and awards
- All-Star (2014); Gold Glove Award (2014)

Kyle Duerr Seager (born November 3, 1987) is an American former professional baseball third baseman who played his entire career for the Seattle Mariners of Major League Baseball (MLB) from 2011 to 2021. He was selected by the Mariners in the third round of the 2009 MLB draft and made his MLB debut in 2011. In 2014, he was an All Star and won a Gold Glove Award.

== Early life and amateur career ==
Seager is the eldest of three sons. His brother Corey was selected by the Los Angeles Dodgers in the first round of the 2012 draft, while brother Justin was selected by the Mariners in 2013. He grew up a New York Yankees fan and idolized Derek Jeter.

Seager attended Northwest Cabarrus High School in Concord, North Carolina, where he earned Co-North Carolina Player of the Year honors. He enrolled at the University of North Carolina at Chapel Hill (UNC), where he played college baseball for the UNC Tar Heels. With UNC, he had a career .353 batting average with 17 home runs, 66 doubles and 167 runs batted in (RBIs). In 2008, he set a school record for doubles in a season (30), was a semifinalist for the Golden Spikes Award, and was named to the watch list for both the Dick Howser Trophy and the Brooks Wallace Award.

During the summers of 2007 and 2008, Seager played collegiate summer baseball for the Chatham A's in the Cape Cod Baseball League.

== Professional career ==
=== Minor leagues ===
The Seattle Mariners selected Seager in the third round, with the 82nd overall selection of the 2009 MLB draft. He spent the majority of the 2009 season with the Class-A Clinton LumberKings. He hit .275 with one home run and 22 RBIs. He also played one game with the AZL Mariners and two with the Class-A Advanced High Desert Mavericks. Seager spent the 2010 season with High Desert, batting .345 with 14 home runs and 74 RBIs.

He was ranked by Baseball America as the ninth best prospect in the Mariners organization for 2011. He split the season between the Double-A Jackson Generals, batting .312 with four home runs and 37 RBIs in 66 games, and the Triple-A Tacoma Rainiers, where he hit .387 with three home runs and 17 RBIs in 24 games.

=== Major leagues ===
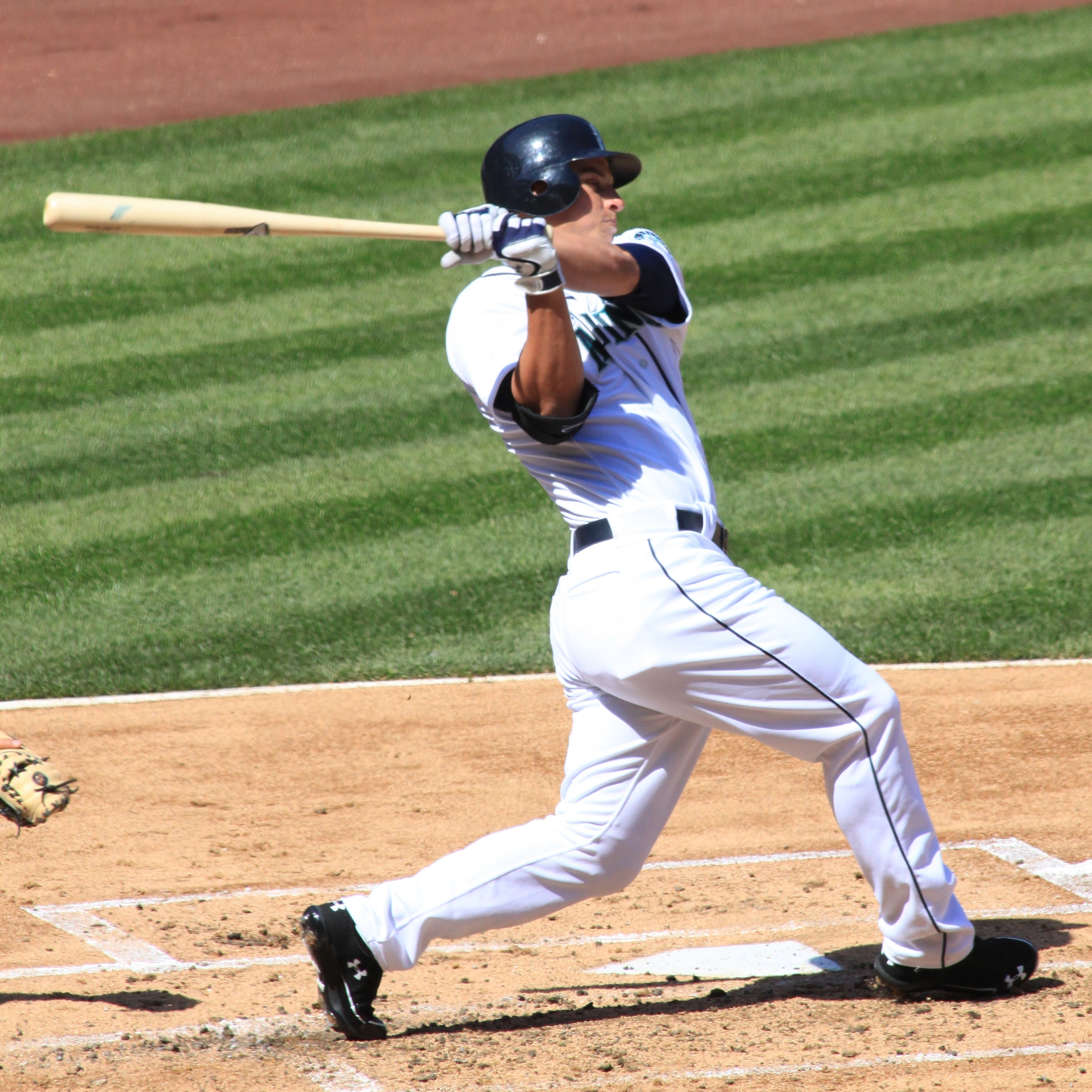
Seager with the Mariners in 2012

On July 6, 2011, the Mariners purchased Seager's contract. He hit his first major league home run on August 19, against the Tampa Bay Rays at Tropicana Field, and finished the year with a .258 batting average, three home runs, and 13 RBIs in 53 games. In 2012, his first full MLB season, Seager hit .259 with 20 home runs and 86 RBIs in 155 games.

On June 5, 2013, Seager hit a grand slam against the Chicago White Sox in the 14th inning. It was the first time in MLB history that a player hit a game-tying grand slam in extra innings. He finished 2013 with a .260 batting average, 22 home runs and 69 RBIs in 160 games.

On April 23, 2014, Seager drove in five runs to avoid a sweep against the Houston Astros. He hit a two-run home run in the seventh inning to cut the Astros lead to 3–2, and hit a walk-off three-run shot in the bottom of the ninth, allowing the Mariners to win 5–3. The first walk-off hit of his career, his performance earned him an AL co-Player of the Week Award, shared with José Abreu of the White Sox. On June 2, Seager went 4-for-4 with a double, two triples and a three-run home run against the New York Yankees. He was the first MLB player with two triples and at least one double and homer in a game since Hal Breeden for the Montreal Expos in 1973. On June 15, he went 4-for-4 with two singles and two doubles and three RBIs. On July 7, he was named to his only All-Star team as an injury replacement for Toronto Blue Jays player Edwin Encarnación. He finished the season with a .268 batting average, 25 home runs, and 96 RBIs in 159 games and won a Gold Glove Award at third base. On December 2, the Mariners finalized a seven-year, $100 million contract extension with Seager. In 2015, he hit .266 with 26 home runs and 74 RBIs in 161 games.

On April 25, 2016, Seager hit his 100th career home run in a game against Houston. He finished 2016 with a .278 batting average, 30 home runs and 99 RBIs in 158 games. He and his brother Corey made history by becoming the first pair of brothers in major league history to each hit 25 or more homers in the same season. On defense, he led the major leagues with 18 errors.

In 2017, he hit .249 with 27 home runs and 88 RBIs in 154 games, his sixth consecutive season with at least 20 home runs and at least 154 games played. On April 7, 2018, he reached 1,000 career hits against the Minnesota Twins. Seager continued his streak of seasons with 20 or more home runs and at least 154 games played, hitting 22 home runs with 78 RBIs in 155 games but hit a then-career-low .221 in the process.

In 2019, during a spring training game, Seager sustained an injury to his left hand while attempting a diving play on a ball. The resultant surgery sidelined him for 53 games; he returned to the lineup in late May. On August 13, in an 11–6 victory over the Detroit Tigers, Seager became the 11th Mariner to hit three home runs in a game and the first since 2010; the third home run was a ricochet off the glove of Niko Goodrum as another Detroit player collided with him near the wall. In 106 games, Seager hit .239 with 23 home runs and 63 RBIs, extending his streak of consecutive seasons of 20 or more home runs to eight.

On August 5, 2020, in a game against the Los Angeles Angels, Seager hit his 200th career home run. On August 17, Kyle faced his brother Corey for the first time in an MLB game. Both homered in the game, becoming the first pair of brothers to homer in the same game since César and Felipe Crespo on June 7, 2001. In the Covid-shortened 2020 season, Seager batted .241/.355/.433 with nine home runs and 40 RBIs and led the AL with 6 sacrifice flies.

In 2021, Seager batted a career-low .212, but set career highs in home runs and RBIs, with 35 and 101, respectively. Defensively, he led all third basemen by starting 43 double plays. The Mariners declined Seager's $20 million option for 2022, instead choosing the alternate possibility, a $2 million buyout. On December 29, Seager retired from baseball at age 34, sticking to type by understatedly announcing it via his wife's twitter account. Knowing back in spring training that the Mariners were likely not going to pick up the option, Seager went into the 2021 season expecting it to be his last. Each year it had become more onerous to prepare for the coming season; combined with his missing out on time with his growing family, he was ready to move on to the next phase of his life.

Seager ended his career with a healthy .763 OPS. A clutch hitter, he had an OPS of .822 with runners on base and of .828 with RISP. The Mariners never made the playoffs during his tenure.

During the following off-season, the Texas Rangers inquired if Seager would be interested in coming out of retirement to join up with his brother, Corey, who had signed with the team a few months earlier. Seager declined the offer, saying he was "happily doing chores at home".

== Personal life ==
Seager and his wife, Julie, married in 2011. They have two daughters and a son. They reside in Salisbury, North Carolina. Seager said it was difficult to not be able to bring his family to games during the 2020 season, due to COVID-19 restrictions.

== See also ==
- List of Major League Baseball players who spent their entire career with one franchise
