= Levi Michael =

American baseball player (born 1991)

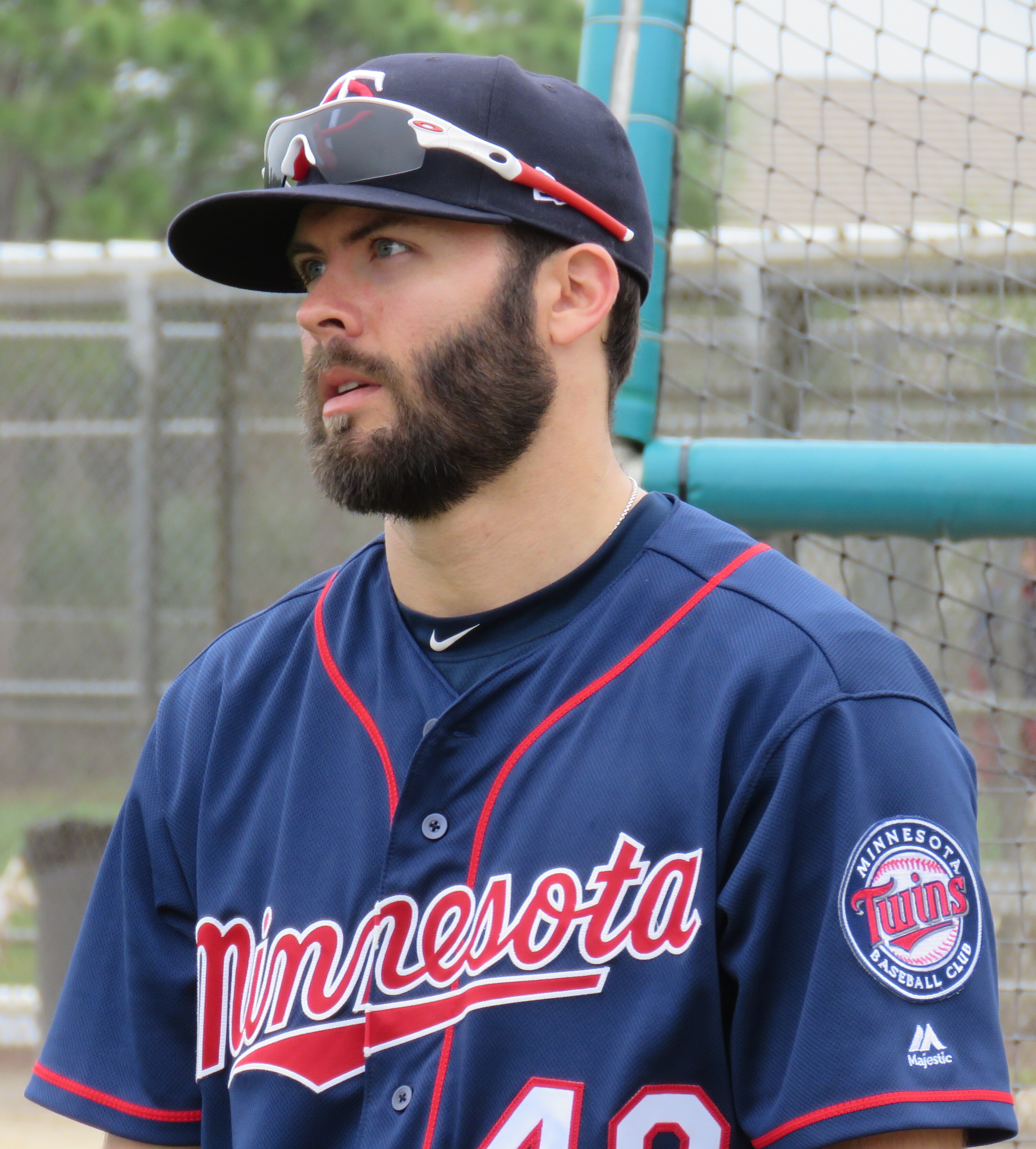
- Michael with the Minnesota Twins during spring training in 2018
- Second baseman / Outfielder
- Born: February 9, 1991 (age 35); Lexington, North Carolina, U.S.
- Bats: Switch Throws: Right
- Stats at Baseball Reference

Levi Burt Michael (born February 9, 1991) is an American former professional baseball shortstop. He was drafted by the Minnesota Twins with the 30th overall pick of the 2011 Major League Baseball draft, but never played in the majors after spending eight seasons in the minor leagues.

== Amateur career ==
Michael grew up in Welcome, North Carolina and attended North Davidson High School in Welcome and the University of North Carolina (UNC), where he played for the North Carolina Tar Heels baseball team, competing in the Atlantic Coast Conference. He graduated from high school in January 2009, a semester early, in order to enroll at UNC in time to play for the Tar Heels that February. As a freshman, Michael batted .290 with a .377 on-base percentage (OBP), a .527 slugging percentage (SLG), and 13 home runs. He was named to the Louisville Slugger Freshman All-America Team and National Collegiate Baseball Writers Association Freshman All-America Second Team in 2009.

As a sophomore, Michael batted .356 with a .480 OBP, .575 SLG, and nine home runs. After the 2010 season, he played collegiate summer baseball with the Harwich Mariners of the Cape Cod Baseball League, and was named a league all-star. As a junior, Michael batted .289 with 14 doubles, three triples, five home runs and 48 runs batted in. Michael played second base in his freshman year, third base in his sophomore year, and shortstop in his junior year.

== Professional career ==
=== Minnesota Twins ===
Michael was drafted by the Minnesota Twins in the first round (30th overall) of the 2011 Major League Baseball draft.

Michael began his professional career in 2012 with the Fort Myers Miracle of the High-A Florida State League. In 117 games, he batted .246 with two home runs and 38 RBIs. He returned to Fort Myers in 2013, batting .229 with four home runs and 28 RBIs in 94 games. He began the 2014 season with Fort Myers, and received a midseason promotion to the New Britain Rock Cats of the Double-A Eastern League. In 45 games for Fort Myers he hit .305 with one home run and 21 RBIs, and in 15 games for New Britain he slashed .340/.444/.358. Michael spent the 2015 season with Minnesota's new Double-A affiliate, the Chattanooga Lookouts of the Southern League, where he batted .267 with five home runs and 31 RBIs in 63 games. He returned to Chattanooga in 2016 and hit .215 with two home runs and 27 RBIs in 96 games. In 2017, he began the season with Chattanooga and was promoted to the Triple-A Rochester Red Wings toward the end of the 2017 season. In 100 total games between the two clubs, he batted .262 with seven home runs and 49 RBIs. Michael was granted his release on March 26, 2018.

=== New York Mets ===
On March 27, 2018, Michael signed a minor-league contract with the New York Mets. He spent the year with the Double-A Binghamton Mets, also playing in three games for the Triple–A Las Vegas 51s. In 103 games for Binghamton, Michael batted .305/.391/.470 with a career–high 10 home runs, 36 RBI and 13 stolen bases. He elected free agency after the year on November 2.

=== San Francisco Giants ===
On November 20, 2018, Michael signed a minor-league contract with the San Francisco Giants organization. He played in 117 games split between the Double–A Richmond Flying Squirrels and Triple–A Sacramento River Cats, hitting a cumulative .240/.318/.384 with 10 home runs and 52 RBI. Michael became a free agent following the season on November 4, 2019.

=== Minnesota Twins (second stint) ===
On January 28, 2020, Michael returned to the Minnesota Twins on a minor league contract that included an invitation to spring training. He did not play in a game in 2020 due to the cancellation of the minor league season because of the COVID-19 pandemic. On November 2, Michael elected free agency.

On April 17, 2021, Michael retired from professional baseball.
