= Dustin Ackley =

American baseball player (born 1988)

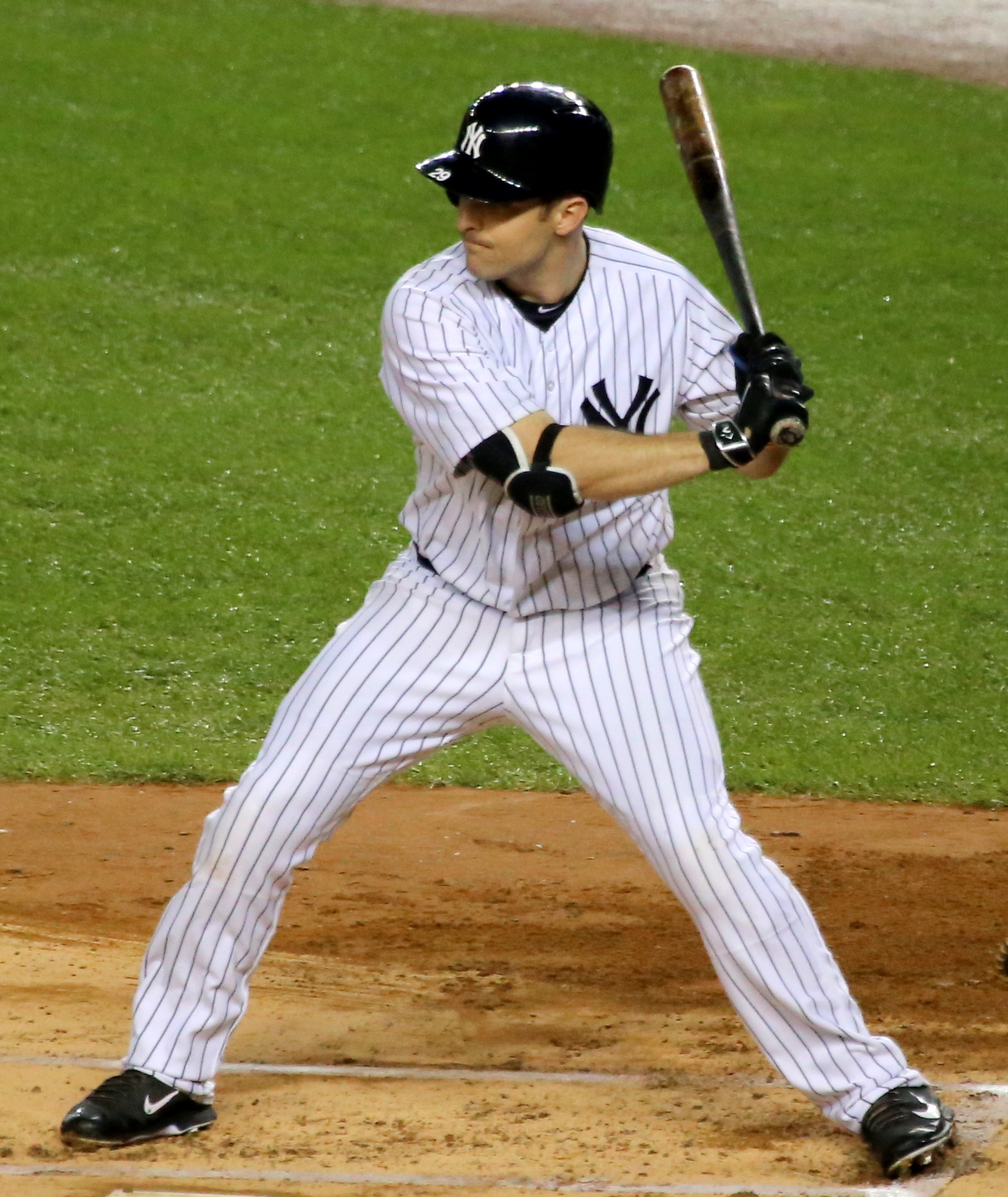
- Ackley with the New York Yankees in 2015
- Second baseman / Outfielder
- Born: February 26, 1988 (age 38); Winston-Salem, North Carolina, U.S.
- Batted: Left Threw: Right

MLB debut
- June 17, 2011, for the Seattle Mariners

Last MLB appearance
- May 29, 2016, for the New York Yankees

MLB statistics
- Batting average: .241
- Home runs: 46
- Runs batted in: 216
- Stats at Baseball Reference

Teams
- Seattle Mariners (2011–2015); New York Yankees (2015–2016)

Dustin Michael Ackley (born February 26, 1988) is an American former professional baseball second baseman and outfielder. He played in Major League Baseball (MLB) for the Seattle Mariners and New York Yankees.

Ackley played college baseball for the North Carolina Tar Heels, and was selected second overall by the Mariners in the 2009 Major League Baseball draft. After going through a transformation to develop his skills defensively at second base, he joined the Mariners June 17, 2011. The Mariners traded him to the Yankees during the 2015 season.

== Amateur career ==
=== High school ===
Ackley attended South Stokes High School in Walnut Cove, North Carolina, for his first three years of high school, where he played for the school's baseball team. He transferred to North Forsyth High School in Winston-Salem, North Carolina, for his senior year, after the coach of the South Stokes baseball team resigned. Ackley chose North Forsyth because he knew several of their baseball players from Amateur Athletic Union competition. He pitched and played third base for North Forsyth. He earned preseason and postseason Louisville Slugger All-American honors as a senior. He was Conference Player of the Year as a junior. He helped South Stokes to North Carolina 1A state titles in 2003 and 2004.

Ackley was a member of the A Honor Roll.

=== College ===
Ackley attended the University of North Carolina (UNC) to play college baseball for the North Carolina Tar Heels baseball team. As a freshman in 2007, Ackley set Carolina single-season records and led the nation with 119 hits, 296 at-bats, and 73 games played. He started all 73 games, including 65 at first base. He recorded a .402 batting average, becoming just the fifth Tar Heel to bat over .400 in a single season. He was the national freshman of the year, earning top rookie billing from Baseball America, Collegiate Baseball Newspaper, and Rivals.com. He claimed the S.H. Basnight Award as North Carolina's most valuable position player. Ackley and the Tar Heels made it to the final round of the 2007 College World Series, losing to the Oregon State Beavers.

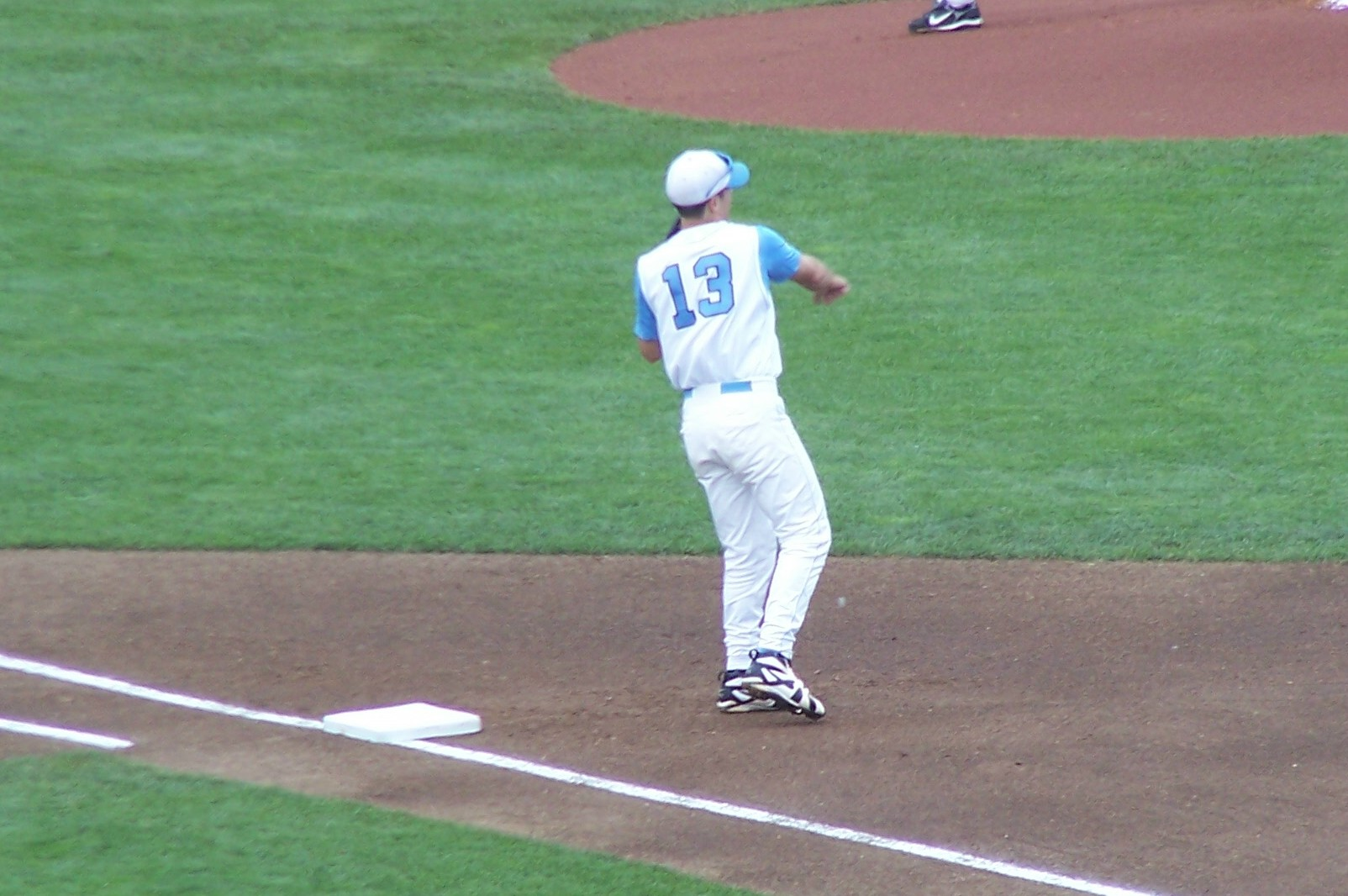
Ackley at the 2009 College World Series

In 2008, Ackley started all 68 games, 60 at first base and eight in left field. He hit .417 on the season with a school-record 82 runs scored, seven home runs, 51 RBI and 19 stolen bases. He ranks as the only player in Carolina history to hit over .400 twice in a career and also posted Carolina top-10 single-season totals in hits, walks, total bases and at-bats. Ackley once again participated in the 2008 College World Series, and was named an All-American. After the 2008 season, he played collegiate summer baseball with the Harwich Mariners of the Cape Cod Baseball League.

As a junior in 2009, Ackley led the Tar Heels with a .412 batting average and 22 home runs, and became the second Tar Heel, following Chad Flack, to record 300 hits and 200 runs scored for the program. He was named Atlantic Coast Conference Baseball Player of the Year. Ackley earned All-America honors for the second straight season. He also was a semifinalist for the Golden Spikes Award, given to the nation's top amateur baseball player, and on watch lists for the Dick Howser Trophy and the Brooks Wallace Award, and also won the S.H. Basnight Award. He again participated in the 2009 College World Series. He was a finalist for the 2009 Golden Spikes Award (behind Stephen Strasburg).

== Professional career ==
=== Draft and minor leagues ===
The Seattle Mariners selected Ackley with the second overall selection in the 2009 Major League Baseball draft. Ackley signed a five-year major league contract worth $7.5 million total: a $6 million signing bonus and $1.5 million in guaranteed salaries, with another $2.5 million possible in salaries depending on how quickly he reached the majors. The deal was later confirmed and an agreement was reached between the Mariners and his agent Scott Boras about 15 minutes before the signing deadline.

Ackley was assigned to the Peoria Javelinas of the Arizona Fall League joining fellow prospects Phillippe Aumont, Josh Fields, Anthony Varvaro, Nick Hill, Joe Dunigan, Carlos Triunfel and Juan Díaz. Ackley was chosen as an Arizona Fall League Rising Star on November 2. On November 20, Ackley was named Arizona Fall League MVP.

First reported by the Mariners' infield instructors, Ackley will be trying to play second base. He came to University of North Carolina as a shortstop but later moved to centerfield, and then later to first base. UNC coach Mike Fox first tried to play Ackley at second base, but later settled in the outfield. Ackley made his debut at second base for the West Tenn Diamond Jaxx of the Class AA Southern League on April 8, 2010, the Southern League's opening day. Ackley led off, going 0–4 with a walk and a strikeout.

=== Seattle Mariners ===
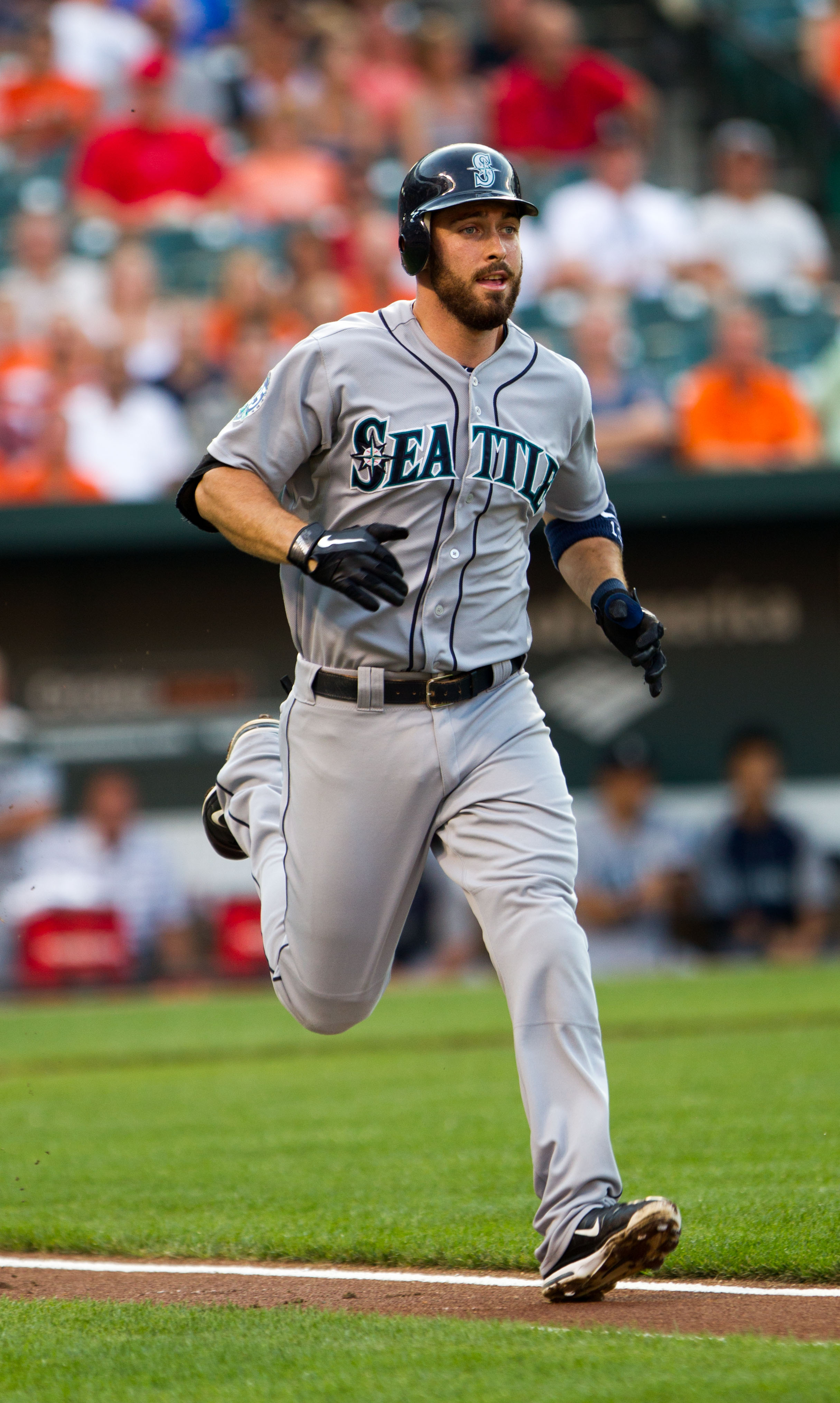
Ackley during his tenure with the Seattle Mariners in 2012

The Mariners promoted Ackley from the Tacoma Rainiers for his first major league start at second base on June 17, 2011, making him the 20,000th player to debut in the Major Leagues. Ackley hit a single in his first at bat against the Philadelphia Phillies' Roy Oswalt on June 17. Ackley recorded his first major league home run on June 18 and his first major league triple on June 19. Ackley finished the season with a .273 average.

On March 28, 2012, Ackley made his season debut in Japan at second base. In his second at-bat, Ackley hit a home run to deep center field off right-hander Brandon McCarthy, the first homer of the season. In 153 games of 2012, Ackley batted .226 with 12 home runs and 50 RBI.

On May 4, 2013, Ackley recorded his first career grand slam in an 8–1 victory over the Toronto Blue Jays. On May 27, 2013, Ackley, unable to stay consistently above the Mendoza Line, was optioned to Triple-A Tacoma to work on his offense. In 113 games of 2013, Ackley had a .253 batting average, 4 home runs, and 31 RBI.

Due to the signing of Robinson Canó, Ackley began playing in the outfield in 2014. In 2014, Ackley set career highs in home runs and in RBI, posting a .245 average with 14 home runs and 65 RBIs after moving to left field for the whole season. Through 85 games in 2015, Ackley hit .215 with six home runs and 19 RBIs.

=== New York Yankees ===
On July 30, 2015, the Mariners traded Ackley to the New York Yankees for Ramón Flores and José Ramírez. Ackley went 0-for-3 for the Yankees before he went on the disabled list resulting from a lumbar strain on August 4. After missing five weeks due to the injury, Ackley batted .288 for the remainder of the 2015 season. Overall in 2015, between both teams, Ackley played 108 total games batting .231 with 10 home runs and 30 RBI.

On May 30, 2016, Ackley was placed on the 15-day disabled list due to a separated shoulder and a torn labrum requiring surgery, prematurely ending his 2016 season. In 28 games, Ackley batted .148 with 4 RBIs.

On November 18, the Yankees released Ackley.

=== Los Angeles Angels ===
On February 4, 2017, Ackley signed a minor league contract with the Los Angeles Angels of Anaheim. He spent the season with the Triple-A Salt Lake Bees, slashing .261/.340/.376 with 6 home runs and 59 RBI in 116 games with the team. He elected free agency on November 6, and re-signed with the Angels on a new minor league deal on April 4, 2018. For the second straight year, Ackley played in Salt Lake, hitting .286/.378/.398 with 4 home runs and 39 RBI in 72 games. On November 2, he elected free agency.

=== Seattle Mariners (second stint) ===
On January 9, 2019, Ackley signed a minor league contract with the Seattle Mariners that included an invite to Spring Training. On March 12, Ackley was released by the Mariners organization.

== Personal life ==
Ackley is married to Justine Ackley, with whom he had a son, born six weeks premature in February 2015. Ackley is the middle of three children born to John and Joy (nee Wall). His father played Minor League Baseball for the Boston Red Sox' organization, while his older brother, Jordan, played baseball at Lenoir–Rhyne University.
