= Southeastern Conference baseball tournament =

American college baseball championship

- Conference baseball tournament
- SEC baseball tournament logo
- Sport: Baseball
- Conference: Southeastern Conference
- Number of teams: 16
- Format: Single-elimination
- Current stadium: Hoover Metropolitan Stadium
- Current location: Hoover, Alabama
- Played: 1977–present
- Last contest: 2026
- Current champion: Georgia Bulldogs (1)
- Most championships: LSU Tigers (12)
- TV partner(s): SEC Network (all games prior to final); ABC (final)
- Official website: SECSports.com Baseball

Host stadiums
- Hoover Metropolitan Stadium/Regions Park (1990, 1996, 1998–present); Golden Park (1997); Lindsey Nelson Stadium (1995 Eastern); Dudy Noble Field (1979, 1981, 1983, 1988, 1995 Western); Cliff Hagan Stadium (1994 Eastern); Swayze Field (1977, 1994 Western); Sarge Frye Field (1993 Eastern); Alex Box Stadium (1985–86, 1991, 1993 Western); Superdome (1992); Alfred A. McKethan Stadium (1989); Foley Field (1987); Perry Field (1978, 1980, 1982, 1984)

Host locations
- Hoover, AL (1990, 1996, 1998–present); Columbus, GA (1997); Knoxville, TN (1995 Eastern); Starkville, MS (1979, 1981, 1983, 1988, 1995 Western); Lexington, KY (1994 Eastern); Oxford, MS (1977, 1994 Western); Columbia, SC (1993 Eastern); Baton Rouge, LA (1985-86, 1991, 1993 Western); New Orleans, LA (1992); Gainesville, FL (1978, 1980, 1982, 1984, 1989); Athens, GA (1987)

The Southeastern Conference baseball tournament (sometimes known simply as the SEC Tournament) is the conference tournament in baseball for the Southeastern Conference (SEC). For many years, it was a partially double-elimination tournament, but changed to a single-elimination format in 2025. Seeding is based on regular season conference records. The winner receives the conference's automatic bid to the NCAA Division I baseball tournament. The SEC Tournament champion is separate from the conference champion. The conference championship is determined solely by regular-season record.

== Tournament ==
The 2025 SEC baseball tournament is the first to feature all conference members, and also the first to use a pure single-elimination format. Previously, it used a variety of formats, all employing a double-elimination format for at least some rounds. The tournament is held each year at Hoover Metropolitan Stadium in Hoover, Alabama. The winner earns the SEC's guaranteed bid to the NCAA Tournament. Most of the other teams who qualify for the SEC tournament more often than not earn at-large bids to the NCAA field of 64 teams, due to the reputation of the SEC as one of the nation's elite baseball conferences. With the expansion of the NCAA baseball field from 48 to 64 teams in 1999, some teams which did not make the SEC tournament before its 2025 expansion still qualified for the NCAA tournament.

== History ==
=== Pre-tournament ===
Teams were split into divisions from 1951 through 1985. Each team played the other four division opponents in home-and-home three-game series. Interdivisional games were common, but did not count in the conference standings.

From 1951 to 1976, the division winners played a best-of-3 series to determine the SEC champion and representative to the NCAA tournament.

=== 1977–1986 ===
From 1977 to 1986, the tournament consisted of four (out of 10) teams competing in a double elimination bracket. The top two teams in each division qualified, and the winner was declared the overall champion.

From 1977 to 1985, the tournament site alternated between winners of the West (odd-numbered years) and East (even-numbered years) divisions. During these seasons, Florida hosted the tournament in every even-numbered year, and Mississippi State hosted in every odd-numbered year except 1985, when LSU supplanted the Bulldogs atop the West.

In 1986, the SEC eliminated division play, adopting a full round-robin schedule (27 games), and the team with the best regular season conference record (LSU) earned the right to host.

=== 1987–1991 ===
In 1987, the tournament expanded to 6 teams (out of 10), while remaining a double-elimination tournament. Beginning with the 1988 season, the winner was no longer considered the conference's overall champion, although the winner continued to receive the conference's automatic bid to the NCAA tournament.

In 1990, the conference did not accept an automatic bid after lightning and heavy rain disrupted the tournament's championship game and co-champions were declared. The teams in the cancelled championship game, LSU and Mississippi State, had already received bids to the NCAA tournament by being selected as regional hosts before the SEC Tournament. LSU led 6–0 in the third inning at the time of cancellation.

Games on the last two days of the 1991 tournament were shortened to seven innings due to torrential rain in Baton Rouge which left standing water throughout the outfield at LSU's Alex Box Stadium.

=== 1992 ===
With the addition of Arkansas and South Carolina to the conference, the SEC held an eight team (out of 12) double elimination tournament. The top four teams in each division qualified. The tournament followed a format that included reseeding the teams once only four were still active in the tournament.

=== 1993–1995 ===
The SEC held separate tournaments for the Eastern and Western divisions in 1993, 1994 and 1995. The tournament games counted in the league standings, and the team with the best winning percentage at the end of each tournament, covering 24 regular season SEC games plus tournament games, was crowned league champion. Each division tournament consisted of all six teams in that division. The SEC devised the plan in the hopes of garnering two automatic berths to the NCAA tournament for each of the tournament champions; however, the NCAA rejected the SEC plan, instead awarding one automatic bid to the division tournament champion with the highest overall winning percentage.

=== 1996–1997 ===
For two years, eight teams qualified for the league tournament; however, the teams seeded fifth through eighth were forced into a single-elimination play-in round. The two winners of the play-in games advanced to the main bracket, which was a six-team, double-elimination format, same as the NCAA regional format used from 1987 to 1998.

=== 1998–2007 ===
Starting in 1998, the SEC adopted the "Omaha" bracket, splitting the eight qualifying teams into two four-team double elimination brackets. The division winners are seeded 1 and 2, while the remaining six teams are seeded 3 through 8. Seeds 2, 3, 6 and 7 form bracket one, while seeds 1, 4, 5 and 8 are in bracket two. The two bracket winners met in a winner-take-all championship game. This was the format used in the College World Series from 1988 through 2002, prior to the NCAA instituting a best-of-3 championship series in 2003.

In 1998, the top three teams in each division plus two "wild card" teams qualified for the tournament. In 1999, the qualification standards were changed to the top two teams in each division plus the next four based upon overall conference winning percentage, which remained in place through 2011.

Since 1996, SEC teams have played 30 conference games (10 three-game series). From 1996 through 2012, each team played all five of its division opponents and five of six opponents from the opposite division. With the addition of Missouri and Texas A&M to the SEC for the 2013 season, teams now play all six division opponents and four of seven from the opposite division.

During this period, the popularity of the event rose significantly. There was speculation the Tournament could move to other larger Southern cities, including Atlanta's Turner Field, but additional RV accommodations secured the event in Hoover.

=== 2008–2011 ===
In 2008, the SEC adopted a "flipped bracket" on a trial basis. The tournament still consisted of eight teams in a double elimination bracket. However, after two days of play the undefeated team from each bracket would move into the other bracket. This reduced the number of rematches teams would have to play in order to win the tournament. A similar format is used at the Women's College World Series, although the team which wins its second game after losing its first switches brackets instead of the 2–0 team.

=== 2012 ===
With the impending addition of Texas A&M and Missouri for the 2013 season, and the lack of any "bubble" in recent years to the tournament (in some years, all eight teams in the tournament and a team or two that does not make the tournament would qualify for the NCAA Regionals), the SEC expanded the tournament from 8 to 10 teams. The tournament began on Tuesday and concluded on Sunday. In 2012, the SEC also began a Baseball Legends Program, which will honor four former SEC baseball standouts, with schools rotating each season.

Both finalists in the 2012 tournament, Mississippi State and Vanderbilt, had to play in the opening round. Since then, no team playing the opening Tuesday has advanced to the championship game.

=== 2013–2024 ===
After the SEC expanded to 14 members in July 2012 with the addition of Missouri and Texas A&M, the tournament was expanded to 12 teams. Seeds five through twelve played a single-elimination opening round, followed by the traditional double-elimination format until the semifinals, when the format reverted to single-elimination.

In 2016, the SEC considered bids from Nashville and New Orleans to move to Triple-A facilities in those cities. Instead, the conference extended its contract with Hoover through 2021.

=== 2025–present ===
In 2025, the first season after the addition of Oklahoma and Texas brought the SEC to 16 members, the SEC expanded its tournament to include all members. It also changed the tournament format to single-elimination throughout. The format is similar to that used for the SEC men's and women's basketball tournaments, with the top four teams in the regular-season standings receiving a bye into the quarterfinals and the next four receiving a bye into the round of 16.

== SEC championship series winners (1948–1976) ==
Year	Western	Result	Eastern
1948	Mississippi State	3 – 0	Auburn
1949	Mississippi State	3 – 1	Kentucky
1950	Alabama	3 – 1	Kentucky
1951	not held		
1952	not held		
1953	Mississippi State	0 – 2	Georgia
1954	Ole Miss	1 – 2	Georgia
1955	Alabama	2 – 0	Georgia
1956	Ole Miss	0 – 2	Florida
1957	Alabama	1 – 2	Georgia Tech
1958	Alabama	2 – 0	Auburn
1959	Ole Miss	2 – 1	Georgia
1960	Ole Miss	2 – 0	Florida
1961	LSU	2 – 0	Auburn
1962	Mississippi State	1 – 2	Florida
1963	Ole Miss	1 – 2	Florida
1964	Ole Miss	2 – 1	Auburn
1965	Mississippi State	2 – 1	Auburn
1966	Mississippi State	2 – 0	Tennessee
1967	Ole Miss	1 – 2	Auburn
1968	Alabama	2 – 1	Florida
1969	Ole Miss	2 – 1	Florida
1970	Mississippi State	2 – 1	Tennessee
1971	Mississippi State	2 – 0	Vanderbilt
1972	Ole Miss	2 – 0	Vanderbilt
1973	Alabama	0 – 2	Vanderbilt
1974	Alabama	0 – 2	Vanderbilt
1975	LSU	2 – 0	Georgia
1976	Auburn	2 – 1	Kentucky

=== By school ===
School	Appearances	Championships
Mississippi State	8	6
Ole Miss	9	5
Alabama	7	4
Florida	6	3
Georgia	5	2
Vanderbilt	4	2
LSU	2	2
Auburn	1	1
Kentucky	3	0
Tennessee	2	0
Georgia Tech	1	0

== SEC Tournament Champions (1977–present) ==
Year	Champion	Score	Runner-up	Site	MVP	Attendance
1977	Ole Miss	7–4	Florida	Swayze Field • Oxford, MS		
1978	Auburn	8–5	Mississippi State	Perry Field • Gainesville, FL		
1979	Mississippi State	12–11	Florida	Dudy Noble Field • Starkville, MS	Mike Kelley (Mississippi State)	
1980	Vanderbilt	13–0	Auburn	Perry Field • Gainesville, FL	Dave Nenad (Vanderbilt)	
1981	Florida	11–5	Kentucky	Dudy Noble Field • Starkville, MS	Jeff Keener (Kentucky)	
1982	Florida	9–3	Tennessee	Perry Field • Gainesville, FL	Rich Bombard (Florida)	
1983	Alabama	10–9	Mississippi State	Dudy Noble Field • Starkville, MS	David Magadan (Alabama)	
1984	Florida	3–1	Tennessee	Perry Field • Gainesville, FL	Alan Cockrell (Tennessee)	
1985	Mississippi State	8–3	Georgia	Alex Box Stadium • Baton Rouge, LA	Gene Morgan (Mississippi State)	
1986	LSU	8–4	Georgia	Alex Box Stadium • Baton Rouge, LA	Jeff Yurtin (LSU)	14,240
1987	Mississippi State	13–3	LSU	Foley Field • Athens, GA	Dan Paradoa (Mississippi State)	5,091
1988	Florida	5–3	Mississippi State	Dudy Noble Field • Starkville, MS	Brian Reimsnyder (Florida)	43,068
1989	Auburn	2–1	Georgia	Alfred A. McKethan Stadium • Gainesville, FL	Roger Miller (Georgia)	22,507
1990^{1}	LSU; Mississippi State			Hoover Metropolitan Stadium • Hoover, AL	Jon Harden (Mississippi State)	32,163
1991	Florida	8–4	LSU	Alex Box Stadium • Baton Rouge, LA	Herbert Perry (Florida) / Brian Purvis (Florida)	21,563
1992	LSU	12–1	Florida	Superdome • New Orleans, LA	Andy Sheets (LSU)	24,329
1993	Eastern: Tennessee; Western: LSU	Eastern: 6–4; Western:7–3	Eastern: Kentucky; Western: Mississippi State	Sarge Frye Field • Columbia, SC; Alex Box Stadium • Baton Rouge, LA	Todd Helton (Tennessee); Harry Berrios (LSU)	8,050
1994	Eastern: Tennessee; Western: LSU	Eastern: 6–3; Western: 5–4	Eastern: Vanderbilt; Western: Auburn	Cliff Hagan Stadium • Lexington, KY; Swayze Field • Oxford, MS	Todd Helton (Tennessee) / Steve Soper (Tennessee); Russ Johnson (LSU)	6,850
1995	Eastern: Tennessee; Western: Alabama	Eastern: 7–2; Western: 9–8	Eastern: Kentucky; Western: LSU	Lindsey Nelson Stadium • Knoxville, TN; Dudy Noble Field • Starkville, MS	Todd Helton (Tennessee) / Scott Vieira (Tennessee); Rusty Loflin (Alabama)	12,572
1996	Alabama	15–5	Florida	Hoover Metropolitan Stadium • Hoover, AL	Joe Caruso (Alabama)	57,231
1997	Alabama	12–2	LSU	Golden Park • Columbus, GA	David Tidwell (Alabama)	42,000
1998	Auburn	7–5	Arkansas	Hoover Metropolitan Stadium • Hoover, AL	Rodney Nye (Arkansas)	87,295
1999	Alabama	9–3	Arkansas	Hoover Metropolitan Stadium • Hoover, AL	G.W. Keller (Alabama)	98,873
2000	LSU	9–6	Florida	Hoover Metropolitan Stadium • Hoover, AL	Wally Pontiff (LSU)	85,653
2001	Mississippi State	4–1	LSU	Hoover Metropolitan Stadium • Hoover, AL	Chris Young (Mississippi State)	85,771
2002	Alabama	6–2	South Carolina	Hoover Metropolitan Stadium • Hoover, AL	Brent Boyd (Alabama)	124,440
2003	Alabama	10–3	LSU	Hoover Metropolitan Stadium • Hoover, AL	Beau Hearod (Alabama)	122,393
2004	South Carolina	3–2	Vanderbilt	Hoover Metropolitan Stadium • Hoover, AL	Steven Tolleson (South Carolina) / Kevin Melillo (South Carolina)	75,259
2005	Mississippi State	4–1	Ole Miss	Hoover Metropolitan Stadium • Hoover, AL	Jeff Butts (Mississippi State)	119,580
2006	Ole Miss	9–3	Vanderbilt	Hoover Metropolitan Stadium • Hoover, AL	Mark Wright (Ole Miss)	108,173
2007	Vanderbilt	7–4	Arkansas	Regions Park (formerly Hoover Metropolitan Stadium); Hoover, AL	Pedro Alvarez (Vanderbilt)	87,893
2008	LSU	8–2	Ole Miss	Regions Park • Hoover, AL	Blake Dean (LSU)	124,139
2009	LSU	6–2	Vanderbilt	Regions Park • Hoover, AL	Mikie Mahtook (LSU)	86,048
2010	LSU	4–3	Alabama	Regions Park • Hoover, AL	Austin Nola (LSU)	126,071
2011	Florida	5–0	Vanderbilt	Regions Park • Hoover, AL	Daniel Pigott (Florida)	97,675
2012	Mississippi State	3–0	Vanderbilt	Regions Park • Hoover, AL	Adam Frazier (Mississippi State)	129,112
2013	LSU	5–4	Vanderbilt	Hoover Metropolitan Stadium • Hoover, AL	Chris Cotton (LSU)	134,496
2014	LSU	2–0	Florida	Hoover Metropolitan Stadium • Hoover, AL	Tyler Moore (LSU)	120,386
2015	Florida	7–3	Vanderbilt	Hoover Metropolitan Stadium • Hoover, AL	JJ Schwarz (Florida)	132,178
2016	Texas A&M	12–5	Florida	Hoover Metropolitan Stadium • Hoover, AL	Nick Banks (Texas A&M)	150,064
2017	LSU	4–2	Arkansas	Hoover Metropolitan Stadium • Hoover, AL	Chad Spanberger (Arkansas)	127,479
2018	Ole Miss	9–1	LSU	Hoover Metropolitan Stadium • Hoover, AL	Nick Fortes (Ole Miss)	144,086
2019	Vanderbilt	11–10	Ole Miss	Hoover Metropolitan Stadium • Hoover, AL	JJ Bleday (Vanderbilt)	162,699
2020	Cancelled due to the coronavirus pandemic					
2021	Arkansas	7–2	Tennessee	Hoover Metropolitan Stadium • Hoover, AL	Jalen Battles (Arkansas)	61,858
2022	Tennessee	8–5	Florida	Hoover Metropolitan Stadium • Hoover, AL	Drew Gilbert (Tennessee)	77,450
2023	Vanderbilt	10–4	Texas A&M	Hoover Metropolitan Stadium • Hoover, AL	RJ Austin (Vanderbilt)	171,288
2024	Tennessee	4–3	LSU	Hoover Metropolitan Stadium • Hoover, AL	Blake Burke (Tennessee)	180,004
2025	Vanderbilt	3-2	Ole Miss	Hoover Metropolitan Stadium • Hoover, AL	Brodie Johnston (Vanderbilt)	159,984
2026	Georgia	11–1^{7}	Arkansas	Hoover Metropolitan Stadium • Hoover, AL	Daniel Jackson (Georgia)	162,016

^1Mississippi State and LSU were declared co-champions in 1990 when the tournament was abandoned because of weather issues.

=== By school ===
Updated as of the end of the 2026 tournament

School	Appearances	W–L	Pct	Tourney Titles	Title Years
LSU	40	95–51	.651	12	1986, 1990^{1}, 1992, 1993^{2}, 1994^{2}, 2000, 2008, 2009, 2010, 2013, 2014, 2017
Mississippi State	37	68–61	.527	7	1979, 1985, 1987, 1990^{1}, 2001, 2005, 2012
Florida	44	79–72	.523	7	1981, 1982, 1984, 1988, 1991, 2011, 2015
Alabama	33	56–53	.514	7	1983, 1995^{2}, 1996, 1997, 1999, 2002, 2003
Tennessee	21	39–30	.565	5	1993^{2}, 1994^{2}, 1995^{2}, 2022, 2024
Vanderbilt	29	63–43	.594	5	1980, 2007, 2019, 2023, 2025
Ole Miss	28	48–46	.511	3	1977, 2006, 2018
Auburn	31	36–55	.396	3	1978, 1989, 1998
Arkansas^{3}	29	40–48	.455	1	2021
Georgia	31	34–53	.391	1	2026
South Carolina^{3}	32	33–57	.367	1	2004
Texas A&M^{4}	11	21–15	.583	1	2016
Oklahoma^{5}	1	2–1	.667	0	
Kentucky	26	26–44	.371	0	
Missouri^{4}	8	2–11	.154	0	
Texas^{5}	1	0–1	.000	0	

^1Mississippi State and LSU were declared co-champions in 1990 when the tournament was abandoned because of weather issues.

^2The SEC held separate tournaments for the Eastern and Western divisions in 1993, 1994 and 1995. The tournament games counted in the conference standings, and the team with the best winning percentage at the end of each tournament was crowned conference champion.

^3The 1992 season was the first in SEC play for Arkansas and South Carolina.

^4The 2013 season was the first in SEC play for Missouri and Texas A&M

^5The 2025 season was the first in SEC play for Oklahoma and Texas
