= 2008 LSU Tigers baseball team =

American college baseball season

2008 LSU Tigers baseball

SEC West Champions SEC Tournament champions
- Conference: Southeastern Conference
- West

Ranking
- Coaches: No. 6 final ranking
- Record: 49–19–1 (18–11–1 SEC)
- Head coach: Paul Mainieri
- Hitting coach: Cliff Godwin
- Pitching coach: Terry Rooney
- Home stadium: Alex Box Stadium

2008 Southeastern Conference baseball standings
	Conf.				Overall
Team	W		L	PCT	W		L	PCT
Eastern
No. 2 Georgia ^{x}‍†‍‍^{y}	20	–	9	.690	45	–	25	.643
Florida ‍‍‍^{y}	17	–	13	.567	34	–	24	.586
No. 25 Kentucky ‍‍‍^{y}	16	–	14	.533	44	–	19	.698
Vanderbilt ‍‍‍^{y}	15	–	14	.517	41	–	22	.651
South Carolina ‍‍‍^{y}	15	–	15	.500	40	–	23	.635
Tennessee ‍‍‍	12	–	18	.400	27	–	29	.482
Western
No. 6 LSU ^{x}‍‍‡‍^{y}	18	–	11	.621	49	–	19	.721
Alabama ‍‍‍^{y}	16	–	14	.533	35	–	28	.556
Ole Miss ‍‍‍^{y}	15	–	15	.500	39	–	26	.600
Arkansas ‍‍‍^{y}	14	–	15	.483	34	–	24	.586
Auburn ‍‍‍	11	–	19	.367	28	–	28	.500
Mississippi State ‍‍‍	9	–	21	.300	23	–	33	.411
x – Division champion † – Conference champion ‡ – Tournament champion y – Invited to the NCAA tournament As of June 30, 2008; Rankings from Coaches' Poll

The 2008 LSU Tigers baseball team represented Louisiana State University in the NCAA Division I baseball season of 2008. This was the final year for the team in the original Alex Box Stadium. A new stadium was built during the season and opened on opening day of the 2009 season.

The team was coached by Paul Mainieri who was in his second season at LSU. In his first year at LSU, Mainieri's team posted a 29–26–1 record and failed to make the SEC tournament or the NCAA tournament.

In a dramatic turnaround, Mainieri led the Tigers to an unexpected appearance in the 2008 College World Series.

== Pre-season ==
In September 2007, Collegiate Baseball newspaper ranked LSU's recruiting class as the top ranked class in the nation. LSU's recruiting class included 9 players that were drafted by Major League Baseball clubs, eight High School All-Americans and three first team junior college All-Americans among the 19 players the Tigers brought in. Baseball America ranked LSU's recruiting as the #2 ranked class in the nation, behind San Diego.

In February 2008, the SEC baseball coaches picked LSU to finish 5th (out 6 teams) in the SEC Western Division in the 17th annual preseason SEC coaches poll.

Also, starting pitcher Jared Bradford was named to the National Collegiate Baseball Writers Association preseason third-team All-America squad. Bradford was also named to the watchlist for the 2008 Brooks Wallace Award, which is presented to the nation's top collegiate baseball player in conjunction with the College Baseball Hall of Fame’s annual induction festivities.

During the offseason, former LSU baseball head coach Jack Lamabe died. Lamabe coached the Tigers for five seasons from 1979 until 1983.

== Regular season ==
LSU entered the regular season ranked #30 in the Collegiate Baseball poll and #34 in the NCBWA poll. They dropped from the ranking after the first weekend of play which saw the team win 2 out of 3 games against Indiana. The Tigers then rebounded and went on a 9-game winning streak before losing the last two games before Southeastern Conference play began.

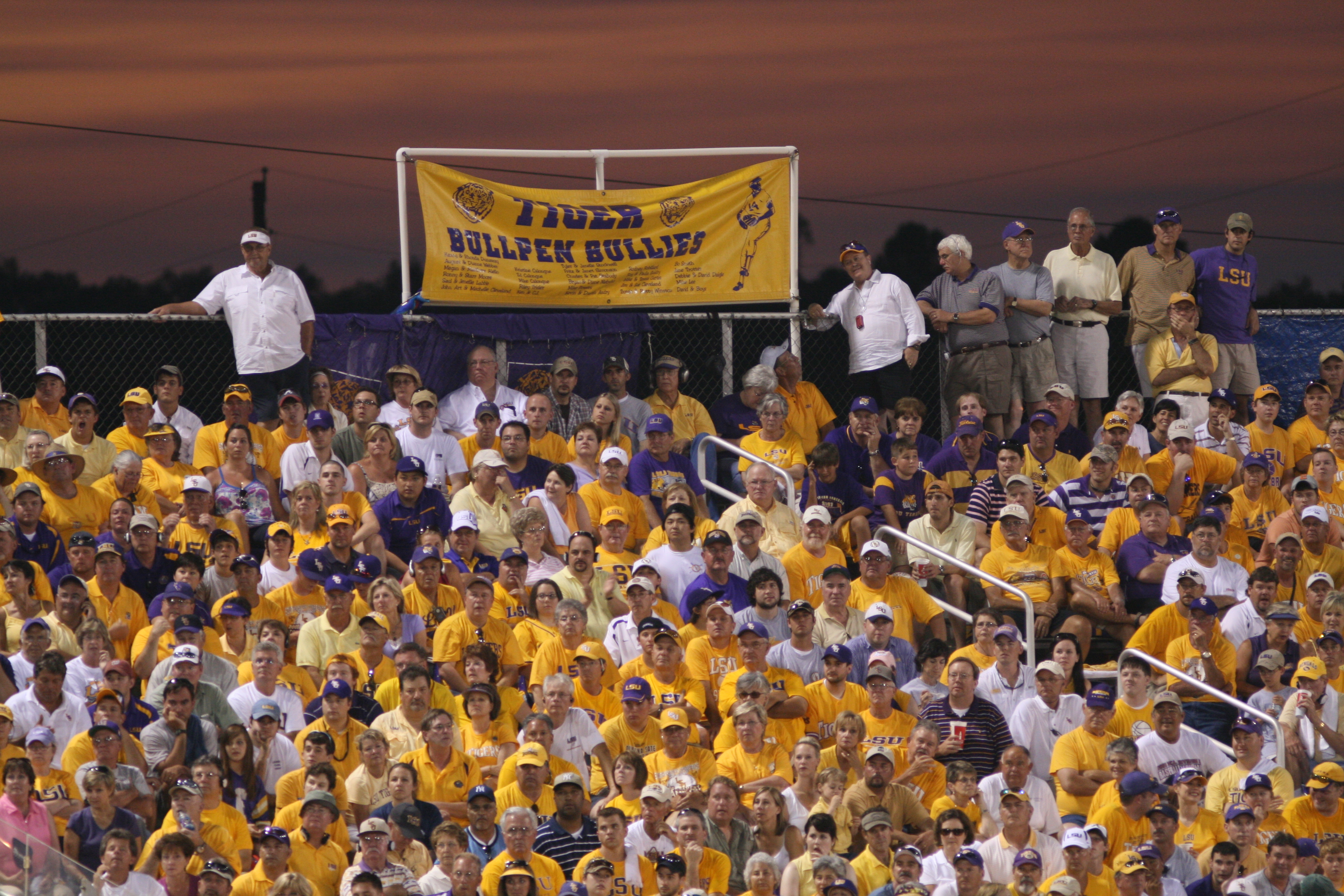
LSU fans packed Alex Box Stadium during the 2008 NCAA tournament Baton Rouge Regional. This was the 18th and final Regional hosted at the park. A brand new stadium will open next year.

In its first conference series of the year, LSU traveled to Knoxville, TN to face the Tennessee Volunteers. The Tigers were swept 3 games to none but were competitive in all games. LSU then defeated their rival Tulane in a midweek game at home before playing host to the Arkansas Razorbacks in another conference series. The Tigers won the series 2 games to 1.

After splitting two midweek games, including a tough loss to the University of New Orleans, LSU headed to Gainesville, FL for a conference series again Florida. The Tigers lost the first two games of the series but salvaged the last one and rode a 4-game winning streak until finally losing to Alabama in game two of their series. But the Tigers won the third game of the series and improved to a 5–7 record in SEC games.

Next on the schedule was rival Ole Miss. The Tigers lost the first game 2–1 in a close matchup and then proceeded to lose the next game as well. LSU managed an 8–2 win on Sunday to avoid the sweep.

After a midweek game against Nicholls State, the Tigers traveled to Maestri Field for their second of three games again the University of New Orleans. New Orleans again pulled away late and won the game by a score of 6–5.

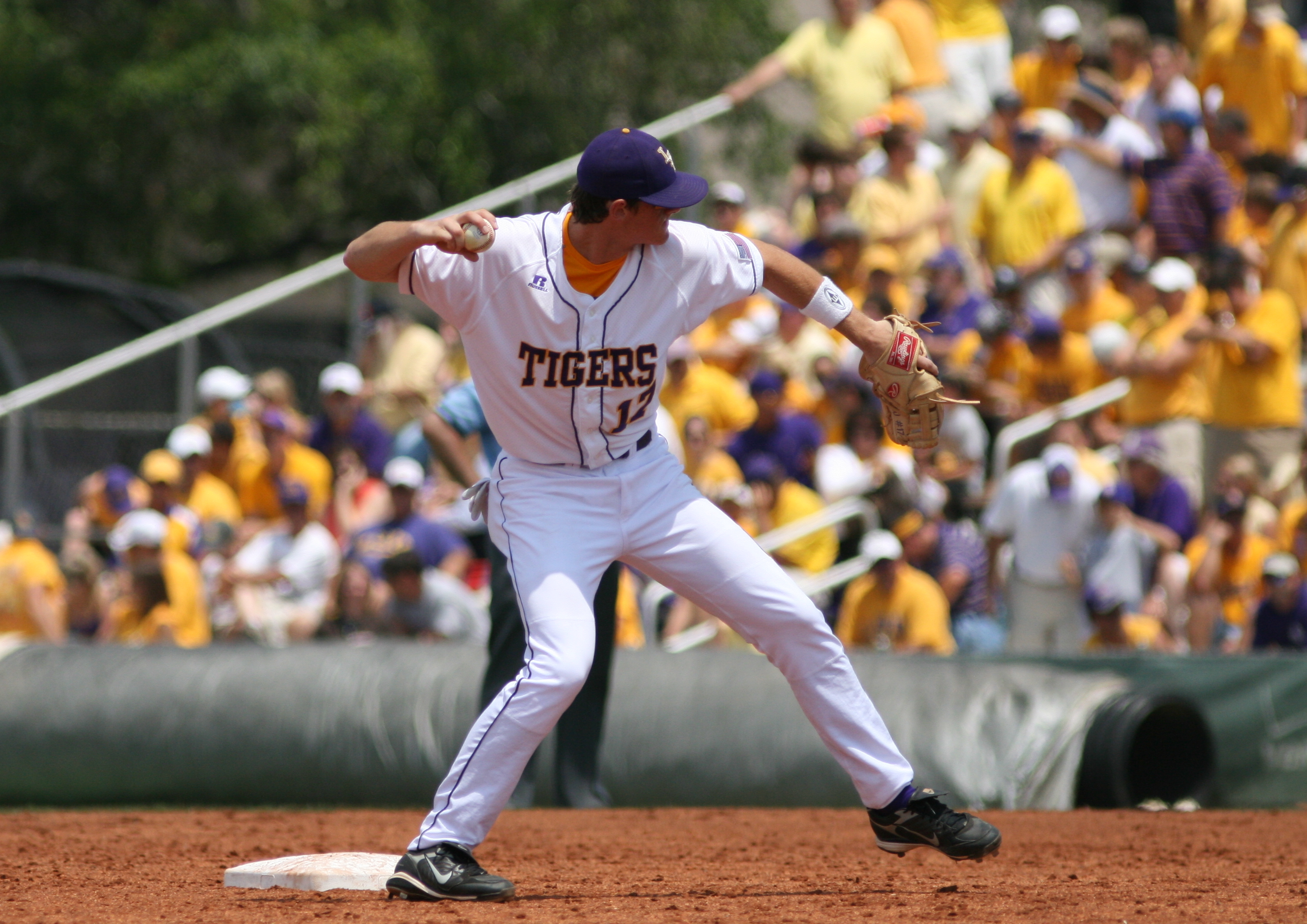
LSU freshman DJ LeMahieu

Georgia then came into Alex Box Stadium for a conference series. At the time Georgia led the SEC and would eventually go on to be the SEC champions. The Tigers played the Bulldogs tough but Georgia managed to win the first two games. In the Sunday game, LSU blew a lead and allowed Georgia to tie the game and send it into extra innings. After 12 innings of play the travel curfew rule came into effect and a tie was declared.

After the Georgia debacle the Tigers had a 6–11–1 conference record and looked to be on the outside looking in for the SEC baseball tournament.

The Tigers were able to turn things around, however, as they began a winning streak that they rode all the way to the end of the regular season and into the postseason.

They started the streak in New Orleans against bitter rival Tulane. They then continued it into their conference series again South Carolina, who was at that time a top-10 team. LSU managed an improbable sweep against the Gamecocks and then moved on to a series against Kentucky in Cliff Hagan Stadium. At that time the Wildcats had only lost 2 games all season in their home stadium. The Tigers again pulled off the improbably sweep and they were now sitting at 12–11–1 in conference, the first time all season that they had been over .500 in conference games.

Mississippi State came into Alex Box Stadium for the final 3 regular season games ever to be held in that stadium. The fans showed up in droves to see the Tigers sweep their third straight conference foe and send "the Box" out in style.

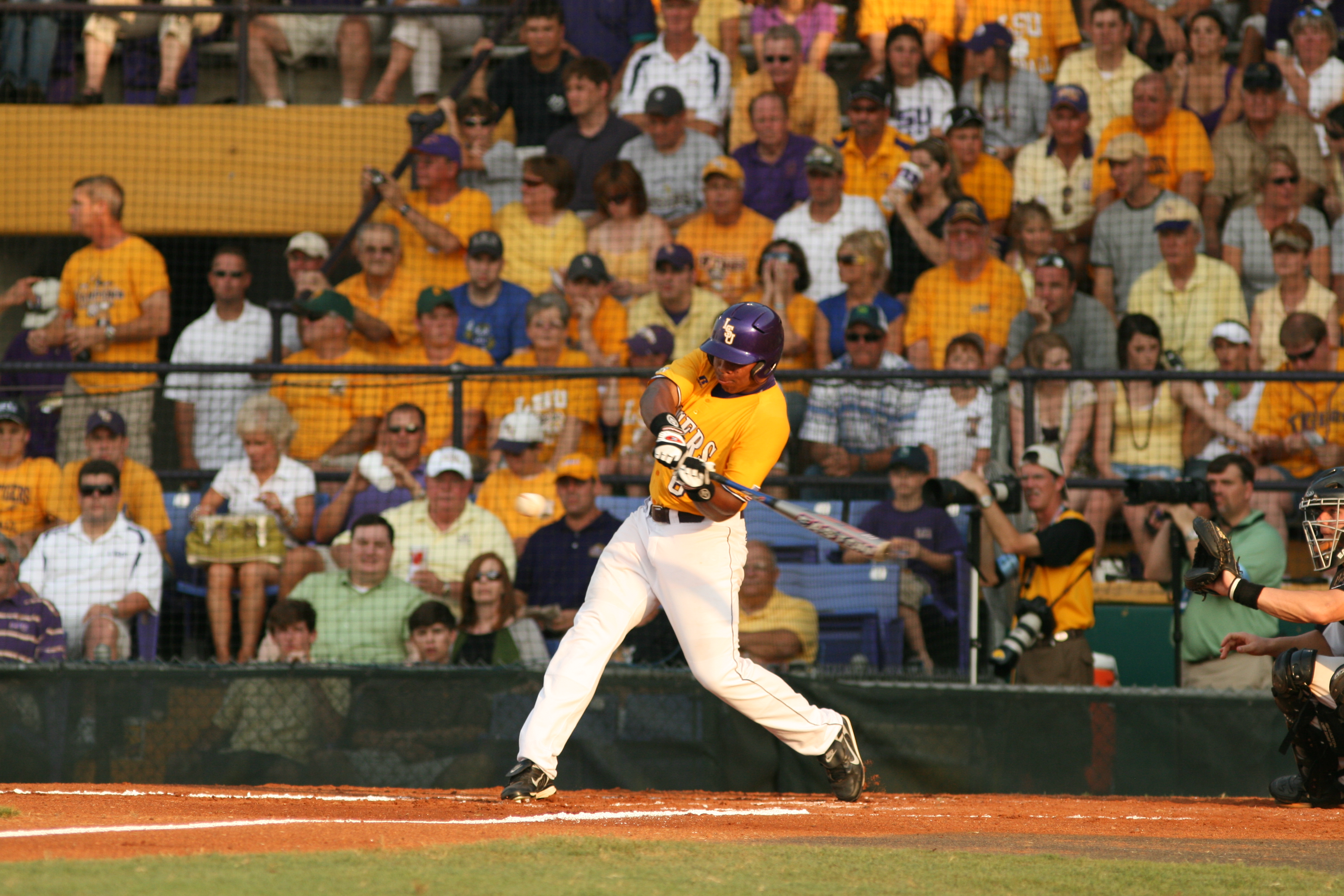
LSU freshman Leon Landry

Next up for the Tigers was their final regular season game against the University of New Orleans in the annual Wally Pontiff Jr. Classic at Zephyr Field in Metairie, LA. New Orleans had already won the previous two meeting and they were riding a 13-game win streak coming into this one. It was the longest winning streak in college baseball. LSU's streak was in second place at 12 games. It looked like New Orleans might extend their winning streak but the Tigers pulled ahead late in the game and won it.

Their final 3 regular season games came against a slumping Auburn team in Auburn, AL. LSU swept their 4th straight conference series and finished the regular season with a 39–16–1 record and an 18–11–1 conference record. Georgia won the outright SEC title but LSU was able to win the SEC West division title. The Tigers headed into the SEC Baseball Tournament as the #2 seed in to tournament.

== SEC tournament ==
The Tigers entered the 2008 SEC baseball tournament on an NCAA-best 16-game winning streak. In Game 1 of the tournament, LSU faced South Carolina, a team they had swept earlier in the season. The Gamecocks took a 4–0 lead into the bottom of the 9th inning but LSU rallied to tie the game and take it into extra innings. In the bottom of the 10th inning, LSU's Blake Dean hit a walk-off home run to end the game at a score of 5–4.

In their second game of the SEC Tournament, LSU defeated defending tournament champion Vanderbilt by a score of 8–2. The Tigers extended their winning streak to 18 games and earned a day off before having to play their next game.

In LSU's third game in the tournament they faced Alabama. The Crimson Tide took an early lead but the Tigers came back to tie the game at six runs and then LSU's Blake Dean padded his tournament MVP resume by hitting a grand slam to break the tie. The Tigers went on to win the game by a score of 12–8 and moved onto the championship game.

The Tigers faced Ole Miss in the championship game, and like many of their games this season, they fell behind early only to rally back to win the game. LSU won the game by a score of 8–2 and claimed the SEC tournament title for the first time since the 2000 season.

== NCAA tournament: Regionals ==
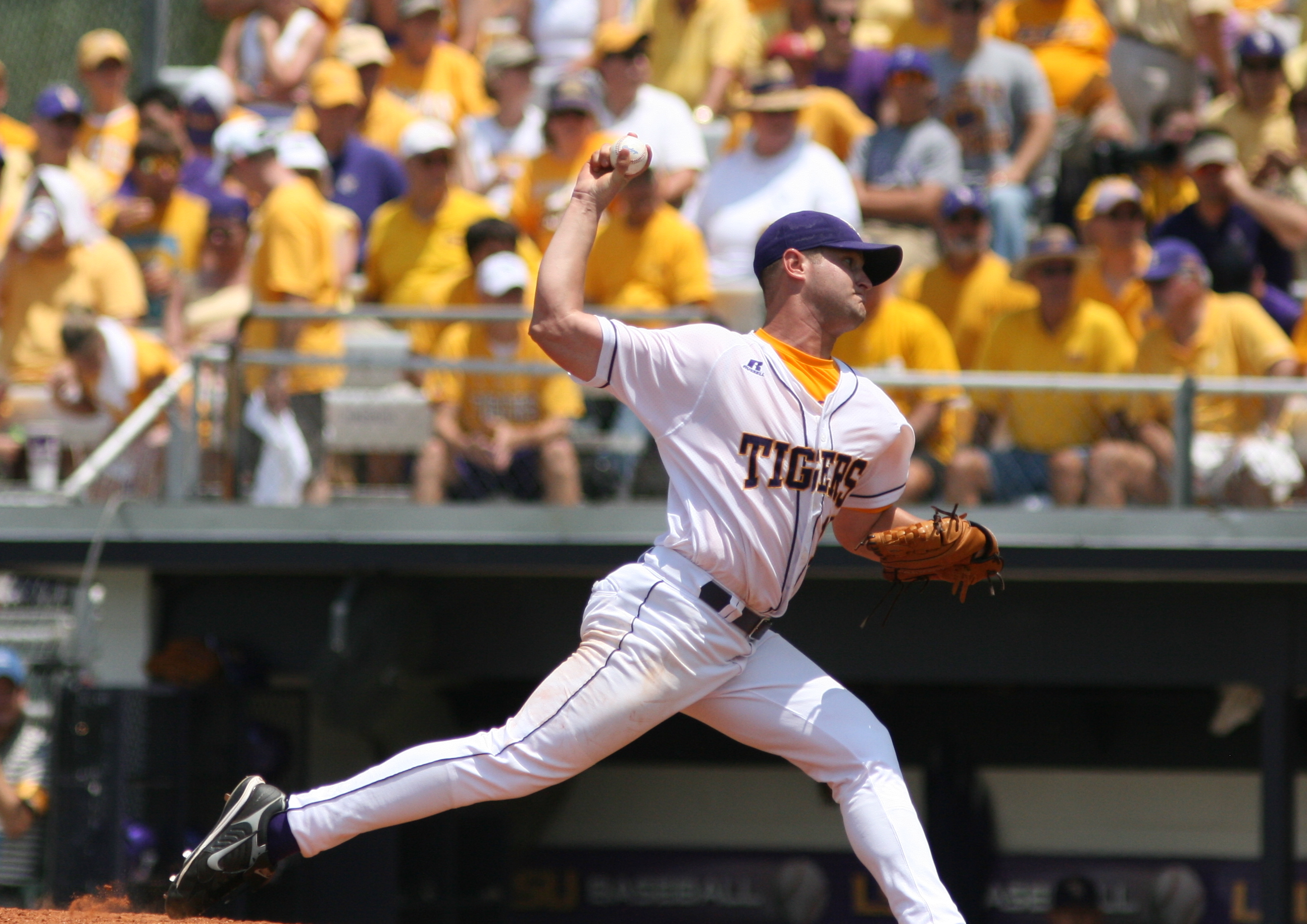
LSU opened the 2008 NCAA tournament with a 12–1 victory against Texas Southern.

On Sunday May 25 it was announced that LSU was selected as a host site for the 2008 NCAA tournament for the 18th time in the history of the program and for the first time since the 2005 season. When the full NCAA tournament bracket was released the next day, LSU was awarded the #7 national seed in the tournament, guaranteeing them home field advantage throughout the Super Regionals as long as they won the Regional round. It was the third time LSU earned a national seed since the advent of them in 1999. In 2000 the Tigers were the #2 national seed and went on to win the College World Series. In 2003, LSU again earned the #2 national seed. They made the College World Series that year but went 0–2 and were eliminated quickly.

In the Baton Rouge Regional, LSU was designated the #1 seed, Southern Mississippi earned the #2 seed, the University of New Orleans, who beat LSU two out of three times during the regular season, earned the #3 seed and Texas Southern earned the #4 seed.

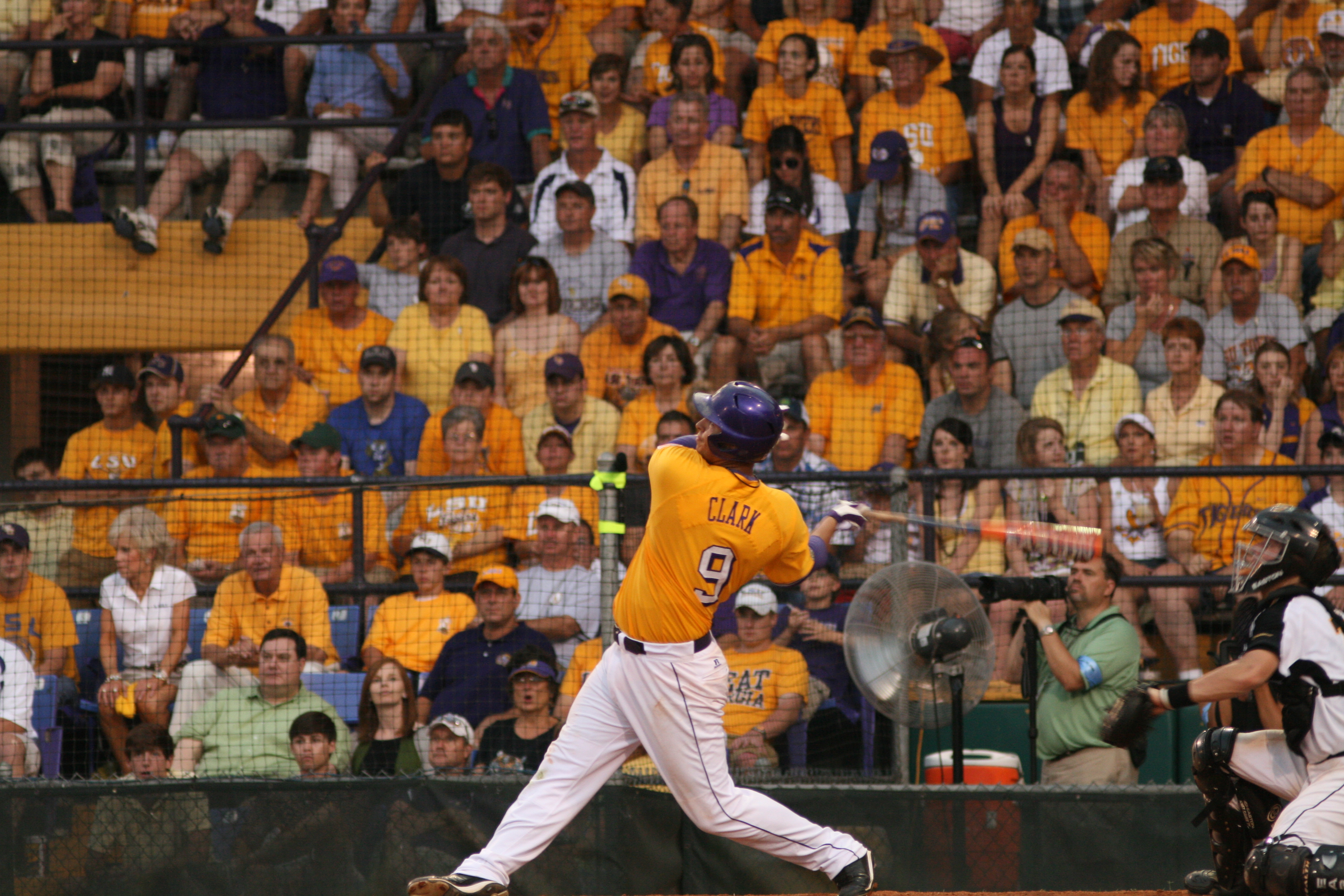
LSU's Matt Clark hits a home run against Southern Mississippi.

LSU opened the Regional against Texas Southern in an afternoon game on Friday, May 30. LSU grabbed a quick lead in the 1st inning and cruised to a 12–1 victory. The Tigers then awaited the results of the night game between New Orleans and Southern Mississippi to find out who their next opponent would be.

Southern Mississippi beat New Orleans and moved on to face LSU in the night game on Saturday. The Tigers defeated the Golden Eagles by a score of 13–4 to advance to the championship round of the Regional.

Southern Mississippi climbed back through the losers bracket to make the championship round and face LSU again. But the Tigers again put the Golden Eagles away by winning 11–4 and moving on to the Super Regionals. The win brought LSU's winning streak to 23 consecutive games and set a new SEC record. The previous record was 22 games set by South Carolina in 2000.

== NCAA tournament: Super Regionals ==
UC-Irvine won the Lincoln, NE regional and moved on to the Super Regional to face LSU in Alex Box Stadium in Baton Rouge, LA. UC-Irvine won the first game 11–5 based on a strong performance by their ace pitcher, Scott Gorgen. The Anteaters looked to be on their way to a second straight trip to the College World Series as they took a lead into the 9th inning of game 2, however the Tigers fought back and won the game in comeback fashion by a score of 9–7. LSU wasted no time in game 3 cruising to a 6–0 lead with three consecutive home runs in the 1st inning and eventually winning the game 21–7. The Tigers celebrated the school's 14th trip to the College World Series in what was the last game in the 70-year history of Alex Box Stadium.

== NCAA tournament: College World Series ==
Prior to the start of the CWS, LSU's pitching coach, Terry Rooney, was named the new head coach of the University of Central Florida baseball team. Rooney stayed with LSU until the end of the CWS.

LSU faced North Carolina in the first game of the 2008 College World Series. The Tar Heels defeated the Tigers by a score of 8–4, giving LSU its 5th consecutive CWS loss and sending them to the losers bracket. The Tigers faced the Rice Owls next and looked to be headed home with an 0–2 CWS record again after trailing by a score of 5–0, however, in typical Tiger fashion, LSU rallied in the bottom of the 9th inning and won the game on a 3-run double by All-American Blake Dean.

The Tigers then had to face North Carolina again, who had lost to Fresno State. The game started on June 19 but was delayed by weather and completed on June 20. The game went into the top of the 9th inning tied 3–3 but a grand slam home run, the first in the College World Series since 2001, gave North Carolina a 7–3 lead. LSU was unable to rally in the bottom of the 9th, and their season was ended.

== Roster ==
=== Coaches ===
Name	Title	First season at LSU	Alma mater
Paul Mainieri	Head coach	2007	Florida International University (1980)
Terry Rooney	Associate head coach	2007	Radford University (1996)
Cliff Godwin	Assistant coach	2007	East Carolina University (2000)
Javi Sanchez	Volunteer Assistant Coach	2008	University of Notre Dame (2004)
Will Davis	Director of Baseball Operations	2007	Louisiana State University (2007)

=== Players ===
Players	Position	Bats/Throws
Buzzy Haydel	INF	R/R
Jared Mitchell	OF	L/L
Chad Jones	OF	L/L
Derek Helenihi	INF	R/R
Leon Landry	OF	L/R
Michael Hollander	INF/P	R/R
Rene Escobar	INF/OF	R/R
Matt Clark	INF	L/R
Ryan Byrd	P	R/L
Ryan Verdugo	P	L/L
Austin Ross	P	L/R
Jordan Brown	P	R/R
Sean Ochinko	C	R/R
Patrick tyler	P	R/L
DJ LeMahieu	INF	R/R
Nicholas Pontiff	OF	R/R
Jason Lewis	C	R/R
Johnny Dishon	OF/C	R/R
Daniel Bradshaw	P	R/R
Kyle Beerbohm	P	L/L
Jared Bradford	P	R/R
Taylor Davis	INF/P	R/R
Louis Coleman	P	S/R
Anthony Ranaudo	P	R/R
Chris McGhee	INF/OF	R/R
Micah Gibbs	C	S/R
Blake Dean	OF	L/L
Matt Gaudet	INF	R/R
Blake Martin	P	L/L
Jordan Nicholson	P	R/R
Nolan Cain	P	R/R
Shane Ardoin	P	L/L
Paul Bertuccini	P	R/R
Taylor Martin	P	R/R
Cody Reine	OF	L/R
Ben Alsup	P	R/R
Stuart Peterson	C	R/R
Kevin Farnsworth	C	R/R

== Schedule/Results ==
2008 LSU Tigers baseball Game Log

Regular season

February
#	Date	Opponent	Score	Site/stadium	Win	Loss	Save	Attendance	Overall record	SEC record
1	February 22	Indiana	7–1	Alex Box Stadium	Bradford (1–0)	Tufts (0–1)		8,675	1–0	
2	February 23	Indiana	5–4	Alex Box Stadium	Brown (1–0)	Bashore (0–1)	Bradshaw (1)	8,406	2–0	
3	February 24	Indiana	6–7	Alex Box Stadium	Leiendecker (1–0)	Ross (0–1)		7,440	2–1	
4	February 26	Southern	6–1	Alex Box Stadium	Verdugo (1–0)	Maloy (0–1)		7,151	3–1	
5	February 27	Mississippi Valley St.	9–1	Alex Box Stadium	Martin (1–0)	Reid (0–2)		6,812	4–1	
6	February 29	Duquesne	10–1	Alex Box Stadium	Bradford (2–0)	Juran (0–2)		7,211	5–1	

March
#	Date	Opponent	Score	Site/stadium	Win	Loss	Save	Attendance	Overall record	SEC record
7	March 1	Duquesne	22–11	Alex Box Stadium	Brown (2–0)	Bugajski (0–2)		7,452	6–1	
8	March 2	Duquesne	12–2	Alex Box Stadium	Verdugo (2–0)	Pierpont (0–2)		7,023	7–1	
9	March 4	Michigan St.	5–3	Alex Box Stadium	Bradshaw (1–0)	Wunderlich (1–1)		6,787	8–1	
10	March 5	Michigan St.	12–1	Alex Box Stadium	Byrd (1–0)	Achter (0–1)		7,103	9–1	
11	March 8	Stetson	9–3	Alex Box Stadium	Bradford (3–0)	Hitchcock (1–1)	Ross (1)	7,408	10–1	
12	March 8	Stetson	6–5	Alex Box Stadium	Verdugo (3–0)	Pugliese (2–1)	Bradshaw (2)	6,986	11–1	
13	March 9	Stetson	2–7	Alex Box Stadium	Donovan (2–1)	Martin (1–1)		7,159	11–2	
14	March 11	Southeastern Louisiana	3–6	Alex Box Stadium	LeBlanc (1–1)	Byrd (1–1)	Collins (1)	7,294	11–3	
15	March 14	@ Tennessee	5–6	Lindsey Nelson Stadium	Crnkovich (4–0)	Bradford (3–1)	Everett (2)	1,372	11–4	0–1
16	March 16	@ Tennessee	3–7	Lindsey Nelson Stadium	Morgado (3–1)	Verdugo (3–1)		1,918	11–5	0–2
17	March 16	@ Tennessee	3–7	Lindsey Nelson Stadium	Lockwood (1–0)	Bradshaw (1–1)		1,918	11–6	0–3
18	March 19	Tulane	7–5	Alex Box Stadium	Brown (3–0)	Pepitone (2–1)	Bradford (1)	7,820	12–6	
19	March 21	Arkansas	8–7	Alex Box Stadium	Bradford (4–1)	Richards (1–1)		7,488	13–6	1–3
20	March 22	Arkansas	13–14	Alex Box Stadium	Wells (1–0)	Bradford (4–2)		7,874	13–7	1–4
21	March 23	Arkansas	4–2	Alex Box Stadium	Verdugo (4–1)	Keuchel (2–1)	Bertuccini (1)	6,970	14–7	2–4
22	March 25	Northwestern St.	10–3	Alex Box Stadium	Coleman (1–0)	Campbell (0–3)	Ross (2)	7,253	15–7	
23	March 26	New Orleans	6–8	Alex Box Stadium	Burch (2–0)	Bradshaw (1–2)	O'Shea (5)	8,322	15–8	
24	March 28	@ Florida	5–8	McKethan Stadium	Bullock (3–2)	Bradford (4–3)	Edmondson (1)	4,531	15–9	2–5
25	March 29	@ Florida	1–7	McKethan Stadium	Keating (4–0)	Verdugo (4–2)		4,015	15–10	2–6
26	March 30	@ Florida	6–3	McKethan Stadium	Bradford (5–3)	Toledo (4–1)		3,290	16–10	3–6

April
#	Date	Opponent	Score	Site/stadium	Win	Loss	Save	Attendance	Overall record	SEC record
27	April 1	@ Southern	8–3	Lee-Hines Field	Ross (1–1)	Brooks (2–1)		734	17–10	
28	April 2	Centenary	6–0	Alex Box Stadium	Verdugo (5–2)	Clark (0–1)		6,634	18–10	
29	4/April 5	Alabama	3–0	Alex Box Stadium	Bradford (6–3)	Hyatt (2–3)	Bradshaw (3)	8,187	19–10	4–6
30	April 5	Alabama	5–6	Alex Box Stadium	Copeland (2–1)	Bradshaw (1–3)		7,611	19–11	4–7
31	April 6	Alabama	9–7	Alex Box Stadium	Bertuccini (1–0)	Kebodeaux (2–4)		7,597	20–11	5–7
32	April 9	@ Southern Mississippi	8–4	Pete Taylor Park	Ross (2–1)	Billeaud (2–2)		5,658	21–11	
33	April 11	@ Ole Miss	1–2	Swayze Field	Lynn (5–0)	Bradshaw (1–4)	Bittle (3)	5,518	21–12	5–8
34	April 12	@ Ole Miss	1–7	Swayze Field	Pomeranz (3–1)	Martin (1–2)		9,412	21–13	5–9
35	April 13	@ Ole Miss	8–2	Swayze Field	Verdugo (6–2)	Satterwhite (3–2)		4,902	22–13	6–9
36	April 15	Nicholls St.	11–2	Alex Box Stadium	Coleman (2–0)	Breaux (1–4)		7,634	23–13	
37	April 16	@ New Orleans	5–6	Maestri Field	O'Shea (1–1)	Bradshaw (1–5)		1,162	23–14	
38	April 18	Georgia	3–6	Alex Box Stadium	Holder (5–2)	Martin (1–3)	Fields (11)	7,116	23–15	6–10
39	April 19	Georgia	8–9	Alex Box Stadium	Weaver (3–1)	Bradford (6–4)		7,854	23–16	6–11
40	April 20	Georgia	10–10	Alex Box Stadium				7,209	23–16–1	6–11–1
41	April 22	@ Tulane	8–4	Turchin Stadium	Coleman (3–0)	Segedin (0–1)		5,017	24–16–1	
42	April 23	McNeese St.	6–0	Alex Box Stadium	Bradshaw (2–5)	Conrad (1–6)		7,184	25–16–1	
43	April 25	South Carolina	11–3	Alex Box Stadium	Martin (2–3)	Cisco (5–2)		7,176	26–16–1	7–11–1
44	April 25	South Carolina	11–10	Alex Box Stadium	Bradford (7–4)	Bangs (3–2)		7,436	27–16–1	8–11–1
45	April 27	South Carolina	6–3	Alex Box Stadium	Verdugo (7–2)	Cooper (5–4)	Bertuccini (2)	7,031	28–16–1	9–11–1
46	April 29	Louisiana-Lafayette	5–3	Alex Box Stadium	Bradshaw (3–5)	Solich (1–4)	Coleman (1)	7,981	29–16–1	

May
#	Date	Opponent	Score	Site/stadium	Win	Loss	Save	Attendance	Overall record	SEC record
47	May 3	@ Kentucky	3–1	Cliff Hagan Stadium	Bradford (8–4)	Green (5–3)		2,335	30–16–1	10–11–1
48	May 3	@ Kentucky	12–5	Cliff Hagan Stadium	Martin (3–3)	Warner (3–1)	Bradford (2)	2,335	31–16–1	11–11–1
49	May 4	@ Kentucky	9–8	Cliff Hagan Stadium	Bradshaw (4–5)	Albers (6–3)	Bradford (3)	2,844	32–16–1	12–11–1
50	May 9	Mississippi St.	15–6	Alex Box Stadium	Coleman (4–0)	Crosswhite (2–5)		8,548	33–16–1	13–11–1
51	May 10	Mississippi St.	16–4	Alex Box Stadium	Martin (4–3)	Bowen (3–6)		8,312	34–16–1	14–11–1
52	May 11	Mississippi St.	9–6	Alex Box Stadium	Bradford (9–4)	Pigott (2–3)	Bradshaw (4)	8,701	35–16–1	15–11–1
53	May 13	vs. New Orleans	7–6	Zephyr Field	Coleman (5–0)	Brown (2–3)		5,626	36–16–1	
54	May 15	@ Auburn	6–4	Samford Stadium	Verdugo (8–2)	Dayton (7–2)	Bradford (4)	2,067	37–16–1	16–11–1
55	May 16	@ Auburn	15–6	Samford Stadium	Byrd (2–1)	Thompson (3–6)		2,122	38–16–1	17–11–1
56	May 17	@ Auburn	11–7	Samford Stadium	Ross (3–1)	Hurst (3–5)	Coleman (2)	2,907	39–16–1	18–11–1

Post-season

SEC baseball tournament
#	Date	Opponent	Score	Site/stadium	Win	Loss	Save	Attendance	Overall record	SECT Record
57	May 21	South Carolina	5–4	Regions Park	Bradford (10–4)	Farotto (0–1)		6,027	40–16–1	1–0
58	May 22	Vanderbilt	8–2	Regions Park	Martin (5–3)	Cotham (7–5)		6,853	41–16–1	2–0
59	May 24	Alabama	12–8	Regions Park	Ranaudo (1–0)	Graham (6–2)		12,324	42–16–1	3–0
60	May 25	Ole Miss	8–2	Regions Park	Coleman (6–0)	Baker (3–5)		11,123	43–16–1	4–0

NCAA tournament: Regionals
#	Date	Opponent	Score	Site/stadium	Win	Loss	Save	Attendance	Overall record	NCAAT Record
61	May 30	Texas Southern	12–1	Alex Box Stadium	Brown (4–0)	Moreno (2–5)	Ross (3)	7,671	44–16–1	1–0
62	May 31	Southern Mississippi	13–4	Alex Box Stadium	Verdugo (9–2)	McInnis (6–3)		8,012	45–16–1	2–0
63	June 1	Southern Mississippi	11–4	Alex Box Stadium	Bertuccini (2–0)	Leach (2–4)	Bradford (5)	7,870	46–16–1	3–0

NCAA tournament: Super Regionals
#	Date	Opponent	Score	Site/stadium	Win	Loss	Save	Attendance	Overall record	NCAAT Record
64	June 7	UC-Irvine	5–11	Alex Box Stadium	Gorgen (12–3)	Verdugo (9–3)		8,023	46–17–1	3–1
65	June 8	UC-Irvine	9–7	Alex Box Stadium	Coleman (7–0)	Pettis (4–3)		8,029	47–17–1	4–1
66	June 9	UC-Irvine	21–7	Alex Box Stadium	Brown (5–0)	Stowell (8–3)		8,348	48–17–1	5–1

College World Series
#	Date	Opponent	Score	Site/stadium	Win	Loss	Save	Attendance	Overall record	NCAAT Record
67	June 15	North Carolina	4–8	Rosenblatt Stadium	White (11–3)	Verdugo (9–4)	Wooten (5)	22,239	48–18–1	5–2
68	June 17	Rice	6–5	Rosenblatt Stadium	Coleman (8–0)	St.Clair (10–3)		19,103	49–18–1	6–2
69	19/June 20	North Carolina	7–3	Rosenblatt Stadium	White (12–3)	Coleman (8–1)		30,422	49–19–1	6–3

== Rankings ==
Ranking movement
Poll	Pre- season	Feb. 25	Mar. 3	Mar. 10	Mar. 17	Mar. 24	Mar. 31	Apr. 7	Apr. 14	Apr. 21	Apr. 28	May 5	May 12	May 19	May 26	June 3	June 10	Final Poll
USA Today/ESPN Coaches' Poll (Top 25)	NR	–	NR	NR	NR	NR	NR	NR	NR	NR	NR	22	21	13	7	–	–	6
Baseball America (Top 25)	NR	NR	NR	NR	NR	NR	NR	NR	NR	NR	NR	22	16	10	5	5	4	6
Collegiate Baseball (Top 30)	30	NR	NR	NR	NR	NR	NR	NR	NR	NR	NR	23	16	8	2	2	2	6
NCBWA (Top 30)^	34	NR	NR	NR	NR	NR	NR	NR	NR	NR	NR	27	24	16	11	7	5	6
Rivals.com (Top 25)	NR	NR	NR	NR	NR	NR	NR	NR	NR	NR	NR	21	16	15	6	–	–	6
NR = Not ranked

- ^ The NCBWA ranked 35 teams in their preseason poll but only 30 teams during the season.

== Awards and honors ==
Player	Award/Honor
Jared Bradford	SEC Pitcher of the Week (April 28 – May 5); LSWA Pitcher of the Week (April 28 – May 5); SEC All-Defensive Team
Matt Clark	LSWA Player of the Week (February 26 – March 3); LSWA Player of the Week (May 12 – May 19); SEC All-Tournament Team – 1B
Blake Dean	LSWA Player of the Week (April 21 – April 28); SEC All-Tournament Team – DH & MVP; Louisville Slugger National Player of the Week (May 20 – May 26); Baseball America First-Team All-American
Micah Gibbs	SEC All-Freshman Team; Baseball America First Team Freshman All-American
Michael Hollander	SEC Baseball Community Service Team
Blake Martin	LSWA Pitcher of the Week (April 21 – April 28); SEC All-Tournament Team – P
Patrick tyler	LSWA Pitcher of the Week (March 31 – April 7)
Ryan Schimpf	SEC Player of the Week (May 6 – May 12); LSWA Player of the Week (May 6 – May 12); SEC All-Tournament Team – 2B
Ryan Verdugo	SEC Pitcher of the Week (February 26 – March 3)

== LSU Tigers in the 2008 Major League Baseball draft ==
The following members of the 2008 LSU Tigers baseball team were drafted in the 2008 MLB draft.

Player	Position	Round	Overall	MLB team
Ryan Verdugo	LHP	9th	267	San Francisco Giants
Matt Clark	1B	12th	375	San Diego Padres
Louis Coleman	RHP	14th	421	Washington Nationals
Blake Martin	LHP	17th	516	Minnesota Twins
Jared Bradford	RHP	18th	545	St. Louis Cardinals
Michael Hollander	3B	20th	603	Texas Rangers
Jordan Brown	RHP	39th	1181	Chicago Cubs
