= 2008 Vanderbilt Commodores baseball team =

American college baseball season

2008 Vanderbilt Commodores baseball
- Conference: Southeastern Conference
- East
- Record: 41-22 (15-14 SEC)
- Head coach: Tim Corbin
- Home stadium: Hawkins Field

2008 Southeastern Conference baseball standings
	Conf.				Overall
Team	W		L	PCT	W		L	PCT
Eastern
No. 2 Georgia ^{x}‍†‍‍^{y}	20	–	9	.690	45	–	25	.643
Florida ‍‍‍^{y}	17	–	13	.567	34	–	24	.586
No. 25 Kentucky ‍‍‍^{y}	16	–	14	.533	44	–	19	.698
Vanderbilt ‍‍‍^{y}	15	–	14	.517	41	–	22	.651
South Carolina ‍‍‍^{y}	15	–	15	.500	40	–	23	.635
Tennessee ‍‍‍	12	–	18	.400	27	–	29	.482
Western
No. 6 LSU ^{x}‍‍‡‍^{y}	18	–	11	.621	49	–	19	.721
Alabama ‍‍‍^{y}	16	–	14	.533	35	–	28	.556
Ole Miss ‍‍‍^{y}	15	–	15	.500	39	–	26	.600
Arkansas ‍‍‍^{y}	14	–	15	.483	34	–	24	.586
Auburn ‍‍‍	11	–	19	.367	28	–	28	.500
Mississippi State ‍‍‍	9	–	21	.300	23	–	33	.411
x – Division champion † – Conference champion ‡ – Tournament champion y – Invited to the NCAA tournament As of June 30, 2008; Rankings from Coaches' Poll

The 2008 Vanderbilt Commodores baseball team represented Vanderbilt University in the 2008 NCAA Division I baseball season. The team played at Hawkins Field in Nashville, Tennessee.

The team was coached by Tim Corbin in his sixth season at Vanderbilt. The previous season, Corbin's team posted a 54–13 record and won the SEC regular season crown and the SEC tournament. They also hosted a regional for the first time in school history, eventually falling to Michigan in an extra-innings heartbreaker.

== Roster ==
=== Coaches ===
Name	Title	First season at VU	Alma mater
Tim Corbin	Head coach	2003	Ohio Wesleyan University (1984)
Erik Bakich	Assistant coach	2003	East Carolina University (2000)
Derek Johnson	Assistant coach	2002	Eastern Illinois University (1994)
Blake Allen	Volunteer Assistant Coach	2005	Blackburn College (2001)
Mike Calitri	Director of Baseball Operations	2006	Clemson University (2004)

=== Players ===
Number	Player	Position	Bats/Throws
1	David Macias	OF	S/R
2	Jason Cunningham	LHP	L/L
3	Dominic de la Osa	OF	R/R
5	Andrew Giobbi	C	R/R
6	Brian Harris	INF	R/R
7	Parker Hanks	OF	R/R
8	Alex Feinberg	INF	R/R
9	Curt Casali	C	R/R
11	Nick Christiani	RHP	R/R
12	Mike Minor	LHP	L/L
15	Richie Goodenow	LHP	L/L
17	Shea Robin	C	R/R
18	Sean Bierman	LHP	L/L
19	Ben Blanton	LHP	L/L
20	Kellen St. Luce	LHP	L/L
21	Brett Jacobson	RHP	R/R
22	Ryan Flaherty	INF	L/R
24	Pedro Alvarez	INF	L/R
25	Steven Liddle	OF	L/L
26	Jordan Wormsley	OF	L/L
27	Caleb Cotham	RHP	R/R
28	Brad French	INF	R/R
31	Russell Brewer	INF/RHP	R/R
32	Gabe Ortiz	INF	R/R
33	Drew Hayes	RHP	R/R
34	Taylor Hill	RHP	R/R
36	Aaron Westlake	INF	L/R
39	Jared Cohen	RHP/OF	R/R
40	Johnathan White	OF	L/L
42	Chase Reid	RHP	L/R
43	Steven Schwartz	RHP	L/R
44	Mark Lamm	RHP	R/R
45	Drew Fann	C	R/R
46	Adam Cronk	INF	R/R
51	Alex Hilliard	OF	R/R
55	Joey Manning	OF	R/R

== Schedule ==
2008 Game Log
Regular season

#	Date	Opponent	Location	Score	Win	Loss	Save	Attendance	Record	SEC
1	February 22	vs. #11 Oregon State	Packard Stadium	8-1	Minor (1–0)	Stutes, M. (0–1)	Cotham (1)	?	1-0	
2	February 23	@ #1 Arizona State	Packard Stadium	18-6	Leake (1–0)	Jacobson (0–1)		3300	1-1	
3	February 24	vs. Miami (OH)	Packard Stadium	4-3	Reid (1–0)	Oberschlake (0–1)		?	2-1	
4	February 27	Evansville	Hawkins Field	4-3	Brewer (1–0)	McCarthy (0–1)		224	3-1	
5	February 29	Kansas	Hawkins Field	7-1	Minor (2–0)	Czyz (0–2)		700	4-1	
6	March 1	Iowa	Hawkins Field	6-3	Jacobs (1-1)	Jacobson (0–2)	Mossey (1)	1200	4-2	
7	March 2	Xavier	Hawkins Field	17-3	Christiani (1–0)	Rosenbaum (0–2)		1521	5-2	
8	March 4	Louisville	Hawkins Field	17-6	Cotham (1–0)	Belanger (0–1)		122	6-2	
9	March 6	Illinois-Chicago	Hawkins Field	2-1	Kohlstaedt (2–1)	Minor (2–1)		341	6-3	
10	March 7	Illinois-Chicago	Hawkins Field	5-4	Reid (2–0)	Worthington (0–1)		121	7-3	
--	March 8	Illinois-Chicago	Hawkins Field	Canceled (snow)						
11	March 9	Illinois-Chicago	Hawkins Field	9-3	Schwartz (1–0)	Kool (1–2)		524	8-3	
12	March 11	Western Carolina	Hawkins Field	5-3	Cotham (2–0)	Saberhagen (0–2)	Brewer (1)	324	9-3	
13	March 12	Western Carolina	Hawkins Field	11-4	Hill (1–0)	Sexton (0–2)	Jacobson (1)	752	10-3	
14	March 14	#6 South Carolina	Hawkins Field	4-3 (13)	Brewer (2–0)	Todd (0–1)		1863	11-3	1–0
15	March 15	#6 South Carolina	Hawkins Field	16-7	Atwood (1–0)	Christiani (1-1)		476	11-4	1-1
16	March 16	#6 South Carolina	Hawkins Field	10-4	Cotham (3–0)	Cooper (2-2)		2027	12-4	2–1
17	March 19	Lipscomb	Hawkins Field	12-4	Goodenow (1–0)	Bowling (0–1)		341	13-4	
18	March 21	@ Alabama	Sewell-Thomas Stadium	2-1	Minor (3–1)	Hyatt (2-2)		4281	14-4	3–1
19	March 22	@ Alabama	Sewell-Thomas Stadium	9-7	Graham (2–1)	Cotham (3–1)	Copeland (2)	4310	14-5	3–2
20	March 23	@ Alabama	Sewell-Thomas Stadium	10-3	Phares (1-1)	Hill (1-1)		3999	14-6	3-3
21	March 25	Belmont	Hawkins Field	7-3	Jacobson (1–2)	Woods (0–1)	Hayes (1)	679	15-6	
22	March 26	MTSU	Hawkins Field	12-10 (12)	Hill (2–1)	Coley (0–1)		2342	16-6	
--	March 28	Arkansas	Hawkins Field	Postponed (rain)						
--	March 29	Arkansas	Hawkins Field	Suspended (curfew)						
23	March 30	Arkansas	Hawkins Field	6-5 (12)	Hill (3–1)	Richards (1–2)		1320	17-6	4–3
24	March 30	Arkansas	Hawkins Field	6-2 (7)	Cotham (4–1)	Korbal (0–4)		1521	18-6	5–3
--	March 30	Arkansas	Hawkins Field	Canceled (rain)						
25	April 1	Southeast Missouri	Hawkins Field	12-8	Renfrow (2–1)	Hill (3–2)	Kemper (3)	213	18-7	
26	April 2	@ MTSU	Reese Smith Field	6-5	Christiani (2–1)	Smalley (1-1)	Brewer (2)	1264	19-7	
--	April 4	@ #23 Ole Miss	Swayze Field	Postponed (rain)						
27	April 5	@ #23 Ole Miss	Swayze Field	7-6	Bittle (2–1)	Minor (3–2)		?	19-8	5–4
28	April 5	@ #23 Ole Miss	Swayze Field	8-0	Pomeranz (2–1)	Cotham (4–2)		4506	19-9	5-5
29	April 6	@ #23 Ole Miss	Swayze Field	11-6	Satterwhite (3–1)	Jacobson (1–3)		4591	19-10	5–6
30	April 8	Western Kentucky	Hawkins Field	5-1	Christiani (3–1)	Davis (1–5)	Hayes (2)	781	20-10	
31	April 9	Austin Peay	Hawkins Field	8-1	Reid (3–0)	Lykins (0–2)		674	21-10	
32	April 11	@ Mississippi St.	Dudy Noble Field	15-8	Minor (4–2)	Busby (0–3)		2087	22-10	6-6
33	April 12	@ Mississippi St.	Dudy Noble Field	16-0	Cotham (5–2)	Bowen (2–4)		2044	23-10	7–6
34	April 13	@ Mississippi St.	Dudy Noble Field	4-3	Christiani (4–1)	Lalor (1–3)	Brewer (3)	1185	24-10	8–6
35	April 15	@ Lipscomb	Ken Dugan Field	8-1	Hill (4–2)	Piennette (1–2)		1172	2510	
36	April 16	@ Western Kentucky	Nick Denes Field	5-1	Lamm (1–0)	Hightower (3-3)		1056	26-10	
--	April 18	Auburn	Hawkins Field	Suspended (rain)						
37	April 19	Auburn	Hawkins Field	6-3	Dayton (5–1)	Minor (4–3)	Woodall (9)	1719	26-11	8–7
38	April 19	Auburn	Hawkins Field	8-2	Cotham (6–2)	Luckie (4-4)		1321	27-11	9–7
39	April 20	Auburn	Hawkins Field	9-5	Christiani (5–1)	Hendrix (1-1)	Brewer (4)	2427	28-11	10–7
40	April 22	@ Austin Peay	Austin C. Hand Park	9-8	Hayes (1–0)	Hughes (0–2)	Brewer (5)	655	29-11	
41	April 23	@ Belmont	Greer Stadium	10-7	Schwartz (2–0)	Kelley (1–4)	Jacobson (2)	743	30-11	
42	April 25	#21 Kentucky	Hawkins Field	3-2	Brewer (3–0)	Rusin (4–2)		2545	31-11	11–7
43	April 26	#21 Kentucky	Hawkins Field	6-2	Lovett (3–1)	Cotham (6–3)	Albers (1)	2945	31-12	11–8
44	April 27	#21 Kentucky	Hawkins Field	3-1	Dombrowsk (5–0)	Christiani (5–2)	Albers (2)	2127	31-13	11–9
45	May 2	@ Tennessee	Lindsey Nelson Stadium	8-5	Minor (5–3)	Hernandez (1–4)	Jacobson (3)	2176	32-13	12–9
46	May 3	@ Tennessee	Lindsey Nelson Stadium	9-2	Cotham (7–3)	Morgado (5–3)		1571	33-13	13–9
47	May 4	@ Tennessee	Lindsey Nelson Stadium	10-8	Reid (4–0)	Wiltz (3–2)	Jacobson (4)	2501	34-13	14–9
48	May 6	vs. Memphis	Pringles Park	8-0	Hayes (2–0)	Martin (4–3)		923	35-13	
49	May 7	Tennessee Tech	Hawkins Field	7-2	Hill (5–2)	Liberatore (1-1)		1743	36-13	
50	May 9	#9 Georgia	Hawkins Field	13-7	Brewer (4–0)	Holder (7–3)		3200	37-13	15–9
51	May 10	#9 Georgia	Hawkins Field	4-2 (10)	Weaver (4–1)	Brewer (4–1)	Fields (14)	3284	37-14	15–10
52	May 11	#9 Georgia	Hawkins Field	12-10	Moreau (3–2)	Christiani (5–3)	Fields (15)	1758	37-15	15–11
53	May 15	@ Florida	McKethan Stadium	8-6	Edmondson (4–3)	Brewer (4–2)		2656	37-16	15–12
54	May 16	@ Florida	McKethan Stadium	5-4	Locke (5–2)	Cotham (7–4)	Keating (1)	2863	37-17	15–13
55	May 17	@ Florida	McKethan Stadium	13-12 (11)	Mullaney (3–4)	Jacobson (1–4)		2877	37-18	15–14

SEC tournament

#	Date	Opponent	Location	Score	Win	Loss	Save	Attendance	Record
56	May 21	vs. Florida	Regions Field	7-3	Minor (6–3)	Keating (8–1)	Brewer (6)	6027	38–18
57	May 22	vs. #13 LSU	Regions Field	8-2	Martin (5–3)	Cotham (7–5)		?	38–19
58	May 23	vs. #23 South Carolina	Regions Field	7-5	Christiani (6–3)	Cooper (5–6)	Brewer (7)	?	39–19
59	May 24	vs. Ole Miss	Regions Field	7-4	Jacobson (2–4)	McKean (4–1)	Brewer (8)	?	40–19
60	May 24	vs. Ole Miss	Regions Field	8-7	Morgan (4–0)	Hayes (2–1)		3648	40–20

NCAA Regionals

#	Date	Opponent	Location	Score	Win	Loss	Save	Attendance	Record
61	May 30	Oklahoma	Packard Stadium	8-5	Doyle (9–4)	Cotham (7–6)	Anderson (2)	1551	40–21
62	May 31	Stony Brook	Packard Stadium	9-4	Minor (7–3)	Novakowski (7–5)		1101	41–21
63	June 1	Oklahoma	Packard Stadium	11-10	Rocha (4–3)	Brewer (4–3)		1154	41–22

Rankings are based on the USA Today / ESPN coaches' poll standings at the time the game was played.
Links in the first column are to game recaps on VUcommodores.com.

== Rankings ==
Ranking movement
Poll	Pre	Wk 1	Wk 2	Wk 3	Wk 4	Wk 5	Wk 6	Wk 7	Wk 8	Wk 9	Wk 10	Wk 11	Wk 12	Wk 13	Wk 14	Wk 15	Wk 16	Final
USA Today/ESPN Coaches' Poll (Top 25)	6	--	11	12	8	13	8	17	14	13	17	14	13	21	22	--	--	N/R
Baseball America (Top 25)	3	7	7	6	5	9	8	19	17	17	22	18	19	N/R	N/R	N/R	N/R	N/R
Collegiate Baseball (Top 30)	11	9	10	12	9	14	13	23	22	20	20	16	17	N/R	24	27	27	27
NCBWA (Top 30)	8	7	10	9	6	11	6	13	11	10	13	11	13	21	21	25	25	25
Rivals.com (Top 25)	7	5	5	4	4	9	9	17	18	18	22	18	19	N/R	N/R	--	--	N/R
