= 2008 Florida Gators baseball team =

American college baseball season

2008 Florida Gators baseball

Tallahassee Regional, 0–2
- Conference: Southeastern Conference
- Record: 34–24 (17–13 SEC)
- Head coach: Kevin O'Sullivan (1st year)
- Assistant coach: Craig Bell (1st year); Brad Weitzel (1st year)
- Home stadium: Alfred A. McKethan Stadium

2008 Southeastern Conference baseball standings
	Conf.				Overall
Team	W		L	PCT	W		L	PCT
Eastern
No. 2 Georgia ^{x}‍†‍‍^{y}	20	–	9	.690	45	–	25	.643
Florida ‍‍‍^{y}	17	–	13	.567	34	–	24	.586
No. 25 Kentucky ‍‍‍^{y}	16	–	14	.533	44	–	19	.698
Vanderbilt ‍‍‍^{y}	15	–	14	.517	41	–	22	.651
South Carolina ‍‍‍^{y}	15	–	15	.500	40	–	23	.635
Tennessee ‍‍‍	12	–	18	.400	27	–	29	.482
Western
No. 6 LSU ^{x}‍‍‡‍^{y}	18	–	11	.621	49	–	19	.721
Alabama ‍‍‍^{y}	16	–	14	.533	35	–	28	.556
Ole Miss ‍‍‍^{y}	15	–	15	.500	39	–	26	.600
Arkansas ‍‍‍^{y}	14	–	15	.483	34	–	24	.586
Auburn ‍‍‍	11	–	19	.367	28	–	28	.500
Mississippi State ‍‍‍	9	–	21	.300	23	–	33	.411
x – Division champion † – Conference champion ‡ – Tournament champion y – Invited to the NCAA tournament As of June 30, 2008; Rankings from Coaches' Poll

The 2008 Florida Gators baseball team represented the University of Florida in the sport of baseball during the 2008 college baseball season. The Gators competed in Division I of the National Collegiate Athletic Association (NCAA) and the Eastern Division of the Southeastern Conference (SEC). They played their home games at Alfred A. McKethan Stadium, on the university's Gainesville, Florida campus. The team was the first at Florida coached by Kevin O'Sullivan.

== Roster ==
2008 Florida Gators baseball team
Players
Coaches

#	Pos.	Name	B/T	Height	Weight	Year	Home town
2	INF	Josh Adams	R/R	5 ft 10 in (1.78 m)	190 lb (86 kg)	Fr	Jacksonville, FL
34	RHP	Adam Allen	R/R	6 ft 8 in (2.03 m)	206 lb (93 kg)	Fr	Milton, FL
24	INF	Dustin Bamberg	R/R	6 ft 0 in (1.83 m)	200 lb (91 kg)	Sr	Winter Haven, FL
11	INF	Bryson Barber	L/R	6 ft 0 in (1.83 m)	220 lb (100 kg)	Sr	Pensacola, FL
1	OF	Avery Barnes	L/R	5 ft 11 in (1.8 m)	165 lb (75 kg)	Jr	High Springs, FL
12	RHP	Cody Barnes	R/R	5 ft 11 in (1.8 m)	180 lb (82 kg)	Fr	San Mateo, FL
47	C	Brett Bentley	R/R	6 ft 3 in (1.91 m)	215 lb (98 kg)	Jr	Tampa, FL
39	RHP	Michael Branham	R/R	6 ft 3 in (1.91 m)	225 lb (102 kg)	Jr	Tampa, FL
44	RHP	Billy Bullock	R/R	6 ft 6 in (1.98 m)	220 lb (100 kg)	So	Balm, FL
6	OF	Evan Chambers	R/R	5 ft 8 in (1.73 m)	215 lb (98 kg)	Fr	Lakeland, FL
35	LHP	Kevin Chapman	L/L	6 ft 4 in (1.93 m)	215 lb (98 kg)	So	Coral Springs, FL
46	OF	Riley Cooper	R/R	6 ft 3 in (1.91 m)	216 lb (98 kg)	Fr	Clearwater, FL
20	LHP	Tony Davis	S/L	5 ft 9 in (1.75 m)	185 lb (84 kg)	So	Cooper City, FL
17	OF	Matt den Dekker	L/L	6 ft 1 in (1.85 m)	205 lb (93 kg)	So	Fort Lauderdale, FL
25	RHP	Josh Edmondson	R/R	6 ft 1 in (1.85 m)	200 lb (91 kg)	Sr	LaGrange, GA
10	INF	Cole Figueroa	L/R	5 ft 10 in (1.78 m)	180 lb (82 kg)	So	Tallahassee, FL
50	C	Teddy Foster	R/R	6 ft 3 in (1.91 m)	240 lb (109 kg)	Jr	Jacksonville, FL
49	RHP	Clint Franklin	R/R	6 ft 3 in (1.91 m)	195 lb (88 kg)	So	Orlando, FL
16	INF	Chris Freshcorn	R/R	6 ft 2 in (1.88 m)	180 lb (82 kg)	Fr	Tampa, FL
40	OF	Jake Hicks	R/R	6 ft 2 in (1.88 m)	225 lb (102 kg)	So	Molino, FL
27	RHP	Patrick Keating	R/R	6 ft 2 in (1.88 m)	220 lb (100 kg)	Jr	Harrisburg, IL
5	OF	Jared Kubin	R/R	6 ft 3 in (1.91 m)	220 lb (100 kg)	Jr	Oakton, VA
33	LHP	J.K. LaCoste	R/L	6 ft 4 in (1.93 m)	210 lb (95 kg)	Jr	Jacksonville, FL
15	RHP	Travis Lawler	R/R	6 ft 2 in (1.88 m)	170 lb (77 kg)	Fr	College Station, TX
14	LHP	Stephen Locke	R/L	6 ft 2 in (1.88 m)	190 lb (86 kg)	Jr	Tampa, FL
3	INF	Brandon McArthur	R/R	6 ft 1 in (1.85 m)	200 lb (91 kg)	Sr	Seffner, FL
30	RHP	Kyle Mullaney	R/R	6 ft 2 in (1.88 m)	185 lb (84 kg)	So	Jacksonville, FL
4	C	Buddy Munroe	R/R	5 ft 11 in (1.8 m)	185 lb (84 kg)	So	Miami, FL
9	OF	Jonathan Pigott	R/R	6 ft 2 in (1.88 m)	195 lb (88 kg)	So	Ormond Beach, FL
7	INF	Clayton Pisani	R/R	6 ft 1 in (1.85 m)	195 lb (88 kg)	So	Naples, FL
21	RHP	Justin Poovey	R/R	6 ft 0 in (1.83 m)	185 lb (84 kg)	Fr	Granite Falls, NC
41	C	Brett Smith	R/R	6 ft 2 in (1.88 m)	215 lb (98 kg)	Jr	Longwood, FL
23	RHP	Chas Spottswood	R/R	6 ft 4 in (1.93 m)	205 lb (93 kg)	So	Key West, FL
22	C	Hampton Tignor	R/R	6 ft 1 in (1.85 m)	205 lb (93 kg)	So	Sarasota, FL
13	RHP	Tommy Toledo	R/R	6 ft 3 in (1.91 m)	185 lb (84 kg)	Fr	Tampa, FL
8	INF	Jon Townsend	R/R	6 ft 0 in (1.83 m)	200 lb (91 kg)	Sr	London, KY

Head coach

7 Kevin O'Sullivan

Assistant coach(es)

33 Craig Bell
42 Brad Weitzel

Legend

- (C) Team captain
- (S) Suspended
- (I) Ineligible
- Injured
- Current redshirt

Roster

== Schedule ==
2008 Florida Gators baseball game log
Regular season
February

Date	Opponent	Rank	Stadium Site	Score	Win	Loss	Save	Attendance	Overall Record	SEC Record
February 22	Siena		McKethan Stadium	10–7	Bullock (1–0)	Hassett (0–1)	None	3,408	1–0	–
February 23	Siena		McKethan Stadium	4–0	Keating (1–0)	Moberg (0–1)	None	2,857	2–0	–
February 24	Siena		McKethan Stadium	13–6	Toledo (1–0)	Marcellus (0–1)	None	2,823	3–0	–
February 27	Eastern Michigan		McKethan Stadium	15–2	Locke (1–0)	Wendzicki (0–1)	None	–	4–0	–
February 27	Eastern Michigan		McKethan Stadium	16–8	LaCoste (1–0)	Goldschmidt (0–1)	None	2,363	5–0	–
February 29	at No. 14 Miami (FL); Rivalry		Mark Light Stadium; Coral Gables, FL	4–8	Erickson (2–0)	Mullaney (0–1)	None	3,000	5–1	–

March

Date	Opponent	Rank	Stadium Site	Score	Win	Loss	Save	Attendance	Overall Record	SEC Record
March 1	at No. 14 Miami (FL); Rivalry		Mark Light Stadium	5–8	Santana (1–0)	Bullock (1–1)	Gutierrez (3)	3,000	5–2	–
March 2	at No. 14 Miami (FL); Rivalry		Mark Light Stadium	6–2	Franklin (1–0)	Koronis (0–1)	None	3,000	6–2	–
March 4	Campbell		McKethan Stadium	15–3	Edmondson (1–0)	Raisch (0–1)	None	2,293	7–2	–
March 5	Campbell		McKethan Stadium	15–0	Lawler (1–0)	Fish (0–1)	None	2,341	8–2	–
March 8	Brown		McKethan Stadium	2–11	Weidig (1–1)	Bullock (1–2)	None	–	8–3	–
March 8	Brown		McKethan Stadium	8–7	Franklin (2–0)	Hallberg (0–1)	None	2,778	9–3	–
March 9	Brown		McKethan Stadium	13–2	Toledo (2–0)	Kimball (0–1)	None	2,704	10–3	–
March 11	Florida Gulf Coast		McKethan Stadium	2–1	Edmondson (2–0)	Woodworth (2–1)	None	2,539	11–3	–
March 14	Auburn		McKethan Stadium	7–1	Bullock (2–2)	Dayton (1–1)	None	2,477	12–3	1–0
March 15	Auburn		McKethan Stadium	12–8	Keating (2–0)	Shuman (2–1)	Mullaney (1)	3,043	13–3	2–0
March 16	Auburn		McKethan Stadium	6–2	Toledo (3–0)	Luckie (2–2)	Franklin (1)	3,298	14–3	3–0
March 18	No. 3 Florida State; Rivalry		McKethan Stadium	6–1	Locke (2–0)	O'Dell (1–1)	Mullaney (2)	5,719	15–3	–
March 21	at No. 18 Ole Miss		Swayze Field; Oxford, MS	4–5	McKean (2–0)	Franklin (2–1)	None	5,075	15–4	3–1
March 22	at No. 18 Ole Miss		Swayze Field	6–4	Keating (3–0)	Satterwhite (2–1)	Mullaney (3)	5,228	16–4	4–1
March 23	at No. 18 Ole Miss		Swayze Field	10–2	Toledo (4–0)	Baker (1–3)	None	4,163	17–4	5–1
March 25	Jacksonville	No. 22	McKethan Stadium	11–6	Franklin (3–1)	Green (1–1)	None	2,755	18–4	–
March 26	at Jacksonville	No. 22	Sessions Stadium; Jacksonville, FL	5–8	Davis (1–1)	Mullaney (0–2)	Brown (1)	2,312	18–5	–
March 28	LSU	No. 22	McKethan Stadium	8–5	Bullock (3–2)	Bradford (4–3)	Edmondson (1)	4,531	19–5	6–1
March 29	LSU	No. 22	McKethan Stadium	7–1	Keating (4–0)	Verdugo (4–2)	None	4,015	20–5	7–1
March 30	LSU	No. 22	McKethan Stadium	3–6	Bradford (5–3)	Toledo (4–1)	None	3,290	20–6	7–2

April

Date	Opponent	Rank	Stadium Site	Score	Win	Loss	Save	Attendance	Overall Record	SEC Record
April 1	vs. No. 2 Florida State; Rivalry	No. 17	Baseball Grounds; Jacksonville, FL	2–10	Strauss (3–0)	Locke (2–1)	None	7,215	20–7	–
April 2	North Florida	No. 17	McKethan Stadium	10-11^{10}	Pryor (3–3)	Franklin (3–2)	Stohr (7)	2,943	20–8	–
April 5	at Tennessee	No. 17	Lindsey Nelson Stadium; Knoxville, TN	4–5	Hernandez (1–1)	Edmondson (2–1)	Wiltz (3)	–	20–9	7–3
April 5	at Tennessee	No. 17	Lindsey Nelson Stadium	6–12	Rosas (2–1)	Toledo (4–2)	None	2,548	20–10	7–4
April 6	at Tennessee	No. 17	Lindsey Nelson Stadium	7–2^{7}	Keating (5–0)	Crnkovich (4–3)	Locke (1)	2,775	21–10	8–4
April 8	North Florida	No. 24	McKethan Stadium	5–3	Edmondson (3–1)	Pryor (3–2)	None	3,153	22–10	–
April 9	North Florida	No. 24	McKethan Stadium	3–2	Lawler (2–0)	Turner (0–2)	Franklin (2)	2,617	23–10	–
April 11	Arkansas	No. 24	McKethan Stadium	1–2	Keuchel (3–1)	Edmondson (3–2)	Richards (2)	3,523	23–11	8–5
April 12	Arkansas	No. 24	McKethan Stadium	6–1	Keating (6–0)	Springston (4–2)	Locke (2)	3,525	24–11	9–5
April 13	Arkansas	No. 24	McKethan Stadium	4–10	Wells (3–0)	Toledo (4–3)	None	3,113	24–12	9–6
April 15	at No. 1 Florida State; Rivalry		Dick Howser Stadium; Tallahassee, FL	2–4	Strauss (5–0)	Mullaney (0–3)	None	6,737	24–13	–
April 18	at No. 23 Kentucky		Cliff Hagan Stadium; Lexington, KY	7–11	Albers (6–1)	Locke (2–2)	None	3,036	24–14	9–7
April 19	at No. 23 Kentucky		Cliff Hagan Stadium	13–7	Keating (7–0)	Paxton (3–2)	None	2,703	25–14	10–7
April 20	at No. 23 Kentucky		Cliff Hagan Stadium	2–3^{10}	Green (4–2)	Toledo (4–4)	None	2,499	25–15	10–8
April 25	No. 5 Georgia		McKethan Stadium	4–7	Holder (6–2)	Bullock (3–3)	Fields (12)	3,687	25–16	10–9
April 26	No. 5 Georgia		McKethan Stadium	7–2	Locke (3–2)	Dodson (5–2)	None	3,343	26–16	11–9
April 27	No. 5 Georgia		McKethan Stadium	7–2	Keating (8–0)	Moreau (1–2)	Edmondson (2)	3,271	27–16	12–9

May

Date	Opponent	Rank	Stadium Site	Score	Win	Loss	Save	Attendance	Overall Record	SEC Record
May 2	at No. 15 South Carolina	No. 22	Sarge Frye Field; Columbia, SC	9–3	Bullock (4–3)	Cisco (5–3)	None	4,861	28–16	13–9
May 3	at No. 15 South Carolina	No. 22	Sarge Frye Field	5–6	Atwood (5–2)	Edmondson (3–3)	None	5,136	28–17	13–10
May 4	at No. 15 South Carolina	No. 22	Sarge Frye Field	6–9	Godwin (5–2)	Mullaney (0–4)	Bangs (2)	4,904	28–18	13–11
May 7	Bethune–Cookman	No. 22	McKethan Stadium	11-10	Mullaney (1–4)	Chapman (2–3)	None	2,762	29–18	–
May 9	at Alabama	No. 22	Sewell–Thomas Stadium; Tuscaloosa, AL	6–7	Graham (4–1)	Davis (0–1)	None	4,699	29–19	13–12
May 10	at Alabama	No. 22	Sewell–Thomas Stadium	6–2	Locke (4–2)	Hyatt (3–4)	None	4,545	30–19	14–13
May 11	at Alabama	No. 22	Sewell–Thomas Stadium	7–8	Graham (5–1)	Franklin (3–3)	None	4,204	30–20	14–13
May 13	South Florida		McKethan Stadium	12–2	Mullaney (2–4)	Kaufman (3–3)	None	2,668	31–20	–
May 15	No. 17 Vanderbilt		McKethan Stadium	8–6	Edmondson (4–3)	Brewer (4–2)	None	2,656	32–20	15–13
May 16	No. 17 Vanderbilt		McKethan Stadium	5–4	Locke (5–2)	Cotham (7–4)	Keating (1)	2,863	33–20	16–13
May 17	No. 17 Vanderbilt		McKethan Stadium	13-12^{11}	Mullaney (3–4)	Jacobson (1–4)	None	2,877	34–20	17–13

Post-season
SEC Tournament

Date	Opponent	Rank	Stadium Site	Score	Win	Loss	Save	Attendance	Overall Record	SECT Record
May 21	vs. Vanderbilt	No. 17	Regions Park; Hoover, AL	3–7	Minor (6–3)	Keating (8–1)	Brewer (6)	6,027	34–21	0–1
May 22	vs. No. 19 South Carolina	No. 17	Regions Park	3–11	Godwin (7–3)	Bullock (4–4)	Cisco (1)	5,894	34–22	0–2

NCAA tournament: Tallahassee Regional

Date	Opponent	Rank	Stadium Site	Score	Win	Loss	Save	Attendance	Overall Record	Regional Record
May 29	vs. Tulane		Dick Howser Stadium	4–7	Pepitone (4–1)	Bullock (4–5)	Segedin (5)	3,609	34–23	0–1
May 30	at No. 3 Florida State		Dick Howser Stadium	11-17	Villanueva (7–2)	Davis (0–2)	None	4,442	34–24	0–2

Rankings from Collegiate Baseball. All times Eastern. Retrieved from FloridaGators.com

== See also ==
- Florida Gators
- List of Florida Gators baseball players
