= 2008 Southeastern Conference baseball tournament =

- Teams: 8
- Format: Double elimination with flipped brackets
- Finals site: Regions Park; Hoover, Alabama
- Champions: LSU (7th title)
- Winning coach: Paul Mainieri (1st title)
- MVP: Blake Dean (LSU)
- Attendance: 124,139

2008 Southeastern Conference baseball standings
| | Conf. | | | | Overall |
| Team | W | | L | PCT | W | | L | PCT |
|---|---|---|---|---|---|---|---|---|
Eastern
| No. 2 Georgia ^{x}‍†‍‍^{y} | 20 | – | 9 | .690 | 45 | – | 25 | .643 |
| Florida ‍‍‍^{y} | 17 | – | 13 | .567 | 34 | – | 24 | .586 |
| No. 25 Kentucky ‍‍‍^{y} | 16 | – | 14 | .533 | 44 | – | 19 | .698 |
| Vanderbilt ‍‍‍^{y} | 15 | – | 14 | .517 | 41 | – | 22 | .651 |
| South Carolina ‍‍‍^{y} | 15 | – | 15 | .500 | 40 | – | 23 | .635 |
| Tennessee ‍‍‍ | 12 | – | 18 | .400 | 27 | – | 29 | .482 |
Western
| No. 6 LSU ^{x}‍‍‡‍^{y} | 18 | – | 11 | .621 | 49 | – | 19 | .721 |
| Alabama ‍‍‍^{y} | 16 | – | 14 | .533 | 35 | – | 28 | .556 |
| Ole Miss ‍‍‍^{y} | 15 | – | 15 | .500 | 39 | – | 26 | .600 |
| Arkansas ‍‍‍^{y} | 14 | – | 15 | .483 | 34 | – | 24 | .586 |
| Auburn ‍‍‍ | 11 | – | 19 | .367 | 28 | – | 28 | .500 |
| Mississippi State ‍‍‍ | 9 | – | 21 | .300 | 23 | – | 33 | .411 |
x – Division champion † – Conference champion ‡ – Tournament champion y – Invited to the NCAA tournament As of June 30, 2008; Rankings from Coaches' Poll

The 2008 Southeastern Conference baseball tournament was held at Regions Park in Hoover, AL from May 21 through 25. LSU won the tournament and earned the Southeastern Conference's automatic bid to the 2008 NCAA Division I baseball tournament.

== Regular season results ==
The top eight teams (based on conference results) from the conference earned invites to the tournament.

Eastern Division
| Team | W | L | T | Pct | GB | Seed |
|---|---|---|---|---|---|---|
| Georgia | 20 | 9 | 1 | .683 | -- | 1 |
| Florida | 17 | 13 | 0 | .567 | 3.5 | 3 |
| Kentucky | 16 | 14 | 0 | .533 | 4.5 | 4 |
| Vanderbilt | 15 | 14 | 0 | .517 | 5.0 | 6 |
| South Carolina | 15 | 15 | 0 | .500 | 5.5 | 7 |
| Tennessee | 12 | 18 | 0 | .400 | 8.5 | -- |

Western Division
| Team | W | L | T | Pct | GB | Seed |
|---|---|---|---|---|---|---|
| LSU | 18 | 11 | 1 | .617 | -- | 2 |
| Alabama | 16 | 14 | 0 | .533 | 2.5 | 5 |
| Ole Miss | 15 | 15 | 0 | .500 | 3.5 | 8 |
| Arkansas | 14 | 15 | 0 | .483 | 4.0 | -- |
| Auburn | 11 | 19 | 0 | .367 | 7.5 | -- |
| Mississippi State | 9 | 21 | 0 | .300 | 9.5 | -- |

== Format ==
The 2008 tournament will feature a "flipped bracket" for the first time. This means that after two days of play the undefeated team from each bracket will move into the other bracket. This reduces the number of rematches teams will have to play in order to win the tournament.

== Tournament ==
First round
7 | South Carolina | 4*
2 | LSU | 5*
6 | Vanderbilt | 7
3 | Florida | 3
7 | South Carolina | 11
3 | Florida | 3
8 | Ole Miss | 4
1 | Georgia | 1
5 | Alabama | 3
4 | Kentucky | 9
1 | Georgia | 2
5 | Alabama | 5

Second round
2 | LSU | 8
6 | Vanderbilt | 2
7 | South Carolina | 5
6 | Vanderbilt | 7
8 | Ole Miss | 8
4 | Kentucky | 7
5 | Alabama | 13
4 | Kentucky | 4

Semifinals
8 | Ole Miss | 4 | 8
6 | Vanderbilt | 7 | 7
2 | LSU | 12 | -
5 | Alabama | 8 | -

Finals
2 | LSU | 8
8 | Ole Miss | 2

- * Game went into extra innings.
- Tennessee, Arkansas, Mississippi State, and Auburn did not make the tournament.

== All-Tournament Team ==
| Position | Player | School |
|---|---|---|
| 1B | Matt Clark | LSU |
| 1B | Andrew Giobbi | Vanderbilt |
| 2B | Ryan Schimpf | LSU |
| 3B | Chris McClendon | Kentucky |
| SS | Ryan Flaherty | Vanderbilt |
| C | Alex Avila | Alabama |
| OF | Michael Guerrero | Ole Miss |
| OF | Jordan Henry | Ole Miss |
| OF | Kent Matthes | Alabama |
| OF | Sawyer Carroll | Kentucky |
| DH | Blake Dean | LSU |
| P | Lance Lynn | Ole Miss |
| P | Blake Martin | LSU |
| P | Austin Hyatt | Alabama |
| MVP | Blake Dean | LSU |

== See also ==
- College World Series
- NCAA Division I Baseball Championship
- Southeastern Conference baseball tournament
