= Alex Box Stadium =

Former baseball stadium in Baton Rouge, Louisiana

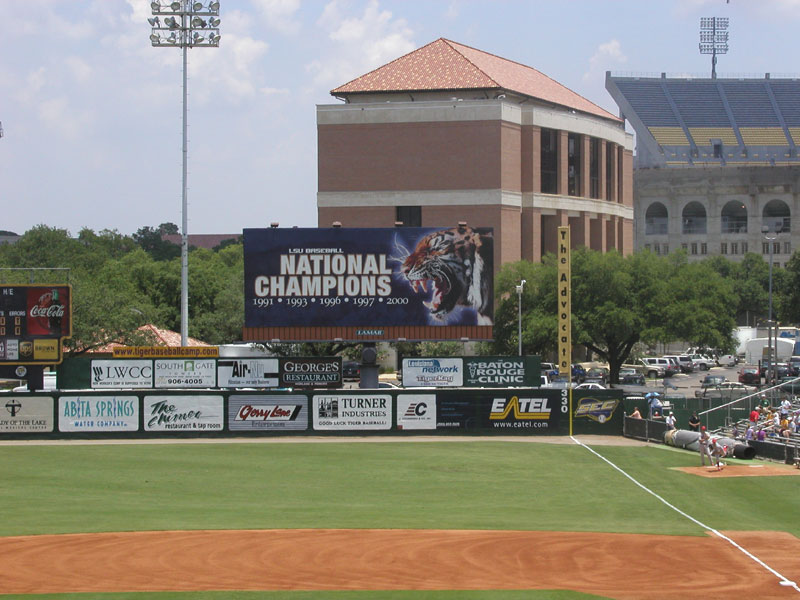
- Interactive map of Alex Box Stadium
- Former names: LSU Diamond or LSU Varsity Baseball Field (1938–1943)
- Location: Skip Bertman Drive; Baton Rouge, Louisiana 70803; United States
- Coordinates: 30.4121°N 91.1877°W
- Owner: Louisiana State University
- Operator: LSU Athletics Department
- Capacity: 10,718
- Surface: natural grass
- Field size: Foul Lines: 330 ft. Power Alleys: 365 ft. Center Field: 405 ft. Outfield Fence Height: 10 ft. Center Field Fence Height: 15 ft.

Construction
- Opened: March 12, 1938
- Closed: 2008
- Demolished: 2010
- Cost: $50,000 (1938)

Tenants
- LSU Tigers baseball (NCAA) (1938–2008); New York Giants (NL) (spring training) (1938–1939); Baton Rouge Cougars (GSL) (1976)

Alex Box Stadium, pronounced Alec Box Stadium, was a baseball stadium in Baton Rouge, Louisiana, United States. It was the home field of the LSU Tigers baseball team. The stadium was located across the street from Tiger Stadium, which is visible in right field. It was most notable for The Intimidator, a large billboard behind the right-field fence featuring the eight years in which LSU won the College World Series.

== History ==
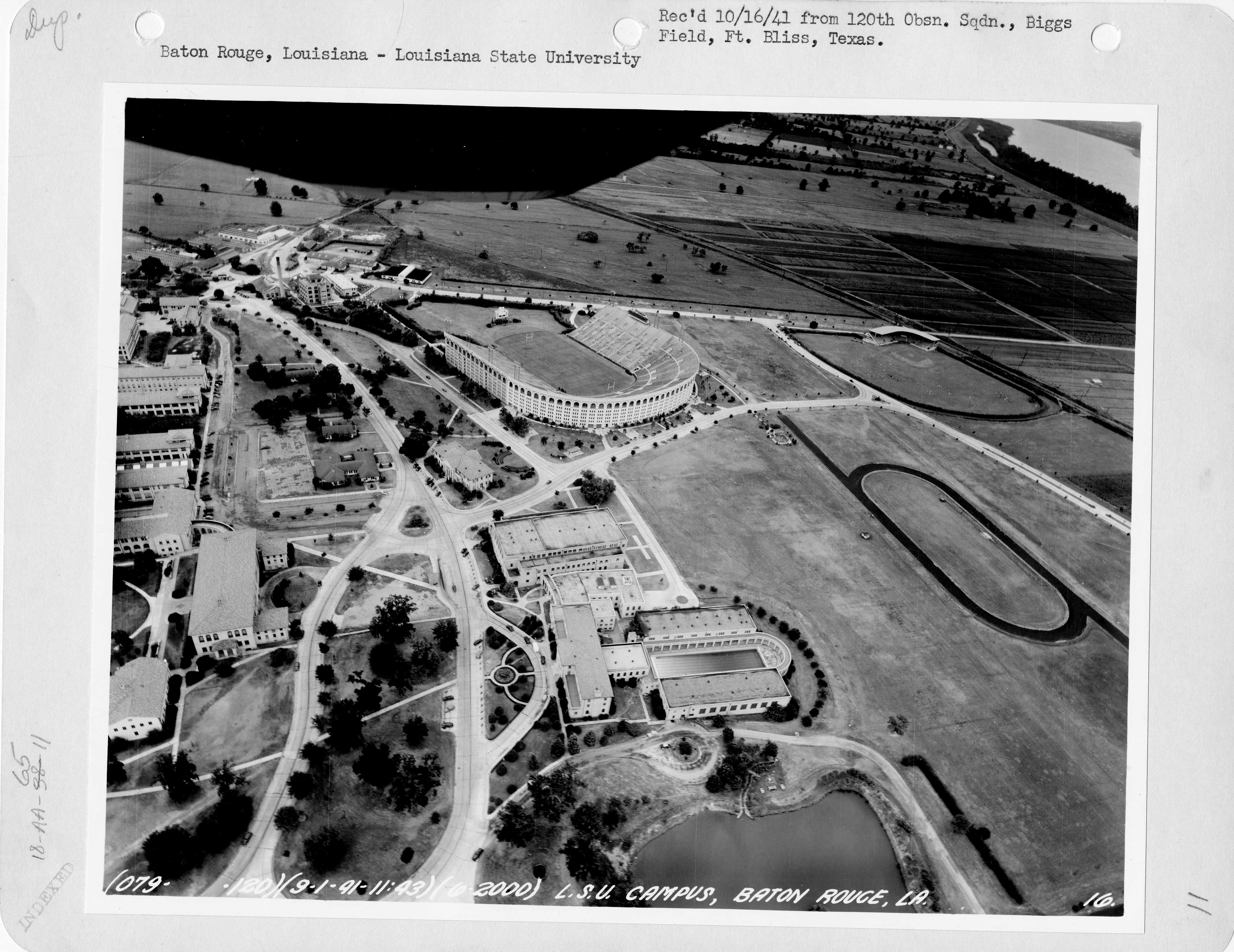
Aerial photograph of Alex Box Stadium, 1941

LSU constructed the ballpark at a cost of $50,000 in 1938.

The New York Giants held spring training at the ballpark in 1938 and 1939. LSU dedicated the new field and the Giants played the first baseball game at the park on March 12, 1938, defeating the Philadelphia Phillies 6-5.

The first LSU game was March 21, 1938. LSU led Minnesota, 4–2, after three innings when the game was halted due to rain. The first official LSU Game at the stadium was March 24, 1938, when Minnesota defeated LSU, 6–5.

Alex Box was home to the Baton Rouge Red Sticks in the Evangeline Baseball League from 1946 to 1955.

The final regular season series at Alex Box Stadium was played between LSU and Mississippi State University in 2008. At the time, it appeared this would be the last series ever at Alex Box Stadium; however, LSU was selected to host a regional in the NCAA Tournament (which it won), and subsequently hosted a Super Regional as the #7 national seed.

It appeared that Alex Box stadium would close on a sour note for the Tigers, as LSU dropped Game 1 to UC Irvine 11–5, and in Game 2, LSU was three outs away from elimination, trailing 7–4 in the ninth inning. However, UC Irvine was unable to close out the LSU Tigers and LSU came from behind to win the game 9–7.

The stadium was thus given one final chance to close on a high note, which it did in Game 3 of the Super Regional played on June 9, 2008, as LSU defeated UC Irvine 21–7. As a result of the victory, LSU won the Baton Rouge Super Regional two games to one and advanced to the College World Series in Omaha, Nebraska. In the final play at the stadium, Tyler Hoechlin hit a grounder to pitcher Anthony Ranaudo, who threw to first baseman Buzzy Haydel for the final out.

The stadium was dismantled, and its remnants sold to fans.

It was replaced with a new stadium 200 yards to the south named Alex Box Stadium, Skip Bertman Field. Both structures were named for Simeon Alex Box, an LSU letterman (1942) who was killed in North Africa during World War II. The stadium was called LSU Diamond or LSU Varsity Baseball Field when it first opened.

== Tournaments Hosted ==
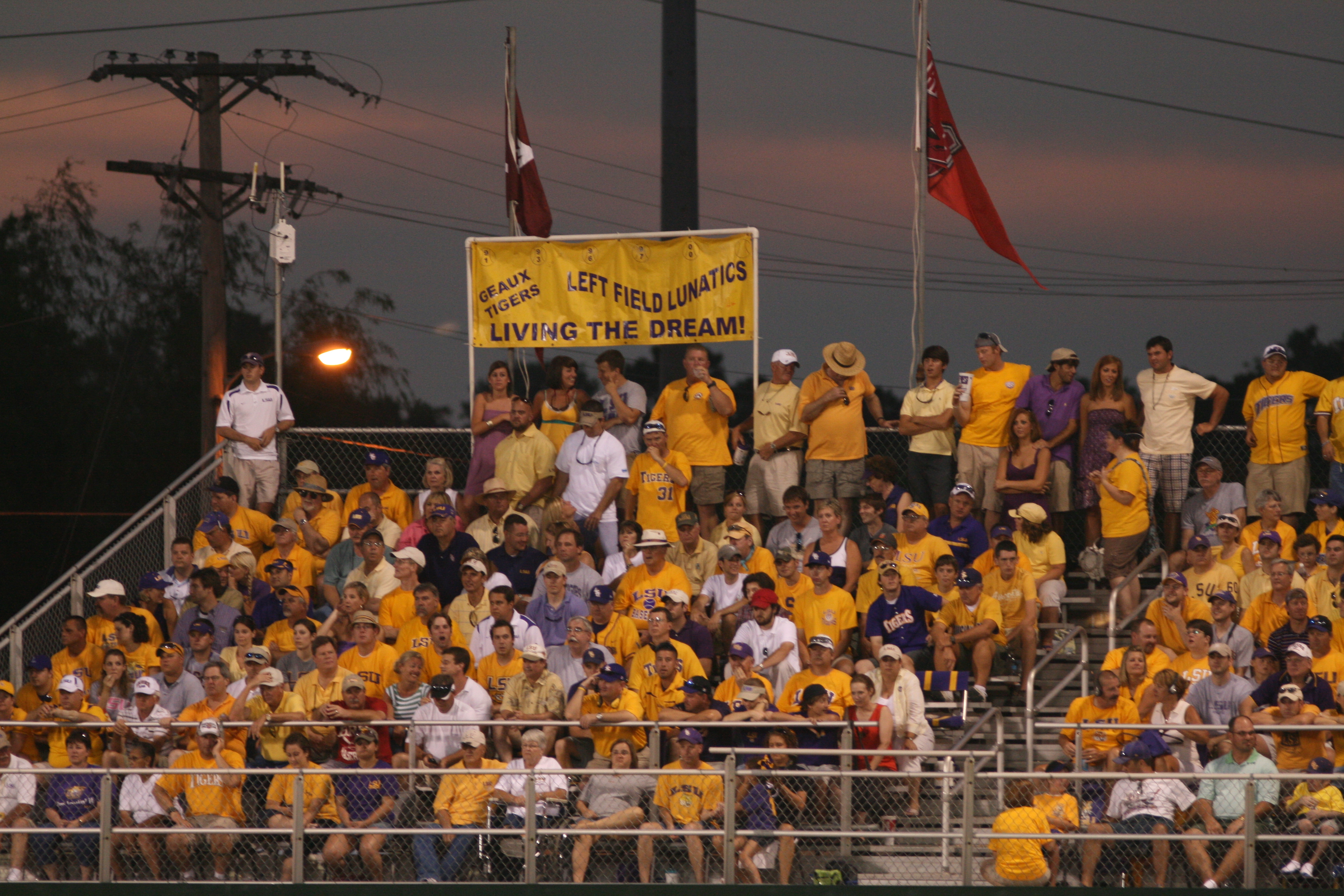
LSU fans enjoyed one final regional in Alex Box Stadium during the 2008 NCAA tournament.

NCAA Regional Tournaments (18): 1986, 1990, 1991, 1992, 1993, 1994, 1995, 1996, 1997, 1998, 1999, 2000, 2001, 2002, 2003, 2004, 2005, 2008
NCAA Super Regional Series (4): 2000, 2003, 2004, 2008
SEC Tournaments (4): 1985, 1986, 1991, 1993

ABCA Hall of Fame Tournament (1): 1991

== LSU record in Alex Box Stadium (1984–2008) ==
Year	Games	W-L-T	Win Percentage
1984	31	23-8	.742
1985	34	31-3	.912
1986	43	38-5	.884
1987	35	30-5	.857
1988	33	27-6	.818
1989	36	31-5	.861
1990	37	32-5	.865
1991	43	33-10	.767
1992	38	30-8	.789
1993	43	34-8-1	.802
1994	35	28-7	.800
1995	36	28-8	.777
1996	39	32-7	.821
1997	40	36-4	.900
1998	35	32-3	.914
1999	38	27-11	.711
2000	39	28-11	.718
2001	37	27-10	.730
2002	36	28-8	.778
2003	39	30-8-1	.782
2004	36	27-9	.750
2005	36	23-13	.639
2006	38	26-12	.684
2007	35	20-14-1	.586
2008	40	31-9-1	.768
Totals	932	732-197-4	.787
