= Alfred A. McKethan Stadium =

Baseball park at University of Florida

- "The Mac"

- Location in Florida Location in the United States
- Full name: Alfred A. McKethan Stadium at Perry Field
- Former names: Perry Field (1949–1988)
- Address: 2190 Stadium Road
- Location: Gainesville, Florida, 32611
- Coordinates: 29°38′58″N 82°21′12″W
- Owner: University of Florida
- Operator: University Athletic Association
- Seating type: 2,408 grandstand chairback 2,692 grandstand bleacher 400 outfield bleacher
- Capacity: 5,500 (2007–2020); 5,000 (1998–2006); 4,300 (1996–1997); 3,300 (1988–1995)
- Type: Stadium
- Event: Baseball
- Surface: Grass
- Scoreboard: Daktronics
- Record attendance: 6,244
- Field size: LF: 326 ft (99.4 m); LC: 365 ft (111.3 m); CF: 400 ft (121.9 m); RC: 375 ft (114.3 m); RF: 321 ft (97.8 m)

Construction
- Groundbreaking: 1987; 39 years ago
- Built: 1988; 38 years ago
- Opened: 1949; 77 years ago (field); 1988; 38 years ago (stadium)
- Demolished: 2020; 6 years ago
- Cost: $16.5 million

Tenant
- Florida Gators baseball (NCAA) 1949–2020

Website
- Alfred A. McKethan Stadium

Alfred A. McKethan Stadium at Perry Field was the college baseball stadium of the University of Florida, serving as the home field for the Florida Gators baseball team until being replaced by Condron Ballpark in 2020. McKethan Stadium was located on the university's Gainesville, Florida campus, in close proximity to the university's indoor sports arena, the Stephen C. O'Connell Center, and its football stadium, Ben Hill Griffin Stadium.

== Namesakes ==
The stadium facility was named for Alfred A. McKethan, a University of Florida alumnus and successful Florida banker, businessman, and politician who contributed significant funds for the reconstruction and expansion of the stadium. McKethan donated the equivalent of $800,000 for the reconstruction and improvement of the stadium in the 1980s and 1990s.

The playing field was named for Carl E. "Tootie" Perry, a former Florida Gators football player who was the Gators' first All-Southern selection in 1920 and 1921 and team captain in 1921. Perry's family formerly owned the land on which the baseball stadium was built, and donated the land to the university.

== History ==
In the earliest years of baseball at the University of Florida, club teams played at a field in downtown Gainesville's Porters Community. In 1911, the team moved on campus to Fleming Field, where the northern endzone of Ben Hill Griffin Stadium stands today. The varsity team was founded in 1912 and continued to play at Fleming Field through 1948. Eventually, an expansion to the football stadium forced the team to move 500 yards southwest to Perry Field.

Wanting to improve college baseball facilities in the state of Florida, New York Yankees owner George Steinbrenner provided funds for the university to install lights at Perry Field in 1977. Perry Field went on to host three exhibitions (in 1977, 1981, and 1987) where the Gators faced the Yankees. The most memorable of these was the March 23, 1977 contest, where an overflowing crowd of 3,820 saw the Gators mount a valiant effort in a 10-9 defeat.

Perry Field was further improved in 1981 with a $10,000 donation by former catcher Tom Shannon. A home team dugout, training room, and storage area were added to the facility. A notorious hill in left field, which rose 30 feet to the wall, proved an imposing obstacle to visiting outfielders.

Funded by Alfred McKethan, other athletic boosters, and the state government, a $2.4-million concrete stadium was constructed in 1987 to replace the existing bleachers at Perry Field for the 1988 season. The stadium was dedicated in McKethan's honor on February 23, 1988, before a 3-2 victory by the Gators over Miami. Initially seating 3,300 spectators (2,500 grandstand, 800 chairback), capacity was increased to 4,300 in the summer of 1995 with an expansion to the grandstand. A further $650,000 worth of renovations the following year improved the plaza surrounding the grandstand as well as the press box. New grass was installed in 1997 while 700 more seats were added along the left field line.

The final major renovation to McKethan Stadium came in 2006, when $13 million was spent to improve the stadium and the adjacent Lemerand Athletic Center. The project incorporated a new baseball-specific building, the roof of which became the Don and Irene Dizney Plaza, a location where fans could overlook the field from above the foul territory in left field. Additional seating was also built, including 400 bleacher seats in left field, increasing the capacity to 5,500. A high-resolution videoboard was added beyond right field in 2012.

The Gators finished 33 seasons at McKethan Stadium after hosting 1,214 games of baseball, with 911 victories to just 303 defeats (.750). The stadium also hosted the 1989 SEC tournament, 16 NCAA Regionals, and nine NCAA Super Regionals.

NCAA tournament at McKethan Stadium
**Regionals**	1989, **1991**, 1992, **1996**, **1998**, 2002, **2005**, **2009**, **2010**, **2011**, **2012**, 2014, **2015**, **2016**, **2017**, **2018**
**Super Regionals**	**2005**, 2009, **2010**, **2011**, **2012**, **2015**, **2016**, **2017**, **2018**

Won by Florida in bold

Head Coaches at McKethan Stadium
Head coach	Seasons	First	Last	W	L	%
Joe Arnold	7	1988	1994	194	68	.740
Andy Lopez	7	1995	2001	193	63	.754
Pat McMahon	6	2002	2007	158	68	.699
Kevin O'Sullivan	13	2008	2020	366	104	.779

== Facilities ==
The stadium facility was a concrete structure that seated approximately 5,500 fans, including 2,408 chairback seats around the inner diamond. The asymmetrical stadium seated about two-thirds of its spectators left of home plate. Outfield seating was limited to a section of bleachers in left field. Visible past left field was the O'Connell Center and Ben Hill Griffin Stadium behind it, while the view beyond right field was of the Graham Woods Conservation Area. The courtyard-like plaza surrounding the grandstand could host food trucks and merchandise stalls, while permanent concession facilities and restrooms were built under the grandstands themselves. A south entrance provided entry to the right field stands while a north entrance gave access to the left field stands (ticket booths were available at both entrances). Facilities included a training center, video room, staff offices, and locker rooms for both home and visiting teams. The Gators' bullpen and batting cages were enclosed, under the Dizney Plaza.

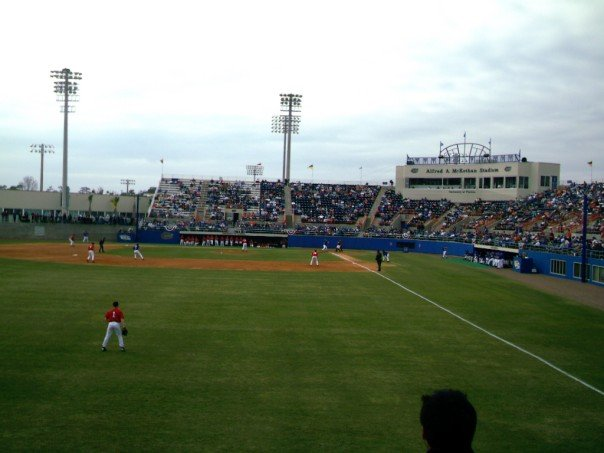
McKethan Stadium seen from the outfield bleachers

McKethan Stadium Pressbox

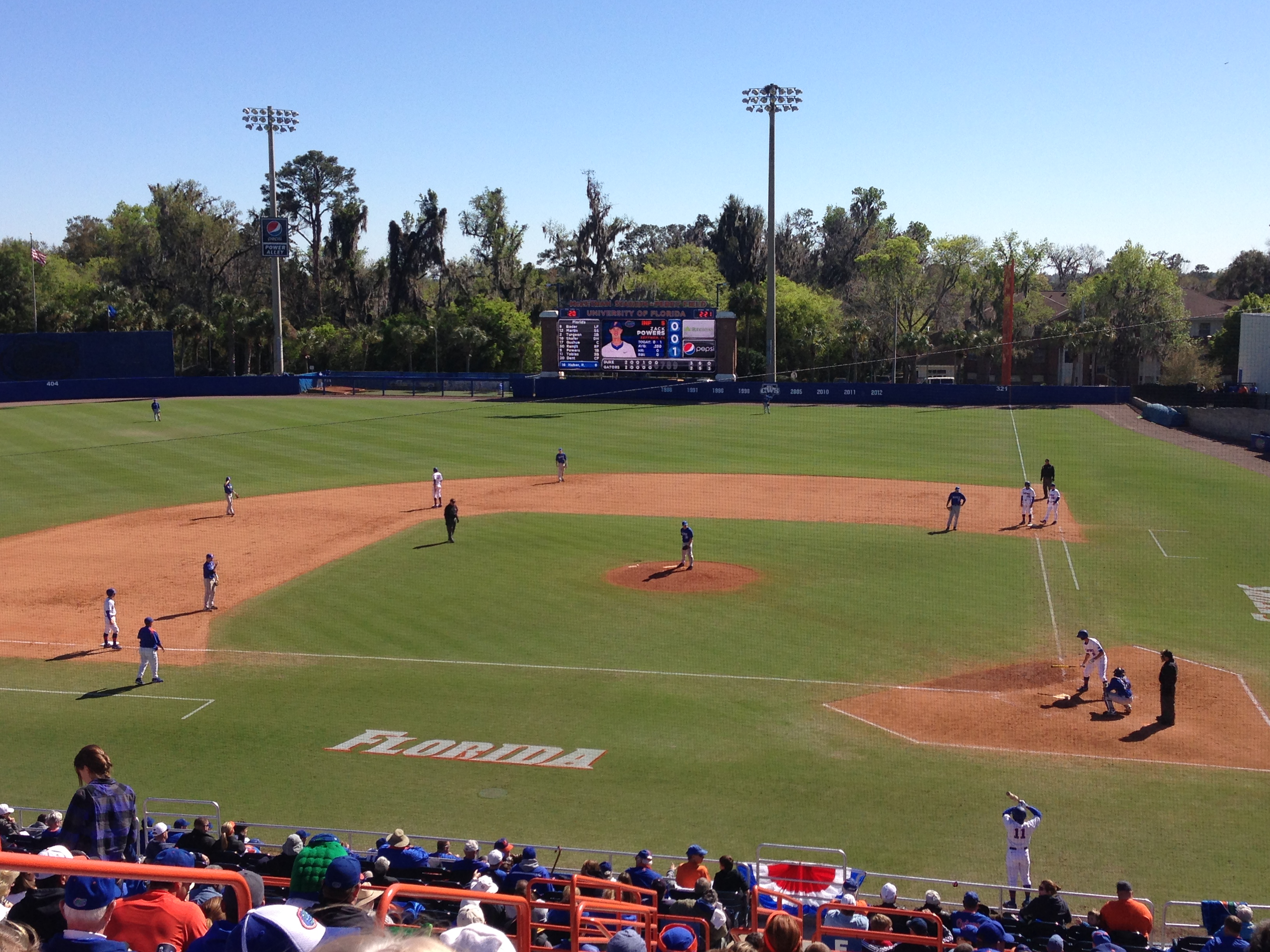
The Gators in action on February 17, 2013

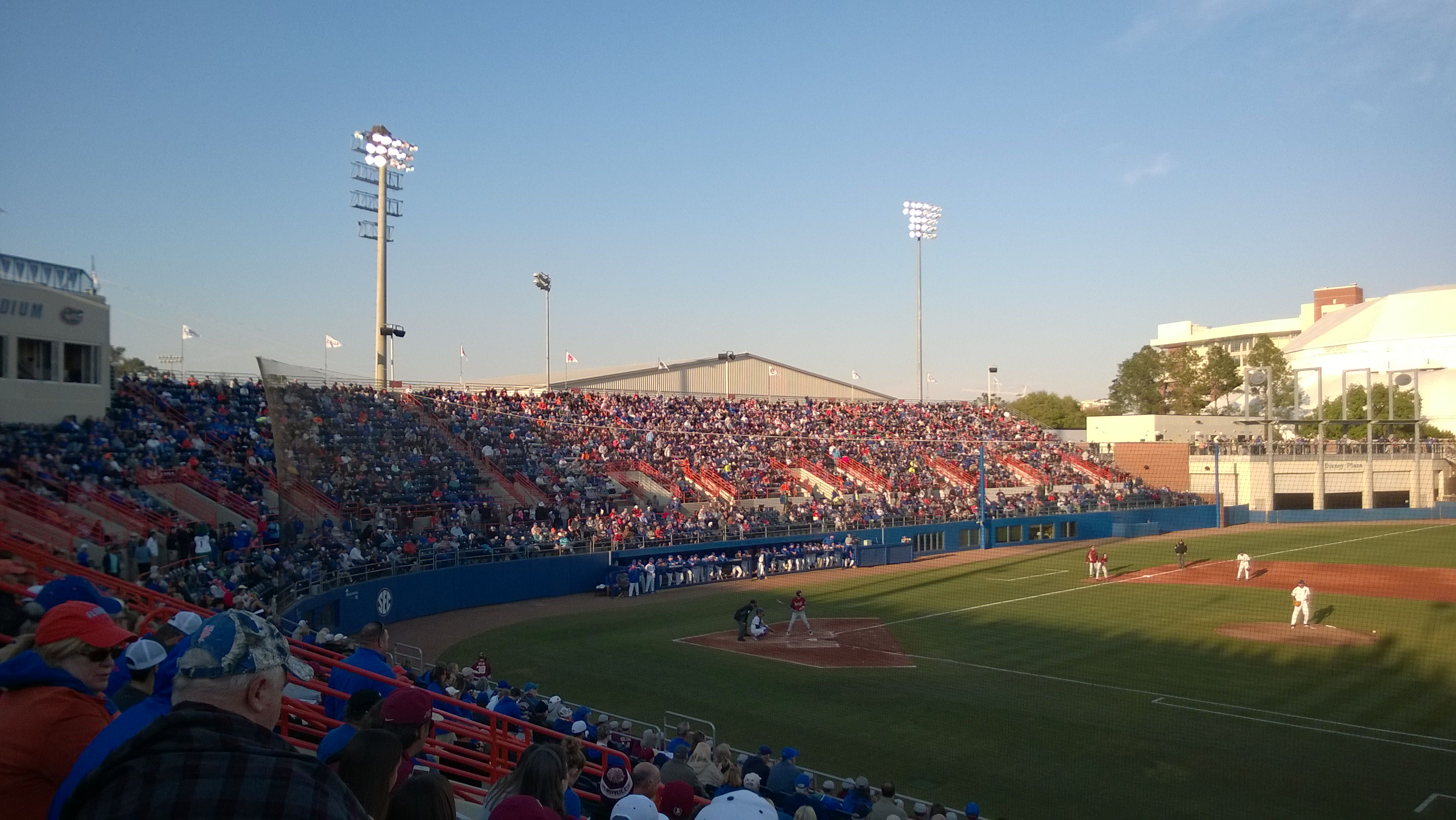
A sell-out crowd watches the Gators face the Florida State Seminoles in 2018

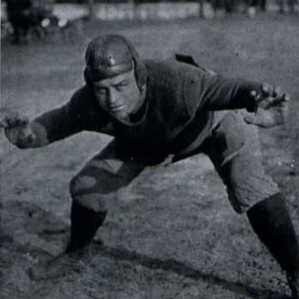
Tootie Perry, namesake of Perry Field

== Attendance and records ==
In 33 seasons of baseball, McKethan Stadium hosted over 3.2 million fans for Florida home games. Support was greatest in the ballpark's final 11 seasons, with an average of over 3,000 spectators per game each year. Ultimately, 61 contests drew a crowd of 5,000 or greater. Attendance at McKethan Stadium peaked in 2018, the year following Florida's first national championship campaign. That season, the Gators ranked ninth among Division I baseball programs in total attendance with 165,551 persons attending 41 games and 14th in average attendance with 4,038 persons per home game. In 21 of its final 23 seasons, McKethan Stadium finished in the top 15 nationally for total attendance.

The record for highest attendance in a single game at McKethan Stadium was set on April 9, 2016; a total of 6,244 spectators watched Mississippi State defeat the Gators 10-4 in the second game of a three-game series. This defeat ended the longest home winning streak in school history, a 29-game run that spanned the 2015 and 2016 campaigns. A season later, the highest total attendance record for a three-game series was made on February 26, 2017; 16,807 tickets were sold for the Gators' sweep of Miami. The best-attended two-game series in the ballpark's history was the 2015 Gainesville Super Regional, when 11,481 fans witnessed Florida sweep Florida State.

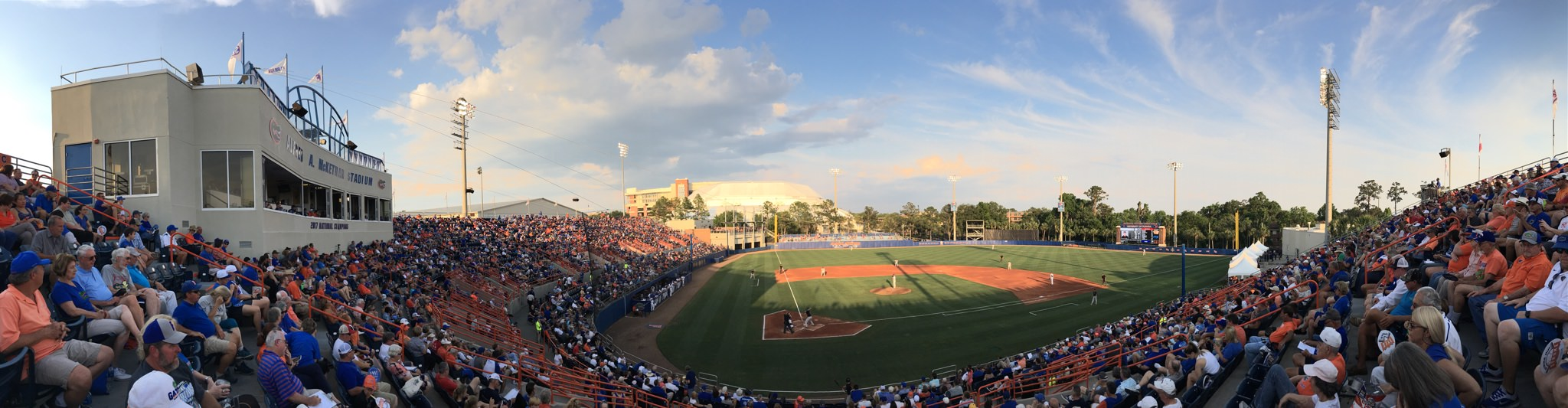
Florida hosting Georgia at McKethan Stadium in 2018

Annual Records
Season	Head coach	W	L	%	Att.	Average
1988	Joe Arnold	27	6	.818	26,020	788
1989	Joe Arnold	31	11	.738	72,600	1,729
1990	Joe Arnold	22	14	.611	43,950	1,221
1991	Joe Arnold	32	6	.842	58,634	1,543
1992	Joe Arnold	30	11	.732	88,312	2,154
1993	Joe Arnold	23	12	.657	45,685	1,305
1994	Joe Arnold	29	8	.784	58,883	1,591
1995	Andy Lopez	26	7	.788	57,151	1,732
1996	Andy Lopez	32	7	.821	91,123	2,336
1997	Andy Lopez	27	9	.750	88,539	2,459
1998	Andy Lopez	35	5	.875	105,262	2,632
1999	Andy Lopez	22	14	.611	82,236	2,284
2000	Andy Lopez	25	11	.694	63,385	1,761
2001	Andy Lopez	26	10	.722	53,312	1,481
2002	Pat McMahon	32	9	.780	86,251	2,104
2003	Pat McMahon	31	6	.838	67,033	1,812
2004	Pat McMahon	27	9	.750	80,686	2,241
2005	Pat McMahon	32	11	.744	112,110	2,607
2006	Pat McMahon	19	16	.543	123,022	3,515
2007	Pat McMahon	17	17	.500	106,956	3,146
2008	Kevin O'Sullivan	27	6	.818	96,235	2,916
2009	Kevin O'Sullivan	30	10	.750	119,252	2,981
2010	Kevin O'Sullivan	33	3	.917	126,195	3,505
2011	Kevin O'Sullivan	34	7	.829	153,904	3,754
2012	Kevin O'Sullivan	31	8	.795	153,484	3,935
2013	Kevin O'Sullivan	20	16	.555	126,421	3,512
2014	Kevin O'Sullivan	23	13	.639	115,059	3,196
2015	Kevin O'Sullivan	33	6	.846	138,441	3,550
2016	Kevin O'Sullivan	34	5	.872	154,743	3,968
2017	Kevin O'Sullivan	31	10	.756	156,768	3,824
2018	Kevin O'Sullivan	33	8	.805	165,551	4,038
2019	Kevin O'Sullivan	26	11	.703	141,491	3,824
2020	Kevin O'Sullivan	11	1	.917	47,865	3,989
Total	—	911	303	.750	3,206,559	2,641

== Replacement ==
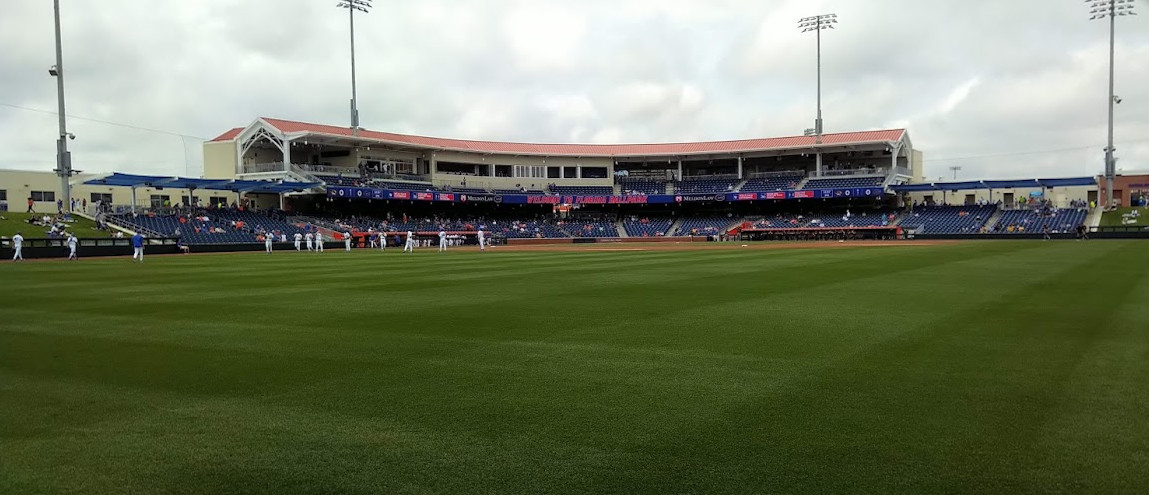
Condron Ballpark at McKethan Field opened for the 2021 season

On October 9, 2017, the University Athletic Association submitted a project plan to the University of Florida outlining a new baseball stadium that was expected to begin construction in September 2018 and be completed by the end of 2019 with a budget of $50 million. Following delays, construction ultimately began February 2019 and concluded in August 2020, with a finished budget of approximately $65 million.

The new stadium increased available chairbacks from 2,408 to 4,000 with 700 club seats and an expandable capacity of about 10,000. The design includes a 360-degree concourse, shade canopy, and open air seated grandstand.

The new facility is located on the Southwest part of campus, adjacent to Pressly Softball Stadium and Dizney Stadium, utilizing 13.63 acres (5.52 ha) of land previously occupied by the University of Florida Institute of Food and Agriculture Sciences (UF/IFAS). UF/IFAS facilities on this property were relocated to a nearby part of campus.

== See also ==
- Buildings at the University of Florida
- Florida Gators
- History of the University of Florida
- List of NCAA Division I baseball venues
- University Athletic Association
