= Swayze Field =

Baseball park at University of Mississippi

Oxford-University Stadium
- Swayze Field
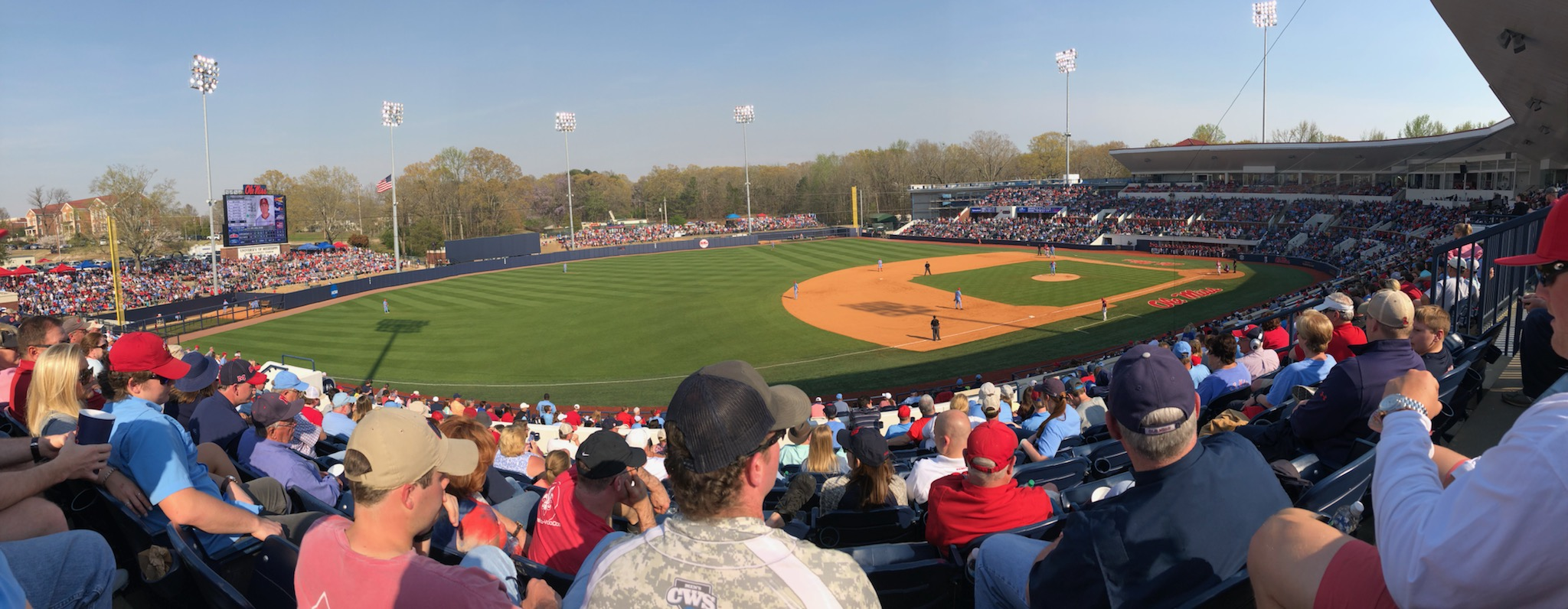
- Ole Miss Baseball vs. Arkansas on March 31, 2018.
- Interactive map of Oxford-University Stadium
- Location: Oxford, Mississippi
- Coordinates: 34°21′43″N 89°31′44″W
- Owner: University of Mississippi
- Operator: University of Mississippi
- Capacity: 12,152
- Surface: Grass
- Record attendance: 12,503 (April 23, 2022 vs. Mississippi State)
- Field size: Left Field: 330 ft (101 m); Alleys: 365 ft (110 m); Center Field: 390 ft (119 m); Right Field: 330 ft (101 m)

Construction
- Opened: March 27, 1988 (expanded 2003, 2009)
- Cost: $3.75 million (Original cost)

Tenant
- Ole Miss Rebels (NCAA) (1988-Present)

Oxford-University Stadium at Swayze Field is the home of the University of Mississippi Rebels college baseball team, the 2022 NCAA National Champions, and is located in Oxford, Mississippi. It is named in honor of Tom Swayze, a former Ole Miss baseball player and coach.

The $3.75 million stadium opened on February 19, 1989, with a double header sweep of Cumberland University. The actual stadium sits on city property off-campus and was built by the City of Oxford, using a 2% Local Tourism Tax on prepared food and alcohol to pay for it.

== Features ==
=== Right field terrace ===
The hill beyond the right field wall was equipped with a seating area in 1993 that sits comfortably between the field and eight tennis courts. This has historically been a section for students. Since the 2000 season the area has undergone many improvements. What began as a gathering place for about 100 students has grown into an area of about 1,000 students per game during conference season. This area however is not counted as part of the stadium.

==== Right field traditions ====
1.) One of the main right field traditions involves the players themselves. After warmups are completed, each inning the outfielders throw the baseball into the right field student section where students write messages on them and then throw the ball back to the outfielders for warm ups the next inning.
2.) The beer shower: Upon an Ole Miss home run or walk off win, the student section jumps to their feet and throws their beverage into the air.

=== Left field terrace ===
For many years there was nothing but trees and a parking lot beyond the left field wall. In 2006, the left field area, known as Oakes Pavilion, was renovated with a new scoreboard equipped with a large video board and the seating areas were upgraded with grills, picnic tables, and a play area for children. The left field area can hold around 1,000 fans and has become one of the more popular areas of the field. It is mainly reserved for the families and non-students.

=== Stadium amenities ===
Below the stands are coach's offices, locker rooms, player's lounge, press area, and a workout area for the pitchers. Along the first base line is a 6,800-square-foot (630 m^{2}) hitting complex. In 2006 a large video board was added that supplies fans with replays during the game.

== Expansion ==
In April 2007, Ole Miss announced that their baseball stadium would undergo an $18.5 million expansion. The expansion was mostly completed in time for the 2009 baseball season. The expansion resulted in an increase of the overall number of seats to just over 6,000 and a total capacity exceeding 8,500. The architect for both the original facility and the expansion was Cooke Douglass Farr Lemons. On June 6, 2009, an Ole Miss record 10,323 were present to watch the Super Regional game vs the University of Virginia (UVA won 4–3).

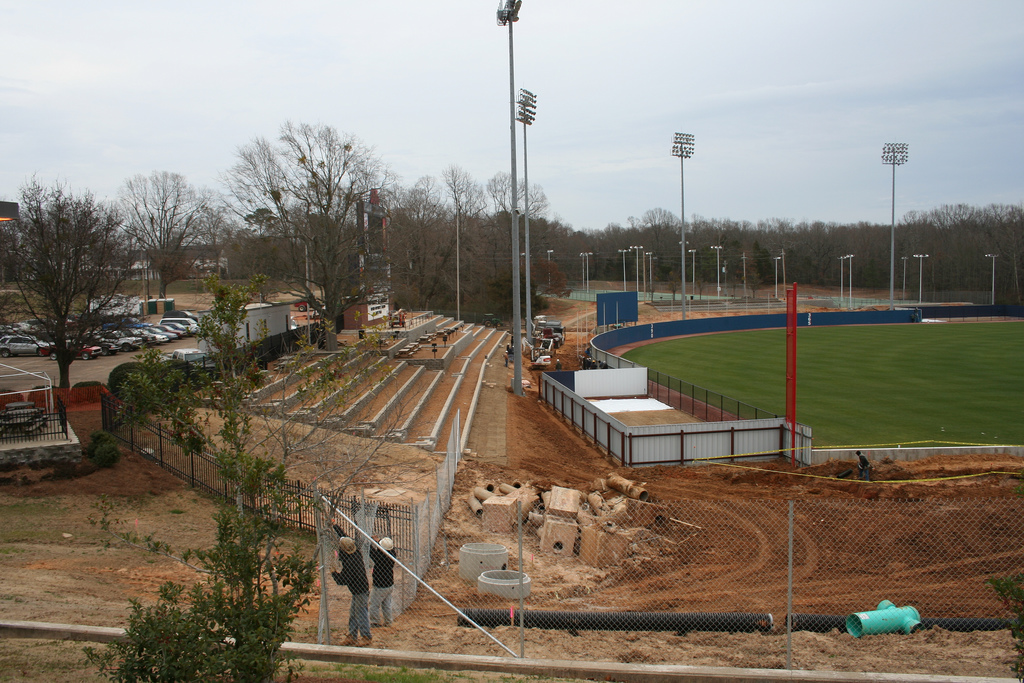
Swayze Field expansion construction.

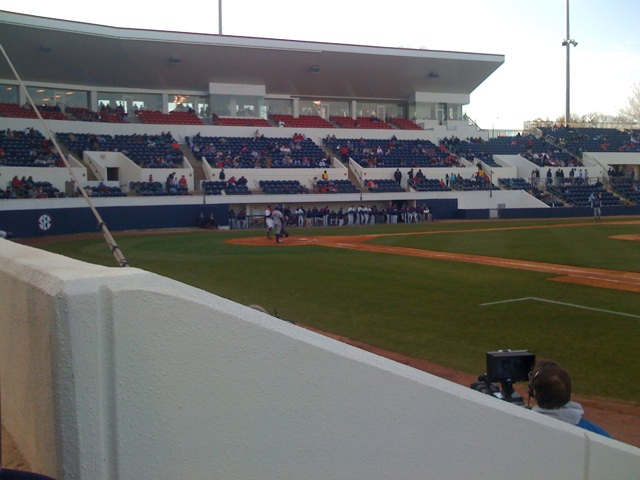
Swayze Field expansion completion.

== Attendance ==
The first Ole Miss game with more than 10,000 fans (10,323) in attendance occurred on June 6, 2009, against Virginia in Super Regional play.

On April 28, 2018, a new attendance record, 12,152, was set on Double Decker Weekend in a game against LSU, which then No.6 Ole Miss won 9–8. This record fell in 2022 during the final game of the Rebels' home series against archrival Mississippi State, when a crowd of 12,503 saw the Rebels fall 7–6 in 11 innings.

In 2013, the Rebels ranked 3rd among Division I baseball programs in attendance, averaging 7,996 per home game.

In 2015, 2016, & 2017, the Rebels ranked 2nd among Division I baseball programs in per game attendance, averaging 8,028, 8,619, & 9,238 per home game, respectively.

=== Stadium attendance in excess of 11,000 ===
Date	Opponent	Attendance	Result	Notes
April 23, 2022	Mississippi State	12,503	Lost 7-6 (11 innings)	Double Decker weekend
April 28, 2018	LSU	12,152	Won 9-8	Double Decker weekend
March 26, 2022	Tennessee	12,134	Lost 10-3	
February 17, 2017	East Carolina	12,117	Won 5-4	Opening Day
April 2, 2019	North Alabama	12,081	Lost 10-6	School Day Game
April 22, 2022	Mississippi State	12,078	Lost 10-7	Double Decker weekend
April 9, 2022	Alabama	12,045	Lost 12-10 (10 innings)	
May 30, 2025	Murray State	11,925	Lost 9-6	2025 Oxford Regional
April 27, 2018	LSU	11,861	Lost 5-2	Double Decker weekend
April 10, 2021	Arkansas	11,857	Won 13-6	2nd game of doubleheader
March 27, 2026	Mississippi State	11,758	Lost 5-4	
April 13, 2013	Alabama	11,729	Won 5-2	First crowd in excess of 11,000
May 31, 2025	Western Kentucky	11,703	Won 8-6	2025 Oxford Regional
February 19, 2022	Charleston Southern	11,621	Won 11-1	
June 1, 2025	Georgia Tech	11,620	Won 11-9	2025 Oxford Regional
June 1, 2025	Murray State	11,617	Won 19-8	2025 Oxford Regional
April 10, 2021	Arkansas	11,524	Lost 7-3	#2 vs #3
April 11, 2026	LSU	11,501	Won 12-2 (7)	
February 18, 2017	East Carolina	11,494	Won 3-2	All-time record set day prior
March 25, 2022	Tennessee	11,337	Lost 12-1	
March 28, 2026	Mississippi State	11,336	Lost 6-1	
April 12, 2022	Murray State	11,331	Won 8-2	
June 2, 2018	Saint Louis	11,304	Won 9-2	Postseason record
April 1, 2017	Mississippi State	11,204	Lost 2-1	
February 18, 2022	Charleston Southern	11,146	Won 9-3	Opening Day
April 5, 2019	Florida	11,026	Won 12-4	Grove Bowl weekend
March 31, 2017	Mississippi State	11,017	Lost 5-3	

== See also ==
- List of NCAA Division I baseball venues
