= 2008 Georgia Bulldogs baseball team =

American college baseball season

2008 Georgia Bulldogs baseball

Southeastern Conference Champions Athens Regional Champions Athens Super Regional Champions

College World Series, Runner-Up
- Conference: Southeastern Conference
- Record: 45–25–1 (20–9–1 SEC)
- Head coach: David Perno (7th season)
- Assistant coaches: Jason Eller; Brady Wiederhold; Justin Holmes (1st season)
- MVP: Gordon Beckham
- Captain: Ryan Peisel
- Home stadium: Foley Field

2008 Southeastern Conference baseball standings
| | Conf. | | | | Overall |
| Team | W | | L | PCT | W | | L | PCT |
|---|---|---|---|---|---|---|---|---|
Eastern
| No. 2 Georgia ^{x}‍†‍‍^{y} | 20 | – | 9 | .690 | 45 | – | 25 | .643 |
| Florida ‍‍‍^{y} | 17 | – | 13 | .567 | 34 | – | 24 | .586 |
| No. 25 Kentucky ‍‍‍^{y} | 16 | – | 14 | .533 | 44 | – | 19 | .698 |
| Vanderbilt ‍‍‍^{y} | 15 | – | 14 | .517 | 41 | – | 22 | .651 |
| South Carolina ‍‍‍^{y} | 15 | – | 15 | .500 | 40 | – | 23 | .635 |
| Tennessee ‍‍‍ | 12 | – | 18 | .400 | 27 | – | 29 | .482 |
Western
| No. 6 LSU ^{x}‍‍‡‍^{y} | 18 | – | 11 | .621 | 49 | – | 19 | .721 |
| Alabama ‍‍‍^{y} | 16 | – | 14 | .533 | 35 | – | 28 | .556 |
| Ole Miss ‍‍‍^{y} | 15 | – | 15 | .500 | 39 | – | 26 | .600 |
| Arkansas ‍‍‍^{y} | 14 | – | 15 | .483 | 34 | – | 24 | .586 |
| Auburn ‍‍‍ | 11 | – | 19 | .367 | 28 | – | 28 | .500 |
| Mississippi State ‍‍‍ | 9 | – | 21 | .300 | 23 | – | 33 | .411 |
x – Division champion † – Conference champion ‡ – Tournament champion y – Invited to the NCAA tournament As of June 30, 2008; Rankings from Coaches' Poll

The 2008 Georgia Bulldogs baseball team represented the University of Georgia in the 2008 NCAA Division I baseball season. The Bulldogs played their home games at Foley Field. The team was coached by David Perno in his 7th season at Georgia.

The Bulldogs lost the College World Series, defeated by the Fresno State Bulldogs in the championship series.

== Roster ==
2008 Georgia Bulldogs roster
| Pitchers: 44 Stephen Brock - Junior; 42 Stephen Dodson - Junior; 18 Justin Earls - Sophomore; 20 Steve Esmonde - Sophomore; 25 Joshua Fields - Senior; 40 Justin Grimm - Freshman; 46 Drew Haggard - Freshman; 16 Brent Hallman - RS Sophomore; 35 Will Harvil - Junior; 45 John Herman - RS Freshman; 17 Trevor Holder - Junior; 8 Jason Leaver - Junior; 12 Nick Montgomery - Senior; 13 Nathan Moreau - Junior; 2 Stephen Ochs - Junior; 37 Evan Tieles - Freshman; 22 Dean Weaver - Sophomore; 33 Ryan Woolley - Sophomore | Infielders: 6 Gordon Beckham - Junior; 1 Jeff Bissell - Freshman; 15 Michael Demperio - Sophomore; 32 Alex McRee - Sophomore; 19 Robbie O'Bryan - RS Freshman; 3 Ryan Peisel - Senior; 33 Rich Poythress - Sophomore; 27 Miles Starr - Junior; 7 David Thomas - Sophomore; Catchers: 36 Jake Crane - Senior; 23 Joey Lewis - Sophomore; 29 Bryce Massanari - Junior; 24 Carson Schilling - Freshman | Outfielders: 11 Lyle Allen - Freshman; 10 Matt Cerione - Sophomore; 5 Adam Fuller - Junior; 30 Matt Olson - Senior; Coaches: 4 David Perno - 7th Season; 9 Jason Eller; 21 Brady Wiederhold; 14 Justin Holmes - 1st Season |

== Schedule ==
2008 Georgia Bulldogs baseball game log
Regular season
February (1–3)

| Date | Opponent | Site/stadium | Score | Overall Record | SEC Record |
|---|---|---|---|---|---|
| February 22 | Arizona | Foley Field • Athens, GA | 9–7 | 1–0 | – |
| February 23 | Arizona | Foley Field • Athens, GA | 1–7 | 1–1 | – |
| February 24 | Arizona | Foley Field • Athens, GA | 8–9 | 1–2 | – |
| February 27 | at Atlanta Braves | Champion Stadium • Lake Buena Vista, FL | 0–8 | 1–2 | – |
| February 29 | vs #12 Oregon State | PGE Park • Portland, OR | 4–6 | 1–3 | – |

March (14–7)

| Date | Opponent | Site/stadium | Score | Overall Record | SEC Record |
|---|---|---|---|---|---|
| March 1 | vs #12 Oregon State | PGE Park • Portland, OR | 10–5 | 2–3 | – |
| March 2 | vs #12 Oregon State | PGE Park • Portland, OR | 4–5 | 2–4 | – |
| March 5 | Jacksonville State | Foley Field • Athens, GA | 19–1 | 3–4 | – |
| March 7 | Memphis | Foley Field • Athens, GA | 8–1 | 4–4 | – |
| March 8 | Memphis | Foley Field • Athens, GA | 8–2 | 5–4 | – |
| March 9 | Memphis | Foley Field • Athens, GA | 6–7 | 5–5 | – |
| March 11 | at #3 Florida State | Mike Martin Field at Dick Howser Stadium • Tallahassee, FL | Cancelled | 5–5 | – |
| March 12 | at #3 Florida State | Mike Martin Field at Dick Howser Stadium • Tallahassee, FL | 13–10 | 6–5 | – |
| March 12 | at #3 Florida State | Mike Martin Field at Dick Howser Stadium • Tallahassee, FL | 3–8 | 6–6 | – |
| March 14 | at #21 Arkansas | Baum–Walker Stadium • Fayetteville, AR | 1–5 | 6–7 | 0–1 |
| March 15 | at #21 Arkansas | Baum–Walker Stadium • Fayetteville, AR | 15–11 | 7–7 | 1–1 |
| March 16 | at #21 Arkansas | Baum–Walker Stadium • Fayetteville, AR | 13–2 | 8–7 | 2–1 |
| March 18 | Western Carolina | Foley Field • Athens, GA | 8–3 | 9–7 | 2–1 |
| March 19 | Alabama A&M | Foley Field • Athens, GA | 18–3 | 10–7 | 2–1 |
| March 21 | Tennessee | Foley Field • Athens, GA | 6–2 | 11–7 | 3–1 |
| March 22 | Tennessee | Foley Field • Athens, GA | 3–2 | 12–7 | 4–1 |
| March 23 | Tennessee | Foley Field • Athens, GA | 3–4 | 12–8 | 4–2 |
| March 25 | at Kennesaw State | Fred Stillwell Stadium • Kennesaw, GA | 12–5 | 13–8 | 4–2 |
| March 26 | Kennesaw State | Foley Field • Athens, GA | 6–8 | 13–9 | 4–2 |
| March 28 | at Mississippi State | Dudy Noble Field • Starkville, MS | 2–3 | 13–10 | 4–3 |
| March 29 | at Mississippi State | Dudy Noble Field • Starkville, MS | 5–1 | 14–10 | 5–3 |
| March 30 | at Mississippi State | Dudy Noble Field • Starkville, MS | 5–3 | 15–10 | 6–3 |

April (14–4–1)

| Date | Opponent | Site/stadium | Score | Overall Record | SEC Record |
|---|---|---|---|---|---|
| April 1 | #17 Clemson | Foley Field • Athens, GA | 11–3 | 16–10 | 6–3 |
| April 2 | at #17 Clemson | Doug Kingsmore Stadium • Clemson, SC | 6–4 | 17–10 | 6–3 |
| April 4 | #9 South Carolina | Foley Field • Athens, GA | 1–0 | 18–10 | 7–3 |
| April 5 | #9 South Carolina | Foley Field • Athens, GA | 5–3 | 19–10 | 8–3 |
| April 6 | #9 South Carolina | Foley Field • Athens, GA | 4–2 | 20–10 | 9–3 |
| April 8 | Winthrop | Foley Field • Athens, GA | 1–5 | 20–11 | 9–3 |
| April 9 | at #10 Georgia Tech | Russ Chandler Stadium • Atlanta, GA | 4–9 | 20–12 | 9–3 |
| April 11 | #9 Kentucky | Foley Field • Athens, GA | 3–2 | 21–12 | 10–3 |
| April 12 | #9 Kentucky | Foley Field • Athens, GA | 13–4 | 22–12 | 11–3 |
| April 13 | #9 Kentucky | Foley Field • Athens, GA | 6–4 | 23–12 | 12–3 |
| April 15 | East Tennessee State | Foley Field • Athens, GA | 9–8 | 24–12 | 12–3 |
| April 16 | Georgia State | Foley Field • Athens, GA | 7–5 | 25–12 | 12–3 |
| April 18 | at LSU | Alex Box Stadium • Baton Rouge, LA | 6–3 | 26–12 | 13–3 |
| April 19 | at LSU | Alex Box Stadium • Athens, GA | 9–8 | 27–12 | 14–3 |
| April 20 | at LSU | Alex Box Stadium • Athens, GA | 10–10 | 27–12–1 | 14–3–1 |
| April 22 | Kennesaw State | Foley Field • Athens, GA | 6–2 | 28–12–1 | 14–3–1 |
| April 25 | at Florida | Alfred A. McKethan Stadium • Gainesville, FL | 7–4 | 29–12–1 | 15–3–1 |
| April 26 | at Florida | Alfred A. McKethan Stadium • Gainesville, FL | 2–7 | 29–13–1 | 15–4–1 |
| April 27 | at Florida | Alfred A. McKethan Stadium • Gainesville, FL | 2–7 | 29–14–1 | 15–5–1 |

May (6–5)

| Date | Opponent | Site/stadium | Score | Overall Record | SEC Record |
|---|---|---|---|---|---|
| May 2 | #25 Ole Miss | Foley Field • Athens, GA | 5–4 | 30–14–1 | 16–5–1 |
| May 3 | #25 Ole Miss | Foley Field • Athens, GA | 4–9 | 30–15–1 | 16–6–1 |
| May 4 | #25 Ole Miss | Foley Field • Athens, GA | 11–4 | 31–15–1 | 17–6–1 |
| May 7 | #25 Georgia Tech | Foley Field • Athens, GA | 1–11 | 31–16–1 | 17–6–1 |
| May 9 | at #16 Vanderbilt | Hawkins Field • Nashville, TN | 7–13 | 31–17–1 | 17–7–1 |
| May 10 | at #16 Vanderbilt | Hawkins Field • Nashville, TN | 4–2 | 32–17–1 | 18–7–1 |
| May 11 | at #16 Vanderbilt | Hawkins Field • Nashville, TN | 12–10 | 33–17–1 | 19–7–1 |
| May 13 | vs #25 Georgia Tech | Turner Field • Atlanta, GA | 3–2 | 34–17–1 | 19–7–1 |
| May 15 | Alabama | Foley Field • Athens, GA | 13–17 | 34–18–1 | 19–8–1 |
| May 16 | Alabama | Foley Field • Athens, GA | 5–4 | 35–18–1 | 20–8–1 |
| May 17 | Alabama | Foley Field • Athens, GA | 13–16 | 35–19–1 | 20–9–1 |

Postseason
Southeastern Conference Tournament (0–2)

| Date | Opponent | Site/stadium | Score | Overall Record | SEC Record |
|---|---|---|---|---|---|
| May 21 | vs Ole Miss | Hoover Metropolitan Stadium • Hoover, AL | 1–4 | 35–20–1 | 20–9–1 |
| May 22 | vs Alabama | Hoover Metropolitan Stadium • Hoover, AL | 2–5 | 35–21–1 | 20–9–1 |

Athens Regional (4–1)

| Date | Opponent | Site/stadium | Score | Overall Record | SEC Record |
|---|---|---|---|---|---|
| May 30 | Lipscomb | Foley Field • Athens, GA | 7–10 | 35–22–1 | 20–9–1 |
| May 31 | Louisville | Foley Field • Athens, GA | 9–8 | 36–22–1 | 20–9–1 |
| June 1 | Lipscomb | Foley Field • Athens, GA | 14–3 | 37–22–1 | 20–9–1 |
| June 1 | Georgia Tech | Foley Field • Athens, GA | 8–0 | 38–22–1 | 20–9–1 |
| June 2 | Georgia Tech | Foley Field • Athens, GA | 18–6 | 39–22–1 | 20–9–1 |

Athens Super Regional (2–1)

| Date | Opponent | Site/stadium | Score | Overall Record | SEC Record |
|---|---|---|---|---|---|
| June 6 | #15 NC State | Foley Field • Athens, GA | 11–4 | 40–22–1 | 20–9–1 |
| June 7 | #15 NC State | Foley Field • Athens, GA | 6–10 | 40–23–1 | 20–9–1 |
| June 8 | #15 NC State | Foley Field • Athens, GA | 17–8 | 41–23–1 | 20–9–1 |

2008 College World Series (4–2)

| Date | Opponent | Site/stadium | Score | Overall Record | SEC Record |
|---|---|---|---|---|---|
| June 14 | vs #1 Miami (FL) | Johnny Rosenblatt Stadium • Omaha, NE | 7–4 | 42–23–1 | 20–9–1 |
| June 16 | vs #7 Stanford | Johnny Rosenblatt Stadium • Omaha, NE | 4–3 | 43–23–1 | 20–9–1 |
| June 20 | vs #7 Stanford | Johnny Rosenblatt Stadium • Omaha, NE | 10–8 | 44–23–1 | 20–9–1 |
| June 23 | vs #8 Fresno State | Johnny Rosenblatt Stadium • Omaha, NE | 7–6 | 45–23–1 | 20–9–1 |
| June 24 | vs #8 Fresno State | Johnny Rosenblatt Stadium • Omaha, NE | 10–19 | 45–24–1 | 20–9–1 |
| June 25 | vs #8 Fresno State | Johnny Rosenblatt Stadium • Omaha, NE | 1–6 | 45–25–1 | 20–9–1 |

== Awards and honors ==
Gordon Beckham

- Southeastern Conference Baseball Player of the Year
- Baseball America First Team All-American
- Collegiate Baseball First Team All-American
- National Collegiate Baseball Writers Association First Team All-American
- American Baseball Coaches Association First Team All-American
- All-Tournament Team

Ryan Peisel

- All-Tournament Team

Joshua Fields

- Baseball America Second Team All-American
- Collegiate Baseball First Team All-American
- National Collegiate Baseball Writers Association First Team All-American
- American Baseball Coaches Association Second Team All-American

== Bulldogs in the 2008 MLB draft ==
The following members of the Georgia Bulldogs baseball program were drafted in the 2008 Major League Baseball draft.

| Round | Pick | Player | Position | MLB Club |
|---|---|---|---|---|
| 1 | 8 | Gordon Beckham | SS | Chicago White Sox |
| 1 | 20 | Joshua Fields | P | Seattle Mariners |
| 10 | 298 | Trevor Holder | P | Florida Marlins |
| 10 | 317 | Stephen Dodson | P | Colorado Rockies |
| 11 | 326 | Nathan Moreau | P | Baltimore Orioles |
| 12 | 377 | Ryan Peisel | 1B | Colorado Rockies |
