= 2008 ACC tournament =

2008 ACC tournament may refer to:

- 2008 ACC men's basketball tournament
- 2008 ACC women's basketball tournament
- 2008 ACC men's soccer tournament
- 2008 ACC women's soccer tournament
- 2008 Atlantic Coast Conference baseball tournament
- 2008 Atlantic Coast Conference softball tournament
