= 2008 Clemson Tigers baseball team =

American college baseball season

2008 Clemson Tigers baseball
- Conference: Atlantic Coast Conference
- Atlantic
- Record: 31–27–1 (12–20–1 ACC)
- Head coach: Jack Leggett
- Home stadium: Doug Kingsmore Stadium

2008 Atlantic Coast Conference baseball standings
	Conf.				Overall
Team	W		L	PCT	W		L	PCT
Atlantic
No. 7 Florida State ^{x}‍‍‍^{y}	24	–	6	.800	54	–	14	.794
No. 15 NC State ‍‍‍^{y}	18	–	11	.621	42	–	22	.656
Wake Forest ‍‍‍	13	–	16	.448	25	–	31	.446
Clemson ‍‍‍	11	–	18	.379	31	–	27	.534
Maryland ‍‍‍	9	–	21	.300	30	–	26	.536
Boston College ‍‍‍	9	–	21	.300	26	–	27	.491
Coastal
No. 5 Miami (FL) ^{x}‍‍‡‍^{y}	23	–	5	.821	53	–	11	.828
No. 3 North Carolina ‍‍‍^{y}	22	–	7	.759	54	–	14	.794
No. 24 Georgia Tech^{y} ‍‍‍	16	–	14	.533	41	–	21	.661
Virginia ‍‍‍^{y}	15	–	15	.500	39	–	23	.629
Duke ‍‍‍	10	–	18	.357	37	–	18	.673
Virginia Tech ‍‍‍	6	–	24	.200	23	–	32	.418
x – Division champion ‡ – Tournament champion y – Invited to the NCAA tournament As of June 27, 2008; Rankings from Collegiate Baseball

The 2008 Clemson Tigers baseball team represented Clemson University in the 2008 NCAA Division I baseball season. The team played home games at Doug Kingsmore Stadium in Clemson, SC.

The team was coached by Jack Leggett in his fifteenth season at Clemson. The Tigers posted a record of 31–27–1, finished in 8th place in the ACC, and failed to advance to NCAA Tournament play, ending a streak of appearances dating back to 1987.

== Roster ==
=== Coaching staff ===
Name	Title	First season at CU	Alma mater
Jack Leggett	Head Coach	1994	Maine (1976)
Tom Riginos	Associate Head Coach	2003	Stetson (1990)
Kyle Bunn	Assistant Head Coach	2008	The Citadel (2000)
Toby Bicknell	Volunteer Assistant Coach	2007	Wingate (2002)

== Broadcasts ==
=== Radio ===
On Wednesday, February 6, 2008, the Clemson Tigers Sports Network announced that it will broadcast 36 regular-season baseball games, while the other 20 regular-season games will be broadcast by WCCP-FM (104.9 FM) out of Clemson. Clemson Tiger Sports Network will broadcast the 30 ACC regular-season games along with the four games against South Carolina and both games against Georgia.

The network will also carry all postseason contests. The other 20 regular-season games will be carried by WCCP.

All games will be available online through WCCPFM.com.

=== TV ===
Currently announced TV broadcasts:

Date	Time	Opponent	Location	Television	Webcast
February 29	4:50pm	College of Charleston	Charleston, SC		Inside the Pride
March 1	1:30pm	South Carolina	Columbia, SC		CSTV XXL
March 2	2:00pm	South Carolina	Clemson, SC		ACCSelect.com
March 8	1:00pm	Wake Forest	Winston-Salem, NC		ACCSelect.com
March 9	1:00pm	Wake Forest	Winston-Salem, NC		ACCSelect.com
March 11	4:00pm	UNC Greensboro	Clemson, SC		ACCSelect.com
March 15	2:00pm	Boston College	Clemson, SC		ACCSelect.com
March 18	7:15pm	Coastal Carolina	Clemson, SC		ACCSelect.com
March 21	7:15pm	NC State	Clemson, SC		ACCSelect.com
March 22	7:00pm	NC State	Clemson, SC		ACCSelect.com
March 25	7:15pm	Elon	Clemson, SC		ACCSelect.com
April 1	7:00pm	Georgia	Athens, GA	CSS	georgiadogs.com
April 2	7:05pm	Georgia	Clemson, SC		ACCSelect.com
April 4	7:00pm	Miami (FL)	Coral Gables, FL		ACCSelect.com
April 5	7:00pm	Miami (FL)	Coral Gables, FL	CSS	
April 6	1:00pm	Miami (FL)	Coral Gables, FL	CSS	
April 9	7:00pm	South Carolina	Columbia, SC		CSTV XXL
April 11	7:15pm	North Carolina	Clemson, SC		ACCSelect.com
April 12	4:00pm	North Carolina	Clemson, SC		ACCSelect.com
April 16	7:00pm	South Carolina	Clemson, SC	CSS	
April 18	7:00pm	Duke	Durham, NC		ACCSelect.com
April 19	2:00pm	Duke	Durham, NC		ACCSelect.com
April 25	Noon	Virginia Tech	Clemson, SC		ACCSelect.com
April 26	7:00pm	Virginia Tech	Clemson, SC		ACCSelect.com
April 27	1:00pm	Virginia Tech	Clemson, SC		ACCSelect.com
May 3	7:00pm	Florida State	Clemson, SC	Raycom	
May 4	7:00pm	Florida State	Clemson, SC	CSS, Sun Sports	
May 5	7:00pm	Florida State	Clemson, SC	Sun Sports	
May 9	7:00pm	Georgia Tech	Atlanta, GA		ACCSelect.com
May 10	7:00pm	Georgia Tech	Atlanta, GA	CSS	ACCSelect.com
May 11	1:00pm	Georgia Tech	Atlanta, GA		ACCSelect.com
May 13	7:15pm	College of Charleston	Clemson, SC		ACCSelect.com
May 15	6:30pm	Central Florida	Orlando, FL		CSTV
May 16	6:30pm	Central Florida	Orlando, FL		CSTV
May 17	6:30pm	Central Florida	Orlando, FL		CSTV
2008 ACC baseball tournament
May 21	1:00pm	Miami (FL)	Jacksonville, FL	FSN South; SUN Sports; CSS Mid-Atlantic	ACCSelect.com
May 22	8:00pm	NC State	Jacksonville, FL	FSN South; SUN Sports	ACCSelect.com
May 24	10:00am	Georgia Tech	Jacksonville, FL	FSN South; SUN Sports; CSS Mid-Atlantic	ACCSelect.com

== Schedule/Results ==
2008 Clemson Tigers baseball Game Log
Regular Season

Date	Opponent^{#}	Rank^{#}	Location	Win	Loss	Save	Result	Record (ACC)
Feb. 22	Mercer*	Postponed (rain) Rescheduled for February 23						
Feb. 23	Mercer*	#16	Doug Kingsmore Stadium	Hinson (1–0)	Webster (0–1)		W 12–5	1–0
Feb. 23	Mercer*	#16	Doug Kingsmore Stadium	Mitchell (1–0)	Boyette (0–1)	Vaughn (1)	W 6–5	2–0
Feb. 24	Mercer*	#16	Doug Kingsmore Stadium	Stoneburner (1–0)	Hoelzer (0–1)		W 10–3	3–0
Feb. 27	High Point*	#16	Doug Kingsmore Stadium	Gullickson (1–0)	Scott (0–1)		W 12–3	4–0
Feb. 29	@ #45 College of Charleston*	#16	Patriot's Point Athletics Complex	Martin (1–0)	Simpson (2–1)	Vaughn (2)	W 7–6	5–0
Mar. 1	@ #3 South Carolina*	#16	Sarge Frye Field	Cisco (2–0)	Hinson (1–1)		L 1–10	5–1
Mar. 2	#3 South Carolina*	#16	Doug Kingsmore Stadium	Cooper (1–1)	Mitchell (1–1)	Johnson (1)	L 1–5	5–2
Mar. 5	Wofford*	#17	Doug Kingsmore Stadium	Zoltak (1–0)	Summers (2–1)	Vaughn (3)	W 9–7	6–2
Mar. 7	@ Wake Forest	Postponed (rain) Rescheduled for March 8						
Mar. 8	@ Wake Forest	#17	Gene Hooks Stadium	Negus (2–0)	Hinson (1–2)	Kledzik (1)	L 11–13	6–3 (0–1)
Mar. 9	@ Wake Forest	#17	Gene Hooks Stadium	Bullock (2–0)	Mitchell (1–2)	Kledzik (2)	L 3–5	6–4 (0–2)
Mar. 9	@ Wake Forest	#17	Gene Hooks Stadium	Rothlin (1–0)	Kledzik (0–1)	Vaughn (4)	W 12–11	7–4 (1–2)
Mar. 11	UNC Greensboro*	#24	Doug Kingsmore Stadium	Stoneburner (2–0)	Slack (0–1)	Vaughn (5)	W 11–10	8–4
Mar. 12	UNC Greensboro*	#24	Doug Kingsmore Stadium	Zoltak (2–0)	Gilliam (1–3)		W 6–5	9–4
Mar. 14	Boston College	#24	Doug Kingsmore Stadium	Doyle (2–1)	Hinson (1–3)	Hayer (1)	L 4–6	9–5 (1–3)
Mar. 15	Boston College	#24	Doug Kingsmore Stadium	Dean (1–1)	Harman (0–1)	Kowalski (1)	L 6–7	9–6 (1–4)
Mar. 16	Boston College	#24	Doug Kingsmore Stadium	Stoneburner (3–0)	MacDonald (2–2)		W 16–2	10–6 (2–4)
Mar. 18	#21 Coastal Carolina*	#31	Doug Kingsmore Stadium	Sarratt (1–0)	Anderson (3–1)		W 9–6	11–6
Mar. 19	Furman*	Postponed (rain) Rescheduled for March 20						
Mar. 20	Furman*	#31	Doug Kingsmore Stadium	Gullickson (2–0)	Holloway (1–2)		W 14–2	12–6
Mar. 21	#37 NC State	#31	Doug Kingsmore Stadium	Cutler (3–0)	Harman (0–2)	Gillheeney (4)	L 4–5	12–7 (2–5)
Mar. 22	#37 NC State	#31	Doug Kingsmore Stadium	Mitchell (2–2)	Shunick (2–2)	Vaughn (6)	W 3–2	13–7 (3–5)
Mar. 23	#37 NC State	#31	Doug Kingsmore Stadium	Stoneburner (4–0)	McConnell (2–1)		W 2–0	14–7 (4–5)
Mar. 25	#44 Elon*	#28	Doug Kingsmore Stadium	Zoltak (3–0)	Harrilchak (2–1)	Vaughn (7)	W 5–4	15–7
Mar. 26	#44 Elon*	#28	Doug Kingsmore Stadium	Gullickson (3–0)	Porter (1–1)	Hinson (1)	W 2–1	16–7
Mar. 28	@ Maryland	#28	Shipley Field	Mitchell (3–2)	Swinson (3–3)	Vaughn (8)	W 2–1	17–7 (5–5)
Mar. 29	@ Maryland	#28	Shipley Field	Kolarek (1–0)	Sarratt (1–1)	Quinn (4)	L 3–5	17–8 (5–6)
Mar. 30	@ Maryland	#28	Shipley Field	Hinson (2–3)	Kearney (0–1)		W 6–2	18–8 (6–6)
April 1	@ #36 Georgia*	#26	Foley Field	McRee (4–1)	Gullickson (1–1)		L 3–11	18–9
April 2	#36 Georgia*	#26	Doug Kingsmore Stadium	Esmonde (1–0)	Harman (0–3)	Fields (7)	L 4–6	18–10
April 4	@ #2 Miami (FL)	#26	Mark Light Field	Bellamy (4–0)	Vaughn (0–1)		L 4–6	18–11 (6–7)
April 5	@ #2 Miami (FL)	#26	Mark Light Field	Bellamy (5–0)	Harman (0–4)	Gutierrez (7)	L 5–15	18–12 (6–8)
April 6	@ #2 Miami (FL)	#26	Mark Light Field	Guerra (1–0)	Hinson (2–4)	Gutierrez (8)	L 6–7	18–13 (6–9)
April 9	@ #14 South Carolina*	#37	Sarge Frye Field	Godwin (3–2)	Gullickson (3–2)		L 1–7	18–14
April 11	#4 North Carolina	#37	Doug Kingsmore Stadium	White (6–2)	Mitchell (3–3)		L 2–8	18–15 (6–10)
April 12	#4 North Carolina	#37	Doug Kingsmore Stadium	Catapano (2–0)	Stoneburner (4–1)	Moran (1)	L 3–4	18–16 (6–11)
April 13	#4 North Carolina	#37	Doug Kingsmore Stadium	Catapano (3-)	Hinson (2–5)	Trice (1)	L 2–8	18–17 (6–12)
April 15	Western Carolina*		Doug Kingsmore Stadium	Saberhagen (3–3)	Vaughn (0–2)	Sexton (2)	L 2–6	18–18
April 16	#10 South Carolina*		Doug Kingsmore Stadium	Godwin (4–2)	Sarratt (1–2)		L 0–6	18–19
April 18	@ Duke		Jack Coombs Field	Mitchell (4–3)	Wolcott (3–3)	Vaughn (9)	W 7–4	19–19 (7–12)
April 19	@ Duke		Jack Coombs Field	Manno (4–0)	Stoneburner (4–2)	Hassan (5)	L 1–10	19–20 (7–13)
April 20	@ Duke		Jack Coombs Field				T 6–6	19–20–1 (7–13–1)
April 22	@ Western Carolina*		Hennon Stadium	Delk (1–0)	Ottone (1–2)		W 6–0	20–20–1
April 23	vs. Presbyterian*		Fluor Field at the West End	Gullickson (4–2)	Dollar (2–3)		W 12–7	21–20–1
April 25	Virginia Tech		Doug Kingsmore Stadium	Stoneburner (5–2)	Ballard (2–5		W 13–5	22–20–1 (8–13–1)
April 26	Virginia Tech		Doug Kingsmore Stadium	Vaughn (1–2)	Wymer (5–5)		W 8–7	23–20–1 (9–13–1)
April 27	Virginia Tech		Doug Kingsmore Stadium	Mitchell (5–3)	Hahn (2–5)		W 10–2	24–20–1 (10–13–1)
May 3	#3 Florida State		Doug Kingsmore Stadium	Strauss (7–0)	Harman (0–5)	Posey (5)	L 8–9	24–21–1 (10–14–1)
May 4	#3 Florida State		Doug Kingsmore Stadium	Villanueva (5–2)	Stoneburner (5–3)		L 4–13	24–22–1 (10–15–1)
May 5	#3 Florida State		Doug Kingsmore Stadium	Parker (5–1)	Delk (1–1)	Marshall (2)	L 2–4	24–23–1 (10–16–1)
May 7	vs. Furman*		Fluor Field at the West End	Zoltak (4–0)	Hale (1–1)		W 11–5	25–23–1
May 9	@ Georgia Tech		Russ Chandler Stadium	Duncan (7–2)	Mitchell (5–4)		L 1–5	25–24–1 (10–17–1)
May 10	@ Georgia Tech		Russ Chandler Stadium	Burns (6–4)	Stoneburner (5–4)		L 1–7	25–25–1 (10–18–1)
May 11	@ Georgia Tech		Russ Chandler Stadium	Delk (2–1)	Von Tersch		W 16–6	26–25–1 (11–18–1)
May 13	College of Charleston*		Doug Kingsmore Stadium	Harman (1–5)	Caulfield (4–3)		W 12–6	27–25–1
May 15	@ Central Florida*		Jay Bergman Field	Mitchell (6–4)	Sweat (5–4)		W 9–1	28–25–1
May 16	@ Central Florida*		Jay Bergman Field	Stoneburner (6–4)	Herold (4–4)	Vaughn (10)	W 7–3	29–25–1
May 17	@ Central Florida*		Jay Bergman Field	Sarratt (2–2)	Griggs (1–4)	Vaughn (11)	W 8–5	30–25–1
*Non-Conference Game. ^{#}Rankings from ESPN/USA Today Coaches Poll.

2008 ACC Baseball Tournament

Date	Opponent^{#}	Seed^{#}	Location	Win	Loss	Save	Result	Record
May 21	vs. #1 Miami (FL)	#8	Baseball Grounds of Jacksonville	Hernandez (11–0)	Mitchell (6–5)		L 1–7	30–26–1
May 22	vs. #4 N.C. State	#8	Baseball Grounds of Jacksonville	Shunick (6–5)	Stoneburner (6–5)		L 0–10	30–27–1
May 24	vs. #5 Georgia Tech	#8	Baseball Grounds of Jacksonville	Hinson (3–5)	Von Tersch (7–5)		W 10–4	31–27–1
^{#}Rankings indicate tournament seeds.

== Rankings ==
Ranking Movement	Week															
Poll	Pre	1	2	3	4	5	6	7	8	9	10	11	12	13	14	Final
USA Today/ESPN Coaches	16	16	17	24	31	28	26	34	NR	NR	NR	NR	NR	NR	NR	NR
Baseball America	23	19	23	NR	NR	NR	NR	NR	NR	NR	NR	NR	NR	NR	NR	NR
Collegiate Baseball	13	13	17	26	NR	NR	NR	NR	NR	NR	NR	NR	NR	NR	NR	NR
NCBWA	16	13	14	18	21	19	17	27	NR	NR	NR	NR	NR	NR	NR	NR
Rivals.com	NR	23	23	NR	NR	NR	NR	NR	NR	NR	NR	NR	NR	NR	NR	NR
