= 2008 Atlantic Coast Conference baseball tournament =

American college baseball tournament

- 2007-08 ACC baseball tournament logo
- Teams: 8
- Format: 2 division round robin and championship game
- Finals site: Baseball Grounds of Jacksonville; Jacksonville, Florida
- Champions: Miami Hurricanes (1st title)
- Winning coach: Jim Morris (5th title)
- MVP: Dave DiNatale (Miami Hurricanes)

2008 Atlantic Coast Conference baseball standings
	Conf.				Overall
Team	W		L	PCT	W		L	PCT
Atlantic
No. 7 Florida State ^{x}‍‍‍^{y}	24	–	6	.800	54	–	14	.794
No. 15 NC State ‍‍‍^{y}	18	–	11	.621	42	–	22	.656
Wake Forest ‍‍‍	13	–	16	.448	25	–	31	.446
Clemson ‍‍‍	11	–	18	.379	31	–	27	.534
Maryland ‍‍‍	9	–	21	.300	30	–	26	.536
Boston College ‍‍‍	9	–	21	.300	26	–	27	.491
Coastal
No. 5 Miami (FL) ^{x}‍‍‡‍^{y}	23	–	5	.821	53	–	11	.828
No. 3 North Carolina ‍‍‍^{y}	22	–	7	.759	54	–	14	.794
No. 24 Georgia Tech^{y} ‍‍‍	16	–	14	.533	41	–	21	.661
Virginia ‍‍‍^{y}	15	–	15	.500	39	–	23	.629
Duke ‍‍‍	10	–	18	.357	37	–	18	.673
Virginia Tech ‍‍‍	6	–	24	.200	23	–	32	.418
x – Division champion ‡ – Tournament champion y – Invited to the NCAA tournament As of June 27, 2008; Rankings from Collegiate Baseball

The 2008 Atlantic Coast Conference baseball tournament was held at the Baseball Grounds of Jacksonville in Jacksonville, Florida, from May 21 through 25. The #1 seeded University of Miami won the tournament with a perfect 4–0 record, earning the Atlantic Coast Conference's automatic bid to the 2008 NCAA Division I baseball tournament. It was Miami's first conference championship in baseball after having played as an independent until joining the ACC during the 2004–05 academic year.

2008 was the second year in which the conference used a round robin tournament format, with the team with the best record in each group at the end of the three-game round robin advancing to a one-game championship.

== Seeding Procedure ==
From TheACC.com:

The top two teams from both the Atlantic and Coastal divisions, as determined by conference winning percentage, in addition to the four teams with the next best conference winning percentage, regardless of division, will be selected to participate in the ACC Baseball Championship. The two division champions will automatically be seeded number one and two based on winning percentage in overall conference competition. The remaining teams will be seeded (three through eight) based on winning percentage in overall conference competition without regard to division. All ties will be broken using the tie-breaking provisions.

- Boston College, Duke, Maryland and Virginia Tech did not make the tournament.

== Tournament ==
	Division A	UM	NCST	GT	CU	Overall
1	Miami (FL)		W 5–2	W 15–12	W 7–1	3–0
4	NC State	L 2–5		L 9–10	W 10–0	1–2
5	Georgia Tech	L 12–15	W 10–9		L 4–10	1–2
8	Clemson	L 1–7	L 0–10	W 10–4		1–2

	Division B	FSU	UNC	UVA	WFU	Overall
2	Florida State		W 9–6	L 3–5	W 8–3	2–1
3	North Carolina	L 6–9		L 7–8^{11}	W 2–0	1–2
6	Virginia	W 5–3	W 8–7^{11}		L 4–7	2–1
7	Wake Forest	L 3–8	L 0–2	W 7–4		1–2

Finals
A	Miami	8
B	Virginia	4

- Florida State and Miami were Regular Season Division Champs.

== All-Tournament Team ==
Position	Player	School
1B	Yonder Alonso	Miami
2B	*Jemile Weeks	Miami
3B	Drew Martin	NC State
SS	Tommy Foschi	NC State
C	Buster Posey	Florida State
OF	*David Coleman	Virginia
OF	Dave DiNatale	Miami
OF	Blake Tekotte	Miami
DH	Allan Dykstra	Wake Forest
P	Matt Harvey	North Carolina
P	Chris Hernandez	Miami
MVP	Dave DiNatale	Miami

(*)Denotes Unanimous Selection

== See also ==
- College World Series
- NCAA Division I Baseball Championship
