= 2008 North Carolina Tar Heels baseball team =

American college baseball season

2008 North Carolina Tar Heels baseball

Cary Regional champions Cary Super Regional champions

College World Series, T-3rd
- Conference: Atlantic Coast
- CB: No. 3
- Record: 54–14 (22–7 ACC)
- Head coach: Mike Fox (10th season)
- Assistant coaches: Chad Holbrook (15th season); Matt McCay (1st season)
- Pitching coach: Scott Forbes (3rd season)
- Home stadium: USA Baseball National Training Complex

2008 Atlantic Coast Conference baseball standings
| | Conf. | | | | Overall |
| Team | W | | L | PCT | W | | L | PCT |
|---|---|---|---|---|---|---|---|---|
Atlantic
| No. 7 Florida State ^{x}‍‍‍^{y} | 24 | – | 6 | .800 | 54 | – | 14 | .794 |
| No. 15 NC State ‍‍‍^{y} | 18 | – | 11 | .621 | 42 | – | 22 | .656 |
| Wake Forest ‍‍‍ | 13 | – | 16 | .448 | 25 | – | 31 | .446 |
| Clemson ‍‍‍ | 11 | – | 18 | .379 | 31 | – | 27 | .534 |
| Maryland ‍‍‍ | 9 | – | 21 | .300 | 30 | – | 26 | .536 |
| Boston College ‍‍‍ | 9 | – | 21 | .300 | 26 | – | 27 | .491 |
Coastal
| No. 5 Miami (FL) ^{x}‍‍‡‍^{y} | 23 | – | 5 | .821 | 53 | – | 11 | .828 |
| No. 3 North Carolina ‍‍‍^{y} | 22 | – | 7 | .759 | 54 | – | 14 | .794 |
| No. 24 Georgia Tech^{y} ‍‍‍ | 16 | – | 14 | .533 | 41 | – | 21 | .661 |
| Virginia ‍‍‍^{y} | 15 | – | 15 | .500 | 39 | – | 23 | .629 |
| Duke ‍‍‍ | 10 | – | 18 | .357 | 37 | – | 18 | .673 |
| Virginia Tech ‍‍‍ | 6 | – | 24 | .200 | 23 | – | 32 | .418 |
x – Division champion ‡ – Tournament champion y – Invited to the NCAA tournament As of June 27, 2008; Rankings from Collegiate Baseball

The 2008 North Carolina Tar Heels baseball team represented University of North Carolina at Chapel Hill in the 2008 NCAA Division I baseball season. The Tar Heels played their home games at USA Baseball National Training Complex. The team was coached by Mike Fox in his 10th year as head coach at North Carolina.

The Tar Heels won the Cary Regional and the Cary Regional Super Regional to advance to the College World Series, where they were defeated by the Fresno State Bulldogs.

The team played the season at the USA National Training Complex while Boshamer Stadium was being renovated.

== Roster ==
2008 North Carolina Tar Heels baseball team
Players
Coaches

| # | Pos. | Name | B/T | Height | Weight | Year | Home town |
|---|---|---|---|---|---|---|---|
| 1 | INF | Kyle Shelton | R/R | 6 ft 0 in (1.83 m) | 177 lb (80 kg) | Sr | Charlotte, North Carolina |
| 3 | OF | Ben Bunting | L/L | 5 ft 7 in (1.7 m) | 165 lb (75 kg) | Fr | Randleman, North Carolina |
| 4 | INF | Garrett Gore | R/R | 5 ft 10 in (1.78 m) | 176 lb (80 kg) | Jr | Wilmington, North Carolina |
| 5 | OF | Zeke Blanton | R/R | 6 ft 0 in (1.83 m) | 198 lb (90 kg) | Fr | Forest City, North Carolina |
| 6 | RHP | Alex White | R/R | 6 ft 3 in (1.91 m) | 191 lb (87 kg) | So | Greenville, North Carolina |
| 7 | RHP | Ryan Leach | R/R | 5 ft 11 in (1.8 m) | 173 lb (78 kg) | Fr | Kings Mountain, North Carolina |
| 8 | C | Mark Fluery | L/R | 6 ft 0 in (1.83 m) | 202 lb (92 kg) | So | Roswell, Georgia |
| 10 | INF | Kyle Seager | L/R | 6 ft 1 in (1.85 m) | 194 lb (88 kg) | So | Kannapolis, North Carolina |
| 11 | OF | Mike Cavasinni | L/R | 5 ft 7 in (1.7 m) | 162 lb (73 kg) | Jr | Huntersville, North Carolina |
| 12 | LHP | Logan Munson | L/L | 6 ft 0 in (1.83 m) | 210 lb (95 kg) | Fr | Columbia, South Carolina |
| 13 | INF | Dustin Ackley | L/R | 6 ft 0 in (1.83 m) | 182 lb (83 kg) | So | Walnut Cove, North Carolina |
| 14 | RHP | Greg Holt | R/R | 6 ft 2 in (1.88 m) | 201 lb (91 kg) | Fr | Clemmons, North Carolina |
| 15 | LHP | Rob Catapano | L/L | 5 ft 10 in (1.78 m) | 172 lb (78 kg) | So | Knoxville, Tennessee |
| 16 | OF | Tim Fedroff | L/R | 5 ft 11 in (1.8 m) | 191 lb (87 kg) | So | Flagtown, New Jersey |
| 17 | RHP | Patrick Johnson | R/R | 5 ft 10 in (1.78 m) | 170 lb (77 kg) | Fr | Conover, North Carolina |
| 18 | RHP | Mike Facchinei | R/R | 6 ft 2 in (1.88 m) | 195 lb (88 kg) | Sr | Arden, North Carolina |
| 19 | C | Tim Federowicz | R/R | 5 ft 10 in (1.78 m) | 213 lb (97 kg) | Jr | Apex, North Carolina |
| 20 | RHP | Garrett Davis | L/R | 6 ft 4 in (1.93 m) | 200 lb (91 kg) | Fr | Fremont, North Carolina |
| 24 | INF | Ryan Graepel | R/R | 6 ft 1 in (1.85 m) | 169 lb (77 kg) | So | Greenville, North Carolina |
| 25 | RHP | Colin Bates | R/R | 6 ft 1 in (1.85 m) | 179 lb (81 kg) | RS Fr | Naperville, Illinois |
| 26 | INF | Michael Knox | R/R | 6 ft 4 in (1.93 m) | 232 lb (105 kg) | Fr | Cary, North Carolina |
| 27 | OF | Seth Williams | R/R | 6 ft 1 in (1.85 m) | 201 lb (91 kg) | Sr | Hendersonville, North Carolina |
| 28 | RHP | Adam Warren | R/R | 6 ft 2 in (1.88 m) | 206 lb (93 kg) | Jr | New Bern, North Carolina |
| 29 | RHP | Nate Striz | R/R | 6 ft 2 in (1.88 m) | 237 lb (108 kg) | Fr | Lakeland, Florida |
| 32 | RHP | Bryant Gaines | R/R | 6 ft 6 in (1.98 m) | 261 lb (118 kg) | RS Fr | Weddington, North Carolina |
| 33 | OF | Kendric Burney | R/R | 5 ft 10 in (1.78 m) | 185 lb (84 kg) | So | Jacksonville, North Carolina |
| 34 | INF | Chad Flack | R/R | 6 ft 3 in (1.91 m) | 224 lb (102 kg) | Sr | Forest City, North Carolina |
| 35 | RHP | Rob Wooten | R/R | 6 ft 1 in (1.85 m) | 208 lb (94 kg) | RS Sr | Fremont, North Carolina |
| 36 | INF | Brett Thomas | L/L | 6 ft 4 in (1.93 m) | 215 lb (98 kg) | Fr | Columbia, South Carolina |
| 38 | C | Mike McKee | R/R | 5 ft 10 in (1.78 m) | 174 lb (79 kg) | Jr | Arden, North Carolina |
| 39 | INF | Tarron Robinson | L/L | 6 ft 2 in (1.88 m) | 206 lb (93 kg) | Fr | Chapel Hill, North Carolina |
| 40 | RHP | Tyler Trice | R/R | 6 ft 4 in (1.93 m) | 195 lb (88 kg) | Sr | Cherryville, North Carolina |
| 41 | RHP | Robbie Penny | R/R | 6 ft 2 in (1.88 m) | 176 lb (80 kg) | Fr | Whiteville, North Carolina |
| 42 | RHP | B. J. Dail | R/R | 6 ft 2 in (1.88 m) | 193 lb (88 kg) | So | Raleigh, North Carolina |
| 43 | RHP | Matt Harvey | R/R | 6 ft 4 in (1.93 m) | 210 lb (95 kg) | Fr | Mystic, Connecticut |
| 46 | LHP | Brian Moran | /L | 6 ft 3 in (1.91 m) | 188 lb (85 kg) | So | Rye, New York |

Head coach

30 Mike Fox

Assistant coach(es)

2 Chad Holbrook

Hitting coach(es)

37 Matt McCay

Pitching coach(es)

21 Scott Forbes

Legend

- (C) Team captain
- (S) Suspended
- (I) Ineligible
- Injured
- Current redshirt

Roster
Last update: January 4, 2022

== Schedule ==
2008 North Carolina Tar Heels baseball game log
Regular season
February (5–1)

| # | Date | Opponent | Site/stadium | Score | Overall record | ACC record |
|---|---|---|---|---|---|---|
| 1 | February 22 | at Florida Atlantic | FAU Baseball Stadium • Boca Raton, Florida | 7–1 | 1–0 | – |
| 2 | February 23 | at Florida Atlantic | FAU Baseball Stadium • Boca Raton, Florida | 14–13 | 2–0 | – |
| 3 | February 24 | at Florida Atlantic | FAU Baseball Stadium • Boca Raton, Florida | 8–7 | 3–0 | – |
| 4 | February 26 | Old Dominion | USA Baseball National Training Complex • Cary, North Carolina | 6–8 | 3–1 | – |
| 5 | February 28 | at Winthrop | Winthrop Ballpark • Rock Hill, South Carolina | 6–1 | 4–1 | – |
| 6 | February 29 | vs Kent State | Winthrop Ballpark • Rock Hill, South Carolina | 8–1 | 5–1 | – |

March (16–4)

| # | Date | Opponent | Site/stadium | Score | Overall record | ACC record |
|---|---|---|---|---|---|---|
| 7 | March 1 | vs St. John's | Winthrop Ballpark • Rock Hill, South Carolina | 6–2 | 6–1 | – |
| 8 | March 2 | vs St. John's | Winthrop Ballpark • Rock Hill, South Carolina | 4–2 | 7–1 | – |
| 9 | March 4 | William & Mary | USA Baseball National Training Complex • Cary, North Carolina | 10–2 | 8–1 | – |
| 10 | March 8 | at Duke | Jack Coombs Field • Durham, North Carolina | 4–13 | 8–2 | 0–1 |
| 11 | March 8 | at Duke | Jack Coombs Field • Durham, North Carolina | 9–3 | 9–2 | 1–1 |
| 12 | March 9 | at Duke | Jack Coombs Field • Durham, North Carolina | 9–0 | 10–2 | 2–1 |
| 13 | March 11 | Coastal Carolina | USA Baseball National Training Complex • Cary, North Carolina | 4–11 | 10–3 | 2–1 |
| 14 | March 12 | VCU | USA Baseball National Training Complex • Cary, North Carolina | 10–2 | 11–3 | 2–1 |
| 15 | March 14 | Virginia Tech | USA Baseball National Training Complex • Cary, North Carolina | 11–1 | 12–3 | 3–1 |
| 16 | March 15 | Virginia Tech | USA Baseball National Training Complex • Cary, North Carolina | 6–5 | 13–3 | 4–1 |
| 17 | March 16 | Virginia Tech | USA Baseball National Training Complex • Cary, North Carolina | 6–0 | 14–3 | 5–1 |
| 18 | March 18 | Princeton | USA Baseball National Training Complex • Cary, North Carolina | 7–0 | 15–3 | 5–1 |
| 19 | March 19 | Princeton | USA Baseball National Training Complex • Cary, North Carolina | 8–2 | 16–3 | 5–1 |
| 20 | March 21 | at Maryland | Shipley Field • College Park, Maryland | 2–4 | 16–4 | 5–2 |
| 21 | March 22 | at Maryland | Shipley Field • College Park, Maryland | 14–1 | 17–4 | 6–2 |
| 22 | March 23 | at Maryland | Shipley Field • College Park, Maryland | 19–1 | 18–4 | 7–2 |
| 23 | March 25 | Davidson | USA Baseball National Training Complex • Cary, North Carolina | 12–6 | 19–4 | 7–2 |
| 24 | March 26 | Gardner–Webb | USA Baseball National Training Complex • Cary, North Carolina | 13–2 | 20–4 | 7–2 |
| 25 | March 28 | NC State | USA Baseball National Training Complex • Cary, North Carolina | 5–2 | 21–4 | 8–2 |
| 26 | March 29 | NC State | USA Baseball National Training Complex • Cary, North Carolina | 6–8 | 21–5 | 8–3 |

April (17–3)

| # | Date | Opponent | Site/stadium | Score | Overall record | ACC record |
|---|---|---|---|---|---|---|
| 27 | April 1 | UNC Greensboro | USA Baseball National Training Complex • Cary, North Carolina | 4–1 | 22–5 | 8–3 |
| 28 | April 2 | Appalachian State | USA Baseball National Training Complex • Cary, North Carolina | 7–0 | 23–5 | 8–3 |
| 29 | April 4 | Georgia Tech | USA Baseball National Training Complex • Cary, North Carolina | 8–1 | 24–5 | 9–3 |
| 30 | April 6 | Georgia Tech | USA Baseball National Training Complex • Cary, North Carolina | 10–4 | 25–5 | 10–3 |
| 31 | April 6 | Georgia Tech | USA Baseball National Training Complex • Cary, North Carolina | 1–4 | 25–6 | 10–4 |
| 32 | April 8 | Elon | USA Baseball National Training Complex • Cary, North Carolina | 0–2 | 25–7 | 10–4 |
| 33 | April 9 | North Carolina A&T | USA Baseball National Training Complex • Cary, North Carolina | 5–0 | 26–7 | 10–4 |
| 34 | April 11 | at Clemson | Doug Kingsmore Stadium • Clemson, South Carolina | 8–2 | 27–7 | 11–4 |
| 35 | April 12 | at Clemson | Doug Kingsmore Stadium • Clemson, South Carolina | 4–3 | 28–7 | 12–4 |
| 36 | April 13 | at Clemson | Doug Kingsmore Stadium • Clemson, South Carolina | 8–4 | 29–7 | 13–4 |
| 37 | April 15 | at UNC Greensboro | UNCG Baseball Stadium • Greensboro, North Carolina | 14–3 | 30–7 | 13–4 |
| 38 | April 16 | Charlotte | USA Baseball National Training Complex • Cary, North Carolina | 5–4 | 31–7 | 13–4 |
| 39 | April 18 | Boston College | USA Baseball National Training Complex • Cary, North Carolina | 12–3 | 32–7 | 14–4 |
| 40 | April 19 | Boston College | USA Baseball National Training Complex • Cary, North Carolina | 6–0 | 33–7 | 15–4 |
| 41 | April 20 | Boston College | USA Baseball National Training Complex • Cary, North Carolina | 8–2 | 34–7 | 16–4 |
| 42 | April 22 | at Charlotte | Robert and Mariam Hayes Stadium • Charlotte, North Carolina | 17–0 | 35–7 | 16–4 |
| 43 | April 23 | High Point | USA Baseball National Training Complex • Cary, North Carolina | 10–5 | 36–7 | 16–4 |
| 44 | April 25 | Florida State | USA Baseball National Training Complex • Cary, North Carolina | 11–4 | 37–7 | 17–4 |
| 45 | April 26 | Florida State | USA Baseball National Training Complex • Cary, North Carolina | 5–13 | 37–8 | 17–5 |
| 46 | April 27 | Florida State | USA Baseball National Training Complex • Cary, North Carolina | 2–1 | 38–8 | 18–5 |

May (7–2)

| # | Date | Opponent | Site/stadium | Score | Overall record | ACC record |
|---|---|---|---|---|---|---|
| 47 | May 6 | North Florida | USA Baseball National Training Complex • Cary, North Carolina | 9–2 | 39–8 | 18–5 |
| 48 | May 7 | North Florida | USA Baseball National Training Complex • Cary, North Carolina | 11–5 | 40–8 | 18–5 |
| 49 | May 9 | at Virginia | Davenport Field at UVA Baseball Stadium • Charlottesville, Virginia | 9–3 | 41–8 | 19–5 |
| 50 | May 10 | at Virginia | Davenport Field at UVA Baseball Stadium • Charlottesville, Virginia | 5–2 | 42–8 | 20–5 |
| 51 | May 11 | at Virginia | Davenport Field at UVA Baseball Stadium • Charlottesville, Virginia | 4–5 | 42–9 | 20–6 |
| 52 | May 13 | Winthrop | Davenport Field at UVA Baseball Stadium • Charlottesville, Virginia | 4–1 | 43–9 | 20–6 |
| 53 | May 15 | at Miami (FL) | Mark Light Field • Coral Gables, Florida | 2–12 | 43–10 | 20–7 |
| 54 | May 16 | at Miami (FL) | Mark Light Field • Coral Gables, Florida | 10–6 | 44–10 | 21–7 |
| 55 | May 17 | at Miami (FL) | Mark Light Field • Coral Gables, Florida | 12–11 | 45–10 | 22–7 |

Postseason
ACC Tournament (1–2)

| # | Date | Opponent | Site/stadium | Score | Overall record | ACC record |
|---|---|---|---|---|---|---|
| 56 | vs May 21 | vs Virginia | Baseball Grounds of Jacksonville • Jacksonville, Florida | 7–8 | 45–11 | 22–7 |
| 57 | vs May 23 | vs Wake Forest | Baseball Grounds of Jacksonville • Jacksonville, Florida | 2–0 | 46–11 | 22–7 |
| 58 | vs May 24 | vs Florida State | Baseball Grounds of Jacksonville • Jacksonville, Florida | 6–9 | 46–12 | 22–7 |

NCAA Cary Regional (3–0)

| # | Date | Opponent | Site/stadium | Score | Overall record | ACC record |
|---|---|---|---|---|---|---|
| 59 | vs May 30 | vs Mount St. Mary's | USA Baseball National Training Complex • Cary, North Carolina | 16–8 | 47–12 | 22–7 |
| 60 | vs May 31 | vs UNC Wilmington | USA Baseball National Training Complex • Cary, North Carolina | 5–1 | 48–12 | 22–7 |
| 61 | vs June 1 | vs UNC Wilmington | USA Baseball National Training Complex • Cary, North Carolina | 7–3 | 49–12 | 22–7 |

NCAA Cary Super Regional (2–0)

| # | Date | Opponent | Site/stadium | Score | Overall record | ACC record |
|---|---|---|---|---|---|---|
| 62 | vs June 7 | vs Costal Carolina | USA Baseball National Training Complex • Cary, North Carolina | 9–4 | 50–12 | 22–7 |
| 63 | vs June 8 | vs Costal Carolina | USA Baseball National Training Complex • Cary, North Carolina | 14–4 | 51–12 | 22–7 |

College World Series (3–2)

| # | Date | Opponent | Site/stadium | Score | Overall record | ACC record |
|---|---|---|---|---|---|---|
| 64 | June 15 | vs LSU | Johnny Rosenblatt Stadium • Omaha, Nebraska | 8–4 | 52–12 | 22–7 |
| 65 | June 17 | vs Fresno State | Johnny Rosenblatt Stadium • Omaha, Nebraska | 3–5 | 52–13 | 22–7 |
| 66 | June 20 | vs LSU | Johnny Rosenblatt Stadium • Omaha, Nebraska | 7–3 | 53–13 | 22–7 |
| 67 | June 21 | vs Fresno State | Johnny Rosenblatt Stadium • Omaha, Nebraska | 4–3 | 54–13 | 22–7 |
| 68 | June 22 | vs Fresno State | Johnny Rosenblatt Stadium • Omaha, Nebraska | 1–6 | 54–14 | 22–7 |

== Awards and honors ==
Dustin Ackley

- First Team All-ACC
- Third Team All-American Baseball America
- Third Team All-American Collegiate Baseball Newspaper
- Second Team All-Atlantic Region American Baseball Coaches Association
- College World Series All-Tournament Team

Colin Bates

- Freshman All-American Collegiate Baseball Newspaper
- First Team Freshman All-American National Collegiate Baseball Writers Association

Tim Federowicz

- Second Team All-ACC

Tim Fedroff

- First Team All-American American Baseball Coaches Association
- First Team All-American Baseball America
- Second Team All-American Collegiate Baseball Newspaper
- Third Team All-American National Collegiate Baseball Writers Association
- First Team All-Atlantic Region American Baseball Coaches Association
- College World Series All-Tournament Team
- First Team All-ACC

Matt Harvey

- Freshman All-American Collegiate Baseball Newspaper
- Second Team Freshman All-American National Collegiate Baseball Writers Association

Kyle Seager

- Second Team All-American National Collegiate Baseball Writers Association
- Third Team All-American Collegiate Baseball Newspaper
- Second Team All-Atlantic Region American Baseball Coaches Association
- Second Team All-ACC

Alex White

- Second Team All-American American Baseball Coaches Association
- Third Team All-American Baseball America
- Third Team All-American Collegiate Baseball Newspaper
- First Team All-Atlantic Region American Baseball Coaches Association
- College World Series All-Tournament Team
- Atlantic Coast Conference Pitcher of the Year
- First Team All-ACC

Rob Wooten

- Second Team All-Atlantic Region American Baseball Coaches Association
- Second Team All-ACC
