= 2008 Miami Hurricanes baseball team =

American college baseball season

2008 Miami Hurricanes baseball

NCAA Coral Gables Super Regional champions NCAA Coral Gables Regional champions ACC tournament champions Atlantic Coast Conference champions

College World Series, 1–2
- Conference: Atlantic Coast Conference
- Record: 53–11 (23–5 ACC)
- Head coach: Jim Morris (15th year)
- Home stadium: Mark Light Field

2008 Atlantic Coast Conference baseball standings
	Conf.				Overall
Team	W		L	PCT	W		L	PCT
Atlantic
No. 7 Florida State ^{x}‍‍‍^{y}	24	–	6	.800	54	–	14	.794
No. 15 NC State ‍‍‍^{y}	18	–	11	.621	42	–	22	.656
Wake Forest ‍‍‍	13	–	16	.448	25	–	31	.446
Clemson ‍‍‍	11	–	18	.379	31	–	27	.534
Maryland ‍‍‍	9	–	21	.300	30	–	26	.536
Boston College ‍‍‍	9	–	21	.300	26	–	27	.491
Coastal
No. 5 Miami (FL) ^{x}‍‍‡‍^{y}	23	–	5	.821	53	–	11	.828
No. 3 North Carolina ‍‍‍^{y}	22	–	7	.759	54	–	14	.794
No. 24 Georgia Tech^{y} ‍‍‍	16	–	14	.533	41	–	21	.661
Virginia ‍‍‍^{y}	15	–	15	.500	39	–	23	.629
Duke ‍‍‍	10	–	18	.357	37	–	18	.673
Virginia Tech ‍‍‍	6	–	24	.200	23	–	32	.418
x – Division champion ‡ – Tournament champion y – Invited to the NCAA tournament As of June 27, 2008; Rankings from Collegiate Baseball

The 2008 Miami Hurricanes baseball team represented the University of Miami in the 2008 NCAA Division I baseball season. The Hurricanes played their home games at Mark Light Field. The team was coached by Jim Morris in his fifteenth season at Miami. Playing in the Atlantic Coast Conference's Coastal Division, they finished in first place in their division with a record of 23–5, 53–11 overall.

The Hurricanes reached the College World Series, where they finished tied for fifth after dropping an opening round game against eventual runner-up Georgia, defeating Florida State, and being eliminated by semifinalist Stanford.

== Personnel ==
=== Roster ===
2008 Miami Hurricanes roster
Pitchers: 17 - Eric Erickson - Sophomore; 21 - Rene Guerra - Junior; 27 - Chris Hernandez - Freshman; 31 - Enrique Garcia - Senior; 40 - John Housey - Sophomore; 43 - Anthony Nalepa - Sophomore; 44 - Carlos Gutierrez - (redshirt) Junior; 45 - Alex Koronis - Sophomore; 46 - Kyle Bellamy - Sophomore; 46 - Michael Rudman - Sophomore; 47 - David Gutierrez - Sophomore; 48 - Tim Burke - Junior; 48 - Jason Santana - Junior; 49 - PJ Fisher - (redshirt) Junior; 49 - D.J. Swatscheno - Freshman	Catchers: 0 - Harold Levy - Freshman; 22 - Jason Hagerty - Sophomore; 24 - Yasmani Grandal - Freshman; 24 - Ben Vazquez - Sophomore; Outfielders: 7 - Dave DiNatale - Junior; 7 - Adan Severino - Junior; 19 - Dennis Raben - Junior; 31 - Blake Tekotte - Junior; 35 - Joey Terdoslavich - Freshman; 44 - Jonathan Weislow - Sophomore	Infielders: 8 - Ryan Jackson - Sophomore; 17 - Mark Sobolewski - Sophomore; 19 - Yonder Alonso - Junior; 21 - Jemile Weeks - Junior; 35 - Chris Gawenda - (redshirt) Sophomore; 51 - Ryan Perry - Junior; Utility: 28 - Iden Nazario - Freshman

=== Coaches ===
2008 Miami Hurricanes baseball coaching staff
- Jim Morris – Head coach – 15th year

== Schedule and results ==
Legend
Miami win
Miami loss

2008 Miami Hurricanes baseball game log
Regular season

February
Date	Opponent	Rank	Site/stadium	Score	Overall record	ACC record
Feb 22	Cincinnati*	No. 14	Mark Light Field • Coral Gables, FL	W 3–1	1–0	
Feb 23	Cincinnati*	No. 14	Mark Light Field • Coral Gables, FL	W 6–4	2–0	
Feb 24	Cincinnati*	No. 14	Mark Light Field • Coral Gables, FL	W 8–0	3–0	
Feb 26	vs Florida Marlins	No. 14	Roger Dean Stadium • Jupiter, FL	L 2–7	Exh.	
Feb 29	Florida*	No. 14	Mark Light Field • Coral Gables, FL	W 8–4	4–0	

March
Date	Opponent	Rank	Site/stadium	Score	Overall record	ACC record
Mar 1	Florida*	No. 14	Mark Light Field • Coral Gables, FL	W 8–5	5–0	
Mar 2	Florida*	No. 14	Mark Light Field • Coral Gables, FL	L 2–6	5–1	
Mar 4	Lehigh*	No. 16	Mark Light Field • Coral Gables, FL	W 9–2	6–1	
Mar 7	Boston College	No. 16	Mark Light Field • Coral Gables, FL	W 10–7	7–1	1–0
Mar 8	Boston College	No. 16	Mark Light Field • Coral Gables, FL	W 8–3	8–1	2–0
Mar 9	Boston College	No. 16	Mark Light Field • Coral Gables, FL	W 7–1	9–1	3–0
Mar 11	Penn State*	No. 10	Mark Light Field • Coral Gables, FL	W 10–0	10–1	
Mar 12	Maine*	No. 10	Mark Light Field • Coral Gables, FL	W 7–4	11–1	
Mar 14	at NC State	No. 10	Doak Field • Raleigh, NC	W 12–5	12–1	4–0
Mar 15	at NC State	No. 10	Doak Field • Raleigh, NC	W 2–1	13–1	5–0
Mar 16	at NC State	No. 10	Doak Field • Raleigh, NC	L 10–11	13–2	5–1
Mar 18	Cornell*	No. 10	Mark Light Field • Coral Gables, FL	W 20–9	14–2	
Mar 19	NJIT*	No. 10	Mark Light Field • Coral Gables, FL	W 13–1	15–2	
Mar 21	Wake Forest	No. 10	Mark Light Field • Coral Gables, FL	W 17–4	16–2	6–1
Mar 23	Wake Forest	No. 10	Mark Light Field • Coral Gables, FL	W 23–2	17–2	7–1
Mar 25	Bethune–Cookman*	No. 6	Mark Light Field • Coral Gables, FL	W 10–5	18–2	
Mar 26	Bethune–Cookman*	No. 6	Mark Light Field • Coral Gables, FL	W 7–6	19–2	
Mar 28	at Duke	No. 6	Jack Coombs Field • Durham, NC	W 7–5^{10}	20–2	8–1
Mar 29	at Duke	No. 6	Jack Coombs Field • Durham, NC	W 8–1	21–2	9–1

April
Date	Opponent	Rank	Site/stadium	Score	Overall record	ACC record
Apr 1	Florida Atlantic*	No. 3	Mark Light Field • Coral Gables, FL	W 16–7	22–2	
Apr 2	at FIU*	No. 3	FIU Baseball Stadium • Miami, FL	W 13–2	23–2	
Apr 4	Clemson	No. 3	Mark Light Field • Coral Gables, FL	W 6–4	24–2	10–1
Apr 5	Clemson	No. 3	Mark Light Field • Coral Gables, FL	W 15–5	25–2	11–1
Apr 6	Clemson	No. 3	Mark Light Field • Coral Gables, FL	W 7–6	26–2	12–1
Apr 8	Florida Gulf Coast*	No. 2	Mark Light Field • Coral Gables, FL	W 4–^{11}	27–2	
Apr 9	Florida Atlantic*	No. 2	Mark Light Field • Coral Gables, FL	L 3–6	27–3	
Apr 12	at No. 10 Georgia Tech	No. 2	Russ Chandler Stadium • Atlanta, GA	W 10–5	28–3	13–1
Apr 12	at No. 10 Georgia Tech	No. 2	Russ Chandler Stadium • Atlanta, GA	W 15–5	29–3	14–1
Apr 13	at No. 10 Georgia Tech	No. 2	Russ Chandler Stadium • Atlanta, GA	W 9–3	30–3	15–1
Apr 16	at Florida Atlantic	No. 2	FAU Baseball Stadium • Boca Raton, FL	W 12–10	31–3	
Apr 18	at No. 1 Florida State	No. 2	Mike Martin Field at Dick Howser Stadium • Tallahassee, FL	W 11–4	32–3	16–1
Apr 19	at No. 1 Florida State	No. 2	Mike Martin Field at Dick Howser Stadium • Tallahassee, FL	L 5–9	32–4	16–2
Apr 20	at No. 1 Florida State	No. 2	Mike Martin Field at Dick Howser Stadium • Tallahassee, FL	W 11–10	33–4	17–2
Apr 23	FIU*	No. 1	Mark Light Field • Coral Gables, FL	L 3–6	33–5	
Apr 25	No. 16 Virginia	No. 1	Mark Light Field • Coral Gables, FL	W 1–0	34–5	18–2
Apr 26	No. 16 Virginia	No. 1	Mark Light Field • Coral Gables, FL	W 4–3^{10}	35–5	19–2
Apr 27	No. 16 Virginia	No. 1	Mark Light Field • Coral Gables, FL	W 10–0	36–5	20–2

May
Date	Opponent	Rank	Site/stadium	Score	Overall record	ACC record
May 2	Saint Mary's*	No. 1	Mark Light Field • Coral Gables, FL	W 10–6	37–5	
May 3	Saint Mary's*	No. 1	Mark Light Field • Coral Gables, FL	W 5–0	38–5	
May 4	Saint Mary's*	No. 1	Mark Light Field • Coral Gables, FL	W 15–3	39–5	
May 9	at Virginia Tech	No. 1	English Field • Blacksburg, VA	W 12–4	40–5	21–2
May 10	at Virginia Tech	No. 1	English Field • Blacksburg, VA	L 6–7	40–6	21–3
May 10	at Virginia Tech	No. 1	English Field • Blacksburg, VA	W 9–2	41–6	22–3
May 13	North Florida*	No. 1	Mark Light Field • Coral Gables, FL	W 5–2	42–6	
May 15	No. 2 North Carolina	No. 1	Mark Light Field • Coral Gables, FL	W 12–2	43–6	23–3
May 16	No. 2 North Carolina	No. 1	Mark Light Field • Coral Gables, FL	L 6–10	43–7	23–4
May 17	No. 2 North Carolina	No. 1	Mark Light Field • Coral Gables, FL	L 11–12	43–8	23–5

Postseason

ACC Tournament
Date	Opponent	Seed	Site/stadium	Score	Overall record	ACCT Record
May 21	(8) Clemson	No. 2 (1)	Baseball Grounds of Jacksonville • Jacksonville, FL	W 7–1	44–8	1–0
May 22	No. 28 (5) Georgia Tech	No. 2 (1)	Baseball Grounds of Jacksonville • Jacksonville, FL	W 15–12	45–8	2–0
May 24	No. 22 (4) NC State	No. 2 (1)	Baseball Grounds of Jacksonville • Jacksonville, FL	W 5–2	46–8	3–0
May 25	(6) Virginia	No. 2 (1)	Baseball Grounds of Jacksonville • Jacksonville, FL	W 8–4	47–8	4–0

NCAA Coral Gables Regional
Date	Opponent	Seed	Site/stadium	Score	Overall record	NCAAT record
May 30	(4) Bethune–Cookman	No. 1 (1)	Mark Light Field • Coral Gables, FL	W 7–4	48–8	1–0
May 31	No. 14 (2) Missouri	No. 1 (1)	Mark Light Field • Coral Gables, FL	W 6–5	49–8	2–0
June 1	(3) Ole Miss	No. 1 (1)	Mark Light Field • Coral Gables, FL	W 11–2	50–8	3–0

NCAA Coral Gables Super Regional
Date	Opponent	Seed	Site/stadium	Score	Overall record	SR Record
June 6	No. 14 Arizona	No. 1 (1)	Mark Light Field • Coral Gables, FL	L 3–6	50–9	0–1
June 7	No. 14 Arizona	No. 1 (1)	Mark Light Field • Coral Gables, FL	W 14–10	51–9	1–1
June 8	No. 14 Arizona	No. 1 (1)	Mark Light Field • Coral Gables, FL	W 4–2	52–9	2–1

College World Series
Date	Opponent	Seed	Site/stadium	Score	Overall record	CWS record
June 14	No. 6 (8) Georgia	No. 1 (1)	Johnny Rosenblatt Stadium • Omaha, NE	L 4–7	52–10	0–1
June 16	No. 3 (4) Florida State	No. 1 (1)	Johnny Rosenblatt Stadium • Omaha, NE	W 7–5	53–10	1–1
June 18	No. 7 Stanford	No. 1 (1)	Johnny Rosenblatt Stadium • Omaha, NE	L 3–8	53–11	1–2
