= 2008 Florida State Seminoles baseball team =

American college baseball season

2008 Florida State Seminoles baseball

ACC Atlantic Division champions NCAA Tallahassee Regional champions NCAA Tallahassee Super Regional champions

College World Series, 0–2
- Conference: Atlantic Coast Conference
- Record: 54–14 (24–6 ACC)
- Head coach: Mike Martin (29th year)
- Home stadium: Dick Howser Stadium

2008 Atlantic Coast Conference baseball standings
	Conf.				Overall
Team	W		L	PCT	W		L	PCT
Atlantic
No. 7 Florida State ^{x}‍‍‍^{y}	24	–	6	.800	54	–	14	.794
No. 15 NC State ‍‍‍^{y}	18	–	11	.621	42	–	22	.656
Wake Forest ‍‍‍	13	–	16	.448	25	–	31	.446
Clemson ‍‍‍	11	–	18	.379	31	–	27	.534
Maryland ‍‍‍	9	–	21	.300	30	–	26	.536
Boston College ‍‍‍	9	–	21	.300	26	–	27	.491
Coastal
No. 5 Miami (FL) ^{x}‍‍‡‍^{y}	23	–	5	.821	53	–	11	.828
No. 3 North Carolina ‍‍‍^{y}	22	–	7	.759	54	–	14	.794
No. 24 Georgia Tech^{y} ‍‍‍	16	–	14	.533	41	–	21	.661
Virginia ‍‍‍^{y}	15	–	15	.500	39	–	23	.629
Duke ‍‍‍	10	–	18	.357	37	–	18	.673
Virginia Tech ‍‍‍	6	–	24	.200	23	–	32	.418
x – Division champion ‡ – Tournament champion y – Invited to the NCAA tournament As of June 27, 2008; Rankings from Collegiate Baseball

The 2008 Florida State Seminoles baseball team represented Florida State University in the 2008 NCAA Division I baseball season. The Seminoles played their home games at Dick Howser Stadium, and played as part of the Atlantic Coast Conference. The team was coached by Mike Martin in his twenty-ninth season as head coach at Florida State.

The Seminoles reached the College World Series, their eighteenth appearance in Omaha, where they finished tied for seventh place after losing a game to Stanford and another to Miami (FL).

== Personnel ==
=== Roster ===
2008 Florida State Seminoles roster
Pitchers: 10 - Luke Smierciak - Freshman; 14 - Ryan Strauss - Senior; 16 - Bo O'Dell - Junior; 17 - Mark Peterson - Freshman; 20 - Calvin Brutus - Junior; 21 - Geoff Parker - Freshman; 22 - John Gast - Freshman; 23 - Taiwan Easterling - Freshman; 25 - Mike McGee - Freshman; 26 - Jimmy Marshall - Junior; 27 - Elih Villanueva - Junior; 28 - Tyler Everett - Freshman; 30 - Ben Francis - Sophomore; 30 - Michael Martinez - Freshman; 32 - Matt Fairel - Sophomore; 33 - Trent Jarvis - (redshirt) Senior; 35 - Ryan Vigue - Freshman; 51 - Scott Thorson - (redshirt) Freshman	Catchers: 7 - Parker Brunelle - Freshman; 8 - Buster Posey - Junior; 19 - Matt Kane - Freshman; 31 - John Doolittle - Freshman; Infielders: 1 - Stuart Tapley - Freshman; 3 - Tony Delmonico - Junior; 5 - Jack Posey - Freshman; 6 - Tommy Oravetz - Junior; 13 - Jason Stidham - Sophomore; 20 - Nick Vickerson - Freshman; 23 - Nick Polston - Junior; 24 - Dennis Guinn - Senior; 38 - Stephen Cardullo - Sophomore	Outfielders: 2 - Ohmed Danesh - Sophomore; 9 - Ruairi O'Connor - (redshirt) Junior; 15 - Tyler Holt - Freshman; 37 - Neil Malpass - (redshirt) Senior; 46 - Jack Rye - Senior

=== Coaches ===
2008 Florida State Seminoles baseball coaching staff
- Mike Martin - Head coach - 29th year
- Jamey Shouppe - Assistant coach - 19th year
- Mike Martin Jr. - Assistant coach - 11th year
- Rod Delmonico - Volunteer assistant coach - 1st year

== Schedule and results ==
Legend
Florida State win
Florida State loss

2008 Florida State Seminoles baseball game log
Regular season

February
Date	Opponent	Rank	Site/stadium	Score	Overall record	ACC record
Feb 23	Duquesne*	No. 12	Dick Howser Stadium • Tallahassee, FL	W 14–3^{7}	1–0	
Feb 23	Duquesne*	No. 12	Dick Howser Stadium • Tallahassee, FL	W 15–3^{7}	2–0	
Feb 24	Duquesne*	No. 12	Dick Howser Stadium • Tallahassee, FL	W 15–3^{8}	3–0	
Feb 28	at Auburn*	No. 12	Plainsman Park • Auburn, AL	W 7–5	4–0	
Feb 29	at Auburn*	No. 12	Plainsman Park • Auburn, AL	W 6–5	5–0	

March
Date	Opponent	Rank	Site/stadium	Score	Overall record	ACC record
Mar 1	Auburn*	No. 12	Dick Howser Stadium • Tallahassee, FL	W 4–3	6–0	
Mar 2	Auburn*	No. 12	Dick Howser Stadium • Tallahassee, FL	W 10–1	7–0	
Mar 4	UNC Asheville*	No. 8	Dick Howser Stadium • Tallahassee, FL	W 11–4	8–0	
Mar 5	UNC Asheville*	No. 8	Dick Howser Stadium • Tallahassee, FL	W 10–5	9–0	
Mar 8	Maryland	No. 8	Dick Howser Stadium • Tallahassee, FL	W 5–4	10–0	1–0
Mar 8	Maryland	No. 8	Dick Howser Stadium • Tallahassee, FL	W 16–0	11–0	2–0
Mar 9	Maryland	No. 8	Dick Howser Stadium • Tallahassee, FL	W 9–8	12–0	3–0
Mar 12	Georgia*	No. 3	Dick Howser Stadium • Tallahassee, FL	L 10–13	12–1	
Mar 12	Georgia*	No. 3	Dick Howser Stadium • Tallahassee, FL	W 8–3	13–1	
Mar 14	No. 11 Georgia Tech	No. 3	Dick Howser Stadium • Tallahassee, FL	W 8–7	14–1	4–0
Mar 15	No. 11 Georgia Tech	No. 3	Dick Howser Stadium • Tallahassee, FL	W 11–2	15–1	5–0
Mar 16	No. 11 Georgia Tech	No. 3	Dick Howser Stadium • Tallahassee, FL	W 17–8	16–1	6–0
Mar 18	at No. 29 Florida*	No. 3	Alfred A. McKethan Stadium • Gainesville, FL	L 1–6	16–2	
Mar 21	at Virginia Tech	No. 3	English Field • Blacksburg, VA	W 9–4	17–2	7–0
Mar 22	at Virginia Tech	No. 3	English Field • Blacksburg, VA	W 12–11	18–2	8–0
Mar 23	at Virginia Tech	No. 3	English Field • Blacksburg, VA	W 18–12	19–2	9–0
Mar 25	Stetson*	No. 2	Dick Howser Stadium • Tallahassee, FL	W 11–2	20–2	
Mar 26	Stetson*	No. 2	Dick Howser Stadium • Tallahassee, FL	W 19–3	21–2	
Mar 28	at Wake Forest	No. 2	Gene Hooks Stadium • Winston-Salem, NC	W 21–2	22–2	10–0
Mar 29	at Wake Forest	No. 2	Gene Hooks Stadium • Winston-Salem, NC	L 2–4	22–3	10–1
Mar 30	at Wake Forest	No. 2	Gene Hooks Stadium • Winston-Salem, NC	W 3–2^{11}	23–3	11–1

April
Date	Opponent	Rank	Site/stadium	Score	Overall record	ACC record
Apr 1	vs No. 17 Florida*	No. 2	Baseball Grounds of Jacksonville • Jacksonville, FL	W 10–2	24–3	
Apr 2	at Jacksonville*	No. 2	John Sessions Stadium • Jacksonville, FL	W 7–5	25–3	
Apr 4	No. 16 Virginia	No. 2	Dick Howser Stadium • Tallahassee, FL	W 10–3	26–3	12–1
Apr 6	No. 16 Virginia	No. 2	Dick Howser Stadium • Tallahassee, FL	W 3–2^{10}	27–3	13–1
Apr 6	No. 16 Virginia	No. 2	Dick Howser Stadium • Tallahassee, FL	W 3–2^{10}	28–3	14–1
Apr 11	at Boston College	No. 1	Eddie Pellagrini Diamond • Chestnut Hill, MA	W 8–6	29–3	15–1
Apr 11	at Boston College	No. 1	Eddie Pellagrini Diamond • Chestnut Hill, MA	W 4–3	30–3	16–1
Apr 12	at Boston College	No. 1	Eddie Pellagrini Diamond • Chestnut Hill, MA	W 17–2	31–3	17–1
Apr 15	Florida*	No. 1	Dick Howser Stadium • Tallahassee, FL	W 4–2	32–3	
Apr 16	North Florida*	No. 1	Dick Howser Stadium • Tallahassee, FL	W 10–2	33–3	
Apr 18	No. 2 Miami (FL)	No. 1	Dick Howser Stadium • Tallahassee, FL	L 4–11	33–4	17–2
Apr 19	No. 2 Miami (FL)	No. 1	Dick Howser Stadium • Tallahassee, FL	W 9–5	34–4	18–2
Apr 20	No. 2 Miami (FL)	No. 1	Dick Howser Stadium • Tallahassee, FL	L 10–11^{7}	34–5	18–3
Apr 25	at No. 3 North Carolina	No. 2	Boshamer Stadium • Chapel Hill, NC	L 4–11	34–6	18–4
Apr 26	at No. 3 North Carolina	No. 2	Boshamer Stadium • Chapel Hill, NC	W 13–5	35–6	19–4
Apr 27	at No. 3 North Carolina	No. 2	Boshamer Stadium • Chapel Hill, NC	L 1–2^{11}	35–7	19–5
Apr 29	at Stetson*	No. 4	Melching Field at Conrad Park • DeLand, FL	W 13–3	36–7	
Apr 30	at Stetson*	No. 4	Melching Field at Conrad Park • DeLand, FL	W 6–3	37–7	

May
Date	Opponent	Rank	Site/stadium	Score	Overall record	ACC record
May 3	at Clemson	No. 4	Doug Kingsmore Stadium • Clemson, SC	W 9–8^{10}	38–7	20–5
May 4	at Clemson	No. 4	Doug Kingsmore Stadium • Clemson, SC	W 13–4	39–7	21–5
May 5	at Clemson	No. 4	Doug Kingsmore Stadium • Clemson, SC	W 4–2	40–7	22–5
May 7	Jacksonville*	No. 4	Dick Howser Stadium • Tallahassee, FL	L 6–7	40–8	
May 9	Savannah State*	No. 4	Dick Howser Stadium • Tallahassee, FL	W 23–4^{7}	41–8	
May 10	Savannah State*	No. 4	Dick Howser Stadium • Tallahassee, FL	W 19–2^{7}	42–8	
May 11	Savannah State*	No. 4	Dick Howser Stadium • Tallahassee, FL	W 24–4^{7}	43–8	
May 12	Savannah State*	No. 4	Dick Howser Stadium • Tallahassee, FL	W 10–0^{7}	44–8	
May 15	No. 21 NC State	No. 4	Dick Howser Stadium • Tallahassee, FL	L 2–12	44–9	22–6
May 16	No. 21 NC State	No. 4	Dick Howser Stadium • Tallahassee, FL	W 1–0	45–9	23–6
May 17	No. 21 NC State	No. 4	Dick Howser Stadium • Tallahassee, FL	W 8–1	46–9	24–6

Postseason

ACC Tournament
Date	Opponent	Rank	Site/stadium	Score	Overall record	ACCT Record
May 21	(7) Wake Forest	No. 4 (2)	Baseball Grounds of Jacksonville • Jacksonville, FL	W 8–3	47–9	1–0
May 23	(6) Virginia	No. 4 (2)	Baseball Grounds of Jacksonville • Jacksonville, FL	L 3–5	47–10	1–1
May 24	No. 1 (3) North Carolina	No. 4 (2)	Baseball Grounds of Jacksonville • Jacksonville, FL	W 9–6	48–10	2–1

NCAA Tallahassee Regional
Date	Opponent	Rank	Site/stadium	Score	Overall record	Reg Record
May 30	(4) Bucknell	No. 3 (1)	Dick Howser Stadium • Tallahassee, FL	L 0–8	48–11	0–1
May 31	No. 27 (2) Florida	No. 3 (1)	Dick Howser Stadium • Tallahassee, FL	W 17–11	49–11	1–1
June 1	(4) Bucknell	No. 3 (1)	Dick Howser Stadium • Tallahassee, FL	W 24–9	50–11	2–1
June 1	(3) Tulane	No. 3 (1)	Dick Howser Stadium • Tallahassee, FL	W 17–8	51–11	3–1
June 2	(3) Tulane	No. 3 (1)	Dick Howser Stadium • Tallahassee, FL	W 16–7	52–11	4–1

NCAA Tallahassee Super Regional
Date	Opponent	Rank	Site/stadium	Score	Overall record	SR Record
June 6	No. 11 Wichita State	No. 3 (4)	Dick Howser Stadium • Tallahassee, FL	L 7–10	52–12	1–1
June 7	No. 11 Wichita State	No. 3 (4)	Dick Howser Stadium • Tallahassee, FL	W 14–4	53–12	1–1
June 8	No. 11 Wichita State	No. 3 (4)	Dick Howser Stadium • Tallahassee, FL	W 11–4	54–12	2–1

College World Series
Date	Opponent	Rank	Site/stadium	Score	Overall record	CWS record
June 14	No. 7 Stanford	No. 3 (4)	Johnny Rosenblatt Stadium • Omaha, NE	L 5–16	54–13	0–1
June 16	No. 1 (1) Miami (FL)	No. 3 (4)	Johnny Rosenblatt Stadium • Omaha, NE	L 5–7	54–14	0–2

== Ranking movements ==
Ranking movements Legend: ██ Increase in ranking ██ Decrease in ranking — = Not ranked
	Week																	
Poll	Pre	1	2	3	4	5	6	7	8	9	10	11	12	13	14	15	16	Final
Coaches' Poll	12	12*	8	4	3	2	3	2	2	2	3	3	3	3	3	3*	3*	8
Baseball America	—	—	20	14	10	8	6	3	3	3	5	4	4	4	2	2	2	7
Collegiate Baseball	12	12	8	3	3	2	2	1	1	2	4	4	4	4	3	3	3	7
NCBWA	13	11	9	6	5	4	3	2	2	2	3	3	3	4	2	3	3	8
