= 2008 Stanford Cardinal baseball team =

American college baseball season

2008 Stanford Cardinal baseball

Palo Alto Regional champions Fullerton Super Regional champions

College World Series, 4th
- Conference: Pacific 10 Conference

Ranking
- Coaches: No. 4
- CB: No. 4
- Record: 41–24 (14–10 Pac-10)
- Head coach: Mark Marquess (32nd season)
- Assistant coach: Dave Nakama (9th season)
- Hitting coach: Dean Stotz (32nd season)
- Pitching coach: Jeff Austin (1st season)
- Home stadium: Sunken Diamond

2008 Pacific-10 Conference baseball standings
| | Conf. | | | | | | Overall |
| Team | W | | L | | T | PCT | W | | L | | T | PCT |
|---|---|---|---|---|---|---|---|---|---|---|---|---|
| No. 9 Arizona State ‍†‍‍^{y} | 16 | – | 8 | – | 0 | .667 | 49 | – | 13 | – | 0 | .790 |
| No. 4 Stanford ‍‍‍ | 14 | – | 10 | – | 0 | .583 | 41 | – | 24 | – | 2 | .627 |
| UCLA ‍‍‍^{y} | 13 | – | 11 | – | 0 | .542 | 33 | – | 27 | – | 0 | .550 |
| No. 13 Arizona ‍‍‍^{y} | 12 | – | 12 | – | 0 | .500 | 42 | – | 19 | – | 0 | .689 |
| California ‍‍‍ | 12 | – | 12 | – | 0 | .500 | 33 | – | 21 | – | 2 | .607 |
| Washington ‍‍‍ | 11 | – | 13 | – | 0 | .458 | 33 | – | 22 | – | 0 | .600 |
| Oregon State ‍‍‍^{y} | 11 | – | 13 | – | 0 | .458 | 28 | – | 24 | – | 0 | .538 |
| Southern California ‍‍‍ | 11 | – | 13 | – | 0 | .458 | 28 | – | 28 | – | 0 | .500 |
| Washington State ‍‍‍ | 8 | – | 16 | – | 0 | .333 | 30 | – | 26 | – | 0 | .536 |
† – Conference champion y – Invited to the NCAA tournament As of June 30, 2007; Rankings from Collegiate Baseball

The 2008 Stanford Cardinal baseball team represented Stanford University in the 2008 NCAA Division I baseball season. The Cardinal played their home games at Sunken Diamond. The team was coached by Mark Marquess in his 32nd year at Stanford.

The Cardinal won the Palo Alto Regional and the Fullerton Super Regional to advanced to the College World Series, where they were defeated by the Georgia Bulldogs.

== Roster ==
2008 Stanford Cardinal baseball team
Players
Coaches

| # | Pos. | Name | B/T | Height | Weight | Year | Home town |
|---|---|---|---|---|---|---|---|
| 1 | OF | Jeff Whitlow | R/R | 5 ft 11 in (1.8 m) | 195 lb (88 kg) | Jr | Southfield, Michigan |
| 2 | INF | Adam Gaylord | R/R | 6 ft 3 in (1.91 m) | 200 lb (91 kg) | So | La Mirada, California |
| 3 | INF | J. J. Jelmini | R/R | 6 ft 1 in (1.85 m) | 205 lb (93 kg) | Jr | Fresno, California |
| 4 | | Adam Yount | L/R | 6 ft 0 in (1.83 m) | 185 lb (84 kg) | Jr | Scottsdale, Arizona |
| 5 | | Zach Jones | R/R | 5 ft 11 in (1.8 m) | 180 lb (82 kg) | Fr | Draper, Utah |
| 6 | INF | Jake Schlander | R/R | 6 ft 2 in (1.88 m) | 185 lb (84 kg) | Fr | Scottsdale, Arizona |
| 7 | OF | Joey August | L/L | 6 ft 1 in (1.85 m) | 205 lb (93 kg) | Jr | Salem, Oregon |
| 11 | OF | Dave Giuliani | S/R | 5 ft 11 in (1.8 m) | 195 lb (88 kg) | Fr | Thorofare, New Jersey |
| 12 | OF | Wande Olabisi | R/R | 6 ft 0 in (1.83 m) | 205 lb (93 kg) | So | Houston, Texas |
| 13 | INF | Colin Walsh | S/R | 6 ft 1 in (1.85 m) | 185 lb (84 kg) | Fr | San Diego, California |
| 14 | | Brendan Domaracki | L/R | 6 ft 2 in (1.88 m) | 190 lb (86 kg) | Sr | Tampa, Florida |
| 15 | C | Jason Castro | L/R | 6 ft 3 in (1.91 m) | 210 lb (95 kg) | Jr | Castro Valley, California |
| 16 | INF | Cord Phelps | R/R | 6 ft 2 in (1.88 m) | 200 lb (91 kg) | Jr | Santa Barbara, California |
| 17 | RHP | Cory Bannister | R/R | 5 ft 11 in (1.8 m) | 180 lb (82 kg) | So | Paradise Valley, Arizona |
| 18 | | Sean Ratliff | /L | 6 ft 3 in (1.91 m) | 225 lb (102 kg) | Jr | Longmont, Colorado |
| 19 | RHP | Erik Davis | R/R | 6 ft 4 in (1.93 m) | 200 lb (91 kg) | Sr | Mountain View, California |
| 20 | RHP | Jeffrey Inman | R/R | 6 ft 2 in (1.88 m) | 185 lb (84 kg) | So | Bakersfield, California |
| 21 | LHP | Jeremy Bleich | L/L | 6 ft 2 in (1.88 m) | 190 lb (86 kg) | Jr | Metairie, Louisiana |
| 22 | OF | Stephen Brown | R/R | 6 ft 4 in (1.93 m) | 225 lb (102 kg) | Jr | Visalia, California |
| 23 | RHP | Brandt Walker | R/R | 6 ft 2 in (1.88 m) | 180 lb (82 kg) | So | Austin, Texas |
| 24 | OF | Toby Gerhart | R/R | 6 ft 1 in (1.85 m) | 230 lb (104 kg) | So | Norco, California |
| 25 | C | Brent Milleville | R/R | 6 ft 4 in (1.93 m) | 245 lb (111 kg) | Jr | Wichita, Kansas |
| 26 | RHP | Drew Storen | R/R | 6 ft 2 in (1.88 m) | 175 lb (79 kg) | Fr | Brownsburg, Indiana |
| 27 | LHP | Blake Hancock | L/L | 6 ft 1 in (1.85 m) | 185 lb (84 kg) | Jr | Kingwood, Texas |
| 28 | RHP | Danny Sandbrink | R/R | 6 ft 1 in (1.85 m) | 195 lb (88 kg) | Fr | St. Louis, Missouri |
| 29 | | Ben Clowe | R/R | 6 ft 0 in (1.83 m) | 190 lb (86 kg) | Fr | Jacksonville, Florida |
| 30 | INF | Jonathan Kaskow | S/R | 6 ft 4 in (1.93 m) | 215 lb (98 kg) | Fr | Coppell, Texas |
| 31 | OF | Kellen McColl | R/R | 6 ft 2 in (1.88 m) | 215 lb (98 kg) | Fr | Los Altos, California |
| 33 | INF | Randy Molina | L/R | 6 ft 4 in (1.93 m) | 220 lb (100 kg) | Sr | South Gate, California |
| 34 | LHP | Tom Stilson | L/L | 6 ft 4 in (1.93 m) | 215 lb (98 kg) | Jr | Ozark, Missouri |
| 36 | RHP | Andrew Clauson | R/R | 6 ft 2 in (1.88 m) | 190 lb (86 kg) | So | Yakima, Washington |
| 37 | | Michael Marshall | R/R | 6 ft 3 in (1.91 m) | 225 lb (102 kg) | Fr | El Paso, Texas |
| 38 | RHP | Rex Petrill | R/R | 6 ft 3 in (1.91 m) | 230 lb (104 kg) | Sr | Los Altos, California |
| 39 | RHP | David Stringer | R/R | 6 ft 2 in (1.88 m) | 190 lb (86 kg) | Sr | Palo Alto, California |
| 40 | RHP | Max Fearnow | R/R | 6 ft 4 in (1.93 m) | 205 lb (93 kg) | Jr | Omaha, Nebraska |
| 41 | | Rey Saldana | R/R | 5 ft 10 in (1.78 m) | 180 lb (82 kg) | Jr | San Antonio, Texas |
| 42 | OF | Kellen Kiilsgaard | L/L | 6 ft 2 in (1.88 m) | 230 lb (104 kg) | Fr | Auburn, Washington |
| 43 | C | Kirk Erickson | L/R | 5 ft 11 in (1.8 m) | 200 lb (91 kg) | So | Santa Rosa, California |
| 44 | RHP | Alex Pracher | R/R | 6 ft 2 in (1.88 m) | 175 lb (79 kg) | Fr | Marlton, New Jersey |
| 46 | RHP | Billy Vernon | R/R | 6 ft 1 in (1.85 m) | 185 lb (84 kg) | Fr | Fort Washington, Pennsylvania |
| 47 | RHP | Will Krasne | R/R | 6 ft 0 in (1.83 m) | 195 lb (88 kg) | So | Washington, D.C. |
| 48 | RHP | Kyle Thompson | R/R | 6 ft 1 in (1.85 m) | 174 lb (79 kg) | So | Northridge, California |
| 49 | INF | Brian Moon | S/R | 6 ft 2 in (1.88 m) | 190 lb (86 kg) | So | Glendale, California |
| 50 | RHP | Carey Schwartz | R/R | 6 ft 2 in (1.88 m) | 165 lb (75 kg) | Fr | Palo Alto, California |
| 51 | LHP | Michael De Groot | L/L | 6 ft 0 in (1.83 m) | 170 lb (77 kg) | Fr | Castro Valley, California |

Head coach

9 Mark Marquess

Assistant coach(es)

Hitting coach(es)

32 Dean Stotz

Base coach(es)

10 Dave Nakama

Pitching coach(es)

8 Jeff Austin

Legend

- (C) Team captain
- (S) Suspended
- (I) Ineligible
- Injured
- Current redshirt

Roster
Last update: January 23, 2021

== Schedule ==
2008 Stanford Cardinal baseball game log
Regular season
February (4–2)

| # | Date | Opponent | Site/stadium | Score | Overall record | Pac-10 record |
|---|---|---|---|---|---|---|
| 1 | February 22 | Nebraska | Sunken Diamond • Stanford, California | 17–1 | 1–0 | – |
| 2 | February 22 | Nebraska | Sunken Diamond • Stanford, California | 2–9 | 1–1 | – |
| 3 | February 24 | Nebraska | Sunken Diamond • Stanford, California | 4–2 | 2–1 | – |
| 4 | February 25 | Saint Mary's | Sunken Diamond • Stanford, California | 2–4 | 2–2 | – |
| 5 | February 26 | Nevada | Sunken Diamond • Stanford, California | 4–3 | 3–2 | – |
| 6 | February 28 | Cal State Fullerton | Sunken Diamond • Stanford, California | 12–5 | 4–2 | – |

March (9–5–1)

| # | Date | Opponent | Site/stadium | Score | Overall record | Pac-10 record |
|---|---|---|---|---|---|---|
| 7 | March 1 | Cal State Fullerton | Sunken Diamond • Stanford, California | 11–7 | 5–2 | – |
| 8 | March 2 | Cal State Fullerton | Sunken Diamond • Stanford, California | 6–5 | 6–2 | – |
| 9 | March 4 | at California | Evans Diamond • Berkeley, California | 3–8 | 6–3 | – |
| 10 | March 5 | at Saint Mary's | Louis Guisto Field • Moraga, California | 7–7 | 6–3–1 | – |
| 11 | March 7 | at Texas | UFCU Disch–Falk Field • Austin, Texas | 2–5 | 6–4–1 | – |
| 12 | March 8 | at Texas | UFCU Disch–Falk Field • Austin, Texas | 6–5 | 7–4–1 | – |
| 13 | March 9 | at Texas | UFCU Disch–Falk Field • Austin, Texas | 12–9 | 8–4–1 | – |
| 14 | March 21 | Pacific | Sunken Diamond • Stanford, California | 6–10 | 8–5–1 | – |
| 15 | March 22 | at Pacific | Klein Family Field • Stockton, California | 7–3 | 9–5–1 | – |
| 16 | March 24 | at Pacific | Klein Family Field • Stockton, California | 14–0 | 10–5–1 | – |
| 17 | March 25 | at Sacramento State | John Smith Field • Sacramento, California | 3–5 | 10–6–1 | – |
| 18 | March 28 | Washington State | Sunken Diamond • Stanford, California | 4–10 | 10–7–1 | 0–1 |
| 19 | March 29 | Washington State | Sunken Diamond • Stanford, California | 7–3 | 11–7–1 | 1–1 |
| 20 | March 30 | Washington State | Sunken Diamond • Stanford, California | 8–2 | 12–7–1 | 2–1 |
| 21 | March 31 | Long Beach State | Sunken Diamond • Stanford, California | 9–3 | 13–7–1 | 2–1 |

April (10–6)

| # | Date | Opponent | Site/stadium | Score | Overall record | Pac-10 record |
|---|---|---|---|---|---|---|
| 22 | April 1 | Hawaii | Sunken Diamond • Stanford, California | 2–5 | 13–8–1 | 2–1 |
| 23 | April 4 | Arizona State | Sunken Diamond • Stanford, California | 4–6 | 13–9–1 | 2–2 |
| 24 | April 5 | Arizona State | Sunken Diamond • Stanford, California | 12–2 | 14–9–1 | 3–2 |
| 25 | April 6 | Arizona State | Sunken Diamond • Stanford, California | 10–2 | 15–9–1 | 4–2 |
| 26 | April 7 | at California | Evans Diamond • Berkeley, California | 5–5 | 15–9–2 | 4–2 |
| 27 | April 9 | UC Davis | Sunken Diamond • Stanford, California | 8–9 | 15–10–2 | 4–2 |
| 28 | April 11 | at Oregon State | Goss Stadium at Coleman Field • Corvallis, Oregon | 9–10 | 15–11–2 | 4–3 |
| 29 | April 12 | at Oregon State | Goss Stadium at Coleman Field • Corvallis, Oregon | 6–4 | 16–11–2 | 5–3 |
| 30 | April 13 | at Oregon State | Goss Stadium at Coleman Field • Corvallis, Oregon | 4–2 | 17–11–2 | 6–3 |
| 31 | April 14 | Santa Clara | Stephen Schott Stadium • Santa Clara, California | 3–1 | 18–11–2 | 6–3 |
| 32 | April 16 | San Francisco | Sunken Diamond • Stanford, California | 11–10 | 19–11–2 | 6–3 |
| 33 | April 18 | at UCLA | Jackie Robinson Stadium • Los Angeles, California | 4–1 | 20–11–2 | 7–3 |
| 34 | April 19 | at UCLA | Jackie Robinson Stadium • Los Angeles, California | 6–1 | 21–11–2 | 8–3 |
| 35 | April 20 | at UCLA | Jackie Robinson Stadium • Los Angeles, California | 2–8 | 21–12–2 | 8–4 |
| 36 | April 21 | at Santa Clara | Stephen Schott Stadium • Santa Clara, California | 13–6 | 22–12–2 | 8–4 |
| 37 | April 23 | Saint Mary's | Sunken Diamond • Stanford, California | 7–4 | 23–12–2 | 8–4 |
| 38 | April 25 | Southern California | Sunken Diamond • Stanford, California | 4–0 | 24–12–2 | 9–4 |
| 39 | April 26 | Southern California | Sunken Diamond • Stanford, California | 26–5 | 25–12–2 | 10–4 |
| 40 | April 27 | Southern California | Sunken Diamond • Stanford, California | 9–10 | 25–13–2 | 10–5 |
| 41 | April 28 | at Santa Clara | Stephen Schott Stadium • Santa Clara, California | 9–10 | 25–14–2 | 10–5 |
| 42 | April 30 | at UC Davis | Dobbins Stadium • Davis, California | 8–10 | 25–15–2 | 10–5 |

May (9–5)

| # | Date | Opponent | Site/stadium | Score | Overall record | Pac-10 record |
|---|---|---|---|---|---|---|
| 43 | May 3 | San Jose State | Sunken Diamond • Stanford, California | 9–1 | 26–15–2 | 10–5 |
| 44 | May 4 | at San Jose State | San Jose Municipal Stadium • San Jose, California | 17–6 | 27–15–2 | 10–5 |
| 45 | May 5 | Pacific | Sunken Diamond • Stanford, California | 7–2 | 28–15–2 | 10–5 |
| 46 | May 6 | at San Francisco | Dante Benedetti Diamond at Max Ulrich Field • San Francisco, California | 9–13 | 28–16–2 | 10–5 |
| 47 | May 9 | California | Sunken Diamond • Stanford, California | 3–4 | 28–17–2 | 10–6 |
| 48 | May 10 | California | Sunken Diamond • Stanford, California | 2–5 | 28–18–2 | 10–7 |
| 49 | May 11 | California | Sunken Diamond • Stanford, California | 8–5 | 29–18–2 | 11–7 |
| 50 | May 12 | Santa Clara | Sunken Diamond • Stanford, California | 15–4 | 30–18–2 | 11–7 |
| 51 | May 17 | at Arizona | Jerry Kindall Field at Frank Sancet Stadium • Tucson, Arizona | 6–9 | 30–19–2 | 11–8 |
| 52 | May 18 | at Arizona | Jerry Kindall Field at Frank Sancet Stadium • Tucson, Arizona | 8–5 | 31–19–2 | 12–8 |
| 53 | May 19 | at Arizona | Jerry Kindall Field at Frank Sancet Stadium • Tucson, Arizona | 11–15 | 31–20–2 | 12–9 |
| 54 | May 23 | at Washington | Husky Ballpark • Seattle, Washington | 9–4 | 32–20–2 | 13–9 |
| 55 | May 24 | at Washington | Husky Ballpark • Seattle, Washington | 8–5 | 33–20–2 | 14–9 |
| 56 | May 25 | at Washington | Husky Ballpark • Seattle, Washington | 4–7 | 33–21–2 | 14–10 |

Postseason
NCAA Palo Alto Regional (4–1)

| # | Date | Opponent | Site/stadium | Score | Overall record | Pac-10 record |
|---|---|---|---|---|---|---|
| 57 | May 30 | UC Davis | Sunken Diamond • Stanford, California | 2–4 | 33–22–2 | 14–10 |
| 58 | May 31 | Arkansas | Sunken Diamond • Stanford, California | 5–1 | 34–22–2 | 14–10 |
| 59 | June 1 | UC Davis | Sunken Diamond • Stanford, California | 8–4 | 35–22–2 | 14–10 |
| 60 | June 1 | Pepperdine | Sunken Diamond • Stanford, California | 13–1 | 36–22–2 | 14–10 |
| 61 | June 2 | Pepperdine | Sunken Diamond • Stanford, California | 9–7 | 37–22–2 | 14–10 |

NCAA Fullerton Super Regional (2–0)

| # | Date | Opponent | Site/stadium | Score | Overall record | Pac-10 record |
|---|---|---|---|---|---|---|
| 62 | June 6 | at Cal State Fullerton | Goodwin Field • Fullerton, California | 4–3 | 38–22–2 | 14–10 |
| 63 | June 7 | at Cal State Fullerton | Goodwin Field • Fullerton, California | 8–5 | 39–22–2 | 14–10 |

College World Series (2–2)

| # | Date | Opponent | Site/stadium | Score | Overall record | Pac-10 record |
|---|---|---|---|---|---|---|
| 64 | June 14 | vs Florida State | Johnny Rosenblatt Stadium • Omaha, Nebraska | 16–5 | 40–22–2 | 14–10 |
| 65 | June 16 | vs Georgia | Johnny Rosenblatt Stadium • Omaha, Nebraska | 3–4 | 40–23–2 | 14–10 |
| 66 | June 18 | vs Miami (FL) | Johnny Rosenblatt Stadium • Omaha, Nebraska | 8–3 | 41–23–2 | 14–10 |
| 67 | June 21 | vs Georgia | Johnny Rosenblatt Stadium • Omaha, Nebraska | 8–10 | 41–24–2 | 14–10 |

== Awards and honors ==
Jason Castro

- All-Pac-10 Conference
- Third Team All-American National Collegiate Baseball Writers Association
- College World Series All-Tournament Team

Erik Davis

- All-Pac-10 Conference

Brent Milleville

- Honorable Mention All-Pac-10 Conference

Randy Molina

- All-Pac-10 Conference

Cord Phelps

- All-Pac-10 Conference

Sean Ratliff

- All-Pac-10 Conference

Drew Storen

- All-Pac-10 Conference
- First Team Freshman All-American Collegiate Baseball

Austin Yount

- Honorable Mention All-Pac-10 Conference
