= David Perno =

American baseball coach (born 1967)

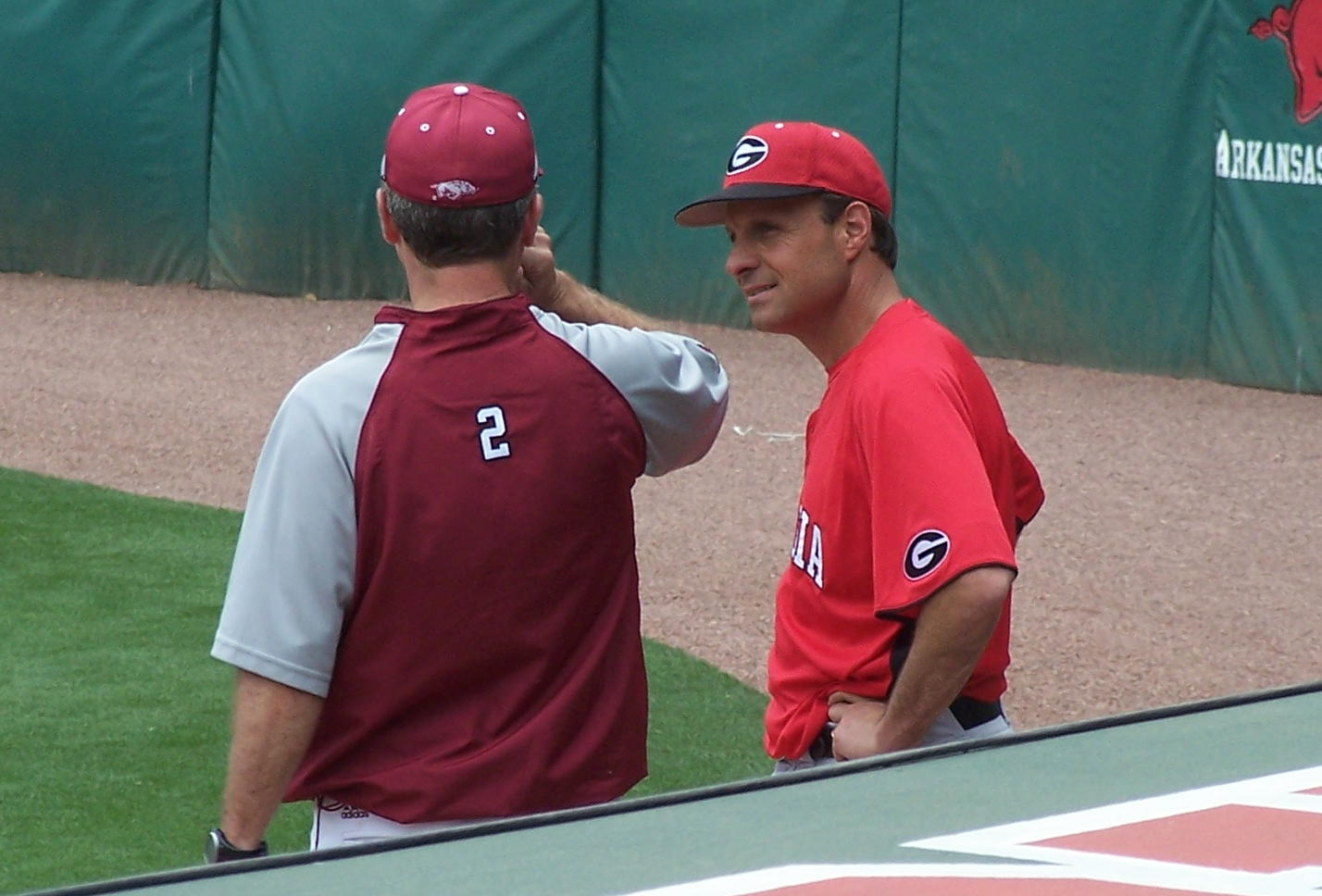
- Perno with Dave Van Horn in Baum Stadium

Current position
- Title: Head coach
- Team: Clarke Central HS (GA)

Biographical details
- Born: July 5, 1967 (age 59); Youngstown, Ohio, U.S.

Playing career

Baseball
- 1987: Middle Georgia College
- 1988–1991: Georgia

Coaching career (HC unless noted)

Baseball
- 1993–1995: Marshall (assistant)
- 1996: Middle Georgia (assistant)
- 1997–2001: Georgia (assistant)
- 2002–2013: Georgia

Football
- 2015–present: Clarke Central HS (GA)

Head coaching record
- Overall: 390–333–1 (college baseball)

Accomplishments and honors

Championships
- 2 SEC (2004, 2008)

Awards
- Baseball America Coach of the Year (2004); 2× SEC Coach of the Year (2004, 2008)

David Perno (born July 5, 1967) is an American college baseball coach who most recently served as the head baseball coach at the University of Georgia. In 12 seasons he compiled a record of 384–329–1. He led the program to five NCAA tournaments, including three College World Series. He was named the 2004 Coach of the Year by Baseball America. That same year, he won his first SEC championship. His 2006 team went 47–23, but the next year, however, they went 23–33. In 2008, his team did much better, going 45–25–1 (20–9–1 SEC) and won his second SEC championship. That one tie was at LSU due to an SEC travel curfew. He was named the SEC coach of the year and was the national runner-up to the Fresno State Bulldogs at the College World Series. He is a former player and assistant coach at Georgia. Two players suffered paralyzing injuries — Chance Veazey in a scooter accident and Jonathan Taylor in a game — in a span of less than two years from 2009 to 2011. He was dismissed by UGA Athletic Director Greg McGarity after the 2013 season.

In December 2015, Perno was named head football coach at his alma mater, Clarke Central High School in Athens, Georgia, where he won a state title as a player in 1985 and played for another in 1984.

== Head coaching record ==
=== College baseball ===
Record table
Season	Team	Overall	Conference	Standing	Postseason
Georgia Bulldogs (Southeastern Conference) (2002–2013)
2002	Georgia	32–29	15–15	3rd (East)	NCAA Regional
2003	Georgia	29–26	10–20	5th (East)	
2004	Georgia	45–23	19–11	1st (East)	College World Series
2005	Georgia	30–25	12–17	5th (East)	
2006	Georgia	47–23	18–12	2nd (East)	College World Series
2007	Georgia	23–33	11–19	6th (East)	
2008	Georgia	45–25–1	20–9–1	1st (East)	College World Series Runner-up
2009	Georgia	38–22	15–15	3rd (East)	NCAA Regional
2010	Georgia	16–37	5–23	6th (East)	
2011	Georgia	33–32	16–14	4th (East)	NCAA Regional
2012	Georgia	31–26	14–15	5th (East)	
2013	Georgia	21–32	7–20	7th (East)	
Georgia:		390–333–1	162–190–1		
Total:		390–333–1			
National champion Postseason invitational champion Conference regular season champion Conference regular season and conference tournament champion Division regular season champion Division regular season and conference tournament champion Conference tournament champion
