= 2008 NCAA Division I baseball tournament =

American college baseball tournament

- Season: 2008
- Teams: 64
- Finals site: Johnny Rosenblatt Stadium; Omaha, NE
- Champions: Fresno State (1st title)
- Runner-up: Georgia (6th CWS Appearance)
- Winning coach: Mike Batesole (1st title)
- MOP: Tommy Mendonca (Fresno State)

The 2008 NCAA Division I baseball tournament was held from May 30 through June 25, 2008 and was part of the 2008 NCAA Division I baseball season. The 64 NCAA Division I college baseball teams were selected out of an eligible 286 teams on May 26, 2008. Thirty teams were awarded an automatic bid as champions of their conference, and 34 teams were selected at-large by the NCAA Division I Baseball Committee. Thirty-eight of the 64 selected teams participated in the 2007 tournament.

The 2008 tournament culminated with 8 teams advancing to the College World Series at historic Rosenblatt Stadium in Omaha, Nebraska, on June 14.

The Fresno State Bulldogs beat the Georgia Bulldogs in the best-of-three championship series to win the NCAA Men's Division I Baseball Championship. Fresno State became the lowest seeded team (4th in the Regionals) to win the National Championship in NCAA history, and the fifth consecutive baseball team to win the title that was not one of the eight national seeds. They were considered a "Cinderella" team throughout the tournament. This was only the third national championship of any kind in school history, following the 1968 NCAA Men's Tennis Tournament and the 1998 NCAA Division I softball national champions.

Fresno State sophomore third baseman Tommy Mendonca won the Most Outstanding Player Award. Tommy hit four home runs and had 11 RBIs and also made a number of spectacular plays in the field.

The first day of the 2008 CWS was moved to Saturday (June 14) from the traditional Friday. Also, if all games were needed in the first double-elimination round, it would take eight days to complete rather than seven. The NCAA cited the need to be more flexible in the super-regional round in case of inclement weather. It also allowed for greater potential ticket revenue, in part because the extra "if-necessary" day would now be ticketed separately if both games are played.

== Bids ==
=== Automatic bids ===
Conference champions from 30 Division I conferences earned automatic bids to regionals. The remaining 34 spots were awarded to schools as at-large invitees.

School	Conference	Record (Conf)	Berth	Last NCAA appearance
Arizona State	Pacific-10	45–11 (16–8)	Won Pac-10	2007 (College World Series)
Bethune-Cookman	MEAC	36–20 (17–1)	Won MEAC tourney	2007 (Tallahassee Regional)
Bucknell	Patriot League	29–22 (10–10)	Won Patriot playoff	2003 (Austin Regional)
Charlotte	Atlantic 10	43–14 (19–8)	Won A-10 tournament	2007 (Columbia, S.C. Regional)
Coastal Carolina	Big South	47–12 (17–3)	Won Big South tourney	2007 (Myrtle Beach Regional)
Columbia	Ivy League	22–28 (15–5)	Won Ivy playoff	1976 (Northeast Regional)
Eastern Illinois	Ohio Valley	27–28 (13–13)	Won OVC tournament	1999 (Waco Regional)
Eastern Michigan	Mid-American	25–32 (15–8)	Won MAC tournament	2003 (Lincoln Regional)
Elon	SoCon	43–16 (19–8)	Won SoCon tourney	2006 (Clemson Regional)
Fresno State	WAC	37–27 (14–10)	Won WAC tourney	2007 (San Diego Regional)
Houston	C-USA	39–22 (19–11)	Won C-USA tourney	2006 (Norman Regional)
UIC	Horizon	34–20 (17–6)	Won Horizon tourney	2007 (Long Beach Regional)
James Madison	Colonial Athletic	38–17 (20–9)	Won CAA tourney	2002 (Columbia Regional)
Lipscomb	A-Sun	32–28 (19–14)	Won A-Sun tourney	First appearance
Long Beach State	Big West	37–19 (16–8)	Won Big West	2007 (Long Beach Reg.)
Louisville	Big East	41–19 (16–11)	Won Big East tourney	2007 (College World Series)
LSU	SEC	43–16 (18–11)	Won SEC Tournament	2005 (Baton Rouge Reg.)
Miami (FL)	ACC	47–8 (23–5)	Won ACC tourney	2007 (Columbia, Mo., Regional)
Michigan	Big Ten	45–12 (26–5)	Won Big Ten tourney	2007 (Corvallis Super Regional)
Mount St. Mary's	NEC	21–32 (13–11)	Won NEC tourney	First appearance
Oral Roberts	Summit	46–12 (24–4)	Won Summit tourney	2007 (Wichita Regional)
Rider	Metro Atlantic	29–25 (13–10)	Won MAAC tourney	1994 (Atlantic I Regional)
Sam Houston State	Southland	37–23 (18–12)	Won Southland tourney	2007 (Oxford Regional)
San Diego	WCC	41–15 (16–5)	Won WCC playoff	2007 (San Diego Regional)
Stony Brook	America East	34–24 (14–10)	Won AmEast tourney	2004 (Kinston Regional)
Texas	Big 12	37–20 (15–12)	Won Big 12 tourney	2007 (Round Rock Regional)
TCU	MWC	43–17 (19–5)	Won MWC tourney	2007 (Houston Regional)
Texas Southern	SWAC	16–32 (7–17)	Won SWAC tourney	2004 (Houston Regional)
Western Kentucky	Sun Belt	33–25 (16–14)	Won SBC tourney	2004 (Oxford Regional)
Wichita State	Missouri Valley	44–15 (19–5)	Won MVC tourney	2007 (Wichita Super Regional)

=== Bids by conference ===
Conference	Total	Schools
Southeastern	9	Alabama, Arkansas, Florida, Georgia, Kentucky, LSU, Ole Miss, South Carolina, Vanderbilt
Atlantic Coast	6	Florida State, Georgia Tech, Miami (FL), North Carolina, NC State, Virginia
Big 12	6	Missouri, Nebraska, Oklahoma, Oklahoma State, Texas, Texas A&M
Pacific-10	5	Arizona, Arizona State, California, Stanford, UCLA
Conference USA	5	East Carolina, Houston, Rice, Southern Miss, Tulane
Big West	4	UC Davis, UC Irvine, Cal State Fullerton, Long Beach State
Big East	2	Louisville, St. John's
Colonial	2	UNC Wilmington, James Madison
Sun Belt	2	New Orleans, Western Kentucky
WCC	2	Pepperdine, San Diego
Atlantic Sun	1	Lipscomb
Atlantic 10	1	Charlotte
America East	1	Stony Brook
Big South	1	Coastal Carolina
Big Ten	1	Michigan
Horizon	1	UIC
Independent	1	Dallas Baptist
Ivy	1	Columbia
Metro Atlantic	1	Rider
Mid-American	1	Eastern Michigan
Mid-Eastern	1	Bethune-Cookman
Missouri Valley	1	Wichita State
Mountain West	1	TCU
Northeast	1	Mount St. Mary's
Ohio Valley	1	Eastern Illinois
Patriot	1	Bucknell
Southern	1	Elon
Southland	1	Sam Houston State
Southwestern	1	Texas Southern
Summit	1	Oral Roberts
Western Athletic	1	Fresno State

== National seeds ==
Bold indicates CWS participant.

1. **Miami (FL)** (47–8)
2. **North Carolina** (46–12)
3. Arizona State (45–11)
4. **Florida State** (48–10)
5. Cal State Fullerton (37–19)
6. **Rice** (42–13)
7. **LSU** (43-16-1)
8. **Georgia** (35-21-1)

== Regionals and super regionals ==
=== Regional schedule ===
Regional rounds were held Friday, May 30 through Monday, June 2. Each regional followed a similar format, with 2 games played on Friday, Saturday, and Sunday, and one on Monday if needed.

Day	Game	Teams
Fri. 5/30/08	1	2/3 or 1/4 (host choice)
Fri. 5/30/08	2	2/3 or 1/4 (host choice)
Sat. 5/31/08	3	Loser Games 1 & 2
Sat. 5/31/08	4	Winner Games 1 & 2
Sun. 6/1/08	5	Winner Game 3 vs Loser Game 4
Sun. 6/1/08	6	Winner Games 4 & 5
Mon. 6/2/08	7	if needed, only if winner of game 5 wins game 6

Best-of-three super regionals were held Friday, June 6 through Monday, June 9. Four series were played Friday-Sunday and four series were played Saturday-Monday.

=== Brackets ===
Bold indicates winner. * indicates extra innings.

==== Coral Gables Super Regional ====
Hosted by Miami (FL) at Mark Light Field

First round	Second round
1	**Miami (FL)**	**7**
4	Bethune-Cookman	4
1	**Miami (FL)**	**6**
2	Missouri	5
3	Ole Miss	0
2	**Missouri**	**7**
Coral Gables Regional – Mark Light Field
4	Bethune-Cookman	1
3	**Ole Miss**	**14**
3	**Ole Miss**	**9**
2	Missouri	6
1	**Arizona**	**13**
4	Eastern Michigan	7
1	**Arizona**	**4**
2	Michigan	3
3	Kentucky	5
2	**Michigan**	**7**
Ann Arbor Regional – Ray Fisher Stadium
4	Eastern Michigan	2
3	**Kentucky**	**3**
3	**Kentucky**	**12**
2	Michigan	6

Regional finals
1	**Miami (FL)**	**11**	--
3	Ole Miss	2	--
1	**Arizona**	**5**	—
3	Kentucky	3	—

Super regionals
1	**Miami (FL)**	3	**14**	**4**
Arizona	**6**^{11}	10	2

==== Athens Super Regional ====
Hosted by Georgia at Foley Field

First round	Second round
1	**NC State**	**6**
4	James Madison	2
1	**NC State**	**5**
2	South Carolina	4
3	Charlotte	8
2	**South Carolina**	**15**
Raleigh Regional – Doak Field
4	**James Madison**	**13**
3	Charlotte	12
4	James Madison	5
2	**South Carolina**	**7**
1	Georgia	7
4	**Lipscomb**	**10**
4	Lipscomb	3
2	**Georgia Tech**	**6**
3	Louisville	5
2	**Georgia Tech**	**8**
Athens Regional – Foley Field
1	**Georgia**	**9**
3	Louisville	8
1	**Georgia**	**14**
4	Lipscomb	3

Regional finals
1	**NC State**	**2**	—
2	South Carolina	1	—
2	Georgia Tech	0	6
1	**Georgia**	**8**	**18**

Super regionals
NC State	4	**10**	8
8	**Georgia**	**11**	6	**17**

==== Fullerton Super Regional ====
Hosted by Cal State Fullerton at Goodwin Field

First round	Second round
1	**Cal State Fullerton**	**11**
4	Rider	0
1	Cal State Fullerton	4
2	**UCLA**	**11**
3	Virginia	2
2	**UCLA**	**3**
Fullerton Regional – Goodwin Field
4	Rider	2
3	**Virginia**	**8**
3	Virginia	1
1	**Cal State Fullerton**	**4**
1	Stanford	2
4	**UC Davis**	**4**
4	UC Davis	4
2	**Pepperdine**	**7**
3	Arkansas	3
2	**Pepperdine**	**4**
Palo Alto Regional – Sunken Diamond
1	**Stanford**	**5**
3	Arkansas	1
1	**Stanford**	**8**
4	UC Davis	4

Regional finals
2	UCLA	8	4
1	**Cal State Fullerton**	**11**	**5**
2	Pepperdine	1	7
1	**Stanford**	**13**	**9**

Super regionals
5	Cal State Fullerton	3	5	—
**Stanford**	**4**	**8**	—

==== Tallahassee Super Regional ====
Hosted by Florida State at Dick Howser Stadium

First round	Second round
1	**Oklahoma State**	5
4	Western Kentucky	3
1	Oklahoma State	3
2	**Wichita State**	**5**
3	TCU	5
2	**Wichita State**	**8**
Stillwater Regional – Allie P. Reynolds Stadium
4	Western Kentucky	5
3	**TCU**	**10**
3	TCU	8
1	**Oklahoma State**	**9**
1	Florida State	0
4	**Bucknell**	**7**
4	Bucknell	1
3	**Tulane**	**4**
3	**Tulane**	**7**
2	Florida	4
Tallahassee Regional – Dick Howser Stadium
1	**Florida State**	**17**
2	Florida	11
1	**Florida State**	**24**
4	Bucknell	9

Regional finals
2	**Wichita State**	**11**^{10}	—
1	Oklahoma State	7	—
3	Tulane	8	7
1	**Florida State**	**17**	**16**

Super regionals
Wichita State	**10**	4	4
4	**Florida State**	7	**14**	**11**

==== Cary Super Regional ====
Hosted by North Carolina at USA Baseball National Training Complex

First round	Second round
1	**North Carolina**	**16**
4	Mount St. Mary's	8
1	**North Carolina**	**5**
2	UNC Wilmington	1
3	Elon	2
2	**UNC Wilmington**	**5**
Cary Regional – USA Baseball National Training Complex
4	Mount St. Mary's	3
3	**Elon**	**6**
3	Elon	11
2	**UNC Wilmington**	**15**
1	**Coastal Carolina**	**10**
4	Columbia	2
1	**Coastal Carolina**	**13**
3	Alabama	10
3	**Alabama**	**16**
2	East Carolina	3
Conway Regional – Charles Watson Stadium
4	Columbia	0
2	**East Carolina**	**9**
2	**East Carolina**	**16**
3	Alabama	1

Regional finals
1	**North Carolina**	**7**	—
2	UNC Wilmington	3	—
1	**Coastal Carolina**	**24**	—
2	East Carolina	11	—

Super regionals
2	**North Carolina**	**9**	**14**	—
Coastal Carolina	4	4	—

==== Baton Rouge Super Regional ====
Hosted by LSU at Alex Box Stadium

First round	Second round
1	**Nebraska**	**13**
4	Eastern Illinois	10
1	Nebraska	2
2	**UC Irvine**	**3**
3	Oral Roberts	7
2	**UC Irvine**	**9**
Lincoln Regional – Hawks Field
4	Eastern Illinois	7
3	**Oral Roberts**	**8**^{10}
3	**Oral Roberts**	**8**
1	Nebraska	0
1	**LSU**	**12**
4	Texas Southern	1
1	**LSU**	**13**
2	Southern Miss	4
3	New Orleans	6
2	**Southern Miss**	**13**
Baton Rouge Regional – Alex Box Stadium
4	Texas Southern	5
3	**New Orleans**	**18**
3	New Orleans	2
2	**Southern Miss**	**8**

Regional finals
2	**UC Irvine**	**8**	—
3	Oral Roberts	0	—
1	**LSU**	**11**	—
2	Southern Miss	4	—

Super regionals
UC Irvine	**11**	7	7
7	**LSU**	5	**9**	**21**

==== Houston Super Regional ====
Hosted by Rice at Reckling Park

First round	Second round
1	**Rice**	**3**
4	Sam Houston State	2
1	**Rice**	**11**
3	St. John's	2
3	**St. John's**	**2**
2	Texas	1
Houston Regional – Reckling Park
4	Sam Houston State	3
2	**Texas**	**13**
2	**Texas**	**4**
3	St. John's	3
1	**Texas A&M**	**15**
4	UIC	1
1	**Texas A&M**	**22**
3	Houston	4
3	**Houston**	**9**
2	Dallas Baptist	5
College Station Regional – Olsen Field
4	**UIC**	**9**
2	Dallas Baptist	5
4	UIC	11
3	**Houston**	**14**^{11}

Regional finals
1	**Rice**	**7**	—
2	Texas	4	—
1	**Texas A&M**	3	**13**
3	Houston	**4**	5

Super regionals
6	**Rice**	**9**	**6**	—
Texas A&M	7	5	—

==== Tempe Super Regional ====
Hosted by Arizona State at Packard Stadium

First round	Second round
1	Long Beach State	3
4	**Fresno State**	**7**
4	**Fresno State**	**6**
2	San Diego	0
3	California	0
2	**San Diego**	**5**
Long Beach Regional – Blair Field
1	**Long Beach State**	**9**
3	California	2
1	Long Beach State	1
2	**San Diego**	**5**
1	**Arizona State**	**9**
4	Stony Brook	7
1	**Arizona State**	**15**
3	Oklahoma	3
3	**Oklahoma**	**8**
2	Vanderbilt	5
Tempe Regional – Packard Stadium
4	Stony Brook	4
2	**Vanderbilt**	**9**
2	Vanderbilt	10
3	**Oklahoma**	**11**

Regional finals
4	**Fresno State**	1	**5**
2	San Diego	**15**	1
1	**Arizona State**	**12**	—
3	Oklahoma	0	—

Super regionals
**Fresno State**	4	**8**	**12**
3	Arizona State	**12**	6	9

== College World Series ==
=== Participants ===
School	Conference	Record (conference)	Head coach	CWS appearances	Best CWS finish	CWS record Not including this year
Florida State	ACC	54–12 (24–6)	Mike Martin	18 (last: 2000)	2nd (1970, 1986, 1999)	25–36
Fresno State	WAC	42–29 (21–11)	Mike Batesole	3 (last: 1991)	3rd (1959)	4–6
Georgia	SEC	41–23–1 (20–9–1)	David Perno	5 (last: 2006)	1st (1990)	6–9
LSU	SEC	48–17–1 (18–11–1)	Paul Mainieri	13 (last: 2004)	1st (1991, 1993, 1996, 1997, 2000)	29–17
Miami (FL)	ACC	52–9 (23–5)	Jim Morris	22 (last: 2006)	1st (1982, 1985, 1999, 2001)	46–36
North Carolina	ACC	51–12 (22–7)	Mike Fox	6 (last: 2007)	2nd (2006, 2007)	10–13
Rice	C-USA	47–13 (21–3)	Wayne Graham	6 (last: 2008)	1st (2003)	10–11
Stanford	Pac-10	39–22–2 (14–10)	Mark Marquess	15 (last: 2003)	1st (1987, 1988)	38–27

=== Bracket ===
First round
1	Miami (FL)	4
8	**Georgia**	**7**
**Stanford**	**16**
4	Florida State	5
1	**Miami (FL)**	**7**
4	Florida State	5
2	**North Carolina**	**8**
7	LSU	4
**Fresno State**	**17**
6	Rice	5
7	**LSU**	**6**
6	Rice	5

Second round
8	**Georgia**	**4**
Stanford	3
1	Miami (FL)	3
**Stanford**	**8**
2	North Carolina	3
**Fresno State**	**5**
7	LSU	3
2	**North Carolina**	**7**

Semifinals
8	**Georgia**	**10**	—
Stanford	8	—
**Fresno State**	3	**6**
2	North Carolina	**4**	1

Finals
8	Georgia	**7**	10	1
**Fresno State**	6	**19**	**6**

=== Championship series ===
==== Monday, June 23 ====
===== Game 14, 6:00 PM =====
Team	1	2	3	4	5	6	7	8	9	R	H	E
Fresno State (3–2), (0–1)	1	0	0	1	0	1	0	3	0	**6**	**7**	**0**
**#8 Georgia** (4–0), (1–0)	0	0	1	0	2	0	0	4	x	**7**	**10**	**1**
Starting pitchers: Fresno: Sean Bonesteele (2–2); UGA: Trevor Holder (8–4); WP: Will Harvil (1–1) LP: Brandon Burke (4–5) Sv: Joshua Fields (18); Home runs: Fresno: Steve Detwiler (10; 2 runs, 0 outs, top of 5th), Tommy Mendonca (18; Solo, 2 out, top of 8th), Jordan Ribera (5; Solo, 0 out, top of 3rd); UGA: Gordon Beckham (27; 2 runs, 0 out, bottom 8th)

==== Tuesday, June 24 ====
===== Game 15, 6:35 PM =====
Team	1	2	3	4	5	6	7	8	9	R	H	E
#8 Georgia (4–1), (1–1)	3	1	1	1	0	0	4	0	0	**10**	**15**	**0**
**Fresno State** (4–2), (1–1)	0	0	6	5	4	0	3	1	x	**19**	**19**	**3**
Starting pitchers: UGA: Nick Montgomery (4–2); Fresno: Justin Miller (6–4); WP: Holden Sprague (6–2) LP: Stephen Dodson (5–5) Sv: Jake Hower (1); Home runs: UGA: None; Fresno: Tommy Mendonca (19; 3 runs, 2 out, bottom 3rd), Steve Susdorf (13; 2 runs, 1 out, bottom 5th)

==== Wednesday, June 25 ====
===== Game 16, 6:00 PM =====
Team	1	2	3	4	5	6	7	8	9	R	H	E
**Fresno State** (5–2), (2–1)	0	2	0	1	0	3	0	0	0	**6**	**8**	**4**
#8 Georgia (4–2), (1–2)	0	0	0	0	0	0	0	1	0	**1**	**6**	**2**
Starting pitchers: Fresno: Justin Wilson (8–5); UGA: Nathan Moreau (4–3); WP: Justin Wilson (9–5) LP: Nathan Moreau (4–4); Home runs: Fresno: Steve Detwiler (11; 2 runs, 1 out, top 2nd), Steve Detwiler (12; 3 runs, 2 out, top 6th); UGA: Gordon Beckham (28; Solo, 0 out, bottom 8th)

=== All-Tournament Team ===
The following players were members of the College World Series All-Tournament Team.

Position	Player	School
P	Alex White	North Carolina
P	Justin Wilson	Fresno State
C	Jason Castro	Stanford
1B	Dustin Ackley	North Carolina
2B	Erik Wetzel	Fresno State
3B	**Tommy Mendonca (MOP)**	Fresno State
SS	Gordon Beckham	Georgia
OF	Tim Fedroff	North Carolina
OF	Steve Susdorf	Fresno State
OF	Steve Detwiler	Fresno State
DH	Ryan Peisel	Georgia

== Record by conference ==
Conference	# of Bids	Record	Win %	RF	SR	WS	NS	CS	NC
WAC	1	10–4	.714	1	1	1	1	1	1
SEC	9	24–21	.533	5	2	2	1	1	–
ACC	6	27–15	.643	5	4	3	1	–	–
Pac-10	5	18–11	.621	4	3	1	1	–	–
Conference USA	5	14–10	.583	5	1	1	–	–	–
Big West	4	10–9	.526	2	2	–	–	–	–
Big 12	6	11–13	.458	4	1	–	–	–	–
MVC	1	4–2	.667	1	1	–	–	–	–
Big South	1	3–2	.600	1	1	–	–	–	–
WCC	2	5–4	.556	2	–	–	–	–	–
Colonial	2	3–4	.429	1	–	–	–	–	–
Big East	2	1–4	.200	–	–	–	–	–	–
Sun Belt	2	1–4	.200	–	–	–	–	–	–
Other	18	8–36	.182	1	–	–	–	–	–

The columns RF, SR, WS, NS, CS, and NC respectively stand for the regional finals, super regionals, College World Series teams, national semifinals, championship series, and national champion.

== Tournament notes ==
- Oregon State was not invited to the NCAA tournament, marking the first time since 1991 that the defending champion did not return to the following year's tourney (Georgia).
- Clemson was not invited to the NCAA tournament, breaking a streak of consecutive appearances for the Tigers that dated back to the 1987 season.
- Dallas Baptist made its first appearance. DBU was the first independent institution to qualify for the Division I tourney (other than Miami (Fla.), which kept an independent schedule during its years in the Big East) since Cal State Northridge did so in 1992.
- Michigan was the only non-#1-seed selected to host a regional, forcing #1 seed Arizona to play an away regional, as the NCAA organizing committee said it was trying to maintain geographical balance with the host sites.
- The Baton Rouge super regional marked the last games played at the original Alex Box Stadium, LSU's home since 1938. The Tigers opened Alex Box Stadium, Skip Bertman Field in 2009

=== Round 1 ===
- Four No. 1 seeded regional host schools, out of 16 total, lost first-round games to No. 4 seeds:
  - Georgia 7, Lipscomb 10
  - Stanford 2, UC Davis 4
  - Florida St. 0, Bucknell 7
  - Long Beach St. 3, Fresno State 7
- Five No. 3 seeds upset No. 2 seeds in the opening round.

=== Round 2 ===
- Fresno State was the only #4 seed to register wins in the first two rounds of the tournament.
- Tulane was the only #3 seed to register wins in the first two rounds of the tournament.
- 9 of the 16 #1 seeds registered wins in the first two rounds of the tournament.

=== Super regionals ===
- Six of the eight national seeds advanced to the College World Series. Only #3 seed Arizona State and #5 seed Cal State Fullerton were unable to make it past super regionals.
- Fresno State became the first team in the history of the NCAA tournament to make it to the College World Series as a #4 regional seed.

=== CWS records tied or broken ===
- Most runs scored in an inning: 11 (tied)(Stanford, 9th inning, Game 1 against Florida State)
- Most runners left on base in a nine-inning game: 17 (tied) (Florida State, Game 5 against Miami)
- Most doubles hit by a player: 3 (tied) by Rich Poythress Georgia against Stanford, Game 11.
- Most losses by a team who won the College World Series: 31 (Fresno State)
- Lowest seed to win the College World Series: #4 regional seed, #89 RPI (Fresno State)

== Television/radio/online coverage ==
=== Regionals ===
- During the regionals, ESPNU showed games from Coral Gables (Karl Ravech and Barry Larkin) and Fullerton (Kyle Peterson), with Mike Gleason and Will Kimmey in the Charlotte ESPNU studios.
- CBS College Sports Network was not originally scheduled to show any games, as in years past. However, it aired Nebraska's Friday and Saturday games through a simulcast with Nebraska Educational Telecommunications.
- The Baton Rouge regional was shown regionally on Cox Sports Television, the Athens regional on Comcast Sports Southeast/Charter Sports Southeast, and the final two days of the Tallahassee regional aired on Sun Sports.

=== Super regionals ===
- All super-regional games were shown on ESPN, ESPN2 or ESPNU on television and ESPN360 through online streaming video. Announcers included Karl Ravech, Pam Ward, Dave Ryan, Brian Jordan, Robin Ventura, and Kyle Peterson.

Mike Gleason and Will Kimmey made up the studio team (in Bristol, Connecticut) for both regional and super-regional rounds.

=== College World Series ===
- All College World Series games were shown on ESPN, ESPN2, ESPNU, or ESPN Classic on television and ESPN360 through online streaming video.
- Westwood One broadcast all CWS championship series games on radio. Participating institutions were allowed local broadcast rights in the earlier rounds, and games were also available on XM Satellite Radio and Sirius Satellite Radio.

== See also ==
- 2008 NCAA Division II baseball tournament
- 2008 NCAA Division III baseball tournament
- 2008 NAIA World Series
