= Justin Holmes =

American college baseball coach

Biographical details
- Born: November 28, 1981 (age 44); Montgomery, Alabama, U.S.

Playing career
- 2001: South Florida
- 2002–2004: Georgia
- 2004–2005: Burlington Indians
- 2005: Lake County Captains
- 2006–2007: Traverse City Beach Bums
- Position: Shortstop

Coaching career (HC unless noted)
- 2008–2010: Georgia (vol. asst.)
- 2011–2013: Mercer (asst.)
- 2015–2018: Tennessee Tech (asst.)
- 2019: Tennessee Tech

Head coaching record
- Overall: 22–32
- Tournaments: OVC: 0–0; NCAA: 0–0

Justin Holmes (born November 28, 1981) is an American college baseball coach and former shortstop. Holmes was most recently the head coach of the Tennessee Tech Golden Eagles baseball team.

== Amateur career ==
Holmes attended Oviedo High School in Oviedo, Florida. Holmes played for the school's varsity baseball team all four years, he recorded a .376 batting average, 41 hits, 7 doubles and 3 triples as a senior and was a 3rd team all-state selection as a junior. Holmes then enrolled at the University of South Florida, to play college baseball for the South Florida Bulls baseball team.

As a freshman at the University of South Florida in 2001, Holmes had a .333 batting average, a .378 on-base percentage (OBP) and a .394 SLG, with two doubles.

As a sophomore in 2002, Holmes transferred to Georgia. Holmes batted .311 with a .340 SLG, 3 doubles, and 17 RBIs.

In the 2003 season as a junior, Holmes hit 1 home run, 18 doubles, 1 triple and 16 RBIs. After the 2003 season, he played collegiate summer baseball with the Wareham Gatemen of the Cape Cod Baseball League and the Newport Gulls of the NECBL.

Holmes saved his greatest performance for his final year, hitting.332 and slugging.510 with 56 RBIs, 14 doubles, 3 triples, and 8 home runs. He was named Second Team All-Southeastern Conference and the Bulldogs finished 3rd at the 2004 College World Series.

== Professional career ==
Holmes was considered to be an average player in the 2004 Major League Baseball draft and was drafted in the 26th round by the Cleveland Indians.

Holmes began his professional career with the Burlington Indians of the Rookie Appalachian League, where he batted .233 with four doubles. He played in three games with the Lake County Captains of the Class-A Midwest League in 2005. He hit .222 with just two hits in 9 at bats for Lake County. Holmes finished the 2005 season with the Burlington Indians. He completed the season batting .159 with 7 hits and 5 RBIs in 17 games. Holmes was released following the season.

In 2006, Holmes signed with the Traverse City Beach Bums of the Frontier League. Holmes was a two-time all-star for the Beach Bums. At the conclusion of the 2007 season, Holmes retired from professional baseball.

== Coaching career ==
Holmes began his coaching career as a volunteer assistant at his alma mater of Georgia from 2008 to 2010. On July 1, 2010, Holmes accepted a role as an assistant coach for Craig Gibson's coaching staff with the Mercer Bears baseball team. Holmes left the Mercer team following the 2013 season. After spending a season away from baseball, Holmes joined the Tennessee Tech Golden Eagles baseball program as an assistant in August, 2014.

On June 21, 2018, Holmes was promoted to the head coach of the Golden Eagles. After just one season at the helm of the Golden Eagles, Holmes was relieved of his duties for "conduct that is inconsistent with the expectations and standards Tennessee Tech has for all head coaches."

== Head coaching record ==
Record table
Season	Team	Overall	Conference	Standing	Postseason
Tennessee Tech Golden Eagles (Ohio Valley Conference) (2019)
2019	Tennessee Tech	22–32	9–21	11th	
Tennessee Tech:		22–32	9–21		
Total:		22–32			
National champion Postseason invitational champion Conference regular season champion Conference regular season and conference tournament champion Division regular season champion Division regular season and conference tournament champion Conference tournament champion

== See also ==
- List of current NCAA Division I baseball coaches
