= Foley Field =

Baseball park at University of Georgia

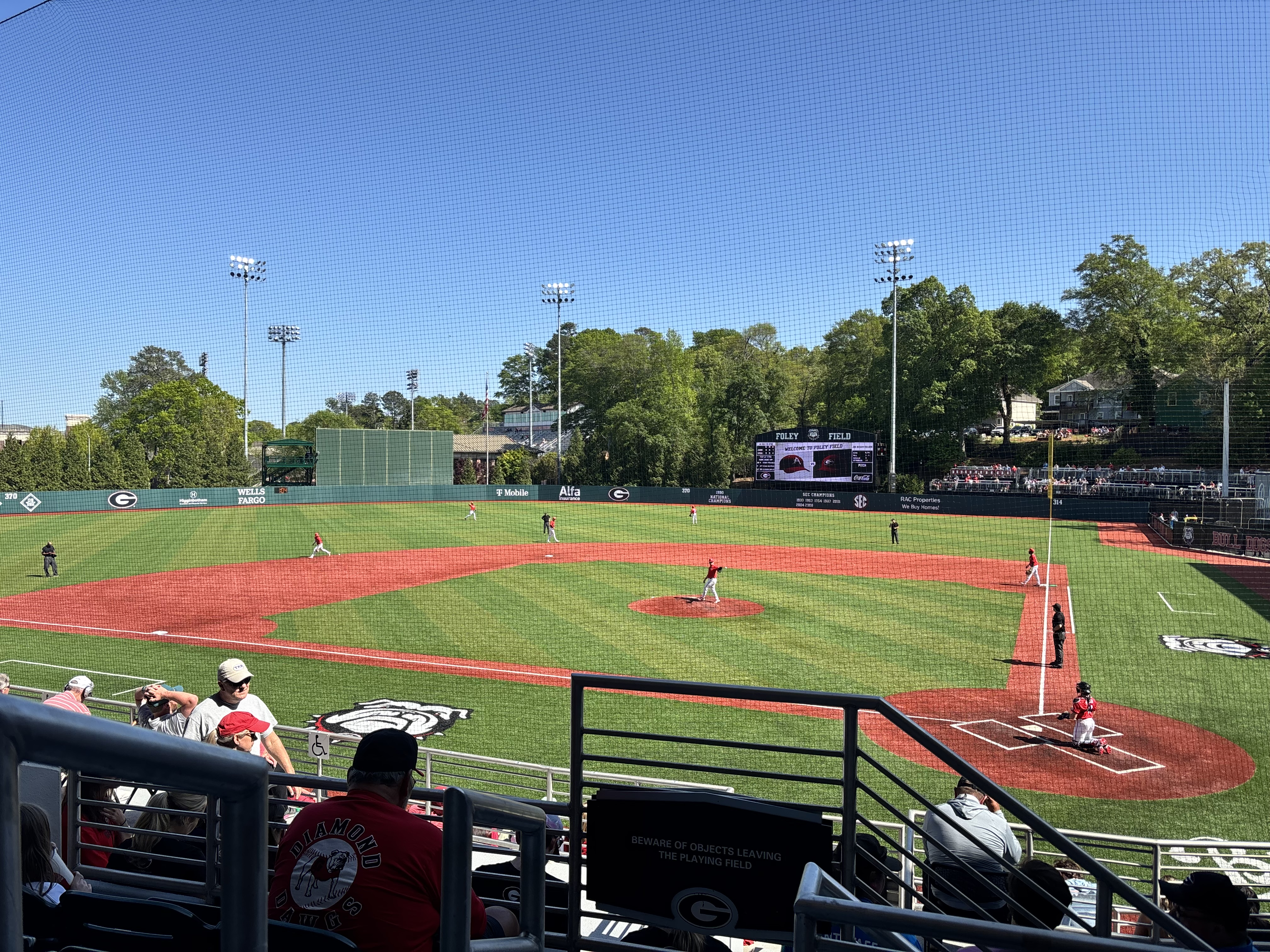
- Foley Field in Athens, Georgia

- Location in Georgia Location in the United States
- Full name: Foley Field
- Address: 1 Rutherford Street
- Location: Athens, Georgia
- Coordinates: 33°56′27″N 83°22′49″W
- Owner: University of Georgia
- Operator: University of Georgia
- Capacity: 3,633
- Type: Stadium
- Event: Baseball
- Surface: AstroTurf
- Scoreboard: Electronic
- Record attendance: 4,461
- Field size: LF: 350 ft (106.7 m); LC: 370 ft (112.8 m); CF: 404 ft (123.1 m); RC: 365 ft (111.3 m); RF: 314 ft (95.7 m)

Construction
- Opened: 1966
- Renovated: 1990, 2015, 2025
- Cost: $3.5 million (1990)

Tenant
- Georgia Bulldogs baseball (1966–present)

Website
- Foley Field

Foley Field is a baseball stadium in Athens, Georgia, United States. It is the home field of the University of Georgia Bulldogs college baseball team. Opened in 1966, the stadium holds 3,633 people.

== History ==
Foley Field was built in 1966. The stadium was renovated in 1990, the same year that the University of Georgia won the College World Series in Omaha, Nebraska. A second round of renovations was completed in 2025, adding new facilities and replacing the grass and dirt field with AstroTurf.

Foley Field hosted the 1987 Southeastern Conference baseball tournament, won by Mississippi State.

Foley Field has hosted nine NCAA regional tournaments in 2001, 2004, 2006, 2008, 2018, 2019, 2024, 2025, and 2026. In five of the nine years, the Bulldogs' baseball team advanced to the College World Series. The stadium also hosted Super Regionals in 2001, 2006, 2008, 2024, and 2026. The Bulldogs own a record of 35–15 in NCAA post season games held at Foley Field.

== Attendance ==
Several attendance records have been set in recent years, including in both Super Regionals hosted by the stadium. First, 7th-ranked Georgia defeated 10th-ranked Florida State 8–7 in front of 4,290 spectators on June 2, 2001. Then, on June 12, 2006, 6th-ranked Georgia defeated 15th-ranked South Carolina in front of 4,302 spectators. The most recent record set was during the regular season on March 21, 2009, as 3rd-ranked Georgia defeated Mississippi State 4–0 in front of 4,461 spectators.

In 2013, the Bulldogs ranked 35th among Division I baseball programs in attendance, averaging 1,940 per home game.

== See also ==
- List of NCAA Division I baseball venues
