= 2008 Florida Atlantic Owls baseball team =

American college baseball season

2008 Florida Atlantic Owls baseball
- Conference: Sun Belt Conference
- Record: 24–16 (11–6 Sun Belt)
- Head coach: Kevin Cooney
- Home stadium: FAU Baseball Stadium

2008 Sun Belt Conference baseball standings
	Conf.						Overall
Team	W		L		PCT		W	L		PCT
Louisiana–Monroe ‍†‍‍	20	–	10	–	0	.667		34	–	24	–	0	.586
New Orleans ‍‍‍^{y}	18	–	11	–	0	.621		43	–	21	–	0	.672
Troy ‍‍‍	18	–	12	–	0	.600		32	–	26	–	0	.552
Florida Atlantic ‍‍‍	15	–	12	–	1	.554		32	–	27	–	1	.542
Western Kentucky ‍‍‡‍^{y}	16	–	14	–	0	.533		33	–	27	–	1	.549
Louisiana–Lafayette ‍‍‍	16	–	14	–	0	.533		30	–	29	–	0	.508
South Alabama ‍‍‍	15	–	15	–	0	.500		33	–	25	–	0	.569
Middle Tennessee ‍‍‍	13	–	16	–	0	.448		27	–	29	–	1	.482
FIU ‍‍‍	12	–	18	–	0	.400		20	–	36	–	0	.357
Arkansas–Little Rock ‍‍‍	10	–	18	–	0	.357		16	–	32	–	0	.333
Arkansas State ‍‍‍	8	–	21	–	1	.283		20	–	34	–	1	.373
† – Conference champion ‡ – Tournament champion y – Invited to the NCAA tournament As of June 30, 2008; Rankings from Collegiate Baseball

The 2008 Florida Atlantic Owls baseball team will be the intercollegiate baseball team of Florida Atlantic University. It competes on the Division I level in the Sun Belt Conference. The 2008 team marked the second season of baseball to compete in the Sun Belt, after Florida Atlantic joined the conference after the 2006 season. On Thursday, April 24, 2008 Coach Kevin Cooney announced that the 2008 season would be his last season as head coach of the Owls. With his retirement announcement, Cooney will leave the Owls after 21 years as head coach. Up to this point, in 28 years of existence, Florida Atlantic baseball had had only two coaches, Steve Traylor and Kevin Cooney.

== 2008 schedule and results ==
Date	Opponent	Location	Result	Record	SBC	Notes
February 22, 2008	vs. #5 North Carolina	Boca Raton, Florida	L 7-1	0-1		
February 23, 2008	vs. #5 North Carolina	Boca Raton, Florida	L 14-13	0-2		
February 24, 2008	vs. #5 North Carolina	Boca Raton, Florida	L 8-7	0-3		
February 26, 2008	at Bethune Cookman	Daytona Beach, Florida				Ppd. due to rain
February 27, 2008	vs. Mount St. Mary	Boca Raton, Florida	W 13-5	1-3		
February 28, 2008	vs. Eastern Michigan	Boca Raton, Florida	W 11-6	2-3		
February 29, 2008	vs. Eastern Michigan	Boca Raton, Florida	W 5-2	3-3		
March 1, 2008	vs. Eastern Michigan	Boca Raton, Florida	W 12-11	4-3		
March 2, 2008	vs. Eastern Michigan	Boca Raton, Florida	W 24-3	5-3		
March 4, 2008	vs. Boston College	Boca Raton, Florida	W 4-3	6-3		
March 5, 2008	vs. Boston College	Boca Raton, Florida	L 10-6	6-4		
March 7, 2008	at UALR	Little Rock, Arkansas				Ppd. due to snow
March 8, 2008	at UALR	Little Rock, Arkansas				Ppd. due to snow
March 9, 2008	at UALR	Little Rock, Arkansas	W 4-3	7-4	1-0	
March 11, 2008	at South Florida	Tampa, Florida	L 7-6	7-5		
March 12, 2008	vs. Monmouth	Boca Raton, Florida	W 12-11	8-5		
March 14, 2008	vs. Louisiana-Lafayette	Boca Raton, Florida	W 13-6	9-5	2-0	
March 15, 2008	vs. Louisiana-Lafayette	Boca Raton, Florida	L 9-3	9-6	2-1	
March 16, 2008	vs. Louisiana-Lafayette	Boca Raton, Florida	W 9-2	10-6	3-1	
March 17, 2008	vs. Cornell	Boca Raton, Florida	W 11-6	11-6		
March 18, 2008	vs. Rutgers	Boca Raton, Florida	W 10-1	12-6		
March 20, 2008	vs. NJIT	Boca Raton, Florida	W 21-11	13-6		
March 21, 2008	vs. Middle Tennessee	Boca Raton, Florida	W 13-7	14-6	4-1	
March 23, 2008	vs. Middle Tennessee	Boca Raton, Florida	W 13-6	15-6	5-1	
March 23, 2008	vs. Middle Tennessee	Boca Raton, Florida	W 10-7	16-6	6-1	
March 28, 2008	at Louisiana-Monroe	Monroe, Louisiana	L 7-6	16-7	6-2	
March 29, 2008	at Louisiana-Monroe	Monroe, Louisiana	L 3-2	16-8	6-3	
March 30, 2008	at Louisiana-Monroe	Monroe, Louisiana	L 13-5	16-9	6-4	
April 1, 2008	at #2 Miami	Miami, Florida	L 16-7	16-10		
April 4, 2008	at South Alabama	Mobile, Alabama	L 14-3	16-11	6-5	
April 5, 2008	at South Alabama	Mobile, Alabama	W 13-9	17-11	7-5	
April 6, 2008	at South Alabama	Mobile, Alabama	W 9-4	18-11	8-5	
April 9, 2008	at #1 Miami	Miami, Florida	W 6-3	19-11		First-ever victory over a #1
April 11, 2008	vs. Troy	Boca Raton, Florida	W 6-5	20-11	9-5	
April 12, 2008	vs. Troy	Boca Raton, Florida	L 7-2	20-12	9-6	
April 13, 2008	vs. Troy	Boca Raton, Florida	W 17-6	21-12	10-6	7 innings
April 16, 2008	vs. #1 Miami	Boca Raton, Florida	L 12-10	21-13		
April 18, 2008	at NYIT	Old Westbury, New York	L 10-7	21-14		
April 19, 2008	at NYIT	Old Westbury, New York	W 22-7	22-14		7 innings
April 19, 2008	at NYIT	Old Westbury, New York	W 16-2	23-14		
April 20, 2008	at NYIT	Old Westbury, New York	L 2-0	23-15		
April 22, 2008	vs. South Florida	Boca Raton, Florida	L 19-11	23-16		11 innings
April 25, 2008	vs. Western Kentucky	Boca Raton, Florida	W 12-6	24-16	11-6	
April 26, 2008	vs. Western Kentucky	Boca Raton, Florida				
April 27, 2008	vs. Western Kentucky	Boca Raton, Florida				
May 2, 2008	at New Orleans	New Orleans, Louisiana				
May 3, 2008	at New Orleans	New Orleans, Louisiana				
May 4, 2008	at New Orleans	New Orleans, Louisiana				
May 6, 2008	vs. Bethune Cookman	Boca Raton, Florida				
May 7, 2008	vs. Florida Gulf Coast	Boca Raton, Florida				
May 9, 2008	vs. Arkansas State	Boca Raton, Florida				
May 10, 2008	vs. Arkansas State	Boca Raton, Florida				
May 11, 2008	vs. Arkansas State	Boca Raton, Florida				
May 13, 2008	at Florida Gulf Coast	Fort Myers, Florida				
May 15, 2008	at Florida International	Miami, Florida				
May 16, 2008	at Florida International	Miami, Florida				
May 17, 2008	at Florida International	Miami, Florida				
May 21, 2008	vs. Western Kentucky	Lafayette, Louisiana	L 9-0	29-26-1	0-1	G3 of SBC Tournament
May 22, 2008	vs. Middle Tennessee	Lafayette, Louisiana	W 12-7	30-26-1	1-1	G6 (Loser's Bracket)
May 23, 2008	vs. Louisiana-Monroe	Lafayette, Louisiana	W 4-2	31-26-1	2-1	G10 (Loser's Bracket)
May 24, 2008	vs. Western Kentucky	Lafayette, Louisiana	W 6-5	32-26-1	3-1	G12 (Semifinals)
May 24, 2008	vs. Western Kentucky	Lafayette, Louisiana	L 5-4	32-27-1	3-2	G14 (FAU Eliminated)
* Sun Belt Conference games in GREEN.
