= 2008 Nebraska Cornhuskers baseball team =

American college baseball season

2008 Nebraska Cornhuskers baseball
- Conference: Big 12 Conference

Ranking
- Coaches: No. 7
- Record: 41–16–1 (17–9–1 Big 12)
- Head coach: Mike Anderson (6th season)
- Assistant coach: Dave Bingham (3rd season)
- Hitting coach: Nate Thompson (2nd season)
- Pitching coach: Eric Newman (1st season)
- Home stadium: Hawks Field

2008 Big 12 Conference baseball standings
	Conf.						Overall
Team	W		L		T	PCT	W		L		T	PCT
No. 10 Texas A&M ‍†‍‍^{y}	19	–	8	–	0	.704	46	–	19	–	0	.708
No. 18 Oklahoma State ‍‍‍^{y}	18	–	9	–	0	.667	44	–	18	–	0	.710
No. 22 Nebraska ‍‍‍^{y}	17	–	9	–	1	.648	41	–	16	–	1	.716
No. 21 Missouri ‍‍‍^{y}	16	–	11	–	0	.593	39	–	21	–	0	.650
No. 25 Texas ‍‍‡‍^{y}	15	–	12	–	0	.556	37	–	24	–	0	.607
Baylor ‍‍‍	11	–	16	–	0	.407	32	–	26	–	0	.552
Kansas State ‍‍‍	11	–	16	–	0	.407	29	–	29	–	0	.500
Oklahoma ‍‍‍^{y}	9	–	17	–	1	.352	36	–	26	–	1	.579
Kansas ‍‍‍	9	–	18	–	0	.333	30	–	27	–	0	.526
Texas Tech ‍‍‍	9	–	18	–	0	.333	25	–	30	–	0	.455
† – Conference champion ‡ – Tournament champion y – Invited to the NCAA tournament As of June 30, 2008; Rankings from Collegiate Baseball

The 2008 Nebraska Cornhuskers baseball team was Mike Anderson's sixth year as head coach. The Cornhuskers played their home games at Hawks Field.

== Preseason ==
Potential, Promise, Proven is the Huskers motto for the year. While 8 pitchers from 2007 left for the draft, the 2008 Cornhuskers team is the youngest for Mike Anderson with 15 newcomers plus 5 of last years redshirts. Nebraska plays 8 teams that made the 2007 NCAA tournament including 5 one seeds. The baseball team was picked to finish sixth in the Big 12 by a vote of the league coaches with 36 points and no first place votes.

== Roster ==
2008 Nebraska Cornhuskers baseball team
Players
Coaches

#	Pos.	Name	B/T	Height	Weight	Year	Home town
2	INF	Jake Mort	R/R	5 ft 11 in (1.8 m)	170 lb (77 kg)	Jr	Nebraska City, Nebraska
3	INF	Jake Opitz	L/R	6 ft 0 in (1.83 m)	188 lb (85 kg)	Sr	Littleton, Colorado
4	OF	D. J. Belfonte	L/L	5 ft 10 in (1.78 m)	180 lb (82 kg)	So	Kansas City, Missouri
6	INF	Brett Sowers	R/R	5 ft 10 in (1.78 m)	187 lb (85 kg)	RS Fr	Englewood, Colorado
7	RHP	Tyler Rank	L/R	6 ft 4 in (1.93 m)	230 lb (104 kg)	Fr	Rochester, Minnesota
8	RHP	Sean Yost	R/R	6 ft 7 in (2.01 m)	185 lb (84 kg)	Fr	Lincoln, Nebraska
9	INF	Dan Johnston	R/R	6 ft 1 in (1.85 m)	178 lb (81 kg)	Fr	Papillion, Nebraska
10	C	Drew Gray	R/R	6 ft 5 in (1.96 m)	215 lb (98 kg)	Jr	Archie, Missouri
11	RHP	Matt Freeman	R/R	6 ft 1 in (1.85 m)	185 lb (84 kg)	Fr	Omaha, Nebraska
13	C	Mitch Abeita	R/R	6 ft 0 in (1.83 m)	189 lb (86 kg)	Sr	Dallas, Texas
14	RHP	Thad Weber	R/R	6 ft 2 in (1.88 m)	204 lb (93 kg)	Sr	Friend, Nebraska
15	INF	Craig Corriston	R/R	5 ft 11 in (1.8 m)	205 lb (93 kg)	Sr	Paris, Texas
16	INF	Andy Cotton	R/R	5 ft 8 in (1.73 m)	170 lb (77 kg)	RS Fr	Lincoln, Nebraska
17	RHP	Joe Broekemeier	R/R	6 ft 4 in (1.93 m)	204 lb (93 kg)	RS Fr	Aurora, Nebraska
18	RHP	Casey Hauptman	R/R	6 ft 4 in (1.93 m)	205 lb (93 kg)	Fr	Omaha, Nebraska
19	INF	Jeff Tezak	S/R	5 ft 10 in (1.78 m)	180 lb (82 kg)	Sr	San Diego, California
20	INF	Ben Kline	R/R	6 ft 3 in (1.91 m)	181 lb (82 kg)	Fr	Omaha, Nebraska
21	OF	Nick Sullivan	L/R	5 ft 11 in (1.8 m)	200 lb (91 kg)	Jr	Aurora, Colorado
22	OF	Clay Cuno	R/R	6 ft 3 in (1.91 m)	215 lb (98 kg)	So	New Bloomfield, Missouri
23	RHP	Johnny Dorn	R/R	6 ft 3 in (1.91 m)	210 lb (95 kg)	Sr	Grand Island, Nebraska
24	OF	Bryce Nimmo	L/L	5 ft 10 in (1.78 m)	174 lb (79 kg)	Sr	Cheyenne, Wyoming
25	RHP	Erik Anderson	R/R	5 ft 11 in (1.8 m)	185 lb (84 kg)	So	Prairie Village, Kansas
26	LHP	Dan Jennings	L/L	6 ft 3 in (1.91 m)	183 lb (83 kg)	Jr	West Des Moines, Iowa
28	LHP	Joe Hatasaki	L/L	5 ft 10 in (1.78 m)	174 lb (79 kg)	So	Mountain View, California
30	RHP	Erik Bird	R/R	6 ft 1 in (1.85 m)	220 lb (100 kg)	Jr	Omaha, Nebraska
31	LHP	Ryan Christenson	L/L	6 ft 1 in (1.85 m)	175 lb (79 kg)	Fr	Gilbert, Arizona
32	OF	Tyler Farst	R/R	6 ft 1 in (1.85 m)	215 lb (98 kg)	So	Cedar Park, Texas
33	RHP	Michael Mariot	R/R	6 ft 0 in (1.83 m)	180 lb (82 kg)	Fr	Southlake, Texas
35	C	Cody Neer	S/R	6 ft 3 in (1.91 m)	215 lb (98 kg)	Jr	Orlando, Florida
37	LHP	Zach Herr	L/L	5 ft 9 in (1.75 m)	182 lb (83 kg)	Jr	Omaha, Nebraska
39	RHP	Aaron Pribanic	R/R	6 ft 4 in (1.93 m)	200 lb (91 kg)	Jr	Plano, Texas
41	RHP	Mike Nesseth	R/R	6 ft 5 in (1.96 m)	213 lb (97 kg)	RS Fr	Windom, Minnesota
43	LHP	Eric Rose	L/L	6 ft 1 in (1.85 m)	237 lb (108 kg)	RS Fr	Billings, Montana

Head coach

Mike Anderson

Assistant coach(es)

Dave Bingham

Hitting coach(es)

Nate Thompson

Pitching coach(es)

Eric Newman

Legend

- (C) Team captain
- (S) Suspended
- (I) Ineligible
- Injured
- Current redshirt

Roster

== Schedule ==
2008 Nebraska Cornhuskers baseball game log
Regular season
February (2–2)

Date	Opponent	Site/stadium	Win	Loss	Save	Score	Overall record (Big 12)
Feb. 22	Stanford	Palo Alto, California	Bleich (1-0)	Weber (0-1)		L 7-17	0-1
Feb. 22	Stanford	Palo Alto, California	Dorn (1-0)	Davis (0-1)		W 9-2	1-1
Feb. 23	Stanford	Postponed (rain)					
Feb. 24	Stanford	Palo Alto, California	Inman (1-0)	Bird (0-1)	Stringer (1)	L 2-4	1-2
Feb. 29	UC Riverside	Hawks Field	Anderson (1-0)	Penney (0-1)		W 3-2	2-2

March (19–2–1)

Date	Opponent	Site/stadium	Win	Loss	Save	Score	Overall record (Big 12)
Mar. 1	UC Riverside	Hawks Field	Jennings (1-0)	Larkins (1-1)		W 10-4	3-2
Mar. 1	UC Riverside	Hawks Field	Weber (1-1)	Applebee (0-2)	Nesseth (1)	W 5-2	4-2
Mar. 2	UC Riverside	Hawks Field	Pribanic (1-0)	Orozco (0-1)		W 13-1 (7)	5-2
Mar. 4	Nebraska–Kearney	Hawks Field	Hatasaki (1-0)	Wrobel (1-3)		W 11-2	6-2
Mar. 8	Northern Colorado	Hawks Field	Dorn (2-0)	Reap (1-1)		W 12-2	7-2
Mar. 9	Northern Colorado	Hawks Field	Nesseth (1-0)	Peery (1-2)	Anderson (1)	W 3-2	8-2
Mar. 9	Northern Colorado	Hawks Field	Weber (2-1)	Kazell (0-1)	Herr (1)	W 8-5	9-2
Mar. 10	Northern Colorado	Hawks Field	Pribanic (2-0)	Keating (2-1)		W 7-0	10-2
Mar. 11	South Dakota State	Hawks Field	Mariot (1-0)	Johnson (0-2)		W 7-3	11-2
Mar. 14	Kansas State	Manhattan, Kansas	Herr (1-0)	Hoge (0-1)	Anderson (2)	W 2-1	12-2 (1-0)
Mar. 15	Kansas State	Manhattan, Kansas	Weber (3-1)	Bayuk (0-2)		W 11-4	13-2 (2-0)
Mar. 16	Kansas State	Manhattan, Kansas	Nesseth (2-0)	Edwards (1-2)	Anderson (3)	W 5-3 (10)	14-2 (3-0)
Mar. 18	Arkansas	Hawks Field	Jennings (2-0)	Korbal (0-3)		W 6-1	15-2 (3-0)
Mar. 19	Arkansas	Hawks Field	Richards (1-0)	Nesseth (2-1)		L 4-9	15-3 (3-0)
Mar. 21	Oklahoma	Hawks Field	Herr (2-0)	Duke (3-2)		W 4-2	16-3 (4-0)
Mar. 22	Oklahoma	Hawks Field	Weber (4-1)	Doyle (4-2)	Nesseth (2)	W 4-3	17-3 (5-0)
Mar. 23	Oklahoma	Hawks Field				Tie 8-8 (10)	17-3-1 (5-0-1)
Mar. 25	Northern Colorado	Hawks Field	Jennings (3-0)	Klausing (1-3)		W 10-0	18-3-1 (5-0-1)
Mar. 26	Northern Colorado	Hawks Field	Bird (1-1)	Banks (0-3)		W 9-4	19-3-1 (5-0-1)
Mar. 28	Texas	Austin, Texas	Dorn (3-0)	Shinaberry (1-1)	Jennings (1)	W 14-4	20-3-1 (6-0-1)
Mar. 29	Texas	Austin, Texas	Weber (5-1)	Wood (2-2)		W 2-0	21-3-1 (7-0-1)
Mar. 30	Texas	Austin, Texas	Boening (2-0)	Pribanic (2-1)	Green (1)	L 12-3	21-4-1 (7-1-1)

April (13–4)

Date	Opponent	Site/stadium	Win	Loss	Save	Score	Overall record (Big 12)
April 1	Creighton	Postponed until April 23 (Cold Weather)					
April 4	Texas Tech	Hawks Field	Dorn (4-0)	Karns (1-5)		W 6-2	22-4-1 (8-1-1)
April 5	Texas Tech	Hawks Field	Weber (6-1)	Ramos (1-3)	Jennings (2)	W 5-2	23-4-1 (9-1-1)
April 6	Texas Tech	Hawks Field	Pribanic (4-1)	Bettis (3-2)	Jennings (3)	W 5-3	24-4-1 (10-1-1)
April 8	Iowa	Canceled (Cold Weather)					
April 11	Oklahoma State	Stillwater, Oklahoma	Oliver (3-2)	Dorn (4-1)		L 0-1	24-5-1 (10-2-1)
April 12	Oklahoma State	Stillwater, Oklahoma	Lyons (6-2)	Weber (6-2)		L 2-19	24-6-1 (10-3-1)
April 13	Oklahoma State	Stillwater, Oklahoma	Jennings (4-0)	Blanford (3-3)		W 14-5	25-6-1 (11-3-1)
April 15	Wichita State	Hawks Field	Bird (2-1)	Kelley (4-2)	Herr (2)	W 3-0	26-6-1 (11-3-1)
April 18	Kansas	Hawks Field	Dorn (5-1)	Czyz (2-4)	Jennings (4)	W 7-6	27-6-1 (12-3-1)
April 19	Kansas	Hawks Field	Weber (7-2)	Esquibel (3-3)	Herr (3)	W 8-6	28-6-1 (13-3-1)
April 20	Kansas	Hawks Field	Walz (3-0)	Pribanic (3-2)	Smyth (7)	L 3-6	28-7-1 (13-4-1)
April 22	Creighton	Hawks Field	Jennings (5-0)	Hauer (6-2)	Nesseth (3)	W 4-3	29-7-1 (13-4-1)
April 23	Creighton	Rosenblatt Stadium	Mariot (2-0)	Moore (4-5)		W 16-7	30-7-1 (13-4-1)
April 25	Baylor	Postponed until April 26 (Rain)					
April 26	Baylor	Waco, Texas	Nesseth (3-1)	Kenpf (5-2)	Herr (4)	W 6-4 (10)	31-7-1 (14-4-1)
April 26	Baylor	Waco, Texas	Weber (8-2)	Tolleson (4-3)		W 14-1 (7)	32-7-1 (15-4-1)
April 27	Baylor	Waco, Texas	Kempf (6-2)	Pribanic (3-3)	Thurman (2)	L 3-8	32-8-1 (15-5-1)
April 29	Western Illinois	Hawks Field	Hauptman (1-0)	Percival (1-6)	Nesseth (4)	W 6-4	33-8-1 (15-5-1)
April 30	Western Illinois	Hawks Field	Bird (3-1)	Zenesek (1-2)		W 6-1	34-8-1 (15-5-1)

May (5–4)

Date	Opponent	Site/stadium	Win	Loss	Save	Score	Overall record (Big 12)
May 2	Louisiana–Lafayette	Canceled (Rain)					
May 3	Louisiana-Lafayette	Hawks Field	Herr (3-0)	Glass (2-3)		W 4-3	35-8-1 (15-5-1)
May 3	Louisiana-Lafayette	Hawks Field	Bird (4-1)	Harmon (1-2)		W 4-3 (14)	36-8-1 (15-5-1)
May 9	Texas A&M	Hawks Field	Starling (8-0)	Jennings (5-1)		L 3-6 (16)	36-9-1 (15-6-1)
May 10	Texas A&M	Postponed until May 11 (Rain)					
May 11	Texas A&M	Hawks Field	Jennings (6-1)	Thebeau (5-3)		W 9-8	37-9-1 (16-6-1)
May 11	Texas A&M	Hawks Field	Nesseth (4-1)	Minks (4-1)		W 13-10	38-9-1 (17-6-1)
May 13	Creighton	Rosenblatt Stadium	Bird (5-1)	Hellhake (3-1)	Hauptman (1)	W 8-1	39-9-1 (17-6-1)
May 16	Missouri	Columbia, Missouri	Crow (12-0)	Jennings (6-2)		L 8-1	39-10-1 (17-7-1)
May 17	Missouri	Columbia, Missouri	Berger (4-4)	Weber (8-3)	Allen (2)	L 22-9	39-11-1 (17-8-1)
May 18	Missouri	Columbia, Missouri	Zagone (2-3)	Pribanic (3-4)	Gibson (2)	L 3-7	39-12-1 (17-9-1)

Postseason
Big 12 Tournament (1–2)

Date	Opponent	Site/stadium	Win	Loss	Save	Score	Overall record (Big 12)
May 21	Baylor	Oklahoma City	Tolleson (6-4)	Jennings (6-3)	Kempf (2)	L 4-10	39-13-1
May 23	Kansas State	Oklahoma City	Dorn (6-1)	Bayuk (1-5)	Herr (5)	W 5-2	40-13-1
May 24	Oklahoma State	Oklahoma City	Lyons (11-2)	Weber (8-4)	Weinhardt (4)	L 5-11	40-14-1

== Season Facts ==
- Johnny Dorn's 13 Strike out game against Northern Colorado is his career high.
- Aaron Pribanic threw back to back complete games against UC Riverside and Northern Colorado becoming the first Husker pitcher to toss consecutive complete games since Aaron Marsden in March 2003.
- The 14-game win streak Nebraska put together tied for the fourth-longest win streak in school history and the longest since a 15-game win streak in 2000. The Huskers’ streak fell two games shy of the Big 12 record of 16 set by Kansas State (2006) and Texas Tech (2002).
- The Tie against Oklahoma on March 23 was the first tie for Nebraska since 1996 and the fourth one in league games since the Big 12 established in 1996.
- The Huskers’ 5-0-1 start in Big 12 play is their best since the league was formed in 1997. The previous start was 5-1 on four occasions, most recently in 2005.

== Awards ==
- Mitch Abeita
  - All-Big 12 First Team
  - ABCA All-Midwest Region Team
- Craig Corriston
  - Big 12 Player of the Week (03/17/2008)
  - All-Big 12 Honorable Mention
- Johnny Dorn
  - Big 12’s Co-Pitcher of the Week (03/10/2008)
  - All-Big 12 First Team
  - ABCA All-Midwest Region Second Team
  - Third-Team All-American
- Dan Jennings
  - All-Big 12 Honorable Mention
- Bryce Nimmo
  - All-Big 12 Honorable Mention
- Jake Opitz
  - All-Big 12 First Team
  - ABCA All-Midwest Region Second Team
- Nick Sullivan
  - Big 12 Player of the Week (03/24/2008)
- Thad Weber
  - All-Big 12 Second Team

== Rankings ==
Ranking movement
Poll	Pre- season	Feb 25	Mar 3	Mar 10	Mar 17	Mar 24	Mar 31	April 7	April 14	April 21	April 28	May 5	May 12	May 19	May 26	June 3	June 10	Final
USA Today/ESPN Coaches' Poll	NR	--*	NR	NR	24	17	10	6	9	8	7	7	6	7	10	--	--	23
Baseball America	NR	NR	NR	NR	22	19	11	6	9	8	6	5	5	12	13	20	20	20
Collegiate Baseball (Top 30)	38	NR	NR	NR	22	15	9	6	10	10	10	7	6	13	15	22	22	22
NCBWA (Top 35)	NR	NR	NR	NR	NR	30	22	14	13	13	9	7	6	10	13	20	20	20
Rivals.com	NR	NR	NR	NR	21	16	12	6	11	8	9	8	6	8	11	-	-	21
NR = Not ranked

* USA Today/ESPN did not release a poll after the first weekend of play.

== Huskers in the 2008 MLB draft ==
Player	Position	Round	Overall	MLB team
Aaron Pribanic	RHP	3	98	Seattle Mariners
Dan Jennings	LHP	9	168	Florida Marlins
Jake Opitz	2B	12	371	Chicago Cubs
Johnny Dorn	RHP	15	448	Florida Marlins
Thad Weber	RHP	16	493	Detroit Tigers
Mitch Abeita	C	19	590	New York Yankees
Zach Herr	LHP	38	1155	San Diego Padres
