= 2008 UCLA Bruins baseball team =

UCLA Bruins season

2008 UCLA Bruins baseball

Fullerton Regional Finals vs. Cal State Fullerton, L, 11–8 and L, 5–4
- Conference: Pacific-10 Conference
- Record: 33–27 (13–11 Pac-10)
- Head coach: John Savage (4th season)
- Assistant coaches: Matt Jones (4th season); Brian Green (4th season); P.C. Shaw (2nd season)
- Home stadium: Jackie Robinson Stadium

2008 Pacific-10 Conference baseball standings
	Conf.						Overall
Team	W		L		T	PCT	W		L		T	PCT
No. 9 Arizona State ‍†‍‍^{y}	16	–	8	–	0	.667	49	–	13	–	0	.790
No. 4 Stanford ‍‍‍	14	–	10	–	0	.583	41	–	24	–	2	.627
UCLA ‍‍‍^{y}	13	–	11	–	0	.542	33	–	27	–	0	.550
No. 13 Arizona ‍‍‍^{y}	12	–	12	–	0	.500	42	–	19	–	0	.689
California ‍‍‍	12	–	12	–	0	.500	33	–	21	–	2	.607
Washington ‍‍‍	11	–	13	–	0	.458	33	–	22	–	0	.600
Oregon State ‍‍‍^{y}	11	–	13	–	0	.458	28	–	24	–	0	.538
Southern California ‍‍‍	11	–	13	–	0	.458	28	–	28	–	0	.500
Washington State ‍‍‍	8	–	16	–	0	.333	30	–	26	–	0	.536
† – Conference champion y – Invited to the NCAA tournament As of June 30, 2007; Rankings from Collegiate Baseball

The 2008 UCLA Bruins baseball team represented the University of California, Los Angeles in the 2008 NCAA Division I baseball season. The Bruins played their home games in Jackie Robinson Stadium. UCLA finished the regular season as the #3 team in the Pacific-10 Conference behind #2 Stanford and #1 Arizona State. The Bruins made it to the 2008 NCAA Division I baseball tournament for the third year in a row, competing in the Fullerton Regionals. After beating Virginia 3–2 in the first round, the Bruins beat the number 1 seeded Cal State Fullerton Titans 11–4. Since the Titans beat Virginia in their double elimination game, the Bruins faced the Titans again in the Regional Finals. The Bruins lost 11–8 and 5–4 to the Titans to finish the season as runners-up in the Fullerton Regionals.

== Previous season ==
The 2007 season saw the Bruins finish 33–28 and third in the Pac-10 Conference behind #1 Arizona State and #2 Arizona. The 2007 season ended in the Fullerton Super Regionals when the Bruins lost two games in a row to Cal State Fullerton.

== Roster ==
2008 UCLA Bruins baseball team
Players
Coaches

#	Pos.	Name	B/T	Height	Weight	Year	Previous school	Home town
50	C	Gino Aielli	R/R	5 ft 11 in (1.8 m)	195 lb (88 kg)	Jr	Saddleback JC	Laguna Niguel, CA
12	C	Ryan Babineau	R/R	6 ft 2 in (1.88 m)	210 lb (95 kg)	Jr	Etiwanda HS	Rancho Cucamonga, CA
35	LHP	Mitchell Beacom (redshirt)	L/L	6 ft 8 in (2.03 m)	230 lb (104 kg)	Fr	University City HS	San Diego, CA
25	RHP	Charles Brewer	R/R	6 ft 5 in (1.96 m)	195 lb (88 kg)	So	Chaparral HS	Paradise Valley, AZ
7	LHP	Gavin Brooks	L/L	6 ft 3 in (1.91 m)	210 lb (95 kg)	So	Rancho Buena Vista HS	Vista, CA
11	INF	Alden Carrithers	L/R	5 ft 10 in (1.78 m)	165 lb (75 kg)	Sr	UC Santa Barbara	Portland, OR
38	RHP	Garett Claypool	R/R	6 ft 2 in (1.88 m)	175 lb (79 kg)	So	El Camino HS	West Hills, CA
44	OF	Gabe Cohen	R/R	6 ft 2 in (1.88 m)	175 lb (79 kg)	So	El Camino HS	Woodland Hills, CA
3	INF	Brandon Crawford	L/R	6 ft 2 in (1.88 m)	200 lb (91 kg)	Jr	Foothill HS	Pleasanton, CA
1	INF	Jermaine Curtis	R/R	6 ft 1 in (1.85 m)	190 lb (86 kg)	Jr	A.B. Miller HS	Fontana, CA
4	C	Brent Dean	R/R	6 ft 1 in (1.85 m)	210 lb (95 kg)	Sr	Harbor JC	Torrance, CA
6	INF	Cody Decker	R/R	6 ft 0 in (1.83 m)	225 lb (102 kg)	Jr	Santa Monica HS	Santa Monica, CA
5	OF	Brady Dolan	R/R	6 ft 1 in (1.85 m)	195 lb (88 kg)	RS Sr	Sierra JC	Reno, NV
8	LHP	Matt Drummond	L/L	6 ft 1 in (1.85 m)	180 lb (82 kg)	So	Paso Robles HS	Paso Robles, CA
9	OF	Blair Dunlap	R/R	6 ft 0 in (1.83 m)	190 lb (86 kg)	RS So	Santa Margarita HS	Mission Viejo, CA
20	OF	Raul Duran	R/R	6 ft 2 in (1.88 m)	200 lb (91 kg)	RS Fr	Saddleback HS	Santa Ana, CA
43	INF	Niko Gallego	R/R	5 ft 10 in (1.78 m)	160 lb (73 kg)	Fr	Esperanza HS	Yorba Linda, CA
49	C	Chris Giovinazzo	R/R	6 ft 1 in (1.85 m)	190 lb (86 kg)	Fr	Laguna Hills HS	Laguna Hills, CA
33	RHP	Erik Goeddel (redshirt)	R/R	6 ft 2 in (1.88 m)	175 lb (79 kg)	Fr	Bellarmine HS	Hillsborough, CA
32	LHP	Matt Grace	L/L	6 ft 4 in (1.93 m)	205 lb (93 kg)	Fr	Palos Verdes HS	Palos Verdes Estates, CA
14	INF	Casey Haerther	R/R	6 ft 2 in (1.88 m)	210 lb (95 kg)	So	Chaminade HS	Chatsworth, CA
26	RHP	J.D. Haver	R/R	6 ft 5 in (1.96 m)	200 lb (91 kg)	So	Wilson HS	Long Beach, CA
23	RHP	Dan Klein	R/R	6 ft 3 in (1.91 m)	190 lb (86 kg)	Fr	Servite HS	Los Alamitos, CA
16	OF	Brett Krill	R/R	6 ft 4 in (1.93 m)	210 lb (95 kg)	Fr	Aliso Niguel HS	Laguna Niguel, CA
34	LHP	Brendan Lafferty	L/L	6 ft 4 in (1.93 m)	200 lb (91 kg)	RS Jr	Riverside Poly HS	Riverside, CA
41	INF	Brandon Lodge (redshirt)	R/R	6 ft 2 in (1.88 m)	170 lb (77 kg)	Fr	Tesoro HS	Coto de Caza, CA
24	INF	Tim Murphy	L/L	6 ft 2 in (1.88 m)	205 lb (93 kg)	Jr	Rancho Buena Vista HS	Vista, CA
19	INF	Eddie Murray	R/R	5 ft 8 in (1.73 m)	160 lb (73 kg)	Jr	Gahr HS	Long Beach, CA
28	OF	Marc Navarro (redshirt)	L/R	5 ft 11 in (1.8 m)	180 lb (82 kg)	Fr	Santa Margarita HS	Laguna Hills, CA
40	RHP	Jason Novak	R/R	6 ft 2 in (1.88 m)	205 lb (93 kg)	Jr	Agoura HS	Agoura Hills, CA
36	OF	Dustin Quist	R/R	6 ft 2 in (1.88 m)	220 lb (100 kg)	RS So	Central HS	Fresno, CA
29	OF	Jeff Rapoport	R/R	6 ft 0 in (1.83 m)	185 lb (84 kg)	RS Fr	Westlake HS	Westlake Village, CA
27	LHP	Rob Rasmussen	L/L	5 ft 11 in (1.8 m)	160 lb (73 kg)	Fr	Pasadena Poly HS	Arcadia, CA
21	RHP	Tim Schlatter (redshirt)	R/R	6 ft 1 in (1.85 m)	185 lb (84 kg)	Jr	Sacramento CC	Lafayette, CA
15	C	Justin Uribe	L/L	5 ft 11 in (1.8 m)	180 lb (82 kg)	So	Foothill HS	Santa Ana, CA
18	OF	Mickey Weisser	L/L	5 ft 11 in (1.8 m)	205 lb (93 kg)	Sr	Sierra JC	Citrus Heights, CA

Head coach

John Savage

Assistant coach(es)

Matt Jones
Brian Green
P.C. Shaw

Legend

- (C) Team captain
- (S) Suspended
- (I) Ineligible
- Injured
- Current redshirt

Roster

== Schedule ==
2008 UCLA Bruins baseball game log
Regular season
February

#	Date	Opponent	Site/stadium	Score	Win	Loss	Save	Attendance	Overall record	Pac-10 record
1	February 23	Oklahoma	Jackie Robinson Stadium	7–5	D. Klein (1–0)	R. Duke (0–1)	None	619	1–0	–
2	February 23	Oklahoma	Jackie Robinson Stadium	3–2 ^{12}	D. Klein (1–1)	A. Doyle (1–0)	J. McCarter	619	1–1	–
–	February 24	Oklahoma	Jackie Robinson Stadium	Cancelled	–	–	–	–	1–1	–
3	February 26	Cal State Northridge	Matador Field	22–2	M. Drummond (1–0)	D. Muren (0–1)	None	221	2–1	–
4	February 27	UC Santa Barbara	Jackie Robinson Stadium	5–4 ^{13}	J. Uribe (1–0)	Z. Samuels (0–1)	None	437	3–1	–
5	February 29	Southern	Jackie Robinson Stadium	11–2	C. Brewer (1–0)	C. Donaby (0–1)	None	534	4–1	–

== Rankings ==
Ranking movement Legend: ██ Increase in ranking. ██ Decrease in ranking. ██ Not ranked the previous week. NR = Not ranked. RV = Receiving votes.
Poll	Pre- season	Feb. 25	Mar. 3	Mar. 10	Mar. 17	Mar. 24	Mar. 31	Apr. 7	Apr. 14	Apr. 21	Apr. 28	May 5	May 12	May 19	May 26	June 3	June 10	Final Poll
Coaches' Poll																		
Baseball America																		
Collegiate Baseball^	18	19	15	23	20	NR	NR	NR	NR	NR	NR	NR	NR	NR	NR	NR	NR	NR
NCBWA†	19	21	15	19	17	24	28	RV	RV	NR	NR	NR	NR	NR	NR	RV	RV	RV
Rivals.com																		
^ Collegiate Baseball ranked 40 teams in their preseason poll, but will only rank 30 teams weekly during the season. † NCBWA ranked 35 teams in their preseason poll, but will only rank 30 teams weekly during the season.

== UCLA Bruins in the 2008 MLB draft ==
The following members of the UCLA Bruins baseball program were drafted in the 2008 Major League Baseball draft.

Player	Position	Round	Overall	MLB team
Timothy Murphy	LHP	3rd	89th	Texas Rangers
Brandon Crawford	SS	4th	117th	San Francisco Giants
Jermaine Curtis	3B	5th	155th	St. Louis Cardinals
Alden Carrithers	2B	15th	463rd	Detroit Tigers
Ryan Babineau	C	17th	528th	Arizona Diamondbacks
