= 2008 Kentucky Wildcats baseball team =

2008 season of University of Kentucky baseball team

2008 Kentucky Wildcats baseball

NCAA Tournament, Regional Final
- Conference: Southeastern Conference
- Eastern

Ranking
- Coaches: No. 25
- Record: 44–19 (16–14 SEC)
- Head coach: John Cohen
- Home stadium: Cliff Hagan Stadium

2008 Southeastern Conference baseball standings
	Conf.				Overall
Team	W		L	PCT	W		L	PCT
Eastern
No. 2 Georgia ^{x}‍†‍‍^{y}	20	–	9	.690	45	–	25	.643
Florida ‍‍‍^{y}	17	–	13	.567	34	–	24	.586
No. 25 Kentucky ‍‍‍^{y}	16	–	14	.533	44	–	19	.698
Vanderbilt ‍‍‍^{y}	15	–	14	.517	41	–	22	.651
South Carolina ‍‍‍^{y}	15	–	15	.500	40	–	23	.635
Tennessee ‍‍‍	12	–	18	.400	27	–	29	.482
Western
No. 6 LSU ^{x}‍‍‡‍^{y}	18	–	11	.621	49	–	19	.721
Alabama ‍‍‍^{y}	16	–	14	.533	35	–	28	.556
Ole Miss ‍‍‍^{y}	15	–	15	.500	39	–	26	.600
Arkansas ‍‍‍^{y}	14	–	15	.483	34	–	24	.586
Auburn ‍‍‍	11	–	19	.367	28	–	28	.500
Mississippi State ‍‍‍	9	–	21	.300	23	–	33	.411
x – Division champion † – Conference champion ‡ – Tournament champion y – Invited to the NCAA tournament As of June 30, 2008; Rankings from Coaches' Poll

The 2008 Kentucky Wildcats baseball team represented the University of Kentucky in the NCAA Division I baseball season of 2008. The team's head coach was John Cohen. This was his 5th year as Kentucky's head coach. The Wildcats played their home games at Cliff Hagan Stadium in Lexington, Kentucky.
