= 2008 Louisiana–Lafayette Ragin' Cajuns baseball team =

American college baseball season

2008 Louisiana–Lafayette Ragin' Cajuns baseball
- Conference: Sun Belt Conference
- Record: 30–29 (16–14 SBC)
- Head coach: Tony Robichaux (14th season)
- Assistant coaches: Anthony Babineaux; Michael Trahan
- Home stadium: M. L. Tigue Moore Field

2008 Sun Belt Conference baseball standings
	Conf.						Overall
Team	W		L		PCT		W	L		PCT
Louisiana–Monroe ‍†‍‍	20	–	10	–	0	.667		34	–	24	–	0	.586
New Orleans ‍‍‍^{y}	18	–	11	–	0	.621		43	–	21	–	0	.672
Troy ‍‍‍	18	–	12	–	0	.600		32	–	26	–	0	.552
Florida Atlantic ‍‍‍	15	–	12	–	1	.554		32	–	27	–	1	.542
Western Kentucky ‍‍‡‍^{y}	16	–	14	–	0	.533		33	–	27	–	1	.549
Louisiana–Lafayette ‍‍‍	16	–	14	–	0	.533		30	–	29	–	0	.508
South Alabama ‍‍‍	15	–	15	–	0	.500		33	–	25	–	0	.569
Middle Tennessee ‍‍‍	13	–	16	–	0	.448		27	–	29	–	1	.482
FIU ‍‍‍	12	–	18	–	0	.400		20	–	36	–	0	.357
Arkansas–Little Rock ‍‍‍	10	–	18	–	0	.357		16	–	32	–	0	.333
Arkansas State ‍‍‍	8	–	21	–	1	.283		20	–	34	–	1	.373
† – Conference champion ‡ – Tournament champion y – Invited to the NCAA tournament As of June 30, 2008; Rankings from Collegiate Baseball

The 2008 Louisiana–Lafayette Ragin' Cajuns baseball team represented the University of Louisiana at Lafayette in the 2008 NCAA Division I baseball season. The Ragin' Cajuns played their home games at M. L. Tigue Moore Field and were led by fourteenth year head coach Tony Robichaux.

== Roster ==
2008 Louisiana–Lafayette Ragin' Cajuns roster
Pitchers: 5 Randall Bulliard – Redshirt Freshman; 8 Luke Wagley – Junior; 15 Justin Robichaux – Sophomore; 16 Kendall Gilmore – Redshirt Freshman; 18 Hunter Moody – Senior; 19 Gregory Harmon – Junior; 20 Matt Broussard – Junior; 21 Dayton Marze – Redshirt Freshman; 23 Michael Cook – Redshirt Freshman; 26 Corey Chapman – Junior; 27 Danny Farquhar – Junior; 29 Buddy Glass – Senior; 30 Blake Wascom – Redshirt Freshman; 33 Blake Haagen – Junior; 34 John Zorich – Senior; 37 Brent Solich – Senior; 42 Dane Maxwell – Redshirt Freshman; 43 Patrick Holloway – Redshirt Freshman; RS Leif DuBois – Redshirt Freshman; RS T.J. Gros – Junior; RS Greg Wilborn – Junior; RS Ethan Hebert – Redshirt Freshman	Catchers: 6 Dillon Guillory – Redshirt Freshman; 11 Scott Hawkins – Junior; 17 Thad Griffen – Redshirt Freshman; 22 Blaine Lafleur – Junior; 40 Chance Harst – Sophomore; Infielders: 1 Greg Fontenot – Redshirt Freshman; 2 Matt Hicks – Junior; 7 William Long – Sophomore; 9 Jordan Poirrier – Sophomore; 12 Tyler Benzel – Redshirt Freshman; 31 Cy Primeaux – Junior; 35 Grant Derouen – Sophomore; RS Jim Simon – Redshirt Freshman; Outfielders: 4 Josh Logan – Senior; 10 Nolan Gisclair – Senior; 13 Travis Whipple – Redshirt Freshman; 24 Matt Goulas – Redshirt Freshman; 25 Brian Bowman – Redshirt Freshman; 28 Gabe Begneaud – Redshirt Freshman; 32 Andre Robichaux – Redshirt Freshman; 39 Kolin Hatfield – Senior

=== Coaching staff ===
2008 Louisiana–Lafayette Ragin' Cajuns coaching staff
- Tony Robichaux – Head coach – 14th year
- Anthony Babineaux – Associate head coach – 14th year
- Michael Trahan – Assistant head coach – 1st year
- Chris Domingue – Director of baseball operations – 6th year

== Schedule and results ==
Legend
	Louisiana–Lafayette win
	Louisiana–Lafayette loss
	Postponement
**Bold**	Louisiana-Lafayette team member

2008 Louisiana–Lafayette Ragin' Cajuns baseball game log
Regular season (28–27)

February (2–4)
Date	Opponent	Site/stadium	Score	TV	Overall record	SBC record
UTSA Baseball Classic
Feb. 22	vs. Army	Roadrunner Field • San Antonio, TX	**W** 2–1		1–0	
Feb. 23	vs. Texas Tech	Roadrunner Field • San Antonio, TX	**W** 4–0		2–0	
Feb. 23	vs. Oral Roberts	Roadrunner Field • San Antonio, TX	**L** 5–6		2–1	
Feb. 24	at UTSA	Roadrunner Field • San Antonio, TX	**L** 2–5		2–2	
Feb. 27	at Tulane	Greer Field at Turchin Stadium • New Orleans, LA	**L** 1–10		2–3	
Feb. 29	Southern Miss	M. L. Tigue Moore Field • Lafayette, LA	**L** 0–6		2–4	

March (9–10)
Date	Opponent	Site/stadium	Score	TV	Overall record	SBC record
Mar. 1	Miami (OH)	M. L. Tigue Moore Field • Lafayette, LA	**L** 1–3		2–5	
Mar. 2	Southern Miss	M. L. Tigue Moore Field • Lafayette, LA	**W** 2–0		3–5	
Mar. 4	at Houston	Cougar Field • Houston, TX	**L** 8–14		3–6	
Mar. 5	Southeastern Louisiana	M. L. Tigue Moore Field • Lafayette, LA	**W** 3–1		4–6	
Mar. 8	Arkansas State	M. L. Tigue Moore Field • Lafayette, LA	**L** 0–3		4–7	0–1
Mar. 8	Arkansas State	M. L. Tigue Moore Field • Lafayette, LA	**L** 5–9		4–8	0–2
Mar. 9	Arkansas State	M. L. Tigue Moore Field • Lafayette, LA	**L** 2–9		4–9	0–3
Mar. 11	at Louisiana Tech	J. C. Love Field at Pat Patterson Park • Ruston, LA	**W** 11–2		5–9	
Mar. 14	at Florida Atlantic	FAU Baseball Stadium • Boca Raton, FL	**L** 6–13		5–10	0–4
Mar. 15	at Florida Atlantic	FAU Baseball Stadium • Boca Raton, FL	**W** 9–3		6–10	1–4
Mar. 16	at Florida Atlantic	FAU Baseball Stadium • Boca Raton, FL	**L** 2–9		6–11	1–5
Mar. 19	at No. 14 Rice	Reckling Park • Houston, TX	**L** 6–17		6–12	
Mar. 21	at Arkansas–Little Rock	Gary Hogan Field • Little Rock, AR	**W** 12–1		7–12	2–5
Mar. 22	at Arkansas–Little Rock	Gary Hogan Field • Little Rock, AR	**W** 7–6		8–12	3–5
Mar. 23	at Arkansas–Little Rock	Gary Hogan Field • Little Rock, AR	**W** 8–7		9–12	4–5
Mar. 26	at Northwestern State	H. Alvin Brown–C. C. Stroud Field • Natchitoches, LA	**W** 7–6		10–12	
Mar. 28	FIU	M. L. Tigue Moore Field • Lafayette, LA	**L** 1–9		10–13	4–6
Mar. 29	FIU	M. L. Tigue Moore Field • Lafayette, LA	**W** 5–2		11–13	5–6
Mar. 30	FIU	M. L. Tigue Moore Field • Lafayette, LA	**L** 4–8		11–14	5–7

April (11–9)
Date	Opponent	Site/stadium	Score	TV	Overall record	SBC record
Apr. 1	Lamar	M. L. Tigue Moore Field • Lafayette, LA	**W** 3–2		12–14	
Apr. 5	at Middle Tennessee	Reese Smith Jr. Field • Murfreesboro, TN	**L** 1–2		12–15	5–8
Apr. 5	at Middle Tennessee	Reese Smith Jr. Field • Murfreesboro, TN	**W** 4–2		13–15	6–8
Apr. 6	at Middle Tennessee	M. L. Tigue Moore Field • Lafayette, LA	**W** 8–4		14–15	7–8
Apr. 8	Northwestern State	M. L. Tigue Moore Field • Lafayette, LA	**W** 9–2		15–15	
Apr. 9	at McNeese State	Joe Miller Ballpark • Lake Charles, LA	**W** 14–8		16–15	
Apr. 11	Louisiana–Monroe	M. L. Tigue Moore Field • Lafayette, LA	**W** 12–10		17–15	8–8
Apr. 12	Louisiana–Monroe	M. L. Tigue Moore Field • Lafayette, LA	**L** 6–15		17–16	8–9
Apr. 13	Louisiana–Monroe	M. L. Tigue Moore Field • Lafayette, LA	**L** 4–14		17–17	8–10
Apr. 15	at Northwestern State	H. Alvin Brown–C. C. Stroud Field • Natchitoches, LA	**L** 2–3		17–18	
Apr. 16	Northwestern State	M. L. Tigue Moore Field • Lafayette, LA	**W** 4–3		18–18	
Apr. 18	at South Alabama	Eddie Stanky Field • Mobile, AL	**W** 9–3		19–18	9–10
Apr. 19	at South Alabama	Eddie Stanky Field • Mobile, AL	**L** 2–9		19–19	9–11
Apr. 20	at South Alabama	Eddie Stanky Field • Mobile, AL	**W** 8–6		20–19	10–11
Apr. 22	at Lamar	Vincent–Beck Stadium • Beaumont, TX	**L** 0–3		20–20	
Apr. 23	at Southeastern Louisiana	Pat Kenelly Diamond at Alumni Field • Hammond, LA	**L** 4–14		20–21	
Apr. 25	Troy	M. L. Tigue Moore Field • Lafayette, LA	**W** 7–3		21–21	11–11
Apr. 26	Troy	M. L. Tigue Moore Field • Lafayette, LA	**W** 5–3		22–21	12–11
Apr. 26	Troy	M. L. Tigue Moore Field • Lafayette, LA	**L** 4–11		22–22	12–12
Apr. 29	at LSU	Alex Box Stadium • Baton Rouge, LA	**L** 3–5		22–23	

May (6–4)
Date	Opponent	Site/stadium	Score	TV	Overall record	SBC record
May 3	at No. 10 Nebraska	Hawks Field • Lincoln, NE	**L** 3–4		23–23	
May 3	at No. 10 Nebraska	Hawks Field • Lincoln, NE	**L** 3–4		23–24	
May 6	Louisiana Tech	M. L. Tigue Moore Field • Lafayette, LA	**W** 4–3		24–24	
May 7	McNeese State	M. L. Tigue Moore Field • Lafayette, LA	**W** 5–4		25–24	
May 9	at Western Kentucky	Nick Denes Field • Bowling Green, KY	**W** 9–8		26–24	13–12
May 10	at Western Kentucky	Nick Denes Field • Bowling Green, KY	**L** 4–11		26–25	13–13
May 11	at Western Kentucky	Nick Denes Field • Bowling Green, KY	**L** 4–13		26–26	13–14
May 15	No. 22 New Orleans	M. L. Tigue Moore Field • Lafayette, LA	**W** 4–2		27–26	14–14
May 16	No. 22 New Orleans	M. L. Tigue Moore Field • Lafayette, LA	**W** 11–8		28–26	15–14
May 17	No. 22 New Orleans	M. L. Tigue Moore Field • Lafayette, LA	**W** 6–5		28–27	16–14

Postseason (2–2)

SBC Tournament (2–2)
Date	Opponent	Site/stadium	Score	TV	Overall record	SBC record
May 21	vs. Troy	M. L. Tigue Moore Field • Lafayette, LA	**W** 6–1		29–27	
May 23	vs. South Alabama	M. L. Tigue Moore Field • Lafayette, LA	**W** 8–1		30–27	
May 24	vs. New Orleans	M. L. Tigue Moore Field • Lafayette, LA	**L** 0–10		30–28	
May 24	vs. New Orleans	M. L. Tigue Moore Field • Lafayette, LA	**L** 5–6		30–29	

Schedule source:

- Rankings are based on the team's current ranking in the Collegiate Baseball poll.
