= 2008 Wichita State Shockers baseball team =

American college baseball season

2008 Wichita State Shockers baseball

MVC champion MVC Tournament champion

NCAA tournament, Super Regional
- Conference: Missouri Valley Conference

Ranking
- Coaches: No. 13
- CB: No. 12
- Record: 48-17 (19-5 Missouri Valley)
- Head coach: Gene Stephenson (31st season)
- Assistant coaches: Bret Kemnitz; Jim Thomas
- Home stadium: Eck Stadium

2008 Missouri Valley Conference baseball standings
	Conf.				Overall
Team	W		L	PCT	W		L	PCT
No. 13 Wichita State† ‍‍‍	19	–	5	.792	48	–	17	.738
Missouri State ‍‍‍	18	–	6	.750	40	–	17	.702
Creighton ‍‍‍	16	–	8	.667	37	–	21	.638
Northern Iowa ‍‍‍	14	–	10	.583	30	–	24	.556
Southern Illinois ‍‍‍	12	–	12	.500	34	–	23	.596
Bradley ‍‍‍	10	–	14	.417	26	–	28	.481
Indiana State ‍‍‍	9	–	15	.375	18	–	32	.360
Illinois State ‍‍‍	6	–	18	.250	22	–	30	.423
Evansville ‍‍‍	4	–	20	.167	14	–	42	.250
† – Conference champion y – Invited to the NCAA tournament As of April 12, 2020; Rankings from Baseball America

The 2008 Wichita State Shockers baseball team represented Wichita State University in the 2008 NCAA Division I baseball season. The Shockers played their home games at Eck Stadium under 31st year coach Gene Stephenson.

== Previous season ==
The 2007 Wichita State Shockers baseball team finished the year 53-22 overall and 20–4 in the Missouri Valley Conference. The Shockers had their own Super Regional. In the first game, Wichita State would lose 6–7 to New Orleans. In the losers' bracket they would beat Oral Roberts 11–4, a rematch win against New Orleans 7–3, and would beat Arizona in the next two games 4-3, then 3–0 in the Regional Finals. In the Super Regionals, the Shockers would lose to UC Irvine 0-1, then 2–3.

=== 2007 MLB draft ===
The Shockers had ten players drafted in the 2007 MLB draft.

Player	Position	Round	Overall	MLB team
Pete Kozma*	Shortstop	1	18	St. Louis Cardinals
Jon Gilmore*	Infield/Pitcher	1-s	33	Atlanta Braves
Derek Norris*	Catcher	4	130	Washington Nationals
Travis Banwart	Pitcher	4	150	Oakland Athletics
Damon Sublett	Second baseman	7	244	New York Yankees
Matt Brown	Outfield	13	407	Cleveland Indians
Noah Krol	Pitcher	17	541	Detroit Tigers
**Josh Workman**	Second baseman	23	722	Minnesota Twins
**Kenneth Williams**	Outfield	32	971	Colorado Rockies
Kyle Touchatt	Pitcher	34	1026	Baltimore Orioles
**Tyler Fleming**	Pitcher	39	1179	Texas Rangers
Ronnie Morales	Pitcher	45	1342	Chicago White Sox
**Nick Cobler**	Pitcher	49	1431	Minnesota Twins

- Peter Kozma was expected to play for Wichita State, but was drafted and signed with the St. Louis Cardinals.
- Jon Gilmore was expected to play for Wichita State, but was drafted and signed with the Atlanta Braves.
- Derek Norris was expected to play for Wichita State, but was drafted and signed with the Washington Nationals.

Players in bold are signees drafted from high school, community colleges that will attend Wichita State or attendees that will stay for the 2008 season.

== Roster ==
2008 Wichita State roster
Pitchers: 3 Logan Hoch - Junior; 4 Tyler Fleming - Junior; 15 Cameron Maldonado - Freshman; 21 Matt Smith - Junior; 23 Clint Maune - Freshman; 26 Any Womack - Senior; 27 Tyson Fugett -Sophomore; 29 Rob Musgrave - Senior; 32 Max Huston - Senior; 35 Anthony Capra - Junior; 36 Tim Kelley - RS Freshman; 41 Aaron Shafer - Junior; 42 Khol Nanney - RS Senior	Catchers: 12 Tyler Weber - Senior; Infielders: 1 Kyle Sisney - RS Freshman; 7 Taylor Brown - Freshman; 19 Roberto Rios - Junior; 22 Josh Workman - RS Junior; 34 Conor Gillaspie - Junior	Outfielders: 2 Bret Bascue - RS Sophomore; 9 Andy Dirks - Senior; 11 Kenny Williams Jr. - RS Junior; 13 Ryan Jones - Sophomore; 18 Kevin Hall - Freshman; Utility: 6 Remington Johnson (1B/P) - Freshman; 8 Dusty Coleman (INF/P) - Sophomore; 14 Ryan Engrav (UTIL) - Freshman; 16 Grant Muncrief (3B/P) - Freshman; 17 Justin Kemp (C/P) - Freshman; 20 Mitch Caster (OF/P) - Freshman; 31 Clint McKeever (1B/P) - RS Sophomore; 33 Cody Lassley (UTIL) - RS Sophomore; 38 Tyler Hill (UTIL) - Junior; Source:

== Schedule and results ==
Legend
	Wichita State win
	Wichita State loss
	Postponement
**Bold**	Wichita State team member

2008 Wichita State Shockers baseball game log
Regular season (41–15)

February (3–1)
Date	Opponent	Rank	Site/stadium	Score	Win	Loss	Save	TV	Attendance	Overall record	MVC record
Feb. 22	Fordham	No. 20	Eck Stadium • Wichita, KS	**W** 4-3	**Nanney** (1-0)	Mack (0-1)				1-0	
Feb. 24	Fordham	No. 20	Eck Stadium • Wichita, KS							1-0	
Feb. 24	Fordham	No. 20	Eck Stadium • Wichita, KS							1-0	
Feb 25	Northwestern College	No. 20	Eck Stadium • Wichita, KS	**W** 10-1	**Shafer** (1-0)	Burlea (1-1)				2-0	
Feb. 26	Emporia State	No. 20	Eck Stadium • Wichita, KS	**W** 6-3	**Kelley** (1-0)					3-0	
Feb. 29	at No. 10 Long Beach State	No. 20	Blair Field • Long Beach, CA	**L** 2-3^{12}	Vincent	**Womack**(0-1)				3-1	

March (17–2)
Date	Opponent	Rank	Site/stadium	Score	Win	Loss	Save	TV	Attendance	Overall record	MVC record
Mar. 1	at No. 10 Long Beach State	No. 20	Blair Field • Long Beach, CA	**L** 5-8	Worley	**Shafer** (1-1)	Roberts			3-2	
March 2	at No. 10 Long Beach State	No. 20	Blair Field • Long Beach, CA	**L** 3-8	Thompson	**Kelley** (1-1)				3-3	
Mar. 4	Le Moyne	No. 25	Eck Stadium • Wichita, KS	**W** 9-8	**Nanney** (2-0)					4-3	
Mar. 8	Harvard	No. 25	Eck Stadium • Wichita, KS	**W** 16-3	**Musgrave** (1-0)					5-3	
Mar. 8	Harvard	No. 25	Eck Stadium • Wichita, KS	**W** 11-10^{10}	**Fleming** (1-0)					6-3	
Mar. 9	Harvard	No. 25	Eck Stadium • Wichita, KS	**W** 13-2	**Capra** (1-0)					7-3	
Mar. 12	Washington State	No. 24	Eck Stadium • Wichita, KS	**W** 6-4	**Fleming** (2-0)	Way (0-1)				8-3	
Mar. 14	TCU	No. 24	Eck Stadium • Wichita, KS	**W** 5-1	**Musgrave** (2-0)					9-3	
Mar. 15	TCU	No. 24	Eck Stadium • Wichita, KS	**W** 3-2	**Shafer** (2-1)					10-3	
Mar. 16	TCU	No. 24	Eck Stadium • Wichita, KS	**W** 5-1	**Capra** (2-0)					11-3	
Mar. 18	at Oral Roberts	No. 20	J. L. Johnson Stadium • Tulsa, OK							11-3	
Mar. 22	at Illinois State	No. 20	Duffy Bass Field • Normal, IL	**W** 12-1^{7}	**Musgrave** (3-0)					12-3	1-0
Mar. 22	at Illinois State	No. 20	Duffy Bass Field • Normal, IL	**W** 6-4	**Shafer** (3-1)					13-3	2-0
Mar. 23	at Illinois State	No. 20	Duffy Bass Field • Normal, IL	**W** 7-2	**Capra** (3-0)					14-3	3-0
Mar. 25	Binghamton	No. 16	Eck Stadium • Wichita, KS	**W** 9-2	**Kelley** (2-1)					15-3	
Mar. 26	Binghamton	No. 16	Eck Stadium • Wichita, KS	**W** 13-8	**Maune** (1-0)					16-3	
Mar. 28	North Dakota State	No. 16	Eck Stadium • Wichita, KS	**W** 14-3	**Musgrave** (4-0)					17-3	
Mar. 29	North Dakota State	No. 16	Eck Stadium • Wichita, KS	**W** 6-1^{7}	**Shafer** (4-1)					18-3	
Mar. 29	North Dakota State	No. 16	Eck Stadium • Wichita, KS	**W** 8-1^{7}	**Capra** (4-0)					19-3	
Mar. 30	North Dakota State	No. 16	Eck Stadium • Wichita, KS	**W** 9-5	**Nanney** (3-0)					20-3	

April (13–8)
Date	Opponent	Rank	Site/stadium	Score	Win	Loss	Save	TV	Attendance	Overall record	MVC record
Apr. 1	at Kansas	No. 12	Hoglund Ballpark • Lawrence, KS	**W** 7-3	**Kelley** (3-1)					21-3	
Apr. 2	Oral Roberts	No. 12	Eck Stadium • Wichita, KS	**W** 10-8	**Nanney** (4-0)					22-3	
Apr. 4	Missouri State	No. 12	Eck Stadium • Wichita, KS	**L** 4-7^{10}		**Fleming** (2-1)				22-4	3-1
Apr. 5	Missouri State	No. 12	Eck Stadium • Wichita, KS	**W** 19-8^{8}	**Shafer** (5-1)					23-4	4-1
Apr. 6	Missouri State	No. 12	Eck Stadium • Wichita, KS	**W** 9-5	**Capra** (5-0)					24-4	5-1
Apr. 8	at Kansas State	No. 9	Frank Myers Field at Tointon Family Stadium • Manhattan, KS	**W** 4-3	**Kelley** (4-1)		**Nanney** (1)	Kansas Now 22		25-4	
Apr. 9	Oklahoma	No. 9	Eck Stadium • Wichita, KS							25-4	
Apr. 12	vs. Creighton	No. 9	Johnny Rosenblatt Stadium • Omaha, NE	**L** 3-7		**Musgrave** (4-1)		Kansas Now 22		25-5	5-2
Apr. 13	vs. Creighton	No. 9	Johnny Rosenblatt Stadium • Omaha, NE	**W** 11-3	**Shafer** (6-1)			CSTV		26-5	6-2
Apr. 13	vs. Creighton	No. 9	Johnny Rosenblatt Stadium • Omaha, NE	**W** 3-2	**Capra** (6-0)		**Nanney** (2)			27-5	7-2
Apr. 15	at No. 9 Nebraska	No. 7	Haymarket Park • Lincoln, NE	**L** 0-3	**Bird** (2-1)	**Kelley** (4-2)		Kansas Now 22		27-6	
Apr. 17	Tabor College	No. 7	Eck Stadium • Wichita, KS	**W** 10-1	**Maune** (2-0)					28-6	
Apr. 18	Southern Illinois	No. 7	Eck Stadium • Wichita, KS	**W'** 10-0^{7}	**Musgrave** (5-1)					29-6	8-2
Apr. 19	Southern Illinois	No. 7	Eck Stadium • Wichita, KS	**L** 0-3		**Shafer** (6-2)				29-7	8-3
Apr. 20	Southern Illinois	No. 7	Eck Stadium • Wichita, KS	**W** 8-3	**Capra** (7-0)					30-7	9-3
Apr. 22	Kansas	No. 14	Eck Stadium • Wichita, KS	**W** 6-4	**Fleming** (3-1)		**Nanney** (3)	Kansas Now 22		31-7	
Apr. 23	at No. 13 Oklahoma State	No. 14	Allie P. Reynolds Stadium • Stillwater, OK	**L** 3-5		**Hoch** (0-1)		Kansas Now 22		31-8	
Apr. 25	at Indiana State	No. 14	Sycamore Stadium • Terre Haute, IN	**W** 14-7	**Shafer** (7-2)					32-8	10-3
Apr. 26	at Indiana State	No. 14	Sycamore Stadium • Terre Haute, IN	**W** 11-2	**Musgrave** (6-1)					33-8	11-3
Apr. 27	at Indiana State	No. 14	Sycamore Stadium • Terre Haute, IN	**L** 7-8		**Coleman** (0-1)				33-9	11-4
Apr. 29	Kansas State	No. 14	Eck Stadium • Wichita, KS	**L** 2-3		**Nanney** (4-1)				33-10	
Apr. 30	at Oklahoma	No. 14	L. Dale Mitchell Baseball Park • Norman, OK	**L** 11-12^{10}		**Kemp** (0-1)		Kansas Now 22		33-11	

May (8–4)
Date	Opponent	Rank	Site/stadium	Score	Win	Loss	Save	TV	Attendance	Overall record	MVC record
May 2	Northern Iowa	No. 14	Eck Stadium • Wichita, KS	**W** 6-1	**Musgrave** (7-1)					34-11	12-4
May 3	Northern Iowa	No. 14	Eck Stadium • Wichita, KS	**W** 5-3	**Shafer** (8-2)		**Nanney** (4)			35-11	13-4
May 4	Northern Iowa	No. 14	Eck Stadium • Wichita, KS	**W** 6-5	**Hoch** (1-1)					36-11	14-4
May 6	Central Arkansas	No. 14	Eck Stadium • Wichita, KS	**L** 9-10		**Kemp** (0-2)				36-12	
May 7	No. 3 Arizona State	No. 14	Eck Stadium • Wichita, KS	**L** 1-6		**Kelley** (4-3)		Kansas Now 22		36-13	
May 9	at Evansville	No. 14	Charles H. Braun Stadium • Evansville, IN	**W** 15-8	**Musgrave** (8-1)	Taylor (2-5)		Kansas Now 22		37-13	15-4
May 10	at Evansville	No. 14	Charles H. Braun • Evansville, IN	**L** 3-6	Foley (5-4)	**Shafer** (8-3)		Kansas Now 22		37-14	15-5
May 11	at Evansville	No. 14	Charles H. Braun • Evansville, IN	**W** 16-3^{7}	**Capra** (8-0)					38-14	16-5
May 13	Oral Roberts	No. 22	Eck Stadium • Wichita, KS	**L** 0-12	Minissale (2-3)	**Kelley** (4-4)				38-15	
May 15	Bradley	No. 22	Eck Stadium • Wichita, KS	**W** 10-0^{8}	**Musgrove** (9-1)	Wright (3-6)		Kansas Now 22		39-15	17-5
May 16	Bradley	No. 22	Eck Stadium • Wichita, KS	**W** 9-3	**Shafer** (9-3)	Scahill (4-5)				40-15	18-5
May 17	Bradley	No. 22	Eck Stadium • Wichita, KS	**W** 21-5^{7}	**Capra** (9-0)					41-15	19-5

Postseason (7–2)

Missouri Valley Conference Tournament (3–0)
Date	Opponent	Rank	Site/stadium	Score	Win	Loss	Save	TV	Attendance	Overall record	MVC record
May 22	Southern Illinois	No. 23	Eck Stadium • Wichita, KS	**W** 12-0^{7}	**Musgrave** (10-1)					42-15	
May 23	Missouri State	No. 23	Eck Stadium • Wichita, KS	**W** 20-3^{7}	**Shafer** (10-3)					43-15	
May 24	Missouri State	No. 23	Eck Stadium • Wichita, KS	**W** 12-10	**Nanney** (5-1)					44-15	

Stillwater Regional (3–0)
Date	Opponent	Rank	Site/stadium	Score	Win	Loss	Save	TV	Attendance	Overall record	MVC record
May 30	No. 18 TCU	No. 21	Allie P. Reynolds Stadium • Stillwater, OK	**W** 8-5	**Musgrave** (11-1)	Lockwood (7-2)				45-15	
May 31	at No. 5 Oklahoma State	No. 21	Allie P. Reynolds Stadium • Stillwater, OK	**W** 5-3	**Shafer** (11-3)					46-15	
Jun. 1	No. 5 Oklahoma State	No. 21	Allie P. Reynolds Stadium • Stillwater, OK	**W** 11-7^{10}	**Hoch** (2-1)					47-15	

Tallahassee Super Regional (1–2)
Date	Opponent	Rank	Site/stadium	Score	Win	Loss	Save	TV	Attendance	Overall record	MVC record
Jun. 6	at No. 2 Florida State	No. 13	Dick Howser Stadium • Tallahassee, FL	**W** 10-7	**Musgrave** (12-1)	Villanueva (7-3)	**Capra** (1)	ESPN2		48-15	
Jun. 7	at No. 2 Florida State	No. 13	Dick Howser Stadium • Tallahassee, FL	**L** 4-14	Fairel (12-2)	**Shafer** (11-4)		ESPN2		48-16	
Jun. 8	at No. 2 Florida State	No. 13	Dick Howser Stadium • Tallahassee, FL	**L** 4-11		**Capra** (9-1)		ESPN		48-17	

== Rankings ==
Ranking movements Legend: ██ Increase in ranking ██ Decrease in ranking
	Week																	
Poll	Pre	1	2	3	4	5	6	7	8	9	10	11	12	13	14	15	16	Final
Coaches'	10	10*	21	16	11	11	5	6	7	8	10	15	14	14	14	14*	14*	13
Baseball America	20	20	25	24	20	16	12	9	7	14	14	14	22	23	21	13	13	13
Collegiate Baseball^	9	7	23	27	24	16	8	5	5	7	9	15	19	20	18	11	12	12
NCBWA†	10	10	17	15	15	13	8	5	6	8	11	13	18	18	16	12	15	15

^ Collegiate Baseball ranked 40 teams in their preseason poll, but only ranked 30 teams weekly during the season.
† NCBWA ranks 30 teams in their preseason poll, but only ranks 25 teams weekly during the season.
* A new poll was not released for this week, so for comparison purposes, the previous week's ranking is inserted in this week's slot.
