= 2008 NCAA Division I baseball rankings =

2008 NCAA Division I baseball season
- Duration: February 22–June 25, 2008
- Number of teams: 298
- Preseason No. 1: Arizona State

Tournament
- Duration: May 30–June 25, 2008
- Most conference bids: SEC (9)

College World Series
- Duration: June 14–June 25, 2008
- Champions: Fresno State (1st title)
- Runners-up: Georgia
- MOP: Tommy Mendonca

Seasons
- ← 2007 2009 →

The following polls make up the 2008 NCAA Division I baseball rankings. USA Today and ESPN began publishing the Coaches' Poll of 31 active coaches ranking the top 25 teams in the nation in 1992. Each coach is a member of the American Baseball Coaches Association. Baseball America began publishing its poll of the top 20 teams in college baseball in 1981. Beginning with the 1985 season, it expanded to the top 25. Collegiate Baseball Newspaper published its first human poll of the top 20 teams in college baseball in 1957, and expanded to rank the top 30 teams in 1961.

== Legend ==
| | Increase in ranking |
| | Decrease in ranking |
| | Not ranked previous week |
| Italics | Number of first place votes |
| (#-#) | Win–loss record |
| т | Tied with team above or below also with this symbol |

== USA Today/ESPN Coaches' Poll ==
| | Preseason Jan 21 | Week 2 Mar 3 | Week 3 Mar 10 | Week 4 Mar 17 | Week 5 Mar 24 | Week 6 Mar 31 | Week 7 Apr 7 | Week 8 Apr 14 | Week 9 Apr 21 | Week 10 Apr 28 | Week 11 May 5 | Week 12 May 12 | Week 13 May 19 | Week 14 May 26 | Final Jun 26 | |
|---|---|---|---|---|---|---|---|---|---|---|---|---|---|---|---|---|
| 1. | Arizona State (12) | Arizona State (7-0) | Arizona State (12-0) | Arizona State (17-0) | Arizona State (22-1) | Arizona State (25-1) | Miami (FL) (26-2) | Miami (FL) (30-3) | Miami (FL) (33-4) | Miami (FL) (36-5) | Miami (FL) (39-5) | Miami (FL) (41-6) | North Carolina (45-10) | Miami (FL) (47-8) | Fresno State (47-31) | 1. |
| 2. | North Carolina (2) | North Carolina (7-1) | Arizona (10-1) | Arizona (12-2) | Florida State (19-2) | Miami (FL) (21-2) | Florida State (28-3) | Florida State (31-3) | Florida State (34-5) | North Carolina (38-8) | North Carolina (38-8) | North Carolina (42-9) | Miami (FL) (43-8) | North Carolina (46-12) | Georgia (45-25) | 2. |
| 3. | South Carolina | Arizona (5-1) | North Carolina (10-2) | Florida State (16-1) | Miami (FL) (17-2) | Florida State (23-3) | Arizona State (28-3) | Arizona State (30-4) | North Carolina (34-7) | Florida State (35-7) | Florida State (39-7) | Florida State (43-8) | Florida State (46-9) | Florida State (48-10) | North Carolina (54-14) | 3. |
| 4. | Rice (1) | Ole Miss (8-0) | Florida State (12-0) | North Carolina (14-3) | North Carolina (18-4) | North Carolina (21-5) | North Carolina (25-6) | North Carolina (29-7) | Arizona State (31-6) | Arizona State (35-7) | Arizona State (37-8) | Arizona State (40-9) | Arizona State (44-9) | Arizona State (45-11) | Miami (FL) (53-11) | 4. |
| 5. | Arizona (10) | South Carolina (5-1) | Miami (FL) (9-1) | Miami (FL) (13-2) | Long Beach State (16-3) | UC Irvine (19-3) | Wichita State (24-4) | UC Irvine (23-6) | Rice (31-10) | Texas A&M (37-7) | Texas A&M (40-8) | Rice (39-11) | Rice (42-11) | Rice (42-13) | Stanford (41-24) | 5. |
| 6. | Vanderbilt | Miami (FL) (5-1) | South Carolina (8-2) | Long Beach State (12-3) | Missouri (18-2) | South Carolina (18-7) | Nebraska (24-4) | Wichita State (27-5) | Texas A&M (33-7) | Rice (34-11) | Rice (34-11) | Nebraska (38-9) | Oklahoma State (40-15) | Oklahoma State (42-16) | LSU (49-19) | 6. |
| 7. | Texas | Rice (6-2) | Long Beach State (9-2) | UC Irvine (14-1) | UC Irvine (16-2) | Missouri (20-5) | UC Irvine (20-5) | Rice (27-10) | Wichita State (30-7) | Nebraska (32-8) | Nebraska (36-8) | Texas A&M (42-10) | Nebraska (39-12) | LSU (43-16) | Rice (47-15) | 7. |
| 8. | Ole Miss (1) | Florida State (7-0) | Ole Miss (10-3) | Vanderbilt (12-4) | Arizona (13-5) | Vanderbilt (18-6) | California (21-7) | Texas A&M (30-6) | Nebraska (28-7) | Wichita State (33-9) | Oklahoma State (35-12) | Georgia (33-17) | Cal State Fullerton (35-17) | Cal State Fullerton (37-19) | Florida State (54-14) | 8. |
| 9. | San Diego (1) | Long Beach State (5-2) | Baylor (10-1) | Missouri (13-2) | South Carolina (15-5) | Long Beach State (17-7) | Rice (23-10) | Nebraska (25-6) | South Carolina (29-11) | Oklahoma State (32-11) | Georgia (31-15) | Oklahoma State (37-14) | Georgia (35-19) | San Diego (41-15) | Arizona State (49-13) | 9. |
| 10. | Wichita State | Texas (6-2) | UC Irvine (10-1) | Ole Miss (13-5) | Texas (16-6) | Nebraska (21-4) | Texas (21-10) | South Carolina (25-10) | Missouri (28-10) | UC Irvine (28-10) | Wichita State (36-11) | San Diego (39-15) | Texas A&M (42-14) | Nebraska (40-14) | Cal State Fullerton (41-22) | 10. |
| 11. | Oregon State (4) | Vanderbilt (5-2) | Missouri (9-2) | Kentucky (18-0) | Wichita State (14-3) | Wichita State (20-3) | Texas A&M (26-6) | Missouri (25-9) | UC Irvine (24-9) | San Diego (35-11) | San Diego (37-13) | UC Irvine (33-13) | San Diego (39-15) | Georgia (35-21) | UC Irvine (42-18) | 11. |
| 12. | Florida State | UCLA (5-1) | Vanderbilt (8-3) | South Carolina (11-5) | Rice (17-6) | California (18-5) | Missouri (22-8) | California (23-9) | Georgia (27-12) | Stanford (25-13) | Stanford (27-15) | Cal State Fullerton (32-17) | UC Irvine (36-15) | UC Irvine (38-16) | Texas A&M (46-19) | 12. |
| 13. | Missouri | Missouri (6-2) | Texas (9-4) | Baylor (13-4) | Vanderbilt (14-6) | Florida (20-6) | Kentucky (25-5) | Georgia (23-12) | Vanderbilt (28-11) | Georgia (29-14) | UC Irvine (30-12) | Vanderbilt (37-15) | LSU (39-16) | Texas A&M (43-16) | Wichita State (48-17) | 13. |
| 14. | Miami (FL) | Virginia (10-0) | Virginia (11-2) | Texas (12-5) | Kentucky (20-2) | Texas (18-8) | South Carolina (20-10) | Vanderbilt (24-10) | Oklahoma State (27-11) | South Carolina (31-14) | Vanderbilt (34-13) | Coastal Carolina (41-11) | Wichita State (41-15) | Wichita State (44-15) | Arizona (42-19) | 14. |
| 15. | Cal State Fullerton | Baylor (7-0) | Kentucky (11-0) | Rice (12-6) | Virginia (19-4) | Virginia (23-5) | Stanford (15-9) | Texas (23-12) | California (26-10) | Coastal Carolina (36-9) | South Carolina (33-15) | Wichita State (38-14) | Missouri (37-17) | Coastal Carolina (47-12) | NC State (42-22) | 15. |
| 16. | Clemson | UC Irvine (7-0) | Rice (8-5) | Wichita State (11-3) | Ole Miss (15-8) | Rice (19-9) | Long Beach State (18-11) | Stanford (17-11) | Stanford (21-12) | Missouri (29-14) | Cal State Fullerton (29-16) | Stanford (29-18) | Coastal Carolina (43-11) | Missouri (38-19) | Coastal Carolina (50-14) | 16. |
| 17. | UCLA | Clemson (5-2) | Georgia Tech (12-1) | Texas A&M (15-4) | Nebraska (17-3) | Kentucky (22-4) | Vanderbilt (19-10) | Ole Miss (24-12) | San Diego (31-11) | Vanderbilt (31-13) | Missouri (31-16) | Michigan (38-11) | Stanford (31-19) | Michigan (45-12) | San Diego (44-17) | 17. |
| 18. | Michigan | Kentucky (9-0) | UCLA (7-4) | Stanford (8-4) | Florida (17-4) | Arizona (14-9) | Ole Miss (20-11) | Oklahoma State (23-10) | Coastal Carolina (33-7) | Cal State Fullerton (26-15) | Coastal Carolina (38-11) | South Carolina (34-18) | Michigan (42-12) | Stanford (33-21) | Oklahoma State (44-18) | 18. |
| 19. | Long Beach State | Wichita State (3-3) | Arkansas (11-1) | Virginia (14-4) | California (15-4) | Texas A&M (21-6) | Georgia Tech (25-7) | Virginia (29-9) | Cal State Fullerton (23-13) | Kentucky (33-11) | Michigan (34-11) | California (32-16) | California (32-17) | Long Beach State (37-19) | Missouri (39-21) | 19. |
| 20. | Virginia | Oregon State (3-3) | Stanford (8-4) | UCLA (10-5) | Coastal Carolina (18-4) | Stanford (12-7) | Cal State Fullerton (18-10) | Coastal Carolina (28-7) | Virginia (31-11) | NC State (30-13) | NC State (32-14) | Missouri (34-17) | Kentucky (41-15) | Texas (37-20) | Long Beach State (38-21) | 20. |
| 21. | Texas A&M | San Diego (5-4) | Wichita State (7-3) | Coastal Carolina (15-2) | Stanford (9-5) | Georgia Tech (22-5) | Florida (21-10) | San Diego (27-11) | Kentucky (30-9) | California (27-13) | California (29-15) | LSU (35-16) | Vanderbilt (37-18) | California (33-19) | Texas (39-22) | 21. |
| 22. | UC Irvine | Oklahoma State (7-1) | Texas A&M (11-3) | California (13-2) | Texas A&M (17-6) | Coastal Carolina (21-6) | Coastal Carolina (24-7) | Cal State Fullerton (20-12) | Ole Miss (25-15) | Michigan (30-10) | LSU (32-16) | NC State (35-16) | NC State (37-18) | Vanderbilt (40-20) | Michigan (46-14) | 22. |
| 23. | Mississippi State | Texas A&M (7-2) | Cal State Fullerton (8-4) | Georgia Tech (13-4) | San Diego (16-7) | Cal State Fullerton (15-9) | (20-10) | Kentucky (26-8) | Michigan (28-8) | Long Beach State (26-15) | Arizona (31-15) | Arizona (34-15) | South Carolina (37-19) | NC State (38-20) | Nebraska (41-16) | 23. |
| 24. | Baylor | Michigan (4-3) | Clemson (7-4) | Nebraska (14-2) | UCLA (10-8) | Ole Miss (16-11) | Virginia (24-8) | Florida (24-12) | Arizona (25-11) | Arizona (28-13) | East Carolina (36-13) | Kentucky (38-14) | Georgia Tech (38-17) | Arizona (38-17) | Georgia Tech (41-21) | 24. |
| 25. | Louisville | Stanford (6-2) | California (9-1) | Cal State Fullerton (9-7) | Cal State Fullerton (12-8) | San Diego (19-10) | Oklahoma State (20-9) | Long Beach State (19-14) | Long Beach State (23-14) | Ole Miss (28-17) | Kentucky (34-14) | Georgia Tech (36-15) | Arizona (35-16) | TCU (43-17) | Kentucky (44-19) | 25. |
| | Preseason Jan 21 | Week 2 Mar 3 | Week 3 Mar 10 | Week 4 Mar 17 | Week 5 Mar 24 | Week 6 Mar 31 | Week 7 Apr 7 | Week 8 Apr 14 | Week 9 Apr 21 | Week 10 Apr 28 | Week 11 May 5 | Week 12 May 12 | Week 13 May 19 | Week 14 May 26 | Final Jun 26 | |
| | | Dropped: 15 Cal State Fullerton; 23 Mississippi State; 25 Louisville | Dropped: 20 Oregon State; 21 San Diego; 22 Oklahoma State; 24 Michigan | Dropped: 19 Arkansas; 24 Clemson | Dropped: 13 Baylor; 23 Georgia Tech | Dropped: 24 UCLA | Dropped: 18 Arizona; 25 San Diego | Dropped: 19 Georgia Tech | Dropped: 15 Texas; 24 Florida | Dropped: 20 Virginia | Dropped: 23 Long Beach State; 25 Ole Miss | Dropped: 24 East Carolina | None | Dropped: 20 Kentucky; 23 South Carolina; 24 Georgia Tech | Dropped: 21 California; 22 Vanderbilt; 25 TCU | |

== Baseball America ==
| | Preseason Jan 22 | Week 1 Feb 25 | Week 2 Mar 3 | Week 3 Mar 10 | Week 4 Mar 17 | Week 5 Mar 24 | Week 6 Mar 31 | Week 7 Apr 7 | Week 8 Apr 14 | Week 9 Apr 21 | Week 10 Apr 28 | Week 11 May 5 | Week 12 May 12 | Week 13 May 19 | Week 14 May 26 | Week 15 June 3 | Week 16 June 10 | Final June 30 | |
|---|---|---|---|---|---|---|---|---|---|---|---|---|---|---|---|---|---|---|---|
| 1. | UCLA | Arizona (2–0) | Arizona (5–1) | Arizona (10–1) | Arizona State (17–0) | Arizona State (22–1) | Arizona State (25–1) | Miami (FL) (26–2) | Miami (FL) (30–3) | Miami (FL) (33–4) | Miami (FL) (36–5) | Miami (FL) (39–5) | Miami (FL) (41–6) | North Carolina (45–10) | Miami (FL) (47–8) | Miami (FL) (50–8) | Miami (FL) (52–9) | Fresno State (47–31) | 1. |
| 2. | Arizona | Ole Miss (3–0) | Ole Miss (8–0) | Arizona State (12–0) | Arizona (12–2) | Missouri (18–2) | Miami (FL) 21–2) | Arizona State (28–3) | Arizona State (30–4) | North Carolina (34–7) | North Carolina (38–8) | North Carolina (38–8) | North Carolina (42–9) | Arizona State (44–9) | Florida State (48–10) | Florida State (52–11) | Florida State (54–12) | Georgia (45–25) | 2. |
| 3. | Vanderbilt | UCLA (1–1) | UCLA (5–1) | North Carolina (10–2) | North Carolina (14–3) | North Carolina (18–4) | North Carolina (21–5) | Florida State (28–3) | Florida State (31–3) | Florida State (34–5) | Stanford (25–13) | Arizona State (37–8) | Arizona State (40–9) | Miami (FL) (43–8) | North Carolina (46–12) | North Carolina (49–12) | North Carolina (52–12) | North Carolina (54–14) | 3. |
| 4. | Ole Miss | North Carolina (3–0) | Arizona State (7–0) | Missouri (9–2) | Missouri (13–2) | Miami (FL) (17–2) | Missouri (20–5) | North Carolina (25–6) | North Carolina (29–7) | Missouri (28–10) | Arizona State (35–7) | Florida State (39–7) | Florida State (43–8) | Florida State (46–9) | Arizona State (45–11) | Arizona State (48–11) | LSU (48–17) | Miami (FL) (53–11) | 4. |
| 5. | North Carolina | Missouri (3–0) | North Carolina (7–1) | Ole Miss (10–3) | Vanderbilt (12–4) | Long Beach State (16–3) | UC Irvine (19–3) | California (21–7) | UC Irvine (23–6) | Stanford (21–12) | Florida State (35–7) | Nebraska (36–8) | Nebraska (38–9) | Rice (42–11) | LSU (43–16) | LSU (46–16) | Rice (47–13) | Stanford (41–24) | 5. |
| 6. | Missouri | Arizona State (3–0) | Missouri (6–2) | Vanderbilt (8–3) | Miami (FL) (13–2) | Arizona (13–5) | Florida State (23–3) | Nebraska (24–4) | Missouri (25–9) | Arizona State (31–6) | Nebraska (32–8) | Stanford (27–5) | Rice (39–11) | Cal State Fullerton (35–17) | Oklahoma (42–16) | Cal State Fullerton (41–20) | Stanford (39–22) | LSU (49–19) | 6. |
| 7. | Oregon State | Vanderbilt (2–1) | Vanderbilt (5–2) | Miami (FL) (9–1) | Long Beach State (12–3) | UC Irvine (16–2) | California (18–5) | UC Irvine (20–5) | Wichita State (27–5) | California (26–10) | Rice (34–11) | Rice (34–11) | Georgia (33–17) | Oklahoma State (40–15) | San Diego (41–15) | Rice (45–13) | Georgia (41–23) | Florida State (54–14) | 7. |
| 8. | Michigan | Michigan (3–0) | Miami (FL) (5–1) | South Carolina (8–2) | Ole Miss (13–5) | Florida State (19–2) | Vanderbilt (18–6) | Missouri (22–8) | California (23–9) | Nebraska (28–7) | San Diego (35–11) | San Diego (37–13) | Cal State Fullerton (32–7) | Georgia (35–19) | Cal State Fullerton (37–19) | UC Irvine (41–16) | Fresno State (42–29) | Rice (47–15) | 8. |
| 9. | Arizona State | Miami (FL) 3–0) | South Carolina (5–1) | Long Beach State (9–2) | UC Irvine (14–1) | Vanderbilt (14–6) | South Carolina (18–7) | Wichita State (24–4) | Nebraska (25–6) | Rice (31–10) | Oklahoma State (32–11) | Texas A&M (40–8) | Texas A&M (42–10) | Missouri (37–17) | Rice (42–13) | Georgia (39–22) | Arizona State (49–13) | Arizona state (49–13) | 9. |
| 10. | Miami (FL) | South Carolina (2–1) | Long Beach State (5–2) | Baylor (10–1) | Florida State (16–1) | South Carolina (15–5) | Long Beach State (17–7) | Stanford (15–9) | Stanford (17–11) | Georgia (27–12) | Texas A&M (37–7) | Oklahoma State (35–12) | Oklahoma State (35–12) | LSU (39–16) | Georgia (35–21) | Texas A&M (46–17) | Cal State Fullerton (41–22) | Cal State Fullerton (41–22) | 10. |
| 11. | San Diego | Long Beach State (2–1) | Baylor (7–0) | UCLA (7–4) | UCLA (10–5) | California (15–4) | Nebraska (21–4) | Rice (23–10) | Rice (27–10) | San Diego (31–11) | Georgia (29–14) | Georgia (31–15) | San Diego (39–15) | San Diego (39–15) | UC Irvine (38–16) | Stanford (37–22) | UC Irvine (42–18) | UC Irvine (42–18) | 11. |
| 12. | South Carolina | Oregon State (1–2) | Oregon State (3–3) | California (9–1) | California (13–2) | Rice (17–6) | Wichita State (20–3) | Texas (21–10) | San Diego (27–11) | South Carolina (29–11) | Cal State Fullerton (26–15) | Cal State Fullerton (29–16) | UC Irvine (33–13) | Nebraska (39–12) | Missouri (38–19) | Coastal Carolina (50–12) | Texas A&M (46–19) | Texas A&M (46–19) | 12. |
| 13. | Long Beach State | Baylor (3–0) | Rice (6–2) | UC Irvine (10–1) | South Carolina (11–5) | Texas (16–6) | Stanford (12–7) | San Diego (22–11) | Georgia (23–12) | Oklahoma State (27–11) | UC Irvine (28–10) | UC Irvine (30–12) | California (32–16) | Texas A&M (42–14) | Nebraska (40–14) | Wichita State (47–15) | Wichita State (48–17) | Wichita State (48–17) | 13. |
| 14. | Rice | Texas (3–0) | Virginia (10–0) | Florida State (12–0) | Baylor (13–4) | San Diego (16–7) | Virginia (23–5) | Georgia (20–10) | South Carolina (25–10) | Wichita State (30–7) | Wichita State (33–9) | Wichita State (36–11) | Stanford (29–18) | UC Irvine (36–15) | Texas A&M (43–16) | Arizona (41–17) | Arizona (42–19) | Arizona (42–19) | 14. |
| 15. | Baylor | Rice (1–2) | Michigan (4–3) | Rice (8–5) | Rice (12–6) | Ole Miss (15–8) | Rice (19–9) | South Carolina (20–10) | Cal State Fullerton (20–12) | Cal State Fullerton (23–13) | Missouri (29–14) | Missouri (31–16) | Missouri (34–17) | California (32–17) | Stanford (33–21) | NC State (41–20) | NC State (42–22) | NC State (42–22) | 15. |
| 16. | Texas | Virginia (4–0) | Texas (6–2) | Virginia (11–2) | Kentucky (18–0) | Wichita State (14–3) | Texas (18–8) | Cal State Fullerton (18–10) | Ole Miss (24–12) | UC Irvine (24–9) | California (27–13) | California (29–15) | LSU (35–16) | Stanford (31–19) | Michigan (45–12) | Oklahoma State (44–18) | Coastal Carolina (50–14) | Coastal Carolina (50–14) | 16. |
| 17. | Virginia | San Diego (1–2) | San Diego (5–4) | Kentucky (11–0) | Stanford (8–4) | Stanford (9–5) | San Diego (19–10) | Kentucky (25–5) | Vanderbilt (24–10) | Vanderbilt (28–11) | South Carolina (31–14) | South Carolina (33–15) | Michigan (38–11) | Michigan (42–12) | Coastal Carolina (47–12) | Fresno State (40–28) | Oklahoma State (44–18) | Oklahoma State (44–18) | 17. |
| 18. | Fresno State | Tulane (3–0) | California (5–1) | Stanford (8–4) | Texas (12–5) | Kentucky (20–2) | Arizona (14–9) | Ole Miss (20–11) | Oklahoma State (23–10) | Texas A&M (33–7) | Kentucky (33–11) | Vanderbilt (34–13) | St. John's (39–11) | St. John's (41–12) | TCU (44–17) | San Diego (44–17) | San Diego (44–17) | San Diego (44–17) | 18. |
| 19. | Louisiana–Lafayette | Clemson (3–0) | UC Irvine (7–0) | Texas (9–4) | San Diego (12–7) | Nebraska (17–3) | Florida (20–6) | Vanderbilt (19–10) | Texas A&M (30–6) | Michigan (28–8) | NC State (30–13) | NC State (32–14) | Vanderbilt (37–15) | Kentucky (41–15) | Texas (37–20) | Missouri (39–21) | Missouri (39–21) | Missouri (39–21) | 19. |
| 20. | Wichita State | Wichita State (1–0) | Florida State (7–0) | Cal State Fullerton (8–4) | Wichita State (11–3) | Baylor (13–7) | UNC Wilmington (21–4) | Long Beach State (18–11) | Texas (23–120 | Coastal Carolina (33–7) | Coastal Carolina (36–9) | Michigan (34–11) | NC State (35–16) | NC State (37–18) | California (33–19) | Nebraska (41–16) | Nebraska (41–16) | Nebraska (41–16) | 20. |
| 21. | Texas A&M | Oklahoma State (4–0) | Oklahoma State (7–1) | San Diego (7–7) | Coastal Carolina (15–2) | Virginia (19–4) | Kentucky (22–4) | Oklahoma State (20–9) | Michigan (22–8) | Ole Miss (25–15) | Michigan (30–10) | St. John's (35–10) | Kentucky (38–14) | TCU (40–16) | Wichita State (44–15) | Texas (39–22) | Texas (39–22) | Texas (39–22) | 21. |
| 22. | Tulane | San Diego State (2–1) | Tulane (6–2) | Oregon State (5–5) | Nebraska (14–2) | Coastal Carolina (18–4) | Michigan (14–6) | UNC Wilmington (23–5) | Coastal Carolina (28–7) | Kentucky (30–9) | Vanderbilt (31–13) | LSU (32–16) | Wichita State (38–14) | Coastal Carolina (43–11) | Long Beach State (37–19) | Michigan (46–14) | Michigan (46–14) | Michigan (46–14) | 22. |
| 23. | Clemson | Cal State Fullerton (2–1) | Clemson (5–2) | Oklahoma State (9–3) | East Carolina (13–4) | UCLA (10–8) | UCLA (12–10) | Michigan (17–8) | Pepperdine (23–11) | Arizona (25–11) | Oregon State (20–14) | Kentucky (34–13) | Coastal Carolina (41–11) | Wichita State (41–15) | Arizona (38–17) | TCU (45–19) | TCU (45–19) | TCU (45–19) | 23. |
| 24. | East Carolina | Fresno State (2–2) | Kentucky (9–0) | Wichita State (7–3) | Virginia (14–4) | Florida (17–4) | Coastal Carolina (21–6) | Coastal Carolina (24–7) | East Carolina (26–9) | NC State (27–12) | St. John's (31–10) | Coastal Carolina (38–11) | TCU (35–16) | Texas (34–19) | Kentucky (42–17) | Kentucky (44–19) | Kentucky (44–19) | Kentucky (44–19) | 24. |
| 25. | Old Dominion | Louisiana–Lafayette (2–2) | Wichita State (3–3) | Michigan (5–5) | Michigan (8–6) | Michigan (9–6) | Cal State Fullerton (15–9) | Florida (21–10) | Kentucky (26–8) | Long Beach State (23–14) | Long Beach State (26–15) | TCU (33–16) | Tulane (36–15) | Long Beach State (34–18) | NC State (38–20) | Long Beach State (38–21) | Long Beach State (38–21) | Long Beach State (38–21) | 25. |
| | Preseason Jan 22 | Week 1 Feb 25 | Week 2 Mar 3 | Week 3 Mar 10 | Week 4 Mar 17 | Week 5 Mar 24 | Week 6 Mar 31 | Week 7 Apr 7 | Week 8 Apr 14 | Week 9 Apr 21 | Week 10 Apr 28 | Week 11 May 5 | Week 12 May 12 | Week 13 May 19 | Week 14 May 26 | Week 15 June 3 | Week 16 June 10 | Final June 30 | |
| | | Dropped: 21 Texas A&M; 24 East Carolina; 25 Old Dominion | Dropped: 22 San Diego State; 23 Cal State Fullerton; 24 Fresno State; 25 Louisiana–Lafayette | Dropped: 22 Tulane; 23 Clemson | Dropped: 20 Cal State Fullerton; 22 Oregon State; 23 Oklahoma State | Dropped: 23 East Carolina | Dropped: 15 Ole Miss; 20 Baylor | Dropped: 14 Virginia; 18 Arizona; 23 UCLA | Dropped: 20 Long Beach State; 22 UNC Wilmington; 25 Florida | Dropped: 20 Texas; 23 Pepperdine; 24 East Carolina | Dropped: 21 Ole Miss; 23 Arizona | Dropped: 23 Oregon State; 25 Long Beach State | Dropped: 17 South Carolina | Dropped: 19 Vanderbilt; 25 Tulane | Dropped: 18 St. John's | Dropped: 20 California | None | None | |

== Collegiate Baseball ==
| | Preseason Dec 21 | Week 1 Feb 25 | Week 2 Mar 3 | Week 3 Mar 10 | Week 4 Mar 17 | Week 5 Mar 24 | Week 6 Mar 31 | Week 7 Apr 7 | Week 8 Apr 14 | Week 9 Apr 21 | Week 10 Apr 28 | Week 11 May 5 | Week 12 May 12 | Week 13 May 19 | Week 14 May 26 | Week 15 June 3 | Week 16 June 10 | Final June 27 | |
|---|---|---|---|---|---|---|---|---|---|---|---|---|---|---|---|---|---|---|---|
| 1. | Arizona | Arizona State (3–0) | Arizona State (7–0) | Arizona State (12–0) | Arizona State (17–0) | Arizona State (22–1) | Arizona State (25–1) | Florida State (28–3) | Florida State (31–3) | Miami (FL) (33–4) | Miami (FL) (36–5) | Miami (FL) (39–5) | Miami (FL) (41–6) | North Carolina (45–10) | Miami (FL) (47–8) | Miami (FL) (50–8) | Miami (FL) (52–9) | Fresno State (47–31) | 1. |
| 2. | South Carolina | Arizona (2–1) | Arizona (5–1) | Arizona (10–1) | Kentucky (18–0) | Florida State (19–2) | Florida State (23–3) | Miami (FL) (26–2) | Miami (FL) (30–3) | Florida State (34–5) | North Carolina (38–8) | North Carolina (38–8) | North Carolina (42–9) | Miami (FL) (43–8) | LSU (43–16–1) | LSU (46–16–1) | LSU (48–17–1) | Georgia (45–25–1) | 2. |
| 3. | Arizona State | South Carolina (2–1) | South Carolina (5–1) | Florida State (12–0) | Florida State (16–1) | UC Irvine (16–2) | Miami (FL) (21–2) | Arizona State (28–3) | Arizona State (30–4) | North Carolina (34–7) | Arizona State (35–7) | Arizona State (37–8) | Arizona State (40–9) | Arizona State (44–9) | Florida State (48–10) | Florida State (52–11) | Florida State (54–12) | North Carolina (54–14) | 3. |
| 4. | Ole Miss | Ole Miss (3–0) | Ole Miss (8–0) | Kentucky (11–0) | Arizona (12–2) | Long Beach State (16–3) | UC Irvine (19–3) | North Carolina (25–6) | North Carolina (29–7) | Arizona State (31–6) | Florida State (35–7) | Florida State (39–7) | Florida State (43–8) | Florida State (46–9) | North Carolina (46–12) | North Carolina (48–12) | North Carolina (51–12) | Stanford (41–24–2) | 4. |
| 5. | North Carolina | North Carolina (3–0) | North Carolina (7–1) | South Carolina (8–2) | UC Irvine (14–1) | Missouri (18–2) | North Carolina (21–5) | Wichita State (24–4) | Wichita State (27–5) | Georgia (27–12–1) | Rice (34–11) | Rice (34–11) | Rice (39–11) | Rice (42–11) | Arizona State (45–11) | Arizona State (48–11) | Rice (47–13) | Miami (FL) (53–11) | 5. |
| 6. | Rice | Texas (3–0) | Rice (6–2) | North Carolina (10–2) | North Carolina (14–3) | Miami (FL) (17–2) | South Carolina (18–7) | Nebraska (24–4–1) | UC Irvine (27–5) | Rice (31–10) | Texas A&M (37–7) | Texas A&M (40–8) | Nebraska (38–9–1) | Georgia (35–19–1) | San Diego (41–15) | Rice (45–13) | Georgia (41–23–1) | LSU (49–19–1) | 6. |
| 7. | San Diego | Wichita State (1–0) | Texas (6–2) | Long Beach State (9–2) | Long Beach State (12–3) | North Carolina (18–4) | California (18–5–1) | California (21–7–1) | Georgia (23–12) | Wichita State (30–7) | San Diego (35–11) | Nebraska (36–8–1) | Texas A&M (42–10) | San Diego (39–15) | Rice (42–13) | Georgia (39–22–1) | Stanford (39–22–2) | Florida State (54–14) | 7. |
| 8. | Texas | Michigan (3–0) | Florida State (7–0) | UC Irvine (10–1) | Missouri (13–2) | Kentucky (20–2) | Wichita State (20–3) | UC Irvine (20–5) | Texas A&M (30–6) | Texas A&M (33–7) | Georgia ((29–14–1) | Georgia (31–15–1) | Georgia (33–17–1) | LSU (39–16–1) | Georgia (35–21–1) | Texas A&M (46–17)) | Fresno State (42–29) | Rice (47–15) | 8. |
| 9. | Wichita State | Vanderbilt (2–1) | Kentucky (9–0) | Baylor (10–1) | Vanderbilt (12–4) | Arizona (13–5) | Nebraska (21–4–1) | Kentucky (25–5) | Rice (27–10) | San Diego (31–11) | Wichita State (33–9) | San Diego (37–13) | San Diego (39–15) | Texas A&M (42–14) | Texas A&M (43–16) | Cal State Fullerton (41–20) | Arizona State (49–13) | Arizona State (49–13) | 9. |
| 10. | Michigan | Long Beach State (2–1) | Vanderbilt (5–2) | Miami (FL) (9–1) | Miami (FL) (13–2) | South Carolina (15–5) | Kentucky (22–3) | Georgia Tech (25–7) | Nebraska (25–6–1) | Nebraska (28–7–1) | Nebraska (32–8–1) | Oklahoma State (35–12) | Oklahoma State (37–14) | Oklahoma State (40–15) | Oklahoma State (42–16) | Stanford (37–22–2) | Texas A&M (46–19) | Texas A&M (46–19) | 10. |
| 11. | Vanderbilt | Rice (1–2) | Long Beach State (5–2) | Georgia Tech (12–1) | South Carolina (11–5) | California (15–4–1) | Long Beach State (17–7) | Georgia (20–10) | Missouri (25–9) | Missouri (28–10) | Stanford (25–13–2) | Stanford (27–15–2) | Cal State Fullerton (32–17) | Cal State Fullerton (35–17) | Long Beach State (37–19) | Wichita State (47–15) | Cal State Fullerton (41–22) | Cal State Fullerton (41–22) | 11. |
| 12. | Florida State | Florida State (3–0) | Virginia (10–0) | Vanderbilt (8–3) | California (13–2–1) | Texas (16–6) | Missouri (20–5) | Texas A&M (26–6) | South Carolina (25–10) | South Carolina (29–11) | Oklahoma State (32–11) | Cal State Fullerton (29–16) | Missouri (34–17) | Missouri (37–17) | Cal State Fullerton (37–19) | Coastal Carolina (50–12) | Wichita State (48–17) | Wichita State (48–17) | 12. |
| 13. | Clemson | Clemson (3–0) | UC Irvine (7–0) | Ole Miss (10–3) | Texas (12–5) | Rice (17–6) | Vanderbilt (18–6) | Rice (23–10) | San Diego (27–11) | Stanford (21–12–2) | Cal State Fullerton (26–15) | South Carolina (33–15) | California (32–16–2) | Nebraska (39–12–1) | Michigan (45–12) | UC Irvine (41–16) | Arizona (42–19) | Arizona (42–19) | 13. |
| 14. | Miami (FL) | Miami (FL) (3–0) | Baylor (7–0) | Rice (8–5) | Rice (12–6) | Vanderbilt (14–6) | Georgia Tech (22–5) | Texas (21–10) | Stanford (17–11–1) | California (26–10–2) | Missouri (29–14) | Missouri (31–16) | Stanford (29–18–2) | Michigan (42–12) | Missouri (38–19) | Arizona (41–17) | UC Irvine (42–18) | UC Irvine (42–18) | 14. |
| 15. | Missouri | Missouri (3–0) | UCLA (5–1) | Texas (9–4) | Baylor (13–4) | Nebraska (17–3–1) | Texas (18–8) | South Carolina (20–10) | California (23–9–2) | Cal State Fullerton (23–13) | South Carolina (31–14) | Wichita State (36–11) | Michigan (38–11) | California (32–17–2) | Nebraska (40–14–1) | NC State (41–20) | NC State (42–22) | NC State (42–22) | 15. |
| 16. | Cal State Fullerton | Cal State Fullerton (2–1) | Miami (FL) (5–1) | Virginia (11–2) | UCF (16–1) | Wichita State (14–3) | Virginia (23–5) | Missouri (22–8) | Texas (23–12) | Virginia (31–11) | California (27–13–2) | Vanderbilt (34–13) | LSU (35–16–1) | Stanford (31–19–2) | Stanford (33–21–2) | Fresno State (40–28) | Coastal Carolina (50–14) | Coastal Carolina (50–14) | 16. |
| 17. | Long Beach State | Kentucky (3–0) | Clemson (5–2) | Missouri (9–2) | Georgia Tech (13–4) | Georgia Tech (17–5) | Florida (20–6) | Stanford (15–9) | Virginia (29–9) | UC Irvine (24–9) | UC Irvine (28–10) | NC State (32–14) | Vanderbilt (37–15) | Florida (34–20) | California (33–19–2) | San Diego (44–17) | San Diego (44–17) | San Diego (44–17) | 17. |
| 18. | UCLA | San Diego (1–2) | Missouri (6–2) | California (9–1–1) | Ole Miss (13–5) | Virginia (19–4) | Charlotte (21–3) | Cal State Fullerton (18–10) | Cal State Fullerton (20–12) | Oklahoma State (27–11) | NC State (30–13) | California (29–15–2) | South Carolina (34–18) | Long Beach State (34–18) | Wichita State (44–15) | Oklahoma State (44–18) | Oklahoma State (44–18) | Oklahoma State (44–18) | 18. |
| 19. | Oregon State | UCLA (1–1) | Georgia Tech (7–1) | Stanford (8–4) | Stanford (8–4) | UCF (20–3) | UNC Wilmington (21–4) | Houston (19–10) | Houston (22–12) | Michigan (28–8) | Kentucky (33–11) | Michigan (34–11) | Wichita State (38–14) | South Carolina (37–19) | Texas (37–20) | Long Beach State (38–21) | Long Beach State (38–21) | Long Beach State (38–21) | 19. |
| 20. | Kentucky | Oregon State (1–2) | Oklahoma State (7–1) | UCF (11–1) | UCLA (10–5) | Baylor (13–7) | Southern Miss (17–8) | San Diego (22–11) | Ole Miss (24–12) | Vanderbilt (28–11) | Vanderbilt (31–13) | St. John's (35–10) | St. John's (39–11) | Wichita State (41–15) | TCU (43–17) | Michigan (46–14) | Michigan (46–14) | Michigan (46–14) | 20. |
| 21. | Fresno State | Virginia (4–0) | Texas A&M (7–2) | Arkansas (11–1) | Virginia (14–4) | Stanford (9–5) | Rice (19–9) | Long Beach State (18–11) | Georgia Tech (26–10) | Coastal Carolina (33–7) | Michigan (30–10) | East Carolina (36–13) | NC State (35–16) | St. John's (41–12) | Coastal Carolina (47–12) | Missouri (39–21) | Missouri (39–21) | Missouri (39–21) | 21. |
| 22. | Texas A&M | Georgia Tech (3–0) | Oregon State (3–3) | Cal State Fullerton (8–4) | Nebraska (14–2) | Florida (17–4) | St. John's (19–5) | St. John's (22–6) | Vanderbilt (24–10) | NC State (27–12) | Florida (27–16) | Florida (28–18) | New Orleans (38–13) | NC State (37–18) | UC Irvine (38–16) | Nebraska (41–16–1) | Nebraska (41–16–1) | Nebraska (41–16–1) | 22. |
| 23. | Louisville | UC Irvine (2–0) | Wichita State (3–3) | UCLA (7–4) | Texas A&M (15–4) | Charlotte (17–2) | Texas A&M (21–6) | Vanderbilt (19–10) | Kentucky (26–8) | Kentucky (30–9) | Virginia (32–15) | LSU (32–16–1) | Kentucky (38–14) | Kentucky (41–15) | Arizona (38–17) | California (33–21–2) | California (33–21–2) | California (33–21–2) | 23. |
| 24. | Virginia | Baylor (3–0) | Oral Roberts (7–0) | Texas A&M (11–3) | Wichita State (11–3) | Ole Miss (15–8) | East Carolina (18–7) | Florida (21–10) | East Carolina (26–9) | Notre Dame (25–10–1) | Coastal Carolina (36–9) | Virginia (33–15) | Tulane (36–15–1) | Texas (34–19) | Vanderbilt (40–20) | Georgia Tech (41–21) | Georgia Tech (41–21) | Georgia Tech (41–21) | 24. |
| 25. | Georgia Tech | Oklahoma State (4–0) | UCF (7–0) | Oklahoma (12–2) | Washington State (13–5) | St. John's (16–4) | UCF (22–6) | Virginia (24–9) | Oklahoma State (23–10) | Arizona (25–11) | Oregon State (20–14) | Georgia Tech (33–14) | Georgia Tech (36–15) | UC Irvine (36–15) | NC State (38–20) | Texas (39–22) | Texas (39–22) | Texas (39–22) | 25. |
| 26. | UC Irvine | San Diego State (2–1) | California (5–1–1) | Clemson (7–4) | East Carolina (13–4) | Texas A&M (17–6) | Michigan (14–6) | Charlotte (23–5) | Michigan (22–8) | Oregon State (18–13) | Georgia Tech (31–13) | Coastal Carolina (38–11) | Coastal Carolina (41–11) | TCU (39–16) | South Carolina (38–21) | TCU (44–18) | TCU (44–18) | TCU (44–18) | 26. |
| 27. | Mississippi State | Louisville (2–1) | Michigan (4–3) | Wichita State (7–3) | Coastal Carolina (15–2) | San Diego (16–7) | Georgia (15–10) | UNC Wilmington (23–5–1) | Coastal Carolina (28–7) | Georgia Tech (28–12) | Tulane (29–13–1) | UC Irvine (30–12) | UC Irvine (33–13) | Coastal Carolina (43–11) | Florida (34–22) | Vanderbilt (41–22) | Vanderbilt (41–22) | Vanderbilt (41–22) | 27. |
| 28. | Baylor | Texas A&M (2–2) | Arkansas (6–1) | Oklahoma State (9–3) | Cal State Fullerton (9–7) | Washington State (14–7) | Stanford (12–7) | East Carolina (21–9) | NC State (23–11) | Houston (25–14) | Southern Miss (31–13) | Tulane (32–14–1) | Virginia (34–17) | Georgia Tech (38–17) | St. John's (41–14) | South Carolina (40–23) | South Carolina (40–23) | South Carolina (40–23) | 28. |
| 29. | Pepperdine | Pepperdine (2–1) | Pepperdine (5–2) | Pepperdine (10–3) | Florida (14–3) | Coastal Carolina (18–4) | Cal State Fullerton (15–9) | Southern Miss (20–10) | Notre Dame (21–9–1) | Ole Miss (25–15) | Long Beach State (26–15) | New Orleans (34–13) | Southern Miss (37–15) | Alabama (32–24) | Kentucky (42–17) | St. John's (42–16) | St. John's (42–16) | St. John's (42–16) | 29. |
| 30. | LSU | Arkansas (3–0) | Stanford (6–2) | Coastal Carolina (12–1) | Tennessee (12–4) | Cal State Fullerton (12–8) | Coastal Carolina (21–6) | Ole Miss (20–11) | Tennessee (22–13) | UNC Wilmington (29–8–1) | UNC Wilmington (33–9–1) | Washington (28–16) | Washington (31–17) | UNC Wilmington (41–13–1) | Virginia (38–21) | Kentucky (44–19) | Kentucky (44–19) | Kentucky (44–19) | 30. |
| | Preseason Dec 21 | Week 1 Feb 25 | Week 2 Mar 3 | Week 3 Mar 10 | Week 4 Mar 17 | Week 5 Mar 24 | Week 6 Mar 31 | Week 7 Apr 7 | Week 8 Apr 14 | Week 9 Apr 21 | Week 10 Apr 28 | Week 11 May 5 | Week 12 May 12 | Week 13 May 19 | Week 14 May 26 | Week 15 June 3 | Week 16 June 10 | Final June 27 | |
| | | Dropped: 21 Fresno State; 27 Mississippi State; 30 LSU | Dropped: 16 Cal State Fullerton; 18 San Diego; 26 San Diego State; 27 Louisville | Dropped: 22 Oregon State; 24 Oral Roberts; 27 Michigan | Dropped: 21 Arkansas; 25 Oklahoma; 26 Clemson; 28 Oklahoma State; 29 Pepperdine | Dropped: 20 UCLA; 26 East Carolina; 30 Tennessee | Dropped: 9 Arizona; 20 Baylor; 24 Ole Miss; 27 San Diego; 28 Washington State | Dropped: 25 UCF; 26 Michigan; 30 Coastal Carolina | Dropped: 21 Long Beach State; 22 St. John's; 24 Florida; 26 Charlotte; 27 UNC Wilmington; 29 Southern Miss | Dropped: 16 Texas; 24 East Carolina; 30 Tennessee | Dropped: 24 Notre Dame; 25 Arizona; 28 Houston; 29 Ole Miss | Dropped: 19 Kentucky; 25 Oregon State; 28 Southern Miss; 29 Long Beach State; 30 UNC Wilmington | Dropped: 21 East Carolina; 22 Florida | Dropped: 17 Vanderbilt; 22 New Orleans; 24 Tulane; 28 Virginia; 29 Southern Miss; 30 Washington | Dropped: 28 Georgia Tech; 29 Alabama; 30 UNC Wilmington | Dropped: 27 Florida; 30 Virginia | None | None | |

The preseason poll ranked the top 40 teams. Remaining teams not listed above were: 31. Oklahoma State 32. Louisiana–Lafayette 33. Southern Illinois 34. Southern Miss 35. UC Riverside 36. Stetson 37. Coastal Carolina 38. Nebraska 39. California 40. Oral Roberts

== NCBWA ==
| | Preseason Jan 17 | Week 1 Feb 25 | Week 2 Mar 3 | Week 3 Mar 10 | Week 4 Mar 17 | Week 5 Mar 24 | Week 6 Mar 31 | Week 7 Apr 7 | Week 8 Apr 14 | Week 9 Apr 21 | Week 10 Apr 28 | Week 11 May 5 | Week 12 May 12 | Week 13 May 19 | Week 14 May 26 | Week 15 June 3 | Week 16 June 10 | Final June 25 | |
|---|---|---|---|---|---|---|---|---|---|---|---|---|---|---|---|---|---|---|---|
| 1. | Arizona State | Arizona State (3–0) | Arizona State (7–0) | Arizona State (12–0) | Arizona State (17–0) | Arizona State (22–1) | Arizona State (25–1) | Miami (FL) (26–2) | Miami (FL) (30–3) | Miami (FL) (33–4) | Miami (FL) (36–5) | Miami (FL) (39–5) | Miami (FL) (41–6) | North Carolina (45–10) | Miami (FL) (47–8) | Miami (FL) (50–8) | Miami (FL) (52–9) | Fresno State (47–31) | 1. |
| 2. | North Carolina | North Carolina (3–0) | Ole Miss (8–0) | Arizona (10–1) | Arizona (12–2) | Miami (FL) (17–2) | Miami (FL) (25–1) | Florida State (28–3) | Florida State (31–3) | Florida State (34–5) | North Carolina (38–8) | North Carolina (38–8) | North Carolina (42–9) | Miami (FL) (43–8) | Florida State (48–10) | North Carolina (49–12) | North Carolina (51–12) | Georgia (45–25–1) | 2. |
| 3. | Rice | Texas (3–0) | North Carolina (7–1) | North Carolina (10–2) | North Carolina (14–3) | North Carolina (18–4) | Florida State (23–3) | Arizona State (28–3) | Arizona State (30–4) | North Carolina (34–7) | Florida State (35–7) | Florida State (39–7) | Florida State (43–8) | Arizona State (44–9) | North Carolina (46–12) | Florida State (52–11) | Florida State (54–12) | North Carolina (54–14) | 3. |
| 4. | South Carolina | Ole Miss (3–0) | South Carolina (5–1) | South Carolina (8–2) | Miami (FL) (13–2) | Florida State (19–2) | North Carolina (21–5) | North Carolina (25–6) | North Carolina (29–7) | Rice (31–10) | Arizona State (35–7) | Arizona State (37–8) | Arizona State (40–9) | Florida State (46–9) | Arizona State (45–11) | Arizona State (48–11) | Rice (47–13) | Stanford (41–24–2) | 4. |
| 5. | Arizona | South Carolina (2–1) | Arizona (5–1) | Miami (FL) (9–1) | Florida State (16–1) | Long Beach State (16–3) | UC Irvine (19–3) | Wichita State (24–4) | UC Irvine (23–6) | Arizona State (31–6) | Rice (34–11) | Rice (34–11) | Rice (39–11) | Rice (42–11) | Oklahoma State (42–16) | Rice (45–13) | LSU (48–17–1) | Miami (FL) (53–11) | 5. |
| 6. | Texas | Arizona (2–1) | Rice (6–2) | Florida State (12–0) | Vanderbilt (12–4) | Arizona (13–5) | Vanderbilt (18–6) | UC Irvine (20–5) | Wichita State (27–5) | Texas A&M (33–7) | Texas A&M (37–7) | Texas A&M (40–8) | Nebraska (38–9–1) | Oklahoma State (40–15) | Cal State Fullerton (37–19) | Cal State Fullerton (41–20) | Georgia (41–23–1) | LSU (49–19–1) | 6. |
| 7. | Ole Miss | Vanderbilt (2–1) | Texas (6–2) | Long Beach State (9–2) | Long Beach State (12–3) | South Carolina (15–5) | South Carolina (18–7) | Rice (23–10) | Rice (27–10) | South Carolina (29–11) | UC Irvine (28–10) | Nebraska (36–8–1) | Texas A&M (42–10) | Cal State Fullerton (35–17) | San Diego (41–15) | LSU (46–16–1) | Stanford (39–22–2) | Rice (47–15) | 7. |
| 8. | Vanderbilt | Miami (FL) (3–0) | Miami (FL) (5–1) | Ole Miss (10–3) | South Carolina (11–5) | Missouri (18–2) | Wichita State (20–3) | Texas A&M (26–6) | Texas A&M (30–6) | Wichita State (30–7) | San Diego (35–11) | Oklahoma State (35–12) | Oklahoma State (37–14) | San Diego (39–15) | Rice (42–13) | UC Irvine (41–16) | Fresno State (42–29) | Florida State (54–14) | 8. |
| 9. | San Diego | Rice (1–2) | Florida State (7–0) | Vanderbilt (8–3) | UC Irvine (14–1) | UC Irvine (16–2) | Long Beach State (17–7) | Kentucky (25–5) | South Carolina (25–10) | Missouri (28–10) | Nebraska (32–8–1) | San Diego (37–13) | UC Irvine (33–13) | UC Irvine (36–15) | UC Irvine (38–16) | Coastal Carolina (50–12) | Arizona State (49–13) | Arizona State (49–13) | 9. |
| 10. | Wichita State | Wichita State (1–0) | Vanderbilt (5–2) | Texas (9–4) | Texas (12–5) | Texas (16–6) | Missouri (20–5) | South Carolina (20–10) | Missouri (25–9) | Vanderbilt (28–11) | Oklahoma State (32–11) | UC Irvine (30–12) | San Diego (39–15) | Nebraska (39–12–1) | Coastal Carolina (47–12) | Arizona (41–17) | UC Irvine (42–18) | UC Irvine (42–18) | 10. |
| 11. | Oregon State | FLorida State (3–0) | Long Beach State (5–2) | UC Irvine (10–1) | Missouri (13–2) | Vanderbilt (14–6) | Arizona (14–9) | Texas (21–10) | Vanderbilt (24–10) | UC Irvine (24–9) | Wichita State (33–9) | Vanderbilt (34–13) | Cal State Fullerton (32–17) | Texas A&M (42–14) | LSU (43–16–1) | Texas A&M (46–17) | Cal State Fullerton (41–22) | Cal State Fullerton (41–22) | 11. |
| 12. | Miami (FL) | Long Beach State (2–1) | Virginia (10–0) | Baylor (10–1) | Kentucky (18–0) | Rice (17–6) | Virginia (23–5) | Missouri (22–8) | San Diego (27–11) | San Diego (31–11) | South Carolina (31–14) | South Carolina (33–15) | Georgia (33–17–1) | Missouri (37–17) | Arizona (38–17) | Wichita State (47–15) | Arizona (42–19) | Arizona (42–19) | 12. |
| 13. | Florida State | Clemson (3–0) | UC Irvine (7–0) | Rice (8–5) | Rice (12–6) | Wichita State (14–3) | Texas (18–8) | Vanderbilt (19–10) | Nebraska (25–6–1) | Nebraska (28–7–1) | Vanderbilt (31–13) | Wichita State (36–11) | Vanderbilt (37–15) | Coastal Carolina (43–11) | Nebraska (40–14–1) | Georgia (39–22–1) | Coastal Carolina (50–14) | Coastal Carolina (50–14) | 13. |
| 14. | Cal State Fullerton | Michigan (3–0) | Clemson (5–2) | Missouri (9–2) | Ole Miss (13–5) | Kentucky (20–2) | Kentucky (22–4) | Nebraska (24–4–1) | Oklahoma State (23–10) | Oklahoma State (27–11) | Missouri (29–14) | Georgia (31–15–1) | Coastal Carolina (41–11) | Georgia (35–19–1) | Texas A&M (43–16) | Stanford (37–22–2) | Texas A&M (46–19) | Texas A&M (46–19) | 14. |
| 15. | Michigan | Cal State Fullerton (2–1) | UCLA (5–1) | Wichita State (7–3) | Wichita State (11–3) | Virginia (19–4) | Rice (19–9) | Cal State Fullerton (18–10) | Texas (23–12) | Coastal Carolina (33–7) | Coastal Carolina (36–9) | Cal State Fullerton (29–16) | Missouri (34–17) | Arizona (35–16) | Missouri (38–19) | NC State (41–20) | Wichita State (48–17) | Wichita State (48–17) | 15. |
| 16. | Clemson | Missouri (3–0) | Baylor (7–0) | Virginia (11–2) | Baylor (13–4) | San Diego (16–7) | Texas A&M (21–6) | Long Beach State (18–11) | Virginia (29–9) | Georgia (27–12–1) | Kentucky (33–11) | Missouri (31–16) | Arizona (34–17) | California (32–17–2) т | Wichita State (44–15) | Oklahoma State (44–18) | NC State (42–22) | NC State (42–22) | 16. |
| 17. | Missouri | Oregon State (1–2) | Wichita State (3–3) | Kentucky (11–0) | UCLA (10–5) | Ole Miss (15–8) | Clemson (18–8) | California (21–7–1) | Kentucky (26–8) | Kentucky (30–9) | Georgia (29–14–1) | Coastal Carolina (38–11) | California (32–16–2) | LSU (39–16–1) т | Georgia (35–21–1) | San Diego (44–17) | Oklahoma State (44–18) | Oklahoma State (44–18) | 17. |
| 18. | Long Beach State | San Diego (1–2) | Missouri (6–2) | Clemson (7–4) | Coastal Carolina (15–2) | Coastal Carolina (18–4) | San Diego (19–10) | San Diego (22–11) | Cal State Fullerton (20–12) | Cal State Fullerton (23–13) | Stanford (25–13–2) | Stanford (27–15–2) | Wichita State (38–14) | Wichita State (41–15) | Long Beach State (37–19) | Fresno State (40–28) | San Diego (44–17) | San Diego (44–17) | 18. |
| 19. | UCLA | Virginia (4–0) | Oregon State (3–3) | UCLA (7–4) | Texas A&M (15–4) | Clemson (14–7) | Cal State Fullerton (15–9) | Virginia (24–9) | Coastal Carolina (28–7) | California (26–10–2) | Cal State Fullerton (26–15) | Arizona (31–15) | South Carolina (34–18) | Kentucky (41–15) | Texas (37–20) | Missouri (39–21) | Missouri (39–21) | Missouri (39–21) | 19. |
| 20. | Texas A&M | UC Irvine (2–0) | Kentucky (9–0) | Coastal Carolina (12–1) | Virginia (14–4) | Texas A&M (17–6) | California (18–5–1) | Oklahoma State (20–9) | California (23–9–2) | Arizona (25–11) | Arizona (28–13) | California (29–15–2) | Kentucky (38–14) | Stanford (31–19–2) | Stanford (33–21–2) | Nebraska (41–16–1) | Nebraska (41–16–1) | Nebraska (41–16–1) | 20. |
| 21. | Virginia | UCLA (1–1) | San Diego (5–4) | Cal State Fullerton (8–4) | Clemson (10–6) | Cal State Fullerton (12–8) | Coastal Carolina (21–6) | Coastal Carolina (24–7) | Georgia (23–12) | Virginia (31–11) | Long Beach State (26–15) | NC State (32–14) | Stanford (29–18–2) | Vanderbilt (37–18) | Vanderbilt (40–20) | Texas (39–22) | Texas (39–22) | Texas (39–22) | 21. |
| 22. | UC Irvine | Baylor (3–0) | Oklahoma State (7–1) | Georgia Tech (12–1) | San Diego (12–7) | Oklahoma State (15–6) | Nebraska (21–4–1) | Arizona (15–11) | Arizona (20–11) | Stanford (21–12–1) | California (27–13–2) | Kentucky (34–14) | Michigan (38–11) | South Carolina (37–19) | California (33–19–2) | Long Beach State (38–21) | Long Beach State (38–21) | Long Beach State (38–21) | 22. |
| 23. | Louisville | Kentucky (3–0) | Michigan (4–3) | Texas A&M (11–3) | Cal State Fullerton (9–7) | Baylor (13–7) | Oklahoma State (18–8) | Ole Miss (20–11) | Ole Miss (24–12) | Long Beach State (23–14) | NC State (30–13) | Michigan (34–11) | NC State (35–16) | Long Beach State (34–18) | Michigan (45–12) | Kentucky (44–19) | Kentucky (44–19) | Kentucky (44–19) | 23. |
| 24. | Mississippi State | Oklahoma State (4–0) | Coastal Carolina (8–1) | Arkansas (11–1) | California (13–2–1) | UCLA (10–8) | Georgia Tech (22–5) | Georgia (20–10) | Long Beach State (19–14) | Michigan (28–8) | UNC Wilmington (33–9–1) | East Carolina (36–13) | LSU (35–16–1) | Michigan (42–12) | Kentucky (42–17) | Oral Roberts (48–14) | Oral Roberts (48–14) | Oral Roberts (48–14) | 24. |
| 25. | Kentucky | Louisville (2–1) | Texas A&M (7–2) | Oklahoma State (9–3) | Oregon State (7–6) | Oregon State (9–7) | Florida (20–6) | Georgia Tech (25–7) | Stanford (17–11–1) | Texas (23–16) | Oregon State (20–14) | Long Beach State (27–17) | Long Beach State (30–18) | Texas (34–19) | Oral Roberts (46–12) | Vanderbilt (41–22) | Vanderbilt (41–22) | Vanderbilt (41–22) | 25. |
| 26. | Baylor | Coastal Carolina (3–0) | Cal State Fullerton (3–4) | Oregon State (9–3) | Oklahoma State (11–5) | Florida (17–4) | Oregon State (13–8) | Stanford (15–9) | East Carolina (26–9) | Ole Miss (25–15) | Texas (26–18) | Texas (29–19) | UNC Wilmington (39–11–1) | NC State (37–18) | South Carolina (38–21) | Georgia Tech (41–21) | Georgia Tech (41–21) | Georgia Tech (41–21) | 26. |
| 27. | Oklahoma State | Texas A&M (2–2) | Georgia Tech (7–1) | San Diego (7–7) | Stanford (8–4) | Georgia Tech (17–5) | Ole Miss (16–11) | Clemson (18–13) | Michigan (22–8) | UNC Wilmington (29–8–1) | Virginia (32–15) | LSU (32–16–1) | Southern Miss (37–15) | Georgia Tech (38–17) | NC State (38–20) | South Carolina (40–23) | South Carolina (40–23) | South Carolina (40–23) | 27. |
| 28. | Louisiana–Lafayette | Georgia Tech (3–0) | Louisville (4–2) | Pepperdine (10–3) | Georgia Tech (13–4) | California (15–4–1) | UCLA (12–10) | UNC Wilmington (23–5–1) | Georgia Tech (26–10) | NC State (27–12) | Michigan (30–10) | Virginia (33–15) | Texas (29–19) | East Carolina (39–17) т | Georgia Tech (39–19) | Michigan (46–14) | Michigan (46–14) | Michigan (46–14) | 28. |
| 29. | Fresno State | Southern Miss (3–0) | Pepperdine (5–2) | Stanford (8–4) | Pepperdine (13–5) | Stanford (9–5) | Baylor (16–9) | Florida (21–10) | Florida (24–12) | Oregon State (18–13) | Southern Miss (31–13) | UNC Wilmington (35–11–1) | Georgia Tech (36–15) | UNC Wilmington (41–13–1) т | Elon (43–16) | California (33–21–2) | California (33–21–2) | California (33–21–2) | 29. |
| 30. | Coastal Carolina | Pepperdine (2–1) | Arkansas (6–1) | California (9–1–1) | UCF (16–1) | Nebraska (17–3–1) | UNC Wilmington (21–4) | Baylor (19–11) | UNC Wilmington (26–7–1) | Oral Roberts (29–8) | East Carolina (32–13) | Southern Miss (34–15) | East Carolina (36–16) | Oral Roberts (43–12) | TCU (43–17) | Houston (42–24) | Houston (42–24) | Houston (42–24) | 30. |
| | Preseason Jan 17 | Week 1 Feb 25 | Week 2 Mar 3 | Week 3 Mar 10 | Week 4 Mar 17 | Week 5 Mar 24 | Week 6 Mar 31 | Week 7 Apr 7 | Week 8 Apr 14 | Week 9 Apr 21 | Week 10 Apr 28 | Week 11 May 5 | Week 12 May 12 | Week 13 May 19 | Week 14 May 26 | Week 15 June 3 | Week 16 June 10 | Final June 25 | |
| | | Dropped: 24 Mississippi State; 28 Louisiana–Lafayette; 29 Fresno State | Dropped: 29 Southern Miss | Dropped: 23 Michigan; 28 Louisville | Dropped: 24 Arkansas | Dropped: 29 Pepperdine; 30 UCF | Dropped: 29 Stanford | Dropped: 26 Oregon State; 28 UCLA | Dropped: 27 Clemson; 30 Baylor | Dropped: 26 East Carolina; 28 Georgia Tech; 29 Florida | Dropped: 26 Ole Miss; 30 Oral Roberts | Dropped: 25 Oregon State | Dropped: 28 Virginia | Dropped: 27 Southern Miss | Dropped: 28 East Carolina; 28 UNC Wilmington | Dropped: 29 Elon; 30 TCU | None | None | |

The Preseason poll ranked the top 35 teams. Teams not listed above were: 31. Georgia Tech 32. Pepperdine 33. Southern Miss 34. LSU 35. Arkansas
