= 2008 College Baseball All-America Team =

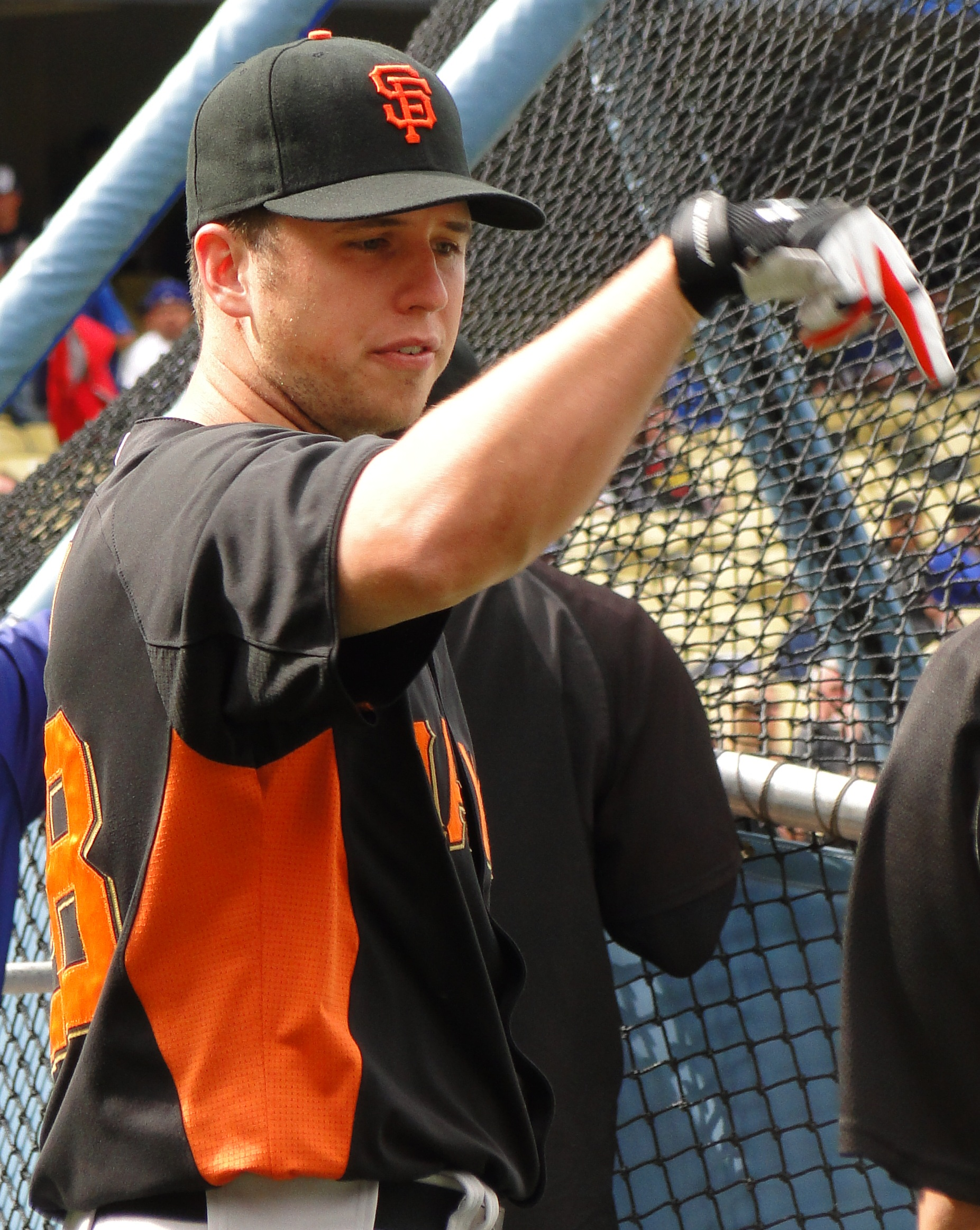
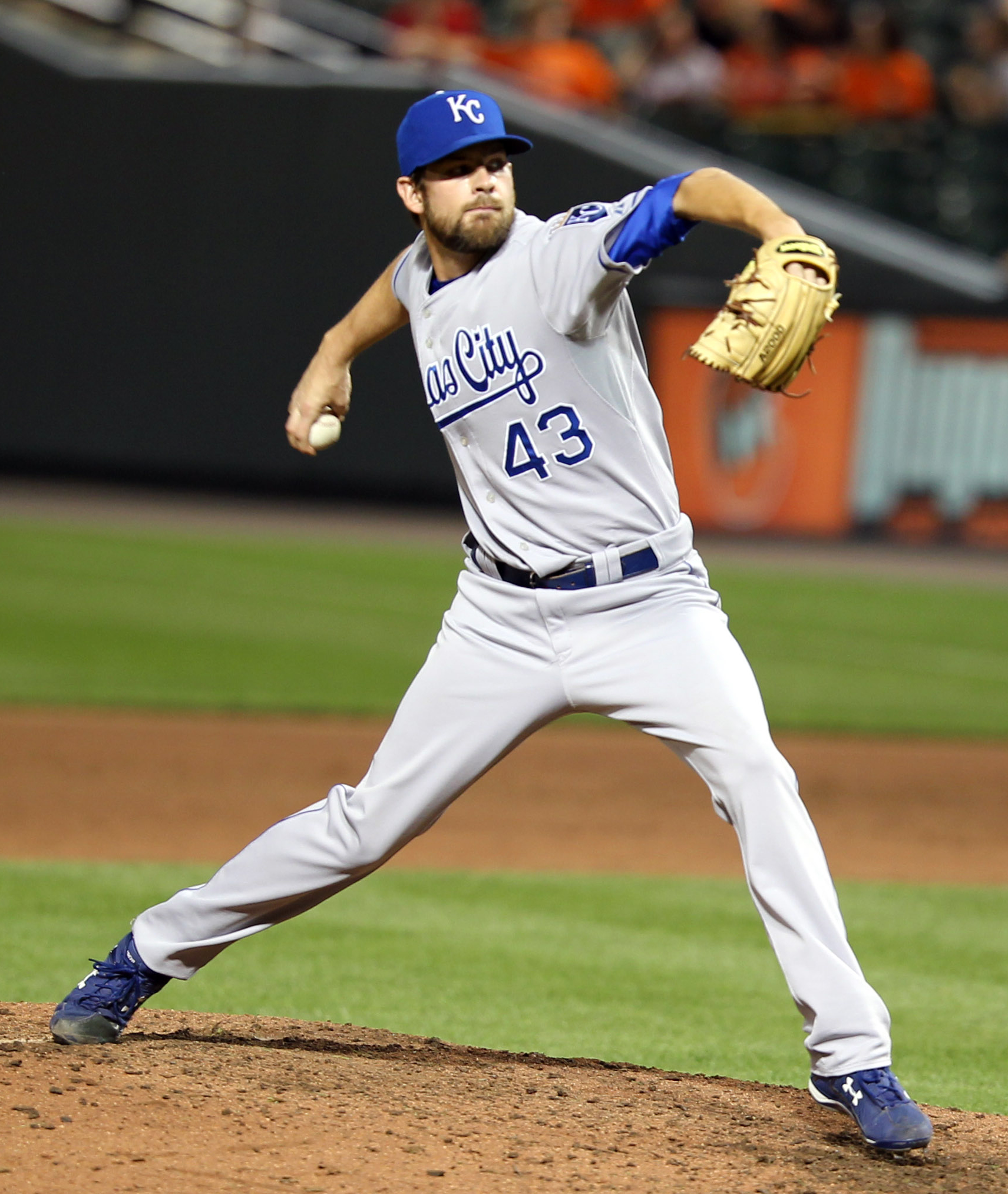
2008 All-Americans included 2010 NL Rookie of the Year Buster Posey (left) and Roger Clemens Award winner Aaron Crow (right).

This is a list of college baseball players named first team All-Americans for the 2008 NCAA Division I baseball season. From 2006 to 2010, there were five generally recognized All-America selectors for baseball: the American Baseball Coaches Association, Baseball America, Collegiate Baseball Newspaper, the National Collegiate Baseball Writers Association, and Rivals.com. In order to be considered a "consensus" All-American, a player must have been selected by at least three of these.

== Key ==
A	American Baseball Coaches Association
B	Baseball America
C	Collegiate Baseball Newspaper
N	National Collegiate Baseball Writers Association
R	Rivals.com
	Member of the National College Baseball Hall of Fame
	Consensus All-American – selected by all five organizations
	Consensus All-American – selected by three or four organizations

== All-Americans ==
Position	Name	School	#	A	B	C	N	R	Other awards and honors
Starting pitcher	Tim Clubb	Missouri State	1	—	—	✓	—	—	
Starting pitcher	Aaron Crow	Missouri	5	✓	✓	✓	✓	✓	Roger Clemens Award
Starting pitcher	Scott Gorgen	UC Irvine	4	✓	—	✓	✓	✓	
Starting pitcher	Chris Hernandez	Miami (FL)	2	✓	—	✓	—	—	
Starting pitcher	Shooter Hunt	Tulane	1	—	—	—	✓	—	
Starting pitcher	Brian Matusz	San Diego	5	✓	✓	✓	✓	✓	
Starting pitcher	Rob Musgrave	Wichita State	1	—	✓	—	—	—	
Starting pitcher	Stephen Strasburg	San Diego State	5	✓	✓	✓	✓	✓	
Relief pitcher	Scott Bittle	Ole Miss	3	—	✓	—	✓	✓	
Relief pitcher	Andrew Cashner	TCU	1	✓	—	—	—	—	
Relief pitcher	Tyler Conn	Southern Miss	1	—	—	—	✓	—	
Relief pitcher	Josh Fields	Georgia	3	—	—	✓	✓	✓	Stopper of the Year
Catcher	Buster Posey	Florida State	5	✓	✓	✓	✓	✓	Dick Howser Trophy Golden Spikes Award ABCA Player of the Year Baseball America Player of the Year Collegiate Baseball Player of the Year Brooks Wallace Award Johnny Bench Award
First baseman / DH	Justin Smoak	South Carolina	5	✓	✓	✓	✓	✓	
Second baseman	Josh Satin	California	1	—	✓	—	—	—	
Second baseman	Jemile Weeks	Miami (FL)	4	✓	—	✓	✓	✓	
Shortstop	Gordon Beckham	Georgia	5	✓	✓	✓	✓	✓	
Third baseman	Jeremie Tice	Charleston	1	—	—	✓	—	—	
Third baseman	Brett Wallace	Arizona State	4	✓	✓	—	✓	✓	
Outfielder	Sawyer Carroll	Kentucky	4	—	✓	✓	✓	✓	
Outfielder	Collin Cowgill	Kentucky	1	—	—	—	✓	—	
Outfielder	Blake Dean	LSU	1	—	✓	—	—	—	
Outfielder	Tim Fedroff	North Carolina	2	✓	—	—	—	✓	
Outfielder	Brian Miller	Troy	1	—	—	✓	—	—	
Outfielder	Chris Shehan	Georgia Southern	3	✓	✓	—	✓	—	
Outfielder	Eric Thames	Pepperdine	1	—	—	—	—	✓	
Outfielder	Brian Van Kirk	Oral Roberts	2	✓	—	✓	—	—	
Designated hitter	Ben Carlson	Missouri State	1	✓	—	—	—	—	
Designated hitter / 1B	Yonder Alonso	Miami (FL)	4	—	✓	✓	✓	✓	
Utility player	Ike Davis	Arizona State	5	✓	✓	✓	✓	✓	

== See also ==
- List of college baseball awards
