= Scott Cousins =

American baseball player (born 1985)

- Outfielder
- Born: January 22, 1985 (age 41); Sparks, Nevada, U.S.
- Batted: Left Threw: Left

MLB debut
- September 3, 2010, for the Florida Marlins

Last MLB appearance
- May 9, 2013, for the Los Angeles Angels of Anaheim

MLB statistics
- Batting average: .179
- Home runs: 2
- Runs batted in: 9
- Stats at Baseball Reference

Teams
- Florida / Miami Marlins (2010–2012); Los Angeles Angels of Anaheim (2013)

Scott Michael Cousins (born January 22, 1985) is an American former professional baseball outfielder. He played in Major League Baseball (MLB) for the Florida / Miami Marlins and Los Angeles Angels of Anaheim from 2010 through 2013.

== Early life ==
Scott Michael Cousins was born on January 22, 1985, in Sparks, Nevada. Cousins, at 6'1" and 197 lbs, attended North Valleys High School in Reno, Nevada ('03) where he was a standout in both baseball and basketball.

== College career ==
As a sophomore at the University of San Francisco in 2005, Cousins batted .309 with 30 RBIs, 13 stolen bases, and 7 home runs. On the mound, he went 8–5 with a 2.64 ERA and 76 strikeouts.

In 2006, as a junior, Cousins hit .343 with 46 RBIs, 21 stolen bases, and 7 home runs for the Dons. He also won 4 games striking out 61 batters. For his performance, Cousins was named a first-team All-American and the 2006 West Coast Conference Player of the Year. Cousins' play helped the Dons win their first WCC title and make an inaugural trip to the NCAA Regionals.

== Professional career ==
=== Draft and minor leagues ===
Cousins was drafted by the Florida Marlins in the third round (95th overall) of the 2006 Major League Baseball draft.

In 2007, playing for the Single-A Greensboro Grasshoppers of the South Atlantic League, Cousins hit .292 with 18 home runs, 74 RBI, and 16 stolen bases. He earned MiLB.com Single-A Best Single-Game Performer honors when he slugged three home runs and drove in a career-high nine RBI on August 22 against the Hickory Crawdads; in the game, he hit a game-tying two-run home run, a grand slam, the first of his career, and an inning later, he finished his day with a three-run homer.

In 2008, as a member of the Mesa Solar Sox, Cousins led the Arizona Fall League in RBI with 33 and hit .297 with 6 home runs. In 2009 for the Jacksonville Suns, Cousins batted .263 with 74 RBI, 12 home runs, 27 stolen bases, and led all Double-A with 11 triples (also setting a Marlins' minor league record). Cousins was added to the Marlins' 40-man roster following the 2009 season to protect him from the Rule 5 draft.

=== Florida / Miami Marlins (2010–2012) ===
Cousins hit .285 with 14 home runs, 49 RBI, and 12 stolen bases for the New Orleans Zephyrs in the Triple-A Pacific Coast League before being called up to the major leagues on September 2, 2010. Cousins recorded his first career hit, a walk-off single, against the Atlanta Braves on September 5. Regarding Cousins' call up, USF head coach Nino Giarratano stated, "Academically, athletically and personally he is most deserving of the opportunity and a lifetime of opportunities in Major League Baseball." On September 24 and 25, Cousins became the first major leaguer since Willie McGee in 1982 to record back-to-back pinch hit triples when he hit three baggers against the Milwaukee Brewers at Miller Park. He made 27 appearances for the Marlins during his rookie campaign, batting .297/.316/.459 with two RBI and one walk.

On April 21, 2011, Cousins hit his first career home run, a grand slam off James McDonald of the Pittsburgh Pirates. On May 25, during a game against the San Francisco Giants, Cousins collided with catcher Buster Posey at home plate after tagging up from third base on a sacrifice fly from Emilio Bonifácio. Posey sustained a broken fibula and three torn ligaments in his left ankle, causing him to miss the rest of the season. Cousins said he hit Posey on purpose so that he could score. "If you go in first feet and slide they punish you. If you hit them, you punish them and you punish yourself, but you have a chance of that ball coming out." While Cousins maintained that he did not intend to injure Posey, many others disagreed, and argued that Cousins hit Posey with the intention of hurting him. This collision led to MLB and the Major League Baseball Players Association to agree to a new rule intended to limit home plate collisions. Cousins made 48 total appearances for Florida on the year, going 7-for-52 (.135) with one home run, four RBI, and one stolen base.

On June 15, 2012, Cousins was recalled to the majors. Two days later, on June 17, Cousins made his first start as a Marlin since being called up. He went 3-for-7 against the Tampa Bay Rays, including a game-winning RBI triple in the 15th inning. Cousins made 53 appearances for Florida during the regular season, slashing .163/.200/.267 with one home run, three RBI, and one stolen base.

=== Los Angeles Angels of Anaheim (2013) ===
On October 17, 2012, Cousins was claimed on waivers by the Toronto Blue Jays. On November 1, Cousins was designated for assignment by the Toronto following the acquisition of Scott Maine. He was claimed off waivers again on November 6, this time by the Seattle Mariners. On November 20, the Mariners designated him for assignment after multiple prospects were added to the 40-man roster.

The Los Angeles Angels of Anaheim claimed Cousins on November 30, 2012. He made seven appearances for the Angels in 2013, going 0-for-4 with one walk. Cousins was designated for assignment following the acquisition of Chris Nelson on May 18, 2013. He cleared waivers and was sent outright to the Triple-A Salt Lake Bees on May 21. In 54 appearances for the Bees and the rookie-level Arizona League Angels, Cousins hit .235, with three doubles, five triples, one home run, and 19 RBI to go along with six stolen bases.

=== Texas Rangers ===
Cousins signed a minor league contract with the Boston Red Sox on January 24, 2014. He was released by the Red Sox organization on March 29. On April 16, Cousins signed a minor league contract with the Texas Rangers. With the Texas, he attempted to convert into a pitcher, but did not pitch in any games during the entirety of the season. Cousins was released by the Rangers organization on March 17, 2015.

=== Somerset Patriots ===
On April 7, 2015, Cousins signed with the Somerset Patriots of the Atlantic League of Professional Baseball. In 43 games for Somerset, he slashed .264/.362/.325 with one home run, 18 RBI, and 12 stolen bases. Cousins retired from professional baseball on July 7.

== Post-playing career ==
In 2016, Cousins became an area scout based in Scottsdale, Arizona, for the Oakland Athletics.
