= Buster Posey =

American baseball player and executive (born 1987)

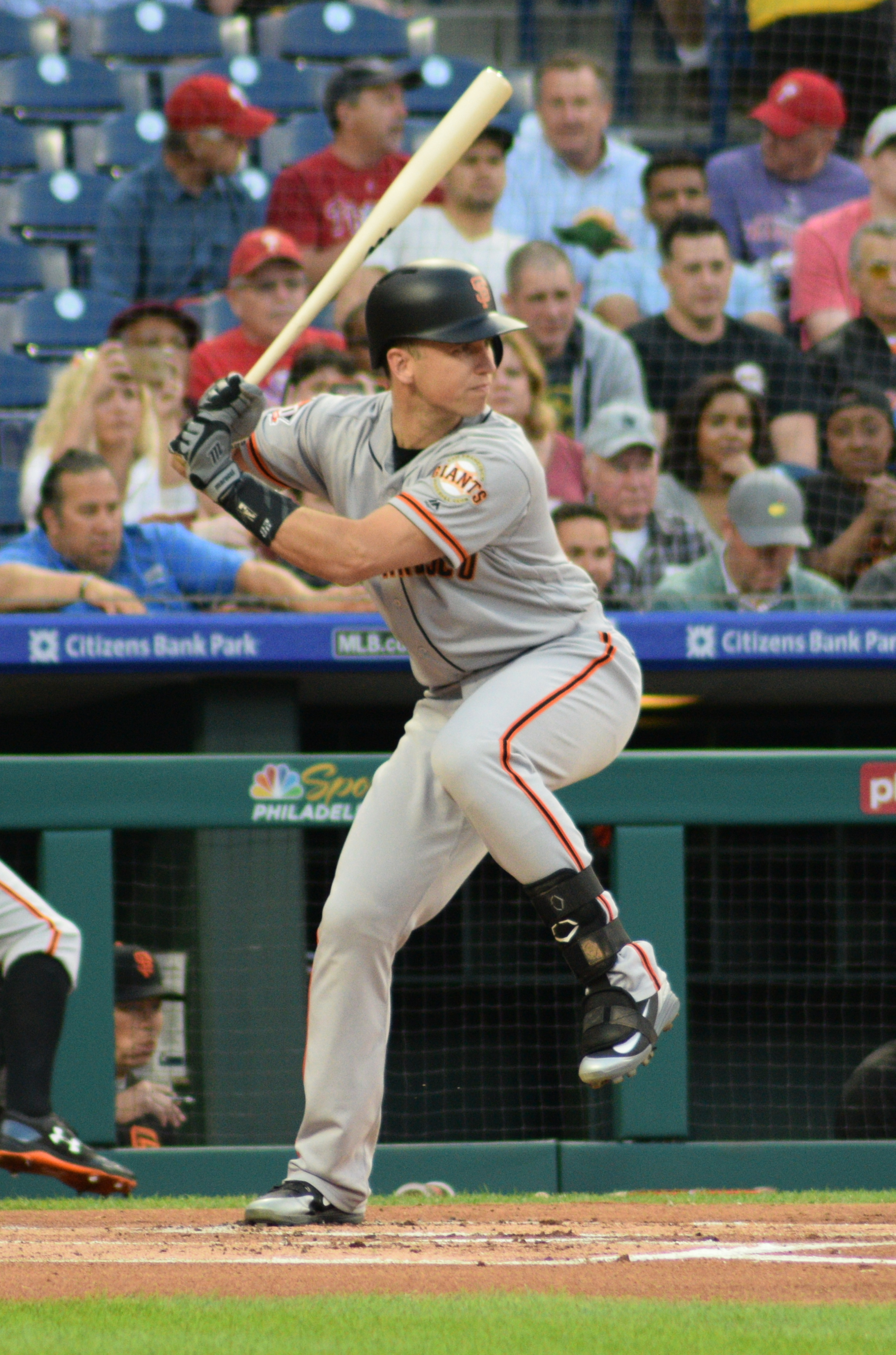
- Posey with the San Francisco Giants in 2018

San Francisco Giants
- Catcher / President of Baseball Operations
- Born: March 27, 1987 (age 39); Leesburg, Georgia, U.S.
- Batted: Right Threw: Right

MLB debut
- September 11, 2009, for the San Francisco Giants

Last MLB appearance
- October 3, 2021, for the San Francisco Giants

MLB statistics
- Batting average: .302
- Home runs: 158
- Runs batted in: 729
- Stats at Baseball Reference

Teams
- As player: San Francisco Giants (2009–2019, 2021); As executive: San Francisco Giants (2025–present)

Career highlights and awards
- 7× All-Star (2012, 2013, 2015–2018, 2021); 3× World Series champion (2010, 2012, 2014); NL MVP (2012); NL Rookie of the Year (2010); Gold Glove Award (2016); 5× Silver Slugger Award (2012, 2014, 2015, 2017, 2021); NL Hank Aaron Award (2012); 2× NL Comeback Player of the Year (2012, 2021); NL batting champion (2012); Golden Spikes Award (2008); Dick Howser Trophy (2008); San Francisco Giants Wall of Fame
Medals
Men's baseball
Representing United States
World Baseball Classic
| Gold medal – first place | 2017 Los Angeles | Team |

Gerald Dempsey "Buster" Posey III (born March 27, 1987) is an American baseball executive and former professional baseball catcher. He is currently the president of baseball operations for the San Francisco Giants of Major League Baseball (MLB). He spent his entire 12-year Major League Baseball (MLB) career with the Giants, from 2009 until his retirement at the conclusion of the 2021 season. Internationally, Posey represented the United States. In the 2017 World Baseball Classic (WBC), he helped win Team USA's first gold medal in a WBC tournament.

Posey was born in Leesburg, Georgia. He played four sports in high school; in baseball, he excelled at hitting and pitching. He attended Florida State University, where he began playing the catcher and first base positions. He won the Golden Spikes Award and the Brooks Wallace Award in 2008.

The Giants selected him with the fifth overall pick in the first round of the 2008 MLB draft. Posey made his MLB debut on September 11, 2009. He and Madison Bumgarner both made their Major League debuts in 2009 and established a reputation as one of the best batteries in recent MLB history. As a rookie, Posey finished with a .305 batting average, 18 home runs, and 67 runs batted in. He caught every inning of the playoffs as the Giants won the 2010 World Series. He was named the NL Rookie of the Year. In May 2011, after he was severely injured in a collision with the Florida Marlins' Scott Cousins at home plate, Posey missed the rest of the year. The collision is widely seen as pushing Major League Baseball to adopt rule 7.13 regarding blocking the plate prior to the 2014 season, informally known as the "Buster Posey Rule". Posey returned from his injury in 2012 and caught Matt Cain's perfect game, batted .336 to win the 2012 NL batting title and was voted the 2012 NL MVP. He won his second World Series that year, as the Giants swept the Detroit Tigers in four games. In 2013, Posey signed a franchise-record eight-year, $167 million contract extension with the Giants. He won his third World Series the following year as the Giants defeated the Kansas City Royals. Posey is the second player in MLB history, after Pete Rose, to win the Rookie of the Year, a League MVP, and three World Series championships.

Posey played in four no-hitters in his career, catching three of them. In 2016, he won a Gold Glove Award. In 2019, the Johnny Bench Award was renamed the Buster Posey Award, which honors college baseball's top NCAA Division I catcher. After opting out of the shortened 2020 MLB season due to the COVID-19 pandemic, Posey led the Giants to a franchise-record 107 wins in his final season in 2021.

In September 2022, Posey joined the Giants' ownership group and two years later became their president of baseball operations.

== Early life ==
Gerald Dempsey Posey III was born on March 27, 1987, in Leesburg, Georgia, to Demp and Traci Posey. He is the oldest of four children. He and his family grew up Methodist Christian. Posey has an uncle who is a Methodist minister and an aunt who is a camp minister for Duke University. His nickname, "Buster", came from his father's childhood nickname. Posey grew up a fan of the Atlanta Braves. He also played football, soccer, and basketball growing up, but baseball was his main sport.

As a junior at Lee County High School, Posey pitched and played shortstop. That year he hit nine doubles, three triples, and seven home runs while setting school records for batting average (.544) and runs batted in (RBI) (46). His pitching achievements included a 10–1 record and a 1.53 earned run average (ERA). In his senior year, he batted .462 with 40 RBIs while setting a school record with 14 home runs. In 13 starts as a pitcher that year, he had a 12–0 record with a 1.06 ERA and 108 strikeouts. In the Georgia AAAA State Championship, Lee County was defeated by Henry County High, for whom fellow future major leaguer Jason Heyward played.

After his senior season, Posey was named the Georgia Gatorade Player of the Year, the Louisville Slugger State Player of the Year, an EA Sports Second Team All-American, and a Baseball America All-American. He graduated with a 3.94 grade point average in high school, fourth in his class of 302 students.

== College career ==
Posey played college baseball for the Florida State Seminoles under coach Mike Martin. He played shortstop as a freshman at Florida State in 2006, starting all 65 games for the Seminoles. He was named a Louisville Slugger Freshman All-American. He finished his freshman season with a .346 batting average, four home runs and 48 RBI. As a sophomore, Posey moved to the catcher position on the suggestion of assistant coach Mike Martin Jr. He batted .382 with three home runs and 65 RBI. After one season of playing the position, Posey finished second to Ed Easley in Johnny Bench Award voting.

In 2008, as a junior, he hit .463 with 26 home runs and 93 RBI, won the ACC Baseball Player of the Year, Johnny Bench Award, and garnered the Collegiate Baseball Player of the Year award. On May 12, he hit a grand slam and played all nine fielding positions in a 10–0 victory over Savannah State University; as a pitcher that day, he struck out both batters he faced. Posey was awarded the Dick Howser Trophy and the Golden Spikes Award at the end of the year.

During the college offseason, Posey started at shortstop for the Yarmouth-Dennis Red Sox in 2006 when they won the Cape Cod Baseball League championship, and started at catcher in 2007 when they won another championship. He was named a league all-star in both seasons.

== Professional career ==
=== Drafts and minor leagues ===
Although he was drafted in the 50th round of the 2005 Major League Baseball (MLB) Draft by the Los Angeles Angels of Anaheim, he chose to enroll in college instead of signing a professional baseball contract. Posey was considered by Baseball America to be the best catcher available in the 2008 MLB draft. He was drafted by the San Francisco Giants with the fifth overall pick. On August 16, the Giants signed Posey shortly before the signing deadline for draftees and gave him a $6.2 million signing bonus, the largest up-front bonus in Giants history. Entering the 2009 season, Baseball America ranked him the number two prospect in the Giants' organization (behind Madison Bumgarner). He was invited to the Giants' spring training in 2009. Following spring training, Posey was assigned to the Giants' Class A Advanced affiliate, the San Jose Giants of the California League. In 80 games with San Jose, he batted .326 with 63 runs, 95 hits, 23 doubles, 13 home runs, and 58 RBI.

On July 13, Posey was promoted to the Giants' Class AAA team, the Fresno Grizzlies of the Pacific Coast League. In 35 games with Fresno, he batted .321 with 21 runs scored, 42 hits, eight doubles, five home runs, and 22 RBI.

=== San Francisco Giants (2009–2019, 2021) ===
==== 2009 ====
Because of an injury to Giants starting catcher Bengie Molina, Posey was called up to MLB for the first time on September 2, 2009. On September 11, 2009, Posey made his MLB debut, striking out in his first at bat against Hiroki Kuroda of the Los Angeles Dodgers. Posey got his first major league hit on September 19 against Jeff Weaver of the Dodgers. In 17 at-bats with the Giants in 2009, Posey had two hits.

Coming into 2010, Baseball America ranked Posey as the top prospect in the Giants' organization. After again appearing in the Giants' spring training camp, Posey began the 2010 season at Fresno, batting .349 with 31 runs scored, 60 hits, 13 doubles, six home runs, and 32 RBI in 47 games.

==== 2010 ====
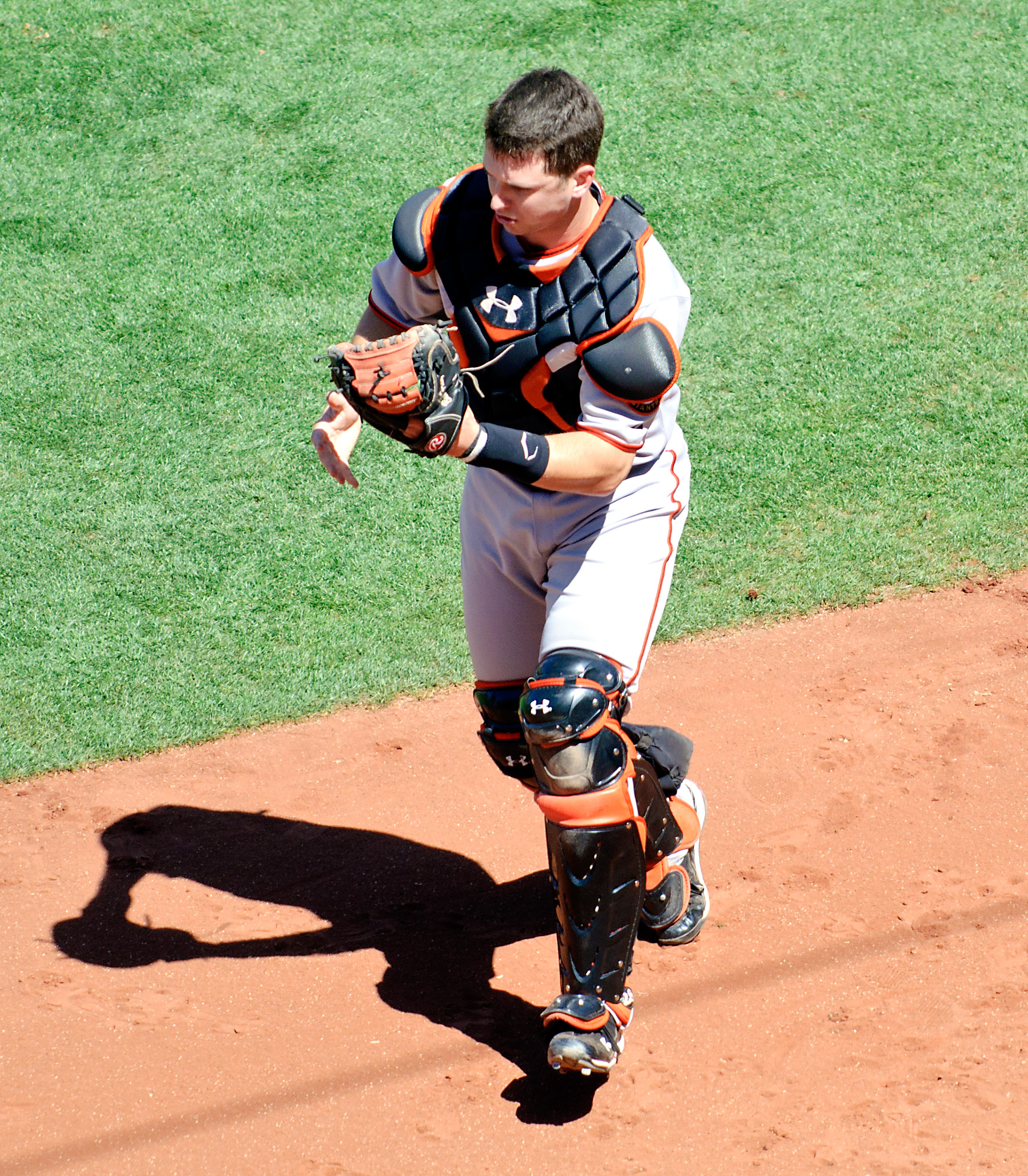
Posey catching in 2010

Posey was called up to the major leagues on May 29, 2010, and started at first base against the Arizona Diamondbacks. Posey drove in the first runs of his major league career, going three for four with three RBI. He appeared primarily at first base through the end of June. Posey hit his first career home run against Aaron Harang of the Cincinnati Reds on June 9. Following Molina's trade to the Texas Rangers on June 30, Posey became the starting catcher for the Giants.

Posey hit his first career grand slam against Chris Narveson of the Milwaukee Brewers on July 7, en route to a two-home run, four-hit, six-RBI night. This was part of a ten-game streak from July 1 to 10 during which he batted .514 with 19 hits, six home runs, and 13 RBI to set a National League (NL) record for rookies during any ten-day stretch according to the Elias Sports Bureau. This performance also earned him the NL Player of the Week honors for the week of July 5–11, 2010.

In a July 10 game against the Washington Nationals, Posey was inserted into the Giants' batting order as the clean-up hitter, which became his regular position in the lineup. He had a 21-game hitting streak that started July 4 and ended July 29 when Aníbal Sánchez of the Florida Marlins threw a one-hitter against the Giants. During the streak, which fell one game short of tying the San Francisco Giants' rookie mark set by Willie McCovey and five short of the team record, Posey batted .440 with 37 hits, six home runs, and 23 RBI. Posey was awarded both the NL Player of the Month and NL Rookie of the Month awards for his excellent July.

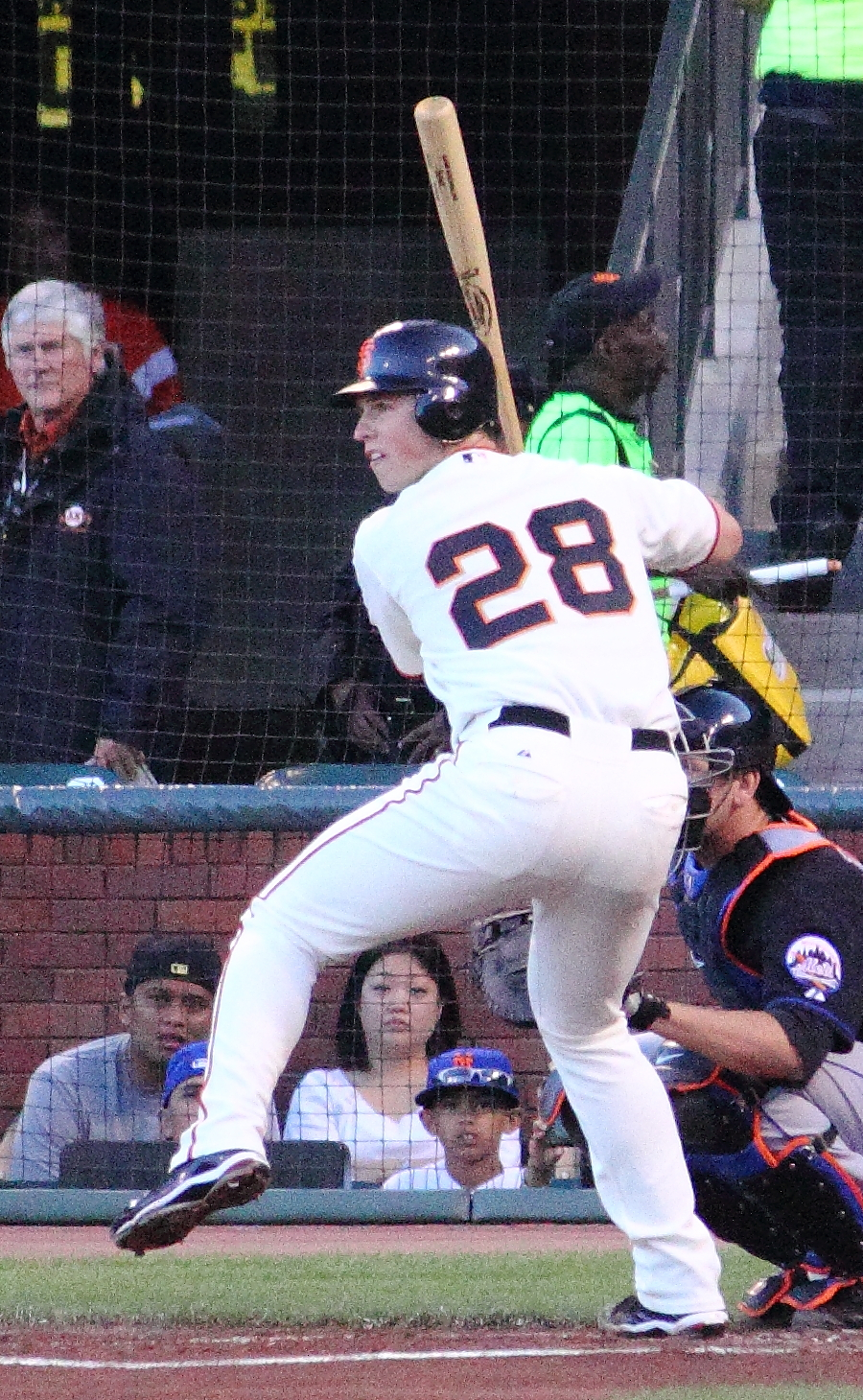
Posey batting in 2010

On September 21, Posey hit an eighth-inning home run against Andrew Cashner of the Chicago Cubs to win the game, 1–0. He hit another eighth-inning home run against Luke Gregerson of the San Diego Padres in the final game of the year on October 3 as the Giants secured the NL West Division championship by defeating the Padres 3–0. In 108 games, Posey batted .305 with 58 runs scored, 124 hits, 23 doubles, 18 home runs, and 67 RBI.

Posey was named the NL Rookie of the Year; Posey had 20 first place votes while Heyward, of the Atlanta Braves, finished second with nine. Posey was the sixth Giant to win the award, joining Willie Mays, Orlando Cepeda, Willie McCovey, Gary Matthews and John Montefusco. He was also the sixth catcher in NL history to win the award. Posey was named by his peers as the NL Players Choice Awards Outstanding Rookie. He was named the catcher on Baseball America's All-Rookie Team and the 2010 Topps Major League Rookie All-Star Team. He finished 11th in NL Most Valuable Player (MVP) voting.

In the NL Division Series (NLDS) against the Braves, Posey batted .375 as the Giants won the series in four games. In Game 4 of the NL Championship Series (NLCS) against the Philadelphia Phillies, he became the first rookie to get four hits in an NLCS game as the Giants won 6–5. He batted .217 with five hits and three RBI in the series as the Giants defeated the Phillies in six games. In Game 4 of the World Series against the Texas Rangers, Posey and Madison Bumgarner formed the first rookie starting pitcher-catcher tandem in a World Series since Yogi Berra caught Spec Shea in Game 1 of the 1947 World Series. Posey hit his first postseason home run against Darren O'Day in the 4–0 victory, making him the fifth rookie catcher to hit a home run in the World Series. The Giants won the series four games to one, giving Posey (who batted .300 with a home run and two RBI in the Series) his first World Series ring. Posey caught every inning of the playoffs for the Giants.

On November 3, the Giants celebrated their first World Series victory parade in San Francisco. In his speech, Posey said, "San Francisco Giants. World Series champions. Let's enjoy this today, tomorrow, for a week, maybe even a month. Then let's get back to work and make another run at it."

==== 2011 ====
Posey set season highs with three hits and four RBI on April 6, 2011, including a two-run home run against Tim Stauffer in an 8–4 victory over the Padres.

On May 25, during a game against the Florida Marlins, Posey was injured during a collision with Scott Cousins at home plate as Cousins scored the eventual winning run on a sac fly in the 12th inning of a 7–6 Giants' loss. Posey suffered a fractured fibula and torn ligaments in his ankle, requiring season-ending surgery. Cousins, who was not disciplined, said he collided with Posey intentionally in order to score. "If you hit them, you punish them and you punish yourself, but you have a chance of that ball coming out." He expressed regret over injuring Posey, saying, "I certainly didn't want him to get hurt." Cousins received threats from fans, but Posey denounced them: "I appreciate the continued support of Giants fans and others as I begin the process of working my way back ... But in no way do I condone threats of any kind against Scott Cousins or his family. As I said last week, I'm not out to vilify Scott." The collision led Major League Baseball to adopt rule 7.13, informally known as the "Buster Posey Rule", which states that "a runner attempting to score may not deviate from his direct pathway to the plate in order to initiate contact with the catcher (or other player covering home plate)." A runner violating the rule will be declared out, even if the fielder drops the ball. In 45 games, Posey batted .284 with 17 runs scored, 46 hits, five doubles, four home runs, and 21 RBI.

==== 2012 ====
Posey started at catcher during Matt Cain's perfect game on June 13, 2012, the 22nd in major league history. He stated afterwards that the game had him feeling "as nervous as I've ever been on a baseball field." He played in the 2012 Major League Baseball All-Star Game, his first, on July 10, going 0–2 with a walk and a run scored. After batting .289 with 10 home runs and 43 RBI in 77 games before the All-Star break, Posey batted .385 with 14 home runs and 60 RBI in the final 71 games of the season. On July 17, he had three hits and five RBI in a 9–0 victory over the Braves. Four days later, he had four hits and three RBI, including a two-run home run against Cole Hamels in a 10-inning, 6–5 victory over the Phillies. Two days later, he had three hits and four RBI, including a three-run home run against Clayton Richard in a 7–1 victory over the Padres. He hit a game-winning three-run home run against Lance Lynn on August 7 in a 4–2 victory over the St. Louis Cardinals. On September 17, he had three hits, including a game-winning two-run home run against Wade Miley in a 3–2 victory over the Diamondbacks. In 148 games, Posey had 78 runs scored, 178 hits (tied for eighth in the NL with David Wright), 39 doubles (tied for eighth with Yonder Alonso), 24 home runs, and 103 RBI (sixth).

Posey's teammate Melky Cabrera batted .346 in 2012, but MLB declared him ineligible for the batting title after receiving a 50-game suspension for raised testosterone levels. As a result, Posey led both leagues in batting in 2012 with an average of .336, becoming the first catcher to lead the NL in hitting since Ernie Lombardi of the Boston Braves in 1942. He also became only the second San Francisco Giant to win the batting title, following Barry Bonds in 2002 and 2004. Posey's .433 batting average against left-handed pitching (71 for 164) led all batters in the major leagues in 2012.

In Game 5 of the NLDS against the Reds on October 11, Posey hit a grand slam off of Reds starter Mat Latos to give the Giants a 6–0 lead and subsequently won the game. The Giants became the second NL team to win a Division Series after being down two games to none and first since the LDS became a permanent standard in the playoffs in 1995. Posey became just the third catcher in MLB history to hit a grand slam in the playoffs, along with Berra and Eddie Pérez. He also completed a strikeout-throw out double play at third base in the sixth inning to help preserve the victory. He batted .154 with four hits and one RBI in the NLCS as the Giants defeated the Cardinals in seven games. He hit a two-run home run against Max Scherzer in Game 4 of the World Series as the Giants swept the Detroit Tigers, giving Posey his second World Series championship.

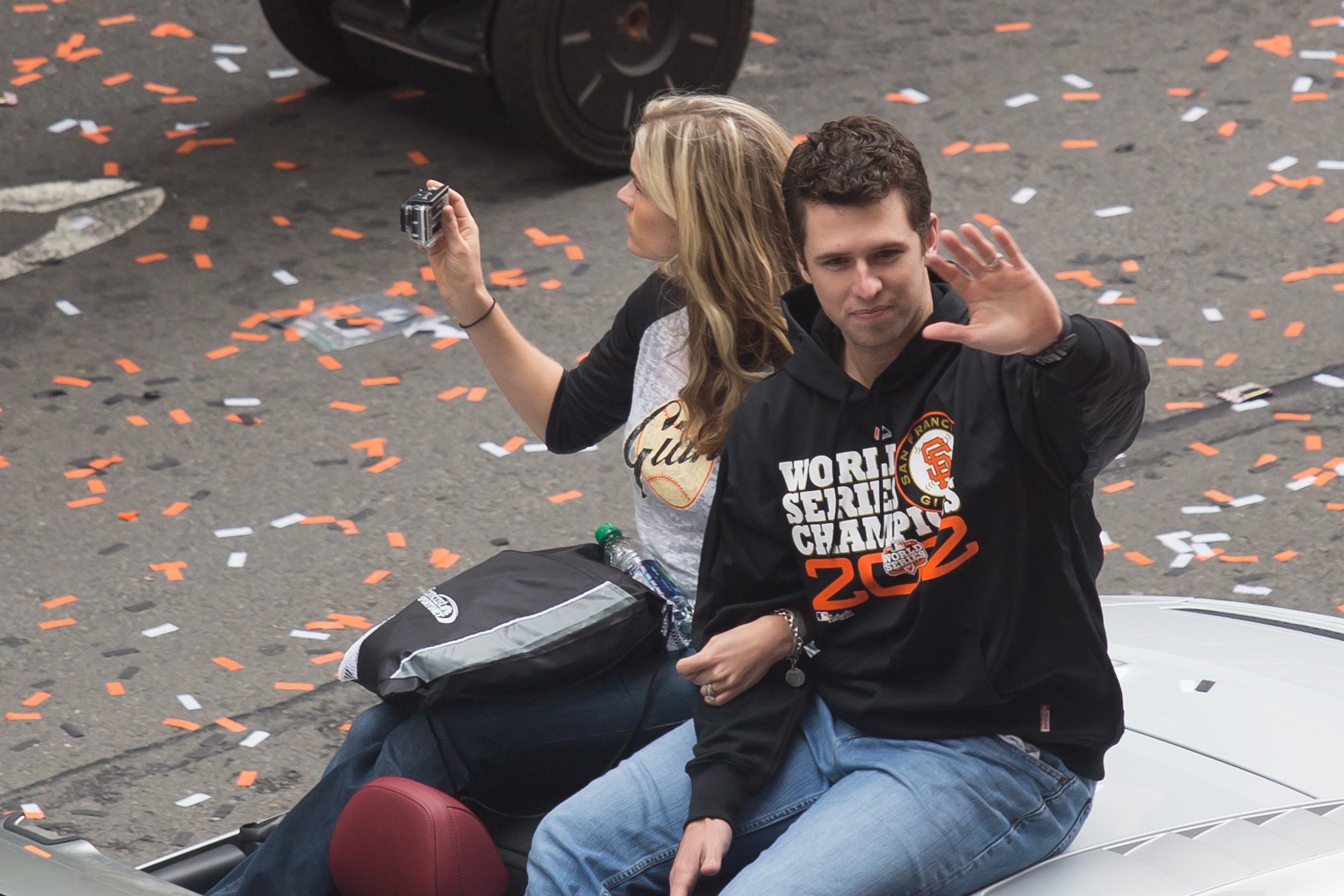
Posey and his wife, Kristen, at the 2012 World Series Parade

After the season, the Baseball Writers' Association of America named Posey the NL MVP. He won the Silver Slugger Award for the catcher position. He won the NL Hank Aaron Award, and Miguel Cabrera of the Tigers won the American League (AL) award, marking the first time in history that World Series opponents won the award in the same year. He was named the NL Comeback Player of the Year, and he received the Willie Mac Award from the Giants' organization.

==== 2013 ====
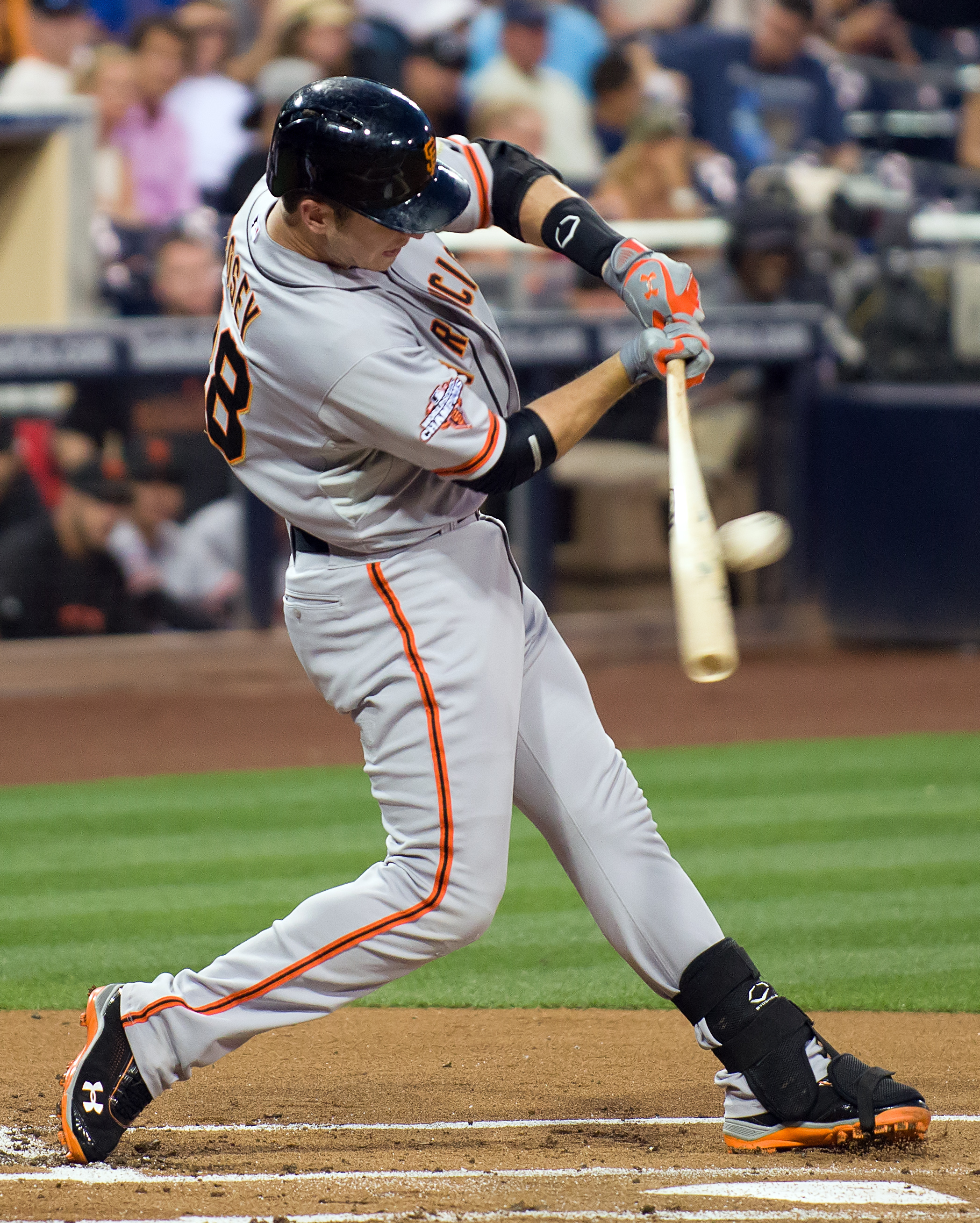
Posey hitting a pitch in 2013

Eligible for salary arbitration for the first time, Posey signed a one-year, $8 million contract with the Giants prior to spring training in 2013. On March 29, Posey agreed to an eight-year contract extension worth $167 million, said by the Giants to be the most lucrative in franchise history. The contract wiped out three arbitration years and five years of free agency for Posey, locking in his services through the 2021 season with a club option for 2022. The agreement was the second largest in major league history for a catcher, exceeded only by that of Joe Mauer in 2010 with the Minnesota Twins.

On July 1, 2013, Posey was named National League Player of the Week for the week of June 23–29. It was the second time Posey earned the award during his career, and the first since 2010. In six games Posey hit .500, to raise his average from .307 to .322, had an on-base percentage of .560, a slugging percentage of 1.182, stroked four home runs, and drove in six. On July 13, 2013, Posey caught Tim Lincecum's first no-hitter against the San Diego Padres. The no-hitter also marks the 15th ever in Giants history as well as the second performed in an away ballpark. On July 16, 2013, Posey played in his second straight All-Star Game, striking out in his only at-bat.

Posey's offense regressed in 2013 following his 2012 MVP season, especially in the second half of the season where he hit just 3 home runs. However, he still finished with a solid .294 batting average, 15 home runs and 72 runs batted in.

==== 2014 ====
On July 13, 2014, Posey and pitcher Madison Bumgarner hit grand slams against the Arizona Diamondbacks. It marked the first time that they both hit home runs in the same game and it also marked the first time in Major League Baseball history that a catcher and a pitcher hit grand slams in the same game. On August 29, 2014, in a 13–2 win over the Milwaukee Brewers at Oracle Park (then known as AT&T Park), Posey went 5-for-5 in 6 innings, and became the only catcher in Giants franchise history to have two career five-hit games.

Posey finished the 2014 season with a .311 batting average, 22 home runs, and 89 RBIs. In the 2014 World Series, the Giants defeated the Kansas City Royals in seven games, giving Posey his third championship in five years, before turning 28 years old. This win made Posey the second player in Major League history after Pete Rose to win the Rookie of the Year, a League MVP, and three World Series championships.

==== 2015 ====
Posey caught Santiago Casilla's immaculate inning save in May 2015 against the Cincinnati Reds, the first time that the Giants had struck out all three opposing batters in an inning on nine pitches since Trevor Wilson accomplished the feat in 1992.

On June 9, 2015, Posey caught rookie Chris Heston's no-hitter against the New York Mets at Citi Field, including the final out, a strikeout. It marks the seventeenth no-hitter in Giants franchise history. This was the third no-hitter during which Posey played catcher and the fourth overall, as he started at first base in Tim Lincecum's second career no-hitter. This put him one behind the record for no-hitters caught, held by the Philadelphia Phillies' Carlos Ruiz and the Boston Red Sox' Jason Varitek, tied with several other players.

On June 19, 2015, in a 9–5 win over the Los Angeles Dodgers at Dodger Stadium, Posey hit a grand slam and stole a base, becoming the first Giants catcher in 112 years since Roger Bresnahan to accomplish the feat. Four days later, in a 6–0 win over the San Diego Padres at Oracle Park, Posey hit another grand slam. On July 5, 2015, Posey was selected to his third career All-Star Game and was number one in voting for NL catchers. On September 6, 2015, at Coors Field, in a 7–4 win over the Colorado Rockies, Posey hit his 100th career home run.

On November 11, 2015, Posey was named winner of the 2015 Wilson Defensive Player of the Year award, given to the best defensive catcher in MLB. The following day, Posey was named winner of the 2015 National League Silver Slugger award at catcher. Posey finished 2015 with a .318 batting average, 19 home runs, and 95 RBIs.

==== 2016 ====
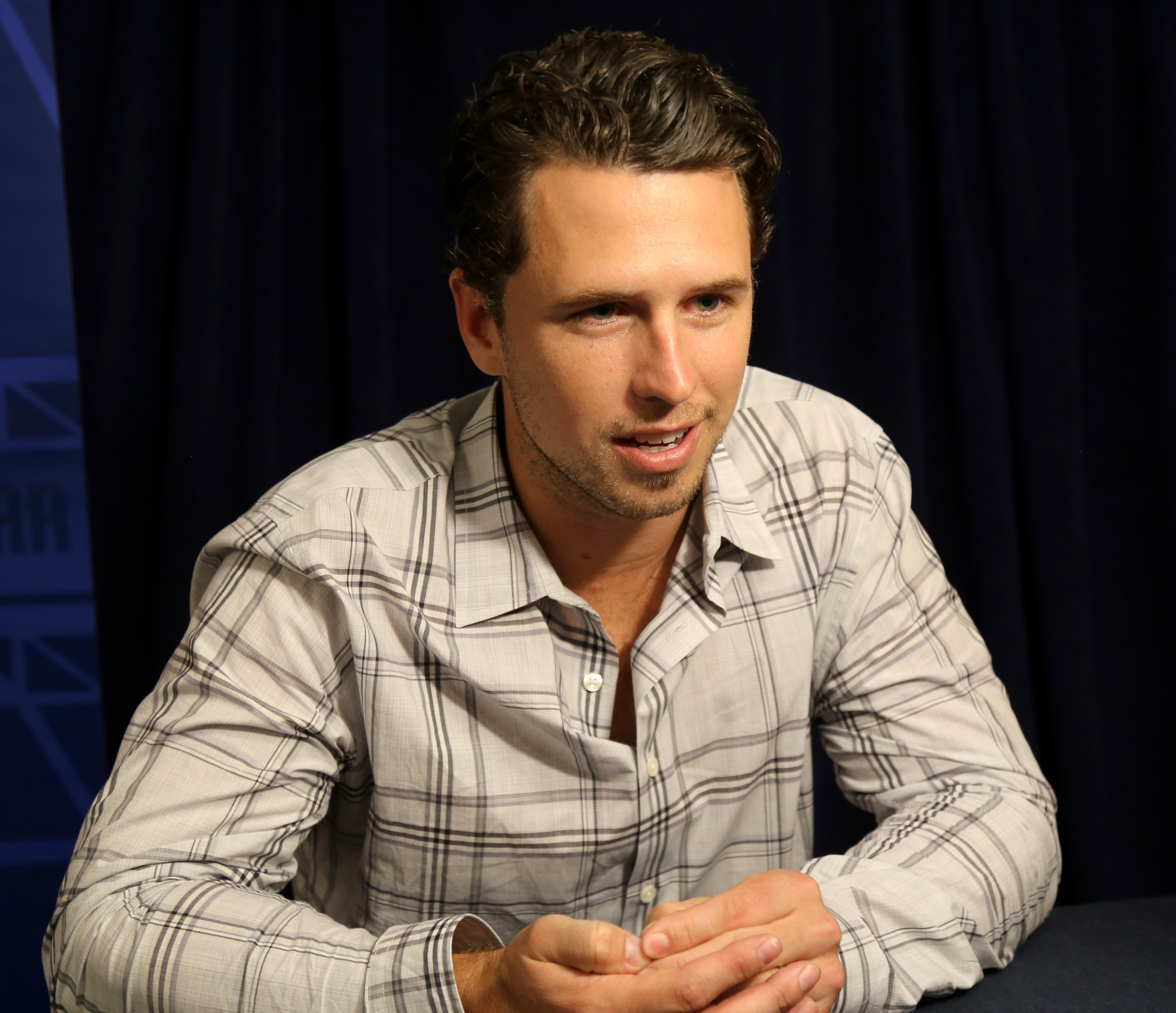
Posey at the 2016 Major League Baseball All-Star Game

Posey was selected by fan voting to start at catcher in the 2016 MLB All Star Game, Posey's fourth career MLB All-Star Game, the most all-time by a Giants catcher in franchise history. He was the catcher for battery mate Johnny Cueto, the second battery mate he started and caught for in the Midsummer Classic after teammate Matt Cain in 2012.

On September 27, in a 12–3 win over the Colorado Rockies, Posey recorded the 1,000th hit of his career, a solo home run off of Germán Márquez.

Posey finished the 2016 season with a .288 batting average, 14 home runs, and 80 RBIs. He also won his first Gold Glove Award. This award broke Yadier Molina's eight-year streak of winning the award for a catcher. Posey's all-around defensive skills as a catcher were highly regarded, including his pitch framing.

==== 2017 ====
While batting in the first inning in San Francisco's 2017 home opener, Posey was hit in the helmet by a 94 mph (151 km/h) pitch from Arizona Diamondbacks pitcher Taijuan Walker. Although Posey felt OK after receiving medical attention, Giants manager Bruce Bochy removed him from the game to undergo further tests. He was placed on the seven-day concussion disabled list the next day.

From May 8–10, Posey hit home runs in three consecutive games against the New York Mets at Citi Field. On May 12, Posey hit a walk-off home run in the bottom of the 17th inning against the Cincinnati Reds after catching all 17 innings. The home run set a new Giants franchise record for the latest walk-off home run, surpassing the 16th-inning home run hit by Willie Mays on July 2, 1963.

Owning a league-leading .339 batting average with ten home runs, Posey was named starting catcher for the 2017 MLB All-Star Game, his third consecutive All-Star start. He ended the season batting .320/.400/.462. End-of-season awards for Posey included selection as catcher on Baseball America's All-MLB Team.

==== 2018 ====
Batting .285 with five home runs and 27 RBIs in 74 games before the All-Star break, Posey was named to the 2018 MLB All-Star Game, but did not participate due to a hip injury. On August 25, the Giants announced that Posey would have season-ending hip surgery and be out 6–8 months. Posey's ability to hit for power had been compromised by the hip injury (which was a torn labrum) and the forty-five games before his season-ending surgery constituted the second-longest single season streak without hitting a home run in Posey's career. He ended the season batting .284/.359/.382. His 41 RBIs and five home runs over the course of the season were his fewest since 2015. Posey's baserunning was noticeably affected by the injury, and he had a career low percent of runners caught stealing. Bochy stated "I think we're doing the right thing by getting this taken care of so we can have him ready for next year".

==== 2019 ====
In 2019, he batted .257/.320/.368 with 43 runs, 7 home runs, and 38 RBIs in 405 at bats. Posey's He missed time during the season with a hamstring strain and a concussion. The homerless drought extended into the 2019 season and became the longest overall of his career, but it was broken on April 21 by Posey's first career home run against the Pittsburgh Pirates; this was his first home run since June 2018. In September, Posey made the first sacrifice bunt of his career. During the season, Posey at times batted lower in the batting order than he had since 2010. Maria Guardado, writing for Major League Baseball, described the 2019 season as the worst offensive season of Posey's career. His defense, though, was still well-regarded.

==== 2020–2021 ====
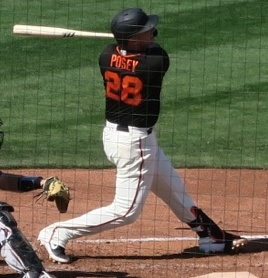
Posey batting with the Giants during spring training in 2020

Posey opted out of playing in the shortened 2020 season, largely due to his ongoing adoption of premature twin girls and the COVID-19 pandemic. Posey became the longest-tenured member of the Giants when he returned. In 2021, on his first swing since the 2019 season, Posey hit a solo home run off Marco Gonzales. Posey became the first player in franchise history to catch 1,000 games for the Giants. He was an NL All Star; it was his 7th time as an All Star.

In the 2021 regular season he batted .304/.390/.499, with his .889 OPS the second-highest of his career, with 68 runs, 18 home runs, and 56 RBIs in 395 at bats. According to ESPN Stats & Info, he joins Lou Brock, Will Clark, Roberto Clemente, David Ortiz, and Kirby Puckett as the sixth and only players to hit .300 in their final seasons in MLB's divisional play era (1969–present). His .304 batting average is the highest ever by a catcher in their final season, making him the only catcher to bat over .300 in their final season. On defense, he caught 31.1% of attempted base-stealers, 4th-best in the NL. At season-end, his .302 career batting average was 6th-highest among active players, and he was 4th of all active players in games played as a catcher, with 1,093.

In Game 1 of the 2021 NLDS, Posey nearly became the first right-handed batter to homer into McCovey Cove as a 3–0 shot off of opposing starter Walker Buehler bounced off a water tower and then into the bay (a home run must enter the water on the fly to be considered a "splash hit"). The Giants ultimately lost the series 3–2 to the Dodgers. He received the NL Silver Slugger award at catcher, his fifth overall Silver Slugger and his first since 2016, along with his second NL Comeback Player of the Year award.

Posey announced his retirement from baseball on November 4, 2021, making him just the fifth player in the San Francisco era to spend his entire career with the Giants (minimum of 10 seasons), joining Jim Davenport (1958–1970), Scott Garrelts (1982–1991), Robby Thompson (1986–1996) and former battery mate Matt Cain (2005–2017).

=== Career statistics ===
In 1,371 games over 12 seasons, Posey posted a .302 batting average (1,500-for-4,970) with 663 runs, 293 doubles, 158 home runs, 729 RBI, 540 walks, .372 on-base percentage, and a .460 slugging percentage. Defensively, he recorded a .995 fielding percentage in 1093 games played as a catcher and a .995 fielding percentage in 229 games played at first base. In 58 postseason games, he hit .252 (57-for-226) with 18 runs, 6 doubles, 5 home runs, 25 RBI and 23 walks.

== International career ==
Posey represented Team USA at the 2017 World Baseball Classic. He appeared in four games during the tournament, posting a .267 batting average with two home runs and a .980 OPS. Team USA went on to defeat Puerto Rico in the championship game, securing their first-ever World Baseball Classic title.

== Accomplishments and honors ==
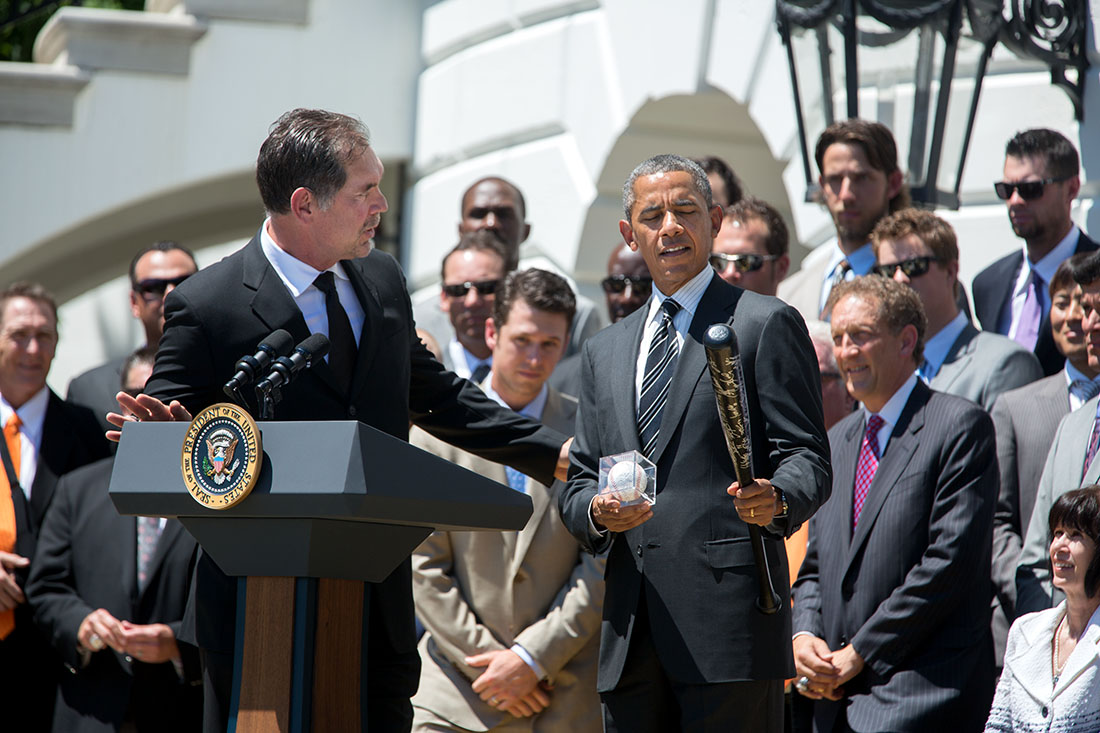
Posey with the Giants outside of the White House being honored by President Barack Obama during a ceremony honoring the team's 2012 World Series championship

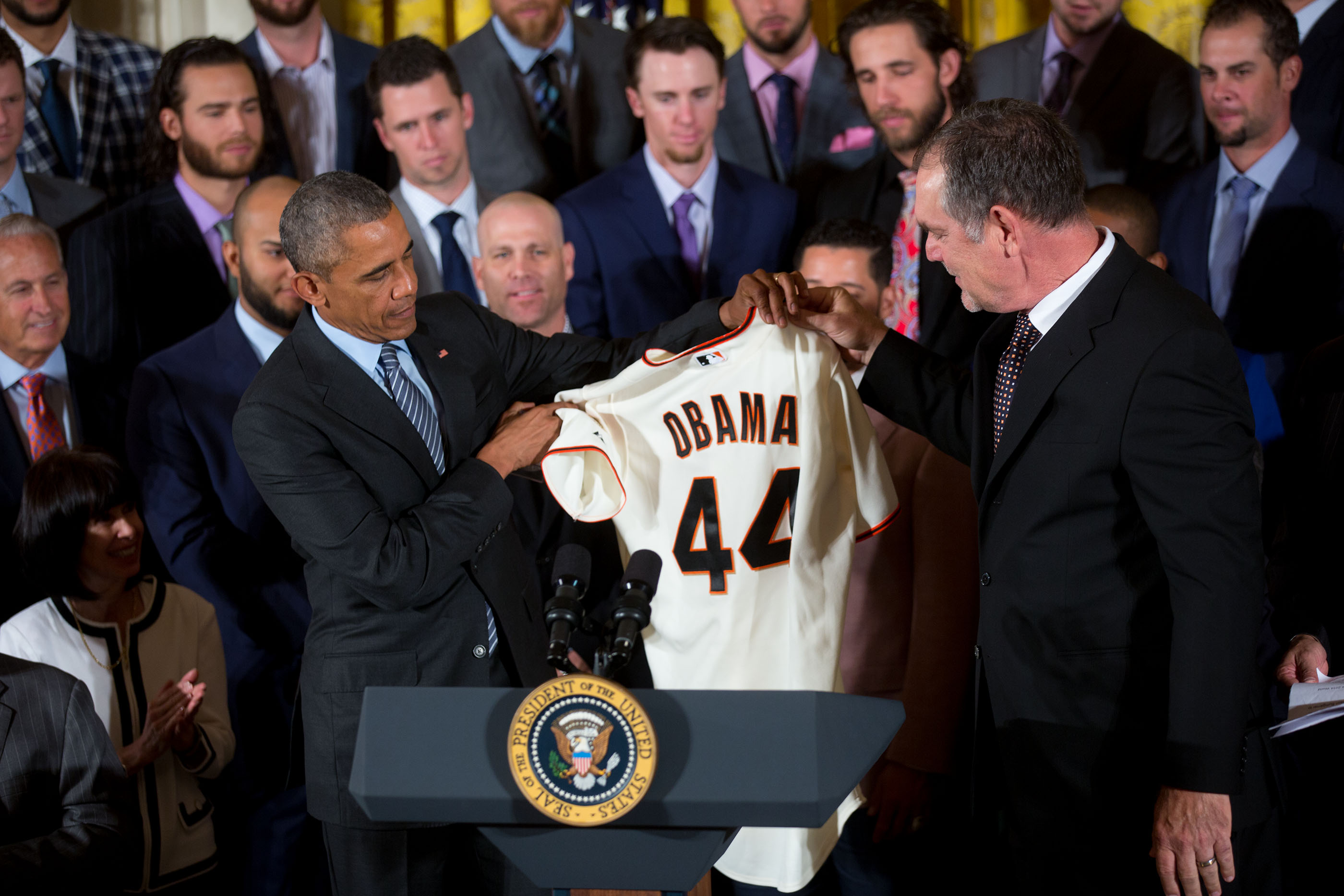
Posey with the Giants inside the White House being honored by President Barack Obama during a ceremony honoring the team's 2014 World Series championship

The Giants have not reissued Posey's number 28.

Championships
| Title | Times | Dates |
|---|---|---|
| National League champion | 3 | 2010, 2012, 2014 |
| World Series champion | 3 | 2010, 2012, 2014 |
| World Baseball Classic champion | 1 | 2017 |

Awards and Honors
| Name of award | Times | Dates |
|---|---|---|
| All-MLB Team | 1 | 2021 |
| American Baseball Coaches Association All America Team | 1 | 2008 |
| Atlantic Coast Conference Baseball Player of the Year | 1 | 2008 |
| Consensus All-America Team | 1 | 2008 |
| Baseball America College Player of the Year Award | 1 | 2008 |
| Bay Area Sports Hall of Fame | N/A | 2023 |
| Brooks Wallace Award | 1 | 2008 |
| Collegiate Baseball Newspaper All America Team | 1 | 2008 |
| Dick Howser Trophy | 1 | 2008 |
| Fielding Bible Award at catcher | 2 | 2015, 2016 |
| Florida State University Athletics Hall of Fame | N/A | 2018 |
| GIBBY/This Year in Baseball Awards for Best Rookie | 1 | 2010 |
| Golden Spikes Award | 1 | 2008 |
| Hank Aaron Award | 1 | 2012 |
| Johnny Bench Award; Renamed to Buster Posey Award in 2019. | 1 | 2008 |
| Lou Gehrig Memorial Award | 1 | 2019 |
| MLB All-Star | 7 | 2012, 2013, 2015, 2016, 2017, 2018, 2021 |
| MLB Player of the Month | 1 | July 2010 |
| MLB Player of the Week | 3 | July 11, 2010; June 30, 2013; September 7, 2014 |
| MLB Rookie of the Month | 1 | July 2010 |
| National Collegiate Baseball Writers Association All America Team | 1 | 2008 |
| National League Most Valuable Player | 1 | 2012 |
| National League Rookie of the Year | 1 | 2010 |
| Pepsi Clutch Performer of the Month | 1 | July 2010 |
| Players Choice Award for Outstanding Rookie | 1 | 2010 |
| Players Choice Award for Comeback Player | 2 | 2012, 2021 |
| Rawlings Gold Glove Award at catcher | 1 | 2016 |
| Silver Slugger Award at catcher | 5 | 2012, 2014, 2015, 2017, 2021 |
| The Sporting News Comeback Player of the Year Award | 2 | 2012, 2021 |
| Willie Mac Award | 1 | 2012 |
| Wilson Defensive Player of the Year Award | 2 | 2015, 2016 |

National League statistical leader
| Category | Times | Seasons |
|---|---|---|
| Batting champion | 1 | 2012 |
| OPS+ | 1 | 2012 |
| Wins Above Replacement | 1 | 2012 |

== Post-playing career ==
On May 7, 2022, at Oracle Park, the Giants organization, which ranged from alumni, coaches, executives, and former players, honored Posey in a pregame ceremony. Posey was also surrounded by his family. "Buster Posey Day" was broadcast live on local television on NBC Sports Bay Area. On September 21, 2022, the Giants announced that Posey had joined the 30-member ownership group of the Giants and served on its board of directors.

On September 4, 2024, third baseman Matt Chapman finalized a six-year, $151 million contract to stay with the Giants. Posey was active in finalizing the deal during the end of the 2024 season, having led contract negotiations. On September 30, 2024, the Giants announced that Posey will be their new president of baseball operations following the firing of Farhan Zaidi.

== Personal life ==
Posey married his wife, Kristen, in 2009. They had twins (a son and a daughter) in 2011. They adopted twin girls in 2020. Posey and his family lived in the East Bay during his career. After announcing his retirement, Posey and his wife sold their East Bay home and moved back to their home state of Georgia to be closer to their relatives, but then had a change of heart and returned to the Bay Area less than two years later. Posey is a Methodist Christian and served as the baseball chapel representative for the Giants. Posey's younger sister, Samantha, played softball for Valdosta State University.

=== Philanthropy ===
In 2016, Posey and his wife Kristen started the BP28 Foundation, focusing on helping pediatric cancer patients and raising funds for research and treatment. They have partnered with the V Foundation.

In 2019, Posey was named the recipient of the Lou Gehrig Memorial Award.

== See also ==
- List of Florida State University people
- List of Major League Baseball career games played as a catcher leaders
- List of Major League Baseball career putouts as a catcher leaders
- List of Major League Baseball players who spent their entire career with one franchise
