= Josh Fields (pitcher) =

American baseball player (born 1985)

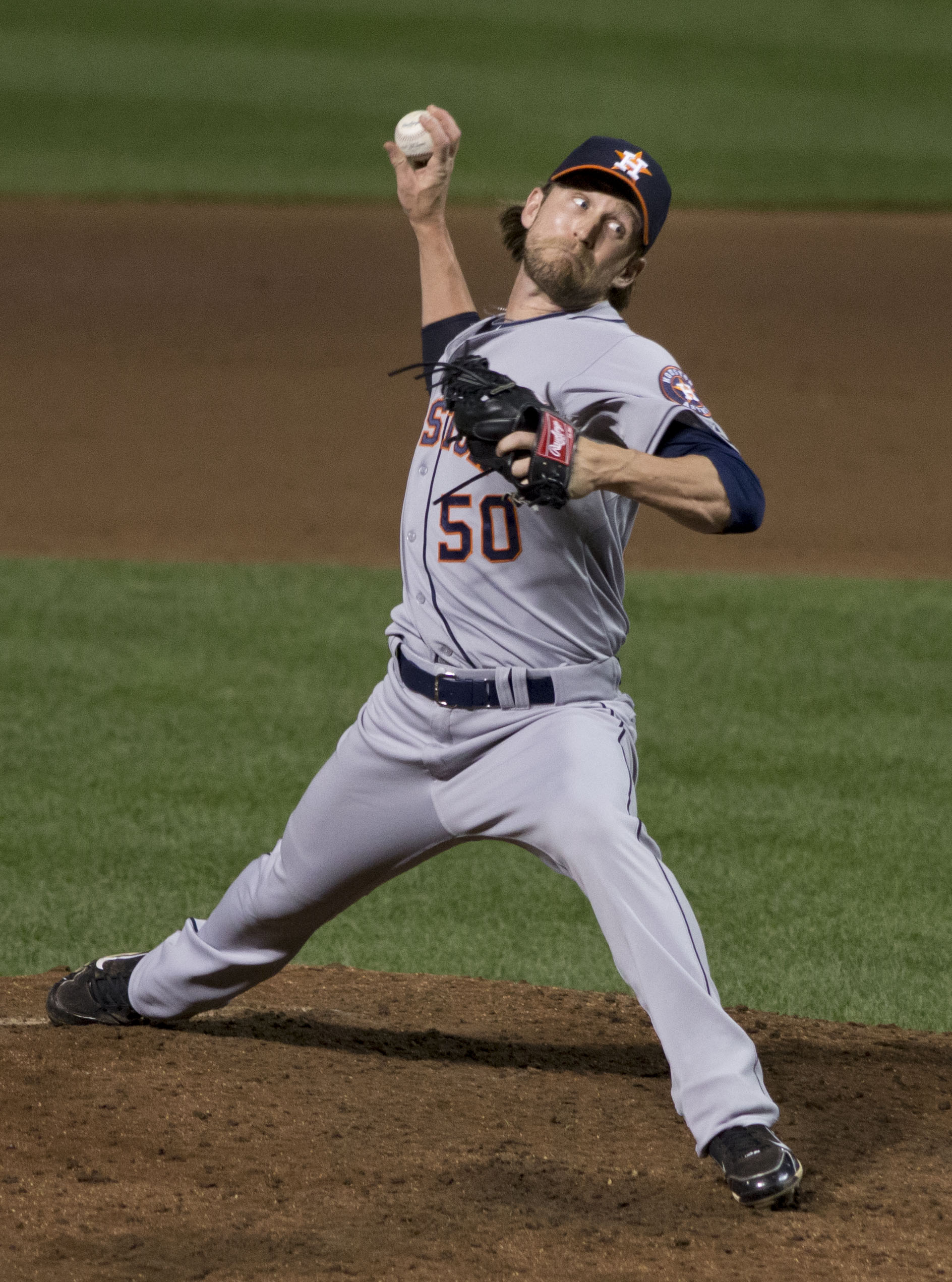
- Fields with the Houston Astros in 2013
- Relief pitcher
- Born: August 19, 1985 (age 40); Hull, Georgia, U.S.
- Batted: Right Threw: Right

MLB debut
- April 2, 2013, for the Houston Astros

Last MLB appearance
- September 26, 2018, for the Los Angeles Dodgers

MLB statistics
- Win–loss record: 17–12
- Earned run average: 3.71
- Strikeouts: 312
- Stats at Baseball Reference

Teams
- Houston Astros (2013–2016); Los Angeles Dodgers (2016–2018)

Joshua David Fields (born August 19, 1985) is an American former professional baseball pitcher. He played in Major League Baseball (MLB) for the Houston Astros and Los Angeles Dodgers.

== Amateur career ==
=== High school ===
Fields attended Prince Avenue Christian School in Bogart, Georgia. His junior season in 2003 he was 10–1 with 114 strikeouts in 58 1/3 innings pitched and also batted .632 with 18 homers and 53 RBI, earning him the Athens Banner-Herald Northeast Georgia Player of the Year honors. The following season, he ranked 36th in Baseball America's Top 100 Prep Prospects list while having a 6–0 record and 1.25 ERA with 80 strikeouts in 36 innings. He also batted .500, scored 35 runs and was successful in 31 of 32 stolen base attempts to win team MVP honors.

=== Georgia Bulldogs ===
Fields attended the University of Georgia, where he played for the baseball team. In 2005, as a freshman, he appeared in 17 games with a 3–1 record and 7.00 ERA and 49 strikeouts. He was selected to the Southeastern Conference All-Freshman team and made school history when he struck out the first eight batters he faced against Winthrop on May 18. In 2006, he appeared in 35 games with a 3–2 record and 1.80 ERA with 56 strikeouts against only 11 walks. He also had 15 saves. In the 2006 College World Series he pitched two scoreless innings. He was named a second-team All-American, first-time All-SEC and was a finalist for NCBWA Stopper of the Year. In 2006, he played collegiate summer baseball in the Cape Cod Baseball League for the Yarmouth-Dennis Red Sox where he was named the league's Outstanding Relief Pitcher.

In his junior season in 2007, Fields appeared in 26 games with a 1–6 record, 4.46 ERA, 45 strikeouts and seven saves. Despite developing some mechanical problems that hurt his stats, he was selected by the Atlanta Braves in the second round of the 2007 draft. He did not sign and chose to return to school for his senior season.

As a senior in 2008, Fields was 3–2 with a 3.38 ERA, 63 strikeouts and 18 saves in 36 games. He did not allow an earned run in his first 23 2/3 innings. The Bulldogs won the SEC Championship and advanced to the 2008 College World Series, where they finished as the runner-up to Fresno State. Fields was honored as SEC Pitcher of the Year, 1st team All-SEC, 1st Team All-American and won the Stopper of the Year Award. His 41 career saves are the most in SEC history and he was also a finalist for the Clemens Award.

== Professional career ==
=== Seattle Mariners ===
The Seattle Mariners selected Fields in the first round, with the 20th overall pick, in the 2008 Major League Baseball draft. He agreed to terms with the Mariners on February 13, 2009, after a lengthy negotiation period between the team and his advisor, Scott Boras. His eventual signing bonus was $1.75 million. He made his professional debut with the West Tenn Diamond Jaxx of the Southern League on April 9, allowing three runs while retiring only two batters. He pitched in 31 games with a 2–2 record and 6.48 ERA that season despite being shut down in May for a brief period with a "dead arm" that was attributed to his long layoff between the draft and signing. After the season, he was assigned to the Peoria Javelinas of the Arizona Fall League, where he allowed only two earned runs in 11 innings and was selected to the "Rising Stars Game" featuring the top prospects in the league.

Fields returned to the Diamond Jaxx for the 2010 season and was 1–1 with a 3.77 ERA in 21 appearances, which included six saves. He again played for Peoria after the season and made his second straight appearance in the "Rising Stars Game." In 2011, he was assigned to the Jackson Generals (the new name for the Diamond Jaxx) where he was 1–2 with a 3.81 ERA in 20 games. On July 1, he was promoted to the Triple-A Tacoma Rainiers of the Pacific Coast League, where he allowed 10 earned runs in 13 innings of work.

=== Boston Red Sox ===
On July 31, 2011, Fields was traded to the Boston Red Sox (along with Érik Bédard) in a three-team transaction that sent Trayvon Robinson and Chih-Hsien Chiang to the Mariners, and Tim Federowicz, Stephen Fife and Juan Rodriguez to the Los Angeles Dodgers The Red Sox assigned him to the Portland Sea Dogs of the Eastern League, where he pitched 17 1/3 innings in nine games and allowed six earned runs.

Fields began the 2012 season with Portland, where he was 3–3 with a 2.62 ERA in 32 games and recorded eight saves. He credited some changes made to his delivery with his improved numbers this season. He was promoted to the Triple-A Pawtucket Red Sox of the International League on August 5, where he pitched 13 2/3 scoreless innings over 10 games. He recorded the save in the deciding game of the International League Championship Series for Pawtucket.

Following the 2012 season, he pitched for Águilas Cibaeñas in the Dominican Winter League, allowing eight runs in six innings over eight games.

=== Houston Astros ===
The Houston Astros acquired Fields from the Red Sox as the first pick of the 2012 Rule 5 draft. He made his major league debut on April 2, 2013, against the Texas Rangers. He faced one batter, Craig Gentry, in the top of the eighth inning and struck him out swinging. He recorded his first major league win on July 23 against the Oakland Athletics with one scoreless inning of relief and his first save on August 5 against the Red Sox. Overall, he appeared in 41 games, pitched 38 innings and was 1–3 with a 4.97 ERA and five saves.

Fields remained on the Astros roster for the 2013 season. He struck out seven consecutive batters across two appearances in July, one short of the franchise record. In 54 games, he had a 4–6 record, a 4.45 ERA and saved four games. The following season, in 2015, he pitched in another 54 games with a 4–1 record and 3.55 ERA and led all Astros relievers in strikeouts per nine innings (11.90). In 2016, he began the season with the Astros but allowed 12 earned runs in 19 1/3 innings leading to his demotion to the Fresno Grizzlies of the Pacific Coast League on May 12. In 23 games for the Grizzlies, he allowed only five runs in 27 1/3 innings for a 1.65 ERA.

=== Los Angeles Dodgers ===
On August 1, 2016, Fields was traded to the Los Angeles Dodgers in exchange for minor league infielder Yordan Alvarez. In 22 games, he pitched 19 1/3 innings and allowed only six earned runs for a 2.79 ERA. He did not allow any runs in 2 1/3 innings in the playoffs for the Dodgers. He signed a $1.05 million contract for 2017, avoiding salary arbitration.

Fields struggled with his fastball velocity in spring training in 2017 and was optioned to the Triple-A Oklahoma City Dodgers to begin the season. However, he was added to the active roster a few days later when Rich Hill was placed on the disabled list. He pitched in 57 games for the Dodgers and was 5–0 with a 2.84 ERA. Fields pitched in four games in the postseason for the Dodgers. In Game Two of the 2017 NLDS against the Diamondbacks, he faced two batters in the top of the eighth inning, striking out J. D. Martinez before allowing a double to Daniel Descalso. In two appearances in the 2017 NLCS vs the Cubs, he retired Javier Báez on a flyball to center field in Game Two and Kris Bryant on a ground-out to second base in Game Four. Fields made one appearance in the 2017 World Series against the Astros. In Game Two, he entered the game in the top of the 10th inning and allowed back-to-back home runs to Jose Altuve and Carlos Correa followed by a double to Yuli Gurriel. He was removed from the game without recording an out.

Fields signed a one-year, $2.2 million, contract with the Dodgers for 2018, avoiding arbitration. He made 45 appearances with the Dodgers in 2018, with a 2.20 ERA but did not make the Dodgers post-season roster.

On March 7, 2019, Fields was designated for assignment by the Dodgers. He was released three days later.

=== Milwaukee Brewers ===
On March 20, 2019, Fields signed a minor league contract with the Milwaukee Brewers. In eight appearances for the Triple-A Nashville Sounds, he struggled to an 8.22 ERA with five strikeouts and three saves across 7 2/3 innings pitched. Fields opted out of his contract and became a free agent on April 30.

=== Texas Rangers ===
On May 10, 2019, Fields signed a minor league contract with the Texas Rangers, and was assigned to the Nashville Sounds. With a 5.82 ERA and 19 strikeouts over 17 innings, he was released on June 29.

== See also ==
- Rule 5 draft results
