= Chris Hernandez =

American baseball player

Medal record

Men's baseball

Representing United States

Haarlem Baseball Week
Gold medal – first place	2008 Haarlem	Team

World University Baseball Championship
Gold medal – first place	2008 Brno	Team

Christopher Hernandez (born August 5, 1999) is an American former professional baseball pitcher.

== Early life and college career ==
Hernandez was born in Miami, Florida and attended Monsignor Pace High School, out of which he was drafted by the Detroit Tigers in the 14th round of the 2007 Major League Baseball draft (a couple picks ahead of pitcher Robert Carson), though he opted not to sign. Instead, he attended the University of Miami. In his freshman year at the school, Hernandez went 11-0 with 117 strikeouts, 92 hits allowed, 18 walks allowed, a 0.98 WHIP and a 2.72 ERA in 112.2 innings to earn the Collegiate Baseball Newspaper Freshman Pitcher of the Year and the Baseball America Freshman of the Year honors. He was also named a Louisville Slugger First Team All-American, the conference Freshman of the Year, a Roger Clemens Award finalist, to the Brooks Wallace Award watch list, first team All-Atlantic Coast Conference, to the ACC Championship All-Tournament Team, a Louisville Slugger Freshman All-American, a National Collegiate Baseball Writers Association Freshman All-American, a Baseball America and a Rivals.com Second Team All-American. He also played in the College World Series that year. The next year, he was 7-5 with a 4.76 ERA, 93 strikeouts and 31 walks in 90.2 innings. In 2010, he went 10-3 with a 2.64 ERA, 110 strikeouts, 87 hits, 35 walks and a 1.15 WHIP in 105.2 innings. He led the ACC in ERA.

He also played for the United States national baseball team in 2008 and participated in the 2008 Haarlem Baseball Week and 2008 World University Baseball Championship.

== Professional career ==
He was drafted by the Boston Red Sox in the 7th round of the 2010 Major League Baseball draft, one pick ahead of pitcher Josh Osich, and was signed by scout Laz Gutierrez. He played a game for the Lowell Spinners that year to begin his professional career. In 2011, he was 10-7 with a 3.18 ERA in 25 games for the Salem Red Sox to earn Carolina League Mid-Season All-Star and MiLB.com Organization All-Star honors. In 2012, he was 5-12 with a 3.26 mark in 146.1 innings between the Portland Sea Dogs and Triple-A Pawtucket Red Sox. He was an Eastern League Mid-Season All-Star that year. In 2013, again between Portland and Pawtucket, he was 5-9 with a 4.72 ERA and in 2014, with Pawtucket, he was 5-9 with a 4.08 ERA. He helped Pawtucket win two International League championships in 2012 and 2014.

Overall, he was 25-37 with a 3.80 ERA in 114 games (88 starts) in his professional career. He had played in major league spring training in both 2013 and 2014.
