= 1998 College Baseball All-America Team =

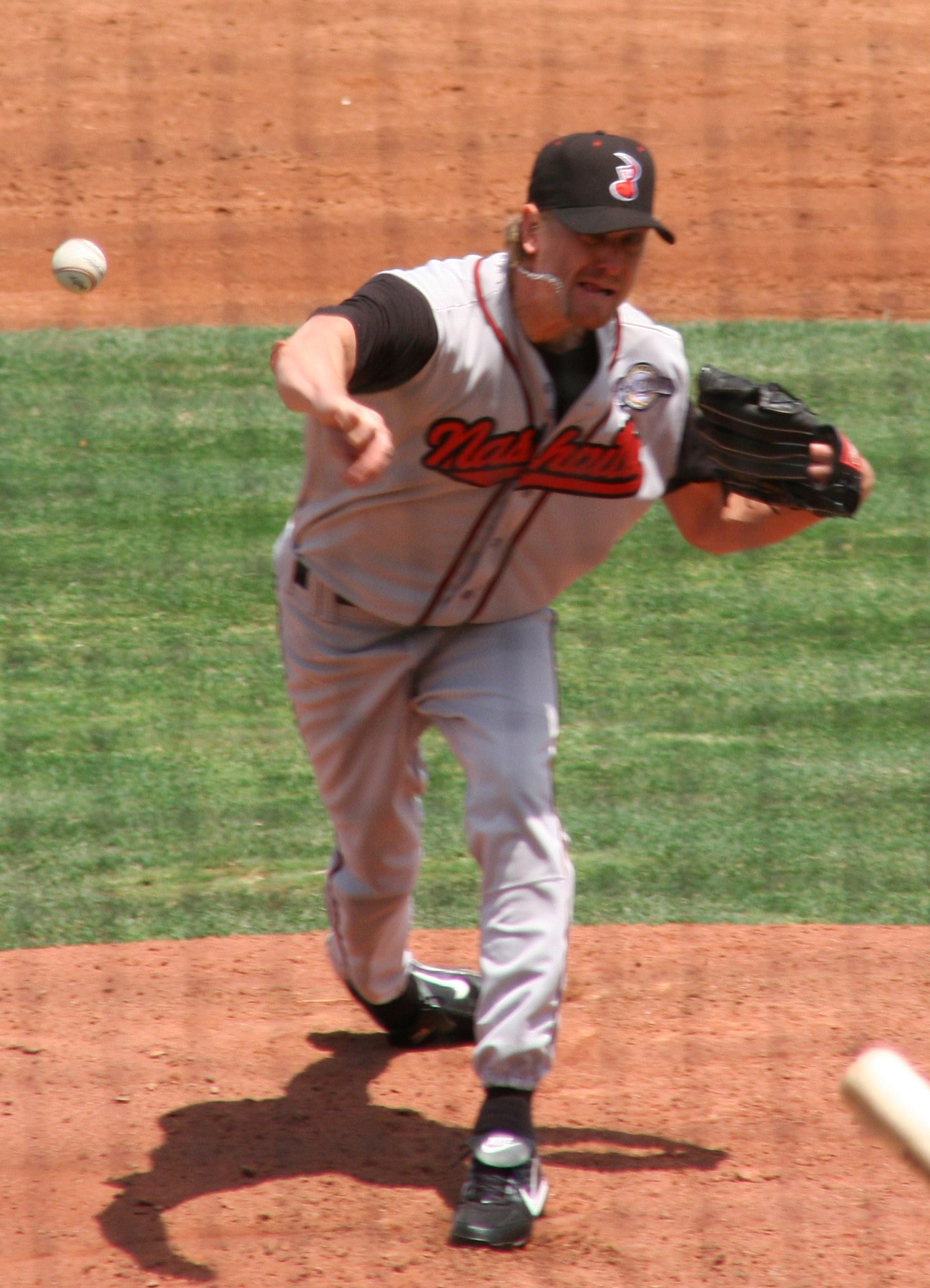
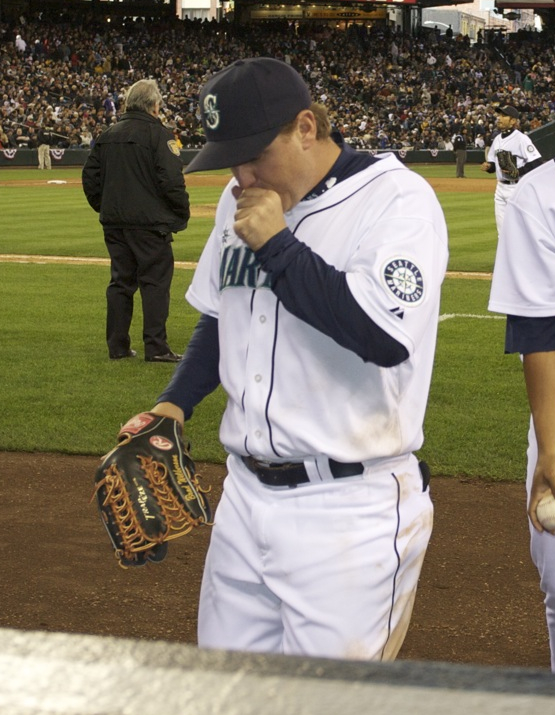
1998 All-Americans included 2006 World Series champion Jeff Weaver (left) and National College Baseball Hall of Fame Inductee Brad Wilkerson (right).

This is a list of college baseball players named first team All-Americans for the 1998 NCAA Division I baseball season. In 1998, there were six generally recognized All-America selectors for baseball: the American Baseball Coaches Association, Baseball America, the Collegiate Baseball Newspaper, the National Collegiate Baseball Writers Association, The Sporting News, and USA Today Baseball Weekly. In order to be considered a "consensus" All-American, a player must have been selected by at least four of these.

== Key ==
A	American Baseball Coaches Association
B	Baseball America
C	Collegiate Baseball Newspaper
N	National Collegiate Baseball Writers Association
S	The Sporting News
U	USA Today Baseball Weekly
	Member of the National College Baseball Hall of Fame
	Consensus All-American – selected by all six organizations
	Consensus All-American – selected by four organizations

== All-Americans ==
Position	Name	School	#	A	B	C	N	S	U	Other awards and honors
Starting pitcher	Jeff Austin	Stanford	5	—	✓	✓	✓	✓	✓	Baseball America Player of the Year
Starting pitcher	Chuck Crowder	Georgia Tech	1	—	—	—	—	✓	—	
Starting pitcher	Seth Etherton	USC	6	✓	✓	✓	✓	✓	✓	The Sporting News Player of the Year
Starting pitcher	Mike Fischer	South Alabama	2	✓	✓	—	—	—	—	
Starting pitcher	John Hendricks	Wake Forest	1	—	—	—	✓	—	—	
Starting pitcher	Jason Jennings	Baylor	2	—	—	—	✓	✓	—	
Starting pitcher	Ryan Rupe	Texas A&M	1	—	—	—	✓	—	—	
Starting pitcher	Alex Santos	Miami (FL)	5	✓	✓	—	✓	✓	✓	
Starting pitcher	Jeff Weaver	Fresno State	2	—	—	✓	✓	—	—	
Starting pitcher	Shane Wright	Texas Tech	3	✓	—	✓	✓	—	—	
Relief pitcher	Josh Fogg	Florida	3	—	✓	✓	✓	—	—	
Relief pitcher	Jack Krawczyk	USC	5	✓	—	✓	✓	✓	✓	
Catcher	Josh Bard	Texas Tech	2	✓	—	—	✓	—	—	
Catcher	Brad Cresse	LSU	1	—	—	—	—	✓	—	
Catcher	Jeremy Salazar	Florida State	1	—	—	—	✓	—	—	
Catcher	Sammy Serrano	Stetson	4	—	✓	✓	✓	—	✓	
First baseman	Eddy Furniss	LSU	5	✓	✓	✓	✓	✓	—	Dick Howser Trophy
Second baseman	Xavier Nady	California	1	—	—	—	✓	—	—	
Second baseman	Jeff Pickler	Tennessee	6	✓	✓	✓	✓	✓	✓	
Shortstop	Adam Everett	South Carolina	1	—	✓	—	—	—	—	
Shortstop	Bobby Hill	Miami (FL)	1	—	—	—	✓	—	—	
Shortstop	Brian Roberts	North Carolina	1	—	—	—	✓	—	—	
Shortstop / DH	Damon Thames	Rice	6	✓	✓	✓	✓	✓	✓	ABCA Player of the Year
Third baseman	Andrew Beinbrink	Arizona State	1	—	—	—	✓	—	—	
Third baseman	Pat Burrell	Miami (FL)	1	—	—	—	✓	—	—	Golden Spikes Award First overall pick in the 1998 MLB draft
Third baseman	Paul Day	Long Beach State	4	—	—	✓	✓	✓	✓	
Third baseman	Aubrey Huff	Miami (FL)	2	—	✓	—	✓	—	—	
Third baseman	Bo Robinson	Charlotte	1	✓	—	—	—	—	—	
Outfielder	Brian Cox	Florida State	1	✓	—	—	—	—	—	
Outfielder	Bubba Crosby	Rice	4	✓	✓	—	✓	—	✓	
Outfielder	Mike Curry	South Carolina	1	—	✓	—	—	—	—	
Outfielder	James Matan	Charlotte	2	—	—	—	✓	✓	—	
Outfielder	Kevin Mench	Delaware	5	✓	—	✓	✓	✓	✓	Collegiate Baseball Player of the Year
Outfielder	Jeff Ryan	Wichita State	5	✓	—	✓	✓	✓	✓	
Outfielder	Eric Valent	UCLA	3	—	✓	✓	✓	—	—	
Outfielder	Brian Wiese	Mississippi State	1	—	—	—	✓	—	—	
Designated hitter / 1B	Pat Magness	Wichita State	5	✓	—	✓	✓	✓	✓	
Utility player	Brandon Inge	VCU	1	✓	—	—	—	—	—	
Utility player	Brad Wilkerson	Florida	5	—	✓	✓	✓	✓	✓	Rotary Smith Award

== See also ==
- List of college baseball awards
