= USC Trojans baseball statistical leaders =

The USC Trojans baseball statistical leaders are individual statistical leaders of the USC Trojans baseball program in various categories, including batting average, home runs, runs batted in, runs, hits, stolen bases, ERA, and Strikeouts. Within those areas, the lists identify single-game, single-season, and career leaders. The Trojans represent the University of Southern California in the NCAA's Big Ten Conference.

USC began competing in intercollegiate baseball in 1889. These lists are updated through the end of the 2025 season.

== Batting Average ==
Career (min 300 AB, 2 seasons played)
Rk	Player	AVG	Seasons
1	Steve Kemp	.397	1973 1974 1975
2	Hal Charnofsky	.376	1951 1952
	Rich Dauer	.376	1973 1974
4	Geoff Jenkins	.369	1993 1994 1995
5	Tony Santino	.362	1954 1955 1956
6	Willie Ryan	.360	1960 1961 1962
7	Grant Green	.359	2007 2008 2009
8	Jacque Jones	.355	1994 1995 1996
9	Eric Munson	.354	1997 1998 1999
10	Bob Levingston	.347	1960 1961 1962
	Tim Steele	.347	1971 1972

Season (min 2 AB per games played)
Rk	Player	AVG	Season
1	Steve Kemp	.435	1975
2	John Werhas	.419	1959
3	Scott Sommers	.409	1986
4	Casey Burrill	.408	1993
5	Tim Tolman	.404	1978
	Len Gabrielson	.404	1959
	Ed Simpson	.404	1953
8	Geoff Jenkins	.399	1995
9	Bill Heath	.396	1958
10	Tony Santino	.393	1955

== Home Runs ==
Career
Rk	Player	HR	Seasons
1	Mark McGwire	54	1982 1983 1984
2	Jeff Clement	46	2003 2004 2005
3	Geoff Jenkins	45	1993 1994 1995
4	Eric Munson	43	1997 1998 1999
5	Morgan Ensberg	40	1995 1996 1997 1998
	Ricky Oropesa	40	2009 2010 2011
7	Jason Lane	34	1998 1999
8	Mike Robertson	33	1989 1990 1991
	Joey Metropoulos	33	2002 2003 2004
10	Pat Harrison	32	1966 1967 1968
	Brad Ticehurst	32	1996 1997 1998 1999

Season
Rk	Player	HR	Season
1	Mark McGwire	32	1984
2	Jim Campanis	23	1988
	Geoff Jenkins	23	1995
4	Morgan Ensberg	21	1998
	Jeff Clement	21	2003
6	Jason Lane	20	1999
	Ricky Oropesa	20	2010
8	Mark McGwire	19	1983
	Augie Lopez	19	2026
10	Brad Ticehurst	18	1998
	Justin Gemoll	18	2000
	Beau Craig	18	2000

Single Game
Rk	Player	HR	Season	Opponent
1	Several	3	Most recent: Ricky Oropesa, 2010 vs. Washington	

== Runs Batted In ==
Career
Rk	Player	RBI	Seasons
1	Geoff Jenkins	175	1993 1994 1995
2	Mark Smith	166	1989 1990 1991
3	Gabe Alvarez	163	1993 1994 1995
4	Bret Boone	160	1988 1989 1990
5	Michael Moon	155	2001 2002 2003 2004
6	Jacque Jones	154	1994 1995 1996
7	Timmy Robinson	152	2013 2014 2015 2016
8	Mark McGwire	150	1982 1983 1984
	Jeff Clement	150	2003 2004 2005
10	Pat Harrison	149	1966 1967 1968
	Morgan Ensberg	149	1995 1996 1997 1998

Season
Rk	Player	RBI	Season
1	Jim Campanis	92	1988
	Rich Dauer	92	1974
3	Mark Smith	80	1991
	Mark McGwire	80	1984
5	Robb Gorr	79	1998
6	Geoff Jenkins	78	1995
7	Jeff Inglin	72	1996
8	Bill Peavey	71	2002
9	Morgan Ensberg	69	1998
10	Jason Lane	68	1999

Single Game
Rk	Player	RBI	Season	Opponent
	Ron Fairly	8	1958	UCLA
	Rich Dauer	8	1974	Pepperdine
	Steve Kemp	8	1975	San Francisco
	Jeff Inglin	8	1996	Arizona State

== Runs ==
Career
Rk	Player	R	Seasons
1	Seth Davidson	201	1998 1999 2000 2001
2	Anthony Lunetta	197	2000 2001 2002 2003
3	Murph Proctor	187	1988 1989 1990 1991
4	Geoff Jenkins	180	1993 1994 1995
5	Michael Moon	177	2001 2002 2003 2004
6	Walter Dawkins	175	1992 1993 1994 1995
	Morgan Ensberg	175	1995 1996 1997 1998
8	Brian Barre	174	1999 2000 2001 2002
9	Mark Smith	169	1989 1990 1991
10	Bret Boone	166	1988 1989 1990

Season
Rk	Player	R	Season
1	Rich Dauer	75	1974
	Mark McGwire	75	1984
	Geoff Jenkins	75	1995
	Brian Barre	75	2002
5	Morgan Ensberg	74	1998
6	Gabe Alvarez	73	1995
7	Mark Smith	72	1991
8	Jeff Cirillo	70	1991
9	Adrian Lopez	68	2026
10	Bret Barberie	67	1988

Single Game
Rk	Player	R	Season	Opponent
1	Bret Barberie	6	1988	UC Riverside
2	Several	5	Most recent: J.P. Roberge, 1994 vs. UNC Greensboro	

== Hits ==
Career
Rk	Player	H	Seasons
1	Seth Davidson	312	1998 1999 2000 2001
2	Anthony Lunetta	290	2000 2001 2002 2003
3	Murph Proctor	282	1988 1989 1990 1991
4	Michael Moon	270	2001 2002 2003 2004
5	Jacque Jones	268	1994 1995 1996
6	Gabe Alvarez	258	1993 1994 1995
7	Geoff Jenkins	251	1993 1994 1995
8	Mark Smith	240	1989 1990 1991
9	Walter Dawkins	238	1992 1993 1994 1995
10	Wes Rachels	237	1995 1996 1997 1998

Season
Rk	Player	H	Season
1	Rich Dauer	108	1974
2	Jacque Jones	106	1995
3	Geoff Jenkins	103	1995
4	Jeff Cirillo	100	1991
5	Gabe Alvarez	97	1995
	Casey Burrill	97	1993
7	Robb Gorr	96	1998
	Walter Dawkins	96	1995
	Mark McGwire	96	1984
10	Jacque Jones	93	1996

Single Game
Rk	Player	H	Season	Opponent
1	Morgan Ensberg	6	1997	UC Santa Barbara
2	several	5	Most recent: Walter Urbon, 2026 vs. Lamar	

== Stolen Bases ==
Career
Rk	Player	SB	Seasons
1	Seth Davidson	66	1998 1999 2000 2001
2	Mark Smith	57	1989 1990 1991
3	John Jackson	54	1987 1988 1989 1990
4	Damon Buford	53	1988 1989 1990
5	John Wells	50	1976 1977 1978 1979
6	Brian Barre	47	1999 2000 2001 2002
7	Cal Meier	44	1968 1969 1970
8	J.P. Roberge	43	1992 1993 1994
	Morgan Ensberg	43	1995 1996 1997 1998
10	Don Buford Jr.	41	1986 1987
	Wes Rachels	41	1995 1996 1997 1998

Season
Rk	Player	SB	Season
1	Aaron Boone	26	1994
	Seth Davidson	26	2000
3	Don Buford Jr.	24	1987
4	Damon Buford	23	1990
5	Mark Smith	22	1990
	Billy Morris	22	1992
7	John Jackson	21	1989
8	Cal Meier	20	1970
	Morgan Ensberg	20	1998
	Brian Barre	20	2001

Single Game
Rk	Player	SB	Season	Opponent
1	J.P. Roberge	4	1993	Chapman
2	several times	3	Most recent: Ethan Hedges, 2025 vs. UConn	

== Earned Run Average ==
Career (min 100 IP)
Rk	Player	ERA	Seasons
1	John Stewart	1.81	1965 1966
2	Walt Peterson	1.92	1963 1964
	Bill Lee	1.92	1966 1967 1968
4	Al Meyer	1.93	1973 1974 1975
5	Mark Sogge	2.02	1970 1971 1972
6	Bob Vaughn	2.05	1967 1968
7	Steve Busby	2.24	1970 1971
8	Jim Barr	2.31	1968 1969 1970
9	Brent Strom	2.32	1968 1969 1970
10	Russ McQueen	2.35	1971 1972 1973 1974

Season (min 1 IP per game)
Rk	Player	ERA	Season
1	Greg Widman	1.16	1970
2	Bob Vaughn	1.23	1968
3	Pete Redfern	1.24	1975
4	Dave Kingman	1.38	1969
5	Tom House	1.43	1967
6	Bill Thom	1.44	1959
7	Brent Strom	1.47	1969
8	Ron Cook	1.52	1966
9	Walt Peterson	1.54	1964
10	Bill Lee	1.63	1967

== Strikeouts ==
Career
Rk	Player	K	Seasons
1	Rik Currier	449	1998 1999 2000 2001
2	Seth Etherton	420	1995 1996 1997 1998
3	Ian Kennedy	380	2004 2005 2006
4	Brent Strom	363	1968 1969 1970
5	Mark Prior	352	2000 2001
6	Randy Flores	316	1994 1995 1996 1997
7	Randy Powers	312	1987 1988 1989 1990
8	Walt Peterson	288	1963 1964
9	Jim Barr	286	1968 1969 1970
10	Bruce Gardner	281	1958 1959 1960

Season
Rk	Player	K	Season
1	Mark Prior	202	2001
2	Seth Etherton	182	1998
3	Walt Peterson	172	1963
4	Mason Edwards	169	2026
5	Ian Kennedy	158	2005
6	Mark Prior	150	2000
7	Brent Strom	147	1968
8	Barry Zito	146	1999
9	Mike Adamson	143	1967
10	Rik Currier	141	2000

Single Game
Rk	Player	K	Season	Opponent
1	Dale Zeigler	21	1957	Fresno State
2	John Herbst	17	1965	UC Santa Barbara
3	Barry Zito	16	1999	Oregon State
	Barry Zito	16	1999	Arizona
	Barry Zito	16	1999	UCLA
	Mason Edwards	16	2026	Iowa
