= 1998 NCAA Division I baseball tournament =

- Season: 1998
- Teams: 48
- Finals site: Johnny Rosenblatt Stadium; Omaha, Nebraska
- Champions: Southern California (12th title)
- Runner-up: Arizona State (18th CWS Appearance)
- Winning coach: Mike Gillespie (1st title)
- MOP: Wes Rachels (Southern California)

The 1998 NCAA Division I baseball tournament was played at the end of the 1998 NCAA Division I baseball season to determine the national champion of college baseball. The tournament concluded with eight teams competing in the College World Series, a double-elimination tournament in its fifty-second year. Eight regional competitions were held to determine the participants in the final event. Each region was composed of six teams, resulting in 48 teams participating in the tournament at the conclusion of their regular season, and in some cases, after a conference tournament. The fifty-second tournament's champion was Southern California, coached by Mike Gillespie. The championship was the Trojans' record 12th, but their first since 1978, the last under coach Rod Dedeaux. The Most Outstanding Player was USC second baseman Wes Rachels.

== Regionals ==
The opening rounds of the tournament were played at eight regional sites across the country, each consisting of a six-team field. Each regional tournament is double-elimination, however region brackets are variable depending on the number of teams remaining after each round. Regional games were scheduled for Thursday, May 21 through Sunday, May 24; however, one final Sunday game (Arizona State vs. Georgia Tech at Wichita) had to be played the next day due to rainout. The winners of each regional advanced to the College World Series.

In the final year of the 48-team tournament, six regionals required the full 11 games. Only Florida State and LSU advanced to the CWS unscathed, while Long Beach State won four games over three days after losing their first to North Carolina St.
Bold indicates winner.

=== East Regional at Clemson, SC ===
May 21
1 | **Southern California** | **10**
6 | Fordham | 6
2 | **Clemson** | **12**
5 | The Citadel | 3
3 | VCU | 1
4 | **South Alabama** | **2**

May 22–23
1 | Southern California | 4
3 | **VCU** | **14**
5 | **The Citadel** | **5**
6 | Fordham | 1
2 | Clemson | 1
4 | **South Alabama** | **2**^{16}
1 | **Southern California** | **8**
2 | Clemson | 5

May 23
3 | **VCU** | **3**
5 | The Citadel | 2
4 | South Alabama | 2
1 | **Southern California** | **3**

May 24
3 | VCU | 0
4 | **South Alabama** | **6**

May 24
4 | South Alabama | 3
1 | **Southern California** | **4**

=== Atlantic I Regional at Coral Gables, FL ===
May 21
1 | **Miami (FL)** | **21**
6 | Bowling Green | 6
2 | **South Carolina** | **21**
5 | FIU | 9
3 | North Carolina | 2
4 | **Texas Tech** | **6**

May 22–23
1 | Miami (FL) | 5
3 | **North Carolina** | **6**
5 | **FIU** | **13**
6 | Bowling Green | 7
2 | **South Carolina** | **9**
4 | Texas Tech | 8
1 | **Miami (FL)** | **13**
4 | Texas Tech | 0

May 23
3 | **North Carolina** | **8**
5 | FIU | 2
2 | South Carolina | 2
1 | **Miami (FL)** | **14**

May 24
3 | **North Carolina** | **4**
2 | South Carolina | 2

May 24
3 | North Carolina | 4
1 | **Miami (FL)** | **7**

=== Atlantic II Regional at Tallahassee, FL ===
May 21
1 | **Florida State** | **10**
6 | Liberty | 7
2 | Auburn | 15
5 | **Rutgers** | **17**
3 | Delaware | 3
4 | **Oklahoma** | **6**

May 22
1 | **Florida State** | **27**
3 | Delaware | 6
5 | Rutgers | 7
4 | **Oklahoma** | **9**
2 | **Auburn** | **3**
6 | Liberty | 2

May 23
1 | **Florida State** | **23**
4 | Oklahoma | 2
2 | **Auburn** | **7**
5 | Rutgers | 4

May 23
2 | **Auburn** | **9**
4 | Oklahoma | 8

May 24
1 | **Florida State** | **16** | —
2 | Auburn | 10 | —

=== Central Regional at College Station, TX ===
May 21
1 | **Rice** | **11**
6 | Oral Roberts | 1
2 | **Texas A&M** | **17**
5 | UNC Charlotte | 0
3 | Washington | 4
4 | **Mississippi State** | **7**

May 22–23
1 | Rice | 11
3 | **Washington** | **20**
5 | UNC Charlotte | 13
6 | **Oral Roberts** | **20**
2 | **Texas A&M** | **4**
4 | Mississippi State | 3
1 | Rice | 14
4 | **Mississippi State** | **15**

May 23
3 | **Washington** | **13**
6 | Oral Roberts | 6
2 | Texas A&M | 9
4 | **Mississippi State** | **10**

May 24
3 | Washington | 4
2 | **Texas A&M** | **6**

May 24
2 | Texas A&M | 5
4 | **Mississippi State** | **11**

=== Midwest Regional at Wichita, KS ===
May 21
1 | **Wichita State** | **7**
6 | SE Missouri State | 4
2 | Georgia Tech | 4
5 | **Oklahoma State** | **13**
3 | **Arizona State** | **8**
4 | Arkansas | 4

May 22–23
1 | Wichita State | 2
4 | **Arkansas** | **3**^{11}
2 | **Georgia Tech** | **14**
6 | SE Missouri State | 5
5 | **Oklahoma State** | **13**
3 | Arizona State | 8
1 | Wichita State | 4
3 | **Arizona State** | **6**

May 23
4 | Arkansas | 0
2 | **Georgia Tech** | **2**
5 | Oklahoma State | 5
3 | **Arizona State** | **13**

May 24
2 | **Georgia Tech** | **6**
5 | Oklahoma State | 5

May 25
2 | Georgia Tech | 1
3 | **Arizona State** | **3**

=== South I Regional at Gainesville, FL ===
May 21
1 | **Florida** | **12**
6 | Monmouth | 8
2 | **Wake Forest** | **14**
5 | Illinois | 12
3 | Baylor | 10
4 | **Richmond** | **12**

May 22–23
1 | Florida | 5
3 | **Baylor** | **10**
5 | **Illinois** | **12**
6 | Monmouth | 2
2 | **Wake Forest** | **6**
4 | Richmond | 5
1 | **Florida** | **15**
4 | Richmond | 3

May 23
3 | Baylor | 7
5 | **Illinois** | **8**^{13}
2 | Wake Forest | 9
1 | **Florida** | **12**

May 24
5 | **Illinois** | **13**
2 | Wake Forest | 4

May 24
5 | Illinois | 6
1 | **Florida** | **7**

=== South II Regional at Baton Rouge, LA ===
May 21
1 | **LSU** | **18**
6 | Nicholls State | 4
2 | **Cal State Fullerton** | **16**
5 | Harvard | 1
3 | **Tulane** | **11**
4 | SW Louisiana | 5

May 22
1 | **LSU** | **15**
4 | SW Louisiana | 6
2 | **Cal State Fullerton** | **10**
3 | Tulane | 6
5 | **Harvard** | **6**^{10}
6 | Nicholls State | 5

May 23
1 | **LSU** | **13**
2 | Cal State Fullerton | 11
5 | **Harvard** | **15**
3 | Tulane | 11

May 23
5 | Harvard | 3
2 | **Cal State Fullerton** | **11**

May 24
1 | **LSU** | **14** | —
2 | Cal State Fullerton | 3 | —

=== West Regional at Stanford, CA ===
May 21
1 | Stanford | 2
6 | **Loyola Marymount** | **6**
2 | **Alabama** | **8**
5 | Minnesota | 2
3 | Long Beach State | 3
4 | **NC State** | **12**

May 22–23
6 | Loyola Marymount | 9
3 | **Long Beach State** | **19**
1 | **Stanford** | **19**
5 | Minnesota | 1
2 | Alabama | 10
4 | **NC State** | **13**
2 | **Alabama** | **13**
6 | Loyola Marymount | 5

May 23
3 | **Long Beach State** | **5**
1 | Stanford | 1
4 | NC State | 2
2 | **Alabama** | **9**

May 24
3 | **Long Beach State** | **10**
4 | NC State | 6

May 24
3 | **Long Beach State** | **5**
2 | Alabama | 3

== College World Series ==
The 1998 CWS was infamous for producing several high-scoring games, which was termed by media covering the Series as "Gorilla Ball" (or "Geaux-rilla Ball" among LSU fans), which placed a premium on home runs. LSU, which won the 1996 and 1997 national championships and set an NCAA record in 1997 by hitting 188 home runs, hit eight home runs in its first game (by seven different players) vs. USC, and added six more in its second game vs. Mississippi State to bring its season total to 157. Needing one victory to advance to the championship game for the third consecutive year, LSU fell twice to USC, hitting just one home run in 18 innings. USC and Pac-10 rival Arizona St. set numerous offensive records in the championship game, won by the Trojans 21–14.

Prior to the 1999 season, the NCAA adopted restrictions on aluminum bats, requiring the difference between the length and weight ("drop") of the bat to be no more than three (e.g. a 34-inch bat could not weigh less than 31 ounces). This reduced home run output slightly, but it was not until more sweeping changes in 2011 before aluminum bats would perform more like their wood counterparts.

=== Participants ===
| Seeding | School | Conference | Record (conference) | Head coach | CWS appearances | CWS best finish | CWS record |
|---|---|---|---|---|---|---|---|
| 1 | Florida | SEC | 46–16 (21–8) | Andy Lopez | 3 (last: 1996) | 3rd (1991) | 5–6 |
| 2 | Miami (FL) | n/a | 50–10 (n/a) | Jim Morris | 16 (last: 1997) | 1st (1982, 1985) | 34–28 |
| 3 | Florida State | ACC | 53–18 (18–4) | Mike Martin | 15 (last: 1996) | 2nd (1970, 1986) | 19–30 |
| 4 | Southern California | Pac-10 | 44–16 (21–9) | Mike Gillespie | 18 (last: 1995) | 1st (1948, 1958, 1961, 1963, 1968, 1970, 1971, 1972, 1973, 1974, 1978) | 67–21 |
| 5 | LSU | SEC | 46–17 (21–9) | Skip Bertman | 9 (last: 1997) | 1st (1991, 1993, 1996, 1997) | 23–11 |
| 6 | Arizona State | Pac-10 | 38–22 (18–11) | Pat Murphy | 17 (last: 1994) | 1st (1965, 1967, 1969, 1977, 1981) | 52–29 |
| 7 | Long Beach State | Big West | 42–21–1 (23–7) | Dave Snow | 3 (last: 1993) | 3rd (1993) | 4–6 |
| 8 | Mississippi State | SEC | 41–21 (14–15) | Pat McMahon | 6 (last: 1997) | 3rd (1985) | 6–12 |

=== Results ===
==== Bracket ====
First round
1 | Florida | 13
8 | Mississippi State | 14
4 | Southern California | 10
5 | LSU | 12
1 | Florida | 10
4 | Southern California | 12^{11}
2 | Miami (FL) | 3
7 | Long Beach State | 1
3 | Florida State | 10
6 | Arizona State | 11
7 | Long Beach State | 7
3 | Florida State | 4

Second round
8 | Mississippi State | 8
5 | LSU | 10
8 | Mississippi State | 1
4 | Southern California | 7
2 | Miami (FL) | 2
6 | Arizona State | 9
2 | Miami (FL) | 3
7 | Long Beach State | 6

Semifinals
5 | LSU | 4 | 3
4 | Southern California | 5 | 7
6 | Arizona State | 14 | —
7 | Long Beach State | 4 | —

Finals
4 | Southern California | 21
6 | Arizona State | 14

==== Game results ====
| Date | Game | Winner | Score | Loser | Notes |
|---|---|---|---|---|---|
| May 29 | Game 1 | Arizona State | 11–10 | Florida State | |
| May 29 | Game 2 | Miami (FL) | 3–1 | Long Beach State | |
| May 30 | Game 3 | LSU | 12–10 | Southern California | |
| May 30 | Game 4 | Mississippi State | 14–13 | Florida | |
| May 31 | Game 5 | Arizona State | 9–2 | Miami (FL) | |
| May 31 | Game 6 | Long Beach State | 7–4 | Florida State | Florida State eliminated |
| June 1 | Game 7 | LSU | 10–8 | Mississippi State | |
| June 1 | Game 8 | Southern California | 12 – 10 (11 innings) | Florida | Florida eliminated |
| June 2 | Game 9 | Long Beach State | 6–3 | Miami (FL) | Miami (FL) eliminated |
| June 2 | Game 10 | Southern California | 7–1 | Mississippi State | Mississippi State eliminated |
| June 3 | Game 11 | Arizona State | 14–4 | Long Beach State | Long Beach State eliminated |
| June 4 | Game 12 | Southern California | 5–4 | LSU | |
| June 5 | Game 13 | Southern California | 7–3 | LSU | LSU eliminated |
| June 6 | Final | Southern California | 21–14 | Arizona State | Southern California wins CWS |

== All-Tournament Team ==
The following players were members of the College World Series All-Tournament Team.

| Position | Player | School |
|---|---|---|
| P | Jack Krawczyk | USC |
| P | Alex Santos | Miami (FL) |
| C | Eric Munson | USC |
| 1B | Robb Gorr | USC |
| 2B | Wes Rachels (MOP) | USC |
| 3B | Andrew Beinbrink | Arizona State |
| SS | Michael Collins | Arizona State |
| OF | Rudy Arguellas | Arizona State |
| OF | Cedrick Harris | LSU |
| OF | Brad Ticehurst | USC |
| DH | Jason Lane | USC |

=== Notable players ===
- Arizona State: Andrew Beinbrink, Willie Bloomquist, Ryan Mills
- Florida: Mark Ellis, Josh Fogg, David Ross, Brad Wilkerson
- Florida State: Kevin Cash
- Long Beach State: Mike Gallo
- LSU: Kurt Ainsworth, Randy Keisler
- Miami (FL): Pat Burrell, Bobby Hill, Aubrey Huff, Jason Michaels
- Mississippi State: Matt Ginter
- Southern California: Morgan Ensberg, Seth Etherton, Jason Lane, Eric Munson

== See also ==
- 1998 NCAA Division I softball tournament
- 1998 NCAA Division II baseball tournament
- 1998 NCAA Division III baseball tournament
- 1998 NAIA World Series
