= 1998 USC Trojans baseball team =

Baseball team of California

1998 USC Trojans baseball

National champions
- Conference: Pacific-10 Conference

Ranking
- Coaches: No. 1
- CB: No. 1
- Record: 49–17 (21–9 Pac-10)
- Head coach: Mike Gillespie (12th year)
- Home stadium: Dedeaux Field

1998 Pacific-10 Conference baseball standings
	Conf.				Overall
Team	W		L	PCT	W		L	PCT
Northern
No. 13 Washington ^{x}‍‍‍^{y}	17	–	7	.708	41	–	17	.707
Oregon State ‍‍‍	15	–	9	.625	35	–	14	.714
Washington State ‍‍‍	12	–	12	.500	25	–	24	.510
Portland State ‍‍‍	4	–	20	.167	17	–	34	.333
Southern
No. 9 Stanford ^{x}‍‍‍^{y}	22	–	8	.733	42	–	14	.750
No. 1 Southern California ‍‍‍^{y}	21	–	9	.700	49	–	17	.742
No. 2 Arizona State ‍‍‍^{y}	18	–	11	.621	41	–	23	.641
Arizona ‍‍‍	12	–	18	.400	33	–	23	.589
UCLA ‍‍‍	11	–	19	.367	23	–	33	.411
California ‍‍‍	5	–	24	.172	22	–	32	.407
x – Division champion y – Invited to the NCAA tournament As of June 30, 1998; Rankings from Collegiate Baseball

The 1998 USC Trojans baseball team represented the University of Southern California in the 1998 NCAA Division I baseball season. The team was coached by Mike Gillespie in his 12th season.

The Trojans won the College World Series, defeating the Arizona State Sun Devils in the championship game.

== Roster ==
1998 USC Trojans roster
Pitchers: Rik Currier; Don DiDomizio; Seth Etherton; Tanner Eriksen; Ronald Flores; Marco Hernandez; Steve Immel; Craig Jones; Shaun Kramer; Jack Krawczyk; Peter Krogh; Jason Lane; Raul Lepe; Mike Penney; Jason Saenz; Chris Tessman; Brian Vieira; Mike Weibling; Taiki Yamaoka	Infielders: Carlos Casillas; Oscar Casillas; Dominic Correa; Seth Davidson; Morgan Ensberg; Robb Gorr; Ray Kasper; Brandon Mugavero; Bill Peavey; Josh Persell; Wes Rachels; Kevin Schultz	Outfielders: Jeremy Freitas; Greg Hanoian; Rod Perry, Jr.; Brad Ticehurst; Tony Alston; Ivan Garcia; Catchers: Jeff DePippo; Mike McHargue; Eric Munson; Josh Townsend

== Schedule ==
1998 USC Trojans baseball game log
Regular season
January/February

Date	Opponent	Score	Overall record	Pac-10 record
January 30	Long Beach State	16–4	1–0	–
February 1	Long Beach State	9–5	2–0	–
February 7	Texas	5–3	3–0	–
February 7	Texas	5–6	3–1	–
February 8	Texas	7–15	3–2	–
February 10	at Long Beach State	12–3	4–2	–
February 13	vs. North Carolina	10–0	5–2	–
February 14	vs. North Carolina	16–9	6–2	–
February 15	vs. North Carolina	10–2	7–2	–
February 18	at Cal State Fullerton	3–2	8–2	–
February 20	vs. Arizona	10–3	9–2	1–0
February 21	vs. Arizona	4–1	10–2	2–0
February 22	vs. Arizona	2–3	10–3	2–1
February 25	at Pepperdine	5–2	11–3	–
February 27	UCLA	6–1	12–3	3–1
February 28	UCLA	10–9	13–3	4–1

March

Date	Opponent	Score	Overall record	Pac-10 record
March 1	UCLA	7–12	13–4	4–2
March 3	UC Santa Barbara	15–8	14–4	–
March 6	Oregon State	9–0	15–4	–
March 7	Oregon State	7–4	16–4	–
March 8	Oregon State	6–13	16–5	–
March 14	Arizona State	7–6	17–5	5–2
March 14	Arizona State	13–5	18–5	6–2
March 15	Arizona State	6–3	19–5	7–2
March 17	Loyola Marymount	6–4	20–5	–
March 20	at Arizona	6–4	21–5	8–2
March 21	at Arizona	7–6	22–5	9–2
March 22	at Arizona	10–6	23–5	10–2
March 24	Pepperdine	11–1	24–5	–
March 27	at California	10–6	25–5	11–2
March 28	at California	7–6	26–5	12–2
March 29	at California	8–1	27–5	13–2

April

Date	Opponent	Score	Overall record	Pac-10 record
April 1	Cal State Fullerton	4–7	27–6	–
April 3	Stanford	0–1	27–7	13–3
April 5	Stanford	6–7	27–8	13–4
April 5	Stanford	7–4	28–8	14–4
April 6	Hawaii-Hilo	12–3	29–8	–
April 9	at Arizona State	3–18	29–9	14–5
April 10	at Arizona State	5–7	29–10	14–6
April 11	at Arizona State	4–24	29–11	14–7
April 14	at Loyola Marymount	6–12	29–12	–
April 17	California	10–0	30–12	15–7
April 18	California	14–13	31–12	16–7
April 19	California	5–2	32–12	17–7
April 21	at San Diego State	9–4	33–12	–
April 24	at UCLA	14–6	34–12	18–7
April 25	UCLA	17–18	34–13	18–8
April 26	at UCLA	17–12	35–13	19–8
April 28	San Diego State	17–10	36–13	–
April 29	UC Santa Barbara	9–8	37–13	–

May

Date	Opponent	Score	Overall record	Pac-10 record
May 9	at Stanford	2–4	37–14	19–9
May 10	at Stanford	5–2	38–14	20–9
May 11	at Stanford	5–1	39–14	21–9
May 15	at Portland State	10–2	40–14	–
May 15	at Portland State	6–7	40–15	–

Postseason
NCAA tournament: East Regional

Date	Opponent	Site/stadium	Score	Overall record
May 21	vs. Fordham	Tiger Field	10–6	41–15
May 22	vs. Virginia Commonwealth	Tiger Field	4–14	41–16
May 23	vs. Clemson	Tiger Field	8–5	42–16
May 23	vs. South Alabama	Tiger Field	3–2	43–16
May 24	vs. South Alabama	Tiger Field	4–3	44–16

NCAA tournament: College World Series

Date	Opponent	Site/stadium	Score	Overall record
May 30	vs. LSU	Rosenblatt Stadium	10–12	44–17
June 1	vs. Florida	Rosenblatt Stadium	12–10	45–17
June 2	vs. Mississippi State	Rosenblatt Stadium	7–1	46–17
June 4	vs. LSU	Rosenblatt Stadium	5–4	47–17
June 5	vs. LSU	Rosenblatt Stadium	7–3	48–17
June 6	vs. Arizona State	Rosenblatt Stadium	21–14	49–17

== Awards and honors ==
Rik Currier

- Freshman All-America

Seth Davidson

- Freshman All-America
- All-Pac-10 First Team

Morgan Ensberg

- All-America Third Team
- All-Pac-10 First Team

Seth Etherton

- The Sporting News Player of the Year
- All-America First Team
- Pac-10 Pitcher of the Year
- All-Pac-10 First Team

Jeremy Freitas

- All-Pac-10 Honorable Mention

Rob Gorr

- College World Series All-Tournament Team
- All-Pac-10 First Team

Jack Krawczyk

- College World Series All-Tournament Team
- All-America First Team
- All-Pac-10 First Team

Jason Lane

- College World Series All-Tournament Team

Eric Munson

- College World Series All-Tournament Team
- All-America Second Team
- All-Pac-10 Honorable Mention

Wes Rachels

- College World Series Most Outstanding Player
- All-Pac-10 Honorable Mention

Brad Ticehurst

- College World Series All-Tournament Team
- All-Pac-10 Honorable Mention

== Trojans in the 1998 MLB draft ==
The following members of the USC baseball program were drafted in the 1998 Major League Baseball draft.

Player	Position	Round	Overall	MLB Team
Seth Etherton	RHP	1st	18th	California Angels
Jason Saenz	LHP	3rd	94th	New York Mets
Brad Ticehurst	OF	8th	233rd	Texas Rangers
Mike Penney	RHP	8th	236th	Milwaukee Brewers
Morgan Ensberg	3B	9th	272nd	Houston Astros
Rob Gorr	1B	14th	426th	Los Angeles Dodgers
Craig Jones	RHP	16th	467th	Kansas City Royals
Jeremy Freitas	OF	25th	737th	Kansas City Royals
Jack Krawczyk	RHP	25th	746th	Milwaukee Brewers
Jeff DePippo	C	27th	813th	Cleveland Indians
Wes Rachels	2B	33rd	974th	Philadelphia Phillies

== See also ==
- USC Trojans baseball
