= 1998 NCAA Division I baseball rankings =

1998 NCAA Division I baseball season

Tournament

College World Series
- Champions: Southern California
- Runners-up: Arizona State
- MOP: Wes Rachels (Southern California)

Seasons
- ← 1997 1999 →

The following polls make up the 1998 NCAA Division I baseball rankings. USA Today and ESPN began publishing the Coaches' Poll of 31 active coaches ranking the top 25 teams in the nation in 1992. Each coach is a member of the American Baseball Coaches Association. Baseball America began publishing its poll of the top 20 teams in college baseball in 1981. Beginning with the 1985 season, it expanded to the top 25. Collegiate Baseball Newspaper published its first human poll of the top 20 teams in college baseball in 1957, and expanded to rank the top 30 teams in 1961.

== USA Today/ESPN Coaches' Poll ==
Currently, only the final poll from the 1998 season is available.

Rank	Team
1	Southern California
2	Arizona State
3	Miami (FL)
4	LSU
5	Florida
6	Stanford
7	Florida State
8	Wichita State
9	Auburn
10	Long Beach State
11	Texas A&M
12	Alabama
13	Cal State Fullerton
14	Mississippi State
15	Rice
16	South Carolina
17	Washington
18	South Alabama
19	Georgia Tech
20	Tulane
21	Clemson
22	Baylor
23	Illinois
24	North Carolina
25	Texas Tech

== Baseball America ==
Currently, only the final poll from the 1998 season is available.

Rank	Team
1	Southern California
2	Arizona State
3	Miami (FL)
4	LSU
5	Florida
6	Stanford
7	Florida State
8	Wichita State
9	Auburn
10	Long Beach State
11	Texas A&M
12	Alabama
13	Cal State Fullerton
14	Mississippi State
15	Rice
16	South Carolina
17	Washington
18	South Alabama
19	Georgia Tech
20	Tulane
21	Clemson
22	Baylor
23	Illinois
24	North Carolina
25	Texas Tech

== Collegiate Baseball ==
Currently, only the final six polls from the 1998 season are available.

	Week 1 Apr 27	Week 2 May 4	Week 3 May 11	Week 4 May 18	Week 5 May 25	Week 6 June 8	
1.	Miami (FL) (40–5)	Stanford (40–8–1)	Stanford (41–9–1)	Miami (FL) (46–9)	Miami (FL) (50–10)	Southern California (49–17)	1.
2.	Stanford (36–8–1)	Miami (FL) (42–7)	Miami (FL) (44–8)	Stanford (41–12–1)	Florida (46–16)	Arizona State (41–23)	2.
3.	South Carolina (38–10)	LSU (40–13)	Florida (41–13)	Wichita State (55–5)	LSU (46–17)	LSU (48–19)	3.
4.	Florida (35–12)	South Carolina (39–12)	Wichita State (51–5)	Florida (42–15)	Southern California (44–16)	Long Beach State (43–23–1)	4.
5.	LSU (37–13)	Florida (37–13)	LSU (41–15)	LSU (42–17)	Florida State (53–18)	Miami (FL) (51–12)	5.
6.	Wichita State (39–4)	Wichita State (44–5)	South Carolina (42–14)	Southern California (40–15)	Arizona State (38–22)	Mississippi State (43–23)	6.
7.	Clemson (40–8)	Southern California (37–13)	Southern California (38–14)	Rice (45–15)	Long Beach State (41–21–1)	Florida (46–18)	7.
8.	Southern California (35–13)	Cal State Fullerton (40–12)	Cal State Fullerton (42–13)	Cal State Fullerton (44–15)	Mississippi State (41–21)	Florida State (53–20)	8.
9.	Rice (39–14)	Rice (39–14)	Rice (41–15)	South Carolina (42–16)	Stanford (42–14–1)	Stanford (42–14–1)	9.
10.	Cal State Fullerton (36–12)	Clemson (40–9)	Florida State (45–16)	Florida State (49–18)	Wichita State (56–7)	Wichita State (56–7)	10.
11.	Alabama (35–12)	Alabama (38–13)	Alabama (40–14)	Auburn (43–16)	Cal State Fullerton (47–17)	Cal State Fullerton (47–17)	11.
12.	Arizona State (32–16)	Florida State (42–15)	Texas A&M (40–16)	Texas A&M (43–18)	Auburn (46–18)	Auburn (46–18)	12.
13.	Texas A&M (37–15)	Texas A&M (40–16)	Oklahoma (38–16)	Alabama (43–16)	Washington (41–17)	Washington (41–17)	13.
14.	Florida State (40–14)	Arizona State (33–20)	Auburn (39–15)	Oklahoma (40–18)	Texas A&M (46–20)	Texas A&M (46–20)	14.
15.	Auburn (34–11)	Auburn (36–13)	Georgia Tech (37–18)	Washington (39–15)	Georgia Tech (41–22)	Georgia Tech (41–22)	15.
16.	Oklahoma State (34–13)	Baylor (39–16–1)	Baylor (39–16–1)	Tulane (47–13)	Alabama (46–18)	Alabama (46–18)	16.
17.	Baylor (37–14–1)	Oklahoma (35–16)	Arizona State (34–21)	Arizona State (34–21)	Rice (46–17)	Rice (46–17)	17.
18.	Ohio State (29–11)	Oklahoma State (36–15)	Clemson (42–12)	Clemson (42–14)	North Carolina (42–23)	North Carolina (42–23)	18.
19.	VCU (38–8)	Washington (33–14)	Washington (37–15)	Georgia Tech (38–20)	South Carolina (44–18)	South Carolina (44–18)	19.
20.	Washington (29–13)	Illinois (35–17)	Illinois (36–17)	Long Beach State (37–20–1)	Illinois (42–21)	Illinois (42–21)	20.
21.	Oregon State (31–11–1)	South Alabama (37–14)	Tulane (43–13)	Baylor (40–18–1)	South Alabama (42–19)	South Alabama (42–19)	21.
22.	Notre Dame (34–11)	Mississippi State (34–16)	Minnesota (42–13)	Minnesota (45–13)	Oklahoma (42–20)	Oklahoma (42–20)	22.
23.	Oklahoma (32–15)	Ohio State (32–13)	South Alabama (37–15)	Oral Roberts (44–18)	Clemson (42–16)	Clemson (42–16)	23.
24.	Illinois (31–16)	Notre Dame (37–13)	Delaware (40–8)	Delaware (43–8)	Harvard (36–12)	Harvard (36–12)	24.
25.	South Alabama (34–14)	Delaware (39–8)	Oral Roberts (42–18)	Texas Tech (43–18)	Tulane (48–15)	Tulane (48–15)	25.
26.	Delaware (34–8)	Tulane (40–13)	Ohio State (36–14)	South Alabama (39–17)	VCU (46–15)	VCU (46–15)	26.
27.	Tulane (35–12)	Texas Tech (36–17)	Texas Tech (39–17)	Wake Forest (41–21)	Wake Forest (43–23)	Wake Forest (43–23)	27.
28.	Texas Tech (35–17)	VCU (41–11)	Mississippi State (35–18)	Arkansas (37–19)	Baylor (41–20–1)	Baylor (41–20–1)	28.
29.	Mississippi State (31–15)	Minnesota (37–12)	VCU (42–11)	North Carolina (39–21)	Texas Tech (44–20)	Texas Tech (44–20)	29.
30.	Arkansas (30–15)	San Diego State (30–20)	Oregon State (35–14–1)	Illinois (39–19)	Rutgers (33–16)	Rutgers (33–16)	30.
	Week 1 Apr 27	Week 2 May 4	Week 3 May 11	Week 4 May 18	Week 5 May 25	Week 6 June 8	
		Dropped: 21 Oregon State; 30 Arkansas	Dropped: 18 Oklahoma State; 24 Notre Dame; 30 San Diego State	Dropped: 26 Ohio State; 28 Mississippi State; 29 VCU; 30 Oregon State	Dropped: 22 Minnesota; 23 Oral Roberts; 24 Delaware; 28 Arkansas	None	
