= Brad Wilkerson =

American baseball player (born 1977)

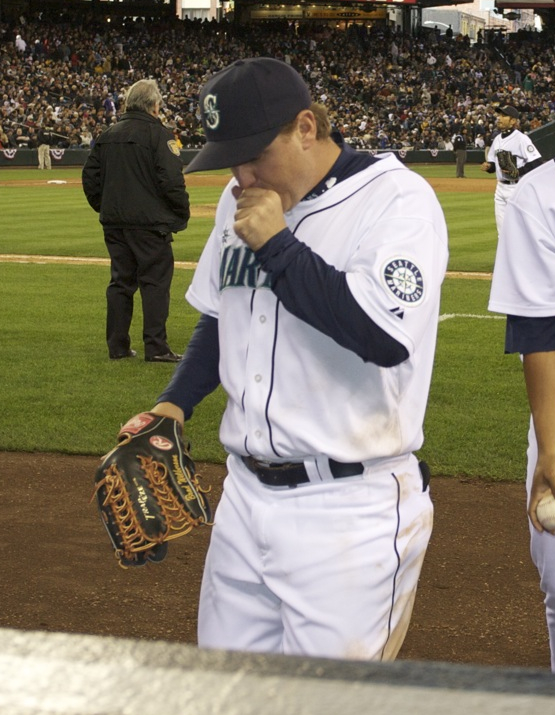
- Wilkerson with the Mariners in 2008
- Outfielder / First baseman
- Born: June 1, 1977 (age 49); Owensboro, Kentucky, U.S.
- Batted: Left Threw: Left

MLB debut
- July 12, 2001, for the Montreal Expos

Last MLB appearance
- September 28, 2008, for the Toronto Blue Jays

MLB statistics
- Batting average: .247
- Home runs: 122
- Runs batted in: 399
- Stats at Baseball Reference

Teams
- Montreal Expos / Washington Nationals (2001–2005); Texas Rangers (2006–2007); Seattle Mariners (2008); Toronto Blue Jays (2008)

Member of the National College

Baseball Hall of Fame
- Induction: 2012
Medals
Men's baseball
Representing United States
Olympic Games
Gold medal – first place	2000 Sydney	Team
World Junior Baseball Championship
Gold medal – first place	1995 Massachusetts	Team

Stephen Bradley Wilkerson (born June 1, 1977) is an American former professional baseball outfielder and first baseman who played eight seasons in Major League Baseball (MLB).

Wilkerson played college baseball for the University of Florida, and was selected by the Montreal Expos in the first round of the 1998 MLB draft. During his major league career, Wilkerson played for the Montreal Expos / Washington Nationals, Boston Red Sox, Texas Rangers, Seattle Mariners, and Toronto Blue Jays. He also won a gold medal in the 2000 Olympics with the United States.

Wilkerson became a coach after retiring as a player. He is currently the associate head coach of the North Florida Ospreys. He served as an assistant hitting coach for the New York Yankees in 2023.

== Early years ==
Wilkerson attended and played baseball at Apollo High School. He also played for the U.S. national under-18 team in 1995. He was the most valuable player of the World Junior Baseball Championship, pitching a three-hit shutout against Taiwan in the gold medal game, hitting .360, and leading Team USA with three home runs and eight runs batted in (RBI) for the tournament.

== College career ==
A line drive hitter and versatile defensive player, Wilkerson received an athletic scholarship to attend the University of Florida in Gainesville, Florida, where he played for coach Andy Lopez's Florida Gators baseball team from 1996 to 1998. A three-time first-team All-American, Wilkerson led the Gators to the College World Series in 1996 and 1998 with both his hitting and pitching. In the 1996 College World Series, he hit a dramatic grand slam to defeat the rival Florida State Seminoles.

As a junior in 1998, he became the first player in college history to hit 20 home runs, steal 20 bases, and win 10 games as a pitcher in the same year. The Gators advanced to the 1998 College World Series, and he was awarded the Rotary Smith Award as the most outstanding player in college baseball.

The pitcher-outfielder holds a number of season and career school records, including career batting average (.381), career slugging percentage (.714), and career on-base percentage (.531).

Wilkerson was inducted into the University of Florida Athletic Hall of Fame as a "Gator Great" in 2010, and the National College Baseball Hall of Fame in 2012. In 2014, he received his bachelor's degree in sport management from the University of Florida.

== Professional career ==
=== Minor leagues ===
The Montreal Expos selected Wilkerson in the first round, with the 33rd overall selection, of the 1998 Major League Baseball draft. Initially, he struggled in the minors. In 1999, Wilkerson hit .235 with eight home runs and 49 RBI with the Double-A Harrisburg Senators. Back in the Eastern League to start the 2000 season, Wilkerson tore up the league, hitting .336 with six home runs, 44 RBI and 36 doubles in 66 games. He was on pace to break the Eastern League record for doubles in a season before he was promoted to Triple-A Ottawa, of the International League. For the season, Wilkerson played in 129 games combined between Harrisburg and Ottawa, batting .295 with 18 home runs, 79 RBIs, and 47 doubles in 441 at-bats.

While coming up through the minors, Wilkerson was a member of the gold medal-winning United States baseball team in the Sydney Olympics. In one of the biggest upsets in Olympic baseball history, Team USA defeated Cuba 4–0 in the gold medal game.

=== Major leagues ===
Wilkerson made his major league debut with Montreal on July 12, 2001 against the Tampa Bay Devil Rays. He finished the game 0-for-3 with a walk. He recorded his first major league hit off Tim Wakefield of the Boston Red Sox on July 17, 2001, and his first major league home run off Atlanta Braves pitcher Jason Marquis on July 26, 2001.

In 2002 and 2003, Wilkerson delivered almost identical seasons with a .266 average, 20 home runs and 59 RBI in 2002, and a .268 average, 19 home runs, and 77 RBI in 2003. In 2002, Wilkerson's 20 home runs set an Expos rookie record, and he was named Rookie of the Year by The Sporting News. His most productive season came in 2004, when he posted career-highs in homers (32), hits (146), doubles (39), runs (112), walks (106), slugging percentage (.498) and OPS (.872), and hitting .255 with 67 RBI. He hit for the cycle on June 24, 2003, against Pittsburgh (with the Expos). In that first instance, Wilkerson became the first player since 1957 to have the minimum four plate appearances and hit for a natural cycle.

In 2004, he hit the last home run in Expos franchise history. He appeared once more in an Expos uniform during the MLB Japan All-Star Series following the regular season. The Expos franchise then became the Washington Nationals for the 2005 season, prompting some to call Wilkerson "The Last Expo."

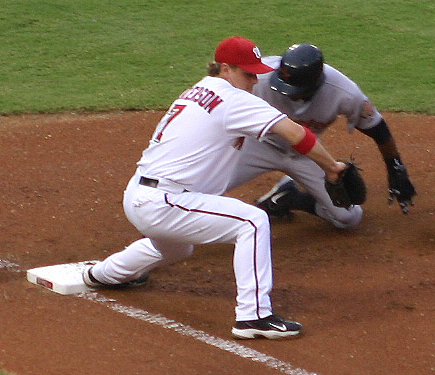
Wilkerson playing for the Nationals in 2005

Wilkerson opened the 2005 season as the regular center fielder and leadoff hitter for the Nationals. He hit for the cycle for the second time on April 6, against Philadelphia in the Nationals' second game after leaving Montreal. Wilkerson also hit the first grand slam by a Nationals player.

On December 7, 2005, Wilkerson was traded to the Texas Rangers along with outfielder Terrmel Sledge and pitching prospect Armando Galarraga for second baseman Alfonso Soriano. With the Rangers in 2007, Wilkerson hit three home runs in one game against the Los Angeles Angels of Anaheim, the third player to do so in 2007 after Soriano and Carlos Lee. An injury to, and later the trade of, Mark Teixeira led to Wilkerson making many of his starts at first base in 2007.

On January 31, 2008, Wilkerson signed a one-year, $3 million contract with the Seattle Mariners. He started on opening day, but after batting .232 in 19 games, the Mariners designated him for assignment on April. On May 8, he was given his unconditional release. On May 9, he signed with the Toronto Blue Jays. He is one of the few players to play both Canadian MLB teams, the Blue Jays and Expos. On August 22, he was put on the 15-day injured list with lower back spasms. On October 30, 2008, Wilkerson elected free agency.

On February 16, 2009, Wilkerson signed a minor league contract with an invitation to spring training with the Boston Red Sox. He decided to retire in April 2009, having had one hit in nine Triple-A at-bats.

Attempting a comeback, Wilkerson signed a minor league contract with the Philadelphia Phillies on February 23, 2010. However, he was released on March 29. He retired with a .247 batting average, .350 on-base percentage, and 122 career home runs.

== Coaching career ==
In 2014, Wilkerson agreed to manage a middle school baseball team at The King's Academy in West Palm Beach, Florida, leading the team to a league championship in his first year. After the season, Wilkerson was hired as the school's high school coach.

Wilkerson is also a coach for USA Baseball. In 2014, he was named Volunteer Coach of the Year by the organization.

On July 17, 2020, Jacksonville University hired Wilkerson as an assistant coach for the Dolphins.

On January 30, 2023, the New York Yankees hired Wilkerson as their assistant hitting coach. The team relieved him of the position after the season and replaced him with Pat Roessler.

On Aug. 17, 2024, Wilkerson was hired as the associate head coach at the University of North Florida, where he is in charge of hitting and coaching third base.

== Personal life ==
Wilkerson married Dana Marie Gleason in 2006. They have three children, Ella, Ava and Max. In 2006, he was named a Kentucky Colonel by Governor Ernie Fletcher, the highest honor of the Commonwealth of Kentucky.

Wilkerson participated in numerous charitable functions over the course of his major league career and he continues to do so post-retirement. He holds a charity golf tournament annually to raise money for various children's charities.

== See also ==
- 1997 College Baseball All-America Team
- 1998 College Baseball All-America Team
- List of Major League Baseball players to hit for the cycle
- List of Florida Gators baseball players in Major League Baseball
- List of Olympic medalists in baseball
- List of University of Florida Olympians
- List of University of Florida Athletic Hall of Fame members
- National College Baseball Hall of Fame

Awards and achievements
Preceded by Albert Pujols	Sporting News; National League Rookie of the Year; 2002	Succeeded by Scott Podsednik
Preceded by Greg Colbrunn; Jeff DaVanon	Hitting for the cycle June 24, 2003; April 6, 2005	Succeeded by Eric Byrnes; Mark Grudzielanek
