= 1998 Arizona State Sun Devils baseball team =

American college baseball season

1998 Arizona State Sun Devils baseball

Midwest Regional champions

College World Series, 2nd
- Conference: Pac-10 Conference

Ranking
- Coaches: No. 2
- CB: No. 2
- Record: 41–23 (18–11 Pac-10)
- Head coach: Pat Murphy (4th year)
- Home stadium: Packard Stadium

1998 Pacific-10 Conference baseball standings
| | Conf. | | | | Overall |
| Team | W | | L | PCT | W | | L | PCT |
|---|---|---|---|---|---|---|---|---|
Northern
| No. 13 Washington ^{x}‍‍‍^{y} | 17 | – | 7 | .708 | 41 | – | 17 | .707 |
| Oregon State ‍‍‍ | 15 | – | 9 | .625 | 35 | – | 14 | .714 |
| Washington State ‍‍‍ | 12 | – | 12 | .500 | 25 | – | 24 | .510 |
| Portland State ‍‍‍ | 4 | – | 20 | .167 | 17 | – | 34 | .333 |
Southern
| No. 9 Stanford ^{x}‍‍‍^{y} | 22 | – | 8 | .733 | 42 | – | 14 | .750 |
| No. 1 Southern California ‍‍‍^{y} | 21 | – | 9 | .700 | 49 | – | 17 | .742 |
| No. 2 Arizona State ‍‍‍^{y} | 18 | – | 11 | .621 | 41 | – | 23 | .641 |
| Arizona ‍‍‍ | 12 | – | 18 | .400 | 33 | – | 23 | .589 |
| UCLA ‍‍‍ | 11 | – | 19 | .367 | 23 | – | 33 | .411 |
| California ‍‍‍ | 5 | – | 24 | .172 | 22 | – | 32 | .407 |
x – Division champion y – Invited to the NCAA tournament As of June 30, 1998; Rankings from Collegiate Baseball

The 1998 Arizona State Sun Devils baseball team represented Arizona State University in the 1998 NCAA Division I baseball season. The Sun Devils played their home games at Packard Stadium. The team was coached by Pat Murphy in his fourth season at Arizona State.

The Sun Devils reached the College World Series, finishing as the runner up to Southern California.

== Personnel ==
=== Roster ===
1998 Arizona State Sun Devils roster
| Pitchers: - Chuck Crumpton - Junior; - Aaron Kramer - Senior; - Phill Lowery - Junior; - Ryan Mills - Junior; - Robby Milner - Freshman; - Chad Pennington - Freshman; Catchers: - Greg Halvorson - Junior; - Jeremy Jones - Junior | Infielders: - Andrew Beinbrink - Junior; - Willie Bloomquist; - Michael Collins - Junior; - Chip Gosewisch - Junior; - Richy Leon - Senior; - Dan Meier - Junior; - Jeff Phelps - Freshman; Outfielders: - Rudy Arguelles - Senior; - Dustin Delucchi - Sophomore; - Brian Heintzelman - Senior; - Mikel Moreno - Senior | Unknown: - Colin Call; - Mark Ernster; - Drew Friedberg; - Jay Gehrke; - Casey Myers - Freshman; - Jay Sitzman; - Rick Wiens |

=== Coaches ===
1994 Arizona State Sun Devils baseball coaching staff
- Pat Murphy - Head coach - 4th year

== Schedule ==
Legend
| Arizona State win |
| Arizona State loss |

1998 Arizona State Sun Devils baseball game log
Regular season

January
| Date | Opponent | Rank | Site/stadium | Score | Overall record | Pac-10 record |
|---|---|---|---|---|---|---|
| Jan 22 | Cal State Northridge* | | Packard Stadium • Tempe, AZ | W 7–3 | 1–0 | |
| Jan 23 | New Mexico State* | | Packard Stadium • Tempe, AZ | W 13–1 | 2–0 | |
| Jan 24 | FIU* | | Packard Stadium • Tempe, AZ | W 21–3 | 3–0 | |
| Jan 29 | at Hawaii–Hilo* | | Hilo, HI | W 7–0 | 4–0 | |
| Jan 30 | at Hawaii–Hilo* | | Hilo, HI | W 11–2 | 5–0 | |
| Jan 31 | at Hawaii–Hilo* | | Hilo, HI | W 13–2 | 6–0 | |
| Jan 31 | at Hawaii–Hilo* | | Hilo, HI | W 5–1 | 7–0 | |

February
| Date | Opponent | Rank | Site/stadium | Score | Overall record | Pac-10 record |
|---|---|---|---|---|---|---|
| Feb 1 | at Hawaii–Hilo* | | Hilo, HI | W 14–0 | 8–0 | |
| Feb 6 | #23 Florida State* | | Packard Stadium • Tempe, AZ | L 2–3 | 8–1 | |
| Feb 7 | #23 Florida State* | | Packard Stadium • Tempe, AZ | L 1–6 | 8–2 | |
| Feb 13 | Washington State* | | Packard Stadium • Tempe, AZ | W 9–1 | 9–2 | |
| Feb 14 | Washington State* | | Packard Stadium • Tempe, AZ | W 6–5 | 10–2 | |
| Feb 15 | Washington State* | | Packard Stadium • Tempe, AZ | L 12–17 | 10–3 | |
| Feb 20 | at California | | Evans Diamond • Berkeley, CA | W 8–7 | 11–3 | 1–0 |
| Feb 21 | at California | | Evans Diamond • Berkeley, CA | W 7–4 | 12–3 | 2–0 |
| Feb 27 | #1 Stanford | | Packard Stadium • Tempe, AZ | L 2–15 | 12–4 | 2–1 |
| Feb 28 | #1 Stanford | | Packard Stadium • Tempe, AZ | L 5–17 | 12–5 | 2–2 |

March
| Date | Opponent | Rank | Site/stadium | Score | Overall record | Pac-10 record |
|---|---|---|---|---|---|---|
| March 1 | #1 Stanford | | Packard Stadium • Tempe, AZ | W 4–2 | 13–5 | 3–2 |
| March 6 | at UCLA | | Jackie Robinson Stadium • Los Angeles, CA | L 5–6 | 13–6 | 3–3 |
| March 7 | at UCLA | | Jackie Robinson Stadium • Los Angeles, CA | W 14–6 | 14–6 | 4–3 |
| March 8 | at UCLA | | Jackie Robinson Stadium • Los Angeles, CA | W 9–3 | 15–6 | 5–3 |
| March 10 | Oklahoma* | | Packard Stadium • Tempe, AZ | W 7–6^{10} | 16–6 | |
| March 11 | Oklahoma* | | Packard Stadium • Tempe, AZ | L 5–9 | 16–7 | |
| March 14 | at #3 Southern California | | Dedeaux Field • Los Angeles, CA | L 6–7 | 16–8 | 5–4 |
| March 15 | at #3 Southern California | | Dedeaux Field • Los Angeles, CA | L 5–13 | 16–9 | 5–5 |
| March 16 | at #3 Southern California | | Dedeaux Field • Los Angeles, CA | L 3–6 | 16–10 | 5–6 |
| March 17 | at Fresno State* | | Pete Beiden Field • Fresno, CA | L 3–9 | 16–11 | |
| March 18 | at Fresno State* | | Pete Beiden Field • Fresno, CA | L 5–6^{10} | 16–12 | |
| March 20 | California | | Packard Stadium • Tempe, AZ | W 6–1 | 17–12 | 6–6 |
| March 21 | California | | Packard Stadium • Tempe, AZ | W 7–2 | 18–12 | 7–6 |
| March 22 | California | | Packard Stadium • Tempe, AZ | W 7–6 | 19–12 | 8–6 |
| March 24 | at Grand Canyon* | | Brazell Stadium • Phoenix, AZ | W 10–0 | 20–12 | |
| March 27 | at #19 Washington* | | Husky Ballpark • Seattle, WA | L 6–8 | 20–13 | |
| March 28 | at #19 Washington* | | Husky Ballpark • Seattle, WA | L 6–7 | 20–14 | |
| March 29 | at #19 Washington* | | Husky Ballpark • Seattle, WA | W 7–6 | 21–14 | |

April
| Date | Opponent | Rank | Site/stadium | Score | Overall record | Pac-10 record |
|---|---|---|---|---|---|---|
| April 3 | at #24 Arizona | | Frank Sancet Stadium • Tucson, AZ | W 4–3 | 22–14 | 9–6 |
| April 4 | at #24 Arizona | | Frank Sancet Stadium • Tucson, AZ | W 20–12 | 23–14 | 10–6 |
| April 5 | at #24 Arizona | | Frank Sancet Stadium • Tucson, AZ | W 12–4 | 24–14 | 11–6 |
| April 9 | #4 Southern California | | Packard Stadium • Tempe, AZ | W 18–3 | 25–14 | 12–6 |
| April 10 | #4 Southern California | | Packard Stadium • Tempe, AZ | W 7–5 | 26–14 | 13–6 |
| April 11 | #4 Southern California | | Packard Stadium • Tempe, AZ | W 24–4 | 27–14 | 14–6 |
| April 14 | at #11 Oklahoma* | | L. Dale Mitchell Baseball Park • Norman, OK | W 10–6^{10} | 28–14 | |
| April 17 | UCLA | | Packard Stadium • Tempe, AZ | W 19–10 | 29–14 | 15–6 |
| April 18 | UCLA | | Packard Stadium • Tempe, AZ | W 8–7 | 30–14 | 16–6 |
| April 19 | UCLA | | Packard Stadium • Tempe, AZ | W 18–4 | 31–14 | 17–6 |
| April 24 | Arizona | | Packard Stadium • Tempe, AZ | L 7–8^{10} | 31–15 | 17–7 |
| April 25 | Arizona | | Packard Stadium • Tempe, AZ | W 16–13 | 32–15 | 18–7 |
| April 26 | Arizona | | Packard Stadium • Tempe, AZ | L 9–10 | 32–16 | 18–8 |
| April 28 | New Mexico* | #12 | Packard Stadium • Tempe, AZ | W 12–7 | 33–16 | |
| April 29 | New Mexico* | #12 | Packard Stadium • Tempe, AZ | L 7–8 | 33–17 | |

May
| Date | Opponent | Rank | Site/stadium | Score | Overall record | Pac-10 record |
|---|---|---|---|---|---|---|
| May 1 | at #2 Stanford | #12 | Sunken Diamond • Stanford, CA | L 4–5 | 33–18 | 18–9 |
| May 2 | at #2 Stanford | #12 | Sunken Diamond • Stanford, CA | L 3–4 | 33–19 | 18–10 |
| May 3 | at #2 Stanford | #12 | Sunken Diamond • Stanford, CA | L 8–12 | 33–20 | 18–11 |
| May 5 | at UNLV* | #14 | Earl Wilson Stadium • Paradise, NV | L 4–5 | 33–21 | |
| May 6 | Southern Utah* | #14 | Packard Stadium • Tempe, AZ | W 3–2 | 34–21 | |

Postseason

NCAA Midwest Regional
| Date | Opponent | Rank | Site/stadium | Score | Overall record | NCAAT record |
|---|---|---|---|---|---|---|
| May 21 | #28 (4) Arkansas | #17 (3) | Eck Stadium • Wichita, KS | W 8–4 | 35–21 | 1–0 |
| May 22 | (5) Oklahoma State | #17 (3) | Eck Stadium • Wichita, KS | L 8–13 | 35–22 | 1–1 |
| May 23 | #3 (1) Wichita State | #17 (3) | Eck Stadium • Wichita, KS | W 6–4 | 36–22 | 2–1 |
| May 23 | (5) Oklahoma State | #17 (3) | Eck Stadium • Wichita, KS | W 13–5 | 37–22 | 3–1 |
| May 25 | #19 (2) Georgia Tech | #17 (3) | Eck Stadium • Wichita, KS | W 3–1 | 38–22 | 4–1 |

College World Series
| Date | Opponent | Rank | Site/stadium | Score | Overall record | CWS record |
|---|---|---|---|---|---|---|
| May 29 | #5 (3) Florida State | #6 (6) | Johnny Rosenblatt Stadium • Omaha, NE | W 11–10 | 39–22 | 1–0 |
| May 31 | #1 (2) Miami (FL) | #6 (6) | Johnny Rosenblatt Stadium • Omaha, NE | W 9–2 | 40–22 | 2–0 |
| June 3 | #7 (7) Long Beach State | #6 (6) | Johnny Rosenblatt Stadium • Omaha, NE | W 14–4 | 41–22 | 3–0 |
| June 6 | #4 (4) Southern California | #6 (6) | Johnny Rosenblatt Stadium • Omaha, NE | L 14–21 | 41–23 | 3–1 |

== Ranking movements ==
Ranking movements Legend: ██ Increase in ranking ██ Decrease in ranking
| | Week | | | | | |
| Poll | 2 | 3 | 4 | 5 | 6 | Final |
|---|---|---|---|---|---|---|
| Coaches' | Not released | | | | | 2 |
| Baseball America | Not released | | | | | 2 |
| Collegiate Baseball | 12 | 14 | 17 | 17 | 6 | 2 |
