= 1998 Miami Hurricanes baseball team =

American college baseball season

1998 Miami Hurricanes baseball

NCAA Atlantic I Regional champions

College World Series, 1–2
- Conference: Independent
- Record: 51–12
- Head coach: Jim Morris (5th year)
- Home stadium: Mark Light Field

1998 NCAA Division I baseball independents standings
| | Conf. | | | | Overall |
| Team | W | | L | PCT | W | | L | PCT |
|---|---|---|---|---|---|---|---|---|
| No. 5 Miami (FL) ‍‍‍^{y} | | – | | – | 51 | – | 12 | .810 |
| Cal State Northridge ‍‍‍ | | – | | – | 37 | – | 19 | .661 |
| Elon ‍‍‍ | | – | | – | 26 | – | 22 | .542 |
| Belmont ‍‍‍ | | – | | – | 23 | – | 21 | .523 |
| Southern Utah ‍‍‍ | | – | | – | 22 | – | 26 | .458 |
| Hawaii–Hilo ‍‍‍ | | – | | – | 16 | – | 34 | .320 |
y – Invited to the NCAA tournament As of June 30, 1998; Rankings from Collegiate Baseball

The 1998 Miami Hurricanes baseball team represented the University of Miami in the 1998 NCAA Division I baseball season. The Hurricanes played their home games at Mark Light Field. The team was coached by Jim Morris in his fifth season at Miami.

The Hurricanes reached the College World Series, where they finished tied for fifth after recording an opening round win against Long Beach State, a second round loss to eventual runner-up Arizona State, and an elimination game loss to Long Beach State.

== Personnel ==
=== Roster ===
1998 Miami Hurricanes roster
| Pitchers: - Tom Farmer - Freshman; - David Gil - Sophomore; - Laz Gutierrez - Junior; - Greg Howell - Sophomore; - Matt Kamalsky - Freshman; - Robbie Morrison - Junior; - Todd Ozias - Senior; - Mike Perrin - Sophomore; - Alex Prendas - Freshman; - Darryl Roque - Junior; - Alex Santos - Junior; - Darin Spassoff - Junior | Catchers: - Russ Jacobson - Sophomore; - Greg Lovelady - Freshman; - Andrew Lopez-Cao; Outfielders: - German Alvarez - Senior; - Charlton Jimerson - Freshman; - Jason Michaels - Senior; - Brian Seever - Junior; - Mark Walker - Sophomore | Infielders: - Gus Alfonso - Sophomore; - Joe Curro - Sophomore; - Kevin Brown - Freshman; - Pat Burrell - Junior; - Kris Clute - Freshman; - Manny Crespo - Freshman; - Frank Fleizach - Junior; - Bobby Hill - Sophomore; - Aubrey Huff - Junior; - Rick Saggese - Junior |

=== Coaches ===
1998 Miami Hurricanes baseball coaching staff
- Jim Morris – Head coach – 5th year

== Schedule and results ==
Legend
| Miami win |
| Miami loss |

1998 Miami Hurricanes baseball game log
Regular season

January
| Date | Opponent | Site/stadium | Score | Overall record |
|---|---|---|---|---|
| Jan 28 | Barry | Mark Light Field • Coral Gables, FL | W 9–0 | 1–0 |
| Jan 30 | South Florida | Mark Light Field • Coral Gables, FL | W 8–5 | 2–0 |
| Jan 31 | South Florida | Mark Light Field • Coral Gables, FL | W 10–3 | 3–0 |

February
| Date | Opponent | Site/stadium | Score | Overall record |
|---|---|---|---|---|
| Feb 1 | South Florida | Mark Light Field • Coral Gables, FL | L 2–15 | 3–1 |
| Feb 7 | Florida | Mark Light Field • Coral Gables, FL | W 11–8 | 4–1 |
| Feb 8 | Florida | Mark Light Field • Coral Gables, FL | W 17–11 | 5–1 |
| Feb 11 | FIU | Mark Light Field • Coral Gables, FL | W 2–1 | 6–1 |
| Feb 14 | at Florida | Alfred A. McKethan Stadium • Gainesville, FL | L 5–19 | 6–2 |
| Feb 15 | at Florida | Alfred A. McKethan Stadium • Gainesville, FL | L 10–14 | 6–3 |
| Feb 17 | Lynn | Mark Light Field • Coral Gables, FL | W 18–3 | 7–3 |
| Feb 20 | Notre Dame | Mark Light Field • Coral Gables, FL | W 18–3 | 8–3 |
| Feb 21 | Notre Dame | Mark Light Field • Coral Gables, FL | W 27–2 | 9–3 |
| Feb 22 | Notre Dame | Mark Light Field • Coral Gables, FL | W 17–3 | 10–3 |
| Feb 27 | Texas | Mark Light Field • Coral Gables, FL | W 5–4 | 11–3 |
| Feb 28 | Texas | Mark Light Field • Coral Gables, FL | W 9–5 | 12–3 |

March
| Date | Opponent | Site/stadium | Score | Overall record |
|---|---|---|---|---|
| Mar 1 | Texas | Mark Light Field • Coral Gables, FL | L 7–8 | 12–4 |
| Mar 6 | Illinois | Mark Light Field • Coral Gables, FL | W 15–1 | 13–4 |
| Mar 7 | Furman | Mark Light Field • Coral Gables, FL | W 6–2 | 14–4 |
| Mar 7 | FIU | Mark Light Field • Coral Gables, FL | W 12–0 | 15–4 |
| Mar 8 | Illinois | Mark Light Field • Coral Gables, FL | W 12–7 | 16–4 |
| Mar 13 | Rutgers | Mark Light Field • Coral Gables, FL | W 9–4 | 17–4 |
| Mar 14 | Rutgers | Mark Light Field • Coral Gables, FL | W 10–2 | 18–4 |
| Mar 15 | Rutgers | Mark Light Field • Coral Gables, FL | W 18–6 | 19–4 |
| Mar 17 | Vermont | Mark Light Field • Coral Gables, FL | W 15–1 | 20–4 |
| Mar 18 | Iona | Mark Light Field • Coral Gables, FL | W 21–4 | 21–4 |
| Mar 20 | North Carolina | Mark Light Field • Coral Gables, FL | W 1–0 | 22–4 |
| Mar 21 | North Carolina | Mark Light Field • Coral Gables, FL | W 8–2 | 23–4 |
| Mar 22 | North Carolina | Mark Light Field • Coral Gables, FL | W 4–2 | 24–4 |
| Mar 25 | vs Drexel | Homestead Sports Complex • Homestead, FL | W 8–6 | 25–4 |
| Mar 27 | Harvard | Mark Light Field • Coral Gables, FL | W 7–0 | 26–4 |
| Mar 28 | Harvard | Mark Light Field • Coral Gables, FL | W 13–0 | 27–4 |
| Mar 29 | Harvard | Mark Light Field • Coral Gables, FL | W 9–2 | 28–4 |

April
| Date | Opponent | Site/stadium | Score | Overall record |
|---|---|---|---|---|
| Apr 3 | at Florida State | Dick Howser Stadium • Tallahassee, FL | W 9–4 | 29–4 |
| Apr 4 | at Florida State | Dick Howser Stadium • Tallahassee, FL | W 8–2 | 30–4 |
| Apr 5 | at Florida State | Dick Howser Stadium • Tallahassee, FL | W 9–6 | 31–4 |
| Apr 10 | Bethune–Cookman | Mark Light Field • Coral Gables, FL | W 9–3 | 32–4 |
| Apr 11 | Bethune–Cookman | Mark Light Field • Coral Gables, FL | W 13–1 | 33–4 |
| Apr 12 | Bethune–Cookman | Mark Light Field • Coral Gables, FL | W 17–0 | 34–4 |
| Apr 15 | Florida Atlantic | Mark Light Field • Coral Gables, FL | W 4–2 | 35–4 |
| Apr 17 | St. Thomas University | Mark Light Field • Coral Gables, FL | W 12–8 | 36–4 |
| Apr 18 | St. Thomas University | Mark Light Field • Coral Gables, FL | W 22–7 | 37–4 |
| Apr 22 | Florida Atlantic | Mark Light Field • Coral Gables, FL | W 23–3 | 38–4 |
| Apr 24 | at Georgia Tech | Russ Chandler Stadium • Atlanta, GA | L 7–22 | 38–5 |
| Apr 25 | at Georgia Tech | Russ Chandler Stadium • Atlanta, GA | W 8–5 | 39–5 |
| Apr 26 | at Georgia Tech | Russ Chandler Stadium • Atlanta, GA | W 9–8 | 40–5 |
| Apr 28 | at FIU | | W 3–2 | 41–5 |

May
| Date | Opponent | Site/stadium | Score | Overall record |
|---|---|---|---|---|
| May 1 | Florida State | Mark Light Field • Coral Gables, FL | W 7–1 | 42–5 |
| May 2 | Florida State | Mark Light Field • Coral Gables, FL | L 5–11 | 42–6 |
| May 3 | Florida State | Mark Light Field • Coral Gables, FL | L 4–5 | 42–7 |
| May 8 | at Jacksonville | John Sessions Stadium • Jacksonville, FL | W 14–8 | 43–7 |
| May 9 | at Jacksonville | John Sessions Stadium • Jacksonville, FL | L 8–14 | 44–8 |
| May 10 | at Jacksonville | John Sessions Stadium • Jacksonville, FL | W 14–6 | 45–8 |
| May 15 | Georgia Southern | Mark Light Field • Coral Gables, FL | W 7–1 | 45–8 |
| May 16 | Georgia Southern | Mark Light Field • Coral Gables, FL | W 13–0 | 46–8 |
| May 17 | Georgia Southern | Mark Light Field • Coral Gables, FL | L 1–2 | 46–9 |

Postseason

NCAA Atlantic I Regional
| Date | Opponent | Seed | Site/stadium | Score | Overall record | NCAAT record |
|---|---|---|---|---|---|---|
| May 21 | (6) Bowling Green | (1) | Mark Light Field • Coral Gables, FL | W 21–6 | 47–9 | 1–0 |
| May 22 | (3) North Carolina | (1) | Mark Light Field • Coral Gables, FL | L 5–6 | 47–10 | 1–1 |
| May 23 | (4) Texas Tech | (1) | Mark Light Field • Coral Gables, FL | W 13–0 | 48–10 | 2–1 |
| May 23 | (2) South Carolina | (1) | Mark Light Field • Coral Gables, FL | W 14–2 | 49–10 | 3–1 |
| May 24 | (3) North Carolina | (1) | Mark Light Field • Coral Gables, FL | W 7–4 | 50–10 | 4–1 |

College World Series
| Date | Opponent | Seed | Site/stadium | Score | Overall record | CWS record |
|---|---|---|---|---|---|---|
| May 29 | (7) Long Beach State | (2) | Johnny Rosenblatt Stadium • Omaha, NE | W 3–1 | 51–10 | 1–0 |
| May 31 | (6) Arizona State | (2) | Johnny Rosenblatt Stadium • Omaha, NE | L 2–9 | 51–11 | 1–1 |
| June 2 | (7) Long Beach State | (2) | Johnny Rosenblatt Stadium • Omaha, NE | L 3–6 | 51–12 | 1–2 |
