= Jeff Austin (baseball) =

American baseball player (born 1976)

- Pitcher
- Born: October 19, 1976 (age 49); San Bernardino, California, U.S.
- Batted: Right Threw: Right

MLB debut
- June 26, 2001, for the Kansas City Royals

Last MLB appearance
- May 28, 2003, for the Cincinnati Reds

MLB statistics
- Win–loss record: 2–3
- Earned run average: 6.75
- Strikeouts: 55
- Stats at Baseball Reference

Teams
- Kansas City Royals (2001–2002); Cincinnati Reds (2003)

Jeffrey Wellington Austin (born October 19, 1976) is a former Major League Baseball pitcher who played for three seasons. He played for the Kansas City Royals from 2001 to 2002 and the Cincinnati Reds in 2003. During a game against the Atlanta Braves on May 28, 2003, in what turned out to be his final appearance in the major leagues, Austin gave up 3 consecutive home runs to start the game, only the second time this had happened in Major League Baseball history.

Austin attended Stanford University, and in 1996 he played collegiate summer baseball with the Cotuit Kettleers of the Cape Cod Baseball League. He was selected by the Royals in the first round of the 1998 MLB draft.
