= 1998 Florida State Seminoles baseball team =

American college baseball season

1998 Florida State Seminoles baseball

ACC champions NCAA Atlantic II Regional champions

College World Series, 0–2
- Conference: Atlantic Coast Conference
- Record: 53–20 (19–5 ACC)
- Head coach: Mike Martin (19th year)
- Home stadium: Dick Howser Stadium

1998 Atlantic Coast Conference baseball standings
	Conf.				Overall
Team	W		L	PCT	W		L	PCT
No. 8 Florida State ‍†‍‍^{y}	18	–	4	.818	53	–	20	.726
No. 15 Georgia Tech ‍‍‍^{y}	14	–	9	.609	41	–	22	.651
No. 23 Clemson ‍‍‍^{y}	14	–	9	.609	43	–	16	.729
NC State ‍‍‍^{y}	12	–	9	.571	39	–	21	.650
No. 27 Wake Forest ‍‍‡‍^{y}	13	–	10	.565	43	–	23	.652
No. 18 North Carolina ‍‍‍^{y}	13	–	10	.565	42	–	23	.646
Duke ‍‍‍	8	–	15	.348	38	–	20	.655
Maryland ‍‍‍	5	–	18	.217	26	–	30	.464
Virginia ‍‍‍	5	–	18	.217	28	–	26	.519
† – Conference champion ‡ – Tournament champion y – Invited to the NCAA tournament As of June 30, 1998; Rankings from Collegiate Baseball

The 1998 Florida State Seminoles baseball team represented Florida State University in the 1998 NCAA Division I baseball season. The Seminoles played their home games at Dick Howser Stadium and played as part of the Atlantic Coast Conference. The team was coached by Mike Martin in his nineteenth season as head coach at Florida State.

The Seminoles reached the College World Series, their fifteenth appearance in Omaha, where they finished tied for seventh place after recording losses to eventual runner-up Arizona State and fourth-place Long Beach State.

== Personnel ==
=== Roster ===
1998 Florida State Seminoles roster
Pitchers: 4 - John Bentley - Sophomore; 10 - Chris Chavez - (redshirt) Junior; 16 - Jason Hubbard - Freshman; 19 - Matt Stanford - Junior; 21 - Blair Varnes - Freshman; 23 - Mike Smalley - Freshman; 24 - Wes Crawford - Sophomore; 26 - Zach Diaz - Junior; 29 - Mike DiBlasi - Sophomore; 30 - Nick Stocks - (redshirt) Freshman; 31 - Scott Proctor - Junior; 33 - David Kelly - Junior; 37 - Chris Ginn - Freshman; 41 - Jon McDonald - (redshirt) Freshman; 44 - Scott Hudson - Sophomore	Catchers: 12 - Jeremy Salazar - Senior; 22 - Henry Mayfield - Junior; 25 - Jeremiah Klosterman - Junior; Infielders: 1 - Brett Groves - Freshman; 7 - Brooks Badeaux - Senior; 9 - Karl Jernigan - Freshman; 13 - Kevin Cash - Sophomore; 15 - Matt Woodward - Senior	Outfielders: 17 - Terry Henderson - Senior; 18 - Eric Heath - Junior; 27 - Brian Cox - Senior; 32 - Matt Diaz - Freshman; 35 - Shawn McCorkel - Sophomore; 43 - Clint Byrd - (redshirt) Freshman; 45 - George Otero - (redshirt) Freshman; Utility: 5 - Jose Zabala - Senior

=== Coaches ===
1998 Florida State Seminoles baseball coaching staff
- Mike Martin - Head coach - 19th year

== Schedule and results ==
Legend
Florida State win
Florida State loss

1998 Florida State Seminoles baseball game log
Regular season

January/February
Date	Opponent	Site/stadium	Score	Overall record	ACC record
Jan 30	vs Notre Dame*	Disney's Wide World of Sports Complex • Bay Lake, FL	L 1–10	0–1	
Jan 31	vs Ohio State*	Disney's Wide World of Sports Complex • Bay Lake, FL	W 6–4	1–1	
Feb 1	vs Tennessee*	Disney's Wide World of Sports Complex • Bay Lake, FL	L 3–5	1–2	
Feb 6	at Arizona State*	Packard Stadium • Tempe, AZ	W 3–2	2–2	
Feb 7	at Arizona State*	Packard Stadium • Tempe, AZ	W 6–1	3–2	
Feb 10	at Hawaii Pacific*	Hans L'Orange Field • Waipahu, HI	W 2–0	4–2	
Feb 10	at Hawaii Pacific*	Hans L'Orange Field • Waipahu, HI	L 8–9	4–3	
Feb 11	at Hawaii*	Rainbow Stadium • Honolulu, HI	W 7–2	5–3	
Feb 12	at Hawaii*	Rainbow Stadium • Honolulu, HI	W 11–2	6–3	
Feb 13	at Hawaii*	Rainbow Stadium • Honolulu, HI	L 6–9	6–4	
Feb 14	at Hawaii*	Rainbow Stadium • Honolulu, HI	L 2–8	6–5	
Feb 17	Charleston Southern*	Dick Howser Stadium • Tallahassee, FL	W 16–0	7–5	
Feb 18	Charleston Southern*	Dick Howser Stadium • Tallahassee, FL	W 13–0	8–5	
Feb 21	at Florida*	Alfred A. McKethan Stadium • Gainesville, FL	L 1–3	8–6	
Feb 24	The Citadel*	Dick Howser Stadium • Tallahassee, FL	W 9–4	9–6	
Feb 25	The Citadel*	Dick Howser Stadium • Tallahassee, FL	W 15–5	10–6	
Feb 28	Florida*	Dick Howser Stadium • Tallahassee, FL	W 9–7	11–6	

March
Date	Opponent	Site/stadium	Score	Overall record	ACC record
Mar 1	Florida*	Dick Howser Stadium • Tallahassee, FL	L 5–10^{10}	11–7	
Mar 3	UNC Greensboro*	Dick Howser Stadium • Tallahassee, FL	W 13–1	12–7	
Mar 4	UNC Greensboro*	Dick Howser Stadium • Tallahassee, FL	W 13–4	13–7	
Mar 6	NC State	Dick Howser Stadium • Tallahassee, FL	W 9–0	14–7	1–0
Mar 9	at South Florida*	Red McEwen Field • Tampa, FL	W 8–4	15–7	
Mar 10	vs LIU Brooklyn*	Jackie Robinson Ballpark • Daytona Beach, FL	W 11–0	16–7	
Mar 11	vs St. Joseph's*	Jackie Robinson Ballpark • Daytona Beach, FL	W 16–1	17–7	
Mar 13	at Wake Forest	Gene Hooks Stadium • Winston-Salem, NC	W 12–11	18–7	2–0
Mar 14	at Wake Forest	Gene Hooks Stadium • Winston-Salem, NC	W 10–4	19–7	3–0
Mar 15	at Wake Forest	Gene Hooks Stadium • Winston-Salem, NC	W 9–6	20–7	4–0
Mar 17	Morehead State*	Dick Howser Stadium • Tallahassee, FL	W 9–1	21–7	
Mar 20	Duke	Dick Howser Stadium • Tallahassee, FL	W 6–5	22–7	5–0
Mar 21	Duke	Dick Howser Stadium • Tallahassee, FL	W 9–4	23–7	6–0
Mar 22	Duke	Dick Howser Stadium • Tallahassee, FL	W 10–9	24–7	7–0
Mar 24	Florida Atlantic*	Dick Howser Stadium • Tallahassee, FL	W 15–3	25–7	
Mar 25	Florida Atlantic*	Dick Howser Stadium • Tallahassee, FL	W 7–5	26–7	
Mar 26	Maryland	Dick Howser Stadium • Tallahassee, FL	L 6–14	26–8	7–1
Mar 27	Maryland	Dick Howser Stadium • Tallahassee, FL	W 14–2	27–8	8–1
Mar 28	Maryland	Dick Howser Stadium • Tallahassee, FL	W 10–0	28–8	9–1
Mar 31	Mercer*	Dick Howser Stadium • Tallahassee, FL	W 13–3	29–8	

April
Date	Opponent	Site/stadium	Score	Overall record	ACC record
Apr 1	Mercer*	Dick Howser Stadium • Tallahassee, FL	W 11–0	30–8	
Apr 3	Miami (FL)*	Dick Howser Stadium • Tallahassee, FL	L 4–9	30–9	
Apr 4	Miami (FL)*	Dick Howser Stadium • Tallahassee, FL	L 2–8	30–10	
Apr 5	Miami (FL)*	Dick Howser Stadium • Tallahassee, FL	L 6–9	30–11	
Apr 8	Jacksonville*	Dick Howser Stadium • Tallahassee, FL	W 4–3	31–11	
Apr 10	at North Carolina	Boshamer Stadium • Chapel Hill, NC	L 5–6	31–12	9–2
Apr 11	at North Carolina	Boshamer Stadium • Chapel Hill, NC	W 20–4	32–12	10–2
Apr 12	at North Carolina	Boshamer Stadium • Chapel Hill, NC	W 4–3	33–12	11–2
Apr 15	at Jacksonville*	John Sessions Stadium • Jacksonville, FL	W 11–4	34–12	
Apr 17	Georgia Tech	Dick Howser Stadium • Tallahassee, FL	W 3–2	35–12	12–2
Apr 18	Georgia Tech	Dick Howser Stadium • Tallahassee, FL	W 8–3	36–12	13–2
Apr 19	Georgia Tech	Dick Howser Stadium • Tallahassee, FL	W 10–5	37–12	14–2
Apr 21	Southwestern Louisiana*	Dick Howser Stadium • Tallahassee, FL	W 14–4	38–12	
Apr 22	Southwestern Louisiana*	Dick Howser Stadium • Tallahassee, FL	W 13–1	39–12	
Apr 24	at Clemson	Beautiful Tiger Field • Clemson, SC	L 1–2	39–13	14–3
Apr 25	at Clemson	Beautiful Tiger Field • Clemson, SC	L 4–5	39–14	14–4
Apr 26	at Clemson	Beautiful Tiger Field • Clemson, SC	W 7–2	40–14	15–4

May
Date	Opponent	Site/stadium	Score	Overall record	ACC record
May 1	at Miami (FL)*	Mark Light Field • Coral Gables, FL	L 1–7	40–15	
May 2	at Miami (FL)*	Mark Light Field • Coral Gables, FL	W 11–5	41–15	
May 3	at Miami (FL)*	Mark Light Field • Coral Gables, FL	W 5–4	42–15	
May 6	Saint Leo*	Dick Howser Stadium • Tallahassee, FL	L 8–11	42–16	
May 9	at Virginia	UVA Baseball Field • Charlottesville, VA	W 5–4	43–16	16–4
May 9	at Virginia	UVA Baseball Field • Charlottesville, VA	W 11–2	44–16	17–4
May 10	at Virginia	UVA Baseball Field • Charlottesville, VA	W 9–6	45–16	18–4

Postseason

ACC Tournament
Date	Opponent	Seed	Site/stadium	Score	Overall record	ACCT Record
May 15	(9) Virginia	(1)	Durham Bulls Athletic Park • Durham, NC	W 4–1	46–16	1–0
May 16	(5) Wake Forest	(1)	Durham Bulls Athletic Park • Durham, NC	W 14–1	47–16	2–0
May 17	(6) North Carolina	(1)	Durham Bulls Athletic Park • Durham, NC	W 13–11	48–16	3–0
May 18	(4) NC State	(1)	Durham Bulls Athletic Park • Durham, NC	W 13–6	49–16	4–0
May 18	(5) Wake Forest	(1)	Durham Bulls Athletic Park • Durham, NC	L 1–2	49–17	4–1
May 19	5) Wake Forest	(1)	Durham Bulls Athletic Park • Durham, NC	L 3–6	49–18	4–2

NCAA Atlantic II Regional
Date	Opponent	Seed	Site/stadium	Score	Overall record	NCAAT record
May 23	(6) Liberty	(1)	Dick Howser Stadium • Tallahassee, FL	W 10–7	50–18	1–0
May 24	(3) Delaware	(1)	Dick Howser Stadium • Tallahassee, FL	W 27–6	51–18	2–0
May 25	(4) Oklahoma	(1)	Dick Howser Stadium • Tallahassee, FL	W 23–2	52–18	3–0
May 26	(2) Auburn	(1)	Dick Howser Stadium • Tallahassee, FL	W 16–10	53–18	4–0

College World Series
Date	Opponent	Seed	Site/stadium	Score	Overall record	CWS record
May 29	(6) Arizona State	(2)	Johnny Rosenblatt Stadium • Omaha, NE	L 10–11	53–19	0–1
May 31	(7) Long Beach State	(2)	Johnny Rosenblatt Stadium • Omaha, NE	L 4–7	53–20	0–2
