= Josh Fogg =

American baseball player (born 1976)

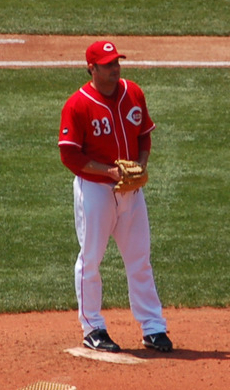
- Fogg pitching for the Reds in 2008
- Pitcher
- Born: December 13, 1976 (age 49); Lynn, Massachusetts, U.S.
- Batted: Right Threw: Right

MLB debut
- September 2, 2001, for the Chicago White Sox

Last MLB appearance
- October 4, 2009, for the Colorado Rockies

MLB statistics
- Win–loss record: 62–69
- Earned run average: 5.03
- Strikeouts: 627
- Stats at Baseball Reference

Teams
- Chicago White Sox (2001); Pittsburgh Pirates (2002–2005); Colorado Rockies (2006–2007); Cincinnati Reds (2008); Colorado Rockies (2009)

Joshua Smith Fogg (born December 13, 1976) is an American former professional baseball pitcher who played for several Major League Baseball (MLB) teams between 2001 and 2009. Fogg played college baseball for the University of Florida and was drafted by the Chicago White Sox in the third round of the 1998 Major League Baseball draft. He made his Major League debut for the White Sox on September 2, 2001, and also played for the Pittsburgh Pirates, Colorado Rockies and Cincinnati Reds.

== Early years ==
Fogg was born in Lynn, Massachusetts, in 1976. He attended Cardinal Gibbons High School in Fort Lauderdale, Florida, and played for the Cardinal Gibbons Chiefs high school baseball team.

== College career ==
Fogg accepted an athletic scholarship to attend the University of Florida in Gainesville, Florida, where he played for coach Andy Lopez's Florida Gators baseball team from 1995 to 1998. In 1996, he played collegiate summer baseball for the Hyannis Mets of the Cape Cod Baseball League and was named a league all-star. As a senior in 1998, he was recognized as a first-team All-American by Baseball America, Collegiate Baseball and the National Collegiate Baseball Writers Association. Fogg was inducted into the University of Florida Athletic Hall of Fame as a "Gator Great" in 2013.

== Professional career ==
=== Chicago White Sox ===
Fogg began his career with the Chicago White Sox for which he appeared in 11 games in 2001. He was traded along with Sean Lowe to the Pittsburgh Pirates for Todd Ritchie.

=== Pittsburgh Pirates ===
In 2002, Fogg pitched in 33 starts as a rookie for the Pirates, finishing tied for first with 12 wins alongside his teammate Kip Wells and finishing second in innings pitched on the team. He finished 7th in Rookie of the Year balloting.

2003 was a down year as Fogg suffered an abdominal injury. He would only appear in 26 starts and finished with 10 wins. Although he reached double digit wins, his ERA finished at 5.26 while allowing 22 home runs in only 143 innings.

In 2004, Fogg notched 11 wins, reaching double digit wins for the third consecutive season, and allowed a career low 17 home runs in 32 starts.

2005 saw Fogg demoted to the bullpen for a time as he struggled throughout the season. He pitched in 34 games, 28 of them starts, and finished with a record of 6-11 while having an ERA over 5.

=== Colorado Rockies ===
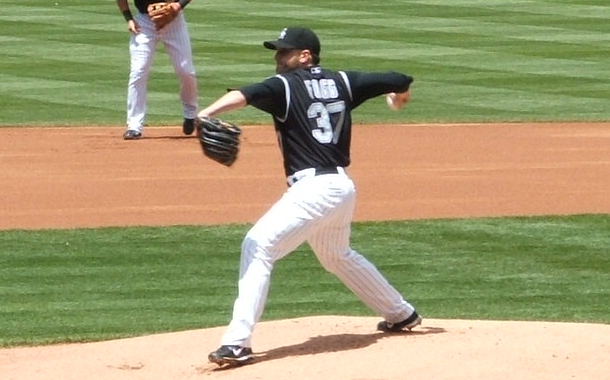
Fogg with the Colorado Rockies in 2007

Fogg signed with the Rockies in 2006. That season, he went 11–9 with a 5.49 ERA in 31 starts. In Coors Field, he was 6-4 despite having an ERA over 6.00 in 15 starts. On June 30, 2006, against the Seattle Mariners at Safeco Field in Seattle, Washington, Fogg threw a two-hit complete game shutout while facing the minimum 27 batters. All three Mariners who reached base (Adrián Beltré and Kenji Johjima on singles and Raúl Ibañez on a walk) were erased on double plays by infielders Garrett Atkins, Clint Barmes, Jamey Carroll, and Todd Helton.

In 2007, Fogg finished with a record of 10–9 in 30 games. During the 2007 season, He acquired the nickname "Dragon Slayer" after he pitched and won against many of the best pitchers in the majors including Brandon Webb and Curt Schilling. Fogg pitched in three games in the 2007 playoffs, going 2–1. His loss came in the World Series against the Boston Red Sox, who pounded Fogg for 6 runs on 10 hits in less than 3 innings.

=== Cincinnati Reds ===
On February 21, 2008, Fogg signed a one-year deal with the Cincinnati Reds. In his lone season with the Reds, his record was 2–7 with a career worst 7.58 ERA in 22 games for the Reds.

=== Second stint with Colorado ===
After the 2008 season, Fogg signed a minor league deal with the Rockies. He was called up after making eight starts in AAA. Once called up by the Rockies, he pitched mostly out of the bullpen, appearing in a total of 24 games with 1 start.

=== Philadelphia Phillies ===
On January 29, 2010, Fogg signed a minor league contract with the New York Mets with an invite to spring training. He was released on March 20. Fogg signed a minor league contract with the Philadelphia Phillies on March 31, 2010, but was released on July 2 after sporting an ERA over 10 in just 3 starts. Soon after his release, he retired from baseball.

== See also ==
- 1998 College Baseball All-America Team
- Florida Gators
- List of Florida Gators baseball players
- List of University of Florida Athletic Hall of Fame members
