= Bubba Crosby =

American baseball player (born 1976)

- Outfielder
- Born: August 11, 1976 (age 49); Bellaire, Texas, U.S.
- Batted: Left Threw: Left

MLB debut
- May 29, 2003, for the Los Angeles Dodgers

Last MLB appearance
- August 3, 2006, for the New York Yankees

MLB statistics
- Batting average: .216
- Home runs: 4
- Runs batted in: 20
- Stats at Baseball Reference

Teams
- Los Angeles Dodgers (2003); New York Yankees (2004–2006)

Richard Stephen "Bubba" Crosby (born August 11, 1976) is an American former professional baseball outfielder who played in Major League Baseball for the Los Angeles Dodgers and the New York Yankees from 2003 to 2006.

== Name ==
He became Bubba when he was born and his 15-month-old sister, Charmin, could not say "brother". The name stuck. But as he said, "almost everyone in Texas is Bubba when you're growing up." He said when he got to be dating age, "I tried to change it in school, call myself Richard, but kids would call for me and ask for Richard, and my parents would burst out laughing and say, 'You mean Bubba?'"

== High school and college ==
Crosby was a star at baseball powerhouse Bellaire High School in Bellaire, Texas, from 1991 to 1995. He won a Texas 5-A sports state high school championship with Bellaire. His pitching coach was Ray Knoblach, father of major leaguer Chuck Knoblauch.

Crosby attended Rice University and played college baseball for the Rice Owls from 1996 to 1998. He earned All-American honors in 1997 and 1998. In 1998, he hit 25 home runs and drove in 91 runs in only 221 at bats, and batted .394 with a .504 on-base percentage and a .828 slugging percentage. He also had a 30-game hitting streak. He is the all-time Rice leader with 20 career triples, and 2nd with 59 home runs, 243 RBIs, 499 total bases, and a .737 slugging percentage, trailing only Lance Berkman in each category. In 2015, he was inducted into the Rice Athletics Hall of Fame.

== Professional career ==
=== Los Angeles Dodgers (1998–2003) ===
The Los Angeles Dodgers selected Crosby in the first round with the 23rd overall selection of the 1998 Major League Baseball draft.

His best seasons in the minors in the Dodgers' system were 1999 (.296 with 19 stolen bases in A+ ball), 2000 (27 stolen bases in A+ ball), 2001 (.302 with 22 stolen bases in Double-A), and 2003 (.361 in Triple-A).

Crosby was finally called up by the Dodgers in 2003, while he was batting .361 with a .410 on-base percentage and .635 slugging percentage (1.045 OPS) in AAA. Nevertheless, he still struggled to find significant time in the majors as the Dodgers favored Rickey Henderson in a reserve role over him. Following a dozen at bats in Los Angeles, he was traded to the New York Yankees on July 31, 2003, along with Scott Proctor for Robin Ventura.

=== New York Yankees (2004–06) ===
Crosby played primarily as a starting outfielder (mostly in RF—where he has never made an error in the Major Leagues—and CF) for the Yankees.

==== 2004 ====
In 2004, after having made the team due to a strong spring training performance in which he hit .385 with two home runs and eleven RBIs, Crosby gained a large amount of media and fan attention when, in his first series against the Chicago White Sox, he hit two home runs with five RBI in first five at-bats and made a diving catch. Notably, the first home run came in his first at bat as a Yankee and the second secured Mike Mussina's 200th career win. Nevertheless, upon the return of outfielder Kenny Lofton from the disabled list, Crosby was sent down to minors. He would be called up several times. Crosby ultimately received only 53 at-bats on the season, hitting .151 overall. He made both the ALDS and ALCS rosters as a reserve outfielder and pinch runner.

==== 2005 ====
In 2005, Crosby performed well in spring training again and made the team for the second year in a row. However, he again found difficulty staying in the majors throughout the season. By July 20, he had only started two games. Crosby returned to the Yankees wearing jersey number 18 because his previous number, 19, had been assigned to the newly acquired Al Leiter.

Crosby's season made a dramatic turn for the better in the final month of the season, however. After having worked with Don Mattingly to shorten his swing, Crosby finished his 2005 season with the strongest performance of his career. He hit .321 in 23 September games while consistently starting and .345 (20 for 58) over his final 31 games of the season. On September 19, 2005, in his first start of the year against a left-handed pitcher, he hit his career first walk-off home run, against Eric DuBose of the Baltimore Orioles, leading off the bottom of the 9th inning by sending a breaking ball over the right-center field fence.

On October 10, 2005, Crosby, after having started several postseason games, was involved in a collision in Game 5 of the 2005 ALDS against the Los Angeles Angels of Anaheim. With the Yankees up 2–1, the Angels had runners on first and second with two outs when Adam Kennedy hit a pitch off Mike Mussina deep into right-center. Crosby and right-fielder Gary Sheffield collided while trying to catch the ball, allowing two runs to score and give the Angels a 3–2 lead. The Angels would go on to win the game 5–3 and continue to the ALCS. Crosby finished the season having hit .276 over 76 games.

==== 2006 ====
During the offseason, Yankees general manager Brian Cashman initially stated that Crosby would be the Yankees starting center fielder in 2006. Nevertheless, upon the large signing of Johnny Damon in December, he was again put in a reserve role and ceded his number 18 to Damon. Though he again made the team's opening roster, he lost almost a month on the 15 Day Disabled list from mid-May to June. After having appeared in 65 games, on August 4, 2006, Crosby was designated for assignment by the Yankees. He cleared waivers on August 9, however, and reported back to the Clippers, remaining in the Yankee organization. He became a 6-year Minor League free agent after the season.

=== Cincinnati Reds (2007) ===
On November 10, 2006, the Cincinnati Reds signed Crosby for the 2007 season. Crosby agreed to a one-year contract that paid $400,000 while he was in the majors, and $75,000 in the minors. "We're getting a guy that's been on winning teams, that plays the game the right way, that always plays it hard and can play all three outfield positions," Reds general manager Wayne Krivsky said. "We're happy to have him."

Crosby hit .276 in 16 games in spring training with 1 homer and 7 RBI. Crosby was sent to the Triple-A affiliate Louisville Bats on March 24, 2007. "We just felt he was behind a couple of other guys for that spot," Krivsky said. Louisville placed Crosby on the disabled list after 13 games. The diagnosis was left shoulder tendinitis. Conservative treatment was unsuccessful, and on July 20, in Cincinnati, he had season-ending surgery on his shoulder. The Reds granted Crosby free agency in October 2007.

=== Seattle Mariners (2008) ===
On February 19, 2008, Crosby signed a minor league contract with the Seattle Mariners. On March 7, he was released for failing a physical. The reason for his failure was not disclosed. He has since retired from baseball.

== Awards ==
- 1996 - Freshman 1st-Team All-American OF
- 1997 - Summer League 1st-Team All-American OF
- 1997 - Western Athletic Conference All-Star OF
- 1998 - 1st-Team College All-American OF
- 1998 - Western Athletic Conference All-Star OF
- 2001 - Southern League All-Star OF
- 2003 - Pacific Coast League Player of the Month, May
- 2003 - Pacific Coast League All-Star OF
- 2004 - James Dawson Award (given to the top rookie at the Yankees spring training camp)
