= Eric Munson =

American baseball player (born 1977)

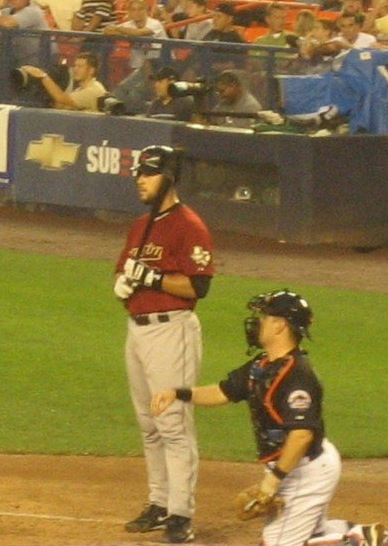
- Munson batting for the Houston Astros
- Third baseman / Catcher
- Born: October 3, 1977 (age 48); San Diego, California, U.S.
- Batted: Left Threw: Right

MLB debut
- July 18, 2000, for the Detroit Tigers

Last MLB appearance
- September 21, 2009, for the Oakland Athletics

MLB statistics
- Batting average: .214
- Home runs: 49
- Runs batted in: 147
- Stats at Baseball Reference

Teams
- Detroit Tigers (2000–2004); Tampa Bay Devil Rays (2005); Houston Astros (2006–2007); Oakland Athletics (2009)

Eric Walter Munson (born October 3, 1977) is an American former professional baseball catcher and current coach. He played in Major League Baseball (MLB) from 2000 to 2009 for the Detroit Tigers, Tampa Bay Devil Rays, Houston Astros, and Oakland Athletics. He was the third overall pick in the 1999 MLB draft by the Tigers, behind Josh Hamilton and Josh Beckett.

== Amateur career ==
Munson graduated from San Diego's Mount Carmel High School where he played baseball with former major league third baseman Eric Chavez. Munson was named to the All-America First Team by the American Baseball Coaches Association and Rawlings. Munson was first drafted out of high school in 1996 by the Atlanta Braves, who chose him 62nd overall in the 2nd round. Munson however did not sign, opting to play college baseball at the University of Southern California, where he was named Freshman All-American. Among Munson's USC teammates were future Astros teammates Jason Lane and Morgan Ensberg. After three seasons at USC, Munson was drafted third overall in the 1st round of the 1999 amateur draft by the Detroit Tigers.

== Professional career ==
=== Detroit Tigers ===
==== Minor leagues ====
The Tigers signed Munson to a $3.50 million signing bonus, a team record until Rick Porcello was signed for $3.58 million in 2007. Despite playing the catcher position in high school and college, the Tigers had drafted Munson mostly for his hitting skills, and the decision was made to shift him to first base. Although his batting average was merely average (.260s), Munson hit for power in the minor leagues, and was named to the Midwest League All Star Team in 1999 and the Eastern League All Star Team in 2001. In 2002, while playing for the Toledo Mud Hens, Munson was named the Detroit Tigers Minor League Player of the Year.

==== Major leagues ====
Munson began his major league career with the Detroit Tigers, making his debut in July 2000 for a week. He then was a September call up, and made appearances in three games. He also made September appearances in 2001 and 2002. During spring training prior to the 2003 season, Munson was asked to try the third base position, as the Tigers had previously acquired Carlos Peña and Dmitri Young, both of whom were slated to play first base or designated hitter. The club's regular third baseman, Dean Palmer, was dealing with numerous injuries and would not be available. Munson would go on to play in 91 games at third. On June 26, 2004, he hit what was then the longest home run in the history of Comerica Park off of Arizona Diamondbacks pitcher Brandon Villafuerte. It currently places tied for 2nd longest. The ball traveled an estimated 457 feet, striking the center field camera well at the concourse level. Munson was granted free agency at the end of the season.

=== Tampa Bay Devil Rays ===
Munson signed with the Minnesota Twins in early 2005, but was released during spring training. Munson soon thereafter signed with the Tampa Bay Devil Rays' Triple-A affiliate, the Durham Bulls, where he again played first base. Munson also appeared in 11 games for the Devil Rays.

=== Houston Astros ===
Prior to the 2006 season, Munson was signed as a minor league free agent by the Houston Astros. With Houston, he backed up Brad Ausmus at catcher, the position he played in college at USC. On August 20, 2006, Munson was designated for assignment by the Astros and he accepted a demotion to their Triple-A affiliate, the Round Rock Express, in the Pacific Coast League. He returned to Houston when the major league rosters expanded in September. Munson again signed a minor league contract with the Express for 2007, and began the season in the minors. Due to the injury to Astros catcher Héctor Giménez, Munson was recalled to the major league roster on June 2, 2007.

=== Milwaukee Brewers ===
The Milwaukee Brewers claimed Munson off waivers on October 15, 2007. On March 26, he was sent outright to the Brewers' Triple-A affiliate, the Nashville Sounds. There, he split his time between first base and catcher. He became a free agent at the end of the season.

=== Oakland Athletics ===
Munson signed a minor league deal with the Oakland Athletics on March 27, 2009 and reported to the Athletics' Triple-A affiliate, the Sacramento River Cats. On September 11, 2009, Munson's contract was purchased from triple-A and he joined the A's as a September call-up. In October 2009, Munson was granted free agency.

=== San Diego Padres ===
On February 25, 2010, Munson signed a minor league contract with the San Diego Padres. On July 6, the Portland Beavers (the Padres' Double-A affiliate) released Munson.

=== Newark Bears ===
In August 2010, Munson signed to play for the Newark Bears of the independent Atlantic League of Professional Baseball.

== Post-playing career ==
In September 2011, Munson joined the USC baseball coaching staff as an undergrad assistant coach under head coach Frank Cruz.

Munson joined the University of Dubuque Baseball staff as an assistant coach for the 2013 season. Munson will primarily work with the hitters and catchers while also providing a wealth of knowledge and on the field experience.

Munson opened up his own training facility, Gold Standard Athletics by Eric Munson, in the fall of 2013. He also coached for the 18U USA Baseball National Team where they won a gold medal in Taiwan.

Before the 2022 season, Munson was named hitting coach for the Pittsburgh Pirates' Triple–A affiliate, the Indianapolis Indians.
