= 1998 Major League Baseball draft =

Baseball draft of amateur players by Major League Baseball

General information
- Date: June 2–3, 1998

Overview
- First selection: Pat Burrell; Philadelphia Phillies
- Hall of Famers: 1: P CC Sabathia

The 1998 Major League Baseball draft, was the choosing of high school and college baseball players, held on June 2 and 3, 1998. A total of 1445 players were drafted over the course of 50 rounds.

== First round selections ==
| = All-Star |

| Pick | Player | Team | Position | School |
|---|---|---|---|---|
| 1 | Pat Burrell | Philadelphia Phillies | 1B | Miami (FL) |
| 2 | Mark Mulder | Oakland Athletics | P | Michigan State |
| 3 | Corey Patterson | Chicago Cubs | OF | Harrison High School (GA) |
| 4 | Jeff Austin | Kansas City Royals | P | Stanford |
| 5 | J. D. Drew | St. Louis Cardinals | OF | Florida State |
| 6 | Ryan Mills | Minnesota Twins | P | Arizona State |
| 7 | Austin Kearns | Cincinnati Reds | OF | Lafayette High School (KY) |
| 8 | Felipe López | Toronto Blue Jays | 3B | Lake Brantley High School (FL) |
| 9 | Sean Burroughs | San Diego Padres | 3B | Woodrow Wilson Classical High School (CA) |
| 10 | Carlos Peña | Texas Rangers | 1B | Northeastern |
| 11 | Josh McKinley | Montreal Expos | SS | Malvern Prep School (PA) |
| 12 | Adam Everett | Boston Red Sox | SS | South Carolina |
| 13 | J.M. Gold | Milwaukee Brewers | P | Toms River High School (NJ) |
| 14 | Jeff Weaver | Detroit Tigers | P | Fresno State |
| 15 | Clint Johnston | Pittsburgh Pirates | 1B | Vanderbilt |
| 16 | Kip Wells | Chicago White Sox | P | Baylor |
| 17 | Brad Lidge | Houston Astros (Note: Pick from Colorado Rockies as compensation for signing of free agent Darryl Kile) | P | Notre Dame |
| 18 | Seth Etherton | Anaheim Angels | P | USC |
| 19 | Tony Torcato | San Francisco Giants (Note: Pick from Houston Astros as compensation for signing of free agent Doug Henry) | OF | Woodland High School (CA) |
| 20 | CC Sabathia | Cleveland Indians | P | Vallejo High School (CA) |
| 21 | Jason Tyner | New York Mets | OF | Texas A&M |
| 22 | Matt Thornton | Seattle Mariners | P | Grand Valley State |
| 23 | Bubba Crosby | Los Angeles Dodgers | OF | Rice |
| 24 | Andy Brown | New York Yankees | OF | Richmond High School (IN) |
| 25 | Nate Bump | San Francisco Giants | P | Penn State |
| 26 | Rick Elder | Baltimore Orioles | OF | Sprayberry High School (GA) |
| 27 | Chip Ambres | Florida Marlins | OF | West Brook High School (TX) |
| 28 | Matt Roney | Colorado Rockies (Note: Pick from Atlanta Braves as compensation for signing of free agent Andres Galarraga) | P | Edmond North High School (OK) |
| 29 | Arturo McDowell | San Francisco Giants (Note: Pick from Tampa Bay Devil Rays as compensation for signing of free agent Roberto Hernández) | OF | Forest Hill High School (MS) |
| 30 | Matt Burch | Kansas City Royals (Note: Pick from Arizona Diamondbacks as compensation for signing of free agent Jay Bell) | P | VCU |

== Supplemental first round selections ==
| Pick | Player | Team | Position | School |
|---|---|---|---|---|
| 31 | Chris George | Kansas City Royals (Note: Supplemental pick for loss of free agent Jay Bell) | P | Klein High School (TX) |
| 32 | Ben Diggins | St. Louis Cardinals (Note: Supplemental pick for loss of free agent Dennis Eckersley) | P | Bradshaw Mountain High School (AZ) |
| 33 | Brad Wilkerson | Montreal Expos (Note: Supplemental pick for loss of free agent Darrin Fletcher) | OF | Florida |
| 34 | Nate Cornejo | Detroit Tigers (Note: Supplemental pick for loss of free agent Willie Blair) | P | Wellington High School (KS) |
| 35 | Aaron Rowand | Chicago White Sox (Note: Supplemental pick for loss of free agent Dave Martinez) | OF | Cal State Fullerton |
| 36 | Raphael Freeman | Colorado Rockies (Note: Supplemental pick for loss of free agent Andres Galarraga) | OF | Dallas Christian School (TX) |
| 37 | Mike Nannini | Houston Astros (Note: Supplemental pick for loss of free agent Darryl Kile) | P | Green Valley High School (NV) |
| 38 | Chris Jones | San Francisco Giants (Note: Supplemental pick for loss of free agent Roberto Hernández) | P | South Mecklenburg High School (NC) |
| 39 | Mamon Tucker | Baltimore Orioles (Note: Supplemental pick for loss of free agent Randy Myers) | OF | Stephen F. Austin High School (TX) |
| 40 | Jeff Winchester | Colorado Rockies (Note: Supplemental pick for loss of free agent Walt Weiss) | C | Archbishop Rummel High School (LA) |
| 41 | Jeff Urban | San Francisco Giants (Note: Supplemental pick for loss of free agent Wilson Álvarez) | P | Ball State |
| 42 | Eric Valent | Philadelphia Phillies (Note: Supplemental pick for failure to sign 1997 No. 1 pick J. D. Drew) | OF | UCLA |
| 43 | Mark Prior | New York Yankees (Note: Supplemental pick for failure to sign 1997 No. 1 pick Tyrell Godwin) | P | University High School (CA) |

== Other notable players ==
- Gerald Laird, 2nd round, 45th overall by the Oakland Athletics
- Adam Dunn, 2nd round, 50th overall by the Cincinnati Reds
- Matt Belisle, 2nd round, 52nd overall by the Atlanta Braves
- Brandon Inge, 2nd round, 57th overall by the Detroit Tigers
- Jody Gerut, 2nd round, 71st overall by the Colorado Rockies
- Barry Zito, 3rd round, 83rd overall by the Texas Rangers, but did not sign
- Mike Maroth, 3rd round, 85th overall by the Boston Red Sox
- Josh Fogg, 3rd round, 89th overall by the Chicago White Sox
- Ryan Langerhans, 3rd round, 101st overall by the Atlanta Braves
- Jason Michaels, 4th round, 104th overall by the Philadelphia Phillies
- Eddy Furniss, 4th round, 118th overall by the Pittsburgh Pirates
- Javier López, 4th round, 133rd overall by the Arizona Diamondbacks
- Scott Proctor, 5th round, 156th overall by the Los Angeles Dodgers
- Ryan Vogelsong, 5th round, 158th overall by the San Francisco Giants
- Aubrey Huff, 5th round, 162nd overall by the Tampa Bay Devil Rays
- Bill Hall, 6th round, 176th overall by the Milwaukee Brewers
- Matt Holliday, 7th round, 210th overall by the Colorado Rockies
- John Buck, 7th round, 212th overall by the Houston Astros
- David Ross, 7th round, 216th overall by the Los Angeles Dodgers
- Eric Byrnes, 8th round, 225th overall by the Oakland Athletics
- Will Ohman, 8th round, 226th overall by the Chicago Cubs
- Andrew Good, 8th round, 251st by the Arizona Diamondbacks
- Joe Kennedy, 8th round, 252nd overall by the Tampa Bay Devil Rays
- Ryan Madson, 9th round, 254th overall by the Philadelphia Phillies
- Jack Wilson, 9th round, 258th overall by the St. Louis Cardinals
- Mark Teixeira, 9th round, 265th overall by the Boston Red Sox, but did not sign
- Morgan Ensberg, 9th round, 272nd overall by the Houston Astros
- Juan Pierre, 13th round, 390th overall by the Colorado Rockies
- Jay Gibbons, 14th round, 411th overall by the Toronto Blue Jays
- Eric Hinske, 17th round, 496th overall by the Chicago Cubs
- J. J. Putz, 17th round, 499th overall by the Minnesota Twins, but did not sign
- B. J. Ryan, 17th round, 500th overall by the Cincinnati Reds
- Brian Lawrence, 17th round, 502nd overall by the San Diego Padres
- Ty Wigginton, 17th round, 514th overall by the New York Mets
- Mike MacDougal, 17th round, 519th overall by the Baltimore Orioles, but did not sign
- Joe Beimel, 18th round, 538th overall by the Pittsburgh Pirates
- Adam LaRoche, 18th round, 550th overall by the Florida Marlins, but did not sign
- Cliff Lee, 20th round, 609th overall by the Baltimore Orioles, but did not sign
- Nick Punto, 21st round, 614th overall by the Philadelphia Phillies
- Bobby Crosby, 34th round, 1021st overall by the Anaheim Angels, but did not sign
- Mark Buehrle, 38th round, 1139th overall by the Chicago White Sox
- Todd Coffey, 41st round, 1220th overall by the Cincinnati Reds
- Nyjer Morgan, 42nd round, 1260th overall by the Colorado Rockies, but did not sign
- Mike Jacobs, 48th round, 1413th overall by the Tampa Bay Devil Rays, but did not sign

=== NFL players drafted ===
- Chad Hutchinson, 2nd round, 48th overall by the St. Louis Cardinals
- Drew Henson, 3rd round, 97th overall by the New York Yankees
- Earnest Graham, 43rd round, 1273rd overall by the Philadelphia Phillies, but did not sign

== See also ==
- Major League Baseball
- Major League Baseball draft
- List of MLB first overall draft choices
- Rule 5 draft

| Preceded by Matt Anderson | 1st Overall Picks; Pat Burrell | Succeeded by Josh Hamilton |
