= Seth Etherton =

American baseball player (born 1976)

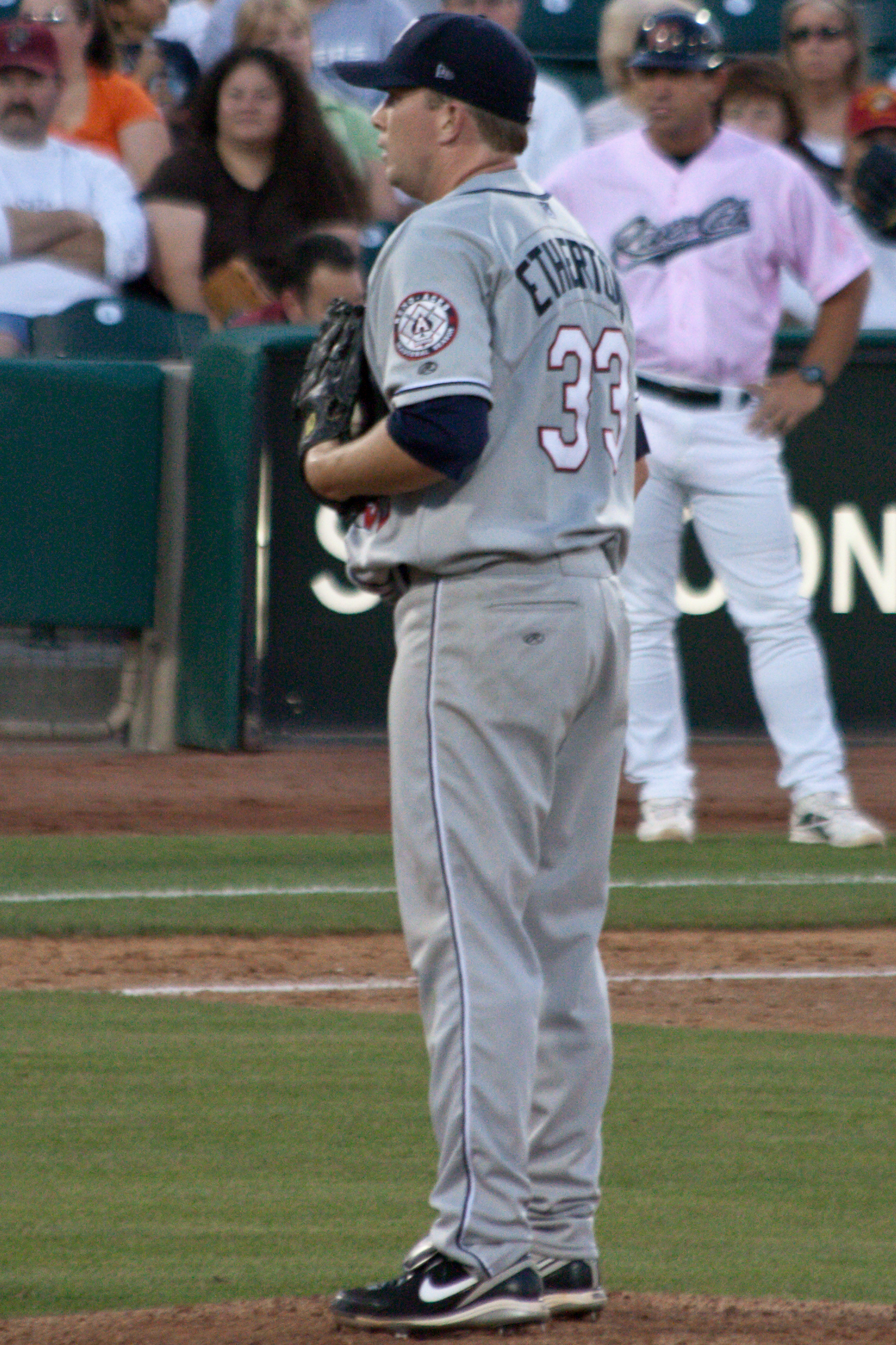
- Etherton with the Reno Aces in 2009

USC Trojans
- Pitcher / Coach
- Born: October 17, 1976 (age 49); Laguna Beach, California, U.S.
- Batted: Right Threw: Right

Professional debut
- MLB: May 26, 2000, for the Anaheim Angels
- KBO: April 10, 2007, for the Kia Tigers

Last appearance
- MLB: June 3, 2006, for the Kansas City Royals
- KBO: May 10, 2007, for the Kia Tigers

MLB statistics
- Win–loss record: 9–7
- Earned run average: 6.30
- Strikeouts: 63

KBO statistics
- Win–loss record: 2–2
- Earned run average: 4.22
- Strikeouts: 24

CPBL statistics
- Win–loss record: 3–2
- Earned run average: 2.50
- Strikeouts: 44
- Stats at Baseball Reference

Teams
- Anaheim Angels (2000); Cincinnati Reds (2003); Oakland Athletics (2005); Kansas City Royals (2006); Kia Tigers (2007); Uni-President 7-Eleven Lions (2011)

Career highlights and awards
- Taiwan Series champion (2011)

Seth Michael Etherton (born October 17, 1976) is an American baseball coach and former pitcher. He was a former pitching coach for the USC Trojans. He played college baseball at USC from 1995 to 1998. He played in Major League Baseball (MLB) for 4 seasons, with his longest tenure as a player coming with the Anaheim Angels.

Etherton was born in Laguna Beach, California. He attended Dana Hills High School in Dana Point, California. After graduating from Dana Hills, Etherton enrolled at USC, where he was a Three-time All-American, and twice named the Pac-10 Conference Baseball Pitcher of the Year.

The Anaheim Angels selected Etherton in the first round of the 1998 Major League Baseball draft. He played 4 seasons professionally as a pitcher in MLB, with Anaheim in 2000, the Cincinnati Reds in 2003, the Oakland Athletics in 2005, and Kansas City Royals in 2006. He also played professionally for the Kia Tigers (2007), and the Uni-President 7-Eleven Lions (2011).

== Amateur career ==
Etherton played at Dana Hills High School and the University of Southern California. In 1995 and 1996, he played collegiate summer baseball with the Chatham A's of the Cape Cod Baseball League, where he was named a league all-star in 1995, was instrumental in the team's 1996 league championship series victory, and was elected to the league's Hall of Fame in 2026. He was a 1st team College All-American at USC and helped the team win the 1998 College World Series.

== Professional career ==
=== Anaheim Angels ===
Etherton was drafted by the Anaheim Angels in the 1st round of the 1998 MLB draft. He made his major league debut on May 26, 2000, for the Angels against the Kansas City Royals. He started the game and pitched five innings while giving up three runs. He recorded his first win on June 13, 2000, against the Tampa Bay Devil Rays. He was 5–1 for the Angels in 11 starts in 2000 with a 5.52 ERA.

=== Cincinnati Reds ===
On December 10, 2000, he was traded by the Angels to the Cincinnati Reds for shortstop Wilmy Caceras. He missed all of the 2001 season and most of the 2002 season because of shoulder surgery and then made seven starts for the Reds in 2003. He was 2–4 with a 6.90 ERA in those appearances. He spent the entire 2004 season in the minor leagues with the AAA Louisville Bats.

=== Oakland Athletics ===
Etherton signed as a minor league free agent with the Oakland Athletics for the 2005 season. He spent most of the season with the AAA Sacramento River Cats but made three starts for the Athletics when Rich Harden was injured in May. He was 1–1 with a 6.63 ERA in those starts.

=== Kansas City Royals ===
He was signed as a minor league free agent by the Kansas City Royals in November 2005 and then selected in the minor league portion of the Rule 5 draft by the San Diego Padres. The Padres traded him back to the Royals on May 26, 2006, for cash. He was 1–1 with a 9.39 ERA in 2 starts with the Royals while spending most of the season with the AAA Omaha Royals.

=== 2007–2008 ===
In 2007, Etherton played for Kia Tigers in the Korea Baseball Organization and went 2–2 with a 4.22 ERA before being released. While in Korea, Etherton suffered from a mysterious stomach illness that may have led to his release. After his release and return to America, his symptoms subsided and he signed with the Florida Marlins organization. With the Marlins he made 1 appearance for the Jupiter Hammerheads and 2 for the Albuquerque Isotopes.

In 2008, he played 2 games for the Long Beach Armada in the independent Golden Baseball League.

=== Minor leagues ===
In December 2008, he signed a minor league contract with the Arizona Diamondbacks and played the entire season for the AAA Reno Aces, where he made 26 starts and was 11–8 with a 5.04 ERA.

In April 2010, he signed with the Los Angeles Dodgers and was assigned to the AAA Albuquerque Isotopes. He appeared in 19 games, with 17 starts, and finished 5–7 with a 5.33 ERA.

== Coaching career ==
Etherton served as the pitching coach for the Dayton Dragons. Etherton served as the pitching coach for the Louisville Bats, the Cincinnati Reds' Triple-A affiliate.

Etherton has served as the pitching coach for the USC Trojans. Etherton has also served as the pitching coach for the University of San Francisco.

On June 3, 2025, Etherton was announced as a coach for the United States national under-18 baseball team's development program in Cary, North Carolina.
