= Wes Rachels =

American baseball player

- Second baseman
- Born: January 19, 1976 (age 49); Los Angeles, California, U.S.
- Bats: Right Throws: Right

Career highlights and awards
- College World Series Most Outstanding Player (1998)

Wesley Adam Rachels (born January 19, 1976) is a former second baseman who won the 1998 College World Series Most Outstanding Player award while a senior at the University of Southern California.

== Amateur career ==
While at USC in 1996, he played collegiate summer baseball for the Hyannis Mets of the Cape Cod Baseball League.

In the 1998 College World Series, he set a championship game record with seven RBI, and tied another record with five hits in a game.

== Professional career ==
Rachels was drafted in the 33rd round of the 1998 amateur draft by the Philadelphia Phillies, playing professionally in 1998 and from 2000 to 2002, never reaching the major leagues. He began his professional career with the Batavia Muckdogs, hitting .301 with 16 RBI. He had a good eye at the plate, walking 18 times and striking out only 15 times in 133 at-bats. He missed the 1999 season.

For the remainder of his career, he'd play in the Baltimore Orioles organization. In 2000, he played for the Delmarva Shorebirds, hitting .260 with 46 RBI. He walked 96 times and had 58 strikeouts. He played for the Frederick Keys in 2001, hitting .261 with 26 RBI, 58 walks and only 52 strikeouts. 2002 was his final professional season. He spent it with the Bowie Baysox, hitting .201 with 21 walks and 33 strikeouts.

Overall, Rachels hit .254 in 340 minor league games. In 1062 at-bats, he did not hit a single home run, however he scored 139 runs and drove 107 in. He walked 193 times and struck out 158 times.

== Personal ==
Rachels is the nephew of New York Yankees great Ron Guidry.
