= Bobby Hill (baseball) =

American baseball player (born 1978)

- Second baseman / Third baseman
- Born: April 3, 1978 (age 48); San Jose, California, U.S.
- Batted: Switch Threw: Right

MLB debut
- May 10, 2002, for the Chicago Cubs

Last MLB appearance
- July 20, 2005, for the Pittsburgh Pirates

MLB statistics
- Batting average: .262
- Home runs: 6
- Runs batted in: 58
- Stats at Baseball Reference

Teams
- Chicago Cubs (2002–2003); Pittsburgh Pirates (2003–2005)

William Robert Hill (born April 3, 1978) is an American former professional baseball infielder. He played in Major League Baseball (MLB) for the Chicago Cubs and Pittsburgh Pirates.

Hill attended the University of Miami, where he played baseball, and was then drafted by the Chicago Cubs. In 2000, before playing for the Cubs organization, he played for the Newark Bears in the independent Atlantic League. He hit .326 with 13 home runs and 82 RBI. He also stole a team record 81 bases and walked a league record 101 times in 132 games.

When Hill reached the major leagues with the Cubs, he was assigned the number 17, becoming the first player to wear the number since Mark Grace, who had worn it from 1988 through 2000 with Chicago.

Hill was traded to the Pittsburgh Pirates as the centerpiece of the Aramis Ramírez trade in August 2003. With Pittsburgh in 2004, he hit .266 with two home runs and 27 RBI in a part-time role. He spent much of 2005 in Triple-A and was dealt to the San Diego Padres on November 21, 2005, for a player to be named later. Hill spent the 2006 season with the Triple-A Portland Beavers. Hill signed with the Newark Bears of the Atlantic League in February 2008, eight years after he began his professional career there. He hit .238 in 100 games. Hill played 24 games for the Bears in 2009. He signed with the Chico Outlaws of the Golden Baseball League for the 2010 season.

In March 2011, Hill was inducted into the University of Miami Sports Hall of Fame. From 2012 to 2014, Hill was head baseball coach at Los Gatos High School in Los Gatos, California, before becoming head coach at Mission College in Santa Clara in 2015. He has since taken over the role as the head coach at West Valley College.
