= Jason Lane =

American baseball player & coach (born 1976)

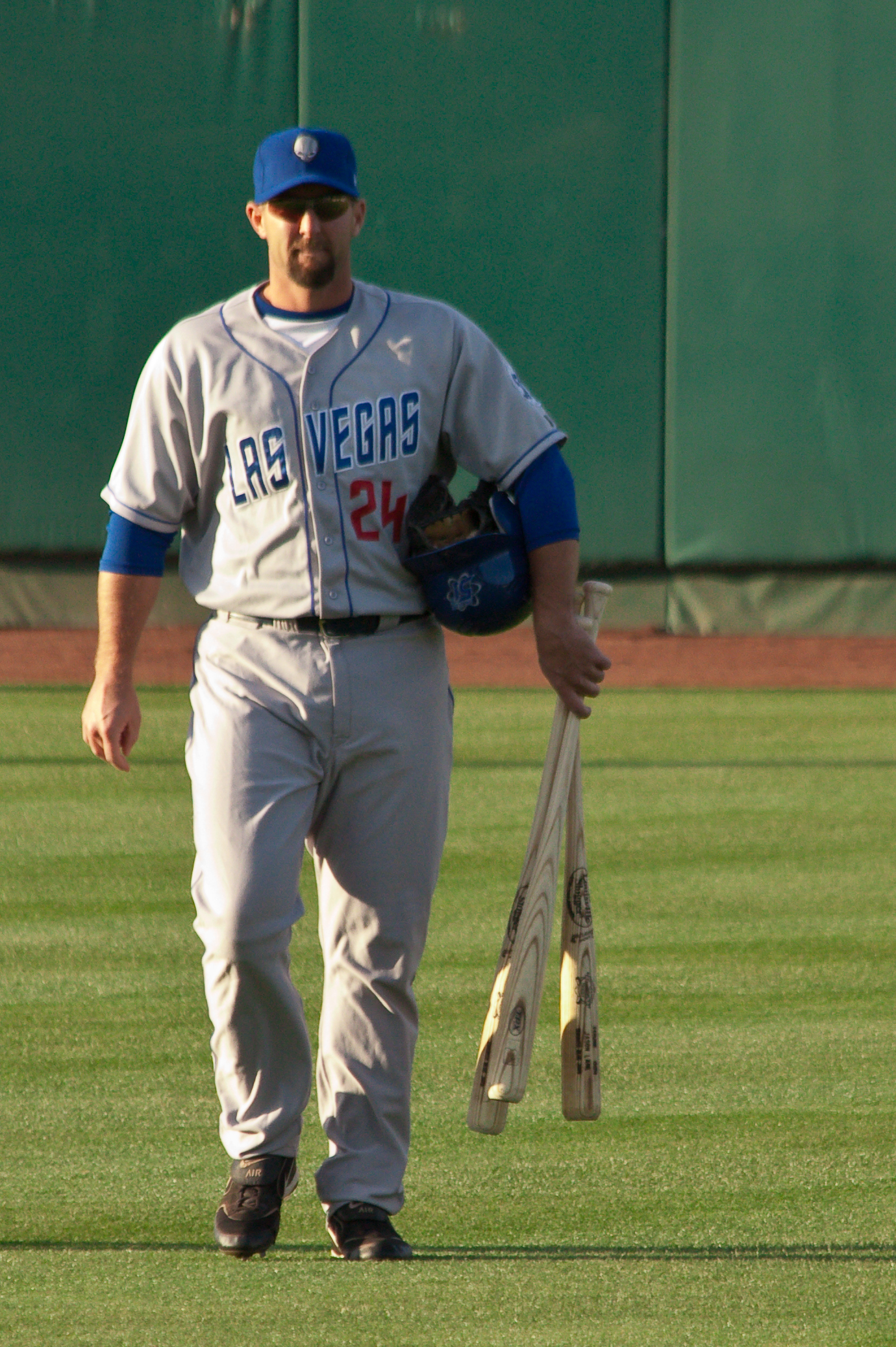
- Lane with the Las Vegas 51s

Milwaukee Brewers – No. 40
- Outfielder / Pitcher / Coach
- Born: December 22, 1976 (age 49); Santa Rosa, California, U.S.
- Batted: Right Threw: Left

MLB debut
- May 10, 2002, for the Houston Astros

Last MLB appearance
- July 28, 2014, for the San Diego Padres

MLB statistics
- Batting average: .241
- Home runs: 61
- Runs batted in: 189
- Win–loss record: 0–1
- Earned run average: 0.87
- Strikeouts: 6
- Stats at Baseball Reference

Teams
- As player: Houston Astros (2002–2007); San Diego Padres (2007, 2014); As coach: Milwaukee Brewers (2016–present)

Career highlights and awards
- World Series champion (2026)

Jason Dean Lane (born December 22, 1976) is an American professional baseball former player who currently serves as the offense and strategy coordinator for the Milwaukee Brewers of Major League Baseball (MLB). He played in MLB for the Houston Astros and San Diego Padres. Originally starting his career as an outfielder, Lane switched positions and became a pitcher.

== Playing career ==
=== Amateur career ===
Lane graduated from El Molino High School in Forestville, California in 1995. He attended Santa Rosa Junior College, where he was selected as the 1997 California Junior College Northern California Player of the Year and Bay Valley Conference MVP before transferring to University of Southern California. In 1998, he played collegiate summer baseball with the Hyannis Mets of the Cape Cod Baseball League.

At Southern California, Lane earned All-America honors during his senior season (1999), including pitching 2 2/3 innings in the 1998 College World Series championship game to pick up the win and help USC to its 12th NCAA baseball championship, topping Arizona State University 21–14. Lane served as the designated hitter (DH) in the game, going 3-for-6 with a ninth inning grand slam, setting a CWS record with 11 hits overall, and led the tournament with a .417 batting average. Morgan Ensberg was also his college teammate on the USC national championship squad.

=== Professional career ===
==== Houston Astros ====
The Houston Astros selected Lane in the sixth round of the 1999 Major League Baseball draft. The Astros believed Lane's future was at the plate rather than on the mound, so he began his professional career as a first baseman. He was later moved to the outfield because of Jeff Bagwell, who played first base. He made his major league debut in 2002.

In 2005, while hitting 26 home runs, Lane led the major leagues in fly ball percentage (51.3%). When asked after Game 4 of the 2005 National League Division Series (an 18-inning game) who would pitch if Roger Clemens had begun to tire (as he threw three innings of relief three days after pitching in Game 2), Astros manager Phil Garner stated that he would have had Lane pitch for the victory, with Clemens taking his place in the outfield. Lane hit the last home run and made the last out at Busch Memorial Stadium on October 19, 2005 as the Astros clinched their first league pennant.

On July 12, 2006, Lane was optioned to Triple-A Round Rock after Houston acquired utility slugger Aubrey Huff. In August, Lane was called back to the majors, and on August 29, 2006, he hit a pinch-hit grand slam off Milwaukee Brewers relief pitcher Dan Kolb in the eighth inning. This was the first grand slam of Lane's career, and the ninth pinch hit grand slam in club history. Lane concluded the 2006 season with 15 home runs, although he hit just .201 over 112 games.

Lane began the 2007 season with the Astros, but carried an abysmal .165 batting average into June. With Rookie of the Year candidate Hunter Pence's spectacular play earning him the starting job in center field, Lane became expendable and was demoted to Round Rock. On July 23, with Pence out with a fractured wrist and Lance Berkman struggling with a hand injury, Lane was called back up to the big league club. Lane batted .308 with eight home runs and 35 RBI in Round Rock in 42 games. While Pence was on the injured list, Lane received the bulk of the playing time at center field.

On August 22, 2007, Lane was demoted once more to Triple-A. The Astros recalled relief pitcher Travis Driskill to the majors to help their bullpen. Lane was recalled when rosters expanded in September.

==== San Diego Padres ====
On September 24, 2007, he was traded to the San Diego Padres for cash consideration. Lane was not offered a new contract by the Padres and became a free agent on December 12, 2007.

==== New York Yankees ====
On January 10, 2008, Lane agreed to a minor league contract with the New York Yankees and was invited to spring training. However, he did not make the team, and was assigned to the Yankees' Triple-A affiliate in Scranton/Wilkes-Barre.

==== Boston Red Sox ====
On August 19, 2008, after opting out of his contract with the Yankees, Lane signed a minor league contract with the Boston Red Sox. He became a free agent at the end of the season.

==== Toronto Blue Jays ====
Lane signed a minor league contract with the Toronto Blue Jays in December and was invited to spring training. Lane had a chance to take the DH role, but instead it went to Adam Lind. He was then sent to triple-A Las Vegas.

==== Florida Marlins ====
Lane signed a minor league deal with the Florida Marlins in 2010. He played in 47 games and hit .229 with three home runs.

==== Southern Maryland Blue Crabs ====
Lane signed a contract with the Southern Maryland Blue Crabs of the independent Atlantic League of Professional Baseball. His first appearance for the Blue Crabs was pinch hitting on June 28, 2010. Lane drew a walk in his only plate appearance.

==== Arizona Diamondbacks ====
On December 9, 2011, Lane signed a minor league contract with the Arizona Diamondbacks, now playing as a pitcher. He was invited to spring training, and in his first professional outing, allowed three hits and an unearned run in one inning.

==== Sugar Land Skeeters ====
In June 2012, Lane signed a contract with the Sugar Land Skeeters of the Atlantic League in their inaugural season. In July 2012, Lane was awarded Pitcher of The Month of the Atlantic League. At the end of the Sugar Land Skeeters 2012 season, Lane was named as the Skeeters' first-ever MVP. In his first year as a full-time pitcher since college, Lane was the ace of the pitching staff and an anchor in the middle of the batting order. Lane returned to the Skeeters for the 2013 season.

==== San Diego Padres (second stint) ====
Lane signed a minor league contract with the San Diego Padres on July 23, 2013. He was called up to the major leagues on June 3, 2014, entering the game against the Pittsburgh Pirates in the 4th inning. Lane retired all 10 hitters he faced. He appeared again in relief on June 6, 2014, pitching the 8th inning against the Washington Nationals. He allowed 1 hit and struck out 1. He was designated for assignment the next day. He was called back up to start on July 28, 2014, against the Atlanta Braves. Lane became the oldest starting pitcher to make his debut for the Padres, breaking the mark set by Walter Silva, who was 32 in his first start for San Diego. Lane pitched well, allowing just one earned run in six innings in a losing effort. He was designated for assignment for the second time the next day. Lane started the 2015 baseball season with the El Paso Chihuahuas on April 9, 2015.

== Coaching career ==
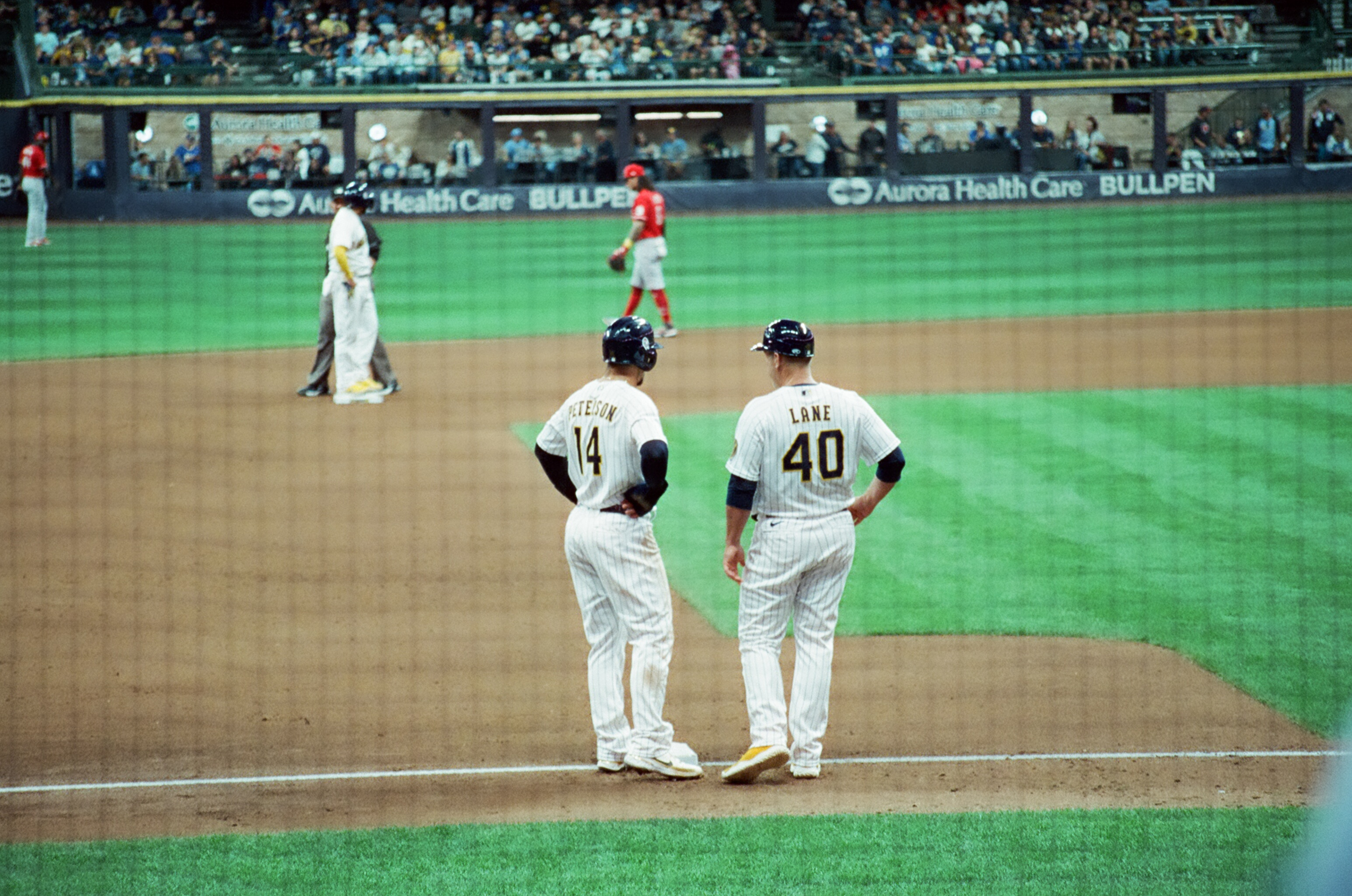
Lane coaching third for the Brewers in September 2022

On December 7, 2015, Lane was hired as an assistant hitting coach by the Milwaukee Brewers. Lane became the Brewers' first base coach prior to the 2020 season. He is later assumed the role of third base coach.

On January 5, 2026, Lane was promoted to the role of "offense and strategy coordinator."

Preceded by John Shelby	Milwaukee Brewers assistant hitting coach 2016-2019	Succeeded by Jacob Cruz
Preceded by Carlos Subero	Milwaukee Brewers first base coach 2020	Succeeded by Quintin Berry
Preceded by Ed Sedar	Milwaukee Brewers third base coach 2021-2025	Succeeded by Matt Erickson
