= List of St. Louis Cardinals first-round draft picks =

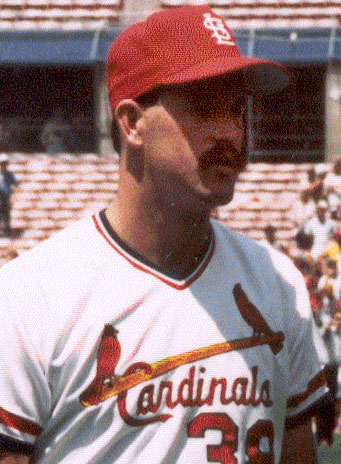
Todd Worrell (1982) is the only Cardinals first-round draft pick to win the Rookie of the Year Award.

The St. Louis Cardinals are a Major League Baseball (MLB) franchise based in St. Louis, Missouri. They play in the National League Central division. Since the institution of MLB's Rule 4 Draft, the Cardinals have selected 77 players in the first round. Officially known as the "First-Year Player Draft", the Rule 4 Draft is MLB's primary mechanism for assigning amateur baseball players from high schools, colleges, and other amateur baseball clubs to its teams. The draft order is determined based on the previous season's standings, with the team possessing the worst record receiving the first pick. In addition, teams which lost free agents in the previous off-season may be awarded compensatory or supplementary picks.

Of the 77 players picked in the first round by St. Louis, 39 have been pitchers, the most of any position; 30 of them were right-handed, while nine were left-handed. Eight outfielders, ten third basemen, six shortstops, six first basemen, five catchers, and two second basemen were taken as well. The team also drafted one player, Leron Lee (1966), who played as an infielder. 16 of the players came from high schools or universities in the state of California, and Texas and Arizona follow with seven and six players. The Cardinals have not drafted any players from their home state of Missouri.

Three of the Cardinals' draft picks have won World Series rings with the team. Braden Looper (1996) and Chris Duncan (1999) were both members of the major league roster when the Cardinals won the 2006 World Series. Lance Lynn was with the 2011 World Series winners. None of the Cardinals' first-round picks have won the Cy Young Award. Todd Worrell (1982) is the only first-round pick of the Cardinals to earn the MLB Rookie of the Year award with the team, winning it in 1986, with 2026 rookie 2nd baseman JJ Wetherholt on track to be the 2nd. The Cardinals have never held the first overall pick in the draft, and have only held a top five pick three times. The highest pick the Cardinals have held was the third overall pick, which they used on Looper in 1996.

The Cardinals have made 18 selections in the supplemental round of the draft and 27 compensatory picks since the institution of the First-Year Player Draft in 1965. These additional picks are provided when a team loses a particularly valuable free agent in the previous off-season,^{[V]} or, more recently, if a team fails to sign a draft pick from the previous year. As the Cardinals have signed all of their first-round picks, they have never been awarded a supplementary pick under this provision.

== Key ==
Year	Each year links to an article about that year's Major League Baseball draft.
Position	Indicates the secondary/collegiate position at which the player was drafted, rather than the professional position the player may have gone on to play
Pick	Indicates the number of the pick
†	Member of the National Baseball Hall of Fame
*	Player did not sign with the Cardinals
§	Indicates a supplemental pick
'06	Player was a member of the Cardinals' 2006 championship team
'11	Player was a member of the Cardinals' 2011 championship team

== Picks ==
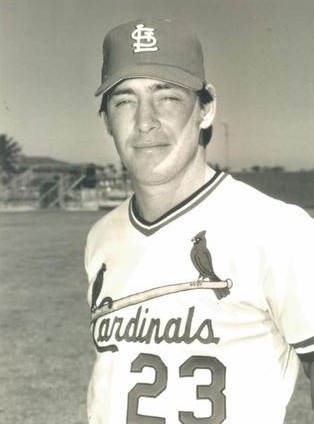
Ted Simmons (1967) made six all-star appearances with the Cardinals.

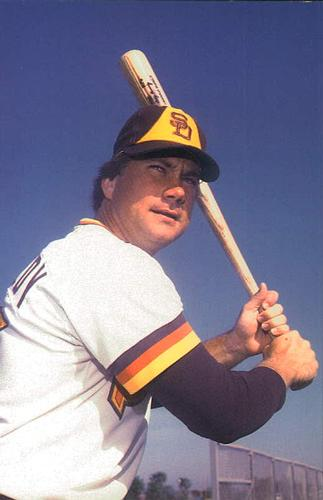
Terry Kennedy (1977) was the first college position player drafted by the Cardinals in the first round.

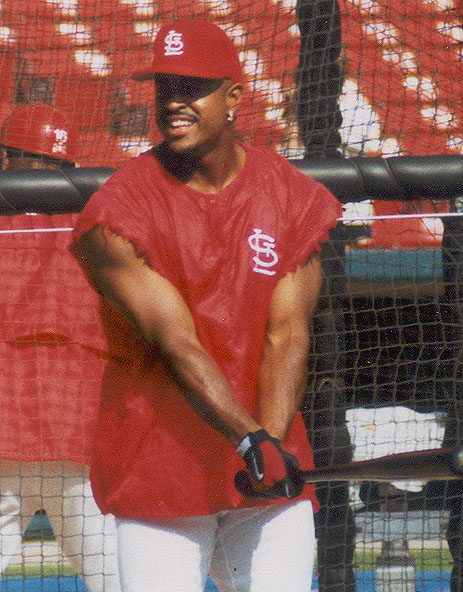
Brian Jordan (1988) was the Cardinals' first supplemental draft pick.

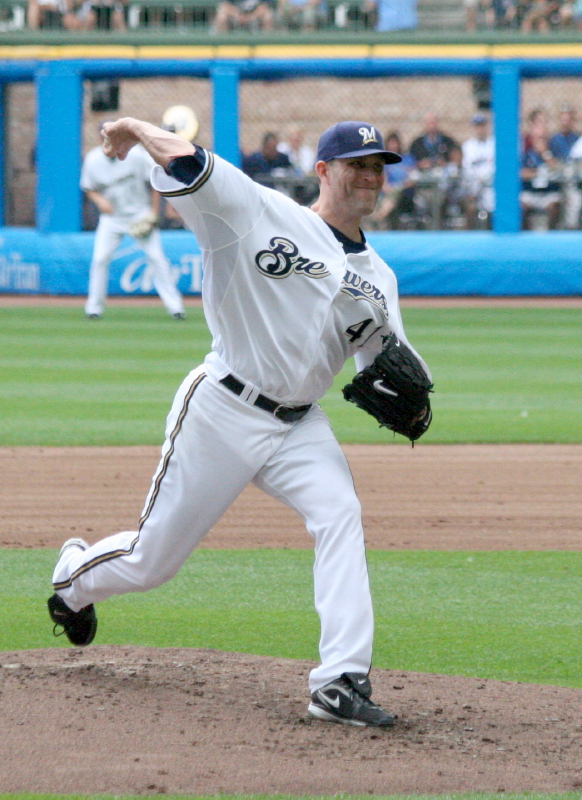
Braden Looper (1996) was drafted third by the Cardinals, their highest draft selection in team history.

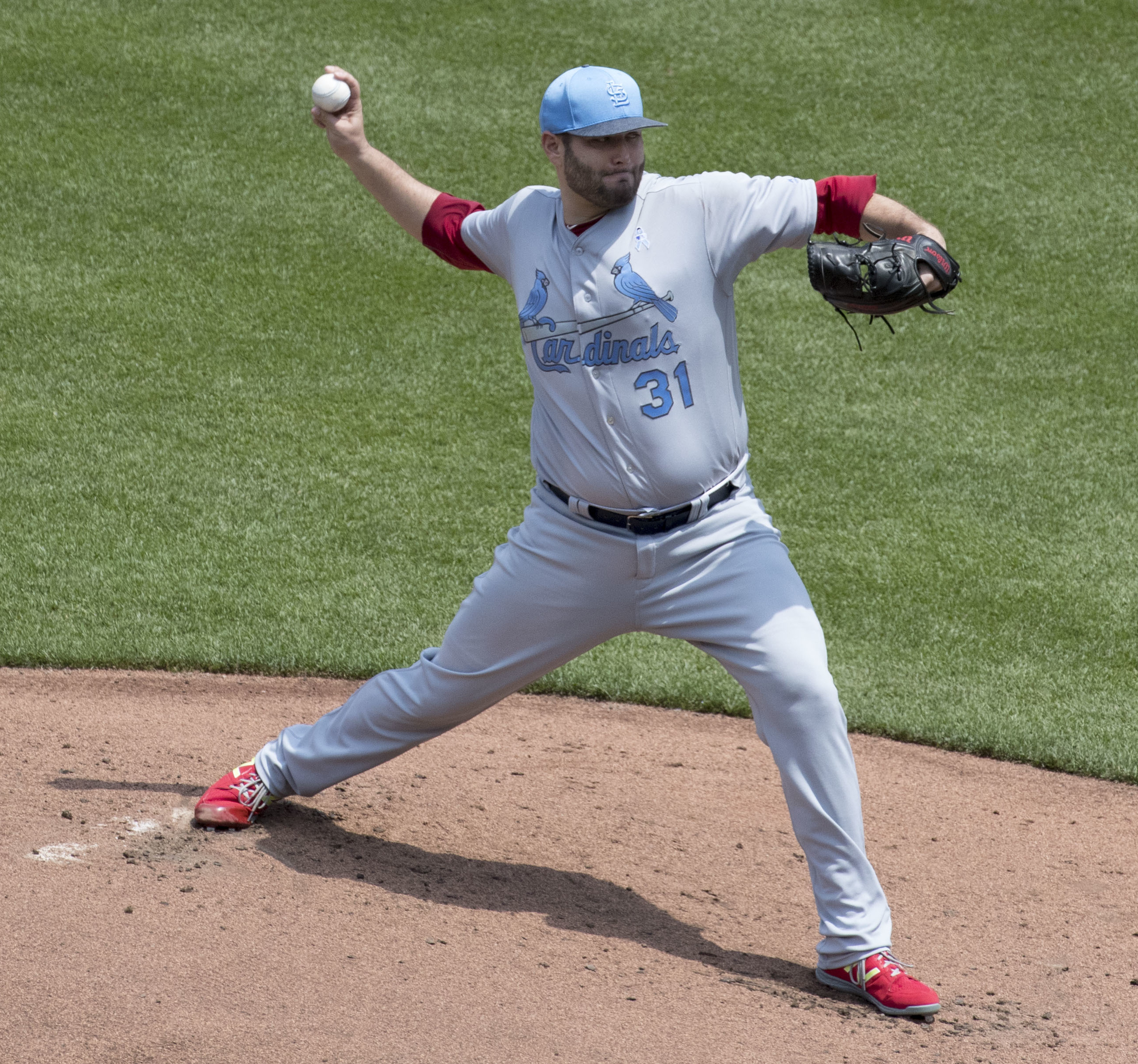
Lance Lynn (2008) is the Cardinals' most recent first-round draft pick to win a World Series.

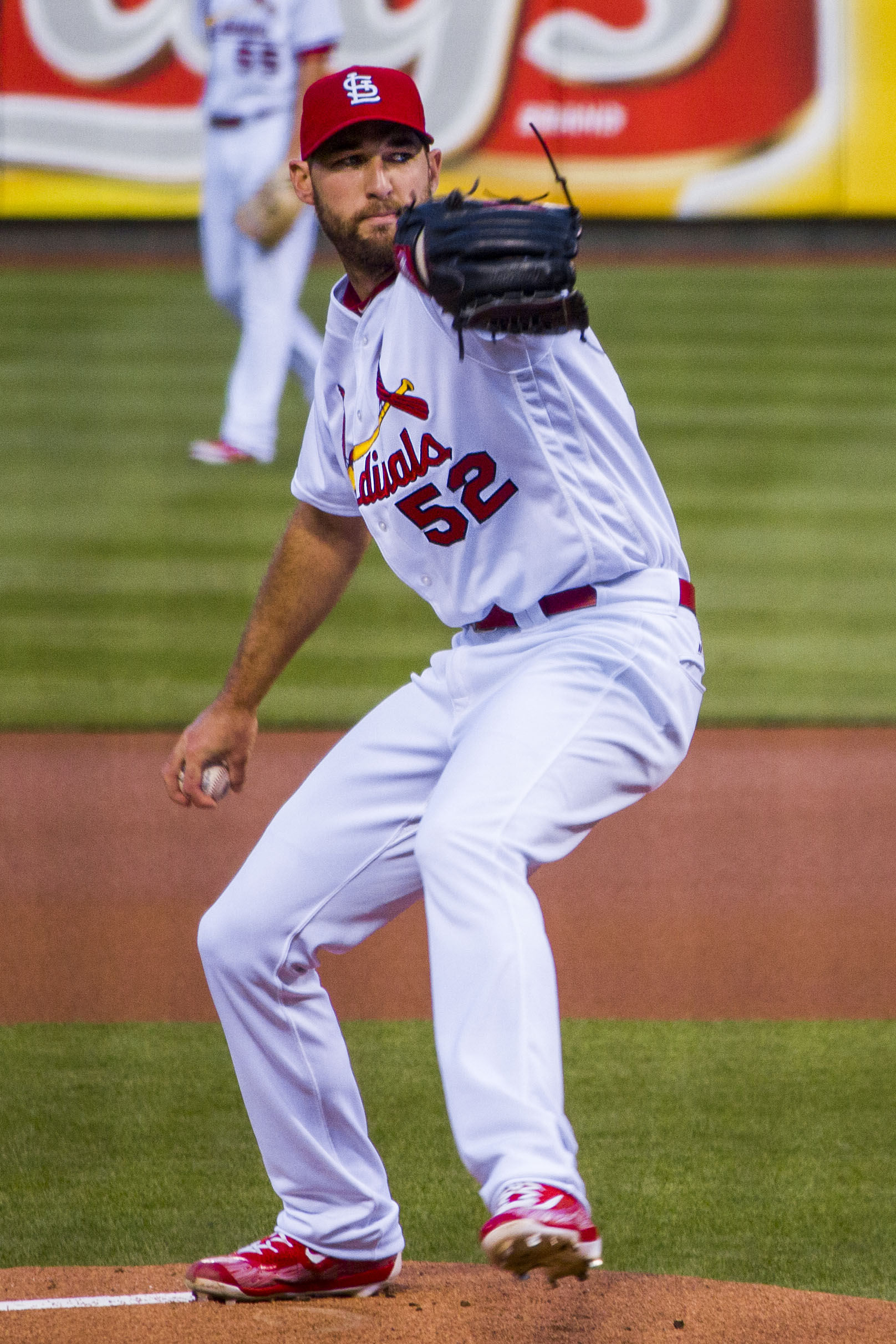
Michael Wacha (2012) is the Cardinals' most recent first-round draft pick to be selected to an All-Star Team.

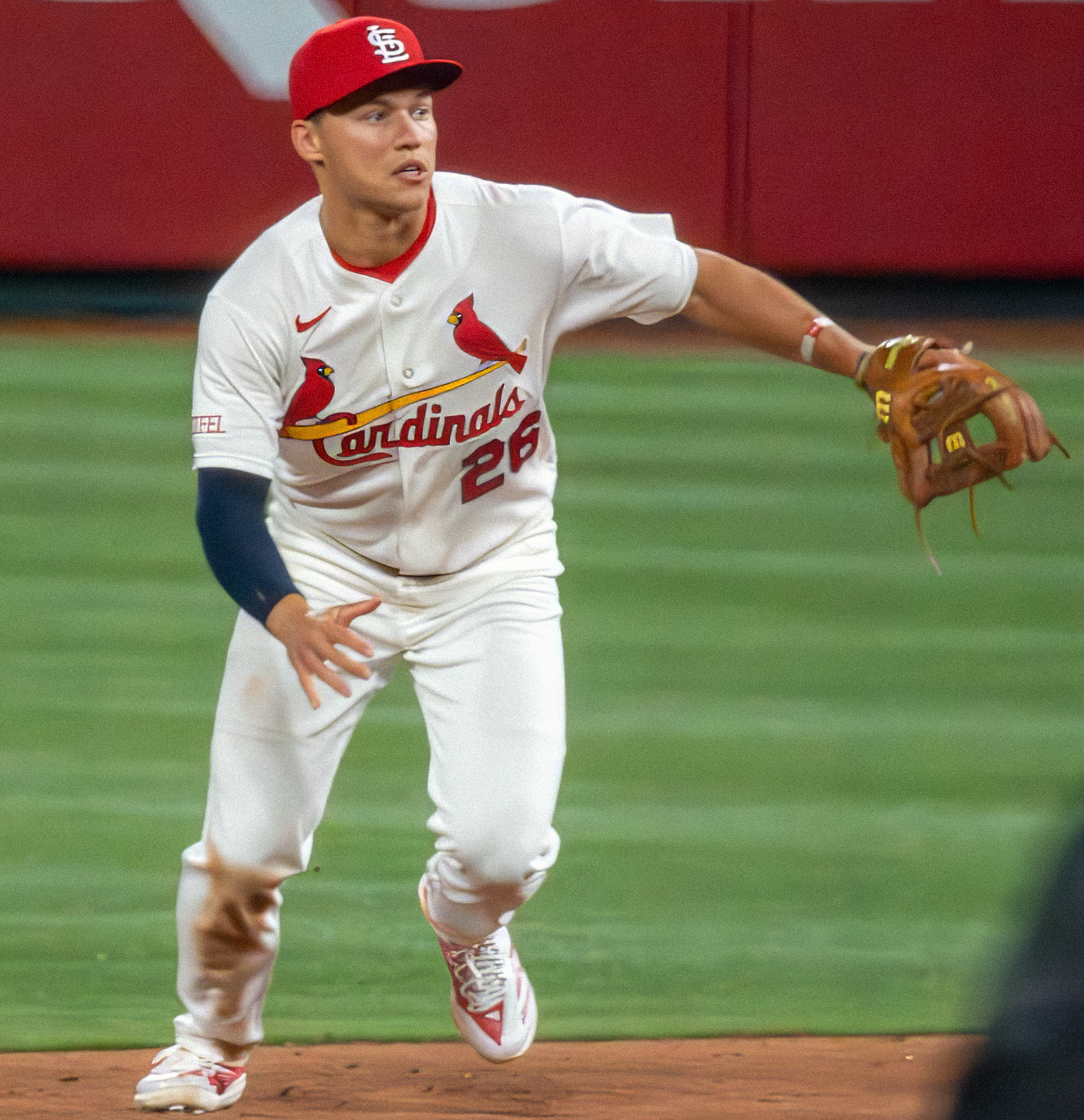
JJ Wetherholt (2024) is the Cardinals' most recent first-round draft pick to make his MLB debut.

Year	Name	Position	School (location)	Pick	Ref
1965	Joe DiFabio	Right-handed pitcher	Delta State University (Cleveland, Mississippi)	20	
1966	Leron Lee	Infielder	Grant High School (Sacramento, California)	7	
1967	Ted Simmons^{†}	Catcher	Southfield High School (Southfield, Michigan)	10	
1968	James Hairston	Outfielder	Roth High School (Dayton, Ohio)	19	
1969	Charles Minott	Left-handed pitcher	Royal Oak High School (Covina, California)	20	
1970	Jim Browning	Right-handed pitcher	Emma Sansom High School (Gadsden, Alabama)	11	
1971	Ed Kurpiel	First baseman	Archbishop Molloy High School (Hollis, New York)	8	
1972	Dan Larson	Right-handed pitcher	Alhambra High School (Alhambra, California)	21	
1973	Joe Edelen	Third baseman	Gracemont High School (Gracemont, Oklahoma)	12	
1974	Garry Templeton	Shortstop	Santa Ana Valley High School (Santa Ana, California)	13	
1975	David Johnson	Left-handed pitcher	Gaylord High School (Gaylord, Michigan)	16	
1976	Leon Durham	First baseman	Woodward High School (Cincinnati, Ohio)	15	
1977	Terry Kennedy	Catcher	Florida State University (Tallahassee, Florida)	6	
1978	Bob Hicks	First baseman	Gonzalez Tate High School (Pensacola, Florida)	15	
1979	Andy Van Slyke	Outfielder	New Hartford High School (New Hartford, New York)	6	
1980	Don Collins	Right-handed pitcher	Homer L. Ferguson High School (Newport News, Virginia)	15	
1981	Bob Meacham	Shortstop	San Diego State University (San Diego, California)	8	
1982	Todd Worrell	Right-handed pitcher	Biola University (La Mirada, California)	21	
1983	Jim Lindeman	Third baseman	Bradley University (Peoria, Illinois)	24	
1984	Mike Dunne	Right-handed pitcher	Bradley University (Peoria, Illinois)	7	
1985	Joe Magrane	Left-handed pitcher	University of Arizona (Tucson, Arizona)	18	
1986	Luis Alicea	Second baseman	Florida State University (Tallahassee, Florida)	23	
1987	Cris Carpenter	Right-handed pitcher	University of Georgia (Athens, Georgia)	14	
1988	John Ericks	Right-handed pitcher	University of Illinois at Urbana–Champaign (Urbana, Illinois)	22^{[a]}	
1988	Brad DuVall	Right-handed pitcher	Virginia Polytechnic Institute and State University (Blacksburg, Virginia)	23	
1988	Brian Jordan	Outfielder	University of Richmond (Richmond, Virginia)	30§^{[b]}	
1989	Paul Coleman	Outfielder	Frankston High School (Frankston, Texas)	6	
1990	Donovan Osborne	Left-handed pitcher	University of Nevada, Las Vegas (Paradise, Nevada)	13	
1990	Aaron Holbert	Shortstop	David Starr Jordan High School (Long Beach, California)	18^{[c]}	
1990	Paul Ellis	Catcher	University of California, Los Angeles (Los Angeles, California)	30§^{[d]}	
1991	Dmitri Young	Third baseman	Rio Mesa High School (Camarillo, California)	4	
1991	Allen Watson	Left-handed pitcher	New York Institute of Technology (Brooklyn, New York)	21^{[e]}	
1991	Brian Barber	Right-handed pitcher	Dr. Phillips High School (Orlando, Florida)	22^{[f]}	
1991	Tom McKinnon	Right-handed pitcher	David Starr Jordan High School (Long Beach, California)	28§^{[g]}	
1991	Dan Cholowsky	Third baseman	University of California, Berkeley (Berkeley, California)	39§^{[h]}	
1992	Sean Lowe	Right-handed pitcher	Arizona State University (Tempe, Arizona)	15	
1993	Alan Benes	Right-handed pitcher	Creighton University (Omaha, Nebraska)	16	
1994	Bret Wagner	Left-handed pitcher	Wake Forest University (Winston-Salem, North Carolina)	19	
1995	Matt Morris	Right-handed pitcher	Seton Hall University (South Orange, New Jersey)	12	
1995	Chris Haas	Third baseman	St. Mary High School (Paducah, Kentucky)	29§^{[i]}	
1996	Braden Looper '06	Right-handed pitcher	Wichita State University (Wichita, Kansas)	3	
1997	Adam Kennedy	Shortstop	California State University, Northridge (Northridge, California)	20	
1998	J. D. Drew	Outfielder	Florida State University (Tallahassee, Florida)	5	
1998	Ben Diggins	First baseman	Bradshaw High School (Dewey, Arizona)	32§^{[j]}	
1999	Chance Caple	Right-handed pitcher	Texas A&M University (College Station, Texas)	30^{[k]}	
1999	Nick Stocks	Right-handed pitcher	Florida State University (Tallahassee, Florida)	36§^{[l]}	
1999	Chris Duncan '06	First baseman	Canyon del Oro High School (Tucson, Arizona)	46§^{[m]}	
2000	Shaun Boyd	Outfielder	Vista High School (Vista, California)	13	
2000	Blake Williams	Right-handed pitcher	Southwest Texas State University (San Marcos, Texas)	24^{[n]}	
2001	Justin Pope	Right-handed pitcher	University of Central Florida (Orlando, Florida)	28	
2002	no first-round pick^{[o]}				
2003	Daric Barton	Catcher	Marina High School (Huntington Beach, California)	28	
2004	Chris Lambert	Right-handed pitcher	Boston College (Chestnut Hill, Massachusetts)	19	
2005	Colby Rasmus	Outfielder	Russell County High School (Seale, Alabama)	28^{[p]}	
2005	Tyler Greene	Shortstop	Georgia Institute of Technology (Atlanta, Georgia)	30	
2005	Mark McCormick	Right-handed pitcher	Baylor University (Waco, Texas)	43§^{[q]}	
2005	Tyler Herron	Right-handed pitcher	Wellington Community High School (Wellington, Florida)	46§^{[r]}	
2006	Adam Ottavino	Right-handed pitcher	Northeastern University (Boston, Massachusetts)	30	
2006	Chris Perez	Right-handed pitcher	University of Miami (Coral Gables, Florida)	42§^{[s]}	
2007	Pete Kozma	Shortstop	Owasso High School (Owasso, Oklahoma)	18	
2007	Clay Mortensen	Right-handed pitcher	Gonzaga University (Spokane, Washington)	36§^{[t]}	
2008	Brett Wallace	First baseman	Arizona State University (Tempe, Arizona)	13	
2008	Lance Lynn '11	Right-handed pitcher	University of Mississippi (Oxford, Mississippi)	39§^{[u]}	
2009	Shelby Miller	Right-handed pitcher	Brownwood High School (Brownwood, Texas)	19	
2010	Zack Cox	Third baseman	University of Arkansas (Fayetteville, Arkansas)	25	
2010	Seth Blair	Right-handed pitcher	Arizona State University (Tempe, Arizona)	46§^{[v]}	
2010	Tyrell Jenkins	Right-handed pitcher	Henderson High School (Henderson, Texas)	50§^{[w]}	
2011	Kolten Wong	Second baseman	University of Hawaiʻi at Mānoa (Honolulu, Hawaii)	22	
2012	Michael Wacha	Right-Handed pitcher	Texas A&M University (College Station, Texas)	19^{[x]}	
2012	James Ramsey	Outfielder	Florida State University (Tallahassee, Florida)	23	
2012	Stephen Piscotty	Third baseman	Stanford University (Palo Alto, California)	36§^{[y]}	
2012	Patrick Wisdom	Third baseman	Saint Mary's College of California (Moraga, California)	52§^{[z]}	
2012	Steve Bean	Catcher	Rockwall High School (Rockwall, Texas)	59§^{[aa]}	
2013	Marco Gonzales	Left-Handed pitcher	Gonzaga University (Spokane, Washington)	19	
2013	Rob Kaminsky	Left-Handed pitcher	St. Joseph Regional High School (Montvale, New Jersey)	28^{[ab]}	
2014	Luke Weaver	Right-handed pitcher	Florida State University (Tallahassee, Florida)	27	
2014	Jack Flaherty	Right-Handed pitcher	Harvard-Westlake School (Los Angeles, California)	34§^{[ac]}	
2015	Nick Plummer	Outfielder	Brother Rice High School (Bloomfield Township, Michigan)	23	
2015	Jake Woodford	Right-Handed pitcher	H.B. Plant High School (Tampa, Florida)	39§^{[]}	
2016	Delvin Pérez	Shortstop	International Baseball Academy (Ceiba, Puerto Rico)	23	
2016	Dylan Carlson	Outfielder	Elk Grove High School (Elk Grove, California)	33§^{[ad]}	
2016	Dakota Hudson	Right-handed pitcher	Mississippi State University (Mississippi State, Mississippi)	34§^{[ae]}	
2017	no first-round pick				
2018	Nolan Gorman	Third baseman	Sandra Day O'Connor High School (Phoenix, Arizona)	19	
2019	Zack Thompson	Left-handed pitcher	University of Kentucky (Lexington, Kentucky)	19	
2020	Jordan Walker	Third baseman	Decatur High School (Decatur, Georgia)	21	
2021	Michael McGreevy	Right-handed pitcher	UC Santa Barbara (Isla Vista, California)	18	
2022	Cooper Hjerpe	Left-handed pitcher	Oregon State University (Corvallis, Oregon)	22	
2023	Chase Davis	Outfielder	University of Arizona (Tucson, Arizona)	21	
2024	JJ Wetherholt	Shortstop	West Virginia University (Morgantown, West Virginia)	7	
2025	Liam Doyle	Left-handed pitcher	University of Tennessee (Knoxville, Tennessee)	5	
2026	Trevor Condon	Outfielder	Etowah High School (Etowah, Georgia)	13	
2026	Tegan Kuhns	Right-handed pitcher	University of Tennessee (Knoxville, Tennessee)	32§	

== See also ==
- St. Louis Cardinals minor league players

== Footnotes ==
- ^{V} Through the 2012 draft, free agents were evaluated by the Elias Sports Bureau and rated "Type A", "Type B", or not compensation-eligible. If a team offered arbitration to a player but that player refused and subsequently signed with another team, the original team was able to receive additional draft picks. If a "Type A" free agent left in this way, his previous team received a supplemental pick and a compensatory pick from the team with which he signed. If a "Type B" free agent left in this way, his previous team received only a supplemental pick. Since the 2013 draft, free agents are no longer classified by type; instead, compensatory picks are only awarded if the team offered its free agent a contract worth at least the average of the 125 current richest MLB contracts. However, if the free agent's last team acquired the player in a trade during the last year of his contract, it is ineligible to receive compensatory picks for that player.
- ^{a} The Cardinals gained a compensatory first-round pick in 1988 from the New York Yankees for losing free agent Jack Clark.
- ^{b} The Cardinals gained a supplemental first-round pick in 1988 for losing free agent Jack Clark.
- ^{c} The Cardinals gained a compensatory first-round pick in 1990 from the Boston Red Sox for losing free agent Tony Peña.
- ^{d} The Cardinals gained a supplemental first-round pick in 1990 for losing free agent Tony Peña.
- ^{e} The Cardinals gained a compensatory first-round pick in 1991 from the Toronto Blue Jays for losing free agent Ken Dayley.
- ^{f} The Cardinals gained a compensatory first-round pick in 1991 from the New York Mets for losing free agent Vince Coleman.
- ^{g} The Cardinals gained a supplemental first-round pick in 1991 for losing free agent Vince Coleman.
- ^{h} The Cardinals gained a supplemental first-round pick in 1991 for losing free agent Ken Dayley.
- ^{i} The Cardinals gained a supplemental first-round pick in 1995 for losing free agent Gregg Jefferies.
- ^{j} The Cardinals gained a supplemental first-round pick in 1998 for losing free agent Dennis Eckersley.
- ^{k} The Cardinals gained a compensatory first-round pick in 1999 from the Atlanta Braves for losing free agent Brian Jordan.
- ^{l} The Cardinals gained a supplemental first-round pick in 1999 for losing free agent Brian Jordan.
- ^{m} The Cardinals gained a supplemental first-round pick in 1999 for losing free agent Delino DeShields.
- ^{n} The Cardinals gained a compensatory first-round pick in 2000 from the Texas Rangers for losing free agent Darren Oliver.
- ^{o} The Cardinals lost their first-round pick in 2002 to the Oakland Athletics as compensation for signing free agent Jason Isringhausen.
- ^{p} The Cardinals gained a compensatory first-round pick in 2005 from the Boston Red Sox for losing free agent Édgar Rentería.
- ^{q} The Cardinals gained a supplemental first-round pick in 2005 for losing free agent Édgar Rentería.
- ^{r} The Cardinals gained a supplemental first-round pick in 2005 for losing free agent Mike Matheny.
- ^{s} The Cardinals gained a supplemental first-round pick in 2006 for losing free agent Matt Morris.
- ^{t} The Cardinals gained a supplemental first-round pick in 2007 for losing free agent Jeff Suppan.
- ^{u} The Cardinals gained a supplemental first-round pick in 2008 for losing free agent Troy Percival.
- ^{v} The Cardinals gained a supplemental first-round pick in 2010 for losing free agent Mark DeRosa.
- ^{w} The Cardinals gained a supplemental first-round pick in 2010 for losing free agent Joel Piñeiro.
- ^{x} The Cardinals gained a compensatory first-round pick in 2012 from the Los Angeles Angels of Anaheim for losing free agent Albert Pujols.
- ^{y} The Cardinals gained a supplemental first-round pick in 2012 for losing free agent Albert Pujols.
- ^{z} The Cardinals gained a supplemental first-round pick in 2012 for losing free agent Darren Oliver.
- ^{aa} The Cardinals gained a supplemental first-round pick in 2012 for losing free agent Edwin Jackson.
- ^{ab} The Cardinals gained a compensatory first-round pick in 2013 from the Milwaukee Brewers for losing free agent Kyle Lohse.
- ^{ac} The Cardinals gained a compensatory first-round pick in 2014 from the New York Yankees for losing free agent Carlos Beltrán.
- ^{ad} The Cardinals gained a compensatory first-round pick in 2016 from the Chicago Cubs for losing free agent John Lackey.
- ^{ae} The Cardinals gained a compensatory first-round pick in 2016 from the Chicago Cubs for losing free agent Jason Heyward.
