= Dave Berg =

David Berg or Dave Berg may refer to:

- Dave Berg (infielder) (born 1970), retired Major League Baseball infielder
- Dave Berg (cartoonist) (1920–2002), American cartoonist
- Dave Berg (songwriter), American country music songwriter
- David Berg (1919–1994), founder of the Children of God (now Family International) cult
- David Berg (pitcher) (born 1993), retired baseball pitcher
- Dave Berg (producer), American producer of The Tonight Show with Jay Leno
