= Pac-12 Conference Baseball Pitcher of the Year =

- Awarded for: the most outstanding baseball pitcher in the Pac-12 Conference
- Country: United States
- First award: 1991
- Currently held by: Bryson Van Sickle, Utah

The Pac-12 Conference pitcher of the Year is a baseball award given to the Pac-12 Conference's most outstanding pitcher. From 1991 to 1998, an award was given to the most outstanding pitcher in the South division. After the 1999 season, the divisions were eliminated, making all Pac-12 pitchers eligible.

== Key ==
| † | Co-pitchers of the Year |
| * | Awarded a national pitcher of the Year award: the Dick Howser Trophy or the Golden Spikes Award |
| pitcher (X) | Denotes the number of times the pitcher had been awarded the pitcher of the Year award at that point |

Also known to be the first indian born professional baseball player, drafted by the Philadelphia Phillies in 1994 and the Texas Rangers in 1995

== Winners ==
=== 1999–present ===
| Season | Pitcher | School | Reference |
|---|---|---|---|
| 1999 | Barry Zito | Southern California | |
| 2000^{†} | Rick Currier | Southern California | |
| 2000^{†} | Justin Wayne | Stanford | |
| 2001 | Mark Prior* | Southern California | |
| 2002 | Jeremy Guthrie | Stanford | |
| 2003 | John Hudgins | Stanford | |
| 2004 | Tim Lincecum | Washington | |
| 2005 | Ian Kennedy | Southern California | |
| 2006 | Tim Lincecum* (2) | Washington | |
| 2007 | Preston Guilmet | Arizona | |
| 2008 | Mike Leake | Arizona State | |
| 2009 | Mike Leake (2) | Arizona State | |
| 2010 | Seth Blair | Arizona State | |
| 2011 | Trevor Bauer* | UCLA | |
| 2012 | Alex Keudell | Oregon | |
| 2013 | David Berg | UCLA | |
| 2014 | Jace Fry | Oregon State | |
| 2015 | David Berg (2) | UCLA | |
| 2016 | Troy Rallings | Washington | |
| 2017 | Luke Heimlich | Oregon State | |
| 2018 | Luke Heimlich (2) | Oregon State | |
| 2019 | Ryan Garcia | UCLA | |
| 2021 | Brendan Beck | Stanford | |
| 2022 | Alex Williams | Stanford | |
| 2023 | Quinn Mathews | Stanford | |
| 2024 | Bryson Van Sickle | Utah | |

=== South Division (1991–1998) ===
| Season | Pitcher | School | Reference |
|---|---|---|---|
| 1991 | Jackie Nickell | Southern California | |
| 1992 | Pete Janicki | UCLA | |
| 1993^{†} | Marc Barcelo | Arizona State | |
| 1993^{†} | Bobby Kahlon | California | |
| 1994^{†} | Noah Peery | Arizona State | |
| 1994^{†} | Dan Reed | Stanford | |
| 1995^{†} | Randy Flores | Southern California | |
| 1995^{†} | Kyle Peterson | Stanford | |
| 1996 | Seth Etherton | Southern California | |
| 1997 | Kyle Peterson (2) | Stanford | |
| 1998^{†} | Jeff Austin | Stanford | |
| 1998^{†} | Seth Etherton (2) | Southern California | |

== Winners by school ==
| School (year joined)^{a} | Winners | Years |
|---|---|---|
| Stanford (1959) | 10 | 1994^{†}, 1995^{†}, 1997, 1998^{†}, 2000^{†}, 2002, 2003, 2021, 2022, 2023 |
| Southern California (1959) | 8 | 1991, 1995^{†}, 1996, 1998^{†}, 1999, 2000^{†}, 2001, 2005 |
| Arizona State (1978) | 5 | 1993^{†}, 1994^{†}, 2008, 2009, 2010 |
| UCLA (1959) | 4 | 1992, 2011, 2013, 2015 |
| Washington (1959) | 3 | 2004, 2006, 2016 |
| Oregon State (1964) | 2 | 2014, 2017, 2018 |
| Arizona (1978) | 1 | 2007 |
| California (1959) | 1 | 1993^{†} |
| Oregon^{b} (1964) | 1 | 2012 |
| Utah (2011) | 1 | 2024 |
| Washington State (1962) | 0 | — |

== Footnotes ==
- ^{a} For purposes of this table, the "year joined" reflects the year that each team joined the conference now known as the Pac-12 as currently chartered. Although the Pac-12 claims the Pacific Coast Conference (PCC), founded in 1915, as part of its own history, that conference disbanded in 1959 due to infighting and scandal. That same year, five PCC members established the Athletic Association of Western Universities (AAWU) under a new charter that functions to this day. The pitcher of the Year Award was not established until 1978, by which time all of the final members of the PCC except for Idaho were reunited in what was then the Pac-8.
- ^{b} Oregon discontinued its baseball program after the 1981 season, re-instating it before the 2009 season.
