= Luke Heimlich =

American baseball player (born 1996)

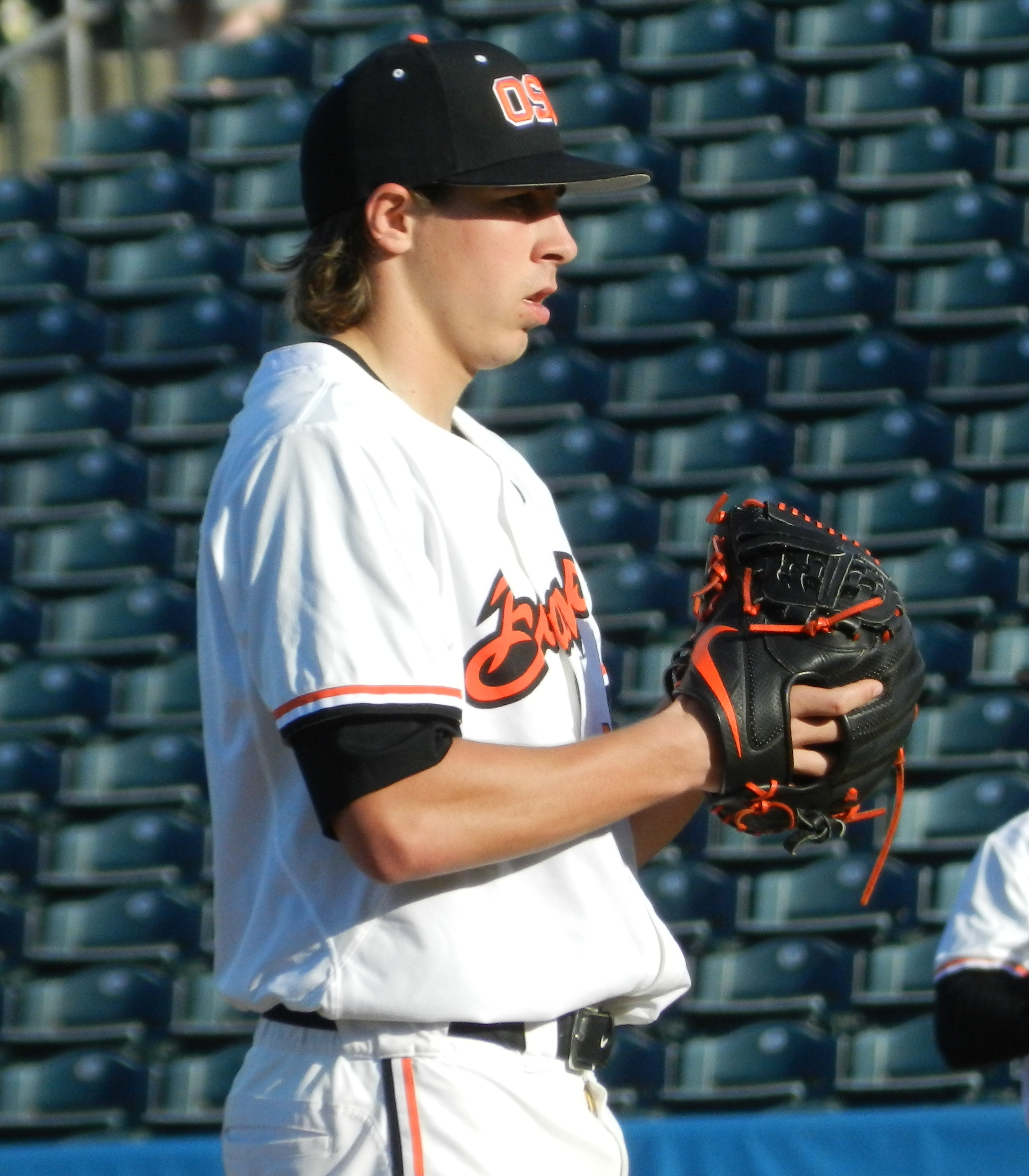
- Heimlich with Oregon State in 2015
- Pitcher
- Born: February 3, 1996 (age 30); Puyallup, Washington, U.S.
- Bats: Left Throws: Left
- Stats at Baseball Reference

Career highlights and awards
- National Pitcher of the Year Award (2018)

Luke Andrew Heimlich (born February 3, 1996) is an American former professional baseball pitcher. He attended Oregon State University and played college baseball for the Oregon State Beavers. He was named the Collegiate Pitcher of the Year in 2018.

== Career ==
Heimlich attended Puyallup High School in Puyallup, Washington, and played for the school's baseball team as a pitcher and as a first baseman. In 2014, his senior year, Heimlich had an 11–0 win–loss record with a 0.66 earned run average (ERA). He won the Gatorade Player of the Year for the state of Washington.

Heimlich enrolled at Oregon State University to play college baseball for the Oregon State Beavers as a pitcher. In 2017, he was named to the Golden Spikes Award watch list. In 2017, his junior year, he led the nation with a 0.81 ERA and was named the Pac-12 Conference's Pitcher of the Year. After revelations of his sex assault on a child became public in 2017, he left the team for the remainder of the season, missing the 2017 College World Series. He went unselected in the 2017 MLB draft. He returned to the Beavers in 2018. Though he had pitched to a 15–1 win–loss record with a 2.42 ERA prior to the 2018 MLB draft, and was again named the Pac-12 Conference's Pitcher of the Year, Heimlich was not selected. After the draft, Heimlich won the National Pitcher of the Year Award. His school record for strikeouts in a season (159) lasted until Cooper Hjerpe broke it in 2022.

On August 7, 2018, the Lamigo Monkeys of the Chinese Professional Baseball League (CPBL) announced the signing of Heimlich to a professional contract. The CPBL did not allow the contract to take effect due to his criminal record.

=== Tecolotes de los Dos Laredos ===
On March 8, 2019, Heimlich reached an agreement with the Tecolotes de los Dos Laredos of the Mexican League. The league's president indicated that the agreement may not be approved. However, the team was given authorization to go forward with the signing on April 6, 2019, and Heimlich was assigned to the team. He made his professional debut with Dos Laredos on April 9. Heimlich pitched to an 8–7 record and 4.58 ERA in 21 appearances for the Tecolotes in 2019. Heimlich did not play in a game in 2020 due to the cancellation of the Mexican League season because of the COVID-19 pandemic. He later became a free agent and retired from professional baseball prior to the 2021 season.

== Personal life ==
Heimlich is the second youngest of eight children born to Meridee and Mark Heimlich. His mother is a social worker and his father works in construction.

When he was 15 years old, Heimlich was accused of sexually molesting his six-year-old niece on two occasions, once when she was four years old and once when she was six years old. On August 27, 2012, he pleaded guilty to a single count of child molestation in the first degree. This adjudication came to the public's attention in 2017 due to a clerical error in which the Oregon State Police believed that he had failed to update his registration as a sex offender. After the conviction was made public in 2017, Heimlich wrote, "I have taken responsibility for my conduct when I was a teenager." However, in 2018, Heimlich denied the allegations, saying that he pleaded guilty to "quickly dispense with the case and for the sake of family relations." The record was sealed in 2017.
