= Dave Berg (producer) =

American television producer

- Education: Northwestern University
- Occupations: Television producer & writer

Dave Berg is an American television producer and writer. He is most known for co-producingThe Tonight Show with Jay Leno for 18 years. Berg also produced The Jay Leno Show, where he appeared in numerous comedy sketches, as well as The O'Reilly Factor. He worked as a writer for NBC News and CNBC. He was a consultant to the late Frank Pastore and was a regular guest on Pastore's radio show.

Berg has a bachelor's degree in political science from Northwestern University and a master's degree in journalism from Kansas State University. He has written for USA Today, The Huffington Post, Reader's Digest, National Review, Christianity Today, The Washington Times, The Daily Caller and Crisis Magazine.

In 2014, he wrote the book Behind the Curtain: An Insider's View of Jay Leno's Tonight Show.
