= Randy Flores =

American baseball player (born 1975)

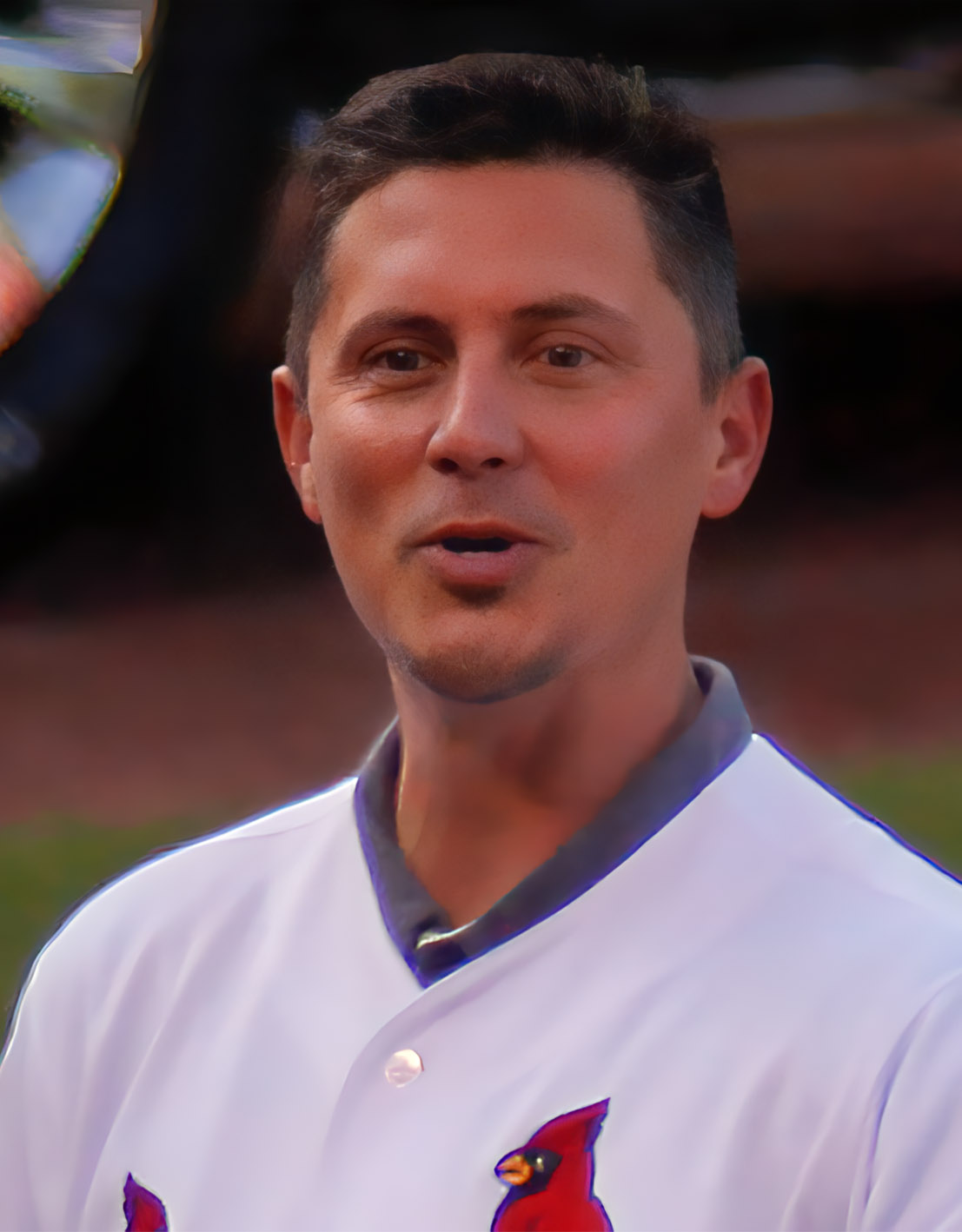
- Flores with the St. Louis Cardinals

Houston Astros
- Pitcher / General manager
- Born: July 31, 1975 (age 51); Bellflower, California, U.S.
- Batted: Left Threw: Left

MLB debut
- April 23, 2002, for the Texas Rangers

Last MLB appearance
- September 27, 2010, for the Minnesota Twins

MLB statistics
- Win–loss record: 11–5
- Earned run average: 4.61
- Strikeouts: 202
- Stats at Baseball Reference

Teams
- As player: Texas Rangers (2002); Colorado Rockies (2002); St. Louis Cardinals (2004–2008); Colorado Rockies (2009–2010); Minnesota Twins (2010); As general manager: Houston Astros (2027–present)

Career highlights and awards
- World Series champion (2006)

Randy Alan Flores (born July 31, 1975) is an American professional baseball executive and former pitcher who is the general manager of the Houston Astros of Major League Baseball (MLB). He played in MLB for the Texas Rangers, Colorado Rockies, St. Louis Cardinals, and Minnesota Twins.

Flores attended the University of Southern California (USC) and played college baseball for the USC Trojans. He was the 1995 Co-Pac-10 Pitcher of the Year. The New York Yankees selected him in the ninth round of the 1997 MLB draft. He made his MLB debut on April 23, 2002, as a member of the Texas Rangers. He was a member of the St. Louis Cardinals' 2006 World Series championship team. He also played for the Colorado Rockies and Minnesota Twins.

Following his playing career, Flores became an on-air analyst for ESPN and the Pac-12 Network. He also coached for USC and started his own company, OnDeckDigital, whose product allows players and scouts to evaluate game play. He became the director of scouting and assistant general manager for the Cardinals before becoming the general manager of the Astros.

== Early life and amateur career ==
After Flores attended El Rancho High School in Pico Rivera, California. He was quarterback and kicker for the football team. In addition, Flores played varsity baseball. Flores played college baseball for the Trojans at the University of Southern California (USC) as a recruited walk-on. He graduated in 1997 with a Bachelor of Science in business administration with a concentration in finance.

While playing college baseball at USC from 1994 to 1997, he set several pitching records that still stood as of 2013, including career wins with 42, innings pitched with 484 1/3 and complete games with 22. Flores was the 1995 Co-Pac-10 Pitcher of the Year, going 13–3 with a 3.24 earned run average (ERA) and 86 strikeouts. After the 1995 season, he played collegiate summer baseball with the Chatham A's of the Cape Cod Baseball League.

== Professional playing career ==
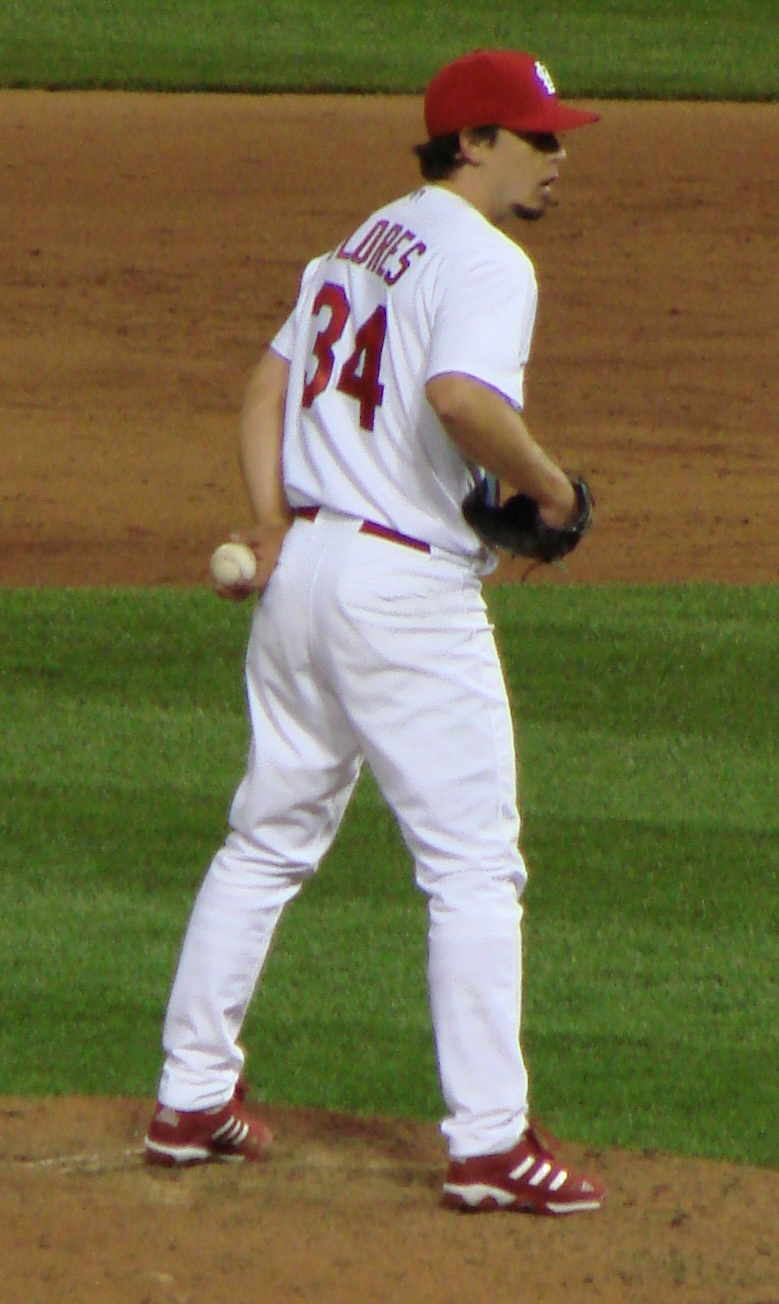
Flores with the Cardinals.

The New York Yankees selected Flores in the ninth round of the 1997 Major League Baseball draft. In 2001, the Yankees sent him to the Texas Rangers to complete a trade earlier in the year for infielder Randy Velarde. Flores made his major league debut with the Rangers on April 23, 2002. He also played for the Colorado Rockies before signing as a free agent with the Cardinals on November 20, 2003.

Flores won a championship ring when the Cardinals won the 2006 World Series, defeating the Detroit Tigers four games to one. He appeared in seven games in that postseason, registering 5 2/3 innings without giving up an earned run. The next season, he appeared in a career-high 70 games, posting 55 innings pitched and a 4.25 ERA. From 2005 through 2007, he appeared in 185 games, contributing a pivotal role in the Cardinals' bullpen. However, injuries in the second half of 2007 began to reduce his effectiveness, and in the summer of 2008, he cleared waivers prior to a demotion to the Memphis Redbirds. Flores became a free agent after the 2008 season.

On February 10, 2009, Flores signed a minor league contract with the Colorado Rockies with an invitation to spring training. He spent most of the season with the Colorado Springs Sky Sox before the Rockies called him up in September when the rosters expanded. He made the Opening Day roster in 2010 and appeared in 47 games, completing 27 1/3 innings with 18 SO and a 2.96 ERA, a record of 2–0, and a 1.28 WHIP. Left-handed batters collected 11 hits in 50 at bats against him. The Rockies designated him for assignment on August 19, 2009. The Minnesota Twins claimed him off waivers six days later.

On February 10, 2011, he signed a minor league contract with the San Diego Padres with an invite to spring training. Working 18 2/3 innings for Tucson, he struck out 19 and walked six before opting out of his contract on May 15. Two days later, he signed a minor league contract with the Yankees. He was released by the Yankees on August 2, 2011, and immediately signed a minor league contract with the Milwaukee Brewers. He was released by the Milwaukee Brewers on Tuesday, August 30, 2011, after asking for his release.

== Post-playing career ==
In 2012, Flores joined ESPN as an on-air analyst during the NCAA Division I Baseball Championship. In 2013, Flores returned to USC as a baseball broadcaster and later assistant baseball coach, while also pursuing a master's degree. In 2014, Flores earned a Master of Science degree in post-secondary administration with an emphasis on athletic administration. In February 2015, Flores joined the Pac-12 Network as a baseball analyst. He launched his own startup company, OnDeckDigital, which utilizes video capture technology to allow players and scouts to evaluate their game play. Scouting departments of MLB clubs started using his product.

On August 28, 2015, the Cardinals hired Flores as their new director of scouting, replacing Chris Correa. The Cardinals promoted him to assistant general manager after the 2018 season. After being credited with the MLB draft selections of Alec Burleson and Jordan Walker, the Cardinals signed Flores to a contract extension in 2022.

On October 30, 2026, the Houston Astros hired Flores as their general manager.

== Personal life ==
Flores' brother, Ron, was also a left-handed relief pitcher who appeared in the major leagues, playing for the Oakland Athletics from 2005–07. Flores and his wife, Lindsey, have two daughters and one son.
