= Seth Blair =

American baseball player (born 1989)

- Pitcher
- Born: March 3, 1989 (age 36); Rock Falls, Illinois, U.S.
- Bats: Right Throws: Right
- Stats at Baseball Reference

Seth A. Blair (born March 3, 1989) is an American former professional baseball pitcher. Prior to playing professionally, he played college baseball for the Arizona State Sun Devils. Standing at 6 feet 2 inches (1.88 m) and 185 pounds (84 kg), he throws and hits right-handed.

== Amateur career ==
Blair attended Rock Falls High School, where he starred for the school's baseball team. He was also invited to compete in tournaments, including the 2005 Junior Olympics. He was selected by the Oakland Athletics of Major League Baseball (MLB) in the 47th round of the 2007 MLB draft, but opted to attend college rather than sign with the Athletics. He then enrolled at Arizona State University, where he played college baseball for the Arizona State Sun Devils in the Pacific-10 Conference. He formed a strong starting rotation along with Mike Leake and Josh Spence. In 2008 and 2009, he played collegiate summer baseball with the Cotuit Kettleers of the Cape Cod Baseball League and was named a league all-star in 2008. In 2010, he was named the Pacific-10 Pitcher of the Year, and an All-American according to the American Baseball Coaches Association and Baseball America. At the time of the 2010 MLB draft, he had a 12–0 win–loss record, a 3.06 earned run average (ERA), 98 strikeouts and 22 walks in 97 innings pitched for the Sun Devils that season. He finished his Arizona State career with a 23–5 record.

== Professional career ==
=== St. Louis Cardinals ===
The St. Louis Cardinals selected Blair in the first round, with the 46th overall selection, of the draft. Blair signed with the Cardinals on July 30, 2010. In 2011, he had a 6–3 win–loss record with a 5.29 ERA for the Quad Cities River Bandits of the Single–A Midwest League. The team dismissed Blair during their postseason for violating team rules.

Out of spring training in 2012, the Cardinals assigned Blair to the Palm Beach Cardinals of the High–A Florida State League. In April 2012, following pain experienced while throwing, Blair was diagnosed with an enchondroma, a benign tumor in a joint of his middle finger on his pitching hand. He returned to Palm Beach late in the season, recording a 5.40 ERA in 19 2/3 innings. After the 2012 season, the Cardinals assigned him to the Surprise Saguaros of the Arizona Fall League, where he had a 2–1 record, a 2.25 ERA, 22 strikeouts, and 14 walks in 20 innings pitched. Blair pitched for the Springfield Cardinals of the Double-A Texas League in 2013, where he had a 5.07 ERA in 22 starts, but finished strong in his final seven starts. He was assigned to Springfield to start the 2014 season. Blair was released by the Cardinals on April 30, 2015, and left baseball.

=== San Diego Padres ===
Blair returned to baseball in 2019, signing a minor league contract with the San Diego Padres on May 24, 2019. He played for the Lake Elsinore Storm of the High–A California League, compiling a 4.11 ERA with 47 strikeouts across 17 games. Blair was released by the Padres organization on August 9.

=== Boston Red Sox ===
During the COVID-19 pandemic, he opened up his backyard training site for other pitchers. On August 7, 2020, Blair signed a minor league contract with the Boston Red Sox and was added to their 60-man player pool.

On December 22, 2020, Blair was re-signed by the Red Sox to a minor-league deal for the 2021 season, and was selected as a non-roster invitee to major league spring training in 2021. Blair began the 2021 season in Triple-A with the Worcester Red Sox, and was reassigned to the Double-A Portland Sea Dogs in late May. Overall during 2021, he appeared in 32 games (one start) compiling a 3.10 ERA, 3–2 record, and two saves while striking out 51 batters in 40 2/3 innings. Blair elected free agency following the season on November 7, 2021.

=== Tampa Bay Rays ===
On March 11, 2022, Blair signed a minor league contract with the Tampa Bay Rays. Blair made 21 appearances for the Triple-A Durham Bulls, battling to an 0-3 record and a 7.61 ERA with 17 strikeouts in 23 2/3 innings pitched. On July 8, he was released by the Rays organization.

=== Toros de Tijuana ===
On July 31, 2023, Blair signed with the Toros de Tijuana of the Mexican League. In 4 games for Tijuana, he recorded a 2.70 ERA with 2 strikeouts across 3 1/3 innings of work.

== Personal life ==
Blair's father, Al, played college baseball for Southern Illinois University and Illinois State University. His brother, Shane, played baseball as a catcher on the Rock Falls high school team.
