= David Berg (pitcher) =

American baseball player

- Pitcher
- Born: March 28, 1993 (age 32); Glendora, California, U.S.
- Bats: Right Throws: Right
- Stats at Baseball Reference

David Andrew Berg (born March 28, 1993) is an American former professional baseball pitcher. He attended the University of California, Los Angeles (UCLA), where he played college baseball for the UCLA Bruins baseball team. He was named an All-American and Pac-12 Conference Baseball Pitcher of the Year in 2013. He set a National Collegiate Athletic Association (NCAA) record for saves in a single season with 24. The Texas Rangers selected Berg in the 17th round of the 2014 Major League Baseball draft. He did not sign with the Rangers and returned to UCLA for his senior season. He was then drafted by the Chicago Cubs in the sixth round of the 2015 MLB draft. He left professional baseball in 2018 without ever playing in the major leagues.

== Early life ==
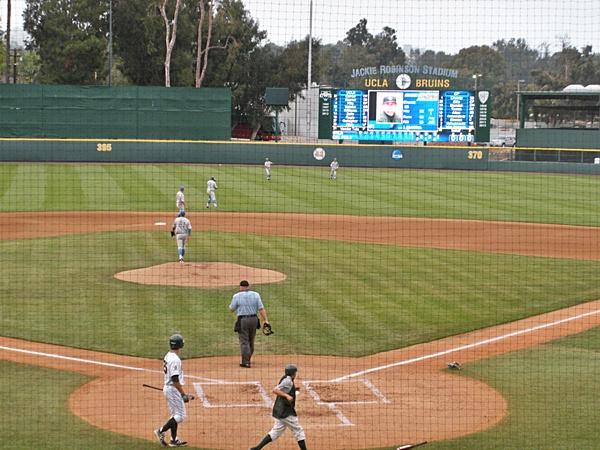
David Berg was the closer for the UCLA Bruins playing at the Los Angeles Regional at Jackie Robinson Stadium on June 1, 2013

Berg attended Bishop Amat Memorial High School in La Puente, California, where he played for the school's baseball team as a pitcher. He struggled while attempting to work as a starting pitcher, and in his junior year, his coaches helped him achieve success as a middle relief pitcher when he learned to use the sidearm delivery. He led his school's baseball team to the sectional championship.

== College career ==
Berg was only recruited by the University of California, Irvine and the University of California, Los Angeles (UCLA). Berg enrolled at UCLA, and walked on to the UCLA Bruins baseball team. In 2012, his freshman season, Berg set Bruins and Pac-12 Conference records for appearances while working in middle relief. As a sophomore, Berg became the closer for the 2013 UCLA Bruins, and pitched to a 7–0 win–loss record, 21 saves, and a 0.88 earned run average (ERA) during the regular season. His 21 saves set a Bruins record and his ERA tied for the best in college baseball. He was named the Pac-12 Conference Baseball Pitcher of the Year and a finalist for the National Pitcher of the Year Award in 2013. He won the NCBWA Stopper of the Year Award. was named to the United States national collegiate baseball team in 2012 and 2013.

With the Bruins, Berg competed in the 2013 NCAA Division I baseball tournament, leading the team to the College World Series national championship against the Mississippi State Bulldogs. The Bruins had a tournament record of 8–0 heading into the Finals. At the Championship Series, Berg set a new NCAA single-season record with his 24th save on June 24, 2013, and he also made his 51st appearance of the season, becoming the first pitcher in NCAA history to record 50 or more appearances in two seasons. The Bruins defeated the Bulldogs for the national title and Berg was named to the tournament's All-West Region team.

Berg missed time in his junior year due to a biceps strain. He finished the season with a 1.50 ERA and 11 saves. The Texas Rangers selected Berg in the 17th round, with the 516th overall selection, of the 2014 MLB draft. He did not sign with the Rangers and returned to UCLA for his senior season.

On May 15, 2015, James Kaprielian combined with Berg for the first no-hitter in UCLA history. Kaprielian pitched the first nine innings and Berg pitched the tenth inning to complete the no-hitter. He finished the year with a 0.68 ERA and 13 saves in 43 appearances, and won his second Stopper of the Year Award.

== Professional career ==
The Chicago Cubs selected Berg in the sixth round, with the 173rd overall selection, of the 2015 MLB draft. Berg signed and spent 2015 with both the Eugene Emeralds and the Myrtle Beach Pelicans, where he posted a 2–1 record with a 1.40 ERA. In 2016, Berg started the season with Myrtle Beach and was later promoted to the Tennessee Smokies; in 43 total games between both clubs, 4–4 record and a 5.17 ERA. He spent 2017 with Tennessee, Myrtle Beach, and the Iowa Cubs, pitching to a combined 4–4 record and 5.16 ERA with a 1.38 WHIP in a career high 61 innings pitched between the three teams.

On March 27, 2018, the Cubs released Berg.

== Post-playing career ==
In 2019, Berg returned to UCLA as a graduate assistant coach. In 2020 and 2021, he served as the director of baseball operations. In 2022 and 2023, he served as a volunteer assistant coach. In August 2023, he was hired as a full-time assistant coach. In October 2023, however, he was disciplined after slapping a student-athlete during a dinner with coaches, players and recruits at an El Cholo Spanish Cafe in Santa Monica. He was suspended from his position and fined $10,000. He and the school parted ways following the 2024 season.

== Awards and honors ==
- June 5, 2015 – Berg was named the National Collegiate Baseball Writers Association (NCBWA) District IX Player of the Year.

== See also ==
- 2013 College Baseball All-America Team
