= Cooper Hjerpe =

American baseball player (born 2001)

St. Louis Cardinals – No. 56
- Pitcher
- Born: March 16, 2001 (age 25); Davis, California, U.S.
- Bats: Left Throws: Left

MLB debut
- September 6, 2026, for the St. Louis Cardinals

MLB statistics (through 2026 season)
- Win–loss record: 1–0
- Earned run average: 4.38
- Strikeouts: 15
- Stats at Baseball Reference

Teams
- St. Louis Cardinals (2026–present)

Cooper Austin Hjerpe (/ˈdʒərpiː/ JER-pee; born March 16, 2001) is an American professional baseball pitcher for the St. Louis Cardinals of Major League Baseball (MLB). He was selected 22nd overall by the Cardinals in the 2022 MLB draft, and made his MLB debut in 2026.

== Amateur career ==
Hjerpe attended Woodland High School in Woodland, California, a city northwest of Sacramento. He committed to play college baseball at Oregon State University as a sophomore. As a junior in 2018, he went 8–0 with a 0.78 ERA and 128 strikeouts over 53 2/3 innings alongside hitting eight home runs. In 2019, as a senior, he struck out 105 batters in 44 innings and threw four no-hitters. He went unselected in the 2019 Major League Baseball draft and enrolled at Oregon State to play collegiate baseball.

In 2020, Hjerpe's freshman year at Oregon State, he made six relief appearances and went 1–1 with a 5.25 ERA before the season was cancelled due to the COVID-19 pandemic. As a redshirt freshman in 2021, he was named the Pac-12 Pitcher of the Week as well as the National Player of the Week by Collegiate Baseball Newspaper on May 24 after he gave up one run and two hits while striking out 11 in a 3–1 win versus the seventh-ranked Arizona Wildcats. For the season, he pitched in 17 games (making 16 starts) and went 3–6 with a 4.21 ERA and 98 strikeouts over 77 innings.

Hjerpe entered the 2022 season as Oregon State's number one starter and garnered numerous preseason All-American honors. On March 22, he was named Pac-12 Pitcher of the Week for the second time in his career after pitching seven innings and giving up one hit while striking out 12 in a 21–0 win versus the Arizona State Sun Devils. On April 1, in a 1–0 loss versus the Stanford Cardinal, Hjerpe threw eight scoreless innings and struck out 17 batters, tied for the most in school history, and was once again named Pac-12 Pitcher of the Week and National Player of the Week by Collegiate Baseball Newspaper. At the end of the regular season, he was named to the Pac-12 First Team as well as being named an All-American. Hjerpe was scheduled to start the first game of Oregon State's Super Regional versus Auburn University, but was scratched due to an undisclosed illness. He pitched in Game 2 of the Super Regional and passed former Oregon State pitcher Luke Heimlich for the school record for most strikeouts in a season with 161. Hjerpe finished the 2022 season having started 17 games, going 11–2 with a 2.53 ERA, 161 strikeouts, and 23 walks over 103 1/3 innings. He was named the 2022 National Pitcher of the Year.

== Professional career ==
The St. Louis Cardinals selected Hjerpe in the first round with the 22nd overall selection of the 2022 Major League Baseball draft. He signed with the club for $3.12 million.

Hjerpe made his professional debut in 2023 with the High-A Peoria Chiefs. He missed time during the season due to an elbow injury that required surgery. Over ten games (eight starts), he went 2–3 with a 3.51 ERA and 51 strikeouts over 41 innings. After the regular season, he played in the Arizona Fall League with the Scottsdale Scorpions.

To begin the 2024 season, Hjerpe started all 11 games he appeared in for Peoria, posting a 0–3 record with a 3.35 ERA and 56 strikeouts over 37 2/3 innings. He was promoted to the Double-A Springfield Cardinals in June, starting in four games with a 2–1 record and 3.07 ERA before being shut down for the season in early July with an elbow injury.

On April 15, 2025, it was announced that Hjerpe would miss the entirety of the season after undergoing Tommy John surgery. On November 18, the Cardinals added Hjerpe to their 40-man roster to protect him from the Rule 5 draft.

Hjerpe was optioned to the Triple-A Memphis Redbirds to begin the 2026 season. He opened the season on the 60-day injured list while recovering from surgery. In June, he was activated from the injured list and assigned to the Rookie-level Florida Complex League Cardinals on a rehab assignment. His rehab was then transferred to the Single-A Palm Beach Cardinals. Following rehab, he was assigned to Springfield, before he was promoted to Memphis. Across 15 minor league starts in 2026, Hjerpe had a 0–1 record, a 3.00 ERA, and 61 strikeouts across 42 innings.

On September 6, 2026, the Cardinals promoted Hjerpe to the major leagues for the first time. He made his MLB debut the same day at Coors Field against the Colorado Rockies and struck out six batters across four innings in relief to earn the first win of his career. Hjerpe made a total of four relief appearances for the Cardinals and ended the season with a 1–0 record, a 4.38 ERA, and 15 strikeouts across 12 1/3 innings.

== Personal life ==
Hjerpe's father, Carl, played college baseball for the Cal Poly Mustangs in the 1980s.
