= Oregon State Beavers baseball =

Baseball team representing Oregon State University

Oregon State Beavers
- 2026 Oregon State Beavers baseball team
- Founded: 1893 (133 years ago)
- University: Oregon State University
- Athletic director: Kevin Griffin
- Head coach: Mitch Canham (7th season)
- Conference: Independent
- Location: Corvallis, Oregon
- Home stadium: Goss Stadium at Coleman Field (capacity: 3,587)
- Nickname: Beavers
- Colors: Orange and black

College World Series champions
- 2006, 2007, 2018

College World Series appearances
- 1952, 2005, 2006, 2007, 2013, 2017, 2018, 2025

NCAA regional champions
- 2005, 2006, 2007, 2011, 2013, 2017, 2018, 2022, 2024, 2025

NCAA tournament appearances
- 1952, 1962, 1963, 1983, 1985, 1986, 2005, 2006, 2007, 2009, 2010, 2011, 2012, 2013, 2014, 2015, 2017, 2018, 2019, 2021, 2022, 2023, 2024, 2025, 2026

Conference tournament champions
- 1985, 1986

Conference regular season champions
- 1908, 1910, 1913, 1915, 1916, 1925, 1927, 1938, 1940, 1943, 1951, 1952, 1958, 1962, 1963, 1975, 1982, 1983, 1985, 1986, 1994, 2005, 2006, 2013, 2014, 2017

The Oregon State Beavers baseball team represents Oregon State University in NCAA Division I college baseball. The team has participated as an independent since the Pac-12 Conference's dissolution in 2024. They are coached by Mitch Canham and assistants Ryan Gipson, Darwin Barney, and Rich Dorman. They play home games in Goss Stadium at Coleman Field. The Beavers won the 2006, 2007, and 2018 College World Series to become the winningest college baseball program in the Super Regionals era. In addition, the program has won 26 conference championships, qualified for 23 NCAA tournaments, and appeared in eight College World Series.

With the Pac-12 baseball league ceasing to exist after the 2023-24 season, the Beavers will become a baseball Independent beginning in 2025.

== Oregon State in the NCAA Tournament ==
Year	Region	Opponent	Result
1952	0–2	.000	College World Series 7th Place
1962	0–2	.000	District 8
1963	1–2	.333	District 8
1983	0–2	.000	West I Regional
1985	0–2	.000	West I Regional
1986	2–2	.500	Midwest Regional
2005	5–3	.625	College World Series 7th Place, Hosted Corvallis Super Regional
2006	11–2	.846	College World Series Champions, Hosted Corvallis Super Regional
2007	11–1	.917	College World Series Champions, Hosted Corvallis Super Regional
2009	2–2	.500	Fort Worth Regional
2010	1–2	.333	Gainesville Regional
2011	3–2	.600	Nashville Super Regional
2012	2–2	.500	Baton Rouge Regional
2013	7–3	.700	College World Series 3rd Place, Hosted Corvallis Super Regional
2014	3–2	.600	Corvallis Regional
2015	1–2	.333	Dallas Regional
2017	7–2	.778	College World Series 3rd Place, Hosted Corvallis Super Regional
2018	11–2	.846	College World Series Champions, Hosted Corvallis Super Regional
2019	0–2	.000	Corvallis Regional
2021	3–2	.600	Fort Worth Regional
2022	4–3	.571	Corvallis Super Regional
2023	2–2	.500	Baton Rouge Regional
2024	3–2	.600	Lexington Super Regional
2025	7–3	.700	College World Series 5th Place, Hosted Corvallis Super Regional
2026	2–2	.500	Eugene Regional
TOTALS	88–53	.624	

== Head coaches ==
Records taken from the 2021 Oregon State baseball media guide.

Season	Coach	Years	Record	Pct.
1907	F.C. McReynolds	1	5–2	.714
1908	Joe Fay	1	11–4	.733
1909	Otto Moore	1	5–4	.566
1910	Fielder Jones	1	13–4–1	.750
1911	Frederick Walker	1	8–7	.533
1912	E.J. Stewart	1	5–9	.357
1913	Jesse Garrett	1	7–10	.412
1914	Wilkie Clark	1	7–9	.438
1915	Roy Goble	1	13–8	.619
1916	Hans Loof	1	10–9–1	.525
1918	J.D. Baldwin	1	4–6	.400
1919–1921	Jimmie Richardson	3	30–26–1	.535
1922	Guy Rathbun	1	13–8	.619
1923–1928, 1930–1931, 1938–1966	Ralph Coleman	35	561–316–1	.640
1929	Roy Lamb	1	10–9	.526
1932–1937	Slats Gill	6	56–70	.444
1967–1972	Gene Tanselli	6	113–102–2	.525
1973–1994	Jack Riley	22	613–411–5	.596
1995–2018	Pat Casey	24	900–458–6	.662
2019	Pat Bailey	1	36–20–1	.640
2020–present	Mitch Canham	5	176–87	.669
Totals	21 coaches	115 seasons	2596–1579-17	.621

== Facilities ==
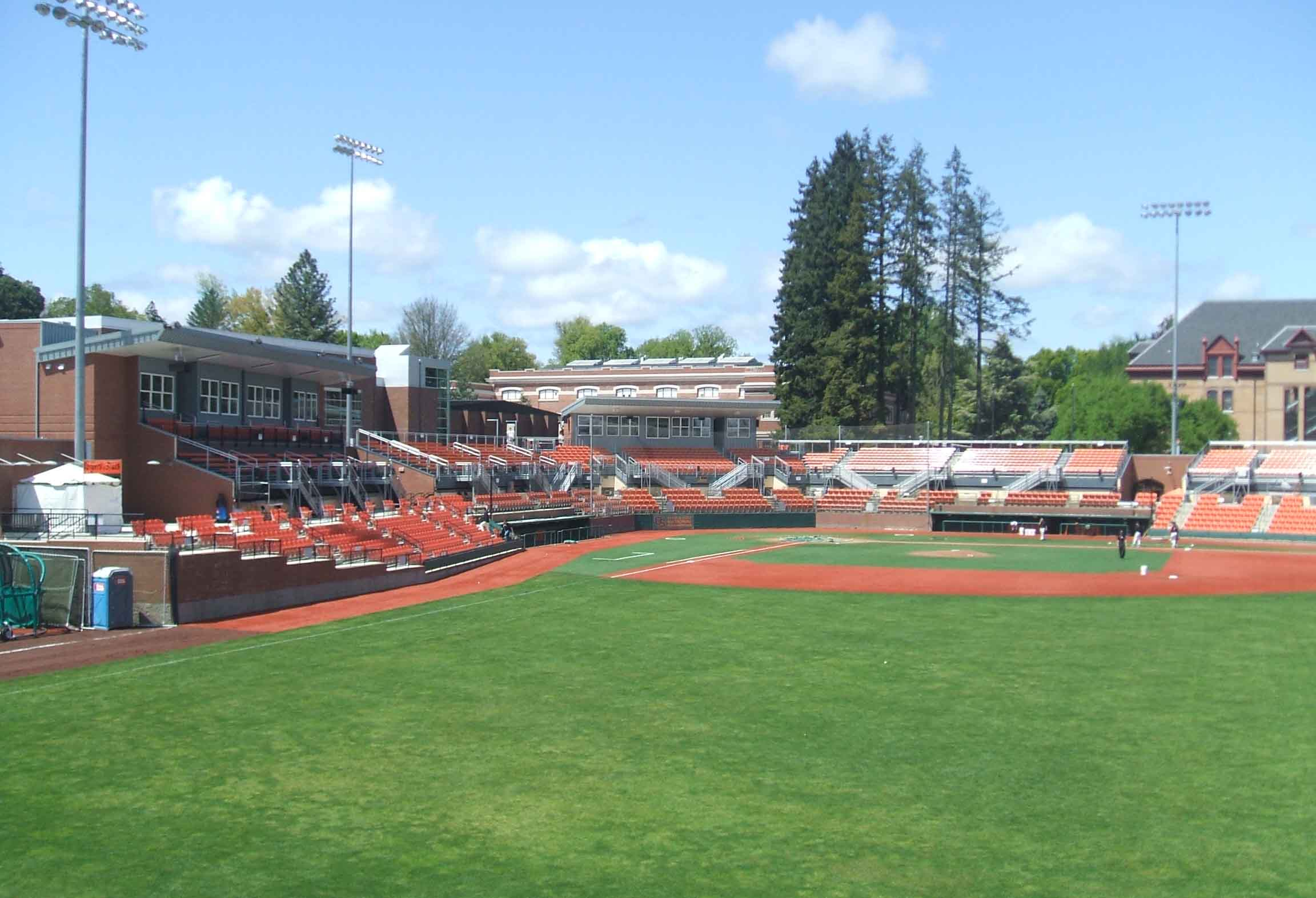
Goss Stadium is the Beavers Baseball home stadium.

Goss Stadium at Coleman Field is the home of Oregon State Baseball and considered the oldest continuous ballpark in the nation. Stadium lights were added in 2002. In 2006, the infield was changed to an artificial turf surface while the outfield remained grass. In 2015, the Jacoby Ellsbury Players' Locker Room (in name of Jacoby Ellsbury who donated $1 million to the project) was completed down the third base line, which finished a string of upgrades to Goss Stadium, including installation of artificial turf over the entire playing area.

== Player Awards ==
=== All-Americans ===
Oregon State players have been named All-Americans 45 times, as of the end of the 2024 season. The university recognizes All-Americans as selected by the American Baseball Coaches Association, Baseball America magazine, the Collegiate Baseball Newspaper, College Baseball Foundation, D1Baseball.com, the National Collegiate Baseball Writers Association, Perfect Game, and USA Today/Sports Weekly.

Key

ABCA	American Baseball Coaches Association
BA	Baseball America
CB	Collegiate Baseball
CBF	College Baseball Foundation
D1	D1Baseball.com
NCBWA	National Collegiate Baseball Writers Association
PG	Perfect Game
USAT/SW	USA Today/Sports Weekly

Year	Player	Position	Org
1952	Dwane Helbig	Outfielder	ABCA (2)
1953	Bailey Brem	Pitcher	ABCA (3)
1954	Jay Dean	First baseman	ABCA (1)
1955	Jay Dean	First baseman	ABCA (1)
1960	Larry Petersen	Outfielder	ABCA (1)
1962	Cecil Ira	Pitcher	ABCA (3)
1963	Cecil Ira	Pitcher	ABCA (3)
1982	Jim Wilson	First baseman	ABCA (3), BA (3)
1986	Dave Brundage	Utility	ABCA (2)
1987	Ken Bowen	Shortstop	BA (2)
1993	Scott Christman	Pitcher	ABCA (1), CB (1), BA (2)
1994	Mason Smith	Pitcher	BA (3), CB (3)
1997	Mark Newell	Pitcher	NCBWA (3)
1998	Andrew Checketts	Pitcher	NCWBA (2), CB (3)
2001	Scott Nicholson	Pitcher	CB (3)
2005	Dallas Buck	Pitcher	ABCA (1), BA (1), CB (1), USAT/SW (1), NCBWA (2)
2005	Jacoby Ellsbury	Outfielder	ABCA (1), BA (1), NCBWA (1), CB (2), USAT/SW (2)
2005	Jonah Nickerson	Pitcher	USAT/SW (2)
2006	Dallas Buck	Pitcher	ABCA (2), CB (2), NCBWA (2)
2006	Cole Gillespie	Outfielder	ABCA (1), BA (1), CB (1), NCBWA (3)
2006	Kevin Gunderson	Pitcher	NCBWA (2)
2006	Jonah Nickerson	Pitcher	BA (2)
2007	Mitch Canham	Catcher	CB (3)
2011	Sam Gaviglio	Pitcher	BA (2), CB (2), NCBWA (3)
2012	Michael Conforto	Outfielder	BA (2), NCBWA (2), ABCA (2)
2013	Michael Conforto	Outfielder	PG (1), ABCA (1)
2013	Andrew Moore	Pitcher	BA (1), ABCA (1), CB (2)
2013	Matt Boyd	Pitcher	BA (3), CB (3), PG (3)
2014	Michael Conforto	Outfielder	BA (1), NCBWA (1), CB (1), ABCA (1), PG (1)
2014	Jace Fry	Pitcher	ABCA (1), NCBWA (1), CB (1), BA (2), PG (2)
2014	Ben Wetzler	Pitcher	NCBWA (1), CB (1), BA (2), PG (2), ABCA (2)
2015	Jeff Hendrix	Outfielder	ABCA (3)
2015	Andrew Moore	Pitcher	CB (2), ABCA (2), D1 (3), BA (3)
2016	Bryce Fehmel	Pitcher	CB (2)
2017	Luke Heimlich	Pitcher	CB (1)
2017	Jake Thompson	Pitcher	BA (1), D1 (1), ABCA (1), PG (1), NCBWA (1), CB (1)
2017	Jake Mulholland	Pitcher	NCBWA (2)
2017	Nick Madrigal	Infielder	BA (1), D1 (1), ABCA (1), PG (2), NCBWA (3), CB (3)
2018	Trevor Larnach	Outfielder	BA (1), D1 (1), NCBWA (1), ABCA (1), PG (1), CB (2)
2018	Adley Rutschman	Catcher	D1 (1), ABCA (1), BA (2), PG (2), NCBWA (3), CB (3)
2018	Cadyn Grenier	Shortstop	BA (2), D1 (3)
2018	Nick Madrigal	Second Baseman	NCBWA (2), ABCA (2), BA (3), PG (3)
2018	Luke Heimlich	Pitcher	CB (1), NCBWA (1)
2018	Jake Muholland	Pitcher	NCBWA (3), CB (3)
2019	Adley Rutschman	Catcher	ABCA (1), BA (1), CB (1), CBF (1), D1 (1), NCBWA (1), PG (1)
2019	Jake Muholland	Pitcher	PG (3)
2019	Brandon Eisert	Pitcher	BA (3)
2020	Christian Chamberlain	Pitcher	CB (3)
2021	Jake Muholland	Pitcher	NCBWA (2)
2022	Cooper Hjerpe	Pitcher	ABCA (1), BA (1), CB (1), CBF (1), D1 (1), NCBWA (1), PG (1)
2022	Jacob Melton	Outfielder	ABCA (1), BA (1), CB (1), CBF (1), D1 (1), NCBWA (1), PG (1)
2022	Ben Ferrer	Pitcher	BA (3), D1 (3)
2022	Justin Boyd	Outfielder	NCBWA (2)
2024	Travis Bazzana	Infielder	ABCA (1), BA (1), NCBWA (1)
2024	Bridger Holmes	Relief Pitcher	ABCA (2), NCBWA (1)
2024	Aiden May	Pitcher	ABCA (3), NCBWA (3)
2024	Jacob Kmatz	Pitcher	NCBWA (3)
2024	Jacob Kmatz	Pitcher	NCBWA (3)
2024	Gavin Turley	Outfielder	ABCA (3)

=== National Awards ===
Buster Posey Award
Year	Name	Position
2019	Adley Rutschman	Catcher

Golden Spikes Award
Year	Name	Position
2019	Adley Rutschman	Catcher

National Pitcher of the Year Award
Year	Name
2018	Luke Heimlich
2022	Cooper Hjerpe

Dick Howser Trophy
Year	Name	Position
2019	Adley Rutschman	Catcher

Brooks Wallace Award
Year	Name	Position
2018	Cadyn Grenier	Shortstop

=== Conference Awards ===
Pac-12 Conference Player of the Year
Year	Name	Position
1981	Al Hunsinger	First Basemen
1982	Jim Wilson	First Basemen
1983	Jeff Reece	Pitcher
1986	Dave Brundage	Pitcher
1987	Ken Bowen	Shortstop
1993	Scott Christman	Pitcher
1994	Mason Smith	Pitcher
1998	Andrew Checketts	Pitcher
2005	Jacoby Ellsbury	Outfielder
2006	Cole Gillespie	Outfielder
2013	Michael Conforto	Outfielder
2014	Michael Conforto	Outfielder
2017	Nick Madrigal	Infielder
2019	Adley Rutschman	Catcher
2022	Jacob Melton	Outfielder
2024	Travis Bazzana	Infielder

Pac-12 Conference Pitcher of the Year
Year	Name
2014	Jace Fry
2017	Luke Heimlich
2018	Luke Heimlich

Pac-12 Conference Baseball Defensive Player of the Year
Year	Name	Position
2006	Chris Kunda	Second basemen
2016	Logan Ice	Catcher
2017	Nick Madrigal	Second basemen
2018	Cadyn Grenier	Shortstop
2019	Adley Rutschman	Catcher

Pac-12 Conference Baseball Freshman of the Year
Year	Name	Position
2005	Darwin Barney	Shortstop
2012	Michael Conforto	Outfielder
2013	Andrew Moore	Pitcher
2015	KJ Harrison	First basemen
2016	Nick Madrigal	Shortstop

== Other notable players ==
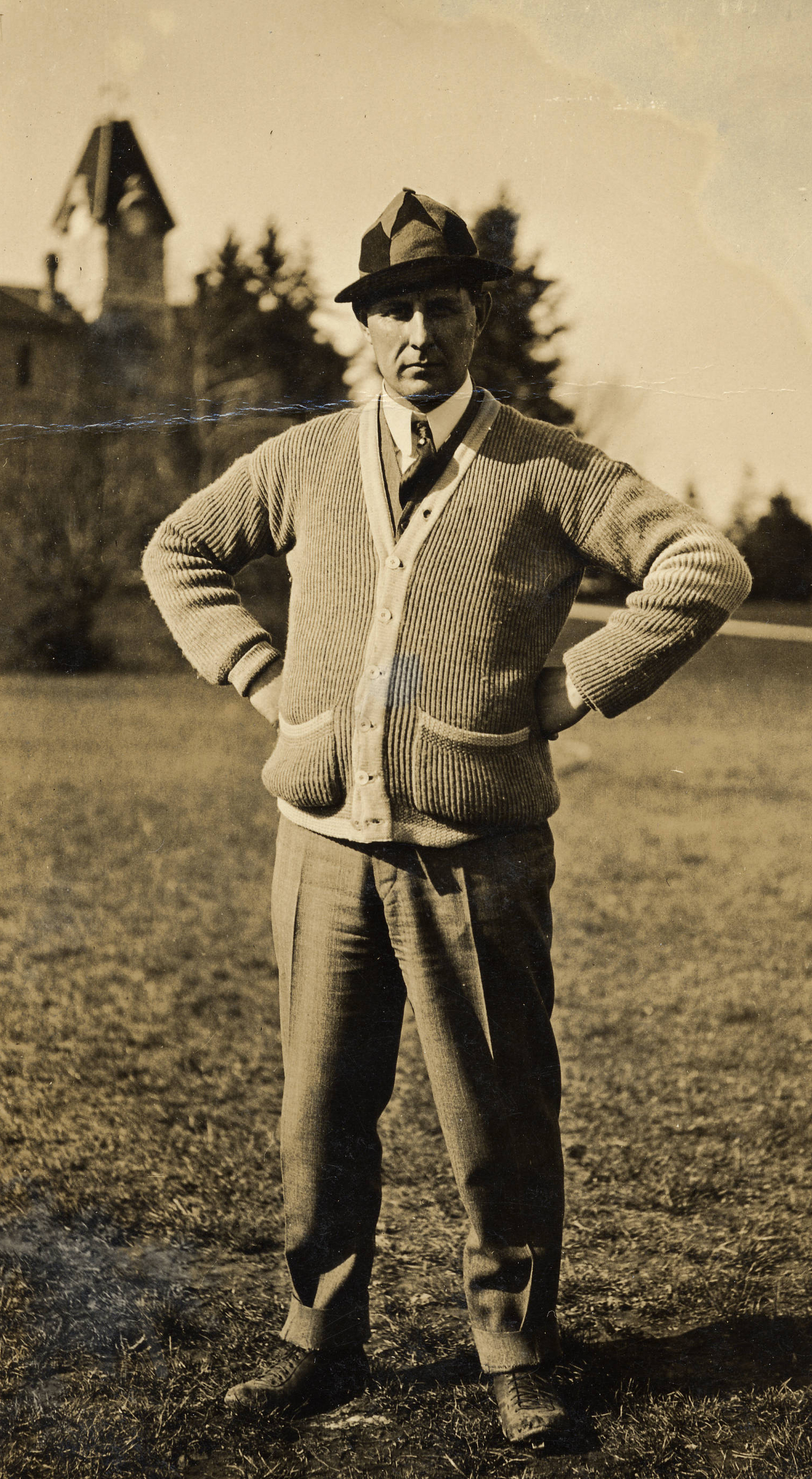
Fielder Jones was head coach in 1910.

- Scott Anderson – MLB pitcher 1987-1995.
- Brian Barden – MLB infielder 2007-2010 and Olympic Bronze Medalist.
- Lute Barnes – MLB player 1972–1973.
- Darwin Barney – MLB Infielder 2010-2017 and 2012 Gold Glove Award winner.
- Bob Beall – MLB Infielder 1975–1980.
- Matthew Boyd - MLB Pitcher for Detroit Tigers 2015-present.
- Jamie Burke – MLB catcher 2001-2010.
- Mitch Canham - Oregon State Head Coach & 2007 All-American.
- Ed Coleman – MLB Outfielder 1932–1936.
- Michael Conforto – MLB outfielder for New York Mets and MLB All Star. 2015–present.
- Jeff Doyle – MLB Infielder 1983.
- Glenn Elliott – MLB Pitcher 1947–1949.
- Jacoby Ellsbury – MLB Outfielder 2007–2017, MLB All-Star, Silver Slugger Award, Gold Glove Award and 2x World Series Champion.
- Ken Forsch – MLB pitcher from 1970–1986 and 2x MLB All-Star
- Jace Fry - MLB Pitcher for Chicago White Sox 2017-present.
- Sam Gaviglio - MLB Pitcher 2017-present.
- Cole Gillespie - MLB Outfielder 2010-2016.
- Tyler Graham - MLB Outfielder 2012.
- Cadyn Grenier - 2018 MLB 1st Round Draft Pick Baltimore Orioles.
- Don Johnson – MLB player from 1943–1948 and 2x MLB All-Star.
- Eddie Kunz – MLB Pitcher 2008.
- Steven Kwan - MLB Outfielder 2022-present.
- Trevor Larnach - 2018 MLB 1st Round Draft Pick Minnesota Twins.
- John Leovich – MLB Catcher 1941.
- Steve Lyons – MLB Player from 1985–1993 & current television sportscaster.
- Nick Madrigal - MLB Second baseman for Chicago White Sox and Chicago Cubs 2020-2024.
- Howard Maple – MLB Catcher 1932.
- Mark McLemore – MLB Pitcher 2007.
- Wade Meckler - MLB Outfielder 2023.
- Jacob Melton – MLB Outfielder 2025.
- Andrew Moore - MLB Pitcher 2017-2019.
- Jonah Nickerson – 2006 College World Series Most Outstanding Player.
- Joe Paterson – MLB Pitcher 2011–2014.
- Josh Osich - MLB Pitcher for Cincinnati Reds 2015-present.
- Drew Rasmussen - MLB Pitcher for Milwaukee Brewers 2020-present.
- Jorge Reyes – 2007 College World Series Most Outstanding Player (pitcher)
- Daniel Robertson – MLB Outfielder 2014–2017.
- Stefen Romero – MLB Outfielder 2014–2016. Outfielder for the Tohoku Rakuten Golden Eagles of the Nippon Professional Baseball League.
- Adley Rutschman - 2019 Golden Spikes Award Winner, 2018 College World Series Most Outstanding Player and 2019 MLB 1st overall pick.
- Wes Schulmerich – MLB Outfielder 1931–1934.
- Mike Stutes – MLB Pitcher 2011-2013.
- Andrew Susac – MLB catcher for Pittsburgh Pirates, 2014–2020.
- Mike Thurman – MLB Pitcher 1997–2002.
- Chris Wakeland – MLB Outfielder 2001.

== See also ==
- History of Oregon Agricultural Aggies baseball in the 1890s
- List of NCAA Division I baseball programs
