= 1998 NCAA Division I baseball season =

Baseball season

- Number of teams: 273

NCAA tournament

College World Series
- Champions: USC (12th title)
- Runners-up: Arizona State (18th CWS Appearance)
- Winning coach: Mike Gillespie (1st title)
- MOP: Wes Rachels (USC)

Seasons
- ← 1997 1999 →

The 1998 NCAA Division I baseball season, play of college baseball in the United States organized by the National Collegiate Athletic Association (NCAA) began in the spring of 1998. The season progressed through the regular season and concluded with the 1998 College World Series. The College World Series, held for the fifty second time in 1998, consisted of one team from each of eight regional competitions and was held in Omaha, Nebraska, at Johnny Rosenblatt Stadium as a double-elimination tournament. Southern California claimed the championship for the twelfth time, and first since 1978.

== Realignment ==
- Southeastern Louisiana left the Trans America Athletic Conference and joined the Southland Conference.
- Troy State joined the Trans America Athletic Conference from the Mid-Continent Conference.
- Oral Roberts joined the Mid-Continent Conference from the NCAA Division I independent ranks.
- Marshall departed the Southern Conference and Northern Illinois departed the Midwestern Collegiate Conference to join the Mid-American Conference.
- UNC Greensboro and Wofford joined the Southern Conference. UNC Greensboro had been in the Big South Conference, while Wofford joined from NCAA Division II.
- Marist and Rider left the Northeast Conference for the Metro Atlantic Athletic Conference. Marist joined the Northern Division, while Rider became a part of the Southern.
- Norfolk State joined the Mid-Eastern Athletic Conference from NCAA Division II.
- UAPB joined the Southwestern Athletic Conference from the NAIA.
- New Hampshire dropped baseball following the 1997 season.

=== Format changes ===
- The Big East Conference dissolved its divisions after one season.
- The Mid-American Conference divided into two divisions of six.
- The Southland Conference dissolved its divisions after two seasons.

== Conference winners ==
This is a partial list of conference champions from the 1998 season. The NCAA sponsored regional competitions to determine the College World Series participants. Each of the eight regionals consisted of six teams competing in double-elimination tournaments, with the winners advancing to Omaha. In order to provide all conference champions with an automatic bid, 10 conference champions participated in a play-in round. The five winners joined the other 19 conference champions with automatic bids, 24 teams earned at-large selections.

Conference	Regular season winner	Conference Tournament	Tournament Venue • City	Tournament Winner
America East Conference	Delaware	1998 America East Conference baseball tournament	Frawley Stadium • Wilmington, DE	Delaware
Atlantic Coast Conference	Florida State	1998 Atlantic Coast Conference baseball tournament	Durham Bulls Athletic Park • Durham, NC	Wake Forest
Big 12 Conference	Texas A&M	1998 Big 12 Conference baseball tournament	AT&T Bricktown Ballpark • Oklahoma City, OK	Texas Tech
Big East Conference	Rutgers	1998 Big East Conference baseball tournament	Senator Thomas J. Dodd Memorial Stadium • Norwich, CT	Rutgers
Big South Conference	Liberty	1998 Big South Conference baseball tournament	Knights Stadium • Fort Mill, SC	Liberty
Big Ten Conference	Illinois	1998 Big Ten Conference baseball tournament	Illinois Field • Champaign, IL	Minnesota
Big West Conference	North - Nevada; South - Cal State Fullerton	1998 Big West Conference baseball tournament	Titan Field • Fullerton, CA	Long Beach State
Colonial Athletic Association	VCU	1998 Colonial Athletic Association baseball tournament	Grainger Stadium • Kinston, NC	Richmond
Conference USA	Tulane	1998 Conference USA baseball tournament	Zephyr Field • New Orleans, LA	Tulane
Ivy League	Gehrig - Princeton; Rolfe - Harvard	1998 Ivy League Baseball Championship Series	Yale Field • New Haven, CT	Harvard
Metro Atlantic Athletic Conference	Northern - Le Moyne; Southern - Rider	1998 Metro Atlantic Athletic Conference baseball tournament	Dutchess Stadium • Wappingers Falls, NY	Le Moyne
Mid-American Conference	East - Bowling Green; West - Ball State	1998 Mid-American Conference baseball tournament	Warren E. Steller Field • Bowling Green, OH	Bowling Green
Midwestern Collegiate Conference	Butler	1998 Midwestern Collegiate Conference baseball tournament	Les Miller Field • Chicago, IL	Butler
Mid-Continent Conference	Eastern - C. W. Post; Western - Oral Roberts	1998 Mid-Continent Conference baseball tournament	J. L. Johnson Stadium • Tulsa, OK	Oral Roberts
Northeast Conference	Monmouth/St. Francis	1998 Northeast Conference baseball tournament	Cochrane Stadium • Jersey City, NJ	Monmouth
Pacific-10 Conference	North - Washington; South - Stanford	no tournament		
Patriot League	Navy	1998 Patriot League baseball tournament	Max Bishop Stadium • Annapolis, MD	Navy
Southeastern Conference	Eastern - Florida; Western - LSU	1998 Southeastern Conference baseball tournament	Golden Park • Columbus, GA	Auburn
Southern Conference	UNC Greensboro	1998 Southern Conference baseball tournament	Joseph P. Riley Jr. Park • Charleston, SC	The Citadel
Southland Conference	Northwestern State	1998 Southland Conference baseball tournament	Fair Grounds Field • Shreveport, LA	Nicholls State
Trans America Athletic Conference	Eastern - Georgia State; Southern - FIU; Western - Troy State	1998 Trans America Athletic Conference baseball tournament	Osceola County Stadium • Kissimmee, FL	FIU
West Coast Conference	Loyola Marymount	No tournament		

== Conference standings ==
The following is an incomplete list of conference standings:

1998 Atlantic Coast Conference baseball standings
	Conf.				Overall
Team	W		L	PCT	W		L	PCT
No. 8 Florida State ‍†‍‍^{y}	18	–	4	.818	53	–	20	.726
No. 15 Georgia Tech ‍‍‍^{y}	14	–	9	.609	41	–	22	.651
No. 23 Clemson ‍‍‍^{y}	14	–	9	.609	43	–	16	.729
NC State ‍‍‍^{y}	12	–	9	.571	39	–	21	.650
No. 27 Wake Forest ‍‍‡‍^{y}	13	–	10	.565	43	–	23	.652
No. 18 North Carolina ‍‍‍^{y}	13	–	10	.565	42	–	23	.646
Duke ‍‍‍	8	–	15	.348	38	–	20	.655
Maryland ‍‍‍	5	–	18	.217	26	–	30	.464
Virginia ‍‍‍	5	–	18	.217	28	–	26	.519
† – Conference champion ‡ – Tournament champion y – Invited to the NCAA tournament As of June 30, 1998; Rankings from Collegiate Baseball

1998 Big 12 Conference baseball standings
	Conf.						Overall
Team	W		L		T	PCT	W		L		T	PCT
No. 14 Texas A&M ‍†‍‍^{y}	21	–	9	–	0	.700	46	–	20	–	0	.697
No. 28 Baylor ‍‍‍^{y}	18	–	10	–	0	.643	41	–	20	–	1	.669
No. 29 Texas Tech ‍‍‡‍^{y}	18	–	11	–	0	.621	44	–	20	–	0	.688
No. 22 Oklahoma ‍‍‍^{y}	17	–	11	–	0	.607	42	–	20	–	0	.677
Missouri ‍‍‍	17	–	12	–	0	.586	36	–	18	–	0	.667
Oklahoma State ‍‍‍^{y}	15	–	12	–	0	.556	40	–	21	–	0	.656
Nebraska ‍‍‍	10	–	13	–	0	.435	24	–	20	–	0	.545
Texas ‍‍‍	11	–	18	–	0	.379	23	–	32	–	1	.420
Iowa State ‍‍‍	10	–	18	–	0	.357	20	–	27	–	0	.426
Kansas State ‍‍‍	9	–	19	–	0	.321	20	–	32	–	0	.385
Kansas ‍‍‍	7	–	20	–	0	.259	22	–	29	–	0	.431
† – Conference champion ‡ – Tournament champion y – Invited to the NCAA tournament As of June 30, 1998; Rankings from Collegiate Baseball

1998 Big East Conference baseball standings
	Conf.						Overall
Team	W		L		T	PCT	W		L		T	PCT
No. 30 Rutgers ‍†‍‡‍^{y}	17	–	3	–	0	.850	33	–	16	–	0	.673
Notre Dame ‍‍‍	15	–	4	–	0	.789	41	–	17	–	0	.707
St. John's ‍‍‍	14	–	7	–	0	.667	28	–	17	–	1	.620
Providence ‍‍‍	14	–	8	–	1	.630	31	–	22	–	1	.583
West Virginia ‍‍‍	13	–	9	–	0	.591	37	–	17	–	1	.682
Seton Hall ‍‍‍	12	–	10	–	0	.545	25	–	23	–	0	.521
Connecticut ‍‍‍	12	–	11	–	0	.522	25	–	17	–	0	.595
Villanova ‍‍‍	6	–	15	–	0	.286	26	–	21	–	1	.552
Pittsburgh ‍‍‍	5	–	16	–	0	.238	12	–	27	–	1	.313
Boston College ‍‍‍	4	–	15	–	1	.225	17	–	23	–	1	.427
Georgetown ‍‍‍	5	–	19	–	0	.208	22	–	34	–	0	.393
† – Conference champion ‡ – Tournament champion y – Invited to the NCAA tournament As of June 30, 1998; Rankings from Collegiate Baseball

1998 Big South Conference baseball standings
	Conf.				Overall
Team	W		L	PCT	W		L	PCT
Liberty ‍†‍‡‍^{y}	13	–	5	.722	32	–	29	.525
Coastal Carolina ‍‍‍	11	–	7	.611	31	–	29	.517
UNC Asheville ‍‍‍	10	–	8	.556	27	–	32	.458
Winthrop ‍‍‍	10	–	8	.556	35	–	22	.614
Charleston Southern ‍‍‍	9	–	9	.500	24	–	29	.453
Radford ‍‍‍	7	–	11	.389	17	–	35	.327
UMBC ‍‍‍	3	–	15	.167	10	–	37	.213
† – Conference champion ‡ – Tournament champion y – Invited to the NCAA tournament As of June 30, 1998; Rankings from Collegiate Baseball

1998 Big Ten Conference baseball standings
	Conf.				Overall
Team	W		L	PCT	W		L	PCT
Illinois ‍†‍‍^{y}	19	–	5	.792	39	–	19	.672
Minnesota ‍‍‡‍^{y}	19	–	9	.679	43	–	13	.768
Ohio State ‍‍‍	18	–	9	.667	36	–	16	.692
Penn State ‍‍‍	15	–	11	.577	28	–	24	.538
Indiana ‍‍‍	14	–	14	.500	29	–	27	.518
Iowa ‍‍‍	9	–	15	.375	19	–	27	.413
Michigan ‍‍‍	9	–	15	.375	21	–	27	.438
Northwestern ‍‍‍	10	–	18	.357	27	–	26	.509
Purdue ‍‍‍	9	–	18	.333	23	–	29	.442
Michigan State ‍‍‍	8	–	16	.333	25	–	27	.481
x – Division champion ‡ – Tournament champion y – Invited to the NCAA tournament As of June 30, 1998; Rankings from Collegiate Baseball

1998 Big West Conference baseball standings
	Conf.				Overall
Team	W		L	PCT	W		L	PCT
Northern
Nevada ^{x}‍‍‍	17	–	10	.630	31	–	22	.585
Sacramento State ‍‍‍	15	–	19	.441	23	–	25	.479
Pacific ‍‍‍	12	–	17	.414	25	–	22	.532
New Mexico State ‍‍‍	8	–	21	.276	23	–	29	.442
Southern
No. 11 Cal State Fullerton ^{x}‍‍‍	25	–	5	.833	47	–	17	.734
No. 4 Long Beach State ‍‍‡‍	23	–	7	.767	37	–	20	.649
UC Santa Barbara ‍‍‍	11	–	18	.379	18	–	30	.375
Cal Poly ‍‍‍	7	–	21	.250	16	–	42	.276
† – Conference champion ‡ – Tournament champion y – Invited to the 1998 NCAA Division I baseball tournament As of June 30, 1985; Rankings from Collegiate Baseball

1998 Colonial Athletic Association baseball standings
	Conf.						Overall
Team	W		L		T	PCT	W		L		T	PCT
No. 26 VCU ‍†‍‍^{y}	18	–	2	–	0	.900	46	–	15	–	0	.754
Richmond ‍‍‡‍^{y}	15	–	6	–	0	.714	41	–	17	–	1	.703
James Madison ‍‍‍	11	–	8	–	0	.579	27	–	29	–	0	.482
East Carolina ‍‍‍	10	–	11	–	0	.476	30	–	29	–	0	.508
Old Dominion ‍‍‍	9	–	12	–	0	.429	28	–	29	–	0	.491
George Mason ‍‍‍	8	–	12	–	0	.400	26	–	28	–	0	.481
UNC Wilmington ‍‍‍	6	–	14	–	0	.300	21	–	34	–	0	.382
William & Mary ‍‍‍	4	–	16	–	0	.200	24	–	28	–	0	.462
† – Conference champion ‡ – Tournament champion y – Invited to the NCAA tournament As of June 30, 1998; Rankings from Collegiate Baseball

1998 Conference USA baseball standings
	Conf.				Overall
Team	W		L	PCT	W		L	PCT
No. 25 Tulane ‍†‍‡‍^{y}	22	–	5	.815	48	–	15	.762
Houston ‍‍‍	21	–	6	.778	34	–	25	.576
UNC Charlotte ‍‍‍^{y}	19	–	8	.704	43	–	19	.694
UAB ‍‍‍	15	–	12	.556	29	–	24	.547
Louisville ‍‍‍	14	–	13	.519	31	–	24	.564
Southern Miss ‍‍‍	12	–	15	.444	30	–	28	.517
Memphis ‍‍‍	12	–	15	.444	10	–	24	.294
South Florida ‍‍‍	9	–	18	.333	21	–	36	.368
Saint Louis ‍‍‍	4	–	20	.167	10	–	38	.208
Cincinnati ‍‍‍	4	–	20	.167	15	–	38	.283
† – Conference champion ‡ – Tournament champion y – Invited to the NCAA tournament As of June 30, 1998; Rankings from Collegiate Baseball

1998 NCAA Division I baseball independents standings
	Conf.				Overall
Team	W		L	PCT	W		L	PCT
No. 5 Miami (FL) ‍‍‍^{y}		–		–	51	–	12	.810
Cal State Northridge ‍‍‍		–		–	37	–	19	.661
Elon ‍‍‍		–		–	26	–	22	.542
Belmont ‍‍‍		–		–	23	–	21	.523
Southern Utah ‍‍‍		–		–	22	–	26	.458
Hawaii–Hilo ‍‍‍		–		–	16	–	34	.320
y – Invited to the NCAA tournament As of June 30, 1998; Rankings from Collegiate Baseball

1998 Ivy League baseball standings
	Conf.						Overall
Team	W		L		T	PCT	W		L		T	PCT
Lou Gehrig
Princeton ^{x}‍‍‍	13	–	7	–	0	.650	25	–	14	–	0	.641
Cornell ‍‍‍	12	–	8	–	0	.600	18	–	18	–	1	.500
Penn ‍‍‍	9	–	11	–	0	.450	14	–	21	–	1	.403
Columbia ‍‍‍	5	–	15	–	0	.250	10	–	31	–	0	.244
Red Rolfe
Harvard ^{x}‍‍‡‍^{y}	16	–	4	–	0	.800	36	–	12	–	0	.750
Yale ‍‍‍	11	–	9	–	0	.550	21	–	21	–	0	.500
Dartmouth ‍‍‍	7	–	13	–	0	.350	23	–	18	–	0	.561
Brown ‍‍‍	7	–	13	–	0	.350	12	–	34	–	0	.261
x – Division champion ‡ – Championship Series champion y – Invited to the NCAA tournament As of June 30, 1998; Rankings from Collegiate Baseball

1998 Metro Atlantic Athletic Conference baseball standings
	Conf.				Overall
Team	W		L	PCT	W		L	PCT
Northern
Le Moyne ^{x}‍‍‡‍^{y}	20	–	6	.769	26	–	15	.634
Marist ‍‍‍	18	–	8	.692	30	–	17	.638
Siena ‍‍‍	11	–	15	.423	17	–	32	.347
Niagara ‍‍‍	11	–	15	.423	17	–	23	.425
Canisius ‍‍‍	7	–	19	.269	10	–	30	.250
Southern
Rider ^{x}‍‍‍	16	–	10	.615	25	–	25	.500
Iona ‍‍‍	15	–	11	.577	22	–	26	.458
Manhattan ‍‍‍	14	–	12	.538	20	–	21	.488
Fairfield ‍‍‍	12	–	14	.462	19	–	25	.432
Saint Peter's ‍‍‍	6	–	20	.231	7	–	34	.171
x – Division champion ‡ – Tournament champion y – Invited to the NCAA tournament As of June 30, 1998; Rankings from Collegiate Baseball

1998 Mid-Continent Conference baseball standings
	Conf.				Overall
Team	W		L	PCT	W		L	PCT
East
C.W. Post ^{x}‍‍‍	12	–	2	.857	21	–	21	.500
Youngstown State ‍‍‍	5	–	6	.455	17	–	31	.354
Central Connecticut ‍‍‍	6	–	8	.429	24	–	22	.522
Pace ‍‍‍	5	–	7	.417	14	–	26	.350
NYIT ‍‍‍	5	–	10	.333	13	–	28	.317
West
Oral Roberts ^{x}‍‍‡‍^{y}	18	–	6	.750	45	–	20	.692
Valparaiso ‍‍‍	13	–	9	.591	31	–	23	.574
Western Illinois ‍‍‍	12	–	10	.545	15	–	28	.349
Chicago State ‍‍‍	9	–	14	.391	19	–	21	.475
Northeastern Illinois ‍‍‍	5	–	19	.208	10	–	33	.233
‡ – Tournament champion y – Invited to the NCAA tournament As of June 30, 1998; Rankings from Collegiate Baseball

1998 Mid-American Conference baseball standings
	Conf.						Overall
Team	W		L		T	PCT	W		L		T	PCT
East
Bowling Green ^{x}‍‍‡‍^{y}	17	–	10	–	0	.630	34	–	21	–	0	.618
Kent State ‍‍‍	17	–	12	–	0	.586	27	–	28	–	0	.491
Miami ‍‍‍	17	–	13	–	0	.567	33	–	26	–	0	.559
Ohio ‍‍‍	13	–	17	–	0	.433	31	–	24	–	0	.564
Akron ‍‍‍	10	–	18	–	0	.357	20	–	31	–	0	.392
Marshall ‍‍‍	9	–	21	–	0	.300	18	–	35	–	0	.340
West
Ball State ^{x}‍‍‍	23	–	8	–	0	.742	39	–	18	–	0	.684
Central Michigan ‍‍‍	23	–	9	–	0	.719	34	–	25	–	0	.576
Western Michigan ‍‍‍	16	–	16	–	0	.500	26	–	29	–	0	.473
Eastern Michigan ‍‍‍	14	–	16	–	0	.467	27	–	27	–	0	.500
Toledo ‍‍‍	13	–	17	–	0	.433	20	–	32	–	0	.385
Northern Illinois ‍‍‍	8	–	23	–	0	.258	10	–	30	–	1	.256
† – Conference champion ‡ – Tournament champion y – Invited to the NCAA tournament As of June 30, 1998; Rankings from Collegiate Baseball

1998 Midwestern Collegiate Conference baseball standings
	Conf.				Overall
Team	W		L	PCT	W		L	PCT
Butler ‍‍‡‍^{y}	13	–	5	.722	33	–	21	.611
Milwaukee ‍‍‍	14	–	6	.700	33	–	15	.688
Detroit ‍‍‍	10	–	8	.556	20	–	21	.488
Wright State ‍‍‍	9	–	11	.450	20	–	34	.370
Cleveland State ‍‍‍	8	–	11	.421	21	–	32	.396
UIC ‍‍‍	3	–	16	.158	11	–	25	.306
‡ – Tournament champion y – Invited to the NCAA Tournament; As of June 30, 1998; Rankings from Collegiate Baseball

1998 Northeast Conference baseball standings
	Conf.						Overall
Team	W		L		T	PCT	W		L		T	PCT
St. Francis ‍†‍‍	10	–	5	–	0	.667	26	–	12	–	1	.679
Monmouth ‍†‍‡‍^{y}	10	–	5	–	0	.667	30	–	21	–	0	.588
Long Island ‍‍‍	9	–	6	–	0	.600	24	–	14	–	0	.632
Mount St. Mary's ‍‍‍	6	–	9	–	0	.400	9	–	28	–	0	.243
Fairleigh Dickinson ‍‍‍	6	–	9	–	0	.400	15	–	24	–	0	.385
Wagner ‍‍‍	4	–	11	–	0	.267	10	–	35	–	1	.228
† – Conference champion ‡ – Tournament champion y – Invited to the NCAA tournament Rankings from Collegiate Baseball

1998 Pacific-10 Conference baseball standings
	Conf.				Overall
Team	W		L	PCT	W		L	PCT
Northern
No. 13 Washington ^{x}‍‍‍^{y}	17	–	7	.708	41	–	17	.707
Oregon State ‍‍‍	15	–	9	.625	35	–	14	.714
Washington State ‍‍‍	12	–	12	.500	25	–	24	.510
Portland State ‍‍‍	4	–	20	.167	17	–	34	.333
Southern
No. 9 Stanford ^{x}‍‍‍^{y}	22	–	8	.733	42	–	14	.750
No. 1 Southern California ‍‍‍^{y}	21	–	9	.700	49	–	17	.742
No. 2 Arizona State ‍‍‍^{y}	18	–	11	.621	41	–	23	.641
Arizona ‍‍‍	12	–	18	.400	33	–	23	.589
UCLA ‍‍‍	11	–	19	.367	23	–	33	.411
California ‍‍‍	5	–	24	.172	22	–	32	.407
x – Division champion y – Invited to the NCAA tournament As of June 30, 1998; Rankings from Collegiate Baseball

1998 Patriot League baseball standings
	Conf.				Overall
Team	W		L	PCT	W		L	PCT
Navy ‍†‍‡‍	15	–	5	.750	26	–	17	.605
Bucknell ‍‍‍	13	–	7	.650	31	–	17	.646
Army ‍‍‍	12	–	8	.600	26	–	29	.473
Lafayette ‍‍‍	8	–	12	.400	10	–	26	.278
Lehigh ‍‍‍	7	–	13	.350	13	–	26	.333
Holy Cross ‍‍‍	5	–	15	.250	7	–	29	.194
‡ – Tournament champion As of June 30, 1998; Rankings from Collegiate Baseball

1998 Southeastern Conference baseball standings
	Conf.				Overall
Team	W		L	PCT	W		L	PCT
Eastern Division
No. 7 Florida ^{x}‍†‍‍^{y}	21	–	8	.724	46	–	18	.719
No. 19 South Carolina ‍‍‍^{y}	19	–	10	.655	42	–	16	.724
Kentucky ‍‍‍	12	–	18	.400	26	–	31	.456
Tennessee ‍‍‍	11	–	17	.393	36	–	20	.643
Georgia ‍‍‍	8	–	21	.276	24	–	30	.444
Vanderbilt ‍‍‍	6	–	24	.200	25	–	28	.472
Western Division
No. 3 LSU ^{x}‍‍‍^{y}	21	–	9	.700	48	–	19	.716
No. 16 Alabama ‍‍‍^{y}	19	–	10	.655	43	–	16	.729
No. 12 Auburn ‍‍‡‍^{y}	16	–	12	.571	46	–	18	.719
No. 6 Mississippi State ‍‍‍^{y}	14	–	15	.483	37	–	20	.649
Arkansas ‍‍‍^{y}	13	–	14	.481	37	–	19	.661
Ole Miss ‍‍‍	13	–	15	.464	30	–	23	.566
x – Division champion † – Conference champion ‡ – Tournament champion y – Invited to the NCAA tournament As of June 30, 1998; Rankings from Collegiate Baseball

1998 Southern Conference baseball standings
	Conf.				Overall
Team	W		L	PCT	W		L	PCT
UNC Greensboro ‍†‍‍	22	–	5	.815	40	–	18	.690
The Citadel ‍‍‡‍^{y}	21	–	5	.808	37	–	24	.607
Western Carolina ‍‍‍	20	–	6	.769	42	–	15	.737
Furman ‍‍‍	12	–	12	.500	21	–	27	.438
Wofford ‍‍‍	10	–	12	.455	15	–	32	.319
Georgia Southern ‍‍‍	9	–	15	.375	22	–	30	.423
Davidson ‍‍‍	8	–	16	.333	13	–	38	.255
East Tennessee State ‍‍‍	8	–	18	.308	18	–	31	.367
VMI ‍‍‍	7	–	17	.292	14	–	35	.286
Appalachian State ‍‍‍	6	–	17	.261	13	–	28	.317
† – Conference champion ‡ – SoCon Tournament champion y – Invited to the NCAA tournament As of June 30, 1998; Rankings from Collegiate Baseball

1998 Southland Conference baseball standings
	Conf.				Overall
Team	W		L	PCT	W		L	PCT
Northwestern State ‍†‍‍	15	–	8	.652	40	–	20	.667
Northeast Louisiana ‍‍‍	13	–	9	.591	33	–	22	.600
McNeese State ‍‍‍	13	–	10	.565	30	–	26	.536
Nicholls State ‍‍‡‍^{y}	13	–	11	.542	28	–	34	.452
Southwest Texas State ‍‍‍	13	–	11	.542	28	–	28	.500
Sam Houston State ‍‍‍	12	–	11	.522	29	–	28	.509
Texas–Arlington ‍‍‍	9	–	13	.409	20	–	29	.408
Southeastern Louisiana ‍‍‍	9	–	14	.391	29	–	27	.518
Texas–San Antonio ‍‍‍	7	–	17	.292	23	–	28	.451
† – Conference champion ‡ – Tournament champion y – Invited to the NCAA tournament As of June 30, 1998; Rankings from Collegiate Baseball

1998 Trans America Athletic Conference baseball standings
	Conf.						Overall
Team	W		L		T	PCT	W		L		T	PCT
South
FIU ^{x}‍†‍‡‍^{y}	15	–	5	–	0	.750	41	–	24	–	0	.631
UCF ‍‍‍	14	–	7	–	0	.667	41	–	21	–	0	.661
Stetson ‍‍‍	9	–	12	–	0	.429	30	–	31	–	1	.492
Florida Atlantic ‍‍‍	6	–	14	–	0	.300	29	–	30	–	0	.492
East
Georgia State ^{x}‍‍‍	11	–	9	–	0	.550	23	–	29	–	0	.442
College of Charleston ‍‍‍	10	–	11	–	0	.476	31	–	26	–	0	.544
Campbell ‍‍‍	10	–	11	–	0	.476	28	–	30	–	0	.483
Mercer ‍‍‍	7	–	13	–	0	.350	27	–	26	–	1	.509
West
Troy State ^{x}‍‍‍	13	–	7	–	0	.650	37	–	21	–	0	.638
Jacksonville State ‍‍‍	13	–	8	–	0	.619	34	–	20	–	0	.630
Centenary ‍‍‍	9	–	12	–	0	.429	21	–	36	–	0	.368
Samford ‍‍‍	6	–	14	–	0	.300	13	–	43	–	0	.232
x – Division champion † – Conference champion ‡ – Tournament champion y – Invited to the NCAA tournament As of June 30, 1998; Rankings from Collegiate Baseball

== College World Series ==
The 1998 season marked the fifty second NCAA baseball tournament, which culminated with the eight team College World Series. The College World Series was held in Omaha, Nebraska. The eight teams played a double-elimination format, with Southern California claiming their record twelfth championship with a 21–14 win over Arizona State in the final.

=== Bracket ===
First round
1	Florida	13
8	Mississippi State	14
4	Southern California	10
5	LSU	12
1	Florida	10
4	Southern California	12^{11}
2	Miami (FL)	3
7	Long Beach State	1
3	Florida State	10
6	Arizona State	11
7	Long Beach State	7
3	Florida State	4

Second round
8	Mississippi State	8
5	LSU	10
8	Mississippi State	1
4	Southern California	7
2	Miami (FL)	2
6	Arizona State	9
2	Miami (FL)	3
7	Long Beach State	6

Semifinals
5	LSU	4	3
4	Southern California	5	7
6	Arizona State	14	—
7	Long Beach State	4	—

Finals
4	Southern California	21
6	Arizona State	14
