= 1998 Mississippi State Bulldogs baseball team =

American college baseball season

1998 Mississippi State Bulldogs baseball

NCAA Central Regional champions

College World Series, 1–2
- Conference: Southeastern Conference
- CB: No. 6
- Record: 42–23 (14–15 SEC)
- Head coach: Pat McMahon (1st season)
- Home stadium: Dudy Noble Field

1998 Southeastern Conference baseball standings
| | Conf. | | | | Overall |
| Team | W | | L | PCT | W | | L | PCT |
|---|---|---|---|---|---|---|---|---|
Eastern Division
| No. 7 Florida ^{x}‍†‍‍^{y} | 21 | – | 8 | .724 | 46 | – | 18 | .719 |
| No. 19 South Carolina ‍‍‍^{y} | 19 | – | 10 | .655 | 42 | – | 16 | .724 |
| Kentucky ‍‍‍ | 12 | – | 18 | .400 | 26 | – | 31 | .456 |
| Tennessee ‍‍‍ | 11 | – | 17 | .393 | 36 | – | 20 | .643 |
| Georgia ‍‍‍ | 8 | – | 21 | .276 | 24 | – | 30 | .444 |
| Vanderbilt ‍‍‍ | 6 | – | 24 | .200 | 25 | – | 28 | .472 |
Western Division
| No. 3 LSU ^{x}‍‍‍^{y} | 21 | – | 9 | .700 | 48 | – | 19 | .716 |
| No. 16 Alabama ‍‍‍^{y} | 19 | – | 10 | .655 | 43 | – | 16 | .729 |
| No. 12 Auburn ‍‍‡‍^{y} | 16 | – | 12 | .571 | 46 | – | 18 | .719 |
| No. 6 Mississippi State ‍‍‍^{y} | 14 | – | 15 | .483 | 37 | – | 20 | .649 |
| Arkansas ‍‍‍^{y} | 13 | – | 14 | .481 | 37 | – | 19 | .661 |
| Ole Miss ‍‍‍ | 13 | – | 15 | .464 | 30 | – | 23 | .566 |
x – Division champion † – Conference champion ‡ – Tournament champion y – Invited to the NCAA tournament As of June 30, 1998; Rankings from Collegiate Baseball

The 1998 Mississippi State Bulldogs baseball team represented Mississippi State University in the 1998 NCAA Division I baseball season. They were led by head coach Pat McMahon in his first season and played their home games at Dudy Noble Field. The Bulldogs were members of the Southeastern Conference, and finished with a record of 42–23, fourth in the SEC West with a record of 14–15.

Mississippi State was invited to the NCAA Tournament, where they won the Central Regional to advance to their seventh College World Series. The Bulldogs tied for fifth, recording a win against Florida and losses to eventual semifinalist LSU and champion USC.

== Personnel ==
=== Roster ===
1998 Mississippi State Bulldogs roster
| Pitchers: 16 - Chris Reinike - Junior; 17 - Matt Ginter - Sophomore; 18 - Mark Freed - Freshman; 19 - Justin Estel - Freshman; 21 - Kevin Donovan - Sophomore; 23 - Van Johnson - Senior; 25 - Jeremy Jackson - Junior; 30 - Brian Compton - Junior; 34 - Hank Thoms - Junior; 42 - Scott Polk - Junior | Catchers: 8 - Barry Patton - Senior; 33 - Ryan McGrath - Sophomore; Outfielders: 6 - Brian Terry - Sophomore; 15 - Brian Wiese - Junior; 24 - Brooks Bryan - Senior; 32 - Rusty Thoms - Senior; Utility: 35 - Josh West - Freshman | Infielders: 2 - Phillip Willingham - Freshman; 4 - Dustin Dabbs - Senior; 5 - Lake Thoms - Junior; 9 - Matt Peeples - Senior; 10 - Richard Lee - Senior; 12 - Brad Freeman - Senior; 14 - Travis Chapman - Sophomore; 27 - Chris Lotterhos - Junior; 45 - Jon Knott - Freshman |

=== Coaching staff ===
1998 Mississippi State Bulldogs coaching staff
- 26 - Pat McMahon - Head coach – 1st season
- 28 - Jim Case - Assistant coach- 5th season
- 22 - Tommy Raffo - Assistant coach - 5th season

== Schedule ==
Legend
| | Mississippi State win |
| | Mississippi State loss |
| * | Non-Conference game |

1998 Mississippi State Bulldogs baseball game log
Regular season

February
| Date | Opponent | Site/stadium | Score | Overall record | SEC record |
|---|---|---|---|---|---|
| Feb 17 | South Alabama* | Dudy Noble Field • Starkville, MS | L 13–14 ^{(12)} | 0–1 | |
| Feb 18 | South Alabama* | Dudy Noble Field • Starkville, MS | W 11–6 | 1–1 | |
| Feb 19 | Jackson State* | Dudy Noble Field • Starkville, MS | W 19–3 ^{(7)} | 2–1 | |
| Feb 21 | Louisiana Tech* | Dudy Noble Field • Starkville, MS | W 10–4 | 3–1 | |
| Feb 23 | Mississippi Valley State* | Dudy Noble Field • Starkville, MS | W 27–1 ^{(7)} | 4–1 | |
| Feb 24 | Alcorn State* | Dudy Noble Field • Starkville, MS | W 18–4 ^{(8)} | 5–1 | |
| Feb 25 | Jackson State* | Dudy Noble Field • Starkville, MS | W 18–0 ^{(8)} | 6–1 | |
| Feb 27 | vs LSU* | Louisiana Superdome • New Orleans, LA (Winn-Dixie Showdown) | W 11–3 | 7–1 | |
| Feb 28 | vs New Orleans* | Louisiana Superdome • New Orleans, LA (Winn-Dixie Showdown) | L 8–10 | 7–2 | |

March
| Date | Opponent | Site/stadium | Score | Overall record | SEC record |
|---|---|---|---|---|---|
| Mar 1 | vs Tulane* | Louisiana Superdome • New Orleans, LA (Winn-Dixie Showdown) | W 4–1 | 8–2 | |
| Mar 3 | Memphis* | Dudy Noble Field • Starkville, MS | W 8–7 ^{(10)} | 9–2 | |
| Mar 4 | Memphis* | Dudy Noble Field • Starkville, MS | W 9–1 | 10–2 | |
| Mar 6 | Tennessee | Dudy Noble Field • Starkville, MS | W 15–7 | 11–2 | 1–0 |
| Mar 8 | Tennessee | Dudy Noble Field • Starkville, MS | L 4–22 ^{(7)} | 11–3 | 1–1 |
| Mar 8 | Tennessee | Dudy Noble Field • Starkville, MS | L 2–4 ^{(7)} | 11–4 | 1–2 |
| Mar 10 | at Northeast Louisiana* | Warhawk Field • Monroe, LA | W 4–3 | 12–4 | |
| Mar 11 | at Northeast Louisiana* | Warhawk Field • Monroe, LA | W 4–3 ^{(11)} | 13–4 | |
| Mar 13 | at Florida | Alfred A. McKethan Stadium • Gainesville, FL | L 8–14 | 13–5 | 1–3 |
| Mar 14 | at Florida | Alfred A. McKethan Stadium • Gainesville, FL | L 5–6 | 13–6 | 1–4 |
| Mar 15 | at Florida | Alfred A. McKethan Stadium • Gainesville, FL | L 5–6 | 13–7 | 1–5 |
| Mar 18 | William Carey* | Dudy Noble Field • Starkville, MS | W 4–2 | 14–7 | |
| Mar 20 | Ole Miss | Dudy Noble Field • Starkville, MS | W 2–1 | 15–7 | 2–5 |
| Mar 21 | Ole Miss | Dudy Noble Field • Starkville, MS | L 5–7 | 15–8 | 2–6 |
| Mar 22 | Ole Miss | Dudy Noble Field • Starkville, MS | W 9–3 | 16–8 | 3–6 |
| Mar 25 | Samford* | Dudy Noble Field • Starkville, MS | W 16–3 | 17–8 | |
| Mar 27 | at Alabama | Sewell–Thomas Stadium • Tuscaloosa, AL | L 10–12 ^{(10)} | 17–9 | 3–7 |
| Mar 28 | at Alabama | Sewell–Thomas Stadium • Tuscaloosa, AL | L 2–4 | 17–10 | 3–8 |
| Mar 29 | at Alabama | Sewell–Thomas Stadium • Tuscaloosa, AL | W 13–7 | 18–10 | 4–8 |

April
| Date | Opponent | Rank | Site/stadium | Score | Overall record | SEC record |
|---|---|---|---|---|---|---|
| Apr 1 | vs Ole Miss* | | Smith–Wills Stadium • Jackson, MS (Mayor's Trophy) | W 6–2 | 19–10 | |
| Apr 3 | at LSU | | Alex Box Stadium • Baton Rouge, LA | L 5–8 | 19–11 | 4–9 |
| Apr 4 | at LSU | | Alex Box Stadium • Baton Rouge, LA | W 8–3 | 20–11 | 5–9 |
| Apr 5 | at LSU | | Alex Box Stadium • Baton Rouge, LA | L 5–11 | 20–12 | 5–10 |
| Apr 7 | New Orleans* | | Dudy Noble Field • Starkville, MS | W 8–6 | 21–12 | |
| Apr 8 | New Orleans* | | Dudy Noble Field • Starkville, MS | W 7–6 ^{(10)} | 22–12 | |
| Apr 10 | Kentucky | | Dudy Noble Field • Starkville, MS | W 3–2 | 23–12 | 6–10 |
| Apr 11 | Kentucky | | Dudy Noble Field • Starkville, MS | L 2–3 | 23–13 | 6–11 |
| Apr 12 | Kentucky | | Dudy Noble Field • Starkville, MS | L 9–12 | 23–14 | 6–12 |
| Apr 14 | UAB* | | Dudy Noble Field • Starkville, MS | W 10–1 | 24–14 | |
| Apr 15 | UAB* | | Dudy Noble Field • Starkville, MS | W 8–5 | 25–14 | |
| Apr 17 | at Auburn | | Plainsman Park • Auburn, AL | W 13–4 | 26–14 | 7–12 |
| Apr 18 | at Auburn | | Plainsman Park • Auburn, AL | W 8–0 | 27–14 | 8–12 |
| Apr 21 | at Southern Miss* | | Pete Taylor Park • Hattiesburg, MS | L 1–6 | 27–15 | |
| Apr 22 | at Southern Miss* | | Pete Taylor Park • Hattiesburg, MS | W 4–3 | 28–15 | |
| Apr 24 | Georgia | | Dudy Noble Field • Starkville, MS | W 5–4 | 29–15 | 9–12 |
| Apr 25 | Georgia | | Dudy Noble Field • Starkville, MS | W 9–5 | 30–15 | 10–12 |
| Apr 26 | Georgia | | Dudy Noble Field • Starkville, MS | W 7–1 | 31–15 | 11–12 |
| Apr 28 | Southern Miss* | No. 29 | Dudy Noble Field • Starkville, MS | W 11–0 | 32–15 | |

May
| Date | Opponent | Rank | Site/stadium | Score | Overall record | SEC record |
|---|---|---|---|---|---|---|
| May 1 | at No. 3 South Carolina | No. 29 | Sarge Frye Field • Columbia, SC | W 16–0 | 33–15 | 12–12 |
| May 2 | at No. 3 South Carolina | No. 29 | Sarge Frye Field • Columbia, SC | W 10–4 | 34–15 | 13–12 |
| May 3 | at No. 3 South Carolina | No. 29 | Sarge Frye Field • Columbia, SC | L 2–6 ^{(7)} | 34–16 | 13–13 |
| May 8 | Arkansas | No. 22 | Dudy Noble Field • Starkville, MS | L 10–14 ^{(10)} | 34–17 | 13–14 |
| May 9 | Arkansas | No. 22 | Dudy Noble Field • Starkville, MS | W 17–3 | 35–17 | 14–14 |
| May 10 | Arkansas | No. 22 | Dudy Noble Field • Starkville, MS | L 3–8 | 35–18 | 14–15 |

Postseason

SEC Tournament
| Date | Opponent | Rank (Seed) | Site/stadium | Score | Overall record | SECT record |
|---|---|---|---|---|---|---|
| May 13 | No. 6 (3) South Carolina | No. 28 (6) | Hoover Metropolitan Stadium • Hoover, AL | W 9–8 | 36–18 | 1–0 |
| May 14 | (7) Arkansas | No. 28 (6) | Hoover Metropolitan Stadium • Hoover, AL | L 3–10 | 36–19 | 1–1 |
| May 15 | No. 5 (2) LSU | No. 28 (6) | Hoover Metropolitan Stadium • Hoover, AL | W 7–5 | 37–19 | 2–1 |
| May 16 | (7) Arkansas | No. 28 (6) | Hoover Metropolitan Stadium • Hoover, AL | L 3–7 | 37–20 | 2–2 |

NCAA Central Regional
| Date | Opponent | Rank (Seed) | Site/stadium | Score | Overall record | Regional record |
|---|---|---|---|---|---|---|
| May 21 | No. 15 (3) Washington | (4) | Olsen Field • College Station, TX | W 7–6 | 38–20 | 1–0 |
| May 22 | No. 12 (2) Texas A&M | (4) | Olsen Field • College Station, TX | L 3–4 | 38–21 | 1–1 |
| May 23 | No. 7 (1) Rice | (4) | Olsen Field • College Station, TX | W 15–14 | 39–21 | 2–1 |
| May 23 | No. 12 (2) Texas A&M | (4) | Olsen Field • College Station, TX | W 10–9 | 40–21 | 3–1 |
| May 24 | No. 12 (2) Texas A&M | (4) | Olsen Field • College Station, TX | W 11–5 | 41–21 | 4–1 |

College World Series
| Date | Opponent | Rank (Seed) | Site/stadium | Score | Overall record | CWS record |
|---|---|---|---|---|---|---|
| May 30 | No. 2 (1) Florida | No. 8 (8) | Johnny Rosenblatt Stadium • Omaha, NE | W 14–13 | 42–21 | 1–0 |
| June 1 | No. 3 (5) LSU | No. 8 (8) | Johnny Rosenblatt Stadium • Omaha, NE | L 8–10 | 42–22 | 1–1 |
| June 2 | No. 4 (4) USC | No. 8 (8) | Johnny Rosenblatt Stadium • Omaha, NE | L 1–7 | 42–23 | 1–2 |

Rankings from Collegiate Baseball poll released weekly. Weekly polls only available beginning April 27. Tournament seeds in parentheses.

== Ranking movements ==
Ranking movements Legend: ██ Increase in ranking ██ Decrease in ranking — = Not ranked
| | Week | | | | | |
| Poll | 2 | 3 | 4 | 5 | 6 | Final |
|---|---|---|---|---|---|---|
| Coaches' | Not released | | | | | 14 |
| Baseball America | Not released | | | | | 14 |
| Collegiate Baseball | 29 | 22 | 28 | — | 8 | 6 |
