= 1998 LSU Tigers baseball team =

American college baseball season

1998 LSU Tigers baseball

NCAA South II Regional champions SEC West champions

College World Series, 2–2
- Conference: Southeastern Conference
- Record: 48–19 (21–9 SEC)
- Head coach: Skip Bertman (15th year)
- Home stadium: Alex Box Stadium

1998 Southeastern Conference baseball standings
	Conf.				Overall
Team	W		L	PCT	W		L	PCT
Eastern Division
No. 7 Florida ^{x}‍†‍‍^{y}	21	–	8	.724	46	–	18	.719
No. 19 South Carolina ‍‍‍^{y}	19	–	10	.655	42	–	16	.724
Kentucky ‍‍‍	12	–	18	.400	26	–	31	.456
Tennessee ‍‍‍	11	–	17	.393	36	–	20	.643
Georgia ‍‍‍	8	–	21	.276	24	–	30	.444
Vanderbilt ‍‍‍	6	–	24	.200	25	–	28	.472
Western Division
No. 3 LSU ^{x}‍‍‍^{y}	21	–	9	.700	48	–	19	.716
No. 16 Alabama ‍‍‍^{y}	19	–	10	.655	43	–	16	.729
No. 12 Auburn ‍‍‡‍^{y}	16	–	12	.571	46	–	18	.719
No. 6 Mississippi State ‍‍‍^{y}	14	–	15	.483	37	–	20	.649
Arkansas ‍‍‍^{y}	13	–	14	.481	37	–	19	.661
Ole Miss ‍‍‍	13	–	15	.464	30	–	23	.566
x – Division champion † – Conference champion ‡ – Tournament champion y – Invited to the NCAA tournament As of June 30, 1998; Rankings from Collegiate Baseball

The 1998 LSU Tigers baseball team represented Louisiana State University in the 1998 NCAA Division I baseball season. The Tigers played their home games at Alex Box Stadium, and played as part of the Southeastern Conference. The team was coached by Skip Bertman in his fifteenth season as head coach at LSU.

The Tigers won the SEC West and reached the College World Series, their tenth appearance in Omaha, where they finished 3rd after recording wins against eventual champion USC and Mississippi State and two losses to USC in the semifinals.

== Personnel ==
=== Roster ===
1998 LSU Tigers roster
Pitchers: 9 - Doug Thompson - Senior; 17 - Jason Albritton - Junior; 18 - Dan Guillory - Junior; 21 - Brian Tallet - Sophomore; 26 - Randy Keisler - Junior; 28 - Jake Esteves - Senior; 30 - Bryan Grace - Junior; 31 - Kurt Ainsworth - Freshman; 34 - Chris Demouy - Senior; 37 - Cody Hartshorn - Freshman; 38 - Tim Nugent - Freshman; 41 - Brandon Bowe - Junior; 42 - Shane Youman - Freshman; 43 - Billy Brian - Freshman; 44 - Weylin Guidry - Freshman; 51 - Matt Colvin - Sophomore	Catchers: 13 - Clint Earnhart - Junior; 22 - Brad Cresse - Sophomore; 47 - Jamin Garidel - Freshman; 50 - Courtney Hernandez - Freshman; Outfielders: 2 - Antoine Simon - Sophomore; 3 - Jeremy Witten - Sophomore; 10 - Danny Higgins - Senior; 20 - Wes Davis - Senior; 24 - Cedrick Harris - Freshman; 27 - Bryon Bennett - Junior; 46 - LaVar Johnson - Freshman	Infielders: 1 - Josh Dalton - Junior; 4 - Blair Barbier - Sophomore; 8 - Johnnie Thibodeaux - Sophomore; 14 - Trey McClure - Junior; 16 - Jeff Lipari - Freshman; 23 - Jeff Leaumont - Junior; 25 - Chucky Son - Freshman; 33 - Christian Bourgeois - Freshman; 35 - Tommy Morel - Freshman; 36 - Eddy Furniss - Senior; 48 - Mike Daly - Freshman

=== Coaches ===
1998 LSU Tigers baseball coaching staff
- Skip Bertman - Head coach - 15th Season
- Dan Canevari - Assistant coach
- Jim Schwanke - Assistant coach

== Schedule and results ==
Legend
LSU win
LSU loss

1998 LSU Tigers baseball game log
Regular season

February
Date	Opponent	Site/Stadium	Score	Overall Record	SEC Record
Feb 13	Southwestern Louisiana*	Alex Box Stadium • Baton Rouge, LA	W 11–7	1–0	
Feb 14	Southwestern Louisiana*	Alex Box Stadium • Baton Rouge, LA	W 15–0	2–0	
Feb 17	LSU–Shreveport*	Alex Box Stadium • Baton Rouge, LA	W 16–5	3–0	
Feb 18	Southwestern Louisiana*	Alex Box Stadium • Baton Rouge, LA	L 4–7	3–1	
Feb 20	at Texas*	Disch–Falk Field • Austin, TX	L 1–5	3–2	
Feb 21	at Texas*	Disch–Falk Field • Austin, TX	W 12–9	4–2	
Feb 22	at Texas*	Disch–Falk Field • Austin, TX	L 5–7^{8}	4–3	
Feb 24	Northeast Louisiana*	Alex Box Stadium • Baton Rouge, LA	W 9–8^{11}	5–3	
Feb 25	Louisiana College*	Alex Box Stadium • Baton Rouge, LA	W 7–2	6–3	
Feb 27	vs Mississippi State*	Louisiana Superdome • New Orleans, LA (Winn-Dixie Showdown)	L 3–11	6–4	
Feb 28	vs Arkansas*	Louisiana Superdome • New Orleans, LA (Winn-Dixie Showdown)	L 5–6^{10}	6–5	

March
Date	Opponent	Site/Stadium	Score	Overall Record	SEC Record
Mar 1	vs Southern Miss*	Louisiana Superdome • New Orleans, LA (Winn-Dixie Showdown)	W 16–4^{8}	7–5	
Mar 3	Tulane*	Alex Box Stadium • Baton Rouge, LA	W 10–9	8–5	
Mar 4	Southern*	Alex Box Stadium • Baton Rouge, LA	W 26–0	9–5	
Mar 6	Georgia	Alex Box Stadium • Baton Rouge, LA	W 4–1	10–5	1–0
Mar 7	Georgia	Alex Box Stadium • Baton Rouge, LA	W 14–1^{7}	11–5	2–0
Mar 8	Georgia	Alex Box Stadium • Baton Rouge, LA	W 14–9	12–5	3–0
Mar 10	Louisiana Tech*	Alex Box Stadium • Baton Rouge, LA	W 8–1	13–5	
Mar 11	McNeese State*	Alex Box Stadium • Baton Rouge, LA	W 4–3	14–5	
Mar 13	at Auburn	Plainsman Park • Auburn, AL	W 11–8^{12}	15–5	4–0
Mar 14	at Auburn	Plainsman Park • Auburn, AL	L 7–14	15–6	4–1
Mar 15	at Auburn	Plainsman Park • Auburn, AL	L 8–15	15–7	4–2
Mar 17	New Orleans*	Alex Box Stadium • Baton Rouge, LA	W 4–2	16–7	
Mar 18	Southeastern Louisiana*	Alex Box Stadium • Baton Rouge, LA	W 13–2	17–7	
Mar 20	Arkansas	Alex Box Stadium • Baton Rouge, LA	W 9–5	18–7	5–2
Mar 21	Arkansas	Alex Box Stadium • Baton Rouge, LA	W 6–3	19–7	6–2
Mar 22	Arkansas	Alex Box Stadium • Baton Rouge, LA	W 27–6^{7}	20–7	7–2
Mar 24	Northwestern State*	Alex Box Stadium • Baton Rouge, LA	W 6–3	21–7	
Mar 25	at McNeese State*	Joe Miller Ballpark • Lake Charles, LA	W 13–5	22–7	
Mar 27	at Kentucky	Cliff Hagan Stadium • Lexington, KY	W 7–3	23–7	8–2
Mar 28	at Kentucky	Cliff Hagan Stadium • Lexington, KY	W 7–2	24–7	9–2
Mar 29	at Kentucky	Cliff Hagan Stadium • Lexington, KY	W 11–6	25–7	10–2
Mar 31	Nicholls State*	Alex Box Stadium • Baton Rouge, LA	W 4–0	26–7	

April
Date	Opponent	Site/Stadium	Score	Overall Record	SEC Record
Apr 1	Nicholls State*	Alex Box Stadium • Baton Rouge, LA	W 9–2	27–7	
Apr 3	Mississippi State	Alex Box Stadium • Baton Rouge, LA	W 8–5	28–7	11–2
Apr 4	Mississippi State	Alex Box Stadium • Baton Rouge, LA	L 3–8	28–8	11–3
Apr 5	Mississippi State	Alex Box Stadium • Baton Rouge, LA	W 11–5	29–8	12–3
Apr 7	vs Tulane*	Zephyr Field • Metairie, LA	L 8–10	29–9	
Apr 10	at Vanderbilt	McGugin Field • Nashville, TN	W 5–3	30–9	13–3
Apr 11	at Vanderbilt	McGugin Field • Nashville, TN	W 6–4	31–9	14–3
Apr 12	at Vanderbilt	McGugin Field • Nashville, TN	L 7–8	31–10	14–4
Apr 14	Loyola New Orleans*	Alex Box Stadium • Baton Rouge, LA	W 9–5	32–10	
Apr 15	at Southeastern Louisiana*	Alumni Field • Hammond, LA	W 9–3	33–10	
Apr 17	Alabama	Alex Box Stadium • Baton Rouge, LA	W 6–5	34–10	15–4
Apr 19	Alabama	Alex Box Stadium • Baton Rouge, LA	W 7–3^{7}	35–10	16–4
Apr 19	Alabama	Alex Box Stadium • Baton Rouge, LA	L 2–4^{7}	35–11	16–5
Apr 22	vs New Orleans*	Zephyr Field • Metairie, LA	W 9–5	36–11	
Apr 24	at Florida	Alfred A. McKethan Stadium • Gainesville, FL	W 13–5	37–11	17–5
Apr 25	at Florida	Alfred A. McKethan Stadium • Gainesville, FL	L 3–4	37–12	17–6
Apr 26	at Florida	Alfred A. McKethan Stadium • Gainesville, FL	L 1–3	37–13	17–7

May
Date	Opponent	Rank	Site/Stadium	Score	Overall Record	SEC Record
May 1	Tennessee	No. 5	Alex Box Stadium • Baton Rouge, LA	W 4–3	38–13	18–7
May 2	Tennessee	No. 5	Alex Box Stadium • Baton Rouge, LA	W 15–12	39–13	19–7
May 3	Tennessee	No. 5	Alex Box Stadium • Baton Rouge, LA	W 8–7	40–13	20–7
May 8	at Ole Miss	No. 3	Swayze Field • Oxford, MS	W 11–4	41–13	21–7
May 9	at Ole Miss	No. 3	Swayze Field • Oxford, MS	L 0–9	41–14	21–8
May 10	at Ole Miss	No. 3	Swayze Field • Oxford, MS	L 8–10	41–15	21–9

Postseason

SEC Tournament
Date	Opponent	Rank (Seed)	Site/Stadium	Score	Overall Record	SECT Record
May 13	(7) Arkansas	No. 5 (2)	Hoover Metropolitan Stadium • Hoover, AL	L 4–8	41–16	0–1
May 14	No. 6 (3) South Carolina	No. 5 (2)	Hoover Metropolitan Stadium • Hoover, AL	W 6–0	42–16	1–1
May 15	No. 28 (6) Mississippi State	No. 5 (2)	Hoover Metropolitan Stadium • Hoover, AL	L 5–7	42–17	1–2

NCAA South II Regional
Date	Opponent	Rank (Seed)	Site/Stadium	Score	Overall Record	Reg Record
May 21	(6) Nicholls State	No. 5 (1)	Alex Box Stadium • Baton Rouge, LA	W 18–4	43–17	1–0
May 22	(4) Southwestern Louisiana	No. 5 (1)	Alex Box Stadium • Baton Rouge, LA	W 15–6	44–17	2–0
May 23	No. 8 (2) Cal State Fullerton	No. 5 (1)	Alex Box Stadium • Baton Rouge, LA	W 13–11	45–17	3–0
May 24	No. 8 (2) Cal State Fullerton	No. 5 (1)	Alex Box Stadium • Baton Rouge, LA	W 14–3	46–17	4–0

College World Series
Date	Opponent	Rank (Seed)	Site/Stadium	Score	Overall Record	CWS Record
May 30	No. 4 (4) USC	No. 3 (5)	Johnny Rosenblatt Stadium • Omaha, NE	W 12–10	47–17	1–0
June 1	No. 8 (8) Mississippi State	No. 3 (5)	Johnny Rosenblatt Stadium • Omaha, NE	W 10–8	48–17	2–0
June 4	No. 4 (4) USC	No. 3 (5)	Johnny Rosenblatt Stadium • Omaha, NE	L 4–5	48–18	2–1
June 5	No. 4 (4) USC	No. 3 (5)	Johnny Rosenblatt Stadium • Omaha, NE	L 3–7	48–19	2–2

Rankings from Collegiate Baseball poll. Only Rankings from April 28 onward are currently available. Tournament seeds in parentheses.
