= 1998 ACC tournament =

1998 ACC tournament may refer to:

- 1998 ACC men's basketball tournament
- 1998 ACC women's basketball tournament
- 1998 ACC men's soccer tournament
- 1998 ACC women's soccer tournament
- 1998 Atlantic Coast Conference baseball tournament
- 1998 Atlantic Coast Conference softball tournament
