= 1998 Colonial Athletic Association baseball tournament =

American college baseball tournament

- Teams: 8
- Format: Double-elimination tournament
- Finals site: Grainger Stadium; Kinston, North Carolina
- Champions: Richmond (3rd title)
- Winning coach: Ron Atkins (3rd title)
- MVP: Mike Dwyer (Richmond)

1998 Colonial Athletic Association baseball standings
	Conf.						Overall
Team	W		L		T	PCT	W		L		T	PCT
No. 26 VCU ‍†‍‍^{y}	18	–	2	–	0	.900	46	–	15	–	0	.754
Richmond ‍‍‡‍^{y}	15	–	6	–	0	.714	41	–	17	–	1	.703
James Madison ‍‍‍	11	–	8	–	0	.579	27	–	29	–	0	.482
East Carolina ‍‍‍	10	–	11	–	0	.476	30	–	29	–	0	.508
Old Dominion ‍‍‍	9	–	12	–	0	.429	28	–	29	–	0	.491
George Mason ‍‍‍	8	–	12	–	0	.400	26	–	28	–	0	.481
UNC Wilmington ‍‍‍	6	–	14	–	0	.300	21	–	34	–	0	.382
William & Mary ‍‍‍	4	–	16	–	0	.200	24	–	28	–	0	.462
† – Conference champion ‡ – Tournament champion y – Invited to the NCAA tournament As of June 30, 1998; Rankings from Collegiate Baseball

The 1998 Colonial Athletic Association baseball tournament was held at Grainger Stadium in Kinston, North Carolina, from May 12 through 15. The event determined the champion of the Colonial Athletic Association for the 1998 season. Second-seeded Richmond won the tournament for the third time, and second consecutive year, and earned the CAA's automatic bid to the 1998 NCAA Division I baseball tournament.

Entering the event, East Carolina had won the most championships, with five. Old Dominion had won three, while George Mason and Richmond had each won twice.

== Format and seeding ==
The CAA's teams were seeded one to eight based on winning percentage from the conference's round robin regular season. They played a double-elimination tournament.

Team	W	L	Pct.	GB	Seed
VCU	18	2	.900	—	1
Richmond	15	6	.714	3.5	2
James Madison	11	8	.579	6.5	3
East Carolina	10	11	.476	8.5	4
Old Dominion	9	12	.429	9.5	5
George Mason	8	12	.400	10	6
UNC Wilmington	6	14	.300	12	7
William & Mary	4	16	.200	14	8

== Bracket and results ==
Upper round 1	Upper round 2	Upper final	Final
1	VCU	7
8	William & Mary	4
1	VCU	5
4	East Carolina	2
4	East Carolina	6
5	Old Dominion	2
1	VCU	4
2	Richmond	8
3	James Madison	2
6	George Mason	1
3	James Madison	1
2	Richmond	6
2	Richmond	5
7	UNC Wilmington	2	2	Richmond	12	—
5	Old Dominion	1	—
Lower round 1	Lower round 2	Lower round 3	Lower final
3	James Madison	1
8	William & Mary	5	5	Old Dominion	6	1	VCU	6
5	Old Dominion	10	5	Old Dominion	1	5	Old Dominion	7
6	George Mason	0
4	East Carolina	1
6	George Mason	5	6	George Mason	4
7	UNC Wilmington	0

== Most Valuable Player ==
Mike Dwyer was named Tournament Most Valuable Player. Dwyer was a first baseman and pitcher for Richmond.
