= 1998 Southeastern Conference baseball tournament =

- Teams: 8
- Format: Two pools of four-team double elimination
- Finals site: Hoover Metropolitan Stadium; Hoover, Alabama
- Champions: Auburn (3rd title)
- Winning coach: Hal Baird (2nd title)
- MVP: Rodney Nye (Arkansas)
- Attendance: 87,295

1998 Southeastern Conference baseball standings
	Conf.				Overall
Team	W		L	PCT	W		L	PCT
Eastern Division
No. 7 Florida ^{x}‍†‍‍^{y}	21	–	8	.724	46	–	18	.719
No. 19 South Carolina ‍‍‍^{y}	19	–	10	.655	42	–	16	.724
Kentucky ‍‍‍	12	–	18	.400	26	–	31	.456
Tennessee ‍‍‍	11	–	17	.393	36	–	20	.643
Georgia ‍‍‍	8	–	21	.276	24	–	30	.444
Vanderbilt ‍‍‍	6	–	24	.200	25	–	28	.472
Western Division
No. 3 LSU ^{x}‍‍‍^{y}	21	–	9	.700	48	–	19	.716
No. 16 Alabama ‍‍‍^{y}	19	–	10	.655	43	–	16	.729
No. 12 Auburn ‍‍‡‍^{y}	16	–	12	.571	46	–	18	.719
No. 6 Mississippi State ‍‍‍^{y}	14	–	15	.483	37	–	20	.649
Arkansas ‍‍‍^{y}	13	–	14	.481	37	–	19	.661
Ole Miss ‍‍‍	13	–	15	.464	30	–	23	.566
x – Division champion † – Conference champion ‡ – Tournament champion y – Invited to the NCAA tournament As of June 30, 1998; Rankings from Collegiate Baseball

The 1998 Southeastern Conference baseball tournament was held at Hoover Metropolitan Stadium in Hoover, Alabama from May 13 through 17. Auburn defeated Arkansas in the championship game, earning the Southeastern Conference's automatic bid to the 1998 NCAA Division I baseball tournament.

== Regular season results ==
The top four teams (based on conference results) from both the Eastern and Western Divisions earned invites to the tournament. The 12 teams played a 30-game conference schedule, playing 10 three-game series. Each team did not play one team from the opposite division.

For the first time, the SEC tournament used the Omaha format, which was first adopted at the College World Series in 1988. The eight teams were seeded and divided into two four-team brackets; seeds 2, 3, 6 and 7 made up bracket one and seeds 1, 4, 5 and 8 made up bracket two. Bracket play was double elimination. The two bracket winners met in a single championship game.

== Tournament ==
First round
6	Mississippi State	9
3	South Carolina	8
7	Arkansas	8
2	LSU	4
3	South Carolina	0
2	LSU	6
5	Auburn	11
4	Alabama	8
8	Kentucky	4
1	Florida	6
5	Alabama	8
8	Kentucky	3

Second round
6	Mississippi State	3
7	Arkansas	10
6	Mississippi State	7
2	LSU	5
5	Auburn
1	Florida	4
1	Florida	2
4	Alabama	3

Semifinals
7	Arkansas	7	-
6	Mississippi State	3	-
5	Auburn	3	9
4	Alabama	4	1

Final
7	Arkansas	5
5	Auburn	7

- Georgia, Ole Miss, Tennessee, and Vanderbilt did not make the tournament.

== All-Tournament Team ==
Most Valuable Player Rodney Nye, Arkansas

Position	Player	School
1B	Rodney Nye	Arkansas
2B	Heath Kelly	Auburn
3B	Chad Wandall	Auburn
SS	Joe Jester	Arkansas
C	Brent Caldwell	Arkansas
OF	Hayden Gliemmo	Auburn
OF	Drew Bounds	Alabama
OF	Jack Welsh	Arkansas
DH	Jayson Cox	Alabama
P	Randy Keisler	Louisiana State
P	Jarrod Kingrey	Alabama
MVP	Rodney Nye	Arkansas

== See also ==
- College World Series
- NCAA Division I Baseball Championship
- Southeastern Conference baseball tournament
