= 1998 Conference USA baseball tournament =

- Teams: 10
- Format: Play-in round followed by eight-team double-elimination tournament
- Finals site: Zephyr Field; New Orleans, Louisiana
- Champions: Tulane (2nd title)
- Winning coach: Rick Jones (2nd title)
- MVP: Brian Hughes (Tulane)

1998 Conference USA baseball standings
| | Conf. | | | | Overall |
| Team | W | | L | PCT | W | | L | PCT |
|---|---|---|---|---|---|---|---|---|
| No. 25 Tulane ‍†‍‡‍^{y} | 22 | – | 5 | .815 | 48 | – | 15 | .762 |
| Houston ‍‍‍ | 21 | – | 6 | .778 | 34 | – | 25 | .576 |
| UNC Charlotte ‍‍‍^{y} | 19 | – | 8 | .704 | 43 | – | 19 | .694 |
| UAB ‍‍‍ | 15 | – | 12 | .556 | 29 | – | 24 | .547 |
| Louisville ‍‍‍ | 14 | – | 13 | .519 | 31 | – | 24 | .564 |
| Southern Miss ‍‍‍ | 12 | – | 15 | .444 | 30 | – | 28 | .517 |
| Memphis ‍‍‍ | 12 | – | 15 | .444 | 10 | – | 24 | .294 |
| South Florida ‍‍‍ | 9 | – | 18 | .333 | 21 | – | 36 | .368 |
| Saint Louis ‍‍‍ | 4 | – | 20 | .167 | 10 | – | 38 | .208 |
| Cincinnati ‍‍‍ | 4 | – | 20 | .167 | 15 | – | 38 | .283 |
† – Conference champion ‡ – Tournament champion y – Invited to the NCAA tournament As of June 30, 1998; Rankings from Collegiate Baseball

The 1998 Conference USA baseball tournament was the 1998 postseason baseball championship of the NCAA Division I Conference USA, held at Zephyr Field in New Orleans, Louisiana, from May 12 through 17. Tulane defeated UNC Charlotte in the championship game, earning the conference's automatic bid to the 1998 NCAA Division I baseball tournament.

== Regular season results ==
| Team | W | L | PCT | GB | Seed |
|---|---|---|---|---|---|
| Tulane | 22 | 5 | .815 | - | 1 |
| Houston | 21 | 6 | .778 | 1 | 2 |
| UNC Charlotte | 19 | 8 | .704 | 3 | 3 |
| UAB | 15 | 12 | .556 | 7 | 4 |
| Louisville | 14 | 13 | .519 | 8 | 5 |
| Southern Miss | 12 | 15 | .444 | 10 | 6 |
| Memphis | 12 | 15 | .444 | 10 | 7 |
| South Florida | 9 | 18 | .333 | 13 | 8 |
| Saint Louis | 4 | 20 | .167 | 16.5 | 9 |
| Cincinnati | 4 | 20 | .167 | 16.5 | 10 |

- Records reflect conference play only.

== Bracket ==
=== Play-in games ===
Two play-in games among the four teams with the worst regular season records decided which two teams would have the final two spots in the eight-team double-elimination bracket.

| Play-in game |
| **9** | **Saint Louis** | **7** |
| 8 | South Florida | 6 |

| Play-in game |
| 10 | Cincinnati | 5 |
| **7** | **Memphis** | **6** |

=== Double-elimination ===
First round
**5** | **Louisville** | **9**
4 | UAB | 8
9 | Saint Louis | 3
**1** | **Tulane** | **7**
9 | Saint Louis | 1
**4** | **UAB** | **4**
7 | Memphis | 2
**2** | **Houston** | **3**
6 | Southern Miss | 3
**3** | **UNC Charlotte** | **13**
7 | Memphis | 6
**6** | **Southern Miss** | **7**

Second round
5 | Louisville | 2
**1** | **Tulane** | **13**
**5** | **Louisville** | **11**
4 | UAB | 6
**3** | **Charlotte** | **6**
2 | Houston | 5
**6** | **Southern Miss** | **6**
2 | Houston | 5

Semifinals
5 | Louisville | 3
**1** | **Tulane** | **6**
6 | Southern Miss | 5
**3** | **Charlotte** | **6**

Final
3 | Charlotte | 3
**1** | **Tulane** | **5**

- **Bold** indicates the winner of the game.
- Italics indicate that the team was eliminated from the tournament.

== All-tournament team ==
| Position | Player | School |
|---|---|---|
| C | James McAuley | Louisville |
| IF | Jeremy Schied | Southern Miss |
| IF | Keith Graffagnini | Tulane |
| IF | Gerald Parr | Charlotte |
| IF | Bo Robinson | Charlotte |
| OF | Brandon Caraway | Houston |
| OF | Eric Lee | Houston |
| OF | Brian Hughes | Tulane |
| DH | Rob Partin | Louisville |
| P | Craig Brown | Tulane |
| RP | Brion Treadway | Charlotte |
| **MVP** | Brian Hughes | Tulane |
