= 1998 Florida Gators baseball team =

American college baseball season

1998 Florida Gators baseball

SEC regular season champions South I Regional champions

College World Series, 0–2
- Conference: Southeastern Conference

Ranking
- Coaches: No. 7
- CB: No. 7
- Record: 46–18 (21–8 SEC)
- Head coach: Andy Lopez (4th year)
- Assistant coach: Gary Henderson; Steve Kling; Eric Ekdahl
- Home stadium: Alfred A. McKethan Stadium

1998 Southeastern Conference baseball standings
	Conf.				Overall
Team	W		L	PCT	W		L	PCT
Eastern Division
No. 7 Florida ^{x}‍†‍‍^{y}	21	–	8	.724	46	–	18	.719
No. 19 South Carolina ‍‍‍^{y}	19	–	10	.655	42	–	16	.724
Kentucky ‍‍‍	12	–	18	.400	26	–	31	.456
Tennessee ‍‍‍	11	–	17	.393	36	–	20	.643
Georgia ‍‍‍	8	–	21	.276	24	–	30	.444
Vanderbilt ‍‍‍	6	–	24	.200	25	–	28	.472
Western Division
No. 3 LSU ^{x}‍‍‍^{y}	21	–	9	.700	48	–	19	.716
No. 16 Alabama ‍‍‍^{y}	19	–	10	.655	43	–	16	.729
No. 12 Auburn ‍‍‡‍^{y}	16	–	12	.571	46	–	18	.719
No. 6 Mississippi State ‍‍‍^{y}	14	–	15	.483	37	–	20	.649
Arkansas ‍‍‍^{y}	13	–	14	.481	37	–	19	.661
Ole Miss ‍‍‍	13	–	15	.464	30	–	23	.566
x – Division champion † – Conference champion ‡ – Tournament champion y – Invited to the NCAA tournament As of June 30, 1998; Rankings from Collegiate Baseball

The 1998 Florida Gators baseball team represented the University of Florida in the sport of baseball during the 1998 college baseball season. The Gators competed in Division I of the National Collegiate Athletic Association (NCAA) and the Eastern Division of the Southeastern Conference (SEC). They played their home games at Alfred A. McKethan Stadium, on the university's Gainesville, Florida campus. The team was coached by Andy Lopez, who was in his fourth season at Florida.

== Roster ==
1998 Florida Gators baseball team
Players
Coaches

#	Pos.	Name	B/T	Height	Weight	Year	Home town
27	RHP	Tommy Bond	R/R	6 ft 4 in (1.93 m)	200 lb (91 kg)	Sr	Ocala, FL
45	RHP	Keith Brice	R/R	6 ft 1 in (1.85 m)	190 lb (86 kg)	Fr	Miami, FL
6	INF	Josh Canales	R/R	6 ft 0 in (1.83 m)	170 lb (77 kg)	Fr	Los Angeles, CA
41	RHP	Jeffrey Cardozo	R/R	6 ft 4 in (1.93 m)	192 lb (87 kg)	Fr	Hobe Sound, FL
28	OF	Greg Catalanotte	S/R	6 ft 3 in (1.91 m)	210 lb (95 kg)	Jr	Glendale, AZ
49	RHP	Kevin Coleman	R/R	6 ft 1 in (1.85 m)	185 lb (84 kg)	Fr	Marietta, GA
30	INF	Jason Dill	L/L	6 ft 1 in (1.85 m)	205 lb (93 kg)	Fr	Punta Gorda, FL
23	OF	Dwight Edge	R/R	6 ft 6 in (1.98 m)	235 lb (107 kg)	So	Apopka, FL
2	INF	Mark Ellis	R/R	5 ft 11 in (1.8 m)	180 lb (82 kg)	Jr	Rapid City, SD
47	OF	Mike Floyd	R/R	6 ft 2 in (1.88 m)	210 lb (95 kg)	So	Brandon, FL
22	RHP	Josh Fogg	R/R	6 ft 1 in (1.85 m)	205 lb (93 kg)	Jr	Margate, FL
44	LHP	Ryan Gleichowski	L/L	5 ft 10 in (1.78 m)	165 lb (75 kg)	Fr	Clearwater, FL
17	RHP	Michael Gray	R/R	6 ft 2 in (1.88 m)	200 lb (91 kg)	Sr	Fernandina Beach, FL
46	RHP	Ben Grezlovski	R/R	5 ft 11 in (1.8 m)	175 lb (79 kg)	Jr	Pinecrest, FL
37	OF	Brian Haught	R/R	5 ft 10 in (1.78 m)	185 lb (84 kg)	Jr	Tampa, FL
24	INF	Chuck Hazzard	R/R	6 ft 4 in (1.93 m)	220 lb (100 kg)	Sr	Dallas, TX
38	OF	Dan Heard	R/R	5 ft 9 in (1.75 m)	170 lb (77 kg)	Fr	Orange Park, FL
31	C	Matt Heath	S/R	6 ft 1 in (1.85 m)	190 lb (86 kg)	Fr	Fernandina Beach, FL
40	C	Todd Johannes	R/R	6 ft 3 in (1.91 m)	183 lb (83 kg)	Jr	Miami, FL
3	INF	Tim Johnson	R/R	6 ft 0 in (1.83 m)	195 lb (88 kg)	Fr	Coventry, CT
50	RHP	Kevin Keen	R/R	6 ft 5 in (1.96 m)	225 lb (102 kg)	Fr	Wauchula, FL
5	INF	Ty Martin	S/R	6 ft 2 in (1.88 m)	180 lb (82 kg)	So	Melbourne, FL
34	RHP	Matt McClendon	R/R	6 ft 6 in (1.98 m)	225 lb (102 kg)	So	Orlando, FL
42	LHP	Stuart McFarland	L/L	6 ft 4 in (1.93 m)	210 lb (95 kg)	Fr	Arden Hills, MN
39	INF	Pete McKinney	R/R	5 ft 11 in (1.8 m)	185 lb (84 kg)	Jr	Melbourne, FL
13	C	Dan Mooney	R/R	6 ft 2 in (1.88 m)	200 lb (91 kg)	Jr	Forked River, NJ
11	OF	Derek Nicholson	S/R	6 ft 0 in (1.83 m)	205 lb (93 kg)	Sr	Torrance, CA
10	INF	Alan Rhine	R/R	6 ft 0 in (1.83 m)	180 lb (82 kg)	So	Sebring, FL
9	INF	Banks Robinson	L/R	5 ft 11 in (1.8 m)	185 lb (84 kg)	Fr	Jacksonville, FL
25	LHP	Sergio Rodriguez	L/L	6 ft 0 in (1.83 m)	185 lb (84 kg)	Jr	Miami, FL
29	RHP	Tommy Rose	R/R	5 ft 11 in (1.8 m)	185 lb (84 kg)	Jr	St. Cloud, FL
21	C	David Ross	R/R	6 ft 2 in (1.88 m)	205 lb (93 kg)	Jr	Tallahassee, FL
32	OF	Shane Seroyer	R/R	6 ft 0 in (1.83 m)	183 lb (83 kg)	Jr	Neptune Beach, FL
35	INF	Matt Siegel	L/R	5 ft 10 in (1.78 m)	170 lb (77 kg)	Fr	Tampa, FL
15	C	Casey Smith	R/R	5 ft 10 in (1.78 m)	197 lb (89 kg)	Sr	Dallas, TX
36	RHP	Randy Sterling	R/R	6 ft 3 in (1.91 m)	188 lb (85 kg)	Fr	Key West, FL
18	RHP	K.O. Wiegandt	R/R	6 ft 1 in (1.85 m)	190 lb (86 kg)	So	Miami, FL
12	OF	Brad Wilkerson	L/L	6 ft 0 in (1.83 m)	193 lb (88 kg)	Jr	Owensboro, KY
4	OF	Spencer Williams	L/R	5 ft 6 in (1.68 m)	166 lb (75 kg)	Fr	Lansdale, PA
16	INF	Taylor Wood	R/R	6 ft 0 in (1.83 m)	170 lb (77 kg)	Fr	Fernandina Beach, FL

Head coach

Andy Lopez

Assistant coach(es)

Gary Henderson
Steve Kling
Eric Ekdahl

Legend

- (C) Team captain
- (S) Suspended
- (I) Ineligible
- Injured
- Current redshirt

Roster

== See also ==
- Florida Gators
- List of Florida Gators baseball players
