= Pat McMahon =

Pat, Paddy or Patrick McMahon or MacMahon or Mac Mahon may refer to:

- Pat McMahon (actor) (born 1935), American television actor and broadcaster
- Pat McMahon (athlete) (born 1942), Irish long-distance runner
- Pat McMahon (baseball) (born 1953), former head baseball coach of the Mississippi State Bulldogs and the Florida Gators
- Pat McMahon (footballer, born 1908) (1908–1992), Scottish football goalkeeper
- Pat McMahon (footballer, born 1945), Scottish football player
- Pat McMahon (politician) (d. 2008), Canadian politician
- Pat McMahon (soccer, born 1986), American soccer player
- Pat McMahon (rugby league) (born 1927), Australian professional rugby league footballer
- Paddy McMahon (equestrian) (1933–2021), show jumper
- Paddy McMahon (hurler), Irish hurler
- Patrick MacMahon (bishop) (died c. 1572 or c. 1575), 16th-century bishop of Ardagh in Ireland
- Patrick McMahon, film editor of Teeny Little Super Guy
- Patrick McMahon (MP) (1813–1875), British Member of Parliament for New Ross and County Wexford
- Patrick J. McMahon or P. J. McMahon (1888–1939), American politician from Nebraska

== See also ==
- Patrice de MacMahon, Duke of Magenta (1808–1893), French general and politician
