= 1998 Mid-Continent Conference baseball tournament =

- Teams: 6
- Format: Double-elimination
- Finals site: J. L. Johnson Stadium; Tulsa, Oklahoma
- Champions: Oral Roberts (1st title)
- Winning coach: Sunny Golloway (1st title)
- MVP: Paul Weeks (Oral Roberts)

1998 Mid-Continent Conference baseball standings
	Conf.				Overall
Team	W		L	PCT	W		L	PCT
East
C.W. Post ^{x}‍‍‍	12	–	2	.857	21	–	21	.500
Youngstown State ‍‍‍	5	–	6	.455	17	–	31	.354
Central Connecticut ‍‍‍	6	–	8	.429	24	–	22	.522
Pace ‍‍‍	5	–	7	.417	14	–	26	.350
NYIT ‍‍‍	5	–	10	.333	13	–	28	.317
West
Oral Roberts ^{x}‍‍‡‍^{y}	18	–	6	.750	45	–	20	.692
Valparaiso ‍‍‍	13	–	9	.591	31	–	23	.574
Western Illinois ‍‍‍	12	–	10	.545	15	–	28	.349
Chicago State ‍‍‍	9	–	14	.391	19	–	21	.475
Northeastern Illinois ‍‍‍	5	–	19	.208	10	–	33	.233
‡ – Tournament champion y – Invited to the NCAA tournament As of June 30, 1998; Rankings from Collegiate Baseball

The 1998 Mid-Continent Conference Tournament took place from May 7 through 10. The top three regular season finishers of each of the league's two divisions met in the double-elimination tournament held at J. L. Johnson Stadium on the campus of Oral Roberts University in Tulsa, Oklahoma. New member Oral Roberts won the tournament for the first time.

== Format and seeding ==
The top three teams from each division advanced to the tournament.

East Division
Team	W	L	Pct.	GB	Seed
C.W. Post	12	2	.857	—	1E
Youngstown State	5	6	.455	5.5	2E
Central Connecticut	6	8	.429	6	3E
Pace	5	7	.417	6	—
NYIT	5	10	.333	7.5	—

West Division
Team	W	L	Pct.	GB	Seed
Oral Roberts	18	6	.750	—	1W
Valparaiso	13	9	.591	4	2W
Western Illinois	12	10	.545	5	3W
Chicago State	9	14	.391	8.5	—
Northeastern Illinois	5	19	.208	13	—

== Tournament ==
First round
1W	Oral Roberts	5
3E	Central Connecticut	3
2W	Valparaiso	12
2E	Youngstown State	3
1E	C.W. Post	11
3W	Western Illinois	12

Second round
1W	Oral Roberts	12
1E	C.W. Post	5
2W	Valparaiso	6
3W	Western Illinois	4
3E	Central Connecticut	3
2E	Youngstown State	0

Third round
1W	Oral Roberts	7
2W	Valparaiso	4
3W	Western Illinois	14
3E	Central Connecticut	2

Semifinals
2W	Valparaiso	9
3W	Western Illinois	3

Final
1W	Oral Roberts	12
2W	Valparaiso	10

=== Game-by-game results ===
Game	Winner	Score	Loser	Comment
1	(1W) Oral Roberts	5–3	(3E) Central Connecticut	
2	(2W) Valparaiso	12–3	(2E) Youngstown State	
3	(3W) Western Illinois	12–11	(1E) C.W. Post	
4	(3E) Central Connecticut	3–0	(2E) Youngstown State	Youngstown State eliminated
5	(1W) Oral Roberts	12–5	(1E) C.W. Post	C.W Post eliminated
6	(2W) Valparaiso	6–4	(3W) Western Illinois	
7	(3W) Western Illinois	14–2	(3E) Central Connecticut	Central Connecticut eliminated
8	(1W) Oral Roberts	7–4	(2W) Valparaiso	
9	(2W) Valparaiso	9–3	(3W) Western Illinois	Western Illinois eliminated
10	(1W) Oral Roberts	12–10	(2W) Valparaiso	Oral Roberts wins Mid-Con Championship

== All-Tournament Team ==
Name	School
Derek Dixon	Oral Roberts
Bryan Gann	Oral Roberts
Mike Hill	Oral Roberts
Scott Martin	Central Connecticut State
Andrew Mosher	Oral Roberts
Ryan Poepard	Valparaiso
Anthony Rogers	Western Illinois
J.J Swiatkowski	Valparaiso
Eric Vandeventer	Oral Roberts
Paul Weeks	Oral Roberts
Tom Wigand	C.W. Post
Justin Wohlers	Western Illinois

=== Tournament Most Valuable Player ===
Paul Weeks of Oral Roberts was named Tournament MVP.
