= 1998 Trans America Athletic Conference baseball tournament =

American college baseball tournament

- Teams: 6
- Format: Double-elimination
- Finals site: Osceola County Stadium; Kissimmee, Florida
- Champions: FIU (2nd title)
- Winning coach: Danny Price (2nd title)
- MVP: Edwin Franco (FIU)

1998 Trans America Athletic Conference baseball standings
	Conf.						Overall
Team	W		L		T	PCT	W		L		T	PCT
South
FIU ^{x}‍†‍‡‍^{y}	15	–	5	–	0	.750	41	–	24	–	0	.631
UCF ‍‍‍	14	–	7	–	0	.667	41	–	21	–	0	.661
Stetson ‍‍‍	9	–	12	–	0	.429	30	–	31	–	1	.492
Florida Atlantic ‍‍‍	6	–	14	–	0	.300	29	–	30	–	0	.492
East
Georgia State ^{x}‍‍‍	11	–	9	–	0	.550	23	–	29	–	0	.442
College of Charleston ‍‍‍	10	–	11	–	0	.476	31	–	26	–	0	.544
Campbell ‍‍‍	10	–	11	–	0	.476	28	–	30	–	0	.483
Mercer ‍‍‍	7	–	13	–	0	.350	27	–	26	–	1	.509
West
Troy State ^{x}‍‍‍	13	–	7	–	0	.650	37	–	21	–	0	.638
Jacksonville State ‍‍‍	13	–	8	–	0	.619	34	–	20	–	0	.630
Centenary ‍‍‍	9	–	12	–	0	.429	21	–	36	–	0	.368
Samford ‍‍‍	6	–	14	–	0	.300	13	–	43	–	0	.232
x – Division champion † – Conference champion ‡ – Tournament champion y – Invited to the NCAA tournament As of June 30, 1998; Rankings from Collegiate Baseball

The 1998 Trans America Athletic Conference baseball tournament was held at Osceola County Stadium in Kissimmee, Florida. This was the twentieth tournament championship held by the Trans America Athletic Conference. FIU won their second tournament championship and earned the conference's automatic bid to the 1998 NCAA Division I baseball tournament.

== Format and seeding ==
The top six finishers by overall winning percentage qualified for the tournament, with the top seed playing the lowest seed in the first round. College of Charleston was ineligible as it completed its transition from NAIA.

Team	W	L	T	Pct.	Seed
South
FIU	36	22	0	.621	1
UCF	39	19	0	.672	3
Stetson	29	29	1	.500	5
Florida Atlantic	29	28	0	.509	6

Team	W	L	T	Pct.	Seed
East
Georgia State	23	29	0	.442	—
College of Charleston	31	26	0	.544	—
Campbell	28	30	0	.483	—
Mercer	27	26	1	.509	—

Team	W	L	T	Pct.	Seed
West
Troy State	34	19	0	.642	2
Jacksonville State	34	18	0	.654	4
Centenary	21	36	0	.368	—
Samford	13	43	0	.232	—

== Bracket ==
First round
1	FIU	9
6	Florida Atlantic	8
3	UCF	5
4	Jacksonville State	0
2	Troy State	4
5	Stetson	5^{10}

Second round
1	FIU	3
4	Jacksonville State	1
3	UCF	5
5	Stetson	3
2	Troy State	11
6	Florida Atlantic	6

Third round
1	FIU	3
3	UCF	2
5	Stetson	3
2	Troy State	8

Semifinals
3	UCF	9
2	Troy State	12

Final
1	FIU	9	—
2	Troy State	4	—

== All-Tournament Team ==
The following players were named to the All-Tournament Team.

POS	Player	School
P	Edwin Franco	FIU
P	Trey Wright	Troy
C	Jeff Rodriguez	FIU
IF	Fred Case	Troy
IF	Jason Vetter	FIU
IF	Dustin Brisson	UCF
IF	Tim Boeth	UCF
OF	Ned French	Stetson
OF	Ricky Rowe	Troy
OF	Sean Mahoney	FIU
OF	Jim Molina	FIU
DH	Jorge Soto	Troy

=== Most Valuable Player ===
Edwin Franco was named Tournament Most Valuable Player. Franco was a pitcher for FIU.
