= 1998 Big South Conference baseball tournament =

- Teams: 4
- Format: Double-elimination
- Finals site: Knights Stadium; Fort Mill, South Carolina
- Champions: Liberty (2nd title)
- Winning coach: Dave Pastors (1st title)
- MVP: David Dalton (Liberty)

1998 Big South Conference baseball standings
	Conf.				Overall
Team	W		L	PCT	W		L	PCT
Liberty ‍†‍‡‍^{y}	13	–	5	.722	32	–	29	.525
Coastal Carolina ‍‍‍	11	–	7	.611	31	–	29	.517
UNC Asheville ‍‍‍	10	–	8	.556	27	–	32	.458
Winthrop ‍‍‍	10	–	8	.556	35	–	22	.614
Charleston Southern ‍‍‍	9	–	9	.500	24	–	29	.453
Radford ‍‍‍	7	–	11	.389	17	–	35	.327
UMBC ‍‍‍	3	–	15	.167	10	–	37	.213
† – Conference champion ‡ – Tournament champion y – Invited to the NCAA tournament As of June 30, 1998; Rankings from Collegiate Baseball

The 1998 Big South Conference baseball tournament was the postseason baseball tournament for the Big South Conference, held from May 8 through 10 at Knights Stadium in Fort Mill, South Carolina. The top four finishers from the regular season participated in the double-elimination tournament. The champion, Liberty, won the title for the second time and earned an invitation to the 1998 NCAA Division I baseball tournament.

== Format ==
The top four finishers from the regular season qualified for the tournament. The teams were seeded one through four and played a double-elimination tournament.

Team	W	L	Pct.	GB	Seed
Liberty	13	5	.722	—	1
Coastal Carolina	11	7	.611	2	2
UNC Asheville	10	8	.556	3	3
Winthrop	10	8	.556	3	4
Charleston Southern	9	9	.500	4	—
Radford	7	11	.389	6	—
UMBC	3	15	.167	10	—

== Bracket and results ==
First round
1	Liberty	8
4	Winthrop	5
3	UNC Asheville	4
2	Coastal Carolina	10
Lower round 1
4	Winthrop	4
3	UNC Asheville	5

Semi-finals
1	Liberty	9
2	Coastal Carolina	6
Lower final
2	Coastal Carolina	5
3	UNC Asheville	2

Finals
1	Liberty
2	Coastal Carolina

== All-Tournament Team ==
Name	School
Bryan Byler	Liberty
Dorian Cameron	Coastal Carolina
Darryl Craig	Winthrop
David Dalton	Liberty
John Humay	Coastal Carolina
Rhett Johnson	Coastal Carolina
Phil Kojack	Liberty
Benji Miller	Liberty
Jeremy Samatas	Coastal Carolina
Kevin Schnall	Coastal Carolina
Troy Stortz	UNC Asheville
Shawn Vinju	Coastal Carolina
Steve Wright	Liberty

=== Most Valuable Player ===
David Dalton was named Tournament Most Valuable Player. Dalton was a shortstop for Liberty.
