= Gold Mine on Airline =

Stadium in Metairie, Louisiana, U.S.

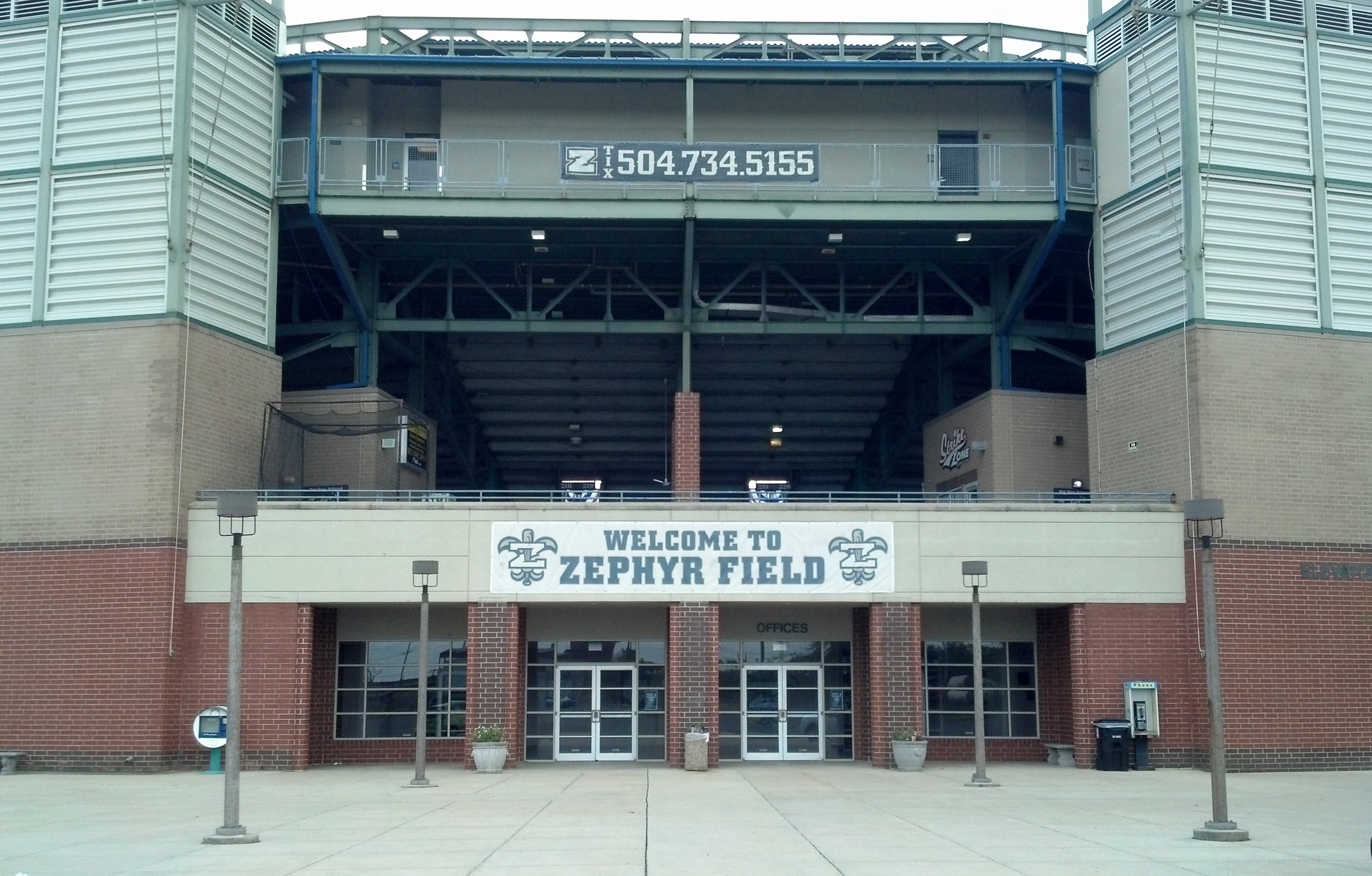

- Location within Louisiana Location within the United States
- Interactive map of Gold Mine on Airline
- Former names: Shrine on Airline (2017–2020); Zephyr Field (1997–2016)
- Address: 6000 Airline Drive; Metairie, Louisiana, 70003
- Coordinates: 29°58′31.59″N 90°11′59.07″W
- Owner: State of Louisiana
- Capacity: 10,000
- Surface: Grass
- Field size: Left Field: 330 ft (100 m); Center Field: 400 ft (120 m); Right Field: 330 ft (100 m)

Construction
- Groundbreaking: November 30, 1995
- Opened: April 11, 1997
- Cost: US$26 million ($52.1 million in 2025 dollars)
- Architects: Populous (then HOK Sport); Perez Apc; ARCHITECTS PLUS (2006 Hurricane Katrina Restorations)
- Project manager: The Tobler Company
- Structural engineer: Kulkarni Consultants
- General contractors: Joseph Caldarera & Company

Tenants
- New Orleans Zephyrs/Baby Cakes (AA/PCL) 1997–2019; New Orleans Storm (USISL) 1998–1999; Tulane Green Wave (NCAA) 2006–2007; New Orleans Gold (MLR) 2020–2025

Gold Mine on Airline, formerly Shrine on Airline, is a 10,000-seat stadium in Metairie, Louisiana, United States, a suburb of New Orleans. It was home field for New Orleans Baby Cakes of Minor League Baseball, and the New Orleans Gold team in Major League Rugby during both teams existence. Known as Zephyr Field when built in 1997 as the home ballpark for the New Orleans Zephyrs (later New Orleans Baby Cakes), the stadium was renamed when the Minor League Baseball team's name changed from Zephyrs to Baby Cakes in 2017. Shrine on Airline had been an unofficial name for Zephyr Field used by the public address announcer since the stadium opened and it became the new name.

Minor league baseball left New Orleans at the end of the 2019 season, when the Baby Cakes relocated to Wichita, Kansas, where they continue as the Wichita Wind Surge. Initially, the city of New Orleans hoped to bring a Double-A Southern League team to the city and continue operations as the Baby Cakes. However, due to Major League Baseball's reorganization of Minor League Baseball, the league ceased operations in 2021 and the campaign ultimately failed. With the departure of the Baby Cakes, the stadium was repurposed with a rectangular field for football of all codes, with a more thorough renovation scheduled for late 2024.

The facility hosted the 1998 and 2001 Conference USA baseball tournaments and the 1999 Sun Belt Conference baseball tournament. Shrine on Airline was also the site of the Class 5A Louisiana High School Athletic Association (LHSAA) baseball tournament in 2004 and 2005.

== History ==
Zephyr Field hosted its first regular season baseball game on April 11, 1997, in which tenants New Orleans Zephyrs (later the New Orleans Baby Cakes), defeated the Oklahoma City 89ers 8–3.

The stadium also hosted select games of the Tulane University Green Wave baseball program. The team plays annual games at the ballpark against cross-town rival, the University of New Orleans Privateers, and arch-rival, Louisiana State University Tigers, at the ballpark. During the 2006 and 2007 baseball seasons, Zephyr Field was the primary home of the Green Wave, as Tulane's on-campus facility, Greer Field at Turchin Stadium, was undergoing renovations. The renovations were scheduled to be completed in time for the 2006 season, but Hurricane Katrina significantly damaged Turchin Stadium, forcing a delay in the project. In the hurricane's aftermath, Zephyr Field was utilized by the Louisiana Army National Guard and the Federal Emergency Management Agency as a rescue facility. In 2006, the state of Louisiana approved $21 million to recover Zephyr Field from the effects of Katrina. Additional funds from the bill covered recovery costs for the New Orleans Saints' training facility, located behind the ballpark, and the New Orleans Arena.

The stadium hosted the 1999 Triple-A All-Star Game in which the Pacific Coast League All-Stars defeated the International League All-Stars, 9–5. New Orleans' Daryle Ward was selected as the PCL MVP.

On July 3, 2003, the largest crowd in Shrine on Airline history for a Zephyrs game, 11,925, watches the Zephyrs lose 1–0 to the Nashville Sounds.

The Wally Pontiff Jr. Classic college baseball game was held annually at the Shrine on Airline beginning in 2004. The LSU Tigers baseball team played an opponent in the game to honor the former Metairie resident, LSU Baseball player and Oakland A's draftee, Wally Pontiff Jr., who died at the age of 21 from a genetic heart disorder. In 2004, LSU won the first game of the series vs. Southeastern Louisiana, 9–3. The last Classic played at Zephyr Field was played in April 2019, and saw the Ragin Cajuns of Louisiana defeat LSU 6–5. In 2022 it was announced that the 2022 game (to be played in Baton Rouge, and again against Louisiana), will be the final game for the Classic.

The ballpark is featured in several scenes in the 2004 movie Mr. 3000, and one from the 2006 movie called Failure to Launch. Also, part of an episode of Spike TV's Pros vs. Joes was also filmed at the ballpark.

A new playing surface was installed prior to the 2008 season. Its new dimensions are 330 feet (100 m) from home plate to left and right fields, and 400 feet (120 m) to center. The ballpark traditionally has allowed some of the fewest home runs in the Pacific Coast League. The ballpark's grass berm seating area, "the Levee", is located beyond center field and is the highest point in Metairie.

As a soccer venue, Shrine on Airline served as home of the New Orleans Storm soccer team in the late 1990s and hosted the semifinals of the 1998 Lamar Hunt U.S. Open Cup.

== Ballpark attractions ==
Concessions at Shrine on Airline feature traditional ballpark fare as well as several regional offerings, such as fried catfish, muffulettas, po' boy sandwiches, jambalaya, and pigskin nachos.

The New Orleans Zephyrs added an extra $5 million to the 2006 state-funded recovery bill for additional amenities, including 16 luxury suites, a swimming pool, two hot tubs, the Coors Light Party Shack, and the Metairie Bank Home Run Porch.

== Gallery ==
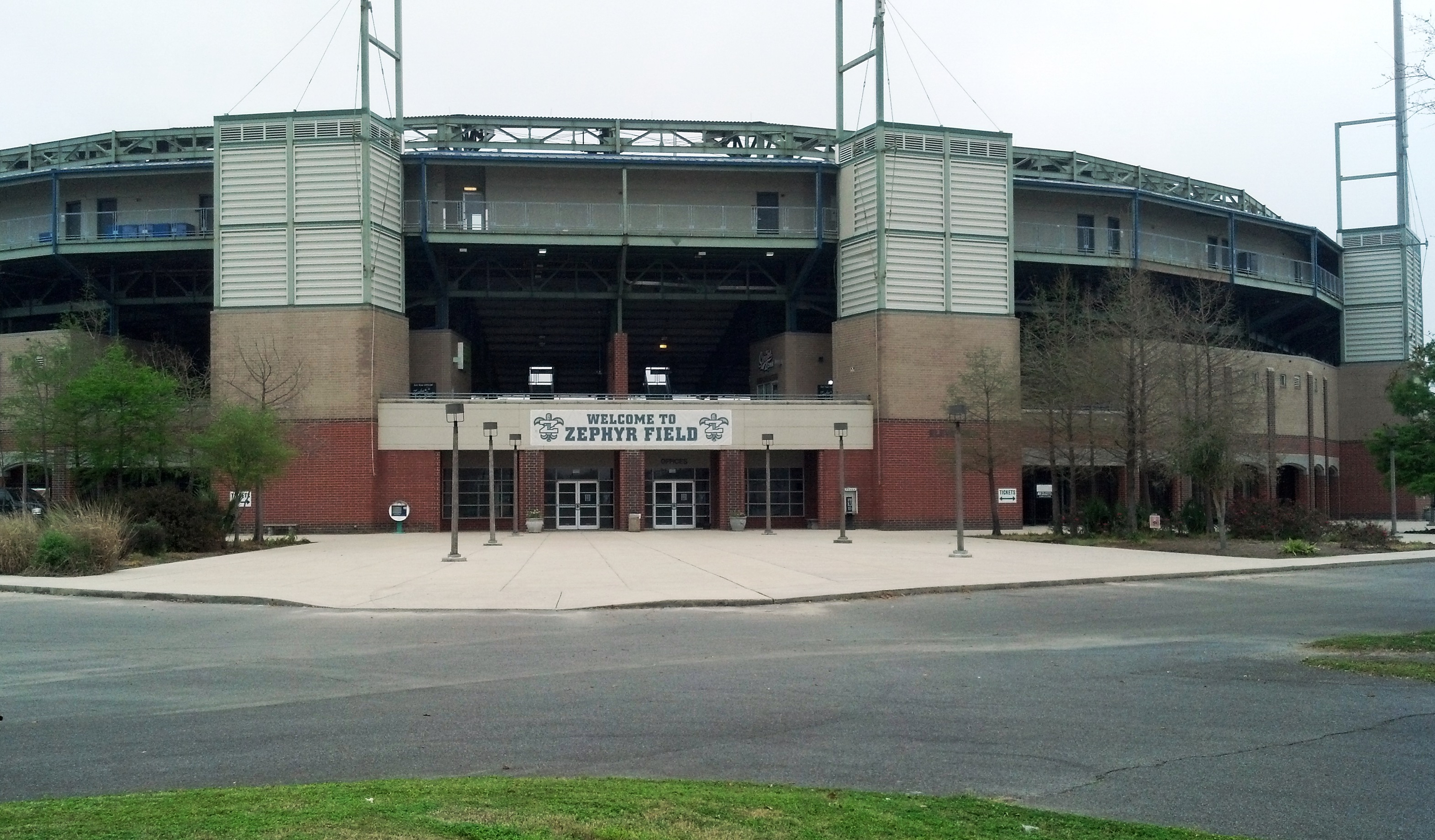
Main Entrance

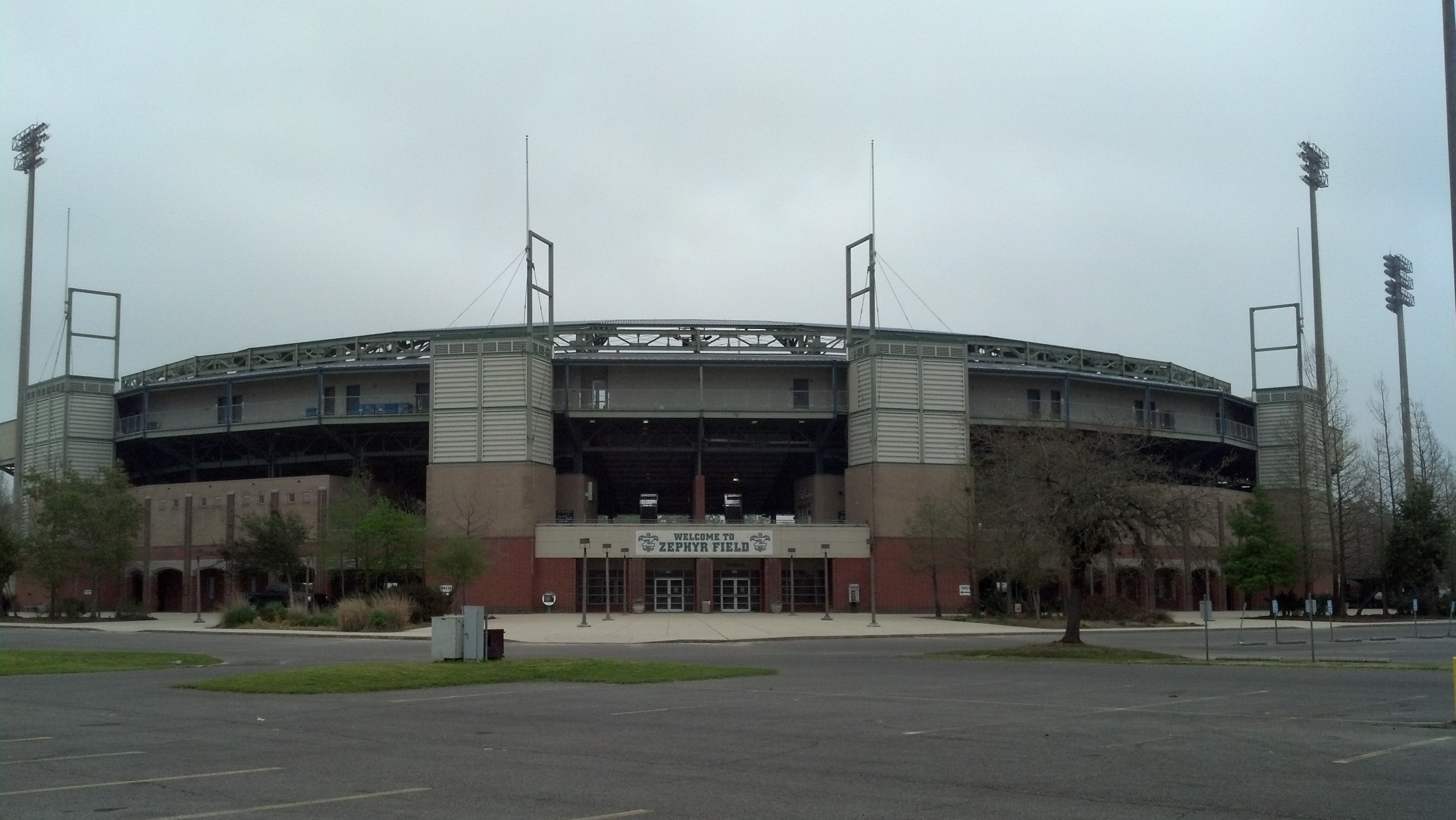
Shrine on Airline

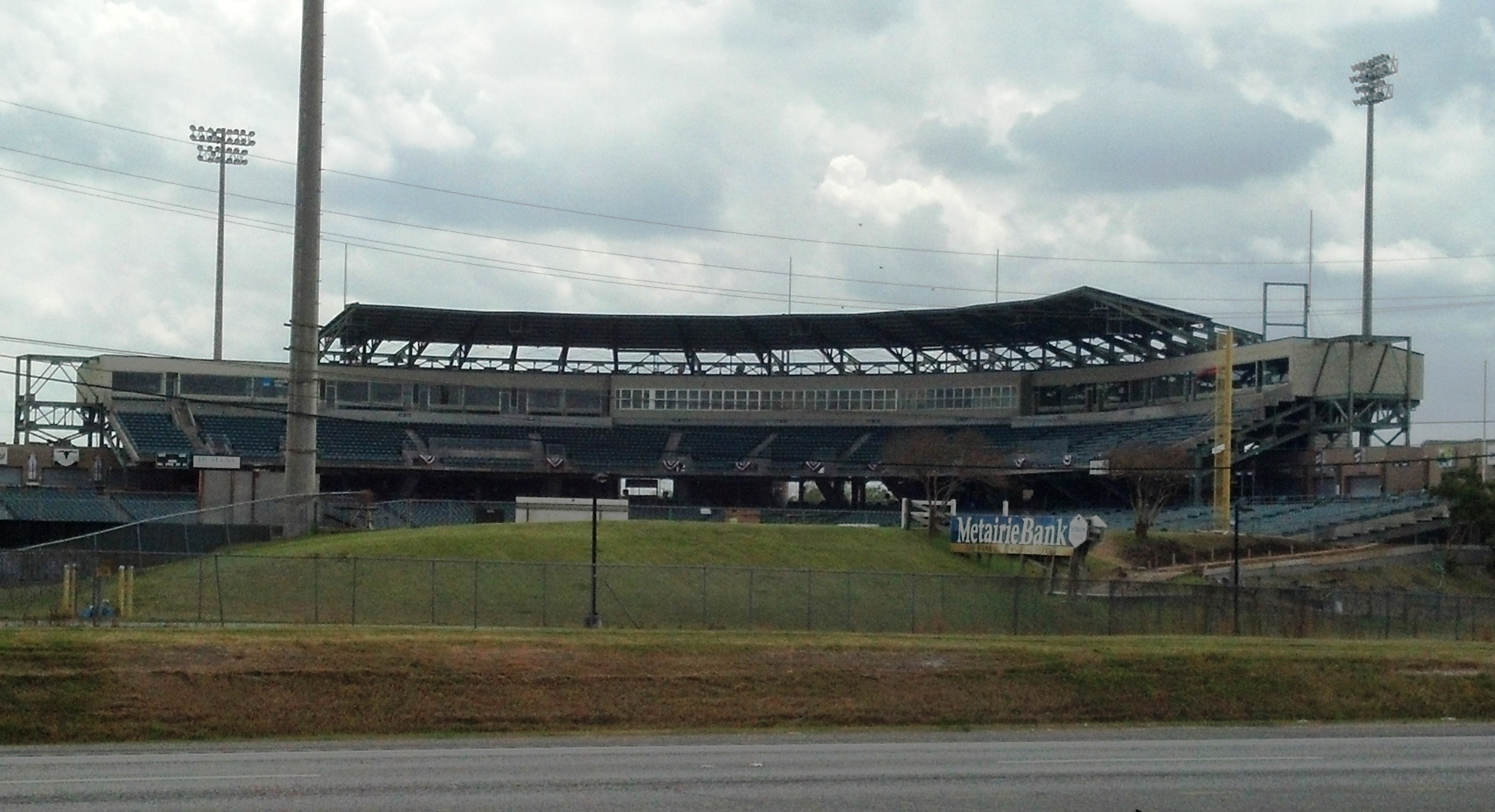
Grandstand, Left field

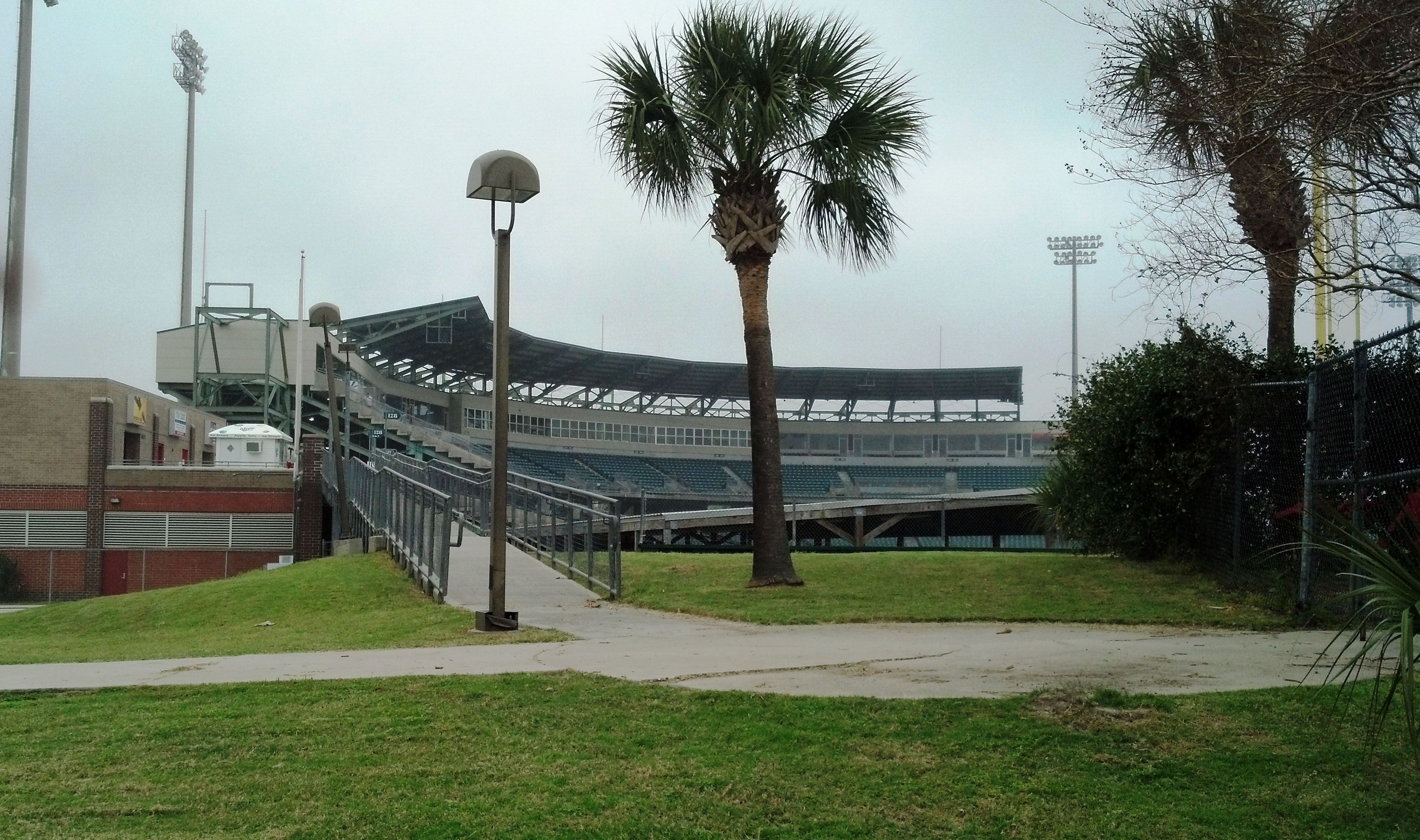
Grandstand, Right field

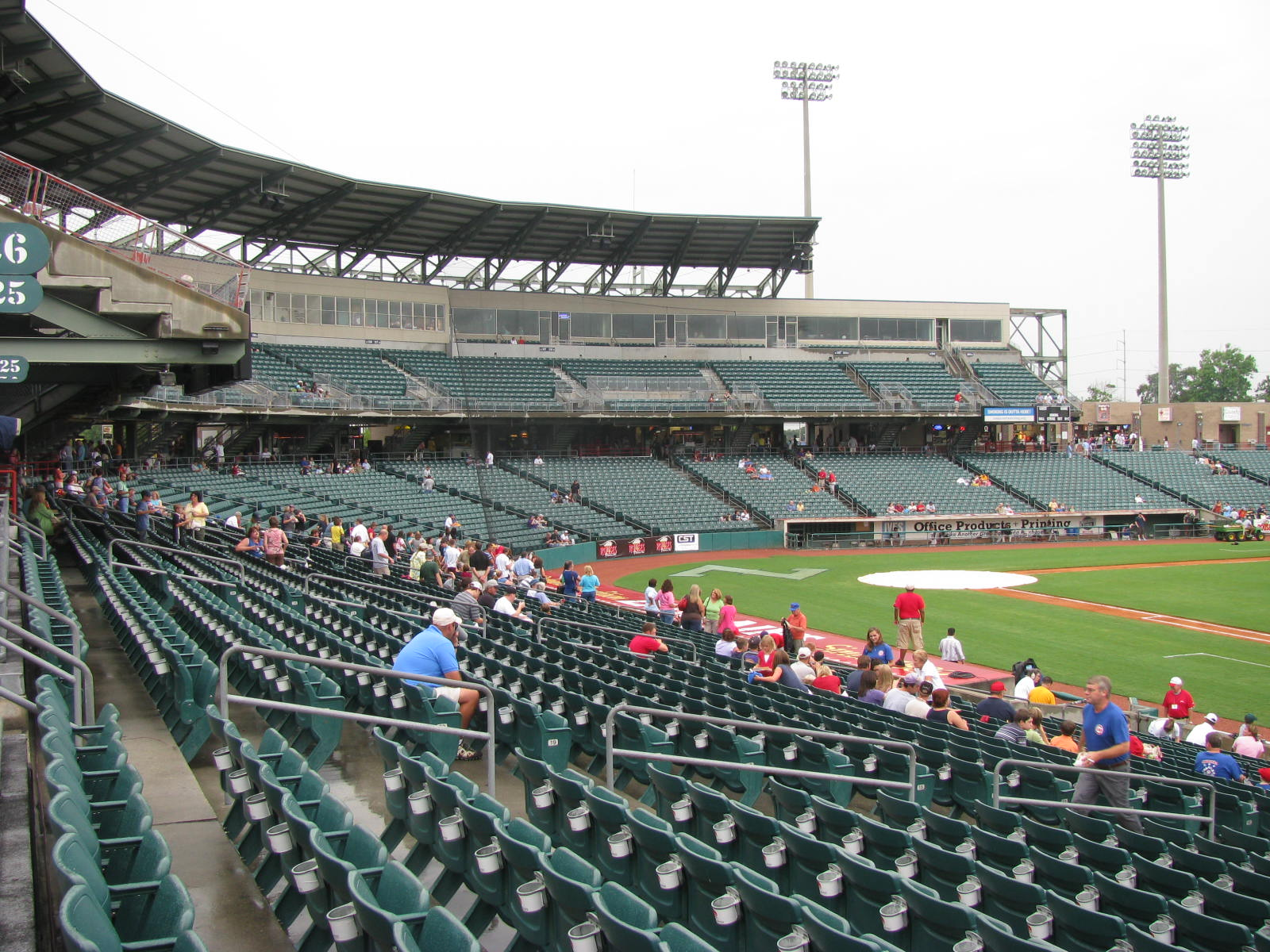
Grandstand

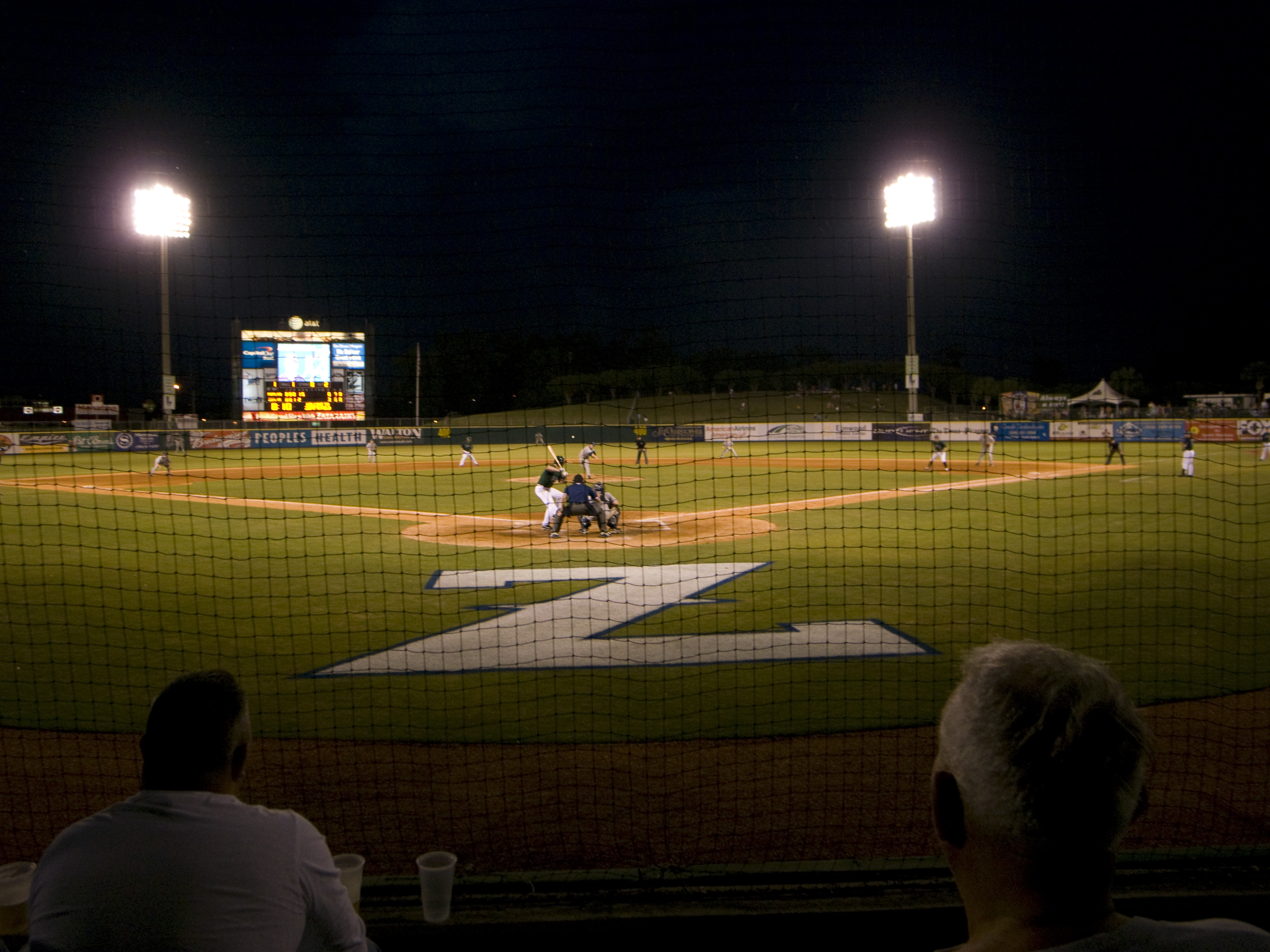
View behind home plate

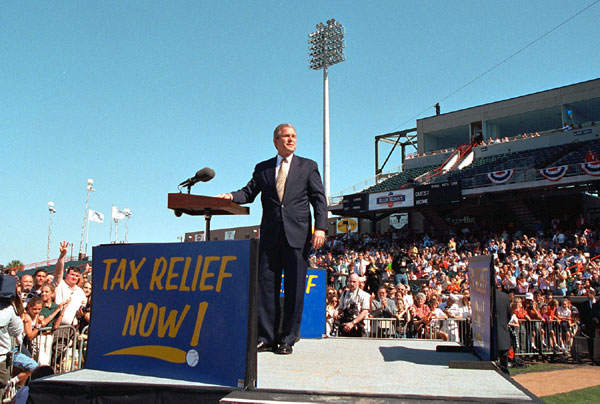
Then-U.S. President George W. Bush speaking at the Shrine on Airline (then Zephyr Field) in 2001

== See also ==
- Baseball in New Orleans
- List of NCAA Division I baseball venues
- List of music venues

Events and tenants
Preceded by Privateer Park	Home of the New Orleans Baby Cakes; 1997 – 2019	Succeeded by Riverfront Stadium (as Wichita Wind Surge)
Preceded by Joe Zimmerman Stadium	Home of the New Orleans Gold; 2020 – present	Succeeded by current
