= 2007 College Baseball All-America Team =

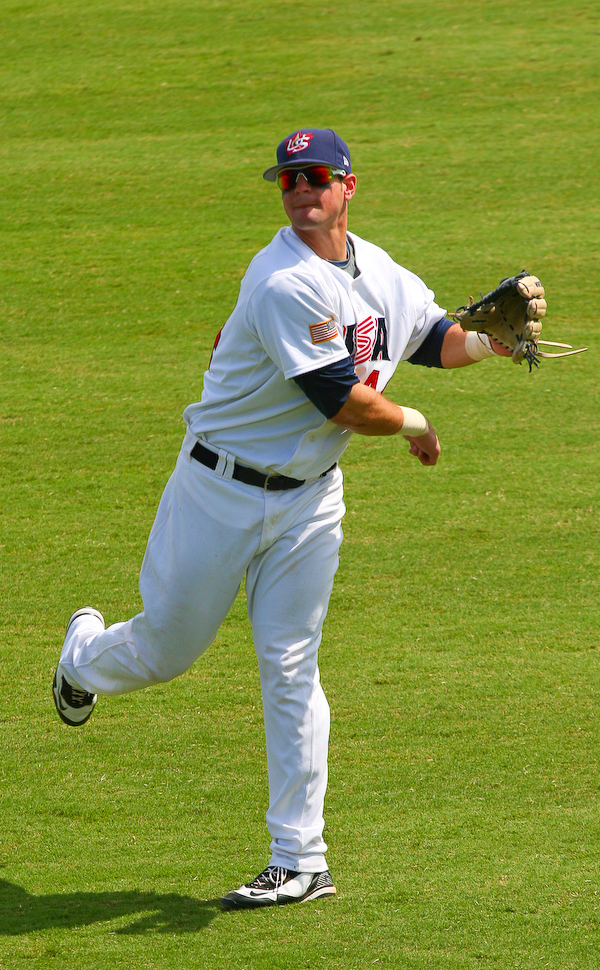
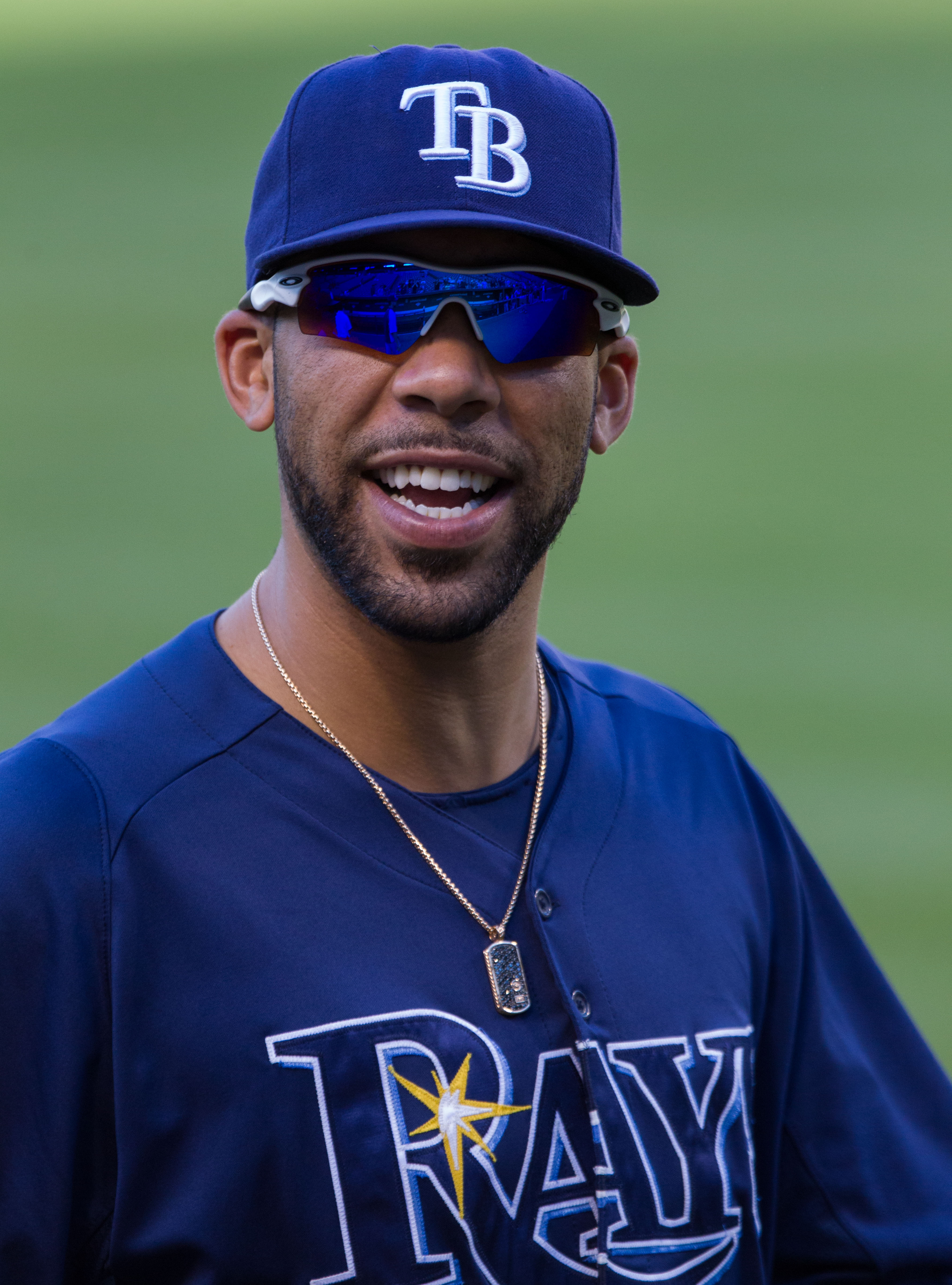
2007 All-Americans included 2008 Olympics Bronze Medalist Matt LaPorta (left) and 2× All-Star David Price (right).

This is a list of college baseball players named first team All-Americans for the 2007 NCAA Division I baseball season. From 2006 to 2010, there were five generally recognized All-America selectors for baseball: the American Baseball Coaches Association, Baseball America, Collegiate Baseball Newspaper, the National Collegiate Baseball Writers Association, and Rivals.com. In order to be considered a "consensus" All-American, a player must have been selected by at least three of these.

== Key ==
A	American Baseball Coaches Association
B	Baseball America
C	Collegiate Baseball Newspaper
N	National Collegiate Baseball Writers Association
R	Rivals.com
	Member of the National College Baseball Hall of Fame
	Consensus All-American – selected by all five organizations
	Consensus All-American – selected by three or four organizations

== All-Americans ==
Position	Name	School	#	A	B	C	N	R	Other awards and honors
Starting pitcher	Preston Guilmet	Arizona	2	—	✓	✓	—	—	
Starting pitcher	Bryan Henry	Florida State	2	✓	—	✓	—	—	
Starting pitcher	Brian Matusz	San Diego	1	—	—	—	✓	—	
Starting pitcher	Adam Mills	Charlotte	5	✓	✓	✓	✓	✓	
Starting pitcher	David Price	Vanderbilt	5	✓	✓	✓	✓	✓	Dick Howser Trophy Golden Spikes Award ABCA Player of the Year Baseball America Player of the Year Collegiate Baseball Player of the Year Brooks Wallace Award Roger Clemens Award First overall pick in the 2007 MLB draft
Starting pitcher	Anthony Shawler	Old Dominion	1	—	—	✓	—	—	
Starting pitcher	James Simmons	UC Riverside	1	—	—	—	—	✓	
Starting pitcher	Jacob Thompson	Virginia	5	✓	✓	✓	✓	✓	
Relief pitcher	Andrew Carignan	North Carolina	2	—	—	—	✓	✓	
Relief pitcher	Luke Prihoda	Sam Houston State	1	—	—	—	✓	—	Stopper of the Year
Relief pitcher	Casey Weathers	Vanderbilt	4	✓	✓	✓	—	✓	
Catcher	Sean Coughlin	Kentucky	1	—	—	—	✓	—	
Catcher	Ed Easley	Mississippi State	1	✓	—	—	—	—	Johnny Bench Award
Catcher	Buster Posey	Florida State	1	—	—	✓	—	—	
Catcher	Matt Wieters	Georgia Tech	2	—	✓	—	—	✓	
First baseman	Brett Wallace	Arizona State	4	—	✓	✓	✓	✓	
Second baseman	Tony Thomas	Florida State	5	✓	✓	✓	✓	✓	Collegiate Baseball Player of the Year
Shortstop	Todd Frazier	Rutgers	5	✓	✓	✓	✓	✓	
Third baseman	Pedro Alvarez	Vanderbilt	3	—	✓	—	✓	✓	
Third baseman	Brandon Waring	Wofford	2	✓	—	✓	—	—	
Outfielder	Dominic de la Osa	Vanderbilt	3	✓	—	✓	—	✓	
Outfielder	Grant Desme	Cal Poly	1	—	✓	—	—	—	
Outfielder	Kellen Kulbacki	James Madison	3	—	✓	—	✓	✓	
Outfielder	Kyle Russell	Texas	5	✓	✓	✓	✓	✓	
Outfielder	Robbie Widlansky	Florida Atlantic	3	✓	—	✓	✓	—	
Designated hitter	Steven Hill	Stephen F. Austin	1	—	—	✓	—	—	
Designated hitter / 1B	Matt LaPorta	Florida	3	✓	✓	—	—	✓	
Designated hitter	Kiel Roling	Arizona State	1	✓	—	—	—	—	
Designated hitter	Blake Stouffer	Texas A&M	1	—	—	—	—	✓	
Designated hitter	Bobby Verbick	Sam Houston State	1	—	—	—	✓	—	
Utility player	Joe Savery	Rice	5	✓	✓	✓	✓	✓	

== See also ==
- List of college baseball awards
