= 2007 NCAA Division I baseball rankings =

2007 NCAA Division I baseball season
- Duration: January 25-June 24, 2007
- Number of teams: 293
- Preseason No. 1: Rice

Tournament
- Duration: June 1–June 24, 2007
- Most conference bids: ACC (7)

College World Series
- Duration: June 15–June 24, 2007
- Champions: Oregon State (2nd title)
- Runners-up: North Carolina
- MOP: Jorge Reyes

Seasons
- ← 2006 2008 →

The following polls make up the 2007 NCAA Division I baseball rankings. USA Today and ESPN began publishing the Coaches' Poll of 31 active coaches ranking the top 25 teams in the nation in 1992. Each coach is a member of the American Baseball Coaches Association. Baseball America began publishing its poll of the top 20 teams in college baseball in 1981. Beginning with the 1985 season, it expanded to the top 25. Collegiate Baseball Newspaper published its first human poll of the top 20 teams in college baseball in 1957, and expanded to rank the top 30 teams in 1961.

== Legend ==
	Increase in ranking
	Decrease in ranking
	Not ranked previous week
Italics	Number of first place votes
(#-#)	Win–loss record
т	Tied with team above or below also with this symbol

== USA Today/ESPN Coaches' Poll ==
	Preseason Jan 22	Week 5 Mar 5	Week 6 Mar 12	Week 7 Mar 19	Week 8 Mar 26	Week 9 Apr 2	Week 10 Apr 9	Week 11 Apr 16	Week 12 Apr 23	Week 13 Apr 30	Week 14 May 7	Week 15 May 14	Week 16 May 21	Week 17 May 28	Final Jun 25	
1.	Rice (22)	Vanderbilt (14-0)	Vanderbilt (18-0)	Vanderbilt (21-1)	Florida State (26-1)	Vanderbilt (26-4)	Vanderbilt (29-5)	Vanderbilt (32-6)	Vanderbilt (35-8)	Vanderbilt (39-8)	Vanderbilt (41-9)	Vanderbilt (43-10)	Vanderbilt (46-10)	Vanderbilt (51-11)	Oregon State (49-18)	1.
2.	Clemson (4)	South Carolina (10-1)	North Carolina (15-1)	Florida State (23-0)	Oregon State (22-3)	Florida State (29-2)	Florida State (31-4)	Florida State (35-4)	Florida State (37-6)	Rice (37-11)	Florida State (42-7)	Rice (41-11)	Rice (45-11)	Rice (49-12)	North Carolina (57-16)	2.
3.	Miami (FL)	North Carolina (11-1)	Florida State (20-0)	South Carolina (17-3)	South Carolina (21-4)	Virginia (27-5)	North Carolina (29-5)	North Carolina (32-6)	Rice (33-11)	Florida State (39-7)	Rice (37-11)	North Carolina (41-11)	North Carolina (45-11)	North Carolina (48-12)	Rice (56-14)	3.
4.	South Carolina	Florida State (17-0)	South Carolina (13-2)	Oregon State (20-3)	Vanderbilt (23-3)	South Carolina (23-6)	South Carolina (26-7)	Texas (31-10)	Texas (33-12)	Texas (37-12)	Virginia (38-10)	Florida State (43-9)	Florida State (46-9)	Texas (44-15)	UC Irvine (47-17)	4.
5.	North Carolina	Virginia (14-1)	Oregon State (17-3)	Virginia (19-4)	North Carolina (22-4)	North Carolina (25-5)	Rice (26-10)	South Carolina (28-8)	South Carolina (31-10)	North Carolina (37-10) т	North Carolina (37-10)	Texas (39-14)	Texas (42-14)	Florida State (47-11)	Arizona State (49-15)	5.
6.	Texas (1)	Cal State Fullerton (12-5)	Clemson (10-4)	North Carolina (18-3)	Virginia (22-5)	Texas (25-9)	Texas (28-10)	Rice (29-11)	North Carolina (33-9)	Virginia (37-10) т	Texas (38-14)	Virginia (39-12)	Arizona State (41-12)	Arizona State (43-13)	Louisville (47-24)	6.
7.	Arkansas	Clemson (7-3)	Virginia (16-3)	Clemson (14-4)	Texas (22-8)	Arkansas (22-8)	Virginia (29-7)	Virginia (31-8)	Virginia (34-9)	Arkansas (35-12)	South Carolina (35-14)	Arizona State (37-12)	South Carolina (40-16)	Virginia (43-14)	Cal State Fullerton (38-25)	7.
8.	Cal State Fullerton	Oregon State (13-3)	Rice (14-7)	Rice (17-7)	Arkansas (19-7)	Oregon State (23-6)	Pepperdine (26-8)	Arkansas (29-10)	Arkansas (32-11)	South Carolina (33-13)	Arkansas (36-14)	South Carolina (38-15)	Virginia (41-13)	San Diego (43-16)	Mississippi State (38-22)	8.
9.	Virginia	Rice (11-6)	Pepperdine (15-5)	Texas (19-7)	Rice (19-9)	Rice (22-10)	Oregon State (25-7)	Oregon State (28-8)	Oregon State (31-8)	Oregon State (34-9)	Arizona State (34-12)	Texas A&M (40-12)	San Diego (41-15)	South Carolina (42-18)	Vanderbilt (54-13)	9.
10.	Vanderbilt	Pepperdine (13-4)	Texas A&M (18-2)	Texas A&M (20-3)	Arizona State (21-8)	Pepperdine (23-8)	Arkansas (25-10)	Arizona State (29-10)	Arizona State (32-10)	Arizona State (34-12)	Wichita State (41-13)	San Diego (41-15)	Wichita State (46-17)	Texas A&M (44-16)	South Carolina (46-20)	10.
11.	Georgia Tech	Arizona State (12-5)	Texas (15-7)	Arkansas (16-6)	Clemson (15-7)	Wichita State (24-6)	Arizona State (26-10)	Pepperdine (28-11)	Wichita State (34-9)	Wichita State (36-12)	Oregon State (35-11)	Arkansas (37-16)	Texas A&M (41-15)	Arkansas (41-19)	Wichita State (53-22)	11.
12.	Nebraska	Arkansas (10-5)	Arkansas (13-5)	Pepperdine (17-7)	Pepperdine (19-8)	Arizona State (23-10)	Arizona (28-6)	Arizona (30-7)	Pepperdine (30-13)	Texas A&M (35-11)	Texas A&M (38-11)	Wichita State (43-16)	Arkansas (38-18)	Coastal Carolina (48-11)	Texas A&M (48-19)	12.
13.	Wichita State	Texas (12-6)	Auburn (17-2)	Arizona State (19-7)	Wichita State (21-5)	Texas A&M (25-6)	Texas A&M (27-7)	Wichita State (30-8)	Arizona (31-9)	Ole Miss (30-16)	San Diego (38-14)	Oklahoma State (37-13)	Arizona (39-13)	Missouri (40-16)	Clemson (41-23)	13.
14.	Arizona State	Wichita State (10-4)	Arizona State (13-7)	Wichita State (16-5)	Texas A&M (22-5)	Cal State Fullerton (18-10)	Wichita State (26-8)	Texas A&M (30-8)	Cal State Fullerton (26-12)	Pepperdine (30-15)	Arizona (35-11)	Clemson (34-18)	Coastal Carolina (44-11)	Wichita State (49-19)	Texas (46-17)	14.
15.	Oregon State (4)	Miami (FL) (11-5)	Cal State Fullerton (12-8)	Cal State Fullerton (13-9)	Cal State Fullerton (15-10)	Oklahoma State (22-6)	Clemson (23-9)	Clemson (25-10)	Oklahoma State (31-10)	Arizona (32-11)	Coastal Carolina (38-9)	Coastal Carolina (41-10)	Missouri (39-14)	Arizona (40-15)	Florida State (49-13)	15.
16.	Tulane	Texas A&M (15-1)	Wichita State (13-4)	Kentucky (20-2)	Kentucky (23-2)	Coastal Carolina (27-3)	Ole Miss (24-10)	Cal State Fullerton (23-12)	Texas A&M (32-10)	San Diego (34-14)	Clemson (31-16)	Oregon State (36-13)	Clemson (36-20)	UC Irvine (40-15)	Ole Miss (40-25)	16.
17.	Florida State	Auburn (13-2)	Kentucky (16-0)	Coastal Carolina (19-3)	Coastal Carolina (23-3)	Clemson (18-9)	Oklahoma State (23-8)	Oklahoma State (26-9)	Clemson (26-13)	Clemson (29-15)	Pepperdine (31-16)	Arizona (36-12)	UC Irvine (38-14)	Clemson (38-21)	Virginia (45-16)	17.
18.	Ole Miss	Nebraska (5-4)	Long Beach State (10-5)	Ole Miss (15-7)	Oklahoma State (19-6)	Arizona (25-6)	Cal State Fullerton (19-12)	Mississippi State (23-8)	Ole Miss (27-15)	Coastal Carolina (36-9)	Ole Miss (32-18)	Long Beach State (34-14)	Oklahoma State (38-16)	Long Beach State (37-18)	Michigan (42-19)	18.
19.	Tennessee	Long Beach State (8-4)	Ole Miss (13-5)	Oklahoma State (17-5)	Ole Miss (18-8)	Ole Miss (21-9)	Coastal Carolina (28-5)	Ole Miss (25-13)	Coastal Carolina (33-8)	Oklahoma State (31-13)	Mississippi State (31-12) т	Missouri (35-14)	Ole Miss (35-21)	Ole Miss (37-23)	Oklahoma State (42-21)	19.
20.	Pepperdine	Kentucky (12-0)	Coastal Carolina (15-3)	Long Beach State (12-7)	East Carolina (19-6)	Kentucky (24-4)	UC Irvine (23-8)	Coastal Carolina (30-7)	San Diego (32-14)	Cal State Fullerton (27-15)	Oklahoma State (34-13) т	UC Irvine (34-14)	Long Beach State (35-17)	TCU (46-12)	San Diego (43-18)	20.
21.	UCLA	Ole Miss (9-4)	Oklahoma State (12-4)	Auburn (18-6)	Oklahoma (20-7)	UC Irvine (21-7)	Mississippi State (21-8)	UC Irvine (25-10)	Mississippi State (25-10)	UC Irvine (31-12)	Missouri (33-13)	Ole Miss (33-20)	TCU (43-12)	UC Riverside (37-19)	Arkansas (43-21)	21.
22.	TCU	Alabama (12-2)	Nebraska (8-5)	San Diego (19-9)	San Diego (21-10)	Oklahoma (21-9)	Kentucky (25-6)	San Diego (29-13)	UC Irvine (28-11)	Michigan (30-8)	UC Irvine (31-13)	Pepperdine (32-19)	UC Riverside (36-17)	Creighton (44-14)	UCLA (33-28)	22.
23.	Oklahoma State	Georgia Tech (8-6)	Miami (FL) (10-9)	USC (16-9)	Long Beach State (13-9)	Long Beach State (14-11)	(25-12)	NC State (26-11)	Michigan (26-8)	Mississippi State (28-12)	Long Beach State (30-14)	TCU (40-11)	Oregon State (36-16)	Charlotte (47-10) т	Coastal Carolina (50-13)	23.
24.	Baylor	Oklahoma State (10-3)	USC (15-9)	East Carolina (15-6)	UC Irvine (19-5)	East Carolina (21-8)	Oklahoma (23-11)	Stetson (30-9)	Stetson (32-11)	Missouri (31-12)	Michigan (34-10)	Mississippi State (32-16)	Louisiana-Lafayette (40-14)	Oklahoma State (38-19) т	Missouri (42-18)	24.
25.	Stanford	Coastal Carolina (12-2)	San Diego (15-9)	Alabama (15-8)	Arizona (21-6)	Tulane (22-8)	Louisiana-Lafayette (26-7)	Long Beach State (21-12)	Charlotte (32-7)	Charlotte (34-10)	UCLA (27-19)	Cal State Fullerton (31-19)	Charlotte (44-10)	Oregon State (38-17)	Arizona (42-17)	25.
	Preseason Jan 22	Week 5 Mar 5	Week 6 Mar 12	Week 7 Mar 19	Week 8 Mar 26	Week 9 Apr 2	Week 10 Apr 9	Week 11 Apr 16	Week 12 Apr 23	Week 13 Apr 30	Week 14 May 7	Week 15 May 14	Week 16 May 21	Week 17 May 28	Final Jun 25	
		Dropped: 16 Tulane; 19 Tennessee; 21 UCLA; 22 TCU; 24 Baylor; 25 Stanford	Dropped: 22 Alabama; 23 Georgia Tech	Dropped: 22 Nebraska; 23 Miami (FL)	Dropped: 21 Auburn; 23 USC; 25 Alabama	Dropped: 22 San Diego	Dropped: 23 Long Beach State; 24 East Carolina; 25 Tulane	Dropped: 22 Kentucky; 24 Oklahoma; 25 Louisiana-Lafayette	Dropped: 23 NC State; 25 Long Beach State	Dropped: 24 Stetson	Dropped: 20 Cal State Fullerton; 25 Charlotte	Dropped: 24 Michigan; 25 UCLA	Dropped: 22 Pepperdine; 24 Mississippi State; 25 Cal State Fullerton	Dropped: 24 Louisiana-Lafayette	Dropped: 18 Long Beach State; 20 TCU; 21 UC Riverside; 22 Creighton; 23 Charlotte	

== Baseball America ==
	Preseason Jan 11	Week 1 Feb 5	Week 2 Feb 12	Week 3 Feb 19	Week 4 Feb 26	Week 5 Mar 5	Week 6 Mar 12	Week 7 Mar 19	Week 8 Mar 26	Week 9 Apr 2	Week 10 Apr 9	Week 11 Apr 16	Week 12 Apr 23	Week 13 Apr 30	Week 14 May 7	Week 15 May 14	Week 16 May 21	Week 17 May 28	Week 18 June 5	Week 19 June 12	Week 20 June 25	
1.	Rice	Rice (1–0)	Clemson (0–0)	North Carolina (3–0)	North Carolina (7–0)	North Carolina (11–1)	North Carolina (15–1)	Vanderbilt (21–1)	South Carolina (21–4)	Vanderbilt (26–4)	Vanderbilt (29–5)	Vanderbilt (32–6)	Vanderbilt (35–8)	Vanderbilt (39–8)	Vanderbilt (41–9)	Vanderbilt (43–10)	Vanderbilt (46–10)	Vanderbilt (51–11)	Rice (52–12)	Rice (54–12)	Oregon State	1.
2.	Miami (FL)	Clemson (0–0)	North Carolina (0–0)	Clemson (2–1)	Clemson (6–1)	Vanderbilt (14–0)	Vanderbilt (18–0)	South Carolina (17–3)	Florida State (16–1)	Florida State (29–2)	North Carolina (29–5)	North Carolina (32–6)	Florida State (37–6)	Florida State (39–7)	Florida State (42–7)	Rice (41–11)	Rice (45–11)	Rice (49–12)	North Carolina (51–12)	North Carolina (53–13)	North Carolina	2.
3.	Clemson	North Carolina (0–0)	South Carolina (3–0)	Vanderbilt (6–0)	Vanderbilt (10–0)	South Carolina (10–1)	South Carolina (13–2)	Florida State (23–0)	Vanderbilt (23–3)	Virginia (27–5)	Florida State (31–4)	Florida State (35–4)	Virginia (34–9)	Virginia (37–10)	Virginia (38–10)	Florida State (43–9)	Florida State (46–9)	North Carolina (48–12)	Arizona State (46–13)	Arizona State (48–13)	Rice	3.
4.	Texas	South Carolina (0–0)	Vanderbilt (3–0)	South Carolina (5–1)	South Carolina (8–1)	Virginia (14–1)	Florida State (20–0)	Oregon State (20–3)	Oregon State (22–3)	North Carolina (25–5)	South Carolina (26–7)	South Carolina (28–8)	Rice (33–11)	Rice (37–11)	Rice (37–11)	North Carolina (41–11)	North Carolina (45–11)	San Diego (43–16)	UC Irvine (43–15)	UC Irvine (45–15)	UC Irvine	4.
5.	North Carolina	Miami (FL) (0–2)	Miami (FL) (3–2)	Arkansas (6–2)	Arkansas (9–3)	Florida State (17–0)	Oregon State (17–3)	Virginia (19–4)	Virginia (22–5)	South Carolina (23–6)	Virginia (29–7)	Texas (31–10)	Texas (33–12)	Texas (37–12)	North Carolina (37–10)	San Diego (41–15)	San Diego (41–15)	Texas (44–15)	Vanderbilt (54–13)	Vanderbilt (54–13)	Arizona State	5.
6.	South Carolina	Arkansas (2–1)	Arkansas (4–2)	Rice (5–4)	Rice (9–4)	Clemson (7–3)	Clemson (10–4)	Clemson (14–4)	North Carolina (22–4)	Arkansas (22–8)	Texas (28–10)	Virginia (31–8)	North Carolina (33–9)	North Carolina (37–10)	San Diego (38–14)	Virginia (39–12)	Texas (42–14)	Arizona State (43–13)	South Carolina (45–18)	Oregon State (43–18)	Vanderbilt	6.
7.	Arkansas	Texas (1–2)	Rice (2–3)	Virginia (4–1)	Virginia (10–1)	Cal State Fullerton (12–5)	Virginia (16–3)	North Carolina (18–3)	Arkansas (19–7)	Texas (25–9)	Rice (26–10)	Rice (29–11)	Arkansas (32–11)	Arkansas (35–12)	Texas (38–14)	Texas (39–15)	Arizona State (41–12)	Florida State (47–11)	Texas A&M (48–18)	Mississippi State (38–20)	Louisville	7.
8.	Vanderbilt	Vanderbilt (0–0)	Virginia (2–1)	Florida State (9–0)	Florida State (13–0)	Rice (11–6)	Rice (14–7)	Rice (17–7)	Rice (19–9)	Rice (22–10)	Oregon State (25–7)	Oregon State (28–8)	Oregon State (31–8)	Oregon State (34–9)	Arkansas (36–14)	Arizona State (37–12)	Virginia (41–13)	Virginia (43–14)	Wichita State (53–19)	Louisville (36–22)	Mississippi State	8.
9.	Virginia	Virginia (0–0)	Florida State (6–0)	Oregon State (9–1)	Oregon State (11–2)	Oregon State (13–3)	Arkansas (13–4)	Arkansas (16–5)	Texas (22–8)	Oregon State (23–6)	Arkansas (25–10)	Arkansas (29–10)	South Carolina (31–10)	San Diego (34–14)	Wichita State (41–130	Texas A&M (40–12)	South Carolina (40–16)	UC Irvine (40–15)	Clemson (41–21)	Cal State Fullerton (38–23)	Cal State Fullerton	9.
10.	Wichita State	Wichita State (0–0)	Oregon State (7–0)	Cal State Fullerton (7–2)	Cal State Fullerton (9–4)	Arkansas (10–4)	Texas (15–7)	Texas (19–7)	Wichita State (21–5)	Wichita State (24–6)	Pepperdine (26–8)	Wichita State (30–8)	Wichita State (34–9)	Wichita State (36–12)	Arizona State (34–12)	Arkansas (37–16)	UC Irvine (38–14)	Coastal Carolina (48–11)	Texas (46–17)	South Carolina (46–20)	South Carolina	10.
11.	Tennessee	UCLA (2–1)	Wichita State (0–0)	Miami (FL) (4–4)	Wichita State (8–2)	Miami (FL) (9–5)	Pepperdine (15–5)	Wichita State (16–5)	Clemson (15–7)	Pepperdine (23–8)	Wichita State (26–8)	Arizona State (29–10)	Arizona State (32–10)	Arizona State (34–12)	Texas A&M (38–11)	South Carolina (38–15)	Missouri (39–14)	Arkansas (41–19)	Florida State (49–13)	Texas (46–17)	Texas	11.
12.	Georgia Tech	Cal State Fullerton (3–0)	Cal State Fullerton (2–1)	Wichita State (1–2)	Miami (FL) (6–5)	Texas (12–6)	Wichita State (13–4)	Pepperdine (15–5)	Pepperdine (19–8)	Cal State Fullerton (18–10)	Arizona State (26–10)	Arizona (30–7)	Oklahoma State (31–10)	UC Irvine (31–12)	South Carolina (35–14)	UC Irvine (34–14)	Wichita State (46–16)	South Carolina (42–18)	Virginia (45–16)	Texas A&M (48–20)	Texas A&M	12.
13.	UCLA	Georgia Tech (0–0)	Arizona State (2–1)	Texas (6–5)	Texas (9–6)	Pepperdine (13–4)	Cal State Fullerton (12–8)	Cal State Fullerton (13–9)	Cal State Fullerton (15–10)	Oklahoma State (22–6)	Arizona (28–6)	Pepperdine (28–11)	Pepperdine (30–13)	Texas A&M (35–11)	UC Irvine (31–13)	Wichita State (43–15)	Arizona (39–14)	Texas A&M (44–17)	Ole Miss (40–23)	Wichita State (53–21)	Wichita State	13.
14.	Cal State Fullerton	Florida State (3–0)	Texas (3–4)	Arizona State (7–3)	Arizona State (10–3)	Wichita State (10–4)	Oklahoma State (12–4)	Oklahoma State (17–5)	Oklahoma State (19–6)	Coastal Carolina (27–3)	Clemson (23–9)	Clemson (25–10)	Arizona (31–9)	South Carolina (33–13)	Arizona (35–11)	Arizona (36–12)	Coastal Carolina (44–11)	Missouri (40–16)	San Diego (43–18)	Florida State (49–13)	Florida State	14.
15.	Tulane	Oregon State (4–0)	UCLA (2–4)	UCLA (6–4)	Georgia Tech (6–4)	Arizona State (12–5)	Coastal Carolina (15–3)	Coastal Carolina (19–3)	Coastal Carolina (23–3)	Arizona State (23–10)	Oklahoma State (23–8)	Oklahoma State (26–9)	Cal State Fullerton (26–12)	Arizona (32–11)	Oregon State (35–11)	Clemson (34–18)	Arkansas (38–18)	Wichita State (49–18)	Michigan (42–17)	Clemson (41–23)	Clemson	15.
16.	Oregon State	Arizona State (3–0)	Georgia Tech (0–2)	Georgia Tech (3–3)	San Diego (11–5)	Oklahoma State (10–3)	Texas A&M (18–2)	Texas A&M (20–3)	Arizona State (21–7)	Texas A&M (25–6)	Texas A&M (27–7)	Texas A&M (30–8)	UC Irvine (28–11)	Michigan (30–8)	Michigan (34–10)	Oklahoma State (37–13)	UC Riverside (36–17)	TCU (46–12)	Oregon State (41–18)	Virginia (45–16)	Virginia	16.
17.	Nebraska	San Diego (2–1)	Oklahoma State (3–0)	Oklahoma State (5–1)	Pepperdine (10–3)	Coastal Carolina (12–2)	Long Beach State (10–5)	Arizona State (19–7)	Oklahoma (20–7)	Arizona (23–10)	UC Irvine (23–8)	Cal State Fullerton (23–12)	San Diego (32–14)	Pepperdine (30–15)	Pepperdine (31–16)	Coastal Carolina (41–10)	Texas A&M (41–15)	Arizona (40–15)	Coastal Carolina (50–13)	Ole Miss (40–25)	Ole Miss	17.
18.	Florida State	Tulane (0–0)	San Diego (6–3)	San Diego (9–4)	Nebraska (5–2)	Texas A&M (15–1)	Arizona State (13–7)	Long Beach State (12–7)	Texas A&M (22–5)	Clemson (18–9)	Cal State Fullerton (19–12)	UC Irvine (25–10)	Texas A&M (32–10)	Clemson (29–15)	Clemson (31–16)	Long Beach State (34–14)	TCU (43–12)	Clemson (38–21)	Arkansas (43–21)	San Diego (43–18)	San Diego	18.
19.	Pepperdine	Nebraska (0–0)	Nebraska (0–0)	Nebraska (3–1)	Long Beach State (8–4)	Long Beach State (8–4)	Southern Carolina (15–9)	Southern California (16–9)	East Carolina (19–6)	Oklahoma (21–9)	Coastal Carolina (28–5)	San Diego (29–13)	Clemson (26–13)	Ole Miss (30–16)	Oklahoma State (34–13)	Missouri (35–14)	Clemson (36–20)	UC Riverside (37–19)	Mississippi State (36–20)	Michigan (42–19)	Michigan	19.
20.	Arizona State	Tennessee (0–3)	Tennessee (2–4)	Pepperdine (7–3)	UC Riverside (9–4)	Southern California (13–7)	Auburn (17–2)	Oklahoma (17–6)	San Diego (21–10)	Ole Miss (21–9)	Ole Miss (24–10)	Mississippi State (23–8)	Michigan (26–8)	Oklahoma State (31–13)	Coastal Carolina (38–9)	TCU (40–11)	St. John's (39–15)	Creighton (44–14)	UCLA (33–26)	Coastal Carolina (50–13)	Coastal Carolina	20.
21.	Evansville	Evansville (0–0)	Evansville (21)	Tulane (4–2)	Oklahoma State (6–3)	Georgia Tech (8–6)	Oklahoma (13–5)	San Diego (19–9)	Ole Miss (18–8)	Tulane (22–8)	San Diego (26–12)	Coastal Carolina (30–7)	Coastal Carolina (33–8)	Coastal Carolina (36–9)	UCLA (27–19)	UC Riverside (33–17)	Oklahoma State (38–16)	Long Beach State (37–18)	Oklahoma State (41–19)	Arkansas (43–21)	Arkansas	21.
22.	Oklahoma State	Oklahoma State (0–0)	Tulane (1–2)	TCU (6–1)	Coastal Carolina (9–1)	San Diego (12–8)	San Diego (15–9)	East Carolina (15–6)	Kentucky (23–2)	East Carolina (21–8)	Mississippi State (21–8)	Michigan (22–6)	Mississippi State (25–10)	UCLA (24–18)	Long Beach State (30–14)	Oregon State (36–13)	Long Beach State (35–17)	Charlotte (47–10)	Louisville (44–21)	UCLA (33–28)	UCLA	22.
23.	Winthrop	Peppedine (1–2)	Pepperdine (4–2)	Winthrop (6–1)	UCLA (7–7)	UCLA (7–7)	Ole Miss (13–5)	Ole Miss (15–7)	Long Beach State (13–9)	UC Irvine (21–7)	Oklahoma (23–11)	Tulane (27–11)	Ole Miss (27–15)	TCU (34–10)	TCU (37–11)	St. John's (36–14)	Michigan (39–14)	Rutgers (41–19)	Missouri (42–18)	Oklahoma State (42–21)	Oklahoma State	23.
24.	TCU	TCU (0–0)	TCU (2–1)	Ole Miss (4–1)	NC State (8–1)	Auburn (13–2)	Kentucky (16–0)	UC Irvine (19–5)	UC Irvine (19–5)	Kentucky (24–4)	Tulane (24–10)	Ole Miss (25–13)	Georgia Tech (26–14)	Long Beach State (27–14)	Ole Miss (32–18)	Michigan (36–13)	Pepperdine (35–20)	Pepperdine (35–20)	TCU (48–14)	Missouri (42–18)	Missouri	24.
25.	Ole Miss	Winthrop (1–2)	Winthrop (4–2)	Evansville (3–3)	Texas A&M (11–1)	Evansville (8–4)	East Carolina (11–6)	Kentucky (20–2)	South California (17–12)	Southern California (18–12)	Missouri (24–9)	NC State (26–11)	UCLA (22–16)	UC Riverside (27–16)	UC Riverside (30–17)	Pepperdine (32–19)	Creighton (39–13)	Ole Miss (37–23)	Cal State Fullerton (36–23)	TCU (48–14)	TCU	25.
	Preseason Jan 11	Week 1 Feb 5	Week 2 Feb 12	Week 3 Feb 19	Week 4 Feb 26	Week 5 Mar 5	Week 6 Mar 12	Week 7 Mar 19	Week 8 Mar 26	Week 9 Apr 2	Week 10 Apr 9	Week 11 Apr 16	Week 12 Apr 23	Week 13 Apr 30	Week 14 May 7	Week 15 May 14	Week 16 May 21	Week 17 May 28	Week 18 June 5	Week 19 June 12	Week 20 June 25	
		Dropped: 25 Ole Miss	None	Dropped: 20 Tennessee	Dropped: 21 Tulane; 22 TCU; 23 Winthrop; 24 Ole Miss; 25 Evansville	Dropped: 18 Nebraska; 20 UC Riverside; 24 NC State	Dropped: 11 Miami (FL); 21 Georgia Tech; 23 UCLA; 25 Evansville	Dropped: 20 Auburn	None	Dropped: 20 San Diego; 23 Long Beach State	Dropped: 22 East Carolina; 24 Kentucky; 25 Southern California	Dropped: 23 Oklahoma; 25 Missouri	Dropped: 23 Tulane; 25 NC State	Dropped: 15 Cal State Fullerton; 22 Mississippi State; 24 Georgia Tech	None	Dropped: 21 UCLA; 24 Ole Miss	Dropped: 22 Oregon State	Dropped: 20 St. John's; 21 Oklahoma State; 23 Michigan	Dropped: 17 Arizona; 19 UC Riverside; 20 Creighton; 21 Long Beach State; 22 Charlotte; 23 Rutgers; 24 Pepperdine	None	None	

== Collegiate Baseball ==
	Preseason Dec 22	Week 1 Feb 5	Week 2 Feb 12	Week 3 Feb 19	Week 4 Feb 26	Week 5 Mar 5	Week 6 Mar 12	Week 7 Mar 19	Week 8 Mar 26	Week 9 Apr 2	Week 10 Apr 9	Week 11 Apr 16	Week 12 Apr 23	Week 13 Apr 30	Week 14 May 7	Week 15 May 14	Week 16 May 21	Week 17 May 28	Week 18 June 5	Week 19 June 11	Week 20 June 26	
1.	Rice	Rice (1–0)	Clemson (0–0)	Vanderbilt (6–0)	Vanderbilt (10–0)	Vanderbilt (14–0)	Vanderbilt (18–0)	Florida State (23–0)	Florida State (26–1)	Florida State (29–2)	Florida State (31–4)	Florida State (35–4)	Florida State (37–6)	Vanderbilt (39–8)	Vanderbilt (41–9)	Vanderbilt (43–10)	Vanderbilt (46–10)	Vanderbilt (51–11)	Rice (52–12)	Rice (54–12)	Oregon State (49–18)	1.
2.	Clemson	Clemson (0–0)	South Carolina (3–0)	Florida State (9–0)	Florida State (13–0)	Florida State (17–0)	Florida State (20–0)	Vanderbilt (21–1)	Oregon State (22–3)	North Carolina (25–5)	North Carolina (29–5)	North Carolina (32–6)	Vanderbilt (35–8)	Florida State (39–7)	Florida State (42–7)	Rice (41–11)	Rice (45–11)	Rice (49–12)	North Carolina (51–12)	North Carolina (53–13)	North Carolina (57–16)	2.
3.	South Carolina	South Carolina (0–0)	Vanderbilt (3–0)	North Carolina (3–0)	North Carolina (7–0)	North Carolina (11–1)	North Carolina (15–1)	Oregon State (20–3)	North Carolina (22–4)	Arkansas (22–8)	Vanderbilt (29–5)	Vanderbilt (32–6)	Arkansas (32–11)	Arkansas (35–12)	Rice (37–11)	Florida State (43–9)	Florida State (46–9)	Florida State (47–11)	Arizona State (51–120	Arizona State (48–13)	Rice (56–14)	3.
4.	Arkansas	North Carolina (0–0)	North Carolina (0–0)	South Carolina (5–1)	South Carolina (8–1)	South Carolina (10–1)	South Carolina (13–2)	North Carolina (18–3)	South Carolina (21–4)	Vanderbilt (26–4)	South Carolina (26–7)	Arkansas (29–10)	North Carolina (33–9)	Virginia (37–10)	Virginia (38–10)	North Carolina (41–11)	North Carolina (45–11)	North Carolina (48–12)	South Carolina (45–18)	UC Irvine (45–15–1)	UC Irvine (47–17–1)	4.
5.	North Carolina	Arkansas (2–1)	Florida State (6–0)	Clemson (2–1)	Clemson (6–1)	Virginia (14–1)	Oregon State (17–3)	South Carolina (17–3)	Vanderbilt (23–3)	South Carolina (23–6)	Arkansas (25–10)	South Carolina (28–8)	Virginia (34–9)	North Carolina (37–10)	North Carolina (37–10)	Virginia (39–12)	Virginia (41–13)	Virginia (43–14)	Clemson (41–21)	Oregon State (44–18)	Arizona State (49–15)	5.
6.	Miami (FL)	Vanderbilt (0–0)	Rice (2–3)	Rice (5–4)	Rice (9–4)	Clemson (7–3)	Clemson (10–4)	Clemson (14–4)	Virginia (22–5)	Virginia (27–4)	Texas (28–10)	Texas (31–10)	Arizona State (32–10)	Rice (37–11)	Arkansas (36–14)	San Diego (41–15)	San Diego (41–15)	San Diego (43–16)	UC Irvine (43–15–1)	Mississippi State (38–20)	Louisville (47–24)	6.
7.	Texas	Nebraska (0–0)	Nebraska (0–0)	Nebraska (3–1)	Nebraska (5–2)	Oregon State (13–3)	Virginia (16–3)	Virginia (19–4)	Arkansas (19–7)	Texas (25–9)	Virginia (29–7)	Arizona (30–7)	Wichita State (34–9)	Texas (37–12)	San Diego (38–14)	Texas (39–14)	Texas (42–14)	Texas (44–15)	Wichita State (53–20)	Cal State Fullerton (38–23)	Cal State Fullerton (38–25)	7.
8.	Vanderbilt	Virginia (0–0)	Cal State Fullerton (5–1)	Cal State Fullerton (7–2)	Virginia (10–1)	Cal State Fullerton (12–5)	Texas A&M (18–2)	Texas A&M (20–3)	Kentucky (23–2–1)	Wichita State (24–6)	Arizona (28–6)	Virginia (31–8)	Rice (33–11)	Oregon State (34–9)	Texas (38–14)	Arizona State (37–12)	Arizona State (41–12)	Arizona State (43–130	Texas A&M (48–17)	Louisville (46–22)	Mississippi State (38–22)	8.
9.	Nebraska	Cal State Fullerton (3–0)	Arkansas (4–2)	Oregon State (9–1)	Oregon State (11–2)	Texas A&M (15–1)	Rice (14–7)	Rice (17–7)	Texas (22–8)	Oregon State (23–6)	Oregon State (25–7)	Arizona State (29–10)	Texas (33–12)	Arizona State (34–12)	Wichita State (41–13)	Arkansas (37–16)	Arkansas (38–18)	Arkansas (41–19)	Vanderbilt (54–13)	Vanderbilt (54–13)	Vanderbilt (54–14)	9.
10.	Virginia	Florida State (3–0)	Virginia (2–1)	Arkansas (6–2)	Arkansas (9–3)	Rice (11–6)	Auburn (17–2)	Arkansas (16–6)	Arizona State (21–8)	Ole Miss (21–9)	Arizona State (26–10)	Wichita State (30–8)	South Carolina (31–10)	San Diego (34–14)	UCLA (27–19)	South Carolina (38–15)	South Carolina (40–16)	South Carolina (42–18)	Florida State (49–13)	Florida State (49–13)	Florida State (49–13)	10.
11.	Georgia Tech	Georgia Tech (0–0)	Arizona State (5–1)	Virginia (4–1)	Cal State Fullerton (9–4)	Arkansas (10–5)	Arkansas (13–5)	Kentucky (20–2)	Wichita State (21–5)	Kentucky (24–4–1)	Wichita State (26–8)	Oregon State (28–8)	Oregon State (31–8)	UCLA (24–18)	Arizona State (34–12)	Long Beach State (34–14)	Arizona (39–13)	Arizona (40–15)	Oregon State (42–18)	South Carolina (46–20)	South Carolina (46–20)	11.
12.	Cal State Fullerton	Arizona State (3–0)	Oregon State (7–0)	TCU (6–1)	Arizona State (10–3)	Pepperdine (13–4)	Kentucky (16–0)	Texas (19–7)	Clemson (15–7)	Arizona State (23–10)	Rice (26–10)	Rice (29–11)	Arizona (31–9)	Wichita State (36–12)	Oregon State (35–11)	UCLA (28–22)	Wichita State (46–17)	Coastal Carolina (48–11)	Virginia (45–16)	Clemson (41–23)	Clemson (41–23)	12.
13.	Florida State	Texas (1–2)	Miami (FL) (3–2)	Ole Miss (4–1)	Pepperdine (10–3)	Auburn (13–2)	Pepperdine (15–5)	Ole Miss (15–7)	Ole Miss (18–8)	Texas A&M (25–6)	Ole Miss (24–10)	Clemson (25–10)	Oklahoma State (31–10)	Michigan (30–8)	Mississippi State (31–12)	Arizona (36–12)	UC Riverside (36–17)	Clemson (38–21)	San Diego (43–18)	Wichita State (53–22)	Wichita State (53–22)	13.
14.	Arizona State	Miami (FL) (0–2)	Georgia Tech (0–2)	Arizona State (7–3)	Georgia Tech (6–4)	Arizona State (12–5)	Ole Miss (13–5)	Arizona State (19–7)	Texas A&M (22–5)	Rice (22–10)	Clemson (23–9)	Texas A&M (30–8)	Cal State Fullerton (26–12)	Ole Miss (30–16)	South Carolina (35–14)	Wichita State (43–16)	Missouri (39–14)	UC Riverside (37–19)	Texas (46–17)	Texas A&M (48–19)	Texas A&M (48–19)	14.
15.	TCU	TCU (0–0)	Ole Miss (2–0)	Georgia Tech (3–3)	Miami (FL) (6–5)	Miami (FL) (9–5)	Cal State Fullerton (12–8)	Wichita State (16–5)	Rice (19–9)	Arizona (25–6)	Texas A&M (27–7)	Mississippi State (23–8)	Pepperdine (30–13)	Mississippi State (28–12)	Arizona (35–11)	Clemson (34–18)	Clemson (36–20)	UC Irvine (40–15–1)	Arkansas (43–21)	Virginia (45–16)	Virginia (45–16)	15.
16.	Tulane	Tulane (0–0)	TCU (2–1)	Miami (FL) (4–4)	Ole Miss (6–3)	Ole Miss (9–4)	Nebraska (8–5)	Cal State Fullerton (13–9)	Cal State Fullerton (15–10)	Clemson (18–9)	Pepperdine (26–8)	Pepperdine (28–11)	San Diego (32–14)	UC Riverside (27–16)	Long Beach State (30–14)	UC Riverside (33–17)	Long Beach State (35–17)	Long Beach State (37–18)	Ole Miss (40–23)	San Diego (43–18)	San Diego (43–18)	16.
17.	Wichita State	Wichita State (0–0)	Arizona (8–0)	Arizona (9–2)	Arizona (11–3)	Nebraska (5–4)	Long Beach State (10–5)	Pepperdine (17–7)	Pepperdine (19–8)	Cal State Fullerton (18–10)	Florida (20–15)	Michigan (22–6)	Mississippi State (25–10)	South Carolina (33–13)	UC Riverside (30–17)	Missouri (35–14)	UC Irvine (38–14–1)	Wichita State (49–19)	Mississippi State (36–20)	Texas (46–17)	Texas (46–17)	17.
18.	Tennessee	San Diego (5–1)	Wichita State (0–0)	Pepperdine (7–3)	Wichita State (8–2)	Kentucky (12–0)	Arizona State (13–7)	Long Beach State (12–7)	Long Beach State (13–9)	Pepperdine (23–8)	Mississippi State (21–8)	San Diego (29–13)	UCLA (22–16)	Arizona (32–11)	Ole Miss (32–18)	Oklahoma State (37–13)	Coastal Carolina (44–11)	Missouri (40–16)	Cal State Fullerton (36–23)	Arkansas (43–21)	Arkansas (43–21)	18.
19.	Pepperdine	Ole Miss (0–0)	Pepperdine (4–2)	Wichita State (1–2)	Texas A&M (11–1)	Texas (12–6)	Texas (15–7)	Oklahoma State (17–5)	Coastal Carolina (23–3)	Coastal Carolina (27–3)	Kentucky (25–6–1)	Oklahoma State (26–9)	Georgia Tech (26–14)	Pepperdine (30–15)	Missouri (33–13)	Oregon State (36–13)	Mississippi State (33–18)	Texas A&M (44–16)	Michigan (42–17)	Ole Miss (40–25)	Ole Miss (40–25)	19.
20.	Ole Miss	Baylor (0–0)	Long Beach State (4–2)	Long Beach State (5–4)	Long Beach State (8–4)	Long Beach State (8–4)	Wichita State (13–4)	Coastal Carolina (19–3)	Oklahoma (20–7)	Oklahoma State (22–6)	UC Irvine (23–8–1)	UC Irvine (25–10–1)	Michigan (26–8)	Cal State Fullerton (27–15)	Pepperdine (31–16)	Mississippi State (32–16)	Ole Miss (35–21)	Ole Miss (37–23)	Oklahoma State (41–19)	Michigan (42–19)	Michigan (42–19)	20.
21.	Baylor	Georgia (0–0)	Southern California (5–3)	San Diego (9–4)	San Diego (11–5)	Georgia Tech (8–6)	Arizona (15–6)	Oklahoma (17–6)	East Carolina (19–6)	Oklahoma (21–9)	Cal State Fullerton (19–12)	Cal State Fullerton 923–12)	Clemson (26–13)	Missouri (31–12)	Michigan (34–10)	Ole Miss (33–20)	Oklahoma State (38–16)	Louisiana–Lafayette (43–15)	Louisville (44–21)	Oklahoma State (42–21)	Oklahoma State (42–21)	21.
22.	Georgia	Oregon State (4–0)	San Diego (6–3)	Texas (6–5)	Texas (9–6)	Alabama (12–2)	Oklahoma State (12–4)	East Carolina (15–6)	Oklahoma State (19–6)	Florida (18–13)	Oklahoma State (23–8)	Stetson (30–9)	Texas A&M (32–10)	Oklahoma State (31–13)	Oklahoma State (34–13)	Texas A&M (40–12)	Louisiana–Lafayette (40–14)	Creighton (44–14)	Arizona (42–17)	Arizona (42–17)	Arizona (42–17)	22.
23.	Stanford	Pepperdine (1–2)	Texas (3–4)	Oklahoma State (5–1)	TCU (7–4)	TCU (10–4)	Coastal Carolina (15–3)	Arizona (16–6)	Arizona (21–6)	Mississippi State (18–7)	Coastal Carolina (28–5)	Ole Miss (25–13)	UC Irvine (28–11–1)	Clemson (29–15)	Clemson (31–16)	UC Irvine (34–14–1)	Texas A&M (41–15)	TCU (46–12)	UCLA (33–26)	UCLA (33–28)	UCLA (33–28)	23.
24.	Oklahoma State	Oklahoma State (0–0)	Oklahoma State (3–0)	Texas A&M (7–1)	Auburn (10–1)	Arizona (13–5)	Oklahoma (13–5)	San Diego (19–9)	San Diego (21–10)	UC Irvine (21–7–1)	San Diego (26–12)	UCLA (28–16)	Stetson (32–11)	Georgia Tech (27–17)	Georgia Tech (29–17)	Cal State Fullerton (31–19)	TCU (43–12)	Oral Roberts (40–15)	Coastal Carolina (50–13)	Coastal Carolina (50–13)	Coastal Carolina (50–13)	24.
25.	Southern California	Arizona (3–0)	Tulane (1–2)	Tulane (4–2)	NC State (8–1)	Wichita State (10–4)	Southern California (15–9)	Southern California (16–9)	Missouri (20–6)	Tulane (22–8)	Michigan (16–6)	NC State (26–11)	Ole Miss (27–15)	Texas A&M (35–11)	Texas A&M (38–11)	TCU (40–11)	Miami (FL) (35–20)	Charlotte (47–10)	UC Riverside (38–21)	UC Riverside (38–21)	UC Riverside (38–21)	25.
26.	UCLA	Tennessee (0–3)	Evansville (2–1)	NC State (5–0)	Coastal Carolina (9–1)	Southern California (13–7)	Southern Miss (12–4)	Nebraska (10–7)	TCU (18–7)	East Carolina (21–8)	NC State (24–10)	Charlotte (29–6)	Charlotte (32–17)	UC Irvine (31–12–1)	UC Irvine (31–13–1)	Stetson (38–14)	UCLA (29–24)	Rutgers (41–19)	Long Beach State (39–20)	Long Beach State (39–20)	Long Beach State (39–20)	26.
27.	Arizona	UCLA (2–1)	Oral Roberts (2–0)	Florida Atlantic (9–0)	Florida Atlantic (10–2)	Southern Miss (10–2)	East Carolina (11–6)	Auburn (18–6)	UC Irvine (19–5–1)	Long Beach State (14–11)	College of Charleston (24–8)	TCU (27–9)	TCU (30–10)	TCU (34–10)	TCU (37–11)	Coastal Carolina (41–10)	NC State (36–19)	Mississippi State (33–20)	Missouri (42–18)	Missouri (42–18)	Missouri (42–18)	27.
28.	Evansville	Evansville (0–0)	Texas A&M (3–1)	Alabama (6–1)	Southern California (9–7)	NC State (10–3)	TCU (11–6)	TCU (15–6)	Louisiana–Lafayette (20–5)	TCU (21–7)	TCU (23–9)	Tulane (27–11)	Houston (22–17)	Stetson (32–12)	Stetson (36–12)	Pepperdine (32–19)	Oregon State (36–16)	Miami (FL) (36–22)	TCU (48–14)	TCU (48–14)	TCU (48–14)	28.
29.	Oral Roberts	Oral Roberts (0–0)	UC Riverside (5–1)	Auburn (6–1)	Baylor (7–4)	Coastal Carolina (12–2)	UC Irvine (15–5–1)	UC Irvine (19–5–1)	Tulane (19–7)	Missouri (22–8)	Missouri (24–9)	Cal Poly (20–18)	Rutgers (24–14)	St. John's (29–12)	Coastal Carolin (38–9)	Georgia Tech (31–20)	Pepperdine (35–20)	Oregon State (38–17)	Charlotte (49–12)	Charlotte (49–12)	Charlotte (49–12)	29.
30.	Long Beach State	Long Beach State (2–1)	NC State (3–0)	Coastal Carolina (7–0)	South Florida (9–1)	College of Charleston (11–1)	VMI (12–3)	VMI (16–4)	Texas State (19–8)	Louisiana–Lafayette (23–6)	Louisiana–Lafayette (26–7)	College of Charleston (27–9)	College of Charleston (31–10)	College of Charleston (34–10)	St. John's (32–13)	St. John's (36–14)	St. John's (39–15)	Pepperdine (35–20)	Rutgers (42–21)	Rutgers (42–21)	Rutgers (42–21)	30.
	Preseason Dec 22	Week 1 Feb 5	Week 2 Feb 12	Week 3 Feb 19	Week 4 Feb 26	Week 5 Mar 5	Week 6 Mar 12	Week 7 Mar 19	Week 8 Mar 26	Week 9 Apr 2	Week 10 Apr 9	Week 11 Apr 16	Week 12 Apr 23	Week 13 Apr 30	Week 14 May 7	Week 15 May 14	Week 16 May 21	Week 17 May 28	Week 18 June 5	Week 19 June 11	Week 20 June 26	
		Dropped: 23 Stanford; 25 Southern California	Dropped: 20 Baylor; 21 Georgia; 26 Tennessee; 27 UCLA	Dropped: 21 Southern California; 26 Evansville; 27 Oral Roberts; 29 UC Riverside	Dropped: 23 Oklahoma State; 25 Tulane; 28 Alabama	Dropped: 21 San Diego; 27 Florida Atlantic; 29 Baylor; 30 South Florida	Dropped: 21 Georgia Tech; 22 Alabama; 28 NC State; 30 College of Charleston	Dropped: 26 Southern Miss	Dropped: 25 Southern California; 26 Nebraska; 27 Auburn; 30 VMI	Dropped: 29 San Diego; 30 Texas State	Dropped: 21 Oklahoma; 25 Tulane; 26 East Carolina; 27 Long Beach State	Dropped: 17 Florida; 19 Kentucky; 23 Coastal Carolina; 29 Missouri; 30 Louisiana–Lafayette	Dropped: 25 NC State; 28 Tulane; 29 Cal Poly	Dropped: 26 Charlotte; 28 Houston; 29 Rutgers	Dropped: 20 Cal State Fullerton; 30 College of Charleston	Dropped: 21 Michigan	Dropped: 24 Cal State Fullerton; 26 Stetson; 29 Georgia Tech	Dropped: 21 Oklahoma State; 26 UCLA; 27 NC State; 30 St. John's	Dropped: 21 Louisiana–Lafayette; 22 Creighton; 24 Oral Roberts; 28 Miami (FL); 30 Pepperdine	None	None	

The preseason poll ranked the top 40 teams. Remaining teams not listed above were: 31. LSU 32. Mississippi State 33. Houston 34. Oklahoma 35. Troy 36. San Francisco 37. Winthrop 38. Michigan 39. Notre Dame 40. Ohio State

== NCBWA ==
	Preseason Jan 10	Week 2 Feb 12	Week 3 Feb 19	Week 4 Feb 26	Week 5 Mar 5	Week 6 Mar 12	Week 7 Mar 19	Week 8 Mar 26	Week 9 Apr 2	Week 10 Apr 9	Week 11 Apr 16	Week 12 Apr 23	Week 13 Apr 30	Week 14 May 7	Week 15 May 14	Week 16 May 21	Week 17 May 28	Week 18 June 5	Week 19 June 12	Final June 25	
1.	Rice	South Carolina (3–0)	Vanderbilt (6–0)	Vanderbilt (10–0)	Vanderbilt (14–0)	Vanderbilt (18–0)	Vanderbilt (21–1)	Florida State (26–1)	Vanderbilt (26–4)	Vanderbilt (29–5)	Vanderbilt (32–6)	Vanderbilt (35–8)	Vanderbilt (39–8)	Vanderbilt (41–9)	Vanderbilt (43–10)	Vanderbilt (46–10)	Vanderbilt (51–11)	Rice (52–12)	Rice (54–12)	Oregon State (49–18)	1.
2.	Clemson	Clemson (0–0)	South Carolina (5–1)	South Carolina (8–1)	South Carolina (10–1)	North Carolina (15–1)	Florida State (23–0)	South Carolina (21–4)	Florida State (29–2)	North Carolina (29–5)	North Carolina (32–6)	Florida State (37–6)	Florida State (39–7)	Florida State (42–7)	Rice (41–11)	Rie (45–11)	Rice (49–12)	North Carolina (51–12)	North Carolina (53–13)	North Carolina (57–16)	2.
3.	South Carolina	North Carolina (0–0)	North Carolina (3–0)	North Carolina (7–0)	North Carolina (11–1)	Florida State (20–0)	South Carolina (17–3)	Vanderbilt (23–3)	North Carolina (25–5)	South Carolina (26–7)	Florida State (35–4)	Rice (33–11)	Rice (37–11)	Rice (37–11)	North Carolina (41–11)	Florida State (46–9)	North Carolina (48–12)	Arizona State (46–13)	Arizona State (48–13)	Rice (56–14)	3.
4.	North Carolina	Vanderbilt (3–0)	Clemson (2–1)	Clemson (6–1)	Florida State (17–0)	South Carolina (13–2)	Oregon State (20–3)	Oregon State (22–3)	South Carolina (23–6)	Florida State (31–4)	South Carolina (28–8)	South Carolina (31–10)	Texas (37–12)	North Carolina (37–10)	Florida State (43–9)	North Carolina (45–11)	Texas (44–15)	South Carolina (45–18)	UC Irvine (45–15–1)	Arizona State (49–15)	4.
5.	Miami (FL)	Cal State Fullerton (5–1)	Cal State Fullerton (7–2)	Florida State (13–0)	Virginia (14–1)	Oregon State (17–3)	North Carolina (17–3)	North Carolina (22–4)	Virginia (27–5)	Rice (26–10)	Texas (31–10)	Texas (33–12)	North Carolina (37–10)	Virginia (38–10)	Texas (39–14)	Texas (42–14)	Arizona State (43–13)	Vanderbilt (54–13)	Vanderbilt (54–13)	UC Irvine (47–17–1)	5.
6.	Texas	Rice (2–3)	Florida State (9–0)	Rice (9–4)	Cal State Fullerton (12–5)	Clemson (10–4)	Clemson (14–4)	Virginia (22–5)	Arkansas (22–8)	Texas (28–10)	Rice (29–11)	North Carolina (33–9)	Virginia (37–10)	Texas (38–14)	Arizona State (37–12)	Arizona State (41–12)	Florida State (47–11)	Texas A&M (48–17)	South Carolina (46–20)	Vanderbilt (54–13)	6.
7.	Virginia	Miami (FL) (3–2)	Oregon State (9–1)	Oregon State (11–2)	Clemson (7–3)	Rice (14–7)	Rice (17–7)	Arkansas (19–7)	Texas (25–9)	Pepperdine (26–8)	Arkansas (29–10)	Virginia (34–9)	Arkansas (35–12)	South Carolina (35–14)	South Carolina (38–15)	South Carolina (40–16)	Virginia (43–14)	Virginia (45–16)	Texas A&M (48–19)	Louisville (47–24)	7.
8.	Arkansas	Virginia (2–1)	Rice (5–4)	Virginia (10–1)	Oregon State (13–3)	Pepperdine (15–5)	Virginia (19–4)	Texas (22–8)	Rice (22–10)	Virginia (29–7)	Virginia (31–8)	Arkansas (32–11)	South Carolina (33–13)	Arizona State (34–12)	Virginia (39–12)	Virginia (41–13)	San Diego (43–16)	UC Irvine (43–15–1)	Mississippi State (38–20)	South Carolina (46–20)	8.
9.	Cal State Fullerton	Oregon State (7–0)	Virginia (4–1)	Cal State Fullerton (9–4)	Rice (11–6)	Virginia (16–3)	Texas (19–7)	Rice (19–9)	Pepperdine (23–8)	Arkansas (25–10)	Oregon State (28–8)	Oregon State (31–8)	Oregon State (34–9)	Arkansas (36–14)	Texas A&M (40–12)	San Diego (41–15)	South Carolina (42–18)	Texas (46–17)	Texas (46–17)	Mississippi State (38–22)	9.
10.	Georgia Tech	Florida State (6–0)	Arkansas (6–2)	Arizona State (10–3)	Pepperdine (13–4)	Texas (15–7)	Arkansas (16–6)	Pepperdine (19–8)	Oregon State (23–6)	Oregon State (25–7)	Arizona (30–7)	Arizona State (32–10)	Arizona State (34–12)	Texas A&M (38–11)	Oklahoma State (37–13)	Arizona (39–13)	Coastal Carolina (48–11)	Clemson (41–21)	Oregon State (44–18)	Cal State Fullerton (38–25)	10.
11.	Vanderbilt	Arkansas (4–2)	Ole Miss (4–1)	Arkansas (9–3)	Texas (12–6)	Arkansas (13–5)	Pepperdine (17–7)	Clemson (15–7)	Oklahoma State (22–6)	Arizona (28–6)	Arizona State (29–10)	Wichita State (34–9)	Texas A&M (35–11)	Wichita State (41–13)	Arkansas (37–16)	Coastal Carolina (44–11)	Texas A&M (44–16)	Florida State (49–13)	Virginia (45–16)	Texas A&M (48–19)	11.
12.	Nebraska	Arizona State (5–1)	Nebraska (3–1)	Pepperdine (10–3)	Arizona State (12–5)	Cal State Fullerton (12–8)	Cal State Fullerton (13–9)	Arizona State (21–8)	Cal State Fullerton (18–10)	Arizona State (26–10)	Pepperdine (28–11)	Oklahoma State (31–10)	Wichita State (36–12)	Oregon State (35–11)	San Diego (41–15)	Wichita State (46–17)	Arizona (40–15)	Wichita State (53–20)	Louisville (46–22)	Texas (46–17)	12.
13.	Ole Miss	Ole Miss (2–0)	Arizona State (7–3)	Nebraska (5–2)	Alabama (12–2)	Auburn (17–2)т	Texas A&M (20–3)	Kentucky (23–2–1)	Wichita State (24–6)	Clemson (23–9)	Clemson (25–10)	Arizona (31–9)	Ole Miss (30–16)	Arizona (35–11)	Arizona (36–12)	Texas A&M (41–15)	Arkansas (41–19)	Ole Miss (40–23)	Cal State Fullerton (38–23)	Virginia (45–16)	13.
14.	Arizona State	Nebraska (0–0)	Miami (FL) (4–4)	Texas (9–6)	Miami (FL) (9–5)	Kentucky (16–0) т	Arizona State (19–7)	Cal State Fullerton (15–10)	Arizona (25–6)	Oklahoma State (23–8)	Wichita State (30–8)	Cal State Fullerton (26–12)	Clemson (29–15)	San Diego (38–14)	Wichita State (43–16)	Missouri (39–14)	Wichita State (49–19)	Oklahoma State (41–19)	Clemson (41–23) т	Clemson (41–23) т	14.
15.	Florida State	Texas (3–4)	Pepperdine (7–3)	Miami (FL) 6–5)	Arkansas (10–5)	Ole Miss (13–5)	Kentucky (20–2)	Wichita State (21–5)	Arizona State (23–10)	Ole Miss (24–10)	Oklahoma State (26–9)	Pepperdine (30–13)	Arizona (32–11)	Oklahoma State (34–13)	Clemson (34–18)	Oklahoma State (38–16)	UC Irvine (40–15–1)	Coastal Carolina (50–13)	Florida State (49–13) т	Florida State (49–13) т	15.
16.	Tulane	Oklahoma State (3–0)	Oklahoma State (5–1)	Alabama (8–2) т	Ole Miss (9–4)	Texas A&M (18–2)	Oklahoma State (17–5)	Oklahoma State (19–6)	Clemson (18–9)	Wichita State (26–8)	Texas A&M (30–8)	Texas A&M (32–10)	San Diego (34–14)	Clemson (31–16)	Coastal Carolina (41–10)	UC Irvine (38–14–1)	Clemson (38–21)	Arizona (42–17)	Wichita State (53–22) т	Wichita State (53–22) т	16.
17.	Oregon State	Wichita State (0–0)	Texas (6–5)	Wichita State (8–2) т	Kentucky (12–0)	Long Beach State (10–5)	Ole Miss (15–7)	Texas A&M (22–5)	Texas A&M (25–6)	Texas A&M (27–7)	Cal State Fullerton (23–12)	Clemson (26–13)	Oklahoma State (31–13)	Coastal Carolina (38–9)	Long Beach State (34–14)	Arkansas (38–18)	Missouri (40–16)	Michigan (42–17)	Ole Miss (40–23)	Ole Miss (40–25)	17.
18.	Wichita State	Pepperdine (4–2)	TCU (6–1)	Ole Miss (6–3)	Auburn (13–2)	Oklahoma State (12–4)	Wichita State (16–5)	Ole Miss (18–8)	Coastal Carolina (27–3)	Cal State Fullerton (19–12)	Mississippi State (23–8)	Ole Miss (27–15)	Cal State Fullerton (27–15)	Mississippi State (31–12)	Oregon State (36–13)	Clemson (36–20)	Charlotte (47–10)	Arkansas (43–21)	Oklahoma State (42–21)	Oklahoma State (42–21)	18.
19.	Georgia	Georgia Tech (0–2)	Alabama (6–1)	Long Beach State (8–4)	Long Beach State (8–4)	Arizona State (13–7)	Long Beach State (12–7)	Coastal Carolina (23–3)	Ole Miss (21–9)	Mississippi State (21–8)	Ole Miss (25–13)	Mississippi State (25–10)	Coastal Carolina (36–9)	Ole Miss (32–18)	UC Irvine (34–14–1)	Ole Miss (35–21)	Long Beach State (37–18)	San Diego (43–18)	Coastal Carolina (50–13)	Coastal Carolina (50–13)	19.
20.	Pepperdine	Alabama (3–0)	Tulane (4–2)	Arizona (11–3)	Oklahoma State (10–3)	Wichita State (13–4)	Coastal Carolina (19–3)	Arizona (21–6)	Kentucky (24–4–1)	Coastal Carolina (28–5)	NC State (26–11)	Coastal Carolilna (33–8)	Mississippi State (28–15)	Long Beach State (30–14)	Missouri (35–14)	Charlotte (44–10)	TCU (46–12)	Mississippi State (36–20)	Michigan (42–19)	Michigan (42–19)	20.
21.	Oklahoma State	TCU (2–1)	Georgia Tech (3–3)	Kentucky (7–0)	Texas A&M (15–1)	Nebraska (8–5)	Arizona (16–6)	East Carolina (19–6)	NC State (22–8)	NC State (24–10)	Coastal Carolina (30–7)	San Diego (32–14)	Pepperdine (30–15)	Pepperdine (31–16)	Ole Miss (33–20)	Long Beach State (35–17)	Ole Miss (37–23)	Oregon State (42–18)	Arizona (42–17)	Arizona (42–17)	21.
22.	TCU	Tulane (1–2)	Winthrop (7–2)	Georgia Tech (6–4)	Nebraska (5–4)	Alabama (13–6)	Auburn (18–6)	Long Beach State (13–9)	East Carolina (21–7)	Kentucky (25–6–1)	San Diego (29–13)	Charlotte (32–7)	UC Irvine (31–12–1)	UC Irvine (31–13–1)	Charlotte (40–10)	TCU (43–12)	Oklahoma State (38–19)	Cal State Fullerton (36–23)	Arkansas (43–21)	Arkansas (43–21)	22.
23.	UCLA	Arizona (8–0)	Arizona (9–2)	Auburn (10–1)	Wichita State (10–4)	Coastal Carolina (15–3)	East Carolina (15–6)	Oklahoma (20–7)	Oklahoma (21–9)	Louisiana–Lafayette (26–7)	Charlotte (29–6)	UC Irvine (28–11–1)	Long Beach State (27–14)	Charlotte (38–9)	Cal State Fullerton (31–19)	Oregon State (36–16)	Creighton (44–14)	Missouri (42–18)	San Diego (43–18)	San Diego (43–18)	23.
24.	Stanford	Winthrop (4–2)	Wichita State (1–2)	Oklahoma State (6–3)	Coastal Carolina (12–2)	Arizona (15–6)	Nebraska (10–7)	San Diego (21–10)	Tulane (22–8)	Oklahoma (23–11)	Tulane (27–11)	NC State (27–14)	College of Charleston (34–10)	Missouri (33–13)	Mississippi State (32–16)	Louisiana–Lafayette (40–14)	Louisiana–Lafayette (43–15)	Louisville (44–21)	Charlotte (49–12)	Charlotte (49–12)	24.
25.	Tennessee	Long Beach State (4–2)	Kentucky (3–0)	NC State (8–1)	Arizona (13–5)	Miami (FL) (10–9)	Alabama (15–8)	Alabama (17–10)	Ohio State (17–4)	San Diego (26–12) т	Louisiana–Lafayette (28–9)	College of Charleston (31–10) т	Charlotte (34–9)	Cal State Fullerton (28–18)	TCU (40–11)	Creighton (40–13)	Oregon State (38–17)	Charlotte (49–12)	Missouri (42–18)	Missouri (42–18)	25.
26.	Baylor	Kentucky (0–0)	Long Beach State (5–4)	Coastal Carolina (9–1)	Southern Miss (10–2)	Southern Miss (12–4)	Miami (FL) (14–10)	Nebraska (13–9)	Mississippi State (18–7)	Charlotte (26–5) т	Oklahoma (25–13)	East Carolina (28–12) т	Michigan (30–8)	Michigan (34–10)	Pepperdine (32–19)	Pepperdine (35–20)	Pepperdine (35–20)	Long Beach State (39–20)	UCLA (33–28)	UCLA (33–28)	26.
27.	Kentucky	UCLA (2–4)	UCLA (6–4)	Tulane (5–4)	NC State (10–3)	East Carolina (11–6)	San Diego (19–9)	NC State (18–8)	Louisiana–Lafayette (23–6)	UC Irvine (23–8–1)	Kentucky (26–9–1) т	Oklahoma (27–15)	NC State (29–16)	College of Charleston (36–12)	Creighton (37–12)	NC State (36–19)	UC Riverside (37–19)	Louisiana–Lafayette (45–17)	Long Beach State (39–20)	Long Beach State (39–20)	27.
28.	Alabama	Stanford (2–3)	Florida Atlantic (9–0)	Florida Atlantic (10–2)	Tulane (9–4)	Kansas State (14–2)	Southern Miss (15–6)	Missouri (20–6)	San Diego (23–12)	Tulane (24–10)	UC Irvine (25–10–1) т	Long Beach State (23–14)	Missouri (31–12)	NC State (31–16)	Louisiana–Lafayette (38–13)	UC Riverside (36–17)	East Carolina (39–21)	TCU (48–14)	TCU (48–14)	TCU (48–14)	28.
29.	Evansville	LSU (3–0)	NC State (5–0)	Louisiana–Lafayette (8–0)	Georgia Tech (8–6)	Florida Atlantic (15–4)	Oklahoma (17–6)	Ohio State (13–3)	Charlotte (22–5)	Ohio State (18–5)	Long Beach State (21–12)	Michigan (26–8)	TCU (34–10)	TCU (37–11)	East Carolina (35–17)	Cal State Fullerton (32–21)	NC State (37–21)	UCLA (33–26)	Louisiana–Lafayette (45–17)	Louisiana–Lafayette (45–17)	29.
30.	Oklahoma	Tennessee (2–4)	Coastal Carolina (7–0)	Texas A&M (11–1)	College of Charleston (11–1)	College of Charleston (13–3)	NC State (16–7)	Southern Miss (17–8)	UC Irvine (21–7–1)	Stetson (27–9)	Stetson (30–9)	Stetson (32–11)	Minnesota (30–8)	East Carolina (32–15)	NC State (33–18)	Miami (FL) (35–20)	Oral Roberts (40–15)	Creighton (45–16)	Creighton (45–16)	Creighton (45–16)	30.
	Preseason Jan 10	Week 2 Feb 12	Week 3 Feb 19	Week 4 Feb 26	Week 5 Mar 5	Week 6 Mar 12	Week 7 Mar 19	Week 8 Mar 26	Week 9 Apr 2	Week 10 Apr 9	Week 11 Apr 16	Week 12 Apr 23	Week 13 Apr 30	Week 14 May 7	Week 15 May 14	Week 16 May 21	Week 17 May 28	Week 18 June 5	Week 19 June 12	Final June 25	
		Dropped: 19 Georgia; 26 Baylor; 29 Evansville; 30 Oklahoma	Dropped: 28 Stanford; 29 LSU; 30 Tennessee	Dropped: 18 TCU; 22 Winthrop; 27 UCLA	Dropped: 28 Florida Atlantic; 29 Louisiana–Lafayette	Dropped: 27 NC State; 28 Tulane; 29 Georgia Tech	Dropped: 28 Kansas State; 29 Florida Atlantic; 30 College of Charleston	Dropped: 22 Auburn; 26 Miami (FL)	Dropped: 22 Long Beach State; 25 Alabama; 26 Nebraska; 28 Missouri; 30 Southern Miss	Dropped: 22 East Carolina	Dropped: 29 Ohio State	Dropped: 24 Tulane; 25 Louisiana–Lafayette; 27 Kentucky	Dropped: 25 East Carolina; 27 Oklahoma; 30 Stetson	Dropped: 30 Minnesota	Dropped: 26 Michigan; 27 College of Charleston	Dropped: 24 Mississippi State; 29 East Carolina	Dropped: 29 Cal State Fullerton; 30 Miami (FL)	Dropped: 26 Pepperdine; 27 UC Riverside; 28 East Carolina; 29 NC State; 30 Oral Roberts	None	None	

The Preseason Poll ranked the top 35 teams. Remaining teams not listed above were: 31. Winthrop 32. Southern California 33. Oral Roberts 34. LSU 35. Mississippi State
