= 2007 Oregon State Beavers baseball team =

American college baseball season

2007 Oregon State Beavers baseball

College World Series champions
- Conference: Pac-10 Conference
- Record: 49–18 (10–14 Pac-10)
- Head coach: Pat Casey (13th season)
- Assistant coach: Marty Lees (4th season)
- Pitching coach: Dan Spencer (11th season)
- Home stadium: Goss Stadium

2007 Pacific-10 Conference baseball standings
	Conf.				Overall
Team	W		L	PCT	W		L	PCT
No. 5 Arizona State ‍†‍‍^{y}	19	–	5	.792	49	–	15	.766
No. 22 Arizona ‍‍‍^{y}	15	–	9	.625	42	–	17	.712
No. 23 UCLA ‍‍‍^{y}	14	–	10	.583	33	–	28	.541
California ‍‍‍	12	–	12	.500	29	–	26	.527
Washington ‍‍‍	11	–	13	.458	29	–	27	.518
No. 1 Oregon State ‍‍‍^{y}	10	–	14	.417	49	–	18	.731
Washington State ‍‍‍	10	–	14	.417	28	–	26	.519
Stanford ‍‍‍	9	–	15	.375	28	–	28	.500
Southern California ‍‍‍	8	–	16	.333	27	–	29	.482
† – Conference champion y – Invited to the NCAA tournament As of June 30, 2007; Rankings from Collegiate Baseball

The 2007 Oregon State Beavers baseball team represented Oregon State University in the 2007 NCAA Division I baseball season. The Beavers played their home games at Goss Stadium. The team was coached by Pat Casey in his 13th season at Oregon State.

The Beavers won the College World Series, defeating the North Carolina Tar Heels in the championship series, for the second consecutive year.

== Roster ==
2007 Oregon State Beavers roster
Pitchers: 2 Blake Keitzman - Freshman; 4 Greg Keim - Senior; 17 Anton Maxwell - Senior; 18 Mark Grbavac - Sophomore; 19 Jake McCormick - Junior; 23 Jorge Reyes - Freshman; 24 Brian Budrow - Sophomore; 26 Joe Paterson - Junior; 28 Daniel Turpen - Junior; 31 Alex Sogard - Freshman; 32 Reed Brown - Junior; 33 Michael Stutes - Sophomore; 36 Bryn Card - Freshman; 38 Josh Keller - Sophomore; 44 Eddie Kunz - Junior	Infielders: 1 Joey Wong - Freshman; 8 Jason Ogata - Sophomore; 10 Darwin Barney - Junior; 15 Lonnie Lechelt - Junior; 29 Drew George - Junior; 37 Jordan Lennerton - Junior; 39 Dale Soloman - Freshman; Catchers: 11 Mitch Canham - Senior; 12 Erik Ammon - Junior; 21 Joe Pratt - Freshman; 27 Ryan Ortiz - Freshman	Outfielders: 3 Mike Lissman - Senior; 6 Scotty Berke - Freshman; 9 Braden Wells - Sophomore; 14 Brett Casey - Freshman; 16 Cory Ellis - Sophomore; 20 Chris Hopkins - Junior; 21 Scott Santschi - Senior; 22 Koa Kahalehoe - Sophomore; 34 Joey Lakowske - Freshman; 35 John Wallace - Sophomore

== Schedule ==
2007 Oregon State Beavers baseball game log (49–18)
Regular season (38–17)
January (4–0)

#	Date	Opponent	Rank	Site/stadium	Score	Overall record	Pac-10 record
1	January 25	at Hawaii-Hilo		Wong Stadium • Hilo, Hawaii	W 5–0	1–0	–
2	January 26	at Hawaii-Hilo		Wong Stadium • Hilo, Hawaii	W 17–4 (7)	2–0	–
3	January 26	at Hawaii-Hilo		Wong Stadium • Hilo, Hawaii	W 9–3	3–0	–
4	January 27	at Hawaii-Hilo		Wong Stadium • Hilo, Hawaii	W 10–2	4–0	–

February (7–2)

#	Date	Opponent	Rank	Site/stadium	Score	Overall record	Pac-10 record
5	February 9	at No. 21 Georgia	No. 22	Foley Field • Athens, Georgia	W 10–8	5–0	–
6	February 10	at No. 21 Georgia	No. 22	Foley Field • Athens, Georgia	W 7–3	6–0	–
7	February 11	at No. 21 Georgia	No. 22	Foley Field • Athens, Georgia	W 6–2	7–0	–
Coca-Cola Classic
8	February 16	vs. Gonzaga	No. 12	Surprise Stadium • Surprise, Arizona	L 5–6	7–1	–
9	February 17	vs. No. 11 Arizona State	No. 12	Surprise Stadium • Surprise, Arizona	W 12–4	8–1	–
10	February 18	vs. Missouri	No. 12	Surprise Stadium • Surprise, Arizona	W 9–2	9–1	–
River City Classic
11	February 23	at UC Davis	No. 9	Dobbins Baseball Complex • Davis, California	W 11–2	10–1	–
12	February 24	vs. Saint Mary's	No. 9	Dobbins Baseball Complex • Davis, California	L 1–4	10–2	–
13	February 25	at Sacramento State	No. 9	John Smith Field • Sacramento, California	W 18–5	11–2	–

March (12–3)

#	Date	Opponent	Rank	Site/stadium	Score	Overall record	Pac-10 record
Aggie Baseball Classic
14	March 2	at No. 19 Texas A&M	No. 9	Olsen Field • College Station, Texas	L 2–5	11–3	–
15	March 3	vs. New Mexico	No. 9	Olsen Field • College Station, Texas	W 6–2	12–3	–
16	March 4	vs. Saint Louis	No. 9	Olsen Field • College Station, Texas	W 2–0	13–3	–
17	March 5	at No. 9 Texas A&M	No. 7	Olsen Field • College Station, Texas	W 6–5 (8)	14–3	–
18	March 8	Evansville	No. 7	Goss Stadium at Coleman Field • Corvallis, Oregon	W 9–2	15–3	–
19	March 9	Evansville	No. 7	Goss Stadium at Coleman Field • Corvallis, Oregon	W 6–2	16–3	–
20	March 10	Evansville	No. 7	Goss Stadium at Coleman Field • Corvallis, Oregon	W 3–2	17–3	–
21	March 16	San Francisco	No. 5	Goss Stadium at Coleman Field • Corvallis, Oregon	W 11–1	18–3	–
22	March 17	San Francisco	No. 5	Goss Stadium at Coleman Field • Corvallis, Oregon	W 9–2	19–3	–
23	March 18	San Francisco	No. 5	Goss Stadium at Coleman Field • Corvallis, Oregon	W 3–2	20–3	–
24	March 24	at Cal Poly	No. 3	Robin Baggett Stadium • San Luis Obispo, California	W 6–0	21–3	–
25	March 25	at Cal Poly	No. 3	Robin Baggett Stadium • San Luis Obispo, California	W 5–2	22–3	–
26	March 26	at Cal Poly	No. 2	Robin Baggett Stadium • San Luis Obispo, California	W 13–1	23–3	–
27	March 30	at No. 23 Arizona	No. 2	Sancet Stadium • Tucson, Arizona	L 4–5	23–4	0–1
28	March 31	at No. 23 Arizona	No. 2	Sancet Stadium • Tucson, Arizona	L 2–8	23–5	0–2

April (11–4)

#	Date	Opponent	Rank	Site/stadium	Score	Overall record	Pac-10 record
29	April 1	at No. 23 Arizona	No. 2	Sancet Stadium • Tucson, Arizona	L 14–17	23–6	0–3
30	April 5	Southern California	No. 9	Goss Stadium at Coleman Field • Corvallis, Oregon	W 9–5	24–6	1–3
31	April 6	Southern California	No. 9	Goss Stadium at Coleman Field • Corvallis, Oregon	L 1–4	24–7	1–4
32	April 7	Southern California	No. 9	Goss Stadium at Coleman Field • Corvallis, Oregon	W 9–8 (11)	25–7	2–4
33	April 10	Portland	No. 9	Goss Stadium at Coleman Field • Corvallis, Oregon	W 12–4	26–7	–
34	April 13	California	No. 9	Goss Stadium at Coleman Field • Corvallis, Oregon	W 1–0	27–7	3–4
35	April 14	California	No. 9	Goss Stadium at Coleman Field • Corvallis, Oregon	L 0–4	27–8	3–5
36	April 15	California	No. 9	Goss Stadium at Coleman Field • Corvallis, Oregon	W 5–3	28–8	4–5
37	April 20	UNLV	No. 11	Goss Stadium at Coleman Field • Corvallis, Oregon	W 3–1	29–8	–
38	April 22	UNLV	No. 11	Goss Stadium at Coleman Field • Corvallis, Oregon	W 10–2	30–8	–
39	April 22	UNLV	No. 11	Goss Stadium at Coleman Field • Corvallis, Oregon	W 7–0	31–8	–
40	April 24	at Portland	No. 11	Joe Etzel Field • Portland, Oregon	W 10–1	32–8	–
41	April 27	at Stanford	No. 11	Sunken Diamond • Stanford, California	W 13–7	33–8	5–5
42	April 28	at Stanford	No. 11	Sunken Diamond • Stanford, California	L 7–9 (11)	33–9	5–6
43	April 29	at Stanford	No. 11	Sunken Diamond • Stanford, California	W 8–6	34–9	6–6

May (4–8)

#	Date	Opponent	Rank	Site/stadium	Score	Overall record	Pac-10 record
44	May 4	vs. Washington	No. 8	Safeco Field • Seattle, Washington	L 2–6	34–10	6–7
45	May 5	at Washington	No. 8	Husky Ballpark • Seattle, Washington	L 6–9	34–11	6–8
46	May 6	at Washington	No. 8	Husky Ballpark • Seattle, Washington	W 8–2	35–11	7–8
47	May 11	Washington State	No. 12	Goss Stadium at Coleman Field • Corvallis, Oregon	L 4–5	35–12	7–9
48	May 12	Washington State	No. 12	Goss Stadium at Coleman Field • Corvallis, Oregon	W 11–5	36–12	8–9
49	May 13	Washington State	No. 12	Goss Stadium at Coleman Field • Corvallis, Oregon	L 3–5	36–13	8–10
50	May 18	No. 8 Arizona State	No. 19	Goss Stadium at Coleman Field • Corvallis, Oregon	L 3–4	36–14	8–11
51	May 19	No. 8 Arizona State	No. 19	Goss Stadium at Coleman Field • Corvallis, Oregon	L 0–3	36–15	8–12
52	May 20	No. 8 Arizona State	No. 19	Goss Stadium at Coleman Field • Corvallis, Oregon	L 1–8	36–16	8–13
53	May 25	at No. 26 UCLA	No. 28	Jackie Robinson Stadium • Los Angeles, California	W 10–7	37–16	9–13
54	May 26	at No. 26 UCLA	No. 28	Jackie Robinson Stadium • Los Angeles, California	W 13–5	38–16	10–13
55	May 27	at No. 26 UCLA	No. 28	Jackie Robinson Stadium • Los Angeles, California	L 2–5	38–17	10–14

Postseason (11–1)
NCAA tournament: Charlottesville Regional (4–1)

#	Date	Opponent	Seed/Rank	Site/stadium	Score	Overall record	NCAAT record
56	June 1	vs. (2) No. 26 Rutgers	(3) No. 29	Davenport Field • Charlottesville, Virginia	W 5–1	39–17	1–0
57	June 2	at (1) No. 5 Virginia	(3) No. 29	Davenport Field • Charlottesville, Virginia	L 4–7 (13)	39–18	1–1
58	June 4	vs. (2) No. 26 Rutgers	(3) No. 29	Davenport Field • Charlottesville, Virginia	W 5–2	40–18	2–1
59	June 4	at (1) No. 5 Virginia	(3) No. 29	Davenport Field • Charlottesville, Virginia	W 5–3	41–18	3–1
60	June 5	at (1) No. 5 Virginia	(3) No. 29	Davenport Field • Charlottesville, Virginia	W 7–3	42–18	4–1

NCAA tournament: Corvallis Super Regional (2–0)

#	Date	Opponent	Seed/Rank	Site/stadium	Score	Overall record	NCAAT record
61	June 10	No. 19 Michigan	No. 11	Goss Stadium at Coleman Field • Corvallis, Oregon	W 1–0	43–18	5–1
62	June 11	No. 19 Michigan	No. 11	Goss Stadium at Coleman Field • Corvallis, Oregon	W 8–2	44–18	6–1

NCAA tournament: College World Series (5–0)

#	Date	Opponent	Seed/Rank	Site/stadium	Score	Overall record	CWS record
63	June 16	vs. No. 7 Cal State Fullerton	No. 5	Rosenblatt Stadium • Omaha, Nebraska	W 3–2	45–18	1–0
64	June 18	vs. (5) No. 3 Arizona State	No. 5	Rosenblatt Stadium • Omaha, Nebraska	W 12–6	46–18	2–0
65	June 20	vs. No. 4 UC Irvine	No. 5	Rosenblatt Stadium • Omaha, Nebraska	W 7–1	47–18	3–0
66	June 23	vs. (3) No. 2 North Carolina	No. 5	Rosenblatt Stadium • Omaha, Nebraska	W 11–4	48–18	4–0
67	June 24	vs. (3) No. 2 North Carolina	No. 5	Rosenblatt Stadium • Omaha, Nebraska	W 9–3	49–18	5–0

== Awards and honors ==
Darwin Barney

- College World Series All-Tournament Team

Mitch Canham

- College World Series All-Tournament Team
- All-America Third Team
- All-Pac-10

Mike Lissman

- College World Series All-Tournament Team

Jorge Reyes

- College World Series Most Outstanding Player

Scott Santschi

- College World Series All-Tournament Team

Joey Wong

- College World Series All-Tournament Team

== Beavers in the 2007 MLB draft ==
The following members of the Oregon State Beavers baseball program were drafted in the 2007 Major League Baseball draft.

Player	Position	Round	Overall	MLB team
Eddie Kunz	RHP	1st	42nd	New York Mets
Mitch Canham	C	1st	57th	San Diego Padres
Darwin Barney	2B	4th	127th	Chicago Cubs
Daniel Turpen	RHP	8th	254th	San Francisco Giants
Michael Stutes	RHP	9th	292nd	Philadelphia Phillies
Joe Paterson	LHP	10th	314th	San Francisco Giants
Anton Maxwell	LHP	31st	950th	Texas Rangers
Chris Hopkins	OF	44th	1297th	Kansas City Royals
