= 2007 Arizona Wildcats baseball team =

2007 Arizona Wildcats baseball

Wichita Regional
- Conference: Pacific-10 Conference
- Record: 42-17 (15-9 Pac-10)
- Head coach: Andy Lopez (6th season)
- Assistant coaches: Mark Wasikowski (6th season); Jeff Casper (6th season); Keith Francis (1st season)
- Home stadium: Sancet Stadium

2007 Pacific-10 Conference baseball standings
	Conf.				Overall
Team	W		L	PCT	W		L	PCT
No. 5 Arizona State ‍†‍‍^{y}	19	–	5	.792	49	–	15	.766
No. 22 Arizona ‍‍‍^{y}	15	–	9	.625	42	–	17	.712
No. 23 UCLA ‍‍‍^{y}	14	–	10	.583	33	–	28	.541
California ‍‍‍	12	–	12	.500	29	–	26	.527
Washington ‍‍‍	11	–	13	.458	29	–	27	.518
No. 1 Oregon State ‍‍‍^{y}	10	–	14	.417	49	–	18	.731
Washington State ‍‍‍	10	–	14	.417	28	–	26	.519
Stanford ‍‍‍	9	–	15	.375	28	–	28	.500
Southern California ‍‍‍	8	–	16	.333	27	–	29	.482
† – Conference champion y – Invited to the NCAA tournament As of June 30, 2007; Rankings from Collegiate Baseball

The 2007 Arizona Wildcats baseball team represented the University of Arizona during the 2007 NCAA Division I baseball season. The Wildcats played their home games at Jerry Kindall Field at Frank Sancet Stadium. The team was coached by Andy Lopez in his 6th season at Arizona. The Wildcats finished with a record of 42-17 (15-9 Conf.) and were selected to the NCAA tournament for the 4th time under Andy Lopez's leadership, losing in the Wichita Regional final to Wichita State.

== Previous season ==
The Wildcats finished the 2006 season with a record of 27-28 (12-12 Conf.), missing the postseason for the first time since Andy Lopez's first season in 2002 and only the second time in his tenure.

== Personnel ==
=== Roster ===
2007 Arizona Wildcats baseball roster
Pitchers • 11 - Preston Guilmet - Sophomore • 16 - Mike Colla - Sophomore • 19 - David Coulon - Junior • 25 - Daniel Schlereth - Sophomore • 26 - Jason Stoffel - Junior • 34 - Cory Burns - Sophomore • 45 - Ryan Perry - Sophomore • 46 - Brad Mills - Senior • 43 - Brett Lorin - Freshman • 47 - Lee Taylor - Sophomore • 50 - Paul Baragas - Freshman	Catchers • 5 - Dwight Childs - Freshman • 21 - Daniel Butler - RS Freshman Infielders • 1 - Travis Peep - Sophomore • 2 - Colt Sedbrook - Junior • 10 - Erik Castro - Freshman • 13 - Kevin Rodland - Freshman • 14 - Robert Abel - Freshman • 24 - Cristen Tapia - Junior • 24 - CJ Ziegler - Junior • 28 - Mike Weldon - Freshman • 33 - John Murphy - Junior • 36 - Matt Koerner - Freshman	Outfielders • 4 - Jon Gaston - Sophomore • 12 - Bill Rhinehart - Senior • 20 - Brad Glenn - Sophomore • 29 - Oliver Padre - Freshman • 35 - Hunter Pace - Sophomore • 40 - Diallo Fon - RS Freshman • 48 - TJ Steele - Sophomore

=== Coaches ===
2007 Arizona Wildcats baseball coaching staff
- Andy Lopez - Head coach
- Mark Wasikowski - Assistant coach
- Jeff Casper - Assistant coach
- Keith Francis - Volunteer Assistant Coach

=== Opening day ===
Opening Day Starters
Name	Position
Jon Gaston	Right fielder
Robert Abel	Shortstop
Bill Rhinehart	First baseman
CJ Ziegler	Designated hitter
Brad Glenn	Left fielder
TJ Steele	Center fielder
Erik Castro	Third baseman
Kevin Rodland	Second baseman
Dwight Childs	Catcher
Preston Guilmet	Starting pitcher

== Schedule and results ==
2007 Arizona Wildcats baseball game log
Regular season
Date	Opponent	Rank	Site/stadium	Score	Win/Loss	Overall Record	Pac-10 Record
Feb 2	Gonzaga		Sancet Stadium • Tucson, AZ	W 14-0	Guilmet (1-0)	1-0	
Feb 3	Gonzaga		Sancet Stadium • Tucson, AZ	W 10-3	Colla (1-0)	2-0	
Feb 4	Gonzaga		Sancet Stadium • Tucson, AZ	W 12-1	Mills (1-0)	3-0	
Feb 6	Utah Valley State	#25	Sancet Stadium • Tucson, AZ	W 4-2	Coulon (1-0)	4-0	
Feb 7	Utah Valley State	#25	Sancet Stadium • Tucson, AZ	W 13-2	Bargas (1-0)	5-0	
Feb 9	New Mexico	#25	Sancet Stadium • Tucson, AZ	W 9-6	Stoffel (1-0)	6-0	
Feb 10	New Mexico	#25	Sancet Stadium • Tucson, AZ	W 8-1	Mills (2-0)	7-0	
Feb 11	New Mexico	#25	Sancet Stadium • Tucson, AZ	W 8-3	Coulon (2-0)	8-0	
Feb 16	at #8 Cal State Fullerton	#17	Goodwin Field • Fullerton, CA	W 2-1	Guilmet (2-0)	9-0	
Feb 17	at #8 Cal State Fullerton	#17	Goodwin Field • Fullerton, CA	L 0-9	Mills (2-1)	9-1	
Feb 18	at #8 Cal State Fullerton	#17	Goodwin Field • Fullerton, CA	L 2-9	Colla (1-1)	9-2	
Feb 23	at UNLV	#17	Earl Wilson Stadium • Paradise, NV	W 6-5	Schlereth (1-0)	10-2	
Feb 24	at UNLV	#17	Earl Wilson Stadium • Paradise, NV	W 9-3	Mills (3-1)	11-2	
Feb 25	at UNLV	#17	Earl Wilson Stadium • Paradise, NV	L 6-8	Burns (0-1)	11-3	
Feb 27	#12 Arizona State	#17	Sancet Stadium • Tucson, AZ	L 8-22	Bargas (1-1)	11-4	
Mar 2	Eastern Michigan	#17	Sancet Stadium • Tucson, AZ	W 9-2	Guilmet (3-0)	12-4	
Mar 3	Eastern Michigan	#17	Sancet Stadium • Tucson, AZ	W 8-7	Mills (4-1)	13-4	
Mar 4	Eastern Michigan	#17	Sancet Stadium • Tucson, AZ	L 5-7	Coulon (2-1)	13-5	
Mar 9	at Hawaii	#24	Les Murakami Stadium • Honolulu, HI	W 2-1	Guilmet (4-0)	14-5	
Mar 10	at Hawaii	#24	Les Murakami Stadium • Honolulu, HI	L 0-4	Mills (4-2)	14-6	
Mar 11	at Hawaii	#24	Les Murakami Stadium • Honolulu, HI	W 3-1	Burns (1-1)	15-6	
Mar 13	at Hawaii-Hilo	#21	Wong Stadium • Hilo, HI	W 19-3	Colla (2-1)	16-6	
Mar 20	Morehead State	#23	Sancet Stadium • Tucson, AZ	W 5-4	Burns (2-1)	17-6	
Mar 21	Morehead State	#23	Sancet Stadium • Tucson, AZ	W 7-6	Burns (3-1)	18-6	
Mar 24	Northern Colorado	#23	Sancet Stadium • Tucson, AZ	W 12-0	Guilmet (5-0)	19-6	
Mar 24	Northern Colorado	#23	Sancet Stadium • Tucson, AZ	W 6-2	Mills (5-2)	20-6	
Mar 25	Northern Colorado	#23	Sancet Stadium • Tucson, AZ	W 7-5	Bargas (2-1)	21-6	
Mar 28	vs #10 Arizona State	#23	Chase Field • Phoenix, AZ	W 6-5	Stoffel (2-0)	22-6	
Mar 30	#2 Oregon State	#23	Goss Stadium • Corvallis, OR	W 5-4	Guilmet (6-0)	23-6	1-0
Mar 31	#2 Oregon State	#23	Goss Stadium • Corvallis, OR	W 8-2	Mills (6-2)	24-6	2-0
Apr 1	#2 Oregon State	#23	Goss Stadium • Corvallis, OR	W 17-14	Bargas (3-1)	25-6	3-0
Apr 5	California	#15	Sancet Stadium • Tucson, AZ	W 1-0	Stoffel (3-0)	26-6	4-0
Apr 6	California	#15	Sancet Stadium • Tucson, AZ	W 15-12	Mills (7-2)	27-6	5-0
Apr 7	California	#15	Sancet Stadium • Tucson, AZ	W 5-3	Coulon (3-1)	28-6	6-0
Apr 13	at Stanford	#8	Sunken Diamond • Palo Alto, CA	W 8-1	Guilmet (7-0)	29-6	7-0
Apr 14	at Stanford	#8	Sunken Diamond • Palo Alto, CA	W 15-1	Mills (8-2)	30-6	8-0
Apr 15	at Stanford	#8	Sunken Diamond • Palo Alto, CA	L 3-6	Perry (0-1)	30-7	8-1
Apr 20	at Washington State	#7	Bailey-Brayton Field • Pullman, WA	W 3-1	Guilmet (8-0)	31-7	9-1
Apr 21	at Washington State	#7	Bailey-Brayton Field • Pullman, WA	L 3-4	Mills (8-3)	31-8	9-2
Apr 22	at Washington State	#7	Bailey-Brayton Field • Pullman, WA	L 3-5	Coulon (3-2)	31-9	9-3
Apr 27	at #18 UCLA	#12	Jackie Robinson Stadium • Los Angeles, CA	L 3-9	Guilmet (8-1)	31-10	9-4
Apr 28	at #18 UCLA	#12	Jackie Robinson Stadium • Los Angeles, CA	L 4-11	Mills (8-4)	31-11	9-5
Apr 29	at #18 UCLA	#12	Jackie Robinson Stadium • Los Angeles, CA	W 5-3	Stoffel (4-0)	32-11	10-5
May 4	Liberty	#18	Sancet Stadium • Tucson, AZ	W 16-2	Guilmet (9-1)	33-11	
May 5	Liberty	#18	Sancet Stadium • Tucson, AZ	W 16-3	Mills (9-4)	34-11	
May 6	Liberty	#18	Sancet Stadium • Tucson, AZ	W 7-6	Schlereth (2-0)	35-11	
May 12	USC	#15	Sancet Stadium • Tucson, AZ	W 5-2	Guilmet (10-1)	36-11	11-5
May 13	USC	#15	Sancet Stadium • Tucson, AZ	L 5-7	Coulon (3-3)	36-12	11-6
May 14	USC	#13	Sancet Stadium • Tucson, AZ	L 2-4	Colla (2-2)	36-13	11-7
May 18	Washington	#13	Sancet Stadium • Tucson, AZ	W 7-0	Guilmet (11-1)	37-13	12-7
May 19	Washington	#13	Sancet Stadium • Tucson, AZ	W 13-4	Coulon (4-3)	38-13	13-7
May 20	Washington	#13	Sancet Stadium • Tucson, AZ	W 17-8	Colla (3-2)	39-13	14-7
May 23	at #6 Arizona State	#11	Packard Stadium • Tempe, AZ	L 5-8	Perry (0-2)	39-14	14-8
May 24	at #6 Arizona State	#11	Packard Stadium • Tempe, AZ	L 7-8	Guilmet (11-2)	39-15	14-9
May 25	at #6 Arizona State	#11	Packard Stadium • Tempe, AZ	W 14-5	Stoffel (5-0)	40-15	15-9
NCAA Wichita Regional
Jun 1	vs (3) #24 Oral Roberts	(2) #11	Eck Stadium • Wichita, KS	W 4-3	Guilmet (12-2)	41-15	
Jun 2	vs (4) New Orleans	(2) #11	Eck Stadium • Wichita, KS	W 9-8	Schlereth (3-0)	42-15	
Jun 3	vs (1) #17 Wichita State	(2) #11	Eck Stadium • Wichita, KS	L 3-4	Schlereth (3-1)	42-16	
Jun 4	vs (1) #17 Wichita State	(2) #11	Eck Stadium • Wichita, KS	L 0-3	Colla (3-3)	42-17	

=== Wichita Regional ===
Wichita Regional Teams
(1) Wichita State Shockers	(4) New Orleans Privateers	(2) Arizona Wildcats	(3) Oral Roberts Golden Eagles

== 2007 MLB draft ==
Player	Position	Round	Overall	MLB team
Brad Mills	LHP	4	145	Toronto Blue Jays
Daniel Schlereth	LHP	8	270	Oakland Athletics
Eric Berger	LHP	9	300	Oakland Athletics
Bill Rhinehart	OF	11	340	Washington Nationals
C.J. Ziegler	1B	37	1125	St. Louis Cardinals
Colt Sedbrook	INF	42	1246	Chicago Cubs
David Coulon	LHP	42	1251	Colorado Rockies
