= 2007 North Carolina Tar Heels baseball team =

American college baseball season

2007 North Carolina Tar Heels baseball

ACC Regular season Champion ACC Tournament champion Chapel Hill Regional Champion Chapel Hill Super Regional Champion

College World Series Finals vs. Oregon State
- Conference: Atlantic Coast Conference
- Record: 56-14 (21–9 ACC)
- Head coach: Mike Fox (7th season)
- Home stadium: Bryson Field at Boshamer Stadium

2007 Atlantic Coast Conference baseball standings
	Conf.				Overall
Team	W		L	PCT	W		L	PCT
Atlantic
No. 10 Florida State ^{x}‍‍‍^{y}	24	–	6	.800	49	–	13	.790
No. 12 Clemson ‍‍‍^{y}	18	–	12	.600	41	–	23	.641
NC State ‍‍‍^{y}	16	–	14	.533	38	–	23	.623
Wake Forest ‍‍‍^{y}	14	–	16	.467	34	–	29	.540
Boston College ‍‍‍	12	–	17	.414	24	–	27	.471
Maryland ‍‍‍	7	–	23	.233	26	–	30	.464
Coastal
No. 2 North Carolina ^{x‡y} ‍‍‍	21	–	9	.700	57	–	16	.781
No. 15 Virginia ‍‍‍^{y}	19	–	9	.679	45	–	16	.738
Miami (FL) ‍‍‍^{y}	17	–	13	.567	37	–	24	.607
Georgia Tech ‍‍‍	15	–	14	.517	32	–	25	.561
Duke ‍‍‍	8	–	22	.267	29	–	25	.537
Virginia Tech ‍‍‍	7	–	23	.233	23	–	31	.426
x – Division champion ‡ – Tournament champion y – Invited to the NCAA tournament As of June 30, 2007; Rankings from Collegiate Baseball

The 2007 North Carolina Tar Heels baseball team represented the University of North Carolina at Chapel Hill in the 2007 NCAA Division I baseball season. They play their home games at Bryson Field at Boshamer Stadium and are members of the Atlantic Coast Conference.

The Tar Heels won the ACC tournament title. They made the 2007 NCAA Division I baseball tournament as the third-overall seed, and advanced to the 2007 College World Series, finishing as the national runner-up.

== Roster ==
North Carolina Tar Heels 2007 baseball roster
Players		Coaches
Pitchers: #6 Alex White; #8 Andrew Carignan; #15 Rob Catapano; #17 Matt Danford; #18 Mike Facchinei; #20 Robert Woodard; #23 Jared Bard; #25 Colin Bates; #28 Adam Warren; #29 Brian Farrell; #31 Matt Cox; #32 Bryant Gaines; #35 Rob Wooten; #39 Luke Putkonen; #40 Tyler Trice; #42 B.J. Dail; #43 Matt Petiton; #45 Hunter Rome; #46 Brian Moran; Catchers: #19 Tim Federowicz; #26 Benji Johnson; #38 Mike McKee; #41 Mark Fleury	Infielders: #1 Kyle Shelton; #3 Bryan Steed; #4 Garrett Gore; #10 Kyle Seager; #12 Josh Horton; #14 Joe Pietropaoli; #24 Ryan Graepel; #34 Chad Flack; Outfielders: #5 Matt McNichol; #7 Reid Fronk; #11 Mike Cavasinni; #13 Dustin Ackley; #16 Tim Fedroff; #27 Seth Williams; #33 Kendric Burney; #44 Drew Poulk	Coaches: #30 - Mike Fox (Head Coach); #21 - Scott Forbes (Assistant Coach/ Pitching Coach); #2 - Chad Holbrook (Assistant Coach/ Recruiting Coordinator); #37- Jason Howell

== See also ==
- North Carolina Tar Heels
- 2007 NCAA Division I baseball season
