= 2007 Arizona State Sun Devils baseball team =

American college baseball season

2007 Arizona State Sun Devils baseball

NCAA Tempe Regional champions NCAA Tempe Super Regional champions

College World Series, 1–2
- Conference: Pacific-10 Conference
- Record: 49–15 (19–5 Pac-10)
- Head coach: Pat Murphy (13th year)
- Home stadium: Packard Stadium

2007 Pacific-10 Conference baseball standings
| | Conf. | | | | Overall |
| Team | W | | L | PCT | W | | L | PCT |
|---|---|---|---|---|---|---|---|---|
| No. 5 Arizona State ‍†‍‍^{y} | 19 | – | 5 | .792 | 49 | – | 15 | .766 |
| No. 22 Arizona ‍‍‍^{y} | 15 | – | 9 | .625 | 42 | – | 17 | .712 |
| No. 23 UCLA ‍‍‍^{y} | 14 | – | 10 | .583 | 33 | – | 28 | .541 |
| California ‍‍‍ | 12 | – | 12 | .500 | 29 | – | 26 | .527 |
| Washington ‍‍‍ | 11 | – | 13 | .458 | 29 | – | 27 | .518 |
| No. 1 Oregon State ‍‍‍^{y} | 10 | – | 14 | .417 | 49 | – | 18 | .731 |
| Washington State ‍‍‍ | 10 | – | 14 | .417 | 28 | – | 26 | .519 |
| Stanford ‍‍‍ | 9 | – | 15 | .375 | 28 | – | 28 | .500 |
| Southern California ‍‍‍ | 8 | – | 16 | .333 | 27 | – | 29 | .482 |
† – Conference champion y – Invited to the NCAA tournament As of June 30, 2007; Rankings from Collegiate Baseball

The 2007 Arizona State Sun Devils baseball team represented Arizona State University in the 2007 NCAA Division I baseball season. The Sun Devils played their home games at Packard Stadium, and played as part of the Pacific-10 Conference. The team was coached by Pat Murphy in his thirteenth season as head coach at Arizona State.

The Sun Devils reached the College World Series, their twentieth appearance in Omaha, where they finished tied for fifth place after recording a win against UC Irvine and losing two eventual champion Oregon State and UC Irvine.

On December 15, 2010, Arizona State vacated 44 wins, their Pac-12 title, and postseason appearance due to recruiting violations. Arizona State was banned from the 2011 postseason as well.

== Personnel ==
=== Roster ===
2007 Arizona State Sun Devils roster
| Pitchers: - Brian Flores - Junior; - Jason Jarvis - Freshman; - Mike Leake - Freshman; Catchers: - Preston Paramore - Sophomore; - Kiel Roling - Sophomore; Outfielders: - DJ Butler - Junior; - Ike Davis - Sophomore; - Rocky Laguna - Junior; - J.J. Sferra - Junior; - Eric Williams - Junior | Infielders: - Greg Bordes - Junior; - Willy Fox - Junior; - Matt Hall - Sophomore; - Jeff Landry - Junior; - Joe Persichina - Senior; - Andrew Romine - Junior; - Eric Sogard - Junior; - Brett Wallace - Sophomore | Others: - Ted Aust - Freshman; - Adam Bailey - Freshman; - Jarred Bogany - Freshman; - Dustin Brader - Freshman; - Brett Bruneel - Sophomore; - Brett Davis - Freshman; - Seth Garrison - Junior; - Joe Hatasaki - Freshman; - Tyler Hoechlin - Freshman; - Mike Jones - Freshman; - Brady Martinez - Sophomore; - Frank Mesa - Sophomore; - Jason Mitchell - Freshman; - Scott Mueller - Freshman; - Joey Parigi - Freshman; - Cody Pike - Junior; - CJ Retherford - Sophomore; - Josh Satow - Junior; - Tim Smith - Freshman; - Ryan Sontag - Sophomore; - Matt Spencer - Freshman; - Raoul Torrez - Freshman; - Matt Trink - Sophomore; - Jeff Urlaub - Sophomore |

=== Coaches ===
2007 Arizona State Sun Devils baseball coaching staff
- Pat Murphy - Head coach - 13th year

== Schedule and results ==
Legend
| Arizona State win |
| Arizona State loss |

2007 Arizona State Sun Devils baseball game log
Regular season

January/February
| Date | Opponent | Rank | Site/stadium | Score | Overall record | Pac-10 record |
|---|---|---|---|---|---|---|
| Feb 2 | Southern Utah* | No. 14 | Packard Stadium • Tempe, AZ | W 20–1 | 1–0 | |
| Feb 3 | Southern Utah* | No. 14 | Packard Stadium • Tempe, AZ | W 18–4 | 2–0 | |
| Feb 4 | Southern Utah* | No. 14 | Packard Stadium • Tempe, AZ | W 23–3 | 3–0 | |
| Feb 9 | vs Texas A&M* | No. 12 | Minute Maid Park • Houston, TX (Minute Maid Classic) | W 5–4 | 4–0 | |
| Feb 10 | vs No. 6 Vanderbilt* | No. 12 | Minute Maid Park • Houston, TX; Minute Maid Classic | L 6–7^{10} | 4–1 | |
| Feb 11 | vs Houston* | No. 12 | Minute Maid Park • Houston, TX; Minute Maid Classic | W 11–1 | 5–1 | |
| Feb 15 | Missouri* | No. 11 | Packard Stadium • Tempe, AZ | W 7–1 | 6–1 | |
| Feb 16 | vs Missouri* | No. 11 | Surprise Stadium • Surprise, AZ (Coca-Cola Classic) | L 2–3 | 6–2 | |
| Feb 17 | vs No. 12 Oregon State* | No. 11 | Surprise Stadium • Surprise, AZ (Coca-Cola Classic) | L 4–12 | 6–3 | |
| Feb 18 | vs Gonzaga* | No. 11 | Surprise Stadium • Surprise, AZ (Coca-Cola Classic) | W 9–2 | 7–3 | |
| Feb 23 | UAB* | No. 14 | Packard Stadium • Tempe, AZ | W 11–3 | 8–3 | |
| Feb 24 | UAB* | No. 14 | Packard Stadium • Tempe, AZ | W 13–2 | 9–3 | |
| Feb 25 | UAB* | No. 14 | Packard Stadium • Tempe, AZ | W 12–5 | 10–3 | |
| Feb 27 | at No. 17 Arizona* | No. 12 | Jerry Kindall Field at Frank Sancet Stadium • Tucson, AZ | W 22–8 | 11–3 | |

March
| Date | Opponent | Rank | Site/stadium | Score | Overall record | Pac-10 record |
|---|---|---|---|---|---|---|
| Mar 2 | at No. 24 Auburn* | No. 12 | Plainsman Park • Aurbun, AL | W 8–2 | 12–3 | |
| Mar 3 | at No. 24 Auburn* | No. 12 | Plainsman Park • Auburn, AL | L 8–11 | 12–4 | |
| Mar 4 | at No. 24 Auburn* | No. 12 | Plainsman Park • Auburn, AL | L 6–7 | 12–5 | |
| Mar 9 | No. 20 Long Beach State* | No. 14 | Packard Stadium • Tempe, AZ | W 7–6 | 13–5 | |
| Mar 10 | No. 20 Long Beach State* | No. 14 | Packard Stadium • Tempe, AZ | L 7–8 | 13–6 | |
| Mar 11 | No. 20 Long Beach State* | No. 14 | Packard Stadium • Tempe, AZ | L 9–16 | 13–7 | |
| Mar 13 | Kansas State* | No. 18 | Packard Stadium • Tempe, AZ | W 9–6 | 14–7 | |
| Mar 14 | Kansas State* | No. 18 | Packard Stadium • Tempe, AZ | W 6–2 | 15–7 | |
| Mar 16 | Maine* | No. 18 | Packard Stadium • Tempe, AZ | W 12–3 | 16–7 | |
| Mar 17 | Maine* | No. 18 | Packard Stadium • Tempe, AZ | W 12–1 | 17–7 | |
| Mar 17 | Maine* | No. 18 | Packard Stadium • Tempe, AZ | W 23–2 | 18–7 | |
| Mar 18 | Maine* | No. 18 | Packard Stadium • Tempe, AZ | W 11–5 | 19–7 | |
| Mar 23 | at No. 19 Southern California | No. 14 | Dedeaux Field • Los Angeles, CA | W 10–0 | 20–7 | 1–0 |
| Mar 24 | at No. 19 Southern California | No. 14 | Dedeaux Field • Los Angeles, CA | W 4–3 | 21–7 | 2–0 |
| Mar 25 | at No. 19 Southern California | No. 14 | Dedeaux Field • Los Angeles, CA | L 13–14 | 21–8 | 2–1 |
| Mar 28 | vs No. 23 Arizona* | No. 10 | Chase Field • Phoenix, AZ | L 5–6 | 21–9 | |
| Mar 30 | at Washington | No. 10 | Husky Ballpark • Seattle, WA | L 4–5 | 21–10 | 2–2 |
| Mar 31 | at Washington | No. 10 | Husky Ballpark • Seattle, WA | W 11–5 | 22–10 | 3–2 |

April
| Date | Opponent | Rank | Site/stadium | Score | Overall record | Pac-10 record |
|---|---|---|---|---|---|---|
| Apr 1 | at Washington | No. 10 | Husky Ballpark • Seattle, WA | W 8–5 | 23–10 | 4–2 |
| Apr 5 | Stanford | No. 12 | Packard Stadium • Tempe, AZ | W 5–4 | 24–10 | 5–2 |
| Apr 6 | Stanford | No. 12 | Packard Stadium • Tempe, AZ | W 12–8 | 25–10 | 6–2 |
| Apr 7 | Stanford | No. 12 | Packard Stadium • Tempe, AZ | W 14–1 | 26–10 | 7–2 |
| Apr 13 | Washington State | No. 10 | Packard Stadium • Tempe, AZ | W 8–3 | 27–10 | 8–2 |
| Apr 14 | Washington State | No. 10 | Packard Stadium • Tempe, AZ | W 4–3 | 28–10 | 9–2 |
| Apr 15 | Washington State | No. 10 | Packard Stadium • Tempe, AZ | W 16–6 | 29–10 | 10–2 |
| Apr 20 | Louisiana–Lafayette* | No. 9 | Packard Stadium • Tempe, AZ | W 8–2 | 30–10 | |
| Apr 21 | Louisiana–Lafayette* | No. 9 | Packard Stadium • Tempe, AZ | W 11–8 | 31–10 | |
| Apr 22 | Louisiana–Lafayette* | No. 9 | Packard Stadium • Tempe, AZ | W 9–6 | 32–10 | |
| Apr 25 | Hawaii | No. 6 | Packard Stadium • Tempe, AZ | W 9–2 | 33–10 | |
| Apr 27 | at California | No. 6 | Evans Diamond • Berkeley, CA | L 2–4 | 33–11 | 10–3 |
| Apr 28 | at California | No. 6 | Evans Diamond • Berkeley, CA | W 15–2 | 34–11 | 11–3 |
| Apr 29 | at California | No. 6 | Evans Diamond • Berkeley, CA | L 9–13 | 34–12 | 11–4 |

May
| Date | Opponent | Rank | Site/stadium | Score | Overall record | Pac-10 record |
|---|---|---|---|---|---|---|
| May 11 | No. 10 UCLA | No. 11 | Packard Stadium • Tempe, AZ | W 16–14 | 35–12 | 12–4 |
| May 12 | No. 10 UCLA | No. 11 | Packard Stadium • Tempe, AZ | W 5–4 | 36–12 | 13–4 |
| May 13 | No. 10 UCLA | No. 11 | Packard Stadium • Tempe, AZ | W 11–10 | 37–12 | 14–4 |
| May 16 | Utah Valley State* | No. 8 | Packard Stadium • Tempe, AZ | W 11–3 | 38–12 | |
| May 18 | at No. 19 Oregon State | No. 8 | Goss Stadium • Corvallis, OR | W 4–3 | 39–12 | 15–4 |
| May 19 | at No. 19 Oregon State | No. 8 | Goss Stadium • Corvallis, OR | W 3–0 | 40–12 | 16–4 |
| May 20 | at No. 19 Oregon State | No. 8 | Goss Stadium • Corvallis, OR | W 8–1 | 41–12 | 17–4 |
| May 23 | No. 11 Arizona | No. 8 | Packard Stadium • Tempe, AZ | W 8–5 | 42–12 | 18–4 |
| May 24 | No. 11 Arizona | No. 8 | Packard Stadium • Tempe, AZ | W 8–7 | 43–12 | 19–4 |
| May 25 | No. 11 Arizona | No. 8 | Packard Stadium • Tempe, AZ | L 5–14 | 43–13 | 19–5 |

Postseason

NCAA Tempe Regional
| Date | Opponent | Seed | Site/stadium | Score | Overall record | Reg Record |
|---|---|---|---|---|---|---|
| June 1 | (4) Monmouth | No. 8 (1) | Packard Stadium • Tempe, AZ | W 5–3 | 44–13 | 1–0 |
| June 2 | No. 14 (2) UC Riverside | No. 8 (1) | Packard Stadium • Tempe, AZ | W 9–2 | 45–13 | 2–0 |
| June 3 | (3) Nebraska | No. 8 (1) | Packard Stadium • Tempe, AZ | W 19–7 | 46–13 | 3–0 |

NCAA Tempe Super Regional
| Date | Opponent | Seed | Site/stadium | Score | Overall record | SR Record |
|---|---|---|---|---|---|---|
| June 9 | No. 16 Ole Miss | No. 3 (5) | Packard Stadium • Tempe, AZ | W 4–3 | 47–13 | 1–0 |
| June 10 | No. 16 Ole Miss | No. 3 (5) | Packard Stadium • Tempe, AZ | W 7–1 | 48–13 | 2–0 |

College World Series
| Date | Opponent | Seed | Site/stadium | Score | Overall record | CWS record |
|---|---|---|---|---|---|---|
| June 16 | No. 4 UC Irvine | No. 3 (5) | Johnny Rosenblatt Stadium • Omaha, NE | W 5–4 | 49–13 | 1–0 |
| June 18 | No. 5 Oregon State | No. 3 (5) | Johnny Rosenblatt Stadium • Omaha, NE | L 6–12 | 49–14 | 1–1 |
| June 19 | No. 4 UC Irvine | No. 3 (5) | Johnny Rosenblatt Stadium • Omaha, NE | L 7–8 | 49–15 | 1–2 |
