= 2007 NCAA Division I baseball tournament =

- Season: 2007
- Teams: 64
- Finals site: Johnny Rosenblatt Stadium; Omaha, NE
- Champions: Oregon State (2nd title)
- Runner-up: North Carolina (6th CWS Appearance)
- Winning coach: Pat Casey (2nd title)
- MOP: Jorge Reyes (Oregon State)

The 2007 NCAA Division I baseball tournament was held from June 1 to 24, 2007. Sixty-four NCAA Division I college baseball teams advanced to the post season tournament after having played through a regular season, and for some, a conference tournament.

The 2007 tournament culminated with 8 teams advancing to the College World Series at historic Rosenblatt Stadium in Omaha, Nebraska, on June 15. Unseeded Oregon State repeated as national champions, winning all five of its games in the 2007 CWS.

Oregon State went undefeated through the College World Series, posting a 5–0 record. The Beavers, led by head coach Pat Casey, won all three games in their four-team bracket and then, for the second straight season, defeated North Carolina in the best-of-three championship series— this time in two games. Oregon State became the fifth team to win consecutive NCAA titles (last done by LSU in 1996-97), and were the first team to win four games in a CWS by six or more runs. As of 2019, 2007 Oregon State remains the only team to have ever won at least four games by six or more runs in the same College World Series. Their opener against Cal State Fullerton was a tight 3–2 victory, but OSU's last four games in the CWS were not close, impressive for a team seeded in the lower half of the 64-team tournament.

The Beavers also became the first team to win the CWS after having posted a losing conference record. Oregon State was a disappointing 10–14 (.417) in the Pac-10, placing sixth among the nine baseball-playing schools (Oregon dropped baseball in 1981, but revived it in 2009.)

However, the Beavers' non-conference record during the regular season was an impressive 28–3 (.903), and as defending NCAA champions, just enough to gain a berth in the 64-team tournament. They were placed as a No. 3 seed in one of the 16 four-team regionals, in Charlottesville, Virginia. Oregon State responded by going 11–1 (.917) in the post season. Oregon State won their final 10 games to finish at 49–18 (.731) overall. The Beavers trailed in only one inning of 2007 CWS: the first inning of the final game. Their only loss in the post season came during the second game of regionals, where they fell in 13 innings to host Virginia.

Oregon State freshman pitcher Jorge Reyes (of Warden, Washington) was named the Most Outstanding Player of the 2007 CWS. Reyes was 2–0 as a starter, defeating Cal State Fullerton in the opener and North Carolina in the first game of the finals.

Two elite programs from Louisiana, LSU and Tulane, both failed to qualify for the field of 64, marking the first time since 1984 both stayed home. LSU, which also failed to qualify the previous year, reached the College World Series 13 times between 1986 and 2004, winning five national championships (1991, 1993, 1996, 1997, 2000), while Tulane made trips to the CWS in 2001 and 2005. This was the Green Wave's first absence from the tournament since 1997; meanwhile, the Tigers went 29-26-1 under first year coach Paul Mainieri, their poorest season since going 26-25 in 1982.

== Bids ==
=== Automatic bids ===
Conference champions from 30 Division I conferences earned automatic bids to regionals. The remaining 34 spots were awarded to schools as at-large invitees.

Conference	School	Record	Berth type
America East	Albany	29–27	Tournament champion
ACC	North Carolina	48–12	Tournament champion
Atlantic Sun	Jacksonville	34–26	Tournament champion
A-10	Charlotte	47–10	Tournament champion
Big East	Rutgers	38–19	Tournament champion
Big South	Coastal Carolina	48–11	Tournament champion
Big Ten	Ohio State	37–22	Tournament champion
Big 12	Texas A&M	44–16	Tournament champion
Big West	UC Riverside	37–19	Regular-season champion
CAA	VCU	37–21	Tournament champion
Conference USA	Rice	49–12	Tournament champion
Horizon League	UIC	34–19	Tournament champion
Ivy League	Brown	27–19	Championship series winner
MAAC	Le Moyne	34–17	Tournament champion
MAC	Kent State	33–24	Tournament champion
Mid-Con	Oral Roberts	40–15	Tournament champion
MEAC	Bethune-Cookman	33–25	Tournament champion
Missouri Valley	Creighton	44–14	Tournament champion
MWC	TCU	46–12	Tournament champion
NEC	Monmouth	36–22	Tournament champion
OVC	Austin Peay	39–20	Tournament champion
Pac-10	Arizona State	43–13	Regular-season champion
Patriot League	Lafayette	33–18	Tournament champion
SEC	Vanderbilt	46–10	Tournament champion
SoCon	Wofford	30–31	Tournament champion
Southland	Sam Houston State	38–22	Tournament champion
SWAC	Prairie View A&M	34–23	Tournament champion
Sun Belt	New Orleans	37–24	Tournament champion
WCC	San Diego	43–16	Championship series winner
WAC	Fresno State	36–27	Tournament champion

=== Bids by conference ===
Conference	Total	Schools
Atlantic Coast	7	Clemson, Florida State, Miami (FL), North Carolina, NC State, Virginia, Wake Forest
Big 12	6	Baylor, Missouri, Nebraska, Oklahoma State, Texas, Texas A&M
Southeastern	5	Arkansas, Ole Miss, Mississippi State, South Carolina, Vanderbilt
Big West	4	UC Irvine, UC Riverside, Cal State Fullerton, Long Beach State
Conference USA	4	East Carolina, Memphis, Rice, Southern Miss
Pacific-10	4	Arizona, Arizona State, Oregon State, UCLA
Big East	3	Louisville, Rutgers, St. John's
Big Ten	3	Michigan, Minnesota, Ohio State
Sun Belt	3	Louisiana–Lafayette, New Orleans, Troy
Atlantic Sun	2	Jacksonville, Stetson
Missouri Valley	2	Creighton, Wichita State
Southern	2	Western Carolina, Wofford
WCC	2	Pepperdine, San Diego
Atlantic 10	1	Charlotte
America East	1	Albany
Big South	1	Coastal Carolina
Colonial	1	VCU
Horizon	1	UIC
Ivy	1	Brown
Metro Atlantic	1	Le Moyne
Mid-American	1	Kent State
Mid-Con	1	Oral Roberts
Mid-Eastern	1	Bethune-Cookman
Mountain West	1	TCU
Northeast	1	Monmouth
Ohio Valley	1	Austin Peay
Patriot	1	Lafayette
Southland	1	Sam Houston State
Southwestern	1	Prairie View
Western Athletic	1	Fresno State

== National seeds ==
Bold indicates CWS participant.

1. Vanderbilt
2. **Rice**
3. **North Carolina**
4. Texas
5. **Arizona State**
6. Florida State
7. Arkansas
8. San Diego

== Regionals and super regionals ==
=== Schedule ===
Regional rounds were held Friday, June 1, through Monday, June 4. Each regional followed a similar format, with two games played on Friday, Saturday, and Sunday, and one on Monday if needed (many regionals in the southern U.S. had their schedules adversely affected by rain)

Day	Game	Teams
Fri. 6/1/07	1	2/3 or 1/4 (host choice)
Fri. 6/1/07	2	2/3 or 1/4 (host choice)
Sat. 6/2/07	3	Loser Games 1 & 2
Sat. 6/2/07	4	Winner Games 1 & 2
Sun. 6/3/07	5	Winner Game 3 vs Loser Game 4
Sun. 6/3/07	6	Winner Games 4 & 5
Mon. 6/4/07	7	if needed, only if winner of game 5 wins game 6

Best-of-three super regionals were held Friday, June 8 through Monday, June 11. Four series were played Friday-Sunday and four series were played Saturday-Monday.

Bold indicates winner. * indicates extra innings.

=== Corvallis Super Regional ===
Hosted by Oregon State at Goss Stadium

First round	Second round
1	**Vanderbilt**	**2**^{11}
4	Austin Peay	1
1	Vanderbilt	3
2	**Michigan**	**4**
3	Memphis	7
2	**Michigan**	**10**
Nashville Regional – Hawkins Field
4	**Austin Peay**	**18**
3	Memphis	7	4	Austin Peay	5
1	**Vanderbilt**	**11**
1	**Virginia**	**5**
4	Lafayette	1
1	**Virginia**	**7**^{13}
3	Oregon State	4
3	**Oregon State**	**5**
2	Rutgers	1
Charlottesville Regional – Davenport Field
4	Lafayette	10
2	**Rutgers**	**11**	2	Rutgers	2
3	**Oregon State**	**5**

Regional finals
2	**Michigan**	7	**4**^{10}
1	Vanderbilt	**10**	3
1	Virginia	3	3
3	**Oregon State**	**5**	**7**

Super regionals
Michigan	0	2	—
**Oregon State**	**1**	**8**	—

=== Houston Super Regional ===
Hosted by Rice at Reckling Park

First round	Second round
1	**Rice**	**5**
4	Prairie View A&M	0
1	**Rice**	**6**
2	TCU	3
3	Baylor	2
2	**TCU**	**3**
Houston Regional – Reckling Park
4	Prairie View A&M	2
3	**Baylor**	**9**	3	Baylor	5
2	**TCU**	**10**
1	**Texas A&M**	**7**
4	Le Moyne	2
1	Texas A&M	4
2	**Louisiana–Lafayette**	**5**
3	Ohio State	4
2	**Louisiana–Lafayette**	**5**
College Station Regional – Olsen Field
4	Le Moyne	5
3	**Ohio State**	**6**^{10}	3	Ohio State	4
1	**Texas A&M**	**10**

Regional finals
1	**Rice**	**3**	—
2	TCU	1	—
2	Louisiana–Lafayette	1	2
1	**Texas A&M**	**4**	**5**

Super regionals
2	**Rice**	**3**^{10}	**5**	—
Texas A&M	2	2	—

=== Chapel Hill Super Regional ===
Hosted by North Carolina at Boshamer Stadium

First round	Second round
1	**North Carolina**	**6**
4	Jacksonville	0
1	**North Carolina**	**11**
2	East Carolina	10
3	Western Carolina	8
2	**East Carolina**	**9**
Chapel Hill Regional – Boshamer Stadium
4	Jacksonville	0
3	**Western Carolina**	**7**	3	**Western Carolina**	**9**
2	East Carolina	5
1	**South Carolina**	**9**
4	Wofford	1
1	**South Carolina**	**12**
3	Charlotte	8
3	**Charlotte**	**6**
2	NC State	3
Columbia, SC Regional – Sarge Frye Field
4	Wofford	6
2	**NC State**	**10**	2	NC State	10
3	**Charlotte**	**12**

Regional finals
1	**North Carolina**	**6**	—
3	Western Carolina	5	—
1	**South Carolina**	**11**	—
3	Charlotte	6	—

Super regionals
3	**North Carolina**	**9**	6	**9**
South Carolina	6	**8**	4

=== Wichita Super Regional ===
Hosted by Wichita State at Eck Stadium

First round	Second round
1	**Texas**	**8**
4	Brown	2
1	Texas	1
2	**UC Irvine**	**3**
3	Wake Forest	0
2	**UC Irvine**	**13**
Round Rock Regional – Dell Diamond
4	Brown	2
3	**Wake Forest**	**4**	3	Wake Forest	4
1	**Texas**	**7**^{12}
1	Wichita State	6
4	**New Orleans**	**7**
4	New Orleans	8
2	**Arizona**	**9**
3	Oral Roberts	3
2	**Arizona**	**4**
Wichita Regional – Eck Stadium
1	**Wichita State**	**11**
3	Oral Roberts	4	1	**Wichita State**	**7**
4	New Orleans	3

Regional finals
2	**UC Irvine**	**9**	—
1	Texas	6	—
2	Arizona	3	0
1	**Wichita State**	**4**	**3**

Super regionals
**UC Irvine**	**1**	**3**	—
Wichita State	0	2	—

=== Tempe Super Regional ===
Hosted by Arizona State at Packard Stadium

First round	Second round
1	**Arizona State**	**5**
4	Monmouth	3
1	**Arizona State**	**9**
2	UC Riverside	2
3	Nebraska	5
2	**UC Riverside**	**10**
Tempe Regional – Packard Stadium
4	Monmouth	5
3	**Nebraska**	**6**	3	**Nebraska**	**11**
2	UC Riverside	1
1	**Ole Miss**	**14**
4	Sam Houston State	5
1	**Ole Miss**	**4**
2	Southern Miss	0
3	Troy	1
2	**Southern Miss**	**14**
Oxford Regional – Swayze Field
4	**Sam Houston State**	**5**
3	Troy	4	4	**Sam Houston State**	**12**^{11}
2	Southern Miss	11

Regional finals
1	**Arizona State**	**19**	—
3	Nebraska	7	—
1	**Ole Miss**	**21**	—
4	Sam Houston State	13	—

Super regionals
5	**Arizona State**	**4**	**7**	—
Ole Miss	3	1	—

=== Starkville Super Regional ===
Hosted by Mississippi State at Dudy Noble Field

First round	Second round
1	**Florida State**	**6**
4	Bethune–Cookman	2
1	Florida State	0
2	**Mississippi State**	**3**
3	Stetson	3
2	**Mississippi State**	**6**
Tallahassee Regional – Dick Howser Stadium
4	Bethune–Cookman	0
3	**Stetson**	**12**	3	Stetson	1
1	**Florida State**	**17**
1	**Coastal Carolina**	**7**
4	VCU	1
1	Coastal Carolina	8
2	**Clemson**	**11**
3	St. John's	2
2	**Clemson**	**3**
Myrtle Beach Regional – Coastal Federal Field
4	VCU	4
3	**St. John's**	**5**	3	St. John's	5
1	**Coastal Carolina**	**6**

Regional finals
2	**Mississippi State**	**9**	—
1	Florida State	4	—
2	**Clemson**	**15**	—
1	Coastal Carolina	3	—

Super regionals
**Mississippi State**	**8**	**8**	—
Clemson	6	5	—

=== Louisville Super Regional ===
Hosted by Louisville at Jim Patterson Stadium

First round	Second round
1	**Arkansas**	**9**
4	Albany	0
1	Arkansas	3
3	**Oklahoma State**	**14**
3	**Oklahoma State**	**6**
2	Creighton	4
Fayetteville Regional – Baum Stadium
4	Albany	11
2	**Creighton**	**21**	2	Creighton	0
1	**Arkansas**	**6**
1	**Missouri**	**10**
4	Kent State	2
1	**Missouri**	**7**
3	Louisville	5
3	**Louisville**	**13**
2	Miami (FL)	7
Columbia, MO Regional – Taylor Stadium
4	Kent State	7
2	**Miami (FL)**	**8**	2	Miami (FL)	7
3	**Louisville**	**8**

Regional finals
3	**Oklahoma State**	**7**	—
1	Arkansas	6	—
1	Missouri	3	6
3	**Louisville**	**4**	**16**

Super regionals
Oklahoma State	0	**3**^{12}	2
**Louisville**	**9**	2	**20**

=== Fullerton Super Regional ===
Hosted by Cal State Fullerton at Goodwin Field

First round	Second round
1	San Diego	2
4	**Fresno State**	**6**
4	Fresno State	4
2	**Cal State Fullerton**	**6**
3	Minnesota	1
2	**Cal State Fullerton**	**7**
San Diego Regional – Tony Gwynn Stadium
1	San Diego	5
3	**Minnesota**	**6**^{10}	3	Minnesota	6
4	**Fresno State**	**11**
1	Long Beach State	1
4	**UIC**	**4**
4	UIC	1
2	**UCLA**	**3**
3	Pepperdine	3
2	**UCLA**	**7**
Long Beach Regional – Blair Field
1	**Long Beach State**	**6**
3	Pepperdine	3	1	**Long Beach State**	**4**
4	UIC	3

Regional finals
2	**Cal State Fullerton**	**13**	—
4	Fresno State	2	—
2	**UCLA**	**7**	—
1	Long Beach State	4	—

Super regionals
**Cal State Fullerton**	**12**	**2**	—
UCLA	2	1	—

== Tournament notes ==
- Albany, Brown, and Wofford were making their first NCAA tournament appearance.
- Oregon State is one of only six teams (South Carolina: 2010–2011, LSU: 1996–1997, Stanford: 1987–1988, Southern California: 1970–1974, Texas: 1949–1950) to win consecutive CWS titles.
- Oregon State is also the first team to repeat as champion since the CWS switched to the current 3-game championship series.
- Oregon State is the first champion to make it back to the CWS the year after they won title since Texas appeared in the 2003 after winning it in 2002
- The 2007 Oregon State Beavers are the first CWS champions with a conference record of less than .500 (10–14)
- Louisville is the second school whose athletic teams have played in a Final Four, BCS bowl game, and a College World Series within the last three years. Florida is the other school.
- 2007 marks the 15th year in a row that the SEC has had at least one team make it to Omaha.
- 2007 marks the second time the College World Series champions and runners-up are the same two consecutive years.

=== CWS records tied or broken ===
- Oregon State became the first team to win four games by six or more runs in the CWS. As of 2021, 2007 Oregon State remains the final team to win four games by six or more runs in the CWS.
- Oregon State became the first team to win the CWS while having a losing record in regular season conference play.
- North Carolina's Rob Wooten pitched in a record 6 games in a single CWS.
- North Carolina tied a CWS record by turning five double plays in game one of the final series against Oregon State.
- North Carolina used a CWS record eight pitchers in its Game 6 loss to Rice.
- Game 7 between UC-Irvine and Cal State-Fullerton went 13 innings and lasted 5 hours and 40 minutes. It was the longest game in terms of time in College World Series history. The game also had the most hit-by-pitches (eight) and reportedly used and lost 96 balls, the most ever. The previous record was 84 balls lost.
- Louisville's Logan Johnson tied the CWS record with four home runs.
- By beating Arizona State, UC-Irvine became the first team in CWS history to win two extra-inning games back to back.
- A CWS record number of batters were hit by pitches during the series.

== College World Series ==
=== Participants ===
School	Conference	Record (conference)	Head coach	CWS appearances	Best CWS finish	CWS record Not including this year
Arizona State	Pac-10	48–13 (19–5)	Pat Murphy	19 (last: 2005)	1st (1965, 1967, 1969, 1977, 1981)	58–32
Cal State Fullerton	Big West	38–23 (10–11)	George Horton	14 (last: 2006)	1st (1979, 1984, 1995, 2004)	34–23
Louisville	Big East	46–22 (19–8)	Dan McDonnell	0 (last: none)	none	0–0
Mississippi State	SEC	38–20 (15–13)	Ron Polk	7 (last: 1998)	3rd (1985)	7–14
North Carolina	ACC	53–13 (21–9)	Mike Fox	5 (last: 2006)	2nd (2006)	6–10
Oregon State	Pac-10	44–18 (10–14)	Pat Casey	3 (last: 2006)	1st (2006)	6–6
Rice	C-USA	54–12 (22–2)	Wayne Graham	5 (last: 2006)	1st (2003)	8–9
UC Irvine	Big West	45–15–1 (15–6)	Dave Serrano	0 (last: none)	none	0–0

=== Bracket ===
First round
**Oregon State**	**3**
Cal State Fullerton	2
5	**Arizona State**	**5**
UC Irvine	4
Cal State Fullerton	4
**UC Irvine**	**5**^{13}
2	**Rice**	**15**
Louisville	10
Mississippi State	5
3	**North Carolina**	**8**
**Louisville**	**12**
Mississippi State	4

Second round
**Oregon State**	**12**
5	Arizona State	6
5	Arizona State	7
**UC Irvine**	**8**^{10}
2	**Rice**	**14**
3	North Carolina	4
3	**North Carolina**	**3**
Louisville	1

Semifinals
**Oregon State**	**7**	—
UC Irvine	1	—
2	Rice	1	4
3	**North Carolina**	**6**	**7**

Finals
**Oregon State**	**11**	**9**	—
3	North Carolina	4	3	—

=== Championship series ===
==== Saturday 6/23 ====
===== Game 14: 6:00 pm =====
Team	1	2	3	4	5	6	7	8	9	R	H	E
North Carolina	0	0	0	0	2	0	1	1	0	**4**	**12**	**2**
**Oregon State**	0	2	1	0	1	2	4	1	X	**11**	**12**	**2**
WP: Jorge Reyes (2–0) LP: Alex White (6–7); Home runs: UNC: Johnson; OSU: Lennerton

==== Sunday 6/24 ====
===== Game 15: 6:00 pm =====
Team	1	2	3	4	5	6	7	8	9	R	H	E
**Oregon State**	0	3	1	0	1	0	2	0	2	**9**	**13**	**0**
North Carolina	1	0	1	0	1	0	0	0	0	**3**	**9**	**2**
WP: Mike Stutes (12–4) LP: Luke Putkonen (8–2); Home runs: OSU: Barney, Lennerton; UNC: Ackley

=== All-Tournament Team ===
The following players were members of the All-Tournament Team.

Position	Player	School
P	**Jorge Reyes (MOP)**	Oregon State
P	Andrew Carignan	North Carolina
C	Mitch Canham	Oregon State
1B	Dustin Ackley	North Carolina
2B	Joey Wong	Oregon State
3B	Diego Seastrunk	Rice
SS	Darwin Barney	Oregon State
OF	Bryan Petersen	UC Irvine
OF	Tim Fedroff	North Carolina
OF	Scott Santschi	Oregon State
DH	Mike Lissman	Oregon State

== Tournament performance by conference ==
Conference	Tournament record	Percentage	Schools to super regionals	Schools to CWS
Pacific-10	21–6	0.778	Arizona St, Oregon St, UCLA	Arizona St, Oregon St
Big West	14–7	0.667	UC Irvine, Cal State Fullerton	UC Irvine, Cal State Fullerton
SEC	17–10	0.630	Ole Miss, Mississippi St, South Carolina	Mississippi St
Big East	10–8	0.556	Louisville	Louisville
ACC	19–16	0.543	Clemson, North Carolina	North Carolina
Big 12	15–13	0.536	Oklahoma St, Texas A&M	
Conference USA	9–8	0.529	Rice	Rice
Missouri Valley	5–5	0.500	Wichita State	
Atlantic 10	2–2	0.500		
Big South	2–2	0.500		
Mountain West	2–2	0.500		
Southland	2–2	0.500		
Western Athletic	2–2	0.500		
Big 10	5–7	0.417	Michigan	
Sun Belt	3–6	0.333		
Southern	2–4	0.333		
Horizon	1–2	0.333		
Ohio Valley	1–2	0.333		
Atlantic Sun	1–4	0.200		
America East	0–2	0.000		
Colonial	0–2	0.000		
Ivy	0–2	0.000		
Metro Atlantic	0–2	0.000		
Mid-American	0–2	0.000		
Mid-Con	0–2	0.000		
Mid-Eastern	0–2	0.000		
Northeast	0–2	0.000		
Patriot	0–2	0.000		
Southwestern Athletic	0–2	0.000		
WCC	0–4	0.000		

== See also ==
- 2007 NCAA Division II baseball tournament
- 2007 NCAA Division III baseball tournament
- 2007 NAIA World Series
