= Tony Thomas (baseball) =

American baseball player (born 1986)

- Second baseman
- Born: July 10, 1986 (age 40); New Orleans, Louisiana, U.S.
- Bats: Right Throws: Right

Anthony Darrell Thomas, Jr. (born July 10, 1986) is an American former professional baseball infielder. He was a co-winner of the Collegiate Baseball Newspaper Collegiate Baseball Player of the Year honor in 2007, alongside pitcher David Price.

== Early life ==
He was born in New Orleans, Louisiana, but attended Bloomingdale High School in Valrico, Florida. In 2002, he was a member of the 2002 USA Youth National Olympic Team. FSU biography He then attended Florida State University.

== College career ==
His first year at Florida State was 2005. He batted .240 in 72 games. In 2006, he hit .289 with 19 stolen bases in 65 games and played for the Cotuit Kettleers of the Cape Cod League during the summer. In 2007, he slashed .430/.522/.733 with 33 doubles, 11 home runs, 31 RBI and 91 runs scored in 62 games to co-earn the Collegiate Baseball Player of the Year honor. He earned numerous other honors that year, as well: Rivals.com also named him the college player of the year and – along with College Baseball Newspaper – named him a first-team All-American. He was a finalist for the Golden Spikes Award and Dick Howser Trophy and was a semi-finalist for the Brooks Wallace Award. He was the Atlantic Coast Conference Player of the Year and an All-ACC first team member. Thomas was inducted into the Florida State Athletics Hall of Fame in 2017.

== Professional career ==
Thomas was drafted by the Chicago Cubs in the third round of the 2007 Major League Baseball draft, one pick after pitcher Danny Duffy. He was signed by scout Rolando Pino and began his professional career that year. He was named a Baseball America Short Season All-Star his first campaign, batting .308/.404/.544 with 28 stolen bases in 46 games for the Boise Hawks and .296/.393/.533 on the year overall. He was a Florida State League Mid-Season All-Star in 2008, hitting .266 with 22 stolen bases in 113 games for the Daytona Cubs. Going in 2008, he was named the ninth-best prospect in the Cubs system by Baseball America. He was named a Southern League Mid-Season All-Star in 2009, hitting .251 with 11 home runs and 13 stolen bases for the Tennessee Smokies; the next year, he was a MiLB.com Organization All-Star after hitting .276 with 11 home runs, 11 triples and 15 stolen bases for Tennessee.

On February 11, 2011, he was traded to the Boston Red Sox for pitcher Robert Coello. He played in Triple-A for the first time that season, hitting .212 with 11 stolen bases in 80 games for the Pawtucket Red Sox. He returned to Pawtucket for 2012 and hit .242 with 10 home runs and 12 stolen bases in 68 games. Between the Double-A Portland Sea Dogs and Pawtucket in 2013, Thomas hit .228 with 11 home runs and 18 stolen bases in 123 games.

For 2014, he was signed as a free agent by the Minnesota Twins. He played for their Double-A club, the New Britain Rock Cats, and hit .241 with 12 home runs and 14 stolen bases in 129 games to earn MiLB.com Organization All-Star honors. He joined the Philadelphia Phillies system to begin 2015 and played for the Reading Fightin Phils. On May 30, he was released and on June 2, the Detroit Tigers signed him. He played for the Erie SeaWolves in their system before being released again on July 31. The Chicago White Sox signed him on August 5 and he joined the Birmingham Barons. All told, he played 94 games that year and hit .249. He became a free agent following the season.

Thomas later played for the St. Paul Saints of the American Association of Independent Professional Baseball. On July 11, 2019, while playing for the Southern Maryland Blue Crabs of the Atlantic League of Professional Baseball, Thomas became the first player in baseball history to steal first base.

== Personal life ==
His uncle, Maurice Hurst, played professional football.
