= Jorge Reyes (baseball) =

American baseball player

- Pitcher
- Born: December 7, 1987 (age 38); Rio Grande City, Texas, U.S.
- Bats: Switch Throws: Right
- Stats at Baseball Reference

Career highlights and awards
- College World Series Most Outstanding Player (2007)

Jorge Luis Reyes (born December 7, 1987) is an American former professional baseball pitcher. He was the Most Outstanding Player in the 2007 College World Series for the Oregon State Beavers. Reyes was drafted by the San Diego Padres in the 17th round of the 2009 Major League Baseball draft.

== High school ==
Although born in Texas, Reyes calls Warden, Washington, home and played high school baseball there. He graduated from Warden High School in 2006.

Reyes lettered 4 years for coach Dan Caballero. As a senior, he was named all-state first team, all-area first team, all-league first team, posted a 6–1 record, 0.32 ERA in 43.2 innings and had 78 strikeouts. As a junior, he was named all-state first team, all-area first team, all-league first team with a 9–0 record, 0.40 ERA in 51 innings with 101 strikeouts. Reyes also played American football and basketball.

== College ==
Reyes was named a second team freshman All-American by Baseball America at the end of the 2007 season. He was also declared the 2007 College World Series Most Outstanding Player, only the 5th freshman in the history of the College World Series to be named as such.

Reyes posted a record of 7–3 during the 2007 season, including 2 games (2 victories) during the College World Series; the first one, a victory against Cal State Fullerton and the second one, a victory in the first game of the Championship Finals against the University of North Carolina. His ERA for the season was 3.10.

In 2008, he played collegiate summer baseball for the Falmouth Commodores of the Cape Cod Baseball League, then returned to the league in 2009 to play for the Orleans Firebirds.

== Professional career ==
=== San Diego Padres ===
Reyes was drafted by the San Diego Padres in the 17th round, 504th overall, of the 2009 Major League Baseball draft. Reyes made his professional debut with the Low-A Eugene Emeralds, posting a 1–1 record in 3 games. In 2010, Reyes played for the High-A Lake Elsinore Storm, posting an 8-4 record and 5.00 ERA in 18 appearances. The following season, Reyes played for the Double-A San Antonio Missions, recording a 10–3 record and 3.12 ERA in 33 appearances. In 2012, Reyes played for the Triple-A Tucson Padres, registering a 10–11 record and 5.09 ERA with 99 strikeouts in 152 innings of work. He returned to Tucson in 2013, posting a 6–3 record and 5.28 ERA in 42 appearances.

In 2014, Reyes and his teammates on the Triple-A El Paso Chihuahuas played a month-long prank on veteran teammate Jeff Francoeur. The prank was that Reyes was deaf. Reyes took elaborate steps to ensure the prank's success, including not listening to music in front of Francoeur and having the catcher sign (which was most likely not real sign language) while talking to him during mound visits. Teammate Cody Decker filmed and produced a seven-minute documentary, "On Jeff Ears," revealing the truth to Francoeur. The prank documentary went viral, getting over 1.5 million hits on YouTube. Reyes posted a 3.86 ERA in 24 games for El Paso.

=== Atlanta Braves ===
On June 2, 2014, Reyes was traded to the Atlanta Braves in exchange for cash considerations. He finished the year split between the Double-A Mississippi Braves and the Triple-A Gwinnett Braves, accumulating a 1–4 record in 27 appearances. In 2015, Reyes split the year between Mississippi and Gwinnett, registering a 6–9 record and 4.46 ERA with 69 strikeouts in 84 2/3 innings pitched. On November 6, 2015, he elected free agency.

=== Toros de Tijuana ===
On March 5, 2016, Reyes signed with the Toros de Tijuana of the Mexican League. In 7 games with Tijuana, Reyes logged a 6.87 ERA with 17 strikeouts.

=== Piratas de Campeche ===
On June 16, 2016, Reyes was traded to the Piratas de Campeche of the Mexican League, and posted a 5–2 record and 3.86 ERA in nine appearances with the team.

=== Québec Capitales ===
On August 31, 2016, Reyes signed with the Québec Capitales of the Can-Am League. He made one appearance for the team, and posted and allowed two runs in six innings of work with the team.

=== Sultanes de Monterrey ===
Reyes was returned to Tijuana on September 19, but was traded back to Campeche on November 17 in exchange for Jose Manuel Lopez. On March 22, 2017, Reyes was loaned to the Sultanes de Monterrey of the Mexican League. In 12 games with Monterrey in 2017, Reyes recorded a 4–3 record and 3.97 ERA with 39 strikeouts in 56 2/3 innings pitched. In 2018, Reyes pitched to a 5–1 record with 61 strikeouts in 14 games and was named a Mexican League All-Star.

=== Leones de Yucatán ===
On August 13, 2018, Reyes was loaned to the Leones de Yucatán of the Mexican League. He finished the year with the team, logging 14 scoreless innings with 11 strikeouts.

=== Tecolotes de los Dos Laredos ===
On August 8, 2019, Reyes signed with the Tecolotes de los Dos Laredos of the Mexican League. In 5 games with Dos Laredos, Reyes struggled to a 1–3 record and 9.64 ERA in 18 2/3 innings of work.

=== Acereros de Monclova ===
On December 16, 2019, Reyes was traded to the Acereros de Monclova of the Mexican League in exchange for Jesus Arredondo and André Rienzo. Reyes did not play in a game in 2020 due to the cancellation of the Mexican League season because of the COVID-19 pandemic. He became a free agent after the year.

== International career ==
On February 26, 2019, Reyes was selected to play for the Mexico national baseball team at the 2019 exhibition games against Japan.
