= Clemson Tigers baseball, 2000–2009 =

American college baseball seasons

The Clemson Tigers baseball teams represented Clemson University in Clemson, South Carolina, United States in the sport of college baseball in the NCAA Division I Atlantic Coast Conference. The program was established in 1896, and has continuously fielded a team since 1945. In this decade, the Tigers reached the College World Series in Omaha, Nebraska three times, reached the Super Regional round an additional four times, and made nine total appearances in the NCAA Division I Baseball Championship.

== 2001 ==
2001 Clemson Tigers baseball

Clemson Regional champions

Coral Gables Super Regional, 0–2
- Conference: Atlantic Coast Conference

Ranking
- Coaches: No. 14
- CB: No. 13
- Record: 41–22 (17–7 ACC)
- Head coach: Jack Leggett
- Home stadium: Beautiful Tiger Field

2001 Atlantic Coast Conference baseball standings
| | Conf. | | | | Overall |
| Team | W | | L | PCT | W | | L | PCT |
|---|---|---|---|---|---|---|---|---|
| No. 9 Florida State ‍†‍‍^{y} | 20 | – | 4 | .833 | 47 | – | 19 | .712 |
| No. 13 Clemson ‍‍‍^{y} | 17 | – | 7 | .708 | 41 | – | 22 | .651 |
| No. 18 Wake Forest ‍‍‡‍^{y} | 16 | – | 8 | .667 | 44 | – | 18 | .710 |
| No. 27 Georgia Tech ‍‍‍^{y} | 13 | – | 11 | .542 | 41 | – | 20 | .672 |
| Duke ‍‍‍ | 10 | – | 13 | .435 | 23 | – | 33 | .411 |
| North Carolina ‍‍‍ | 9 | – | 15 | .375 | 31 | – | 26 | .544 |
| Virginia ‍‍‍ | 9 | – | 15 | .375 | 25 | – | 31 | .446 |
| NC State ‍‍‍ | 9 | – | 15 | .375 | 32 | – | 29 | .525 |
| Maryland ‍‍‍ | 4 | – | 19 | .174 | 17 | – | 37 | .315 |
† – Conference champion ‡ – Tournament champion y – Invited to the NCAA tournament As of June 30, 2001; Rankings from Collegiate Baseball

=== Roster ===
2001 Clemson Tigers roster
| - Zane Green; - Ryan Klosterman; - Seth Miller; - Jon Smith | **Pitchers**: - Thomas Boozer; - Ryan Childs; - Nick Glaser; - Paul Harrelson; - Matt Henrie - Sophomore; - Patrick Hogan; - Steven Jackson; - B. J. LaMura; - Kevin Lynn; - Steve Reba - Junior; - Jarrod Schmidt - Sophomore; - Anthony Urrico | **Catchers**: - Steve Pyzik - Sophomore; **Infielders**: - Jeff Baker - Sophomore; - Khalil Greene - Junior; - Michael Johnson - Sophomore; - Ryan Riley - Senior | **Outfielders**: - Chad Coder - Sophomore; - Kyle Frank - Sophomore; - Casey Stone - Sophomore; **Utility**: - Russell Triplett - RS Freshman |

=== Schedule ===
Legend
| | Clemson win |
| | Clemson loss |
| **Bold** | Clemson team member |
| * | Non-Conference game |

2001 Clemson Tigers baseball game log (41–22)
Regular season (37–18)

February (6–3)
| Date | Opponent | Rank | Site/stadium | Score | Overall record | ACC record |
|---|---|---|---|---|---|---|
| Feb 16 | Richmond* | No. 5 | Beautiful Tiger Field • Clemson, SC | **L** 5–10 | 0–1 | |
| Feb 17 | Richmond* | No. 5 | Beautiful Tiger Field • Clemson, SC | **W** 14–4 | 1–1 | |
| Feb 18 | Richmond* | No. 5 | Beautiful Tiger Field • Clemson, SC | **W** 7–3 | 2–1 | |
| Feb 22 | at UNLV* | No. 10 | Earl Wilson Stadium • Paradise, NV | **W** 10–6 | 3–1 | |
| Feb 23 | vs Oregon State* | No. 10 | Earl Wilson Stadium • Paradise, NV | **W** 9–5 | 4–1 | |
| Feb 23 | at UNLV* | No. 10 | Earl Wilson Stadium • Paradise, NV | **L** 6–14 | 4–2 | |
| Feb 24 | vs Oregon State* | No. 10 | Earl Wilson Stadium • Paradise, NV | **L** 9–10 | 4–3 | |
| Feb 25 | vs Oregon State* | No. 10 | Earl Wilson Stadium • Paradise, NV | **W** 13–2^{7} | 5–3 | |
| Feb 28 | Furman* | No. 10 | Beautiful Tiger Field • Clemson, SC | **W** 7–4 | 6–3 | |

March (15–5)
| Date | Opponent | Rank | Site/stadium | Score | Overall record | ACC record |
|---|---|---|---|---|---|---|
| Mar 3 | No. 4 South Carolina* | No. 13 | Beautiful Tiger Field • Clemson, SC | **L** 8–21 | 6–4 | |
| Mar 4 | at No. 4 South Carolina* | No. 13 | Sarge Frye Field • Columbia, SC | **W** 7–4 | 7–4 | |
| Mar 7 | College of Charleston* | No. 13 | Beautiful Tiger Field • Clemson, SC | **W** 5–3 | 8–4 | |
| Mar 10 | Ohio* | No. 13 | Beautiful Tiger Field • Clemson, SC | **W** 5–2 | 9–4 | |
| Mar 11 | Ohio* | No. 13 | Beautiful Tiger Field • Clemson, SC | **W** 17–4 | 10–4 | |
| Mar 13 | Georgia Southern* | No. 10 | Beautiful Tiger Field • Clemson, SC | **L** 9–12^{10} | 10–5 | |
| Mar 14 | Georgia Southern* | No. 10 | Beautiful Tiger Field • Clemson, SC | **W** 9–3 | 11–5 | |
| Mar 16 | at Maryland | No. 10 | Shipley Field • College Park, MD | **W** 8–6 | 12–5 | 1–0 |
| Mar 17 | at Maryland | No. 10 | Shipley Field • College Park, MD | **W** 9–6 | 13–5 | 2–0 |
| Mar 18 | at Maryland | No. 10 | Shipley Field • College Park, MD | **W** 7–0 | 14–5 | 3–0 |
| Mar 20 | at Old Dominion* | No. 10 | Bud Metheny Baseball Complex • Norfolk, VA | **W** 11–1 | 15–5 | |
| Mar 21 | at Old Dominion* | No. 10 | Bud Metheny Baseball Complex • Norfolk, VA | **L** 8–10 | 15–6 | |
| Mar 23 | at Wake Forest | No. 10 | Gene Hooks Field at Wake Forest Baseball Park • Winston-Salem, NC | **W** 4–1^{12} | 16–6 | 4–0 |
| Mar 24 | at Wake Forest | No. 10 | Gene Hooks Field at Wake Forest Baseball Park • Winston-Salem, NC | **L** 3–12 | 16–7 | 4–1 |
| Mar 25 | at Wake Forest | No. 10 | Gene Hooks Field at Wake Forest Baseball Park • Winston-Salem, NC | **W** 9–1 | 17–7 | 5–1 |
| Mar 27 | Wofford* | No. 14 | Beautiful Tiger Field • Clemson, SC | **W** 6–0 | 18–7 | |
| Mar 28 | at No. 26 Georgia* | No. 14 | Foley Field • Athens, GA | **L** 4–8 | 18–8 | |
| Mar 30 | NYIT* | No. 14 | Beautiful Tiger Field • Clemson, SC | **W** 24–3 | 19–8 | |
| Mar 31 | NYIT* | No. 14 | Beautiful Tiger Field • Clemson, SC | **W** 13–0 | 20–8 | |
| Mar 31 | NYIT* | No. 14 | Beautiful Tiger Field • Clemson, SC | **W** 14–0 | 21–8 | |

April (10–9)
| Date | Opponent | Rank | Site/stadium | Score | Overall record | ACC record |
|---|---|---|---|---|---|---|
| Apr 4 | Winthrop* | No. 8 | Beautiful Tiger Field • Clemson, SC | **L** 4–8 | 21–9 | |
| Apr 6 | at No. 5 Florida State | No. 8 | Dick Howser Stadium • Tallahassee, FL | **L** 4–7 | 21–10 | 5–2 |
| Apr 7 | at No. 5 Florida State | No. 8 | Dick Howser Stadium • Tallahassee, FL | **L** 6–77 | 21–11 | 5–3 |
| Apr 8 | at No. 5 Florida State | No. 8 | Dick Howser Stadium • Tallahassee, FL | **L** 1–6 | 21–12 | 5–4 |
| Apr 10 | Coastal Carolina* | No. 17 | Beautiful Tiger Field • Clemson, SC | **L** 5–10 | 21–13 | |
| Apr 11 | Coastal Carolina* | No. 17 | Beautiful Tiger Field • Clemson, SC | **W** 8–7^{11} | 22–13 | |
| Apr 13 | Duke | No. 17 | Beautiful Tiger Field • Clemson, SC | **W** 10–2 | 23–13 | 6–4 |
| Apr 14 | Duke | No. 17 | Beautiful Tiger Field • Clemson, SC | **W** 10–1 | 24–13 | 7–4 |
| Apr 15 | Duke | No. 17 | Beautiful Tiger Field • Clemson, SC | **W** 6–4 | 25–13 | 8–4 |
| Apr 17 | No. 29 Georgia* | No. 13 | Beautiful Tiger Field • Clemson, SC | **W** 10–4 | 26–13 | |
| Apr 18 | at No. 19 South Carolina* | No. 13 | Sarge Frye Field • Columbia, SC | **L** 3–9 | 26–14 | |
| Apr 20 | No. 11 Georgia Tech | No. 13 | Beautiful Tiger Field • Clemson, SC | **W** 3–0 | 27–14 | 9–4 |
| Apr 21 | No. 11 Georgia Tech | No. 13 | Beautiful Tiger Field • Clemson, SC | **W** 5–1 | 28–14 | 10–4 |
| Apr 22 | No. 11 Georgia Tech | No. 13 | Beautiful Tiger Field • Clemson, SC | **L** 3–5 | 28–15 | 10–5 |
| Apr 24 | Western Carolina* | No. 12 | Beautiful Tiger Field • Clemson, SC | **W** 8–2 | 29–15 | |
| Apr 25 | No. 24 South Carolina* | No. 12 | Beautiful Tiger Field • Clemson, SC | **L** 1–2 | 29–16 | |
| Apr 27 | North Carolina | No. 12 | Beautiful Tiger Field • Clemson, SC | **W** 6–3 | 30–16 | 11–5 |
| Apr 28 | North Carolina | No. 12 | Beautiful Tiger Field • Clemson, SC | **W** 10–9^{10} | 31–16 | 12–5 |
| Apr 29 | North Carolina | No. 12 | Beautiful Tiger Field • Clemson, SC | **L** 0–4 | 31–17 | 12–6 |

May (6–1)
| Date | Opponent | Rank | Site/stadium | Score | Overall record | ACC record |
|---|---|---|---|---|---|---|
| May 5 | at NC State | No. 14 | Doak Field • Raleigh, NC | **W** 7–6 | 32–17 | 13–6 |
| May 5 | at NC State | No. 14 | Doak Field • Raleigh, NC | **L** 3–4 | 32–18 | 13–7 |
| May 6 | at NC State | No. 14 | Doak Field • Raleigh, NC | **W** 10–2 | 33–18 | 14–7 |
| May 9 | at Furman* | No. 13 | Latham Baseball Stadium • Greenville, SC | **W** 9–6^{11} | 34–18 | |
| May 12 | Virginia | No. 13 | Beautiful Tiger Field • Clemson, SC | **W** 8–1 | 35–18 | 15–7 |
| May 12 | Virginia | No. 13 | Beautiful Tiger Field • Clemson, SC | **W** 17–1 | 36–18 | 16–7 |
| May 13 | Virginia | No. 13 | Beautiful Tiger Field • Clemson, SC | **W** 5–4 | 37–18 | 17–7 |

Postseason (4–4)

ACC Tournament (1–2)
| Date | Opponent | Rank | Site/stadium | Score | Overall record | ACCT Record |
|---|---|---|---|---|---|---|
| May 16 | (7) Virginia | (2) No. 13 | Knights Stadium • Fort Mill, SC | **L** 3–7 | 37–19 | 0–1 |
| May 17 | (6) North Carolina | (2) No. 13 | Knights Stadium • Fort Mill, SC | **W** 7–6 | 38–19 | 1–1 |
| May 18 | (1) No. 7 Florida State | (2) No. 13 | Knights Stadium • Fort Mill, SC | **L** 4–5 | 38–20 | 1–2 |

NCAA Clemson Regional (3–0)
| Date | Opponent | Rank | Site/stadium | Score | Overall record | Regional Record |
|---|---|---|---|---|---|---|
| May 25 | (3) William & Mary | (2) No. 14 | Beautiful Tiger Field • Clemson, SC | **W** 4–1 | 39–20 | 1–0 |
| May 26 | (4) Seton Hall | (2) No. 14 | Beautiful Tiger Field • Clemson, SC | **W** 24–4 | 40–20 | 2–0 |
| May 27 | (4) Seton Hall | (2) No. 14 | Beautiful Tiger Field • Clemson, SC | **W** 8–2 | 41–20 | 3–0 |

NCAA Coral Gables Super Regional (0–2)
| Date | Opponent | Rank | Site/stadium | Score | Overall record | SR Record |
|---|---|---|---|---|---|---|
| June 1 | at (2) No. 1 Miami (FL) | No. 12 | Mark Light Field • Coral Gables, FL | **L** 8–10 | 41–21 | 0–1 |
| June 2 | at (2) No. 1 Miami (FL) | No. 12 | Mark Light Field • Coral Gables, FL | **L** 6–14 | 41–22 | 0–2 |

=== Rankings ===
Ranking movements Legend: ██ Increase in ranking ██ Decrease in ranking
| | Week | | | | | | | | | | | | | | | | | | | |
| Poll | Pre | 1 | 2 | 3 | 4 | 5 | 6 | 7 | 8 | 9 | 10 | 11 | 12 | 13 | 14 | 15 | 16 | 17 | 18 | Final |
|---|---|---|---|---|---|---|---|---|---|---|---|---|---|---|---|---|---|---|---|---|
| Coaches' | | * | | | | | | | | | | | | | | | | | | 14 |
| Baseball America | | | | | | | | | | | | | | | | | | | | 17 |
| Collegiate Baseball^ | 5 | 5 | 5 | 10 | 13 | 13 | 10 | 10 | 14 | 8 | 17 | 13 | 12 | 14 | 13 | 13 | 14 | 12 | 13 | 13 |
| NCBWA† | | | | | | | | | | | | | | | | | | | | 14 |

^ Collegiate Baseball ranked 40 teams in their preseason poll, but only ranked 30 teams weekly during the season.
† NCBWA ranks 30 teams in their preseason poll, but only ranks 25 teams weekly during the season.
* A new poll was not released for this week, so for comparison purposes, the previous week's ranking is inserted in this week's slot.

== 2003 ==
2003 Clemson Tigers baseball

Auburn Regional, 1–2
- Conference: Atlantic Coast Conference
- Record: 39–22 (15–9 ACC)
- Head coach: Jack Leggett
- Home stadium: Doug Kingsmore Stadium

2003 Atlantic Coast Conference baseball standings
| | Conf. | | | | Overall |
| Team | W | | L | PCT | W | | L | PCT |
|---|---|---|---|---|---|---|---|---|
| No. 9 Florida State ‍†‍‍^{y} | 19 | – | 5 | .792 | 54 | – | 13 | .806 |
| No. 14 Georgia Tech ^{‡y} ‍‍‍ | 17 | – | 7 | .708 | 44 | – | 18 | .710 |
| No. 12 NC State ‍‍‍^{y} | 15 | – | 9 | .625 | 45 | – | 16 | .738 |
| Clemson ‍‍‍^{y} | 15 | – | 9 | .625 | 39 | – | 22 | .639 |
| No. 19 North Carolina ‍‍‍^{y} | 13 | – | 11 | .542 | 42 | – | 23 | .646 |
| Virginia ‍‍‍ | 11 | – | 12 | .478 | 29 | – | 25 | .537 |
| Wake Forest ‍‍‍ | 8 | – | 15 | .348 | 29 | – | 24 | .547 |
| Maryland ‍‍‍ | 6 | – | 17 | .261 | 20 | – | 33 | .377 |
| Duke ‍‍‍ | 2 | – | 21 | .087 | 18 | – | 36 | .333 |
† – Conference champion ‡ – Tournament champion y – Invited to the NCAA tournament As of June 30, 2003; Rankings from Collegiate Baseball

=== Roster ===
2003 Clemson Tigers roster
| - Herman Demmink - Freshman; - Garrick Evans; - Brady Everett; - Collin Mahoney; - Gene Pierce; - Daniel Pritchard; - Roberto Valiente | **Pitchers**: - Jason Berken - Freshman; - Pat Clayton; - Josh Cribb; - Jeff Hahn; - Paul Harrelson; - Kris Harvey; - Patrick Hogan; - Jeff Hourigan; - Steven Jackson - Junior; - Tyler Lumsden - Sophomore; - Brett Murphy; - Robert Rohrbaugh; - Aaron Trolia; - Adam Walker | **Catchers**: - Steve Pyzik - Senior; **Infielders**: - Michael Johnson - Senior; - Brad McCann - Sophomore; - David Slevin - Senior; - Russell Triplett - RS Junior | **Outfielders**: - Kyle Frank - Senior; - Zane Green - Junior; - Ryan Hub - Junior |

=== Schedule ===
Legend
| | Clemson win |
| | Clemson loss |
| **Bold** | Clemson team member |
| * | Non-Conference game |

2003 Clemson Tigers baseball game log
Regular season

February
| Date | Opponent | Rank | Site/stadium | Score | Overall record | ACC record |
|---|---|---|---|---|---|---|
| Feb 22 | at No. 23 Auburn* | No. 17 | Plainsman Park • Auburn, AL | **L** 1–8 | 0–1 | |
| Feb 22 | at No. 23 Auburn* | No. 17 | Plainsman Park • Auburn, AL | **W** 11–8 | 1–1 | |
| Feb 23 | at No. 23 Auburn* | No. 17 | Plainsman Park • Auburn, AL | **L** 3–7 | 1–2 | |
| Feb 26 | Charleston Southern* | No. 19 | Doug Kingsmore Stadium • Clemson, SC | **W** 5–0^{5} | 2–2 | |

March
| Date | Opponent | Rank | Site/stadium | Score | Overall record | ACC record |
|---|---|---|---|---|---|---|
| Mar 1 | No. 6 South Carolina* | No. 19 | Doug Kingsmore Stadium • Clemson, SC | **W** 8–0 | 3–2 | |
| Mar 2 | at No. 6 South Carolina* | No. 19 | Sarge Frye Field • Columbia, SC | **L** 4–6 | 3–3 | |
| Mar 4 | Winthrop* | No. 19 | Doug Kingsmore Stadium • Clemson, SC | **W** 5–4 | 4–3 | |
| Mar 5 | College of Charleston* | No. 19 | Doug Kingsmore Stadium • Clemson, SC | **W** 6–2 | 5–3 | |
| Mar 6 | Chukyo* (exh.) | No. 19 | Doug Kingsmore Stadium • Clemson, SC | **W** 6–2 | | |
| Mar 7 | Old Dominion* | No. 19 | Doug Kingsmore Stadium • Clemson, SC | **W** 2–0 | 6–3 | |
| Mar 8 | Old Dominion* | No. 19 | Doug Kingsmore Stadium • Clemson, SC | **W** 5–1 | 7–3 | |
| Mar 9 | Old Dominion* | No. 19 | Doug Kingsmore Stadium • Clemson, SC | **W** 18–2 | 8–3 | |
| Mar 11 | Tennessee Tech* | No. 19 | Doug Kingsmore Stadium • Clemson, SC | **W** 7–5 | 9–3 | |
| Mar 12 | Tennessee Tech* | No. 19 | Doug Kingsmore Stadium • Clemson, SC | **W** 8–0 | 10–3 | |
| Mar 16 | vs Georgia Southern* | No. 19 | Joseph P. Riley Jr. Park • Charleston, SC | **W** 11–1 | 11–3 | |
| Mar 17 | vs Georgia Southern* | No. 14 | Joseph P. Riley Jr. Park • Charleston, SC | **W** 8–0 | 12–3 | |
| Mar 18 | at College of Charleston* | No. 14 | CofC Baseball Stadium at Patriots Point • Mount Pleasant, SC | **W** 7–6 | 13–3 | |
| Mar 20 | Maine* | No. 14 | Doug Kingsmore Stadium • Clemson, SC | **W** 8–6 | 14–3 | |
| Mar 21 | Maine* | No. 14 | Doug Kingsmore Stadium • Clemson, SC | **W** 7–6 | 15–3 | |
| Mar 22 | Maine* | No. 14 | Doug Kingsmore Stadium • Clemson, SC | **W** 11–7 | 16–3 | |
| Mar 24 | Wofford* | No. 10 | Doug Kingsmore Stadium • Clemson, SC | **W** 21–7 | 17–3 | |
| Mar 25 | at Western Carolina* | No. 10 | Hennon Stadium • Cullowhee, NC | **L** 5–9 | 17–4 | |
| Mar 26 | Georgia* | No. 10 | Doug Kingsmore Stadium • Clemson, SC | **W** 7–3 | 18–4 | |
| Mar 28 | at No. 16 NC State | No. 10 | Grainger Stadium • Kinston, NC | **L** 2–3^{11} | 18–5 | 0–1 |
| Mar 29 | at No. 16 NC State | No. 10 | Grainger Stadium • Kinston, NC | **L** 2–12 | 18–6 | 0–2 |
| Mar 29 | at No. 16 NC State | No. 10 | Grainger Stadium • Kinston, NC | **W** 12–10 | 19–6 | 1–2 |

April
| Date | Opponent | Rank | Site/stadium | Score | Overall record | ACC record |
|---|---|---|---|---|---|---|
| Apr 1 | Western Carolina* | No. 15 | Doug Kingsmore Stadium • Clemson, SC | **W** 5–3 | 20–6 | |
| Apr 2 | at No. 22 South Carolina* | No. 15 | Sarge Frye Field • Columbia, SC | **W** 4–2 | 21–6 | |
| Apr 4 | Virginia | No. 15 | Doug Kingsmore Stadium • Clemson, SC | **W** 9–4 | 22–6 | 2–2 |
| Apr 5 | Virginia | No. 15 | Doug Kingsmore Stadium • Clemson, SC | **W** 1–4 | 22–7 | 2–3 |
| Apr 6 | Virginia | No. 15 | Doug Kingsmore Stadium • Clemson, SC | **L** 9–2 | 23–7 | 3–3 |
| Apr 9 | South Carolina | No. 13 | Doug Kingsmore Stadium • Clemson, SC | **W** 4–2 | 24–7 | |
| Apr 11 | at No. 2 Florida State | No. 13 | Dick Howser Stadium • Tallahassee, FL | **W** 8–4 | 25–7 | 4–3 |
| Apr 12 | at No. 2 Florida State | No. 13 | Dick Howser Stadium • Tallahassee, FL | **L** 2–7 | 25–8 | 4–4 |
| Apr 13 | at No. 2 Florida State | No. 13 | Dick Howser Stadium • Tallahassee, FL | **L** 1–8 | 25–9 | 4–5 |
| Apr 15 | Coastal Carolina* | No. 15 | Doug Kingsmore Stadium • Clemson, SC | **L** 1–5 | 25–10 | |
| Apr 16 | Coastal Carolina* | No. 15 | Doug Kingsmore Stadium • Clemson, SC | **W** 7–3 | 26–10 | |
| Apr 19 | at Maryland | No. 15 | Shipley Field • College Park, MD | **L** 6–9 | 26–11 | 4–6 |
| Apr 19 | at Maryland | No. 15 | Shipley Field • College Park, MD | **L** 4–8 | 26–12 | 4–7 |
| Apr 20 | at Maryland | No. 15 | Shipley Field • College Park, MD | **W** 20–5 | 27–12 | 5–7 |
| Apr 22 | at Georgia* | No. 23 | Foley Field • Athens, GA | **L** 3–9 | 27–13 | |
| Apr 23 | East Tennessee State* | No. 23 | Doug Kingsmore Stadium • Clemson, SC | **W** 6–3^{12} | 28–13 | |
| Apr 25 | No. 4 Georgia Tech | No. 23 | Doug Kingsmore Stadium • Clemson, SC | **W** 9–7^{10} | 29–13 | 6–7 |
| Apr 26 | No. 4 Georgia Tech | No. 23 | Doug Kingsmore Stadium • Clemson, SC | **W** 10–5 | 30–13 | 7–7 |
| Apr 27 | No. 4 Georgia Tech | No. 23 | Doug Kingsmore Stadium • Clemson, SC | **W** 11–3 | 31–13 | 8–7 |

May
| Date | Opponent | Rank | Site/stadium | Score | Overall record | ACC record |
|---|---|---|---|---|---|---|
| May 4 | Duke | No. 16 | Doug Kingsmore Stadium • Clemson, SC | **W** 7–6 | 32–13 | 9–7 |
| May 5 | Duke | No. 15 | Doug Kingsmore Stadium • Clemson, SC | **L** 6–7 | 32–14 | 9–8 |
| May 6 | Duke | No. 15 | Doug Kingsmore Stadium • Clemson, SC | **W** 13–2 | 33–14 | 10–8 |
| May 7 | Elon* | No. 15 | Doug Kingsmore Stadium • Clemson, SC | **L** 2–11 | 33–15 | |
| May 8 | at Furman* | No. 15 | Furman Baseball Stadium • Greenville, SC | **L** 8–10 | 33–16 | |
| May 10 | North Carolina | No. 15 | Doug Kingsmore Stadium • Clemson, SC | **L** 4–9 | 33–17 | 10–9 |
| May 11 | North Carolina | No. 15 | Doug Kingsmore Stadium • Clemson, SC | **W** 5–4^{10} | 34–17 | 11–9 |
| May 12 | North Carolina | | Doug Kingsmore Stadium • Clemson, SC | **W** 5–2 | 35–17 | 12–9 |
| May 13 | Furman* | | Doug Kingsmore Stadium • Clemson, SC | **L** 9–12 | 35–18 | |
| May 15 | at Wake Forest | | Gene Hooks Stadium • Winston-Salem, NC | **W** 6–2 | 36–18 | 13–9 |
| May 16 | at Wake Forest | | Gene Hooks Stadium • Winston-Salem, NC | **W** 14–3 | 37–18 | 14–9 |
| May 17 | at Wake Forest | | Gene Hooks Stadium • Winston-Salem, NC | **W** 4–3 | 38–18 | 15–9 |

Postseason

ACC Tournament
| Date | Opponent | Rank | Site/stadium | Score | Overall record | ACCT Record |
|---|---|---|---|---|---|---|
| May 22 | (5) North Carolina | No. 21 (4) | Salem Memorial Ballpark • Salem, VA | **L** 2–10 | 38–19 | 0–1 |
| May 23 | (9) Duke | No. 21 (4) | Salem Memorial Ballpark • Salem, VA | **L** 4–7 | 38–20 | 0–2 |

NCAA Auburn Regional
| Date | Opponent | Rank | Site/stadium | Score | Overall record | Regional Record |
|---|---|---|---|---|---|---|
| May 30 | (3) Ohio State | No. 27 (2) | Plainsman Park • Auburn, AL | **L** 8–10 | 38–21 | 0–1 |
| May 31 | (4) Princeton | No. 27 (2) | Plainsman Park • Auburn, AL | **W** 7–6^{10} | 39–21 | 1–1 |
| May 31 | (1) No. 16 Auburn | No. 27 (2) | Plainsman Park • Auburn, AL | **L** 0–15 | 39–22 | 1–2 |

=== Rankings ===
Ranking movements Legend: ██ Increase in ranking ██ Decrease in ranking — = Not ranked
| | Week | | | | | | | | | | | | | | | | | | | | |
| Poll | Pre | 1 | 2 | 3 | 4 | 5 | 6 | 7 | 8 | 9 | 10 | 11 | 12 | 13 | 14 | 15 | 16 | 17 | 18 | 19 | Final |
|---|---|---|---|---|---|---|---|---|---|---|---|---|---|---|---|---|---|---|---|---|---|
| Coaches' | | * | | | | | | | | | | | | | | | | | | | — |
| Baseball America | | | | | | | | | | | | | | | | | | | | | — |
| Collegiate Baseball^ | 18 | 18 | 18 | 17 | 19 | 19 | 19 | 14 | 10 | 15 | 13 | 15 | 23 | 16 | 15 | — | 21 | 27 | — | — | — |
| NCBWA† | 22 | 22 | 20 | 19 | 18 | 20 | 20 | 17 | 14 | 18 | 12 | 16 | 35 | 17 | 13 | — | — | 33 | 33* | 33* | — |

^ Collegiate Baseball ranked 40 teams in their preseason poll, but only ranked 30 teams weekly during the season.
† NCBWA ranks 30 teams in their preseason poll, but only ranks 25 teams weekly during the season.
* A new poll was not released for this week, so for comparison purposes, the previous week's ranking is inserted in this week's slot.

== 2004 ==
2004 Clemson Tigers baseball

Athens Regional, 3–2
- Conference: Atlantic Coast Conference
- CB: No. 26
- Record: 39–26 (14–10 ACC)
- Head coach: Jack Leggett
- Home stadium: Doug Kingsmore Stadium

2004 Atlantic Coast Conference baseball standings
| | Conf. | | | | Overall |
| Team | W | | L | PCT | W | | L | PCT |
|---|---|---|---|---|---|---|---|---|
| No. 11 Georgia Tech ‍†‍‍^{y} | 18 | – | 5 | .783 | 44 | – | 21 | .677 |
| No. 20 Virginia ‍‍‍^{y} | 18 | – | 6 | .750 | 44 | – | 15 | .746 |
| No. 14 Florida State ‍‍‡‍^{y} | 16 | – | 8 | .667 | 45 | – | 23 | .662 |
| No. 27 North Carolina ^{y} ‍‍‍ | 14 | – | 10 | .583 | 43 | – | 21 | .672 |
| No. 26 Clemson ‍‍‍^{y} | 14 | – | 10 | .583 | 39 | – | 26 | .600 |
| NC State ‍‍‍^{y} | 11 | – | 12 | .478 | 36 | – | 24 | .600 |
| Duke ‍‍‍ | 8 | – | 16 | .333 | 25 | – | 31 | .446 |
| Maryland ‍‍‍ | 4 | – | 20 | .167 | 22 | – | 34 | .393 |
| Wake Forest ‍‍‍ | 4 | – | 20 | .167 | 17 | – | 33 | .340 |
† – Conference champion ‡ – Tournament champion y – Invited to the NCAA tournament As of June 30, 2004; Rankings from Collegiate Baseball

=== Roster ===
2004 Clemson Tigers roster
| - Brady Everett; - C. J. Gaddis; - Zane Green; - Ryan Hub; - John Ingram; - Gene Pierce; - Daniel Pritchard | **Pitchers**: - Jason Berken; - Josh Cribb; - Stephen Faris; - Jeff Hahn; - Kris Harvey - Sophomore; - Patrick Hogan; - Steven Jackson; - Tyler Lumsden - Junior; - Collin Mahoney; - Robert Rohrbaugh - Sophomore | **Catchers**: - Lou Santangelo - Junior; **Infielders**: - Andy D'Alessio - Freshman; - Herman Demmink - Sophomore; - Brad McCann - Junior; - Russell Triplett - RS Senior | **Outfielders**: - Tyler Colvin; - Garrick Evans - Junior; - Tony Sipp - Junior; - Travis Storrer - Sophomore |

=== Schedule ===
Legend
| | Clemson win |
| | Clemson loss |
| **Bold** | Clemson team member |
| * | Non-Conference game |

2004 Clemson Tigers baseball game log
Regular season

February
| Date | Opponent | Rank | Site/stadium | Score | Overall record | ACC record |
|---|---|---|---|---|---|---|
| Feb 24 | Charlotte* | No. 17 | Doug Kingsmore Stadium • Clemson, SC | **L** 4–5 | 0–1 | |
| Feb 28 | vs Georgia Southern* | No. 17 | Greenville, NC | **W** 4–0 | 1–1 | |
| Feb 28 | at East Carolina* | No. 17 | Greenville, NC | **L** 2–3^{11} | 1–2 | |
| Feb 29 | vs Georgia Southern* | No. 17 | Greenville, NC | **W** 9–0 | 2–2 | |
| Feb 29 | at East Carolina* | No. 17 | Greenville, NC | **L** 4–6 | 2–3 | |

March
| Date | Opponent | Rank | Site/stadium | Score | Overall record | ACC record |
|---|---|---|---|---|---|---|
| Mar 3 | Gardner–Webb* | No. 29 | Doug Kingsmore Stadium • Clemson, SC | **W** 8–5 | 3–3 | |
| Mar 5 | at College of Charleston* | No. 29 | CofC Baseball Stadium at Patriots Point • Mount Pleasant, SC | **W** 15–4 | 3–4 | |
| Mar 6 | at No. 5 South Carolina* | No. 29 | Sarge Frye Field • Columbia, SC | **L** 2–5 | 3–5 | |
| Mar 7 | No. 4 South Carolina* | No. 29 | Doug Kingsmore Stadium • Clemson, SC | **L** 7–8^{10} | 3–6 | |
| Mar 10 | at Wofford* | | Russell C. King Field • Spartanburg, SC | **W** 6–0 | 4–6 | |
| Mar 12 | Auburn* | | Doug Kingsmore Stadium • Clemson, SC | **W** 14–9 | 5–6 | |
| Mar 13 | Auburn* | | Doug Kingsmore Stadium • Clemson, SC | **L** 4–5 | 5–7 | |
| Mar 14 | Auburn* | | Doug Kingsmore Stadium • Clemson, SC | **L** 6–9 | 5–8 | |
| Mar 16 | Coastal Carolina* | | Doug Kingsmore Stadium • Clemson, SC | **W** 9–4 | 6–8 | |
| Mar 19 | at Texas Tech* | | Dan Law Field • Lubbock, TX | **W** 7–3 | 7–8 | |
| Mar 20 | at Texas Tech* | | Dan Law Field • Lubbock, TX | **L** 10–13 | 7–9 | |
| Mar 21 | at Texas Tech* | | Dan Law Field • Lubbock, TX | **L** 3–5 | 7–10 | |
| Mar 23 | Elon* | | Doug Kingsmore Stadium • Clemson, SC | **W** 10–6 | 8–10 | |
| Mar 24 | Elon* | | Doug Kingsmore Stadium • Clemson, SC | **L** 1–7 | 8–11 | |
| Mar 26 | Wake Forest | | Doug Kingsmore Stadium • Clemson, SC | **W** 13–6 | 9–11 | 1–0 |
| Mar 27 | Wake Forest | | Doug Kingsmore Stadium • Clemson, SC | **W** 7–4 | 10–11 | 2–0 |
| Mar 28 | Wake Forest | | Doug Kingsmore Stadium • Clemson, SC | **W** 6–5 | 11–11 | 3–0 |
| Mar 30 | at Georgia* | | Foley Field • Athens, GA | **W** 6–2 | 12–11 | |
| Mar 31 | Georgia* | | Doug Kingsmore Stadium • Clemson, SC | **W** 19–4 | 13–11 | |

April
| Date | Opponent | Rank | Site/stadium | Score | Overall record | ACC record |
|---|---|---|---|---|---|---|
| Apr 2 | Maryland | | Doug Kingsmore Stadium • Clemson, SC | **W** 3–2 | 14–11 | 4–0 |
| Apr 3 | Maryland | | Doug Kingsmore Stadium • Clemson, SC | **W** 9–2 | 15–11 | 5–0 |
| Apr 4 | Maryland | | Doug Kingsmore Stadium • Clemson, SC | **W** 8–2 | 16–11 | 6–0 |
| Apr 7 | No. 9 South Carolina* | No. 23 | Doug Kingsmore Stadium • Clemson, SC | **W** 9–4 | 17–11 | |
| Apr 9 | at Virginia | No. 29 | Davenport Field • Charlottesville, VA | **L** 1–5 | 17–12 | 6–1 |
| Apr 10 | at Virginia | No. 29 | Davenport Field • Charlottesville, VA | **L** 3–4 | 17–13 | 6–2 |
| Apr 10 | at Virginia | No. 29 | Davenport Field • Charlottesville, VA | **L** 1–3 | 17–14 | 6–3 |
| Apr 13 | Winthrop* | | Doug Kingsmore Stadium • Clemson, SC | **W** 9–5 | 18–14 | |
| Apr 14 | at No. 13 South Carolina* | | Sarge Frye Field • Columbia, SC | **W** 13–5 | 19–14 | |
| Apr 16 | at No. 10 North Carolina | | Boshamer Stadium • Chapel Hill, NC | **W** 2–1 | 20–14 | 7–3 |
| Apr 17 | at No. 10 North Carolina | | Boshamer Stadium • Chapel Hill, NC | **L** 0–4 | 20–15 | 7–4 |
| Apr 18 | at No. 10 North Carolina | | Boshamer Stadium • Chapel Hill, NC | **W** 4–2^{10} | 21–15 | 8–4 |
| Apr 20 | The Citadel* | No. 17 | Doug Kingsmore Stadium • Clemson, SC | **W** 13–4 | 22–15 | |
| Apr 21 | Western Carolina* | No. 17 | Doug Kingsmore Stadium • Clemson, SC | **W** 8–7 | 23–15 | |
| Apr 23 | No. 28 NC State | No. 17 | Doug Kingsmore Stadium • Clemson, SC | **W** 2–1 | 24–15 | 9–4 |
| Apr 24 | No. 28 NC State | No. 17 | Doug Kingsmore Stadium • Clemson, SC | **W** 4–3 | 25–15 | 10–4 |
| Apr 25 | No. 28 NC State | No. 17 | Doug Kingsmore Stadium • Clemson, SC | **W** 4–3 | 26–15 | 11–4 |

May
| Date | Opponent | Rank | Site/stadium | Score | Overall record | ACC record |
|---|---|---|---|---|---|---|
| May 1 | No. 24 Florida State | No. 11 | Doug Kingsmore Stadium • Clemson, SC | **L** 6–11 | 26–16 | 11–5 |
| May 2 | No. 24 Florida State | No. 11 | Doug Kingsmore Stadium • Clemson, SC | **L** 1–10 | 26–17 | 11–6 |
| May 3 | No. 24 Florida State | No. 13 | Doug Kingsmore Stadium • Clemson, SC | **W** 18–9 | 27–17 | 12–6 |
| May 5 | Charleston Southern* | No. 13 | Doug Kingsmore Stadium • Clemson, SC | **W** 3–2 | 28–17 | |
| May 7 | No. 30 UCF* | No. 13 | Doug Kingsmore Stadium • Clemson, SC | **W** 8–5 | 29–17 | |
| May 8 | No. 30 UCF* | No. 13 | Doug Kingsmore Stadium • Clemson, SC | **L** 4–7 | 29–18 | |
| May 9 | No. 30 UCF* | No. 13 | Doug Kingsmore Stadium • Clemson, SC | **L** 2–3 | 29–19 | |
| May 11 | Furman* | No. 20 | Doug Kingsmore Stadium • Clemson, SC | **W** 16–5 | 30–19 | |
| May 12 | No. 26 College of Charleston* | No. 20 | Doug Kingsmore Stadium • Clemson, SC | **W** 19–8 | 31–19 | |
| May 14 | at No. 15 Georgia Tech | No. 20 | Russ Chandler Stadium • Atlanta, GA | **L** 3–8 | 31–20 | 12–7 |
| May 15 | at No. 15 Georgia Tech | No. 20 | Russ Chandler Stadium • Atlanta, GA | **L** 3–11 | 31–21 | 12–8 |
| May 16 | at No. 15 Georgia Tech | No. 20 | Russ Chandler Stadium • Atlanta, GA | **L** 4–8 | 31–22 | 12–9 |
| May 20 | at Duke | No. 28 | Jack Coombs Field • Durham, NC | **W** 10–1 | 32–22 | 13–9 |
| May 21 | at Duke | No. 28 | Jack Coombs Field • Durham, NC | **L** 1–2 | 32–23 | 13–10 |
| May 22 | at Duke | No. 28 | Jack Coombs Field • Durham, NC | **W** 9–6 | 33–23 | 14–10 |

Postseason

ACC Tournament
| Date | Opponent | Rank | Site/stadium | Score | Overall record | ACCT Record |
|---|---|---|---|---|---|---|
| May 26 | No. 23 (5) North Carolina | No. 22 (4) | Salem Memorial Ballpark • Salem, VA | **W** 7–6 | 34–23 | 1–0 |
| May 27 | No. 5 (1) Georgia Tech | No. 22 (4) | Salem Memorial Ballpark • Salem, VA | **L** 7–11^{11} | 34–24 | 1–1 |
| May 28 | No. 30 (6) NC State | No. 22 (4) | Salem Memorial Ballpark • Salem, VA | **W** 12–1 | 35–24 | 2–1 |
| May 28 | No. 23 (5) North Carolina | No. 22 (4) | Salem Memorial Ballpark • Salem, VA | **L** 5–6 | 35–25 | 2–2 |

NCAA Athens Regional
| Date | Opponent | Rank | Site/stadium | Score | Overall record | Regional Record |
|---|---|---|---|---|---|---|
| June 4 | (3) Birmingham–Southern | No. 22 (2) | Foley Field • Athens, GA | **W** 10–6 | 36–25 | 1–0 |
| June 5 | (1) Georgia | No. 22 (2) | Foley Field • Athens, GA | **L** 3–6 | 36–26 | 1–1 |
| June 5 | (3) Birmingham–Southern | No. 22 (2) | Foley Field • Athens, GA | **W** 5–4 | 37–26 | 2–1 |
| June 6 | (1) Georgia | No. 22 (2) | Foley Field • Athens, GA | **W** 10–9 | 38–26 | 3–1 |
| June 6 | (1) Georgia | No. 22 (2) | Foley Field • Athens, GA | **L** 6–7^{10} | 38–27 | 3–2 |

=== Rankings ===
Ranking movements Legend: ██ Increase in ranking ██ Decrease in ranking — = Not ranked
| | Week | | | | | | | | | | | | | | | | | | | | |
| Poll | Pre | 1 | 2 | 3 | 4 | 5 | 6 | 7 | 8 | 9 | 10 | 11 | 12 | 13 | 14 | 15 | 16 | 17 | 18 | 19 | Final |
|---|---|---|---|---|---|---|---|---|---|---|---|---|---|---|---|---|---|---|---|---|---|
| Coaches' | | * | | | | | | | | | | | | | | | | | | | — |
| Baseball America | | | | | | | | | | | | | | | | | | | | | — |
| Collegiate Baseball^ | 17 | 17 | 17 | 17 | 29 | — | — | — | — | 23 | — | 17 | 11 | 13 | 20 | 28 | 22 | 22 | 26 | 26 | 26 |
| NCBWA† | 14 | 14 | 13 | 13 | 26 | 31 | — | — | — | 31 | — | — | 27 | — | — | — | — | — | —* | —* | — |

^ Collegiate Baseball ranked 40 teams in their preseason poll, but only ranked 30 teams weekly during the season.
† NCBWA ranks 30 teams in their preseason poll, but only ranks 25 teams weekly during the season.
* A new poll was not released for this week, so for comparison purposes, the previous week's ranking is inserted in this week's slot.

== 2005 ==
2005 Clemson Tigers baseball

Clemson Regional champions

Waco Super Regional, 1–2
- Conference: Atlantic Coast Conference

Ranking
- Coaches: No. 14
- CB: No. 13
- Record: 39–22 (15–9 ACC)
- Head coach: Jack Leggett
- Home stadium: Doug Kingsmore Stadium

2005 Atlantic Coast Conference baseball standings
| | Conf. | | | | Overall |
| Team | W | | L | PCT | W | | L | PCT |
|---|---|---|---|---|---|---|---|---|
| No. 10 Georgia Tech ^{†‡y} ‍‍‍ | 22 | – | 8 | .733 | 45 | – | 19 | .703 |
| No. 13 Clemson ‍‍‍^{y} | 21 | – | 9 | .700 | 43 | – | 23 | .652 |
| No. 14 Miami (FL) ‍‍‍^{y} | 19 | – | 10 | .655 | 41 | – | 19 | .683 |
| No. 15 Florida State ‍‍‍^{y} | 19 | – | 11 | .633 | 53 | – | 20 | .726 |
| No. 21 North Carolina ‍‍‍^{y} | 17 | – | 10 | .630 | 41 | – | 19 | .683 |
| NC State ‍‍‍^{y} | 17 | – | 13 | .567 | 41 | – | 19 | .683 |
| Virginia ‍‍‍^{y} | 14 | – | 14 | .500 | 41 | – | 20 | .672 |
| Wake Forest ‍‍‍ | 12 | – | 18 | .400 | 28 | – | 30 | .483 |
| Virginia Tech ‍‍‍ | 7 | – | 19 | .269 | 23 | – | 28 | .451 |
| Maryland ‍‍‍ | 7 | – | 23 | .233 | 25 | – | 31 | .446 |
| Duke ‍‍‍ | 5 | – | 25 | .167 | 14 | – | 39 | .264 |
† – Conference champion ‡ – Tournament champion y – Invited to the NCAA tournament As of June 30, 2005; Rankings from Collegiate Baseball

=== Roster ===
2005 Clemson Tigers roster
| - Ben Hall; - Doug Hogan; - John Ingram; - Tanner Leggett; - Gene Pierce; - Daniel Pritchard; - David Williams | **Pitchers**: - Stephen Clyne; - Josh Cribb - Junior; - Stephen Faris; - Chris Fidrych; - Drew Fiorenza; - Jeff Hahn; - Kris Harvey - Junior; - Chris Howard; - David Kopp; - Daniel Moskos; - Robert Rohrbaugh - Junior; - P. J. Zocchi | **Catchers**: - Adrian Casanova - Junior; **Infielders**: - Andy D'Alessio - Sophomore; - Herman Demmink - Junior; - Taylor Harbin - Freshman; - Stan Widmann - Freshman | **Outfielders**: - Brad Chalk - Freshman; - Tyler Colvin - Sophomore; - Travis Storrer - Junior |

=== Schedule ===
Legend
| | Clemson win |
| | Clemson loss |
| **Bold** | Clemson team member |
| * | Non-Conference game |

2005 Clemson Tigers baseball game log
Regular season

February
| Date | Opponent | Rank | Site/stadium | Score | Overall record | ACC record |
|---|---|---|---|---|---|---|
| Feb 18 | vs West Virginia* | No. 21 | Charles Watson Stadium • Conway, SC | **W** 7–2 | 1–0 | |
| Feb 19 | at Coastal Carolina* | No. 21 | Charles Watson Stadium • Conway, SC | **L** 2–3 | 1–1 | |
| Feb 20 | vs East Carolina* | No. 21 | Charles Watson Stadium • Conway, SC | **L** 0–10 | 1–2 | |
| Feb 25 | No. 20 UC Irvine* | | Doug Kingsmore Stadium • Clemson, SC | **W** 3–2 | 2–2 | |
| Feb 26 | No. 20 UC Irvine* | | Doug Kingsmore Stadium • Clemson, SC | **W** 5–4 | 3–2 | |
| Feb 27 | No. 20 UC Irvine* | | Doug Kingsmore Stadium • Clemson, SC | **W** 10–2 | 4–2 | |

March
| Date | Opponent | Rank | Site/stadium | Score | Overall record | ACC record |
|---|---|---|---|---|---|---|
| Mar 4 | at Auburn* | No. 24 | Plainsman Park • Auburn, AL | **L** 5–6 | 4–3 | |
| Mar 5 | at Auburn* | No. 24 | Plainsman Park • Auburn, AL | **L** 4–8 | 4–4 | |
| Mar 6 | at Auburn* | No. 24 | Plainsman Park • Auburn, AL | **W** 14–3 | 5–4 | |
| Mar 9 | Winthrop* | | Doug Kingsmore Stadium • Clemson, SC | **L** 2–8 | 5–5 | |
| Mar 12 | No. 4 South Carolina* | | Doug Kingsmore Stadium • Clemson, SC | **L** 3–6 | 5–6 | |
| Mar 13 | at No. 4 South Carolina* | | Sarge Frye Field • Columbia, SC | **L** 5–6 | 5–7 | |
| Mar 16 | Furman* | | Doug Kingsmore Stadium • Clemson, SC | **W** 11–1 | 6–7 | |
| Mar 18 | No. 9 North Carolina | | Doug Kingsmore Stadium • Clemson, SC | **L** 1–2 | 6–8 | 0–1 |
| Mar 19 | No. 9 North Carolina | | Doug Kingsmore Stadium • Clemson, SC | **W** 9–1 | 7–8 | 1–1 |
| Mar 20 | No. 9 North Carolina | | Doug Kingsmore Stadium • Clemson, SC | **W** 7–3 | 8–8 | 2–1 |
| Mar 22 | at Old Dominion* | | Bud Metheny Baseball Complex • Norfolk, VA | **W** 1–0 | 9–8 | |
| Mar 23 | at Old Dominion* | | Bud Metheny Baseball Complex • Norfolk, VA | **L** 2–3 | 9–9 | |
| Mar 25 | at Maryland | | Shipley Field • College Park, MD | **W** 14–3 | 10–9 | 3–1 |
| Mar 26 | at Maryland | | Shipley Field • College Park, MD | **W** 6–4^{13} | 11–9 | 4–1 |
| Mar 26 | at Maryland | | Shipley Field • College Park, MD | **W** 12–0 | 12–9 | 5–1 |
| Mar 29 | No. 25 Coastal Carolina* | | Doug Kingsmore Stadium • Clemson, SC | **W** 14–5 | 13–9 | |
| Mar 30 | No. 25 Coastal Carolina* | | Doug Kingsmore Stadium • Clemson, SC | **W** 8–1 | 14–9 | |

April
| Date | Opponent | Rank | Site/stadium | Score | Overall record | ACC record |
|---|---|---|---|---|---|---|
| Apr 2 | at No. 6 Florida State | | Mike Martin Field at Dick Howser Stadium • Tallahassee, FL | **L** 1–3 | 14–10 | 5–2 |
| Apr 3 | at No. 6 Florida State | | Mike Martin Field at Dick Howser Stadium • Tallahassee, FL | **L** 4–5 | 14–11 | 5–3 |
| Apr 3 | at No. 6 Florida State | | Mike Martin Field at Dick Howser Stadium • Tallahassee, FL | **W** 7–3 | 15–11 | 6–3 |
| Apr 5 | at Georgia* | | Foley Field • Athens, GA | **L** 10–11 | 15–12 | |
| Apr 6 | Georgia* | | Doug Kingsmore Stadium • Clemson, SC | **L** 1–4 | 15–13 | |
| Apr 8 | Duke | | Doug Kingsmore Stadium • Clemson, SC | **W** 9–3 | 16–13 | 7–3 |
| Apr 9 | Duke | | Doug Kingsmore Stadium • Clemson, SC | **W** 11–6 | 17–13 | 8–3 |
| Apr 10 | Duke | | Doug Kingsmore Stadium • Clemson, SC | **W** 16–6 | 18–13 | 9–3 |
| Apr 12 | at Western Carolina* | | Hennon Stadium • Cullowhee, NC | **W** 7–4 | 19–13 | |
| Apr 13 | No. 5 South Carolina* | | Doug Kingsmore Stadium • Clemson, SC | **W** 12–2 | 20–13 | |
| Apr 15 | Virginia | | Doug Kingsmore Stadium • Clemson, SC | **W** 13–4 | 21–13 | 10–3 |
| Apr 16 | Virginia | | Doug Kingsmore Stadium • Clemson, SC | **W** 3–2 | 22–13 | 11–3 |
| Apr 17 | Virginia | | Doug Kingsmore Stadium • Clemson, SC | **L** 2–9 | 22–14 | 11–4 |
| Apr 19 | Western Carolina* | | Doug Kingsmore Stadium • Clemson, SC | **W** 10–1 | 23–14 | |
| Apr 20 | at No. 13 South Carolina* | | Sarge Frye Field • Columbia, SC | **W** 7–5 | 24–14 | |
| Apr 22 | at NC State | | Doak Field • Raleigh, NC | **L** 3–8 | 24–15 | 11–5 |
| Apr 23 | at NC State | | Doak Field • Raleigh, NC | **W** 16–9 | 25–15 | 12–5 |
| Apr 24 | at NC State | | Doak Field • Raleigh, NC | **L** 8–9 | 25–16 | 12–6 |
| Apr 26 | Elon* | | Doug Kingsmore Stadium • Clemson, SC | **W** 9–6 | 26–16 | |
| Apr 27 | Wofford* | | Doug Kingsmore Stadium • Clemson, SC | **W** 7–1 | 27–16 | |
| Apr 29 | No. 6 Georgia Tech | | Doug Kingsmore Stadium • Clemson, SC | **L** 14–18 | 27–17 | 12–7 |
| Apr 30 | No. 6 Georgia Tech | | Doug Kingsmore Stadium • Clemson, SC | **W** 6–5 | 28–17 | 13–7 |

May
| Date | Opponent | Rank | Site/stadium | Score | Overall record | ACC record |
|---|---|---|---|---|---|---|
| May 1 | No. 6 Georgia Tech | | Doug Kingsmore Stadium • Clemson, SC | **L** 4–6 | 28–18 | 13–8 |
| May 8 | at Virginia Tech | | English Field • Blacksburg, VA | **L** 7–11 | 28–19 | 13–9 |
| May 9 | at Virginia Tech | | English Field • Blacksburg, VA | **W** 7–0 | 29–19 | 14–9 |
| May 10 | at Virginia Tech | | English Field • Blacksburg, VA | **W** 6–2 | 30–19 | 15–9 |
| May 13 | at Wake Forest | | Gene Hooks Stadium • Winston-Salem, NC | **W** 4–1 | 31–19 | 16–9 |
| May 14 | at Wake Forest | | Gene Hooks Stadium • Winston-Salem, NC | **W** 17–14^{11}> | 32–19 | 17–9 |
| May 15 | at Wake Forest | | Gene Hooks Stadium • Winston-Salem, NC | **W** 6–5 | 33–19 | 18–9 |
| May 17 | No. 20 College of Charleston* | No. 24 | Doug Kingsmore Stadium • Clemson, SC | **W** 8–5 | 34–19 | |
| May 19 | No. 7 Miami (FL) | No. 24 | Doug Kingsmore Stadium • Clemson, SC | **W** 15–5 | 35–19 | 19–9 |
| May 20 | No. 7 Miami (FL) | No. 24 | Doug Kingsmore Stadium • Clemson, SC | **W** 9–2 | 36–19 | 20–9 |
| May 21 | No. 7 Miami (FL) | No. 24 | Doug Kingsmore Stadium • Clemson, SC | **W** 6–2 | 37–19 | 21–9 |

Postseason

ACC Tournament
| Date | Opponent | Rank | Site/stadium | Score | Overall record | ACCT Record |
|---|---|---|---|---|---|---|
| May 25 | Virginia | No. 12 (2) | Baseball Grounds of Jacksonville • Jacksonville, FL | **L** 1–8 | 37–20 | 0–1 |
| May 26 | No. 13 Miami (FL) | No. 12 (2) | Baseball Grounds of Jacksonville • Jacksonville, FL | **W** 9–1 | 38–20 | 1–1 |
| May 27 | No. 26 NC State | No. 12 (2) | Baseball Grounds of Jacksonville • Jacksonville, FL | **W** 5–4 | 39–20 | 2–1 |
| May 28 | Virginia | No. 12 (2) | Baseball Grounds of Jacksonville • Jacksonville, FL | **L** 4–5 | 39–21 | 2–2 |

NCAA Clemson Regional
| Date | Opponent | Rank | Site/stadium | Score | Overall record | Regional Record |
|---|---|---|---|---|---|---|
| June 3 | (4) North Carolina A&T | No. 12 (1) | Doug Kingsmore Stadium • Clemson, SC | **W** 12–2 | 40–21 | 1–0 |
| June 4 | No. 22 (2) College of Charleston | No. 12 (1) | Doug Kingsmore Stadium • Clemson, SC | **W** 6–0 | 41–21 | 2–0 |
| June 5 | (3) Oral Roberts | No. 12 (1) | Doug Kingsmore Stadium • Clemson, SC | **W** 8–3 | 42–21 | 3–0 |

NCAA Waco Super Regional
| Date | Opponent | Rank | Site/stadium | Score | Overall record | SR Record |
|---|---|---|---|---|---|---|
| June 11 | No. 6 (4) Baylor | No. 12 | Baylor Ballpark • Waco, TX | **W** 4–2 | 43–21 | 1–0 |
| June 12 | No. 6 (4) Baylor | No. 12 | Baylor Ballpark • Waco, TX | **L** 1–7 | 43–22 | 1–1 |
| June 13 | No. 6 (4) Baylor | No. 12 | Baylor Ballpark • Waco, TX | **L** 1–6 | 43–23 | 1–2 |

=== Rankings ===
Ranking movements Legend: ██ Increase in ranking ██ Decrease in ranking — = Not ranked
| | Week | | | | | | | | | | | | | | | | | | | | |
| Poll | Pre | 1 | 2 | 3 | 4 | 5 | 6 | 7 | 8 | 9 | 10 | 11 | 12 | 13 | 14 | 15 | 16 | 17 | 18 | 19 | Final |
|---|---|---|---|---|---|---|---|---|---|---|---|---|---|---|---|---|---|---|---|---|---|
| Coaches' | | * | | | | | | | | | | | | | | | | | | | 14 |
| Baseball America | | | | | | | | | | | | | | | | | | | | | 14 |
| Collegiate Baseball^ | 21 | 21 | 21 | — | 24 | — | — | — | — | — | — | — | — | — | — | 24 | 12 | 12 | 12 | 13 | 13 |
| NCBWA† | 23 | 23 | 23 | — | 26 | 33 | — | — | — | — | — | — | — | — | — | — | 31 | 31 | 18 | 17 | 17 |

^ Collegiate Baseball ranked 40 teams in their preseason poll, but only ranked 30 teams weekly during the season.
† NCBWA ranks 30 teams in their preseason poll, but only ranks 25 teams weekly during the season.
* A new poll was not released for this week, so for comparison purposes, the previous week's ranking is inserted in this week's slot.

== 2007 ==
2007 Clemson Tigers baseball

Myrtle Beach Regional champions

Starkville Super Regional, 0–2
- Conference: Atlantic Coast Conference
- Atlantic
- Record: 41–23 (18–12 ACC)
- Head coach: Jack Leggett
- Home stadium: Doug Kingsmore Stadium

2007 Atlantic Coast Conference baseball standings
| | Conf. | | | | Overall |
| Team | W | | L | PCT | W | | L | PCT |
|---|---|---|---|---|---|---|---|---|
Atlantic
| No. 10 Florida State ^{x}‍‍‍^{y} | 24 | – | 6 | .800 | 49 | – | 13 | .790 |
| No. 12 Clemson ‍‍‍^{y} | 18 | – | 12 | .600 | 41 | – | 23 | .641 |
| NC State ‍‍‍^{y} | 16 | – | 14 | .533 | 38 | – | 23 | .623 |
| Wake Forest ‍‍‍^{y} | 14 | – | 16 | .467 | 34 | – | 29 | .540 |
| Boston College ‍‍‍ | 12 | – | 17 | .414 | 24 | – | 27 | .471 |
| Maryland ‍‍‍ | 7 | – | 23 | .233 | 26 | – | 30 | .464 |
Coastal
| No. 2 North Carolina ^{x‡y} ‍‍‍ | 21 | – | 9 | .700 | 57 | – | 16 | .781 |
| No. 15 Virginia ‍‍‍^{y} | 19 | – | 9 | .679 | 45 | – | 16 | .738 |
| Miami (FL) ‍‍‍^{y} | 17 | – | 13 | .567 | 37 | – | 24 | .607 |
| Georgia Tech ‍‍‍ | 15 | – | 14 | .517 | 32 | – | 25 | .561 |
| Duke ‍‍‍ | 8 | – | 22 | .267 | 29 | – | 25 | .537 |
| Virginia Tech ‍‍‍ | 7 | – | 23 | .233 | 23 | – | 31 | .426 |
x – Division champion ‡ – Tournament champion y – Invited to the NCAA tournament As of June 30, 2007; Rankings from Collegiate Baseball

=== Roster ===
2007 Clemson Tigers roster
| - David Bunnell; - Alex Burg; - Stephen Clyne; - Alan Farina; - Alex Lee; - Tim Morris; - Buddy Munroe; - Matt Vaughn; - Adam Ward; - Stan Widmann | **Pitchers**: - William Bond; - Chris Fidrych; - Ryan Hinson - Freshman; - David Kopp - Junior; - Alex Martin; - D. J. Mitchell; - Daniel Moskos - Junior; - Justin Sarratt; - Brock Schnabel; - Josh Thrailkill; - P. J. Zocchi; - Matt Zoltak | **Catchers**: - Doug Hogan - Junior; **Infielders**: - J. D. Burgess - Freshman; - Andy D'Alessio - Senior; - Taylor Harbin - Junior; - Marquez Smith - Senior | **Outfielders**: - Wilson Boyd - Freshman; - Brad Chalk - Junior; - Addison Johnson - Freshman; - Ben Paulsen |

=== Schedule ===
Legend
| | Clemson win |
| | Clemson loss |
| **Bold** | Clemson team member |
| * | Non-Conference game |

2007 Clemson Tigers baseball game log
Regular season

February
| Date | Opponent | Rank | Site/stadium | Score | Overall record | ACC record |
|---|---|---|---|---|---|---|
| Feb 16 | George Mason* | No. 1 | Doug Kingsmore Stadium • Clemson, SC | **W** 14–0 | 1–0 | |
| Feb 17 | George Mason* | No. 1 | Doug Kingsmore Stadium • Clemson, SC | **L** 1–5 | 1–1 | |
| Feb 18 | George Mason* | No. 1 | Doug Kingsmore Stadium • Clemson, SC | **W** 5–4 | 2–1 | |
| Feb 21 | High Point* | No. 5 | Doug Kingsmore Stadium • Clemson, SC | **W** 11–3^{6} | 3–1 | |
| Feb 23 | Pacific* | No. 5 | Doug Kingsmore Stadium • Clemson, SC | **W** 8–3 | 4–1 | |
| Feb 24 | Pacific* | No. 5 | Doug Kingsmore Stadium • Clemson, SC | **W** 4–3^{11} | 5–1 | |
| Feb 24 | Pacific* | No. 5 | Doug Kingsmore Stadium • Clemson, SC | **W** 5–4 | 6–1 | |
| Feb 28 | Winthrop* | No. 5 | Doug Kingsmore Stadium • Clemson, SC | **W** 6–4 | 7–1 | |

March
| Date | Opponent | Rank | Site/stadium | Score | Overall record | ACC record |
|---|---|---|---|---|---|---|
| Mar 3 | No. 4 South Carolina* | No. 5 | Doug Kingsmore Stadium • Clemson, SC | **L** 0–12 | 7–2 | |
| Mar 4 | at No. 4 South Carolina* | No. 5 | Sarge Frye Field • Columbia, SC | **L** 2–3 | 7–3 | |
| Mar 7 | No. 29 Coastal Carolina* | No. 6 | Doug Kingsmore Stadium • Clemson, SC | **W** 4–0 | 8–3 | |
| Mar 9 | Memphis* | No. 6 | Doug Kingsmore Stadium • Clemson, SC | **L** 4–6^{10} | 8–4 | |
| Mar 10 | Memphis* | No. 6 | Doug Kingsmore Stadium • Clemson, SC | **W** 8–2 | 9–4 | |
| Mar 11 | Memphis* | No. 6 | Doug Kingsmore Stadium • Clemson, SC | **W** 7–2 | 10–4 | |
| Mar 14 | Georgia Southern* | No. 6 | Doug Kingsmore Stadium • Clemson, SC | **W** 3–0 | 11–4 | |
| Mar 16 | Duke | No. 6 | Doug Kingsmore Stadium • Clemson, SC | **W** 6–4 | 12–4 | 1–0 |
| Mar 17 | Duke | No. 6 | Doug Kingsmore Stadium • Clemson, SC | **W** 7–2 | 13–4 | 2–0 |
| Mar 18 | Duke | No. 6 | Doug Kingsmore Stadium • Clemson, SC | **W** 9–6 | 14–4 | 3–0 |
| Mar 20 | at Western Carolina* | No. 6 | Hennon Stadium • Cullowhee, NC | **L** 3–6 | 14–5 | |
| Mar 23 | at Maryland | No. 6 | Shipley Field • College Park, MD | **L** 3–4 | 14–6 | 3–1 |
| Mar 24 | at Maryland | No. 6 | Shipley Field • College Park, MD | **L** 1–4 | 14–7 | 3–2 |
| Mar 25 | at Maryland | No. 6 | Shipley Field • College Park, MD | **W** 5–0 | 15–7 | 4–2 |
| Mar 27 | Gardner–Webb* | No. 12 | Doug Kingsmore Stadium • Clemson, SC | **W** 14–2 | 16–7 | |
| Mar 28 | Western Carolina* | No. 12 | Doug Kingsmore Stadium • Clemson, SC | **W** 15–6 | 17–7 | |
| Mar 30 | Miami (FL) | No. 12 | Doug Kingsmore Stadium • Clemson, SC | **L** 3–10 | 17–8 | 4–3 |
| Mar 31 | Miami (FL) | No. 12 | Doug Kingsmore Stadium • Clemson, SC | **W** 4–1 | 18–8 | 5–3 |

April
| Date | Opponent | Rank | Site/stadium | Score | Overall record | ACC record |
|---|---|---|---|---|---|---|
| Apr 1 | Miami (FL) | No. 12 | Doug Kingsmore Stadium • Clemson, SC | **L** 6–7 | 18–9 | 5–4 |
| Apr 3 | at Georgia* | No. 16 | Foley Field • Athens, GA | **W** 4–2 | 19–9 | |
| Apr 4 | Georgia* | No. 16 | Doug Kingsmore Stadium • Clemson, SC | **W** 11–10 | 20–9 | |
| Apr 6 | at Virginia Tech | No. 16 | English Field • Blacksburg, VA | **W** 6–3 | 21–9 | 6–4 |
| Apr 7 | at Virginia Tech | No. 16 | English Field • Blacksburg, VA | **W** 8–5 | 22–9 | 7–4 |
| Apr 8 | at Virginia Tech | No. 16 | English Field • Blacksburg, VA | **W** 5–2^{10} | 23–9 | 8–4 |
| Apr 13 | at Wake Forest | No. 14 | Gene Hooks Stadium • Winston-Salem, NC | **W** 6–2 | 24–9 | 9–4 |
| Apr 14 | at Wake Forest | No. 14 | Gene Hooks Stadium • Winston-Salem, NC | **L** 5–6 | 24–10 | 9–5 |
| Apr 15 | at Wake Forest | No. 14 | Gene Hooks Stadium • Winston-Salem, NC | **W** 5–4 | 25–10 | 10–5 |
| Apr 18 | at No. 5 South Carolina* | No. 13 | Sarge Frye Field • Columbia, SC | **L** 2–4 | 25–11 | |
| Apr 20 | No. 8 Virginia | No. 13 | Doug Kingsmore Stadium • Clemson, SC | **L** 3–5 | 25–12 | 10–6 |
| Apr 21 | No. 8 Virginia | No. 13 | Doug Kingsmore Stadium • Clemson, SC | **L** 0–3 | 25–13 | 10–7 |
| Apr 22 | No. 8 Virginia | No. 13 | Doug Kingsmore Stadium • Clemson, SC | **W** 2–1 | 26–13 | 11–7 |
| Apr 24 | Elon* | No. 21 | Doug Kingsmore Stadium • Clemson, SC | **L** 12–13 | 26–14 | |
| Apr 25 | No. 10 South Carolina* | No. 21 | Doug Kingsmore Stadium • Clemson, SC | **W** 14–5 | 27–14 | |
| Apr 27 | No. 19 Georgia Tech | No. 21 | Doug Kingsmore Stadium • Clemson, SC | **W** 3–2^{11} | 28–14 | 12–7 |
| Apr 28 | No. 19 Georgia Tech | No. 21 | Doug Kingsmore Stadium • Clemson, SC | **W** 10–3 | 29–14 | 13–7 |
| Apr 29 | No. 19 Georgia Tech | No. 21 | Doug Kingsmore Stadium • Clemson, SC | **L** 3–6 | 29–15 | 13–8 |

May
| Date | Opponent | Rank | Site/stadium | Score | Overall record | ACC record | |
|---|---|---|---|---|---|---|---|
| May 5 | Boston College | No. 23 | Doug Kingsmore Stadium • Clemson, SC | **W** 4–3 | 30–15 | 14–8 | |
| May 6 | Boston College | No. 23 | Doug Kingsmore Stadium • Clemson, SC | **L** 6–8 | 30–16 | 14–9 | |
| May 6 | Boston College | No. 23 | Doug Kingsmore Stadium • Clemson, SC | **W** 7–6 | 31–16 | 15–9 | |
| May 8 | vs Wofford* | No. 23 | Fluor Field at the West End • Greenville, SC | **W** 12–3 | 32–16 | | |
| May 9 | Furman* | No. 23 | Doug Kingsmore Stadium • Clemson, SC | **L** 3–6 | 32–17 | | |
| May 11 | at No. 2 Florida State | No. 23 | Mike Martin Field at Dick Howser Stadium • Tallahassee, FL | **L** 1–11 | 32–18 | 15–10 | |
| May 12 | at No. 2 Florida State | | Mike Martin Field at Dick Howser Stadium • Tallahassee, FL | No. 23 | **W** 7–6 | 33–18 | 16–10 |
| May 13 | at No. 2 Florida State | | Mike Martin Field at Dick Howser Stadium • Tallahassee, FL | No. 23 | **W** 11–6 | 34–18 | 17–10 |
| May 15 | College of Charleston* | No. 15 | Doug Kingsmore Stadium • Clemson, SC | **W** 19–7 | 35–18 | | |
| May 17 | at NC State | No. 15 | Doak Field • Raleigh, NC | **L** 4–11 | 35–19 | 17–11 | |
| May 18 | at NC State | No. 15 | Doak Field • Raleigh, NC | **L** 5–6 | 35–20 | 17–12 | |
| May 19 | at NC State | No. 15 | Doak Field • Raleigh, NC | **W** 6–3 | 36–20 | 18–12 | |

Postseason

ACC Tournament
| Date | Opponent | Rank | Site/stadium | Score | Overall record | ACCT Record |
|---|---|---|---|---|---|---|
| May 23 | No. 25 (5) Miami (FL) | No. 15 (4) | Baseball Grounds of Jacksonville • Jacksonville, FL | **W** 5–4^{13} | 37–20 | 1–0 |
| May 25 | (8) Wake Forest | No. 15 (4) | Baseball Grounds of Jacksonville • Jacksonville, FL | **L** 2–3 | 37–21 | 1–1 |
| May 26 | No. 3 (1) Florida State | No. 15 (4) | Baseball Grounds of Jacksonville • Jacksonville, FL | **W** 5–1 | 38–21 | 2–1 |

NCAA Myrtle Beach Regional
| Date | Opponent | Rank | Site/stadium | Score | Overall record | Regional Record |
|---|---|---|---|---|---|---|
| June 1 | vs (3) St. John's | No. 13 (2) | BB&T Coastal Field • Myrtle Beach, SC | **W** 3–2 | 39–21 | 1–0 |
| June 3 | at No. 12 (1) Coastal Carolina | No. 13 | BB&T Coastal Field • Myrtle Beach, SC (2) | **W** 11–8 | 40–21 | 2–0 |
| June 4 | at No. 12 (1) Coastal Carolina | No. 13 | BB&T Coastal Field • Myrtle Beach, SC (2) | **W** 15–3 | 41–21 | 3–0 |

NCAA Starkville Super Regional
| Date | Opponent | Rank | Site/stadium | Score | Overall record | SR Record |
|---|---|---|---|---|---|---|
| June 8 | at No. 17 Mississippi State | No. 5 | Dudy Noble Field • Starkville, MS | **L** 6–8 | 41–22 | 0–1 |
| June 9 | at No. 17 Mississippi State | No. 5 | Dudy Noble Field • Starkville, MS | **L** 5–8 | 41–23 | |

=== Rankings ===
Ranking movements Legend: ██ Increase in ranking ██ Decrease in ranking ( ) = First-place votes
| | Week | | | | | | | | | | | | | | | | | | | | |
| Poll | Pre | 1 | 2 | 3 | 4 | 5 | 6 | 7 | 8 | 9 | 10 | 11 | 12 | 13 | 14 | 15 | 16 | 17 | 18 | 19 | Final |
|---|---|---|---|---|---|---|---|---|---|---|---|---|---|---|---|---|---|---|---|---|---|
| Coaches' | 2 (4) | 2 (4)* | 2* | 2* | 2* | 7 | 6 | 7 | 11 | 17 | 15 | 15 | 17 | 17 | 16 | 14 | 16 | 17 | 17* | 17* | 13 |
| Baseball America | 3 | 2 | 1 | 2 | 2 | 6 | 6 | 6 | 11 | 18 | 14 | 14 | 19 | 18 | 18 | 15 | 19 | 18 | 9 | 15 | 15 |
| Collegiate Baseball^ | 2 | 2 | 1 | 5 | 5 | 6 | 6 | 6 | 12 | 16 | 14 | 13 | 21 | 23 | 23 | 15 | 15 | 13 | 5 | 12 | 12 |
| NCBWA† | 2 | 2* | 2 | 4 | 4 | 7 | 6 | 6 | 11 | 16 | 13 | 13 | 17 | 14 | 16 | 15 | 18 | 16 | 10 | 14 | 14 |

^ Collegiate Baseball ranked 40 teams in their preseason poll, but only ranked 30 teams weekly during the season.
† NCBWA ranks 30 teams in their preseason poll, but only ranks 25 teams weekly during the season.
* A new poll was not released for this week, so for comparison purposes, the previous week's ranking is inserted in this week's slot.
