= 2001 ACC tournament =

2001 ACC tournament may refer to:

- 2001 ACC men's basketball tournament
- 2001 ACC women's basketball tournament
- 2001 ACC men's soccer tournament
- 2001 ACC women's soccer tournament
- 2001 Atlantic Coast Conference baseball tournament
- 2001 Atlantic Coast Conference softball tournament
