= Kris Harvey =

American baseball player (born 1984)

- Pitcher / Outfielder
- Born: January 5, 1984 (age 42); Catawba, North Carolina, U.S.
- Bats: Right Throws: Right
- Stats at Baseball Reference

Bryan Kristopher Harvey (born January 5, 1984) is an American professional baseball pitcher. He is the son of former Major League Baseball pitcher Bryan Harvey and the brother of major league pitcher Hunter Harvey.

== Amateur career ==
Prior to playing professionally, Harvey attended Bandys High School. He was drafted out of high school by the Atlanta Braves in the fifth round of the 2002 amateur draft, but he did not sign. He attended Clemson University. In his first year with Clemson, 2003, Harvey hit .276 in 29 at-bats. The next year, he batted .335 with eight home runs and 41 RBI in 54 games. After the 2004 season, he played collegiate summer baseball with the Falmouth Commodores of the Cape Cod Baseball League. In 2005, he hit .339 with 24 home runs and 69 RBI in 64 games.

== Professional career ==
=== Florida Marlins ===
When he was drafted by the Florida Marlins in the second round of the 2005 amateur draft, he did sign. The signing scout was Joel Matthews. Harvey began his minor league career as an outfielder/third baseman, hitting .300 in 65 games with the Jamestown Jammers in 2005. The next year, with the Greensboro Grasshoppers, Harvey hit .245 with 15 home runs and 60 RBI in 96 games. He played for the Jupiter Hammerheads in 2007, hitting .238 with 12 home runs and 55 RBI in 116 games. In 2008, Harvey's average dropped to only .148 while with the Carolina Mudcats. In 74 games with them, he posted an on-base percentage of only .228 and a slugging percentage of .287. 2008 was the year Harvey converted to pitching. He spent eight games as a pitcher (four for the Gulf Coast League Marlins and four for the Greensboro Grasshoppers), going 1-2 with a 6.97 ERA. In 2009, Harvey pitched for the Hammerheads, going 6-7 with a 4.38 ERA in 37 games (three starts). The Marlins added Harvey to the 40 man roster in November 2009 to protect him from the Rule 5 Draft. Harvey was designated for assignment when the Marlins called up Logan Morrison on July 27, 2010. Harvey spent 2010 and 2011 with High-A Jupiter and the Double-A Jacksonville Suns. After the 2011 season, Harvey became a free agent.

=== Pittsburgh Pirates ===
On February 23, 2012, Harvey signed a minor league contract with the Pittsburgh Pirates. He made 31 appearances for the Double-A Altoona Curve, posting an 0-3 record and 3.29 ERA with 45 strikeouts and two saves across 54 2/3 innings pitched. Harvey became a free agent following the season.
