= 2007 ACC tournament =

2007 ACC tournament may refer to:

- 2007 ACC men's basketball tournament
- 2007 ACC women's basketball tournament
- 2007 ACC men's soccer tournament
- 2007 ACC women's soccer tournament
- 2007 Atlantic Coast Conference baseball tournament
- 2007 Atlantic Coast Conference softball tournament
