= 2005 ACC tournament =

2005 ACC tournament may refer to:

- 2005 ACC men's basketball tournament
- 2005 ACC women's basketball tournament
- 2005 ACC men's soccer tournament
- 2005 ACC women's soccer tournament
- 2005 Atlantic Coast Conference baseball tournament
- 2005 Atlantic Coast Conference softball tournament
