= 2007 Atlantic Coast Conference baseball tournament =

American college baseball tournament

- Teams: 8
- Format: 2 division round robin and championship game
- Finals site: Baseball Grounds of Jacksonville; Jacksonville, FL
- Champions: North Carolina Tar Heels (5th title)
- Winning coach: Mike Fox (1st title)
- MVP: Josh Horton (North Carolina Tar Heels)

2007 Atlantic Coast Conference baseball standings
	Conf.				Overall
Team	W		L	PCT	W		L	PCT
Atlantic
No. 10 Florida State ^{x}‍‍‍^{y}	24	–	6	.800	49	–	13	.790
No. 12 Clemson ‍‍‍^{y}	18	–	12	.600	41	–	23	.641
NC State ‍‍‍^{y}	16	–	14	.533	38	–	23	.623
Wake Forest ‍‍‍^{y}	14	–	16	.467	34	–	29	.540
Boston College ‍‍‍	12	–	17	.414	24	–	27	.471
Maryland ‍‍‍	7	–	23	.233	26	–	30	.464
Coastal
No. 2 North Carolina ^{x‡y} ‍‍‍	21	–	9	.700	57	–	16	.781
No. 15 Virginia ‍‍‍^{y}	19	–	9	.679	45	–	16	.738
Miami (FL) ‍‍‍^{y}	17	–	13	.567	37	–	24	.607
Georgia Tech ‍‍‍	15	–	14	.517	32	–	25	.561
Duke ‍‍‍	8	–	22	.267	29	–	25	.537
Virginia Tech ‍‍‍	7	–	23	.233	23	–	31	.426
x – Division champion ‡ – Tournament champion y – Invited to the NCAA tournament As of June 30, 2007; Rankings from Collegiate Baseball

The 2007 Atlantic Coast Conference baseball tournament was held at the Baseball Grounds of Jacksonville in Jacksonville, Florida, from May 23 through 27. North Carolina won the tournament and earned the Atlantic Coast Conference's automatic bid to the 2007 NCAA Division I baseball tournament. This was the first year the conference used the round robin tournament setup. The best record of each group at the end of the round robin would face each other in a one-game match for the championship.

== Seeding Procedure ==
From TheACC.com:

The top two teams from both the Atlantic and Coastal divisions, as determined by conference winning percentage, in addition to the four teams with the next best conference winning percentage, regardless of division, will be selected to participate in the ACC Baseball Championship. The two division champions will automatically be seeded number one and two based on winning percentage in overall conference competition. The remaining teams will be seeded (three through eight) based on winning percentage in overall conference competition without regard to division. All ties will be broken using the tie-breaking provisions.

- Boston College, Duke, Maryland and Virginia Tech did not make the tournament.

== Tournament ==
	Division A	FSU	CU	UM	WF	Overall
1	Florida State		L 1–5	L 3–9	W 11–2	1-2
4	Clemson	W 5–1		W 5–4	L 2–3	2-1
5	Miami (FL)	W 9–3	L 4–5		L 3–7	1-2
8	Wake Forest	L 2–11	W 3–2	W 7–3		2-1*

	Division B	UNC	UVA	NCSU	GT	Overall
2	North Carolina		W 5–0	W 14–5	L 4–8	2-1*
3	Virginia	L 0–5		W 6–1	W 4–1	2-1
6	NC State	L 5–14	L 1–6		W 8–7	1-2
7	Georgia Tech	W 8–4	L 1–4	L 7–8		1-2

Finals
A	Wake Forest	2
B	North Carolina	3

- Florida State and North Carolina were Regular Season Division Champs
- Wake Forest held the tie-breaker over Clemson by defeating them head-to-head 3-2
- North Carolina held the tie-breaker over Virginia by defeating them head-to-head 5-0

== All-Tournament Team ==
Position	Player	School
1B	Dustin Ackley	North Carolina
2B	Tony Thomas Jr.	Florida State
3B	Ramon Corona	NC State
SS	Dustin Hood	Wake Forest
C	Danny Diaz*	Florida State
OF	Tim Fedroff*	North Carolina
OF	Marcus Jones*	NC State
OF	Reid Fronk	North Carolina
DH	Josh Horton	North Carolina
P	David Kopp	Clemson
P	Alex White	North Carolina
MVP	Josh Horton	North Carolina

(*)Denotes Unanimous Selection

== See also ==
- College World Series
- NCAA Division I Baseball Championship
