= North Carolina Tar Heels junior varsity basketball =

North Carolina Tar Heels
- University: University of North Carolina at Chapel Hill
- First season: 1972-73 (as J.V. team)
- History: Final season 2024-25
- Head coach: Marcus Paige
- Location: Chapel Hill, North Carolina
- Arena: Dean E. Smith Center (capacity: 21,750)
- Nickname: Tar Heels
- Colors: Carolina blue and white

Uniforms
Home	Away

The junior varsity men's basketball team at the University of North Carolina was a two-year program that gave non-scholarship students the opportunity to continue their basketball careers at the collegiate level. Tryouts for the JV team occurred every year prior to the beginning of basketball season in October. Players were only allowed to play on the JV team for two years and then they are given a chance to try out for the varsity team as a walk-on. With a valid physical examination, any student that attended the university could try out for the JV team. The JV team was coached by assistant varsity coaches, who were given the opportunity to gain head coaching experience while fulfilling their assistant duties at the varsity level. Hubert Davis, prior to his promotion to head coach for the varsity team, was the head coach of the JV team. After the COVID-19 pandemic shut down sports in spring 2020, the JV team did not compete again until the 2022–23 season. The 2024–25 season was the JV team's final season.

== History of the program ==
The JV team originated as a freshman team when scholarship freshmen were not allowed to play their first year as a student per NCAA rules. Following the 1972 NCAA rule change that made freshmen eligible for varsity action, the University of North Carolina established its junior varsity team in place of the freshman team while most other schools across the nation disbanded their freshman teams.

To comply with the House v. NCAA settlement, which limits NCAA basketball rosters to 15 players, UNC Basketball disbanded the JV team after 53 years.

== Competition ==
In its later years, the JV team played all of its games in the Dean Smith Center three hours before the varsity game tipoff. The schedule consisted of between 14 and 18 regular season games. The JV team played against area Division II and Division III teams as well as junior colleges, prep schools, and community colleges. UNC's men's basketball program was the last in the Atlantic Coast Conference field a JV team. The biggest rivals for the JV team were Hargrave Military Academy and Milligan College. The games were played per NCAA rules, but there was no NCAA Tournament or National Invitational Tournament for the JV team.

== Notable coaches and alumni ==
Roy Williams, the former head coach of the men's varsity basketball team at the University of North Carolina, coached the JV team for eight years while serving as an assistant for Dean Smith. Jerod Haase, former head coach for the Stanford Cardinal men's basketball team, coached the JV team for three years while serving as an assistant to Williams. Phil Ford, the second-leading scorer in North Carolina history, also served as a coach for the JV team. The former head coach of the North Carolina Tar Heels baseball team, Mike Fox, played for the JV team in 1975 and 1976. Former Tar Heel assistant Doug Wojcik also served a stint as the JV coach. Three of the walk-ons for the 2008–09 national championship team, J. B. Tanner, Jack Wooten, and Patrick Moody (younger brother of Christian Moody), were graduates of the JV program.

Hubert Davis coached the JV team for six seasons from 2013-2019 before Roy Williams's retirement resulted in Davis's promotion to varsity coach. Marcus Paige coached the team during its final seasons.
