= Powell–Trollinger Lime Kilns =

- Powell-Trollinger Lime Kilns
- U.S. National Register of Historic Places
- Location within North Carolina Location within the United States
- Location: South of Catawba, near Catawba, North Carolina
- Coordinates: 35°39′11″N 81°3′51″W
- Area: 5 acres (2.0 ha)
- Built: c. 1865
- NRHP reference No.: 74001337
- Added to NRHP: November 8, 1974

Powell–Trollinger Lime Kilns is a set of three historic lime kilns located at Catawba, Catawba County, North Carolina. They were built about 1865, and are built into the side of a hill behind a solid stone wall, 20 to 30 feet high. The kilns were located at the top through rock-lined, circular openings. The kilns operated into the 20th century.

It was listed on the National Register of Historic Places in 1974.
