= Hunter Harvey =

American baseball player (born 1994)

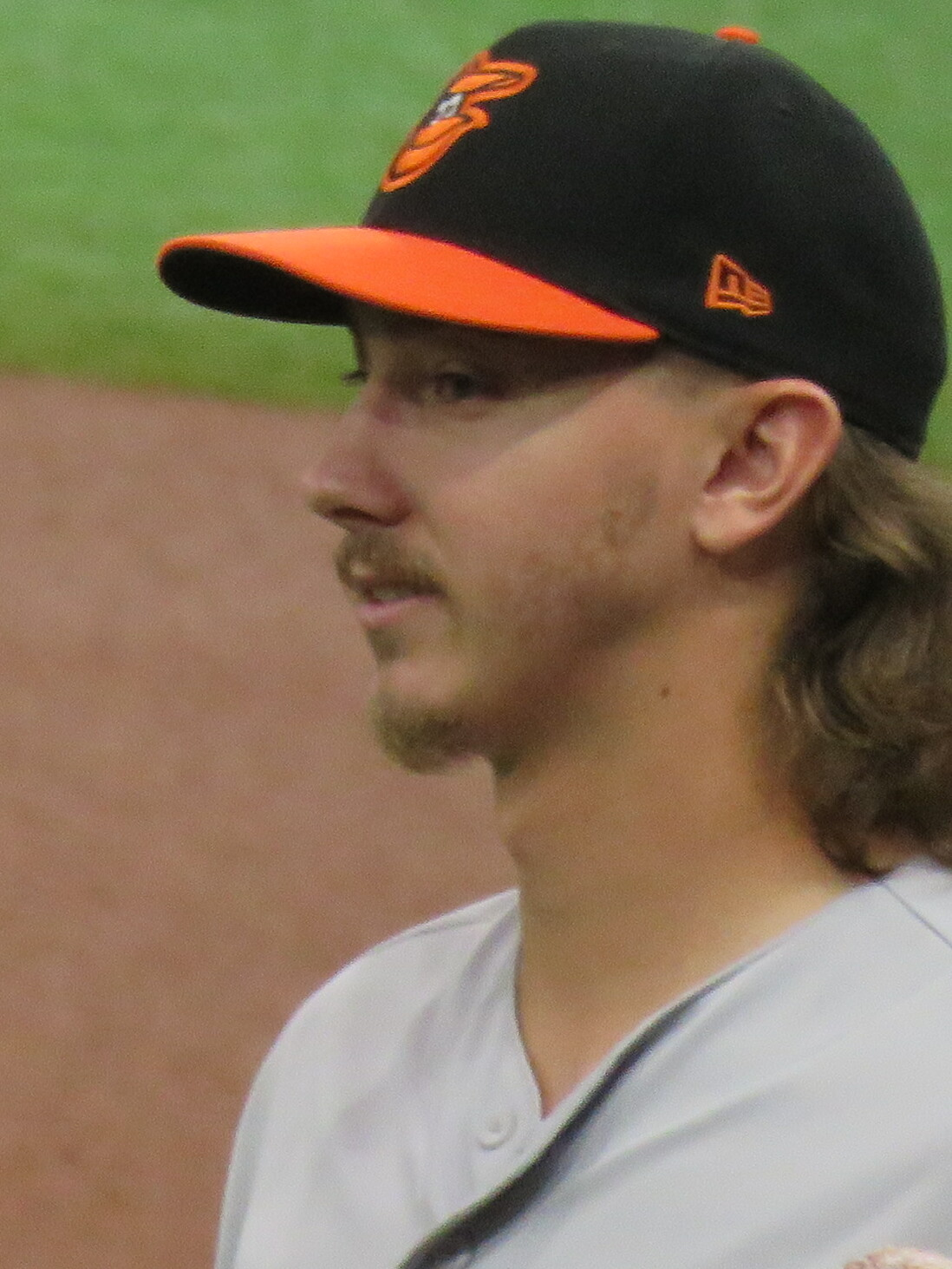
- Harvey with the Baltimore Orioles in 2019

Free agent
- Pitcher
- Born: December 9, 1994 (age 31); Catawba, North Carolina, U.S.
- Bats: Right Throws: Right

MLB debut
- August 17, 2019, for the Baltimore Orioles

MLB statistics (through 2026 season)
- Win–loss record: 10–12
- Earned run average: 3.19
- Strikeouts: 205
- Stats at Baseball Reference

Teams
- Baltimore Orioles (2019–2021); Washington Nationals (2022–2024); Kansas City Royals (2024–2025); Chicago Cubs (2026)

Hunter Luke Harvey (born December 9, 1994) is an American professional baseball pitcher who is a free agent. He has previously played in MLB for the Baltimore Orioles, Washington Nationals, Kansas City Royals, and Chicago Cubs.

The Orioles selected Harvey with the 22nd pick in the first round of the 2013 MLB draft, and he made his MLB debut with the team in 2019. He played for the Orioles through 2021 and played for the Nationals from 2022 to 2024 before being traded to the Royals.

== Career ==
=== Baltimore Orioles ===
Harvey attended Bandys High School in Catawba, North Carolina. The Baltimore Orioles selected him in the first round of the 2013 Major League Baseball draft. He signed with the Orioles on June 20, 2013, and made his professional debut that season for the Gulf Coast Orioles of the Rookie-level Gulf Coast League. In August he was promoted to the Aberdeen IronBirds of the Low-A New York-Penn League. Overall, he started eight games, pitching to a 0–1 win–loss record with a 1.78 earned run average (ERA) with 33 strikeouts in 25 1/3 innings pitched.

Prior to the 2014 season, Harvey was ranked by Baseball Prospectus as the 58th-best prospect in baseball. He spent the season with the Delmarva Shorebirds of the Single-A South Atlantic League where at 19 years of age he pitched to a 7–5 record and 3.18 ERA in 17 starts covering 87.2 innings. His 10.9 strikeouts per 9 innings were tops in the league of all pitchers who had pitched 70 or more innings. He was named an SAL mid-season All Star and an MiLB Organization All Star.

Harvey did not pitch in 2015 or 2016. On May 12, 2015, Harvey was shut down for six weeks due to tightness in his elbow. He did not pitch for a minor league team in 2015. Harvey threw in an instructional league in September 2015. He began the 2016 season on the disabled list, and then underwent Tommy John surgery in July which ended his season. In 2017, Harvey pitched for Aberdeen and Delmarva, along with three rehab games with the Gulf Coast Orioles, pitching to an 0–1 record and 0.96 ERA with 30 strikeouts in 18 2/3 total innings pitched between the three teams (14.5 strikeouts per 9 innings).

The Orioles added Harvey to their 40-man roster after the 2017 season. They assigned him to the Bowie Baysox of the Double-A Eastern League to begin the 2018 season, but promoted him to the major leagues on April 9, to provide a fresh player for the relief corps. However, he did not make his major league debut and was optioned back to Bowie two days later, and spent the remainder of the year there. In nine starts, he compiled a 1–2 record with a 5.57 ERA in 32 1/3 innings.

On August 17, 2019, Harvey was promoted to the major leagues. He made his major league debut that night versus the Boston Red Sox, striking out two batters over one scoreless inning. He was credited with his first major-league win on August 20. In 2019 in the minor leagues he was 3–6 with one save and a 5.00 ERA with 83 strikeouts in 75 2/3 innings. With the Orioles, he was 1–2 with a 1.40 ERA in seven relief appearances covering 6 1/3 innings in which he struck out 11 batters.

In 2020 for the Orioles, Harvey was 0–2 and pitched to a 4.15 ERA with 6 strikeouts in 8.2 innings pitched in 10 games.

On March 16, 2021, Harvey was placed on the 60-day injured list with an oblique strain. He was activated off of the injured list on June 4. Harvey was placed back on the injured list on July 2 with a right lat strain. In Triple-A, with the Norfolk Tides, he was 2–1 with an 8.10 ERA in 10 innings. With the Orioles, he was 0–0 with a 4.15 ERA in nine relief appearances covering 8.2 innings.

=== Washington Nationals ===
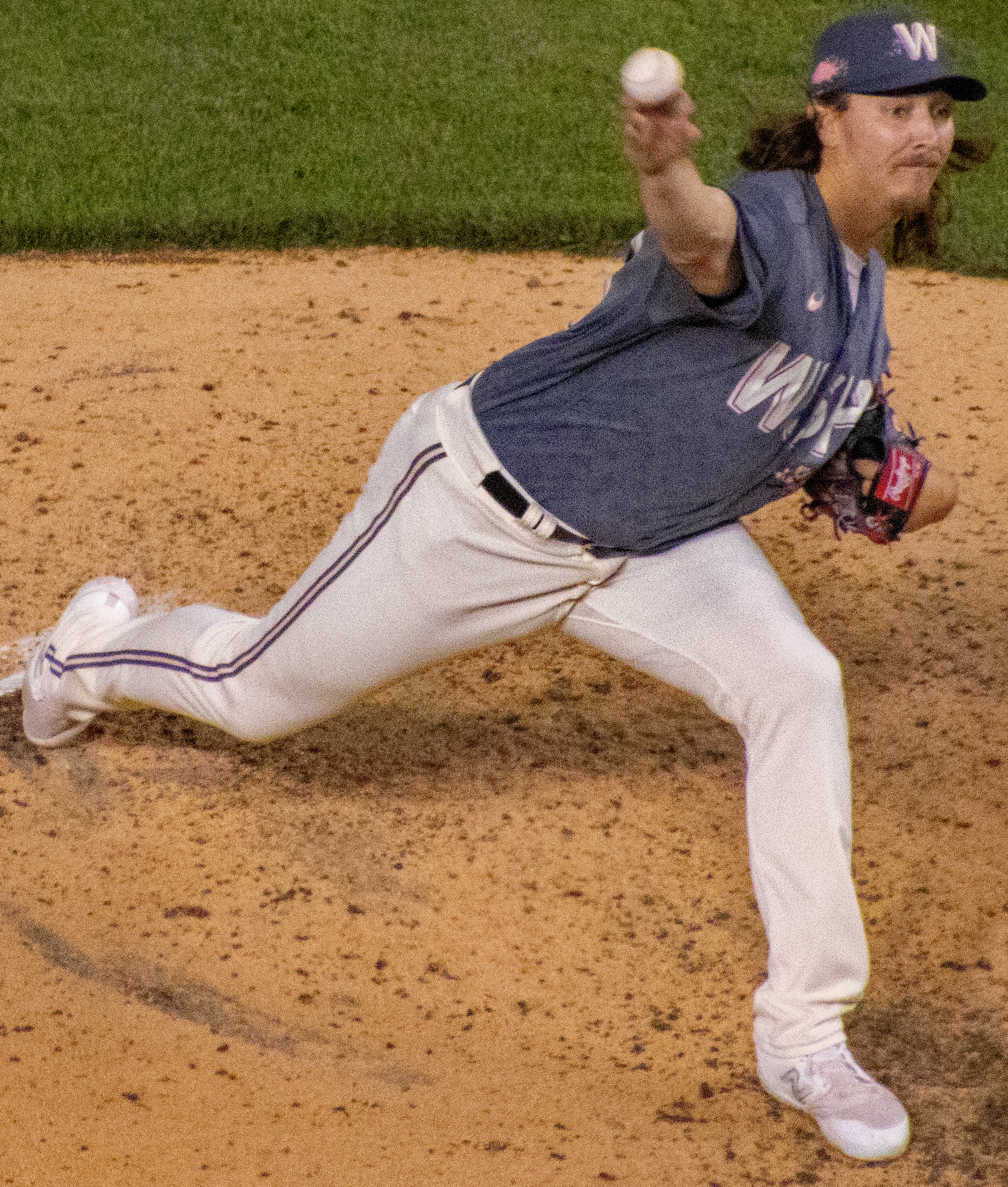
Harvey pitching against the Cleveland Guardians on April 14, 2023

On November 5, 2021, Harvey was claimed off waivers by the San Francisco Giants. He was designated for assignment on March 14, 2022, to create room on the roster for free agent signing Jakob Junis.

On March 21, 2022, Harvey was claimed off of waivers by the Washington Nationals. Harvey was placed on the injured list on April 21 with a right forearm strain, later being transferred to the 60-day IL on June 14. He was activated on July 10.

=== Kansas City Royals ===
On July 13, 2024, Harvey was traded to the Kansas City Royals in exchange for minor league prospect Cayden Wallace and a Competitive Balance Round A pick in the 2024 Major League Baseball draft. He made six appearances for the Royals down the stretch, struggling to a 6.35 ERA with five strikeouts and one save across 5 2/3 innings pitched.

Harvey made six scoreless appearances for Kansas City to begin the 2025 campaign, striking out seven over 5 1/3 innings. On April 11, 2025, Harvey was placed on the injured list with a grade 1 teres major muscle strain; he was transferred to the 60-day injured list on June 5. Harvey was activated from the injured list on July 25. He made 12 scoreless appearances for the Royals during the regular season, striking out 11 and recording one win across 10 2/3 innings pitched. On August 11, Harvey was placed on the injured list due to a Grade 2 right adductor strain.

=== Chicago Cubs ===
On December 31, 2025, Harvey signed a one-year, $6 million contract with the Chicago Cubs. On April 12, 2026, Harvey was placed on the injured list due to right triceps inflammation. He was transferred to the 60-day injured list on May 17. On November 2, the Cubs declined their option on Harvey making him a free agent.

== Personal life ==
Harvey is the son of former Major League Baseball pitcher Bryan Harvey. His brother Kris Harvey played in Minor League Baseball from 2005 to 2012.

Harvey married his wife Summer on December 31, 2021.
