= Bandys High School =

American public school in North Carolina

Location
- 5040 E Bandys Cross Road; Catawba, North Carolina 28609; United States; 35°38′39″N 81°05′07″W

Information
- Type: Public
- Established: 1954 (72 years ago)
- School district: Catawba County Schools
- CEEB code: 340610
- Principal: Leslie McIntosh
- Teaching staff: 40.31 (FTE)
- Grades: 9–12
- Enrollment: 935 (2024-2025)
- Student to teacher ratio: 23.20
- Campus type: Rural
- Colors: Green and old gold
- Athletics: NCHSAA 4A
- Athletics conference: Western Foothills 4A/5A
- Mascot: Trojan
- Yearbook: The Trojan
- Website: bandys.catawbaschools.net

Bandys High School (/ˈbændiz/ BAN-deez) is a public high school located in Catawba, North Carolina, United States. It is part of the Catawba County Schools district.

The school was built for $382,751 and dedicated March 28, 1955.

== Athletics ==
Bandys is a member of the North Carolina High School Athletic Association (NCHSAA) and are classified as a 4A school. The school is a part of the Western Foothills 4A/5A Conference. Bandy's school colors are green and gold, and its team name is the Trojans. Sports at Bandys include:

- Baseball
- Basketball
- Cheerleading
- Cross Country
- Football
- Golf
- Marching Band
- Soccer
- Softball
- Swimming
- Tennis
- Track & Field
- Volleyball
- Wrestling

== Notable alumni ==
- Shane Burton, NFL defensive tackle
- Justin Harper, NFL wide receiver
- Bryan Harvey, MLB pitcher and 2× All-Star selection
- Hunter Harvey, MLB pitcher and son of Bryan Harvey
- Jesse Little, professional stock car racing driver
- Bobby Lutz, college basketball coach
- Adam Scherr, professional wrestler and former strongman, signed to the WWE under ring name Braun Strowman
- Mitchell Setzer, North Carolina state representative
