= Alexander Moore Farm =

Historic farm in North Carolina, United States

- U.S. National Register of Historic Places
- U.S. Historic district
- Location within North Carolina Location within the United States
- Location: SR 2646 0.5 miles (0.80 km) northwest of SR 1004 junction, near Catawba, North Carolina
- Coordinates: 35°42′05″N 81°00′02″W
- Area: 27 acres (11 ha)
- Built: 1843
- Architectural style: Vernacular late Federal
- MPS: Catawba County MPS
- NRHP reference No.: 90000664
- Added to NRHP: April 27, 1990

Alexander Moore Farm is a historic farm and national historic district located near Catawba, Catawba County, North Carolina. The district encompasses 5 contributing buildings and 1 contributing site. The main house was built in 1843, and is a two-story, frame, vernacular late Federal style farmhouse. Also on the property are the contributing log wagon shed, smokehouse, frame barn, and log barn.

It was added to the National Register of Historic Places in 1990.
