= Cayden Wallace =

American baseball player (born 2001)

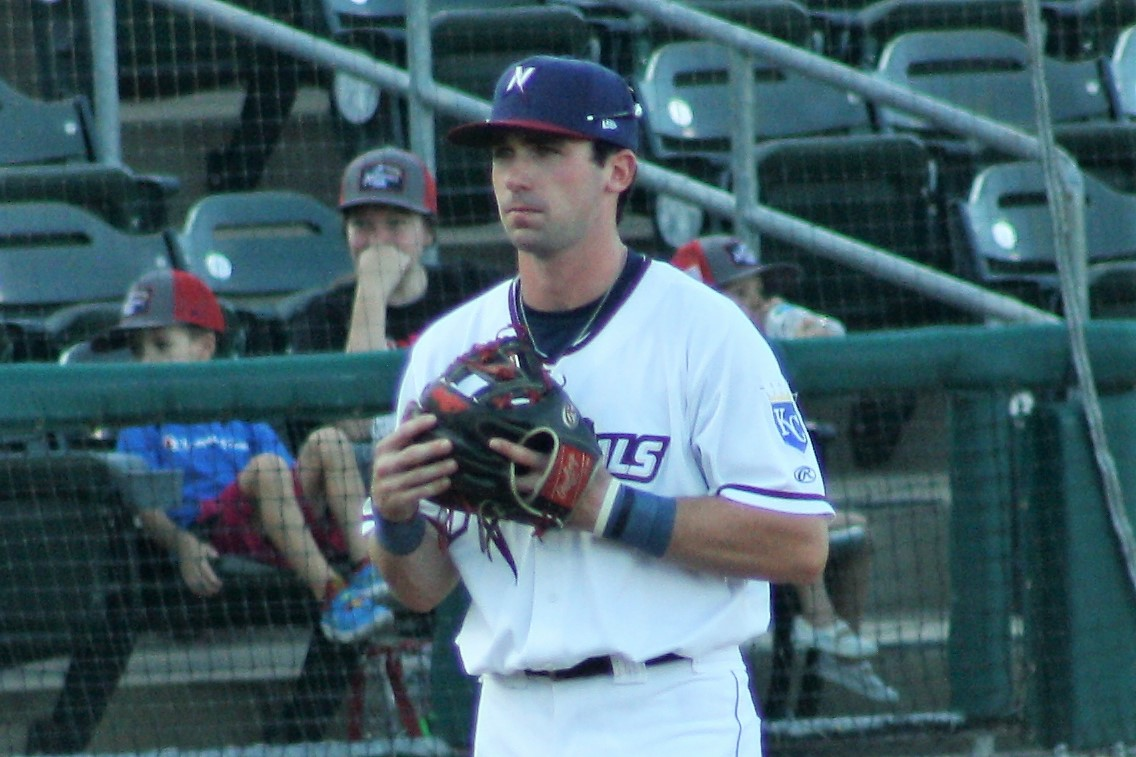
- Wallace with the Northwest Arkansas Naturals in 2023

Washington Nationals
- Third baseman
- Born: August 7, 2001 (age 25); Little Rock, Arkansas, U.S.
- Bats: Right Throws: Right

Cayden Browning Wallace (born August 7, 2001) is an American professional baseball third baseman in the Washington Nationals organization.

== Amateur career ==
Wallace attended Greenbrier High School in Greenbrier, Arkansas. As a freshman in 2017, he hit .349 with four home runs before batting .481 with 11 home runs as a sophomore in 2018. As a junior in 2019, he batted .514 with six home runs and 22 RBI. That summer, he played in the Under Armour All-America Baseball Game at Wrigley Field. His senior season in 2020 was cancelled after eight games due to the COVID-19 pandemic, but he was still named the Gatorade Baseball Player of the Year for the state of Arkansas.

Wallace went unselected in the 2020 Major League Baseball draft and enrolled at the University of Arkansas to play college baseball for the Arkansas Razorbacks. In 2021, as a freshman at Arkansas, Wallace started sixty games (mainly in right field) in which he slashed .279/.369/.500 with 14 home runs, 44 RBI, 11 doubles, and a team-leading 67 hits. His 14 home runs were second on the team behind Robert Moore and also tied the freshman home run record set by Heston Kjerstad. He was named a Freshman All-American, making him the 24th Razorback to earn the honors. After the 2021 season, he played collegiate summer baseball for the Bourne Braves of the Cape Cod Baseball League. For the 2022 season, Wallace moved to third base. He was named the Southeastern Conference (SEC) Player of the Week on March 15 after he hit three home runs (two grand slams) and had 13 RBI over a weekend series. Over 65 games, he batted .297 with 16 home runs, sixty RBI, and 19 doubles, and ended the season as a top-40 prospect for the upcoming draft.

== Professional career ==
=== Kansas City Royals ===
The Kansas City Royals selected Wallace in the second round with the 49th overall selection of the 2022 Major League Baseball draft. He signed with the team for $1.70 million.

Wallace made his professional debut with the Rookie-level Arizona Complex League Royals and was promoted to the Columbia Fireflies of the Single-A Carolina League after three games. Over thirty games, he batted .297 with two home runs, 17 RBI, and eight doubles. Wallace was assigned to the Quad Cities River Bandits of the High-A Midwest League to open the 2023 season. In early August, he was promoted to the Northwest Arkansas Naturals of the Double-A Texas League. Over 130 games between the two teams, Wallace slashed .254/.331/.414 with 13 home runs, 84 RBI, and 18 stolen bases. He was assigned to Northwest Arkansas to open the 2024 season.

=== Washington Nationals ===
On July 13, 2024, Wallace was traded to the Washington Nationals, along with the Royals’ Competitive Balance Round A pick in the 2024 Major League Baseball draft, in exchange for Hunter Harvey. The Nationals assigned him to the Double-A Harrisburg Senators. Over 56 games total for the 2024 season, Wallace hit .256 with three home runs and 23 RBIs. He missed time during the season due to various injuries including a broken rib and oblique strain.

Wallace returned to Harrisburg for the 2025 season. Across 121 games, he batted .242 with ten home runs, 55 RBIs, and 16 stolen bases. Wallace returned to Harrisburg to start the 2026 season, batting .300 with 18 home runs and 45 RBI across 71 games before he was promoted to the Triple-A Rochester Red Wings on July 4. Across 61 games with Rochester, he hit .299 with 11 home runs and 49 RBI. He recorded 279 total bases which were third most in the minor leagues.

== Personal life ==
Wallace's older brother, Paxton, played college baseball at Wichita State University and is currently a free agent. Their father, Mike, played college football at the University of Central Arkansas.
