= Catawba Historic District =

Historic district in North Carolina, United States

- U.S. National Register of Historic Places
- U.S. Historic district
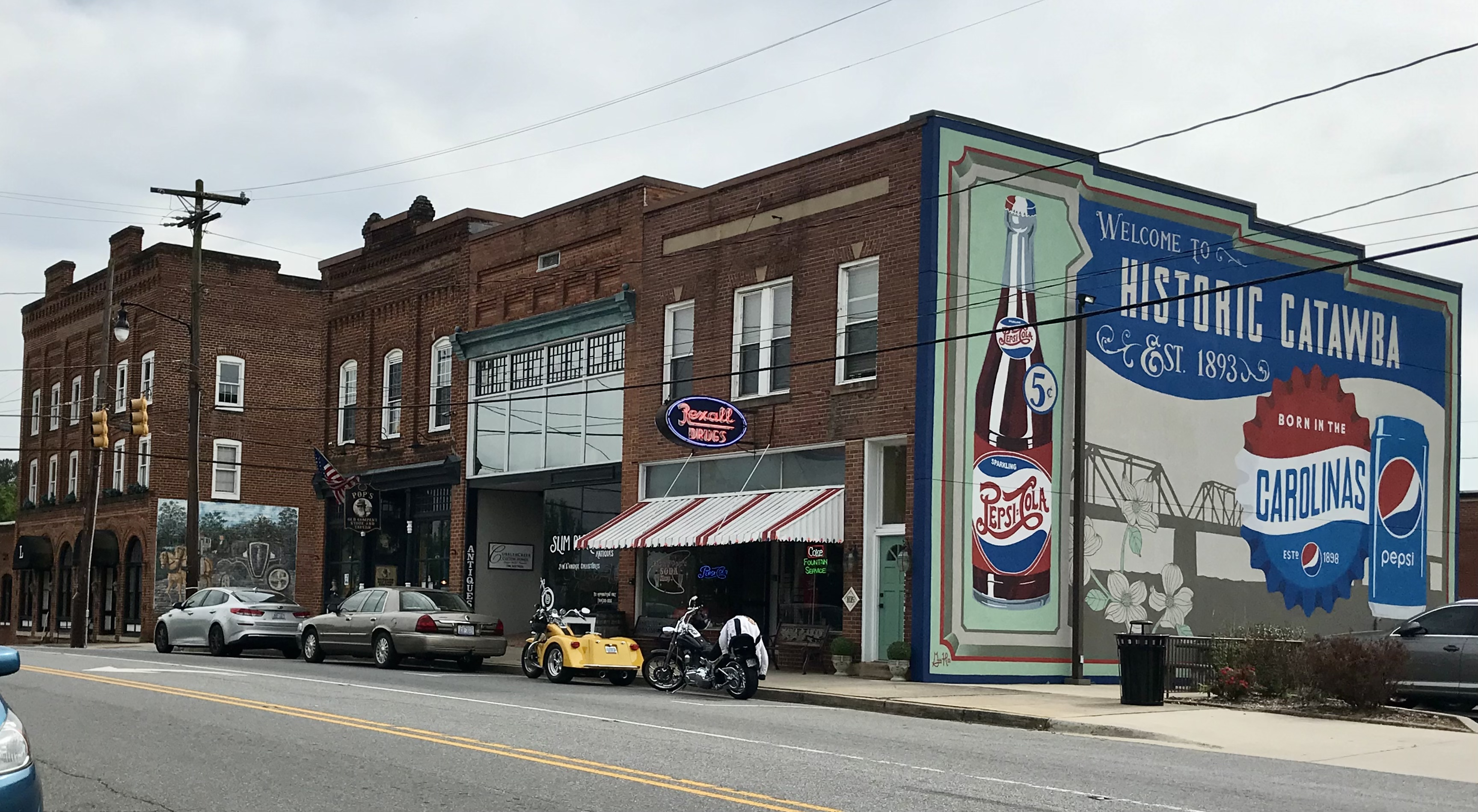
- Buildings in downtown Catawba, including the former Catawba Drug Company building

- Location within North Carolina Location within the United States
- Location: Roughly bounded by Second Ave. NE, Third and Second Sts. SE, Second Ave. SW and NC 10, and Second St. SW, Catawba, North Carolina
- Coordinates: 35°42′26″N 81°04′30″W
- Area: 70 acres (28 ha)
- Built: 1870
- Architectural style: Bungalow/craftsman, Gothic, Vernacular Victorian
- NRHP reference No.: 86000893
- Added to NRHP: April 28, 1986

Catawba Historic District is a national historic district located at Catawba, Catawba County, North Carolina. The district encompasses 48 contributing buildings and 1 contributing structure in the rural village of Catawba. It contains 19th century farmhouses and tracts of farmland with scattered outbuildings as well as village residences and a small commercial district. The district includes notable examples of Gothic Revival, Victorian, and Bungalow / American Craftsman architecture. Notable buildings include the Bagby-Danner Farmhouse, Jacob D. Little House (c. 1884), Town Hall (c. 1920, 1960s), Dr, Fred Y. Long Farm (c. 1909), Catawba ·Baptist Church (1875, 1950s), (former) Catawba High School (1921), Quintus M. Little House (c. 1873), Trollinger-Sherrill House (c. 1873), Brawley-Lowrance House (c. 1897), Pitts-Little House (1924), Manson L. Wilkinson· House (c. 1920), Sherrill Tobacco Company Building (c. 1896), Catawba Drug Company (c. 1915), Pitts-Carpenter Building (c. 1895), Long and Company Store (c. 1895), and the Methodist Church.

It was added to the National Register of Historic Places in 1986.
