= Justin Harper (American football) =

American gridiron football player and coach (born 1985)

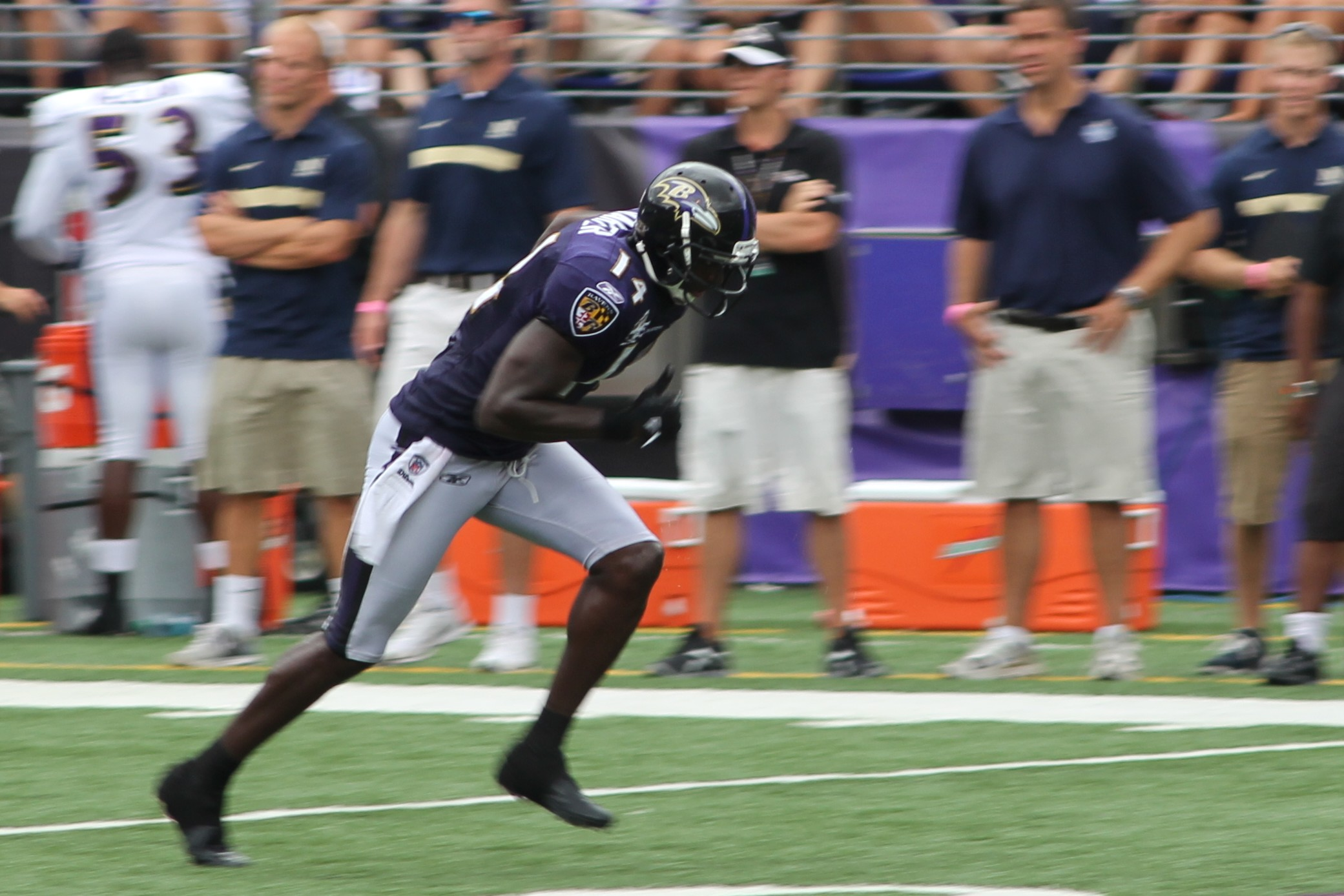
- Harper at M&T Bank Stadium in 2011

Appalachian State Mountaineers
- Title: Wide receivers coach

Personal information
- Born: February 24, 1985 (age 41); Catawba, North Carolina, U.S.
- Listed height: 6 ft 3 in (1.91 m)
- Listed weight: 215 lb (98 kg)

Career information
- Position: Wide receiver (No. 14)
- High school: Bandys (Catawba)
- College: Virginia Tech (2004–2007)
- NFL draft: 2008: 7th round, 215th overall pick

Career history

Playing
- Baltimore Ravens (2008–2010); Saskatchewan Roughriders (2012–2013); BC Lions (2013)*
- * Offseason or practice squad member only

Coaching
- Lenoir–Rhyne (2013–2014) Offensive assistant; Virginia State (2015–2016) Wide receivers coach; Central State (2017) Wide receivers coach; Towson (2018–2021) Wide receivers coach & pass game coordinator; Old Dominion (2022–2023) Tight ends coach; James Madison (2024–2025) Wide receivers coach; Appalachian State (2026-present) Wide receivers coach
- Stats at Pro Football Reference

Justin Harper (born February 24, 1985) is an American college football coach and former professional wide receiver. He is the wide receivers coach for Appalachian State University, a position he has held since 2026. He was selected by the Baltimore Ravens in the seventh round of the 2008 NFL draft. He played college football at Virginia Tech.

== Early life ==
Harper played football at Bandys High School, where he led his team to the state championship game as a senior, playing both wide receiver and defensive back. He was recruited by Winthrop University to play basketball, but decided late in his senior season to try to become a Division I football player. After graduating, he attended Hargrave Military Academy for one year. Harper was then recruited by Virginia Tech.

== College career ==
Harper appeared in 51 games during his four-year career at Virginia Tech, finishing with 83 catches for 1,338 yards, a 16.1 per-catch average, and nine touchdowns. Harper's best game probably came in his final collegiate contest when he caught four passes for 64 yards (including a 20-yard touchdown), and scored on an 84-yard punt return in the 2008 Orange Bowl against the University of Kansas.

As a senior in 2007, Harper played wide receiver alongside Eddie Royal and Josh Morgan and recorded career highs with 41 catches, 635 receiving yards and five touchdown receptions. Together, Harper, Royal and Morgan combined for 120 catches during their final season at Virginia Tech. As a junior in 2006, Harper finished fourth on the team in receptions with 21 catches for 324 yards and one touchdown. During his sophomore season, he posted 16 catches for 295 yards and one touchdown, which came in the Hokies' 35-24 Gator Bowl victory over Louisville. As a freshman in 2004, he caught five passes for 84 yards and a touchdown.

== Professional career ==
=== NFL ===
Harper was selected 215th overall in the seventh round of the 2008 NFL draft by the Baltimore Ravens. He would continue as a member of the Ravens for the next three seasons only receiving limited playing time during the preseason. Justin Harper was released prior to the start of the 2011 NFL season.

=== CFL ===
On March 13, 2012 the Saskatchewan Roughriders of the Canadian Football League announced that they had signed Harper to a contract. On January 24, 2013 Harper was traded to the BC Lions along with Saskatchewan's third round pick in the 2014 CFL draft in exchange for slotback Geroy Simon. On May 24, 2013, a 3 days after the Lions signed Emmanuel Arceneaux, Harper was released.

== Coaching career ==
Since January 24, 2026, Harper has been the wide receiver coach at Appalachian State.

Before Appalachian State, Harper spent time as the wide receivers coach at James Madison University, and prior to that, two years as the tight ends coach at Old Dominion University.

He served as the interim head coach during the 2015-20216 at Virginia State University and was the wide receivers coach at Towson University in Towson, Maryland.
