= 2005 Atlantic Coast Conference baseball tournament =

American college baseball tournament

- 2005-06 ACC baseball tournament logo
- Teams: 12
- Format: Single-elimination play-in game Double-elimination tournament
- Finals site: Baseball Grounds of Jacksonville; Jacksonville, FL
- Champions: Georgia Tech Yellow Jackets (7th title)
- Winning coach: Danny Hall (3rd title)
- MVP: Tyler Greene (Georgia Tech Yellow Jackets)

2005 Atlantic Coast Conference baseball standings
	Conf.				Overall
Team	W		L	PCT	W		L	PCT
No. 10 Georgia Tech ^{†‡y} ‍‍‍	22	–	8	.733	45	–	19	.703
No. 13 Clemson ‍‍‍^{y}	21	–	9	.700	43	–	23	.652
No. 14 Miami (FL) ‍‍‍^{y}	19	–	10	.655	41	–	19	.683
No. 15 Florida State ‍‍‍^{y}	19	–	11	.633	53	–	20	.726
No. 21 North Carolina ‍‍‍^{y}	17	–	10	.630	41	–	19	.683
NC State ‍‍‍^{y}	17	–	13	.567	41	–	19	.683
Virginia ‍‍‍^{y}	14	–	14	.500	41	–	20	.672
Wake Forest ‍‍‍	12	–	18	.400	28	–	30	.483
Virginia Tech ‍‍‍	7	–	19	.269	23	–	28	.451
Maryland ‍‍‍	7	–	23	.233	25	–	31	.446
Duke ‍‍‍	5	–	25	.167	14	–	39	.264
† – Conference champion ‡ – Tournament champion y – Invited to the NCAA tournament As of June 30, 2005; Rankings from Collegiate Baseball

The 2005 Atlantic Coast Conference baseball tournament was held at the Baseball Grounds of Jacksonville in Jacksonville, Florida, from May 25 through 29. Georgia Tech won the tournament and earned the Atlantic Coast Conference's automatic bid to the 2005 NCAA Division I baseball tournament.

== Tournament ==
=== Play-In Bracket ===
- The four teams with the worst records in regular season conference play faced each other in a single elimination situation to earn the 8th spot in the conference tournament.

Play-In Round
8	Wake Forest	10
11	Duke	1
9	Virginia Tech	4
10	Maryland	5

Play-In Finals
8	Wake Forest	20
10	Maryland	13

=== Main Bracket ===
First round
3	Miami (FL)	1
6	NC State	2
2	Clemson	1
7	Virginia	8
3	Miami (FL)	1
2	Clemson	9
4	Florida State	3
5	North Carolina	2
8	Wake Forest	8
1	Georgia Tech	9
5	North Carolina	1
8	Wake Forest	2

Second round
6	NC State	2
7	Virginia	12
2	Clemson	5
6	NC State	4
4	Florida State	4
1	Georgia Tech	5
8	Wake Forest	3
4	Florida State	7

Semifinals
7	Virginia	5	–
2	Clemson	4	–
1	Georgia Tech	18	–
4	Florida State	2	–

Finals
7	Virginia	3
1	Georgia Tech	4

== All-Tournament Team ==
Position	Player	School
1B	Whit Robbins	Georgia Tech
2B	Kyle Werman	Virginia
3B	Ryan Zimmerman	Virginia
SS	Tyler Greene	Georgia Tech
C	Scott Headd	Virginia
OF	Jack Rye	Florida State
OF	Jeff Kindel	Georgia Tech
OF	Tom Hagan	Virginia
DH	Sean Doolittle	Virginia
P	Josh Cribb	Clemson
P	Matt Avery	Virginia
MVP	Tyler Greene	Georgia Tech

(*)Denotes Unanimous Selection

== See also ==
- College World Series
- NCAA Division I Baseball Championship
