= Tyler Lumsden =

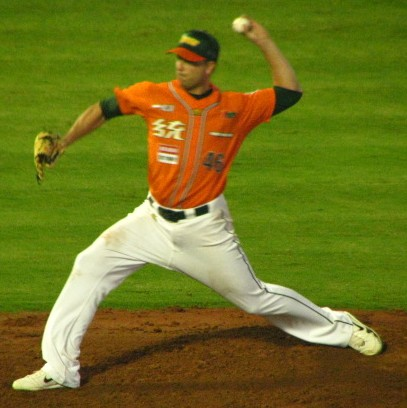
- Pitcher
- Born: May 9, 1983 (age 43); Roanoke, Virginia
- Bats: Left Throws: Left
- Stats at Baseball Reference

Teams
- Chicago White Sox (2004); Kansas City Royals (2006); Houston Astros (2009); San Diego Padres (2010); Brother Elephants (2011); Uni-President 7-Eleven Lions (2013)

Tyler Ryan Lumsden (born May 9, 1983) is an American former Professional Baseball pitcher across four organizations including the Chicago White Sox, Kansas City Royals, Houston Astros, and San Diego Padres. He also attended and played baseball at Clemson University. He was born in Roanoke, Virginia, where he attended Cave Spring High School.

== Career ==
Lumsden was originally drafted out of Cave Spring High School by the Florida Marlins in the 5th round (152nd overall) in the 2001 Major League Baseball draft. Lumsden did not sign with the Marlins, instead opting to play college ball at Clemson University. There he played for three years, mainly as their starting pitcher. Lumsden and his team advanced to the playoffs in each season he was with the team; the highest they reached was during his freshman year in 2002, when they became the top team in the nation during the season while finishing at No. 3 in the nation following the College World Series. After the 2002 season, Lumsden, an honorable mention Freshman All-American, was selected to USA National team trials along with five other freshman that season. Lumsden also played collegiate summer baseball with the Falmouth Commodores of the Cape Cod Baseball League. Lumsden's sophomore season started out dominant while being named a Pre-season All American. One of his most notable starts came against Old Dominion ending in a pitchers duel against Justin Verlander. Both pitchers threw complete games with Lumsden coming out on top 2–0. Lumsden was selected for the second straight week as ACC pitcher-of-the-week while being 3–0 with only 1 earned run and 21 strikeouts in 22 innings. He started the season with 16 straight innings without letting a base runner past second base. Lumsden's best season came in 2003 when he made 16 starts and went 8–2 with a 3.77 ERA. In 2004, the Chicago White Sox selected Lumsden as the 34th overall pick in the draft. He was a 1st round sandwich pick for losing Bartolo Colón to free agency.

Lumsden began his career playing for the Single-A Winston-Salem Warthogs in 2004. Making 3 starts and 12 relief appearances, he went 3–1 with a 4.12 ERA. Following left elbow surgery, Lumsden missed the entire 2005 season.

Lumsden returned in 2006, pitching strong for the Double-A Birmingham Barons. He made 20 starts and was 9–4 with a 2.69 ERA. While with the Barons, he was named to the Southern League midseason All-Star game and Best Left handed pitcher in the Southern League. On July 24, 2006, Lumsden was traded by the White Sox along with Daniel Cortes to the Kansas City Royals for Mike MacDougal. Lumsden was named Kansas City's top prospect and top slider within their organization through Baseball America. Lumsden finished the season with a 2–1 record and a 3.06 ERA for the Double-A Wichita Wranglers. He was also named to the Texas League postseason All-Star game. He was also selected to Kansas City's 40-man major league roster that off season with invitation to Major League Spring Training.

Lumsden suffered a setback in 2007, while battling injuries and pitching for the Triple-A Omaha Royals. In 25 games, 24 of them starts, he had a 9–6 record despite a 5.88 ERA.

On November 20, 2007, the Royals purchased Lumsden's contract, protecting him from the Rule 5 Draft. On November 20, 2008, Lumsden was designated for assignment, and claimed off waivers by the Houston Astros four days later. Lumsden pitched for Houston in 2009 and 2010 before being traded to the San Diego Padres. Following the season, Lumsden became a free agent and elected to play professional baseball overseas.
