= Mike Fox (baseball) =

American college baseball coach

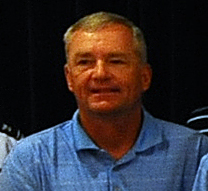
- Fox with North Carolina in 2009

Biographical details
- Born: c. 1956 (age 69–70); Asheville, North Carolina, U.S.

Playing career
- 1976–1978: North Carolina
- Position: Second base

Coaching career (HC unless noted)
- 1979: North Carolina (asst.)
- 1980-1981: Millbrook HS
- 1983–1998: North Carolina Wesleyan
- 1999–2020: North Carolina

Head coaching record
- Overall: 1,487–547–5 (.731)

Accomplishments and honors

Championships
- NCAA Division III College World Series (1989)

Awards
- ABCA Division III National Coach of the Year (1989); Baseball America National Coach of the Year (2008); ACC Coach of the Year (2018)

Mike Fox is an American retired college baseball coach. Fox was the North Carolina head baseball coach for 22 seasons and is considered one of the school's most successful coaches, having led the Tar Heels to seven College World Series appearances, including four consecutive from 2006 to 2009. Over his 37-year head coaching career, he compiled a 1,487–547–5 record (.731 winning percentage). Fox was named to the North Carolina Sports Hall of Fame in 2017.

== Playing career ==
Fox played second base for the Tar Heels from 1976 to 1978. As a senior, he hit .277, tied for the team lead with six home runs. He led the Tar Heels to the 1978 College World Series and was named a member of the CWS All-Tournament Team. Fox also played on the UNC Junior Varsity Basketball team under Eddie Fogler in the 1975 and '76 seasons.

Fox played independent professional baseball for a year after graduating from Carolina before returning to his alma mater as a graduate assistant in 1979.

== Coaching career ==
=== North Carolina Wesleyan ===
Fox coached at North Carolina Wesleyan from 1983 until 1998. Fox led the Battling Bishops to eight trips to the Division III College World Series, and in 1989, his team won the NCAA Division III College World Series.

Fox's career record of 539–141–4 (.791) at N.C. Wesleyan ranked second in career winning percentage (.791) among all active Division III head coaches at the time of his return to Carolina.

=== University of North Carolina ===
Mike Fox was hired as head coach of the North Carolina Tar Heels baseball team on May 7, 1998, becoming the 24th head baseball coach in the history of the school, and only its third coach since 1947. In 2006 and 2007, he led North Carolina to back-to-back 2nd-place finishes at the College World Series. Fox would lead Carolina to another five College World Series appearances in 2008, 2009, 2011, 2013, and 2018. Fox's teams in 2007, 2013 and 2018 won ACC championships. In 2008, he was named the National Coach of the Year by Baseball America, and in 2018, he was named ACC Coach of the Year. On August 7, 2020, Mike Fox retired and Scott Forbes, an assistant on Fox's staff for 19 seasons was named his successor. After 22 seasons, Fox retired as the winningest coach in Carolina Baseball history, with a record of 948–406–1 (.700).

== Personal ==
Fox attended East Mecklenburg High School in Charlotte, North Carolina. He currently lives in Chapel Hill with his wife Cheryl. Mike has a son, Matthew (39), daughter Morgan (35), son-in-law Tyler (36) and four grandchildren.

== Head coaching record ==
Record table
Season	Team	Overall	Conference	Standing	Postseason
North Carolina Tar Heels (Atlantic Coast Conference) (1999–2020)
1999	North Carolina	41–18	13–11	4th	NCAA Regional
2000	North Carolina	46–17	12–12	5th	NCAA Regional
2001	North Carolina	31–26	9–15	T–6th	
2002	North Carolina	43–21	17–7	3rd	NCAA Regional
2003	North Carolina	42–23	13–11	5th	NCAA Super Regional
2004	North Carolina	43–21	14–10	T–4th	NCAA Regional
2005	North Carolina	41–19–1	17–10–1	5th	NCAA Regional
2006	North Carolina	54–15	22–8	T–1st (Coastal)	College World Series Runner-up
2007	North Carolina	57–16	21–9	1st (Coastal)	College World Series Runner-up
2008	North Carolina	54–14	22–7	2nd (Coastal)	College World Series
2009	North Carolina	48–18	19–10	1st (Coastal)	College World Series
2010	North Carolina	38–22	14–16	5th (Coastal)	NCAA Regional
2011	North Carolina	51–16	20–10	3rd (Coastal)	College World Series
2012	North Carolina	46–16	22–8	1st (Coastal)	NCAA Regional
2013	North Carolina	59–12	21–7	1st (Coastal)	College World Series
2014	North Carolina	35–27	15–15	4th (Coastal)	NCAA Regional
2015	North Carolina	34–24	13–16	T-3rd (Coastal)	
2016	North Carolina	34–21	13–17	5th (Coastal)	
2017	North Carolina	49–14	23–7	1st (Coastal)	NCAA Regional
2018	North Carolina	44–20	22–8	1st (Coastal)	College World Series
2019	North Carolina	46–19	17–13	3rd (Coastal)	NCAA Super Regional
2020	North Carolina	12–7	0–3	(Coastal)	Season canceled due to COVID-19
North Carolina:		948-406-1	395–188-1		
Total:		1,487-547-5			
National champion Postseason invitational champion Conference regular season champion Conference regular season and conference tournament champion Division regular season champion Division regular season and conference tournament champion Conference tournament champion

== See also ==
- List of college baseball career coaching wins leaders
