= 2001 Atlantic Coast Conference baseball tournament =

American college baseball tournament

- 2001 ACC Baseball Championship Logo
- Teams: 9
- Format: Single-elimination play-in game Double-elimination tournament
- Finals site: Knights Stadium; Fort Mill, SC
- Champions: Wake Forest (4th title)
- Winning coach: George Greer (3rd title)
- MVP: Dave Bush (Wake Forest)

2001 Atlantic Coast Conference baseball standings
	Conf.				Overall
Team	W		L	PCT	W		L	PCT
No. 9 Florida State ‍†‍‍^{y}	20	–	4	.833	47	–	19	.712
No. 13 Clemson ‍‍‍^{y}	17	–	7	.708	41	–	22	.651
No. 18 Wake Forest ‍‍‡‍^{y}	16	–	8	.667	44	–	18	.710
No. 27 Georgia Tech ‍‍‍^{y}	13	–	11	.542	41	–	20	.672
Duke ‍‍‍	10	–	13	.435	23	–	33	.411
North Carolina ‍‍‍	9	–	15	.375	31	–	26	.544
Virginia ‍‍‍	9	–	15	.375	25	–	31	.446
NC State ‍‍‍	9	–	15	.375	32	–	29	.525
Maryland ‍‍‍	4	–	19	.174	17	–	37	.315
† – Conference champion ‡ – Tournament champion y – Invited to the NCAA tournament As of June 30, 2001; Rankings from Collegiate Baseball

The 2001 Atlantic Coast Conference baseball tournament was held at the Knights Stadium in Fort Mill, South Carolina, from May 15 through 20. Wake Forest won the tournament and earned the Atlantic Coast Conference's automatic bid to the 2001 NCAA Division I baseball tournament.

== Tournament ==
=== Play-in game ===
- The two teams with the worst records in regular season conference play faced each other in a single elimination situation to earn the 8th spot in the conference tournament.

Play-in game
8	NC State	11
9	Maryland	5

=== Main bracket ===
==== Seeding procedure ====
From TheACC.com:

On Saturday (The Semifinals) of the ACC Baseball Tournament, the match-up between the four remaining teams is determined by previous opponents. If teams have played previously in the tournament, every attempt will be made to avoid a repeat match-up between teams, regardless of seed. If it is impossible to avoid a match-up that already occurred, then the determination is based on avoiding the most recent, current tournament match-up, regardless of seed. If no match-ups have occurred, the team left in the winners bracket will play the lowest seeded team from the losers bracket.

==== Bracket ====
1st round
4	Georgia Tech	16
5	Duke	2
8	NC State	5
1	Florida State	11
2	Clemson	3
7	Virginia	7
3	Wake Forest	11
6	North Carolina	8

2nd round
4	Georgia Tech	6
1	Florida State	5
7	Virginia	1
3	Wake Forest	2
Lower round 1
8	NC State	5
5	Duke	3
2	Clemson	7
6	North Carolina	6

3rd round
4	Georgia Tech	3
3	Wake Forest	4
Lower round 2
7	Virginia	2
8	NC State	6
2	Clemson	4
1	Florida State	5

Semifinals
1	Florida State	15
3	Wake Forest	2
4	Georgia Tech	4
8	NC State	6

Championship
8	NC State	8
1	Florida State	4

Championship (if-needed)
3	Wake Forest	17
8	NC State	4

== All-Tournament Team ==
Position	Player	School
1B	Jamie D'Antona	Wake Forest
2B	Jeremy Dutton	NC State
3B	Sean Walsh; Cory Slavik	NC State; Wake Forest
SS	Adam Miller	NC State
C	Tony Richie	Florida State
OF	Joe Gaetti	NC State
OF	John-Ford Griffin	Florida State
OF	Jason Basil	Georgia Tech
DH	Cory Sullivan	Wake Forest
P	Dave Bush	Wake Forest
P	Josh Miller	NC State
MVP	Dave Bush	Wake Forest

(*)Denotes Unanimous Selection

== See also ==
- College World Series
- NCAA Division I Baseball Championship
