= Catawba, North Carolina =

- Town
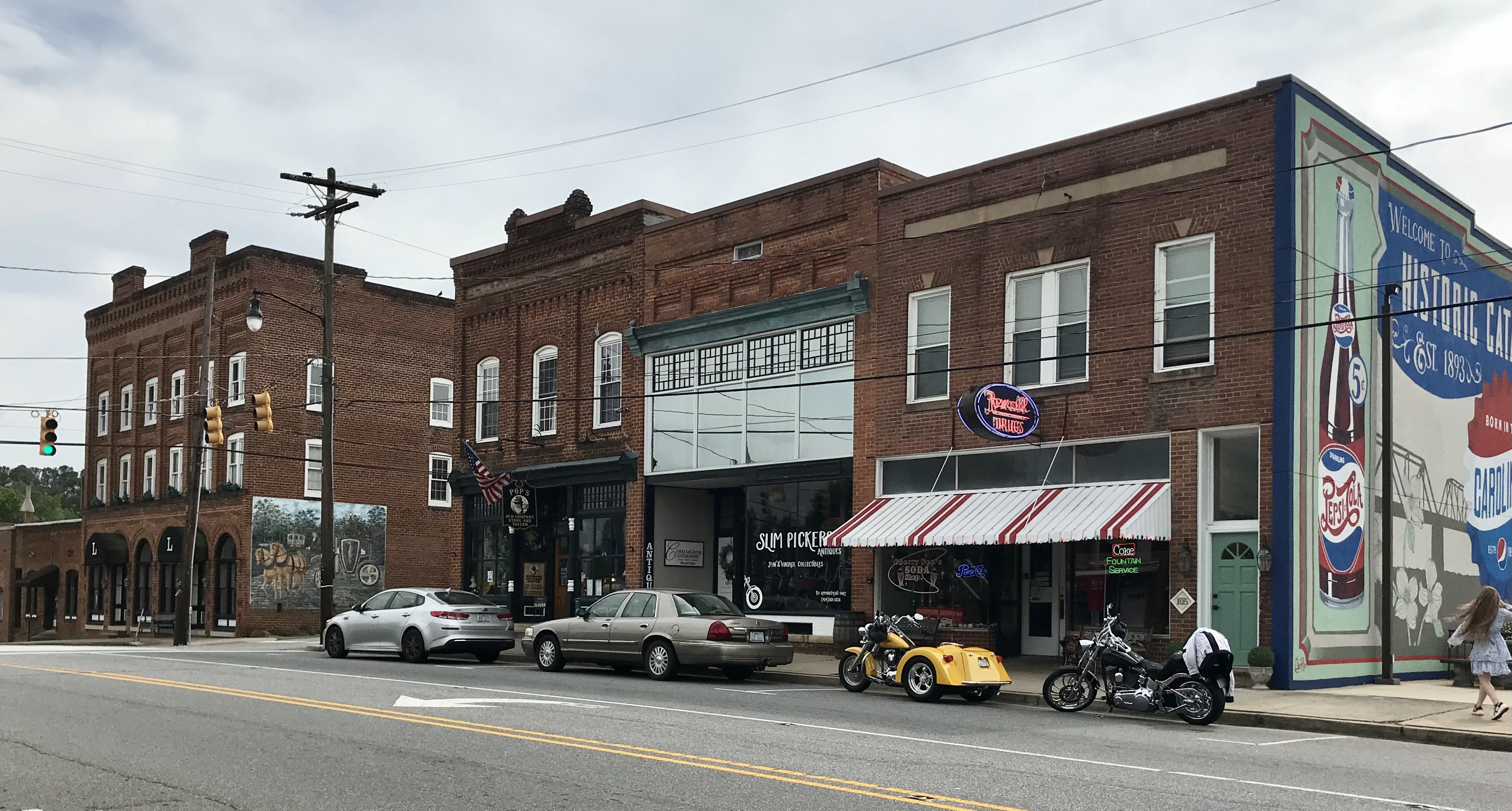
- Buildings on Main Street

- Seal

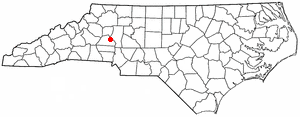
- Location of Catawba, North Carolina
- Coordinates: 35°42′34″N 81°04′03″W
- Country: United States
- State: North Carolina
- County: Catawba

Area
  - Total: 4.62 sq mi (11.97 km^{2})
  - Land: 4.55 sq mi (11.79 km^{2})
  - Water: 0.069 sq mi (0.18 km^{2})
- Elevation: 833 ft (254 m)

Population (2020)
  - Total: 702
  - Density: 154.2/sq mi (59.54/km^{2})
- Time zone: UTC-5 (Eastern (EST))
  - Summer (DST): UTC-4 (EDT)
- ZIP code: 28609
- Area code: 828
- FIPS code: 37-10980
- GNIS feature ID: 2406238
- Website: www.townofcatawbanc.org

Catawba is a town in Catawba County, North Carolina, United States. As of the 2020 census, Catawba had a population of 702. It is part of the Hickory–Lenoir–Morganton Metropolitan Statistical Area. As with the county, the name recalls the Catawba people, the indigenous people who once inhabited the area.

== History ==
The Catawba Historic District, Alexander Moore Farm, Murray's Mill Historic District, and Powell–Trollinger Lime Kilns are listed on the National Register of Historic Places.

== Geography ==
Catawba is located on the northeastern border of Catawba County. Its northeastern boundary is the shore of the Catawba River in Lake Norman.

North Carolina Highway 10 passes through the center of the town, leading north 2.5 miles (4.0 km) to Exit 138 on Interstate 40 and southwest 10 miles (16 km) to Newton. U.S. Route 70 crosses NC 10 north of the center of Catawba and leads east 12 miles (19 km) to Statesville and west 16 miles (26 km) to Hickory.

According to the United States Census Bureau, Catawba has a total area of 4.0 square miles (10.3 km^{2}), of which 3.9 square miles (10.2 km^{2}) is land and 0.08 square miles (0.2 km^{2}), or 1.60%, is water.

== Demographics ==
Historical population
Census	Pop.	Note	%±
1880	142		—
1890	196		38.0%
1900	169		−13.8%
1910	222		31.4%
1920	250		12.6%
1930	340		36.0%
1940	402		18.2%
1950	506		25.9%
1960	504		−0.4%
1970	565		12.1%
1980	509		−9.9%
1990	467		−8.3%
2000	698		49.5%
2010	603		−13.6%
2020	702		16.4%
U.S. Decennial Census

As of the census of 2010, there were 604 people, 270 households, and 208 families residing in the town. The population density was 262.6 inhabitants per square mile (101.4/km^{2}). There were 285 housing units at an average density of 124.7 per square mile (48.1/km^{2}). The racial makeup of the town was 65.90% White, 30.37% African American, 1.00% Asian, 2.15% from other races, and 0.57% from two or more races. Hispanic or Latino of any race were 5.59% of the population.

There were 270 households, out of which 25.9% had children under the age of 18 living with them, 55.6% were married couples living together, 17.0% had a female householder with no husband present, and 22.6% were non-families. 18.5% of all households were made up of individuals, and 8.5% had someone living alone who was 65 years of age or older. The average household size was 2.59 and the average family size was 2.93.

In the town, the population was spread out, with 22.9% under the age of 18, 7.6% from 18 to 24, 29.4% from 25 to 44, 22.6% from 45 to 64, and 17.5% who were 65 years of age or older. The median age was 38 years. For every 100 females, there were 83.7 males. For every 100 females age 18 and over, there were 83.0 males.

The median income for a household in the town was $42,031, and the median income for a family was $42,083. Males had a median income of $33,750 versus $21,645 for females. The per capita income for the town was $20,933. About 8.2% of families and 9.2% of the population were below the poverty line, including 12.6% of those under age 18 and 16.4% of those age 65 or over.

== Education ==
It is in the Catawba County Schools school district.

== Notable people ==
- Shane Burton – former NFL defensive tackle
- Justin Harper – former NFL wide receiver
- Bryan Harvey – former MLB pitcher and 2x All-Star selection
- Hunter Harvey – MLB pitcher and son of Bryan Harvey
- Bobby Isaac – 1970 NASCAR Cup Series champion
- Vernon Lowrance – U.S. Navy vice admiral who was a decorated submarine commander during World War II
- Bobby Lutz – former head basketball coach at UNC-Charlotte
- Jeremy Mayfield – former NASCAR driver
- Mitchell S. Setzer – North Carolina state representative
