= 1990 NCAA Division I baseball season =

Baseball season

- Number of teams: 269

NCAA tournament

College World Series
- Champions: Georgia (1st title)
- Runners-up: Oklahoma State (16th CWS Appearance)
- Winning coach: Steve Webber (1st title)
- MOP: Mike Rebhan (Georgia)

Seasons
- ← 1989 1991 →

The 1990 NCAA Division I baseball season, play of college baseball in the United States organized by the National Collegiate Athletic Association (NCAA) began in the spring of 1990. The season progressed through the regular season and concluded with the 1990 College World Series. The College World Series, held for the 44th time in 1990, consisted of one team from each of eight regional competitions and was held in Omaha, Nebraska, at Johnny Rosenblatt Stadium as a double-elimination tournament. Georgia claimed the championship for the first time.

== Format change ==
The Big East Conference dissolved its divisional format and played as a single eight team division.

== Conference winners ==
This is a partial list of conference champions from the 1990 season. The NCAA sponsored regional competitions to determine the College World Series participants. Each of the eight regionals consisted of six teams competing in double-elimination tournaments, with the winners advancing to Omaha. 25 teams earned automatic bids by winning their conference championship while 23 teams earned at-large selections.

| Conference | Regular season winner | Conference tournament | Tournament venue • city | Tournament winner |
|---|---|---|---|---|
| Atlantic Coast Conference | North Carolina | 1990 Atlantic Coast Conference baseball tournament | Greenville Municipal Stadium • Greenville, SC | North Carolina |
| Big East Conference | Seton Hall | 1990 Big East Conference baseball tournament | Muzzy Field • Bristol, CT | Connecticut |
| Big Eight Conference | Oklahoma State | 1990 Big Eight Conference baseball tournament | All Sports Stadium • Oklahoma City, OK | Oklahoma State |
| Big South Conference | Coastal Carolina | 1990 Big South Conference baseball tournament | Charles Watson Stadium • Conway, SC | Campbell |
| Big Ten Conference | Iowa | 1990 Big Ten Conference baseball tournament | Duane Banks Field • Iowa City, IA | Illinois |
| Big West Conference | Cal State Fullerton | No tournament | | |
| Colonial Athletic Association | East Carolina | 1990 Colonial Athletic Association baseball tournament | Brooks Field • Wilmington, NC | East Carolina |
| EIBL | Penn | No tournament | | |
| Metro Conference | Florida State | 1990 Metro Conference baseball tournament | Pete Taylor Park • Hattiesburg, MS | Florida State |
| Mid-American Conference | Central Michigan | No tournament | | |
| Midwestern Collegiate Conference | North - Notre Dame; South - Evansville | 1990 Midwestern Collegiate Conference baseball tournament | South Bend, IN | Evansville |
| Mid-Continent Conference | Blue - UIC; Gray - Southwest Missouri State | 1990 Mid-Continent Conference baseball tournament | Chicago, IL | UIC |
| Pacific-10 Conference | North - Washington State; South - Stanford | No tournament | | |
| Southeastern Conference | LSU | 1990 Southeastern Conference baseball tournament | Hoover Metropolitan Stadium • Hoover, AL | Mississippi State/LSU (Note: Mississippi State and LSU were declared co-champions after the championship game was suspended due to rain.) |
| Southern Conference | The Citadel | 1990 Southern Conference baseball tournament | College Park • Charleston, SC | The Citadel |
| Southwest Conference | Arkansas | 1990 Southwest Conference baseball tournament | Disch–Falk Field • Austin, TX | Texas |
| Trans America Athletic Conference | East - Georgia Southern; West - Centenary | 1990 Trans America Athletic Conference baseball tournament | Centenary Park • Shreveport, LA | Stetson |

== Conference standings ==
The following is an incomplete list of conference standings:

1990 Atlantic Coast Conference baseball standings
| | Conf. | | | | Overall |
| Team | W | | L | PCT | W | | L | PCT |
|---|---|---|---|---|---|---|---|---|
| No. 21 North Carolina ‍†‍‡‍^{y} | 17 | – | 4 | .810 | 51 | – | 18 | .739 |
| No. 30 Clemson ‍‍‍^{y} | 14 | – | 6 | .700 | 43 | – | 23 | .652 |
| No. 26 NC State ‍‍‍^{y} | 14 | – | 7 | .667 | 48 | – | 20 | .706 |
| Wake Forest ‍‍‍ | 10 | – | 10 | .500 | 35 | – | 24 | .593 |
| Georgia Tech ‍‍‍^{y} | 9 | – | 9 | .500 | 46 | – | 25 | .648 |
| Virginia ‍‍‍ | 7 | – | 11 | .389 | 21 | – | 32 | .396 |
| Duke ‍‍‍ | 4 | – | 15 | .211 | 28 | – | 25 | .528 |
| Maryland ‍‍‍ | 2 | – | 15 | .118 | 22 | – | 26 | .458 |
† – Conference champion ‡ – Tournament champion y – Invited to the NCAA tournament As of June 30, 1990; Rankings from Collegiate Baseball

1990 Big East Conference baseball standings
| | Conf. | | | | | | Overall |
| Team | W | | L | | T | PCT | W | | L | | T | PCT |
|---|---|---|---|---|---|---|---|---|---|---|---|---|
| Seton Hall ‍†‍‍ | 16 | – | 4 | – | 0 | .800 | 35 | – | 18 | – | 0 | .660 |
| St. John's ‍‍‍ | 15 | – | 6 | – | 0 | .714 | 29 | – | 18 | – | 0 | .617 |
| Villanova ‍‍‍ | 13 | – | 8 | – | 0 | .619 | 33 | – | 16 | – | 0 | .673 |
| Connecticut ‍‍‡‍^{y} | 12 | – | 9 | – | 0 | .571 | 27 | – | 19 | – | 1 | .585 |
| Providence ‍‍‍ | 11 | – | 10 | – | 0 | .524 | 27 | – | 21 | – | 0 | .563 |
| Boston College ‍‍‍ | 8 | – | 13 | – | 0 | .381 | 20 | – | 22 | – | 1 | .477 |
| Georgetown ‍‍‍ | 4 | – | 16 | – | 0 | .200 | 17 | – | 30 | – | 0 | .362 |
| Pittsburgh ‍‍‍ | 4 | – | 17 | – | 0 | .190 | 8 | – | 23 | – | 0 | .258 |
† – Conference champion ‡ – Tournament champion y – Invited to the NCAA tournament As of June 30, 1990; Rankings from Collegiate Baseball

1990 Big Eight Conference baseball standings
| | Conf. | | | | Overall |
| Team | W | | L | PCT | W | | L | PCT |
|---|---|---|---|---|---|---|---|---|
| No. 2 Oklahoma State ^{†‡y} ‍‍‍ | 18 | – | 6 | .750 | 56 | – | 17 | .767 |
| Kansas State ‍‍‍ | 13 | – | 11 | .542 | 30 | – | 27 | .526 |
| Nebraska ‍‍‍ | 12 | – | 12 | .500 | 42 | – | 26 | .618 |
| Iowa State ‍‍‍ | 11 | – | 13 | .458 | 33 | – | 27 | .550 |
| Missouri ‍‍‍ | 11 | – | 13 | .458 | 28 | – | 27 | .509 |
| Kansas ‍‍‍ | 10 | – | 14 | .417 | 27 | – | 31 | .466 |
| Oklahoma ‍‍‍ | 9 | – | 15 | .375 | 31 | – | 26 | .544 |
† – Conference champion ‡ – Tournament champion y – Invited to the NCAA tournament As of June 30, 1990; Rankings from Collegiate Baseball

1990 Big South Conference baseball standings
| | Conf. | | | | | | Overall |
| Team | W | | L | | T | PCT | W | | L | | T | PCT |
|---|---|---|---|---|---|---|---|---|---|---|---|---|
| Coastal Carolina ‍†‍‍ | 14 | – | 2 | – | 0 | .875 | 40 | – | 19 | – | 0 | .678 |
| Radford ‍‍‍ | 8 | – | 7 | – | 0 | .533 | 24 | – | 27 | – | 0 | .471 |
| UNC Asheville ‍‍‍ | 8 | – | 9 | – | 0 | .471 | 25 | – | 25 | – | 1 | .500 |
| Baptist ‍‍‍ | 6 | – | 7 | – | 0 | .462 | 12 | – | 36 | – | 0 | .250 |
| Campbell ‍‍‡‍^{y} | 6 | – | 8 | – | 0 | .429 | 15 | – | 33 | – | 0 | .313 |
| Augusta State ‍‍‍ | 5 | – | 8 | – | 0 | .385 | 22 | – | 30 | – | 0 | .423 |
| Winthrop ‍‍‍ | 5 | – | 11 | – | 0 | .313 | 22 | – | 28 | – | 1 | .441 |
† – Conference champion ‡ – Tournament champion y – Invited to the NCAA tournament As of June 30, 1990; Rankings from Collegiate Baseball

1990 Big Ten Conference baseball standings
| | Conf. | | | | Overall |
| Team | W | | L | PCT | W | | L | PCT |
|---|---|---|---|---|---|---|---|---|
| Iowa ‍†‍‍^{y} | 22 | – | 6 | .786 | 38 | – | 19 | .667 |
| No. 23 Illinois ‍‍‡‍^{y} | 19 | – | 9 | .679 | 43 | – | 21 | .672 |
| Minnesota ‍‍‍ | 19 | – | 9 | .679 | 36 | – | 24 | .600 |
| Ohio State ‍‍‍ | 16 | – | 12 | .571 | 31 | – | 29 | .517 |
| Michigan ‍‍‍ | 14 | – | 14 | .500 | 33 | – | 24 | .579 |
| Indiana ‍‍‍ | 14 | – | 14 | .500 | 30 | – | 27 | .526 |
| Michigan State ‍‍‍ | 13 | – | 15 | .464 | 28 | – | 24 | .538 |
| Purdue ‍‍‍ | 8 | – | 19 | .296 | 27 | – | 31 | .466 |
| Wisconsin ‍‍‍ | 8 | – | 20 | .286 | 16 | – | 41 | .281 |
| Northwestern ‍‍‍ | 6 | – | 21 | .222 | 24 | – | 32 | .429 |
x – Division champion ‡ – Tournament champion y – Invited to the NCAA tournament As of June 30, 1990; Rankings from Collegiate Baseball

1990 Big West Conference baseball standings
| | Conf. | | | | Overall |
| Team | W | | L | PCT | W | | L | PCT |
|---|---|---|---|---|---|---|---|---|
| No. 7 Cal State Fullerton ‍†‍‍^{y} | 13 | – | 5 | .722 | 36 | – | 23 | .610 |
| No. 28 Fresno State ‍‍‍^{y} | 13 | – | 8 | .619 | 38 | – | 24 | .613 |
| UC Santa Barbara ‍‍‍^{y} | 13 | – | 8 | .619 | 40 | – | 22 | .645 |
| Long Beach State ‍‍‍ | 12 | – | 9 | .571 | 36 | – | 22 | .621 |
| UNLV ‍‍‍ | 10 | – | 11 | .476 | 29 | – | 24 | .547 |
| UC Irvine ‍‍‍ | 10 | – | 11 | .476 | 34 | – | 25 | .576 |
| San Jose State ‍‍‍ | 9 | – | 12 | .429 | 43 | – | 17 | .717 |
| Pacific ‍‍‍ | 1 | – | 17 | .056 | 14 | – | 40 | .259 |
† – Conference champion y – Invited to the NCAA tournament As of June 30, 1990; Rankings from Collegiate Baseball

1990 Colonial Athletic Association baseball standings
| | Conf. | | | | | | Overall |
| Team | W | | L | | T | PCT | W | | L | | T | PCT |
|---|---|---|---|---|---|---|---|---|---|---|---|---|
| East Carolina ‍†‍‡‍^{y} | 11 | – | 2 | – | 0 | .846 | 47 | – | 9 | – | 0 | .839 |
| Richmond ‍‍‍ | 9 | – | 4 | – | 0 | .692 | 27 | – | 19 | – | 1 | .585 |
| UNC Wilmington ‍‍‍ | 5 | – | 6 | – | 0 | .455 | 23 | – | 25 | – | 0 | .479 |
| George Mason ‍‍‍ | 6 | – | 8 | – | 0 | .429 | 23 | – | 25 | – | 0 | .479 |
| James Madison ‍‍‍ | 3 | – | 5 | – | 0 | .375 | 28 | – | 30 | – | 0 | .483 |
| William & Mary ‍‍‍ | 1 | – | 10 | – | 0 | .091 | 9 | – | 31 | – | 1 | .232 |
† – Conference champion ‡ – Tournament champion y – Invited to the NCAA tournament As of June 30, 1990; Rankings from Collegiate Baseball

1990 Mid-Continent Conference baseball standings
| | Conf. | | | | Overall |
| Team | W | | L | PCT | W | | L | PCT |
|---|---|---|---|---|---|---|---|---|
Blue Division
| UIC ^{x}‍‍‡‍ | 8 | – | 3 | .727 | 33 | – | 24 | .579 |
| Akron ‍‍‍ | 7 | – | 5 | .583 | 25 | – | 29 | .463 |
| Cleveland State ‍‍‍ | 3 | – | 6 | .333 | 13 | – | 27 | .325 |
| Valparaiso ‍‍‍ | 3 | – | 7 | .300 | 20 | – | 35 | .364 |
Gray Division
| Southwest Missouri State ^{x}‍‍‍ | 11 | – | 0 | 1.000 | 42 | – | 15 | .737 |
| Eastern Illinois ‍‍‍ | 4 | – | 7 | .364 | 24 | – | 30 | .444 |
| Western Illinois ‍‍‍ | 4 | – | 8 | .333 | 19 | – | 20 | .487 |
| Northern Iowa ‍‍‍ | 4 | – | 8 | .333 | 20 | – | 39 | .339 |
‡ – Tournament champion As of June 30, 1990; Rankings from Collegiate Baseball

1990 Midwestern Collegiate Conference baseball standings
| | Conf. | | | | | | Overall |
| Team | W | | L | | T | PCT | W | | L | | T | PCT |
|---|---|---|---|---|---|---|---|---|---|---|---|---|
North
| Notre Dame ^{x}‍‍‍ | 27 | – | 5 | – | 0 | .844 | 46 | – | 12 | – | 0 | .793 |
| Detroit ‍‍‍ | 12 | – | 13 | – | 0 | .480 | 24 | – | 25 | – | 0 | .490 |
| Xavier ‍‍‍ | 10 | – | 17 | – | 0 | .370 | 18 | – | 36 | – | 0 | .333 |
| Dayton ‍‍‍ | 9 | – | 20 | – | 0 | .310 | 15 | – | 46 | – | 0 | .246 |
South
| Evansville ^{x}‍‍‡‍ | 15 | – | 3 | – | 0 | .833 | 27 | – | 25 | – | 0 | .519 |
| Butler ‍‍‍ | 10 | – | 15 | – | 0 | .400 | 18 | – | 30 | – | 0 | .375 |
| Saint Louis ‍‍‍ | 1 | – | 11 | – | 0 | .083 | 8 | – | 38 | – | 1 | .181 |
x – Division champion ‡ – Tournament champion y – Invited to the NCAA Tournament; As of June 30, 1990; Rankings from Collegiate Baseball

1990 Pacific-10 Conference baseball standings
| | Conf. | | | | Overall |
| Team | W | | L | PCT | W | | L | PCT |
|---|---|---|---|---|---|---|---|---|
Northern
| No. 18 Washington State ^{x}‍‍‍^{y} | 19 | – | 5 | .792 | 47 | – | 19 | .712 |
| Oregon State ‍‍‍ | 15 | – | 9 | .625 | 30 | – | 22 | .577 |
| Washington ‍‍‍ | 14 | – | 10 | .583 | 30 | – | 19 | .612 |
| Gonzaga ‍‍‍ | 13 | – | 11 | .542 | 37 | – | 21 | .638 |
| Portland ‍‍‍ | 10 | – | 14 | .417 | 26 | – | 25 | .510 |
| Portland State ‍‍‍ | 9 | – | 15 | .375 | 30 | – | 24 | .556 |
| Eastern Washington ‍‍‍ | 4 | – | 20 | .167 | 14 | – | 36 | .280 |
Southern
| No. 3 Stanford ^{x}‍‍‍^{y} | 24 | – | 6 | .800 | 59 | – | 12 | .831 |
| No. 9 Arizona State ‍‍‍^{y} | 21 | – | 9 | .700 | 60 | – | 13 | .822 |
| No. 11 Southern California ‍‍‍^{y} | 18 | – | 12 | .600 | 40 | – | 22 | .645 |
| No. 19 UCLA ‍‍‍^{y} | 14 | – | 16 | .467 | 41 | – | 26 | .612 |
| Arizona ‍‍‍ | 11 | – | 19 | .367 | 26 | – | 34 | .433 |
| California ‍‍‍ | 3 | – | 27 | .100 | 18 | – | 43 | .295 |
x – Division champion y – Invited to the NCAA tournament As of June 30, 1990; Rankings from Collegiate Baseball

1990 Southeastern Conference baseball standings
| | Conf. | | | | Overall |
| Team | W | | L | PCT | W | | L | PCT |
|---|---|---|---|---|---|---|---|---|
| No. 4 LSU ‍†‍‡‍^{y} | 20 | – | 7 | .741 | 54 | – | 19 | .740 |
| No. 1 Georgia ‍‍‍^{y} | 18 | – | 9 | .667 | 52 | – | 19 | .732 |
| No. 5 Mississippi State ‍‍‡‍^{y} | 17 | – | 9 | .654 | 50 | – | 21 | .704 |
| Auburn ‍‍‍ | 13 | – | 13 | .500 | 34 | – | 24 | .586 |
| Vanderbilt ‍‍‍ | 12 | – | 13 | .480 | 28 | – | 30 | .483 |
| Florida ‍‍‍ | 11 | – | 12 | .478 | 29 | – | 30 | .492 |
| Alabama ‍‍‍ | 10 | – | 13 | .435 | 34 | – | 21 | .618 |
| Ole Miss ‍‍‍ | 10 | – | 16 | .385 | 23 | – | 29 | .442 |
| Tennessee ‍‍‍ | 9 | – | 18 | .333 | 28 | – | 31 | .475 |
| Kentucky ‍‍‍ | 8 | – | 18 | .308 | 27 | – | 29 | .482 |
† – Conference champion ‡ – Tournament champion y – Invited to the NCAA tournament As of June 30, 1990; Rankings from Collegiate Baseball

1990 Southern Conference baseball standings
| | Conf. | | | | | | Overall |
| Team | W | | L | | T | PCT | W | | L | | T | PCT |
|---|---|---|---|---|---|---|---|---|---|---|---|---|
| No. 6 The Citadel ‍†‍‡‍^{y} | 13 | – | 1 | – | 0 | .929 | 46 | – | 14 | – | 0 | .767 |
| Western Carolina ‍‍‍ | 10 | – | 7 | – | 0 | .588 | 37 | – | 25 | – | 0 | .597 |
| Marshall ‍‍‍ | 10 | – | 7 | – | 0 | .588 | 20 | – | 19 | – | 0 | .513 |
| VMI ‍‍‍ | 6 | – | 8 | – | 0 | .429 | 12 | – | 26 | – | 0 | .316 |
| Appalachian State ‍‍‍ | 6 | – | 9 | – | 0 | .400 | 19 | – | 22 | – | 1 | .464 |
| Furman ‍‍‍ | 6 | – | 11 | – | 0 | .353 | 20 | – | 24 | – | 0 | .455 |
| East Tennessee State ‍‍‍ | 4 | – | 12 | – | 0 | .250 | 10 | – | 31 | – | 0 | .244 |
† – Conference champion ‡ – SoCon Tournament champion y – Invited to the 1990 NCAA Division I baseball tournament As of June 30, 1990; Rankings from Collegiate Baseball

1990 Southwest Conference baseball standings
| | Conf. | | | | Overall |
| Team | W | | L | PCT | W | | L | PCT |
|---|---|---|---|---|---|---|---|---|
| No. 14 Arkansas ‍†‍‍^{y} | 16 | – | 5 | .762 | 47 | – | 15 | .758 |
| No. 13 Texas ‍‍‡‍^{y} | 15 | – | 5 | .750 | 51 | – | 17 | .750 |
| No. 24 Houston ‍‍‍^{y} | 12 | – | 9 | .571 | 44 | – | 23 | .657 |
| Rice ‍‍‍ | 11 | – | 9 | .550 | 33 | – | 29 | .532 |
| Texas A&M ‍‍‍ | 11 | – | 10 | .524 | 43 | – | 17 | .717 |
| Baylor ‍‍‍ | 9 | – | 12 | .429 | 33 | – | 19 | .635 |
| Texas Tech ‍‍‍ | 5 | – | 16 | .238 | 31 | – | 29 | .517 |
| TCU ‍‍‍ | 4 | – | 17 | .190 | 27 | – | 32 | .458 |
† – Conference champion ‡ – Tournament champion y – Invited to the NCAA tournament As of June 30, 1990; Rankings from Collegiate Baseball

1990 Trans America Athletic Conference baseball standings
| | Conf. | | | | Overall |
| Team | W | | L | PCT | W | | L | PCT |
|---|---|---|---|---|---|---|---|---|
East
| No. 8 Georgia Southern ^{x}‍†‍‍^{y} | 17 | – | 1 | .944 | 50 | – | 19 | .725 |
| Stetson ‍‍‡‍^{y} | 10 | – | 8 | .556 | 33 | – | 31 | .516 |
| Samford ‍‍‍ | 5 | – | 11 | .313 | 25 | – | 28 | .472 |
| Mercer ‍‍‍ | 2 | – | 14 | .125 | 15 | – | 34 | .306 |
West
| Centenary ^{x}‍‍‍ | 12 | – | 3 | .800 | 40 | – | 18 | .690 |
| Arkansas–Little Rock ‍‍‍ | 8 | – | 7 | .533 | 33 | – | 20 | .623 |
| Hardin–Simmons ‍‍‍ | 3 | – | 9 | .250 | 16 | – | 41 | .281 |
x – Division champion † – Conference champion ‡ – Tournament champion y – Invited to the NCAA tournament As of June 30, 1990; Rankings from Collegiate Baseball

== College World Series ==
The 1990 season marked the forty fourth NCAA baseball tournament, which culminated with the eight team College World Series. The College World Series was held in Omaha, Nebraska. The eight teams played a double-elimination format, with Georgia claiming their first championship with a 2–1 win over Oklahoma State in the final.

First round
1 | Stanford | 5^{10}
8 | Georgia Southern | 4
4 | Georgia | 3
5 | Mississippi State | 0
8 | Georgia Southern | 1
5 | Mississippi State | 15
2 | LSU | 8
7 | The Citadel | 2
3 | Oklahoma State | 14
6 | Cal State Fullerton | 4
7 | The Citadel | 8^{12}
6 | Cal State Fullerton | 7

Second round
1 | Stanford | 2
4 | Georgia | 16
1 | Stanford | 6
5 | Mississippi State | 1
2 | LSU | 1
3 | Oklahoma State | 7
2 | LSU | 6
7 | The Citadel | 1

Semifinals
4 | Georgia | 2 | 5
1 | Stanford | 4 | 1
3 | Oklahoma State | 14 | —
2 | LSU | 3 | —

Finals
4 | Georgia | 2
3 | Oklahoma State | 1
