= 1990 College Baseball All-America Team =

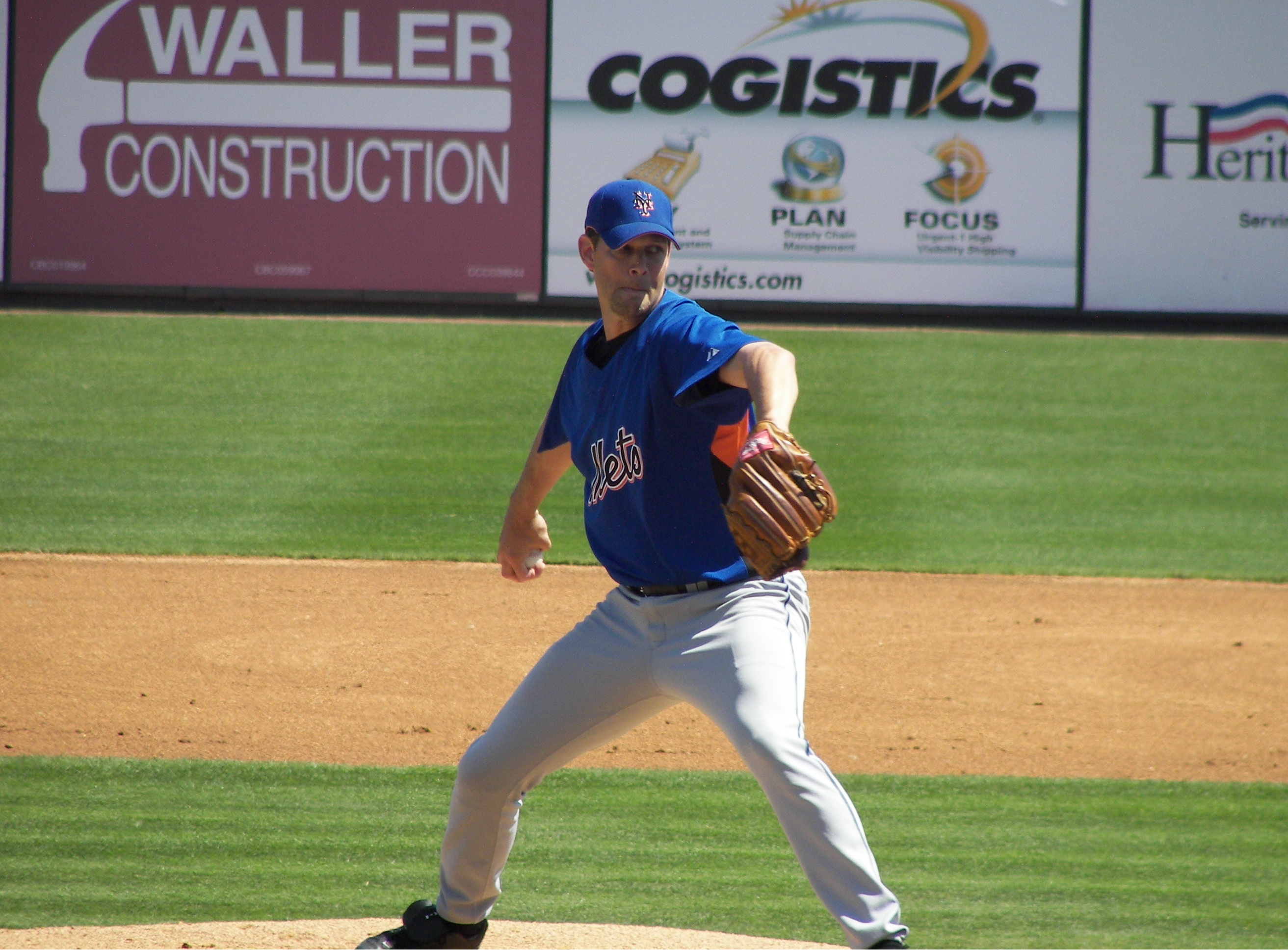
1990 All-Americans included 2× All-Star Aaron Sele.

This is a list of college baseball players named first team All-Americans for the 1990 NCAA Division I baseball season. From 1981 to 1990, there were three generally recognized All-America selectors for baseball: the American Baseball Coaches Association, Baseball America, and The Sporting News. In order to be considered a "consensus" All-American, a player must have been selected by at least two of these.

== Key ==
A	American Baseball Coaches Association
B	Baseball America
S	The Sporting News
	Member of the National College Baseball Hall of Fame
	Consensus All-American – selected by all three organizations
	Consensus All-American – selected by two organizations

== All-Americans ==
Position	Name	School	#	A	B	S	Other awards and honors
Starting pitcher	Kirk Dressendorfer	Texas	1	—	✓	—	
Starting pitcher	Oscar Munoz	Miami (FL)	1	—	✓	—	
Starting pitcher	Sean Rees	Arizona State	2	—	✓	✓	
Starting pitcher	Aaron Sele	Washington State	1	✓	—	—	
Starting pitcher	Dan Smith	Creighton	2	✓	✓	—	
Starting pitcher	Stan Spencer	Stanford	3	✓	✓	✓	
Relief Pitcher	Phil Stidham	Arkansas	1	✓	—	—	
Catcher / DH	Paul Ellis	UCLA	3	✓	✓	✓	ABCA Player of the Year
Catcher	Dan Wilson	Minnesota	1	—	✓	—	
First baseman	Don Barbara	Long Beach State	2	✓	✓	—	
Second baseman	Grant Brittain	Western Carolina	1	✓	—	—	
First baseman	Mike Sciortino	Central Connecticut	1	—	—	✓	
Second baseman	Anthony Manahan	Arizona State	2	—	✓	✓	
Shortstop	Tim Costo	Iowa	3	✓	✓	✓	
Third baseman	Greg D'Alexander	Arkansas	3	✓	✓	✓	
Outfielder	Wes Grisham	LSU	1	—	✓	—	
Outfielder	Jeffrey Hammonds	Stanford	2	—	✓	✓	
Outfielder	Anthony Jenkins	The Citadel	2	✓	—	✓	
Outfielder	Mike Kelly	Arizona State	3	✓	✓	✓	Baseball America Player of the Year Collegiate Baseball Player of the Year The Sporting News Player of the Year Rotary Smith Award
Outfielder	Dennis McNamara	Central Michigan	1	✓	—	—	
Outfielder	Tom Nuneviller	West Chester	1	✓	—	—	
Designated hitter	Andy Hartung	Maine	1	✓	—	—	
Designated hitter	Joe Williams	New Mexico State	1	—	—	✓	
Utility player	Mark D'Alesandro	Illinois	1	✓	—	—	

== See also ==
- List of college baseball awards
