= 1990 Midwestern Collegiate Conference baseball tournament =

- Teams: 7
- Format: Double-elimination
- Finals site: Stanley Coveleski Regional Stadium; South Bend, Indiana
- Champions: Evansville (2nd title)
- Winning coach: Jim Brownlee (2nd title)

1990 Midwestern Collegiate Conference baseball standings
	Conf.						Overall
Team	W		L		T	PCT	W		L		T	PCT
North
Notre Dame ^{x}‍‍‍	27	–	5	–	0	.844	46	–	12	–	0	.793
Detroit ‍‍‍	12	–	13	–	0	.480	24	–	25	–	0	.490
Xavier ‍‍‍	10	–	17	–	0	.370	18	–	36	–	0	.333
Dayton ‍‍‍	9	–	20	–	0	.310	15	–	46	–	0	.246
South
Evansville ^{x}‍‍‡‍	15	–	3	–	0	.833	27	–	25	–	0	.519
Butler ‍‍‍	10	–	15	–	0	.400	18	–	30	–	0	.375
Saint Louis ‍‍‍	1	–	11	–	0	.083	8	–	38	–	1	.181
x – Division champion ‡ – Tournament champion y – Invited to the NCAA Tournament; As of June 30, 1990; Rankings from Collegiate Baseball

The 1990 Midwestern Collegiate Conference baseball tournament took place in May 1990, near the close of the 1990 NCAA Division I baseball season. All seven of the league's teams met in the double-elimination tournament held at Stanley Coveleski Regional Stadium home stadium of Notre Dame in South Bend, Indiana. South Division champion and second seeded Evansville won their second league championship. They Purple Aces fell in the play-in round leading up to the 1990 NCAA Division I baseball tournament.

== Seeding and format ==
The league's teams are seeded one through seven based on winning percentage, using conference games only. The top seed received a single bye, with remaining teams facing off in the opening round.

Team	W	L	PCT	GB	Seed
North
Notre Dame	27	5	.844	—	1
Detroit	12	13	.480	11.5	3
Xavier	10	17	.370	14.5	5
Dayton	9	20	.310	16.5	6

Team	W	L	Pct.	GB	Seed
South
Evansville	15	3	.833	—	2
Butler	10	15	.400	8.5	4
Saint Louis	1	11	.083	11	7

== Bracket and results ==
Upper round 1	Upper round 2	Upper final	Final
1	Notre Dame	6
4	Butler	0
4	Butler	5
5	Xavier	1
1	Notre Dame	3
2	Evansville	7
3	Detroit	8
6	Dayton	4
3	Detroit	4
2	Evansville	6
2	Evansville	11
7	Saint Louis	3
2	Evansville	8
1	Notre Dame	7
Lower round 1	Lower round 2	Lower round 3	Lower final
4	Butler	7
6	Dayton	10 ^{(15)}	6	Dayton	8	2	Notre Dame	16
7	Saint Louis	6	6	Dayton	14	6	Dayton	3
5	Xavier	12
3	Detroit	5
5	Xavier	8
