= 1990 Georgia Bulldogs baseball team =

American college baseball season

1990 Georgia Bulldogs baseball

National champions
- Conference: Southeastern Conference
- CB: No. 1
- Record: 52–19 (18–9 SEC)
- Head coach: Steve Webber (10th year)
- Home stadium: Foley Field

1990 Southeastern Conference baseball standings
	Conf.				Overall
Team	W		L	PCT	W		L	PCT
No. 4 LSU ‍†‍‡‍^{y}	20	–	7	.741	54	–	19	.740
No. 1 Georgia ‍‍‍^{y}	18	–	9	.667	52	–	19	.732
No. 5 Mississippi State ‍‍‡‍^{y}	17	–	9	.654	50	–	21	.704
Auburn ‍‍‍	13	–	13	.500	34	–	24	.586
Vanderbilt ‍‍‍	12	–	13	.480	28	–	30	.483
Florida ‍‍‍	11	–	12	.478	29	–	30	.492
Alabama ‍‍‍	10	–	13	.435	34	–	21	.618
Ole Miss ‍‍‍	10	–	16	.385	23	–	29	.442
Tennessee ‍‍‍	9	–	18	.333	28	–	31	.475
Kentucky ‍‍‍	8	–	18	.308	27	–	29	.482
† – Conference champion ‡ – Tournament champion y – Invited to the NCAA tournament As of June 30, 1990; Rankings from Collegiate Baseball

The 1990 Georgia Bulldogs baseball team represented the University of Georgia in the 1990 NCAA Division I baseball season. The Bulldogs played their home games at Foley Field. The team was coached by Steve Webber in his 10th season at Georgia.

The Bulldogs won the College World Series, defeating the Oklahoma State Cowboys in the championship game.

== Roster ==
1990 Georgia Bulldogs roster
Pitchers: Steve DeBlasi; Dave Fleming; Mickey Haynes; Matt Hoitsma; Joe Kelly; Stan Payne; Mike Rebhan; Kendall Rhine; Tracy Wildes; Tom Zdanowicz	Infielders: Joey Alfonso; Bruce Chick; Jeff Cooper; Josh Schneider; David Perno; Doug Radziewicz; J. R. Showalter	Outfielders: Brian Jester; Ray Kirschner; McKay Smith; Ray Suplee; Catchers: Terry Childers; Tommy Owen; J. P. Stewart

== Schedule ==
1990 Georgia Bulldogs baseball game log
Regular season
Regular season

Opponent	Score	Overall record	SEC Record
at Jacksonville	10-2	1–0	–
at Jacksonville	5-6	1–1	–
at Georgia Southern	9-2	2–1	–
at Georgia Southern	4-8	2–2	–
Jacksonville	1-3	2–3	–
Jacksonville	6-0	3–3	–
Georgia Southern	3-1	4–3	–
Georgia Southern	10-2	5–3	–
Wake Forest	14-4	6–3	–
Wake Forest	8-13	6–4	–
Wake Forest	13-2	7–4	–
Western Carolina	14-6	8–4	–
at Central Florida	5-1	9–4	–
at Central Florida	7-2	10–4	–
Campbell	6-4	11–4	–
Campbell	10-2	12–4	–
Old Dominion	13-6	13–4	–
Old Dominion	16-9	14–4	–
Virginia	13-1	15–4	–
Virginia	8-2	16–4	–
Virginia	12-3	17–4	–
Virginia	11-6	18–4	–
at Kentucky	4-2	19–4	1-0
at Kentucky	3-2	20–4	2-0
at Kentucky	2-7	20–5	2-1
Auburn	14-2	21–5	3-1
Auburn	7-0	22–5	4-1
Auburn	11-10	23–5	5-1
Georgia College	8-5	24–5	–
Clemson	9-8	25–5	–
at Vanderbilt	1-5	25–6	5-2
at Vanderbilt	2-7	25–7	5-3
at Vanderbilt	12-11	26–7	6-3
at Augusta College	20-2	27–7	–
Tennessee	8-5	28–7	7-3
Tennessee	13-4	29–7	8-3
Tennessee	3-2	30–7	9-3
Georgia Tech	9-8	31–7	–
at Alabama	9-2	32–7	10-3
at Alabama	4-3	33–7	11-3
at Alabama	11-9	34–7	12-3
Western Carolina	12-11	35–7	–
Western Carolina	15-3	36–7	–
Florida	6-4	37–7	13-3
Florida	4-3	38–7	14-3
Florida	1-4	38–8	14-4
Augusta College	15-2	39–8	–
at Georgia Tech	2-8	39–9	–
at Mississippi State	9-0	40–9	15-4
at Mississippi State	12-1	41–9	16-4
at Mississippi State	6-22	41–10	16-5
Georgia Tech	8-6	42–10	–
at Georgia Tech	5-12	42–11	–
Mississippi	6-1	43–11	17-5
Mississippi	2-7	43–12	17-6
Mississippi	15-4	44–12	18-6
at LSU	2-11	44–13	18-7
at LSU	2-5	44–14	18-8
at LSU	5-8	44–15	18-9

Postseason
SEC Tournament

Date	Opponent	Site/stadium	Score	Overall record
May 17	vs. Vanderbilt	Hoover Metropolitan Stadium	3-6	44-16
May 18	vs. Florida	Hoover Metropolitan Stadium	5-6	44-17

NCAA tournament: Northeast Regional

Date	Opponent	Site/stadium	Score	Overall record
May 25	vs. Connecticut	Municipal Stadium	7-2	45–17
May 26	vs. Maine	Municipal Stadium	6-3	46–17
May 27	vs. North Carolina	Municipal Stadium	5-4	47–17
May 28	vs. Rutgers	Municipal Stadium	3-4	47–18
May 28	vs. Rutgers	Municipal Stadium	20-9	48–18

NCAA tournament: College World Series

Date	Opponent	Site/stadium	Score	Overall record
June 1	vs. Mississippi State	Rosenblatt Stadium	3–0	49–18
June 3	vs. Stanford	Rosenblatt Stadium	16–2	50–18
June 6	vs. Stanford	Rosenblatt Stadium	2–4	50–19
June 8	vs. Stanford	Rosenblatt Stadium	5–1	51–19
June 9	vs. Oklahoma State	Rosenblatt Stadium	2–1	52–19

== Awards and honors ==
Dave Fleming

- All-America Third Team
- College World Series All-Tournament Team

Brian Jester

- All-America Second First Team

Stan Payne

- Freshman All-American

Doug Radziewicz

- College World Series All-Tournament Team

Mike Rebhan

- College World Series Most Outstanding Player

J.R. Showalter

- All-America Second First Team

Ray Suplee

- Freshman All-American

== Bulldogs in the 1990 MLB draft ==
The following members of the Georgia Bulldogs baseball program were drafted in the 1990 Major League Baseball draft.

Player	Position	Round	Overall	MLB team
Dave Fleming	LHP	3rd	79th	Seattle Mariners
J.R. Showalter	SS	10th	287th	California Angels
Bruce Chick	OF	15th	416th	Boston Red Sox
Tommy Owen	C	55th	1343rd	Atlanta Braves
