= 1990 Big South Conference baseball tournament =

- Teams: 7
- Format: Double-elimination
- Finals site: Charles Watson Stadium; Conway, South Carolina
- Champions: Campbell (2nd title)
- Winning coach: Mike Caldwell (2nd title)
- MVP: Chris Wagner (Campbell)

1990 Big South Conference baseball standings
	Conf.						Overall
Team	W		L		T	PCT	W		L		T	PCT
Coastal Carolina ‍†‍‍	14	–	2	–	0	.875	40	–	19	–	0	.678
Radford ‍‍‍	8	–	7	–	0	.533	24	–	27	–	0	.471
UNC Asheville ‍‍‍	8	–	9	–	0	.471	25	–	25	–	1	.500
Baptist ‍‍‍	6	–	7	–	0	.462	12	–	36	–	0	.250
Campbell ‍‍‡‍^{y}	6	–	8	–	0	.429	15	–	33	–	0	.313
Augusta State ‍‍‍	5	–	8	–	0	.385	22	–	30	–	0	.423
Winthrop ‍‍‍	5	–	11	–	0	.313	22	–	28	–	1	.441
† – Conference champion ‡ – Tournament champion y – Invited to the NCAA tournament As of June 30, 1990; Rankings from Collegiate Baseball

The 1990 Big South Conference baseball tournament was the postseason baseball tournament for the Big South Conference, held from May 12 through 15 at Charles Watson Stadium home field of Coastal Carolina in Conway, South Carolina. All seven teams participated in the double-elimination tournament. For the first time, the Tournament champion received an automatic bid to the 1990 NCAA Division I baseball tournament. Campbell won the championship for the second time.

== Format ==
All seven teams qualified for the tournament, with the regular season champion receiving a single bye. The final was winner take all, regardless of the number of losses.

Team	W	L	Pct.	GB	Seed
Coastal Carolina	14	2	.875	—	1
Radford	8	7	.533	5.5	2
UNC Asheville	8	9	.471	6.5	3
Baptist	6	7	.462	6.5	4
Campbell	6	8	.429	7	5
Augusta State	5	8	.385	7.5	6
Winthrop	5	11	.313	9	7

== Bracket and results ==
Round of 16
4	Baptist	4
5	Campbell	12
2	Radford	2
7	Winthrop	1
4	Baptist	1
7	Winthrop	3

Quarterfinals
3	UNC Asheville	1
6	Augusta State	7
3	UNC Asheville	2
1	Coastal Carolina	6
5	Campbell	7
2	Radford	3
2	Radford	4
7	Winthrop	8

Semifinals
6	Augusta State	3	1
1	Coastal Carolina	4	4
5	Campbell	2	—
7	Winthrop	1	—

Finals
1	Coastal Carolina	2
5	Campbell	5

=== Game results ===
Date	Game	Winner	Score	Loser	Note
May 12	1	(5) Campbell	12 – 4	(4) Baptist	
May 12	2	(2) Radford	2 – 1	(7) Winthrop	
May 12	3	(7) Winthrop	3 – 1	(4) Baptist	Baptist eliminated
May 12	4	(5) Campbell	7 – 3	(2) Radford	
May 13	5	(6) Augusta State	7 – 1	(3) UNC Asheville	
May 13	6	(1) Coastal Carolina	6 – 2	(3) UNC Asheville	UNC Asheville eliminated
May 14	7	(7) Winthrop	8 – 4	(2) Radford	Radford eliminated
May 14	8	(5) Campbell	2 – 1	(7) Winthrop	Winthrop eliminated
May 14	9	(1) Coastal Carolina	4 – 3	(6) Augusta State	
May 14	10	(1) Coastal Carolina	4 – 1	(6) Augusta State	Augusta State eliminated
May 15	11	(5) Campbell	5 – 2	(1) Coastal Carolina	Campbell wins Big South Tournament

== All-Tournament Team ==
Name	School
Ricky Berrier	Campbell
Ben Chow	Radford
J.C. Hendrix	Campbell
Chris Hodge	Augusta State
Randy Hood	Campbell
Carey Killian	Winthrop
Phil Leftwich	Radford
Mark Romer	Coastal Carolina
Mark Slobodnik	Coastal Carolina
Tony Spires	Coastal Carolina
Ed Stanley	Campbell
Chris Wagner	Campbell

=== Most Valuable Player ===
Chris Wagner was named Tournament Most Valuable Player. Wagner was a pitcher for Campbell.
