= Chal Port =

American baseball coach (1931–2011)

Biographical details
- Born: August 9, 1931; Mifflintown, Pennsylvania, U.S.
- Died: August 20, 2011 (aged 80); Charleston, South Carolina, U.S.

Playing career
- 1954: Eau Claire Braves
- 1956: North Carolina (baseball and football)
- Position: Pitcher

Coaching career (HC unless noted)
- 1965–91: The Citadel

Head coaching record
- Overall: 641–386–2

Accomplishments and honors

Championships
- 1990 Atlantic Regional; SoCon Regular season: 1971, 1975, 1979, 1982, 1983, 1990, 1991; SoCon tournament: 1990

Awards
- 1990 The Sporting News National Coach of the Year; South Carolina Athletic Hall of Fame; Southern Conference Coach of the Year

Chalmers Port (August 9, 1931 – August 20, 2011) was an American college baseball coach at The Citadel, The Military College of South Carolina. Most famous for leading Bulldogs to the 1990 College World Series, Port coached for 27 seasons garnering a 641–386–2 record. His win total was only surpassed in 2010 by successor Fred Jordan, who played for Port.

== Playing career ==
Port played football and baseball at the University of North Carolina prior to a brief minor league career.

== Coaching career ==
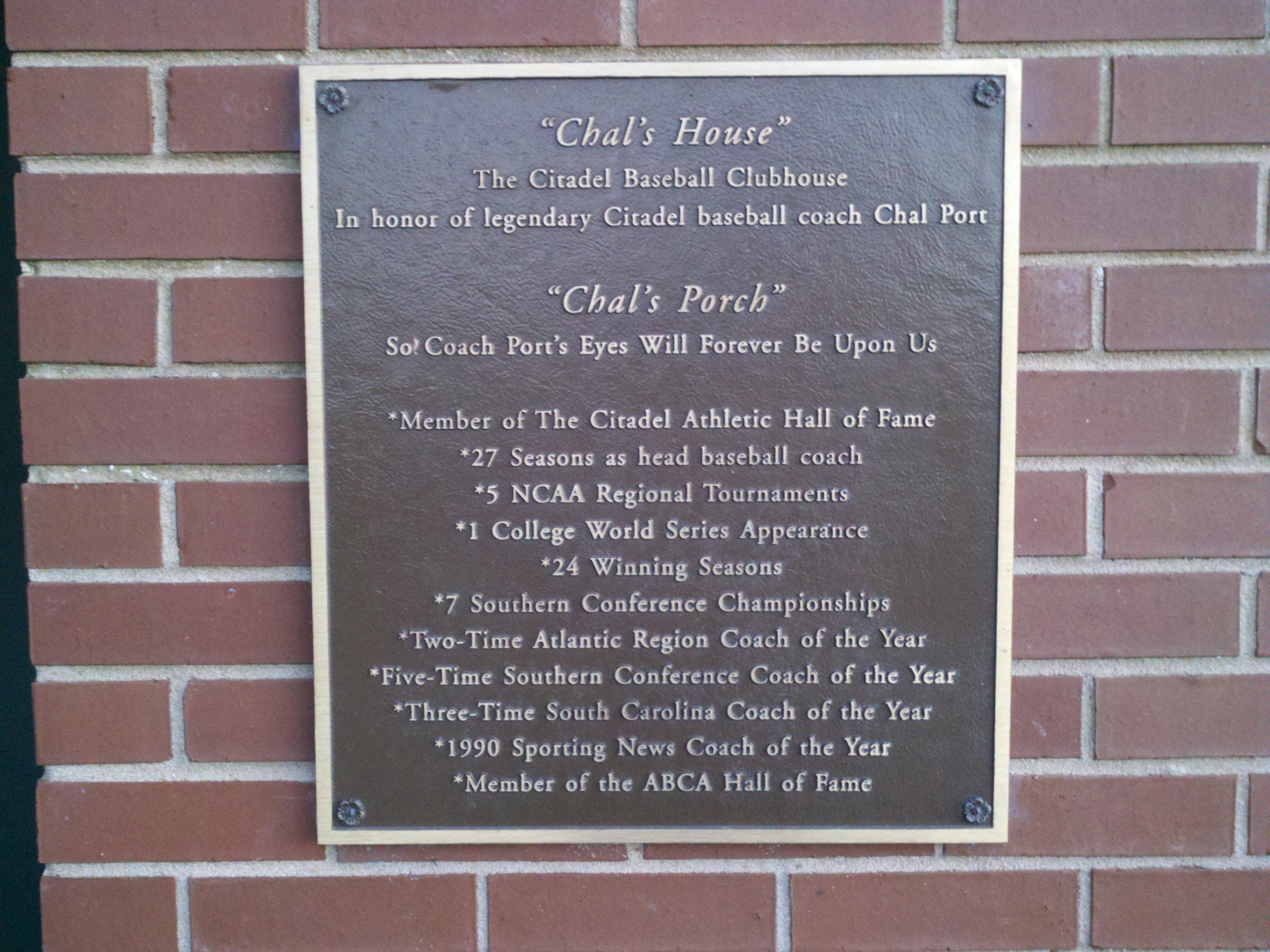
Plaque honoring Chal Port outside the Bulldog clubhouse at Joseph P. Riley Jr. Park

In his 27 seasons at The Citadel, Port led the Bulldogs to five NCAA Division I Baseball Championship appearances and graduated all but two players he coached.

=== 1990 College World Series season ===
In his second to last season, Port led the 1990 The Citadel Bulldogs baseball team in a dominant season, claiming the Southern Conference regular season and tournament championships, the nation's longest winning streak of 26 games, and the school's first appearance in the College World Series. Sweeping through the SoCon Tournament and the Atlantic Regional in Coral Gables, Florida, the Bulldogs defeated national power Miami (FL) on its home field twice to advance to Omaha. Following an opening round loss to LSU, the Bulldogs defeated Cal State Fullerton in extra innings. The Citadel was eliminated by LSU in its third game in Omaha. The Bulldogs were ranked sixth in the Collegiate Baseball final poll. Following the season, Port was named Sporting News National Baseball Coach of the Year.

== Quips ==
Port was known for his sense of humor and once said that while important people often get buildings named for them, he had a building named for him as well: the Port-a-let.

== Head coaching record ==
Record table
Season	Team	Overall	Conference	Standing	Postseason
The Citadel Bulldogs (Southern Conference) (1965–1991)
1965	The Citadel	12–12	9–7	5th	
1966	The Citadel	8–16	3–9	8th	
1967	The Citadel	9–16	6–9	7th	
1968	The Citadel	16–10	4–5	6th	
1969	The Citadel	18–10	10–6	2nd (South)	
1970	The Citadel	15–12–1	6–8–1	3rd (South)	
1971	The Citadel	22–9	11–5	T–1st	
1972	The Citadel	17–13	9–7	4th	
1973	The Citadel	16–14	8–5	3rd	
1974	The Citadel	17–11	7–7	4th	
1975	The Citadel	21–9	11–3	1st	NCAA Regionals
1976	The Citadel	18–9	7–4	3rd	
1977	The Citadel	21–11	10–4	3rd	
1978	The Citadel	30–9	9–5	3rd	
1979	The Citadel	27–15	13–3	1st	NCAA Regionals
1980	The Citadel	23–14	9–6	5th	
1981	The Citadel	31–13	11–5	4th	
1982	The Citadel	40–8	14–2	1st	NCAA Regionals
1983	The Citadel	34–10	12–2	1st	NCAA Regionals
1984	The Citadel	26–21	12–5	2nd (South)	
1985	The Citadel	29–20	8–10	3rd (South)	
1986	The Citadel	29–20	9–9	3rd (South)	
1987	The Citadel	19–31	6–12	3rd (South)	
1988	The Citadel	33–20	12–6	2nd (South)	
1989	The Citadel	30–20	8–9	5th	
1990	The Citadel	46–14	13–1	1st	College World Series
1991	The Citadel	34–19–1	16–2	1st	
Total:		641–386–2 (.624)			
National champion Postseason invitational champion Conference regular season champion Conference regular season and conference tournament champion Division regular season champion Division regular season and conference tournament champion Conference tournament champion
