= 1990 Stanford Cardinal baseball team =

American college baseball season

1990 Stanford Cardinal baseball

Pacific-10 Conference South Division champions West I Regional champions

College World Series, 3rd
- Conference: Pacific 10 Conference

Ranking
- Coaches: No. 3
- CB: No. 3
- Record: 59–12 (24–6 Pac-10)
- Head coach: Mark Marquess (14th season)
- Home stadium: Sunken Diamond

1990 Pacific-10 Conference baseball standings
	Conf.				Overall
Team	W		L	PCT	W		L	PCT
Northern
No. 18 Washington State ^{x}‍‍‍^{y}	19	–	5	.792	47	–	19	.712
Oregon State ‍‍‍	15	–	9	.625	30	–	22	.577
Washington ‍‍‍	14	–	10	.583	30	–	19	.612
Gonzaga ‍‍‍	13	–	11	.542	37	–	21	.638
Portland ‍‍‍	10	–	14	.417	26	–	25	.510
Portland State ‍‍‍	9	–	15	.375	30	–	24	.556
Eastern Washington ‍‍‍	4	–	20	.167	14	–	36	.280
Southern
No. 3 Stanford ^{x}‍‍‍^{y}	24	–	6	.800	59	–	12	.831
No. 9 Arizona State ‍‍‍^{y}	21	–	9	.700	60	–	13	.822
No. 11 Southern California ‍‍‍^{y}	18	–	12	.600	40	–	22	.645
No. 19 UCLA ‍‍‍^{y}	14	–	16	.467	41	–	26	.612
Arizona ‍‍‍	11	–	19	.367	26	–	34	.433
California ‍‍‍	3	–	27	.100	18	–	43	.295
x – Division champion y – Invited to the NCAA tournament As of June 30, 1990; Rankings from Collegiate Baseball

The 1990 Stanford Cardinal baseball team represented Stanford University in the 1990 NCAA Division I baseball season. The Cardinal played their home games at Sunken Diamond. The team was coached by Mark Marquess in his 14th year at Stanford.

The Cardinal won the Pacific-10 Conference South Division and the West I Regional to advanced to the College World Series, where they were defeated by the Georgia Bulldogs.

== Roster ==
1990 Stanford Cardinal baseball team
Players
Coaches

#	Pos.	Name	B/T	Height	Weight	Year	Home town
	INF	Roger Burnett	R/R	6 ft 1 in (1.85 m)	185 lb (84 kg)	So	Broken Arrow, Oklahoma
	OF	Paul Carey	L/R	6 ft 4 in (1.93 m)	220 lb (100 kg)	Sr	Dorchester, Massachusetts
		Tony Detter	/	—	—
	RHP	Aaron Dorlarque	R/R	6 ft 3 in (1.91 m)	190 lb (86 kg)	So
		Mike Eicher	/	—	—	Sr
		Todd French	/	—	—	Sr
	INF	Tim Griffin	R/R	6 ft 1 in (1.85 m)	185 lb (84 kg)	Jr
	OF	Jeffrey Hammonds	R/R	6 ft 0 in (1.83 m)	195 lb (88 kg)	Fr	Plainfield, New Jersey
		David Holbrook	/	—	—	So
	P	Rob Kamerschen	/	—	—	Sr
		Chris Kemper	/	—	—
	RHP	Jeff Light	R/R	6 ft 4 in (1.93 m)	210 lb (95 kg)
	RHP	John Lynch	R/R	6 ft 2 in (1.88 m)	215 lb (98 kg)
		Jeff McArthur	/	—	—
	INF	David McCarty	R/L	6 ft 5 in (1.96 m)	210 lb (95 kg)	So	Houston, Texas
		Rob Milo	/	—	—
	RHP	Greg Mix	R/R	6 ft 4 in (1.93 m)	225 lb (102 kg)	Fr	Albuquerque, New Mexico
	RHP	Tim Moore	R/R	6 ft 4 in (1.93 m)	190 lb (86 kg)	Fr	Irving, Texas
	RHP	Mike Mussina	L/R	6 ft 2 in (1.88 m)	185 lb (84 kg)	Jr	Montoursville, Pennsylvania
	INF	Troy Paulsen	R/R	5 ft 11 in (1.8 m)	180 lb (82 kg)	Jr	Westminster, California
	RHP	John Reid	R/R	6 ft 5 in (1.96 m)	185 lb (84 kg)	Jr
		Rob Robbins	/	—	—
	RHP	Brain Sackinsky	R/R	6 ft 4 in (1.93 m)	220 lb (100 kg)	Fr	South Park, Pennsylvania
	RHP	Jamie Sepeda	R/R	6 ft 2 in (1.88 m)	200 lb (91 kg)	Fr	Sinton, Texas
	C	Mark Skeels	S/R	5 ft 11 in (1.8 m)	195 lb (88 kg)	Fr	Palm Springs, California
	OF	Steve Solomon	L/L	6 ft 0 in (1.83 m)	180 lb (82 kg)	So
	RHP	Stan Spencer	R/R	6 ft 4 in (1.93 m)	195 lb (88 kg)	Jr	Vancouver, Washington
	C	Troy Tallman	R/R	6 ft 0 in (1.83 m)	195 lb (88 kg)	So	Napa, California
		Bryan Taylor	/	—	—
		Greg Tripaldi	/	—	—
		Ryan Turner	/	—	—
	RHP	Scott Weiss	R/R	6 ft 1 in (1.85 m)	175 lb (79 kg)	So	Quartz Hill, California
	LHP	Steve Worrell	L/L	6 ft 2 in (1.88 m)	200 lb (91 kg)	So	Cape May, New Jersey

Head coach

Mark Marquess

Assistant coach(es)

Legend

- (C) Team captain
- (S) Suspended
- (I) Ineligible
- Injured
- Current redshirt

Roster
Last update: January 13, 2021

== Schedule ==
1990 Stanford Cardinal baseball game log
Regular season
January (3–0)

#	Date	Opponent	Site/stadium	Score	Overall record	Pac-10 record
1	January 26	at Santa Clara	Stephen Schott Stadium • Santa Clara, California	6–0	1–0	–
2	January 28	Santa Clara	Sunken Diamond • Stanford, California	6–4	2–0	–
3	January 31	San Francisco	Sunken Diamond • Stanford, California	15–5	3–0	–

February (12–5)

#	Date	Opponent	Site/stadium	Score	Overall record	Pac-10 record
4	February 2	Cal State Fullerton	Sunken Diamond • Stanford, California	8–1	4–0	–
5	February 3	Cal State Fullerton	Sunken Diamond • Stanford, California	1–0	5–0	–
6	February 4	Cal State Fullerton	Sunken Diamond • Stanford, California	8–7	6–0	–
7	February 5	Sacramento State	Sunken Diamond • Stanford, California	1–9	6–1	–
8	February 9	at Hawaii	Rainbow Stadium • Honolulu, Hawaii	12–6	7–1	–
9	February 10	at Hawaii	Rainbow Stadium • Honolulu, Hawaii	11–2	8–1	–
10	February 11	at Hawaii	Rainbow Stadium • Honolulu, Hawaii	8–2	9–1	–
11	February 13	San Jose State	Sunken Diamond • Stanford, California	4–3	10–1	–
12	February 18	at UCLA	Jackie Robinson Stadium • Los Angeles, California	16–5	11–1	1–0
13	February 19	at UCLA	Jackie Robinson Stadium • Los Angeles, California	3–5	11–2	1–1
14	February 19	at UCLA	Jackie Robinson Stadium • Los Angeles, California	6–5	12–2	2–1
15	February 20	Saint Mary's	Sunken Diamond • Stanford, California	5–6	12–3	2–1
16	February 23	at Southern California	Dedeaux Field • Los Angeles, California	3–5	12–4	2–2
17	February 24	at Southern California	Dedeaux Field • Los Angeles, California	5–2	13–4	3–2
18	February 25	at Southern California	Dedeaux Field • Los Angeles, California	14–5	13–5	3–3
19	February 26	Lewis–Clark State	Sunken Diamond • Stanford, California	19–3	14–5	3–3
20	February 27	UC Davis	Sunken Diamond • Stanford, California	6–5	15–5	3–3

March (11–1)

#	Date	Opponent	Site/stadium	Score	Overall record	Pac-10 record
21	March 3	Arizona State	Sunken Diamond • Stanford, California	3–2	16–5	4–3
22	March 5	Arizona State	Sunken Diamond • Stanford, California	14–8	17–5	5–3
23	March 6	Santa Clara	Sunken Diamond • Stanford, California	9–5	18–5	5–3
24	March 9	Arizona	Sunken Diamond • Stanford, California	8–2	19–5	6–3
25	March 10	Arizona	Sunken Diamond • Stanford, California	7–4	20–5	7–3
26	March 11	Arizona	Sunken Diamond • Stanford, California	8–2	21–5	8–3
27	March 24	at Fresno State	Pete Beiden Field at Bob Bennett Stadium • Fresno, California	9–2	22–5	8–3
28	March 25	at Fresno State	Pete Beiden Field at Bob Bennett Stadium • Fresno, California	3–4	22–6	8–3
29	March 26	at Fresno State	Pete Beiden Field at Bob Bennett Stadium • Fresno, California	5–3	23–6	8–3
30	March 29	at Long Beach State	Blair Field • Long Beach, California	12–8	24–6	8–3
31	March 30	at Minnesota	Hubert H. Humphrey Metrodome • Minneapolis, Minnesota	10–4	25–6	8–3
32	March 31	vs Wichita State	Hubert H. Humphrey Metrodome • Minneapolis, Minnesota	10–1	26–6	8–3

April (16–3)

#	Date	Opponent	Site/stadium	Score	Overall record	Pac-10 record
33	April 1	vs Miami (FL)	Hubert H. Humphrey Metrodome • Minneapolis, Minnesota	3–4	26–7	8–3
34	April 3	Pacific	Sunken Diamond • Stanford, California	16–2	27–7	8–3
35	April 6	UCLA	Sunken Diamond • Stanford, California	6–1	28–7	9–3
36	April 7	UCLA	Sunken Diamond • Stanford, California	9–7	29–7	10–3
37	April 8	UCLA	Sunken Diamond • Stanford, California	11–8	30–7	11–3
38	April 9	at San Jose State	San Jose Municipal Stadium • San Jose, California	6–5	31–7	11–3
39	April 12	California	Sunken Diamond • Stanford, California	11–1	32–7	12–3
40	April 13	at California	Evans Diamond • Berkeley, California	14–9	33–7	13–3
41	April 14	California	Sunken Diamond • Stanford, California	11–9	34–7	14–3
42	April 17	at Santa Clara	Buck Shaw Stadium • Santa Clara, California	10–3	35–7	14–3
43	April 20	at Arizona	Jerry Kindall Field at Frank Sancet Stadium • Tucson, Arizona	5–3	36–7	15–3
44	April 21	at Arizona	Jerry Kindall Field at Frank Sancet Stadium • Tucson, Arizona	9–3	37–7	16–3
45	April 22	at Arizona	Jerry Kindall Field at Frank Sancet Stadium • Tucson, Arizona	13–5	38–7	17–3
46	April 23	Stanislaus State	Sunken Diamond • Stanford, California	14–8	39–7	17–3
47	April 24	at San Francisco	Dante Benedetti Diamond at Max Ulrich Field • San Francisco, California	13–0	40–7	17–3
48	April 27	at Arizona State	Packard Stadium • Tempe, Arizona	10–9	41–7	18–3
49	April 27	at Arizona State	Packard Stadium • Tempe, Arizona	1–16	41–8	18–4
50	April 28	at Arizona State	Packard Stadium • Tempe, Arizona	10–7	42–8	19–4
51	April 29	at Arizona State	Packard Stadium • Tempe, Arizona	6–13	42–9	19–5

May (9–1)

#	Date	Opponent	Site/stadium	Score	Overall record	Pac-10 record
52	May 1	at Saint Mary's	Louis Guisto Field • Moraga, California	10–3	43–9	19–5
53	May 4	at California	Evans Diamond • Berkeley, California	15–9	44–9	20–5
54	May 5	California	Sunken Diamond • Stanford, California	15–1	45–9	21–5
55	May 6	at California	Evans Diamond • Berkeley, California	3–2	46–9	22–5
56	May 8	at San Francisco State	Maloney Field • San Francisco, California	10–6	47–9	22–5
57	May 11	Southern California	Sunken Diamond • Stanford, California	2–1	48–9	23–5
58	May 12	Southern California	Sunken Diamond • Stanford, California	2–3	48–10	23–6
59	May 13	Southern California	Sunken Diamond • Stanford, California	6–1	49–10	24–6
60	May 18	UC Santa Barbara	Sunken Diamond • Stanford, California	6–2	50–10	24–6
61	May 19	UC Santa Barbara	Sunken Diamond • Stanford, California	6–4	51–10	24–6
62	May 20	UC Santa Barbara	Sunken Diamond • Stanford, California	13–11	52–10	24–6

Postseason
NCAA West I Regional (3–1)

#	Date	Opponent	Site/stadium	Score	Overall record	Pac-10 record
63	May 24	Campbell	Sunken Diamond • Stanford, California	7–0	53–10	24–6
64	May 25	Middle Tennessee State	Sunken Diamond • Stanford, California	6–1	54–10	24–6
65	May 26	San Diego State	Sunken Diamond • Stanford, California	6–2	55–10	24–6
66	May 28	San Diego State	Sunken Diamond • Stanford, California	6–2	56–10	24–6

College World Series (3–2)

#	Date	Opponent	Site/stadium	Score	Overall record	Pac-10 record
67	June 1	vs Georgia Southern	Johnny Rosenblatt Stadium • Omaha, Nebraska	5–4	57–10	24–6
68	June 3	vs Georgia	Johnny Rosenblatt Stadium • Omaha, Nebraska	2–16	57–11	24–6
69	June 5	vs Mississippi State	Johnny Rosenblatt Stadium • Omaha, Nebraska	6–1	58–11	24–6
70	June 6	vs Georgia	Johnny Rosenblatt Stadium • Omaha, Nebraska	4–2	59–11	24–6
71	June 8	vs Georgia	Johnny Rosenblatt Stadium • Omaha, Nebraska	1–5	59–12	24–6

== Awards and honors ==
Paul Carey

- All-Pac-10 South Division
- Second Team All-American Baseball America

Tim Griffin

- All-Pac-10 South Division
- Second Team All-American Baseball America

Jeffrey Hammonds

- All-Pac-10 South Division
- First Team All-American Baseball America
- First Team All-American The Sports Network
- First Team Freshman All-American Baseball America
- Freshman of the Year Baseball America
- Freshman of the Year Collegiate Baseball
- College World Series All-Tournament Team

Troy Paulsen

- All-Pac-10 South Division
- College World Series All-Tournament Team

Brian Sackinsky

- Second Team Freshman All-American Baseball America

Stan Spencer

- All-Pac-10 South Division
- First Team All-American American Baseball Coaches Association
- First Team All-American Baseball America
- First Team All-American The Sports Network
