= 1990 Colonial Athletic Association baseball tournament =

American college baseball tournament

- Teams: 6
- Format: Double-elimination tournament
- Finals site: Brooks Field; Wilmington, North Carolina
- Champions: East Carolina (3rd title)
- Winning coach: Gary Overton (3rd title)
- MVP: Calvin Brown (East Carolina)

1990 Colonial Athletic Association baseball standings
	Conf.						Overall
Team	W		L		T	PCT	W		L		T	PCT
East Carolina ‍†‍‡‍^{y}	11	–	2	–	0	.846	47	–	9	–	0	.839
Richmond ‍‍‍	9	–	4	–	0	.692	27	–	19	–	1	.585
UNC Wilmington ‍‍‍	5	–	6	–	0	.455	23	–	25	–	0	.479
George Mason ‍‍‍	6	–	8	–	0	.429	23	–	25	–	0	.479
James Madison ‍‍‍	3	–	5	–	0	.375	28	–	30	–	0	.483
William & Mary ‍‍‍	1	–	10	–	0	.091	9	–	31	–	1	.232
† – Conference champion ‡ – Tournament champion y – Invited to the NCAA tournament As of June 30, 1990; Rankings from Collegiate Baseball

The 1990 Colonial Athletic Association baseball tournament was held at Brooks Field on the campus of UNC Wilmington in Wilmington, North Carolina, from May 11 through 14. The event determined the champion of the Colonial Athletic Association for the 1990 season. Top-seeded East Carolina won the tournament for the third time and earned the CAA's automatic bid to the 1990 NCAA Division I baseball tournament.

Entering the event, East Carolina had won the most championships, with two. George Mason and Richmond had each won once.

== Format and seeding ==
The CAA's six teams were seeded one to six based on winning percentage from the conference's round robin regular season. They played a double-elimination tournament with first round matchups of the top and bottom seeds, second and fifth seeds, and third and fourth seeds.

Team	W	L	Pct.	GB	Seed
East Carolina	11	2	.846	—	1
Richmond	9	4	.692	2	2
UNC Wilmington	5	6	.455	5	3
George Mason	6	8	.429	5.5	4
James Madison	3	5	.375	5.5	5
William & Mary	1	10	.091	9	6

== Bracket and results ==
First round
1	East Carolina	16
6	William & Mary	4
3	UNC Wilmington	7
4	George Mason	11
2	Richmond	2^{10}
5	James Madison	1

Second round
1	East Carolina	13
5	James Madison	5
4	George Mason	6
2	Richmond	5
6	William & Mary	6
3	UNC Wilmington	21

Third round
1	East Carolina	11
4	George Mason	6
2	Richmond	2
3	UNC Wilmington	1

Semifinals
4	George Mason	7
2	Richmond	0

Final
1	East Carolina	12	—
4	George Mason	7	—

== Most Valuable Player ==
Calvin Brown was named Tournament Most Valuable Player. Brown was a first baseman for East Carolina.
