= 1990 Southwest Conference baseball tournament =

- Teams: 4
- Format: Double-elimination tournament
- Finals site: Disch–Falk Field; Austin, TX
- Champions: Texas (9th title)
- Winning coach: Cliff Gustafson (9th title)

1990 Southwest Conference baseball standings
| | Conf. | | | | Overall |
| Team | W | | L | PCT | W | | L | PCT |
|---|---|---|---|---|---|---|---|---|
| No. 14 Arkansas ‍†‍‍^{y} | 16 | – | 5 | .762 | 47 | – | 15 | .758 |
| No. 13 Texas ‍‍‡‍^{y} | 15 | – | 5 | .750 | 51 | – | 17 | .750 |
| No. 24 Houston ‍‍‍^{y} | 12 | – | 9 | .571 | 44 | – | 23 | .657 |
| Rice ‍‍‍ | 11 | – | 9 | .550 | 33 | – | 29 | .532 |
| Texas A&M ‍‍‍ | 11 | – | 10 | .524 | 43 | – | 17 | .717 |
| Baylor ‍‍‍ | 9 | – | 12 | .429 | 33 | – | 19 | .635 |
| Texas Tech ‍‍‍ | 5 | – | 16 | .238 | 31 | – | 29 | .517 |
| TCU ‍‍‍ | 4 | – | 17 | .190 | 27 | – | 32 | .458 |
† – Conference champion ‡ – Tournament champion y – Invited to the NCAA tournament As of June 30, 1990; Rankings from Collegiate Baseball

The 1990 Southwest Conference baseball tournament was the league's annual postseason tournament used to determine the Southwest Conference's (SWC) automatic bid to the 1990 NCAA Division I baseball tournament. The tournament was held from May 17 through 19 at Disch–Falk Field on the campus of the University of Texas in Austin, Texas.

The number 2 seed Texas Longhorns went 3–0 to win the team's 9th SWC tournament under head coach Cliff Gustafson.

== Format and seeding ==
The tournament featured the top four finishers of the SWC's eight teams in a double-elimination tournament.

| Place | Team | Conference | | | | Overall | | | Seed |
| Place | Team | W | L | % | GB | W | L | % | Seed |
|---|---|---|---|---|---|---|---|---|---|
| 1 | Arkansas | 16 | 5 | .762 | - | 47 | 15 | .758 | 1 |
| 2 | Texas | 15 | 5 | .750 | 0.5 | 51 | 17 | .750 | 2 |
| 3 | Houston | 12 | 9 | .571 | 4 | 44 | 23 | .657 | 3 |
| 4 | Rice | 11 | 9 | .550 | 4.5 | 33 | 29 | .532 | 4 |
| 5 | Texas A&M | 11 | 10 | .524 | 5 | 43 | 17 | .717 | - |
| 6 | Baylor | 9 | 12 | .429 | 7 | 33 | 19 | .635 | - |
| 7 | Texas Tech | 5 | 16 | .238 | 11 | 31 | 29 | .517 | - |
| 8 | TCU | 4 | 17 | .190 | 12 | 27 | 32 | .458 | - |

== Tournament ==
Upper round 1
1 | Arkansas | 7
4 | Rice | 5
2 | Texas | 9
3 | Houston | 1
Lower round 1
4 | Rice | 0
3 | Houston | 11

Upper final
1 | Arkansas | 4
2 | Texas | 11
Lower final
1 | Arkansas | 1
3 | Houston | 7

Final
2 | Texas | 6 | –
3 | Houston | 4 | –
