= 1990 Oklahoma State Cowboys baseball team =

American college baseball season

1990 Oklahoma State Cowboys baseball

Big 8 Champions West II Regional champions

College World Series, 2nd
- Conference: Big Eight Conference
- CB: No. 2
- Record: 56–16 (18–6 Big 8)
- Head coach: Gary Ward (13th year)
- Home stadium: Allie P. Reynolds Stadium

1990 Big Eight Conference baseball standings
	Conf.				Overall
Team	W		L	PCT	W		L	PCT
No. 2 Oklahoma State ^{†‡y} ‍‍‍	18	–	6	.750	56	–	17	.767
Kansas State ‍‍‍	13	–	11	.542	30	–	27	.526
Nebraska ‍‍‍	12	–	12	.500	42	–	26	.618
Iowa State ‍‍‍	11	–	13	.458	33	–	27	.550
Missouri ‍‍‍	11	–	13	.458	28	–	27	.509
Kansas ‍‍‍	10	–	14	.417	27	–	31	.466
Oklahoma ‍‍‍	9	–	15	.375	31	–	26	.544
† – Conference champion ‡ – Tournament champion y – Invited to the NCAA tournament As of June 30, 1990; Rankings from Collegiate Baseball

The 1990 Oklahoma State Cowboys baseball team represented Oklahoma State University–Stillwater in the 1990 NCAA Division I baseball season. The Cowboys played their home games at Allie P. Reynolds Stadium in Stillwater, Oklahoma. The team was coached by Gary Ward in his thirteenth season at Oklahoma State.

The Cowboys reached the College World Series, finishing as the runner up to Georgia.

The Cowboys also won the Big Eight Conference championship, the tenth in a string of sixteen consecutive conference titles which lasted until the league merged with the Southwest Conference.

== Roster ==
1990 Oklahoma State Cowboys roster
- Derek Brandow; - Brad Dolejsi; - Michael Esquibel; - Emmanuelle Gagliano; - Brad Gore; - Leonard Johnson; - Billy Kanwisher; - Todd Manley; - Brian Purvis; - Kelly Reavis; - Leron Rogers; - James Simons; - Eric Slinkard; - Greg Walbergh; - Neil Szeryk; - Bill Scrivner	Pitchers: - Dennis Burbank; - Ron Gerstein; - Donnie Gobel; - Dave Mlicki; - Ritchie Moody; - Gordon Tipton	Infielders: - Brad Beanblossom; - Bobby Carlsen; - Manuel Cervantes; - Mitchel Simons; Catchers: - Michael Daniel; - Todd Shelton; - Bill Scrivner	Outfielders: - Jeromy Burnitz; - Steve Dailey; - Brian Kelly; - Danny Perez

== Schedule ==
Legend
Oklahoma State win
Oklahoma State loss

1990 Oklahoma State Cowboys baseball game log
Regular season

February
Date	Opponent	Site/stadium	Score	Overall record	Big 8 record
Feb 18	Missouri Southern*	Allie P. Reynolds Stadium • Stillwater, OK	W 8–7^{10}	1–0	
Feb 24	Northern Iowa*	Allie P. Reynolds Stadium • Stillwater, OK	W 10–0	2–0	
Feb 24	Texas Wesleyan*	Allie P. Reynolds Stadium • Stillwater, OK	W 15–4	3–0	
Feb 25	Northern Iowa*	Allie P. Reynolds Stadium • Stillwater, OK	W 15–3	4–0	
Feb 25	Texas Wesleyan*	Allie P. Reynolds Stadium • Stillwater, OK	W 9–8	5–0	

March
Date	Opponent	Site/stadium	Score	Overall record	Big 8 record
Mar 3	vs Stephen F. Austin*	UFCU Disch–Falk Field • Austin, TX	W 5–1	6–0	
Mar 4	vs Southwest Texas State*	UFCU Disch–Falk Field • Austin, TX	W 4–1	7–0	
Mar 4	vs Southwest Louisiana*	UFCU Disch–Falk Field • Austin, TX	W 9–6^{11}	8–0	
Mar 6	at Texas–Arlington*	Clay Gould Ballpark • Arlington, TX	W 13–7	9–0	
Mar 8	at Baylor*	Ferrell Field • Waco, TX	W 12–9	10–0	
Mar 10	New Mexico State*	Allie P. Reynolds Stadium • Stillwater, OK	W 9–6	11–0	
Mar 12	New Mexico State*	Allie P. Reynolds Stadium • Stillwater, OK	W 21–9	12–0	
Mar 12	New Mexico State*	Allie P. Reynolds Stadium • Stillwater, OK	W 8–5	13–0	
Mar 13	Oklahoma City*	Allie P. Reynolds Stadium • Stillwater, OK	W 13–3	14–0	
Mar 16	vs TCU*	Bossier City, LA (Bossier City Classic)	L 4–16	14–1	
Mar 17	vs Louisiana Tech*	Bossier City, LA (Bossier City Classic)	W 16–13	15–1	
Mar 18	vs Illinois State*	Bossier City, LA (Bossier City Classic)	W 11–9	16–1	
Mar 19	Arkansas–Little Rock*	Allie P. Reynolds Stadium • Stillwater, OK	W 21–7	17–1	
Mar 20	Stephen F. Austin*	Allie P. Reynolds Stadium • Stillwater, OK	W 18–8	18–1	
Mar 21	at Oklahoma*	L. Dale Mitchell Baseball Park • Norman, OK (Bedlam Series)	L 6–7^{10}	18–2	0–1
Mar 24	vs Iona*	Les Murakami Stadium • Honolulu, HI	W 16–2	19–2	
Mar 25	vs Georgia Tech*	Les Murakami Stadium • Honolulu, HI (Rainbow Classic)	L 2–8	19–3	
Mar 25	at Hawaii*	Les Murakami Stadium • Honolulu, HI (Rainbow Classic)	L 8–10	19–4	
Mar 26	vs Wright State*	Les Murakami Stadium • Honolulu, HI (Rainbow Classic)	W 10–4	20–4	
Mar 27	vs Creighton*	Les Murakami Stadium • Honolulu, HI (Rainbow Classic)	W 5–0	21–4	
Mar 28	vs Wright State*	Les Murakami Stadium • Honolulu, HI (Rainbow Classic)	W 5–0	22–4	
Mar 29	vs Iona*	Les Murakami Stadium • Honolulu, HI (Rainbow Classic)	L 2–3	22–5	
Mar 30	vs Georgia Tech*	Les Murakami Stadium • Honolulu, HI (Rainbow Classic)	W 7–4	23–5	
Mar 30	at Hawaii*	Les Murakami Stadium • Honolulu, HI (Rainbow Classic)	L 1–6	23–6	
Mar 31	vs Creighton*	Les Murakami Stadium • Honolulu, HI (Rainbow Classic)	L 1–6	23–7	

April
Date	Opponent	Site/stadium	Score	Overall record	Big 8 record
Apr 3	Wichita State*	Allie P. Reynolds Stadium • Stillwater, OK	L 9–12	23–8	
Apr 4	at Wichita State*	Eck Stadium • Wichita, KS	L 5–7	23–9	
Apr 6	at Missouri	Columbia, MO	W 12–4	24–9	1–1
Apr 7	at Missouri	Columbia, MO	W 10–7	25–9	2–1
Apr 7	at Missouri	Columbia, MO	W 8–7	26–9	3–1
Apr 8	at Missouri	Columbia, MO	L 3–4	26–10	3–2
Apr 10	Houston*	Allie P. Reynolds Stadium • Stillwater, OK	W 15–0	27–10	
Apr 11	Houston*	Allie P. Reynolds Stadium • Stillwater, OK	L 4–10	27–11	
Apr 14	Kansas	Allie P. Reynolds Stadium • Stillwater, OK	W 5–4	28–11	4–2
Apr 15	Kansas	Allie P. Reynolds Stadium • Stillwater, OK	W 4–3	29–11	5–2
Apr 15	Kansas	Allie P. Reynolds Stadium • Stillwater, OK	W 13–10	30–11	6–2
Apr 16	Kansas	Allie P. Reynolds Stadium • Stillwater, OK	W 5–2	31–11	7–2
Apr 17	Texas–Arlington*	Allie P. Reynolds Stadium • Stillwater, OK	W 6–2	32–11	
Apr 18	Texas–Arlington*	Allie P. Reynolds Stadium • Stillwater, OK	W 8–5	33–11	
Apr 20	at Nebraska	Buck Belzer Stadium • Lincoln, NE	W 12–3	34–11	8–2
Apr 21	at Nebraska	Buck Belzer Stadium • Lincoln, NE	L 4–5	34–12	8–3
Apr 21	at Nebraska	Buck Belzer Stadium • Lincoln, NE	W 5–0	35–12	9–3
Apr 22	at Nebraska	Buck Belzer Stadium • Lincoln, NE	W 12–0	36–12	10–3
Apr 24	vs Arkansas*	Drillers Stadium • Tulsa, OK	L 5–7	36–13	
Apr 28	Iowa State	Allie P. Reynolds Stadium • Stillwater, OK	L 2–4	36–14	10–4
Apr 28	Iowa State	Allie P. Reynolds Stadium • Stillwater, OK	W 4–2	37–14	11–4
Apr 29	Iowa State	Allie P. Reynolds Stadium • Stillwater, OK	W 9–3	38–14	12–4
Apr 29	Iowa State	Allie P. Reynolds Stadium • Stillwater, OK	W 4–1	39–14	13–4

May
Date	Opponent	Site/stadium	Score	Overall record	Big 8 record
May 4	vs Oklahoma	All Sports Stadium • Oklahoma City, OK (Bedlam Series)	L 5–9	39–15	13–5
May 5	vs Oklahoma	All Sports Stadium • Oklahoma City, OK (Bedlam Series)	W 6–3	40–15	14–5
May 5	vs Oklahoma	All Sports Stadium • Oklahoma City, OK (Bedlam Series)	W 10–7	41–15	15–5
May 7	Rice*	Allie P. Reynolds Stadium • Stillwater, OK	W 14–4	42–15	
May 8	Rice*	Allie P. Reynolds Stadium • Stillwater, OK	W 11–1	43–15	
May 12	Kansas State	Allie P. Reynolds Stadium • Stillwater, OK	W 5–3	44–15	16–4
May 12	Kansas State	Allie P. Reynolds Stadium • Stillwater, OK	W 13–3	45–15	17–5
May 13	Kansas State	Allie P. Reynolds Stadium • Stillwater, OK	L 3–9	45–16	17–6
May 13	Kansas State	Allie P. Reynolds Stadium • Stillwater, OK	W 14–2	46–16	18–6

Postseason

Big Eight Tournament
Date	Opponent	Site/stadium	Score	Overall record	Big 8 T Record
May 16	Iowa State	Allie P. Reynolds Stadium • Stillwater, OK	W 11–6	47–16	1–0
May 17	Nebraska	Allie P. Reynolds Stadium • Stillwater, OK	W 3–2	48–16	2–0
May 19	Iowa State	Allie P. Reynolds Stadium • Stillwater, OK	W 4–3	49–16	3–0

NCAA West II Regional
Date	Opponent	Site/stadium	Score	Overall record	NCAAT record
May 25	(5) UC Santa Barbara	Packard Stadium • Tempe, AZ	W 7–2	50–16	1–0
May 26	(4) Washington State	Packard Stadium • Tempe, AZ	W 14–0	51–16	2–0
May 27	at (1) Arizona State	Packard Stadium • Tempe, AZ	W 17–9	52–16	3–0
May 28	at (1) Arizona State	Packard Stadium • Tempe, AZ	W 10–5	53–16	4–0

College World Series
Date	Opponent	Site/stadium	Score	Overall record	CWS record
June 2	(6) Cal State Fullerton	Johnny Rosenblatt Stadium • Omaha, NE	W 14–4	54–16	1–0
June 4	(2) LSU	Johnny Rosenblatt Stadium • Omaha, NE	W 7–1	55–16	2–0
June 7	(2) LSU	Johnny Rosenblatt Stadium • Omaha, NE	W 14–3	56–16	3–0
June 9	(4) Georgia	Johnny Rosenblatt Stadium • Omaha, NE	L 1–2	56–17	3–1
