= Anthony Jenkins =

American baseball player (born 1967)

- Outfielder
- Born: November 29, 1967 (age 58); Ladson, South Carolina, U.S.
- Bats: Right Throws: Right
- Stats at Baseball Reference

Anthony L. Jenkins (born November 29, 1967) is an American former college athlete, known best as a college baseball player for The Citadel Bulldogs baseball team. He was a member of the 1990 College Baseball All-America Team, chosen by the American Baseball Coaches Association as an outfielder. He later played minor league baseball in the St. Louis Cardinals organization. During his playing days, Jenkins was listed at 5 feet 11 inches (1.80 m) and 175 pounds (79 kg) while batting and throwing right-handed.

== Biography ==
Jenkins was raised in Ladson, South Carolina, and attended Stratford High School in Goose Creek, South Carolina, where he earned three varsity letters each in football and baseball. He earned a number of honors in each sport, including all-conference in baseball and all-conference and all-state in football. As a senior, Jenkins was an outfielder and occasional pitcher, earning a 6–1 win–loss record from the mound while batting .340 with four home runs and 17 runs batted in. On the gridiron, Jenkins played defensive back and recorded 10 interceptions in his senior season.

On July 12, 1986, coach Chal Port announced Jenkins' national letter of intent to play baseball and football at The Citadel. Jenkins played cornerback for The Citadel Bulldogs football team in his freshman and sophomore seasons before devoting his efforts to baseball, where he earned a varsity letter in each of his four seasons. In his senior college season, Jenkins and The Citadel Bulldogs baseball team made a dramatic run to the 1990 College World Series. Jenkins set school records for runs, hits, home runs, and total bases in the 1990 season, and most notably scored the winning run in the Bulldogs win over Cal State Fullerton in the 12th inning of an elimination game in Omaha, Nebraska. He was inducted to the athletic hall of fame at The Citadel in 1999, and the Charleston Baseball Hall of Fame in 2007.

Following his breakout baseball season, Jenkins was a 29th round selection of the St. Louis Cardinals during the 1990 Major League Baseball draft. He played two seasons of professional baseball, first with the Johnson City Cardinals of then Appalachian League in 1990, and then for the Savannah Cardinals of the South Atlantic League in 1991. Overall in two seasons, Jenkins batted .217 with six home runs and 19 RBIs in 67 minor league games. He then returned home to Ladson to pursue a business career.
