= 1990 The Citadel Bulldogs baseball team =

American college baseball season

1990 The Citadel Bulldogs baseball
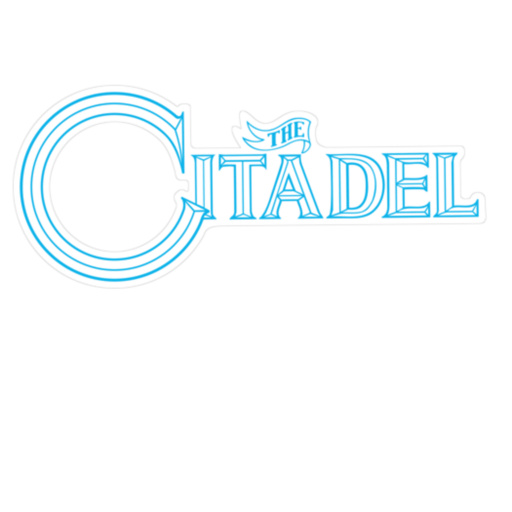

1990 Atlantic Regional champions SoCon Baseball Tournament champions Southern Conference Regular season Champions
- Conference: Southern Conference
- CB: No. 6
- Record: 46–14 (13–1 SoCon)
- Head coach: Chal Port (26th season)
- Home stadium: College Park

1990 Southern Conference baseball standings
	Conf.						Overall
Team	W		L		T	PCT	W		L		T	PCT
No. 6 The Citadel ‍†‍‡‍^{y}	13	–	1	–	0	.929	46	–	14	–	0	.767
Western Carolina ‍‍‍	10	–	7	–	0	.588	37	–	25	–	0	.597
Marshall ‍‍‍	10	–	7	–	0	.588	20	–	19	–	0	.513
VMI ‍‍‍	6	–	8	–	0	.429	12	–	26	–	0	.316
Appalachian State ‍‍‍	6	–	9	–	0	.400	19	–	22	–	1	.464
Furman ‍‍‍	6	–	11	–	0	.353	20	–	24	–	0	.455
East Tennessee State ‍‍‍	4	–	12	–	0	.250	10	–	31	–	0	.244
† – Conference champion ‡ – SoCon Tournament champion y – Invited to the 1990 NCAA Division I baseball tournament As of June 30, 1990; Rankings from Collegiate Baseball

1990 The Citadel Bulldogs baseball team represented The Citadel in the 1990 NCAA Division I baseball season. The Bulldogs played their home games in College Park. The team was coached by Chal Port, in his 26th season at The Citadel.

The Bulldogs won their first Southern Conference baseball tournament, hosted in their home park. They then went on to win the Atlantic Regional of the 1990 NCAA Division I baseball tournament, earning a berth in the 1990 College World Series. During the regular season, The Citadel won 26 consecutive games, the longest of any team in the 1990 season. The Bulldogs were ranked #6 in the final Collegiate Baseball poll.

Three players from the team would go on to serve as head coaches at the Division I level. Dan McDonnell became head coach at Louisville in 2007, Chris Lemonis became head coach at Indiana in 2015, and Tony Skole served as head coach at East Tennessee State from 2000 to 2017 before taking over at The Citadel in 2018.

== Roster ==
1990 The Citadel Bulldogs roster
Pitchers: 21 Steve Basch; 24 Ken Britt; Hal Hayden; 15 Hank Kraft; 16 Kevin McGarvey; 14 Richard Shirer; 22 Brad Stowell	Infielders: 11 Chris Coker; 12 Scott Elvington; Chris Lemonis; 20 Bart Mays; 3 Dan McDonnell; 6 Tony Skole; 1 Phillip Tobin	Outfielders: 23 Billy Baker; 13 Mike Black; 7 Mike Branham; 18 Cornell Caldwell; 19 Vic Correll; 10 Anthony Jenkins; 4 Jason Rychlick; Catchers: 9 Gettys Glaze; 2 Larry Hutto; 8 Derrick Rogers

== Schedule ==
Legend
	The Citadel win
	The Citadel loss
*	Non-Conference game

1990 The Citadel Bulldogs baseball game log
Regular season

February
Date	Opponent	Site/stadium	Score	Overall record	SoCon Record
February 9	Armstrong State*	Savannah, GA	W 5–4	1–0	
February 17	NC State*	College Park • Charleston, SC	L 3–5	1–1	
February 18	NC State*	College Park • Charleston, SC	W 12–1	2–1	
February 21	Augusta*	College Park • Charleston, SC	W 9–4	3–1	
February 24	Davidson*	College Park • Charleston, SC	W 4–3	4–1	
February 24	Davidson*	College Park • Charleston, SC	W 9–7	5–1	
February 25	Davidson*	College Park • Charleston, SC	W 15–4	6–1	
February 26	Gannon*	College Park • Charleston, SC	W 9–2	7–1	
February 27	Gannon*	College Park • Charleston, SC	W 10–6	8–1	

March
Date	Opponent	Site/stadium	Score	Overall record	SoCon Record
March 3	at Campbell*	Taylor Field • Buies Creek, NC	W 4–0	9–1	
March 5	Norfolk State*	College Park • Charleston, SC	W 5–2	10–1	
March 7	Coastal Carolina*	Charles Watson Stadium • Conway, SC	W 7–3	11–1	
March 8	Liberty*	College Park • Charleston, SC	W 10–3	12–1	
March 10	Western Carolina	College Park • Charleston, SC	W 6–3	13–1	1–0
March 10	Western Carolina	College Park • Charleston, SC	W 7–3	14–1	2–0
March 11	Western Carolina	College Park • Charleston, SC	W 10–3	15–1	3–0
March 13	George Mason*	College Park • Charleston, SC	W 9–8	16–1	
March 14	Mount Olive*	College Park • Charleston, SC	W 9–7	17–1	
March 15	Belmont Abbey*	College Park • Charleston, SC	W 7–3	18–1	
March 18	at Appalachian State	Red Lackey Field • Boone, NC	W 10–5	19–1	4–0
March 18	at Appalachian State	Red Lackey Field • Boone, NC	W 5–2	20–1	5–0
March 19	Howard*	College Park • Charleston, SC	W 14–4	21–1	
March 20	Le Moyne*	College Park • Charleston, SC	W 16–11	22–1	
March 21	Le Moyne*	College Park • Charleston, SC	W 5–2	23–1	
March 24	Furman	College Park • Charleston, SC	W 3–1	24–1	6–0
March 24	Furman	College Park • Charleston, SC	W 3–0	25–1	7–0
March 25	Furman	College Park • Charleston, SC	W 3–2	26–1	8–0
March 26	Kent State*	College Park • Charleston, SC	W 13–3	27–1	
March 27	Kent State*	College Park • Charleston, SC	L 1–2	27–2	
March 28	Kent State*	College Park • Charleston, SC	L 7–9	27–3	

April
Date	Opponent	Site/stadium	Score	Overall record	SoCon Record
April 1	at Davidson*	Wildcat Park • Davidson, NC	W 2–1	28–3	
April 1	at Davidson*	Wildcat Park • Davidson, NC	L 7–8	28–4	
April 3	at South Carolina*	Sarge Frye Field • Columbia, SC	L 12–13	28–5	
April 4	Charleston Rainbows* (exh)	College Park • Charleston, SC	W 6–5		
April 7	East Tennessee State	College Park • Charleston, SC	W 8–1	29–5	9–0
April 8	East Tennessee State	College Park • Charleston, SC	L 4–6	29–6	9–1
April 8	East Tennessee State	College Park • Charleston, SC	W 7–0	30–6	10–1
April 10	South Carolina*	College Park • Charleston, SC	L 3–5	30–7	
April 11	at Armstrong State*	Savannah, GA	L 5–21	30–8	
April 13	VMI	College Park • Charleston, SC	W 8–3	31–8	11–1
April 16	USC Spartanburg*	College Park • Charleston, SC	L 4–8	31–9	
April 17	at Baptist*	Buccaneer Ballpark • North Charleston, SC	L 5–7	31–10	
April 18	at Augusta*	Augusta, GA	L 4–12	31–11	
April 19	Armstrong State*	College Park • Charleston, SC	W 4–0	32–11	
April 22	at Marshall	Kennedy Center Field • Huntington, WV	W 4–2	33–11	12–1
April 22	at Marshall	Kennedy Center Field • Huntington, WV	W 18–4	34–11	13–1
April 24	Baptist*	College Park • Charleston, SC	W 8–4	35–11	

Postseason

SoCon Tournament
Date	Opponent	Site/stadium	Score	Overall record	SoConT Record
April 27	Appalachian State	College Park • Charleston, SC	W 7–2	36–11	1–0
April 28	Marshall	College Park • Charleston, SC	W 9–2	37–11	2–0
April 28	East Tennessee State	College Park • Charleston, SC	W 6–0	38–11	3–0
April 29	Western Carolina	College Park • Charleston, SC	W 9–5	39–11	4–0

May
Date	Opponent	Site/stadium	Score	Overall record
May 15	at Armstrong State	Savannah, GA	L 2–4	39–12
May 16	Armstrong State	College Park • Charleston, SC	L 3–4	40–12
May 21	#23 Clemson	College Park • Charleston, SC	W 11–2	41–12

NCAA tournament Atlantic Regional
Date	Opponent	Site/stadium	Score	Overall record	NCAAT record
May 25	NC State	Mark Light Stadium • Coral Gables, FL	W 11–3	42–12	1–0
May 27	East Carolina	Alex Rodriguez Park at Mark Light Field • Coral Gables, FL	W 8–5	43–12	2–0
May 28	at Miami (FL)	Alex Rodriguez Park at Mark Light Field • Coral Gables, FL	W 6–2	44–12	3–0
May 29	at Miami (FL)	Alex Rodriguez Park at Mark Light Field • Coral Gables, FL	W 4–1	45–12	4–0

1990 College World Series
Date	Opponent	Site/stadium	Score	Overall record	CWS record
June 2	(2) LSU	Johnny Rosenblatt Stadium • Omaha, NE	L 2–8	45–13	0–1
June 3	(6) Cal State Fullerton	Johnny Rosenblatt Stadium • Omaha, NE	W 8–7 ^{12}	46–13	1–1
June 4	(2) LSU	Johnny Rosenblatt Stadium • Omaha, NE	L 1–6	46–14	1–2
