= 1990 Big Ten baseball tournament =

1990 Big Ten Conference baseball tournament
- Teams: 4
- Format: Double-elimination
- Finals site: Duane Banks Field; Iowa City, IA
- Champions: Illinois (2nd title)
- Winning coach: Augie Garrido (2nd title)
- MVP: Bob Christensen (Illinois)

1990 Big Ten Conference baseball standings
	Conf.				Overall
Team	W		L	PCT	W		L	PCT
Iowa ‍†‍‍^{y}	22	–	6	.786	38	–	19	.667
No. 23 Illinois ‍‍‡‍^{y}	19	–	9	.679	43	–	21	.672
Minnesota ‍‍‍	19	–	9	.679	36	–	24	.600
Ohio State ‍‍‍	16	–	12	.571	31	–	29	.517
Michigan ‍‍‍	14	–	14	.500	33	–	24	.579
Indiana ‍‍‍	14	–	14	.500	30	–	27	.526
Michigan State ‍‍‍	13	–	15	.464	28	–	24	.538
Purdue ‍‍‍	8	–	19	.296	27	–	31	.466
Wisconsin ‍‍‍	8	–	20	.286	16	–	41	.281
Northwestern ‍‍‍	6	–	21	.222	24	–	32	.429
x – Division champion ‡ – Tournament champion y – Invited to the NCAA tournament As of June 30, 1990; Rankings from Collegiate Baseball

The 1990 Big Ten Conference baseball tournament was held at Duane Banks Field on the campus of the University of Iowa in Iowa City, Iowa from May 15 through 19. The top two teams from the regular season in each division participated in the double-elimination tournament, the tenth annual tournament sponsored by the Big Ten Conference to determine the league champion. Illinois won their second tournament championship and earned the Big Ten Conference's automatic bid to the 1990 NCAA Division I baseball tournament

== Format and seeding ==
The 1990 tournament was a 4-team double-elimination tournament, with seeds determined by conference regular season winning percentage only. Iowa claimed the second seed by tiebreaker over Illinois

Team	W	L	PCT	GB	Seed
Iowa	22	6	.786	–	1
Illinois	19	9	.679	3	2
Minnesota	19	9	.679	3	3
Ohio State	16	12	.571	6	4
Michigan	14	14	.500	8	–
Indiana	14	14	.500	8	–
Michigan State	13	15	.464	9	–
Purdue	8	19	.296	13.5	–
Wisconsin	8	20	.286	14	–
Northwestern	6	21	.222	15.5	–

== Tournament ==
Upper round 1
1	Iowa	6
4	Ohio State	4
2	Illinois	11
3	Minnesota	5
Lower round 1
4	Ohio State	6
3	Minnesota	4

Upper final
1	Iowa	7
2	Illinois	11
Lower final
1	Iowa	5
4	Ohio State	8

Final
2	Illinois	14
4	Ohio State	10

== All-Tournament Team ==
The following players were named to the All-Tournament Team.

Pos	Name	School
P	John DeJarld	Iowa
P	Tim Schwarber	Ohio State
C	Mark Dalesandro	Illinois
1B	Tom Anderson	Iowa
2B	Wil Parsons	Illinois
SS	Bob Christensen	Illinois
3B	Keith Noreen	Iowa
OF	Larry Sutton	Illinois
OF	Chris Hatcher	Iowa
OF	Mike Mulligan	Ohio State
DH	Mike Durant	Ohio State

=== Most Outstanding Player ===
Bob Christensen was named Most Outstanding Player. Christensen was a shortstop for Illinois.
