= Rebhan =

Rebhan (German: from Middle High German rephān "partridge" a metonymic occupational name for a hunter of partridges or a nickname for someone supposedly resembling a partridge in some way) is a surname. Notable people with the name include:

- Mike Rebhan (born 1967), baseball player
- Paul Rebhan, author, musician and artist living in New York City
