= 1990 Trans America Athletic Conference baseball tournament =

American college baseball tournament

- Teams: 4
- Format: Double-elimination
- Finals site: Centenary Park; Shreveport, Louisiana
- Champions: Stetson (3rd title)
- Winning coach: Pete Dunn (3rd title)
- MVP: Todd Greene (Georgia Southern)

1990 Trans America Athletic Conference baseball standings
	Conf.				Overall
Team	W		L	PCT	W		L	PCT
East
No. 8 Georgia Southern ^{x}‍†‍‍^{y}	17	–	1	.944	50	–	19	.725
Stetson ‍‍‡‍^{y}	10	–	8	.556	33	–	31	.516
Samford ‍‍‍	5	–	11	.313	25	–	28	.472
Mercer ‍‍‍	2	–	14	.125	15	–	34	.306
West
Centenary ^{x}‍‍‍	12	–	3	.800	40	–	18	.690
Arkansas–Little Rock ‍‍‍	8	–	7	.533	33	–	20	.623
Hardin–Simmons ‍‍‍	3	–	9	.250	16	–	41	.281
x – Division champion † – Conference champion ‡ – Tournament champion y – Invited to the NCAA tournament As of June 30, 1990; Rankings from Collegiate Baseball

The 1990 Trans America Athletic Conference baseball tournament was held at Centenary Park on the campus of Centenary College of Louisiana in Shreveport, Louisiana. This was the twelfth tournament championship held by the Trans America Athletic Conference, in its twelfth year of existence. Stetson won their third consecutive and overall tournament championship and earned the conference's automatic bid to the 1990 NCAA Division I baseball tournament.

== Format and seeding ==
The top two finishers from each division by conference winning percentage qualified for the tournament, with the top seed from one division playing the second seed from the opposite in the first round.

Team	W	L	Pct.	GB	Seed
East
Georgia Southern	17	1	.944	—	1E
Stetson	10	8	.556	7	2E
Samford	5	11	.313	11	—
Mercer	2	14	.412	14	—

Team	W	L	Pct.	GB	Seed
West
Centenary	12	3	.800	—	1W
Arkansas–Little Rock	8	7	.533	4	2W
Hardin–Simmons	3	9	.250	7.5	—

== Bracket ==
First round
1E	Georgia Southern	6
2W	Arkansas–Little Rock	8
1W	Centenary	10
2E	Stetson	14
Lower round 1
1E	Georgia Southern	14
1W	Centenary	5

Semi-finals
2W	Arkansas–Little Rock	8
2E	Stetson	11
Lower final
2W	Arkansas–Little Rock	4
1E	Georgia Southern	14

Finals
2E	Stetson	2	15
1E	Georgia Southern	5	4

== All-Tournament Team ==
The following players were named to the All-Tournament Team.

POS	Player	School
P	Jim Waring	Stetson
P	Randall Clayton	Arkansas–Little Rock
C	Rick Murray	Stetson
1B	Mike Yuro	Georgia Southern
2B	Mike Ferreira	Stetson
3B	Mike Pinckes	Stetson
SS	Steven Booras	Centenary
OF	Todd Greene	Georgia Southern
OF	Mike Sempeles	Stetson
OF	Wes Sullivan	Arkansas–Little Rock
DH	Rob Fitzpatrick	Georgia Southern

=== Most Valuable Player ===
Todd Greene was named Tournament Most Valuable Player. Greene was an outfielder for Georgia Southern.
