= 1990 Southern Conference baseball tournament =

- Teams: 7
- Format: Double-elimination tournament
- Finals site: College Park (Charleston); Charleston, South Carolina
- Champions: The Citadel (1st title)
- Winning coach: Chal Port (1st title)

The 1990 Southern Conference baseball tournament was held at College Park in Charleston, South Carolina, from April 26 through 29. Top seeded The Citadel won the tournament and earned the Southern Conference's automatic bid to the 1990 NCAA Division I baseball tournament en route to their appearance in the 1990 College World Series. It was the Bulldogs first tournament win.

The tournament used a double-elimination format. All seven teams participated, with the top seed receiving a single bye.

The 1990 event was the first of nineteen consecutive SoCon tournaments held in Charleston; first at College Park, then at Joseph P. Riley Jr. Park beginning with that stadium's opening in 1997.

== Seeding ==
Team	W	L	Pct	GB	Seed
The Citadel	13	1	.929	–	1
Western Carolina	10	7	.588	4.5	2
Marshall	10	7	.588	4.5	3
VMI	6	8	.429	7	4
Appalachian State	6	9	.400	7.5	5
Furman	6	11	.353	8.5	6
East Tennessee State	4	12	.250	10	7

== Results ==
=== Game results ===
Date	Game	Winner	Score	Loser	Notes
April 26	1	Western Carolina	6–1	East Tennessee State	
April 26	2	Marshall	5–2	Furman	
April 26	3	Appalachian State	9–2	VMI	
April 27	4	Furman	10–9^{10}	VMI	VMI eliminated
April 27	5	Marshall	3–1	Western Carolina	
April 27	6	The Citadel	7–2	Appalachian State	
April 27	7	East Tennessee State	5–2	Furman	Furman eliminated
April 28	8	Western Carolina	5–4	Appalachian State	
April 28	9	The Citadel	9–2	Marshall	
April 28	10	Western Carolina	11–3	Marshall	Marshall eliminated
April 28	11	The Citadel	6–0	East Tennessee State	East Tennessee State eliminated
April 29	12	Western Carolina	5–4	Appalachian State	Appalachian State eliminated
April 29	13	The Citadel	9–5	Western Carolina	The Citadel wins SoCon Tournament

== All-Tournament Team ==
The 1990 event was the first at which an All-Tournament team was named.

Position	Player	School
P	Richard Shirer	The Citadel
C	Gettys Glaze	The Citadel
1B	Brad Niethammer	Appalachian State
2B	Grant Brittain	Western Carolina
3B	Doug Jones	Appalachian State
SS	Dave Piepenbrink	Marshall
OF	Billy Baker	The Citadel
OF	Chris Stone	Furman
OF	Rodney Tesh	Western Carolina
DH	Mike Hilton	Western Carolina

Walt Nadzak Award, Tournament Most Outstanding Player
Billy Baker
The Citadel
