= 1990 Cal State Fullerton Titans baseball team =

American college baseball season

1990 Cal State Fullerton Titans baseball

NCAA Central Regional champions Big West Conference champions

College World Series, 0–2
- Conference: Big West Conference
- Record: 36–23 (13–5 Big West)
- Head coach: Larry Cochell (3rd year)
- Home stadium: Titan Field

1990 Big West Conference baseball standings
	Conf.				Overall
Team	W		L	PCT	W		L	PCT
No. 7 Cal State Fullerton ‍†‍‍^{y}	13	–	5	.722	36	–	23	.610
No. 28 Fresno State ‍‍‍^{y}	13	–	8	.619	38	–	24	.613
UC Santa Barbara ‍‍‍^{y}	13	–	8	.619	40	–	22	.645
Long Beach State ‍‍‍	12	–	9	.571	36	–	22	.621
UNLV ‍‍‍	10	–	11	.476	29	–	24	.547
UC Irvine ‍‍‍	10	–	11	.476	34	–	25	.576
San Jose State ‍‍‍	9	–	12	.429	43	–	17	.717
Pacific ‍‍‍	1	–	17	.056	14	–	40	.259
† – Conference champion y – Invited to the NCAA tournament As of June 30, 1990; Rankings from Collegiate Baseball

The 1990 Cal State Fullerton Titans baseball team represented California State University, Fullerton in the 1990 NCAA Division I baseball season. The Titans played their home games at Titan Field, and played as part of the Big West Conference. The team was coached by Larry Cochell in his third season as head coach at Cal State Fullerton.

The Titans reached the College World Series, their sixth appearance in Omaha, where they finished tied for seventh place after losing games to eventual runner-up Oklahoma State and The Citadel.

== Personnel ==
=== Roster ===
1990 Cal State Fullerton Titans roster
Pitchers: 9 - Rich Faulks - Junior; 12 - Tony Fetchel - Freshman; 18 - James Popoff - Sophomore; 19 - Jeff Hawkins - Freshman; 20 - Doug Ketchen - Junior; 22 - Chris Robinson - Junior; 25 - Huck Flener - Junior; 27 - Sam Colarusso - Senior; 30 - Tim Spencer - Sophomore; 31 - Bill Fitzgerald - Freshman; 32 - Jack Bailey - Junior; 33 - Scott Sachrison - Junior; 34 - Matt Watson - Junior	Catchers: 8 - John Mele - Junior; 24 - Frank Charles - Junior; 26 - Eddie Lample - Sophomore; 39 - Matt Hattabaugh - Junior; Outfielders: 2 - David Ayala - Sophomore; 5 - Domingo Mota - Junior; 7 - Matt McElreath - Freshman; 10 - Rich Gonzales - Senior; 13 - Tom Manley - Junior; 35 - Paul Bunch - Senior	Infielders: 3 - Mark Shimamoto - Junior; 4 - Mate´ Borgogno - Junior; 6 - Steve Sisco - Junior; 15 - Bobby Kopenhaver - Sophomore; 17 - Kevin Farlow - Junior; 21 - Phil Nevin - Freshman; 28 - Trevor Rush - Freshman; 36 - Jeff Higbee - Senior

=== Coaches ===
1990 Cal State Fullerton Titans baseball coaching staff
- 1 - Larry Cochell - Head coach - 3rd Season
- 23 - Shane Flores - Assistant coach - 1st Season
- 41 - Vern Ruhle - Assistant coach - 1st Season
- 43 - Fred Hoover - Assistant coach - 2nd Season

== Schedule and results ==
Legend
Cal State Fullerton win
Cal State Fullerton loss

1990 Cal State Fullerton Titans baseball game log
Regular season

January/February
Date	Opponent	Site/Stadium	Score	Overall Record	Big West Record
Jan 30	Cal Poly Pomona*	Titan Field • Fullerton, CA	W 6–1	1–0	
Feb 2	at No. 4 Stanford*	Sunken Diamond • Stanford, CA	L 1–8	1–1	
Feb 3	at No. 4 Stanford*	Sunken Diamond • Stanford, CA	L 0–1	1–2	
Feb 4	at No. 4 Stanford*	Sunken Diamond • Stanford, CA	L 7–8	1–3	
Feb 8	at No. 22 Arizona*	Sancet Stadium • Tucson, AZ	W 10–3	2–3	
Feb 9	at No. 22 Arizona*	Sancet Stadium • Tucson, AZ	W 6–1	3–3	
Feb 10	at No. 22 Arizona*	Sancet Stadium • Tucson, AZ	L 8–9	3–4	
Feb 13	US International*	Titan Field • Fullerton, CA	W 10–3	4–4	
Feb 14	No. 23 Pepperdine*	Titan Field • Fullerton, CA	W 13–3	5–4	
Feb 16	Rice*	Titan Field • Fullerton, CA	W 7–1	6–4	
Feb 20	at No. 14 Loyola Marymount*	George C. Page Stadium • Los Angeles, CA	L 10–12	6–5	
Feb 23	US International*	Titan Field • Fullerton, CA	W 12–3	7–5	
Feb 24	at US International*	San Diego, CA	W 10–5	8–5	

March
Date	Opponent	Site/Stadium	Score	Overall Record	Big West Record
Mar 6	at No. 14 UCLA*	Jackie Robinson Stadium • Los Angeles, CA	L 4–12	8–6	
Mar 9	at US International*	San Diego, CA	L 2–3^{10}	8–7	
Mar 11	No. 15 Loyola Marymount*	Titan Field • Fullerton, CA	W 9–8^{10}	9–7	
Mar 13	Wyoming*	Titan Field • Fullerton, CA	L 7–8	9–8	
Mar 14	at UC Riverside*	Riverside Sports Complex • Riverside, CA	L 4–5	9–9	
Mar 16	US International*	Titan Field • Fullerton, CA	W 11–2	10–9	
Mar 17	Wisconsin*	Titan Field • Fullerton, CA	W 7–2	11–9	
Mar 18	Wisconsin*	Titan Field • Fullerton, CA	W 4–0	12–9	
Mar 19	Wisconsin*	Titan Field • Fullerton, CA	W 16–1	13–9	
Mar 22	No. 11 Illinois*	Titan Field • Fullerton, CA	L 4–10	13–10	
Mar 23	California*	Titan Field • Fullerton, CA	W 5–4^{10}	14–10	
Mar 24	California*	Titan Field • Fullerton, CA	L 9–13	14–11	
Mar 25	California*	Titan Field • Fullerton, CA	L 2–6	14–12	
Mar 27	San Diego*	Titan Field • Fullerton, CA	W 9–4	15–12	
Mar 30	UC Irvine	Titan Field • Fullerton, CA	L 0–4	15–13	0–1
Mar 31	UC Irvine	Titan Field • Fullerton, CA	W 4–2	16–13	1–1

April
Date	Opponent	Site/Stadium	Score	Overall Record	Big West Record
Apr 1	UC Irvine	Titan Field • Fullerton, CA	W 6–1	17–13	2–1
Apr 3	at Chapman*	Orange, CA	L 1–4	17–14	
Apr 5	Cal State Los Angeles*	Titan Field • Fullerton, CA	W 9–6	18–14	
Apr 6	at Pepperdine*	Eddy D. Field Stadium • Malibu, CA	L 1–6	18–15	
Apr 10	No. 4 USC*	Titan Field • Fullerton, CA	L 5–6	18–16	
Apr 12	No. 18 Fresno State	Titan Field • Fullerton, CA	W 6–3	19–16	3–1
Apr 13	No. 18 Fresno State	Titan Field • Fullerton, CA	W 5–2	20–16	4–1
Apr 14	No. 18 Fresno State	Titan Field • Fullerton, CA	W 15–4	21–16	5–1
Apr 17	Chapman*	Titan Field • Fullerton, CA	W 4–3	22–16	
Apr 20	No. 20 UNLV	Titan Field • Fullerton, CA	W 9–2	23–16	6–1
Apr 21	No. 20 UNLV	Titan Field • Fullerton, CA	W 5–1	24–16	7–1
Apr 22	No. 20 UNLV	Titan Field • Fullerton, CA	W 6–1	25–16	8–1
Apr 24	at No. 6 USC*	Dedeaux Field • Los Angeles, CA	L 4–5	25–17	
Apr 27	at Long Beach State	Blair Field • Long Beach, CA	L 3–4	25–18	8–2
Apr 28	at Long Beach State	Blair Field • Long Beach, CA	L 6–9	25–19	8–3
Apr 29	at Long Beach State	Blair Field • Long Beach, CA	W 5–1	26–19	9–3

May
Date	Opponent	Site/Stadium	Score	Overall Record	Big West Record
May 2	at US International*	San Diego, CA	W 8–2	27–19	
May 4	UC Santa Barbara	Titan Field • Fullerton, CA	W 5–4	28–19	10–3
May 5	UC Santa Barbara	Titan Field • Fullerton, CA	L 13–14	28–20	10–4
May 6	UC Santa Barbara	Titan Field • Fullerton, CA	W 15–4	29–20	11–4
May 8	No. 17 UCLA*	Titan Field • Fullerton, CA	W 10–9	30–20	
May 11	at San Jose State	San Jose Municipal Stadium • San Jose, CA	W 10–3	31–20	12–4
May 12	at San Jose State	San Jose Municipal Stadium • San Jose, CA	W 11–5	32–20	13–4
May 13	at San Jose State	San Jose Municipal Stadium • San Jose, CA	L 5–11	32–21	13–5

Postseason

NCAA Central Regional
Date	Opponent	Seed	Site/Stadium	Score	Overall Record	Reg Record
May 25	(4) Old Dominion	(3)	Disch–Falk Field • Austin, TX	W 16–3	33–21	1–0
May 26	No. 23 (5) Creighton	(3)	Disch–Falk Field • Austin, TX	W 6–3	34–21	2–0
May 27	No. 5 (1) Texas	(3)	Disch–Falk Field • Austin, TX	W 5–2	35–21	3–0
May 28	No. 5 (1) Texas	(3)	Disch–Falk Field • Austin, TX	W 3–0	36–21	4–0

College World Series
Date	Opponent	Seed	Site/Stadium	Score	Overall Record	CWS Record
June 2	No. 3 (3) Oklahoma State	(6)	Johnny Rosenblatt Stadium • Omaha, NE	L 4–14	36–22	0–1
June 4	No. 20 (7) The Citadel	(6)	Johnny Rosenblatt Stadium • Omaha, NE	L 7–8^{12}	36–23	0–2
