= Steve Webber =

American baseball coach (1947–2022)

Biographical details
- Born: November 21, 1947; Fairfield, Iowa, U.S.
- Died: November 12, 2022 (aged 74); Atlanta, Georgia, U.S.
- Education: Southern Illinois University

Coaching career (HC unless noted)
- 1981–1996: Georgia

Head coaching record
- Overall: 500–403–1

Accomplishments and honors

Championships
- 1990 College World Series

Stephen Cecil Webber (November 21, 1947 – November 12, 2022) was an American baseball player and coach. Born in Fairfield, Iowa, and raised in nearby Stockport, Webber played college baseball at Southern Illinois University and participated in the 1969 College World Series. He was head coach at the University of Georgia from 1981 to 1996, leading the team to a national title in 1990. His 1990 team was the first time a member of the Southeastern Conference won the College World Series. In 1996, he resigned from the Bulldogs; his 500 wins as manager remain a program record. He later served as an assistant coach for several minor league teams. In 2018, he was inducted into the University of Georgia Circle of Honor.

Webber holds many marks of distinction in Iowa High School Baseball. On June 13, 1966, he struck out 23 batters for Van Buren High School in a seven-inning game against WACO High School. In that season, he struck out 222 batters (9th best in Iowa High School Baseball history) and pitched for an ERA of 0.51 in 95 innings (tied for 18th all time in Iowa).

Webber died at his home in Atlanta, Georgia, on November 12, 2022, at the age of 74.

== Coaching positions ==
- 1974–1975 – Georgia Southern University (pitching coach)
- 1976–1980 – University of Florida (pitching coach)
- 1981–1996 – University of Georgia (head coach)
- 1997–1998 – Oneonta Yankees (pitching coach/area scout)
- 1999 – Greensboro Bats (pitching coach)
- 2000–2002 – GCL Yankees (pitching coach)
- 2000–2003 – New York Yankees (coordinator of instruction)
- 2004–2005 – Fort Wayne Wizards (pitching coach)
- 2006–2007 – Lake Elsinore Storm (pitching coach)
- 2007–2009 – San Antonio Missions (pitching coach)
- 2010 – Portland Beavers (pitching coach)
- 2011–2012 – Tucson Padres (pitching coach)
- 2013–2014 – Oklahoma City RedHawks (pitching coach)
- 2016 – Atlanta Braves (pitching consultant)
