= Danny Perez =

American baseball player (born 1971)

- Outfielder
- Born: February 25, 1971 (age 55); El Paso, Texas, U.S.
- Batted: Right Threw: Right

MLB debut
- June 28, 1996, for the Milwaukee Brewers

Last MLB appearance
- July 7, 1996, for the Milwaukee Brewers

MLB statistics
- Games played: 4
- Plate appearances: 2
- Stats at Baseball Reference

Teams
- Milwaukee Brewers (1996)

Danny Perez (born February 25, 1971) is an American former Major League Baseball outfielder. Perez was drafted by the Milwaukee Brewers in the twenty-first round of the 1992 Major League Baseball draft. He played at the Major League level with the team in 1996.

Perez played at the collegiate level at Oklahoma State University.
