= Stan Spencer =

American baseball player

- Pitcher
- Born: August 7, 1969 (age 56); Vancouver, Washington, U.S.
- Batted: Right Threw: Right

MLB debut
- August 27, 1998, for the San Diego Padres

Last MLB appearance
- June 19, 2000, for the San Diego Padres

MLB statistics
- Win–loss record: 3–9
- Earned run average: 5.54
- Strikeouts: 107
- Stats at Baseball Reference

Teams
- San Diego Padres (1998–2000)

Stanley Roger Spencer (born August 7, 1969) is an American former Major League Baseball pitcher for the San Diego Padres.

Spencer was drafted by the Boston Red Sox in 1987 in the 26th round, 681st overall, and then again by the Montreal Expos with the 35th pick in the first round of the 1990 draft. After playing 151 minor league games, he made his major league debut on August 27, 1998. He only played in 23 games in the majors. He played a total of 3 seasons going 3-9 with an earned run average of 5.54 and 107 strikeouts.

Graduate of Columbia River High School, Vancouver, Washington (1987).
