= Jeffrey Hammonds =

American baseball player (born 1971)

- Outfielder
- Born: March 5, 1971 (age 55); Plainfield, New Jersey, U.S.
- Batted: Right Threw: Right

MLB debut
- June 25, 1993, for the Baltimore Orioles

Last MLB appearance
- May 22, 2005, for the Washington Nationals

MLB statistics
- Batting average: .272
- Home runs: 110
- Runs batted in: 423
- Stats at Baseball Reference

Teams
- Baltimore Orioles (1993–1998); Cincinnati Reds (1998–1999); Colorado Rockies (2000); Milwaukee Brewers (2001–2003); San Francisco Giants (2003–2004); Washington Nationals (2005)

Career highlights and awards
- All-Star (2000)
Medals
Men's baseball
Representing United States
Pan American Games
Bronze medal – third place	1991 Havana	Team

Jeffrey Bryan Hammonds (born March 5, 1971) is an American former professional baseball player. Hammonds was an outfielder and played for the Baltimore Orioles (1993–1998), Cincinnati Reds (1998–1999), Colorado Rockies (2000), Milwaukee Brewers (2001–2003), San Francisco Giants (2003–2004) and the Washington Nationals (2005) in Major League Baseball (MLB). Before playing professionally, Hammonds played for Scotch Plains-Fanwood High School in Scotch Plains, New Jersey and Stanford University.

At Stanford, Hammonds was named an All-American. The Orioles selected Hammonds with the fourth overall selection of the 1992 MLB draft. Though he was seen as one of the best prospects in baseball, injuries limited his performance with Baltimore. After he was traded to Cincinnati and then to Colorado, he emerged with the Rockies in 2000, and was selected to appear at the 2000 Major League Baseball All-Star Game. He signed a three-year, $21.75 million contract with the Milwaukee Brewers that off-season, but continued to struggle with injuries. He had a resurgence with the Giants in 2003, after he was released by the Brewers, but struggled with the Giants in 2004 and Nationals in 2005 before retiring.

== Amateur career ==
Born in Plainfield, New Jersey, Hammonds grew up in Scotch Plains, New Jersey, He attended Scotch Plains-Fanwood High School, where he played for the school's baseball team. After high school, Hammonds was a ninth-round draft pick of the Toronto Blue Jays in the 1989 Major League Baseball draft, though he did not sign. He reported that he never considered going professional at that point, as his parents insisted he attend college, and that Hammonds' brother, who had signed with the Pittsburgh Pirates out of high school, suffered a career-ending injury while playing in minor league baseball.

Hammonds had scholarship offers to attend Duke University, the University of Notre Dame, and Stanford University and play college baseball. He chose to attend Stanford University, where he played for the Stanford Cardinal baseball team that competed in the Pacific-10 Conference (Pac-10) in the National Collegiate Athletic Association's (NCAA) Division I. At Stanford, Hammonds broke the Pac-10 single season stolen base record as a freshman, stealing 102 bases in 174 career games. Hammonds was awarded NCAA Freshman of the Year and voted All-College World Series in 1990 and was also named an All-American in that year.

During the 1992 season, Hammonds batted .380 with 33 stolen bases in 47 games, and was again named an All-American. He again led the Cardinal to the 1992 College World Series.

== Professional career ==
=== Draft ===
Before the 1992 Major League Baseball draft, Hammonds indicated that he would sign if offered a $1.8 million signing bonus, which caused Hammonds to fall to the fourth overall selection, where the Baltimore Orioles selected Hammonds with their first-round draft pick. Frank Robinson, then the Orioles' assistant general manager (GM), met Hammonds at that year's College World Series while scouting, and advised Orioles GM Doug Melvin to pick Hammonds. The Orioles, regarded as frugal, held a hard line with Hammonds in negotiations, refusing to give a signing bonus as large as $1 million.

Hammonds did not play professionally in 1992 as he competed for the United States national baseball team in the 1992 Summer Olympics in Barcelona. He faced a two-month road trip across sixteen states by bus, more travel combined with training than employed by any professional team. Hammonds struggled with the national team initially, but agreed to sign with the Orioles in July 1992, receiving a $975,000 signing bonus, the largest of any player chosen in that draft. Upon signing, his hitting improved.

=== Top prospect: Baltimore Orioles (1992–1996) ===
Without having played a single professional game, Baseball America rated Hammonds as the 19th best prospect in baseball. He made his professional debut in 1993 with the Bowie Baysox of the Class-AA Eastern League, where he batted .283, at which point he was promoted to the Rochester Red Wings of the Class-AAA International League, where he batted .311. Hammonds received a promotion to the Orioles on June 25, becoming the first player chosen in the 1992 MLB draft to reach the majors, where his debut was greeted with fanfare and high expectations. He batted .305 in 105 at-bats with the Orioles that season, however he suffered a pinched nerve in May, and a neck injury in August. The Orioles ended his season prematurely to allow Hammonds to recover. Hammonds was reunited on the 1993 Orioles with former Stanford teammates Mike Mussina and Paul Carey.

Thought of as a potential candidate for the American League Rookie of the Year Award, at this point Baseball America rated Hammonds the third best prospect in all of baseball. Hammonds suffered a knee injury during the 1994 season but opted to continue playing despite being told he needed reconstructive knee surgery, with his subsequent performances limited as a result. When the Orioles needed to reduce their roster from 28 players to 25 in May 1995, Hammonds, who started the season batting 4-for-19, was optioned back to Bowie.

After struggling with the Orioles early in the 1996 season, batting .237 in 56 games, he was demoted back to Rochester in June. The Orioles included Hammonds in numerous trade proposals that summer, but eventually held on to him. During his spell with Rochester Hammonds became more selective in his approach at the plate, and was recalled to the Orioles. Hammonds injured his knee in August and though he returned to the Orioles in September, they left him off their postseason roster, as they asserted that they felt Hammonds was rusty. Hammonds believed that the snub meant he should be traded, but stopped short of demanding a trade.

=== Searching for success: Baltimore Orioles and Cincinnati Reds (1997–1999) ===
Formerly considered a top prospect in the Orioles organization, Hammonds returned to them in 1997 with his role in the organization unclear. In past spring trainings Hammonds had always practiced with the starters; in 1997, the Orioles alternated him between the starters, who practiced in the stadium, and the minor leaguers and non-roster players, who practiced in fields behind the stadium near an airport runway. New GM Pat Gillick didn't deny that the Orioles could trade him if Hammonds didn't maximize his talent, though he called a potential trade a "last resort". Despite this Hammonds had a successful season, playing in 118 games that season, receiving 397 at-bats. He scored 71 runs, had 105 hits, including 19 doubles, three triples, and 21 home runs, and recorded 55 RBI.

By 1998, Hammonds and the Orioles were hoping he would achieve more consistency. With the threat of facing a salary arbitration hearing, the Orioles approached him with the idea of working out an agreement on a multi-year contract extension. Hammonds agreed, and signed a three-year, $7 million contract before the 1998 season. Hammonds felt that this was a strong commitment from the Orioles hierarchy, including Gillick, after which manager Ray Miller believed that this would allow Hammonds to focus on improving his skills. However, Hammonds suffered a back injury that returned him to the disabled list that year.

When Hammonds recovered, the Orioles traded him to the Cincinnati Reds for Willie Greene in August 1998. Hammonds originally was designated to serve as a backup outfielder for the Reds going into the 1999. In the May 19 contest versus the Colorado Rockies, Cincinnati won by a score of 24−12, tied for the fourth-highest run-scoring output in MLB history. Hammonds hit three home runs in this game; the Reds totaled six. He batted .279 with 17 home runs and 41 RBIs in 123 games during the 1999 season. After the season, the Reds traded Hammonds with Stan Belinda to the Colorado Rockies for Dante Bichette and $1.9 million to make up for the differences in salaries, as the Reds believed the slugging Bichette could aid them in replacing Greg Vaughn.

=== All-Star season and multiyear contract: Colorado Rockies, Milwaukee Brewers (2000–2003) ===
In 2000 with the Colorado Rockies, Hammonds batted .335 with 20 home runs, 106 RBI, 14 stolen bases, in only 454 at bats. For his performance, he earned a spot on the 2000 National League All-Star team roster. He trailed only teammate Todd Helton in batting average for the majority of the season, eventually finishing with the fourth-highest batting average in the league, behind Helton, Moisés Alou, and Vladimir Guerrero.

After the season, the Rockies declined to offer Hammonds salary arbitration, making him a free agent. Due to concerns about Hammonds' injury history, including 40 games missed due to injury in the 2000 season, the Rockies chose not to meet Hammonds' financial demands. Before the 2001 season, the Milwaukee Brewers signed Hammonds to a three-year, $21.75 million contract, the largest contract the organization had approved to that date. However, injuries prevented Hammonds from approaching the All-Star form he had shown with the Rockies. He suffered a shoulder injury in 2001 which required surgery and this limited him to 49 games played for the season. He returned with a hot start in the 2002 season, batting .324 as of June 5, but he had a recurrence of the shoulder injury later in the season that returned him to the disabled list yet again. Hammonds then began the 2003 season on the disabled list, this time with a high ankle sprain.

=== Struggles, resurgence, and injuries: San Francisco Giants and Washington Nationals (2003–2005) ===
The Brewers released Hammonds on June 4, 2003, after he struggled in ten games, batting .158. He signed with the San Francisco Giants at the end of June. They initially assigned him to the Class-AAA Fresno Grizzlies of the Pacific Coast League, before promoting him on July 30. He batted .277 with three home runs and 10 RBIs in 36 games during the second half of the 2003 season, and was selected for the Giants' postseason roster over Marvin Benard and Eric Young where he batted 2-for-4 in Game 4 of the 2003 National League Division Series. Granted free agency at the end of the season, he re-signed with the Giants for the 2004 season for $1 million, as the replacement for Jose Cruz Jr., who had left after becoming a free agent. However, Hammonds was unable to sustain his improved performance and the Giants released Hammonds that June, after he batted .211 with three home runs and six RBIs.

Hammonds then signed with the Washington Nationals organization on a minor league contract. He started the 2005 season with the New Orleans Zephyrs of the PCL, but was recalled to the Nationals on May 3. He batted .219 with one RBI in thirteen games for the Nationals, before returning to the disabled list with an injured hamstring on May 22. While rehabilitating the injury, Hammonds decided to retire rather than return to the minor leagues.

Though Hammonds had great natural talent, his injuries limited his career. Hammonds announced his retirement on June 10, 2005. In his thirteen-year career in MLB, he batted .272, 110 home runs, 824 hits, and 423 RBIs.

== Personal life ==
Hammonds lives in Weston, Florida with his three children. As of 2012, he was employed as a scout for the San Diego Padres. He has interest in digital media, aiding baseball prospects, and working for the Major League Baseball Players Association. On February 6, 2014, Hammonds was hired by the players' union as special assistant for player program development.

Hammonds' older brother, Reginald, played minor league baseball for the Pittsburgh Pirates' organization, reaching Class-AAA before suffering a career-ending injury. He enrolled at Northwestern University, graduated, became a stockbroker and aided Hammonds in his 1992 contract negotiations.

== See also ==
- 1992 College Baseball All-America Team
