= Campbell Fighting Camels baseball =

Baseball team representing Campbell University

- 2026 Campbell Fighting Camels baseball team
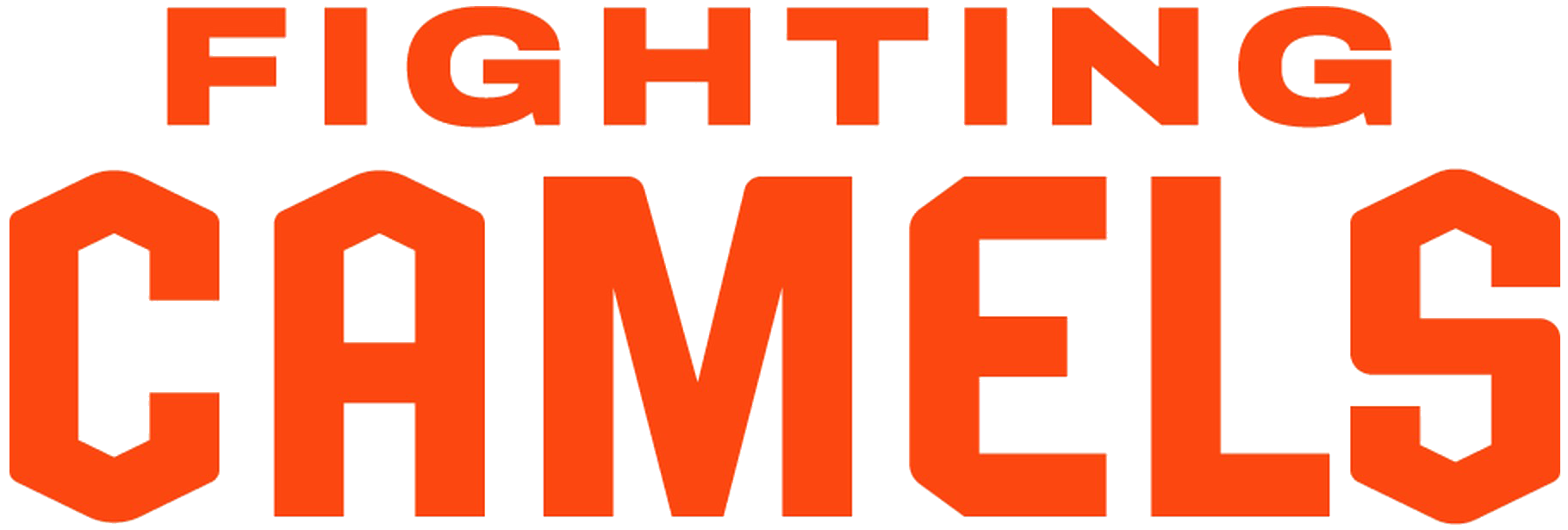
- Founded: 1963; 63 years ago
- University: Campbell University
- Head coach: Chris Marx (2nd season)
- Conference: Coastal Athletic Association
- Location: Buies Creek, North Carolina
- Home stadium: Jim Perry Stadium (capacity: 1250)
- Nickname: Fighting Camels
- Colors: Black and orange

NCAA tournament appearances
- 1990, 2014*, 2018, 2019, 2021, 2022, 2023

Conference tournament champions
- 1988, 1990, 2014*, 2018, 2019, 2022, 2023

Conference regular season champions
- 2013, 2018, 2019, 2021, 2022, 2023, 2026 *vacated by NCAA

The Campbell Fighting Camels baseball team is Campbell University's NCAA Division I baseball team. The team plays its home games on campus at Jim Perry Stadium, named for former Campbell Baseball and Basketball player Jim Perry. Prior to 2012, the venue was known as Taylor Field. The team currently competes as members of the Coastal Athletic Association which they joined in the 2024 season. Previously, the Fighting Camels competed in the Big South Conference from 1983 until 1994 before moving to the Atlantic Sun Conference. They returned to the Big South in 2011 but once again left in the 2023-2024 sports season. Notable alumni include Jim Perry, Ryan Thompson, Cedric Mullins, and Zach Neto.

== 1990 season ==
The 1990 edition of the Fighting Camels went 11–31 but swept the Big South Conference tournament with a 4–0 record to earn the Fighting Camels' first appearance in the 1990 NCAA Division I baseball tournament. However, success was short-lived as the Camels lost 7–0 to Stanford University and 8–7 to Southern Illinois University at the Palo Alto Regional.

== 2014 season ==
The 2014 Fighting Camels won the Big South tournament championship and earned a spot in the Columbia Regional of the 2014 NCAA Division I baseball tournament. During the regular season the Camels went 40–19, 18–8 in conference. They lost to host team South Carolina 5–2 in their first game. They then defeated the ODU Monarchs in the elimination game 4–1 in 12 innings for their first NCAA tournament victory. In their next game they were eliminated by South Carolina 9–0. After their regional run Campbell coach Greg Goff left for Louisiana Tech.

== 2018 season ==
The 2018 Fighting Camels won the Big South tournament championship at Liberty University and earned a spot in the Athens Regional of the 2018 NCAA Division I baseball tournament. During the regular season the Camels went 35–24, 21–6 in conference. They lost to the host team Georgia Bulldogs 18–5 in their first game. They then lost to the Duke Blue Devils in the elimination game 16–8.

== 2019 season ==
The 2019 Fighting Camels won both the Big South Conference regular season championship and the Big South Conference baseball tournament at Segra Stadium in Fayetteville, NC which earned them a spot in the Greenville Regional of the 2019 NCAA Division I baseball tournament. They defeated local rival North Carolina State 5–4 in game 1 of the regional. In the winners' bracket, Game 2, they beat Quinnipiac 9–8 in walk-off fashion. They then lost to the East Carolina in the regional finals: 10–2 in game 1 and 12–3 in game 2. During the regular season the Fighting Camels went 32–19, 19–7 in conference and had a final overall record of 37–21. Following the 2019 season, four players were drafted in the 2019 MLB First Year Player Draft with right handed pitcher Seth Johnson being the first Camel to be selected as a first-round pick.

== Fighting Camels in the NCAA tournament ==
The Fighting Camels have made six NCAA tournament appearances. The Camels received their first ever at-large bid in the 2021 campaign, being the first Campbell University athletics team to do so.

Season	Regional	Record	Results
1990	Palo Alto	0–2 (.000)	Eliminated by Southern Illinois
2014	Columbia	1–2 (.333)	Eliminated by South Carolina
2018	Athens	0–2 (.000)	Eliminated by Duke
2019	Greenville	2–2 (.500)	Eliminated by East Carolina
2021	Starkville	2–2 (.500)	Eliminated by Mississippi St
2022	Knoxville	1–2 (.333)	Eliminated by Georgia Tech
2023	Columbia	2–2 (.500)	Eliminated by South Carolina
Tournament Record: 8–14 (.364)			Total NCAA tournament Appearances: 7

== See also ==
- List of NCAA Division I baseball programs
