= Mike Rebhan =

American baseball player (1967–2019)

- Pitcher
- Born: September 28, 1967; Rockville, Maryland, U.S.
- Died: February 27, 2019 (aged 51); Vero Beach, Florida, U.S.
- Batted: Right Threw: Right

Michael H. Rebhan (September 28, 1967 – February 27, 2019) was an American college baseball player for the Georgia Bulldogs baseball team.

== Early life ==
In 1990, Rebhan led the Bulldogs to the 1990 College World Series championship and earned the honor of College World Series Most Outstanding Player.

Prior to playing collegiate baseball, he attended Mainland High School and Osceola High School. He also attended Lake City Community College.

Although he was drafted by the Boston Red Sox in the 32nd round of the 1988 amateur draft, he never played professionally. Following his playing career, he graduated from the University of Georgia with a Bachelor of Science in Computer Science in June 1991.

== Personal ==
Rebhan became a software engineer after his graduation as he had decided not to pursue a baseball career. He died on February 27, 2019, at the age of 51.
