= 1990 NCAA Division I baseball rankings =

1990 NCAA Division I baseball season

Tournament

College World Series
- Champions: Georgia
- Runners-up: Oklahoma State
- MOP: Mike Rebhan (Georgia)

Seasons
- ← 1989 1991 →

The following polls make up the 1990 NCAA Division I baseball rankings. Baseball America began publishing its poll of the top 20 teams in college baseball in 1981. Beginning with the 1985 season, it expanded to the top 25. Collegiate Baseball Newspaper published its first human poll of the top 20 teams in college baseball in 1957, and expanded to rank the top 30 teams in 1961.

== Baseball America ==
Currently, only the final poll from the 1990 season is available.

Rank	Team
1	Georgia
2	Oklahoma State
3	Stanford
4	LSU
5	Arizona State
6	Southern California
7	Mississippi State
8	Florida State
9	Cal State Fullerton
10	Texas
11	Georgia Southern
12	Arkansas
13	Miami (FL)
14	Southern Illinois
15	North Carolina
16	Illinois
17	San Diego State
18	Washington State
19	Wichita State
20	The Citadel
21	Houston
22	Loyola Marymount
23	South Alabama
24	UCLA
25	Creighton

== Collegiate Baseball ==
Currently, only the final poll from the 1990 season is available.

Rank	Team
1	Georgia
2	Oklahoma State
3	Stanford
4	LSU
5	Mississippi State
6	The Citadel
7	Cal State Fullerton
8	Georgia Southern
9	Arizona State
10	Florida State
11	Southern California
12	Miami (FL)
13	Texas
14	Arkansas
15	San Diego State
16	Southern Illinois
17	South Alabama
18	Washington State
19	UCLA
20	Wichita State
21	North Carolina
22	Creighton
23	Illinois
24	Houston
25	Loyola Marymount
26	NC State
27	Maine
28	Fresno State
29	BYU
30	Clemson
