= 1990 NCAA Division I baseball tournament =

American college sports championship

- Season: 1990
- Teams: 48
- Finals site: Johnny Rosenblatt Stadium; Omaha, NE
- Champions: Georgia (1st title)
- Runner-up: Oklahoma State (16th CWS Appearance)
- Winning coach: Steve Webber (1st title)
- MOP: Mike Rebhan (Georgia)

The 1990 NCAA Division I baseball tournament was played at the end of the 1990 NCAA Division I baseball season to determine the national champion of college baseball. The tournament concluded with eight teams competing in the College World Series, a double-elimination tournament in its forty fourth year. Eight regional competitions were held to determine the participants in the final event. Each region was composed of six teams, resulting in 48 teams participating in the tournament at the conclusion of their regular season, and in some cases, after a conference tournament. The forty-fourth tournament's champion was Georgia, coached by Steve Webber. The Most Outstanding Player was Mike Rebhan of Georgia.

== Regionals ==
The opening rounds of the tournament were played across eight regional sites across the country, each consisting of a six-team field. Each regional tournament is double-elimination. The winners of each regional advanced to the College World Series.

Bold indicates winner.

=== Northeast Regional ===
At Waterbury, CT

First round
6	Rutgers	2
**1**	**North Carolina**	**3**
5	Connecticut	2
**2**	**Georgia**	**7**
**4**	**Maine**	**4**
3	Iowa	3

Second round
**1**	**North Carolina**	**5**
3	Iowa	3
**2**	**Georgia**	**6**
4	Maine	3
5	Connecticut	5
**6**	**Rutgers**	**15**

Third round
1	North Carolina	4
**2**	**Georgia**	**5**
4	Maine	4
**6**	**Rutgers**	**5**

Semifinals
**6**	**Rutgers**	**9**
1	North Carolina	7

Final
**2**	**Georgia**	3	**20**
6	Rutgers	**4**	9

=== Atlantic Regional ===
At Coral Gables, FL

First round
6	Stetson	3
**1**	**Miami**	**4**
**5**	**The Citadel**	**11**
2	NC State	3
4	South Florida	2
**3**	**East Carolina**	**4**

Second round
**1**	**Miami**	**5**
4	South Florida	2
3	East Carolina	5
**5**	**The Citadel**	**8**
**2**	**NC State**	**13**
6	Stetson	2

Third round
**5**	**The Citadel**	**6**
1	Miami	2
**2**	**NC State**	**8**
3	East Carolina	1

Semifinals
**1**	**Miami**	**6**
2	NC State	1

Final
1	Miami	1	—
**5**	**The Citadel**	**4**	—

=== South I Regional ===
At Baton Rouge, LA

First round
6	Southwestern Louisiana	0
**1**	**LSU**	**8**
5	Southern Miss	5
**2**	**USC**	**23**
4	Georgia Tech	2
**3**	**Houston**	**4**

Second round
**1**	**LSU**	**11**
4	Georgia Tech	5
3	Houston	11
**2**	**USC**	**26**
6	Southwestern Louisiana	10
**5**	**Southern Miss**	**14**

Third round
**2**	**USC**	**5**
1	LSU	4
5	Southern Miss	3
**3**	**Houston**	**15**

Semifinals
**1**	**LSU**	**6**
3	Houston	4

Final
2	USC	4	6
**1**	**LSU**	**5**	**7**

=== South II Regional ===
At Starkville, MS

First round
6	Lafayette	2
**1**	**Florida State**	**7**
5	BYU	5
**2**	**Mississippi State**	**16**
4	Central Michigan	6
**3**	**Illinois**	**8**

Second round
**1**	**Florida State**	**4**
4	Central Michigan	2
**2**	**Mississippi State**	**5**
3	Illinois	3
**5**	**BYU**	**13**
6	Lafayette	3

Third round
**2**	**Mississippi State**	**11**
1	Florida State	8
**3**	**Illinois**	**8**
5	BYU	5

Semifinals
**1**	**Florida State**	**6**
3	Illinois	4

Final
**2**	**Mississippi State**	9	**4**
1	Florida State	**11**	3

=== Midwest Regional ===
At Wichita, KS

First round
**6**	**Fordham**	**8**
1	Arkansas	5
**5**	**Georgia Southern**	**4**^{13}
2	Wichita State	2
4	UCLA	4
**3**	**South Alabama**	**6**

Second round
**4**	**UCLA**	**13**
6	Fordham	8
1	Arkansas	6
**2**	**Wichita State**	**7**
3	South Alabama	4
**5**	**Georgia Southern**	**13**
6	Fordham	5
**3**	**South Alabama**	**6**

Third round
2	Wichita State	5
**4**	**UCLA**	**7**
5	Georgia Southern	2
**3**	**South Alabama**	**3**

Semifinals
4	UCLA	4
**5**	**Georgia Southern**	**5**

Final
3	South Alabama	5
**5**	**Georgia Southern**	**6**

=== Central Regional ===
At Austin, TX

First round
6	Texas–Arlington	8
**1**	**Texas**	**9**
**5**	**Creighton**	**9**
2	Clemson	6
4	Old Dominion	3
**3**	**Cal State Fullerton**	**16**

Second round
**1**	**Texas**	**10**
4	Old Dominion	0
**3**	**Cal State Fullerton**	**6**
5	Creighton	3
**2**	**Clemson**	**8**
6	Texas–Arlington	5

Third round
**3**	**Cal State Fullerton**	**5**
1	Texas	2
**5**	**Creighton**	**4**
2	Clemson	3

Semifinals
**1**	**Texas**	**11**
5	Creighton	9

Final
1	Texas	0	—
**3**	**Cal State Fullerton**	**3**	—

=== West I Regional ===
At Stanford, CA

First round
6	Campbell	0
**1**	**Stanford**	**7**
**5**	**Fresno State**	**3**
2	Southern Illinois	2
4	Middle Tennessee	6
**3**	**San Diego State**	**18**

Second round
**1**	**Stanford**	**6**
4	Middle Tennessee	1
**3**	**San Diego State**	**8**
5	Fresno State	4
**2**	**Southern Illinois**	**8**
6	Campbell	7

Third round
3	San Diego State	2
**1**	**Stanford**	**6**
5	Fresno State	1
**2**	**Southern Illinois**	**3**

Semifinals
2	Southern Illinois	3
**3**	**San Diego State**	**4**^{10}

Final
3	San Diego State	2	—
**1**	**Stanford**	**6**	—

=== West II Regional ===
At Tempe, AZ

First round
6	Penn	1
**1**	**Arizona State**	**12**
5	UC Santa Barbara	2
**2**	**Oklahoma State**	**7**
**4**	**Washington State**	**13**
3	Loyola Marymount	2

Second round
**1**	**Arizona State**	**11**
3	Loyola Marymount	9
**2**	**Oklahoma State**	**14**
4	Washington State	0
5	UC Santa Barbara	3
**6**	**Penn**	**5**

Third round
1	Arizona State	9
**2**	**Oklahoma State**	**17**
**4**	**Washington State**	**8**
6	Penn	2

Semifinals
4	Washington State	6
**1**	**Arizona State**	**8**^{10}

Final
**2**	**Oklahoma State**	**10**	—
1	Arizona State	5	—

== College World Series ==
=== Participants ===
Seeding	School	Conference	Record (conference)	Head coach	CWS appearances	CWS best finish	CWS record
1	Stanford	Pac-10	56–10 (24–6)	Mark Marquess	7 (last: 1988)	1st (1987, 1988)	17–12
2	LSU	SEC	52–17 (20–7)	Skip Bertman	3 (last: 1989)	4th (1987, 1989)	5–6
3	Oklahoma State	Big 8	53–16 (18–6)	Gary Ward	15 (last: 1987)	1st (1959)	33–29
4	Georgia	SEC	48–18 (18–9)	Steve Webber	1 (last: 1987)	8th (1987)	0–2
5	Mississippi State	SEC	49–19 (17–9)	Ron Polk	4 (last: 1985)	3rd (1985)	4–8
6	Cal State Fullerton	Big West	36–21 (13–5)	Larry Cochell	5 (last: 1988)	1st (1979, 1984)	12–8
7	The Citadel	Southern	45–12 (13–1)	Chal Port	0 (last: none)	none	0–0
8	Georgia Southern	TAAC	50–17 (17–1)	Jack Stallings	1 (last: 1973)	5th (1973)	1–2

=== Results ===
==== Bracket ====
First round
1	Stanford	5^{10}
8	Georgia Southern	4
4	Georgia	3
5	Mississippi State	0
8	Georgia Southern	1
5	Mississippi State	15
2	LSU	8
7	The Citadel	2
3	Oklahoma State	14
6	Cal State Fullerton	4
7	The Citadel	8^{12}
6	Cal State Fullerton	7

Second round
1	Stanford	2
4	Georgia	16
1	Stanford	6
5	Mississippi State	1
2	LSU	1
3	Oklahoma State	7
2	LSU	6
7	The Citadel	1

Semifinals
4	Georgia	2	5
1	Stanford	4	1
3	Oklahoma State	14	—
2	LSU	3	—

Finals
4	Georgia	2
3	Oklahoma State	1

==== Game results ====
Date	Game	Winner	Score	Loser	Notes
June 1	Game 1	Stanford	5–4 (10 innings)	Georgia Southern	
June 1	Game 2	Georgia	3–0	Mississippi State	
June 2	Game 3	LSU	8–2	The Citadel	
June 2	Game 4	Oklahoma State	14–4	Cal State Fullerton	
June 3	Game 5	Mississippi State	15–1	Georgia Southern	Georgia Southern eliminated
June 3	Game 6	Georgia	16–2	Stanford	
June 4	Game 7	The Citadel	8–7 (12 innings)	Cal State Fullerton	Cal State Fullerton eliminated
June 4	Game 8	Oklahoma State	7–1	LSU	
June 5	Game 9	Stanford	6–1	Mississippi State	Mississippi State eliminated
June 5	Game 10	LSU	6–1	The Citadel	The Citadel eliminated
June 6	Game 11	Stanford	4–2	Georgia	
June 7	Game 12	Oklahoma State	14–3	LSU	LSU eliminated
June 8	Game 13	Georgia	5–1	Stanford	Stanford eliminated
June 9	Final	Georgia	2–1	Oklahoma State	Georgia wins CWS

== All-Tournament Team ==
The following players were members of the College World Series All-Tournament Team.

Position	Player	School
P	Dave Fleming	Georgia
P	Mike Rebhan (MOP)	Georgia
C	Michael Daniel	Oklahoma State
1B	Doug Radziewicz	Georgia
2B	Troy Paulsen	Stanford
3B	Bobby Carlsen	Oklahoma State
SS	Brad Beanblossom	Oklahoma State
OF	Tim Clark	LSU
OF	Jeffrey Hammonds	Stanford
OF	Jason Rychlick	The Citadel
DH	Lyle Mouton	LSU

=== Notable players ===
- Cal State Fullerton: Frank Charles, Huck Flener, Phil Nevin, Steve Sisco
- The Citadel: Anthony Jenkins, Chris Lemonis, Dan McDonnell, Tony Skole
- Georgia: Dave Fleming
- Georgia Southern: Todd Greene, Joey Hamilton, Chris Petersen
- LSU: Paul Byrd, Rick Greene, Lyle Mouton, John O'Donoghue, Chad Ogea, Keith Osik, Mike Sirotka
- Mississippi State: Jon Shave
- Oklahoma State: Jeromy Burnitz, Dave Mlicki, Danny Perez, Brad Dolejsi
- Stanford: Paul Carey, Jeffrey Hammonds, David McCarty, Mike Mussina, Brian Sackinsky, Stan Spencer

== See also ==
- 1990 NCAA Division I softball tournament
- 1990 NCAA Division II baseball tournament
- 1990 NCAA Division III baseball tournament
- 1990 NAIA World Series
