= List of independent southern basketball champions =

This is a list of yearly claims to an Independent Southern basketball championship from since 1908 (those not in the Southern Intercollegiate Athletic Association from 1908 to 1921, those not in the South Atlantic Intercollegiate Athletic Association from 1912 to 1921, and those not in the Southern Conference from 1922 to 1932), prior to the creation of the Southeastern Conference in 1933.

Much like prior to formal national championships there were mythical national championships, before formal conference championship there were mythical conference as well as mythical regional championships. This includes those with claims to a regional Southern title but no conference affiliation.

- 1908 - Columbus YMCA and Georgetown
- 1909 - Georgetown
- 1910 - Columbus YMCA and Navy
- 1911 - Navy
- 1912 - Navy
- 1913 - Navy
- 1914 - Navy

== See also ==
- List of independent southern football champions
