= Southeastern Conference Academic Consortium =

- SECAC
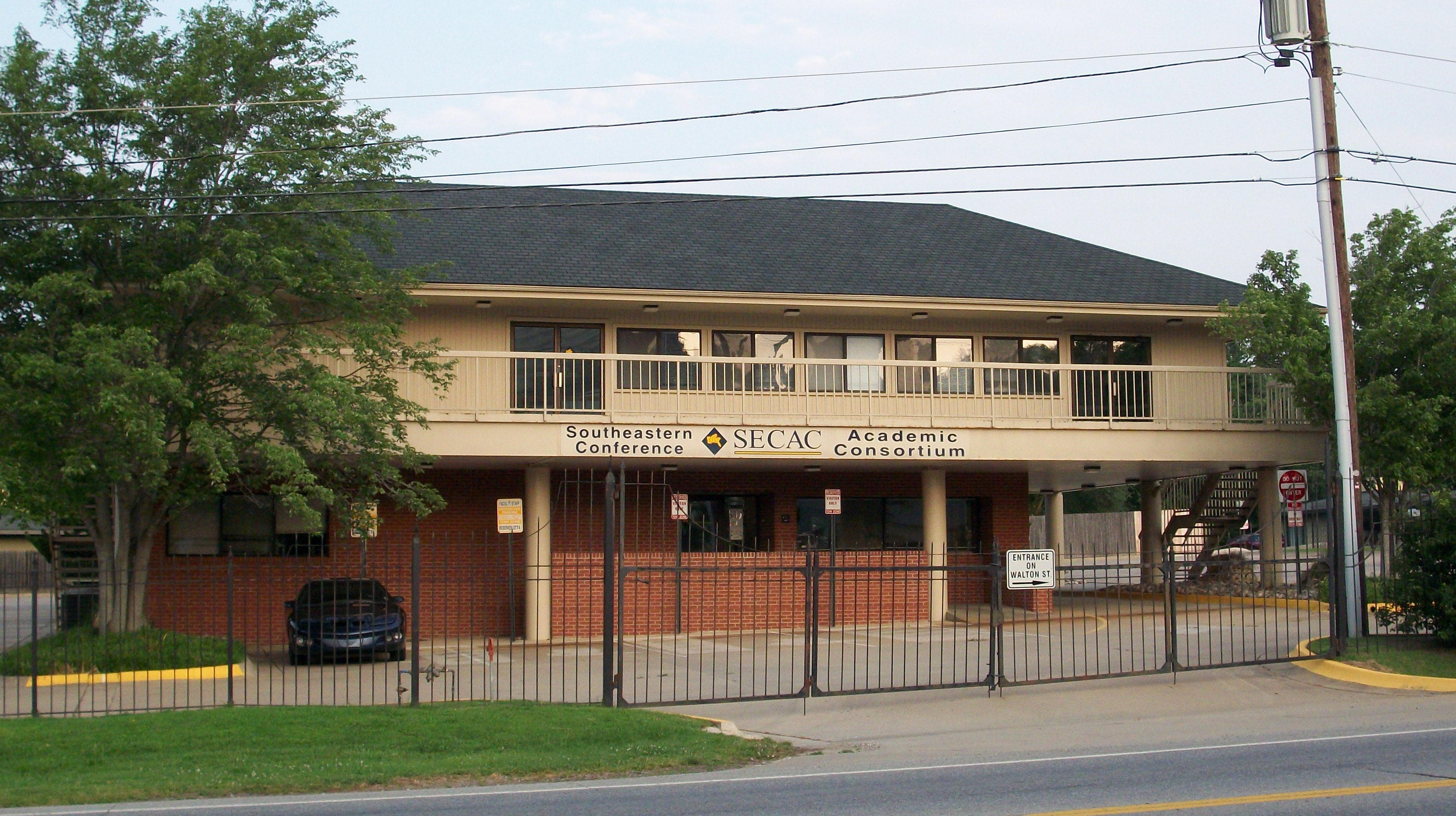
- Original SECAC building on the University of Arkansas campus in Fayetteville, Arkansas.

General information
- Location: 2201 Richard Arrington Junior Boulevard North, Birmingham, Alabama, United States
- Client: Southeastern Conference
- Owner: Southeastern Conference

The Southeastern Conference Academic Consortium in Birmingham, Alabama is a program initiated by the Southeastern Conference for its member institutions to collaborate on academic and scholastic efforts. The consortium was established in 2005 in Fayetteville, Arkansas.
