= Southeastern Conference =

Collegiate athletics conference operating primarily in the southeastern United States

- Association: NCAA
- Founded: 1932; 94 years ago
- Commissioner: Greg Sankey (since 2015)
- Sports fielded: 22; men's: 9; women's: 13
- Division: Division I
- Subdivision: FBS
- No. of teams: 16
- Headquarters: Roy F. Kramer Building; 2201 Richard Arrington Jr. Blvd. Birmingham, Alabama; United States
- Region: South; South Atlantic; East South Central; West South Central; Midwest; West North Central
- Broadcaster: ABC/ESPN/SEC Network
- Streaming partner: ESPN
- Website: secsports.com

Locations
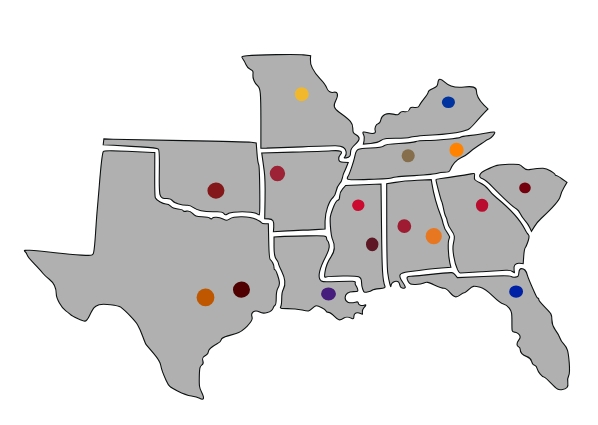

The Southeastern Conference (SEC) is a collegiate athletic conference whose member institutions are located primarily in the South Central and Southeastern United States. Its 16 members include the flagship public universities of 12 states, 3 additional public land-grant universities, and 1 private research university. The conference is headquartered in Birmingham, Alabama. The SEC participates in the National Collegiate Athletic Association (NCAA) Division I in sports competitions. In football, it is part of the Football Bowl Subdivision (FBS), formerly known as Division I-A.

The SEC was established in 1932 by 13 members of the Southern Conference. Three charter members left by the late 1960s, but additions in 1990 and 2012 grew the conference to 14 member institutions. The conference expanded to 16 members with the addition of the University of Oklahoma and the University of Texas in 2024.

In 1992, the SEC was the first NCAA Division I conference to have a championship game for football and was one of the founding member conferences of the Bowl Championship Series (BCS). The conference sponsors team championships in nine men's sports and thirteen women's sports. The conference distributed $721.8 million to its 14 schools in 2022.

== Member universities ==
=== Current members ===
The SEC consists of 16 member institutions located in the U.S. states of Alabama, Arkansas, Florida, Georgia, Kentucky, Louisiana, Mississippi, Missouri, Oklahoma, South Carolina, Tennessee and Texas.

The SEC was formerly divided into East and West Divisions, although the divisional alignment was not strictly geographic, with Missouri in the East Division while being farther west than all West Division schools except Arkansas and Texas A&M, and Auburn in the West Division despite being located farther east than East Division schools Missouri and Vanderbilt. These divisional groupings were applied only in football, men's basketball (prior to 2011–12), baseball, and women's soccer both for scheduling and standings purposes. In football, the winner of each division met in the SEC Championship Game. The SEC eliminated its divisional groupings when Oklahoma and Texas joined in 2024.

Institution	Location	Founded	Type	Enrollment (fall 2023)	Median earnings	Endowment (billions – FY24)	Nickname	Joined (Note: Represents the calendar year when fall sports competition begins.)	Colors
University of Alabama	Tuscaloosa, Alabama	1831	Public	39,622	$70,439	$2.379 (system-wide)	Crimson Tide	1932	
University of Arkansas	Fayetteville, Arkansas	1871	Public	32,140	$68,890	$1.666	Razorbacks	1991 (Note: Arkansas and South Carolina joined the SEC as full members for all sports (except football) effective the 1991–92 school year, while their football teams subsequently joined in the following school year (1992–93).)	
Auburn University	Auburn, Alabama	1856	Public	33,015	$73,151	$1.4	Tigers	1932	
University of Florida	Gainesville, Florida	1853	Public	54,814	$77,321	$2.454	Gators	1932	
University of Georgia	Athens, Georgia	1785	Public	41,615	$74,144	$2.056	Bulldogs	1932	
University of Kentucky	Lexington, Kentucky	1865	Public	32,703 (Note: Includes a small enrollment in engineering programs housed in Paducah.)	$65,922	$1.979	Wildcats	1932	
Louisiana State University (LSU)	Baton Rouge, Louisiana	1860	Public	39,418	$66,893	$1.138 (system-wide)	Tigers	1932	
University of Mississippi (Ole Miss)	University, Mississippi (Note: The U.S. Postal Service and the U.S. Census Bureau designate the location of Ole Miss as "University, Mississippi"; while their on-campus location is at Oxford, Mississippi.)	1848	Public	24,043 (Note: Includes enrollment in academic programs housed at the University of Mississippi Medical Center in Jackson.)	$66,243	$0.925	Rebels	1932	
Mississippi State University	Mississippi State, Mississippi (Note: The U.S. Postal Service and the U.S. Census Bureau designate the location of Mississippi State as "Mississippi State, Mississippi"; while their on-campus location is at Starkville, Mississippi.)	1878	Public	22,657	$59,311	$0.895	Bulldogs	1932	
University of Missouri	Columbia, Missouri	1839	Public	31,013	$69,651	$2.411 (system-wide)	Tigers	2012	
University of Oklahoma	Norman, Oklahoma	1890	Public	29,145 (Note: Enrollment at the main campus in Norman.)	$73,280	$2.95	Sooners	2024	
University of South Carolina	Columbia, South Carolina	1801	Public	36,579	$67,741	$1.044	Gamecocks	1991	
University of Tennessee	Knoxville, Tennessee	1794	Public	36,304	$67,731	$1.766 (system-wide)	Volunteers	1932	
University of Texas at Austin	Austin, Texas	1883	Public	53,082	$79,115	$47.465 (system-wide)	Longhorns	2024	
Texas A&M University	College Station, Texas	1876	Public	76,633	$76,234	$20.381 (system-wide)	Aggies	2012	
Vanderbilt University	Nashville, Tennessee	1873	Private	13,456	$101,204	$10.248	Commodores	1932	

=== Membership map ===
Southeastern Conference Members

=== Former members ===
Three schools have left the SEC, all charter members:

- The University of the South ("Sewanee") developed an elite college football program around the turn of the 20th century, with some observers opining that the 1899 "Iron Tigers" were the most dominant squad in history. However, after helping to establish the SEC in the early 1930s, it became clear that the small private institution's athletic teams could no longer compete with those from large state universities. Sewanee Tigers football squads never won a conference game, going 0–36 in league play over eight seasons while enjoying much more success against non-conference foes from comparably-sized institutions. As such, Sewanee opted to leave the SEC after the 1940 season and transitioned its athletic programs to the lower divisions of intercollegiate play. The school is currently a member of the Southern Athletic Association (SAA). (Note: Currently an NCAA Division III athletic conference.)
- Georgia Tech left the SEC in 1964 due to controversy over the conference's regulation of recruiting and scholarships. Georgia Tech athletic director and head football coach Bobby Dodd had lobbied the league to establish rules prohibiting several practices, particularly the oversigning of players by Alabama coach Bear Bryant and others. When league members voted against tightening the rules, Dodd withdrew the Yellow Jackets from the SEC. The school played as an independent for several years until 1978, when Georgia Tech joined the Atlantic Coast Conference (ACC).
- Tulane left the SEC in 1966. Although the school's athletic squads were competitive in the conference's early days, the private institution's programs struggled to compete against large state universities. This was particularly true in football, where the Green Wave were SEC champions in 1949 but never again posted a winning record in conference play. Tulane left the SEC in 1966 and subsequently considered dropping to lower levels of NCAA competition or ending its football program to focus on academics. However, the school has remained in Division I and is currently in the American Conference.

Institution	Location	Founded	Type	Nickname	Joined (Note: Represents the calendar year when fall sports competition begins.)	Left (Note: Represents the calendar year when spring sports competition ends.)	Colors	Current conference
Georgia Institute of Technology (Georgia Tech)	Atlanta, Georgia	1885	Public	Yellow Jackets	1932	1964		Atlantic Coast (ACC)
Sewanee: The University of the South	Sewanee, Tennessee	1857	Episcopal	Tigers	1932	1940		Southern (SAA)
Tulane University	New Orleans, Louisiana	1834	Nonsectarian	Green Wave	1932	1966		American

== History ==
=== Founding ===
The SEC was established December 8 and 9, 1932, in Knoxville, Tennessee, at the Farragut Hotel, when the thirteen members of the large Southern Conference located west and south of the Appalachian Mountains left to form their own conference. Ten of the thirteen founding members have remained in the conference since its inception: the University of Alabama, Auburn University, the University of Florida, the University of Georgia, the University of Kentucky, Louisiana State University ("LSU"), the University of Mississippi ("Ole Miss"), Mississippi State University, the University of Tennessee, and Vanderbilt University. The SEC had no formal headquarters during its first eight years of existence, but in 1940, former Governor of Mississippi Martin "Mike" Conner was named the conference's first president, with the league establishing its first corporate headquarters on the 13th floor of the Standard Life Building in downtown Jackson, Mississippi. The SEC office remained there until 1948, when it moved to Birmingham, Alabama, where it remains. The three founding members that have since left the conference are Sewanee, who left after the 1940 season to drop all athletic scholarships and become a D-III Independent; Georgia Tech, who left after the 1963 season and became a D-I Independent; and Tulane, who left after the 1965 season and became a D-I Independent.

In 1935, the SEC became the first conference to legalize athletic scholarships.

=== Racial integration ===
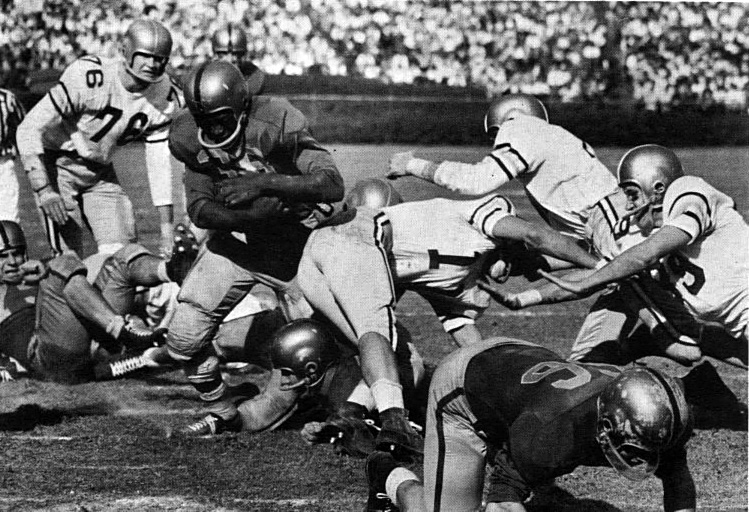
Bobby Grier playing against the Georgia Tech Yellow Jackets in 1955

White southerners committed to maintaining segregation created controversy preceding the 1956 Sugar Bowl, when the Pitt Panthers, with African-American fullback Bobby Grier on the roster, met the Georgia Tech Yellow Jackets. White southern segregationists created controversy by claiming that Grier should be barred from the game due to his race, and whether Georgia Tech should even play at all due to Georgia's Governor Marvin Griffin's opposition to racial integration. After Griffin publicly sent a telegram to the state's Board of Regents requesting Georgia Tech not to engage in racially integrated events, Georgia Tech's president Blake R. Van Leer rejected the request and threatened to resign. The game went on as planned.

The 1959 Mississippi State men's basketball team, led by all-American Bailey Howell, finished its season 24–1, winning the conference title. They did not participate in the NCAA tournament as school and state officials would not permit the team to play against Black players from northern schools. Four years later, in 1963, Loyola, with four black starters, played Mississippi State in the "Game of Change".

It was not until 1966 that African Americans first participated in an SEC athletic contest, and the first black scholarship athletes did not play in the SEC until the 1967–68 school year.

The first African American to compete in the SEC was Stephen Martin, who walked on to the Tulane baseball team in that school's final SEC season of 1966. In August of that same year, Kentucky enrolled Nate Northington and Greg Page on football scholarships, and Vanderbilt enrolled Godfrey Dillard and Perry Wallace on basketball scholarships. At the time, the NCAA did not allow freshmen to compete on varsity teams, which meant that these pioneers could not play until 1967. Page died from complications of a spinal cord injury suffered during a football practice before ever playing a game, while Dillard suffered a career-altering injury before getting a chance to play for Vanderbilt's varsity and transferred to Eastern Michigan. The remaining two both played in the 1967–68 school year. Northington made his overall debut against Indiana on September 23, 1967 and his SEC debut against Ole Miss the following week on September 30 (the day after Page's death), while Wallace made his varsity debut later that year.

=== 1990 expansion ===
In 1990, the SEC expanded from ten to twelve member universities with the addition of the Arkansas Razorbacks and the South Carolina Gamecocks. The two new members began SEC competition with the 1991–1992 basketball season.

At the same time, the SEC organized competition for some sports into two divisions. The Western Division comprised six of the seven member schools in the Central Time Zone, while the Eastern Division comprised the five member schools in the Eastern Time Zone plus Vanderbilt, which is in the Central Time Zone but was placed in the Eastern Division to preserve its rivalry with Tennessee. Initially, the divisional format was used in football, baseball, and men's basketball. The divisional format was dropped for men's basketball following the 2011–2012 season.

Following expansion, the SEC was the first conference to receive permission from the NCAA to sponsor an annual football championship game that did not count against NCAA limits on regular-season contests, featuring the winners of the conference's Eastern and Western divisions. The 1992 and 1993 championship games were held at Legion Field in Birmingham, and all championship games from 1994 onward have been held in Atlanta—first at the Georgia Dome until its closure and demolition after the 2016 season, and since 2017 at Mercedes-Benz Stadium.

=== 2012 expansion ===
On September 25, 2011, the SEC Presidents and Chancellors, acting unanimously, announced that Texas A&M University would join the SEC effective July 1, 2012, to begin competition in nineteen of the twenty sports sponsored by the SEC during the 2012–13 academic year. On November 6, 2011, the SEC commissioner announced that the University of Missouri would also join the SEC on July 1, 2012. For football, Texas A&M was scheduled to compete in the Western Division, and Missouri in the Eastern Division. Texas A&M and Missouri both left the Big 12 Conference.

=== 2024 expansion ===
On July 27, 2021, Oklahoma and Texas formally notified the SEC they were seeking "an invitation for membership." In a joint letter, Texas president Jay Hartzell and Oklahoma president Joseph Harroz Jr. wrote, "We believe that there would be mutual benefit to the Universities on the one hand, and the SEC on the other hand, for the Universities to become members of the SEC." On July 29, 2021, the presidents of the current 14 schools of the SEC voted unanimously to extend an offer of admission to Oklahoma and Texas. The boards of regents for both institutions on July 30, 2021, accepted conference membership, and the schools were slated to tentatively join the league in 2025.

On February 9, 2023, the Big 12, Texas, and Oklahoma announced they had reached a buyout agreement that allowed the schools to join the SEC in 2024. The Texas Longhorns and Oklahoma Sooners athletic teams thus began league play during the 2024–25 academic year.

=== Membership timeline ===
Full members Full members (non-football) Other Conference Other Conference

== Commissioners ==
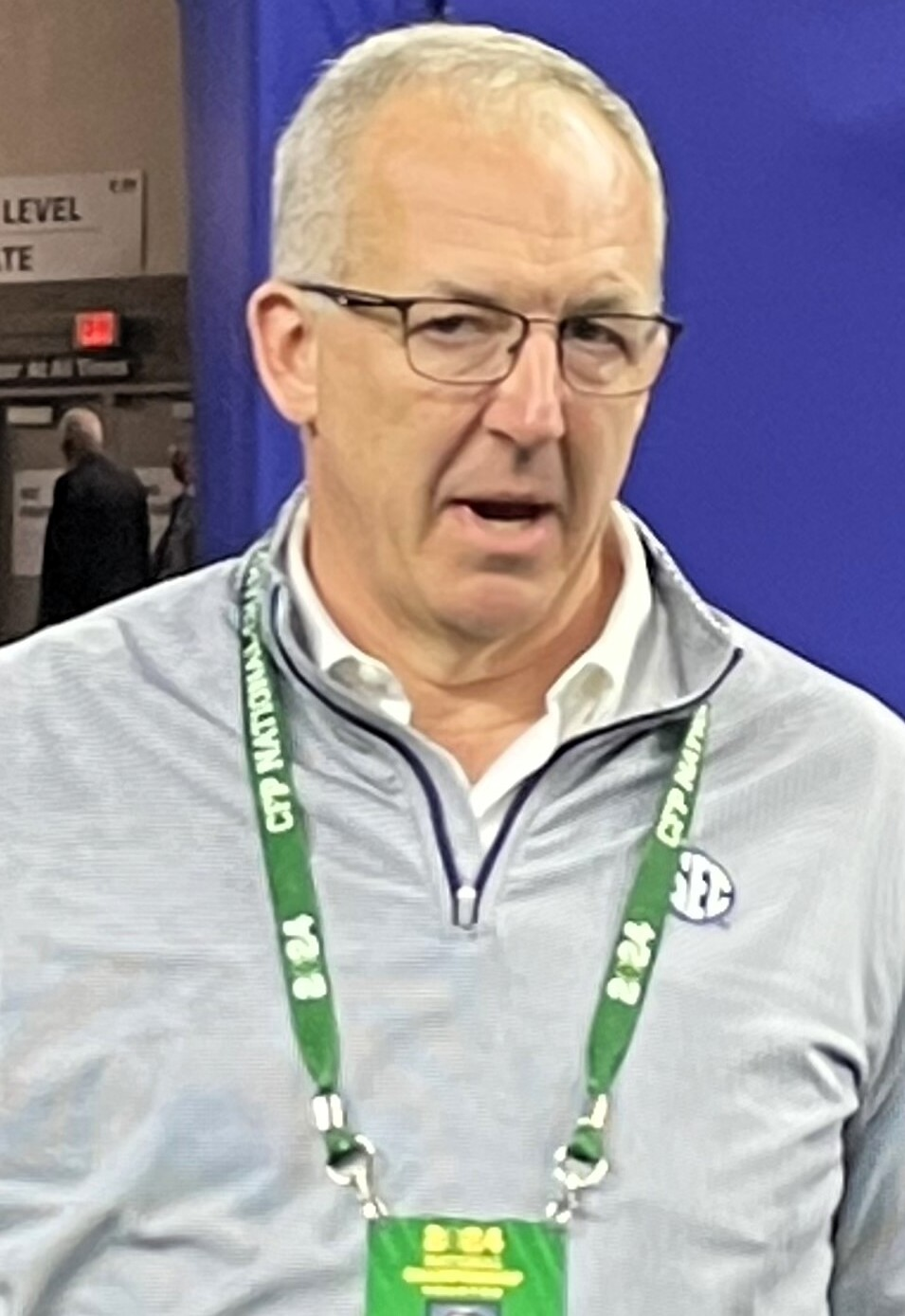
Greg Sankey has been the commissioner of the SEC since 2015.

The office of Commissioner was created in 1940.

Years	Commissioners
1940–1947	Martin S. "Mike" Conner
1947–1948	N. W. Dougherty (acting)
1948–1966	Bernie Moore
1966–1972	A. M. "Tonto" Coleman
1972–1986	H. Boyd McWhorter
1986–1989	Harvey W. Schiller
1989–1990	Mark Womack (acting)
1990–2001	Roy F. Kramer
2002–2015	Michael Slive
2015–present	Greg Sankey

== Academics ==
In 2005, the member institutions of the Southeastern Conference formed the SEC Academic Consortium (SECAC), a collaborative endeavor designed to promote research, scholarship, and achievement amongst the universities.

In 2011, the SEC Academic Consortium relocated from its original home on the campus of the University of Arkansas to the SEC headquarters in Birmingham, Alabama and was renamed SECU. The SECU rebranded its mission to better serve as a means through which the collaborative academic endeavors and achievements of Southeastern Conference universities would be promoted and advanced. The SECU's goals included highlighting the endeavors and achievements of SEC faculty, students, and its universities; advancing the academic reputation of SEC universities; identifying and preparing future leaders for high-level service in academia; increasing the amount and type of study abroad opportunities available for students; and providing opportunities for collaboration among SEC university personnel. The Big Ten Conference, since 1958, has had a similar program, now called the Big Ten Academic Alliance.

The SEC Symposium component of SECU was crafted by Vanderbilt University Chancellor Nicholas S. Zeppos, who at the time was the Vice President of the SEC Executive Committee and liaison to SECU. In an interview with Dr. Zeppos about the formation of the SECU he noted, "that the member institutions of the Southeastern Conference are committed to a shared mission of fostering research, scholarship, and achievement. The SEC Symposium represents a platform to connect, collaborate and promote a productive dialogue that will span disciplinary and institutional boundaries and allow us to work together for the betterment of society."

The SEC Academic Network was created in 2009 in partnership with ESPN. The SEC Academic Network was an online library of institutionally produced videos featuring academic initiatives and stories from all Southeastern Conference institutions. The SEC Academic Network was officially merged into the SECU operation.

=== Student profile and outcomes ===
Undergraduate campus diversity (Fall 2024)
Campus	Asian	Black	Hispanic	International	Two or more races	Unknown	White	Low-income
Alabama	1%	11%	8%	1%	4%	4%	71%	21%
Arkansas	3%	4%	12%	1%	5%	0%	74%	20%
Auburn	3%	4%	5%	2%	3%	0%	83%	14%
Florida	12%	5%	25%	3%	5%	2%	49%	23%
Georgia	13%	6%	8%	1%	4%	1%	66%	18%
Kentucky	4%	6%	7%	1%	4%	1%	76%	25%
LSU	5%	21%	11%	1%	4%	1%	57%	33%
Mississippi State	2%	16%	5%	1%	3%	1%	73%	31%
Missouri	3%	5%	6%	1%	5%	1%	79%	22%
Oklahoma	7%	5%	15%	3%	10%	2%	55%	28%
Ole Miss	2%	10%	6%	1%	3%	1%	78%	23%
South Carolina	4%	10%	7%	1%	4%	1%	72%	21%
Tennessee	4%	4%	7%	1%	5%	1%	78%	21%
Texas	26%	5%	28%	4%	4%	2%	30%	27%
Texas A&M	14%	2%	26%	1%	4%	1%	52%	21%
Vanderbilt	19%	9%	11%	11%	6%	4%	39%	23%

Undergraduate student success outcomes (Fall 2024)
Campus	Retention rate (Note: The percentage of full-time students who return to this college after completing their freshman year.)	Graduation rate (Note: The percentage of students who graduate within 8 years of starting at this college.)	Net price (Note: The average yearly cost to attend this college for students from a family income of $0K to $30K, minus any grants and scholarships the student receives. For public colleges, this is the cost for in-state students.)	Federal loan rate (Note: The percentage of undergraduate students who borrowed federal loans to help pay for college.)	Median debt (Note: The median federal loan debt of graduates of this college. This includes only federal loans taken out at this college, and excludes private student loans, Parent PLUS loans, and federal loans taken out at other colleges.)	Median earnings (Note: The median yearly incomes of former students who received federal aid 4 years after graduating from the college.)
Alabama	88%	72%	$18,067	35%	$21,500	$70,439
Arkansas	86%	68%	$12,718	35%	$20,500	$68,890
Auburn	94%	79%	$19,536	28%	$19,500	$73,151
Florida	97%	90%	$1,968	11%	$13,496	$77,321
Georgia	94%	87%	$8,995	20%	$15,623	$74,144
Kentucky	87%	69%	$12,528	36%	$19,500	$65,922
LSU	84%	71%	$14,670	35%	$19,500	$66,893
Mississippi State	83%	64%	$17,042	38%	$20,500	$59,311
Missouri	92%	75%	$15,038	38%	$18,743	$69,651
Oklahoma	89%	70%	$11,203	34%	$19,668	$73,280
Ole Miss	88%	69%	$10,536	36%	$18,750	$66,243
South Carolina	92%	77%	$13,832	42%	$20,500	$67,741
Tennessee	91%	72%	$9,626	30%	$18,750	$67,631
Texas	96%	85%	$8,979	29%	$19,000	$79,115
Texas A&M	94%	85%	$13,226	26%	$17,350	$76,234
Vanderbilt	96%	93%	$3,637	10%	$15,000	$101,204

== Financials ==
=== Source of conference revenue ===
The following table shows the source of the revenue for the Southeastern Conference during the fiscal year beginning 09-01-2024 ending 08-31-2025 as reported by ProPublica using Part VIII of the Southeastern Conference tax filing submitted on February 4, 2026.

Source of revenue	Total revenue 2024–25	Average revenue per member 2024–25
Contributions, gifts, grants	$10,498,563	$656,160
TV and radio rights fees	$772,165,763	$48,260,360
Post-season events	$296,098,029	$18,506,127
Investment income	$14,134,630	$883,414
Royalties	$13,954,694	$872,168
Net gain from sale of assets	$2,067,449	$129,216
Total	$1,108,919,128	$69,307,446

=== Conference distributions ===
The following table shows Southeastern Conference distributions during the fiscal year beginning 09-01-2024 ending 08-31-2025 as reported by ProPublica using Schedule A of the Southeastern Conference tax filing submitted on February 4, 2026.

Institution	2024–25 Distribution
University of Alabama	$72,792,940
University of Arkansas	$73,083,520
Auburn University	$70,802,740
University of Florida	$72,068,145
University of Georgia	$74,458,940
University of Kentucky	$70,485,750
Louisiana State University	$72,391,720
University of Mississippi	$73,076,485
Mississippi State University	$70,342,415
University of Missouri	$72,855,455
University of South Carolina	$72,741,821
University of Tennessee	$73,587,225
Texas A&M University	$72,899,870
Vanderbilt University	$71,492,110
University of Oklahoma	$2,575,481
University of Texas	$12,113,287
Average for 14 Longterm Members Average for 2 New Members	$72,362,795 $7,344,384

=== CNBC list of the most valuable SEC schools ===
Rankings as of December 19, 2025 (2024–2025 academic year)

SEC	NCAA	School	Valuation	Value Change	Revenue	Revenue Change
1	1	Texas Longhorns	$1.48 billion	▲16%	$332 million	▲23%
2	3	Texas A&M Aggies	$1.32 billion	▲5%	$266 million	▼5%
3	4	Georgia Bulldogs	$1.16 billion	▲22%	$242 million	▲15%
4	7	Tennessee Volunteers	$1.12 billion	▲19%	$234 million	▲16%
5	9	Alabama Crimson Tide	$1.09 billion	▲11%	$235 million	▲18%
6	12	LSU Tigers	$1.05 billion	▲15%	$220 million	▲10%
7	13	Oklahoma Sooners	$1.01 billion	▲9%	$209 million	▲5%
8	14	Florida Gators	$975 million	▲13%	$200 million	▲6%
9	15	Kentucky Wildcats	$910 million	▲17%	$202 million	▲16%
10	21	South Carolina Gamecocks	$812 million	▲25%	$183 million	▲14%
11	22	Auburn Tigers	$810 million	▲5%	$194 million	▼1%
12	24	Arkansas Razorbacks	$800 million	▲3%	$171 million	▲2%
13	30	Ole Miss Rebels	$755 million	▲16%	$149 million	▲5%
14	31	Missouri Tigers	$700 million	▲19%	$168 million	▲18%
15	35	Vanderbilt Commodores	$655 million	▲19%	$141 million	▲13%
16	38	Mississippi State Bulldogs	$625 million	▲20%	$127 million	▲9%

=== Athletic department revenue by school ===
Total revenue includes ticket sales, contributions and donations, rights and licensing, student fees, school funds and all other sources including TV income, camp income, concessions, and novelties.

Total expenses includes coach and staff salaries, scholarships, buildings and grounds, maintenance, utilities and rental fees, recruiting, team travel, equipment and uniforms, conference dues, and insurance.

The following table shows institutional reporting to the United States Department of Education as shown on the DOE Equity in Athletics website for the 2023–24 academic year.

Institution	2023–24 Total Revenue from Athletics	2023–24 Total Expenses on Athletics
University of Texas at Austin	$320,312,665	$237,475,591
University of Alabama	$243,096,720	$243,096,720
University of Georgia	$241,843,474	$182,882,099
Texas A&M University	$231,773,287	$223,847,369
Louisiana State University	$220,281,227	$218,545,643
University of Tennessee	$204,906,178	$204,906,178
University of Kentucky	$193,967,575	$193,915,782
Auburn University	$193,417,486	$182,486,390
University of Oklahoma	$188,933,196	$188,623,620
University of South Carolina	$183,652,273	$183,652,273
University of Florida	$180,556,616	$180,556,616
University of Arkansas	$170,608,754	$170,011,614
University of Missouri	$157,734,870	$157,734,870
University of Mississippi	$145,401,658	$145,401,658
Vanderbilt University	$140,707,218	$140,707,218
Mississippi State University	$125,114,437	$125,114,437

== Key personnel ==
School	Athletic director	Football coach	Men's basketball coach	Women's basketball coach	Baseball coach	Softball coach	Volleyball coach	Women's soccer coach
Alabama	Greg Byrne	Kalen DeBoer	Nate Oats	Pauline Love	Rob Vaughn	Patrick Murphy	Rashinda Reed	Wes Hart
Arkansas	Hunter Yurachek	Ryan Silverfield	John Calipari	Kelsi Musick	Dave Van Horn	Courtney Deifel	Jason Watson	Colby Hale
Auburn	John Cohen	Alex Golesh	Steven Pearl	Larry Vickers	Butch Thompson	Chris Malveaux & Kate Malveaux	Brent Crouch	James Armstrong
Florida	Scott Stricklin	Jon Sumrall	Todd Golden	Tammi Reiss	Kevin O'Sullivan	Tim Walton	Ryan Thies	Nick Zimmerman
Georgia	Josh Brooks	Kirby Smart	Mike White	Ayla Guzzardo	Wes Johnson	Tony Baldwin	Tom Black	Keidane McAlpine
Kentucky	J Batt	Will Stein	Mark Pope	Kenny Brooks	Nick Mingione	Rachel Lawson	Craig Skinner	Troy Fabiano
LSU	Verge Ausberry	Lane Kiffin	Will Wade	Kim Mulkey	Jay Johnson	Beth Torina	Tonya Johnson	Sian Hudson
Ole Miss	Keith Carter	Pete Golding	Chris Beard	Yolett McPhee-McCuin	Mike Bianco	Jamie Trachsel	Bre Henry	Todd Shulenberger
Mississippi State	Zac Selmon	Jeff Lebby	Chris Jans	Sam Purcell	Brian O'Connor	Samantha Ricketts	Julie Darty	Kevin O'Brien
Missouri	Laird Veatch	Eliah Drinkwitz	Dennis Gates	Kellie Harper	Kerrick Jackson	Larissa Anderson	Dawn Sullivan	Stefanie Golan
Oklahoma	Roger Denny	Brent Venables	Porter Moser	Jennie Baranczyk	Skip Johnson	Patty Gasso	Aaron Mansfield	Matt Mott
South Carolina	Jeremiah Donati	Shane Beamer	Lamont Paris	Dawn Staley	Kevin Schnall	Ashley Chastain	Tom Mendoza	Shelley Smith
Tennessee	Danny White	Josh Heupel	Rick Barnes	Kim Caldwell	Josh Elander	Karen Weekly	Eve Rackham	Joe Kirt
Texas	Chris Del Conte	Steve Sarkisian	Sean Miller	Vic Schaefer	Jim Schlossnagle	Mike White	Jerritt Elliott	Margueritte Bates
Texas A&M	Trev Alberts	Mike Elko	Bucky McMillan	Joni Taylor	Michael Earley	Trisha Ford	Jamie Morrison	Bobby Shuttleworth
Vanderbilt	Candice Storey Lee	Clark Lea	Mark Byington	Shea Ralph	Tim Corbin	No team	Anders Nelson	Darren Ambrose

== Facilities ==
School	Football stadium	Capacity	Basketball arena	Capacity	Baseball stadium	Capacity
Alabama	Saban Field at Bryant-Denny Stadium	100,077	Coleman Coliseum	15,383	Sewell-Thomas Stadium	8,500
Arkansas	Donald W. Reynolds Razorback Stadium (Note: One game played each year at War Memorial Stadium in Little Rock.)	76,212	Bud Walton Arena	19,368	Baum-Walker Stadium	10,737
Auburn	Pat Dye Field at Jordan-Hare Stadium	88,043	Neville Arena	9,121	Plainsman Park	6,300
Florida	Steve Spurrier-Florida Field at Ben Hill Griffin Stadium	88,548	O'Connell Center	10,571	Condron Ballpark	7,000
Georgia	Dooley Field at Sanford Stadium	93,033	Stegeman Coliseum	10,523	Foley Field	3,633
Kentucky	Kroger Field	61,000	Rupp Arena; Memorial Coliseum	20,545; 6,250	Kentucky Proud Park	5,000 (Note: Listed capacity includes grass seating; fixed capacity is 2,500. Expandable to 7,000.)
LSU	Tiger Stadium	102,321	Pete Maravich Assembly Center	13,215	Alex Box Stadium	10,326
Ole Miss	Vaught-Hemingway Stadium	64,038	The Sandy and John Black Pavilion at Ole Miss	9,500	Swayze Field	11,477
Mississippi State	Davis Wade Stadium at Scott Field	60,311	Humphrey Coliseum	9,100	Dudy Noble Field	15,000 (Note: Dudy Noble Field's official seating capacity is 7,200, but its total capacity is 15,000, which includes privately owned seating in Left Field Lounge. Mississippi State holds the all-time NCAA on-campus record for one day attendance at 15,586.)
Missouri	Faurot Field at Memorial Stadium	63,609	Mizzou Arena	15,061	Taylor Stadium	3,031
Oklahoma	Gaylord Family Oklahoma Memorial Stadium	80,126	Lloyd Noble Center	10,967	Kimrey Family Stadium	3,180
South Carolina	Williams-Brice Stadium	77,559	Colonial Life Arena	18,000	Founders Park	8,242
Tennessee	Neyland Stadium	101,915	Thompson-Boling Arena	21,678	Lindsey Nelson Stadium	5,548
Texas	Darrell K Royal-Texas Memorial Stadium	100,119	Moody Center	10,000 (Note: Standard capacity for basketball; expandable to 15,000.)	UFCU Disch-Falk Field	6,649
Texas A&M	Kyle Field	102,733	Reed Arena	12,989	Blue Bell Park	6,100
Vanderbilt	FirstBank Stadium	35,000	Memorial Gymnasium	14,316	Hawkins Field	3,700

== Sports ==
The Southeastern Conference sponsors championship competition in nine men's and thirteen women's NCAA sanctioned sports. Under SEC conference rules reflecting the large number of male scholarship participants in football and attempting to address gender equity concerns (see also Title IX), each member institution is required to provide two more women's varsity sports than men's. A similar rule was recently adopted by the NCAA for all of Division I.

Teams in SEC conference competition
Sport	Men's	Women's
Baseball	16	–
Basketball	16	16
Cross country	14	16
Equestrian	–	4
Football	16	–
Golf	16	16
Gymnastics	–	9
Rowing	–	4
Soccer	–	16
Softball	–	15
Swimming & diving	11	13
Tennis	15	16
Indoor track & field	15	16
Outdoor track & field	15	16
Volleyball	–	16

=== Men's sponsored sports by school ===
School	Baseball	Basketball	Cross country	Football	Golf	Swimming and diving	Tennis	Track and field (indoor)	Track and field (outdoor)	Total SEC sports
Alabama	Yes	Yes	Yes	Yes	Yes	Yes	Yes	Yes	Yes	9
Arkansas	Yes	Yes	Yes	Yes	Yes	No	Yes	Yes	Yes	8
Auburn	Yes	Yes	Yes	Yes	Yes	Yes	Yes	Yes	Yes	9
Florida	Yes	Yes	Yes	Yes	Yes	Yes	Yes	Yes	Yes	9
Georgia	Yes	Yes	Yes	Yes	Yes	Yes	Yes	Yes	Yes	9
Kentucky	Yes	Yes	Yes	Yes	Yes	Yes	Yes	Yes	Yes	9
LSU	Yes	Yes	Yes	Yes	Yes	Yes	Yes	Yes	Yes	9
Mississippi State	Yes	Yes	No	Yes	Yes	No	Yes	Yes	Yes	7
Missouri	Yes	Yes	Yes	Yes	Yes	Yes	No	Yes	Yes	8
Oklahoma	Yes	Yes	Yes	Yes	Yes	No	Yes	Yes	Yes	8
Ole Miss	Yes	Yes	Yes	Yes	Yes	No	Yes	Yes	Yes	8
South Carolina	Yes	Yes	No	Yes	Yes	Yes	Yes	Yes	Yes	8
Tennessee	Yes	Yes	Yes	Yes	Yes	Yes	Yes	Yes	Yes	9
Texas	Yes	Yes	Yes	Yes	Yes	Yes	Yes	Yes	Yes	9
Texas A&M	Yes	Yes	Yes	Yes	Yes	Yes	Yes	Yes	Yes	9
Vanderbilt	Yes	Yes	Yes	Yes	Yes	No	Yes	No	No	6
Totals	16	16	14	16	16	11	15	15	15	116

Men's varsity sports not sponsored by the Southeastern Conference which are played by SEC schools:

School	Gymnastics	Rifle (Note: Rifle is technically a men's sport, but men's, women's, and coed teams all compete against each other. Kentucky has a coed team.)	Soccer	Wrestling
Kentucky	No	GARC	Sun Belt	No
Missouri	No	No	No	Big 12
Oklahoma	MPSF	No	No	Big 12
South Carolina	No	No	Sun Belt	No

=== Women's sponsored sports by school ===
School	Basketball	Cross country	Equestrian	Golf	Gymnastics	Rowing	Soccer	Softball	Swimming and diving	Tennis	Track and field (indoor)	Track and field (outdoor)	Volleyball	Total SEC sports
Alabama	Yes	Yes	No	Yes	Yes	Yes	Yes	Yes	Yes	Yes	Yes	Yes	Yes	12
Arkansas	Yes	Yes	No	Yes	Yes	No	Yes	Yes	Yes	Yes	Yes	Yes	Yes	11
Auburn	Yes	Yes	Yes	Yes	Yes	No	Yes	Yes	Yes	Yes	Yes	Yes	Yes	12
Florida	Yes	Yes	No	Yes	Yes	No	Yes	Yes	Yes	Yes	Yes	Yes	Yes	11
Georgia	Yes	Yes	Yes	Yes	Yes	No	Yes	Yes	Yes	Yes	Yes	Yes	Yes	12
Kentucky	Yes	Yes	No	Yes	Yes	No	Yes	Yes	Yes	Yes	Yes	Yes	Yes	11
LSU	Yes	Yes	No	Yes	Yes	No	Yes	Yes	Yes	Yes	Yes	Yes	Yes	11
Mississippi State	Yes	Yes	No	Yes	No	No	Yes	Yes	No	Yes	Yes	Yes	Yes	9
Missouri	Yes	Yes	No	Yes	Yes	No	Yes	Yes	Yes	Yes	Yes	Yes	Yes	11
Oklahoma	Yes	Yes	No	Yes	Yes	Yes	Yes	Yes	No	Yes	Yes	Yes	Yes	11
Ole Miss	Yes	Yes	No	Yes	No	No	Yes	Yes	No	Yes	Yes	Yes	Yes	9
South Carolina	Yes	Yes	Yes	Yes	No	No	Yes	Yes	Yes	Yes	Yes	Yes	Yes	11
Tennessee	Yes	Yes	No	Yes	No	Yes	Yes	Yes	Yes	Yes	Yes	Yes	Yes	11
Texas	Yes	Yes	No	Yes	No	Yes	Yes	Yes	Yes	Yes	Yes	Yes	Yes	11
Texas A&M	Yes	Yes	Yes	Yes	No	No	Yes	Yes	Yes	Yes	Yes	Yes	Yes	11
Vanderbilt	Yes	Yes	No	Yes	No	No	Yes	No	Yes	Yes	Yes	Yes	Yes	9
Totals	16	16	4	16	9	4	16	15	13	16	16	16	16	153

Women's varsity sports not sponsored by the Southeastern Conference which are played by SEC schools:

School	Beach volleyball	Bowling	Lacrosse	Rifle (Note: Rifle is technically a men's sport, but men's, women's, and coed teams all compete against each other. Kentucky has a coed team, and Ole Miss has a women's team.)	Stunt (Note: An all-female cheerleading discipline that emphasizes acrobatics. Graduated from the NCAA Emerging Sports for Women program to full championship status in January 2026, with the first NCAA championship to be held in 2026–27.)
Florida	No	No	Big 12	No	No
Kentucky	No	No	No	GARC	Independent
LSU	MPSF	No	No	No	No
Ole Miss	No	No	No	PRC	No
South Carolina	Big 12	No	No	No	No
Texas	MPSF	No	No	No	No
Vanderbilt	No	CUSA	American	No	No

- In addition to the above, Kentucky lists its coeducational cheerleading squad and its all-female dance team as varsity teams on its athletics website.

== Conference champions ==
The Southeastern Conference sponsors nine men's sports and 13 women's sports, and awards a conference championship in every one of them.

=== Current champions ===
- (RS) indicates regular-season champion
- (T) indicates tournament champion
- Champions from the previous academic year are indicated with the year of their title.

Season	Sport	Men's champion		Women's champion	
Fall 2025	Cross country	Alabama		Florida	
Fall 2025	Football	Georgia		–	
Fall 2025	Soccer	–		Arkansas (RS)	Vanderbilt (T)
Fall 2025	Volleyball	–		Kentucky (RS & T)	
Winter 2025–26	Basketball	Florida (RS)	Arkansas (T)	South Carolina (RS)	Texas (T)
Winter 2025–26	Equestrian	–		Texas A&M	
Winter 2025–26	Gymnastics	–		Oklahoma (RS)	Florida (T)
Winter 2025–26	Swimming and diving	Texas		Texas	
Winter 2025–26	Track and field (indoor)	Arkansas		Florida	
Spring 2026	Baseball	Georgia (RS & T)		–	
Spring 2026	Softball	–		Oklahoma (RS)	Texas (T)
Spring 2026	Golf	Ole Miss		Tennessee	
Spring 2026	Rowing	–		Tennessee	
Spring 2026	Tennis	Texas (RS & T)		Auburn, Oklahoma, Texas (RS)	Auburn (T)
Spring 2026	Track and field (outdoor)	Arkansas		Florida	

Source: SECSports.com.

== Football ==
For the current season, see 2026 Southeastern Conference football season.

=== Scheduling ===
SEC teams did not play a uniform number of conference games until 1974. Prior to that, the number of conference games teams played ranged from four to eight, but most played a 6- or 7- game schedule. The league adopted a uniform 6-game schedule from 1974 to 1987, and added a seventh conference game from 1988 to 1991. Through this period and through the earlier years each SEC school had five permanent opponents, developing some traditional rivalries between schools, and the other games rotated around the other members of the conference.

After expansion to twelve programs in 1992, the SEC went to an 8-game conference schedule, with each team playing the five other teams in their division and three opponents from the other division. The winners of the two divisions would then meet in the SEC Championship Game.

From 1992 through 2002, each team had two permanent inter-divisional opponents, allowing many traditional rivalries from the pre-expansion era (such as Florida vs. Auburn, Kentucky vs. LSU, and Vanderbilt vs. Alabama) to continue. However, complaints from some league athletic directors about imbalance in the schedule (for instance, Auburn's two permanent opponents from the East were Florida and Georgia – two of the SEC's stronger football programs at the time – while Mississippi State played Kentucky and South Carolina every year) led to the SEC reducing the number of permanent inter-division opponents to one starting in the 2003 season. The TV networks televising SEC games were also pressuring for the change so attractive match-ups between non-traditional opponents would happen twice every five years instead of twice every eight years.

	1992–2011 Divisional Rival	1992–2002 Divisional Rival
East
Georgia	Auburn	Ole Miss
Florida	LSU	Auburn
Kentucky	Mississippi State	LSU
South Carolina	Arkansas	Mississippi State
Tennessee	Alabama	Arkansas
Vanderbilt	Ole Miss	Alabama
West
Alabama	Tennessee	Vanderbilt
Arkansas	South Carolina	Tennessee
Auburn	Georgia	Florida
LSU	Florida	Kentucky
Mississippi State	Kentucky	South Carolina
Ole Miss	Vanderbilt	Georgia

Under the format used from 2012 to 2023 when the SEC had 14 teams, each school played a total of eight conference games, consisting of the other six teams in its division, one school from the other division on a rotating basis, and one school from the other division that it plays each year. Non-permanent cross-division opponents face each other in the regular season twice in a span of twelve years. The permanent cross-division matchups were: Alabama–Tennessee; Arkansas–Missouri; Auburn–Georgia; LSU–Florida; Mississippi State–Kentucky; Ole Miss–Vanderbilt; Texas A&M–South Carolina.

The then-current scheduling arrangement was originally set to expire after the 2015 season, but the SEC presidents voted 10–4 in April 2014 to keep the current format for an additional six to eight seasons beyond 2015. Additionally, since 2016, SEC teams have been required to schedule at least one opponent each season from the other so-called "Power Five" conferences (ACC, Big Ten, Big 12, or Pac-12); games against select football independent schools also qualify, including Army (which no longer counts as of 2024 due to it joining the American Athletic Conference, a Group of Five conference), BYU (before it joined the Big 12 in 2023), and Notre Dame.

In 2023, the SEC announced the divisional split would be scrapped when Oklahoma and Texas join in 2024. The conference schedule will remain at 8 games in the 2024 and 2025 seasons while the SEC determines its long-term football scheduling format. Teams will play the same opponents in both seasons on a home-and-home basis. Each of the 14 members in the conference in 2023 will play either Oklahoma or Texas in 2024 and '25, but not both. The requirement of scheduling at least one Power Four (the Pac-12 lost all but two of its members, Oregon State and Washington State, before the 2024 season; the Beavers have meetings with Ole Miss scheduled in 2027 and 2030, while the Cougars are slated to face Mississippi State in 2030 and '31) team or Notre Dame remains in place. The championship game will feature the top two teams in the conference standings, with tiebreakers as needed.

Starting in 2026, the SEC will schedule nine conference games (up from eight) per school in a bid to increase its members' chances at the College Football Playoff. Each school will play three annual opponents and each team's remaining six games will rotate among the remaining conference schools. Under this format every school will play every other school at least once in two years and twice (home and away) in four years. In addition the SEC announced that teams must annually schedule at least one high-quality non-conference opponent from the ACC, Big Ten or Big 12 conferences or Notre Dame every year.

	Protected Rivalries		
Alabama	Auburn	Tennessee	Mississippi State
Arkansas	LSU	Texas	Missouri
Auburn	Alabama	Georgia	Vanderbilt
Florida	Georgia	South Carolina	Kentucky
Georgia	Florida	Auburn	South Carolina
Kentucky	Tennessee	Florida	South Carolina
LSU	Ole Miss	Arkansas	Texas A&M
Mississippi State	Ole Miss	Alabama	Vanderbilt
Missouri	Arkansas	Oklahoma	Texas A&M
Oklahoma	Texas	Missouri	Ole Miss
Ole Miss	Mississippi State	LSU	Oklahoma
South Carolina	Georgia	Florida	Kentucky
Tennessee	Alabama	Kentucky	Vanderbilt
Texas	Oklahoma	Texas A&M	Arkansas
Texas A&M	Texas	LSU	Missouri
Vanderbilt	Tennessee	Auburn	Mississippi State

=== All-time school records (ranked according to winning percentage) ===
Through end of the 2023 season including SEC Championship Game. Records reflect official NCAA results, including any forfeits or win vacating.

#	Team	Won	Loss	Tied	Win %	Division Championships	SEC Championships	Claimed National Championships
1	Alabama	965	337	43	.733	16	30	18
2	Oklahoma	944	341	53	.725	0	0	7
3	Texas	948	392	33	.702	0	0	4
4	Tennessee	865	414	53	.669	6	13	6
5	Georgia	881	429	54	.666	13	16	4
6	LSU	806	434	47	.645	10	12	4
7	Florida	758	445	40	.626	15	8	3
8	Auburn	799	471	47	.625	6	8	9
9	Texas A&M	778	504	48	.603	0	0	3
10	Arkansas	740	539	40	.576	3	0	1
11	Ole Miss	675	547	35	.551	0	6	3
12	Missouri	711	590	52	.545	2	0	1
13	South Carolina	635	612	44	.509	1	0	0
14	Kentucky	643	647	44	.499	0	2	1
15	Mississippi State	586	609	39	.491	1	1	0
16	Vanderbilt	618	665	50	.482	0	0	0

Notes:

- Alabama's record reflects 21 wins being vacated (2005–2007) and eight wins and one tie forfeited (1993).
- Kentucky's record reflects 10 vacated wins from 2021.
- LSU's record reflects 37 wins being vacated (2012–2015) for major level-1 rule violations and playing with ineligible players.
- Mississippi State's record reflects 18 wins and one tie being forfeited (1975–1977).
- Ole Miss's record reflects 33 wins being vacated (2010–2016).
- Tennessee's record reflects 11 wins being vacated (2019–2020) for 18 Level −1 violations encompassing more than 200 individual infractions and an additional four (4) Level-1 unethical conduct violations along with playing 16 ineligible players.
- Two former members have also won conference titles, Georgia Tech five and Tulane three.
- Vanderbilt has been awarded 6 National Championship titles, although the school does not claim them

=== Championship game ===
From its establishment in 1992 through 2023, the SEC Championship Game pitted the SEC West Division representative against the East Division representative in a game held after the regular season has been completed. Since 2024, when the SEC eliminated its football divisions, the game has featured the top two teams in the conference standings. The first two SEC Championship football games were held at Legion Field in Birmingham, Alabama. Since 1994, it has been played in Atlanta—first at the Georgia Dome through 2016, and since 2017 at its replacement, Mercedes-Benz Stadium, with the current hosting contract running through 2027. The "home team" designation alternated between the division champions during the divisional era, going to the East champion in even-numbered years and the West champion in odd-numbered years. The West led 19–13 in overall wins in the championship game against the East during the divisional era. As of 2024, the only members without a Championship Game appearance are Kentucky, Oklahoma, Ole Miss, Texas A&M, and Vanderbilt.

=== Bowl games ===
The post-season bowl game tie-ins for the SEC for the 2026 seasons are as follows. If additional SEC teams are selected to participate in the College Football Playoff, all other bowl-eligible teams move up one spot in the order.

Pick	Name	Location	Opposing conference	Opposing pick
1	College Football Playoff	Misc.	All FBS Conferences	N/A
2	Citrus Bowl	Orlando, Florida	Big Ten	2
3/4/5/6/7/8	ReliaQuest Bowl	Tampa, Florida	Big Ten	3
3/4/5/6/7/8	Duke's Mayo Bowl	Charlotte, North Carolina	ACC¤	5/6/7
3/4/5/6/7/8	Las Vegas Bowl	Paradise, Nevada	Legacy Pac-12 (Big Ten, Big 12, ACC)	2
3/4/5/6/7/8	Texas Bowl	Houston, Texas	Big 12	4
3/4/5/6/7/8	Liberty Bowl	Memphis, Tennessee	Big 12	5
3/4/5/6/7/8	Gator Bowl	Jacksonville, Florida	ACC	2/3/4
3/4/5/6/7/8	Music City Bowl	Nashville, Tennessee	Big Ten	5
9/10	Gasparilla Bowl	Tampa, Florida	ESPN Pool (Typically ACC)	8/9/10/11 (ACC)
9/10	Birmingham Bowl	Birmingham, Alabama	ESPN Pool (Typically American)	3/4/5/6/7/8

¤ The Big Ten and SEC will alternate which conference sends a team to the Duke's Mayo Bowl or the Las Vegas Bowl. SEC will be in the Las Vegas Bowl during the even years and Duke's Mayo Bowl during the odd years.

=== Head coach compensation ===
The total pay of head coaches includes university and non-university compensation including base salary, income from contracts, foundation supplements, bonuses and media and radio pay as of the most recent 2025 season.

Conference pay rank	Institution	Head coach	2025 total pay
1	University of Georgia	Kirby Smart	$13,282,580
2	Louisiana State University	Lane Kiffin	$13,000,000
3	University of Texas	Steve Sarkisian	$10,600,000
4	University of Alabama	Kalen Deboer	$10,000,000
5	University of Kentucky	Will Stein	$5,500,000
6	University of Missouri	Eliah Drinkwitz	$9,000,000
7	University of Tennessee	Josh Heupel	$9,000,000
8	University of Oklahoma	Brent Venables	$8,152,000
9	University of Florida	Jon Sumrall	$7,450,000
10	Texas A&M University	Mike Elko	$7,000,000
11	University of Mississippi	Pete Golding	$6,800,000
12	Auburn University	Alex Golesh	$6,750,000
13	University of Arkansas	Ryan Silverfield	$6,500,000
14	University of South Carolina	Shane Beamer	$6,401,996
15	Mississippi State University	Jeff Lebby	$4,250,000
16	Vanderbilt University	Clark Lea	$3,189,744

=== Player awards ===
Each year, the conference selects various individual awards. In 1994, the conference began honoring former players from each school annually with the SEC Football Legends program.

=== 50th anniversary All-Time SEC Team ===
In 1982, the SEC Skywriters, a group of media covering the Southeastern Conference, selected members of their All-Time SEC Team for the first fifty years (1933–82) of the SEC.

Coach: Paul "Bear" Bryant

Offense
QB Archie Manning, Ole Miss 1968–70
HB Charley Trippi, Georgia 1942,45–46
HB Billy Cannon, LSU 1957–59
HB Herschel Walker, Georgia 1980–82
WR Don Hutson, Alabama 1932–34
WR Terry Beasley, Auburn 1969–71
TE Ozzie Newsome, Alabama 1974–77
OL John Hannah, Alabama 1970–72
OL Bruiser Kinard, Ole Miss 1935–37
OC Dwight Stephenson, Alabama 1977–79
OL Bob Suffridge, Tennessee 1938–40
OL Billy Neighbors, Alabama 1959–61
PK Fuad Reveiz, Tennessee 1981–84

Defense
DL Doug Atkins, Tennessee 1950–52
DL Bill Stanfill, Georgia 1966–68
DL Jack Youngblood, Florida 1968–70
DL Lou Michaels, Kentucky 1955–57
DL Gaynell Tinsley, LSU 1934–36
LB Lee Roy Jordan, Alabama 1960–62
LB Jack Reynolds, Tennessee 1967–69
LB D. D. Lewis, Miss. State 1965–67
DB Tucker Frederickson, Auburn 1962–64
DB Jake Scott, Georgia 1967–68
DB Tommy Casanova, LSU 1969–71
DB Don McNeal, Alabama 1977–79
DB Jimmy Patton, Ole Miss 1953–55
P Craig Colquitt, Tennessee 1975–77

=== Intra-conference football rivalries ===
The members of the SEC have longstanding rivalries with each other, especially on the football field. The following is a list of active rivalries in the Southeastern Conference with totals & records through the completion of the 2024 season.

Team	Team	Rivalry Name	Trophy	Meetings	Record	Series Leader	Current Streak
Alabama	Auburn	Iron Bowl	Foy, V-ODK Sportsmanship Trophy	89	51–37–1	Alabama	Alabama won 5
Alabama	Florida	Alabama–Florida football rivalry	None	42	27–14	Alabama	Alabama won 8
Alabama	Georgia	Alabama–Georgia football rivalry	None	74	44–26–4	Alabama	Alabama won 2
Alabama	LSU	First Saturday in November	None	89	57–27–5	Alabama	Alabama won 2
Alabama	Mississippi State	Alabama–Mississippi State football rivalry	None	108	86–18–3	Alabama	Alabama won 16
Alabama	Ole Miss	Alabama–Ole Miss football rivalry	None	71	55–10–2	Alabama	Alabama won 8
Alabama	Tennessee	Third Saturday in October	None	107	59–40–7	Alabama	Tennessee won 1
Arkansas	LSU	Arkansas–LSU football rivalry	Golden Boot	70	43–23–2	LSU	LSU won 3
Arkansas	Missouri	Battle Line Rivalry	Battle Line Trophy	16	12–4	Missouri	Missouri won 3
Arkansas	Ole Miss	Arkansas–Ole Miss football rivalry	None	71	37–31–1	Arkansas	Ole Miss won 2
Arkansas	Texas	Arkansas–Texas football rivalry	None	80	57–23	Texas	Texas won 1
Arkansas	Texas A&M	Arkansas–Texas A&M football rivalry	Southwest Classic Trophy	81	42–36–3	Arkansas	Texas A&M won 3
Auburn	Florida	Auburn–Florida football rivalry	None	84	43–39–2	Auburn	Florida won 1
Auburn	Georgia	Deep South's Oldest Rivalry	None	129	65–56–8	Georgia	Georgia won 8
Auburn	LSU	Auburn–LSU football rivalry	None	58	30–24–1	LSU	LSU won 2
Auburn	Ole Miss	Auburn–Ole Miss football rivalry	None	48	35–12	Auburn	Ole Miss won 2
Auburn	Tennessee	Auburn–Tennessee football rivalry	None	54	29–22–3	Auburn	Auburn won 1
Florida	Georgia	Florida–Georgia football rivalry	Okefenokee Oar	102	56–44–2	Georgia	Georgia won 4
Florida	Kentucky	Florida–Kentucky football rivalry	None	75	54–21	Florida	Florida won 1
Florida	LSU	Florida–LSU football rivalry	None	71	34–31–3	Florida	Florida won 1
Florida	Tennessee	Florida–Tennessee football rivalry	None	54	32–22	Florida	Tennessee won 1
Georgia	South Carolina	Georgia–South Carolina football rivalry	None	76	55–19–2	Georgia	Georgia won 4
Georgia	Tennessee	Georgia–Tennessee football rivalry	None	54	29–23–2	Georgia	Georgia won 8
Georgia	Vanderbilt	Georgia–Vanderbilt football rivalry	None	83	61–20–2	Georgia	Georgia won 6
Kentucky	Tennessee	Kentucky–Tennessee football rivalry	Beer Barrel	120	84–26–9	Tennessee	Tennessee won 4
Kentucky	Vanderbilt	Kentucky–Vanderbilt football rivalry	None	97	48–44–4	Kentucky	Vanderbilt won 1
LSU	Mississippi State	LSU–Mississippi State football rivalry	None	117	75–36–3	LSU	LSU won 3
LSU	Ole Miss	Magnolia Bowl	Magnolia Bowl Trophy	113	64–42–4	LSU	LSU won 1
LSU	Texas A&M	LSU–Texas A&M football rivalry	None	63	32–24–3	LSU	Texas A&M won 1
Mississippi State	Ole Miss	Egg Bowl	Golden Egg	121	66–46–6	Ole Miss	Ole Miss won 2
Missouri	Oklahoma	Missouri–Oklahoma football rivalry	Tiger–Sooner Peace Pipe	97	67–25–5	Oklahoma	Missouri won 1
Missouri	South Carolina	Mayor's Cup	Mayor's Cup	15	9–6	Missouri	South Carolina won 1
Oklahoma	Texas	Red River Rivalry	Golden Hat Trophy	120	64–51–5	Texas	Texas won 1
Ole Miss	Vanderbilt	Ole Miss–Vanderbilt football rivalry	None	98	54–40–2	Ole Miss	Ole Miss won 5
South Carolina	Tennessee	South Carolina–Tennessee football rivalry	None	42	27–11–2	Tennessee	Tennessee won 1
Tennessee	Vanderbilt	Tennessee–Vanderbilt football rivalry	None	119	79–33–5	Tennessee	Tennessee won 6
Texas	Texas A&M	Texas–Texas A&M football rivalry	Cotton Holdings Trophy	119	77–37–5	Texas	Texas won 2

=== Interconference football rivalries ===
Teams		Rivalry name	Trophy	Meetings	Record	Series leader	Existing streak	Opposing conference
Alabama	Clemson	Alabama–Clemson football rivalry	None	19	14–5	Alabama	Alabama lost 1	ACC
Alabama	Georgia Tech	Alabama–Georgia Tech football rivalry	None	52	28–21–3	Alabama	Alabama lost 1	ACC
Alabama	Penn State	Alabama–Penn State football rivalry	None	15	10–5	Alabama	Alabama won 2	Big Ten
Arkansas	Texas Tech	Arkansas–Texas Tech football rivalry	None	38	30–8	Arkansas	Arkansas won 1	Big 12
Auburn	Clemson	Auburn–Clemson football rivalry	None	51	34–15–2	Auburn	Auburn lost 4	ACC
Auburn	Georgia Tech	Auburn–Georgia Tech football rivalry	None	92	47–41–4	Auburn	Auburn lost 2	ACC
Auburn	Tulane	Auburn–Tulane football rivalry	None	38	15–17–6	Tulane	Auburn won 2	AAC
Florida	Florida State	Sunshine Showdown	Makala Trophy, Florida Cup	68	38–28–2	Florida	Florida won 1	ACC
Florida	Miami (FL)	Florida–Miami football rivalry	Florida Cup	57	27–30	Miami (FL)	Florida lost 1	ACC
Georgia	Clemson	Clemson–Georgia football rivalry	None	66	44–18–4	Georgia	Georgia won 2	ACC
Georgia	Georgia Tech	Clean, Old-Fashioned Hate	The Governor's Cup	118	72–41–5	Georgia	Georgia won 7	ACC
Kentucky	Centre	Centre–Kentucky rivalry	None	35	12–21–2	Centre	Kentucky won 3	SAA (D-III)
Kentucky	Indiana	Indiana–Kentucky football rivalry	None	36	17–18–1	Indiana	Kentucky lost 1	Big Ten
Kentucky	Louisville	Governor's Cup	The Governor's Cup	36	19–16	Kentucky	Kentucky lost 1	ACC
Kentucky	Transylvania	Battle On Broadway	None	19	12–6–1	Kentucky	Kentucky lost 1	Program defunct since 1941
LSU	Tulane	Battle for the Rag	Tiger Rag/Victory Rag	98	69–22–7	LSU	LSU won 18	AAC
Missouri	Illinois	Arch Rivalry	None	24	17–7	Missouri	Missouri won 6	Big Ten
Missouri	Iowa State	Iowa State–Missouri football rivalry	Telephone Trophy	104	61–34–9	Missouri	Missouri won 5	Big 12
Missouri	Kansas	Border War	Indian War Drum	121	57–54–9	Missouri	Missouri won 3	Big 12
Missouri	Nebraska	Missouri–Nebraska football rivalry	Victory Bell	104	36–65–3	Nebraska	Missouri lost 2	Big Ten
Oklahoma	Nebraska	Nebraska–Oklahoma football rivalry	None	88	47–38–3	Oklahoma	Oklahoma won 3	Big Ten
Oklahoma	Oklahoma State	Bedlam Series	Bedlam Bell	118	91–20–7	Oklahoma	Oklahoma lost 1	Big 12
Ole Miss	Memphis	Mid-South Rivalry	None	63	47–12–2	Ole Miss	Ole Miss lost 1	AAC
Ole Miss	Tulane	Ole Miss–Tulane football rivalry	None	73	43–28	Ole Miss	Ole Miss won 13	AAC
South Carolina	Clemson	Palmetto Bowl	Palmetto Trophy	121	44–73–4	Clemson	South Carolina won 1	ACC
South Carolina	North Carolina	North Carolina–South Carolina football rivalry	None	60	20–36–4	North Carolina	South Carolina lost 1	ACC
Tennessee	Georgia Tech	Georgia Tech–Tennessee football rivalry	None	44	25–17–2	Tennessee	Tennessee won 2	ACC
Texas	Baylor	Baylor–Texas football rivalry	None	113	81–28–4	Texas	Texas won 2	Big 12
Texas	Rice	Rice–Texas football rivalry	None	97	75–21–1	Texas	Texas won 16	AAC
Texas	TCU	TCU–Texas football rivalry	None	94	65–28–1	Texas	Texas won 1	Big 12
Texas	Texas Tech	Texas–Texas Tech football rivalry	Chancellor's Spurs	73	55–18	Texas	Texas won 1	Big 12
Texas A&M	Baylor	Battle of the Brazos	None	108	68–31–9	Texas A&M	Texas A&M won 3	Big 12
Texas A&M	TCU	TCU–Texas A&M football rivalry	None	92	56–29–7	Texas A&M	Texas A&M won 24	Big 12
Texas A&M	Texas Tech	Texas A&M–Texas Tech football rivalry	None	70	37–32–1	Texas A&M	Texas A&M won 3	Big 12
Vanderbilt	Georgia Tech	Georgia Tech–Vanderbilt football rivalry	Gold Cowbell	39	16–20–3	Georgia Tech	Vanderbilt won 1	ACC
Vanderbilt	Sewanee	Sewanee–Vanderbilt football rivalry	None	52	40–8–4	Vanderbilt	Vanderbilt won 1	SAA (D-III)

== Men's basketball ==
For the current season, see 2025–26 Southeastern Conference men's basketball season.

Since the 2012–13 season, SEC teams have played an 18-game conference schedule, which includes two games (home and away) against each of three permanent rivals and single games against the remaining ten teams in the conference. Men's basketball formerly used the East/West divisional alignment for regular-season scheduling and seeding the conference tournament, but it no longer does.

Before expansion to 14 teams, the conference schedule was 16 games. Although the divisions were eliminated beginning with the 2011–12 season, that season's schedule was still set according to the divisional alignments, with each team facing each team from its own division twice and each team from the opposite division once. As part of the proposal by SEC head coaches that led to the scrapping of the divisional structure, a task force of four coaches and four athletic directors was set to discuss future conference scheduling. At that time, options included a revamped 16-game schedule, an 18-game schedule, or a full double round-robin of 22 conference games. However, these discussions came before Texas A&M and Missouri were announced in late 2011 as incoming members for the 2012–13 season, which required a format that could support 14 teams rather than twelve.

At the 2012 SEC spring meetings, league athletic directors adopted an 18-game conference schedule. Each school had one permanent opponent that it played home and away every season, and faced four other opponents in a home-and-home series during a given season, and then the remaining teams one each (four home, four away). The permanent opponents were Alabama–Auburn, Arkansas–Missouri, Florida–Kentucky, Georgia–South Carolina, LSU–Texas A&M, Ole Miss–Mississippi State, and Tennessee–Vanderbilt. The home-and-home opponents, apart from the permanent opponent, rotated each season.

The 2014 SEC spring meetings saw a further change to the scheduling format. While the athletic directors voted to stay with an 18-game conference schedule, they increased the number of permanent opponents for each school from one to three. Each school retained its permanent opponent from the 2012–2014 period while adding two others.

From 1966 to 1967, following Tulane's departure, through 1990–91, the year prior to the addition of Arkansas and South Carolina, teams played a double round-robin, 18-game conference schedule. No team was undefeated in this period, though three teams went 17–1 (Kentucky in 1970 and 1986, LSU in 1981; ironically, a loss to the Wildcats at Lexington in the regular season finale prevented the 1980–81 Tigers from an 18–0 conference record). During the period from 1992 to 2012 when the league slate was 16 games, Kentucky went undefeated in SEC play in 1996, 2003, and 2012 (although only the 2003 team went on to win the conference tournament).

Since the return to an 18-game conference schedule following the 2012 conference expansion, two teams have gone undefeated in SEC play: Florida in 2013–14 and Kentucky in 2014–15.

The scheduling format will change again with the arrival of Oklahoma and Texas in 2024. The conference schedule will remain at 18 games, but each team will play three opponents home and away—two permanent and one rotating. The remaining 12 games will be single games against all other conference members, evenly divided between home and away games.

=== Scheduling partners ===
The table below lists each school's permanent men's basketball-only scheduling partners starting with the 2024–2025 season.

School	Partner 1	Partner 2
Alabama	Auburn	Mississippi State
Arkansas	LSU	Missouri
Auburn	Alabama	Ole Miss
Florida	Georgia	South Carolina
Georgia	Florida	South Carolina
Kentucky	Tennessee	Vanderbilt
LSU	Arkansas	Texas A&M
Ole Miss	Auburn	Mississippi State
Mississippi State	Alabama	Ole Miss
Missouri	Arkansas	Oklahoma
Oklahoma	Missouri	Texas
South Carolina	Florida	Georgia
Tennessee	Kentucky	Vanderbilt
Texas	Oklahoma	Texas A&M
Texas A&M	LSU	Texas
Vanderbilt	Kentucky	Tennessee

=== National championships, Final Fours, and NCAA tournament appearances ===
Southeastern Conference basketball programs have combined to win 12 NCAA men's basketball championships as SEC members. Kentucky has won eight, Florida has won three, and Arkansas has won one national championship each as SEC members. Eleven teams have advanced to the Final Four at least once in their history. Nine SEC schools (Alabama, Arkansas, Florida, Kentucky, LSU, Missouri, Oklahoma, Tennessee, Texas) are among the national top 50 in all-time NCAA tournament appearances.

School	Men's NCAA Championships	Men's NCAA Runner-Up	Men's NCAA Final Fours	Men's NCAA Elite Eights	Men's NCAA Sweet Sixteens	Men's NCAA Tournament Appearances
Alabama			1 (2024)	3 (2004, 2024, 2025)	11 (1976, 1982, 1985, 1986, 1990, 1991, 2004, 2021, 2023–25)	25 (1975, 1976, 1982–86, 1989–92, 1994, 1995, 2002–06, 2012, 2018, 2021–25)
Arkansas	1 (1994)	1 (1995)	6 (1941, 1945, 1978, 1990, 1994, 1995)	11 (1941, 1945, 1949, 1978, 1979, 1990, 1991, 1994, 1995, 2021, 2022)	15 (1958, 1978, 1979, 1981, 1983, 1990, 1991, 1993–96, 2021–23, 2025)	36 (1941, 1945, 1949, 1958, 1977–85, 1988–91, 1992–96, 1998–2001, 2006–08, 2015, 2017, 2018, 2021–23, 2025)
Auburn			2 (2019, 2025)	3 (1986, 2019, 2025)	6 (1985, 1986, 1999, 2003, 2019, 2025)	14 (1984–88, 1999, 2000, 2003, 2018, 2019, 2022–25)
Florida	3 (2006, 2007, 2025)	1 (2000)	6 (1994, 2000, 2006, 2007, 2014, 2025)	10 (1994, 2000, 2006, 2007, 2011–14, 2017, 2025)	11 (1994, 1999, 2000, 2006, 2007, 2011–14, 2017, 2025)	23 (1989, 1994, 1995, 1999–2007, 2010–14, 2017–19, 2021, 2024, 2025)
Georgia			1 (1983)	1 (1983)	2 (1983, 1986)	11 (1983, 1987, 1990, 1991, 1996, 1997, 2001, 2008, 2011, 2015, 2025)
Kentucky	8 (1948, 1949, 1951, 1958, 1978, 1996, 1998, 2012)	4 (1966, 1975, 1997, 2014)	17 (1942, 1948, 1949, 1951, 1958, 1966, 1975, 1978, 1984, 1993, 1996–98, 2011, 2012, 2014, 2015)	38 (1942, 1945, 1948, 1949, 1951, 1952, 1956–58, 1961, 1962, 1966, 1968, 1970, 1972, 1973, 1975, 1977, 1978, 1983, 1984, 1986, 1992, 1993, 1995–99, 2003, 2005, 2010–12, 2014, 2015, 2017, 2019)	49 (1942, 1945, 1948, 1949, 1951, 1952, 1955–59, 1961, 1962, 1964, 1966, 1968–73, 1975, 1977, 1978, 1980, 1983–86, 1992, 1993, 1995–99, 2001–03, 2005, 2010–12, 2014, 2015, 2017–19, 2025)	62 (1942, 1945, 1948, 1949, 1951, 1952, 1955–59, 1961, 1962, 1964, 1966, 1968–73, 1975, 1977, 1978, 1980–87, 1992–2008, 2010–12, 2014–19, 2022–25)
LSU			4 (1953, 1981, 1986, 2006)	6 (1953, 1980, 1981, 1986, 1987, 2006)	10 (1953, 1954, 1979, 1980, 1981, 1986, 1987, 2000, 2006, 2019)	24 (1953, 1954, 1979–81, 1984–93, 2000, 2003, 2005, 2006, 2009, 2015, 2019, 2021, 2022)
Ole Miss					2 (2001, 2025)	10 (1981, 1997–99, 2001, 2002, 2013, 2015, 2019, 2025)
Mississippi State			1 (1996)	1 (1996)	1 (1963, 1995, 1996)	14 (1963, 1991, 1995, 1996, 2002–05, 2008, 2009, 2019, 2023–25)
Missouri				4 (1944, 1976, 2002, 2009)	6 (1976, 1980, 1982, 1989, 2002, 2009)	29 (1944, 1976, 1978, 1980–83, 1986–90, 1992, 1993, 1995, 1999–2003, 2009–12, 2013, 2018, 2021, 2023, 2025)
Oklahoma		2 (1947, 1988)	5 (1939, 1947, 1988, 2002, 2016)	9 (1939, 1943, 1947, 1985, 1988, 2002, 2003, 2009, 2016)	11 (1979, 1985, 1987–89, 1999, 2002, 2003, 2009, 2015, 2016)	34 (1939, 1943, 1947, 1979, 1983–90, 1992, 1995–2003, 2005, 2006, 2008, 2009, 2013–16, 2018, 2019, 2021, 2025)
South Carolina			1 (2017)	1 (2017)	4 (1971–73, 2017)	10 (1971–74, 1989, 1997, 1998, 2004, 2017, 2024)
Tennessee				3 (2010, 2024, 2025)	11 (1967, 1981, 2000, 2007, 2008, 2010, 2014, 2019, 2023–25)	27 (1967, 1976, 1977, 1979–83, 1989, 1998–2001, 2006–11, 2014, 2018, 2019, 2021–25)
Texas			3 (1943, 1947, 2003)	8 (1939, 1943, 1947, 1990, 2003, 2006, 2008, 2023)	11 (1960, 1963, 1972, 1990, 1997, 2002, 2003, 2004, 2006, 2008, 2023)	39 (1939, 1943, 1947, 1960, 1963, 1972, 1974, 1979, 1989–92, 1994–97, 1999–2012, 2014–16, 2018, 2021–24, 2025)
Texas A&M					6 (1951, 1969, 1980, 2007, 2016, 2018)	17 (1951, 1964, 1969, 1975, 1980, 1987, 2006–11, 2016, 2018, 2023–25)
Vanderbilt				1 (1965)	6 (1965, 1974, 1988, 1993, 2004, 2007)	16 (1965, 1974, 1988, 1989, 1991, 1993, 1997, 2004, 2007, 2008, 2010, 2011, 2012, 2016, 2017, 2025)

Seasons are listed by the calendar years in which they ended. Italics indicate honors earned before the school competed in the SEC.

=== Basketball tournament ===
The SEC men's basketball tournament (also known simply as the SEC tournament) is the competition that determines the SEC's automatic bid to the NCAA men's basketball tournament. Notably, it does not determine the SEC conference champion in men's basketball—the conference has awarded its championship to the team(s) with the best regular-season record since the 1950–51 season. It is a single-elimination tournament and seeding is based on regular season records.

With the expansion to 14 members in 2012, the 2013 tournament was the first with a new format covering five days. The teams seeded eleven through fourteen play on the first day, with the winners advancing to play the No. 5 and No. 6 seeds on Thursday. The top four teams receive a "double bye" and do not play until the quarterfinals on Friday. The expansion to 16 teams in 2024 will result in two additional tournament games, but the top four teams will continue to receive "double byes" into the quarterfinals.

As of the 2022–23 season, the tournament has most often been held at two venues that have each hosted twelve times. Louisville Gardens in Louisville, Kentucky, served as the regular host from 1941 until the tournament was discontinued after the 1952 edition. The Georgia Dome in Atlanta first hosted the tournament in 1995 and most recently hosted in 2014. Bridgestone Arena in Nashville, Tennessee, is now the regular host, with that venue hosting the tournament from 2015 through 2030, except in 2018 and 2022 (years in which it instead hosted the SEC women's basketball tournament). Sometimes, the tournament will take place at the Smoothie King Center in New Orleans, or Benchmark International Arena in Tampa, Florida. The 2018 tournament was held at Scottrade Center, now Enterprise Center, in St. Louis, Missouri, and the 2022 tournament was at Amalie Arena.

Prior to moving to the Georgia Dome, the tournament (during its modern, post-1979 era) was most often contested at the venue now known as Legacy Arena in Birmingham, Alabama, home of the SEC's headquarters and centrally located prior to the addition of Arkansas and South Carolina. Other sites to host include on-campus arenas at LSU, Tennessee, and Vanderbilt; Rupp Arena in Lexington; and the Orlando Arena.

=== NCAA tournament champions, runners-up and locations ===
† denotes overtime games. Multiple †'s indicate more than one overtime.

Year	Champion		Runner-up		Venue and city	
1947	Holy Cross	58	Oklahoma	47	Madison Square Garden	New York City, New York
1948	Kentucky	58	Baylor	42	Madison Square Garden	New York City, New York
1949	Kentucky (2)	46	Oklahoma A&M	36	Hec Edmundson Pavilion	Seattle, Washington
1951	Kentucky (3)	68	Kansas State	58	Williams Arena	Minneapolis, Minnesota
1958	Kentucky (4)	84	Seattle	72	Freedom Hall	Louisville, Kentucky
1966	Texas Western	72	Kentucky	65	Cole Field House	College Park, Maryland
1975	UCLA (10)	92	Kentucky	85	San Diego Sports Arena	San Diego, California
1978	Kentucky (5)	94	Duke	88	The Checkerdome	St. Louis, Missouri
1988	Kansas (2)	83	Oklahoma	79	Kemper Arena	Kansas City, Missouri
1994	Arkansas	76	Duke	72	Charlotte Coliseum	Charlotte, North Carolina
1995	UCLA (11)	89	Arkansas	78	Kingdome	Seattle, Washington
1996	Kentucky (6)	76	Syracuse	67	Continental Airlines Arena	East Rutherford, New Jersey
1997†	Arizona	84	Kentucky	79	RCA Dome	Indianapolis, Indiana
1998	Kentucky (7)	78	Utah	69	Alamodome	San Antonio, Texas
2000	Michigan State (2)	89	Florida	76	RCA Dome	Indianapolis, Indiana
2006	Florida	73	UCLA	57	RCA Dome	Indianapolis, Indiana
2007	Florida (2)	84	Ohio State	75	Georgia Dome	Atlanta, Georgia
2012	Kentucky (8)	67	Kansas	59	Mercedes-Benz Superdome	New Orleans, Louisiana
2014	UConn (4)	60	Kentucky	54	AT&T Stadium	Arlington, Texas
2025	Florida (3)	65	Houston	63	Alamodome	San Antonio, Texas

=== Awards ===
The SEC Men's Basketball Player of the Year is awarded to the player who has proven himself, throughout the season, to be the most exceptional talent in the Southeastern Conference. Various other awards, such as the best tournament player in the SEC tournament and all conference honors are given out throughout the year.

== Baseball ==
Starting in 2025 with the addition of Oklahoma and Texas, schools play a 30–game league schedule (10 three-game series), with two permanent opponents and eight rotating opponents. Between 1996 and 2012, the SEC consisted of two divisions, where schools played all five teams within their division and five schools from the opposite division, resulting in only one missed opponent in any given season. From 2012 to 2024, with the addition of Missouri and Texas A&M, schedules consisted of games played against all six other divisional opponents and four opponents from the opposite division, meaning three missed opponents in a given season.

Since 1990, the SEC has become the most successful conference on the college baseball diamond. That year, Georgia captured the conference's first national championship at the Men's College World Series (MCWS). Following that, LSU won six of the next 19 titles, including five of ten between 1991 and 2000 and its sixth title in 2009. This was followed by South Carolina winning back-to-back titles in 2010 and 2011, Vanderbilt winning its first title in 2014, Florida winning its first title in 2017, Vanderbilt winning again in 2019, Mississippi State claiming its first title in 2021, Ole Miss winning its first title in 2022, LSU winning again in 2023, Tennessee winning its first title in 2024, LSU winning again in 2025, and Oklahoma claiming the 2026 title. During that same span, 13 teams have also been runners-up at the MCWS. The MCWS final series featured two SEC teams in 1997, 2011, 2017, 2021, 2023, and 2024, and the 2022 final involved a current member and a future member. (Note: For this purpose, "future member" is defined as a school that, at the time of the relevant MCWS, was confirmed to be joining the SEC in the future. Oklahoma and Texas combined for 49 MCWS appearances through 2022, but their 2022 appearances were their first after the SEC announced both as future members.) The 2022 MCWS featured four current members, all from the SEC West, plus both future members, and the 2026 MCWS featured five current members. Every current member has appeared at least 5 times except Kentucky, which made its first MCWS appearance in 2024. The only pre-2024 SEC member that has not appeared in the MCWS as an SEC member is Missouri, which has yet to make the NCAA tournament as an SEC member, although it made six MCWS appearances in the 1950s and 1960s while in the Big Eight Conference. Both Georgia Tech and Tulane have made appearances in the MCWS after leaving the SEC. One of the two newest SEC members, Texas, leads all schools in MCWS appearances with 38, and its 6 titles trail only Southern California (12 titles) and LSU (8). The other new member, Oklahoma, had two titles from 11 MCWS appearances before joining the SEC, and won its third title in its first MCWS appearance as an SEC member in 2026.

SEC teams have also become leaders in total and average attendance over the years. In 2022, the top seven programs in average home attendance and the top eight programs in total home attendance were all SEC members, with the exception of future SEC member Texas. The only SEC members to place outside the top 30 in both measures of attendance were Kentucky and Missouri, with the latter being the only one outside the top 50.

The NCAA automatic berth is given to the winner of the SEC Baseball Tournament, which was first started in 1977. The 2025 tournament, the first after the addition of Oklahoma and Texas, was the first to include all conference members, and also the first to use a single-elimination format throughout. Previously, at least some rounds used a double-elimination format. Regardless of the format, seeding is based on regular-season records. Since 1998, the tournament has been held at Hoover Metropolitan Stadium in Hoover, Alabama. The winner receives the conference's automatic bid to the NCAA Division I baseball tournament.

SEC presidents and athletic directors voted to expand the SEC Tournament to ten teams starting in 2012. The division winners received a bye on the first day of competition, and the tournament became single-elimination after the field is pared to four teams.

With the addition of Missouri and Texas A&M for the 2013 baseball season, the tournament was expanded to 12 teams. The top four seeds receive a bye on the first day, with seeds 5–12 playing single elimination. The tournament is double-elimination for the next three days, then reverts to single elimination when four teams are remaining.

Because of the arrival of Oklahoma and Texas for the 2025 baseball season, the tournament was expanded to a 16-team, single elimination tournament. The top 4 seeds earn a double-bye to the quarterfinals, and seeds 5–8 earn a bye to the second round.

In addition to the winner of the SEC Baseball Tournament, the Southeastern Conference usually gets several at-large bids to the NCAA tournament. Many teams have qualified for the NCAA tournament despite failing to win a game in the SEC Tournament. Four of these reached the MCWS despite going winless in the SEC Tournament — Mississippi State in 2007 and 2021 (0–2 both times), Texas A&M in 2024 (0–2), and Oklahoma in 2026 (0–1). Texas A&M reached the MCWS championship series, Mississippi State won the 2021 MCWS, and Oklahoma won the 2026 MCWS.

=== National championships, Men's College World Series, and NCAA tournament appearances ===
Southeastern Conference baseball programs have combined to win 18 NCAA baseball championships as SEC members. LSU has won eight, South Carolina and Vanderbilt have won two, and Florida, Georgia, Oklahoma, Ole Miss, Mississippi State and Tennessee have won one national championship each as SEC members. Texas has won six, Oklahoma has won two, and Missouri has won one championship prior to joining the SEC. Every SEC team has advanced to the Men's College World Series at least once in its history, and only Kentucky has made fewer than five MCWS appearances. Twelve SEC schools (Alabama, Arkansas, Auburn, Florida, LSU, Mississippi State, Missouri, South Carolina, Oklahoma, Texas, Texas A&M, Vanderbilt) are among the national top 50 in all-time NCAA tournament appearances.

School	NCAA Championships	NCAA Runner-Up	NCAA Men's College World Series Appearances	NCAA Regional Champions	NCAA Tournament Appearances
Alabama		**2** (1983, 1997)	**6** (1950, 1983, 1996, 1997, 1999, 2026)	**9** (1950, 1983, 1996, 1997, 1999, 2006, 2010, 2023, 2026)	**27** (1950, 1955, 1968, 1983, 1986, 1991, 1995–2000, 2002, 2003, 2005, 2006, 2008–11, 2013, 2014, 2021, 2023–26)
Arkansas		**2** (1979, 2018)	**12** (1979, 1985, 1987, 1989, 2004, 2009, 2012, 2015, 2018, 2019, 2022, 2025)	**15** (1979, 1985, 1987, 1989, 2002, 2004, 2009, 2010, 2012, 2015, 2018, 2019, 2021, 2022, 2025)	**37** (1973, 1979, 1980, 1983, 1985–90, 1995, 1996, 1998, 1999, 2002–15, 2017–19, 2021–26)
Auburn			**6** (1967, 1976, 1994, 1997, 2019, 2022)	**9** (1976, 1994, 1997, 1999, 2018, 2019, 2022, 2025, 2026)	**26** (1963, 1967, 1976, 1978, 1987, 1989, 1993–95, 1997–2003, 2005, 2010, 2015, 2017–19, 2022, 2023, 2025, 2026)
Florida	**1** (2017)	**3** (2005, 2011, 2023)	**14** (1988, 1991, 1996, 1998, 2005, 2010–12, 2015–18, 2023, 2024)	**16** (1988, 1991, 1996, 1998, 2004, 2005, 2009–12, 2015–18, 2023, 2024)	**41** (1958, 1960, 1962, 1977, 1979, 1981, 1982, 1984, 1985, 1988, 1989, 1991, 1992, 1994, 1996–98, 2000–05, 2008–19, 2021–26)
Georgia	**1** (1990)	**1** (2008)	**7** (1987, 1990, 2001, 2004, 2006, 2008, 2026)	**8** (1987, 1990, 2001, 2004, 2006, 2008, 2024, 2026)	**18** (1953, 1954, 1987, 1990, 1992, 2001, 2002, 2004, 2006, 2008, 2009, 2011, 2018, 2019, 2022, 2024–2026)
Kentucky			**1** (2024)	**3** (2017, 2023, 2024)	**11** (1988, 1993, 2006, 2008, 2012, 2014, 2017, 2023–26)
LSU	**8** (1991, 1993, 1996, 1997, 2000, 2009, 2023, 2025)	**1** (2017)	**20** (1986, 1987, 1989–91, 1993, 1994, 1996–98, 2000, 2003, 2004, 2008, 2009, 2013, 2015, 2017, 2023, 2025)	**27** (1986, 1987, 1989–91, 1993, 1994, 1996–2004, 2008, 2009, 2012, 2013, 2015–17, 2019, 2021, 2023, 2025)	**50** (1975, 1985–87, 1989–2005, 2008–10, 2012–19, 2021–25)
Mississippi	**1** (2022)		**7** (1956, 1964, 1969, 1972, 2014, 2022, 2026)	**9** (2005–07, 2009, 2014, 2019, 2021, 2022, 2026)	**27** (1956, 1964, 1969, 1972, 1977, 1995, 1999, 2001, 2003–10, 2012–16, 2018, 2019, 2021, 2022, 2025, 2026)
Mississippi State	**1** (2021)	**1** (2013)	**12** (1971, 1979, 1981, 1985, 1990, 1997, 1998, 2007, 2013, 2018, 2019, 2021)	**17** (1979, 1981, 1985, 1990, 1997, 1998, 2000, 2001, 2007, 2011, 2013, 2016–19, 2021, 2026)	**40** (1965, 1966, 1970, 1971, 1978, 1979, 1981, 1983–85, 1987–93, 1996–2001, 2003–07, 2011–14, 2016–19, 2021, 2024–2026)
Missouri	**1** (1954)	**3** (1952, 1958, 1964)	**6** (1952, 1954, 1958, 1962, 1963, 1964)	**1** (2006)	**22** (1952, 1954, 1958, 1962–65, 1976, 1978, 1980, 1981, 1988, 1991, 1996, 2003–09, 2012)
Oklahoma	**3** (1951, 1994, 2026)	**1** (2022)	**12** (1951, 1972–76, 1992, 1994, 1995, 2010, 2022, 2026)	**11** (1975, 1976, 1992, 1994, 1995, 2006, 2010, 2012, 2013, 2022, 2026)	**42** (1947, 1951, 1955, 1956, 1972–77, 1979, 1982, 1984–89, 1991, 1992, 1994, 1995, 1997, 1998, 2000, 2002, 2004–06, 2008–13, 2017, 2018, 2022–2024, 2025, 2026)
South Carolina	**2** (2010, 2011)	**4** (1975, 1977, 2002, 2012)	**11** (1975, 1977, 1981, 1982, 1985, 2002–04, 2010–12)	**19** (1975, 1977, 1981, 1982, 1985, 2000–04, 2006, 2007, 2010–13, 2016, 2018, 2023)	**35** (1974–77, 1980–86, 1988, 1992, 1993, 1998, 2000–14, 2016, 2018, 2021, 2023, 2024)
Tennessee	**1** (2024)	**1** (1951)	**7** (1951, 1995, 2001, 2005, 2021, 2023, 2024)	**8** (1995, 2001, 2005, 2021–25)	**16** (1951, 1993–97, 2001, 2004, 2005, 2019, 2021–26)
Texas	**6** (1949, 1950, 1975, 1983, 2002, 2005)	**6** (1953, 1984, 1985, 1989, 2004, 2009)	**39** (1949, 1950, 1952, 1953, 1957, 1961–63, 1965, 1966, 1968–70, 1972–75, 1979, 1981–85, 1987, 1989, 1992, 1993, 2000, 2002–05, 2009, 2011, 2014, 2018, 2021, 2022, 2026)	**25** (1975, 1979, 1981–85, 1987, 1989, 1992, 1993, 2000, 2002–05, 2009–11, 2014, 2018, 2021–23, 2026)	**65** (1947, 1949, 1950, 1952–54, 1957, 1958, 1960–63, 1965–76, 1979–96, 1999–2008, 2009–11, 2014, 2015, 2017, 2018, 2021–24, 2025, 2026)
Texas A&M		**1** (2024)	**8** (1951, 1964, 1993, 1999, 2011, 2017, 2022, 2024)	**11** (1993, 1999, 2004, 2007, 2008, 2011, 2015–17, 2022, 2024)	**39** (1951, 1955, 1959, 1964, 1975–78, 1984, 1986–89, 1991–93, 1995, 1997–99, 2003, 2004, 2007–12, 2013–19, 2022–24, 2026)
Vanderbilt	**2** (2014, 2019)	**2** (2015, 2021)	**5** (2011, 2014, 2015, 2019, 2021)	**10** (2004, 2010, 2011, 2013–15, 2017–19, 2021)	**23** (1973, 1974, 1980, 2004, 2006–19, 2021–25)

Seasons are listed by the calendar years in which they ended. Italics indicate honors earned before the school competed in the SEC.

=== Men's College World Series champions, runners-up, and scores ===
Note: Teams in bold are current SEC members who advanced to the MCWS while in the conference. Teams in bold italics are current SEC members who were either in another conference or an independent at the time of their appearance.

Year	Champion	Runner-up	Score(s)	Venue	
1949	**Texas**	Wake Forest	10–3	Lawrence–Dumont Stadium	Wichita, Kansas
1950	**Texas** (2)	Washington State	3–0	Rosenblatt Stadium	Omaha, Nebraska
1951	**Oklahoma**	**Tennessee**	3–2	Rosenblatt Stadium	Omaha, Nebraska
1952	Holy Cross	**Missouri**	7–3, 8–4	Rosenblatt Stadium	Omaha, Nebraska
1953	Michigan	**Texas**	7–5	Rosenblatt Stadium	Omaha, Nebraska
1954	**Missouri**	Rollins	4–1	Rosenblatt Stadium	Omaha, Nebraska
1958	Southern California (2)	**Missouri**	7–0, 8–7 (12)	Rosenblatt Stadium	Omaha, Nebraska
1964	Minnesota (3)	**Missouri**	5–1	Rosenblatt Stadium	Omaha, Nebraska
1975	**Texas** (3)	**South Carolina**	5–1	Rosenblatt Stadium	Omaha, Nebraska
1977	Arizona State (4)	**South Carolina**	2–1	Rosenblatt Stadium	Omaha, Nebraska
1979	Cal State Fullerton	**Arkansas**	2–1	Rosenblatt Stadium	Omaha, Nebraska
1983	**Texas** (4)	**Alabama**	4–3	Rosenblatt Stadium	Omaha, Nebraska
1984	Cal State Fullerton (2)	**Texas**	3–1	Rosenblatt Stadium	Omaha, Nebraska
1985	Miami (FL) (2)	**Texas**	2–1, 10–6	Rosenblatt Stadium	Omaha, Nebraska
1989	Wichita State	**Texas**	5–3	Rosenblatt Stadium	Omaha, Nebraska
1990	**Georgia**	Oklahoma State	2–1	Rosenblatt Stadium	Omaha, Nebraska
1991	**LSU**	Wichita State	6–3	Rosenblatt Stadium	Omaha, Nebraska
1993	**LSU** (2)	Wichita State	8–0	Rosenblatt Stadium	Omaha, Nebraska
1994	**Oklahoma** (2)	Georgia Tech	13–5	Rosenblatt Stadium	Omaha, Nebraska
1996	**LSU** (3)	Miami (FL)	9–8	Rosenblatt Stadium	Omaha, Nebraska
1997	**LSU** (4)	**Alabama**	13–6	Rosenblatt Stadium	Omaha, Nebraska
2000	**LSU** (5)	Stanford	6–5	Rosenblatt Stadium	Omaha, Nebraska
2002	**Texas** (5)	**South Carolina**	12–6	Rosenblatt Stadium	Omaha, Nebraska
2004	Cal State Fullerton (4)	**Texas**	6–4, 3–2	Rosenblatt Stadium	Omaha, Nebraska
2005	**Texas** (6)	**Florida**	4–2, 6–2	Rosenblatt Stadium	Omaha, Nebraska
2008	Fresno State	**Georgia**	6–7, 19–10, 6–1	Rosenblatt Stadium	Omaha, Nebraska
2009	**LSU** (6)	**Texas**	7–6 (11), 1–5, 11–4	Rosenblatt Stadium	Omaha, Nebraska
2010	**South Carolina**	UCLA	7–1, 2–1 (11)	Rosenblatt Stadium	Omaha, Nebraska
2011	**South Carolina** (2)	**Florida**	2–1 (11), 5–2	TD Ameritrade Park Omaha	Omaha, Nebraska
2012	Arizona (4)	**South Carolina**	5–1, 4–1	TD Ameritrade Park Omaha	Omaha, Nebraska
2013	UCLA	**Mississippi State**	3–1, 8–0	TD Ameritrade Park Omaha	Omaha, Nebraska
2014	**Vanderbilt**	Virginia	9–8, 2–7, 3–2	TD Ameritrade Park Omaha	Omaha, Nebraska
2015	Virginia	**Vanderbilt**	1–5, 3–0, 4–2	TD Ameritrade Park Omaha	Omaha, Nebraska
2017	**Florida**	**LSU**	4–3, 6–1	TD Ameritrade Park Omaha	Omaha, Nebraska
2018	Oregon State (3)	**Arkansas**	1–4, 5–3, 5–0	TD Ameritrade Park Omaha	Omaha, Nebraska
2019	**Vanderbilt** (2)	Michigan	4–7, 4–1, 8–2	TD Ameritrade Park Omaha	Omaha, Nebraska
2021	**Mississippi State**	**Vanderbilt**	2–8, 13–2, 9–0	TD Ameritrade Park Omaha	Omaha, Nebraska
2022	**Ole Miss**	**Oklahoma**	10–3, 4–2	Charles Schwab Field Omaha	Omaha, Nebraska
2023	**LSU** (7)	**Florida**	4–3 (11), 4–24, 18–4	Charles Schwab Field Omaha	Omaha, Nebraska
2024	**Tennessee**	**Texas A&M**	5–9, 4–1, 6–5	Charles Schwab Field Omaha	Omaha, Nebraska
2025	**LSU** (8)	Coastal Carolina	1–0, 5–3	Charles Schwab Field Omaha	Omaha, Nebraska
2026	**Oklahoma** (3)	North Carolina	9–3, 2–6, 13–2	Charles Schwab Field Omaha	Omaha, Nebraska

=== Rivalries ===
Several baseball rivalries have developed in the SEC:

- LSU–Tulane

Historically these schools were arch-rivals in all sports, but following Tulane's decades-long de-emphasis of sports, including its exit from the SEC in 1966, baseball is the only sport in which the two schools are relatively evenly matched. On several occasions match-ups between the two have drawn national record-setting attendances. Tulane reached its first College World Series in 2001 by defeating LSU in three games in the NCAA Super Regional. In 2002, the Tigers and Green Wave drew an NCAA regular season record crowd of 27,673 to the Louisiana Superdome.

- LSU–Mississippi State

Before the arrival of Skip Bertman as LSU's baseball coach in 1984, Mississippi State had long dominated the conference in baseball, with most of that success coming under coach Ron Polk, who returned to coach the Bulldogs in 2002 after retiring in 1997. When Bertman arrived in Baton Rouge, LSU's long-dormant program took off, winning eleven SEC championships and five College World Series championships between 1984 and 2001.

- South Carolina–Clemson

This instate rivalry is an intense local affair, with the Gamecocks and Tigers meeting each regular season, and has gained national prominence as both teams are often ranked in the top ten nationally. The highlights of the rivalry include the 2002 and 2010 meetings in the final four of the College World Series. Each time, South Carolina emerged from the losers bracket to beat Clemson twice and advance to the national championship series.

- South Carolina–North Carolina

The Gamecocks and Tar Heels met five times in the NCAA tournament between 2002 and 2013, including the 2002 NCAA Regional, 2003 NCAA Super Regional, 2004 NCAA Regional and 2013 NCAA Regional, with the Gamecocks holding a 3–2 edge.

== Women's basketball ==
The SEC has historically been a strong conference in women's basketball. Since the 2009–10 season, teams have played a 16-game conference schedule with a single league table; prior to that time the conference schedule was 14 games, again in a single table. Like SEC men's basketball, women's basketball used the divisional alignment for scheduling purposes through the 2011–12 season; however, the women's scheduling format was significantly different from the men's. Each team played home-and-home games against five schools—one permanent opponent, two teams from the same division, and two teams from the opposite division; the non-permanent home-and-home opponents rotated every two years. The remaining games were single games against the six other schools in the conference, with three at home and three away.

The league voted to keep a 16-game league schedule even after the addition of Missouri and Texas A&M. Arkansas and LSU are no longer permanent opponents, with the Razorbacks picking up Missouri and the Lady Tigers picking up Texas A&M. The other permanent opponents are the same as men's basketball, except for Florida-Georgia and Kentucky-South Carolina (both pairs had been permanent women's basketball opponents before the 2012 expansion). Each school plays two others home-and-home during a given season and the other ten once each. The divisional alignments no longer play any role in scheduling.

The conference schedule will remain at 16 games after the 2024 arrival of Oklahoma and Texas. Each team will play home and away against one permanent opponent, with single games against all other teams, evenly divided between home and away games.

SEC women's basketball was historically dominated by Tennessee, who won regular-season and/or conference tournament championships in 25 seasons through 2015, as well as eight national championships since 1987. In more recent times, the dominant team has been South Carolina, winning eight regular-season and eight tournament titles since 2014, as well as national titles in 2017, 2022 and 2024. In the 28 seasons the NCAA Division I women's basketball tournament has been held, SEC schools have reached the Final Four 32 times, more than twice as often as any other conference.

=== National championships, Final Fours, and NCAA tournament appearances ===
Southeastern Conference basketball programs have combined to win 12 NCAA women's basketball championships as SEC members. Tennessee has won eight, South Carolina has won three, and LSU has won one national championship each as SEC members. Texas and Texas A&M have won championships prior to joining the conference. Twelve teams have advanced to the Final Four at least once in their history. Eleven SEC schools (Auburn, Georgia, Kentucky, LSU, Ole Miss, Oklahoma, South Carolina, Tennessee, Texas, Texas A&M, and Vanderbilt) are among the national top 50 in all-time NCAA tournament appearances.

School	Women's NCAA Championships	Women's NCAA Runner-Up	Women's NCAA Final Fours	Women's NCAA Elite Eights	Women's NCAA Sweet Sixteens	Women's NCAA Tournament Appearances
Alabama			**1** (1994)	**1** (1994)	**6** (1984, 1994–98)	**14** (1984, 1988, 1992–99, 2021–25)
Arkansas			**1** (1998)	**2** (1990, 1998)	**3** (1990, 1991, 1998)	**9** (1990, 1991, 1995, 1998, 2001–03, 2012, 2015)
Auburn		**3** (1988–90)	**3** (1988–90)	**6** (1987–91, 1996)	**7** (1986–91, 1996)	**22** (1982, 1983, 1985–91, 1993, 1994, 1996, 1997, 1999, 2000, 2004, 2008, 2009, 2016, 2017, 2019, 2024)
Florida				**1** (1997)	**2** (1997, 1998)	**16** (1993–99, 2001, 2002, 2004, 2006, 2009, 2012, 2014, 2016, 2022)
Georgia		**2** (1985, 1996)	**5** (1983, 1985, 1995, 1996, 1999)	**11** (1983–85, 1991, 1995–97, 1999, 2000, 2004, 2013)	**20** (1983–88, 1991, 1995–97, 1999, 2000, 2003–07, 2010, 2011, 2013)	**36** (1982–91, 1993, 1995–2014, 2016, 2018, 2021–23)
Kentucky				**4** (1982, 2010, 2012, 2013)	**6** (1982, 2010, 2012–14, 2016)	**18** (1982, 1983, 1986, 1991, 1999, 2006, 2010–17, 2019, 2021, 2022, 2025)
LSU	**1** (2023)		**6** (2004–08, 2023)	**11** (1986, 2000, 2003–08, 2023–25)	**17** (1984, 1986, 1989, 1997, 1999, 2000, 2003–08, 2013, 2014, 2023–25)	**30** (1984, 1986–91, 1997, 1999–2010, 2012–15, 2017, 2018, 2022–25)
Ole Miss				**5** (1985, 1986, 1989, 1992, 2007)	**12** (1983–90, 1992, 2007, 2023, 2025)	**21** (1982–92, 1994–96, 2004, 2005, 2007, 2022–25)
Mississippi State		**2** (2017, 2018)	**2** (2017, 2018)	**3** (2017–19)	**5** (2010, 2016–19)	**13** (1999, 2000, 2002, 2003, 2009, 2010, 2015–19, 2023, 2025)
Missouri					**2** (1982, 2001)	**13** (1982–86, 1994, 2001, 2004, 2006, 2016–19)
Oklahoma		**1** (2002)	**3** (2002, 2009, 2010)	**3** (2002, 2009, 2010)	**11** (1986, 2000–02, 2006, 2007, 2009–11, 2013, 2025)	**25** (1986, 1995, 2000–18, 2022–24, 2025)
South Carolina	**3** (2017, 2022, 2024)	**2** (2025, 2026)	**8** (2015, 2017, 2021–26)	**10** (2002, 2015, 2017, 2018, 2021–26)	**16** (1982, 1990, 2002, 2012, 2014–19, 2021–26)	**22** (1982, 1986, 1988–91, 2002, 2003, 2012–19, 2021–26)
Tennessee	**8** (1987, 1989, 1991, 1996–98, 2007, 2008)	**5** (1984, 1995, 2000, 2003, 2004)	**18** (1982, 1984, 1986–89, 1991, 1995–98, 2000, 2002–05, 2007, 2008)	**28** (1982–84, 1986–91, 1993, 1995–2000, 2002–08, 2011–13, 2015, 2016)	**37** (1982–2008, 2010–16, 2022, 2023, 2025)	**43** (1982–2019, 2021–25)
Texas	**1** (1986)		**4** (1986, 1987, 2003, 2025)	**13** (1983, 1984, 1986–90, 2003, 2016, 2021, 2022, 2024, 2025)	**19** (1983–90, 2002–04, 2015–18, 2021, 2022, 2024, 2025)	**37** (1983–94, 1996, 1997, 1999–2005, 2008–12, 2014–19, 2021–24, 2025)
Texas A&M	**1** (2011)		**1** (2011)	**3** (2008, 2011, 2014)	**9** (1994, 2008, 2009, 2011, 2012, 2014, 2018, 2019, 2021)	**18** (1994, 1996, 2006–11, 2012–19, 2021, 2024)
Vanderbilt			**1** (1993)	**5** (1992, 1993, 1996, 2001, 2002)	**14** (1990–97, 2001, 2002, 2004, 2005, 2008, 2009)	**29** (1986, 1987, 1989–98, 2000–14, 2024, 2025)

Seasons are listed by the calendar years in which they ended. Italics indicate honors earned before the school competed in the SEC.

=== Basketball tournament ===
The SEC women's basketball tournament is currently held a week before the men's basketball tournament. Like the men's version, it is a single-elimination tournament involving all conference members, with seeding based on regular season records. With the expansion to 14 schools, the bottom four teams in the conference standings play opening-round games, and the top four receive "double byes" into the quarterfinals. The winner earns the conference's automatic bid to the NCAA women's basketball tournament. Also paralleling the men's tournament, the women's tournament does not determine the SEC champion; that honor has been awarded based on regular-season record since the 1985–86 season. The expansion to 16 teams will result in the addition of two extra games, but the top four teams in the conference standings will continue to receive "double byes" into the quarterfinals.

The tournament, inaugurated in 1980, was originally held on campus sites; the first tournament to take place at a neutral site was in 1987. The three most frequent sites for the tournament have been McKenzie Arena in Chattanooga, Tennessee (seven times), the Albany Civic Center in Albany, Georgia (six times), and Bridgestone Arena in Nashville (six times). However, the only one of these venues to have hosted the tournament in the 21st century is Bridgestone Arena. Because demand for women's tournament tickets is generally lower than for the men's tournament, it is typically played in a smaller venue than the men's tournament in the same season. The most frequent venues since 2000 have been Bridgestone Arena, Gas South Arena at Duluth, Georgia (four), and Simmons Bank Arena in North Little Rock, Arkansas (four).

=== NCAA tournament champions, runners-up and locations ===
† denotes overtime games. Multiple †'s indicate more than one overtime.

Teams in bold represented the SEC at the time of their championship appearance. Teams in bold italics made their appearances before joining the SEC.

Year	Champion		Runner-up		Venue and city	
1984	USC (2)	72	**Tennessee**	61	Pauley Pavilion	Los Angeles, California
1985	Old Dominion	70	**Georgia**	65	Frank Erwin Center	Austin, Texas
1986	**Texas**	97	USC	81	Rupp Arena	Lexington, Kentucky
1987	**Tennessee**	67	Louisiana Tech	44	Frank Erwin Center	Austin, Texas
1988	Louisiana Tech (2)	56	**Auburn**	54	Tacoma Dome	Tacoma, Washington
1989	**Tennessee** (2)	76	**Auburn**	70	Tacoma Dome	Tacoma, Washington
1990	Stanford	88	**Auburn**	81	Thompson–Boling Arena	Knoxville, Tennessee
1991†	**Tennessee** (3)	70	Virginia	67	Lakefront Arena	New Orleans, Louisiana
1995	Connecticut	70	**Tennessee**	64	Target Center	Minneapolis, Minnesota
1996	**Tennessee** (4)	83	**Georgia**	65	Charlotte Coliseum	Charlotte, North Carolina
1997	**Tennessee** (5)	68	Old Dominion	59	Riverfront Coliseum	Cincinnati, Ohio
1998	**Tennessee** (6)	93	Louisiana Tech	75	Kemper Arena	Kansas City, Missouri
2000	Connecticut (2)	71	**Tennessee**	52	First Union Center	Philadelphia, Pennsylvania
2003	Connecticut (4)	73	**Tennessee**	68	Georgia Dome	Atlanta, Georgia
2004	Connecticut (5)	70	**Tennessee**	61	New Orleans Arena	New Orleans, Louisiana
2007	**Tennessee** (7)	59	Rutgers	46	Quicken Loans Arena	Cleveland, Ohio
2008	**Tennessee** (8)	64	Stanford	48	St. Pete Times Forum	Tampa, Florida
2011	**Texas A&M**	76	Notre Dame	70	Conseco Fieldhouse	Indianapolis, Indiana
2017	**South Carolina**	67	**Mississippi State**	55	American Airlines Center	Dallas, Texas
2018	Notre Dame	61	**Mississippi State**	58	Nationwide Arena	Columbus, Ohio
2022	**South Carolina** (2)	64	UConn	49	Target Center	Minneapolis, Minnesota
2023	**LSU**	102	Iowa	85	American Airlines Center	Dallas, Texas
2024	**South Carolina** (3)	87	Iowa	75	Rocket Mortgage FieldHouse	Cleveland, Ohio
2025	UConn (12)	82	**South Carolina**	59	Amalie Arena	Tampa, Florida
2026	UCLA	79	**South Carolina**	51	Mortgage Matchup Center	Phoenix, Arizona

=== Rivalries ===
- Tennessee–UConn

The Lady Vols have historically been one of the nation's dominant programs in that sport. Starting in the mid-1990s, UConn has emerged as Tennessee's main rival for national prominence. The Huskies won four national titles between 2000 and 2004; in three of those years, their opponent in the NCAA final was Tennessee. Connecticut also defeated Tennessee in the 1995 Championship game, the Huskies' first-ever title. The Naismith Memorial Basketball Hall of Fame brokered a deal that saw the teams renew their rivalry with a home-and-home series in 2020 and 2021, and both schools extended the series through 2023.

== Softball ==
=== National championships, Women's College World Series, and NCAA tournament appearances ===
Southeastern Conference softball programs have combined to win five NCAA softball championships as SEC members. Florida and Texas have each won two national championships, and Alabama has won one, as SEC members. Oklahoma has won eight and Texas A&M has won two championships prior to joining the SEC. Twelve SEC teams have advanced to the Women's College World Series at least once in their history. Fourteen SEC schools (Alabama, Arkansas, Auburn, Florida, Georgia, Kentucky, LSU, Mississippi State, Missouri, Oklahoma, South Carolina, Tennessee, Texas, Texas A&M) are among the national top 50 in all-time NCAA tournament appearances.

School	Women's NCAA Championships	Women's NCAA Runner-Up	Women's NCAA College World Series Appearances	Women's NCAA Super Regional Appearances	Women's NCAA Tournament Appearances
Alabama	**1** (2012)	**1** (2014)	**15** (2000, 2003, 2005, 2006, 2008, 2009, 2011, 2012, 2014–16, 2019, 2021, 2023, 2024)	**19** (2005–19, 2021, 2023–25)	**26** (1999–2019, 2021–25)
Arkansas				**4** (2018, 2021, 2022, 2025)	**15** (2000, 2002, 2008–10, 2012, 2013, 2017–19, 2021–25)
Auburn		**1** (2016)	**2** (2015, 2016)	**3** (2015, 2016, 2017)	**20** (2002, 2004–06, 2008–12, 2014–19, 2021–25)
Florida	**2** (2014, 2015)	**3** (2009, 2011, 2017)	**13** (2008–11, 2013–15, 2017–19, 2022, 2024, 2025)	**16** (2007–11, 2013–19, 2021, 2022, 2024, 2025)	**25** (1998, 2000, 2001, 2003–19, 2021–25)
Georgia			**5** (2009, 2010, 2016, 2018, 2021)	**14** (2005, 2008–12, 2014–16, 2018, 2021, 2023–25)	**23** (2002–19, 2021–25)
Kentucky			**1** (2014)	**8** (2011, 2013–15, 2017–19, 2021)	**16** (2009–19, 2021–25)
LSU			**6** (2001, 2004, 2012, 2015–17)	**10** (2006, 2007, 2012, 2015–19, 2021, 2024)	**26** (1998–2004, 2006–19, 2021–25)
Ole Miss			**1** (2025)	**3** (2017, 2019, 2025)	**9** (2016–19, 2021–25)
Mississippi State				**1** (2022)	**19** (2000, 2002–05, 2007–09, 2012–15, 2017–19, 2021, 2022, 2024, 2025)
Missouri			**6** (1983, 1991, 1994, 2009, 2010, 2011)	**10** (2008–12, 2013, 2015, 2016, 2021, 2024)	**27** (1982, 1983, 1991, 1994, 1995, 1997, 1999, 2003–05, 2007–12, 2013–19, 2021–24)
Oklahoma	**8** (2000, 2013, 2016, 2017, 2021–24)	**2** (2012, 2019)	**25** (2000–04, 2011–14, 2016–19, 2021–24, 2025)	**20** (2005, 2007, 2008, 2010–19, 2021–24, 2025)	**31** (1994–2019, 2021–24, 2025)
South Carolina			**3** (1983, 1989, 1997)	**3** (2007, 2018, 2025)	**25** (1982, 1983, 1988, 1989, 1994–96, 1997, 1999–2004, 2007, 2013–19, 2023–25)
Tennessee		**2** (2007, 2013)	**9** (2005–07, 2010, 2012, 2013, 2015, 2023, 2025)	**14** (2005–07, 2010, 2012–15, 2017–19, 2023–25)	**22** (1999, 2004–19, 2021–25)
Texas	**2** (2025,2026)	**2** (2022, 2024)	**7** (1998, 2003, 2005, 2006, 2013, 2022, 2024, 2025)	**10** (2005, 2006, 2012, 2013, 2019, 2021–24, 2025)	**25** (1998, 1999, 2000, 2002, 2003, 2005–19, 2021–24, 2025)
Texas A&M	**2** (1983, 1987)	**3** (1984, 1986, 2008)	**8** (1983, 1984, 1986–88, 2007, 2008, 2017)	**8** (2005, 2007, 2008, 2011, 2013, 2017, 2018, 2024)	**35** (1983–88, 1990, 1991, 1994, 1996, 1999, 2000, 2002–12, 2013–19, 2021–25)

Seasons are listed by the calendar years in which they ended. Italics indicate honors earned before the school competed in the SEC.

=== Women's College World Series champions, runners-up, and scores ===
Note: Teams in bold are current SEC members who advanced to the WCWS while in the conference. Teams in bold italics are current SEC members who were either in another conference or an independent at the time of their appearance.

Year	Champion	Runner-up	Score(s)	Venue	
1983	**Texas A&M**	Cal State Fullerton	2–0 (12)	Seymour Smith Park	Omaha, Nebraska
1984	UCLA (2)	**Texas A&M**	1–0, 1–0 (13)	Seymour Smith Park	Omaha, Nebraska
1986	Cal State Fullerton	**Texas A&M**	3–0	Seymour Smith Park	Omaha, Nebraska
1987	**Texas A&M** (2)	UCLA	1–0, 4–1	Seymour Smith Park	Omaha, Nebraska
2000	**Oklahoma**	UCLA	3–1	ASA Hall of Fame Stadium	Oklahoma City, Oklahoma
2007	Arizona (8)	**Tennessee**	0–3, 1–0 (10), 5–0	ASA Hall of Fame Stadium	Oklahoma City, Oklahoma
2008	Arizona State	**Texas A&M**	3–0, 11–0	ASA Hall of Fame Stadium	Oklahoma City, Oklahoma
2009	Washington	**Florida**	8–0, 3–2	ASA Hall of Fame Stadium	Oklahoma City, Oklahoma
2011	Arizona State (2)	**Florida**	14–4, 7–2	ASA Hall of Fame Stadium	Oklahoma City, Oklahoma
2012	**Alabama**	**Oklahoma**	1–4, 8–6, 5–4	ASA Hall of Fame Stadium	Oklahoma City, Oklahoma
2013	**Oklahoma** (2)	**Tennessee**	5–3 (12), 4–0	ASA Hall of Fame Stadium	Oklahoma City, Oklahoma
2014	**Florida**	**Alabama**	5–0, 6–3	ASA Hall of Fame Stadium	Oklahoma City, Oklahoma
2015	**Florida** (2)	Michigan	3–2, 0–1, 4–1	ASA Hall of Fame Stadium	Oklahoma City, Oklahoma
2016	**Oklahoma** (3)	**Auburn**	3–2, 7–11 (8), 2–1	ASA Hall of Fame Stadium	Oklahoma City, Oklahoma
2017	**Oklahoma** (4)	**Florida**	7–5 (17), 5–4	ASA Hall of Fame Stadium	Oklahoma City, Oklahoma
2019	UCLA (12)	**Oklahoma**	16–3, 5–4	ASA Hall of Fame Stadium	Oklahoma City, Oklahoma
2021	**Oklahoma** (5)	Florida State	0–8, 6–2, 5–1	USA Softball Hall of Fame Stadium	Oklahoma City, Oklahoma
2022	**Oklahoma** (6)	**Texas**	16–1, 10–5	USA Softball Hall of Fame Stadium	Oklahoma City, Oklahoma
2023	**Oklahoma** (7)	Florida State	5–0, 3–1	USA Softball Hall of Fame Stadium	Oklahoma City, Oklahoma
2024	**Oklahoma** (8)	**Texas**	8–3, 8–4	Devon Park	Oklahoma City, Oklahoma
2025	**Texas**	Texas Tech	2–1, 3–4, 10–4	Devon Park	Oklahoma City, Oklahoma
2026	**Texas** (2)	Texas Tech	7–3, 4–1	Devon Park	Oklahoma City, Oklahoma

== Other sports ==
Besides football, badminton, basketball, and baseball, there are a number of other sports in which the Southeastern Conference actively competes.

=== Rivalries ===
- Alabama–Georgia, women's gymnastics

These two storied programs have often butted heads for not only SEC titles, but NCAA titles as well. Georgia has won ten national championships to Alabama's six. For decades the rivalry was dominated by two long-standing coaches, Suzanne Yoculan at Georgia and Sarah Patterson at Alabama. Yoculan and Patterson have since retired, bringing their personal rivalry to an end.

- Alabama–Florida, women's softball

These two nationally acclaimed softball programs have proven to be the elite of the SEC and the nation. While consistently being ranked in the nation's Top Ten, both teams find their way to the SEC Tournament Finals and often clash once more in the Women's College Softball World Series.

- Tennessee–LSU, women's softball
- Auburn–Texas, men's swimming and diving

One of the youngest rivalries featuring an SEC team, the Tigers and Texas Longhorns are the two most successful swimming and diving programs in the country. The two have combined for 17 NCAA National Titles since 1981 (nine for Texas, eight for Auburn) and between 1999 and 2007 won every national title awarded. The two regularly face off in a meet during the regular season, Auburn's men own a 12–9 record over the Longhorns. The women just recently began an annual series, with the Tigers winning the series so far 3–1. Texas was the only team to beat the Auburn men between 2001 and 2007.

== National team championships ==
Since the SEC's founding in December 1932, the varsity athletic teams of its current 16 members have won 274 (38 in addition are current SEC teams that weren't SEC teams when they won a national championship) national team sports championships.

The following is the list of the national team championships claimed by current SEC member schools, including those tournament championships currently or formerly sponsored by the National Collegiate Athletic Association (NCAA). The NCAA has never sponsored a tournament championship for major college football, the championship game for which is currently part of the College Football Playoff (CFP) system. Prior to 1992, championships for major college football were determined by a "consensus" of major polling services, including the Associated Press and United Press International college football polls. Recognized women's championships from 1972 to 1982 were administered by the Association for Intercollegiate Athletics for Women (AIAW), not the NCAA. There was a one-year overlap period during the 1981–82 school year, when both the AIAW and the NCAA operated women's championship tournaments; since 1982, only the NCAA has sponsored women's championship tournaments. National equestrian tournament championships are currently sponsored by the National Collegiate Equestrian Association (NCEA), not the NCAA. Those national championships dating from before 1933 predate the founding of the SEC in December 1932; championships won by Arkansas and South Carolina before the 1992–93 school year predate their membership in the SEC; championships won by Missouri and Texas A&M before the 2012–13 school year predate their membership in the SEC; championships won by Oklahoma and Texas before the 2024–25 school year predate their membership in the SEC.

Football (53):
1919 – Texas A&M*
1925 – Alabama*
1926 – Alabama*
1927 – Texas A&M*
1930 – Alabama*
1934 – Alabama
1938 – Tennessee
1939 – Texas A&M*
1940 – Tennessee
1941 – Alabama
1942 – Georgia
1950 – Oklahoma*
1951 – Tennessee
1955 – Oklahoma*
1956 – Oklahoma*
1957 – Auburn
1958 – LSU
1959 – Ole Miss
1960 – Ole Miss
1961 – Alabama
1962 – Ole Miss
1963 – Texas*
1964 – Arkansas*
1965 – Alabama
1967 – Tennessee
1969 – Texas*
1970 – Texas*
1973 – Alabama
1974 – Oklahoma*
1975 – Oklahoma*
1978 – Alabama
1979 – Alabama
1980 – Georgia
1985 – Oklahoma*
1992 – Alabama
1996 – Florida
1998 – Tennessee
2000 – Oklahoma*
2003 – LSU
2005 – Texas*
2006 – Florida
2007 – LSU
2008 – Florida
2009 – Alabama
2010 – Auburn
2011 – Alabama
2012 – Alabama
2015 – Alabama
2017 – Alabama
2019 – LSU
2020 – Alabama
2021 – Georgia
2022 – Georgia

Baseball (27):
1949 – Texas*
1950 – Texas*
1951 – Oklahoma*
1954 – Missouri*
1975 – Texas*
1983 – Texas*
1990 – Georgia
1991 – LSU
1993 – LSU
1994 – Oklahoma*
1996 – LSU
1997 – LSU
2000 – LSU
2002 – Texas*
2005 – Texas*
2009 – LSU
2010 – South Carolina
2011 – South Carolina
2014 – Vanderbilt
2017 – Florida
2019 – Vanderbilt
2021 – Mississippi State
2022 – Ole Miss
2023 – LSU
2024 – Tennessee
2025 – LSU
2026 – Oklahoma

Men's basketball (13):
1935 – LSU
1948 – Kentucky
1949 – Kentucky
1951 – Kentucky
1958 – Kentucky
1978 – Kentucky
1994 – Arkansas
1996 – Kentucky
1998 – Kentucky
2006 – Florida
2007 – Florida
2012 – Kentucky
2025 – Florida

Women's basketball (14):
1986 – Texas*
1987 – Tennessee
1989 – Tennessee
1991 – Tennessee
1996 – Tennessee
1997 – Tennessee
1998 – Tennessee
2007 – Tennessee
2008 – Tennessee
2011 – Texas A&M*
2017 – South Carolina
2022 – South Carolina
2023 – LSU
2024 – South Carolina

Women's bowling (3):
2007 – Vanderbilt
2018 – Vanderbilt
2023 – Vanderbilt

Boxing (1):
1949 – LSU

Men's cross country (12):
1972 – Tennessee
1984 – Arkansas*
1986 – Arkansas*
1987 – Arkansas*
1990 – Arkansas*
1991 – Arkansas*
1992 – Arkansas
1993 – Arkansas
1995 – Arkansas
1998 – Arkansas
1999 – Arkansas
2000 – Arkansas

Women's cross country (3):
1986 – Texas*
1988 – Kentucky
2026 – Alabama

Women's equestrian (20):
2002 – Texas A&M*
2003 – Georgia
2004 – Georgia
2005 – South Carolina
2006 – Auburn
2007 – South Carolina
2008 – Georgia
2009 – Georgia
2010 – Georgia
2011 – Auburn
2012 – Texas A&M*
2013 – Auburn
2014 – Georgia
2015 – South Carolina
2016 – Auburn
2017 – Texas A&M
2018 – Auburn
2019 – Auburn
2025 – Georgia
2026 – South Carolina

Men's golf (23):
1940 – LSU
1942 – LSU
1947 – LSU
1955 – LSU
1968 – Florida
1971 – Texas*
1972 – Texas*
1973 – Florida
1989 – Oklahoma*
1993 – Florida
1999 – Georgia
2001 – Florida
2005 – Georgia
2009 – Texas A&M*
2012 – Texas*
2013 – Alabama
2014 – Alabama
2015 – LSU
2017 – Oklahoma*
2022 – Texas*
2023 – Florida
2024 – Auburn
2026 – Auburn

Women's golf (5):
1985 – Florida
1986 – Florida
2001 – Georgia
2012 − Alabama
2021 − Ole Miss

Women's gymnastics (29):
1982 – Florida (AIAW)
1987 – Georgia
1988 – Alabama
1989 – Georgia
1991 – Alabama
1993 – Georgia
1996 – Alabama
1998 – Georgia
1999 – Georgia
2002 – Alabama
2005 – Georgia
2006 – Georgia
2007 – Georgia
2008 – Georgia
2009 – Georgia
2011 – Alabama
2012 – Alabama
2013 – Florida
2014 – Florida / Oklahoma* (tie)
2015 – Florida
2016 – Oklahoma*
2017 – Oklahoma*
2019 – Oklahoma*
2022 – Oklahoma*
2023 – Oklahoma*
2024 – LSU
2025 – Oklahoma
2026 – Oklahoma

Men's gymnastics (12):
1977 – Oklahoma*
1978 – Oklahoma*
1991 – Oklahoma*
2002 – Oklahoma*
2003 – Oklahoma*
2005 – Oklahoma*
2006 – Oklahoma*
2008 – Oklahoma*
2015 – Oklahoma*
2016 – Oklahoma*
2017 – Oklahoma*
2018 – Oklahoma*

Rifle (4):
2011 – Kentucky
2018 – Kentucky
2021 – Kentucky
2022 – Kentucky

Women's Rowing (4):
2021 – Texas*
2022 – Texas*
2024 – Texas*
2026 – Texas

Women's soccer (1):
1998 – Florida

Softball (16):
1982 – Texas A&M (AIAW)*
1983 – Texas A&M*
1987 – Texas A&M*
2000 – Oklahoma*
2012 – Alabama
2013 – Oklahoma*
2014 – Florida
2015 – Florida
2016 – Oklahoma*
2017 – Oklahoma*
2021 – Oklahoma*
2022 – Oklahoma*
2023 – Oklahoma*
2024 – Oklahoma*
2025 – Texas
2026 – Texas

Men's swimming (27):
1978 – Tennessee
1981 – Texas*
1983 – Florida
1984 – Florida
1988 – Texas*
1989 – Texas*
1990 – Texas*
1991 – Texas*
1996 – Texas*
1997 – Auburn
1999 – Auburn
2000 – Texas*
2001 – Texas*
2002 – Texas*
2003 – Auburn
2004 – Auburn
2005 – Auburn
2006 – Auburn
2007 – Auburn
2009 – Auburn
2010 – Texas*
2015 – Texas*
2016 – Texas*
2017 – Texas*
2018 – Texas*
2021 – Texas*
2026 – Texas

Women's swimming (24):
1979 – Florida (AIAW)
1981 – Texas* (AIAW)
1982 – Texas* (AIAW)
1982 – Florida
1984 – Texas*
1985 – Texas*
1986 – Texas*
1987 – Texas*
1988 – Texas*
1990 – Texas*
1991 – Texas*
1999 – Georgia
2000 – Georgia
2001 – Georgia
2002 – Auburn
2003 – Auburn
2004 – Auburn
2005 – Georgia
2006 – Auburn
2007 – Auburn
2010 – Florida
2013 – Georgia
2014 – Georgia
2016 – Georgia

Men's tennis (8):
1985 – Georgia
1987 – Georgia
1999 – Georgia
2001 – Georgia
2007 – Georgia
2008 – Georgia
2019 – Texas*
2021 – Florida

Women's tennis (17):
1992 – Florida
1993 – Texas*
1995 – Texas*
1994 – Georgia
1996 – Florida
1998 – Florida
2000 – Georgia
2003 – Florida
2011 – Florida
2012 − Florida
2015 – Vanderbilt
2017 – Florida
2021 – Texas*
2022 – Texas*
2024 – Texas A&M
2025 – Georgia
2026 – Texas A&M

Men's indoor track (33):
1965 – Missouri*
1984 – Arkansas*
1985 – Arkansas*
1986 – Arkansas*
1987 – Arkansas*
1988 – Arkansas*
1989 – Arkansas*
1990 – Arkansas*
1991 – Arkansas*
1992 – Arkansas*
1993 – Arkansas
1994 – Arkansas
1995 – Arkansas
1997 – Arkansas
1998 – Arkansas
1999 – Arkansas
2000 – Arkansas
2001 – LSU
2002 – Tennessee
2003 – Arkansas
2004 – LSU
2005 – Arkansas
2006 – Arkansas
2010 – Florida
2011 – Florida
2012 − Florida
2013 – Arkansas
2017 – Texas A&M
2018 – Florida
2019 – Florida
2022 – Texas*
2023 – Arkansas
2026 – Arkansas

Women's indoor track (27):
1986 – Texas*
1987 – LSU
1988 – Texas*
1989 – LSU
1990 – Texas*
1991 – LSU
1992 – Florida
1993 – LSU
1994 – LSU
1995 – LSU
1996 – LSU
1997 – LSU
1998 – Texas*
1999 – Texas*
2002 – LSU
2003 – LSU
2004 – LSU
2005 – Tennessee
2006 – Texas*
2009 – Tennessee
2015 – Arkansas
2018 – Georgia
2019 – Arkansas
2021 – Arkansas
2022 – Florida
2023 – Arkansas
2026 – Georgia

Men's outdoor track (31):
1933 – LSU
1974 – Tennessee
1985 – Arkansas*
1989 – LSU
1990 – LSU
1991 – Tennessee
1992 – Arkansas*
1993 – Arkansas
1994 – Arkansas
1995 – Arkansas
1996 – Arkansas
1997 – Arkansas
1998 – Arkansas
1999 – Arkansas
2001 – Tennessee
2002 – LSU
2003 – Arkansas
2009 – Texas A&M*
2010 – Texas A&M*
2011 – Texas A&M*
2012 − Florida
2013 − Florida / Texas A&M (tie)
2016 − Florida
2017 – Florida
2021 – LSU
2022 – Florida
2023 – Florida
2024 – Florida
2025 – Texas A&M
2026 – Arkansas

Women's outdoor track (33):
1981 – Tennessee (AIAW)
1982 – Texas* (AIAW)
1986 – Texas*
1987 – LSU
1988 – LSU
1989 – LSU
1990 – LSU
1991 – LSU
1992 – LSU
1993 – LSU
1994 – LSU
1995 – LSU
1996 – LSU
1997 – LSU
1998 – Texas*
1999 – Texas*
2000 – LSU
2002 – South Carolina
2003 – LSU
2005 – Texas*
2006 – Auburn
2008 – LSU
2009 – Texas A&M*
2010 – Texas A&M*
2011 – Texas A&M*
2014 – Texas A&M
2016 – Arkansas
2019 – Arkansas
2022 – Florida
2023 – Texas*
2024 – Arkansas
2025 – Georgia
2026 – Georgia

Women's volleyball (7):
1981 – Texas* (AIAW)
1988 – Texas*
2012 – Texas*
2020 – Kentucky (Note: Due to COVID-19 issues in the 2020–21 school year, the NCAA moved its women's volleyball championship from its normal fall 2020 schedule to spring 2021. It designated the championship as "2020", but the season as "2020–21".)
2022 – Texas*
2023 – Texas*
2025 – Texas A&M

Men's wrestling (7):
1936 – Oklahoma*
1951 – Oklahoma*
1952 – Oklahoma*
1957 – Oklahoma*
1960 – Oklahoma*
1963 – Oklahoma*
1974 – Oklahoma*

* A championship marked by an asterisk (*) indicates that the institution was not a member of the SEC at the time of the championship.

=== National team titles claimed by current SEC institutions ===
The sixteen members of the Southeastern Conference claim over 200 national team championships in sports currently or formerly sponsored by conference members. The following totals include national team championships sponsored by the National Collegiate Athletic Association (NCAA) from 1906 to present, the Association for Intercollegiate Athletics for Women (AIAW) from 1972 to 1982, and, in football, the Bowl Alliance, Bowl Coalition, Bowl Championship Series (BCS) and College Football Playoff (CFP) since 1992, as well as consensus national championships determined by the major football polls prior to 1992.

- Texas – 70
- LSU – 53
- Arkansas – 52
- Florida – 49
- Oklahoma – 47
- Georgia – 37
- Alabama – 29
- Tennessee – 22
- Auburn – 19
- Texas A&M – 19
- Kentucky – 14
- South Carolina – 7
- Vanderbilt – 5
- Ole Miss – 5
- Missouri – 2
- Mississippi State – 1

=== NCAA and AIAW national tournament team titles won by current SEC institutions ===
The following totals include national team tournament championships sponsored by the National Collegiate Athletic Association (NCAA) from 1906 to the present and the Association for Intercollegiate Athletics for Women (AIAW) from 1972 to 1982. The NCAA did not sponsor tournament championships in women's sports before the 1981–82 academic year, and the NCAA has never sponsored a national championship playoff or tournament in major college football. To date, the sixteen members of the SEC have won 217 NCAA and four AIAW championships:

- Texas – 66
- LSU – 59
- Arkansas – 56
- Florida – 39
- Oklahoma – 40
- Georgia – 33
- Tennessee – 17
- Auburn – 16
- Kentucky – 13
- Texas A&M – 15
- Alabama – 11
- South Carolina – 7
- Vanderbilt – 5
- Missouri – 2
- Ole Miss – 2
- Mississippi State – 1

== Broadcasting and media rights ==
SEC sports are televised exclusively by the ESPN family of networks, which includes ABC, ESPN, ESPN2, ESPNU, SEC Network, ESPN+, and SEC+.

For football scheduling, the SEC designates start windows (either Noon–1 EST, 3:30–4:30 EST, 3:30–8 EST, or 6–8 EST) before the season begins and schedules start times as the season progresses. ABC serves as the primary broadcaster of SEC football games with three possible broadcast windows available to air games: noon, 3:30 EST, and 7:30 EST. Every week, ABC designates its 3:30 EST window for an SEC game, carrying on the SEC's traditional window from its previous media rights agreement with CBS. However, unlike with CBS, the marquee game of the week does not necessarily air at 3:30 EST. The marquee game can air in any of the three windows that maximizes exposure, which is usually ABC's Saturday Night Football window at 7:30 EST. There is no limit to the maximum number of SEC games that can be designated for Saturday Night Football. This allows for ABC to air as many SEC doubleheaders, or tripleheaders in some weeks, as they would like throughout the season (compared to a limit of two doubleheaders per season with CBS that included one game at noon in one week and one game in primetime in the other week). ABC broadcasts are presented under the SEC on ABC banner. ABC also broadcasts the SEC Championship Game.

Remaining football games are assigned to ESPN and its other networks. Each season, one football game and a few men's basketball games for each team are broadcast on ESPN+ and SEC+, the online component of the SEC Network. Most other sports are broadcast on the SEC Network or on SEC+.

All SEC schools broadcast their radio play-by-play through SiriusXM, and the conference carries its own full-time radio network on satellite channel 256 (formerly 374), and via Sirius XM Online.

=== History ===
The SEC created the College Football Association in 1977 with other major conferences to negotiate contracts for broadcasting college football games.

Jefferson Pilot Sports began syndicated television coverage of men's basketball games in 1986 and football games in 1992, which were picked after the CFA allocated games for its national contract.

In 1994, the SEC became the first conference to leave the CFA when it announced a deal with CBS to televise one game each week. CBS paid about $17 million per season for the right to show the best game of the week. The network was required to televise each team at least once per season. The Conference soon reached a deal with ESPN to broadcast games in primetime.

In August 2008, the SEC announced an unprecedented 15-year television contract with CBS worth an estimated $55 million a year. This continued the previous deal that made CBS the exclusive over-the-air broadcaster of SEC sports. In the same month, the league also announced another landmark television contract with ESPN worth $2.25 billion or $150 million a year for fifteen years. The ESPN deal replaced the syndicated contract and ensured that all SEC football games would be televised nationally. The deal also committed ESPN and the conference to the creation of the SEC Network, which was finally created in 2014 and allowed for a significant increase in television coverage of SEC sports. Together, these contracts helped make the SEC one of the most nationally televised and visible conferences in the country.

In 2020, the SEC announced a new deal that made ESPN the sole televisor of SEC sports starting in 2024. The ten-year contract was reported to be about $300 million per year and will allow ESPN to broadcast the SEC on ABC as well as rights to the SEC Championship Game.

=== SEC Network ===
The SEC Network is a television and multimedia network that features exclusively Southeastern Conference content through a partnership between ESPN and the SEC. The network launched on August 14, 2014, with the first live football game scheduled for two weeks later between Texas A&M and South Carolina on Thursday, August 28 in Columbia, South Carolina.

The network is part of a deal between the Southeastern Conference and ESPN which is a 20-year agreement, beginning in August 2014 and running through 2034. The agreement served to create and operate a new multiplatform television network and accompanying digital platform in the hope of increasing revenue for member institutions and expanding the reach of the Southeastern Conference.

== Awards and honors ==
=== Athlete of the Year ===
The conference has presented athlete of the year awards in men's sports since 1976 and women's sports since 1984. The award has officially been known as the Roy F. Kramer Athlete of the Year Award since 2004.

List of Roy F. Kramer SEC Athlete of the Year winners
Year	Men's winners	School	Sport	Women's winners	School	Sport
1976	Harvey Glance	Auburn	Track and field	—N/a		
1977	Larry Seivers	Tennessee	Football	—N/a		
1978	Jack Givens	Kentucky	Basketball	—N/a		
1979	Reggie King	Alabama	Basketball	—N/a		
1980	Kyle Macy	Kentucky	Basketball	—N/a		
1981	Rowdy Gaines	Auburn	Swimming	—N/a		
1982	Buck Belue	Georgia	Football / baseball	—N/a		
1983	Herschel Walker	Georgia	Football / track and field	—N/a		
1984	Terry Hoage	Georgia	Football	Tracy Caulkins	Florida	Swimming
1985	Will Clark	Mississippi State	Baseball	Penney Hauschild	Alabama	Gymnastics
1986	Bo Jackson	Auburn	Football	Jennifer Gillom	Ole Miss	Basketball
1987	Cornelius Bennett	Alabama	Football	Lillie Leatherwood	Alabama	Track and field
1988	Will Perdue	Vanderbilt	Basketball	Dara Torres	Florida	Swimming
1989	Derrick Thomas	Alabama	Football	Bridgette Gordon	Tennessee	Basketball
1990	Alec Kessler	Georgia	Basketball	Dee Foster	Alabama	Gymnastics
1991	Shaquille O'Neal	LSU	Basketball	Daedra Charles	Tennessee	Basketball
1992	Shaquille O'Neal	LSU	Basketball	Vicki Goetze	Georgia	Golf
1993	Jamal Mashburn	Kentucky	Basketball	Nicole Haislett	Florida	Swimming
1994	Corliss Williamson	Arkansas	Basketball	Nicole Haislett	Florida	Swimming
1995	Todd Helton	Tennessee	Baseball	Jenny Hansen	Kentucky	Gymnastics
1996	Danny Wuerffel	Florida	Football	Saudia Roundtree	Georgia	Basketball
1997	Danny Wuerffel	Florida	Football	Trinity Johnson	South Carolina	Softball
1998	Peyton Manning	Tennessee	Football	Chamique Holdsclaw	Tennessee	Basketball
1999	Tim Couch	Kentucky	Football	Chamique Holdsclaw	Tennessee	Basketball
2000	Kip Bouknight	South Carolina	Baseball	Kristy Kowal	Georgia	Swimming
2001	Matías Boeker	Georgia	Tennis	Amy Yoder Begley	Arkansas	Cross country running
2002	Walter Lewis	LSU	Track and field	Andree' Pickens	Alabama	Gymnastics
2003	Alistair Cragg	Arkansas	Cross country running	LaToya Thomas	Mississippi State	Basketball
2004	Alistair Cragg	Arkansas	Cross country running	Jeana Rice	Alabama	Gymnastics
2005	Ryan Lochte	Florida	Swimming	Kirsty Coventry	Auburn	Swimming
2006	Xavier Carter	LSU	Track and field	Seimone Augustus	LSU	Basketball
2007	David Price	Vanderbilt	Baseball	Monica Abbott	Tennessee	Softball
2008	Tim Tebow	Florida	Football	Candace Parker	Tennessee	Basketball
2009	Tim Tebow	Florida	Football	Courtney Kupets	Georgia	Gymnastics
2010	Mark Ingram II	Alabama	Football	Susan Jackson	LSU	Gymnastics
2011	John-Patrick Smith	Tennessee	Tennis	Kayla Hoffman	Alabama	Gymnastics
2012	Anthony Davis	Kentucky	Basketball	Brooke Pancake	Alabama	Golf
2013	Johnny Manziel	Texas A&M	Football	Allison Schmitt	Georgia	Swimming
2014	A. J. Reed	Kentucky	Baseball	Hannah Rogers	Florida	Softball
2015	Andrew Benintendi	Arkansas	Baseball	Lauren Haeger	Florida	Softball
2016	Jarrion Lawson	Arkansas	Track and field	Bridget Sloan	Florida	Gymnastics
2017	Brent Rooker	Mississippi State	Baseball	Kendell Williams	Georgia	Track and field
2018	Caeleb Dressel	Florida	Swimming	A'ja Wilson	South Carolina	Basketball
2019	Grant Holloway	Florida	Track and field	María Fassi	Arkansas	Golf
2020	Joe Burrow	LSU	Football	Tyasha Harris	South Carolina	Basketball
2021	DeVonta Smith	Alabama	Football	Madison Lilley	Kentucky	Volleyball
2022	Bryce Young	Alabama	Football	Aliyah Boston	South Carolina	Basketball
2023	Dylan Crews	LSU	Baseball	Trinity Thomas	Florida	Gymnastics
2024	Jayden Daniels	LSU	Football	Parker Valby	Florida	Track and field
2025	Walter Clayton Jr.	Florida	Basketball	Darja Vidmanova	Georgia	Tennis
2026	Jackson Koivun	Auburn	Golf	Faith Torrez	Oklahoma	Gymnastics

=== NACDA Learfield Sports Directors' Cup rankings ===
The NACDA Learfield Sports Directors' Cup is an annual award given by the National Association of Collegiate Directors of Athletics to the U.S. colleges and universities with the most success in collegiate athletics.

Institution	2025– 26	2024– 25	2023– 24	2022– 23	2021– 22	2020– 21	2019– 20	2018– 19	2017– 18	2016– 17	10-yr Average
Alabama Crimson Tide	13	22	9	12	22	7	N/A	31	14	24	17
Arkansas Razorbacks	14	11	18	13	7	8	N/A	23	16	22	15
Auburn Tigers	26	19	33	36	32	50	N/A	37	18	32	31
Florida Gators	6	7	4	5	5	5	N/A	3	3	5	5
Georgia Bulldogs	8	14	16	7	19	10	N/A	21	8	13	13
Kentucky Wildcats	27	30	32	18	9	12	N/A	14	17	11	19
LSU Tigers	18	17	13	9	16	15	N/A	11	27	23	17
Ole Miss Rebels	34	27	38	39	20	22	N/A	56	38	39	35
Mississippi State Bulldogs	61	46	60	57	76	59	N/A	44	42	57	56
Missouri Tigers	65	50	55	50	57	48	N/A	51	33	31	49
Oklahoma Sooners	16	9	24	23	10	24	N/A	33	25	16	20
South Carolina Gamecocks	44	23	30	33	37	42	N/A	22	26	19	31
Tennessee Volunteers	15	6	3	6	13	26	N/A	25	35	45	19
Texas Longhorns	1	1	1	2	1	1	N/A	4	5	10	3
Texas A&M Aggies	12	15	6	24	25	19	N/A	15	10	14	16
Vanderbilt Commodores	40	58	57	56	66	56	N/A	45	55	67	56

University	Cup Wins	Top 10 rankings
Texas	5	26
Florida		32
Georgia		13
LSU		7
Texas A&M		7
Tennessee		5
Oklahoma		4
Arkansas		2
Kentucky		2
Alabama		2

=== 2025–26 Capital One Cup standings ===
The Capital One Cup is an award given annually to the best men's and women's Division I college athletics programs in the United States. Points are earned throughout the year based on final standings of NCAA Championships and final coaches' poll rankings.

Institution	Men's Ranking	Women's Ranking
Alabama	31	24
Arkansas	19	11
Auburn	20	49
Florida	26	15
Georgia	6	9
Kentucky	85	17
LSU	60	29
Ole Miss	16	54
Mississippi State	82	82
Missouri	NR	90
Oklahoma	2	23
South Carolina	85	19
Tennessee	42	17
Texas	9	1
Texas A&M	48	5
Vanderbilt	75	19

== See also ==
- List of independent southern basketball champions
- List of NCAA conferences
- List of SEC men's basketball tournament locations
- SEC on CBS
- Southeastern Conference Academic Consortium, located in Fayetteville, Arkansas
- SEC Community Service Team
- Southeastern Collegiate Rugby Conference
- College Hockey South, formerly known as the South Eastern Collegiate Hockey Conference (SECHC) – a non-varsity ice hockey conference featuring many SEC schools
