= 1911–12 Navy Midshipmen men's basketball team =

American college basketball season

1911–12 Navy Midshipmen men's basketball

Southern Champion
- Conference: Independent
- Record: 8–1
- Head coach: George Jacobs (1st season)
- Home arena: Dahlgren Hall

The 1911–12 Navy Midshipmen men's basketball team represented the United States Naval Academy in intercollegiate basketball during the 1911–12 season. The head coach was George Jacobs, coaching his first season with the Midshipmen.

== Schedule ==
Date time, TV	Opponent	Result	Record	Site city, state
*	Baltimore Med. College	W 14–13	1–0	Dahlgren Hall; Annapolis, MD
*	Yale	W 11–09	2–0	Dahlgren Hall; Annapolis, MD
Jan. 13, 1912* no, no	St. John's	W 32–28	3–0	Dahlgren Hall; Annapolis, MD
	St. John's MD.	W 35–18	4–0	Dahlgren Hall; Annapolis, MD
	Dickinson	W 45–12	5–0	Dahlgren Hall; Annapolis, MD
	Swarthmore	L 09–27	5–1	Dahlgren Hall; Annapolis, MD
	Catholic	W 72–15	6–1	Dahlgren Hall; Annapolis, MD
Feb. 19, 1912* no, no	New York U.	W 28–19	7–1	Dahlgren Hall; Annapolis, MD
Feb. 22, 1912 no, no	at Georgetown	W 40–19	8–1	Arcade Rink; Washington, DC
*Non-conference game. (#) Tournament seedings in parentheses.
