= 2005 Florida Gators baseball team =

American college baseball season

2005 Florida Gators baseball

SEC regular season champions Gainesville Regional champions Gainesville Super Regional champions

College World Series, runners-up 0–2 in CWS Finals
- Conference: Southeastern Conference

Ranking
- Coaches: No. 2
- CB: No. 2
- Record: 48–23 (20–10 SEC)
- Head coach: Pat McMahon (4th year)
- Assistant coach: Ross Jones (4th year); Tim Parenton (2nd year)
- Home stadium: Alfred A. McKethan Stadium

2005 Southeastern Conference baseball standings
	Conf.				Overall
Team	W		L	PCT	W		L	PCT
Eastern
No. 2 Florida ^{x}‍†‍‍^{y}	20	–	10	.667	48	–	23	.676
No. 8 Tennessee ‍‍‍^{y}	18	–	11	.621	46	–	21	.687
No. 26 South Carolina ‍‍‍^{y}	16	–	14	.533	41	–	23	.641
Vanderbilt ‍‍‍	13	–	17	.433	34	–	21	.618
Georgia ‍‍‍	12	–	17	.414	30	–	25	.545
Kentucky ‍‍‍	7	–	22	.241	29	–	27	.518
Western
No. 11 Ole Miss ^{x}‍‍‍^{y}	18	–	12	.600	40	–	22	.645
No. 19 LSU ^{x}‍‍‍^{y}	18	–	12	.600	40	–	22	.645
No. 20 Alabama ‍‍‍^{y}	17	–	13	.567	40	–	23	.635
Mississippi State ‍‍‡‍^{y}	13	–	16	.448	42	–	22	.656
Arkansas ‍‍‍^{y}	13	–	17	.433	39	–	22	.639
Auburn ‍‍‍^{y}	13	–	17	.433	34	–	26	.567
x – Division champion † – Conference champion ‡ – Tournament champion y – Invited to the NCAA tournament As of June 30, 2005; Rankings from Collegiate Baseball

The 2005 Florida Gators baseball team represented the University of Florida in the sport of baseball during the 2005 college baseball season. The Gators competed in Division I of the National Collegiate Athletic Association (NCAA) and the Eastern Division of the Southeastern Conference (SEC). They played their home games at Alfred A. McKethan Stadium, on the university's Gainesville, Florida campus. The team was coached by Pat McMahon, who was in his fourth season at Florida.

== Roster ==
2005 Florida Gators baseball team
Players
Coaches

#	Pos.	Name	B/T	Height	Weight	Year	Home town
44	RHP	Bryan Ball	R/R	6 ft 1 in (1.85 m)	210 lb (95 kg)	Jr	Punta Gorda, FL
11	C	Bryson Barber	R/R	6 ft 1 in (1.85 m)	220 lb (100 kg)	Fr	Pensacola, FL
6	OF	Stephen Barton	L/R	5 ft 10 in (1.78 m)	185 lb (84 kg)	Jr	Miami, FL
30	C	Carson Bassett	R/R	5 ft 8 in (1.73 m)	175 lb (79 kg)	Jr	Babson Park, FL
47	OF	Brett Bentley (redshirt)	R/R	6 ft 3 in (1.91 m)	210 lb (95 kg)	Fr	Tampa, FL
48	RHP	Tommy Boss	R/R	6 ft 2 in (1.88 m)	215 lb (98 kg)	Sr	Dunnellon, FL
39	RHP	Michael Branham	R/R	6 ft 3 in (1.91 m)	210 lb (95 kg)	Fr	Tampa, FL
10	OF	Daniel Brooks	R/R	5 ft 11 in (1.8 m)	210 lb (95 kg)	Jr	Tampa, FL
18	RHP	Tate Casey	R/R	6 ft 6 in (1.98 m)	219 lb (99 kg)	Fr	Longview, TX
7	OF	Jeff Corsaletti	L/R	6 ft 0 in (1.83 m)	190 lb (86 kg)	Sr	Port Charlotte, FL
9	INF	Adam Davis	S/R	5 ft 9 in (1.75 m)	180 lb (82 kg)	So	Fort Myers, FL
45	INF	Andy Davis	L/R	6 ft 0 in (1.83 m)	180 lb (82 kg)	Jr	Fort Myers, FL
17	OF	Gavin Dickey	R/R	5 ft 11 in (1.8 m)	190 lb (86 kg)	So	Tallahassee, FL
25	RHP	Josh Edmondson	R/R	6 ft 1 in (1.85 m)	195 lb (88 kg)	Fr	LaGrange, GA
23	RHP	Connor Falkenbach	R/R	5 ft 11 in (1.8 m)	175 lb (79 kg)	Sr	Parkland, FL
50	C	Teddy Foster	R/R	6 ft 3 in (1.91 m)	235 lb (107 kg)	Fr	Jacksonville, FL
34	RHP	Matt Fuchs	R/R	6 ft 2 in (1.88 m)	205 lb (93 kg)	So	Lakeland, FL
4	INF	Matt Gaski	L/R	5 ft 11 in (1.8 m)	175 lb (79 kg)	Fr	Greensboro, NC
20	RHP	Nate Helms	R/R	6 ft 2 in (1.88 m)	205 lb (93 kg)	Jr	Winter Haven, FL
22	LHP	Matt Hightower	L/L	5 ft 9 in (1.75 m)	170 lb (77 kg)	Fr	Cartersville, GA
32	RHP	Alan Horne	R/R	6 ft 4 in (1.93 m)	195 lb (88 kg)	Jr	Marianna, FL
38	LHP	David Hurst	L/L	6 ft 1 in (1.85 m)	205 lb (93 kg)	Jr	Jacksonville, FL
8	C	Brian Jeroloman	L/R	6 ft 0 in (1.83 m)	190 lb (86 kg)	So	Wellington, FL
5	OF	Jared Kubin	R/R	6 ft 1 in (1.85 m)	220 lb (100 kg)	Fr	Oakton, VA
13	C	Matt LaPorta	R/R	6 ft 1 in (1.85 m)	210 lb (95 kg)	So	Port Charlotte, FL
2	OF	Brian Leclerc	L/L	5 ft 9 in (1.75 m)	165 lb (75 kg)	So	Clearwater, FL
14	LHP	Stephen Locke	R/L	6 ft 1 in (1.85 m)	180 lb (82 kg)	So	Tampa, FL
31	RHP	Christian Madson	R/R	6 ft 7 in (2.01 m)	230 lb (104 kg)	Jr	Valrico, FL
3	INF	Brandon McArthur	R/R	6 ft 1 in (1.85 m)	185 lb (84 kg)	Fr	Seffner, FL
42	LHP	Thad McBurrows	L/L	6 ft 2 in (1.88 m)	215 lb (98 kg)	Fr	Lake Wales, FL
35	RHP	Darren O'Day	R/R	6 ft 3 in (1.91 m)	220 lb (100 kg)	Jr	Jacksonville, FL
27	LHP	Mike Pete	L/L	5 ft 10 in (1.78 m)	180 lb (82 kg)	Sr	Brandon, FL
15	LHP	Steven Porter	L/L	6 ft 3 in (1.91 m)	200 lb (91 kg)	So	Ocoee, FL
46	C	Greg Quatrino	R/R	6 ft 0 in (1.83 m)	210 lb (95 kg)	So	Tampa, FL
24	OF	Bo Smith	L/L	6 ft 2 in (1.88 m)	200 lb (91 kg)	Fr	Gainesville, FL
41	INF	Seth Steinhauer	L/R	6 ft 3 in (1.91 m)	220 lb (100 kg)	So	Stuart, FL
29	INF	Justin Tordi	R/R	6 ft 1 in (1.85 m)	200 lb (91 kg)	Jr	Orlando, FL
49	OF	Chris Woods	L/L	5 ft 10 in (1.78 m)	175 lb (79 kg)	Jr	Gainesville, FL
16	RHP	Tommy Wynn	R/R	6 ft 3 in (1.91 m)	190 lb (86 kg)	Fr	Fort Lauderdale, FL

Head coach

Pat McMahon

Assistant coach(es)

Ross Jones
Tim Parenton

Legend

- (C) Team captain
- (S) Suspended
- (I) Ineligible
- Injured
- Current redshirt

Roster

== Schedule ==
2005 Florida Gators baseball game log
Regular season
February

Date	Opponent	Rank	Stadium Site	Score	Win	Loss	Save	Attendance	Overall Record	SEC Record
February 11	Charleston Southern	No. 22	McKethan Stadium	4–5^{11}	Parnell (2–1)	O'Day (0–1)	None	2,372	0–1	–
February 12	Charleston Southern	No. 22	McKethan Stadium	3–2	O'Day (1–1)	Evans (0–1)	None	2,483	1–1	–
February 13	Charleston Southern	No. 22	McKethan Stadium	15–6	Ball (1–0)	Parnell (2–2)	None	2,086	2–1	–
February 15	Florida A&M		McKethan Stadium	17–2	Locke (1–0)	Tavernier (0–2)	None	1,523	3–1	–
February 18	No. 2 Miami (FL); Rivalry		McKethan Stadium	7–9	Camardese (1–0)	Falkenbach (0–1)	Gil (2)	4,169	3–2	–
February 19	No. 2 Miami (FL); Rivalry		McKethan Stadium	2–1^{11}	O'Day (2–1)	Orta (1–1)	None	4,531	4–2	–
February 20	No. 2 Miami (FL); Rivalry		McKethan Stadium	14-11	Boss (1–0)	Perez (2–1)	None	5,178	5–2	–
February 22	Florida A&M	No. 18	McKethan Stadium	18–3	Pete (1–0)	Patrick (0–3)	None	1,597	6–2	–
February 25	Rhode Island	No. 18	McKethan Stadium	5–4	Horne (1–0)	Frederick (0–1)	Falkenbach (1)	713	7–2	–
February 26	Rhode Island	No. 18	McKethan Stadium	6–0	Ball (2–0)	Zuercher (0–1)	None	1,656	8–2	–

March

Date	Opponent	Rank	Stadium Site	Score	Win	Loss	Save	Attendance	Overall Record	SEC Record
March 1	Mercer	No. 10	McKethan Stadium	13–1	Boss (2–0)	Bedrosian (1–1)	None	1,272	9–2	–
March 4	Villanova	No. 10	McKethan Stadium	1–11	Allen (2–0)	Horne (1–1)	None	1,338	9–3	–
March 5	Villanova	No. 10	McKethan Stadium	6–5	Ball (3–0)	Aust (0–1)	O'Day (1)	2,243	10–3	–
March 6	Villanova	No. 10	McKethan Stadium	6–5^{10}	O'Day (3–1)	Wendler (0–1)	None	2,689	11–3	–
March 8	UNC Asheville	No. 13	McKethan Stadium	8–1	Locke (2–0)	White (1–1)	Falkenbach (2)	1,418	12–3	–
March 9	UNC Asheville	No. 13	McKethan Stadium	5–8	Baughn (1–0)	O'Day (3–2)	None	329	12–4	–
March 11	Michigan State	No. 13	McKethan Stadium	17–1	Ball (4–0)	Day (2–1)	None	1,673	13–4	–
March 12	Michigan State	No. 13	McKethan Stadium	13–2	Boss (3–0)	Brookes (0–1)	None	2,138	14–4	–
March 13	Michigan State	No. 13	McKethan Stadium	10–0	Locke (3–0)	Malec (1–1)	None	1,493	15–4	–
March 18	at No. 20 Ole Miss	No. 10	Swayze Field; Oxford, MS	5–4	Ball (5–0)	Maloney (4–1)	Falkenbach (3)	3,320	16–4	1–0
March 19	at No. 20 Ole Miss	No. 10	Swayze Field	4–10	Head (4–0)	Horne (1–2)	None	3,506	16–5	1–1
March 20	at No. 20 Ole Miss	No. 10	Swayze Field	2–3	Cupps (4–1)	Boss (3–1)	Maloney (2)	3,180	16–6	1–2
March 22	No. 20 Central Florida	No. 12	McKethan Stadium	17–6	O'Day (4–2)	Petracca (0–1)	None	1,734	17–6	–
March 25	No. 6 South Carolina	No. 12	McKethan Stadium	0–2	Rawl (5–2)	Ball (5–1)	Fletcher (2)	2,376	17–7	1–3
March 26	No. 6 South Carolina	No. 12	McKethan Stadium	7–3	Boss (4–1)	McCamie (5–1)	O'Day (2)	1,238	18–7	2–3
March 27	No. 6 South Carolina	No. 12	McKethan Stadium	6–1	Falkenbach (1–1)	Fletcher (2–1)	None	1,583	19–7	3–3
March 30	at No. 6 Florida State; Rivalry	No. 9	Dick Howser Stadium; Tallahassee, FL	9–2	Locke (4–0)	Jones (4–1)	None	5,678	20–7	–

April

Date	Opponent	Rank	Stadium Site	Score	Win	Loss	Save	Attendance	Overall Record	SEC Record
April 1	Kentucky	No. 9	McKethan Stadium	10–9	Porter (1–0)	Baber (0–1)	None	1,652	21–7	4–3
April 2	Kentucky	No. 9	McKethan Stadium	20-11	Pete (2–0)	Albers (3–2)	None	2,613	22–7	5–3
April 3	Kentucky	No. 9	McKethan Stadium	11–6	O'Day (5–2)	Baber (0–2)	None	2,043	23–7	6–3
April 8	at Georgia	No. 6	Foley Field; Athens, GA	2–5	Hyle (2–2)	Boss (4–2)	Startup (4)	2,421	23–8	6–4
April 9	at Georgia	No. 6	Foley Field	12–1	Horne (2–2)	Ruthven (1–3)	None	3,717	24–8	7–4
April 10	at Georgia	No. 6	Foley Field	10–1	Locke (5–0)	Startup (3–2)	None	3,021	25–8	8–4
April 15	No. 17 Alabama	No. 7	McKethan Stadium	9–8	Falkenbach (2–1)	Large (5–3)	O'Day (3)	2,886	26–8	9–4
April 16	No. 17 Alabama	No. 7	McKethan Stadium	7–4	Horne (3–2)	LeBlanc (2–2)	O'Day (4)	3,643	27–8	10–4
April 17	No. 17 Alabama	No. 7	McKethan Stadium	6–9	Robertson (6–2)	O'Day (5–3)	None	2,846	27–9	10–5
April 19	at No. 14 Florida State; Rivalry	No. 6	Dick Howser Stadium	2–4	Henry (3–2)	Wynn (0–1)	Chambliss (11)	5,045	27–10	–
April 22	at No. 23 Auburn	No. 6	Plainsman Park; Auburn, AL	4–2	Boss (5–2)	Hughey (3–4)	O'Day (5)	2,903	28–10	11–5
April 23	at No. 23 Auburn	No. 6	Plainsman Park	5–4	Horne (4–2)	Sullivan (6–4)	Falkenbach (4)	3,422	29–10	12–5
April 24	at No. 23 Auburn	No. 6	Plainsman Park	6–3	Falkenbach (3–1)	Madden (6–1)	None	3,036	30–10	13–5
April 29	No. 19 Tennessee	No. 3	McKethan Stadium	5–11	Hochevar (10–2)	Boss (5–3)	None	4,023	30–11	13–6
April 30	No. 19 Tennessee	No. 3	McKethan Stadium	18–9	Horne (5–2)	Adkins (6–2)	None	2,538	31–11	14–6

May

Date	Opponent	Rank	Stadium Site	Score	Win	Loss	Save	Attendance	Overall Record	SEC Record
May 1	No. 19 Tennessee	No. 3	McKethan Stadium	2–7	Cobb (5–2)	Ball (5–2)	None	1,632	31–12	14–7
May 3	No. 15 Florida State; Rivalry	No. 4	McKethan Stadium	4–9	Sauls (5–1)	Locke (5–1)	Chambliss (12)	5,483	31–13	–
May 6	at Arkansas	No. 4	Baum Stadium; Fayetteville, AR	1–4	Schmidt (7–1)	Ball (5–3)	None	7,602	31–14	14–8
May 7	at Arkansas	No. 4	Baum Stadium	2–3^{10}	–	Falkenbach (3–2)	–	–	31–15	14–9
May 8	at Arkansas	No. 4	Baum Stadium	11-10	Boss (6–3)	Smith (1–2)	Falkenbach (5)	6,678	32–15	15–9
May 10	South Florida	No. 12	McKethan Stadium	7–8	Pryor (4–3)	Porter (1–1)	Mattison (7)	1,528	32–16	–
May 11	at South Florida	No. 12	Red McEwen Field; Tampa, FL	5–11	Manganaro (1–2)	Wynn (0–2)	Bilardello (1)	1,078	32–17	–
May 13	Mississippi State	No. 12	McKethan Stadium	8–2	Ball (6–3)	Johnson (3–6)	None	2,429	33–17	16–9
May 14	Mississippi State	No. 12	McKethan Stadium	2–1	Horne (6–2)	Doolittle (4–7)	None	2,577	34–17	17–9
May 15	Mississippi State	No. 12	McKethan Stadium	5–6	Valentine (5–0)	Falkenbach (3–3)	None	2,539	34–18	17–10
May 18	Stetson	No. 12	McKethan Stadium	6–4	Pete (3–0)	Elsemiller (3–4)	Falkenbach (6)	1,637	35–18	–
May 20	at Vanderbilt	No. 12	Hawkins Field; Nashville, TN	5–4	Horne (7–2)	Lewis (8–3)	Falkenbach (7)	1,563	36–18	18–10
May 21	at Vanderbilt	No. 12	Hawkins Field	2–1^{13}	O'Day (6–3)	Sues (3–5)	Pete (1)	1,673	37–18	19–10
May 22	at Vanderbilt	No. 12	Hawkins Field	6–3	Pete (4–0)	Buschmann (4–3)	Falkenbach (8)	1,819	38–18	20–10

Postseason
SEC Tournament

Date	Opponent	Rank	Stadium Site	Score	Win	Loss	Save	Attendance	Overall Record	SECT Record
May 25	vs. Arkansas	No. 7	Metropolitan Stadium; Hoover, AL	9–8	O'Day (7–3)	Boyce (10–8)	None	11,318	39–18	1–0
May 26	vs. No. 21 Ole Miss	No. 7	Metropolitan Stadium	10–7	Porter (2–1)	Head (7–3)	O'Day (6)	7,482	40–18	2–0
May 28 (1)	vs. No. 21 Ole Miss	No. 7	Metropolitan Stadium	1–14^{7}	Cupps (8–3)	Ball (6–4)	None	6,162	40–19	2–1
May 28 (2)	vs. No. 21 Ole Miss	No. 7	Metropolitan Stadium	2–4	Baumgardner (2–1)	Boss (6–4)	Stone (1)	6,162	40–20	2–2

NCAA tournament: Gainesville Regional

Date	Opponent	Rank	Stadium Site	Score	Win	Loss	Save	Attendance	Overall Record	Regional Record
June 4 (1)	Stetson	No. 8	McKethan Stadium	8–3	Ball (7–4)	Ingoglia (8–4)	None	3,670	41–20	1–0
June 4 (2)	No. 21 North Carolina	No. 8	McKethan Stadium	5–2	Boss (7–4)	Miller (8–4)	None	4,740	42–20	2–0
June 5	Notre Dame	No. 8	McKethan Stadium	23–3	Horne (8–2)	Korpi (4–3)	None	4,851	43–20	3–0

NCAA tournament: Gainesville Super Regional

Date	Opponent	Rank	Stadium Site	Score	Win	Loss	Save	Attendance	Overall Record	Super Reg. Record
June 10	No. 14 Florida State; Rivalry	No. 8	McKethan Stadium	8–1	Boss (8–4)	Henry (9–3)	None	5,250	44–20	1–0
June 11	No. 14 Florida State; Rivalry	No. 8	McKethan Stadium	8–5	Horne (9–2)	Sauls (6–2)	Falkenbach (9)	5,698	45–20	2–0

College World Series

Date	Opponent	Rank	Stadium Site	Score	Win	Loss	Save	Attendance	Overall Record	CWS Record
June 17	vs. No. 7 Tennessee	No. 6	Rosenblatt Stadium; Omaha, NE	6–4	Horne (10–2)	Hochevar (15–3)	O'Day (7)	21,546	46–20	1–0
June 19	vs. No. 3 Nebraska	No. 6	Rosenblatt Stadium	7–4	O'Day (8–3)	Dorn (12–2)	None	26,813	47–20	2–0
June 22	vs. No. 8 Arizona State	No. 6	Rosenblatt Stadium	1–6	Averill (11–4)	Ball (7–5)	None	–	47–21	2–1
June 23	vs. No. 8 Arizona State	No. 6	Rosenblatt Stadium	6–3	Boss (9–4)	Bordes (5–7)	None	16,819	48–21	3–1
Finals										Record
June 25	vs. No. 5 Texas	No. 6	Rosenblatt Stadium	2–4	Alaniz (8–3)	Locke (5–2)	Cox (18)	25,958	48–22	0–1
June 26	vs. No. 5 Texas	No. 6	Rosenblatt Stadium	2–6	McCulloch (12–4)	Ball (7–6)	Cox (19)	19,836	48–23	0–2

Rankings from Collegiate Baseball. All times Eastern. Retrieved from FloridaGators.com

== See also ==
- Florida Gators
- List of Florida Gators baseball players
