= 1990 Southeastern Conference baseball tournament =

- Teams: 6
- Format: Six-team double elimination tournament
- Finals site: Hoover Metropolitan Stadium; Hoover, Alabama
- Champions: LSU, Mississippi State (2nd, 4th title)
- Winning coach: Skip Bertman, Ron Polk (2nd, 4th title)
- MVP: Jon Harden (Mississippi State)
- Attendance: 32,163

1990 Southeastern Conference baseball standings
	Conf.				Overall
Team	W		L	PCT	W		L	PCT
No. 4 LSU ‍†‍‡‍^{y}	20	–	7	.741	54	–	19	.740
No. 1 Georgia ‍‍‍^{y}	18	–	9	.667	52	–	19	.732
No. 5 Mississippi State ‍‍‡‍^{y}	17	–	9	.654	50	–	21	.704
Auburn ‍‍‍	13	–	13	.500	34	–	24	.586
Vanderbilt ‍‍‍	12	–	13	.480	28	–	30	.483
Florida ‍‍‍	11	–	12	.478	29	–	30	.492
Alabama ‍‍‍	10	–	13	.435	34	–	21	.618
Ole Miss ‍‍‍	10	–	16	.385	23	–	29	.442
Tennessee ‍‍‍	9	–	18	.333	28	–	31	.475
Kentucky ‍‍‍	8	–	18	.308	27	–	29	.482
† – Conference champion ‡ – Tournament champion y – Invited to the NCAA tournament As of June 30, 1990; Rankings from Collegiate Baseball

The 1990 Southeastern Conference baseball tournament was held at the Hoover Metropolitan Stadium in Hoover, Alabama from May 17 through 20. LSU and Mississippi State were declared co-champions the tournament as a result of a weather-cancelled championship game.

== Regular season results ==
Team	W	L	Pct	GB	Seed
LSU	20	7	.741	—	1
Georgia	18	9	.667	2	2
Mississippi State	17	9	.654	2.5	3
Auburn	13	13	.500	6.5	4
Vanderbilt	12	13	.480	7	5
Florida	11	12	.478	7	6
Alabama	10	13	.435	8	—
Ole Miss	10	16	.385	9.5	—
Tennessee	9	18	.333	11	—
Kentucky	8	18	.308	11.5	—

== Tournament ==
First round
5	Vanderbilt	6
2	Georgia	3
6	Florida	4
1	LSU	6
4	Auburn	2
3	Mississippi State	16

Second round
5	Vanderbilt	4
4	Auburn	3
1	LSU	17
3	Mississippi State	8
2	Georgia	5
6	Florida	6

Third round
5	Vanderbilt	5
1	LSU	13
6	Florida	2
3	Mississippi State	8

Semi-finals
3	Mississippi State	17
5	Vanderbilt	9

Finals
1	LSU	1	6^
3	Mississippi State	3	0^

- ^: LSU and Mississippi State were declared 1990 tournament co-champions by SEC commissioner Roy Kramer when lightning and rain ended play in the championship game with LSU leading 6–0 with one out in the bottom of the fourth inning.

== All-Tournament Team ==
Position	Player	School
1B	Tommy Raffo	Mississippi State
2B	Scott Mitchell	Mississippi State
SS	Scott Bethea	LSU
3B	Burke Masters	Mississippi State
C	Jeff Martin	Vanderbilt
OF	Ron Lim	LSU
OF	David Mitchell	Mississippi State
OF	Wes Grisham	LSU
DH	Todd Muckerheide	Vanderbilt
P	Jon Harden	Mississippi State
P	Chad Ogea	LSU
P	Bobby Reed	Mississippi State
MVP	Jon Harden	Mississippi State

== See also ==
- College World Series
- NCAA Division I Baseball Championship
- Southeastern Conference baseball tournament
