= 2005 Southeastern Conference baseball tournament =

- Teams: 8
- Format: Two pools of four-team double elimination
- Finals site: Hoover Metropolitan Stadium; Hoover, Alabama
- Champions: Mississippi State (6th title)
- Winning coach: Ron Polk (5th title)
- MVP: Jeff Butts (Mississippi State)
- Attendance: 119,580

2005 Southeastern Conference baseball standings
	Conf.				Overall
Team	W		L	PCT	W		L	PCT
Eastern
No. 2 Florida ^{x}‍†‍‍^{y}	20	–	10	.667	48	–	23	.676
No. 8 Tennessee ‍‍‍^{y}	18	–	11	.621	46	–	21	.687
No. 26 South Carolina ‍‍‍^{y}	16	–	14	.533	41	–	23	.641
Vanderbilt ‍‍‍	13	–	17	.433	34	–	21	.618
Georgia ‍‍‍	12	–	17	.414	30	–	25	.545
Kentucky ‍‍‍	7	–	22	.241	29	–	27	.518
Western
No. 11 Ole Miss ^{x}‍‍‍^{y}	18	–	12	.600	40	–	22	.645
No. 19 LSU ^{x}‍‍‍^{y}	18	–	12	.600	40	–	22	.645
No. 20 Alabama ‍‍‍^{y}	17	–	13	.567	40	–	23	.635
Mississippi State ‍‍‡‍^{y}	13	–	16	.448	42	–	22	.656
Arkansas ‍‍‍^{y}	13	–	17	.433	39	–	22	.639
Auburn ‍‍‍^{y}	13	–	17	.433	34	–	26	.567
x – Division champion † – Conference champion ‡ – Tournament champion y – Invited to the NCAA tournament As of June 30, 2005; Rankings from Collegiate Baseball

The 2005 Southeastern Conference baseball tournament was held at Hoover Metropolitan Stadium in Hoover, Alabama from May 25 through 29. Mississippi State won the tournament and earned the Southeastern Conference's automatic bid to the 2005 NCAA tournament.

== Regular season Results ==
Eastern Division
Team	W	L	Pct	GB	Seed
Florida	20	10	.667	--	1
Tennessee	18	11	.621	1.5	3
South Carolina	16	14	.533	4	6
Vanderbilt	13	17	.433	7	--
Georgia	12	17	.414	7.5	--
Kentucky	7	22	.241	12.5	--

Western Division
Team	W	L	Pct	GB	Seed
LSU	18	12	.600	--	2
Ole Miss	18	12	.600	--	4
Alabama	17	13	.567	1	5
Mississippi State	13	16	.448	4.5	7
Arkansas	13	17	.433	5	8
Auburn	13	17	.433	5	--

== Tournament ==
First round
1	Florida	9
8	Arkansas	8
5	Alabama	1
4	Ole Miss	3
8	Arkansas	4
5	Alabama	5
3	Tennessee	2
6	South Carolina	12
7	Mississippi State	9
2	LSU	2
3	Tennessee	5
2	LSU	1

Second round
1	Florida	10
4	Ole Miss	7
5	Alabama	3
4	Ole Miss	5
6	South Carolina	2
7	Mississippi State	6
3	Tennessee	4
6	South Carolina	1

Semifinals
1	Florida	1	2
4	Ole Miss	14	4
7	Mississippi State	3	-
3	Tennessee	2	-

Finals
4	Ole Miss	1
7	Mississippi State	4

- Vanderbilt, Auburn, Georgia and Kentucky did not make the tournament.

== All-Tournament Team ==
Position	Player	School
1B	Matt LaPorta	Florida
2B	Jeffrey Rea	Mississippi State
3B	Neil Giesler	South Carolina
SS	Zack Cozart	Ole Miss
C	J. P. Arencibia	Tennessee
OF	Jeff Butts	Mississippi State
OF	Walter Cochrane	South Carolina
OF	Jeff Corsaletti	Florida
DH	Justin Henry	Ole Miss
P	Mark Holliman	Ole Miss
P	Todd Doolittle	Mississippi State
MVP	Jeff Butts	Mississippi State

== See also ==
- College World Series
- NCAA Division I Baseball Championship
- Southeastern Conference baseball tournament
