= Mississippi State Bulldogs baseball =

American intercollegiate baseball squad

- 2026 Mississippi State Bulldogs baseball team
- Founded: 1885; 141 years ago
- Overall record: 2,883–1,700–29 (.628)
- University: Mississippi State University
- Athletic director: Zac Selmon
- Head coach: Brian O'Connor (1st season)
- Conference: SEC
- Location: Starkville, Mississippi
- Home stadium: Dudy Noble Field (capacity: 15,500)
- Nickname: Bulldogs
- Colors: Maroon and white

College World Series champions
- 2021

College World Series runner-up
- 2013

College World Series appearances
- 1971, 1979, 1981, 1985, 1990, 1997, 1998, 2007, 2013, 2018, 2019, 2021

NCAA regional champions
- 1979, 1981, 1985, 1990, 1997, 1998, 2000, 2001, 2007, 2011, 2013, 2016, 2017, 2018, 2019, 2021, 2026

NCAA tournament appearances
- 1949, 1953, 1965, 1966, 1970, 1971, 1978, 1979, 1981, 1983, 1984, 1985, 1987, 1988, 1989, 1990, 1991, 1992, 1993, 1996, 1997, 1998, 1999, 2000, 2001, 2003, 2004, 2005, 2006, 2007, 2011, 2012, 2013, 2014, 2016, 2017, 2018, 2019, 2021, 2024, 2025, 2026

Conference tournament champions
- 1979, 1985, 1987, 1990, 2001, 2005, 2012

Conference regular season champions
- 1909, 1922, 1924, 1948, 1949, 1965, 1966, 1970, 1971, 1979, 1985, 1987, 1989, 2016

Conference division regular season champions
- 1948, 1949, 1953, 1962, 1965, 1966, 1970, 1971, 1979, 1981, 1983, 1985, 1989, 2016, 2019

The Mississippi State Bulldogs baseball team is the varsity intercollegiate baseball team representing Mississippi State University in NCAA Division I college baseball. The program is a member of the Southeastern Conference (SEC). They are currently led by head coach Brian O'Connor. They have appeared in the College World Series 12 times, winning their first national championship in their most recent appearance in 2021.

== History ==
Mississippi State has won 11 SEC Championships in 1948, 1949, 1965, 1966, 1970, 1971, 1979, 1985, 1987, 1989, and 2016. The first six were won in a playoff series (with the first two being best-of-five while the rest were a best-of-three series). Since the formation of the SEC Tournament in 1977, the Bulldogs have won it seven times, in 1979, 1985, 1987, 1990, 2001, 2005, and 2012. The seven tournament championships and six playoff championships are a total of 13 SEC postseason championships, the most of any school.

Prior to the formation of the SEC, the program won the Southern Intercollegiate Athletic Association championship in 1909 as well as the Southern Conference title in 1922 and 1924.

The program has also appeared in 34 NCAA Regionals and 12 College World Series. Out of its 12 College World Series trips, the program has appeared in two national championship series (2013 and 2021). Eight years after finishing as runner-up to the UCLA Bruins in 2013, the Mississippi State Bulldogs returned to the national championship series when on June 30, 2021, the club defeated the Vanderbilt Commodores with a score of 9–0 to finally secure its first National Championship title, which serves as the first national championship in a team-sport in school history. This 2021 National Championship was earned in a third consecutive trip to the College World Series (2018, 2019, 2021).

A Bulldogs pitcher was selected in the first round of the MLB draft 6 times.

- *2020 College World Series did not take place due to the cancellation of the 2020 college baseball season in the presence of the COVID-19 Pandemic. The team had achieved a 12–4 record to start the 2020 season before it was discontinued during March 2020.

== Venue ==
The Bulldogs play their home games at Dudy Noble Field, Polk-DeMent Stadium. Dubbed the "Carnegie Hall of College Baseball" by Nelle Cohen, wife of former MSU skipper and current Auburn Athletic Director John Cohen, it was the host site of the first SEC tournament and holds the NCAA baseball on-campus attendance record of 16,423 spectators, set in a game against the University of Mississippi on April 15, 2023. The stadium has hosted all 25 of the top 25 largest crowds to attend an on-campus college baseball game, which the top 10 belong solely to Mississippi State. In 2013, Paul Swaney of Stadium Journey ranked it as the number one collegiate ballpark. One of the venue's most prominent features is the Left Field Lounge, an outfield area where spectators can gather and enjoy the games in a tailgate setting, including stands built on top of old pick-up trucks and trailers.

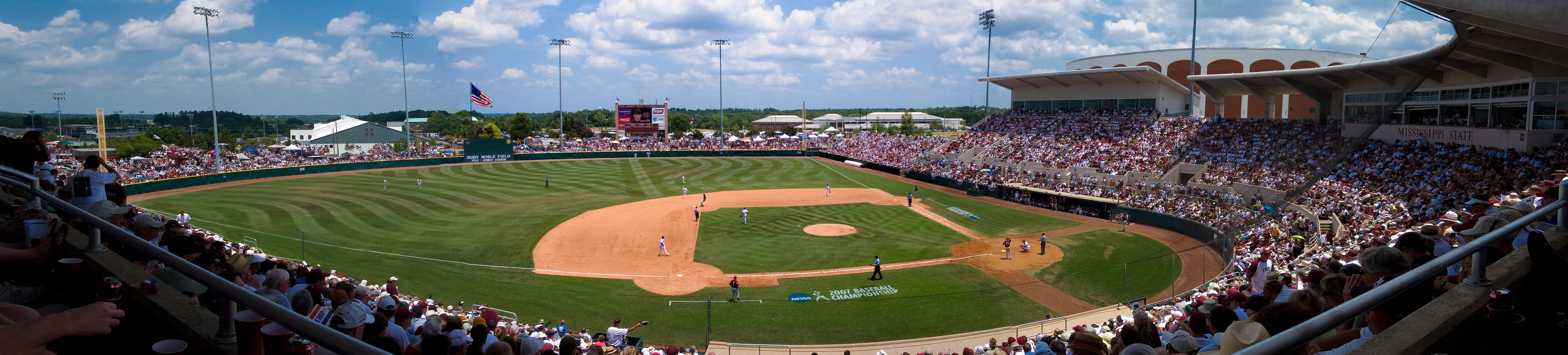
(Old) Dudy Noble Field/Polk-Dement Stadium

In 2005, the Palmeiro Center, a 68,000-square-foot (6,300 m^{2}) indoor practice facility, was built next to Dudy Noble. The facility, made possible by a gift from program alumnus Rafael Palmeiro and his wife Lynne, features an infield practice area, additional training area, and three batting cages. A baseball coaches' office complex located between the Palmeiro Center and Dudy Noble Field was also built in 2005. The complex, which includes a baseball heritage room, was made possible by contributions from former Bulldog players Jeff Brantley, Will Clark, Eric DuBose, Paul Maholm, Jay Powell and Bobby Thigpen, along with sports agent and former Bulldog manager Bo McKinnis.

== Attendance ==
The program has set many attendance records at Dudy Noble Field. SEC and Super Regional weekend games usually draw the largest crowds to Dudy Noble Field. Mississippi State currently holds the NCAA record for the largest single game on-campus baseball attendance at 15,586 and the largest regular season crowd for a 3-game weekend series at 39,181. In 2021, in a Super Regional against Notre Dame, Mississippi State set NCAA attendance records for Super Regional games with 14,385 and 13,971 fans and a record total for a 3-game series of 40,140. More than 5 million spectators have attended games at the venue since the university started tracking attendance numbers in 1976. Mississippi State holds all of the top 10 and 23 of the top 25 on-campus crowds in college baseball history, including 14 crowds of over 12,000 and 42 crowds of over 10,000.

Shown below are the 10 largest home crowds in Mississippi State history. Note that nine of these crowds are among the NCAA's 10 largest ever on-campus crowds.

Rank	Attendance	Opponent	Date	Note
1	16,423	Mississippi	April 15, 2023	NCAA On-Campus Record
2	15,586	Mississippi	April 12, 2014	#2 NCAA On-Campus Record
3	15,078	Texas A&M	April 16, 2016	#3 NCAA On-Campus Record
4	14,991	Florida	April 22, 1989	#4 NCAA On-Campus Record
5	14,739	Mississippi	April 14, 2023	#5 NCAA On-Campus Record
6	14,562	Auburn	April 20, 2013	#6 NCAA On-Campus Record
7	14,468	Mississippi	May 9, 2025	#7 NCAA On-Campus Record
8	14,385	Notre Dame	June 12, 2021	#7 NCAA on-campus record NCAA Super Regional single-game record
9	14,378	LSU	April 16, 1988	#8 NCAA on-campus record

== MLB First Round Picks ==
Year	Player	Pick	Team
1966	Del Unser	18	Washington Senators
1985	Rafael Palmeiro	22	Chicago Cubs via Padres
1985	Will Clark	2	San Francisco Giants
1992	B.J. Wallace	3	Montreal Expos
1993	Jay Powell	19	Baltimore Orioles
1994	Carlton Loewer	23	Philadelphia Phillies
1997	Eric Dubose	21	Oakland Athletics via Orioles
1999	Matt Ginter	22	Chicago White Sox via Mets
2003	Paul Maholm	8	Pittsburgh Pirates
2007	Ed Easley	61*	Arizona Diamondbacks
2012	Chris Stratton	20	San Francisco Giants
2013	Hunter Renfroe	13	San Diego Padres
2016	Dakota Hudson	34	St. Louis Cardinals
2017	Brent Rooker	35**	Minnesota Twins
2019	Ethan Small	28	Milwaukee Brewers
2020	Justin Foscue	14	Texas Rangers
2020	Jordan Westburg	30	Baltimore Orioles
2021	Will Bednar	14	San Francisco Giants
2022	Landon Sims	34***	Arizona Diamondbacks
2024	Jurrangelo Cijntje	15	Seattle Mariners

* 1st round of the 2007 MLB Supplemental Draft

** Taken in the Competitive Balance 1st round of the 2017 MLB Draft

*** Taken in the Competitive Balance 1st round in the 2022 MLB Draft

== Mississippi State's 1st Team All-Americans ==
Player	Position	Year(s)	Selectors
Del Unser	Outfield	1966	SN
Philip Still	Third Base	1971†	ABCA
Nat "Buck" Showalter	Outfield	1977†	ABCA
Mike Kelly	Outfield	1979†	ABCA
Mark Gillaspie	Outfield	1981†	ABCA
Rafael Palmeiro	First Base	1983, 1984†, 1985	BA, ABCA, SN
Will Clark	First Base	1984, 1985†	SN, BA, ABCA
Jeff Brantley	Pitcher	1985†	ABCA, BA
Pete Young	Utility player	1989†	ABCA
Gary Rath	Pitcher	1994†	ABCA, BA
Brian Wiese	Utility player	1998	NCBWA
Brad Corley	Outfield	2004	BA
Edward Easley	Catcher	2010†	ABCA
Chris Stratton	Pitcher	2012†	ABCA, BA, CB, NCBWA
Jonathan Holder	Pitcher	2013	CB, NCBWA
Hunter Renfroe	Outfield	2013†	ABCA, BA, CB, NCBWA
Jacob Lindgren	Pitcher	2014	BA
Brent Rooker	First Base	2017†	ABCA, BA, CB, NCBWA
Ethan Small	Pitcher	2019†	ABCA, BA, NCBWA
Jake Mangum	Outfielder	2019	CB, NCBWA
Tanner Allen	Outfielder	2021†	ABCA, BA, CB, NCBWA
Ace Reese	Third Base	2025	NCBWA
Source:"SEC All-Americas". secsports.com. Archived from the original on May 28, 2008. ABCA: American Baseball Coaches Association BA: Baseball America CB: Collegiate Baseball NCBWA: National Collegiate Baseball Writers Association † Denotes consensus All-American

== Ron Polk Ring of Honor ==
Ron Polk Ring of Honor
Class	Inductee	Source
2019	Jeff Brantley	
2019	Will Clark	
2019	Dave Ferriss	
2019	Dudy Noble	
2019	Rafael Palmeiro	
2020	Eric Dubose	
2020	Paul Gregory	
2020	Bobby Thigpen	
2021	Paul Maholm	
2021	Jonathan Papelbon	
2021	Jay Powell	
2021	Del Unser	
2022	Richard Lee	
2022	Frank Montgomery	
2022	Pete Young	
2023	Mark Gillaspie	
2023	Tommy Raffo	
2023	Ken Tatum	
2024	Jim Ellis	
2024	Buddy Myer	
2024	Bobby Reed	
2025	Ted Milton	
2025	Mitch Moreland	
2025	Mike Proffit	
2026	Nat "Buck" Showalter	
2026	Alex Grammas	
2026	Chris Stratton	

== College Baseball Hall of Fame Inductees ==
Year	Player
2006	Will Clark
2009	Rafael Palmeiro
2009	Ron Polk
2026	Jeff Brantley

== Individual awards ==
=== National awards ===
- Baseball America Freshman of the Year Award

Rafael Palmeiro (1983)

- Golden Spikes Award

Will Clark (1985)

- Baseball America College Coach of the Year

Ron Polk (1985)

- Johnny Bench Award

Ed Easley (2007)

- American Baseball Coaches Association National Player of the Year Award

Tanner Allen (2021)

- Collegiate Baseball Player of the Year Award

Brent Rooker (2017)

- NCBWA National Coach of the Year

Gary Henderson (2018)

- Rawlings Coach of the Year

Gary Henderson (2018)

- Baseball America College Coach of the Year

Chris Lemonis (2021)

== Notable players ==
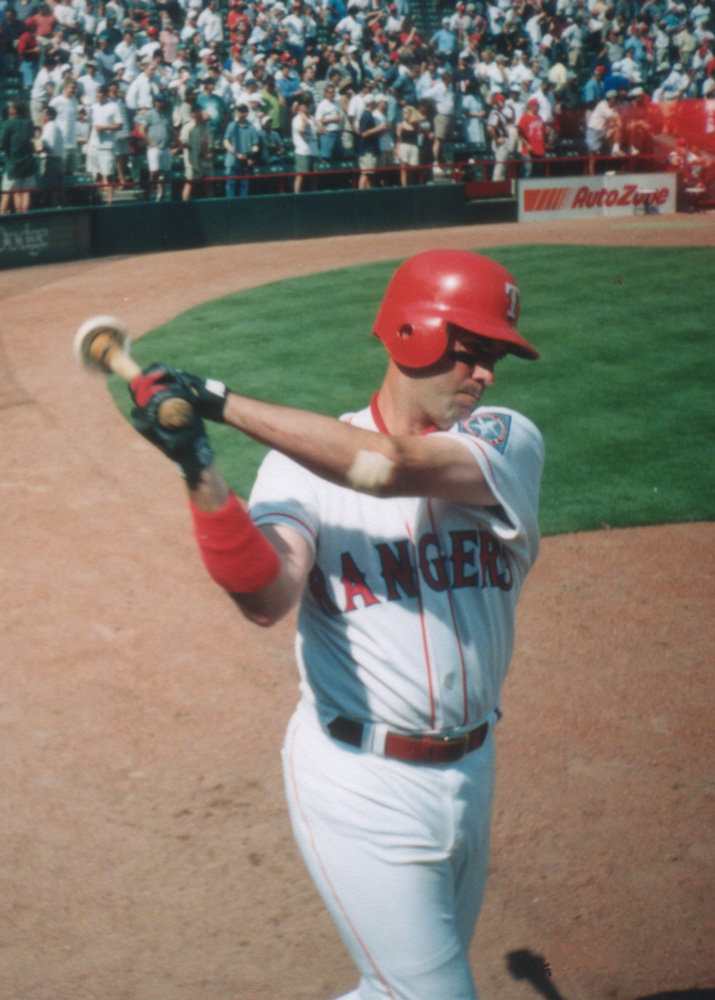
6x All Star Will Clark

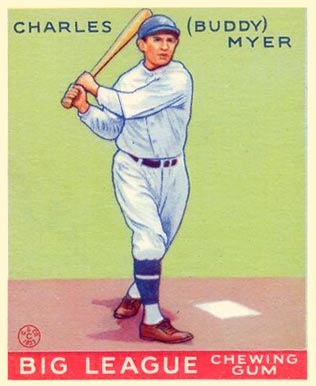
AL Batting Champion and Stolen Base Champion Buddy Myer

- Jeff Brantley
- Will Clark
- John Cohen
- Hughie Critz
- Ed Easley
- Dave "Boo" Ferriss
- Adam Frazier
- Alex Grammas
- Kendall Graveman
- Jonathan Holder
- Dakota Hudson
- Morley Jennings
- Jon Knott
- Jack Lazorko
- Nate Lowe
- Paul Maholm
- Jake Mangum
- Tyler Moore
- Mitch Moreland
- Buddy Myer
- Bob Myrick
- Dudy Noble
- Rafael Palmeiro
- Jonathan Papelbon
- Jay Powell
- Hunter Renfroe
- Brent Rooker
- Buck Showalter
- Chris Stratton
- Craig Tatum
- Bobby Thigpen
- Del Unser
- Brandon Woodruff
- Chris Young

== Coaches ==
Only those who coached three or more seasons and 30 or more games.

Coach	Years	Overall	%	Conf	%	SECT	%	NCAA Post Season					
Coach	Years	Overall	%	Conf	%	SECT	%	Overall	%	Super Reg	%	CWS	%
W. D. Chadwick	1910–1918	120–72–9	.619	57–50–6	.531	—	—	—	—	—	—	—	—
C.R."Dudy"Noble	1920–1947	267–201–9	.569	70–82	.461	—	—	—	—	—	—	—	—
R."Doc"Patty	1948–1956	116–73	.614	78–59	.569	6–3†	.667	2–4	.333	—	—	—	—
Paul Gregory	1957–1974	328–200–1	.621	161–113	.588	9–5†	.643	7–9	.438	—	—	0–2	.000
Ron Polk	1976–1997; 2002–2008	1139–590–2	.659	419–324	.564	44–35	.557	57–44	.564	2–0	1.00	6–12	.333
Pat McMahon	1998–2001	164–88	.651	63–52	.548	8–7	.533	13–10	.565	0–4	.000	1–2	.333
John Cohen	2009–2016	284–203–1	.583	108–130	.454	11–8	.579	18–11	.621	3–4	.429	3–2	.600
Chris Lemonis	2019–2025	232–135	.632	82–89	.480	3–6	.333	18–7	.720	4–1	.800	6–4	.600

† There was no SEC Baseball Tournament before 1977. Records are for the two team playoff that determined the SEC champion.

== Year-by-year results ==
Record table
Season	Coach	Overall	Conference	Standing	Postseason
Independent (1885–1903)
1885	W.J. "Will" Jennings	3–0			
1886	W.J. "Will" Jennings	2–0			
1887	W.J. "Will" Jennings	2–0			
1888	W.J. "Will" Jennings	5–1			
1889	G.C. Creelman	3–0			
1890	G.C. Creelman	4–0			
1891	G.C. Creelman	3–0			
1892	G.C. Creelman	2–0			
1893	G.C. Creelman	2–0–2			
1894	No Team				
1895	G.C. Creelman	1–0–1			
1896	G.C. Creelman	0–2			
1897	unknown	2–1			
1898	No Team				
1899	unknown	1–1			
1900	No Team				
1901	No Team				
1902	S.W. Scales	5–1			
1903	unknown	9–3			
Southern Intercollegiate Athletic Association (1904–1920)
1904	unknown	6–5	4–5		
1905	S.A. Jehl	11–5	4–2		
1906	Bert Noblett	9–8–1	3–2–1		
1907	F.P. Plass	8–6	1–5		
1908	F.P. Plass	19–13–2	4–7		
1909	Dolly Stark	22–4	10–2	1st	
1910	W. D. Chadwick	16–11	2–5		
1911	W. D. Chadwick	16–7	10–6	1st	
1912	W. D. Chadwick	14–8–1	7–7		
1913	W. D. Chadwick	16–10–2	8–6–1		
1914	W. D. Chadwick	11–9–2	5–6–1		
1915	W. D. Chadwick	12–9–2	8–6–2		
1916	W. D. Chadwick	11–7	6–6		
1917	W. D. Chadwick	14–3–2	9–1–2		
1918	W. D. Chadwick	10–8	4–7	1st	
1919	Stanley L. Robinson	13–6	6–4		
1920	Dudy Noble	8–8	6–6		
Southern Conference (1921–1932)
1921	Dudy Noble	13–8	6–6	1st	
1922	Dudy Noble	16–6–3	7–1–1	1st	
1923	Dudy Noble	14–9	11–7		
1924	Dudy Noble	17–7	12–3	1st	
1925	Dudy Noble	19–7	9–5		
1926	Dudy Noble	18–12	10–8		
1927	Dudy Noble	13–8–1	9–7		
1928	Dudy Noble	12–8	7–6		
1929	Dudy Noble	9–6–3	3–5		
1930	Dudy Noble	12–12	6–7		
1931	Dudy Noble	12–9	8–5		
1932	Dudy Noble	8–10	3–5		
Southeastern Conference (1933–present)
1933	Dudy Noble	10–5	3–5	2nd	
1934	Dudy Noble	11–5	8–4	2nd	
1935	Dudy Noble	8–3	8–3	2nd	
1936	Dudy Noble	8–5–1	6–4	3rd	
1937	Dudy Noble	12–3	8–3	3rd	
1938	Dudy Noble	5–7	3–7	10th	
1939	Dudy Noble	7–10	3–10	11th	
1940	Dudy Noble	5–9	4–7	7th	
1941	Dudy Noble	8–9	7–8	7th	
1942	Dudy Noble	8–6–1	6–7	6th	
1943	Dudy Noble	3–9	3–9	T-7th	
1944	No Team				
1945	No Team				
1946	Dudy Noble	3–12	2–9	6th	
1947	Dudy Noble	8–8	7–8	8th	
1948	R. P. "Doc" Patty	17–8	12–5	1st	SEC Championship Series (3–0, Won)
1949	R. P. "Doc" Patty	19–6	13–3	1st	SEC Championship Series (3–1, Won); NCAA District III Tournament (1–2), 3rd
1950	R. P. "Doc" Patty	13–6	9–5	3rd	
1951	R. P. "Doc" Patty	11–9	6–9	T-8th	
1952	R. P. "Doc" Patty	12–11	6–9	T-9th	
1953	R. P. "Doc" Patty	15–7	12–3	2nd	SEC Championship Series (0–2, Lost); NCAA District III Tournament (1–2), 3rd
1954	R. P. "Doc" Patty	9–7	7–7	8th	
1955	R. P. "Doc" Patty	9–10	7–9	T-7th	
1956	R. P. "Doc" Patty	11–9	6–9	9th	
1957	Paul Gregory	13–5	10–5	T-4th	
1958	Paul Gregory	14–10	8–6	5th	
1959	Paul Gregory	12–13	5–10	T-10th	
1960	Paul Gregory	16–11	8–8	7th	
1961	Paul Gregory	12–7	7–6	5th	
1962	Paul Gregory	21–5–1	14–1–1	2nd	SEC Championship Series (1–2, Lost)
1963	Paul Gregory	17–11	9–7	T-4th	
1964	Paul Gregory	17–12	7–7	5th	
1965	Paul Gregory	16–10	11–4	1st	SEC Championship Series (2–1, Won); NCAA District III tournament (1–2)
1966	Paul Gregory	20–11	11–4	1st	SEC Championship Series (2–1, Won); NCAA District III tournament (1–2)
1967	Paul Gregory	17–14	9–9	T-5th	
1968	Paul Gregory	16–17	7–10	8th	
1969	Paul Gregory	20–10	11–7	4th	
1970	Paul Gregory	32–8	11–4	1st	SEC Championship Series (2–1, Won); NCAA District III tournament (2–2)
1971	Paul Gregory	32–12	13–5	1st	SEC Championship Series (2–0, Won); NCAA District III tournament (3–1); College World Series (0–2)
1972	Paul Gregory	24–16	7–11	T-6th	
1973	Paul Gregory	16–14–1	5–9	9th	
1974	Paul Gregory	13–14	8–9	6th	
1975	Jimmy Bragan	16–24	6–16	10th	
1976	Ron Polk	28–17	11–12	T-5th	
1977	Ron Polk	33–15	11–9	T-5th	SEC tournament (1–2, 3rd)
1978	Ron Polk	38–18	13–8	3rd	SEC tournament (3–2, 2nd); NCAA Regional (2–2, 2nd)
1979	Ron Polk	48–12	17–2	1st	SEC tournament (3–0, Won); NCAA Regional (4–1, Won); College World Series (1–2, T-5th)
1980	Ron Polk	31–19	10–11	5th	
1981	Ron Polk	46–17	17–6	1st	SEC tournament (1–2, 3rd); NCAA Regional (3–0, Won); College World Series (1–2, T-5th)
1982	Ron Polk	28–23	11–13	7th	
1983	Ron Polk	42–15	17–5	1st	SEC tournament (2–2, 2nd); NCAA Regional (3–2, 2nd)
1984	Ron Polk	45–16	18–5	2nd	SEC tournament (1–2, 3rd); NCAA Regional (3–2, 2nd)
1985	Ron Polk	50–15	16–8	1st	SEC tournament (3–0, Won); NCAA Regional (3–1, Won); College World Series (2–2, T-3rd)
1986	Ron Polk	34–21	12–15	7th	
1987	Ron Polk	39–22	13–13	6th	SEC tournament (4–0, Won); NCAA Regional (1–2, 4th)
1988	Ron Polk	44–20	17–10	3rd	SEC tournament (3–2, 2nd); NCAA Regional (2–2, 3rd)
1989	Ron Polk	54–14	20–5	1st	SEC tournament (1–2, T-4th); NCAA Regional (4–2, 2nd)
1990	Ron Polk	50–21	17–9	3rd	SEC tournament (4–1, T-1st); NCAA Regional (4–1, Won); College World Series (1–2, T-5th)
1991	Ron Polk	42–21	12–9	3rd	SEC tournament (2–2, 3rd); NCAA Regional (2–2, 3rd)
1992	Ron Polk	40–22	15–9	3rd	SEC tournament (1–2, T-5th); NCAA Regional (2–2, 3rd)
1993	Ron Polk	41–21	17–12	4th	SEC Tournament (West) (3–2, 2nd); NCAA Regional (0–2, T-5th)
1994	Ron Polk	36–23	15–12	4th	SEC Tournament (West) (2–2, 3rd)
1995	Ron Polk	34–25	11–16	9th	SEC Tournament (West) (1–2, 5th)
1996	Ron Polk	38–24	17–13	5th	SEC tournament (1–2, T-5th); NCAA Regional (1–2, 4th)
1997	Ron Polk	47–21	19–11	3rd	SEC tournament (1–2, T-5th); NCAA Regional (5–1, Won); College World Series (1–2, T-5th)
1998	Pat McMahon	42–23	14–15	6th	SEC tournament (2–2, T-3rd); NCAA Regional (4–1, Won); College World Series (1–2, T-5th)
1999	Pat McMahon	42–21	15–13	6th	SEC tournament (2–2, T-3rd); NCAA Regional (2–2, 2nd)
2000	Pat McMahon	41–20	17–10	4th	SEC tournament (0–2, T-7th); NCAA Regional (3–1, Won); NCAA Super Regional (0–2, Lost)
2001	Pat McMahon	39–24	17–13	T-4th	SEC tournament (4–0, Won); NCAA Regional (3–0, Won); NCAA Super Regional (0–2, Lost)
2002	Ron Polk	34–24–1	14–15	7th	SEC tournament (1–2, T-5th)
2003	Ron Polk	42–20–1	17–12	4th	SEC tournament (2–2, T-3rd); NCAA Regional (2–2, 2nd)
2004	Ron Polk	35–24	13–17	9th	NCAA Regional (1–2, 3rd)
2005	Ron Polk	42–22	13–16	7th	SEC tournament (4–0, Won); NCAA Regional (2–2, 2nd)
2006	Ron Polk	37–23	12–17	9th	NCAA Regional (2–2, 2nd)
2007	Ron Polk	38–22	15–13	4th	SEC tournament (0–2, T-7th); NCAA Regional (3–0, Won); NCAA Super Regional (2–0, Won); College World Series (0–2, T-7th)
2008	Ron Polk	23–33	9–21	12th	
2009	John Cohen	25–29	9–20	12th	
2010	John Cohen	23–33	6–24	11th	
2011	John Cohen	38–25	14–16	6th	SEC tournament (0–2, T-7th); NCAA Regional (3–0, Won); NCAA Super Regional (1–2, Lost)
2012	John Cohen	40–24	16–14	T-5th	SEC tournament (5–1, Won); NCAA Regional (1–2, 3rd)
2013	John Cohen	51–20	16–14	5th	SEC tournament (3–1, T-3rd); NCAA Regional (3–1, Won); NCAA Super Regional (2–0, Won); College World Series (3–2, 2nd)
2014	John Cohen	39–24	18–12	T-3rd	SEC tournament (2–2, T-5th); NCAA Regional (2–2, 2nd)
2015	John Cohen	24–30	8–22	14th	
2016	John Cohen	44–18–1	21–9	1st	SEC tournament (1–2, T-5th); NCAA Regional (3–0, Won) (#6 National Seed); NCAA Super Regional (0–2, Lost)
2017	Andy Cannizaro	40–27	17–13	5th	SEC tournament (2–2, T-5th); NCAA Regional (4–1, Won); NCAA Super Regional (0–2, Lost)
2018	Andy Cannizaro; Gary Henderson	39–29	15–15	T-7th	SEC tournament (0–1, T-9th); NCAA Regional (4–1, Won); NCAA Super Regional (2–1, Won); College World Series (2–2, T-3rd)
2019	Chris Lemonis	52–15	20–10	T-3rd	SEC tournament (1–2, T-5th); NCAA Regional (3–0, Won) (#6 National Seed); NCAA Super Regional (2–0, Won); College World Series (1–2, T-5th)
2020	Chris Lemonis	12–4	0–0		Season canceled by NCAA†
2021	Chris Lemonis	50–18	20–10	T-2nd	SEC tournament (0–2, T-7th); NCAA Regional (3–0, Won) (#7 National Seed); NCAA Super Regional (2–1, Won); College World Series (5–2, Won)
2022	Chris Lemonis	26–30	9–21	14th	
2023	Chris Lemonis	27–26	9–21	13th	
2024	Chris Lemonis	40–23	17–13	T-5th	SEC tournament (2–2, T-5th); NCAA Regional (2–2, 2nd)
2025	Chris Lemonis; Justin Parker	36–23	15–15	T-10th	SEC tournament (0–1, T-13th); NCAA Regional (2–2, 2nd)
2026	Brian O'Connor	43–19	16–14	8th	SEC tournament (1–1, T-5th); NCAA Regional (3–0, Won) (#14 National Seed); NCAA Super Regional (0–2, Lost)
Total:		2,931–1,721–29			
National champion Postseason invitational champion Conference regular season champion Conference regular season and conference tournament champion Division regular season champion Division regular season and conference tournament champion Conference tournament champion

†NCAA canceled all postseason activities for all college sports due to the COVID-19 virus.

=== 50+ Win Seasons ===
Year	Coach	W	L	SEC Champ	SECT Champ	Postseason Result	CWS Final Rank	CWS record	Total Postseason Record†
1985	Ron Polk	50	15	✔	✔	College World Series	3rd	2–2	5–3
1989	Ron Polk	54	14	✔		Regionals	N/A	N/A	4–2
1990	Ron Polk	50	21		✔	College World Series	5th	1–2	5–3
2013	John Cohen	51	20			College World Series Runner-Up	2nd	3–2	8–3
2019	Chris Lemonis	52	15	††		College World Series	T-5th	1–2	6–2
2021	Chris Lemonis	50	18			College World Series Champions	1st	5–2	10–3

† Does not include SEC Tourney Record
†† Division Champ

=== All-time record vs. SEC teams ===
Opponent	Won	Lost	Tied	Percentage	First	Last
Alabama	211	216	4	.494	1896	2025
Arkansas	59	61	0	.492	1960	2026
Auburn	122	102	1	.544	1908	2026
Florida	52	73	0	.416	1923	2025
Georgia	53	57	0	.482	1915	2026
Kentucky	68	44	0	.607	1925	2025
LSU	222	197	1	.530	1907	2026
Missouri	17	7	0	.708	2003	2026
Mississippi	272	213	5	.560	1893	2026
Oklahoma	4	6	1	.409	1992	2025
South Carolina	43	43	0	.500	1981	2026
Tennessee	60	41	0	.594	1907	2026
Texas	8	11	0	.421	1922	2026
Texas A&M	25	25	0	.500	1907	2026
Vanderbilt	79	59	2	.571	1913	2026
Totals	1295	1155	14	.528		

== Rivalries ==
In baseball, MSU has two main rivals, LSU and Ole Miss.

Against LSU, the Bulldogs hold a 222–197 all-time series lead over LSU in a series that got its start in 1907.

Against Ole Miss, Mississippi State leads the series 272–213–5. Retired Mississippi State head baseball coach, Ron Polk, was 85–49 against Ole Miss. John Cohen, MSU's former coach, was 8–11 in SEC Conference games and 11–17 overall against Ole Miss. Andy Cannizaro was 4–0 against Ole Miss in 2017. Gary Henderson was 3–1 against Mississippi in 2018, while Chris Lemonis had a 16–8 mark. The two teams play a 3-game series each year that counts in the SEC standings and one non-conference game in Jackson, MS. The game in Jackson was called the Mayor's Trophy from 1980 to 2006, and from 2007 to present the game has been called the Governor's Cup. The Mayor's Trophy series ended 14–13 in favor of the Rebels. With the 2007 season, the non-conference meeting between the two teams moved to Trustmark Park in Pearl, Mississippi – which was formerly home to the Mississippi Braves. Mississippi State holds the lead in the Governor's Cup 11–6.

== See also ==
- List of NCAA Division I baseball programs
