= 1990 Mississippi State Bulldogs baseball team =

American college baseball season

1990 Mississippi State Bulldogs baseball

SEC Tournament co-champions NCAA South II Regional champions

College World Series, 1–2
- Conference: Southeastern Conference
- CB: No. 5
- Record: 50–21 (17–9 SEC)
- Head coach: Ron Polk (15th season)
- Home stadium: Dudy Noble Field

1990 Southeastern Conference baseball standings
	Conf.				Overall
Team	W		L	PCT	W		L	PCT
No. 4 LSU ‍†‍‡‍^{y}	20	–	7	.741	54	–	19	.740
No. 1 Georgia ‍‍‍^{y}	18	–	9	.667	52	–	19	.732
No. 5 Mississippi State ‍‍‡‍^{y}	17	–	9	.654	50	–	21	.704
Auburn ‍‍‍	13	–	13	.500	34	–	24	.586
Vanderbilt ‍‍‍	12	–	13	.480	28	–	30	.483
Florida ‍‍‍	11	–	12	.478	29	–	30	.492
Alabama ‍‍‍	10	–	13	.435	34	–	21	.618
Ole Miss ‍‍‍	10	–	16	.385	23	–	29	.442
Tennessee ‍‍‍	9	–	18	.333	28	–	31	.475
Kentucky ‍‍‍	8	–	18	.308	27	–	29	.482
† – Conference champion ‡ – Tournament champion y – Invited to the NCAA tournament As of June 30, 1990; Rankings from Collegiate Baseball

The 1990 Mississippi State Bulldogs baseball team represented Mississippi State University in the 1990 NCAA Division I baseball season. They were led by head coach Ron Polk in his fifteenth season and played their home games at Dudy Noble Field. The Bulldogs were members of the Southeastern Conference, and finished with a record of 50–21, third in the SEC with a record of 17–9. They were named co-champions of the SEC Tournament after rain ended the final game against LSU in the fourth inning.

Mississippi State was invited to the NCAA Tournament, where they won the South II Regional to advance to their fifth College World Series. The Bulldogs tied for fifth, recording a win against Georgia Southern and losses to eventual champion Georgia and semifinalist Stanford.

== Personnel ==
=== Roster ===
1990 Mississippi State Bulldogs roster
Pitchers: 7 - Chuck Daniel - Sophomore; 8 - Tracy Jobes - Senior; 16 - Tim Henderson - Senior; 17 - Jon Harden - Sophomore; 20 - Bobby Reed - Junior; 32 - Chris George - Sophomore; 35 - B. J. Wallace - Freshman; 40 - Damon Gardner - Freshman; 43 - Rob Norman - Junior	Catchers: 13 - Steve Polk - Senior; 15 - Jim Robinson - Junior; Outfielders: 11 - John Cohen - Senior; 19 - Jimmy Gamraill - Junior; 21 - Tracy Echols - Senior; 27 - Rex Buckner - Freshman; 42 - David Mitchell - Senior; 44 - Joey Hamilton - Junior	Infielders: 2 - Scott Mitchell - Senior; 3 - Jon Shave - Senior; 14 - Charlie Anderson - Sophomore; 22 - Tommy Raffo - Senior; 23 - Burke Masters - Senior

=== Coaching staff ===
1990 Mississippi State Bulldogs coaching staff
- 1 - Ron Polk - Head coach – 15th season
- 2 - Joe Hudak - Assistant coach- 2nd season
- 34 - Steve Smith - Assistant coach - 1st season

== Schedule ==
Legend
	Mississippi State win
	Mississippi State loss
*	Non-Conference game

1990 Mississippi State Bulldogs baseball game log
Regular season

February
Date	Opponent	Site/stadium	Score	Overall record	SEC record
Feb 16	vs LSU*	Louisiana Superdome • New Orleans, LA (Busch Challenge IV)	L 6–7	0–1	
Feb 17	vs New Orleans*	Louisiana Superdome • New Orleans, LA (Busch Challenge IV)	L 2–3	0–2	
Feb 18	vs Tulane*	Louisiana Superdome • New Orleans, LA (Busch Challenge IV)	W 7–4	1–2	
Feb 24	Birmingham–Southern*	Dudy Noble Field • Starkville, MS	W 7–0	2–2	
Feb 25	Jackson State*	Dudy Noble Field • Starkville, MS	W 4–1	3–2	
Feb 27	South Alabama*	Dudy Noble Field • Starkville, MS	L 3–7	3–3	
Feb 28	South Alabama*	Dudy Noble Field • Starkville, MS	W 3–2	4–3	

March
Date	Opponent	Site/stadium	Score	Overall record	SEC record
Mar 3	Memphis*	Dudy Noble Field • Starkville, MS	W 9–1	5–3	
Mar 4	Memphis*	Dudy Noble Field • Starkville, MS	L 2–4	5–4	
Mar 9	Louisiana Tech*	Dudy Noble Field • Starkville, MS	W 10–0	6–4	
Mar 9	Louisiana Tech*	Dudy Noble Field • Starkville, MS	W 6–1	7–4	
Mar 10	at William Carey*	Hattiesburg, MS	W 4–0	8–4	
Mar 11	at William Carey*	Hattiesburg, MS	W 13–3	9–4	
Mar 13	Illinois State*	Dudy Noble Field • Starkville, MS	W 9–8	10–4	
Mar 14	Illinois State*	Dudy Noble Field • Starkville, MS	W 12–4	11–4	
Mar 17	LSU	Dudy Noble Field • Starkville, MS	L 5–6	11–5	0–1
Mar 17	LSU	Dudy Noble Field • Starkville, MS	W 2–1	12–5	1–1
Mar 18	LSU	Dudy Noble Field • Starkville, MS	W 10–9 ^{(13)}	13–5	2–1
Mar 20	at New Orleans*	Privateer Park • New Orleans, LA	W 5–4 ^{(10)}	14–5	
Mar 21	at New Orleans*	Privateer Park • New Orleans, LA	L 1–5	14–6	
Mar 24	at Alabama	Sewell–Thomas Stadium • Tuscaloosa, AL	L 4–7	14–7	2–2
Mar 24	at Alabama	Sewell–Thomas Stadium • Tuscaloosa, AL	W 4–2	15–7	3–2
Mar 25	at Alabama	Sewell–Thomas Stadium • Tuscaloosa, AL	W 10–6	16–7	4–2
Mar 31	Kentucky	Dudy Noble Field • Starkville, MS	W 3–0	17–7	5–2
Mar 31	Kentucky	Dudy Noble Field • Starkville, MS	W 9–2	18–7	6–2

April
Date	Opponent	Site/stadium	Score	Overall record	SEC record
Apr 1	Kentucky	Dudy Noble Field • Starkville, MS	W 8–0	19–7	7–2
Apr 3	vs Ole Miss*	Smith–Wills Stadium • Jackson, MS (Mayor's Trophy)	W 4–1	20–7	
Apr 4	Southern Miss*	Dudy Noble Field • Starkville, MS	L 2–4	20–8	
Apr 5	Southern Miss*	Dudy Noble Field • Starkville, MS	W 10–5	21–8	
Apr 7	at Auburn	Plainsman Park • Auburn, AL	L 5–15	21–9	7–3
Apr 7	at Auburn	Plainsman Park • Auburn, AL	W 13–0	22–9	8–3
Apr 8	at Auburn	Plainsman Park • Auburn, AL	L 4–8	22–10	8–4
Apr 10	vs Jackson State*	Smith–Wills Stadium • Jackson, MS	W 9–4	23–10	
Apr 11	Delta State*	Dudy Noble Field • Starkville, MS	W 15–14 ^{(12)}	24–10	
Apr 11	Delta State*	Dudy Noble Field • Starkville, MS	W 24–2	25–10	
Apr 13	at Florida	Alfred A. McKethan Stadium • Gainesville, FL	L 9–10 ^{(10)}	25–11	8–5
Apr 14	at Florida	Alfred A. McKethan Stadium • Gainesville, FL	W 18–4	26–11	9–5
Apr 14	at Florida	Alfred A. McKethan Stadium • Gainesville, FL	W 7–2	27–11	10–5
Apr 18	Northeast Louisiana*	Dudy Noble Field • Starkville, MS	W 5–3	28–11	
Apr 18	Northeast Louisiana*	Dudy Noble Field • Starkville, MS	W 5–3	29–11	
Apr 19	North Alabama*	Dudy Noble Field • Starkville, MS	L 3–10	29–12	
Apr 21	Vanderbilt	Dudy Noble Field • Starkville, MS	L 2–4	29–13	10–6
Apr 21	Vanderbilt	Dudy Noble Field • Starkville, MS	W 8–6	30–13	11–6
Apr 22	Vanderbilt	Dudy Noble Field • Starkville, MS	W 12–4	31–13	12–6
Apr 24	at Mississippi College*	Frierson Field • Clinton, MS	W 8–5	32–13	
Apr 25	at Southern Miss*	Pete Taylor Park • Hattiesburg, MS	L 5–8	32–14	
Apr 26	Mississippi College*	Dudy Noble Field • Starkville, MS	W 24–3	33–14	
Apr 26	Mississippi College*	Dudy Noble Field • Starkville, MS	W 12–1	34–14	
Apr 28	Georgia	Dudy Noble Field • Starkville, MS	L 0–9	34–15	12–7
Apr 28	Georgia	Dudy Noble Field • Starkville, MS	L 1–12	34–16	12–8
Apr 29	Georgia	Dudy Noble Field • Starkville, MS	W 22–6	35–16	13–8
Apr 30	Livingston*	Dudy Noble Field • Starkville, MS	W 7–4	36–16	

May
Date	Opponent	Site/stadium	Score	Overall record	SEC record
May 1	Belhaven*	Dudy Noble Field • Starkville, MS	W 5–0	37–16	
May 5	at Tennessee	Lower Hudson Field • Knoxville, TN	W 13–3	38–16	14–8
May 5	at Tennessee	Lower Hudson Field • Knoxville, TN	W 9–0	39–16	15–8
May 6	at Tennessee	Lower Hudson Field • Knoxville, TN	L 2–6	39–17	15–9
May 13	at Ole Miss	Swayze Field • Oxford, MS	W 17–0	40–17	16–9
May 13	at Ole Miss	Swayze Field • Oxford, MS	W 9–0	41–17	17–9

Postseason

SEC Tournament
Date	Opponent	Seed	Site/stadium	Score	Overall record	SECT record
May 17	(4) Auburn	(3)	Hoover Metropolitan Stadium • Hoover, AL	W 16–2	42–17	1–0
May 18	(1) LSU	(3)	Hoover Metropolitan Stadium • Hoover, AL	L 8–17	42–18	1–1
May 19	(6) Florida	(3)	Hoover Metropolitan Stadium • Hoover, AL	W 8–2	43–18	2–1
May 19	(5) Vanderbilt	(3)	Hoover Metropolitan Stadium • Hoover, AL	W 17–9	44–18	3–1
May 20	(1) LSU	(3)	Hoover Metropolitan Stadium • Hoover, AL	W 3–1	45–18	4–1

NCAA South II Regional
Date	Opponent	Seed	Site/stadium	Score	Overall record	Regional record
May 24	(5) BYU	(2)	Dudy Noble Field • Starkville, MS	W 16–5	46–18	1–0
May 25	(3) Illinois	(2)	Dudy Noble Field • Starkville, MS	W 5–3	47–18	2–0
May 26	(1) Florida State	(2)	Dudy Noble Field • Starkville, MS	W 11–8	48–18	3–0
May 27	(1) Florida State	(2)	Dudy Noble Field • Starkville, MS	L 9–11	48–19	3–1
May 28	(1) Florida State	(2)	Dudy Noble Field • Starkville, MS	W 4–3	49–19	4–1

College World Series
Date	Opponent	Seed	Site/stadium	Score	Overall record	CWS record
June 1	(5) Georgia	(4)	Johnny Rosenblatt Stadium • Omaha, NE	L 0–3	49–20	0–1
June 3	(8) Georgia Southern	(4)	Johnny Rosenblatt Stadium • Omaha, NE	W 15–1	50–20	1–1
June 5	(1) Stanford	(4)	Johnny Rosenblatt Stadium • Omaha, NE	L 1–6	50–21	1–2
