= Rafael Palmeiro =

Cuban-American baseball player (born 1964)

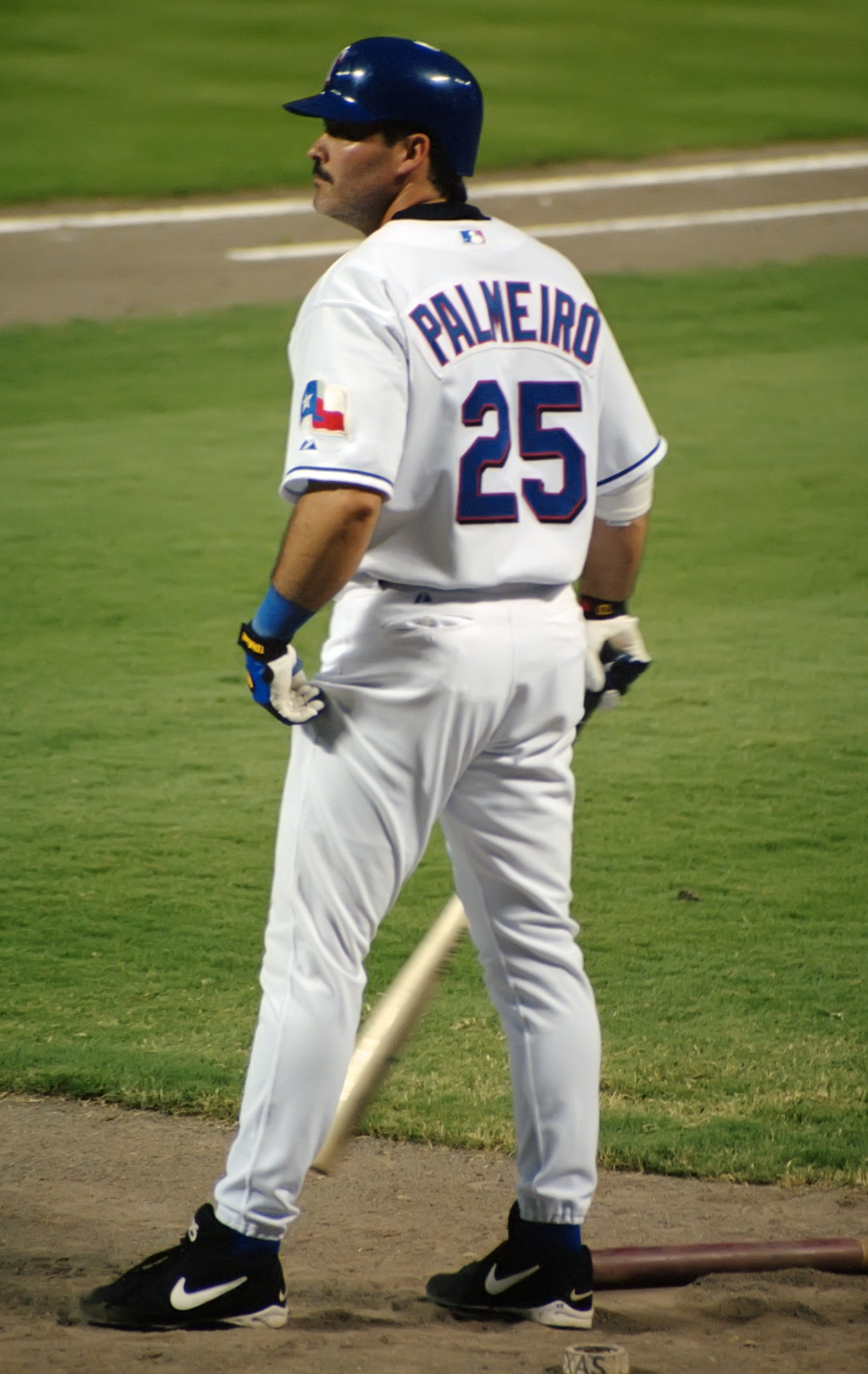
- Palmeiro with the Texas Rangers in 2003
- First baseman
- Born: September 24, 1964 (age 62); Havana, Cuba
- Batted: Left Threw: Left

MLB debut
- September 8, 1986, for the Chicago Cubs

Last MLB appearance
- August 30, 2005, for the Baltimore Orioles

MLB statistics
- Batting average: .288
- Hits: 3,020
- Home runs: 569
- Runs batted in: 1,835
- Stats at Baseball Reference

Teams
- Chicago Cubs (1986–1988); Texas Rangers (1989–1993); Baltimore Orioles (1994–1998); Texas Rangers (1999–2003); Baltimore Orioles (2004–2005)

Career highlights and awards
- 4× All-Star (1988, 1991, 1998, 1999); 3× Gold Glove Award (1997–1999); 2× Silver Slugger Award (1998, 1999)

Member of the National College

Baseball Hall of Fame
- Induction: 2009

Rafael Palmeiro Corrales (born September 24, 1964) is a Cuban-American former professional baseball first baseman and left fielder. He played 20 seasons in Major League Baseball (MLB) for three teams. Palmeiro was an All-American at Mississippi State University before being drafted by the Chicago Cubs in 1985. He played for the Cubs (1986–1988), Texas Rangers (1989–1993, 1999–2003), and the Baltimore Orioles (1994–1998, 2004–2005).

He was named to the MLB All-Star Team four times, and won the Gold Glove three times. He is one of only seven players in MLB history to be a member of both the 500 home run club and the 3,000 hit club. Days after recording his 3,000th hit, Palmeiro received a 10-game suspension for testing positive for an anabolic steroid.

== Early life ==
Palmeiro was born in Havana, Cuba, but moved to the United States at the age of seven. He graduated from Miami Jackson High School in Miami, Florida. Although he was drafted by the New York Mets in the 8th round of the 1982 draft, he did not sign.

== College career ==
Palmeiro was recruited by Ron Polk and enrolled at Mississippi State University, where he played college baseball for the Bulldogs in the Southeastern Conference (SEC). He was the first of two players to have ever won the SEC triple crown, both of whom are Mississippi State products. A teammate of Will Clark, the two were known as "Thunder and Lightning".

Clark and Palmeiro were known to dislike each other, dating back to their time at Mississippi State. On June 11, 1985, Palmeiro signed with the Chicago Cubs as the 22nd pick in the 1st round of the 1985 draft. He was drafted as a compensation pick from the San Diego Padres, to whom the Cubs lost Tim Stoddard via free agency.

== Minor league career (1985–1987) ==
In 1985, Palmeiro played with the Peoria Chiefs of the Class A level Midwest League. In his first professional season, Palmeiro batted .297 with 5 home runs and 51 RBI in 73 games. He played exclusively in the outfield. Palmeiro played for the Pittsfield Cubs of the Class AA level Eastern League in 1986. With Pittsfield, Palmeiro played exclusively in the outfield and hit .306 with 12 home runs and 95 RBI in 140 games, before a September call up to the major leagues. In 1987, Palmeiro played for the Iowa Cubs of the Class AAA level American Association. In 57 games Palmeiro hit .299 with 11 home runs and 41 RBI before being called up the major leagues. He played the outfield in 47 games and made his debut at 1B, playing 9 games.

== Major league career ==
=== Chicago Cubs (1986–1988) ===
Palmeiro debuted on September 8, 1986, in a game between the Chicago Cubs and Philadelphia Phillies at Wrigley Field, as a left fielder. In his first season, he played 22 games, having a .247 batting average while having 12 RBIs and 3 home runs. In the next season, he played in 84 games, garnering 61 hits, 14 home runs and 30 RBIs with a .276 average. During his tenure with the Cubs, he normally played left field, though occasionally he would play other outfield positions or first base. Palmeiro was the runner up to National League batting champion Tony Gwynn in 1988 with a .307 batting average, only six points below Gwynn's. He had 178 hits, 8 home runs and 53 RBIs in 629 plate appearances and 152 games. He was named to the 1988 MLB All-Star Game, the first in his career.

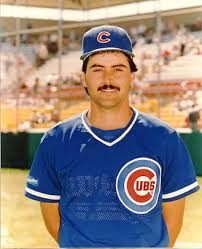
Palmeiro with the Chicago Cubs.

In the 1988 offseason, the Cubs were craving a reliever and knew they had to trade one of their young aspiring stars, with reports signaling potentially trading Shawon Dunston. With the emergence Mark Grace at first base and the possibility of keeping Palmeiro at left field, the Cubs decided to swing for a reliever by trading Palmeiro. In December 1988, Palmeiro was traded by the Cubs to the Texas Rangers along with Jamie Moyer and Drew Hall in exchange for Mitch Williams, Paul Kilgus, Steve Wilson, Curtis Wilkerson, Luis Benitez, and Pablo Delgado. Palmeiro immediately trashed the trade, referring to Cubs GM Jim Frey and manager Don Zimmer as people who "don’t know what they’re doing. These guys in the front office . . . it’s going straight down, it seems like.” As for the Rangers, GM Tom Grieve stated, “Raffy was the guy we wanted. We wanted a guy who could hit the toughest pitchers and we thought Raffy was the guy. Nothing against Grace, but if they had asked us to do it for him, I don’t know that we would have. We liked Raffy.”

=== Texas Rangers (1989–1993) ===
Upon moving to the American League, Palmeiro was primarily used as a first baseman or designated hitter. Palmeiro blossomed as a hitter while with the Rangers, leading the league in hits in 1990 and doubles in 1991. In 1989, he hit for .275 that season, having 64 RBIs, 8 home runs and 154 hits. In 1990, he was third in the American League in batting. He hit for .319 during the season, while having 89 RBIs and 14 home runs and leading the league in hits (191). He hit 49 doubles in 1991 (a season high along with a career high), while having 203 hits, 26 home runs and 88 RBIs for a .322 batting average. He was named to his second career All-Star Game that year. He dipped in every category in 1992, having 163 hits, 22 home runs, 85 RBIs and a .268 batting average.

He bounced back the following year (a contract season) with a career high 124 runs (leading the American League that year), 176 hits, a then-career high 37 home runs along with 105 RBIs and a .295 batting average. He was offered a five-year contract worth $26 million after the season, however the Rangers ultimately signed Palmiero's ex-Mississippi State teammate Will Clark instead for $30 million and five years, causing Palmeiro to call Clark a "low life", though he later apologized. Palmiero soon signed with the Baltimore Orioles in December 1993.

=== Baltimore Orioles (1994–1998) ===
Palmeiro signed a 5-year contract, worth more than $30 million. In his first season as an Oriole, Palmeiro hit 23 home runs, a season that was abbreviated due to a work stoppage. He had 76 RBIs (the last time he would have less than 100 RBIs until 2004) along with a .319 batting average. Prior to Palmeiro's 1995 season, he had hit more than 30 home runs only once (37 in 1993).

Starting in 1995, Palmeiro began a streak of 38+ home run years that continued through the 2003 season. He hit 373 home runs during this nine-season span, while also driving in over 100 runs in each of these seasons. However, Palmeiro never led the league in home runs, and he is history's most prolific home run hitter to have never won the home run crown.

That season, he led the team in home runs, batting average, and runs batted in. In the 1996 season, he hit 39 home runs, 181 hits, and 142 runs batted in and helped the Orioles qualify for the American League Wild Card. This was both his first postseason appearance in his career along with the first postseason appearance for the Orioles since 1983. In his first postseason, he had seven total hits, six RBIs and a combined .205 average while playing in all nine games the Orioles played, as they beat the Cleveland Indians in the 1996 American League Division Series to advance to the 1996 American League Championship Series before being beat by the New York Yankees. He finished 6th in MVP balloting, his highest finish up to that point in his career.

Despite having 109 strikeouts (a career high) and a .254 batting average, he had 110 RBIs, 156 hits along with 38 home runs in 1997 as he helped the team win their division for the first time since 1983. He also was awarded the Rawlings Gold Glove Award that season, his first ever. In the 1997 American League Division Series, the Orioles beat the Seattle Mariners in four games. In the postseason, he had 10 combined hits along with 2 RBIs and 1 home run and a .265 average in the 10 games he played in the postseason, as the Orioles once again advanced to the ALCS after beating the Seattle Mariners before losing to the Indians in six games. This would be the last time the Orioles would make the playoffs until 2012 and last time they would win a division title until 2014. The next season, his last with his first stint with the Orioles, he hit 43 home runs, to lead the team for the 4th time. He had 183 hits along with 121 RBIs and a .296 batting average. He was named to the 1998 MLB All-Star Game, his first since 1991. He also won a Gold Glove for the second straight year along with his first Silver Slugger Award, while finishing 18th in MVP balloting. In his time with the Orioles, he received MVP votes each year, though he never finished higher than 6th.

=== Texas Rangers (1999–2003) ===
Palmeiro was offered a 5-year, $50 million deal to stay with the Orioles, but instead agreed to a 5-year, $45 million contract to return to the Rangers in 1999, citing a desire to be close to family (he had remained in the Dallas area during his time with the Orioles).

Palmeiro played an average of 157 games per season in his second tenure with the Rangers. He had 47 home runs in his first season back with the Rangers, while hitting for .324 and having 183 hits. He finished 5th in the MVP balloting, his highest finish ever while being named to the 1999 MLB All-Star Game, his fourth and final selection. He was awarded the Gold Glove for the third straight year along with winning the Silver Slugger Award for his second straight and final year. The Gold Glove win was not without controversy, as he appeared in only 28 games as a first baseman while playing 128 games as the designated hitter. He finished 5th in the MVP balloting, having garnered a .324 batting average, 47 home runs, and 148 RBIs, all improvements from the previous season. He hit over 100 RBIs in each of his five seasons, along with 805 hits. He hit 214 home runs with the team in that span, though his batting average dipped each year, hitting .260 in his final year in 2003. His first season resulted in a division title. In the 1999 American League Division Series, his team was swept by the Yankees in three games. He had three hits and a .273 average for the series. This was his last postseason appearance. The team would finish last place in his remaining four seasons. Palmeiro was one of the few bright spots for the Rangers from 2000 to 2003, when he left the Rangers to re-join the Orioles. On May 11, 2003, Palmeiro hit his 500th home run off David Elder in a game against the Cleveland Indians.

When he departed the team, he led the team in games played (1,573), walks (805) and runs (958) and was in the top two for hits (1,692), home runs (321) and RBIs (1,039).

=== Baltimore Orioles (2004–2005) ===
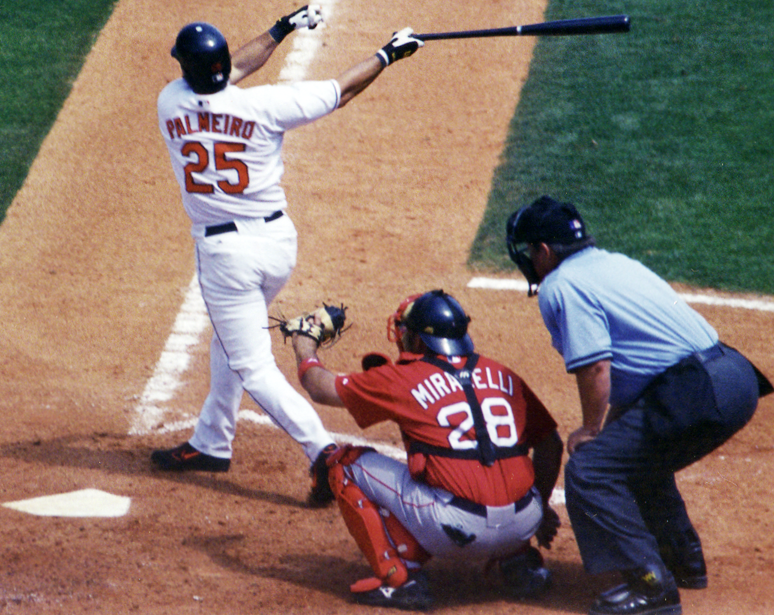
Palmeiro in a Spring training game for the Baltimore Orioles against the Boston Red Sox, 2005.

Palmeiro re-signed with the Baltimore Orioles in 2004, on a 1-year, $4 million contract. In his press conference, he claimed he was "a little bit older, a little bit wiser". He also said he didn't want to retire until he rejoined the Orioles and if he was inducted to the Hall of Fame, he would do so as an Oriole. His power fell significantly his first season back with the Orioles, having 142 hits, along with 23 home runs, 88 RBIs and a .258 batting average, all drops from the previous season. Despite this, he became just the third player at the time (the other two being Jimmie Foxx and Mark McGwire in history to hit at least 200 home runs for two different clubs, doing so on September 13, 2004, off Justin Miller. Entering 2005, he was just 78 hits shy of 3,000. Prior to a May 4 game, he was asked to provide a urine sample for a drug test, which soon was confirmed to contain stanozolol, an anabolic steroid that soon saw him informed of this by the MLBPA that would lead to a subsequent hearing over the matter. He hit his 563rd home run that season, passing Reggie Jackson on the all-time list.

Just a few weeks later, on July 15, Palmeiro joined Hank Aaron, Willie Mays, Alex Rodriguez, and Eddie Murray as the only players in major league history to get 3,000 hits and 500 home runs, doing so with a double against the Seattle Mariners at Safeco Field off Joel Piñeiro. He was only the third player born outside of the United States to achieve the milestone after Roberto Clemente and Rod Carew and the first Cuban to do so. Shortly afterwards, Palmeiro was suspended 10 days for testing positive for steroids. He claimed he received a tainted vitamin b12 shot from Miguel Tejada. He also claimed that he regularly received B-12 shots as an energy boost when with the Rangers from the team physician while the Baltimore doctors would not do so.

Upon returning he only played seven more games, during which he was booed by the home fans. He was sent home due to a nagging injury, but was told to stay home – largely because of his attempt to implicate his teammate. In his final season, he had 98 hits, 18 home runs, 60 RBIs and a .266 batting average in 110 total games played. He finished his career with 2,831 games played, the most by any player who never played in the World Series.

=== Career statistics ===
In 2,831 games over 20 seasons, Palmeiro posted a .288 batting average (3,020-for-10,472) with 1,663 runs, 585 doubles, 38 triples, 569 home runs, 1,835 RBI, 97 stolen bases, 1,353 bases on balls, .371 on-base percentage and .515 slugging percentage. Defensively, he finished his career with a .994 fielding percentage primarily as a first baseman. He also played 213 games in the outfield, 209 as a left fielder. In 22 postseason games, he batted .244 (20-for-82) with 13 runs, 5 doubles, 4 home runs, 8 RBI and 6 walks. In the years of his career (1986-2005), nobody had more hits than Palmeiro.

=== Sugar Land Skeeters (2015) ===
On September 17, 2015, it was announced that Palmeiro would sign with the Sugar Land Skeeters of the Atlantic League of Professional Baseball to play alongside his son, Patrick Palmeiro, for one game. Palmeiro appeared in only one game for the Skeeters on September 18, 2015. Skeeter fans quickly gave him the nickname "The Saccharin Slugger."

=== Coming out of retirement (2018) ===
Palmeiro announced on January 5, 2018, that he wanted to return to Major League Baseball. On May 9, 2018, it was announced that Palmeiro and his son Patrick signed with the Cleburne Railroaders of the American Association of Independent Professional Baseball. On May 22, 2018, he hit his first professional home run since July 2005 when he was with the Orioles. He finished the season with a .301 batting average, 6 home runs, and 22 RBIs despite being limited to only 31 games due to injuries. On March 11, 2019, the Railroaders announced that Palmeiro and his son would return for the 2019 season. On May 15, the Railroaders released the pair, stating that Rafael was not fully healthy and would not be able to play a full season after undergoing knee surgery earlier in the year.

== Post-career honors ==
Palmeiro was inducted into the Mississippi State University Hall of Fame on October 11, 2008. He was inducted into the National College Baseball Hall of Fame in 2009 and the Mississippi Sports Hall of Fame in 2012.

Palmeiro became eligible for induction into the Baseball Hall of Fame in 2011. He received 64 votes, or 11% of total ballots cast; the threshold for entry is 75%. According to Barry M. Bloom on Major League Baseball's official website: "Palmeiro should have been a sure-fire first-ballot inductee, as a member of the 500-homer, 3,000-hit club, but was suspended in 2005 after testing positive for steroid use. He received only 11 percent of the vote." On January 8, 2014, Palmeiro received insufficient support to remain on the Hall of Fame ballot in future years, when he appeared on only 4.4% of ballots. He was considered again by the Veterans Committee in 2023 but received less than four out of sixteen votes.

== Steroids ==
Former Rangers teammate José Canseco identified Palmeiro as a fellow steroid user in his 2005 book, Juiced: Wild Times, Rampant 'Roids, Smash Hits & How Baseball Got Big, and claimed he personally injected Palmeiro with steroids, stating that he introduced Palmeiro to steroids when they were teammates (the two played together in the 1992 and 1993 seasons). On March 17, 2005, Palmeiro appeared at a Congressional hearing about steroids in baseball and, while under oath, denied ever using steroids and stated, "Let me start by telling you this: I have never used steroids, period. I don't know how to say it any more clearly than that. Never."

On August 1, 2005, Palmeiro was suspended for ten days after testing positive for a steroid. The Washington Post reported that the steroid detected in Palmeiro's system was a "serious" one. According to The New York Times, Palmeiro tested positive for the potent anabolic steroid stanozolol. In a public statement, Palmeiro disclosed that an appeal of the suspension had already been denied. He released a statement saying, "I have never intentionally used steroids. Never. Ever. Period. Ultimately, although I never intentionally put a banned substance into my body, the independent arbitrator ruled that I had to be suspended under the terms of the program." According to Palmeiro, all of his previous tests over the two years including the 2003 sealed test were negative, and a test he took just three weeks after his positive test was also negative. The House Government Reform Committee would not seek perjury charges against Palmeiro, although they were not clearing him.

Palmeiro returned to Camden Yards following his 10-day suspension on August 11, 2005, although he did not play in the lineup until August 14. Coincidentally, this was the date that had been planned as "Rafael Palmeiro Appreciation Day" in celebration of his 500-home run, 3,000-hit milestone. It was canceled after Palmeiro's suspension. The Baltimore Sun reported that Palmeiro never offered an explanation for his positive test to the MLB arbitration panel, which ran contrary to his public statements. ESPN later reported that Palmeiro implicated Miguel Tejada to baseball's arbitration panel, suggesting a supplement provided to him by Tejada was responsible for his positive test. This supplement was supposedly vitamin B_{12}, though it could have been tainted. Tejada and two unnamed teammates provided B_{12} samples to the panel, which did not contain stanozolol. However, the committee did say they found "substantial inconsistencies between Mr. Tejada's accounts and the accounts of players A and B." Tejada, who said he received shipments of B_{12} from the Dominican Republic, was later implicated for steroid use in the Mitchell Report.

Palmeiro continues to strongly deny ever having used steroids intentionally, telling The Baltimore Sun in June 2006, "Yes sir, that's what happened. It's not a story; it's the reality of what happened", and "I said what I said before Congress because I meant every word of it." Palmeiro passed a polygraph test in which he was not asked if he ever used steroids, but in which he did state that he unknowingly ingested them via a B_{12} injection. A 2005 New York Times article expressed one writer's belief that Palmeiro's story could perhaps be the truth.

In December 2007, Palmeiro was included in the Mitchell Report in which it was alleged that he used performance-enhancing drugs during his career. The report did not provide any new evidence and only recapped allegations made by José Canseco, Palmeiro's appearance before Congress, and his subsequent failed drug test. The report also details a conversation Larry Bigbie alleges he had with Palmeiro where he claims "Palmeiro asked him about his source of steroids and human growth hormone (the source was Kirk Radomski) and how the substances made him feel." Bigbie also stated that "Palmeiro denied in those conversations that he had ever used performance-enhancing substances himself." On December 20, 2007, Palmeiro was named in Jason Grimsley's unsealed affidavit as a user of amphetamines prior to their being banned by MLB.

== Personal life ==
Palmeiro lives in Colleyville, Texas, with his wife. His son Patrick played college baseball at the University of Alabama-Birmingham and in the Chicago White Sox organization. His son Preston played college baseball for North Carolina State University and was drafted by the Baltimore Orioles in the seventh round of the 2016 MLB draft.

== See also ==
- List of Cubans
- List of Cuban Americans
- 500 home run club
- 3,000 hit club
- List of Major League Baseball home run records
- List of Major League Baseball doubles records
- List of Major League Baseball career home run leaders
- List of Major League Baseball career hits leaders
- List of Major League Baseball career doubles leaders
- List of Major League Baseball career runs scored leaders
- List of Major League Baseball career runs batted in leaders
- List of Major League Baseball annual runs scored leaders
- List of Major League Baseball annual doubles leaders
- List of Major League Baseball players suspended for performance-enhancing drugs
- List of Major League Baseball players named in the Mitchell Report
- List of doping cases in sport

Preceded by John Olerud; Bernie Williams; Nomar Garciaparra; Joe Randa	American League Player of the Month; July 1993; June 1998; June 1999; August 1999 (with Iván Rodríguez)	Succeeded by Frank Thomas; Albert Belle; Joe Randa; Albert Belle
