= Pat McMahon (baseball) =

American baseball coach (born 1953)

Biographical details
- Born: May 28, 1953 (age 73); Lackawanna, New York, U.S.

Playing career
- 1972–1974: St. Johns River State College
- 1974–1975: Stetson
- Position: Pitcher

Coaching career (HC unless noted)
- 1976: Stetson (student assistant)
- 1977–1980: Bishop Kenny High School
- 1980–1981: Mississippi State (graduate assistant)
- 1981–1982: Old Dominion (assistant coach)
- 1983–1989: Mississippi State (assistant coach)
- 1990–1994: Old Dominion
- 1995–1997: Mississippi State (associate HC)
- 1998–2001: Mississippi State
- 2002–2007: Florida
- 2008: Staten Island Yankees

Head coaching record
- Overall: 584–317–1 .648 (college)

Accomplishments and honors

Championships
- Colonial Athletic Association (1994); SEC tournament (2001); Southeastern Conference (2005); New York–Penn League (2008)

Awards
- Sun Belt Conference Coach of the Year (1990); Colonial Athletic Association Coach of the Year (1994); ABCA South Region of the Year (1998 & 2005); USA Baseball Coach of the Year (2001); SEC Coach of the Year (2005); College Baseball Foundation National Coach of the Year (2005); ABCA Lefty Gomez Award (2015)

Pat McMahon (born May 28, 1953) is an American former college and professional baseball coach who currently works in the New York Yankees' organization.

== Early life ==
McMahon grew up in Jacksonville, Florida and attended Bishop Kenny High School. During High School he earned nine varsity letters in, baseball, basketball, and football. As a senior, he was named earning all-state baseball. He was selected in the 18th round of the 1971 Major League Baseball draft by the New York Mets. Rather than sign with the Mets McMahon elected to play college baseball at Saint John's River Community College in Palatka, Florida, for two seasons. After finishing his JUCO career he played at Stetson University from 1974–1975. He graduated with a physical education degree and spent a year as a student assistant coach with the Hatters in 1976.

== Early coaching career ==
McMahon's first coaching job after leaving college was as the head coach at Bishop Kenney High School from 1977–1980. From there he went on to server stints as an assistant coach at Mississippi State from 1980–1981, Old Dominion University from 1981–1982, and MSU again from 1983–1989.

== Old Dominion ==
He was the head coach at Old Dominion from 1990–94. During his time at ODU he led The Monarchs to an overall record of 189–86 along with 2 NCAA Regional appearances and a 1994 Colonial Athletic Association championship. McMahon left ODU in 1994 to become Associate Head Coach at Mississippi State

== Mississippi State University ==
McMahon returned to Mississippi State in 1994 to serve as Associate Head Coach under legendary MSU Head Coach Ron Polk with the understanding that he would become the head coach when Polk retired. Polk had essentially picked McMahon as his successor.

" That's why we hired Pat McMahon this summer as associate coach. I felt if he did take a baseball job at a very fine university, it would be tougher getting him to return here when I retired. And, since this is where Pat McMahon wants to be, he is coming back now with the understanding that he will become the head coach when I retire. I'm thankful (MSU President) Dr. Zacharias and (athletic director) Larry Templeton have allowed me to put this plan in place. There are not many places in the country where the present coach is allowed to pick or help name his successor." -Ron Polk

Following the MSU's appearance in the 1997 College World Series, Ron Polk retired and McMahon took over as head coach. The McMahon era got off to a fast start at MSU as he led the Diamond Dogs back to the College World Series, marking the first time that MSU had made back to back appearances in Omaha. McMahon's spent a total of four years as head coach at MSU where his teams compiled an overall record of 164–88 and surpassed the 40 win mark 3 times. In 2001, he led MSU to the SEC Tournament championship. In total under McMahon MSU appeared in 4 NCAA Regionals, and 2 NCAA Super Regionals to go along with their 1998 College World Series appearance. McMahon left MSU following the 2001 season to become the Head coach at the University of Florida. He was replaced at MSU by the very man that he had replaced four years earlier, Ron Polk.

== University of Florida ==
Following his time at MSU, McMahon returned to his home state of Florida in 2001 to take over as the skipper of the Gator baseball program following the dismissal of Andy Lopez McMahon spent a total of six season as the Gators' Head Coach (2002–2007). Under his leadership UF compiled a record of 202–113 while making 4 NCAA Regional appearances, 2 Super Regional appearances, and 1 College World Series appearance to go along with winning the 2005 SEC Championship. On June 7, 2007, the University of Florida announced that McMahon had been fired following back to back seasons where the Gators finished 28–28 and 29–30 respectively.

== USA Baseball ==
Coach McMahon has also spent time as a member of the coaching staff for USA Baseball including serving as Assistant Coach in 1991, Pitching Coach in 1997, and Head Coach in 2001.

== Professional coaching career ==
On September 29, 2007, Baby-Bombers.com reported that McMahon had accepted a position with the New York Yankees. in 2008 he was named the Manager of the Staten Island Yankees,(the New York Yankees' Short-Season A affiliate) who play in the New York–Penn League. He spent one season as the manager of the Staten Island club leading them to a 49–26 record and a first-place finish. He also managed the New York-Penn American League All-Star team.

During his stint as manager of the Staten Island Yankees McMahon was involved in the game that led to the creation of the Venditte Rule. Pat Venditte, at that time a member of the Staten Island ball club, is best known for being an ambidextrous pitcher or a "switch-pitcher". On June 19, 2008, in a game against the Brooklyn Cyclones, Venditte pitched a scoreless ninth inning for a Yankees win. Before Venditte faced the last Cyclone batter, Ralph Henriquez, a switch-hitter, upon choosing to bat left- or right-handed (with Venditte subsequently choosing to pitch with the same hand), Henriquez would then go to the other side of the plate (and adjust his shin guard—which is worn on the front leg when a batter takes his stance) to regain the advantage. After this had happened several times the teams appealed to the umpiring crew, which ruled that the batter must first select from which side of the plate he intended to hit, and that the pitcher would then be allowed to declare with which arm he would pitch (the Venditte Rule, adopted several weeks later by the umpires' association, would make the opposite determination and preserve the traditional right of a switch-hitter to choose an opposite-handed match-up). Venditte subsequently struck out Henriquez to end the game. A film of the incident received notoriety on the Internet and the tale was recounted in a number of places, including within the baseball compendium Rollie's Follies.

== Post coaching career ==
McMahon currently works as the New York Yankees' International Player Development Coordinator and was named the 2016 named Lefty Gomez Award winner by the American Baseball Coaches Association. On July 18, 2017 The American Baseball Coaches Association announced that he had been selected for induction into the ABCA Hall of Fame during their convention on January 5, 2018 in Indianapolis, Indiana.

== Head coaching record ==
Record table
Season	Team	Overall	Conference	Standing	Postseason
Old Dominion (Colonial Athletic Association) (1990–1994)
1990	Old Dominion	40–19	11–6		NCAA Regional
1991	Old Dominion	39–23	10–8		
1992	Old Dominion	39–19	11–7		
1993	Old Dominion	31–11	9–3		
1994	Old Dominion	40–14	14–4	1st	NCAA Regional
Old Dominion:		189–86	55–28		
Mississippi State (Southeastern Conference) (1998–2001)
1998	Mississippi State	42–23	14–15	6th	College World Series
1999	Mississippi State	42–21	15–14	6th	NCAA Regional
2000	Mississippi State	41–20	17–10	3rd	NCAA Super Regional
2001	Mississippi State	39–24	17–13	4th	NCAA Super Regional
Mississippi State:		164–88	63–52		
Florida (Southeastern Conference) (2002–2007)
2002	Florida	46–19	20–10	3rd	NCAA Regional
2003	Florida	37–21–1	13–16–1	9th	NCAA Regional
2004	Florida	43–22	17–13	6th	NCAA Regional
2005	Florida	48–23	20–10	1st	College World Series Runner–Up
2006	Florida	28–28	10–20	11th	
2007	Florida	29–30	15–15	6th	
Florida:		231–143–1	95–84–1		
Total:		584–317–1			
National champion Postseason invitational champion Conference regular season champion Conference regular season and conference tournament champion Division regular season champion Division regular season and conference tournament champion Conference tournament champion

== Managerial record ==
Team	Year	Regular season					Postseason			
Team	Year	Games	Won	Lost	Win %	Finish	Won	Lost	Win %	Result
SIY	2008	75	49	26	.653	1st – New York–Penn League McNamara	0	2	.000	Lost in semi-finals
Total		75	49	26	.653		0	2	.000	

== Awards and honors ==
In his twelve seasons as a college head coach, McMahon compiled a career record of 527–259–1, appeared in two College World Series, made four Super Regional appearances, put together eight 40-win seasons, and 13 30-win seasons. He received seven Coach of the Year awards.

- 1990 Sun Belt Conference Coach of the Year
- 1994 Colonial Athletic Association Coach of the Year
- 1998 & 2005 ABCA South Region Coach of the Year
- 1998 Became just the second coach in SEC history to guide a team to the College World Series in his first season in the league
- 2001 Recipient of the 25-year ABCA membership award
- 2001 USA Baseball Coach of the Year
- 2001–06 ABCA All-America Committee South Region Chair
- 2004 ABCA Division I Coaches Chairman
- 2005 SEC Coach of the Year
- 2005 College Baseball Foundation National Coach of the Year
- 2006 ABCA Division I All-America Chairman
- 2006 ABCA Division I All-America Chairman
- 2006 ABCA Third Vice President
- 2015 ABCA Lefty Gomez Award
- 2015 Inducted into the Old Dominion University Sports Hall Of Fame
- 2016 Lefty Gomez Award winner
- 2018 ABCA Hall of Fame

== Personal ==
He is married to the former Cheri Wells of Jacksonville and the couple are the parents of two children; a daughter, Logan, and a son, J. Wells. McMahon is the oldest of Jack and Pat McMahon's eight children.
