= Ed Easley =

American baseball player (born 1985)

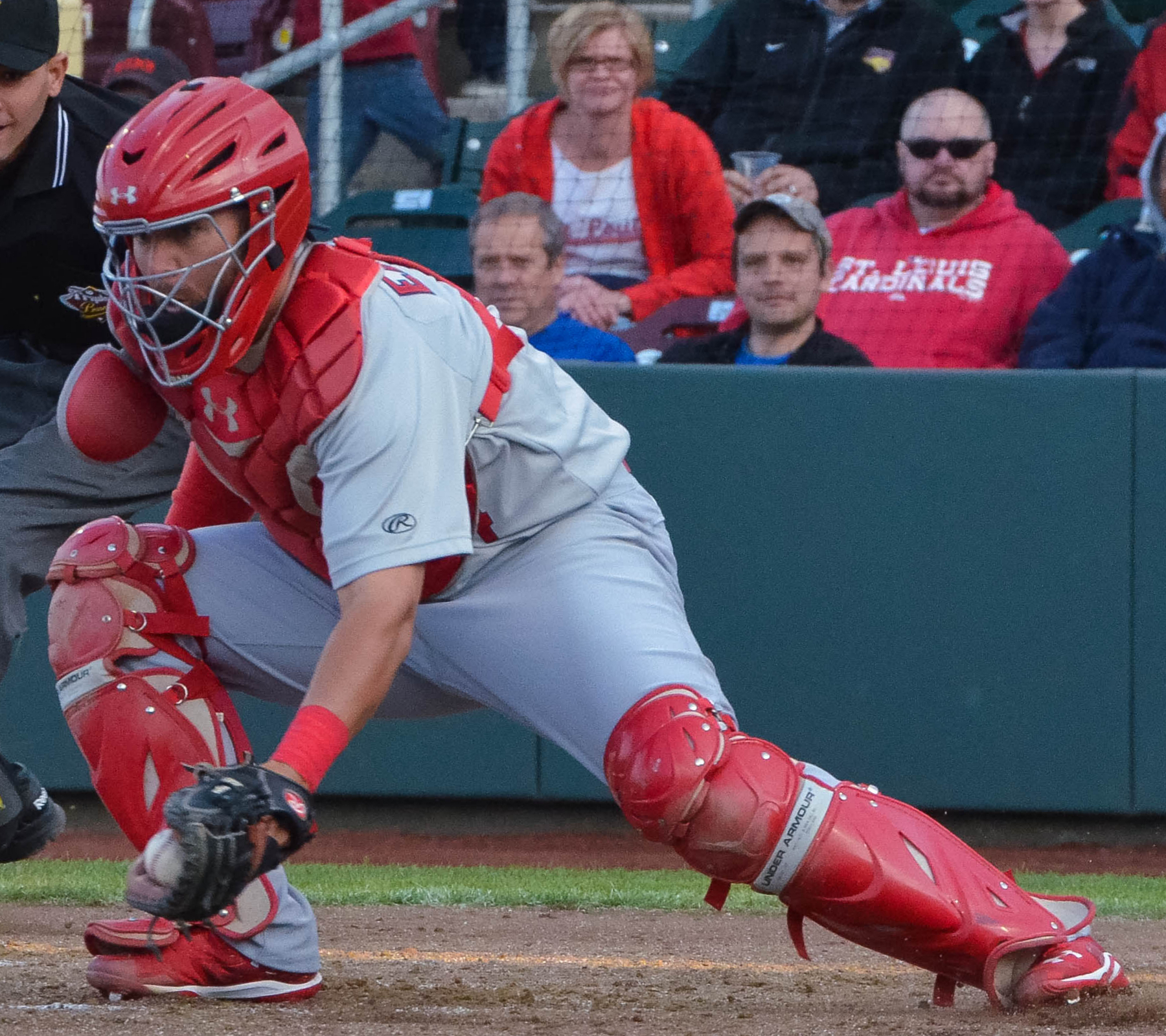
- Easley playing for the Memphis Redbirds in 2015
- Catcher
- Born: December 21, 1985 (age 40); Memphis, Tennessee, U.S.
- Batted: Right Threw: Right

MLB debut
- May 29, 2015, for the St. Louis Cardinals

Last appearance
- October 4, 2015, for the St. Louis Cardinals

MLB statistics
- Batting average: .000
- Home runs: 0
- Runs batted in: 1
- Stats at Baseball Reference

Teams
- St. Louis Cardinals (2015)

Edward Michael Easley (born December 21, 1985) is an American former professional baseball catcher. He played in Major League Baseball (MLB) for the St. Louis Cardinals in 2015.

== High school and college ==
Easley attended Olive Branch High School, where he was an All-American and a 2-time All-State catcher for the Conquistadors. He had a .469 batting average with 12 home runs and 55 runs batted in (RBIs) in 2004, his senior year, earning him the Mississippi Gatorade Player of the Year award.

Easley played college baseball at Mississippi State University for the Mississippi State Bulldogs baseball team. In his freshman year of 2005, he split time at third base and catcher in 62 games, hitting .296 with three home runs and 32 RBIs. After the 2005 season, he played collegiate summer baseball with the Wareham Gatemen of the Cape Cod Baseball League (CCBL). In his sophomore year of 2006, he hit .336 with four home runs, 42 RBIs, and 18 doubles. After the 2006 season, he returned to the CCBL to play for the Chatham A's. In his junior year, he hit .358 with 12 home runs and 68 RBIs. He won the Johnny Bench Award, beating out Buster Posey and Matt Wieters. Easley was also the 2007 recipient of the Cellular South Ferriss Trophy (now the C Spire Ferriss Trophy), awarded annually to Mississippi's top collegiate baseball player.

== Professional career ==
=== Arizona Diamondbacks ===
Easley was drafted by the Arizona Diamondbacks in the supplemental first round (61st overall) of the 2007 Major League Baseball draft, and received a $531,000 signing bonus. Easley was assigned to the Yakima Bears of the Low-A Northwest League, where in 33 games at catcher and first base, he hit .250 with six home runs and 20 RBI. Easley played 2008 with the Visalia Oaks of the High-A California League, where in 118 games between catcher, first base and third base with the Oaks, he hit .247 with six home runs, 53 RBI, and 20 doubles. Easley was Visalia's Opening Day third baseman in 2009, as Konrad Schmidt was their starting catcher. In 106 games with Visalia (now named the Rawhide), he hit .228 with three home runs, 38 RBI and 18 doubles. Easley began 2010 with the Mobile BayBears of the Double-A Southern League, where he hit .259 in 55 games as the backup to Schmidt. On August 4, Easley earned a promotion to the Reno Aces of the Triple-A Pacific Coast League (PCL) to end the year. In 17 games with the Aces, he hit .188 with seven RBI. After the season, Easley played with the Scottsdale Scorpions of the Arizona Fall League, where he hit 5-for-21 (.238) in seven games.

Easley was the BayBears' primary catcher in 2011, where in 83 games, he hit .273 with four home runs, 37 RBI and 16 doubles. He was Mobile's Opening Day catcher in 2012, but played in fewer games than their other catcher, Rossmel Perez. In 67 games with the BayBears in 2012, he hit .265 with two home runs and 23 RBI. Easley played for Reno in 2013, where he was used, along with Tuffy Gosewisch, at catcher. He was named the Diamondbacks' Minor League Co-Player of the Month in August, when he hit .402 with two home runs, 15 RBI, and 14 runs. In 87 games with the Aces in 2013, Easley hit .334 with six home runs, 49 RBI, 39 runs, and 22 doubles. He threw out a career-high 35.7% of would-be base stealers. After the season, Easley became a free agent.

=== St. Louis Cardinals ===
Easley signed a minor league contract with the St. Louis Cardinals organization on November 18, 2013. The Cardinals assigned him to the Triple-A Memphis Redbirds of the PCL at the start of the 2014 season, where he batted .296/.359/.473 with 10 home runs and 43 RBI. On November 3, 2014, the Cardinals added Easley to their 40-man roster to prevent him from reaching minor league free agency.

On April 10, 2015, Easley was promoted to the major leagues for the first time; the move was made due to fellow catcher Tony Cruz being placed on the paternity list. Easley made his MLB debut on May 29 against the Los Angeles Dodgers, appearing as a pinch hitter and reaching base on an error. He had his first MLB start on October 4, catching an entire game against the Atlanta Braves. With the 2015 St. Louis Cardinals, Easley appeared in four games, and was hitless in six at bats. On November 2, Easley was removed from the 40-man roster and sent outright to the Triple–A Memphis Redbirds. In the 2015 offseason, he elected free agency.

=== Pittsburgh Pirates ===
On January 1, 2016, Easley signed a minor league contract with the Pittsburgh Pirates that included an invitation to spring training. He made 36 appearances for the Triple-A Indianapolis Indians, hitting .174/.260/.209 with one home run and 11 RBI. Easley was released by the Pirates organization on June 26.

== Personal life ==
During the offseason, Easley runs a baseball camp located at Olive Branch High School for 6–18 year olds.
