= 1990 LSU Tigers baseball team =

American college baseball season

1990 LSU Tigers baseball

NCAA South I Regional champions SEC Tournament co-champions SEC champions

College World Series, 2–2
- Conference: Southeastern Conference
- Record: 54–19 (20–7 SEC)
- Head coach: Skip Bertman (7th year)
- Home stadium: Alex Box Stadium

1990 Southeastern Conference baseball standings
| | Conf. | | | | Overall |
| Team | W | | L | PCT | W | | L | PCT |
|---|---|---|---|---|---|---|---|---|
| No. 4 LSU ‍†‍‡‍^{y} | 20 | – | 7 | .741 | 54 | – | 19 | .740 |
| No. 1 Georgia ‍‍‍^{y} | 18 | – | 9 | .667 | 52 | – | 19 | .732 |
| No. 5 Mississippi State ‍‍‡‍^{y} | 17 | – | 9 | .654 | 50 | – | 21 | .704 |
| Auburn ‍‍‍ | 13 | – | 13 | .500 | 34 | – | 24 | .586 |
| Vanderbilt ‍‍‍ | 12 | – | 13 | .480 | 28 | – | 30 | .483 |
| Florida ‍‍‍ | 11 | – | 12 | .478 | 29 | – | 30 | .492 |
| Alabama ‍‍‍ | 10 | – | 13 | .435 | 34 | – | 21 | .618 |
| Ole Miss ‍‍‍ | 10 | – | 16 | .385 | 23 | – | 29 | .442 |
| Tennessee ‍‍‍ | 9 | – | 18 | .333 | 28 | – | 31 | .475 |
| Kentucky ‍‍‍ | 8 | – | 18 | .308 | 27 | – | 29 | .482 |
† – Conference champion ‡ – Tournament champion y – Invited to the NCAA tournament As of June 30, 1990; Rankings from Collegiate Baseball

The 1990 LSU Tigers baseball team represented Louisiana State University in the 1990 NCAA Division I baseball season. The Tigers played their home games at Alex Box Stadium, and played as part of the Southeastern Conference. The team was coached by Skip Bertman in his seventh season as head coach at LSU.

The Tigers won the SEC, claimed a co-championship in the SEC Tournament after weather ended the championship game, then reached the College World Series, their fourth appearance in Omaha, where they finished 4th after a pair of wins against The Citadel and two losses to eventual runner-up Oklahoma State.

== Personnel ==
=== Roster ===
1990 LSU Tigers roster
| Pitchers: 9 - Paul Byrd - Sophomore; 10 - Mike Sirotka - Freshman; 14 - Jason Wall - Senior; 17 - Keith Millay - Freshman; 23 - Rick Greene - Freshman; 28 - Matt Chamberlain - Freshman; 30 - Chad Ogea - Sophomore; 32 - David Herry - Sophomore; 37 - Mark LaRosa - Junior; 39 - Scott Pace - Freshman; 40 - Rusty Jenkins - Junior; 41 - John O'Donoghue - Junior | Catchers: 8 - Gary Hymel - Junior; 24 - Larry Schneider - Freshman; 35 - Gregg Moock - Freshman; 42 - Kyle Mall - Senior; 51 - Drew Bowman - Junior; Outfielders: 4 - Ron Lim - Senior; 6 - Tim Clark - Senior; 18 - Jared Mula - Freshman; 21 - Lyle Mouton - Sophomore; 29 - Mike Graham - Freshman; 33 - John Badgley - Freshman; 36 - Wes Grisham - Senior | Infielders: 1 - Tookie Johnson - Junior; 3 - Keith Osik - Junior; 5 - Luis Garcia - Sophomore; 7 - Scott Bethea - Junior; 12 - Pat Garrity - Junior; 16 - Jessie Daigle - Freshman; 20 - Johnny Tellechea - Junior; 27 - Rich Cordani - Junior |

=== Coaches ===
1990 LSU Tigers baseball coaching staff
- Skip Bertman - Head coach - 7th Season
- Smoke Laval - Assistant coach - 5th Season
- Beetle Bailey - Assistant coach
- Randy Davis - Graduate Assistant Coach
- Jerry Hand - Graduate Assistant Coach

== Schedule and results ==
Legend
| LSU win |
| LSU loss |

1990 LSU Tigers baseball game log
Regular season

February
| Date | Opponent | Site/Stadium | Score | Overall Record | SEC Record |
|---|---|---|---|---|---|
| Feb 9 | vs Wichita State* | Baseball City Stadium • Davenport, FL (ABCA Hall of Fame Tournament) | L 6–13 | 0–1 | |
| Feb 11 | vs North Carolina* | Baseball City Stadium • Davenport, FL (ABCA Hall of Fame Tournament) | W 8–5 | 1–1 | |
| Feb 13 | vs Louisiana Tech* | Baseball City Stadium • Davenport, FL (ABCA Hall of Fame Tournament) | W 15–3 | 2–1 | |
| Feb 16 | vs Mississippi State* | Louisiana Superdome • New Orleans, LA (Busch Challenge III) | W 7–6 | 3–1 | |
| Feb 17 | vs Ole Miss* | Louisiana Superdome • New Orleans, LA (Busch Challenge IV) | W 7–5 | 4–1 | |
| Feb 18 | vs Southern Miss* | Louisiana Superdome • New Orleans, LA (Busch Challenge IV) | L 1–5 | 4–2 | |
| Feb 20 | Southern* | Alex Box Stadium • Baton Rouge, LA | W 17–5 | 5–2 | |
| Feb 24 | at Rice* | Cameron Field • Houston, TX | L 11–12 | 5–3 | |
| Feb 25 | at Rice* | Cameron Field • Houston, TX | W 13–1 | 6–3 | |
| Feb 28 | at Southern Miss* | Pete Taylor Park • Hattiesburg, MS | W 10–2 | 7–3 | |

March
| Date | Opponent | Site/Stadium | Score | Overall Record | SEC Record |
|---|---|---|---|---|---|
| Mar 2 | at Texas A&M* | Olsen Field • College Station, TX | L 2–4 | 7–4 | |
| Mar 3 | at Texas A&M* | Olsen Field • College Station, TX | L 2–5^{7} | 7–5 | |
| Mar 3 | at Texas A&M* | Olsen Field • College Station, TX | W 5–2 | 8–5 | |
| Mar 6 | Southern* | Alex Box Stadium • Baton Rouge, LA | W 14–1 | 9–5 | |
| Mar 7 | New Orleans* | Alex Box Stadium • Baton Rouge, LA | W 10–3 | 10–5 | |
| Mar 10 | Kansas* | Alex Box Stadium • Baton Rouge, LA | W 9–3^{7} | 11–5 | |
| Mar 10 | Kansas* | Alex Box Stadium • Baton Rouge, LA | W 10–1 | 12–5 | |
| Mar 11 | Kansas* | Alex Box Stadium • Baton Rouge, LA | W 8–2 | 13–5 | |
| Mar 13 | Saint Louis* | Alex Box Stadium • Baton Rouge, LA | W 20–2 | 14–5 | |
| Mar 14 | Evansville* | Alex Box Stadium • Baton Rouge, LA | W 28–8 | 15–5 | |
| Mar 17 | at Mississippi State | Dudy Noble Field • Starkville, MS | W 6–5 | 16–5 | 1–0 |
| Mar 17 | at Mississippi State | Dudy Noble Field • Starkville, MS | L 1–2^{7} | 16–6 | 1–1 |
| Mar 18 | at Mississippi State | Dudy Noble Field • Starkville, MS | L 9–10^{13} | 16–7 | 1–2 |
| Mar 20 | Nicholls State* | Alex Box Stadium • Baton Rouge, LA | W 4–3 | 17–7 | |
| Mar 21 | at McNeese State* | Joe Miller Ballpark • Lake Charles, LA | W 13–1 | 18–7 | |
| Mar 24 | Ole Miss | Alex Box Stadium • Baton Rouge, LA | W 10–2^{7} | 19–7 | 2–2 |
| Mar 24 | Ole Miss | Alex Box Stadium • Baton Rouge, LA | W 10–7 | 20–7 | 3–2 |
| Mar 25 | Ole Miss | Alex Box Stadium • Baton Rouge, LA | W 6–0 | 21–7 | 4–2 |
| Mar 27 | at Southeastern Louisiana* | Alumni Field • Hammond, LA | W 8–1 | 22–7 | |
| Mar 31 | Auburn | Alex Box Stadium • Baton Rouge, LA | W 12–6 | 23–7 | 5–2 |
| Mar 31 | Auburn | Alex Box Stadium • Baton Rouge, LA | L 5–6^{7} | 23–8 | 5–3 |

April
| Date | Opponent | Site/Stadium | Score | Overall Record | SEC Record |
|---|---|---|---|---|---|
| Apr 1 | Auburn | Alex Box Stadium • Baton Rouge, LA | L 7–17 | 23–9 | 5–4 |
| Apr 3 | Southeastern Louisiana* | Alex Box Stadium • Baton Rouge, LA | W 16–0 | 24–9 | |
| Apr 4 | at Nicholls State* | Ray E. Didier Field • Thibodaux, LA | W 8–6 | 25–9 | |
| Apr 7 | at Florida | Alfred A. McKethan Stadium • Gainesville, FL | W 6–3 | 26–9 | 6–4 |
| Apr 7 | at Florida | Alfred A. McKethan Stadium • Gainesville, FL | L 6–7^{7} | 26–10 | 6–5 |
| Apr 8 | at Florida | Alfred A. McKethan Stadium • Gainesville, FL | W 5–3 | 27–10 | 7–5 |
| Apr 11 | Stephen F. Austin* | Alex Box Stadium • Baton Rouge, LA | W 4–3 | 28–10 | |
| Apr 11 | Stephen F. Austin* | Alex Box Stadium • Baton Rouge, LA | W 7–2^{7} | 29–10 | |
| Apr 14 | Tennessee | Alex Box Stadium • Baton Rouge, LA | W 2–0^{7} | 30–10 | 8–5 |
| Apr 14 | Tennessee | Alex Box Stadium • Baton Rouge, LA | W 13–2 | 31–10 | 9–5 |
| Apr 15 | Tennessee | Alex Box Stadium • Baton Rouge, LA | W 9–3 | 32–10 | 10–5 |
| Apr 17 | McNeese State* | Alex Box Stadium • Baton Rouge, LA | L 1–4 | 32–11 | |
| Apr 18 | at Tulane* | Tulane Diamond • New Orleans, LA | L 7–14 | 32–12 | |
| Apr 19 | Northwestern State* | Alex Box Stadium • Baton Rouge, LA | W 16–6 | 33–12 | |
| Apr 21 | Kentucky | Alex Box Stadium • Baton Rouge, LA | W 9–0^{7} | 34–12 | 11–5 |
| Apr 21 | Kentucky | Alex Box Stadium • Baton Rouge, LA | W 8–1 | 35–12 | 12–5 |
| Apr 22 | Kentucky | Alex Box Stadium • Baton Rouge, LA | W 9–3 | 36–12 | 13–5 |
| Apr 24 | Northeast Louisiana* | Alex Box Stadium • Baton Rouge, LA | L 4–5^{11} | 36–13 | |
| Apr 25 | at New Orleans* | Privateer Park • New Orleans, LA | W 6–4 | 37–13 | |
| Apr 28 | at Alabama | Sewell–Thomas Stadium • Tuscaloosa, AL | W 7–4 | 38–13 | 14–5 |
| Apr 28 | at Alabama | Sewell–Thomas Stadium • Tuscaloosa, AL | L 5–12^{7} | 38–14 | 14–6 |
| Apr 29 | at Alabama | Sewell–Thomas Stadium • Tuscaloosa, AL | W 8–5 | 39–14 | 15–6 |

May
| Date | Opponent | Site/Stadium | Score | Overall Record | SEC Record |
|---|---|---|---|---|---|
| May 5 | at Vanderbilt | McGugin Field • Nashville, TN | L 3–4^{7} | 39–15 | 15–7 |
| May 5 | at Vanderbilt | McGugin Field • Nashville, TN | W 7–5 | 40–15 | 16–7 |
| May 6 | at Vanderbilt | McGugin Field • Nashville, TN | W 7–3 | 41–15 | 17–7 |
| May 12 | Georgia | Alex Box Stadium • Baton Rouge, LA | W 11–2 | 42–15 | 18–7 |
| May 12 | Georgia | Alex Box Stadium • Baton Rouge, LA | W 5–2^{7} | 43–15 | 19–7 |
| May 13 | Georgia | Alex Box Stadium • Baton Rouge, LA | W 8–5 | 44–15 | 20–7 |

Postseason

SEC Tournament
| Date | Opponent | Seed | Site/Stadium | Score | Overall Record | SECT Record |
|---|---|---|---|---|---|---|
| May 17 | (6) Florida | (1) | Hoover Metropolitan Stadium • Hoover, AL | W 6–4 | 45–15 | 1–0 |
| May 18 | (3) Mississippi State | (1) | Hoover Metropolitan Stadium • Hoover, AL | W 17–8 | 46–15 | 2–0 |
| May 19 | (5) Vanderbilt | (1) | Hoover Metropolitan Stadium • Hoover, AL | W 13–5 | 47–15 | 3–0 |
| May 20 | (3) Mississippi State | (1) | Hoover Metropolitan Stadium • Hoover, AL | L 1–3 | 47–16 | 3–1 |
| May 20 | (3) Mississippi State | (1) | Hoover Metropolitan Stadium • Hoover, AL | Canceled due to weather | | |

NCAA South I Regional
| Date | Opponent | Seed | Site/Stadium | Score | Overall Record | Reg Record |
|---|---|---|---|---|---|---|
| May 24 | (6) Southwestern Louisiana | (1) | Alex Box Stadium • Baton Rouge, LA | W 8–0 | 48–16 | 1–0 |
| May 25 | (4) Georgia Tech | (1) | Alex Box Stadium • Baton Rouge, LA | W 11–5 | 49–16 | 2–0 |
| May 26 | (2) USC | (1) | Alex Box Stadium • Baton Rouge, LA | L 4–5 | 49–17 | 2–1 |
| May 26 | (3) Houston | (1) | Alex Box Stadium • Baton Rouge, LA | W 6–4 | 50–17 | 3–1 |
| May 27 | (2) USC | (1) | Alex Box Stadium • Baton Rouge, LA | W 5–4 | 51–17 | 4–1 |
| May 28 | (2) USC | (1) | Alex Box Stadium • Baton Rouge, LA | W 7–6 | 52–17 | 5–1 |

College World Series
| Date | Opponent | Seed | Site/Stadium | Score | Overall Record | CWS Record |
|---|---|---|---|---|---|---|
| June 2 | (7) The Citadel | (2) | Johnny Rosenblatt Stadium • Omaha, NE | W 8–2 | 53–17 | 1–0 |
| June 4 | (3) Oklahoma State | (2) | Johnny Rosenblatt Stadium • Omaha, NE | L 1–7 | 53–18 | 1–1 |
| June 5 | (7) The Citadel | (2) | Johnny Rosenblatt Stadium • Omaha, NE | W 6–1 | 54–18 | 2–1 |
| June 7 | (3) Oklahoma State | (2) | Johnny Rosenblatt Stadium • Omaha, NE | L 3–14 | 54–19 | 2–2 |
