= 2005 Mississippi State Bulldogs baseball team =

Mississippi State University in the 2005 NCAA Division I baseball season

2005 Mississippi State Bulldogs baseball

SEC Baseball Tournament champion
- Conference: Southeastern Conference
- Western Division
- Record: 42–22 (13-16 SEC)
- Head coach: Ron Polk (26th season)
- Home stadium: Dudy Noble Field, Polk–DeMent Stadium

2005 Southeastern Conference baseball standings
	Conf.				Overall
Team	W		L	PCT	W		L	PCT
Eastern
No. 2 Florida ^{x}‍†‍‍^{y}	20	–	10	.667	48	–	23	.676
No. 8 Tennessee ‍‍‍^{y}	18	–	11	.621	46	–	21	.687
No. 26 South Carolina ‍‍‍^{y}	16	–	14	.533	41	–	23	.641
Vanderbilt ‍‍‍	13	–	17	.433	34	–	21	.618
Georgia ‍‍‍	12	–	17	.414	30	–	25	.545
Kentucky ‍‍‍	7	–	22	.241	29	–	27	.518
Western
No. 11 Ole Miss ^{x}‍‍‍^{y}	18	–	12	.600	40	–	22	.645
No. 19 LSU ^{x}‍‍‍^{y}	18	–	12	.600	40	–	22	.645
No. 20 Alabama ‍‍‍^{y}	17	–	13	.567	40	–	23	.635
Mississippi State ‍‍‡‍^{y}	13	–	16	.448	42	–	22	.656
Arkansas ‍‍‍^{y}	13	–	17	.433	39	–	22	.639
Auburn ‍‍‍^{y}	13	–	17	.433	34	–	26	.567
x – Division champion † – Conference champion ‡ – Tournament champion y – Invited to the NCAA tournament As of June 30, 2005; Rankings from Collegiate Baseball

The 2005 Mississippi State Bulldogs baseball team won the SEC tournament and placed second at the Miami Regional at the 2005 NCAA Division I baseball tournament.

Ron Polk was the coach of the Bulldogs, in his 26th year.

== Regular season ==
The Bulldogs closed out the regular season with a 36–20 record and an SEC record of 13-16.

== SEC tournament ==
The Bulldogs defeated LSU, South Carolina, Tennessee, and Ole Miss en route to their 5th SEC Tournament victory.

== NCAA tournament ==
The Bulldogs were the 2 seed in the Miami regional, but lost twice to Miami and were eliminated.

== Season results ==
Date	Opponent	Result	Overall	SEC	Notes
Regular season
Feb 25	Eastern Illinois	W 3-1	1-0		
Feb 26	Eastern Illinois	W 16-6	2-0		
March 1	Miss. Valley State	W 14-7	3-0		
March 4	Austin Peay	W 4-3	4-0		NBC Classic - Starkville, MS
March 5	Kansas	W 5-0	5-0		NBC Classic - Starkville, MS
March 6	Kansas	W 9-2	6-0		NBC Classic - Starkville, MS
March 8	Louisiana Tech	W 5-3	7-0		
March 9	Jackson State	W 14-2	8-0		
March 11	at Arizona	L 3-9	8-1		
March 12	at Arizona	L 3-7	8-2		
March 13	at Arizona	W 13-12	9-2		
March 15	Memphis	W 11-8	10-2		
March 16	Memphis	W 4-2	11-2		
March 18	Vanderbilt	L 3-10	11-3	0-1	
March 19	Vanderbilt	W 5-3	12-3	1-1	
March 20	Vanderbilt	W 5-1	13-3	2-1	
March 22	New Orleans	W 5-1	14-3		
March 23	New Orleans	W 8-4	15-3		
March 25	at Arkansas	W 5-3	16-3	3-1	
March 26	at Arkansas	W 13-4	17-3	4-1	
March 27	at Arkansas	L 5-10	17-4	4-2	
March 29	Ole Miss	L 1-5	17-5		Mayor's Trophy - Jackson, MS
April 3	at Tennessee	L 1-2	17-6	4-3	
April 3	at Tennessee	L 1-2	17-7	4-4	
April 5	Samford	W 14-5	18-7		played in Jackson, MS
April 8	Auburn	W 4-1	19-7	5-4	
April 9	Auburn	L 7-8	19-8	5-5	
April 10	Auburn	W 4-0	20-8	6-5	
April 12	Louisiana-Monroe	W 9-3	21-8		
April 13	Samford	W 13-1	22-8		
April 15	at Georgia	L 1-5	22-9	6-6	
April 16	at Georgia	W 6-0	23-9	7-6	
April 17	at Georgia	L 3-6	23-10	7-7	
April 19	at South Alabama	W 10-6	24-10		
April 20	South Alabama	W 2-1	25-10		played in Jackson, MS
April 22	Kentucky	W 12-4	26-10	8-7	
April 23	Kentucky	L 5-12	26-11	8-8	
April 24	Kentucky	W 3-2	27-11	9-8	
April 26	Southern Miss	W 5-4	28-11		
April 27	Southern Miss	L 1-6	28-12		
April 29	at Ole Miss	L 4-11	28-13	9-9	
April 30	at Ole Miss	L 0-5	28-14	9-10	
May 1	at Ole Miss	L 1-9	28-15	9-11	
May 6	Alabama	W 7-3	29-15	10-11	
May 7	Alabama	L 3-5	29-16	10-12	
May 8	Alabama	W 5-3	30-16	11-12	
May 9	Birmingham Southern	W 10-4	31-16		played in Jackson, MS
May 10	Miss. Valley State	W 3-2	32-16		
May 13	at Florida	L 2-8	32-17	11-13	
May 14	at Florida	L 1-2	32-18	11-14	
May 15	at Florida	W 6-5	33-18	12-14	
May 17	UT-Martin	W 17-3	34-18		
May 17	UT-Martin	W 8-3	35-18		
May 20	LSU	L 5-7	35-19	12-15	
May 21	LSU	W 5-3	36-19	13-15	
May 22	LSU	L 2-3	36-20	13-16	
SEC tournament - Hoover, AL
May 25	LSU	W 9-2	37-20		
May 26	South Carolina	W 6-2	38-20		
May 28	Tennessee	W 3-2	39-20		
May 29	Ole Miss	W 4-1	40-20		SEC Tournament champion
NCAA Regionals - Coral Gables, FL
June 3	Florida Atlantic	W 13-2	41-20		
June 4	Miami	L 1-4	41-21		
June 5	Florida Atlantic	W 8-4	42-21		
June 5	Miami	L 4-10	42-22		2nd place in Regional

== See also ==
- Mississippi State Bulldogs
- Mississippi State Bulldogs baseball
