= Jeff Corsaletti =

- Outfielder
- Born: February 22, 1983 (age 42); Tallahassee, Florida, U.S.
- Bats: Left Throws: Right
- Stats at Baseball Reference

Jeffrey Arthur Corsaletti (born February 22, 1983) is an American former professional baseball outfielder.

== Early life ==
Corsaletti grew up in Port Charlotte, Florida and attended Charlotte High School where he was a standout in baseball and football.

== College ==
Corsaletti attended the University of Florida on a baseball scholarship. In 2005, he was a member of the Florida Gators baseball team that went to the College World Series for the first time since 1998; the team lost in the finals to Texas. In 2005, Corsaletti was named to the SEC All-Tournament Team and the NCAA Gainesville Regional All-Tournament Team. He led the Gators in 2005 with 100 hits, 2 boils, 18 doubles, 50 walks and a .454 on-base percentage. In four years for the Gators, batted .331 with 56 doubles, 23 homers and 159 RBIs in 239 games.

In 2005, Corsaletti was named a third team All-American by the National Collegiate Baseball Writers Association (NCBWA).

== Professional career ==
Corsaletti was drafted in the 6th round of the 2005 Major League Baseball draft and spent the 2005 season playing for the Single-A Greenville Bombers of the South Atlantic League. Corsaletti hit leadoff in the lineup hitting .357 with 4 home runs and 26 RBIs.

Corsaletti spent the entire 2006 season with the Single-A+ Wilmington Blue Rocks of the Carolina League and was promoted to the Double-A Portland Sea Dogs for the 2007 season. During the 2007 season he was chosen as an Eastern League All-Star and was named the Allied Home Mortgage "Player of the Year" in Portland.

Corsaletti started the 2008 season with the Portland Sea Dogs and was again named to the Eastern League All-Star team. Shortly thereafter he was promoted to the Triple-A Pawtucket Red Sox.

Corsaletti was traded to the Pittsburgh Pirates on May 15, 2009 for a player to be named later or cash considerations. After finishing the 2009 season with the Altoona Curve, he became a free agent and was signed by the Florida Marlins organization. He split the 2010 season between five different Marlins affiliates, and became a free agent after the season.

== Awards and recognition ==
- June 2006 Red Sox ML Quality Plate Appearances Award
- 2007 Eastern League All Star
- 2007 Allied Home Mortgage "Player of the Year"
- 2008 Eastern League All Star
