= Ron Polk =

American baseball coach (born 1944)

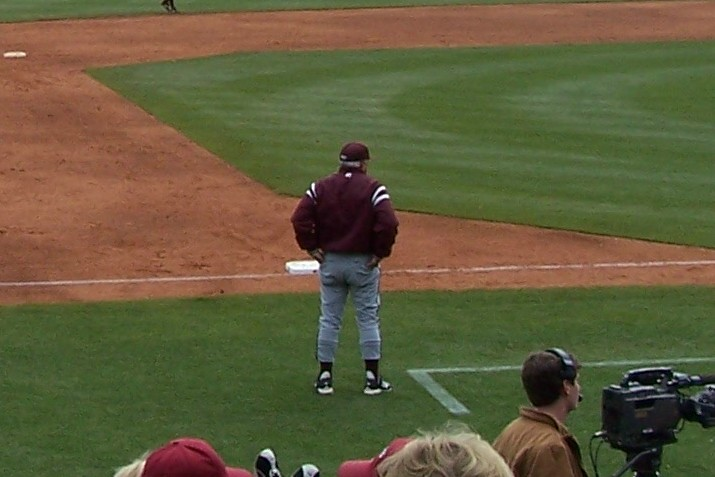
- Polk coaching at Baum Stadium in 2007

Current position
- Title: Special Asst. to the AD
- Team: Mississippi State
- Conference: Southeastern Conference

Biographical details
- Born: January 12, 1944 (age 82); Boston, Massachusetts, U.S.

Coaching career (HC unless noted)
- 1966: Arizona (GA)
- 1967: New Mexico (assistant)
- 1968–1971: Miami Dade College (assistant)
- 1972–1975: Georgia Southern
- 1976–1997: Mississippi State
- 2000–2001: Georgia
- 2002–2008: Mississippi State
- 2009–2020: UAB (volunteer asst.)
- 2022–present: Danville Dans (assistant)

Administrative career (AD unless noted)
- 2020–present: Mississippi State (special asst. to the AD)

Head coaching record
- Overall: 1,373–702–2 (.662)

Accomplishments and honors

Championships
- 5 SEC regular season (1979, 1985, 1987, 1989, 2001); 5 SEC Tournament (1979, 1985, 1987, 1990, 2005)

Awards
- 2x National Coach of the Year (1973, 1985); 4x SEC Coach of the Year (1979, 1985, 1989, 2001)
- College Baseball Hall of Fame; Inducted in 2009

Ronald George Polk (born January 12, 1944) is an American professional coach in NCAA Division I college baseball. He was a long-time head baseball coach at Mississippi State and is considered to be the "Father of Southeastern Conference Baseball." Polk compiled one of the most successful winning records, as a coach, in both MSU and Southeastern Conference history. In 31 seasons as an SEC coach he compiled a 1,218–638–2 (.656) record. His career record stands at 1,373–702–2. He currently ranks 9th on the all-time wins list nationally for 10+ year Division I coaches. His teams won five SEC championships and five SEC tournament championships. His teams participated in the NCAA tournament twenty-three times, and reached the College World Series seven times.

There were 185 players who played under him as a Head Coach, who signed professional baseball contracts, and 23 of these players played in the major leagues. He coached 35 All-Americans and 76 All-Southeastern Conference players. During his tenure at Mississippi State, Polk had eight players drafted in the first round of the professional baseball draft. He is one of only three coaches in college baseball history to coach at three different schools that have played in the College World Series in Omaha, Nebraska. Georgia Southern University – 1973; Mississippi State University – 1979, 1981, 1985, 1990, 1997, 2007; University of Georgia – 2001. He coached teams that played in Omaha over a period of five decades (nine appearances) including as an assistant coach at the University of Arizona in 1966.

Polk is a member of the following Six Halls of Fame; Georgia Southern University Hall of fame (1990). American Baseball Coaches Association Hall of Fame (1995). State of Mississippi Athletic Hall of Fame (1998). Mississippi State University Athletic Hall of Fame (1998). National College Baseball Hall of Fame (2009). Phoenix, Arizona High School District Hall of Fame (2017). He is a Former President of the American Baseball Coaches Association (1985). Winner of the Lefty Gomez Award which is the highest award given by the American Baseball Coaches Association (1988). Received the highest award given out by the state of Mississippi Athletic Hall of Fame- The "Rube" Award (2017). Mississippi State University named the baseball stadium The Polk-Dement Stadium (1997).

Coach Polk has also completed seven tours on the U.S.A. National baseball team coaching staff serving as the head coach two times and as an assistant five times. He has coached in the Olympic Games two times once Seoul, South Korea in 1988 when the team won the gold medal and the other in Atlanta, Georgia in 1996 when the team won the Bronze medal. Polk authored The Baseball Playbook, the leading textbook for baseball in college, and coauthored The Baseball-Softball Playbook with Donna Lopiano.

From 1972 to 1975, he served as the head coach at Georgia Southern. From 2000 to 2001, he coached at Georgia. He has also served as an assistant coach at Arizona, and New Mexico.

In July 2008, Polk was announced as a volunteer assistant coach for the University of Alabama at Birmingham Blazers baseball squad. The Blazers are coached by Polk's former MSU assistant Brian Shoop.

Polk in 2009 and his former Mississippi State players, Rafael Palmeiro in 2009 and Will Clark in 2006, were inducted into the College Baseball Hall of Fame. In 2018 he was named as a Legend in the Southeastern Conference.

In 2016, Coach Polk coached in the Cape Cod Baseball League as an assistant coach with the Hyannis Harbor Hawks baseball team.

In May 2020, Mississippi State University announced that Ron Polk would be returning to the university as the Special Assistant to the Athletic Director.

== Head coaching record ==
Record table
Season	Team	Overall	Conference	Standing	Postseason
Georgia Southern Eagles () (1972–1975)
1972	Georgia Southern	31–19			
1973	Georgia Southern	43–12			College World Series
1974	Georgia Southern	47–14			NCAA Regional
1975	Georgia Southern	34–19			
Georgia Southern:		155–64 (.708)			
Mississippi State Bulldogs (Southeastern Conference) (1976–1997)
1976	Mississippi State	28–17	11–12		
1977	Mississippi State	33–15	11–9		
1978	Mississippi State	38–18	13–8		NCAA Regional
1979	Mississippi State	48–12	17–2	1st	College World Series
1980	Mississippi State	31–19	10–11		
1981	Mississippi State	46–17	17–6		College World Series
1982	Mississippi State	28–23	11–13		
1983	Mississippi State	42–15	17–5		NCAA Regional
1984	Mississippi State	45–16	18–5		NCAA Regional
1985	Mississippi State	50–15	16–8	1st	College World Series
1986	Mississippi State	34–21	12–15		
1987	Mississippi State	39–22	13–13	1st	NCAA Regional
1988	Mississippi State	44–20	17–10		NCAA Regional
1989	Mississippi State	54–14	20–5	1st	NCAA Regional
1990	Mississippi State	50–21	17–9		College World Series
1991	Mississippi State	42–21	12–9		NCAA Regional
1992	Mississippi State	40–22	15–9		NCAA Regional
1993	Mississippi State	41–21	17–12		NCAA Regional
1994	Mississippi State	36–23	15–12		
1995	Mississippi State	34–25	11–16		
1996	Mississippi State	38–24	17–13		NCAA Regional
1997	Mississippi State	47–21	19–11		College World Series
Georgia Bulldogs (Southeastern Conference) (2000–2001)
2000	Georgia	32–26	14–15		
2001	Georgia	47–22	20–10	1st	College World Series
Georgia:		79–48 (.622)	34–25 (.576)		
Mississippi State Bulldogs (Southeastern Conference) (2002–2008)
2002	Mississippi State	34–24–1	14–15		
2003	Mississippi State	42–20–1	17–12		NCAA Regional
2004	Mississippi State	35–24	13–17		NCAA Regional
2005	Mississippi State	42–22	13–16		NCAA Regional
2006	Mississippi State	37–23	12–17		NCAA Regional
2007	Mississippi State	38–22	15–13		College World Series
2008	Mississippi State	23–33	9–21		
Mississippi State:		1139–590 (.659)	419–324 (.564)		
Total:		1373–702–2 (.662)			
National champion Postseason invitational champion Conference regular season champion Conference regular season and conference tournament champion Division regular season champion Division regular season and conference tournament champion Conference tournament champion

== See also ==
- List of college baseball career coaching wins leaders
