= 2009 Washington Huskies softball team =

American college softball season

2009 Washington Huskies softball

National Champion NCAA Atlanta Super Regional champion NCAA Amherst Regional champion
- Conference: Pacific-10 Conference
- Record: 51–12 (14–7 Pac-10)
- Head coach: Heather Tarr (5th season)
- Home stadium: Husky Softball Stadium

2009 Pacific-10 Conference softball standings
	Conf.				Overall
Team	W		L	PCT	W		L	PCT
UCLA ‍†‍‍^{y}	16	–	5	.762	42	–	11	.792
Washington ‍‍‍^{y}	14	–	7	.667	51	–	12	.810
Arizona ‍‍‍^{y}	13	–	7	.650	46	–	17	.730
Stanford ‍‍‍^{y}	13	–	8	.619	48	–	11	.814
California ‍‍‍^{y}	10	–	10	.500	38	–	20	.655
Arizona State ‍‍‍^{y}	10	–	11	.476	47	–	19	.712
Oregon State ‍‍‍	4	–	17	.190	25	–	30	.455
Oregon ‍‍‍	3	–	18	.143	16	–	34	.320
† – Conference champion y – Invited to the NCAA tournament As of June 30, 2009; Rankings from Coaches' Poll

The 2009 Washington Huskies softball team represented the University of Washington in the 2009 NCAA Division I softball season. The Huskies were coached by Heather Tarr, who led her fifth season. The Huskies finished with a record of 51–12. They played their home games at Husky Softball Stadium and competed in the Pacific-10 Conference, where they finished second with a 14–7 record.

The Huskies were invited to the 2009 NCAA Division I softball tournament, where they won the Amherst Regional, swept the Atlanta Super Regional, and then completed a run through the Women's College World Series to claim their first NCAA Women's College World Series Championship.

== Roster ==
2009 Washington Huskies roster
Pitchers: 15 – Danielle Lawrie - (redshirt) Junior; Catchers: 6 – Taylor Smith – freshman; 12 – Alicia Blake – senior; 44 – Felecia Harris – freshman	Infielders: 1 – Dani Stuart – senior; 3 – Niki Williams – freshman; 7 – Jenn Salling - (redshirt) Sophomore; 10 – Jessica Ventoza – senior; 11 – Ashley Charters - (redshirt) Senior; 18 – Morgan Stuart – sophomore; 22 – Ashlyn Watson – senior	Outfielders: 2 – Marnie Koziol – senior; 4 – Kimi Pohlman – freshman; 19 – Ashley Tuiasosopo – sophomore; 21 – Lauren Greer - (redshirt) Senior; 22 – Alyson McWherter – junior; Utility: 5 – Amanda Fleischman – junior; 14 – Jenna Clifton – freshman; 20 – Bailey Stenson – junior

== Schedule ==
Legend
	Washington win
	Washington loss
*	Non-Conference game

2009 Washington Huskies softball game log
Regular season

February
Date	Opponent	Site/stadium	Score	Overall record	Pac-10 record
Feb 6	vs No. 12 Tennessee*	St. George, UT	W 2–1	1–0	
Feb 6	vs BYU*	St. George, UT	W 7–3	2–0	
Feb 7	at Southern Utah*	St. George, UT	W 9–0^{5}	3–0	
Feb 7	vs Loyola Marymount*	St. George, UT	W 4–2	4–0	
Feb 8	vs Utah*	St. George, UT	W 4–0	5–0	
Feb 13	vs UC Santa Barbara*	SDSU Softball Stadium • San Diego, CA	W 3–0	6–0	
Feb 13	vs Utah State*	SDSU Softball Stadium • San Diego, CA	W 16–3^{5}	7–0	
Feb 14	at San Diego State*	SDSU Softball Stadium • San Diego, CA	W 5–0	8–0	
Feb 15	vs No. 25 Long Beach State*	SDSU Softball Stadium • San Diego, CA	W 14–1^{5}	9–0	
Feb 20	vs LIU Brooklyn*	Palm Springs, CA	W 7–3	10–0	
Feb 20	vs No. 2 Florida*	Palm Springs, CA	W 1–0^{9}	11–0	
Feb 21	vs Ole Miss*	Palm Springs, CA	W 8–2	12–0	
Feb 22	vs Nebraska*	Palm Springs, CA	W 6–0	13–0	
Feb 22	vs No. 23 Ohio State*	Palm Springs, CA	W 1–0^{8}	14–0	
Feb 27	Seattle*	Husky Softball Stadium • Seattle, WA	W 8–0^{6}	15–0	
Feb 28	Portland State*	Husky Softball Stadium • Seattle, WA	W 11–1^{5}	16–0	

March
Date	Opponent	Site/stadium	Score	Overall record	Pac-10 record
Mar 1	Portland State*	Husky Softball Stadium • Seattle, WA	W 8–2^{5}	17–0	
Mar 6	vs No. 24 Baylor*	Rhoads Stadium • Tuscaloosa, AL	W 1–0^{8}	18–0	
Mar 6	at No. 1 Alabama*	Rhoads Stadium • Tuscaloosa, AL	L 0–6	18–1	
Mar 7	vs No. 11 Georgia*	Rhoads Stadium • Tuscaloosa, AL	W 2–0	19–1	
Mar 7	at No. 1 Alabama*	Rhoads Stadium • Tuscaloosa, AL	W 6–0	20–1	
Mar 8	vs No. 11 Georgia*	Rhoads Stadium • Tuscaloosa, AL	L 0–2	20–2	
Mar 12	vs No. 24 Florida State*	Anderson Family Field • Fullerton, CA	W 4–1	21–2	
Mar 13	vs Penn State*	Anderson Family Field • Fullerton, CA	W 14–13	22–2	
Mar 13	vs No. 10 Michigan*	Anderson Family Field • Fullerton, CA	W 1–0	23–2	
Mar 14	vs No. 21 Fresno State*	Anderson Family Field • Fullerton, CA	W 3–0^{11}	24–2	
Mar 15	at Cal State Fullerton*	Anderson Family Field • Fullerton, CA	L 2–3	24–3	
Mar 21	New Mexico*	Husky Softball Stadium • Seattle, WA	W 14–3^{5}	25–3	
Mar 21	New Mexico*	Husky Softball Stadium • Seattle, WA	W 4–3^{8}	26–3	
Mar 22	New Mexico*	Husky Softball Stadium • Seattle, WA	W 9–2	27–3	
Mar 27	at California	Levine-Fricke Field • Berkeley, CA	W 9–1^{5}	28–3	1–0
Mar 28	at No. 1 Stanford	Boyd & Jill Smith Family Stadium • Stanford, CA	L 0–1^{11}	28–4	1–1
Mar 29	at No. 1 Stanford	Boyd & Jill Smith Family Stadium • Stanford, CA	L 0–2	28–5	1–2

April
Date	Opponent	Site/stadium	Score	Overall record	Pac-10 record
Apr 3	No. 1 Arizona	Husky Softball Stadium • Seattle, WA	W 6–0	29–5	2–2
Apr 4	No. 1 Arizona State	Husky Softball Stadium • Seattle, WA	W 11–3^{5}	30–5	3–2
Apr 5	No. 1 Arizona State	Husky Softball Stadium • Seattle, WA	W 3–2	31–5	4–2
Apr 10	at No. 7 UCLA	Easton Stadium • Los Angeles, CA	L 0–2^{11}	31–6	4–3
Apr 11	at UCLA	Easton Stadium • Los Angeles, CA	L 0–10^{5}	31–7	4–4
Apr 17	at Oregon	Jane Sanders Stadium • Eugene, OR	W 2–0	32–7	5–4
Apr 18	at Oregon State	Oregon State Softball Complex • Corvallis, OR	W 1–0^{9}	33–7	6–4
Apr 19	at Oregon State	Oregon State Softball Complex • Corvallis, OR	W 7–1	34–7	7–4
Apr 24	at No. 4 Arizona State	Alberta B. Farrington Softball Stadium • Tempe, AZ	L 2–9	34–8	7–5
Apr 25	at No. 7 Arizona	Rita Hillenbrand Memorial Stadium • Tucson, AZ	W 4–1	35–8	8–5
Apr 26	at No. 7 Arizona	Rita Hillenbrand Memorial Stadium • Tucson, AZ	L 0–11^{11}	35–9	8–6
Apr 29	No. 2 UCLA	Husky Softball Stadium • Seattle, WA	W 3–0	36–9	9–6

May
Date	Opponent	Site/stadium	Score	Overall record	Pac-10 record
May 1	Oregon State	Husky Softball Stadium • Seattle, WA	W 5–2	37–9	10–6
May 2	Oregon	Husky Softball Stadium • Seattle, WA	W 11–0^{5}	38–9	11–6
May 3	Oregon	Husky Softball Stadium • Seattle, WA	W 8–2	39–9	12–6
May 7	No. 2 Stanford	Husky Softball Stadium • Seattle, WA	W 7–0	40–9	13–6
May 8	No. 12 California	Husky Softball Stadium • Seattle, WA	L 0–1	40–10	13–7
May 9	No. 12 California	Husky Softball Stadium • Seattle, WA	W 11–3^{5}	41–10	14–7

Postseason

NCAA Amherst Regional
Date	Opponent	Site/stadium	Score	Overall record	NCAAT record
May 15	Sacred Heart	UMass Softball Complex • Amherst, MA	W 9–1^{5}	42–10	1–0
May 16	No. 21 UMass	UMass Softball Complex • Amherst, MA	W 3–1	43–10	2–0
May 17	No. 21 UMass	UMass Softball Complex • Amherst, MA	L 1–5	43–11	2–1
May 17	No. 21 UMass	UMass Softball Complex • Amherst, MA	W 6–1^{15}	44–11	3–1

NCAA Atlanta Super Regional
Date	Opponent	Site/stadium	Score	Overall record	SR Record
May 23	No. 14 Georgia Tech	Shirley Clements Mewborn Field • Atlanta, GA	W 7–1	45–11	1–0
May 24	No. 14 Georgia Tech	Shirley Clements Mewborn Field • Atlanta, GA	W 7–0	46–11	2–0

NCAA Women's College World Series
Date	Opponent	Rank (Seed)	Site/stadium	Score	Overall record	WCWS Record
May 28	No. 6 Georgia	ASA Hall of Fame Stadium • Oklahoma City, OK	W 3–1	47–11	1–0	
May 29	No. 10 Arizona State	ASA Hall of Fame Stadium • Oklahoma City, OK	W 1–0^{8}	48–11	2–0	
May 31	No. 6 Georgia	ASA Hall of Fame Stadium • Oklahoma City, OK	L 8–9^{9}	48–12	2–1	
May 31	No. 6 Georgia	ASA Hall of Fame Stadium • Oklahoma City, OK	W 9–3	49–12	3–1	
June 1	No. 1 Florida	ASA Hall of Fame Stadium • Oklahoma City, OK	W 8–0	50–12	4–1	
June 2	No. 1 Florida	ASA Hall of Fame Stadium • Oklahoma City, OK	W 3–2	51–12	5–1	
