= 2009 Arizona Wildcats softball team =

American college softball season

2009 Arizona Wildcats softball

NCAA Stanford Super Regional champion NCAA Louisville Regional champion

Women's College World Series, 0–2
- Conference: Pacific-10 Conference
- Record: 46–17 (13–7 Pac-10)
- Head coach: Mike Candrea (24th season)
- Home stadium: Rita Hillenbrand Memorial Stadium

2009 Pacific-10 Conference softball standings
	Conf.				Overall
Team	W		L	PCT	W		L	PCT
UCLA ‍†‍‍^{y}	16	–	5	.762	42	–	11	.792
Washington ‍‍‍^{y}	14	–	7	.667	51	–	12	.810
Arizona ‍‍‍^{y}	13	–	7	.650	46	–	17	.730
Stanford ‍‍‍^{y}	13	–	8	.619	48	–	11	.814
California ‍‍‍^{y}	10	–	10	.500	38	–	20	.655
Arizona State ‍‍‍^{y}	10	–	11	.476	47	–	19	.712
Oregon State ‍‍‍	4	–	17	.190	25	–	30	.455
Oregon ‍‍‍	3	–	18	.143	16	–	34	.320
† – Conference champion y – Invited to the NCAA tournament As of June 30, 2009; Rankings from Coaches' Poll

The 2009 Arizona Wildcats softball team represented the University of Arizona in the 2009 NCAA Division I softball season. The Wildcats were coached by Mike Candrea, who led his twenty-fourth season. The Wildcats finished with a record of 46–17. They competed in the Pacific-10 Conference, where they finished in third with a 13–7 record.

The Wildcats were invited to the 2009 NCAA Division I softball tournament, where they won the Louisville Regional and Stanford Super Regional and advanced to the Women's College World Series. They finished tied for seventh place with losses to fifth place Michigan and semifinalists Alabama.

== Personnel ==
=== Roster ===
2009 Arizona Wildcats roster
Pitchers: 3 - Sarah Akamine - Junior; 11 - Jennifer Martinez - Senior; 20 - Ashley Ralston-Alvarez - Junior; Catchers: 21 - Stacie Chambers - Sophomore; 29 - Mandy Monge - Senior; 90 - Lini Koria - Freshman	Infielders: 5 - Kristen Arriola - Freshman; 7 - K’Lee Arredondo - Junior; 17 - Victoria Kemp - Sophomore; 24 - Laine Roth - Senior; 25 - Corinna Gonzalez - Sophomore; 31 - Jenae Leles - Senior; 33 - Sam Banister - Senior; 42 - Alicia Banks - Freshman	Outfielders: 6 - Jill Malina - Senior; 15 - Karissa Buchanan - Freshman; 22 - Lauren Schutzler - Sophomore; 28 - Lindsey Sisk - Sophomore; 35 - Brittany Lastrapes - Sophomore

=== Coaches ===
2009 Arizona Wildcats softball coaching staff
- Mike Candrea - Head coach - 24th season
- Larry Ray - Assistant coach - 18th season
- Teresa Wilson - Assistant coach - 1st season

== Schedule ==
Legend
	Arizona win
	Arizona loss
*	Non-Conference game

2009 Arizona Wildcats softball game log
Regular season

February
Date	Opponent	Site/stadium	Score	Overall record	Pac-10 record
Feb 6	vs Kansas*	Alberta B. Farrington Softball Stadium • Tempe, AZ (Kajikawa Classic)	L 1–5	0–1	
Feb 6	vs UTEP*	Alberta B. Farrington Softball Stadium • Tempe, AZ (Kajikawa Classic)	W 8–5	1–1	
Feb 7	vs No. 9 Northwestern*	Alberta B. Farrington Softball Stadium • Tempe, AZ (Kajikawa Classic)	L 1–3	1–2	
Feb 7	vs No. 23 Nevada*	Alberta B. Farrington Softball Stadium • Tempe, AZ (Kajikawa Classic)	W 7–2	2–2	
Feb 12	vs Marshall*	USF Softball Stadium • Tampa, FL (USF Wilson Tournament)	W 10–4	3–2	
Feb 13	at South Florida*	USF Softball Stadium • Tampa, FL (USF Wilson Tournament)	W 7–2 ^{(8)}	4–2	
Feb 14	vs Illinois*	USF Softball Stadium • Tampa, FL (USF Wilson Tournament)	W 7–4	5–2	
Feb 14	at South Florida*	USF Softball Stadium • Tampa, FL (USF Wilson Tournament)	W 6–4	6–2	
Feb 15	vs Hofstra*	USF Softball Stadium • Tampa, FL (USF Wilson Tournament)	W 10–0 ^{(5)}	7–2	
Feb 20	North Dakota State*	Rita Hillenbrand Memorial Stadium • Tucson, AZ (Wildcat Invitational)	W 10–0 ^{(5)}	8–2	
Feb 20	Utah*	Rita Hillenbrand Memorial Stadium • Tucson, AZ (Wildcat Invitational)	W 16–1 ^{(5)}	9–2	
Feb 21	Utah*	Rita Hillenbrand Memorial Stadium • Tucson, AZ (Wildcat Invitational)	W 12–1 ^{(5)}	10–2	
Feb 21	North Dakota State*	Rita Hillenbrand Memorial Stadium • Tucson, AZ (Wildcat Invitational)	W 9–2	11–2	
Feb 22	North Dakota State*	Rita Hillenbrand Memorial Stadium • Tucson, AZ (Wildcat Invitational)	W 12–0 ^{(5)}	12–2	
Feb 22	Utah*	Rita Hillenbrand Memorial Stadium • Tucson, AZ (Wildcat Invitational)	W 6–1	13–2	
Feb 27	at No. 21 Texas A&M*	Aggie Softball Complex • College Station, TX	L 5–6 ^{(9)}	13–3	
Feb 28	at No. 21 Texas A&M*	Aggie Softball Complex • College Station, TX	W 9–4	14–3	

March
Date	Opponent	Site/stadium	Score	Overall record	Pac-10 record
Mar 1	at No. 21 Texas A&M*	Aggie Softball Complex • College Station, TX	L 4–5 ^{(8)}	14–4	
Mar 4	UTEP*	Rita Hillenbrand Memorial Stadium • Tucson, AZ (Hillenbrand Invitational)	W 20–1 ^{(5)}	15–4	
Mar 4	UTEP*	Rita Hillenbrand Memorial Stadium • Tucson, AZ (Hillenbrand Invitational)	W 5–2	16–4	
Mar 6	Minnesota*	Rita Hillenbrand Memorial Stadium • Tucson, AZ (Hillenbrand Invitational)	W 10–4	17–4	
Mar 6	Minnesota*	Rita Hillenbrand Memorial Stadium • Tucson, AZ (Hillenbrand Invitational)	W 20–3 ^{(5)}	18–4	
Mar 7	Creighton*	Rita Hillenbrand Memorial Stadium • Tucson, AZ (Hillenbrand Invitational)	L 0–6	18–5	
Mar 7	Creighton*	Rita Hillenbrand Memorial Stadium • Tucson, AZ (Hillenbrand Invitational)	W 19–2 ^{(5)}	19–5	
Mar 8	Saint Joseph's*	Rita Hillenbrand Memorial Stadium • Tucson, AZ (Hillenbrand Invitational)	W 14–5 ^{(5)}	20–5	
Mar 8	Saint Joseph's*	Rita Hillenbrand Memorial Stadium • Tucson, AZ (Hillenbrand Invitational)	W 20–1 ^{(5)}	21–5	
Mar 10	Simon Fraser*	Rita Hillenbrand Memorial Stadium • Tucson, AZ	W 9–1 ^{(5)}	22–5	
Mar 10	Simon Fraser*	Rita Hillenbrand Memorial Stadium • Tucson, AZ	W 11–0 ^{(5)}	23–5	
Mar 13	vs Texas*	Big League Dreams Sports Park • Cathedral City, CA (Mary Nutter Collegiate Classic)	W 6–5	24–5	
Mar 13	vs New Mexico*	Big League Dreams Sports Park • Cathedral City, CA (Mary Nutter Collegiate Classic)	W 9–1 ^{(5)}	25–5	
Mar 14	vs Penn State*	Big League Dreams Sports Park • Cathedral City, CA (Mary Nutter Collegiate Classic)	L 6–9	25–6	
Mar 14	vs Notre Dame*	Big League Dreams Sports Park • Cathedral City, CA (Mary Nutter Collegiate Classic)	W 10–1 ^{(5)}	26–6	
Mar 15	vs No. 10 Michigan*	Big League Dreams Sports Park • Cathedral City, CA (Mary Nutter Collegiate Classic)	L 1–4	26–7	
Mar 18	at New Mexico State*	NM State Softball Complex • Las Cruces, NM	W 8–5	27–7	
Mar 18	at New Mexico State*	NM State Softball Complex • Las Cruces, NM	W 10–5	28–7	
Mar 27	Oregon State	Rita Hillenbrand Memorial Stadium • Tucson, AZ	W 12–9	29–7	1–0
Mar 28	Oregon	Rita Hillenbrand Memorial Stadium • Tucson, AZ	W 11–3 ^{(5)}	30–7	2–0
Mar 29	Oregon	Rita Hillenbrand Memorial Stadium • Tucson, AZ	W 7–6	31–7	3–0

April
Date	Opponent	Site/stadium	Score	Overall record	Pac-10 record
Apr 3	at No. 3 Washington	Husky Softball Stadium • Seattle, WA	L 0–6	31–8	3–1
Apr 4	at No. 5 UCLA	Easton Stadium • Los Angeles, CA	W 9–2	32–8	4–1
Apr 5	at No. 5 UCLA	Easton Stadium • Los Angeles, CA	L 2–3	32–9	4–2
Apr 10	No. 5 Arizona State	Rita Hillenbrand Memorial Stadium • Tucson, AZ	W 10–8	33–9	5–2
Apr 17	No. 2 Stanford	Rita Hillenbrand Memorial Stadium • Tucson, AZ	W 12–4 ^{(6)}	34–9	6–2
Apr 18	No. 14 California	Rita Hillenbrand Memorial Stadium • Tucson, AZ	W 11–2 ^{(5)}	35–9	7–2
Apr 19	No. 14 California	Rita Hillenbrand Memorial Stadium • Tucson, AZ	W 7–5	36–9	8–2
Apr 24	No. 2 UCLA	Rita Hillenbrand Memorial Stadium • Tucson, AZ	L 1–2	36–10	8–3
Apr 25	No. 3 Washington	Rita Hillenbrand Memorial Stadium • Tucson, AZ	L 1–4	36–11	8–4
Apr 26	No. 3 Washington	Rita Hillenbrand Memorial Stadium • Tucson, AZ	W 11–0 ^{(5)}	37–11	9–4
Apr 29	at No. 6 Arizona State	Alberta B. Farrington Softball Stadium • Tempe, AZ	W 3–2	38–11	10–4
Apr 29	at No. 6 Arizona State	Alberta B. Farrington Softball Stadium • Tempe, AZ	W 10–6	39–11	11–4

May
Date	Opponent	Site/stadium	Score	Overall record	Pac-10 record
May 2	at No. 3 Stanford	Boyd & Jill Smith Family Stadium • Stanford, CA	L 3–4	39–12	11–5
May 3	at No. 3 Stanford	Boyd & Jill Smith Family Stadium • Stanford, CA	L 1–2	39–13	11–6
May 7	at Oregon	Howe Field • Eugene, OR	L 1–2 ^{(10)}	39–14	11–7
May 8	at Oregon State	Oregon State Softball Complex • Corvallis, OR	W 10–0 ^{(5)}	40–14	12–7
May 9	at Oregon State	Oregon State Softball Complex • Corvallis, OR	W 12–2	41–14	13–7

Postseason

NCAA Louisville Regional
Date	Opponent	Site/stadium	Score	Overall record	NCAAT record
May 15	UT Martin	Ulmer Stadium • Louisville, KY	W 9–3	42–14	1–0
May 16	No. 18 Louisville	Ulmer Stadium • Louisville, KY	W 18–4 ^{(5)}	43–14	2–0
May 17	Purdue	Ulmer Stadium • Louisville, KY	W 4–2	44–14	3–0

NCAA Stanford Super Regional
Date	Opponent	Site/stadium	Score	Overall record	NCAAT record
May 21	No. 5 Stanford	Boyd & Jill Smith Family Stadium • Stanford, CA	L 4–6	44–15	0–1
May 22	No. 5 Stanford	Boyd & Jill Smith Family Stadium • Stanford, CA	W 7–3	45–15	1–1
May 22	No. 5 Stanford	Boyd & Jill Smith Family Stadium • Stanford, CA	W 6–5	46–15	2–1

NCAA Women's College World Series
Date	Opponent	Site/stadium	Score	Overall record	WCWS Record
May 28	No. 1 Florida	ASA Hall of Fame Stadium • Oklahoma City, OK	L 0–3	46–16	0–1
May 30	No. 4 Alabama	ASA Hall of Fame Stadium • Oklahoma City, OK	L 0–14 ^{(5)}	46–17	0–2
