= Kimi Pohlman =

American former softball outfielder (born 1990)

- Outfielder
- Born: November 22, 1990 (age 35); Bellevue, Washington, U.S.
- Batted: Left Threw: Left

NPF debut
- June 5, 2013, for the Chicago Bandits

Last NPF appearance
- August 24, 2013, for the Chicago Bandits

NPF statistics
- Batting average: .311
- Runs: 22
- Hits: 33
- RBI: 13

Teams
- Washington Huskies (2009–2012); Chicago Bandits (2013)

Career highlights and awards
- Ringor Cup champion (2013); Women's College World Series champion (2009); Women's College World Series All-Tournament (2009); 3× first-team All-Pac-10/12 (2010–2012); Second-team All-Pac-10 (2009)

Kimberly Cheyne Pohlman (born November 22, 1990) is an American former softball outfielder. She played college softball at Washington and professionally for one season with the Chicago Bandits of National Pro Fastpitch in 2013.

== Early life and college career ==
Born in Bellevue, Washington and raised in nearby Sammamish, Pohlman attended The Bear Creek School in Redmond, Washington from second to eleventh grades. Although the school did not have a softball team, Pohlman played basketball, soccer, and track and field there and played on the Washington Ladyhawks softball team. In 2007, Pohlman transferred to Eastlake High School in Sammamish for her senior year and played on the softball team.

Attending the University of Washington, Pohlman played on the Washington Huskies softball team from 2009 to 2012 at outfielder. On the 2009 Women's College World Series championship team as a freshman, Pohlman had the second-best batting average on the team at .360 in 62 games with 56 starts, mostly at left field and was a second-team All-Pac-10 honoree. Batting .350 with 10 runs, one double, one RBI, and three stolen bases in the postseason, Pohlman made the Women's College World Series All-Tournament team. On June 2, 2009, in the 3–2 win over no. 1 Florida in the series-deciding third game of the World Series, Pohlman scored two runs, including one on an error that ultimately became the game winner.

As a sophomore in 2010, Pohlman batted .347 with 69 hits and 47 runs in 59 games (58 starts), earning first-team All-Pac-10 honors. Still starting at left field, Pohlman added right fielder to her outfield duties in 2010.

Earning her second straight first-team All-Pac-10 honors in 2011, Pohlman played 53 games including 52 starts in her junior season, batting .432 with 79 hits, 57 runs, 28 RBI, and three homers. In her senior year of 2012, when the Pac-10 became the Pac-12, Pohlman was a first-team all-conference honoree for the third straight time in 52 started games with a .366 batting average and a team-leading 64 hits. Pohlman played at center fielder more often beginning in 2011. Pohlman graduated from Washington in 2012 with a bachelor's degree in communications.

== Professional softball career ==
In the 2012 NPF Draft, the Chicago Bandits selected Pohlman second overall; Pohlman became the highest draft selection of any athlete in Washington history. Pohlman signed a one-year contract with the Bandits in March 2013. Helping the Bandits win the Ringor Cup regular season title and finish runners-up in the Cowles Cup championship series, Pohlman hit .306 with 33 hits and 13 RBI in 45 games.
