= 2009 Florida Gators softball team =

American college softball season

2009 Florida Gators softball

SEC regular-season champions SEC Tournament Champions

SEC Tournament Championship Game, W 8-5 vs. Alabama
- Conference: Southeastern Conference
- East
- Record: 65–3 (26–1 SEC)
- Head coach: Tim Walton
- Assistant coach: Jennifer Rocha, Jenny Gladding
- Home stadium: Katie Seashole Pressly Softball Stadium

The 2009 Florida Gators softball team represented the University of Florida softball program for the 2009 NCAA softball season. The Gators compiled an overall record of 63–5 and completed its SEC regular season with a record of 26–1. They finished second in the nation after losing to the Washington Huskies in the WCWS Championship Series. The 2009 team broke the SEC single-season home runs record (86) and several school records including grand slams in a season (12), total shutouts (39), and consecutive shutouts (11). Aja Paculba set the single season stolen base record (27), Francesca Enea broke the career home run record (41), and the Florida pitching staff threw three no-hitters in the regular season (Stephanie Brombacher vs. Coastal Carolina and Stacey Nelson vs. Ole Miss and Arkansas). Stacey Nelson was named the Lowe's Senior CLASS Award winner and the SEC Pitcher of the year for the second straight year, and five Gators were given Louisville Slugger/NFCA All-American honors. Stacey Nelson was named to the first team (pitcher), and Stephanie Brombacher (pitcher), Francesca Enea (outfielder), Kelsey Bruder (outfielder), and Aja Paculba (second baseman) were named to the second team.

== Previous season ==
The 2008 Gators went 70–5 overall and 27–1 in SEC play. The 70 wins set an NCAA single season record and Florida, named the #1 overall seed in the NCAA tournament, advanced to the semifinals of the Women's College World Series. They also were the SEC regular season and tournament champions. Five Gators were named All-Americans (Stacey Nelson, Kim Waleszonia, Aja Paculba, Francesca Enea, and Ali Gardiner) and Junior pitcher Stacey Nelson was the SEC Pitcher of the Year.

== Pre-season ==
With all but one starter from the 2008 team returning, the Gators were voted the pre-season #1.

== Schedule ==
Date	Time	Opponent	Rank^{#}	Site	Result	Attendance	Winning Pitcher	Losing Pitcher
Feb 6, 2009*	6:00 PM	Baylor Bears	#1	Katie Seashole Pressly Softball Stadium • Gainesville, FL	W 3–0	864	Stacey Nelson	Whitney Canion
Feb 7, 2009*	1:00 PM	Baylor Bears	#1	Katie Seashole Pressly Softball Stadium • Gainesville, FL	W 8-0 (6)	1572	Stephanie Brombacher	Shaina Brock
Feb 8, 2009*	1:00 PM	Baylor Bears	#1	Katie Seashole Pressly Softball Stadium • Gainesville, FL	L 0–1	1084	Whitney Canion	Stacey Nelson
Feb 11, 2009*	5:00 PM	@ Jacksonville Dolphins	#2	JU Softball Complex • Jacksonville, FL	W 11-0 (6)	1387	Stephanie Brombacher	Sarah Sigrest
Lipton Invitational
Feb 13, 2009*	5:00 PM	Texas Tech Red Raiders	#2	Katie Seashole Pressly Softball Stadium • Gainesville, FL	W 11-0 (5)	815	Stacey Nelson	Ashly Jacobs
Feb 13, 2009*	7:15 PM	@ Coastal Carolina Chanticleers	#2	Katie Seashole Pressly Softball Stadium • Gainesville, FL	W 8-0 (5)	815	Stephanie Brombacher	Katelin Edwards
Feb 14, 2009*	12:30 PM	Florida Atlantic Owls	#2	Katie Seashole Pressly Softball Stadium • Gainesville, FL	W 13-0 (5)	915	Stacey Nelson	Amber Barton
Feb 14, 2009*	2:45 PM	@ South Alabama Jaguars	#2	Katie Seashole Pressly Softball Stadium • Gainesville, FL	W 13-0 (5)	915	Stephanie Brombacher	Beth Pilgrim
Feb 15, 2009*	2:30 PM	Georgia Tech Yellow Jackets	#2	Katie Seashole Pressly Softball Stadium • Gainesville, FL	W 11-1 (6)	1045	Stacey Nelson	Jessica Coan
Cathedral City Classic
Feb 19, 2009*	6:30 PM	@ #14 Fresno State Bulldogs	#2	Fenway Field • Cathedral City, CA	W 8-0 (5)	312	Stephanie Brombacher	Morgan Melloh
Feb 19, 2009*	11:30 PM	#3 Arizona State Sun Devils	#2	Fenway Field • Cathedral City, CA	W 8–2	135	Stacey Nelson	Megan Elliot
Feb 20, 2009*	4:00 PM	#17 Nevada Wolf Pack	#2	Des Moines Field • Cathedral City, CA	W 5–0	304	Stephanie Brombacher	Katie Holverson
Feb 20, 2009*	9:30 PM	#7 Washington Huskies	#2	Fenway Field • Cathedral City, CA	L 0-1 (9)	621	Danielle Lawrie	Stacey Nelson
Feb 21, 2009*	2:30 PM	UNLV Rebels	#2	Yankee Field • Cathedral City, CA	W 5–1	366	Stephanie Brombacher	Stephanie Bregante
Feb 25, 2009*	4:00 PM	#6 Michigan Wolverines	#2	Katie Seashole Pressly Softball Stadium • Gainesville, FL	W 4–0	1013	Stacey Nelson	Nikki Nemitz
Cox Invitational
Feb 27, 2009*	4:00 PM	Pacific Tigers	#2	Katie Seashole Pressly Softball Stadium • Gainesville, FL	W 10–5	982	Stephanie Brombacher	Heidi Helberg
Feb 27, 2009*	6:15 PM	South Florida Bulls	#2	Katie Seashole Pressly Softball Stadium • Gainesville, FL	W 8-0 (6)	982	Stacey Nelson	Kristen Gordon
Feb 28, 2009*	4:00 PM	Illinois Fighting Illini	#2	Katie Seashole Pressly Softball Stadium • Gainesville, FL	W 9-1 (6)	1377	Stacey Nelson	Monica Perry
Feb 28, 2009*	6:15 PM	Texas Tech Red Raiders	#2	Katie Seashole Pressly Softball Stadium • Gainesville, FL	W 7–3	1377	Stephanie Brombacher	Alex Watkins
Mar 1, 2009*	12:15 PM	Illinois Fighting Illini	#2	Katie Seashole Pressly Softball Stadium • Gainesville, FL	W 7-2 (6)	584	Stacey Nelson	Monica Perry
Mar 1, 2009*	2:30 PM	South Florida Bulls	#2	Katie Seashole Pressly Softball Stadium • Gainesville, FL	W 9-1 (5)	584	Stephanie Brombacher	Brittany Bowles
Mar 7, 2009	1:00 PM	@ South Carolina Gamecocks	#2	Beckham Field • Columbia, SC	W 4-2 (8)	378	Stacey Nelson	Audrey Broyles
Mar 7, 2009	3:15 PM	@ South Carolina Gamecocks	#2	Beckham Field • Columbia, SC	W 3–1	378	Stephanie Brombacher	Krystle Robinson
Mar 8, 2009	1:00 PM	@ South Carolina Gamecocks	#2	Beckham Field • Columbia, SC	W 6–0	182	Stacey Nelson	Audrey Broyles
Mar 11, 2009	4:00 PM	#8 Georgia Bulldogs	#1	Katie Seashole Pressly Softball Stadium • Gainesville, FL	W 15-0 (5)	927	Stacey Nelson	Christie Hamilton
Mar 11, 2009	6:15 PM	#8 Georgia Bulldogs	#1	Katie Seashole Pressly Softball Stadium • Gainesville, FL	W 4–0	927	Stephanie Brombacher	Christie Hamilton
Mar 14, 2009	2:00 PM	@ Ole Miss Rebels	#1	Ole Miss Softball Complex • Oxford, MS	W 2–0	145	Stacey Nelson	Becky Nye
Mar 14, 2009	4:15 PM	@ Ole Miss Rebels	#1	Ole Miss Softball Complex • Oxford, MS	W 12–0	145	Stephanie Brombacher	Lindsey Perry
Mar 15, 2009	2:00 PM	@ Ole Miss Rebels	#1	Ole Miss Softball Complex • Oxford, MS	W 4–0	134	Stacey Nelson	Becky Nye
Mar 18, 2009*	4:00 PM	FIU Golden Panthers	#1	Katie Seashole Pressly Softball Stadium • Gainesville, FL	W 3–2	732	Stacey Nelson	Kasey Barrett
Mar 18, 2009*	6:15 PM	FIU Golden Panthers	#1	Katie Seashole Pressly Softball Stadium • Gainesville, FL	W 5–0	732	Stephanie Brombacher	Jennifer Gniadek
Mar 21, 2009	1:00 PM	#6 Tennessee Volunteers	#1	Katie Seashole Pressly Softball Stadium • Gainesville, FL	W 7–0	1677	Stacey Nelson	Cat Hosfield
Mar 21, 2009	3:15 PM	#6 Tennessee Volunteers	#1	Katie Seashole Pressly Softball Stadium • Gainesville, FL	W 7–0	1677	Stephanie Brombacher	Danielle Pieroni
Mar 22, 2009	1:00 PM	#6 Tennessee Volunteers	#1	Katie Seashole Pressly Softball Stadium • Gainesville, FL	W 4–1	1206	Stacey Nelson	Cat Hosfield
Mar 28, 2009	1:00 PM	#4 Alabama Crimson Tide	#1	Katie Seashole Pressly Softball Stadium • Gainesville, FL	W 9-1 (6)	2423	Stacey Nelson	Kelsi Dunne
Mar 28, 2009	3:15 PM	#4 Alabama Crimson Tide	#1	Katie Seashole Pressly Softball Stadium • Gainesville, FL	W 10-1 (5)	2423	Stephanie Brombacher	Charlotte Morgan
Mar 29, 2009	2:00 PM	#4 Alabama Crimson Tide	#1	Katie Seashole Pressly Softball Stadium • Gainesville, FL	L 4–6	1381	Kelsi Dunne	Stacey Nelson
Apr 1, 2009	5:00 PM	@ Auburn Tigers	#1	Jane B. Moore Field • Auburn, AL	W 3–0	116	Stacey Nelson	Anna Thompson
Apr 1, 2009	7:15 PM	@ Auburn Tigers	#1	Jane B. Moore Field • Auburn, AL	W 7–1	116	Stacey Nelson	Jenee Loree
Apr 4, 2009	1:00 PM	Mississippi State Bulldogs	#1	Katie Seashole Pressly Softball Stadium • Gainesville, FL	W 11-2 (5)	994	Stacey Nelson	Kelsey Nurnberg
Apr 4, 2009	3:15 PM	Mississippi State Bulldogs	#1	Katie Seashole Pressly Softball Stadium • Gainesville, FL	W 6–2	994	Stacey Nelson	Lindsay Dunlap
Apr 5, 2009	1:00 PM	Mississippi State Bulldogs	#1	Katie Seashole Pressly Softball Stadium • Gainesville, FL	W 3–0	1011	Stacey Nelson	Lindsay Dunlap
Apr 8, 2009*	6:00 PM	#21 Florida State Seminoles	#1	Katie Seashole Pressly Softball Stadium • Gainesville, FL	W 4-3 (9)	2398	Stacey Nelson	Terese Gober
Apr 11, 2009	10:00 AM	@ @ Kentucky Wildcats	#1	UK Softball Complex • Lexington, KY	W 1-0 (9)	690	Stacey Nelson	Rachel Riley
Apr 11, 2009	12:00 PM	@ @ Kentucky Wildcats	#1	UK Softball Complex • Lexington, KY	W 6–0	690	Stephanie Brombacher	Amber Matousek
Apr 15, 2009*	6:00 PM	UCF Knights	#1	Katie Seashole Pressly Softball Stadium • Gainesville, FL	W 3–0	1327	Stephanie Brombacher	Magon Paul
Apr 18, 2009	2:00 PM	@ #18 @ LSU Tigers	#1	Tiger Park • Baton Rouge, LA	W 3–0	1679	Stacey Nelson	Cody Trahan
Apr 18, 2009	4:15 PM	@ #18 @ LSU Tigers	#1	Tiger Park • Baton Rouge, LA	W 1–0	1679	Stephanie Brombacher	Brittany Mack
Apr 19, 2009	2:00 PM	@ #18 @ LSU Tigers	#1	Tiger Park • Baton Rouge, LA	W 12-0 (5)	1358	Stacey Nelson	Cody Trahan
Apr 25, 2009	1:00 PM	Arkansas Razorbacks	#1	Katie Seashole Pressly Softball Stadium • Gainesville, FL	W 11-0 (5)	1211	Stacey Nelson	Layne McGuirt
Apr 25, 2009	3:15 PM	Arkansas Razorbacks	#1	Katie Seashole Pressly Softball Stadium • Gainesville, FL	W 11-0 (5)	1211	Stacey Nelson	Miranda Dixon
Apr 26, 2009	1:00 PM	Arkansas Razorbacks	#1	Katie Seashole Pressly Softball Stadium • Gainesville, FL	W 6–0	907	Stacey Nelson	Kim Jones
May 2, 2009*	3:00 PM	Longwood Lancers	#1	Katie Seashole Pressly Softball Stadium • Gainesville, FL	W 11-0 (5)	1266	Stacey Nelson	Brittany Spencer
May 2, 2009*	5:15 PM	Longwood Lancers	#1	Katie Seashole Pressly Softball Stadium • Gainesville, FL	W 6–0	1266	Stephanie Brombacher	Briana Wells
May 3, 2009*	1:00 PM	Longwood Lancers	#1	Katie Seashole Pressly Softball Stadium • Gainesville, FL	W 3–1	1306	Stacey Nelson	Briana Wells
SEC Tournament
May 7, 2009	5:00 PM	Auburn Tigers	#1	Sherri Parker Lee Softball Stadium • Knoxville, TN	W 3–0	1256	Stacey Nelson	Anna Thompson
May 8, 2009	7:30 PM	#18 Tennessee Volunteers	#1	Sherri Parker Lee Softball Stadium • Knoxville, TN	W 11-3 (5)	1132	Stacey Nelson	Cat Hosfield
May 9, 2009	1:30 PM	#5 Alabama Crimson Tide	#1	Sherri Parker Lee Softball Stadium • Knoxville, TN	W 8–5	922	Stacey Nelson	Kelsi Dunne
NCAA Regionals
May 14, 2009	6:00 PM	Florida A&M Rattlers	#1	Katie Seashole Pressly Softball Stadium • Gainesville, FL	W 12-0 (5)	1414	Stephanie Brombacher	Amanda Reyes
May 15, 2009	1:00 PM	Texas A&M Aggies	#1	Katie Seashole Pressly Softball Stadium • Gainesville, FL	W 7–1	1583	Stacey Nelson	Rhiannon Kliesing
May 16, 2009	1:00 PM	Lehigh Mountain Hawks	#1	Katie Seashole Pressly Softball Stadium • Gainesville, FL	W 9–0	1526	Stacey Nelson	Lisa Sweeney
NCAA Super Regionals
May 24, 2009	10:00 AM	#14 California Golden Bears	#1	Katie Seashole Pressly Softball Stadium • Gainesville, FL	W 2–0	2045	Stacey Nelson	Marissa Drewery
May 24, 2009	12:30 PM	@ #14 California Golden Bears	#1	Katie Seashole Pressly Softball Stadium • Gainesville, FL	W 2–1	2045	Stacey Nelson	Valerie Arioto
Women's College World Series
May 28, 2009	9:00 PM	#6 Arizona Wildcats	#1	ASA Hall of Fame Stadium • Oklahoma City, OK	W 3–0	6483	Stacey Nelson	Lindsey Sisk
May 29, 2009	9:00 PM	@ #7 Michigan Wolverines	#1	ASA Hall of Fame Stadium • Oklahoma City, OK	W 1–0	8323	Stacey Nelson	Nikki Nemitz
May 31, 2009	3:00 PM	#4 Alabama Crimson Tide	#1	ASA Hall of Fame Stadium • Oklahoma City, OK	W 6–5	7172	Stephanie Brombacher	Kelsi Dunne
Jun 1, 2009	8:00 PM	#3 Washington Huskies	#1	ASA Hall of Fame Stadium • Oklahoma City, OK	L 0–8	6060	Danielle Lawrie	Stacey Nelson
Jun 2, 2009	8:00 PM	@ #3 Washington Huskies	#1	ASA Hall of Fame Stadium • Oklahoma City, OK	L 2–3	5807	Danielle Lawrie	Stacey Nelson
*Non-Conference Game. ^{#}Rankings from NFCA released prior to game.All times are in Eastern Time Zone.

== Game notes ==
=== Baylor (Game 1) ===
	1	2	3	4	5	6	7	R	H	E
Bears	0	0	0	0	0	0	-	0	6	1
Gators	0	1	1	1	0	X	-	3	4	0

The season opener for both squads stayed scoreless until the bottom of the 2nd when Francesca Enea, on third base because of a walk and a single from Tiffany DeFelice, scored on a passed ball. Hilberth also scored on a passed ball, this time in the bottom of the 3rd, after singling, stealing second, and advancing to third on an error by catcher Jordan Vannatta. Number 2 hitter Aja Paculba was walked in between strike outs by Kim Waleszonia and Ali Gardiner, and successfully stole second during the latter. She advanced to third on the same passed ball that scored Hilberth, and after Enea was intentionally walked, the Gators attempted a double steal, but caught in a pickle between 3rd and home, Paculba was caught for the final out of the inning. The Gators only other run of the night came on a solo shot from right fielder Kelsey Bruder (graduated senior Mary Ratliff's replacement and only new starter from the previous season).

Baylor threatened in the top of the 4th when Alex Colyer and Courtney Oberg consecutively singled, then both advanced on a sacrifice bunt from Tiffany Wesley. The Gator defense forced a ground out and line out to retire the side.

=== Baylor (Game 2) ===
	1	2	3	4	5	6	7	R	H	E
Bears	0	0	0	0	0	0	-	0	1	2
Gators	3	2	0	0	1	2	-	8	9	0

The Gators got on the board early when Francesca Enea homered to left field, also bringing home Aja Paculba who was walked and Ali Gardiner who singled. Then, in the 2nd, Corrie Brooks doubled, Megan Bush hit a sacrifice bunt to move her to third, and Michelle Moultrie hit a sacrifice fly to left field to bring her home. Center fielder Kim Waleszonia immediately homered, making the game 5–0 in favor of Florida. Two innings later, in the bottom of 5th, Paculba added to the Gators' home run total, bringing the lead to six. Gardiner was hit by a pitch, Lauren Heil (who was pinch running for Gardiner) stole second, and advanced to third on a throwing error by catcher Courtney Oberg. After Kelsey Bruder was walked, Brooks singled and both she and Bruder advanced an extra base as the Bears attempted, but failed to prevent Heil from scoring. In the bottom of the 6th, Alicia Sisco pinch hit for Moultrie and got her first collegiate hit. Paculba doubled to center field to score Sisco after she advanced to second on a walk of Hilberth. Up by eight, the game ended because of the mercy rule.

Baylor never threatened as Gator pitcher Stephanie Brombacher held them to one hit, one walk, and one hit by pitch. She also had 8 strikeouts in 6.0 innings.

=== Baylor (Game 3) ===
	1	2	3	4	5	6	7	R	H	E
Bears	0	0	0	0	1	0	-	1	1	0
Gators	0	0	0	0	0	0	-	0	3	2

Although the Gators had chances in this game, namely in the bottom of the 1st with two runners in scoring position and 1 out, they were not able to capitalize. The game was methodical for innings two through four, but the top of the fifth saw Baylor take its first lead in the three-game series. Catcher Courtney Oberg singled to left field, left fielder Tiffany Wesley reached on an error by pitcher Stacey Nelson while Oberg's pinch runner made it to third, and she scored after the second error of the inning by shortstop Megan Bush. Nelson quickly forced Meagan Weldon into a groundout to limit the damage to one run. The only offense generated by the Gators after that was a single by Bush in the bottom of the 5th. Nelson took the loss for the Gators.

=== Jacksonville ===
	1	2	3	4	5	6	7	R	H	E
Gators	0	0	1	0	2	8	-	11	10	1
Dolphins	0	0	0	0	0	0	-	0	2	0

The Gators bounced back from their first loss of the season, scoring 11 runs in 6 innings. The first scoring of the day happened in the top of the third when Kim Waleszonia, Aja Paculba, and Ali Gardiner had back-to-back-to-back singles, the third of which scored Waleszonia. Two innings later, Megan Bush took a lead-off walk, was moved over to 2nd on a sacrifice bunt by Michelle Moultrie and to 3rd on a groundout by Waleszonia. All the small ball proved unnecessary as Paculba homered to left field, increasing Florida's lead to 3.

The Gators proved that their entire lineup is dangerous at the plate in the top of the sixth. Francesca Enea took first on a hit by pitch to start off the inning, and Brooke Johnson, who was brought in to pinch run, stole second. Tiffany DeFelice was walked, Kelsey Bruder singled to left to score Johnson, Corrie Brooks, Bush, and pinch hitter Kristine Priebe were all consecutively walked to bring in 2 runs, and Brooks scored on a wild pitch. Waleszonia then successfully bunted and Paculba singled to score two more runs and keep the bases loaded. Enea's double brought in Priebe and Waleszonia and put both herself and Paculba in scoring position. After DeFelice singled and Paculba scored, the Bears were able to finally end the inning.

=== Texas Tech (Lipton Invitational) ===
	1	2	3	4	5	6	7	R	H	E
Red Raiders	0	0	0	0	0	-	-	0	2	1
Gators	2	0	8	1	X	-	-	11	13	0

In only 4 innings of offense, the Gators managed to match their season best in runs with 11. In order to breathe some life into the lineup, Aja Paculba moved to the leadup spot and Kim Waleszonia moved behind her. The switch brought instant results in the first inning as Paculba took walk, Waleszonia singled, and Francesca Enea doubled to score them both. After failing to score in the second, Florida repeated their 8-run performance from the Jacksonville game in the third. Waleszonia bunted, and Ali Gardiner homered to start off the inning. Tiffany DeFelice got to first on a walk, and then to third on a double by Kelsey Bruder. Both scored on the follow-up double from third baseman Corrie Brooks. After Megan Bush was hit by a pitch, Hilberth singled to score Brooks, and Paculba singled to score Bush, Waleszonia was able to get on-board and Hilberth scored because of an error on Red Raider third baseman Danielle Matthews. Gardiner's single set the final run of the frame across the plate as a fielder's choice and a 6-2-5 double play would end the inning. The Gators scored in the 4th on a single from Bruder, walk on Brooks, fielder's choices from Bush and Hilberth, and double from Paculba that would allow Brooks's pinch runner to get home.

Stacey Nelson recorded the win for the Gators and only gave up a single hit while walking none, hitting none, and striking out eight. Also, if not for the one hit, Nelson would have pitched a perfect game.

=== Coastal Carolina (Lipton Invitational) ===
	1	2	3	4	5	6	7	R	H	E
Gators	2	4	2	0	0	-	-	8	6	2
Chanticleers	0	0	0	0	0	-	-	0	0	3

In another mercy-rule-ended game, Florida Sophomore pitcher Stephanie Brombacher threw a no-hitter for the first time in her career.

In the top half of the first, Aja Paculba was walked and stole second, then made it to third on a passed ball, and Kim Waleszonia tripled to score her. Waleszonia scored on a sacrifice fly from Francesca Enea to make it 2–0 in favor of the Gators. In the second, Kristine Priebe hit a 2 RBI homer to center field before Paculba and Waleszonia basically mimicked their performances from the first. Paculba was walked and stole second, but instead of advancing to third on a passed ball, she passed the base on her way home after Waleszonia tripled again. She would get home on Francesca Enea's single. At the start of the third, Kelsey Bruder doubled, and Corrie Brooks was hit by a pitch before they successfully completed the double steal. They would both score on an error by the Chanticleers' shortstop. The game ended after five innings with Florida taking the game 8–0.

=== Florida Atlantic (Lipton Invitational) ===
	1	2	3	4	5	6	7	R	H	E
Owls	0	0	0	0	0	-	-	0	2	1
Gators	1	8	4	0	X	-	-	13	13	0

The Florida Atlantic Owls managed only two hits against Florida pitcher Stacey Nelson and failed to get any runs on the board. The Gators on the other hand, continued their streak of mercy-rule finishes, beating FAU 13–0. After scoring a single run in the first by way of an Aja Paculba homer, Florida poured it on in the second. Owl pitcher Amber Barton surrendered a leadoff walk that became a run after Megan Bush doubled to center field. After catcher Kristina Hilberth singled and Paculba walked, the bases were loaded for Francesca Enea, who proceeded to knock one over the center field wall for a grand slam. Kristine Priebe followed suit a few batters later, but not before Kelsey Bruder and Corrie Brooks got on base with a walk and a single respectively. The Gators added to their already impressive lead in the bottom of the third after loading the bases again. Hilberth and Paculba singled, and Kim Waleszonia reached on a fielder's choice so that when Ali Gardiner and Enea consecutively singled, two runs scored for the home team. Then Bruder sacrificed herself to bring Waleszonia home, and Priebe singled to do the same for Gardiner.

=== South Alabama (Lipton Invitational) ===
	1	2	3	4	5	6	7	R	H	E
Gators	2	0	1	6	4	-	-	13	13	0
Jaguars	0	0	0	0	0	-	-	0	1	1

The 13–0 win against the South Alabama Jaguars marked Florida's fifth straight shutout and fourth straight five-inning game. In the top of the first, the "visiting" Gators got two runs off four singles from Kim Waleszonia, Ali Gardiner, Kelsey Bruder, and Corrie Brooks. Waleszonia and Gardiner came back in the third with back-to-back triples, allowing the former to easily score. Florida scored six more times in the fourth, including Francesca Enea's second grand slam of the day (the first coming in the game against Florida Atlantic). Shortstop Megan Bush, catcher Kristina Hilberth, and second baseman Aja Paculba were all walked with one out. Pinch hitter Michelle Moultrie was then hit by a pitch and Gardiner reached on a fielder's choice that still allowed Hilberth to score. That was when Enea stepped to the plate and homered very close to the foul poll. She became the first player in Florida history to hit two grand slams on the same day. An inning later, the scoring parade continued for the Gators. Le-Net Franklin, who stayed in the game for Bush, Hilberth, and Paculba all singled to start off the inning, and after a fielder's choice forced Franklin out at the plate, Gardiner singled to score Hilberth. Enea hit a single to right center to allow Paculba to score, Bruder reached on an error by the Jaguar shortstop to score Moultrie, and Brooks scored Gardiner on a fielder's choice that forced out Bruder.

=== Georgia Tech (Lipton Invitational) ===
	1	2	3	4	5	6	7	R	H	E
Yellow Jackets	0	0	0	1	0	0	-	1	4	0
Gators	1	5	1	0	0	4	-	11	12	0

In the bottom of the first, Aja Paculba drew a lead-off walk on a full count. After Kim Waleszonia flew out to center, Ali Gardiner belted a double into left field, scoring Paculba and giving the Gators an early 1–0 lead. In the second, Corrie Brooks started things off with a single before Megan Bush sacrificed herself to move Brooks to second. Paculba then knocked a 2 RBI home run over the left field fence to give Florida a 3-run lead. After Waleszonia was plunked in the back by a pitch, Gardiner then doubled again, this time to right field, easily scoring Waleszonia. Francesca Enea sent the first pitch she saw over the left field wall for her fifth home run of the season. Georgia Tech's only run of the game and Florida's first earned run of the season came in the fourth on Tiffany Johnson's one-out bases-loaded fielder's choice to score Kelly Eppinger.

Florida tacked on yet another run in the bottom of the third when Megan Bush doubled on a blooper to shallow left field. Kristina Hilberth then shot a sharp-hit single to center. As Bush slid into home for a play at the plate, the Yellow Jackets’ catcher was called for interference, awarding Bush the run. The Gators ended the game on the mercy rule when Brooks bombed one to dead center with the bases loaded for her first career grand slam. Gardiner and Enea walked and Kelsey Bruder singled to load the bases for Brooks, who had Florida 3rd grand slam of the year.

=== Fresno State (Cathedral City Classic) ===
	1	2	3	4	5	6	7	R	H	E
Gators	2	1	0	0	5	-	-	8	5	0
Bulldogs	0	0	0	0	0	-	-	0	3	1

In their first game of the Cathedral City Classic, the Gators forced another mercy-ruled ended game, this time against the No. 14 Fresno State Bulldogs. In the first, after Aja Paculba drew a lead-off walk and two quick outs, left fielder Francesca Enea belted one over the fence in left center. In the bottom of the inning, the Bulldogs managed to get their first two batters on board with back-to-back singles, but three straight outs ended the threat. Florida scored again in the second to make it 3-0 when Kim Waleszonia singled to center with runners on first and second because of a hit by pitch and a walk.

The Gators put the game away in the top of the fifth inning, recording five runs all with two outs. Enea drew a walk to get things started. Brooke Johnson pinch ran for her and immediately stole second to put herself in scoring position. Kelsey Bruder smacked a single to left field to move Johnson to third. Then, Corrie Brooks came through, slamming one to center field to drive in Johnson and Bruder. Kristine Priebe was sent to pinch hit for Michelle Moultrie and walked. That's when Megan Bush hit her first home run of the year with a three-run bomb to left, nailing "Fenway Park's" Green Monster replica. With an eight-run lead after the fifth, the game ended.

=== Arizona State (Cathedral City Classic) ===
	1	2	3	4	5	6	7	R	H	E
Sun Devils	1	0	0	0	0	0	1	2	5	2
Gators	0	0	0	0	8	0	X	8	8	1

After the defending champion Sun Devils loaded the bases in the top of the first with a hit by pitch, an error by third baseman Corrie Brooks, and a walk, pitcher Stacey Nelson struck out cleanup hitter Krista Donnewirth to get the first out of the inning. Katelyn Boyd then recorded the first hit for Arizona State to allow Jessica Maples to score. Kaylyn Castillo then reached on a fielder's choice grounder that forced Lesley Rogers out at home, and Caylyn Carlson struck out swinging to end the threat.

The score remained 1–0 in favor of the Sun Devils until a huge 8-run 5th put the Gators on top for good. First up to the plate for Florida in the fifth was Sophomore shortstop Megan Bush. Bush sent the ball over the left field wall to tie the game at 1-all. Catcher and number nine hitter Kristina Hilberth reached second on a two-base error on Sun Devil center fielder Kaitlin Cochran. Aja Paculba and Kim Waleszonia both grounded out, but Waleszonia's allowed Hilberth to move on to third. Ali Gardiner earned herself an RBI when she hit a single into left field to score Hilberth. Pitcher Megan Elliott unintentionally walked cleanup hitter Francesca Enea to move Michelle Moultrie, pinch runner Gardiner, into scoring position. Making up for her error earlier, Brooks put the Gators up 4–1 when her double down the left field line allowed Moultrie and Enea to score (Ami Austin came in to pinch run for Brooks). Elliot next put herself in a jam that would be cleaned-up by Bush. After Elliot walked Kelsey Bruder and hit Kristine Priebe with a pitch to load the bases, Bush blasted her first pitch over the wall in center field for a grand slam. Hilberth doubled and Paculba flied out to center to end in the marathon inning that saw Florida take a 7-run lead.

Arizona State managed to score a run in the final inning with Rogers's two-out double that scored Maples, who was on base because of a walk. Nelson struck out Cochran to end the game.

=== Nevada (Cathedral City Classic) ===
	1	2	3	4	5	6	7	R	H	E
Wolf Pack	0	0	0	0	0	0	0	0	8	2
Gators	0	2	2	1	0	0	X	5	6	0

The Gators scored their first runs in the top of the second when Corrie Brooks walked and moved to second on a single to left field by Kelsey Bruder. Kristine Priebe laid down a sacrifice bunt to move both runners into scoring position. Megan Bush walked to load the bases, and Aja Paculba recorded her first hit of the tournament on a two-out single (she had 2 at-bats in 8 plate appearances), scoring Brooks. A throwing error by the center fielder moved the runners along, including Bruder, who crossed the plate to give the Gators a 2–0 lead. The Gators added another run its next time up as Ali Gardiner belted one to deep center field. The ball hit off the outfield fence as Gardiner rolled into second base for her third double of the season. Francesca Enea was walked and both runners were replaced on the base path by pinch runners Lauren Heil and Brooke Johnson. After a pitching switch, Brooks grounded back to the pitcher to advance the runners to second and third. Bruder stepped up to the plate and nailed a two-RBI single. The Gators tallied their final run in the fourth. Paculba singled up the middle and stole second to put herself in scoring position. Kim Waleszonia smoked a triple to deep right-center field, allowing Paculba to cross the plate.

The Wolfpack's biggest scoring threat came in the top of the second. With bases loaded off a fielder's choice and two singles, Stephanie Brombacher got out of the jam able by forcing the nine-spot hitter out on a fly ball to second baseman Paculba. In the fifth, two singles put runners on first and second with only one out. Brombacher forced the following two batters to ground out to end the inning.

=== Washington (Cathedral City Classic) ===
	1	2	3	4	5	6	7	8	9	R	H	E
Huskies	0	0	0	0	0	0	0	0	1	1	5	1
Gators	0	0	0	0	0	0	0	0	0	0	2	0

The Gators' offense came up short in this 9-inning pitcher's duel. Senior Stacey Nelson lost her second 1–0 game of the season as her teammates could not muster enough hits against Washington's ace Danielle Lawrie. Kim Waleszonia was the only Gator to have any success against the Canadian Olympian, earning two base hits. It took nine innings for Washington to score the only run of the game. It was Kimi Pohlman, who was 0-for-2 with two strikeouts against Nelson, who came up for the Huskies, singling to center field to score Amanda Fleischman, who started on second due to extra-inning tournament rules. The Gators kept it to the lone run as Francesca Enea made her second diving catch of the night to record the first out. With two outs, Ashlyn Watson hit a grounder up the middle, but second baseman Aja Pacubla made the grab and fired to Corrie Brooks, who found catcher Kristina Hilberth to get Pohlman at the plate. In the bottom of the ninth with Paculba placed at second, Waleszonia recorded her second single against Lawrie, bunting for a base hit and moving Paculba to third. Waleszonia used her speed to steal second. With runners in scoring position, Enea grounded to the second baseman who threw home to tag Paculba out at the plate. Lawrie ended the game by striking out Brooks. The Gators’ largest threat came in their first at bat as Paculba drew a lead off walk. The speedster stole second and moved to third as the Huskies’ catcher threw to an empty bag and the ball headed into center field. Ali Gardiner walked to put runners on the corner and Lauren Heil came in to pinch run. A failed double steal found Paculba picked off at third while stood Heil at second. Enea popped out to end the inning and the Gators’ threat.

=== UNLV (Cathedral City Classic) ===
	1	2	3	4	5	6	7	R	H	E
Gators	0	0	3	0	0	0	2	5	8	1
Rebels	0	0	0	0	0	1	0	1	4	1

The first runs of the game came in the top of the third when Michelle Moultrie earned her first career hit, nailing one to deep right field. The right fielder could not handle the hard-hit ball and Moultrie used her speed to hustle home for an inside-the-park home run. Aja Paculba followed with a base hit through the left side and Kim Waleszonia bunted her way onto first. Paculba moved to third on an error by the Rebel third baseman and Waleszonia stole third to put two Gators in scoring position. Ali Gardiner was walked to load the bases and Francesca Enea was hit to force in Florida's second run. Corrie Brooks drew a walk to give Florida a 3–0 lead. Stacey Nelson relieved Stephanie Brombacher in the fifth. With a runner on third in the sixth because of a hit by pitch, a groundout, and a wild pitch, Jaci Hull smacked one to deep center field to get the Rebels there only run of the game. The Gators would add some insurance, however, in the top of the seventh. Paculba singled up the middle and was moved to second on a sacrifice bunt from Waleszonia. Gardiner walked, and Enea singled to score Paculba and move Gardiner to third. After Corrie Brooks was walked and a new pitcher was brought into the game, an illegal pitch moved all runners up and scored Gardiner. A double play would end the inning.

=== Michigan ===
	1	2	3	4	5	6	7	R	H	E
Wolverines	0	0	0	0	0	0	0	0	3	0
Gators	2	2	0	0	0	0	X	4	7	0

The Gators had few problems against starting pitcher Nikki Nemitz, tallying 5 hits and a walk through 9 at-bats. In the bottom of the first, second baseman Aja Paculba had a lead-off single to right field. After Kim Waleszonia struck out, first baseman Ali Gardiner was walked to move Paculba into scoring position. Clean-up hitter Francesca Enea then hit a blooper to shallow right that barely hit the ground around the outstretched glove of Michigan right fielder Angela Findlay. Gardiner, who had to remain close to her bag in case the ball was caught, was easily forced out at second. Enea then successfully stole second, her first stolen base of the year, causing some confusion as she jogged to second on whether it was a dead ball. Designated played Tiffany DeFelice scored both runners when she hit a single barely over the leaping shortstop's glove. Right fielder Kelsey Bruder ended the inning on a strike out. The bottom third of the Gators' lineup tallied two more hits against Nemitz in the bottom of second causing Michigan to send in Sophomore right-hander Jordan Taylor. With the exception of a 2 RBI single from Waleszonia to score hitters 7 and 9 (Corrie Brooks and Kristina Hilberth) and a double from Bruder in the fifth, Taylor held the Gators' offense in check.

Michigan threatened to break-up the shutout in the top of the sixth when shortstop Teddi Ewing was tagged out at the plate. She reached on a fielder's choice, moved to second on a groundout to second base, and attempted to come around on a single from Molly Bausher. However, as Ewing rounded third base, an alert Bruder sent a perfect throw to Hilberth who was easily waiting at home for her to apply the tag.

=== Pacific (Cox Invitational) ===
	1	2	3	4	5	6	7	R	H	E
Gators	0	1	3	1	1	4	0	10	15	0
Tigers	0	0	0	5	0	0	0	5	6	1

In their opening game of the Cox Invitational, Florida uncharacteristically allowed five earned runs, but still managed to get the win. Corrie Brooks started off the scoring slowly with a solo shot in the top of the second inning. Three more came in the third off the bat of Kelsey Bruder, who homered to left, bringing home Francesca Enea and Tiffany DeFelice, who both singled. They'd add one more an inning later after Kim Waleszonia was hit by a pitch with one out. Waleszonia stole second and Enea got the RBI on a single to left.

Pacific scored all five of their runs in the next half-inning. Paige Emerson reached base on a bunt single, Nicole Matson singled, and Amanda Collier walked to load the bases. A single from Briana Santos moved everyone forward 60 feet, and Stephanie Brombacher allowed her first run of the year. Three more singles would tie the game at five, but not for long.

Megan Bush lead of the fifth with a solo homer that would put the Gators on top for good. In the top of the sixth, Ali Gardiner doubled to left center to start off the inning. With pinch runner Ami Austin on third and Enea on second after a single and the throw to third, DeFelice grounded to short to score Austin. Then, Bruder walked, and Brooks hit an RBI single, chasing Tiger pitcher Chelsea Engle from the game. The new pitcher allowed a sacrifice fly, a single, a walk, and threw a wild pitch before Michelle Moultrie was caught stealing to end the inning. Although the Gators threatened in the top of the seventh, the score would stand at 10–5.

=== South Florida (Cox Invitational - Game 1) ===
	1	2	3	4	5	6	7	R	H	E
Bulls	0	0	0	0	0	0	0	0	2	0
Gators	4	2	0	2	0	1	X	8	14	0

=== Illinois (Cox Invitational - Game 1) ===
	1	2	3	4	5	6	7	R	H	E
Gators	1	2	2	0	0	4	-	9	12	1
Fighting Illini	0	0	0	1	0	0	-	1	5	2

=== Texas Tech (Cox Invitational) ===
	1	2	3	4	5	6	7	R	H	E
Red Raiders	0	0	2	0	1	0	0	3	7	1
Gators	3	0	2	0	0	2	X	7	8	1

=== Illinois (Cox Invitational - Game 2) ===
	1	2	3	4	5	6	7	R	H	E
Fighting Illini	1	0	1	0	0	0	-	2	3	1
Gators	2	0	2	3	0	X	-	7	7	1

=== South Florida (Cox Invitational - Game 2) ===
	1	2	3	4	5	6	7	R	H	E
Gators	0	4	2	3	0	-	-	9	11	2
Bulls	1	0	0	0	0	-	-	1	3	2

=== South Carolina (Game 1) ===
	1	2	3	4	5	6	7	8	R	H	E
Gators	0	0	1	0	1	0	0	2	4	9	1
Gamecocks	0	0	0	0	2	0	0	0	2	6	1

=== South Carolina (Game 2) ===
	1	2	3	4	5	6	7	R	H	E
Gators	1	0	0	2	0	0	0	3	9	1
Gamecocks	0	0	0	0	0	0	1	1	4	0

=== South Carolina (Game 3) ===
	1	2	3	4	5	6	7	R	H	E
Gators	1	4	0	0	1	0	0	6	8	0
Gamecocks	0	0	0	0	0	0	0	0	5	2

=== Georgia (Game 1) ===
	1	2	3	4	5	6	7	R	H	E
Bulldogs	0	0	0	0	0	-	-	0	1	1
Gators	7	4	3	1	X	-	-	15	10	0

=== Georgia (Game 2) ===
	1	2	3	4	5	6	7	R	H	E
Bulldogs	0	0	0	0	0	0	0	0	1	1
Gators	1	1	0	2	0	0	X	4	7	0

=== Ole Miss (Game 1) ===
	1	2	3	4	5	6	7	R	H	E
Gators	0	0	0	0	0	1	1	2	5	1
Rebels	0	0	0	0	0	0	0	0	5	2

=== Ole Miss (Game 2) ===
	1	2	3	4	5	6	7	R	H	E
Gators	0	0	5	0	0	2	5	12	9	0
Rebels	0	0	0	0	0	0	0	0	4	4

=== Ole Miss (Game 3) ===
	1	2	3	4	5	6	7	R	H	E
Gators	1	0	0	3	0	0	0	4	8	0
Rebels	0	0	0	0	0	0	0	0	0	0

=== Florida International (Game 1) ===
	1	2	3	4	5	6	7	R	H	E
Panthers	0	0	0	2	0	0	0	2	7	2
Gators	0	3	0	0	0	0	X	3	4	2

=== Florida International (Game 2) ===
	1	2	3	4	5	6	7	R	H	E
Panthers	0	0	0	0	0	0	0	0	4	1
Gators	1	1	2	0	1	0	X	5	11	0

=== Tennessee (Game 1) ===
	1	2	3	4	5	6	7	R	H	E
Volunteers	0	0	0	0	0	0	0	0	4	0
Gators	0	0	5	1	1	0	X	7	7	0

=== Tennessee (Game 2) ===
	1	2	3	4	5	6	7	R	H	E
Volunteers	0	0	0	0	0	0	0	0	2	1
Gators	0	1	1	2	0	3	X	7	11	1

=== Tennessee (Game 3) ===
	1	2	3	4	5	6	7	R	H	E
Volunteers	0	0	1	0	0	0	0	1	4	1
Gators	0	0	0	1	3	0	X	4	9	0

=== Alabama (Game 1) ===
	1	2	3	4	5	6	7	R	H	E
Crimson Tide	0	0	0	0	1	0	-	1	4	0
Gators	0	0	0	0	3	6	-	9	12	0

In a surprising mercy-rule-ended game, Florida scored nine earned runs and hit 12 times off Alabama's Kelsi Dunne. However, it was the Crimson Tide who scored first. In the top of the fifth, Alabama loaded the bases with no outs on two walks and a single. A hit by pitch brought in the first run of the game and left the bases loaded. A fielder's choice grounder to third baseman Corrie Brooks allowed Ashley Holcombe to reach, but forced the runner out at home. Catcher Kristina Hilberth then picked off the runner at third for the second out. Stacey Nelson struck out Brittany Rogers to keep the scoring at one run.

The Gators would not stay behind for long, as Aja Paculba doubled, Kelsey Bruder walked, and Ali Gardiner singled all with one out to load the bases. With two outs and the bases still loaded, Brooks hit a single to the shortstop that scored two and put Florida on top. Megan Bush singled through the right side to score Gardiner, and Hilberth walked to load the bases again, but a harmless fly to right left them that way.

While the Tide tried to counter, loading the bases with one out, a force out at home and a fly out back to Nelson kept Alabama from scoring. In the bottom of the sixth, Alicia Sisco hit a lead-off single to the left side, but her pinch runner was caught stealing. Paculba then singled, and Bruder flied out. As the Gators had all season, they rallied with two outs, starting with a walk to Gardiner. Francesca Enea homered for three more runs, and Brooks made it 7–1 with another home run. Then, Bush and Hilberth singled and Tiffany DeFelice walked to load the bases. Pinch hitter Shaunice Harris walked to bring in pinch runner Lauren Heil, and Paculba ended the game early on an RBI single to left field.

=== Alabama (Game 2) ===
	1	2	3	4	5	6	7	R	H	E
Crimson Tide	1	0	0	0	0	-	-	1	3	1
Gators	1	1	8	0	X	-	-	10	8	0

Alabama scored first again in game two, but again got run-ruled, this time in five innings. Stephanie Brombacher walked Brittany Rogers to lead off the game, but was caught stealing by Kristina Hilberth. Kelley Montalvo followed with a triple, and Charlotte Morgan got the RBI on a sacrifice fly to center field. In the bottom of the first, Aja Paculba led off with a solo home run to tie the game. The Gators took the lead in the bottom of the second with another solo shot, this time from Megan Bush.

The third inning, however, was when Florida took control of the game. Alicia Sisco and Paculba consecutively singled to put two runners on with no one out. A Kelsey Bruder home run scored three more, giving Florida a 5–1 lead. With one out, three straight Gators walked before Michelle Moultrie hit a single that scored two and moved the remaining runner to third. Moultrie then stole second, and Hilberth scored from third on an error by the catcher. Sisco, batting for the second time in the inning, doubled to score Moultrie. After Morgan walked Paculba, the Tide replaced her in the circle with Amanda Locke. Locke gave up a single to Bruder that allowed Sisco to score, but then got Gardiner to fly out to finally end the third inning. Neither team scored in the remaining inning and a half, ending the game 10–1 in favor of the Gators after 4½ innings.

=== Alabama (Game 3) ===
	1	2	3	4	5	6	7	R	H	E
Crimson Tide	0	0	0	1	3	1	1	6	8	1
Gators	1	0	0	0	0	0	3	4	6	2

For the first time in the series, Florida scored first, but for the third time in the series, the team that scored second won. In the bottom of the first with one out, Kelsey Bruder singled and stole second, and Ali Gardiner walked. With two on and two out, Corrie Brooks singled up the middle to score Bruder. Alabama didn't make up that run until the top of the fourth. With one out, Ashley Holcombe singled through the right side and Kellie Eubanks walked. After an outless fielder's choice loaded the bases, Brittany Rogers hit a fielder's choice that scored the runner from third and forced out the runner from second. A strike out ended the threat, but Alabama would score three more in the following inning. Alabama again loaded the bases, this time with no outs, before Whitney Larsen struck out and Holcombe reached on a fielding error by Brooks that allowed the Tide to score again. Eubanks struck out looking for the second out, but a 2 RBI single from Jazlyn Lunceford gave Alabama a 4–1 lead.

Stephanie Brombacher relieved Stacey Nelson in the top of the sixth, but she couldn't keep Alabama off the scoreboard either. She hit the first batter she faced with a pitch and allowed her to advance to second on an illegal pitch. Morgan and Cassie Reilly-Boccia each followed up with strike outs, but the runner scored on Lauren Parker's RBI single. The Crimson Tide scored once more to make it a 6–1 game in the top of the seventh on a one-out triple from Lunceford and a double from Rogers.

Florida did not give up in the bottom of the seventh, beginning their rally with a walk for Aja Paculba. Bruder doubled to put them both in scoring position, and with one out, Francesca Enea hit a 3-run homer to left center, shrinking Alabama's lead to two. After Brooks and Bush consecutively walked, Hilberth struck out, and Michelle Moultrie hit a fly to deep right that was about five feet from going out of the park.

=== Auburn (Game 1) ===
	1	2	3	4	5	6	7	R	H	E
Gators	0	0	2	0	0	0	1	3	5	1
Tigers	0	0	0	0	0	0	0	0	2	1

Florida's offense sputtered against Auburn pitcher Anna Thompson; all three RBI came on two home runs. In the top of the third, Kelsey Bruder hit a two-out single down the right field line. Ali Gardiner then took her first pitch over the left field wall to give Florida a 2–0 lead. The Gators had two hits in the final four innings combined, but the hit from pinch hitter Michelle Moultrie in the top of the seventh was a solo homer to right center. Stacey Nelson got the win for the Gators, throwing a compact 72-pitch, two-hit shutout while striking out nine and walking none. Conversely, Thompson gave up three earned runs on five hits and four walks and struck out four on 134 pitches.

=== Auburn (Game 2) ===
	1	2	3	4	5	6	7	R	H	E
Gators	0	0	0	1	4	2	0	7	8	0
Tigers	0	0	0	1	0	0	0	1	3	3

Although Auburn committed three errors, none of them led to the Gators' seven runs as Florida had eight hits and drew three walks. After three straight innings of trading zeros, Florida and Auburn traded ones instead. In the top of the inning, Corrie Brooks hit a two-out double to right field and came home when Megan Bush repeated the feat to center. Auburn responded immediately when their lead off batter hit a homer off Stephanie Brombacher. Brombacher then allowed a single and a walk, making way for Stacey Nelson to replace her in the circle. After a sacrifice bunt moved both runners over, Nelson struck out the next to batters, ending the threat.

In the fifth, Florida countered with four more runs. Aja Paculba started things off with a one-out single through the left side, then stole second, and advanced to third on a throwing error by the catcher. Tiffany DeFelice and Ali Gardiner both walked, loading the bases for Francesca Enea, who hit a grand slam home run to left center. The following inning, pinch hitter Michelle Moultrie doubled with two outs and stole third. Paculba walked and stole second before DeFelice hit a single down the left field line to score both runners. Nelson got the win for Florida, while Jenee Loree took the loss for Auburn.

=== Mississippi State (Game 1) ===
	1	2	3	4	5	6	7	R	H	E
Bulldogs	0	0	0	0	0	-	-	2	5	1
Gators	1	8	2	0	X	-	-	11	13	1

Florida dominated Mississippi State in this five-inning contest. Although they scored only once on an RBI single from Kelsey Bruder in the first inning, the Gators ran away with the game in the second. The inning saw eight Gator runs score on five hits, including a single and 3-run homer from shortstop Megan Bush, and a Bulldog error. In the third, first baseman Ali Gardiner pushed the lead to 11 when she sent her 0-1 pitch to left center, scoring Aja Paculba and pinch runner Ami Austin, who were both on base because of singles.

Senior pitcher Stacey Nelson let up on the Bulldogs in the top of the fourth, allowing four hits and two runs, reducing the Gators' lead to nine. Mississippi State managed their only back-to-back hits in the half-inning, scoring on an RBI single from Sammie Jo Bailey and a wild pitch from Nelson. Nelson struck out 10 batters in her five innings pitched.

=== Mississippi State (Game 2) ===
	1	2	3	4	5	6	7	R	H	E
Bulldogs	0	0	2	0	0	0	0	2	3	0
Gators	0	1	0	0	0	0	5	6	7	2

In sharp contrast to game one, the second game against Mississippi State ended with a walk-off grand slam from sophomore right fielder Kelsey Bruder. Florida managed to score a single run in the bottom of the second when third baseman Corrie Brooks hit an RBI double to score Francesca Enea, who was on base because of a walk. Unfortunately for the Gators, their bats would go silent for the next four innings thanks to a dominating performance by Bulldogs pitcher Lindsay Dunlap. The Bulldogs, however, would score twice in the top of the third to take their only lead of the series. Starter Stephanie Brombacher walked the leadoff batter, then committed an error that allowed batter Chelsea Bramlett to reach and the other runner to advanced all the way to third. With runners on the corners, Bramlett attempted to steal second, and was caught in a pickle that resulted in an error on shortstop Megan Bush and an unearned run for the Bulldogs. Bramlett advanced to third on a groundout and scored on a single from Ka'ili Smith.

The two teams traded zeros in the fourth, fifth, and sixth innings, Florida trailing 1–2. The Gators wouldn't quietly take a defeat though. With one out, Kristina Hilberth and Paculba hit back-to-back singles to put the tying run in scoring position. Designated player Tiffany DeFelice grounded into what was almost a double play, if not for a great slide from Paculba, tripping the Bulldogs shortstop and allowing DeFelice to reach. With the tying run now 60 feet from home and two outs, Ali Gardiner hit an RBI single to center, and both runners moved up on the throw to home. Mississippi State elected to intentionally walk clean-up hitter Francesca Enea to get a more favorable left-on-left matchup with Bruder, who then hit a bases-loaded, bottom-of-the-seventh, full-count grand slam to right field to end the game with a Florida victory.

=== Mississippi State (Game 3) ===
	1	2	3	4	5	6	7	R	H	E
Bulldogs	0	0	0	0	0	0	0	0	3	0
Gators	0	3	0	0	0	0	X	3	5	0

The three runs scored by Florida in the bottom of the second inning were all they needed to secure the win. Stacey Nelson pitched a seven-inning, three-hit shutout while striking out seven and walking none.

The Gators' only runs all came with two outs: the first a solo shot from Corrie Brooks, and the final two on a triple down the right field line from Michelle Moultrie that scored Megan Bush (walked on five pitches) and Kristina Hilberth (singled to left).

=== Florida State ===
	1	2	3	4	5	6	7	8	9	R	H	E
Seminoles	0	0	0	0	0	2	1	0	0	3	8	1
Gators	1	0	1	0	0	0	1	0	1	4	6	0

The Gators scored twice early in the game, both in quite unconventional ways. In the bottom of the first, sophomore Aja Paculba led off with a single up the middle and stole second. She moved to third on an Ali Gardiner ground out and scored on a wild pitch. In the third, with one out, freshman Michelle Moultrie laid down a bunt single to get on base. After a quick fly out, Moultrie attempted to steal second, and due to confusion on the call, began walking back to the dugout behind third base. After she was already several steps off the bag, she was judged safe by the umpire and took off for third. Florida State second baseman Kristie McConn attempted to throw her out, but the ball sailed far right of the third baseman. Moultrie scored on the throwing error.

Florida's starting pitcher Stephanie Brombacher, who had pitched five scoreless innings to that point, allowed a 2-run homer to Kaleigh Rafter in the top of the sixth that tied the game. In the top of the seventh, Brombacher gave up a solo home run to Michelle Snyder. With two quick outs in the home half of seventh and Florida down by one, sophomore Megan Bush stepped into the batter's box and nailed the scoreboard in left center with her 2-2 pitch, sending the game into extra innings.

With one down in the top of the eighth, Stacey Nelson came in to relieve Brombacher. After the Gators and Seminoles traded zeros in the eighth, Nelson allowed a hit to leadoff batter Jessica Gilmore in the ninth, but Florida State couldn't manufacture anything else. Then, in the bottom of the inning, Florida's leadoff batter, Francesca Enea, ended the game in walk-off fashion with her 12th homer of the year.

=== Kentucky (Game 1) ===
	1	2	3	4	5	6	7	8	9	R	H	E
Gators	0	0	0	0	0	0	0	0	1	1	1	2
Wildcats	0	0	0	0	0	0	0	0	0	0	5	1

In game one against the Wildcats, the potent Florida offense managed only one hit against freshman Rachel Riley, but that was all they needed. In the top of the ninth, with a runner on and nobody out, Ali Gardiner broke up the no-hitter with a single through the left side. A Francesca Enea groundout moved both runners over, and a sacrifice fly from Kelsey Bruder scored Florida's only run of the game.

Stacey Nelson bailed out her offense, holding Kentucky scoreless for the entire nine-inning affair. The Wildcats, however, did threaten. In the second, they had the bases loaded with one out, but Nelson caught left fielder Annie Rowlands looking and forced right fielder Destinee Mordecai to ground out. They had a runner on third with one out again in the fourth, but Nelson recovered with 2 of her 12 strikeouts on the day. All together, the Wildcats left nine runners on base and six of them in scoring position.

=== Kentucky (Game 2) ===
	1	2	3	4	5	6	7	R	H	E
Gators	2	1	0	0	1	2	0	6	9	0
Wildcats	0	0	0	0	0	0	0	0	3	1

Florida offense didn't wait nine innings to plate a run in game two; in the top of the first, left fielder Francesca Enea tied the school record for career home runs with a two-run bomb to left field. She would break the record in the fifth with a solo shot to center. In the second, shortstop Megan Bush singled and moved over to second on a Kristina Hilberth sacrifice bunt. Second baseman Aja Paculba scored Bush on an RBI double to right field. Up 4–0 in the sixth, Florida added to its lead on a costly error by Kentucky right fielder Destinee Mordecai. With catcher Kristina Hilberth on first, nine-hole hitter Michelle Moultrie singled to right. Mordecai misplayed the ball, allowing it to roll all the way to the fence and Hilberth and the speedy Moultrie to score.

Stephanie Brombacher seemed back to her dominant self after a bout of the flu, striking out a career-high-tying 12 batters and walking none in seven innings.

=== Central Florida ===
	1	2	3	4	5	6	7	R	H	E
Golden Knights	0	0	0	0	0	0	0	0	3	0
Gators	0	0	2	0	0	1	X	3	5	2

In a game that coach Tim Walton used to preview next year's squad, Florida managed three runs on five hits and shutout their opponent for the 25th time this season. The third inning was eerily similar in the top and bottom: both pitchers seemed to have trouble with their control as Florida's Stephanie Brombacher and UCF's Magon Paul both hit two consecutive batters. The Knights were unable to capitalize as Brombacher forced two groundouts, but the Gators scored twice. After Michelle Moultrie and Alicia Sisco were both hit, Aja Paculba reached on a fielder's choice that allowed Moultrie to move to third. Moultrie and Paculba both moved forward a base on a passed ball, giving Florida their first run of the game. Paculba would score from second on a single to center from Francesca Enea.

In the bottom of the sixth, with runners on first and second with one out, Moultrie hit a grounder to Central Florida's shortstop. As she was fielding the ball, she and pinch runner Le-Net Franklin collided, but the third base umpire made no call. After a quick flip to the third baseman, Franklin was called out, which infuriated Walton. He was ejected after a lengthy argument that included him throwing his hat to the ground. Sisco, the next Gator batter, fed off this energy, singling to score pinch runner Lauren Heil from second.

Brombacher pitched seven scoreless innings, only allowing three hits, walking none, and striking out ten.

=== LSU (Game 1) ===
	1	2	3	4	5	6	7	R	H	E
Gators	2	0	0	1	0	0	0	3	4	0
Tigers	0	0	0	0	0	0	0	0	5	0

CLINCHED SEC REGULAR SEASON TITLE

Before this series, Tim Walton had never won in Baton Rouge. That all changed with another shutout from Stacey Nelson and a first-inning 2-run homer from Francesca Enea. With two outs in the top of the first, Ali Gardiner singled immediately before Enea hit her 15th home run of the season. Even though the Gator bats were relatively quite, they did manage to push another run across the plate in the fourth. Corrie Brooks walked to lead off the inning and was pushed to second on a sacrifice bunt from Megan Bush. Kristina Hilberth slapped a single to advance Brooks to third, making it to second on the throw home. Michelle Moultrie then hit a deep fly ball to right, scoring Brooks on a sacrifice fly. Hilberth was stranded on third when Aja Paculba flied out to left.

Although they outhit Florida 5–4, LSU was never able to get anything against the Gator's ace. Their best shot at a score came in the bottom of the seventh when a single, a groundout, a popup, and a second single gave LSU runners on the corners with two outs. Unfortunately for the Tigers, third baseman Jessica Mouse fouled out to her counterpart to end the game. Nelson pitched seven innings, allowed five hits, walked one, and struck out six.

=== LSU (Game 2) ===
	1	2	3	4	5	6	7	R	H	E
Gators	0	0	0	1	0	0	0	1	5	0
Tigers	0	0	0	0	0	0	0	0	2	0

Although the Gators left nine runners on base in game two against the Tigers, they did manage to score once, in the top of the fourth and prevented LSU from scoring for the second straight game. The one score came off Kelsey Bruder's lead off single. With one out, Megan Bush's sacrifice bunt moved Bruder to second. Kristina Hilberth followed up with a bouncing single up the middle to score her. Even though Hilberth moved to second on the throw home and to third on a passed ball, a Michelle Moultrie fly out left her stranded at bag.

Stephanie Brombacher throw six innings before being relieved by Stacey Nelson, who earned the save. Brombacher allowed only two hits, but walked three and only struck out four. Nelson struck out two of the three batters she faced.

=== LSU (Game 3) ===
	1	2	3	4	5	6	7	R	H	E
Gators	2	4	0	6	0	-	-	12	12	0
Tigers	0	0	0	0	0	-	-	0	5	2

The Gators broke out of their hitting slump in a game that swept LSU in Baton Rouge for the first time in school history. In the top of the first, Aja Paculba, who had gone 0-for-8 in the previous two games against the Tigers, led off with a single. After Paculba stole second (tying the single season stolen base record with 24), catcher Kristina Hilberth attempted to move her to third, but popped her bunt up to the third baseman. Paculba would make it to third, however, on her way home when Ali Gardiner hit a home run to left, putting the Gators up 2–0. In the bottom of the inning, LSU would threaten, getting the bases loaded, but with two outs already on the board they couldn't capitalize. Stacey Nelson forced first baseman Anissa Young to slap one back to her to keep the Tigers off the board. In the second, the Gators would lead off with another single, this time from shortstop Megan Bush. After an out from Alicia Sisco, Michelle Moultrie singled as well, moving Bush to second. Both runners would score on an error bye the Tiger shortstop, who allowed Hilberth's grounder to roll through her legs. Gardiner then hit her second home run of the game, bringing the Florida lead to six.

The Gators would score six more, all unearned, in the fourth. With one out, Paculba singled to left and Hilberth would reach again on a fielding error, this time by the pitcher. After Gardiner flew out to left, Francesca Enea hit an RBI single up the middle and advanced to second on the throw home. Kelsey Bruder cleared the bases with a homer that barely snuck over the right field wall. The final two runs of the game would come when Bush hit the fourth home run of the game to score herself and Corrie Brooks, who singled.

Nelson pitched five more scoreless innings, walked only one, allowed five hits, and struck out seven.

=== Arkansas (Game 1) ===
	1	2	3	4	5	6	7	R	H	E
Razorbacks	0	0	0	0	0	-	-	0	2	2
Gators	2	5	2	2	X	-	-	11	10	0

Florida got on the board in the bottom of the first when Francesca Enea hit a line-drive homer to center that also scored Aja Paculba, who walked. In the second, the Gators loaded the bases with a single from Alicia Sisco, another Paculba walk, and a single from Kristina Hilberth. Ali Gardiner scored Sisco and Paculba on a single to center, but Razorback pitcher Layne McGuirt reloaded the bases when she walked Enea. Bruder was walked to bring in Hilberth and Corrie Brooks scored Gardiner when the shortstop mishandled her grounder. Michelle Moultrie's groundout to short brought in Bruder and increased the Florida lead to seven. Former starter Kim Waleszonia, who missed 30 games due to a knee injury she sustained in the Cox Communications Invitational against Texas Tech, then replaced Sisco in the designated player spot. She flew out to the right fielder, who was standing on the warning track when she made the catch, to end the inning.

Florida scored twice in both the third and fourth innings. Paculba led off the third with a single and was moved to third by a double from Hilberth. With two outs, Bruder scored them both on a stand-up double to right center. In the fourth, Megan Bush drew a lead-off walk and pinch hitter Tiffany DeFelice doubled. Waleszonia sent them both home on a single up the middle.

Stacey Nelson got the start and pitched three innings, allowing two hits and striking out three. Stephanie Brombacher came into the game in the top of the fourth, pitched two innings of hitless relief, and struck out two.

=== Arkansas (Game 2) ===
	1	2	3	4	5	6	7	R	H	E
Razorbacks	0	0	0	0	0	-	-	0	2	2
Gators	2	6	3	0	X	-	-	11	12	0

Florida broke the single season home run record with Kelsey Bruder's grand slam in the second and tied the school record for shutouts in a single season with their 30th. Stacey Nelson pitched the first four innings of game two, allowed only one hit, and struck out five. Stephanie Brombacher allowed one hit as well in her single inning of work and finished with one 'K'.

Offensively, the Gators were very impressive, going 12-for-24 as a team, walked twice, and not one batter struck out. In the bottom of the first, Aja Paculba, Francesca Enea, and Kelsey Bruder all singled with Paculba and Enea scoring runs. Corrie Brooks laced a single of her own at the beginning of the next frame. After Alicia Sisco was hit by a pitch, Brooks would score on a Paculba double. Kristina Hilberth walked to load the bases before Ali Gardiner singled to score Sisco and keep the bases full. That's when Bruder nailed her 12th home run of the season to stretch the lead to eight. Florida scored their final three runs in the third inning on a homer from Gardiner.

=== Arkansas (Game 3) ===
	1	2	3	4	5	6	7	R	H	E
Razorbacks	0	0	0	0	0	0	0	0	0	1
Gators	1	0	2	1	1	1	X	6	11	0

In Florida's ninth straight shutout, senior Stacey Nelson pitched her second career no-hitter and Aja Paculba broke the single-season stolen base record with 25. Nelson also struck out eight, which brought her total career strikeout total to 1,007, and walked one. The only number the Razorbacks managed to get on the board was an error in the first when their left fielder ran past an Ali Gardiner single, allowing Paculba to score. The Gators scored again in the third on a two-run home run from Kelsey Bruder and in the fourth on a single that drove in pinch-runner Michelle Moultrie, who stole second after Kim Waleszonia was walked. An inning later, Bruder was walked with one out and moved to second on a single from Megan Bush. Moultrie hit a single of her own to bring home Bruder. The Gators scored their final run in the sixth; Paculba led off with another single and advanced to second on a passed ball. Gardiner moved her to third with a base hit, and Francesca Enea got the RBI on a groundout to short.

=== Longwood (Game 1) ===
	1	2	3	4	5	6	7	R	H	E
Lancers	0	0	0	0	0	-	-	0	1	0
Gators	1	0	2	1	1	1	X	6	11	0

Florida used two big offensive innings and a one-hitter from Stacey Nelson to beat Longwood in five innings on senior day. Nelson allowed her only hit of the game to the first batter she faced, but two strikeouts and a fly out left the runner stranded. In the bottom of that inning, with Kristina Hilberth on base with one out due to a walk, Ali Gardiner hit a single through the right side. Kelsey Bruder brought in the first run of the game on her own single, and both remaining runners moved into scoring position on the throw home. Corrie Brooks followed with a similar play that scored Gardiner from third and allowed her to take second. Kim Waleszonia sent both runners home on yet another single, and Le-Net Franklin cleared the bases with her first career home run.

In the bottom of the fourth, up 6–0 with two outs, the Gators loaded the bases with two singles and a walk. After Bruder walked to score a run and keep the bases full of Gators, Brooks drilled her eighth home run and fourth grand slam of the year. Up by 11, the game ended via mercy rule and gave Florida their 32nd shutout of the season.

=== Longwood (Game 2) ===
	1	2	3	4	5	6	7	R	H	E
Lancers	0	0	0	0	0	0	0	0	2	0
Gators	1	1	0	1	0	3	X	6	8	0

The Gators won game two against the Lancers using small ball and scattered scoring along with a two-hit pitching performance from Stephanie Brombacher. In the first, Aja Paculba led off with a walk and stole second. Kim Waleszonia moved her to third on a sacrifice bunt, and Francesca Enea scored her with a sacrifice fly to deep center, Enea's 11th career sac fly and a new school record. Megan Bush led off the following inning with a double to right center before Tiffany DeFelice sacrificed to move her to third. Alicia Sisco got the RBI on a groundout to second.

After a one-two-three third inning, Florida put two runners on with nobody out when Kelsey Bruder was hit by a pitch, and Corrie Brooks singled. Bush advanced them both with yet another Florida sacrifice bunt. Tiffany DeFelice scored Bruder on a groundout before Alicia Sisco struck out to end the inning. The sixth was the biggest offense inning for the Gators, who scored three and left three on-base. Enea walked to start off the inning and was replaced with pinch runner Brooke Johnson. After a Bruder strike out, Brooks and Bush consecutively singled to score Johnson, but Brooks was caught in a pickle between second and third for the second out. DeFelice hit her first and the Gators' 69th home run of the year to make it 6–0. Pinch hitter Ali Gardiner walked, Le-Net Franklin singled, and pinch hitter Kristina Hilberth singled to load the bases. However, Michelle Moultrie, who replaced Waleszonia on the bases paths an inning earlier, popped up to first to end the threat.

=== Longwood (Game 3) ===
	1	2	3	4	5	6	7	R	H	E
Lancers	0	0	1	0	0	0	0	1	4	1
Gators	0	0	2	0	0	1	X	3	11	2

The Gators squandered countless scoring opportunities in a 3-1 regular-season-ending win that saw 14 Florida runners stranded on base. Longwood ended a 74-inning stretch where Florida's pitching staff had not allowed a single run. The run came in the top of the third on a controversial play in which Stacey Nelson overthrew Aja Paculba, who was covering first. With a runner already on first via a single, the Lancer second baseman laid down a bunt, reached on Nelson's error, and both runners advanced two bases when the ball bounced all the way to the rolled-up tarp in right field. Kristina Hilberth picked off the pinch runner at third for the first out, and Nelson struck out the next two batters. Florida responded in the bottom of the inning with two runs. Francesca Enea led off with a four-pitch walk, Kelsey Bruder, who was nearly hit by a pitch in her first at bat, was pegged on the elbow, and Corrie Brooks doubled to bring in pinch runner Brooke Johnson and tie the game at 1-all. Hilberth put the Gators ahead for good with a game-winning RBI single up the middle.

Florida scored their final run in the bottom of the sixth on a Bruder solo home run to right. After both Ali Gardiner and Enea flew out to deep left and center fields, respectively, Bruder, who had been hit by a second pitch in her previous at-bat, gave the Gators their 70th home run of season. In the top of the final inning, Nelson hit Lancer pitcher Briana Wells before striking out her 10th and 11th batters and exiting the game to a standing ovation along with fellow seniors Gardiner and Hilberth.

=== Auburn (SEC Tournament) ===
	1	2	3	4	5	6	7	R	H	E
Tigers	0	0	0	0	0	0	0	0	2	0
Gators	2	0	1	0	0	0	X	3	4	1

In the first round of the SEC Tournament, Florida scored early and used good defense and pitching to close out Auburn. The Gators scored in the first when Francesca Enea doubled to deep left center, scoring Aja Paculba and Kristina Hilberth. Paculba lead off with a walk and advanced to second on a wild pitch. Hilberth's single did not advance her to third, but both moved up on another wild pitch. Paculba homered to start off the bottom of the third, and the Gators would hold on from there.

Stacey Nelson, the SEC Pitcher of the Year for the second straight year, threw seven scoreless innings allowing two hits, a walk, and struck out five. The closest the Tigers got to a run was in the top of the fourth when Auburn got two runners on with no outs. Florida got the force out at third and a groundout to the pitcher on the next two plays, and both runners were stranded on a pop up to shortstop Megan Bush who ended the threat with an off-balance catch.

=== Tennessee (SEC Tournament) ===
	1	2	3	4	5	6	7	R	H	E
Volunteers	3	0	0	0	0	-	-	3	4	0
Gators	4	4	1	1	1	-	-	11	12	2

Florida started badly when Megan Bush committed an error on a hard-hit grounder, allowing the runner to reach. Then, with two outs, starting pitcher Stephanie Brombacher walked clean-up hitter Jessica Spigner. The next batter scored Tennessee's first run on a single, which also moved the other runner to third. After a double from right fielder Erin Webb scored both runners and a walk, Brombacher forced a pop-up to Bush for the third out. With Tennessee leading 3–0, the Gator offense put Florida back on top. Aja Paculba led off with a double to left center, and after a groundout from Kristina Hilberth moved Paculba to third, Ali Gardiner brought the Gators back to within one with a homer to left. With two outs, Kelsey Bruder was hit on the helmet with a pitch. Corrie Brooks brought her home with a triple, and Brooks gave Florida the lead with an RBI single from Bush.

Stacey Nelson relieved Brombacher in the second and managed out of a bases-loaded jam in which she walked three Volunteer batters. In the bottom of the second, Tennessee brought in a new pitcher of their own in the bottom of the inning, but it made no difference. With two outs, Gardiner walked and Francesca Enea hit her 17th home run of the season, tying her own Florida single season home run record and breaking the single season RBI record she set in the previous season. The Gators followed up Enea's homer with two more from Bruder and Brooks. With Nelson in the circle keeping Tennessee scoreless for the remainder of the game, Florida scored a run in each of the final innings, ending with an 11–3 mercy rule victory. In the third, Tiffany DeFelice started off the inning with a single, and Michelle Moultrie moved her to second on a bunt single. A wild pitch advanced both runners, and Hilberth's groundout scored pinch runner Le-Net Franklin. Bruder walked with no outs in the fourth, moved to third on a wild pitch and a Brooks's single, and Franklin got the RBI on a groundout to the pitcher. Florida ended the game in walk-off fashion when Bruder hit a double that scored pinch runner Ami Austin, who was on second base after a Gardiner fielder's choice and an Enea walk, from second.

=== Alabama (SEC Tournament) ===
	1	2	3	4	5	6	7	R	H	E
Crimson Tide	2	0	0	0	1	0	2	5	5	2
Gators	5	0	0	2	0	1	X	8	6	2

CLINCHED SEC TOURNAMENT TITLE

The Gators won their second straight SEC Tournament Title in a surprisingly high-scoring game with the Crimson Tide. Stacey Nelson and Alabama's Kelsi Dunne gave up a combined 10 earned runs and 11 hits, and both defenses committed uncommon errors, the first of which led off the game. Brittany Rodgers reached for the Tide on a throwing error by catcher Kristina Hilberth. Hilberth, however, would rectify the situation when she caught Rodgers stealing during the next at-bat. The Tide loaded the bases with one out when Nelson walked two and allowed a hit. Nelson hit Ashley Holcombe to give Alabama a run and a wild pitch allowed them to score a second time. The remaining two runners were stranded in scoring position when Nelson struck out SEC Freshman of the Year Amanda Locke and Whitney Larsen. In the bottom of the first inning, the Gators responded much like they did in their previous game against Tennessee. Aja Paculba reached first on a hit by pitch before Tiffany DeFelice's at-bat ended prematurely on a diving catch in foul territory from Alabama third baseman Kelley Montalvo. Ali Gardiner and Francesca Enea loaded the bases when they were walked and hit by a pitch, respectively. Kelsey Bruder walked to cut the lead to one, and Corrie Brooks reached on a fielder's choice that forced Gardiner out at the plate. With two outs and bases loaded, Megan Bush fought through a 15-pitch at-bat that ended in her second grand slam of the season and a 5-2 Gator lead.

The score remained unchanged until the bottom of the fourth when Florida increased their lead to five. Paculba tripled to start off the half-inning and scored on a suicide squeeze from DeFelice. With two outs, Enea was hit by a pitch for the third straight time. Pinch runner Brooke Johnson scored on the next play when Bruder doubled to left center. Alabama designated player Charlotte Morgan narrowed the margin to four in the top of the fifth with a solo home run, the first of the season given up by Nelson.

In Florida's last offensive inning, they scored one final insurance run on a Bruder RBI single with runners on first and second. In the top of the seventh, the Tide tried to mount a comeback, but fell short. Lauren Parker led off with a single, and Morgan reached base on an error by Bush. After both advanced on a wild pitch, Nelson walked Cassie Reilly-Boocia to load the bases with no outs. One run scored on each of two groundouts, narrowing the margin to three runs, but Nelson struck out Larsen to end the game with a Gator win.

=== Florida A&M (NCAA Gainesville Regional - Game 2) ===
	1	2	3	4	5	6	7	R	H	E
Rattlers	0	0	0	0	0	-	-	0	2	1
Gators	5	7	0	0	X	-	-	12	10	0

Florida sailed in their NCAA tournament opener against Florida A&M. Stephanie Brombacher threw a two-hit, five-inning shutout and the Gator offense hit three home runs. In the bottom of the first, Aja Paculba led off with a home run, Kristina Hilberth followed up with a high chopper up the middle, and Ali Gardiner walked. With one out, Kelsey Bruder hit an RBI double that moved Gardiner to third. A sacrifice fly from Corrie Brooks scored her but left Bruder at second. Megan Bush brought her home in the following at-bat with the Gators' second home run of the game, upping the Florida lead to five. The second inning was more of the same; with Paculba (walk), Hilberth (single), and Gardiner (walk) all on base, Florida's all-time RBI leader got two more with a single to center field. Brooks cleared the bases two batters later on a homer to left center, increasing the lead to 10. The final scores for Florida came on Paculba's two RBI single that brought home Bush, who was on third after a walk, and Kim Waleszonia, who was on second after a double.

=== Texas A&M (NCAA Gainesville Regional - Game 3) ===
	1	2	3	4	5	6	7	R	H	E
Aggies	0	0	0	0	1	0	0	1	9	1
Gators	1	1	0	0	2	3	X	7	11	0

The Gators won game two of the Gainesville Regional behind 14 strike outs from Stacey Nelson, stellar defense, and timing hitting. Florida scored single runs in each of the first two innings on a Kelsey Bruder two-out RBI single that scored Kristina Hilberth, who doubled, and an Aja Paculba two-out RBI single that scored Megan Bush, who doubled and moved to third on a sacrifice.

Texas A&M was aggressive on the base paths, leading to two pick-offs. In the top of the second, after Rhiannon Kliesing doubled and Bailey Scroeder struck out, Alex Reynolds singled to shallow left field. Kliesing tried to take third on the play, but Francesca Enea threw a strike to Corrie Brooks, who got the tag in plenty of time. In the top half of the third, Natalie Villareal led off with a single. Macie Morrow singled to right in the next at-bat, and Villareal went to third on the play; right fielder Kim Waleszonia threw the ball to third trying to get Villareal, but the throw was not in-time. Brooks quickly threw back to second, and Bush, who was covering, got the tag on Morrow. Texas A&M did score in the fifth on back-to-back doubles from Villareal and Morrow.

Florida immediately responded in the bottom of the inning. Paculba started things off with a single, and Hilberth reached on a fielder's choice in which they failed to get Paculba in time. Enea double with one out to score Paculba and move Hilberth to third. Bruder brought in Hilberth on a sacrifice fly to deep right field. Florida scored three more times in the bottom of the sixth thanks to missed assignments defensively by the Aggies. Tiffany DeFelice hit a one-out single, and Le-Net Franklin came in to pinch run for her. Michelle Moultrie laid down a bunt that spun around the batter's box, but never went foul. The Aggie first baseman came in to cover the bunt, and no one went to cover first, so when the catcher finally picked up the ball and threw there, it rolled into right field. Moultrie stayed on first until she realized that no one was covering second anymore, and Franklin went home from third because the right fielder inexplicably held onto the ball. Hilberth singled again and stole second, putting two runners in scoring position with two outs, and both were brought home on Ali Gardiner's first hit of the weekend in the Gator's next at-bat, a 2-RBI single that put Florida ahead by the final margin, 7–1.

=== Lehigh (NCAA Gainesville Regional - Game 6) ===
	1	2	3	4	5	6	7	R	H	E
Gators	0	0	0	2	0	4	3	9	11	1
Mountain Hawks	0	0	0	0	0	0	0	0	3	0

In their regional championship game, the Gators turned yet another close game into a rout. Florida got one base runner through the first three innings (a Megan Bush walk in the third) before they made the adjustments against Lehigh pitcher Lisa Sweeney. Kristina Hilberth led off the top of the fourth with a double to left center and moved to third on Ali Gardiner's groundout to second. Francesca Enea scored Hilberth on a double to center field and Kelsey Bruder scored Enea with an RBI single to right field. In the sixth inning, the Gators put the game out of reach. With Aja Paculba on base due to a walk from Sweeney, Hilberth singled, and Gardiner grounded into a fielder's choice that moved Paculba to third. Enea walked to load the bases for Bruder, who singled, scoring Paculba and pinch runner Lauren Heil. After pinch runner Brooke Johnson was thrown out trying to steal, Corrie Brooks hit a two-run homer to clear the bases. The seventh saw lead-off pinch hitter Alicia Sisco start things off with a double to left center and advance to third on pinch hitter Kim Waleszonia's groundout to second. Paculba then hit a single to score Sisco. With two outs, Gardiner and Enea singled, loading the bases yet again for Bruder, who doubled, scoring Paculba and Gardiner. Senior pitcher Stacey Nelson pitched seven scoreless innings for her 19th shutout of the year. She also only allowed three hits, struck out seven, and walked none in a tidy, 72-pitch performance.

=== California (NCAA Gainesville Super Regional - Game 1) ===
	1	2	3	4	5	6	7	R	H	E
Golden Bears	0	0	0	0	0	0	0	0	4	0
Gators	1	1	0	0	0	0	0	2	3	0

Florida scored one run in each of the first two innings, which turned out to be all they needed as Stacey Nelson allowed three hits and struck out 13 batters. In the bottom of the first, Aja Paculba led off with a solo homer after fouling off several pitches. The Gators' other run came in the bottom of the second, beginning with a single from Megan Bush. Bush moved to second and then third on two sacrifice bunts from Tiffany DeFelice and Kim Waleszonia. She came home on a wild pitch from California pitcher Marissa Drewery.

=== California (NCAA Gainesville Super Regional - Game 2) ===
	1	2	3	4	5	6	7	R	H	E
Gators	0	0	2	0	0	0	0	2	4	1
Golden Bears	1	0	0	0	0	0	0	1	4	0

CLINCHED BERTH IN WOMEN'S COLLEGE WORLD SERIES

After allowing the Bears to score (unearned) in the bottom of the first inning, Florida scored two runs in the third to take the lead, 2–1. Stephanie Brombacher walked the leadoff batter, who was thrown out on Shannon Thomas's fielder's choice. Thomas stole second, then moved to third on a ground out. An error from shortstop Megan Bush allowed Samoe Kekahuma to get on base and Thomas to get home. Stacey Nelson came into the game in the third and shut down the Bears' offense, allowing 3 base runners the rest of the way.

The two runs for Florida came in the top of the third. Bush and Tiffany DeFelice got on base via a hit by pitch and a walk. Kim Waleszonia moved both runners into scoring position on a sacrifice bunt, and Aja Paculba got the two RBIs on a double to left center. Although Kristina Hilberth followed Paculba with a single, a ground out and a strike out left them both on base.

=== Arizona (Women's College World Series - Game 4) ===
	1	2	3	4	5	6	7	R	H	E
Wildcats	0	0	0	0	0	0	0	0	2	0
Gators	2	1	0	0	0	0	0	3	5	0

In Florida's opening game in the 2009 Women's College World Series, Francesca Enea and Megan Bush hit homers to give Stacey Nelson her 40th win of the season. After Nelson gave up two hits to start the game, the Wildcats could not manage another one against her. Only three more Wildcats got on base for the rest of the game, all via walk, but 12 strike outs and the flawless Gator defense left them all on first.

In the bottom of the first, Aja Paculba led off with a walk, and Kristina Hilberth's chopper to short put two runners on with no outs when the shortstop looked to get the lead runner. After Ali Gardiner grounded into a 5–3 double play, Enea hit her school-record 18th home run of the season to put Florida up 2–0. Bush hit her solo shot to begin the second inning for the Gators' only other run of the night.

=== Michigan (Women's College World Series - Game 6) ===
	1	2	3	4	5	6	7	R	H	E
Gators	0	0	0	0	0	1	0	1	5	0
Wolverines	0	0	0	0	0	0	0	0	1	0

In their second game at the WCWS, Florida's only run came off the bat of Megan Bush, who homered in the top of the sixth. The one run stood because of another outstanding pitching performance from Stacey Nelson, who allowed one hit (a single), struck out nine, and walked none in her 22nd shutout of the season. Both teams had their chances to score, but neither could convert them into runs. In the top of third, Kristina Hilberth led off with a single and moved to second on a sacrifice bunt from Kim Waleszonia. Aja Paculba flew out to deep left for the second out, and although Tiffany DeFelice drew a two-walk, a force out at third off a fielder's choice kept Florida from scoring. In the fourth, Kelsey Bruder led off with a double, but when Bush struck out and Ali Gardiner grounded out, Bruder found herself on third with two outs. Brooks fouled out to right to end the inning.

Michigan's scoring opportunity came in the bottom of the fourth when Bree Evans led off with a single that barely got past the glove of Bush. Angela Findlay laid down a bunt for the sacrifice, but Nelson unsuccessfully went to second, trying to get the lead runner. Amanda Chidester laid down a sacrifice bunt that moved both runners into scoring position with one out. Nelson struck out Roya St. Clair and Maggie Viefhaus for the second and third outs of the inning. Florida countered again in the following half inning with a one-out single from Waleszonia and a subsequent walk to Paculba. Defelice grounded out to the first baseman, but was able to moved both runners. Nikki Nemitz, who came in to relieve Jordan Taylor, intentionally walked Francesca Enea to bring up Bruder, who struck out.

=== Alabama (Women's College World Series - Game 12) ===
	1	2	3	4	5	6	7	R	H	E
Crimson Tide	0	0	1	0	4	0	0	5	9	1
Gators	0	0	0	2	0	0	4	6	7	2

In their fifth meeting of the season with Alabama, Florida used a walk-off grand slam from Ali Gardiner to send themselves to the WCWS Championship Series. Alabama scored first, as the eventual loser had done in each of the previous meetings, when Kelley Montalvo hit an RBI single up the middle to score Jennifer Fenton from third. Fenton singled to left to lead of the third, advanced to second on a fielding error by Francesca Enea, and moved to third on a groundout. In the bottom of the fourth, Enea drew a lead off walk, and Kelsey Bruder hit a homer to give Florida the lead back.

However, Alabama would go on a two-out rally in the top of the fifth, starting with Brittany Rogers. Rogers barely beat out an infield hit and wasted no time stealing second. She tied the game when Lauren Parker hit a singled to score her. After Montalvo singled and Charlotte Morgan walked to load the bases, Stacey Nelson hit Cassie Reilly-Boccia to bring in the runner at third. Ashley Holcombe doubled to score two more runs and give the Tide a 5–2 lead. Unfortunately for Alabama, in the bottom of seventh, Kelsi Dunne walked the lead off batter. Then, with one out, Enea hit a single to left center. With two outs, Megan Bush drew a five-pitch walk, loading the bases for a slumping Gardiner, who took the 2–1 pitch over the left field wall for her first career grand slam and a 6–5 Florida win. Stephanie Brombacher got the win for Florida as Nelson was pulled from the game after the fifth inning. Brombacher pitched two scoreless innings, allowing one hit and striking out four.

=== Washington (WCWS Championship Series - Game 1) ===
	1	2	3	4	5	6	7	R	H	E
Huskies	0	0	4	0	2	2	0	8	7	0
Gators	0	0	0	0	0	0	0	0	2	2

Florida lost the first game of the Women's College World Series championship series, 8–0, to Washington in a game where the Gators never looked like the team that previously had been undefeated in the postseason. Stacey Nelson recorded only her fourth loss of the season, allowing five hits and six runs, four earned. The righty walked only two and struck out five in the outing. Danielle Lawrie recorded the win for the Huskies, striking out 12, walking three and allowing two Gator hits.

Corrie Brooks and Michelle Moultrie recorded the hits for the Gators, as Brooks tallied an infield single in the third and Moultrie nailed a single to left field in the sixth. Washington, on the other hand, wasted no time getting on base in the first, but the Gators squashed the Huskies’ attempts to cross the plate. Ashley Charters started the game off with a high chopper back to the mound and beat Nelson's throw to first. She then advanced to third on a Gator error on Kimi Pohlman's grounder. With two runners in scoring position, Jennifer Salling grounded to sophomore second baseman Aja Paculba, who fired home to Kristina Hilberth to tag out Charter and keep the Huskies off the board. Nelson went to work, getting the next batter swinging and next to ground out to end the inning and leave runners stranded at the corners.

The Huskies tallied four runs in the third to take the lead. Niki Williams led off the inning with a walk and moved to second on a stolen base. Charters followed with a hard-hit single to second and Pohlman hit a chopper to Megan Bush, who looked Williams back at third, but could do nothing with the ball. With the bases loaded, Salling nailed a single up the middle, scoring Williams and Charters. Kim Waleszonia fired home to try to get Charters on a close play at the plate and Hilberth then tried to catch Salling advancing to second, but the ball sailed over Bush's head and both runners were able to hustle home to give Washington a 4–0 lead. After a lead-off walk in the fifth, the Gators got the next two lead runners at second on groundouts. Lawrie singled up the middle to put runners on first and second and Morgan Stuart nailed her fourth double of the WCWS, a new record, to score her teammates.

Stephanie Brombacher relieved Nelson in the sixth. After recording two outs, she gave up her fifth home run of the season to Charters to plate two more Huskies and give UW an 8–0 lead. Brombacher allowed two hits, two walks and the two runs in two innings of work.

=== Washington (WCWS Championship Series - Game 2) ===
	1	2	3	4	5	6	7	R	H	E
Gators	2	0	0	0	0	0	0	2	7	2
Huskies	2	0	1	0	0	0	0	3	6	3

Stacey Nelson struck out five and allowed one walk and six hits in her fifth loss of the season. Nelson and sophomore Megan Bush were named to the WCWS All-Tournament team for their performances. Danielle Lawrie earned both win against the Gators. She struck out eight on the night and allowed seven hits and one earned run.

The Gators took the lead early, tallying two runs in the first to start the game. Aja Paculba led off with a triple to center field and then scored on passed ball on the very next pitch. Kristina Hilberth reached on an error by the shortstop and moved to second an infield single to third by Francesca Enea. After a double steal, both Gators moved into scoring position. Kelsey Bruder drew a walk to load the bases and Bush recorded her second sacrifice fly of the season to bring Hilberth home.

The Huskies evened the score in the bottom of the inning. They tallied two singles before Nelson got Jennifer Salling looking. Lawrie singles through the right side to score one and move a runner to third. A wild pitch tied the score at two apiece. Nelson forced the next two Huskies to ground out to end the inning. Washington then took the lead in the third loading the bases with only one out on an error and two singles. Morgan Stuart hit a dribbler back to the mound, which Nelson could not pick up to score Kimi Pohlman to give the Huskies a 3–2 advantage.

== Ranking Movement ==
Poll	Last	Pre	Wk 1	Wk 2	Wk 3	Wk 4	Wk 5	Wk 6	Wk 7	Wk 8	Wk 9	Wk 10	Wk 11	Wk 12	Wk 13	Wk 14	Final
NFCA	3	1	2	2	2	2	1	1	1	1	1	1*	1*	1*	1*	1*	2
USA Softball	3	1	2	2	2	2	1	1	1	1	1	1*	1*	1*	1	1*	2
* Indicates unanimous selection.

== Roster ==
The 2009 Florida Gators softball team has 7 seniors, 2 juniors, 7 sophomores, and 4 freshmen.

#	Name	Position	Height	B/T	Year	Hometown
2	Kelsey Bruder	UT	5-5	L/R	So	Corona, CA
3	Aja Paculba	2B	5-3	R/R	So	Wildomar, CA
4	Danyell Hines	OF	5-6	L/R	Sr	Bryan, TX
5	Kim Waleszonia	CF	5-4	L/R	Sr	Fontana, CA
7	Lauren Heil	INF	5-5	R/R	Fr	Pembroke Pines, FL
8	Kristine Priebe	C	5-10	R/R	So	Moorpark, CA
9	Alicia Sisco	OF	5-4	L/R	Fr	Cooper City, FL
10	Francesca Enea	LF	5-8	R/R	Jr	Woodland Hills, CA
12	Megan Bush	SS	5-5	R/R	So	Anaheim Hills, CA
13	Shaunice Harris	3B	5-5	R/R	RFr	Moreno Valley, CA
15	Brooke Johnson	OF	5-8	R/R	Sr	Lakeland, FL
16	Michelle Moultrie	OF	5-3	L/R	Fr	Jacksonville, FL
20	Le-Net Franklin	INF	5-7	L/R	Sr	Belton, TX
24	Ali Gardiner	1B	5-7	L/L	Sr	Waccabuc, NY
26	Ami Austin	UT	5-3	L/L	Fr	Ormond Beach, FL
27	Corrie Brooks	3B	5-9	R/R	Jr	Christmas, FL
28	Tiffany DeFelice	C	5-5	R/R	So	Coral Springs, FL
31	Kristina Hilberth	C	5-6	L/R	Sr	Dunedin, FL
32	Stephanie Brombacher	RHP	5-10	R/R	So	Pembroke Pines, FL
42	Stacey Nelson	RHP	5-10	R/R	Sr	Los Alamitos, CA

== Coaching staff ==
Head coach: Tim Walton (4th season)
Assistant Coaches: Jennifer Rocha (4th season), Jenny Gladding (3rd season)
Student Coach: Mary Ratliff (1st season)
Athletic Trainer: Eric King
Student Trainer: Melissa Rosen
Strength & Conditioning Coordinator: Steven Orris
Academic Counselor: Tony Meacham
Communications: Zanna Ollove
Program Coordinator: Brittany Souilliard
Managers: Jessica Drew, Alex Dorsh, and Katherine Gladding

== Statistics ==
Statistics through all 68 games.

Player	BA	GS-GP	AB	R	H	2B	3B	HR	RBI	Slg%	BB	HBP	SO	OB%	SB-Att	PO	A	E	Fld%
Ami Austin	.000	27-0	0	13	0	0	0	0	0	.000	0	0	0	.000	2-2	0	0	0	.000
Corrie Brooks	.301	68-68	193	38	58	11	1	11	52	.539	14	1	43	.344	2-2	58	112	6	.966
Kelsey Bruder	.369	68-68	195	54	72	17	1	16	68	.713	31	8	40	.464	7-11	58	7	1	.985
Megan Bush	.327	67-66	153	37	50	11	0	16	46	.712	32	3	35	.447	1-1	83	76	10	.941
Tiffany DeFelice	.230	49-41	100	8	23	2	0	1	12	.280	27	0	11	.394	0-0	90	2	0	1.000
Francesca Enea	.339	68-66	174	37	59	11	0	18	71	.713	48	7	31	.494	3-4	29	1	1	.968
Le-Net Franklin	.250	36-3	20	8	5	0	0	1	3	.400	0	0	2	.250	2-4	7	8	2	.882
Ali Gardiner	.295	68-67	200	37	59	11	1	9	48	.495	38	1	36	.408	3-3	370	13	3	.992
Shaunice Harris	.200	10-0	5	0	1	0	0	0	2	.200	3	0	1	.500	0-0	1	2	1	.750
Lauren Heil	.000	35-0	2	15	0	0	0	0	0	.000	0	0	1	.000	11-14	1	3	0	1.000
Kristina Hilberth	.386	63-60	171	36	66	5	1	0	20	.427	10	1	24	.421	10-14	469	23	3	.994
Danyell Hines	.000	22-1	3	6	0	0	0	0	0	.000	1	0	2	.250	0-0	1	0	0	1.000
Brooke Johnson	.000	53-2	10	14	0	0	0	0	0	.000	1	0	4	.091	5-8	2	1	0	1.000
Michelle Moultrie	.261	60-41	115	22	30	5	1	2	17	.374	2	2	12	.281	15-20	27	2	3	.906
Aja Paculba	.368	68-68	204	69	75	11	5	9	34	.603	49	1	29	.492	27-32	94	102	7	.966
Kristine Priebe	.190	20-9	21	9	4	1	0	2	7	.524	8	5	4	.500	0-0	6	1	0	1.000
Alicia Sisco	.404	32-19	47	9	19	3	0	0	5	.468	5	2	11	.481	0-0	8	1	0	1.000
Kim Waleszonia	.326	37-33	89	18	29	1	4	1	11	.461	5	3	21	.381	5-5	12	1	0	1.000
Totals	.323	68-68	1702	431	550	89	14	86	396	.543	274	34	307	.423	93-120	1332	470	43	.977

Key: BA = Batting Average, GP-GS = Games Played-Games Started, AB = At Bat, R = Runs Scored, H = Hits, 2B = Doubles, 3B = Triples, HR = Home Runs, RBI = Runs Batted In, Slg% = Slugging Percentage, BB = Walks, HBP = Hits By Pitch, SO = Strikeouts, OB% = On-Base Percentage, SB-Att = Stolen Bases-Attempted Stolen Bases, PO = Putouts, A = Assists, E = Errors, Fld% = Fielding Percentage

Pitcher	ERA	W-L	APP-GS	CG	SHO	SV	IP	H	R	ER	BB	SO	2B	3B	HR	AB	B/AVG	WP	HBP	BK
Stephanie Brombacher	0.84	22-0	34-27	18	14/3	1	158.2	88	27	19	29	190	12	2	5	547	.161	2	16	4
Stacey Nelson	0.61	41-5	50-41	34	22/3	3	285.1	162	40	25	52	357	22	0	1	1004	.161	12	20	0
Totals	0.69	63-5	68-68	52	39/3	4	444.0	250	67	44	81	547	34	2	6	1551	.161	14	36	4

Key: ERA = Earned Run Average, W-L = Wins-Losses, APP-GS = Appearances-Starts, CG = Complete Games, SHO = Shutouts/Combined Shutouts, SV = Saves, IP = Innings Pitched, H = Hits Against, R = Runs Against, ER = Earned Runs Against, BB = Walks, SO = Strikeouts, 2B = Doubles Against, 3B = Triples Against, HR = Home Runs Against, AB = At-Bats, B/AVG = Opponent's Batting Average, WP = Wild Pitches, HBP = Hits By Pitch, BK = Balks

== See also ==
- Florida Gators softball
