= 2009 NCAA Division I softball tournament =

- Teams: 64
- Finals site: ASA Hall of Fame Stadium; Oklahoma City
- Champions: Washington (1st title)
- Runner-up: Florida (2nd WCWS Appearance)
- Winning coach: Heather Tarr (1st title)
- MOP: Danielle Lawrie (Washington)

The 2009 NCAA Division I softball tournament was held from May 15 through June 3, 2009 as part of the 2009 NCAA Division I softball season. The 64 NCAA Division I college softball teams were selected out of an eligible 284 teams on May 10, 2009. 30 teams were awarded an automatic bid as champions of their conference, and 34 teams were selected at-large by the NCAA Division I Softball Selection Committee. The tournament culminated with eight teams playing in the 2009 Women's College World Series at ASA Hall of Fame Stadium in Oklahoma City, Oklahoma.

== National seeds ==
Teams in italics advanced to the Super Regionals. Teams in bold have advanced to the Women's College World Series.

1. **Florida**
2. UCLA
3. **Washington**
4. **Alabama**
5. **Michigan**
6. **Georgia**
7. Oklahoma
8. Stanford
9. **Arizona**
10. **Arizona State**
11. Ohio State
12. Northwestern
13. Tennessee
14. Georgia Tech
15. DePaul
16. Florida State

== Regionals and Super Regionals ==
=== Gainesville Super Regional ===
First Round	Second Round
1	**Florida**	**12**
Florida A&M	0
1	**Florida**	**7**
Texas A&M	1
Lehigh	0
**Texas A&M**	**1**
Gainesville Regional
Florida A&M	0
**Lehigh**	**9**
Texas A&M	2
**Lehigh**	**3**
16	Florida State	0
**Oklahoma State**	**1**
Oklahoma State	0
**California**	**2**
**California**	**8**
Mississippi State	3
Tallahassee Regional
16	**Florida State**	**5**
Mississippi State	0
**Oklahoma State**	**1**
16	Florida State	0

Regional Finals
1	**Florida**	**9**	—
Lehigh	0	—
**California**	**2**	—
Oklahoma State	1	—

Super Regionals
1	**Florida**	**2**	**2**	—
California	0	1	—

=== Stanford Super Regional ===
First Round	Second Round
8	**Stanford**	**10**
Portland State	3
8	**Stanford**	**9**
Nevada	1
Cal Poly	1
**Nevada**	**4**
Stanford Regional
Portland State	0
**Cal Poly**	**5**
Nevada	1
**Cal Poly**	**6**
9	**Arizona**	**9**
Tennessee–Martin	3
9	**Arizona**	**18**
Louisville	4
Purdue	1
**Louisville**	**4**
Louisville Regional
Tennessee-Martin	2
**Purdue**	**6**
**Purdue**	**5**
Louisville	4

Regional Finals
8	**Stanford**	**4**	—
Cal Poly	0	—
9	**Arizona**	**4**	—
Purdue	2	—

Super Regionals
8	Stanford	**6**	3	5
9	**Arizona**	4	**7**	**6**

=== Ann Arbor Super Regional ===
First Round	Second Round
5	**Michigan**	**11**
Miami (OH)	3
5	**Michigan**	**2**
Notre Dame	1
Cleveland State	1
**Notre Dame**	**3**
Ann Arbor Regional
**Miami (OH)**	**5**
Cleveland State	4
**Notre Dame**	**5**
Miami (OH)	3
12	Northwestern	0
**Texas State**	**8**
Texas State	4
**Baylor**	**7**
Louisiana–Lafayette	1
**Baylor**	**2**
Waco Regional
12	Northwestern	2
**Louisiana–Lafayette**	**3**
Texas State	0
**Louisiana–Lafayette**	**5**

Regional Finals
5	**Michigan**	**4**	—
Notre Dame	0	—
**Baylor**	**6**	—
Louisiana–Lafayette	1	—

Super Regionals
5	**Michigan**	**8**	**7**	—
Baylor	1	1	—

=== Tuscaloosa Super Regional ===
First Round	Second Round
4	**Alabama**	**12**
Mississippi Valley State	3
4	**Alabama**	**10**
Texas	1
**Texas**	**1**
Chattanooga	0
Tuscaloosa Regional
**Mississippi Valley State**	**1**
Chattanooga	0
Mississippi Valley State	0
**Texas**	**4**
13	**Tennessee**	**4**
James Madison	3
Nebraska	2
13	**Tennessee**	**5**
**Nebraska**	**4**
Jacksonville State	2
Knoxville Regional
James Madison	0
**Jacksonville State**	**6**
Nebraska	1
**Jacksonville State**	**4**

Regional Finals
4	**Alabama**	**7**	—
Texas	0	—
13	Tennessee	1	1
**Jacksonville State**	**6**	**2**

Super Regionals
4	**Alabama**	**9**	**9**	—
Jacksonville State	0	0	—

=== Atlanta Super Regional ===
First Round	Second Round
3	**Washington**	**9**
Sacred Heart	1
3	**Washington**	**3**
UMass	1
Cornell	0
**UMass**	**8**
Amherst Regional
**Sacred Heart**	**3**
Cornell	1
**UMass**	**8**
Sacred Heart	0
14	**Georgia Tech**	**5**
Boston University	1
14	**Georgia Tech**	**4**
Auburn	1
Iowa	0
**Auburn**	**1**
Atlanta Regional
**Boston University**	**3**
Iowa	0
Auburn	0
**Boston University**	**5**

Regional Finals
3	**Washington**	1	**6**
UMass	**5**	1
14	**Georgia Tech**	**7**	—
Boston University	2	—

Super Regionals
3	**Washington**	**7**	**7**	—
14	Georgia Tech	1	0	—

=== Athens Super Regional ===
First Round	Second Round
6	**Georgia**	**3**
Radford	1
6	**Georgia**	**6**
North Carolina	0
**North Carolina**	**21**
Campbell	2
Chapel Hill Regional
Campbell	5
**Radford**	**9**
**North Carolina**	**9**
Radford	4
11	**Ohio State**	**3**
Canisius	2
11	**Ohio State**	**5**
BYU	4
**BYU**	**6**
Kentucky	2
Columbus Regional
Canisius	0
**Kentucky**	**7**
BYU	2
**Kentucky**	**4**

Regional Finals
6	**Georgia**	**4**	—
North Carolina	2	—
11	**Ohio State**	**7**	—
Kentucky	2	—

Super Regionals
6	**Georgia**	**6**	**7**	—
11	Ohio State	4	6	—

=== Tempe Super Regional ===
First Round	Second Round
7	Oklahoma	0
**North Dakota State**	**1**
**North Dakota State**	**3**
Tulsa	2
**Tulsa**	**6**
Arkansas	0
Norman Regional
7	**Oklahoma**	**21**
Arkansas	2
**Tulsa**	**5**
7	Oklahoma	3
10	**Arizona State**	**5**
San Diego State	0
10	Arizona State	2
**LSU**	**10**
**LSU**	**3**
Cal State Fullerton	2
Tempe Regional
San Diego State	2
**Cal State Fullerton**	**8**
10	**Arizona State**	**7**
Cal State Fullerton	0

Regional Finals
**North Dakota State**	**4**	—
Tulsa	1	—
LSU	4	0
10	**Arizona State**	**6**	**5**

Super Regionals
10	**Arizona State**	**3**	**11**	—
North Dakota State	0	0	—

=== Los Angeles Super Regional ===
First Round	Second Round
2	**UCLA**	**4**
Long Beach State	2
2	**UCLA**	**4**
Fresno State	2
**Fresno State**	**2**
UNLV	1
Los Angeles Regional
**Long Beach State**	**3**
UNLV	1
**Fresno State**	**12**
Long Beach State	2
15	DePaul	0
**Bradley**	**1**
**Missouri**	**2**
Bradley	1
Illinois	1
**Missouri**	**5**
Columbia Regional
15	**DePaul**	**6**
Illinois	0
15	**DePaul**	**2**
Bradley	1

Regional Finals
2	**UCLA**	**9**	—
Fresno State	5	—
**Missouri**	**1**	—
15	DePaul	0	—

Super Regionals
2	UCLA	1	**5**	1
**Missouri**	**2**	2	**9**

== Women's College World Series ==
=== Participants ===
School	Conference	Record (conference)	Head coach	WCWS appearances† (including 2009 WCWS)	WCWS best finish†	WCWS W–L record† (excluding 2009 WCWS)
Alabama	Southeastern	52–9 (21–6)	Patrick Murphy	6 (last: 2008)	3rd (2008)	4–10
Arizona	Pacific-10	46–15 (13–7)	Mike Candrea	21 (last: 2008)	1st (1991, 1993, 1994, 1996, 1997, 2001, 2006, 2007)	57–27
Arizona State	Pacific-10	46–17 (10–11)	Clint Myers	8 (last: 2008)	1st (2008)	10–12
Florida	Southeastern	60–3 (26–1)	Tim Walton	2 (last: 2008)	3rd (2008)	3–2
Georgia	Southeastern	44–10 (18–7)	Lu Harris-Champer	1	-	-
Michigan	Big Ten	46–10 (17–3)	Carol Hutchins	9 (last: 2005)	1st (2005)	7–16
Missouri	Big 12	50–10 (12–6)	Ehren Earleywine	4 (last: 1994)	5th (1991)	1–6
Washington	Pacific-10	46–11 (14–7)	Heather Tarr	9 (last: 2007)	1st (2009)	15–14

† Excludes results of the pre-NCAA Women's College World Series of 1969 through 1981.

=== Tournament notes ===
- Alabama advanced to the Women's College World Series after sophomore pitcher Kelsi Dunne, threw back-to-back no-hitters in the Tuscaloosa Super Regional, an NCAA record.
- The SEC advanced three teams to the Women's College World Series for the first time in conference history; it was also the first time a conference outside the Pac-10 had done it.

=== Bracket and Results ===
First round
1	**Florida**	**3**
9	Arizona	0
4	Alabama	1
5	**Michigan**	**6**
9	Arizona	0
4	**Alabama**	**14**
3	**Washington**	**3**
6	Georgia	1
10	**Arizona State**	**7**
Missouri	3
6	**Georgia**	**5**
Missouri	2

Second round
1	**Florida**	**1**
5	Michigan	0
10	Arizona State	2
4	**Alabama**	**6**
3	**Washington**	**1**
10	Arizona State	0
5	Michigan	5
6	**Georgia**	**7**

Semifinals
1	**Florida**	**6**	—
4	Alabama	5	—
3	**Washington**	8	**9**
6	Georgia	**9**	3

Finals
1	Florida	0	2	—
3	**Washington**	**8**	**3**	—

==== Game results ====
Date	Game	Winner	Score	Loser	Notes
May 28, 2009	Game 1	Washington	3-1	Georgia	Niki Williams hit a 2-run HR; Danielle Lawrie allowed 6 hits in a complete game victory.
May 28, 2009	Game 2	Arizona State	7-3	Missouri	
May 28, 2009	Game 3	Michigan	6-1	Alabama	Including this game, Alabama has gone 0-6 on opening day of the WCWS.
May 28, 2009	Game 4	Florida	3-0	Arizona	Against the top home-run-hitting team in the history of college softball, Florida pitcher Stacey Nelson gave up only two singles.
May 29, 2009	Game 5	Washington	1-0	Arizona State	Washington won on a walk-off single from Morgan Stuart in the bottom of the 8th that scored Kimi Pohlman.
May 29, 2009	Game 6	Florida	1-0	Michigan	Florida pitcher Stacey Nelson threw 71 pitches, only 14 of which were balls, in a complete game.
May 30, 2009	Game 7	Georgia	5-2	Missouri	
May 30, 2009	Game 8	Alabama	14-0	Arizona	Alabama broke the record for largest margin of victory in WCWS history.
May 30, 2009	Game 9	Georgia	7-5	Michigan	Georgia broke the record for home runs in a game at the World Series with four.
May 30, 2009	Game 10	Alabama	6-2	Arizona State	Jazlyn Lunceford hit a pinch-hit grand slam in the bottom of the fourth to propel Alabama to a 6-2 win.
May 31, 2009	Game 11	Georgia	9-8	Washington	After 4h15m, the game ended in the bottom of the 9th inning when UW's Danielle Lawrie walked a batter with bases loaded.
May 31, 2009	Game 12	Florida	6-5	Alabama	Ali Gardiner's walk-off grand slam with two outs in the bottom of the 7th inning clinched Florida's spot in the finals.
May 31, 2009	Game 13	Washington	9-3	Georgia	With Washington's victory, the Pac-10 has sent at least one team to the WCWS finals 23 consecutive times.
June 1, 2009	Finals Game 1	Washington	8-0	Florida	Danielle Lawrie struck out 12 in a 2-hit shutout; Ashley Charters & Jenn Salling both had 2 RBIs and scored 2 runs.
June 2, 2009	Finals Game 2	Washington	3-2	Florida	Washington won its first softball national title and became the fifth Pac-10 team to win the WCWS.

==== Championship game ====
School	Top Batter	Stats.
Washington	Danielle Lawrie (P)	2-3 RBI
Florida	Francesca Enea (LF)	2-3 2B SB K

School	Pitcher	IP	H	R	ER	BB	SO	AB	BF
Washington	Danielle Lawrie (W)	7.0	7	2	1	3	8	27	33
Florida	Stacey Nelson (L)	6.0	6	3	2	1	5	24	26

==== Final standings ====
Place	School	WCWS Record
1st	Washington	5-1
2nd	Florida	3-2
3rd	Georgia	3-2
3rd	Alabama	2-2
5th	Michigan	1-2
5th	Arizona State	1-2
7th	Missouri	0-2
7th	Arizona	0-2

=== All-Tournament Team ===
The 2009 Women's College World Series All-Tournament team:
Kelley Montalvo, Alabama
Charlotte Morgan, Alabama
Brittany Rogers, Alabama
Alisa Goler, Georgia
Taylor Schlopy, Georgia
Megan Bush, Florida
Stacey Nelson, Florida
Ashley Charters, Washington
Kimi Pohlman, Washington
Morgan Stuart, Washington
Niki Williams, Washington
Danielle Lawrie, Washington (Most Outstanding Player)

Breakdown by school:
Washington: 5
Alabama: 3
Florida: 2
Georgia: 2

=== WCWS records tied or broken ===
- In Game 8, Alabama broke the record for largest margin of victory in an NCAA-era WCWS game by defeating Arizona 14-0. The record was previously set by Arizona's 12-0 victory over Fresno State in the 1989 WCWS.
- In Game 9, Georgia broke the NCAA-era home run record in a single WCWS game with four: two from Taylor Schlopy, one from Brianna Hesson, and one from Ashley Pauly. Schlopy became only the fourth player in NCAA-era WCWS history to hit two home runs in one game.
- In game 11, Washington's Niki Williams broke the NCAA-era WCWS single-game RBI record with seven RBIs, including a fifth inning grand slam.

=== Post-Series Notes ===
- Despite having 3 teams advance to the semifinals, the SEC failed to win its first ever WCWS, and Washington continued the West Coast's dominance in college softball. As of 2009, only two teams east of the Mississippi River have won the WCWS (Michigan in 2005 and Michigan State in 1976, the latter in the pre-NCAA era).

== See also ==
- NCAA Division I Softball Championship
