= Stacey Nelson =

All-American college softball player, U.S. National softball team member, pitcher

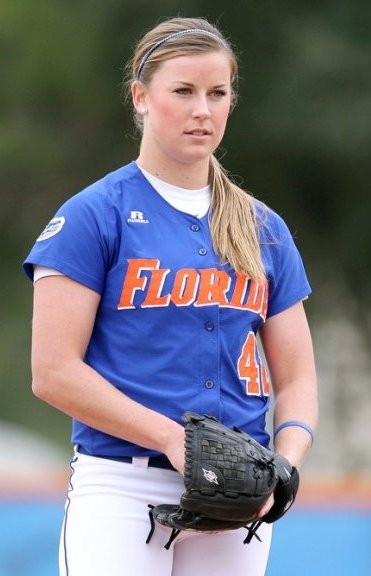
- Nelson in 2009
- Pitcher
- Born: April 12, 1987 (age 39); Los Angeles County, California, U.S.
- Batted: Right Threw: Right

debut
- February 11, 2006, for the Florida Gators

Last appearance
- June 3, 2009, for the Florida Gators

Career statistics
- Win–loss record: 136-36
- Earned run average: 0.99
- Strikeouts: 1116
- Shutouts: 60
- Complete Games: 133
- Innings Pitched: 1141.2

Teams
- Florida Gators (2005–2009)

Stacey Lauren Nelson (born April 12, 1987) is an American, former college softball All-American pitcher. She played at Florida from 2006 to 2009, leading the University of Florida to its first Women's College World Series berth in 2008 and a national runner-up appearance in the 2009 Women's College World Series. Nelson was also the 13th pick in the 2009 National Pro Fastpitch's draft by the defunct Washington Glory. Nelson pitched for the United States women's national softball team in 2009 and 2010 before attending law school at Loyola Law School in Los Angeles. She is the Florida career record holder wins, ERA, shutouts and innings pitched. She also ranks all-time in several career categories in the Southeastern Conference and the NCAA Division I.

== Early life ==
Nelson was born in Los Angeles County, California and raised in Los Alamitos, California. She attended Los Alamitos High School, and was coached during her high school softball career by Jim Dolan. She set school records for career shutouts and single season strikeouts, while her high school won the Sunset League title all four years of her career. Her team were 2003 California Interscholastic Federation (CIF) Quarterfinalists and 2004 CIF Runners-up. She was named the team's Most Valuable Player in 2004 & 2005. Nelson was named to the All-Sunset League and All-County team twice and named 2005 Sunset League Pitcher of the Year and Los Alamitos High School's Female Athlete of the Year.

== Florida Gators ==
Nelson began her career being put on the Southeastern Conference Freshman Team and setting a school record in season saves. In her sophomore year, Nelson was named to the second team for both the Southeastern Conference and the NFCA. She broke the school records for season wins, strikeouts and innings pitched, all remain top-5 marks; her ERA, shutouts and opponents batting average were and continue to be top-10 all-time. The wins are also 10th best for the conference.

As a junior, Nelson made the NFCA First Team and was awarded Southeastern Conference Pitcher of The Year. Earning a conference pitching Triple Crown, she also broke her own season records in wins (led NCAA and set the Junior Class record), strikeouts and innings, while her ERA also improved to the top of the school list. Her opponents average, shutouts and strikeout ratio still rank top-10. In the conference her wins, ERA and innings also remain top-10.

On February 27, Nelson tied and set a school and career single game record fanning 16 batters vs. the Long Beach State 49ers. Winning pitcher Brooke Turner matched the total for 32 combined strikeouts, a top-10 NCAA record. Beginning on March 13, with an 8-4 victory over the Alabama Crimson Tide, the Gator went on a 26 consecutive game win streak, snapped by the UCF Knights on May 18. Leading her team to a No. 1 seed, the Gators reached the Women's College World Series and responded to an opening loss with three wins to get to the semifinals where they were eventually eliminated by the Texas A&M Aggies on June 2. Nelson was named to the WCWS All-Tournament Team.

For a final time Nelson was a NFCA First Team honoree and Southeastern Conference Pitcher of The Year. With a second conference Triple Crown and two no-hitters in tow, she set new school records in season ERA (tops in the NCAA), WHIP and shutouts, which helped her to the all-time season Triple Crown for the school. Her wins, strikeouts, innings, strikeout ratio (career best 8.7) and opponents average are top-5 records. The ERA and wins rank fifth for a Southeastern Conference season.

In a February 20 win against the Arizona State Sun Devils, Nelson collected her 100th victory. On April 4-May 3, Nelson achieved a career best 51.1 consecutive scoreless inning streak. She was 11-0 over 12 games (6 complete), whiffing 66 and surrendering 24 hits and 8 walks for a 0.62 WHIP. Later during that streak on April 26 and for one of her no-hitters, she also garnered the 1000th strikeout of her career, defeating the Arkansas Razorbacks. To reach that year's WCWS, she bested the Texas A&M Aggies on May 16 with a 14 strikeout performance in regulation for a career high. Repeating their previous tournament seeding, the team went undefeated in getting to the finals and Nelson pitched two shutouts before suffering back-to-back losses to eventual champions the Washington Huskies, concluding on June 2. She was again named All-Tournament for her efforts.

Nelson would graduate with and maintains the Florida career crown in wins, ERA, shutouts and innings pitched; her strikeouts, opponents average and strikeout ratio are currently top-5 all-time. Additionally, she ranks top-5 in all but the three latter categories for her school's conference. In the NCAA, her wins tie her at sixth place along with several season records.

== Awards and honors ==
- 2007 - SEC Academic Honor Roll
- 2007 - NFCA All-Southeast Region
- 2007 - NFCA/Louisville Slugger All-American second team
- 2007 - Easton All-American Pitcher
- 2008 - SEC First Team
- 2008 - SEC Academic Honor Roll
- 2008 - SEC Tournament MVP
- 2008 - NFCA All-Southeast Region
- 2008 - NFCA/Louisville Slugger All-American first team
- 2008 - SEC Player of the Year
- 2008 - ESPN The Magazine Academic First-Team All-American
- 2008 - Easton All-American Pitcher
- 2009 - Top three-finalist for the 2009 USA Softball Collegiate Player of the Year
- 2009 - SEC First-Team
- 2009 - SEC Academic Honor Roll
- 2009 - NFCA/Louisville Slugger All-American first team
- 2009 - ESPN The Magazine Academic All-American of the Year
- 2009 - SEC Pitcher of the Year
- 2009 - Lowe's Senior CLASS Award
- 2014 - All-Brazilian Joao Pedro Tournament Champion

== Law School ==
Nelson attended Loyola Law School from 2011-2014. After a career as a jail monitor at the Office of Inspector from 2014-2021, she began teaching at Loyola, working for the Project for the Innocent, and consulting on law enforcement-related issues via work for OIR Group.

== Philanthropy ==
Her interest in child soldiers has grown into a project in northern Uganda. With the goal of creating jobs for those affected by the LRA War, Nelson is working to open a bread factory in Pader, Uganda. She has worked to develop a self-sustainable agricultural model that will continue to provide locally long after her direct involcement.

== Career statistics ==
=== University of Florida ===
| YEAR | W | L | GP | GS | CG | SHO | SV | IP | H | R | ER | BB | SO | ERA | WHIP |
| 2006 | 14 | 12 | 39 | 24 | 19 | 6 | 5 | 186.0 | 171 | 71 | 56 | 43 | 111 | 2.10 | 1.15 |
| 2007 | 34 | 14 | 58 | 42 | 37 | 14 | 5 | 318.0 | 205 | 56 | 43 | 74 | 285 | 0.94 | 0.87 |
| 2008 | 47 | 5 | 59 | 49 | 43 | 18 | 5 | 352.1 | 200 | 56 | 38 | 116 | 363 | 0.75 | 0.89 |
| 2009 | 41 | 5 | 50 | 41 | 34 | 22 | 3 | 285.1 | 162 | 40 | 25 | 52 | 357 | 0.61 | 0.75 |
| TOTALS | 136 | 36 | 206 | 156 | 133 | 60 | 18 | 1141.2 | 738 | 223 | 162 | 285 | 1116 | 0.99 | 0.89 |
