= List of LSU Tigers head baseball coaches =

The LSU Tigers baseball program is a college baseball team that represents Louisiana State University in the Western Division of the Southeastern Conference in the National Collegiate Athletic Association. The team has had 25 head coaches since it started playing organized baseball in the 1893 season. The current coach is Jay Johnson, who was hired in June 2021.

Since its creation in 1947, four LSU coaches, Skip Bertman, Smoke Laval, Paul Mainieri, and Jay Johnson, have led the Tigers to the College World Series. With Bertman winning five national championships, and Mainieri and Johnson winning one championship each. Seven coaches have won conference championships with LSU: Harry Rabenhorst, A. L. Swanson, Ray Didier, Jim Smith, Bertman, Laval, and Mainieri have all won Southeastern Conference (SEC) championships.

Skip Bertman is the all-time leader in games coached (1,203) and total wins (870). Harry Rabenhorst is the all-time leader in seasons coached (27). E. B. Young has the highest winning percentage of any Tiger coach with a 1–0–0 record (1.000) in his one season at LSU. Moon Ducote has the lowest winning percentage (.308) in his one season at LSU.

In 2006, Bertman was inducted into the National College Baseball Hall of Fame.

== Key ==
General
#	Number of coaches (Note: A running total of the number of head coaches.)
GC	Games coached
†	Elected to the National College Baseball Hall of Fame

Overall
OW	Wins
OL	Losses
OT	Ties
O%	Winning percentage

Conference (Note: LSU was a member of the Southern Intercollegiate Athletic Association from 1896 until 1921, but the conference did not sponsor baseball. The Southern Conference, of which LSU was a member from 1922 until 1932, did not sponsor baseball until 1947. Since 1933, LSU has been a member of the Southeastern Conference.)
CW	Wins
CL	Losses
CT	Ties
C%	Winning percentage

Postseason (Note: Postseason play involving the NCAA Division I Baseball Championship.)
PA	Total Appearances (Note: Postseason appearances include seasons with NCAA Division I Baseball Championship bids since the tournament began in 1947.)
PW	Total Wins
PL	Total Losses
WA	College World Series appearances (Note: College World Series appearances include seasons with CWS bids since the tournament began in 1947.)
WW	College World Series wins
WL	College World Series losses

Championships
DC	Division regular season (Note: From 1959–1985 and from 1992–present the west division finish is listed.)
CC	Conference regular season
CT	Conference tournament (Note: The Southeastern Conference began a baseball tournament in 1977.)

== Coaches ==
List of head baseball coaches showing season(s) coached, overall records, conference records, postseason records, championships and selected awards*Statistics correct as of the end of the 2019 NCAA Division I baseball season
#	Name	Term (Note: LSU did not sponsor a baseball team in 1894, 1896 and 1904.)	GC	OW	OL	OT	O%	CW	CL	CT	C%	PA	PW	PL	WA	WW	WL	DCs	CCs	CTs	NCs	Awards (Note: National, regional and conference coach of the year awards.)
1	E. B. Young	1893	1	1	0	0	1.000	—	—	—	—	—	—	—	—	—	—	—	—	—	0	—
2	No coach	1895	4	0	3	1	.125	—	—	—	—	—	—	—	—	—	—	—	—	—	0	—
3	E. A. Scott	1897	6	3	3	0	.500	—	—	—	—	—	—	—	—	—	—	—	—	—	0	—
4	Allen Jeardeau	1898	5	2	3	0	.400	—	—	—	—	—	—	—	—	—	—	—	—	—	0	—
5	C. V. Cusachs	1899	11	5	5	1	.500	—	—	—	—	—	—	—	—	—	—	—	—	—	0	—
6	L. P. Piper	1900–1901	15	8	6	1	.567	—	—	—	—	—	—	—	—	—	—	—	—	—	0	—
7	W. S. Borland	1902–1903	22	10	11	1	.477	—	—	—	—	—	—	—	—	—	—	—	—	—	0	—
8	Dan A. Killian	1905–1906	23	14	9	0	.609	—	—	—	—	—	—	—	—	—	—	—	—	—	0	—
9	J. Phillips	1907	18	11	7	0	.611	—	—	—	—	—	—	—	—	—	—	—	—	—	0	—
10	Edgar Wingard	1908–1909	39	16	22	1	.423	—	—	—	—	—	—	—	—	—	—	—	—	—	0	—
11	John W. Mayhew	1910–1911	31	15	16	0	.484	—	—	—	—	—	—	—	—	—	—	—	—	—	0	—
12	Robert Pender	1912–1913	32	15	17	0	.469	—	—	—	—	—	—	—	—	—	—	—	—	—	0	—
13	Charles C. Stroud	1914–1921	138	75	58	5	.562	—	—	—	—	—	—	—	—	—	—	—	—	—	0	—
14	Branch Bocock	1922–1923	32	15	15	2	.500	—	—	—	—	—	—	—	—	—	—	—	—	—	0	—
15	Moon Ducote	1924	13	4	9	0	.308	—	—	—	—	—	—	—	—	—	—	—	—	—	0	—
16	Mike Donahue	1925–1926	33	15	15	3	.500	—	—	—	—	—	—	—	—	—	—	—	—	—	0	—
17	Harry Rabenhorst	1927–1942, 1946–1956	475	228	240	7	.487	116	145	2	.445	0	0	0	0	0	0	—	2	—	0	—
18	A. L. Swanson	1943–1945	51	28	23	0	.549	11	3	0	.786	0	0	0	0	0	0	—	1	—	0	—
19	Raymond Didier	1957–1963	184	104	79	1	.568	56	50	1	.528	0	0	0	0	0	0	1	1	—	0	—
20	Jim Waldrop	1964–1965	42	17	24	1	.417	9	18	0	.333	0	0	0	0	0	0	0	0	—	0	—
21	Jim Smith	1966–1978	489	238	251	0	.487	102	136	0	.429	1	1	2	0	0	0	3	1	0	0	SEC (1975)
22	Jack Lamabe	1979–1983	249	134	115	0	.538	46	55	0	.455	0	0	0	0	0	0	0	0	0	0	—
23	Skip Bertman †	1984–2001	1,203	870	330	3	.724	328	159	2	.673	16	89	29	11	47	13	9	7	6	5	SEC (1986, 90, 91, 92, 93, 96, 97); SN (1986); ABCA (1991, 93, 96, 97, 2000); BA (1986, 96); CB (1991, 93, 96, 97, 2000);
24	Smoke Laval	2002–2006	320	210	109	1	.604	97	77	0	.557	4	16	10	2	0	4	2	1	0	0	SEC (2003)
25	Paul Mainieri	2007–2021	849	591	255	3	.698	229	156	3	.594	11	51	24	5	11	10	6	4	6	1	SEC (2009, 15); ABCA (2009); BA (2009); CB (2009); NCBWA (2015); SBA (2015)
26	Jay Johnson	2022-present	29	20	9	0	–	—	—	—	—	—	—	—	—	—	—	—	—	—	2	—

== Notes ==
Sources:
