= List of LSU Tigers baseball seasons =

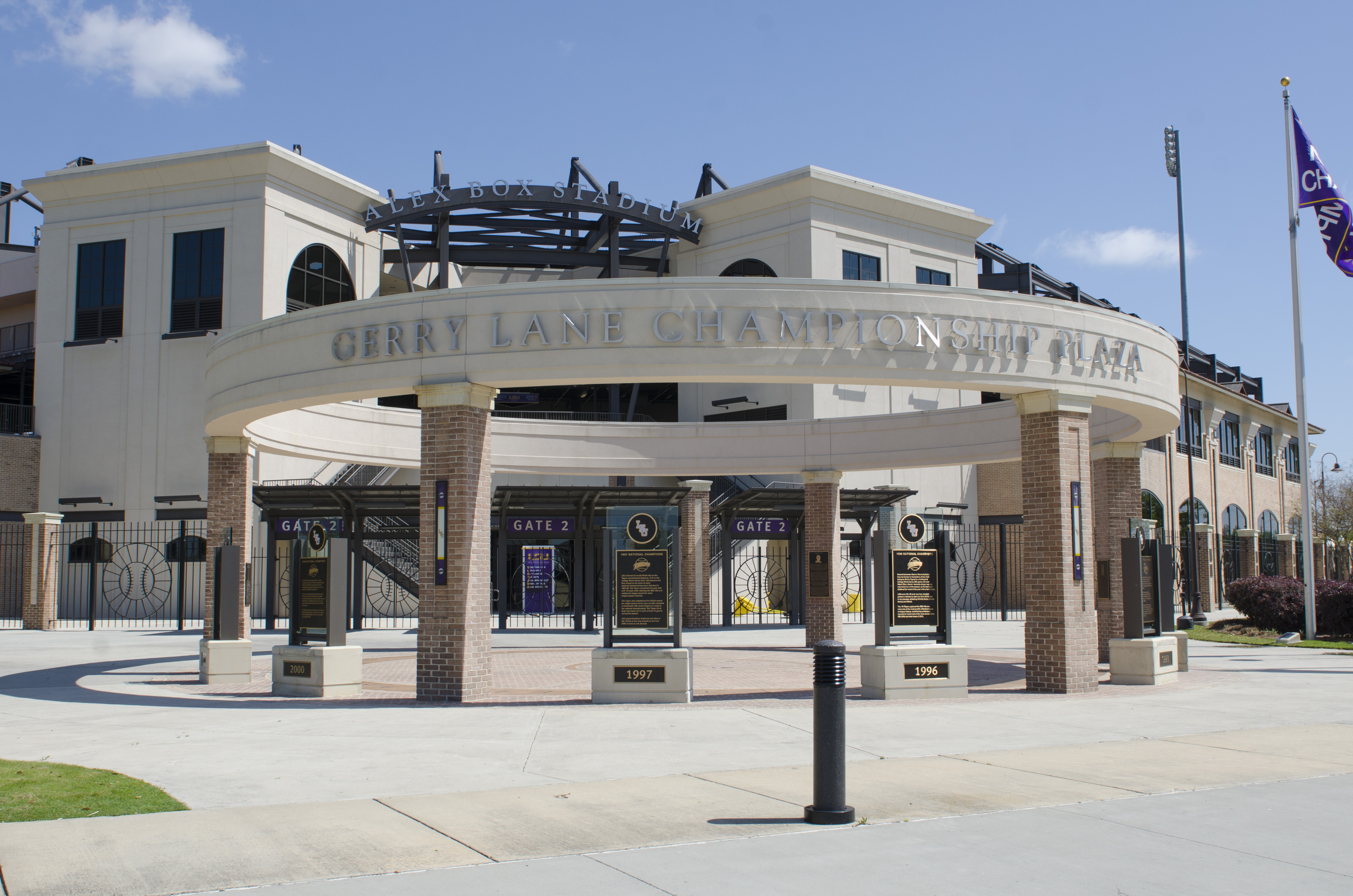
Alex Box Stadium, Skip Bertman Field

This is a list of LSU Tigers baseball seasons. The LSU Tigers baseball program is the college baseball team that represents Louisiana State University in the Western Division of the Southeastern Conference (SEC) in the National Collegiate Athletic Association. LSU plays their home games at Alex Box Stadium, Skip Bertman Field on the LSU Campus in Baton Rouge, Louisiana.

LSU has won 8 national championships, appeared in 20 College World Series and played in the NCAA Division I Baseball Championship 37 times. The Tigers baseball team has won 17 SEC regular-season championships and 12 SEC Conference Tournament championships.

== Season Results ==
National champions	College World Series berth	NCAA tournament berth	Conference Tournament champions	Conference/Division Regular season Champions

Season	Head coach	Conference (Note: LSU was a member of the Southern Intercollegiate Athletic Association from 1896 until 1921, but the conference did not sponsor baseball. The Southern Conference, of which LSU was a member from 1922 until 1932, did not sponsor baseball until 1947. Since 1933, LSU has been a member of the Southeastern Conference.)	Season results									Tournament results		Final poll (Note: Collegiate Baseball began team rankings in 1959. Baseball America began during the 1981 season. The Coaches' Poll (published by USA Today's Sports Weekly and ESPN) began publishing its rankings during the 1992 season.)		
Season	Head coach	Conference	Overall				Conference					Conference (Note: The Southeastern Conference began a baseball tournament in 1977.)	Postseason (Note: Postseason play involving the NCAA Division I Baseball Championship began in 1947.)	BA	CB	Coaches
Season	Head coach	Conference	Wins	Losses	Ties	%	Wins	Losses	Ties	%	Finish (Note: From 1959–1985 the west division finish is listed.)	Conference	Postseason	BA	CB	Coaches
LSU Tigers
1893	E. B. Young	Independent	1	0	0	1.000	—	—	—	—	—	—	—	—	—	—
1894		Independent	No Team													
1895	No Coach	Independent	0	3	1	.125	—	—	—	—	—	—	—	—	—	—
1896		Southern Intercollegiate Athletic Association	No Team													
1897	E. A. Scott	Southern Intercollegiate Athletic Association	3	3	0	.500	—	—	—	—	—	—	—	—	—	—
1898	Allen Jeardeau	Southern Intercollegiate Athletic Association	2	3	0	.400	—	—	—	—	—	—	—	—	—	—
1899	C. V. Cusachs	Southern Intercollegiate Athletic Association	5	5	1	.500	—	—	—	—	—	—	—	—	—	—
1900	L. P. Piper	Southern Intercollegiate Athletic Association	2	3	2	.429	—	—	—	—	—	—	—	—	—	—
1901	L. P. Piper	Southern Intercollegiate Athletic Association	6	3	0	.667	—	—	—	—	—	—	—	—	—	—
1902	W. S. Borland	Southern Intercollegiate Athletic Association	6	6	1	.500	—	—	—	—	—	—	—	—	—	—
1903	W. S. Borland	Southern Intercollegiate Athletic Association	4	5	0	.444	—	—	—	—	—	—	—	—	—	—
1904		Southern Intercollegiate Athletic Association	No Team													
1905	Dan A. Killian	Southern Intercollegiate Athletic Association	4	6	0	.400	—	—	—	—	—	—	—	—	—	—
1906	Dan A. Killian	Southern Intercollegiate Athletic Association	10	3	0	.769	—	—	—	—	—	—	—	—	—	—
1907	J. Phillips	Southern Intercollegiate Athletic Association	11	7	0	.611	—	—	—	—	—	—	—	—	—	—
1908	Edgar Wingard	Southern Intercollegiate Athletic Association	9	12	1	.432	—	—	—	—	—	—	—	—	—	—
1909	Edgar Wingard	Southern Intercollegiate Athletic Association	7	10	0	.412	—	—	—	—	—	—	—	—	—	—
1910	John W. Mayhew	Southern Intercollegiate Athletic Association	7	9	0	.438	—	—	—	—	—	—	—	—	—	—
1911	John W. Mayhew	Southern Intercollegiate Athletic Association	8	3	0	.727	—	—	—	—	—	—	—	—	—	—
1912	Bob Pender	Southern Intercollegiate Athletic Association	8	6	0	.571	—	—	—	—	—	—	—	—	—	—
1913	Bob Pender	Southern Intercollegiate Athletic Association	7	11	0	.389	—	—	—	—	—	—	—	—	—	—
1914	C. C. Stroud	Southern Intercollegiate Athletic Association	4	10	0	.286	—	—	—	—	—	—	—	—	—	—
1915	C. C. Stroud	Southern Intercollegiate Athletic Association	10	9	1	.525	—	—	—	—	—	—	—	—	—	—
1916	C. C. Stroud	Southern Intercollegiate Athletic Association	15	8	0	.652	—	—	—	—	—	—	—	—	—	—
1917	C. C. Stroud	Southern Intercollegiate Athletic Association	7	4	2	.615	—	—	—	—	—	—	—	—	—	—
1918	C. C. Stroud	Independent	8	4	0	.667	—	—	—	—	—	—	—	—	—	—
1919	C. C. Stroud	Southern Intercollegiate Athletic Association	12	4	0	.750	—	—	—	—	—	—	—	—	—	—
1920	C. C. Stroud	Southern Intercollegiate Athletic Association	10	8	1	.553	—	—	—	—	—	—	—	—	—	—
1921	C. C. Stroud	Southern Intercollegiate Athletic Association	9	11	1	.452	—	—	—	—	—	—	—	—	—	—
1922	Branch Bocock	Southern Conference	7	6	0	.538	—	—	—	—	—	—	—	—	—	—
1923	Branch Bocock	Southern Conference	8	9	2	.474	—	—	—	—	—	—	—	—	—	—
1924	Moon Ducote	Southern Conference	4	9	0	.308	—	—	—	—	—	—	—	—	—	—
1925	Mike Donahue	Southern Conference	5	9	2	.375	—	—	—	—	—	—	—	—	—	—
1926	Mike Donahue	Southern Conference	10	6	1	.618	—	—	—	—	—	—	—	—	—	—
1927	Harry Rabenhorst	Southern Conference	8	6	0	.571	—	—	—	—	—	—	—	—	—	—
1928	Harry Rabenhorst	Southern Conference	7	11	0	.389	—	—	—	—	—	—	—	—	—	—
1929	Harry Rabenhorst	Southern Conference	3	6	0	.333	—	—	—	—	—	—	—	—	—	—
1930	Harry Rabenhorst	Southern Conference	6	8	0	.429	—	—	—	—	—	—	—	—	—	—
1931	Harry Rabenhorst	Southern Conference	3	6	1	.350	—	—	—	—	—	—	—	—	—	—
1932	Harry Rabenhorst	Southern Conference	4	7	1	.375	—	—	—	—	—	—	—	—	—	—
1933	Harry Rabenhorst	Southeastern Conference	2	8	0	.200	0	4	0	.000	7th	—	—	—	—	—
1934	Harry Rabenhorst	Southeastern Conference	6	8	1	.433	3	6	0	.333	7th	—	—	—	—	—
1935	Harry Rabenhorst	Southeastern Conference	8	7	0	.533	4	6	0	.400	6th	—	—	—	—	—
1936	Harry Rabenhorst	Southeastern Conference	15	4	0	.789	7	4	0	.636	2nd	—	—	—	—	—
1937	Harry Rabenhorst	Southeastern Conference	12	14	0	.462	5	10	0	.333	7th	—	—	—	—	—
1938	Harry Rabenhorst	Southeastern Conference	7	8	1	.469	3	6	1	.350	8th	—	—	—	—	—
1939	Harry Rabenhorst	Southeastern Conference	22	6	0	.786	10	2	0	.833	1st	—	—	—	—	—
1940	Harry Rabenhorst	Southeastern Conference	16	5	0	.762	10	4	0	.714	3rd	—	—	—	—	—
1941	Harry Rabenhorst	Southeastern Conference	10	13	0	.435	5	9	0	.357	9th	—	—	—	—	—
1942	Harry Rabenhorst	Southeastern Conference	9	9	0	.500	7	5	0	.583	4th	—	—	—	—	—
1943	A. L. Swanson	Southeastern Conference	13	8	0	.619	11	3	0	.786	1st	—	—	—	—	—
1944	A. L. Swanson	Southeastern Conference	4	8	0	.333	—	—	—	—	—	—	—	—	—	—
1945	A. L. Swanson	Southeastern Conference	11	7	0	.611	—	—	—	—	—	—	—	—	—	—
1946	Harry Rabenhorst	Southeastern Conference	12	5	0	.706	11	3	0	.786	1st	—	—	—	—	—
1947	Harry Rabenhorst	Southeastern Conference	10	9	1	.525	4	7	0	.364	10th	—	—	—	—	—
1948	Harry Rabenhorst	Southeastern Conference	7	14	1	.341	4	10	0	.286	9th	—	—	—	—	—
1949	Harry Rabenhorst	Southeastern Conference	6	11	0	.353	5	9	0	.357	9th	—	—	—	—	—
1950	Harry Rabenhorst	Southeastern Conference	5	9	1	.367	2	7	1	.250	11th	—	—	—	—	—
1951	Harry Rabenhorst	Southeastern Conference	10	6	0	.625	6	6	0	.500	5th	—	—	—	—	—
1952	Harry Rabenhorst	Southeastern Conference	9	11	0	.450	7	9	0	.438	7th	—	—	—	—	—
1953	Harry Rabenhorst	Southeastern Conference	8	10	0	.444	7	8	0	.467	7th	—	—	—	—	—
1954	Harry Rabenhorst	Southeastern Conference	8	11	0	.421	5	10	0	.333	10th	—	—	—	—	—
1955	Harry Rabenhorst	Southeastern Conference	6	17	0	.261	4	11	0	.267	10th	—	—	—	—	—
1956	Harry Rabenhorst	Southeastern Conference	9	11	0	.450	7	9	0	.438	7th	—	—	—	—	—
1957	Ray Didier	Southeastern Conference	8	11	0	.421	6	8	0	.429	8th	—	—	—	—	—
1958	Ray Didier	Southeastern Conference	14	11	0	.560	9	6	0	.600	4th	—	—	—	—	—
1959	Ray Didier	Southeastern Conference	16	17	0	.485	7	9	0	.438	3rd (West)	—	—	—	NR	—
1960	Ray Didier	Southeastern Conference	15	14	0	.517	6	9	0	.400	4th (West)	—	—	—	NR	—
1961	Ray Didier	Southeastern Conference	20	5	0	.800	11	4	0	.733	1st (West)	—	—	—	22	—
1962	Ray Didier	Southeastern Conference	15	11	1	.574	8	7	1	.531	2nd (West)	—	—	—	NR	—
1963	Ray Didier	Southeastern Conference	16	10	0	.615	9	7	0	.563	2nd (West)	—	—	—	NR	—
1964	Jim Waldrop	Southeastern Conference	11	11	1	.500	5	7	0	.417	4th (West)	—	—	—	NR	—
1965	Jim Waldrop	Southeastern Conference	6	13	0	.316	4	11	0	.267	5th (West)	—	—	—	NR	—
1966	Jim Smith	Southeastern Conference	9	14	0	.391	4	12	0	.250	5th (West)	—	—	—	NR	—
1967	Jim Smith	Southeastern Conference	17	13	0	.567	9	8	0	.529	1st (West)	—	—	—	NR	—
1968	Jim Smith	Southeastern Conference	20	14	0	.588	10	8	0	.556	1st (West)	—	—	—	NR	—
1969	Jim Smith	Southeastern Conference	11	24	0	.314	4	13	0	.235	4th (West)	—	—	—	NR	—
1970	Jim Smith	Southeastern Conference	16	19	0	.457	5	11	0	.313	3rd (West)	—	—	—	NR	—
1971	Jim Smith	Southeastern Conference	20	16	0	.556	10	8	0	.556	2nd (West)	—	—	—	NR	—
1972	Jim Smith	Southeastern Conference	21	21	0	.500	7	11	0	.389	2nd (West)	—	—	—	NR	—
1973	Jim Smith	Southeastern Conference	18	13	0	.581	6	7	0	.462	2nd (West)	—	—	—	NR	—
1974	Jim Smith	Southeastern Conference	18	17	0	.514	7	10	0	.412	4th (West)	—	—	—	NR	—
1975	Jim Smith	Southeastern Conference	40	16	0	.714	19	3	0	.864	1st (West)	—	—	—	19	—
1976	Jim Smith	Southeastern Conference	19	23	0	.452	11	12	0	.478	3rd (West)	—	—	—	NR	—
1977	Jim Smith	Southeastern Conference	17	27	0	.386	4	15	0	.211	5th (West)	DNP	—	—	NR	—
1978	Jim Smith	Southeastern Conference	12	34	0	.261	6	18	0	.250	5th (West)	DNP	—	—	NR	—
1979	Jack Lamabe	Southeastern Conference	34	20	0	.630	13	7	0	.650	2nd (West)	3rd	—	—	NR	—
1980	Jack Lamabe	Southeastern Conference	23	19	0	.548	8	9	0	.471	4th (West)	DNP	—	—	NR	—
1981	Jack Lamabe	Southeastern Conference	23	30	0	.434	7	14	0	.333	4th (West)	DNP	—		NR	—
1982	Jack Lamabe	Southeastern Conference	26	25	0	.510	9	13	0	.409	4th (West)	DNP	—		NR	—
1983	Jack Lamabe	Southeastern Conference	28	21	0	.571	9	12	0	.429	4th (West)	DNP	—		NR	—
1984	Skip Bertman	Southeastern Conference	32	23	0	.582	12	12	0	.500	3rd (West)	DNP	—		NR	—
1985	Skip Bertman	Southeastern Conference	41	18	0	.695	17	7	0	.708	T-1st (West)	4th	Central Regional		24	—
1986	Skip Bertman	Southeastern Conference	55	14	0	.797	22	5	0	.815	1st	1st	College World Series		5	—
1987	Skip Bertman	Southeastern Conference	49	19	0	.721	12	10	0	.545	5th	2nd	College World Series		4	—
1988	Skip Bertman	Southeastern Conference	39	21	0	.650	16	11	0	.593	5th	5th	—		NR	—
1989	Skip Bertman	Southeastern Conference	55	17	0	.764	18	9	0	.667	2nd	4th	College World Series		4	—
1990	Skip Bertman	Southeastern Conference	54	19	0	.740	20	7	0	.741	1st	T-1st	College World Series		4	—
1991	Skip Bertman	Southeastern Conference	55	18	0	.753	19	7	0	.731	1st	2nd	National champions		1	—
1992	Skip Bertman	Southeastern Conference	50	16	0	.758	18	6	0	.750	1st	1st	South Regional		9	
1993	Skip Bertman	Southeastern Conference	53	17	1	.754	18	8	1	.685	1st	1st	National champions		1	
1994	Skip Bertman	Southeastern Conference	46	20	0	.697	21	6	0	.778	2nd	1st	College World Series		7	
1995	Skip Bertman	Southeastern Conference	47	18	0	.723	17	12	0	.586	5th	2nd	South Regional		18	
1996	Skip Bertman	Southeastern Conference	52	15	0	.776	20	10	0	.667	T-1st	5th	National champions		1	
1997	Skip Bertman	Southeastern Conference	57	13	0	.814	22	7	0	.759	1st	2nd	National champions		1	
1998	Skip Bertman	Southeastern Conference	48	19	0	.716	21	9	0	.700	2nd	5th	College World Series		3	
1999	Skip Bertman	Southeastern Conference	41	24	1	.629	18	11	1	.617	3rd	5th	Tuscaloosa Super Regional		14	
2000	Skip Bertman	Southeastern Conference	52	17	0	.754	19	10	0	.655	2nd	1st	National champions		1	
2001	Skip Bertman	Southeastern Conference	44	22	1	.664	18	12	0	.600	2nd	2nd	Metairie Super Regional		10	
2002	Smoke Laval	Southeastern Conference	44	22	0	.667	19	10	0	.655	4th	3rd	Houston Super Regional		11	
2003	Smoke Laval	Southeastern Conference	45	22	1	.669	20	9	1	.683	1st	2nd	College World Series		7	
2004	Smoke Laval	Southeastern Conference	46	19	0	.708	18	12	0	.600	3rd	7th	College World Series		8	
2005	Smoke Laval	Southeastern Conference	40	22	0	.645	18	12	0	.600	3rd	7th	Baton Rouge Regional		19	
2006	Smoke Laval	Southeastern Conference	35	24	0	.593	13	17	0	.433	8th	5th	—		NR	
2007	Paul Mainieri	Southeastern Conference	29	26	1	.527	12	17	1	.417	10th	DNP	—		NR	
2008	Paul Mainieri	Southeastern Conference	49	19	1	.717	18	11	1	.617	2nd	1st	College World Series		6	
2009	Paul Mainieri	Southeastern Conference	56	17	0	.767	20	10	0	.667	1st	1st	National champions		1	
2010	Paul Mainieri	Southeastern Conference	41	22	0	.651	14	16	0	.467	8th	1st	Los Angeles Regional		NR	
2011	Paul Mainieri	Southeastern Conference	36	20	0	.643	13	17	0	.433	9th	DNP	—		NR	
2012	Paul Mainieri	Southeastern Conference	47	18	0	.723	19	11	0	.633	1st	5th	NCAA Super Regional		NR	
2013	Paul Mainieri	Southeastern Conference	57	11	0	.838	23	7	0	.767	2nd	1st	College World Series		4	
2014	Paul Mainieri	Southeastern Conference	46	16	1	.738	17	11	1	.603	3rd	1st	Baton Rouge Regional		22	
2015	Paul Mainieri	Southeastern Conference	54	12	0	.818	21	8	0	.724	1st	3rd	College World Series		5	
2016	Paul Mainieri	Southeastern Conference	45	21	0	.682	19	11	0	.633	5th	3rd	Baton Rouge Super Regional		12	
2017	Paul Mainieri	Southeastern Conference	52	20	0	.722	21	9	0	.700	1st	1st	College World Series Runner-up		2	
2018	Paul Mainieri	Southeastern Conference	39	27	0	.591	15	15	0	.500	8th	2nd	Corvallis Regional		NR	
2019	Paul Mainieri	Southeastern Conference	40	26	0	.606	17	13	0	.567	5th	4th	Baton Rouge Super Regional		14	
2020	Paul Mainieri	Southeastern Conference	12	5	0	.706	0	0	0	–	Season canceled on 12 March due the COVID-19 pandemic					
2021	Paul Mainieri	Southeastern Conference	38	25	0	.603	13	17	0	.433	9th	9th	Knoxville Super Regional	21	15	18
2022	Jay Johnson	Southeastern Conference	40	22	0	.645	17	13	0	.567	4th	5th	Hattiesburg Regional	24	23	22
2023	Jay Johnson	Southeastern Conference	54	17	0	.761	19	10	0	.655	3rd	5th	National champions	1	1	1
2024	Jay Johnson	Southeastern Conference	43	22	0	.662	13	17	0	.433	T–7th	2nd	Chapel Hill Regional			24
2025	Jay Johnson	Southeastern Conference	53	15	0	.779	19	11	0	.633	T–3rd	3rd	National champions	1		1
2026	Jay Johnson	Southeastern Conference	30	28	0	.517	9	21	0	.300	14th	9th	—			
Total			2,711	1,685	31	.616	1893–2026 (only includes regular season games)									
Total			194	83	0	.700	1947–2026 (only includes postseason games)									
Total			2,905	1,767	31	.621	1893–2026 (all games)									

=== Notes ===
Sources:
