= Cusachs =

Cusachs is a surname. Notable people with the surname include:

- C. V. Cusachs, American baseball coach
- Josep Cusachs (1851–1908), Spanish soldier and painter
