= Verge Ausberry =

American college sports administrator

Current position
- Title: Athletic director
- Team: LSU
- Conference: SEC

Biographical details
- Born: July 1969 (age 57); New Iberia, Louisiana, U.S.
- Education: Louisiana State University (BS) (MS)

Administrative career (AD unless noted)
- 2001–2005: LSU (associate AD)
- 2006–2014: LSU (senior associate AD)
- 2015–2018: LSU (deputy AD)
- 2019–2024: LSU (executive deputy AD)
- 2025–present: LSU

Verge Samuel Ausberry II (born 1969) is an American college athletics administrator and former football player who has served as the Director of Athletics at Louisiana State University (LSU) since 2025.

== Early life and education ==
Ausberry was born in New Iberia, Louisiana and attended New Iberia Senior High School where he was an all-state linebacker. Ausberry attended Louisiana State University (LSU) from 1986-1990, where he was a two-year captain for the LSU Tigers football team, winning two SEC championships. Ausberry graduated from LSU in 1990 with a Bachelor of Science in Education and Masters of Education in 1992.

== Career ==
Ausberry has spent his entire career at LSU, beginning in 1991 as an intern in the athletic department's compliance office. Ausberry worked for seven years in the school's athletic academic center before transitioning to be a fundraiser for the Tiger Athletic Foundation. In 2001, recently hired athletic director Skip Bertman hired Ausberry as an associate Athletic Director. Following promotions in 2006 and 2015, he was named the school's executive deputy director of athletics and executive director of external relations in 2019. In the role Ausberry oversaw football, women's basketball, gymnastics and led the department's government relations.

=== Athletic Director ===
Ausberry was named the DIrector of Athletics at LSU in 2025, following the firing of Scott Woodward. In his first month as athletic director, Ausberry made national headlines when he hired Lane Kiffin as the school's head football coach, with Kiffin leaving rival Ole Miss to take the job. In 2026, Ausberry hired former LSU coach Will Wade away from NC State to be the school's men's basketball coach.

== Personal life ==
Ausberry lives in Baton Rouge, Louisiana. His son Jaiden Ausberry plays college football at Notre Dame.
