= Lane Mestepey =

- Pitcher
- Born: January 14, 1982 (age 44); Zachary, Louisiana
- Bats: left Throws: left

Rogers Lane Mestepey Jr. is a former college baseball pitcher at LSU.

He was ranked among the top players for LSU during the 2000s and ranks second in school history in total victories.

== Playing career ==
=== College ===
Mestepey spent four years pitching at Louisiana State University, playing from 2001 to 2005. Compared to Hall of Fame Greg Maddux at one point, Mestepey was the first pitcher in LSU history to win 10 or more games each of his first two seasons with the club. In his first season, he was 11–3 with a 3.75 ERA and also led the SEC in victories. He is notable for winning the 2001 Louisville Slugger Freshman Player of the Year honor alongside infielder Jamie D'Antona.

In his second season, he was 11–5 with a 2.60 ERA. He missed 2003 after having shoulder surgery. In 2004, his third campaign, he was the school's top pitcher and went 7–4 with a 3.51 mark and in 2005, his senior year, he was 7–8 with a 4.94 mark. He tossed 17 complete games in his career.

== Early life ==
Mestepey was born on January 14, 1982, and attended Central Private High School.
