= Baseball America College Coach of the Year =

Baseball America College Coach of the Year Award
- Awarded for: Best coach in college baseball
- Country: United States
- Presented by: Baseball America

History
- First award: 1981
- Most recent: Kevin Schnall, Coastal Carolina
- Website: Baseball America Awards

The Baseball America College Coach of the Year Award is an award given by Baseball America to the best college baseball coach of the year. The award has been given annually since 1981.

== Winners ==
Key
Year	Links to the article about the corresponding NCAA Division I baseball season
Coach (X)	Name of the Coach and number of times they had won the award at that point
School	The Coach's college when he won the award
†	Member of the National College Baseball Hall of Fame

Winners
Year	Coach	School	Ref
1981	Ron Fraser^{†}	Miami	
1982	Gene Stephenson^{†}	Wichita State	
1983	Barry Shollenberger	Alabama	
1984	Augie Garrido	Cal State Fullerton	
1985	Ron Polk^{†}	Mississippi State	
1986	Skip Bertman^{†}	LSU	
1986	Dave Snow	Loyola Marymount	
1987	Mark Marquess	Stanford	
1988	Jim Brock^{†}	Arizona State	
1989	Dave Snow (2)	Long Beach State	
1990	Steve Webber	Georgia	
1991	Jim Hendry	Creighton	
1992	Andy Lopez	Pepperdine	
1993	Gene Stephenson^{†} (2)	Wichita State	
1994	Jim Morris	Miami	
1995	Rod Delmonico	Tennessee	
1996	Skip Bertman^{†} (2)	LSU	
1997	Jim Wells	Alabama	
1998	Pat Murphy	Arizona State	
1999	Wayne Graham^{†}	Rice	
2000	Ray Tanner	South Carolina	
2001	Dave Van Horn	Nebraska	
2002	Augie Garrido (2)	Texas	
2003	George Horton	Cal State Fullerton	
2004	David Perno	Georgia	
2005	Rick Jones	Tulane	
2006	Pat Casey	Oregon State	
2007	Dave Serrano	UC Irvine	
2008	Mike Fox	North Carolina	
2009	Paul Mainieri	LSU	
2010	Ray Tanner (2)	South Carolina	
2011	Kevin O'Sullivan	Florida	
2012	Mike Martin	Florida State	
2013	John Savage	UCLA	
2014	Tim Corbin	Vanderbilt	
2015	Brian O'Connor	Virginia	
2016	Jim Schlossnagle	TCU	
2017	Dan McDonnell	Louisville	
2018	David Pierce	Texas	
2019	Mike Martin	Florida State	
2020	Not Awarded	NCAA Baseball Season Canceled	
2021	Chris Lemonis	Mississippi State	
2022	Mike Bianco	Ole Miss	
2023	Jay Johnson	LSU	
2024	Tony Vitello	Tennessee	
2025	Kevin Schnall	Coastal Carolina	
2026	Dan Fitzgerald	Kansas	

== See also ==
- List of college baseball awards
- Baseball awards#U.S. college baseball
- College Baseball Hall of Fame
