= Southeastern Conference Baseball Coach of the Year =

- Awarded for: the most outstanding baseball head coach in the Southeastern Conference
- Country: United States
- First award: 1933–present
- Currently held by: Jim Schlossnagle, Texas

The Southeastern Conference Baseball Coach of the Year is an award given to the most outstanding baseball head coach in the Southeastern Conference (SEC), as chosen by the league's head coaches.

== Key ==
| | Awarded one of the following National Coach of the Year awards that year: Collegiate Baseball Coach of the Year (CB); Baseball America Coach of the Year (BA) |
| Coach (X) | Denotes the number of times the coach had been awarded the Coach of the Year award at that point |
| * | Elected to the National College Baseball Hall of Fame as a coach but is no longer active |
| *^ | Active coach who has been elected to the National College Baseball Hall of Fame (as a coach) |
| Conf. W–L | Conference win–loss record for that season |
| Conf. St.^{T} | Conference standing at year's end (^{T}denotes a tie) |
| Overall W–L | Overall win–loss record for that season |
| Season^{‡} | Team won the Men's College World Series |

== Winners ==
| Season | Coach | School | National Coach of the Year Awards | Conf. W–L | Conf. St. | Overall W–L | Reference |
|---|---|---|---|---|---|---|---|
| 1933 | W.P. White | Georgia | — | 8–1 | 1 | 12–3 | |
| 1934 | Jennings B. Whitworth | Alabama | — | 13–3 | 1 | 13–5 | |
| 1935 | Tilden Campbell | Alabama | — | 8–2 | 1 | 12–2 | |
| 1936 | Tilden Campbell (2) | Alabama | — | 7–3–1 | 1 | 10–3–1 | |
| 1937 | Dell Morgan | Auburn | — | 8–1 | 1 | 8–1 | |
| 1938 | Tilden Campbell (3) | Alabama | — | 10–1 | 1 | 13–2 | |
| 1939 | Harry Rabenhorst | LSU | — | 10–2 | 1 | 22–6 | |
| 1940 | Tilden Campbell (4) | Alabama | — | 12–1 | 1 | 12–1 | |
| 1941 | Tilden Campbell (5) | Alabama | — | 13–2 | 1 | 19–2–1 | |
| 1942 | Tilden Campbell (6) | Alabama | — | 9–1 | 1 | 10–2 | |
| 1943 | Red Swanson | LSU | — | 11–3 | 1 | 13–8 | |
| 1944 | No competition due to World War II | | | | | | |
| 1945 | No competition due to World War II | | | | | | |
| 1946 | Harry Rabenhorst (2) | LSU | — | 11–3 | 1 | 11–3 | |
| 1947 | Tilden Campbell (7) | Alabama | — | 11–3 | 1 | 20–7 | |
| 1948 | R.P Patty | Mississippi State | — | 12–5 | 1 (Western) | 17–8 | |
| 1949 | R.P. Patty (2) | Mississippi State | — | 13–3 | 1 (Western) | 19–6 | |
| 1950 | Tilden Campbell (8) | Alabama | — | 12–4 | 1 (Eastern) | 22–12 | |
| 1951 | S. W. Anderson | Tennessee | — | 16–1 | 1 | 20–3 | |
| 1952 | Dave Fuller | Florida | — | 12–2 | 1 | 21–4-2 | |
| 1953 | Jim Whatley | Georgia | — | 12–4 | 1 (Eastern) | 23–5 | |
| 1954 | Jim Whatley | Georgia | — | 11–4 | 1 (Eastern) | 16–09 | |
| 1955 | Tilden Campbell (9) | Alabama | — | 16–2 | 1 (Western) | 23–6 | |
| 1956 | Dave Fuller (2) | Florida | — | 13–3 | 1 (Eastern) | 13–11 | |
| 1957 | Joe Pittard | Georgia Tech | — | 13–3 | 1 (Eastern) | 18–8–1 | |
| 1958 | Joe Connally | Auburn | — | 12–3 | 1 (Eastern) | 17–8 | |
| 1959 | Tom Swayze | Ole Miss | — | 10–3 | 1 (Western) | 18–6 | |
| 1960 | Tom Swayze (2) | Ole Miss | — | 12–2 | 1 (Western) | 22–3 | |
| 1961 | Ray Didier | LSU | — | 11–4 | 1 (Western) | 20–5 | |
| 1962 | Dave Fuller (3) | Florida | — | 14–3 | 1 (Eastern) | 14–3 | |
| 1963 | Paul Nix | Auburn | — | 15–3 | 1 (Eastern) | 17–8 | |
| 1964 | Tom Swayze (3) | Ole Miss | — | 11–1 | 1 (Western) | 19–04 | |
| 1965 | Paul Gregory | Mississippi State | — | 11–4 | 1 (Western) | 13–7 | |
| 1966 | Paul Gregory (2) | Mississippi State | — | 11–4 | 1 (Western) | 17–09 | |
| 1967 | Paul Nix (2) | Auburn | — | 15–2 | 1 (Eastern) | 27–07 | |
| 1968 | Joe Sewell | Alabama | — | 10–8 | 1 (Western) | 22–11 | |
| 1969 | Tom Swayze (4) | Ole Miss | — | 11–5 | 1 (Western) | 27–15 | |
| 1970 | Paul Gregory (3) | Mississippi State | — | 11–4 | 1 (Western) | 11–4 | |
| 1971 | Paul Gregory (4) | Mississippi State | — | 13–5 | 1 (Western) | 32–12 | |
| 1972 | Jake Gibbs | Ole Miss | — | 15–3 | 1 (Western) | 28–16 | |
| 1973 | Larry Schmittou | Vanderbilt | — | 13–3 | 1 (Eastern) | 36–16 | |
| 1974 | Larry Schmittou (2) | Vanderbilt | — | 11–4 | 1 (Eastern) | 37–22–1 | |
| 1975 | Jim Smith | LSU | — | 19–3 | 1 (Western) | 40–16 | |
| 1976 | Paul Nix (3) | Auburn | — | 12–7 | 1 (Western) | 37–15 | |
| 1977 | Jake Gibbs (2) | Ole Miss | — | 15–9 | 1 (Western) | 40–18 | |
| 1978 | Paul Nix (4) | Auburn | — | 15–8 | 1 (Western) | 33–21 | |
| 1979 | Ron Polk* | Mississippi State | — | 17–2 | 1 (Western) | 48–12 | |
| 1980 | Roy Mewbourne | Vanderbilt | — | 13–9 | 2 (Eastern) | 34–21–1 | |
| 1981 | Jack Rhine | Florida | — | 16–7 | 1 (Eastern) | 42–17 | |
| 1982 | Jack Rhine (2) | Florida | — | 14–8 | 1 (Eastern) | 34–24–1 | |
| 1983 | Barry Shollenberger | Alabama | BA | 14–7 | 1 (Western) | 46–11 | |
| 1984 | Joe Arnold | Florida | — | 18–4 | 1 (Eastern) | 43–161 | |
| 1985 | Ron Polk* (2) | Mississippi State | BA | 16–8 | 1 (Western) | 50–15 | |
| 1986 | Skip Bertman* | LSU | BA | 22–5 | 1 (Western) | 49–09 | |
| 1987 | Steve Webber | Georgia | — | 18–8 | 1 (Eastern) | 42–21 | |
| 1988 | Joe Arnold (2) | Florida | — | 21–6 | 1 (Eastern) | 48–19–1 | |
| 1989 | Ron Polk* (3) | Mississippi State | — | 20–5 | 1 (Western) | 54–14 | |
| 1990 | Skip Bertman* (2) | LSU | — | 20–7 | 1 (Western) | 54–19^{‡} | |
| 1991 | Skip Bertman* (3) | LSU | CB | 19–7 | 1 (Western) | 55–18^{‡} | |
| 1992 | Skip Bertman* (4) | LSU | — | 18–6 | 1 (Western) | 50–16 | |
| 1993 | Skip Bertman* (5) | LSU | CB | 18–8–1 | 1 (Western) | 53–17–1^{‡} | |
| 1994 | Rod Delmonico | Tennessee | — | 24–5 | 1 (Eastern) | 52–14 | |
| 1995 | Rod Delmonico (2) | Tennessee | — | 22–8 | 1 (Eastern) | 54–16 | |
| 1996 | Skip Bertman* (6); Andy Lopez; Jim Wells | LSU; Florida; Alabama | BA, CB; CB — | 20–10; 20–10; 20–10 | 1 (Western); 1 (Eastern)^{T} 1 (Eastern)^{T} | 52–15^{‡} 50–18; 50–19 | |
| 1997 | Skip Bertman* (7) | LSU | CB | 22–7 | 1 (Western) | 57–13^{‡} | |
| 1998 | Ray Tanner | South Carolina | — | 19–10 | 2 (Eastern) | 44–18 | |
| 1999 | Norm DeBriyn | Arkansas | — | 22–8 | 1 (Western) | 42–23 | |
| 2000 | Ray Tanner (2) | South Carolina | BA | 25–5 | 1 (Eastern) | 56–10 | |
| 2001 | Ron Polk* (4) | Georgia | — | 20–10 | 1 (Eastern) | 47–22 | |
| 2002 | Jim Wells (2) | Alabama | — | 20–10 | 1 (Western) | 51–15 | |
| 2003 | Smoke Laval | LSU | — | 20–9–1 | 1 (Western) | 45–22–1 | |
| 2004 | Dave Van Horn; David Perno | Arkansas; Georgia | — BA | 19–11; 19–11 | 1 (Western); 1 (Eastern) | 45–24; 45–23 | |
| 2005 | Pat McMahon | Florida | — | 20–10 | 1 (Eastern) | 48–23 | |
| 2006 | John Cohen | Kentucky | — | 20–10 | 1 (Eastern) | 44–17 | |
| 2007 | Tim Corbin | Vanderbilt | — | 22–8 | 1 (Eastern) | 54–13 | |
| 2008 | David Perno (2) | Georgia | — | 20–9–1 | 1 (Eastern) | 45–25–1 | |
| 2009 | Paul Mainieri | LSU | BA, CB | 20–10 | 1 (Western) | 56–17^{‡} | |
| 2010 | Kevin O'Sullivan | Florida | — | 22–8 | 1 (Eastern) | 43–21 | |
| 2011 | Ray Tanner (3) | South Carolina | CB | 22–8 | 1 (Eastern) | 55–14^{‡} | |
| 2012 | Gary Henderson | Kentucky | — | 45–18 | 3 (Eastern) | 45–18 | |
| 2013 | Tim Corbin (2) | Vanderbilt | — | 26–3 | 1 (Eastern) | 54–12 | |
| 2014 | Kevin O'Sullivan (2) | Florida | — | 21–9 | 1 (Eastern) | 40–23 | |
| 2015 | Paul Mainieri (2) | LSU | BA, CB | 20–10 | 1 (Western) | 56–17 | |
| 2016 | John Cohen (2) | Mississippi State | - | 21–9 | 1 (Western) | 46–16–1 | |
| 2017 | Nick Mingione | Kentucky | - | 19–11 | 2 (Eastern) | 43–23 | |
| 2018 | Kevin O'Sullivan (3) | Florida | - | 20–10 | 1 (Eastern) | 49–21 | |
| 2019 | Tim Corbin (3) | Vanderbilt | - | 23–7 | 1 (Eastern) | 49–10 | |
| 2021 | Dave Van Horn (2) | Arkansas | - | 22–8 | 1 (West) | 50–13 | |
| 2022 | Tony Vitello | Tennessee | – | 22–5 | 1 (East) | 57–9 | |
| 2023 | Dave Van Horn (3) | Arkansas | – | 20–10 | 1 (West) | 43–18 | |
| 2024 | Nick Mingione (2) | Kentucky | – | 22–8 | 1 (East) | 39–12 | |
| 2025 | Jim Schlossnagle | Texas | – | 22–8 | 1 | – | |
| 2026 | Wes Johnson | Georgia | – | | | | |

== Winners by school ==
| School (year joined) | Winners | Years |
|---|---|---|
| LSU (1932) | 15 | 1939, 1943, 1946, 1961, 1975, 1986, 1990, 1991, 1992, 1993, 1996, 1997, 2003, 2009, 2015 |
| Alabama (1932) | 14 | 1934, 1935, 1936, 1938, 1940, 1941, 1942, 1947, 1950, 1955, 1968, 1983, 1996, 2002 |
| Florida (1932) | 12 | 1952, 1956, 1962, 1981, 1982, 1984, 1988, 1996, 2005, 2010, 2014, 2018 |
| Mississippi State (1932) | 10 | 1948, 1949, 1965, 1966, 1970, 1971, 1979, 1985, 1989, 2016 |
| Georgia (1932) | 8 | 1933, 1953, 1954, 1987, 2001, 2004, 2008, 2026 |
| Auburn (1932) | 6 | 1937, 1958, 1963, 1967, 1976, 1978 |
| Ole Miss (1932) | 6 | 1959, 1960, 1964, 1969, 1972, 1977 |
| Vanderbilt (1932) | 6 | 1973, 1974, 1980, 2007, 2013, 2019 |
| Arkansas (1991) | 4 | 1999, 2004, 2021, 2023 |
| Kentucky (1932) | 4 | 2006, 2012, 2017, 2024 |
| Tennessee (1932) | 4 | 1951, 1994, 1995, 2022 |
| South Carolina (1991) | 3 | 1998, 2000, 2011 |
| Georgia Tech^{a} (1932) | 1 | 1957 |
| Texas (2024) | 1 | 2025 |

== Footnotes ==
- ^{a} Georgia Tech left the Southeastern Conference in 1964.
- ^{b} Tulane left the Southeastern Conference in 1966.

== See also ==
- Southeastern Conference Baseball Player of the Year
- Southeastern Conference Baseball Pitcher of the Year
- Southeastern Conference Baseball Freshman of the Year
