= Paul Mainieri =

American baseball player & coach (born 1957)

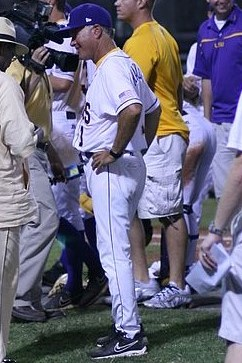
- Mainieri in 2019

Biographical details
- Born: August 29, 1957 (age 69); Morgantown, West Virginia, U.S.

Playing career
- 1976: LSU
- 1977: Miami-Dade North CC
- 1978–1979: New Orleans
- 1979: Niagara Falls Pirates
- Position: Second base

Coaching career (HC unless noted)
- 1983–1988: St. Thomas (FL)
- 1989–1994: Air Force
- 1995–2006: Notre Dame
- 2007–2021: LSU
- 2024–2026: South Carolina

Head coaching record
- Overall: 1,545–817–8 (.654)
- Tournaments: 71–43

Accomplishments and honors

Championships
- College World Series (2009); 4 SEC (2009, 2012, 2015, 2017); 6 SEC tournament (2008–2010, 2013, 2014, 2017); 4 Big East (1999, 2001, 2002, 2006); 5 Big East tournament (2002–2006)

Awards
- NCBWA National Coach of the Year (2015); Skip Bertman Award (2015); Baseball America Coach of the Year (2009); Collegiate Baseball Coach of the Year (2009); 2× SEC Coach of the Year (2009, 2015); Big East Coach of the Year (2001)

Paul Mainieri (born August 29, 1957) is a former American college baseball coach. He played college baseball at LSU, Miami-Dade CC and New Orleans before pursuing a professional baseball career. He then served as the head coach of the St. Thomas Bobcats (1983–1988), Air Force Falcons (1989–1994), Notre Dame Fighting Irish (1995–2006), LSU Tigers (2007–2021), and South Carolina Gamecocks (2024-2026). Mainieri coached LSU to the 2009 College World Series Championship.

== Playing career ==
Mainieri graduated from Christopher Columbus High School in Miami. He started his college baseball playing career in 1976 at LSU. He played for one season, earning a letter, before transferring to Miami-Dade North Community College to play for his father, Demie Mainieri. After one year he transferred to the University of New Orleans where he played for two years and helped the team win two Sun Belt Conference titles and earn an appearance in the 1979 NCAA Division I baseball tournament. In 1978, he played collegiate summer baseball with the Wareham Gatemen of the Cape Cod Baseball League, and was named a league all-star.

Mainieri completed his undergraduate degree requirement at Florida International University in 1980, earning a B.S. in physical education. He played two years of minor league baseball and earned a M.S. in sports administration from St. Thomas University in 1982.

== Coaching career ==
=== St. Thomas ===
Mainieri began his coaching career in Florida as the head coach of St. Thomas University in 1983. In six seasons, his team went 179–121–2, and Mainieri became the winningest coach in St. Thomas History. His No. 1 jersey was retired by the university in February 2012. In 2013, the new field at St. Thomas University was named in his honor. The Bobcats' new field is called Paul Demie Mainieri Field at Frank R. Esposito Stadium. Paul Mainieri asked the university to include his middle name, Demie, in the naming of the field because it is the same name as his father's first name. Both Mainieris have deep roots with St. Thomas, and recently became the first father-son duo to be elected to the American Baseball Coaches Association Hall of Fame.

Mainieri was inducted into the St. Thomas Hall of Fame on November 1, 2009. Mainieri became the sixth person to be inducted into the St. Thomas Hall of Fame, joining Ken Stibler, Marinka Bisceglia, Manny Mantrana, Laura Courtley-Todd and John Batule.

=== Air Force ===
He moved on to the United States Air Force Academy in 1989, where he would also remain for six seasons. He became the second-winningest coach in Air Force history posting a mark of 152–158.

=== Notre Dame ===
Moving to the Notre Dame Fighting Irish in 1995, Mainieri turned the Fighting Irish into a perennial postseason contender winning the Big East tournament a record 5 straight seasons, making the NCAA tournament 9 out of 12 seasons, and leading the Irish to one College World Series appearance in 2002. He won the 2001 Big East Coach of the Year award. In total, Mainieri posted a .714 winning percentage going 533–213–3 in twelve seasons.

=== LSU ===
Mainieri replaced Smoke Laval at the end of the LSU Tigers' 2006 season. In the 2007 season, LSU finished 29–26–1 and did not reach the NCAA tournament.

40 games into the 2008 season, the Tigers were again struggling with a 23–16–1 record. However, the team then went on a Southeastern Conference record 23-game win streak and moved on to claim the 2008 SEC Tournament championship. Under Mainieri's leadership, the team swept the Baton Rouge Regional bracket of the NCAA baseball post-season and won their first Super-Regional since 2004. UC Irvine ended the streak in the first game of the Super Regional, defeating LSU 11–5, but LSU won the next two games and reached the 2008 College World Series. It was LSU's first College World Series appearance since 2004 and they recorded their first win since their CWS championship in 2000.

Mainieri's Tigers entered the 2009 season as the favorites to win the SEC, and were the preseason No. 1 team in some national polls. During the season, the Tigers won the SEC regular season title, the 2009 SEC Tournament championship, and reached the 2009 College World Series as the No. 3 national seed. Mainieri then led LSU to the CWS Finals against Texas. The Tigers won the first game 7–6 in 11 innings, lost the second 5–1, but won the national championship defeating the Longhorns 11–4 in the final game. The Tigers finished the season with a 56–17 record. Mainieri received the 2009 Coach of the Year award from Collegiate Baseball Newspaper and the 2009 Coach of the Year award by Baseball America. Rivals.com also named Mainieri the 2009 National Coach of the Year.

The 2009 title was the sixth in LSU baseball history, tying Texas for the second most national championships in college baseball history, and Mainieri joined Skip Bertman as the only LSU baseball coaches to win a national championship.

In 2015, Mainieri received the National Coach of the Year award from the National Collegiate Baseball Writers Association and the Skip Bertman Award presented by the College Baseball Foundation. During the 2017 season, LSU played Florida in a best-of-three series to determine the winner of the 2017 College World Series. Florida swept LSU and the Tigers finished as College World Series runner-up. Mainieri announced his retirement from coaching after the conclusion of the 2021 season.

=== South Carolina ===
Paul Mainieri was named the 31st head coach of the South Carolina Gamecocks baseball program on June 11, 2024. In the 2025 season, the Gamecocks compiled a 28–29 (6–24 SEC) record and missed the NCAA tournament. After a 12–11 start to the 2026 season, Mainieri and South Carolina agreed to part ways on March 21, 2026.

== Head coaching record ==
Record table
Season	Team	Overall	Conference	Standing	Postseason
St. Thomas Bobcats (Sunshine State Conference) (1983–1988)
1983	St. Thomas	19–25–1			
1984	St. Thomas	37–14			
1985	St. Thomas	32–21			
1986	St. Thomas	23–24			
1987	St. Thomas	35–21			
1988	St. Thomas	33–16–1			
St. Thomas:		179–121–2 (.596)			
Air Force Falcons (Western Athletic Conference) (1989–1994)
1989	Air Force	27–27	13–13	5th	
1990	Air Force	26–34	7–21	7th	
1991	Air Force	22–27	1–20	8th	
1992	Air Force	23–24	5–20	7th	
1993	Air Force	28–22	5–16	10th	
1994	Air Force	26–24	7–15	10th	
Air Force:		152–158 (.490)	38–105 (.266)		
Notre Dame Fighting Irish (Big East Conference) (1995–2006)
1995	Notre Dame	40–21	11–4	2nd	
1996	Notre Dame	44–18	13–7	6th	NCAA Regional
1997	Notre Dame	41–19	15–6	3rd	
1998	Notre Dame	41–17	15–4	2nd	
1999	Notre Dame	43–18	20–5	1st	NCAA Regional
2000	Notre Dame	46–18	18–7	2nd	NCAA Regional
2001	Notre Dame	49–13–1	22–4	1st	NCAA Regional
2002	Notre Dame	50–18	18–8	1st	College World Series
2003	Notre Dame	45–18	16–7	3rd	NCAA Regional
2004	Notre Dame	51–12	20–6	1st	NCAA Regional
2005	Notre Dame	38–24–1	14–9–1	3rd	NCAA Regional
2006	Notre Dame	45–17–1	14–9–1	3rd	NCAA Regional
Notre Dame:		533–213–3 (.714)	196–76–2 (.719)		
LSU Tigers (Southeastern Conference) (2007–2021)
2007	LSU	29–26–1	12–17–1	5th (West)	
2008	LSU	49–19–1	18–11–1	1st (West)	College World Series
2009	LSU	56–17	20–10	1st (West)	College World Series champions
2010	LSU	41–22	14–16	5th (West)	NCAA Regional
2011	LSU	36–20	13–17	T–5th (West)	
2012	LSU	47–18	19–11	1st (West)	NCAA Super Regional
2013	LSU	57–11	23–7	1st (West)	College World Series
2014	LSU	46–16–1	17–11–1	2nd (West)	NCAA Regional
2015	LSU	54–12	21–8	1st (West)	College World Series
2016	LSU	45–21	19–11	3rd (West)	NCAA Super Regional
2017	LSU	52–20	21–9	1st (West)	College World Series Runner-Up
2018	LSU	39–27	15–15	4th (West)	NCAA Regional
2019	LSU	40–26	17–13	3rd (West)	NCAA Super Regional
2020	LSU	12–5	0–0	6th (West)	Season canceled due to COVID-19
2021	LSU	38–25	13–17	4th (West)	NCAA Super Regional
LSU:		641–283–3 (.693)	242–175–3 (.580)		
South Carolina Gamecocks (Southeastern Conference) (2025–2026)
2025	South Carolina	28–29	6–24	15th	
2026	South Carolina	12–11	0–4		
South Carolina:		40–40 (.500)	6–28 (.176)		
Total:		1,545–817–8 (.654)			
National champion Postseason invitational champion Conference regular season champion Conference regular season and conference tournament champion Division regular season champion Division regular season and conference tournament champion Conference tournament champion

=== NCAA tournament ===
Year	School	Record	Winning %	Notes
1996	Notre Dame	1–2	.333	Eliminated by Virginia in South I Regional
1999	Notre Dame	1–2	.333	Eliminated by Michigan in South Bend Regional
2000	Notre Dame	3–2	.600	Eliminated by Mississippi St. in Starkville Regional Finals
2001	Notre Dame	3–2	.600	Eliminated by Florida International in South Bend Regional Finals
2002	Notre Dame	5–3	.625	Won South Bend Regional & Tallahassee Super Regional; College World Series (5th Place)
2003	Notre Dame	2–2	.500	Eliminated by Cal St. Fullerton in Fullerton Regional Finals
2004	Notre Dame	2–2	.500	Eliminated by Arizona in South Bend Regional Finals
2005	Notre Dame	2–2	.500	Eliminated by Florida in Gainesville Regional Finals
2006	Notre Dame	0–2	.000	Eliminated by Kentucky in Lexington Regional
2008	LSU	6–3	.667	Won Baton Rouge Regional & Super Regional; College World Series (5th Place)
2009	LSU	10–1	.909	Won Baton Rouge Regional & Super Regional; College World Series champions
2010	LSU	1–2	.333	Eliminated by UC Irvine in Los Angeles Regional
2012	LSU	4–2	.667	Won Baton Rouge Regional. Eliminated by Stony Brook in Baton Rouge Super Regional
2013	LSU	5–2	.714	Won Baton Rouge Regional & Super Regional; College World Series (7th Place)
2014	LSU	2–2	.500	Eliminated by University of Houston in Baton Rouge Regional
2015	LSU	6–2	.750	Won Baton Rouge Regional & Super Regional; College World Series (5th Place)
2016	LSU	3–3	.500	Won Baton Rouge Regional. Eliminated by Coastal Carolina in Baton Rouge Super Regional
2017	LSU	9–3	.750	Won Baton Rouge Regional & Super Regional; College World Series Runner-Up
2018	LSU	2–2	.500	Eliminated by Oregon State in Corvallis Regional
2019	LSU	3–2	.600	Won Baton Rouge Regional. Eliminated by Florida State in Baton Rouge Super Regional
2021	LSU	4–1	.800	Won Eugene Regional. Eliminated by Tennessee in Knoxville Super Regional
Totals		75–44	.630	21 Regionals (Won 10); 10 Super Regionals (Won 6); 6 College World Series (1 Championship)

== See also ==
- List of current NCAA Division I baseball coaches
- List of college baseball career coaching wins leaders
