= Jim Waldrop =

American baseball coach

Biographical details
- Education: Southeastern Louisiana University

Coaching career (HC unless noted)
- 1964–1965: LSU
- 1967–1972: Southeastern Louisiana

Head coaching record
- Overall: 98–147–3

James Waldrop was the head baseball coach of the LSU Tigers baseball team from 1964 to 1965 and Southeastern Louisiana Lions baseball team from 1967 to 1972.

During his 9 seasons as head coach, he coached in 248 games, winning 98, losing 147 with 3 ties for a (.401) winning percentage. Waldrop's record at LSU was 17–24–1 (9-18 SEC) over two seasons. His record at Southeastern Louisiana was 81–123–2 (19-17 conference record) over 7 seasons.

Waldrop also served as an assistant football coach for the Southeastern Louisiana Lions football team.

== Playing career ==
Waldrop was an All-Conference guard for the Southeastern Louisiana Lions basketball team. He was also a member of the Southeastern Louisiana Lions football team. In 1940, he scored a then-school single game record three touchdowns in a game. Waldrop later played minor league baseball.
