= J. Phillips (baseball) =

American baseball coach

Coaching career (HC unless noted)
- 1907: LSU

Head coaching record
- Overall: 11–7

J. Phillips was the head baseball coach of the LSU Tigers baseball team in 1907. During his one season as head coach, he finished the season with an 11–7 record and (.611) winning percentage.
