= E. B. Young =

American baseball coach

Playing career
- 1893: LSU

Coaching career (HC unless noted)
- 1893: LSU

Head coaching record
- Overall: 1–0

E. B. Young was the head baseball coach and captain of the LSU Tigers baseball team in 1893.

Young was the first head coach in the history of the LSU Baseball program. During his one season as head coach, he finished the season with a 1–0 record and (1.000) winning percentage.

Prior to the only game of 1893 season, Young selected the materials for the uniforms to be used in the May 13th game. He chose Old Gold and Purple and it was the first time a team from LSU wore the colors that were later adopted as the official colors of the university.
