= L. P. Piper =

American college baseball coach

Coaching career (HC unless noted)
- 1900–1901: LSU

Head coaching record
- Overall: 8–6–1

Louis P. Piper was the head baseball coach of the LSU Tigers baseball team from 1900 to 1901.

During his two seasons as head coach, he finished the season with an overall 8–6–1 record and (.567) winning percentage. During the 1900 season, the Tigers finished with a 2–3–1 record. The 1901 team finished with a record of 6–3. Prior to coaching, Piper played for the New Orleans Pelicans and Detroit Tigers (then a member of the Western League).
