= E. A. Scott =

American baseball coach

Coaching career (HC unless noted)
- 1897: LSU

Head coaching record
- Overall: 3–3

E. A. Scott was the head baseball coach of the LSU Tigers baseball team in 1897. Scott was the second coach in the history of the LSU Baseball program.

During his one season as head coach, he finished the season with a 3–3 record and (.500) winning percentage.
