= Jim Smith (baseball coach) =

American baseball coach

Biographical details
- Born: c. 1931
- Died: January 17, 2001 (aged 69); Baton Rouge, Louisiana, U.S.

Coaching career (HC unless noted)
- 1966–1978: LSU

Head coaching record
- Overall: 238–251
- Tournaments: 1–2

Accomplishments and honors

Championships
- 1 SEC (1975)

Awards
- SEC Coach of the Year (1975)

Jim Smith (c. 1931 – January 17, 2001) was the head baseball coach of the LSU Tigers baseball team from 1966 to 1978. Through 13 seasons in this role, he coached in 489 games, winning 238 and losing 251 for a .487 winning percentage. He finished with a 102–136–0 (.429) SEC record. His 1975 Tigers team compiled a 40–16 record, winning the Southeastern Conference (SEC) title with a 19–3 record and reaching the NCAA playoffs for the first time. He was also equipment supervisor for the LSU Tigers football team from 1960 to 1981. Smith was fired as LSU's baseball coach in 1978 after three straight losing seasons, and later worked as a deputy for East Baton Rouge Parish in Louisiana.
