= C. V. Cusachs =

American baseball coach

Coaching career (HC unless noted)
- 1899: LSU

Head coaching record
- Overall: 5–5–1

C. V. Cusachs was the head baseball coach of the LSU Tigers baseball team in 1899. During his one season as head coach, he finished the season with a 5–5–1 record and (.500) winning percentage.
