= LSU Tigers baseball =

Baseball team of Louisiana State University

Coordinates: 30°24′20.4″N 91°11′17.1″W

- 2027 LSU Tigers baseball team
- Founded: 1893 (133 years ago)
- University: Louisiana State University
- Athletic director: Verge Ausberry
- Head coach: Jay Johnson (5th season)
- Conference: SEC
- Location: Baton Rouge, Louisiana
- Home stadium: Alex Box Stadium, Skip Bertman Field (capacity: 10,326)
- Nickname: Tigers
- Colors: Purple and gold

College World Series champions
- 1991, 1993, 1996, 1997, 2000, 2009, 2023, 2025

College World Series runner-up
- 2017

College World Series appearances
- 1986, 1987, 1989, 1990, 1991, 1993, 1994, 1996, 1997, 1998, 2000, 2003, 2004, 2008, 2009, 2013, 2015, 2017, 2023, 2025

NCAA regional champions
- 1986, 1987, 1989, 1990, 1991, 1993, 1994, 1996, 1997, 1998, 1999, 2000, 2001, 2002, 2003, 2004, 2008, 2009, 2012, 2013, 2015, 2016, 2017, 2019, 2021, 2023, 2025

NCAA tournament appearances
- 1975, 1985, 1986, 1987, 1989, 1990, 1991, 1992, 1993, 1994, 1995, 1996, 1997, 1998, 1999, 2000, 2001, 2002, 2003, 2004, 2005, 2008, 2009, 2010, 2012, 2013, 2014, 2015, 2016, 2017, 2018, 2019, 2021, 2022, 2023, 2024, 2025

Conference tournament champions
- 1986, 1990, 1992, 1993, 1994, 2000, 2008, 2009, 2010, 2013, 2014, 2017

Conference regular season champions
- 1939, 1943, 1946, 1961, 1975, 1986, 1990, 1991, 1992, 1993, 1996, 1997, 2003, 2009, 2012, 2015, 2017

The LSU Tigers baseball team represents Louisiana State University in NCAA Division I college baseball. The team participates in of the Southeastern Conference. The Tigers play home games on LSU's campus at Alex Box Stadium, Skip Bertman Field, and they are coached by Jay Johnson.

The Tigers are one of the major powers of college baseball, with 8 College World Series titles, most recently in 2025. They have also won 17 SEC championships and 12 conference tournament titles.

== History ==
=== The early years (1893–1962) ===
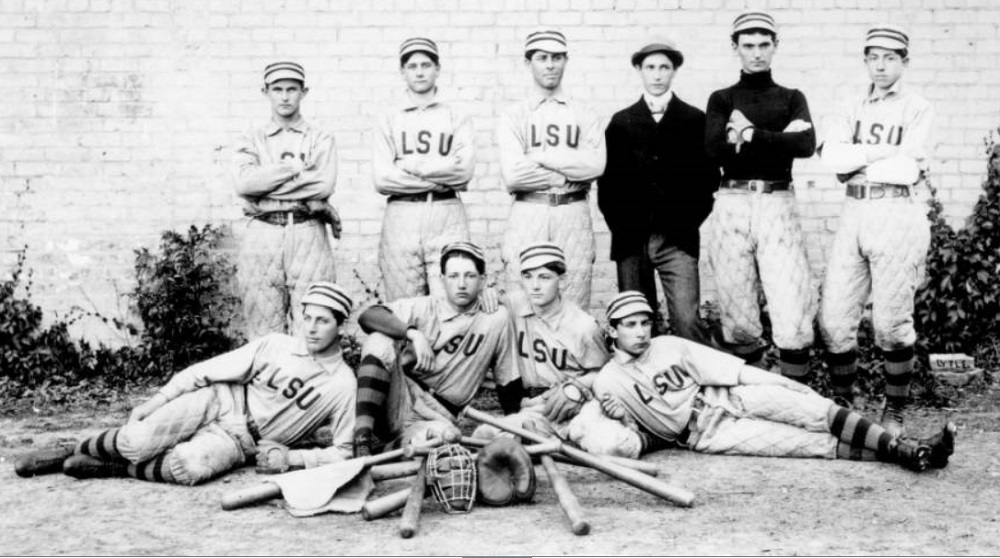
LSU baseball team c. 1900

During the program's first 30 seasons, LSU had a total of 15 head coaches. No coach's tenure lasted longer than two seasons, with the exception of C. C. Stroud, who was head coach for eight seasons.

Stroud coached LSU from 1914 to 1921 and had an overall record of 73–58–5 (.595). The program won at least ten games during four of his eight seasons as head coach.

=== Harry Rabenhorst (1927–1956) ===
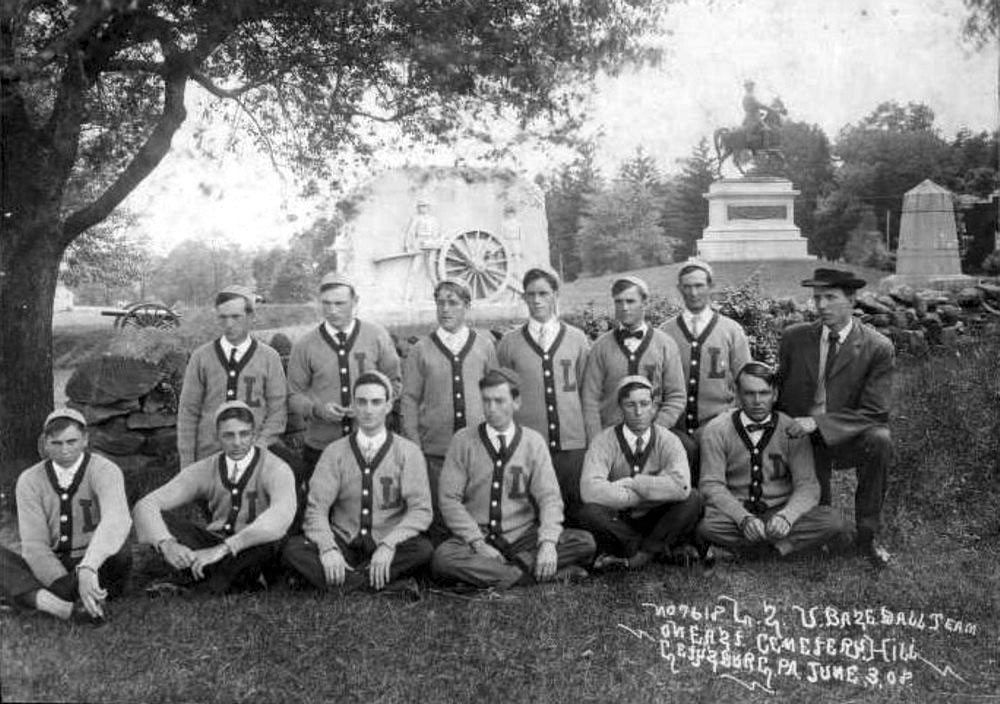
1908 baseball team

In 1927, Harry Rabenhorst became head baseball coach and became the longest tenured head baseball coach in LSU history. Rabenhorst began his career at LSU in 1925 as the head coach of the men's basketball team and two years later, in 1927, he also added head baseball coach to his duties. As baseball coach, he won two SEC baseball titles and was named SEC Coach of the Year in 1939 and 1946. Rabenhorst coached the baseball team from 1927 until 1942 when he left to serve in World War II. When he returned, he again coached the baseball team from 1946 until 1956. He finished his baseball coaching career with a record of 220–226–3. Later, as an athletic department administrator, he became the school's athletic director in 1967.

In 1938, LSU's new baseball stadium, referred to as either LSU Diamond or LSU Varsity Baseball Field, opened. The stadium was later renamed Alex Box Stadium for Simeon Alex Box, an LSU letterman (1942) who was killed in North Africa during World War II.

A. L. Swanson (1943–1945) During Rabenhorst's absence serving in World War II, A. L. Swanson served as head coach from 1943 to 1945. The Tigers won the 1943 SEC Championship under Swanson.

=== Ray Didier (1957–1963) ===
Raymond "Ray" Didier was head coach at LSU for 7 seasons from 1957 to 1963. He had an overall record of 104–79–1 (.568). He coached the 1961 team to the SEC championship. He left LSU to become Athletic director and head baseball coach at Nicholls State University.

=== Waldrop-Smith-Lamabe (1964–1983) ===
From 1964 to 1983, LSU was led by three head coaches. From 1964 to 1965, Jim Waldrop coached LSU for two seasons and had a 17–24 (.415) record. Jim Smith was head coach for 13 seasons from 1966 to 1978. He finished with an overall record of 238–251 (.487). When he left LSU after the 1978 season, he had the most wins of any head coach in program history. His 1975 team won an SEC championship and was LSU's first NCAA tournament team. From 1979 to 1983, Jack Lamabe was head coach at LSU for five seasons and had a record of 134–115 (.538).

=== Skip Bertman (1984–2001) ===
==== 1984–1990 ====
After playing college baseball at Miami (FL), coaching high school baseball, and serving as an assistant at Miami, Skip Bertman became LSU's head coach for the start of the 1984 season.

In Bertman's second season, 1985, the Tigers qualified for postseason play for the first time in ten years. In his third season, LSU made its first appearance in the College World Series in Omaha, Nebraska, the first of 11 appearances during Bertman's 18-year career. LSU returned to Omaha during the 1987 season, then failed to make the NCAA tournament in 1988, despite having a 39–21 record.

Bertman's 1989 team returned to the postseason, an appearance that started a streak of 17 consecutive postseason appearances. The 1989 team defeated Texas A&M in a regional final to qualify for the College World Series. The program also made the College World Series in 1990.

==== 1991 national championship ====
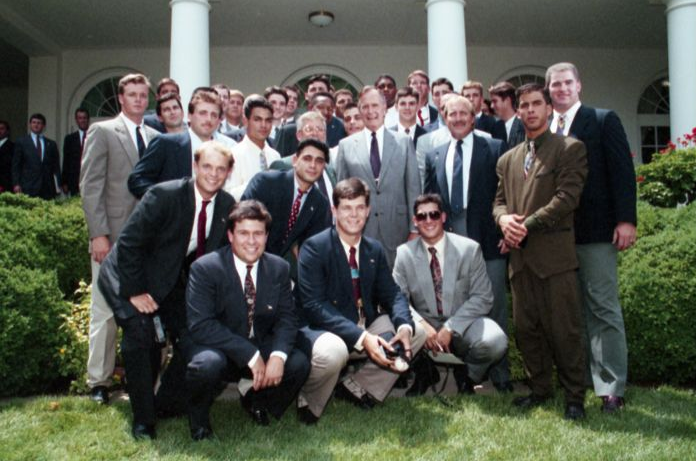
The 1991 Tigers with President George H. W. Bush at the White House

The program won its first national championship in 1991, defeating Wichita State in the College World Series final.

==== 1993 national championship ====
The program won its second national championship in 1993, again defeating Wichita State in the College World Series final.

==== 1996 national championship ====
In 1996, the Tigers entered the NCAA tournament on a two-game losing streak, after being eliminated from the SEC tournament by consecutive losses to Florida and Kentucky. However, based on the team's regular season performance, LSU was selected as one of the eight regional host sites for the NCAA tournament. The Tigers defeated Austin Peay, UNLV, and New Orleans before defeating Georgia Tech, 29–13, in the regional final. In the game, LSU broke multiple NCAA records, one of which still stands today: 8 doubles in an inning.

In the College World Series, the team defeated its first opponent, Wichita State, 9–8. LSU then faced Florida, which had beaten them three times in the regular season and once in the SEC Tournament, and won, 9–4. Florida came out of the losers' bracket to face LSU again, and LSU won, 2–1, to advance to the national championship game against Miami (FL).

In the game, LSU defeated Miami, 9–8, on a walk-off home run by Warren Morris. In the bottom of the 9th inning with two outs and the tying run on third base, Morris hit a home run to right field off of Miami freshman Robbie Morrison. The home run was Morris's first of the season, and it won the 1997 Showstopper of the Year ESPY Award.

==== 1997 national championship ====
LSU entered the 1997 season attempting to become the first team to win consecutive national championships since Stanford won championships in 1987 and 1988. The Tigers began the season with 19 consecutive wins, giving them 27 straight wins starting with the 1996 regional.

In the South I Regional, LSU lost the winner's bracket final to South Alabama, meaning the team had to win three games within 24 hours in order to advance to the College World Series. The Tigers won a five-hour game against Long Beach State, 14–7 in 11 innings, in which Bertman was ejected in the eighth inning for arguing a balk call. LSU then defeated South Alabama 14–4 and 15–4 to advance to the World Series.

There, the Tigers narrowly defeated Rice, but Larson's home run in the bottom of the seventh gave LSU a 5–4 victory. The Tigers then defeated Stanford, 10–5 and 13–9, before defeating Alabama 13–6 in the championship game.

==== 1998 season ====
In 1998, LSU hit 161 home runs. Eddy Furniss won the Dick Howser Trophy as the nation's most outstanding player and finished as the LSU and SEC all-time leader in home runs (80), RBI (308), hits (352), doubles (87) and total bases (689). Brad Cresse and Trey McClure also earned All-America honors by hitting 29 and 27 home runs, respectively.

The Tigers went undefeated in the South II Regional to reach the College World Series, seeking to become the first team to win three consecutive championships since USC won five consecutive from 1970 to 1974. LSU hit eight home runs in its first game in Omaha, defeating USC, 12–10, then hit six more in a 10–8 victory over SEC team Mississippi State. However, in the final two games, and the Tigers lost 5–4 and 7–3 to USC, which went on to win the championship with a 21–14 victory over Arizona State.

==== 2000 national championship ====
In 2000, LSU's regular season record was 39–17, and the team went undefeated in the SEC tournament to earn the #2 National seed in the NCAA tournament. LSU won the Baton Rouge Regional in three games, outscoring opponents 45–4. LSU then swept a best-of-three Super Regional against UCLA, winning 8–2 and 14–8.

LSU began play at the College World Series with a 13–5 win over Texas. In game two, LSU defeated USC, 10–4. In a close third game, LSU defeated Florida State, 6–3, and advanced to the championship game to face Stanford.

In the championship game on June 17, Stanford held an early 5–2 lead, but LSU scored three runs in the eighth inning with two home runs. LSU reliever Trey Hodges did not allow a run in the top of the ninth, his fourth scoreless inning of the game. In the bottom of the ninth, LSU led the inning off with a single and a walk to bring Brad Cresse to the plate with two runners on base. Cresse, who was 1–12 in the CWS prior to the at bat, hit a line drive single into left field to score Ryan Theriot from second, giving LSU its fifth national championship in 10 years. LSU had 5 players named to the All-Tournament team– Blair Barbier, Mike Fontenot, Brad Hawpe, Hodges, and Theriot. Hodges was named the Tournament's Most Outstanding Player after finishing the CWS with a 2–0 record and one save.

LSU finished the 2000 postseason with a 13–0 record and moved to 5–0 all time in national championship games.

==== Retirement ====
Skip Bertman led the Tigers to a 44–22–1 mark during his final season as head coach in 2001. The Tigers won the West Division, reached the SEC Tournament championship game, and won the Baton Rouge Regional, but lost in three games in a Super Regional against Tulane at Zephyr Field.

Bertman won 870 games, seven SEC titles, and 11 CWS appearances. His teams averaged 48 wins per year and qualified for the NCAA tournament in 16 of his 18 seasons.

His jersey number, 15, is one of four numbers retired by LSU. LSU also renamed a part of South Stadium Drive, between Nicholson and River Road, Skip Bertman Drive in his honor. The renamed portion runs past the old Alex Box Stadium, which has now been demolished following the opening of LSU's new stadium in 2009, the field of which is named for Bertman.

In a Baseball America poll published in 1999, Bertman was voted the second greatest college baseball coach of the 20th century, behind Rod Dedeaux of Southern California.

In June 2002, Bertman was inducted into the Louisiana Sports Hall of Fame. He was inducted into the American Baseball Coaches Association Hall of Fame in January 2003. In 2006, Skip Bertman was inducted into the inaugural class of the College Baseball Hall of Fame in Lubbock, Texas.

After the end of the 2001 season, Bertman became LSU's athletic director. During his tenure, LSU won six total national championships and two BCS National Titles. Bertman served in the position until June 2008, and as Athletic Director Emeritus until June 2010.

In anticipation of Bertman's retirement, Louisiana-Monroe coach Smoke Laval was brought on as an administrative assistant for the LSU baseball team in 2001 and succeeded Bertman as coach in 2002. Laval was returning to LSU where he served as an assistant coach under Bertman from 1984 to 1993. In 1993, Laval left LSU for ULM (then known as Northeast Louisiana). While at NLU/ULM, Laval posted a record of 241–159, a winning percentage of .603, and led the Indians (Now Warhawks) to 3 NCAA regional appearances.

=== Smoke Laval (2002–2006) ===
The expectations were lofty for Laval when he accepted the job as head coach at LSU. In his first year, Laval led the Tigers to a 44–22 record overall. The Tigers hosted a regional in Baton Rouge, which they won, and moved on to the Houston Super-Regional to face Rice, where their season ended. His first year at the helm raised expectations even more after he experienced great success.

In 2003 and 2004, Laval would lead the Tigers to 45–22–1 and 46–19 overall record respectively. LSU would earn the No. 2 national seed in the 2003 tournament, and would host a super regional both years, meaning the road to Omaha went through Baton Rouge. LSU made the College World Series both years, but disappointed both years, posting an 0–2 record each year. Tiger fans were not used to leaving Omaha without a win, so questions about Laval's leadership and ability to continue the success of the program began to arise.

In 2005, LSU struggled during the regular season despite a 40–22 record overall. The Tigers lost 12 games in SEC play and lost to Southern for only the second time in 41 tries. Rice would go on to defeat the Tigers in the Baton Rouge Regional Finals.

2006 would see LSU post a 35–24 mark overall, their worst since 1983. They also posted their first losing SEC record in 23 years and would miss the NCAA tournament for the first time in 18 years. Under growing pressure from fans and the administration, Laval officially resigned on June 4, 2006.

=== Paul Mainieri (2007–2021) ===
==== 2007–2008 ====
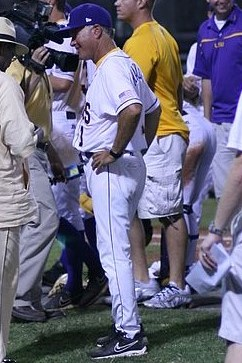
Paul Maineiri

On June 28, 2006, Paul Mainieri was named the twenty-fifth head coach of LSU Baseball. Mainieri returned to Baton Rouge, where he began his career in college baseball 30 years earlier as a freshman at LSU in 1976. Mainieri finished his collegiate playing career at the University of New Orleans. Prior to his arrival at LSU, Mainieri coached St. Thomas University in Florida, Air Force, and Notre Dame.

In his first season at LSU, the Tigers posted a mark of 29–26–1. The season was full of ups and downs, with the Tigers winning four SEC series against Top 25 opponents, but struggling in non-conference play. After the season, Mainieri realized changes had to be made and informed certain players that they should consider other options, as well as making some changes to his current staff. Mainieri was able to put together a tremendous recruiting class following the 2007 season, which was later ranked No. 1 by Baseball News.

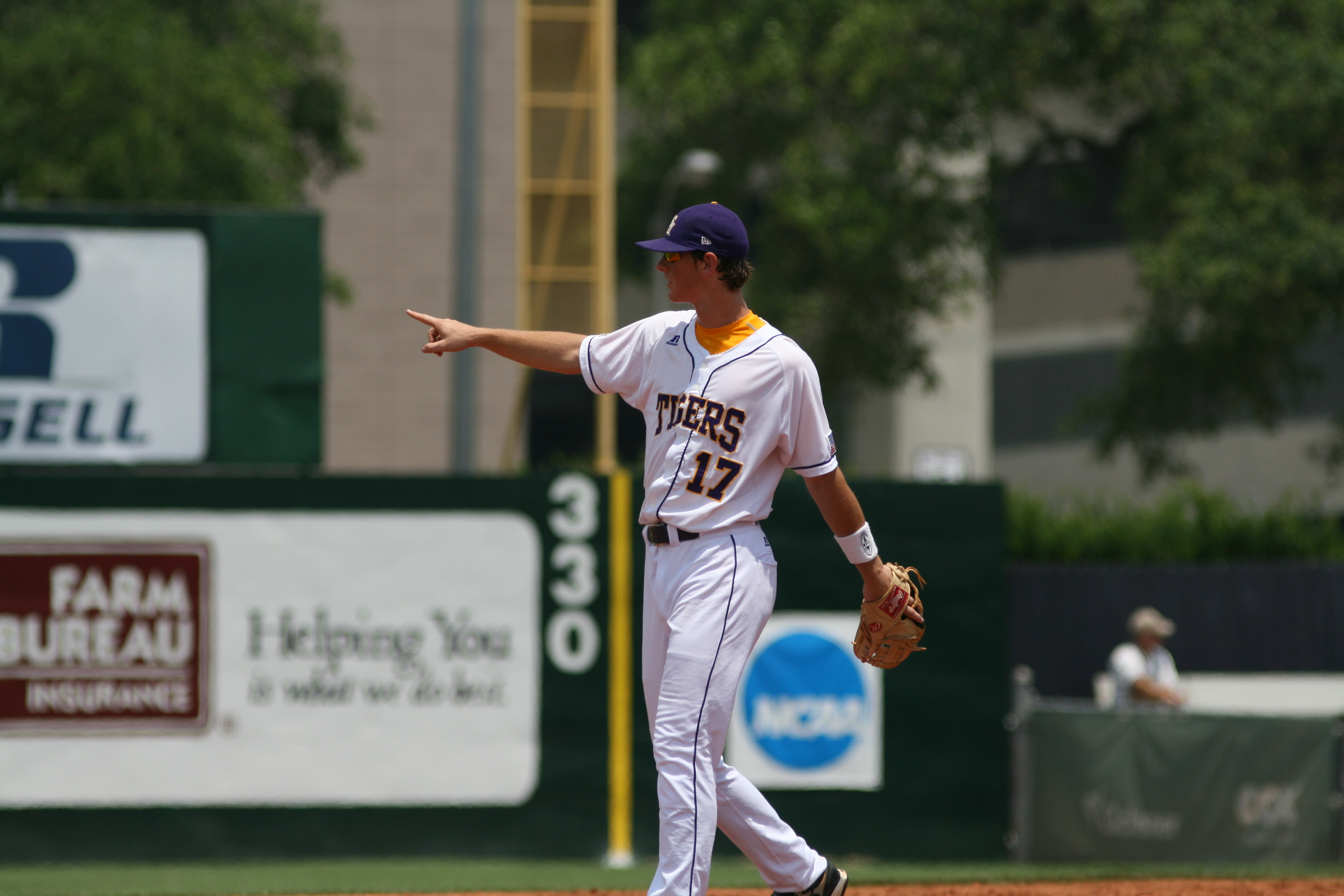
Major League All-Star, batting champion and Gold Glove winner; DJ LeMahieu helped lead Mainieri's 2009 team to a National Championship.

In his second year, LSU was predicted to finish fifth in the SEC Western division by the SEC baseball coaches before the year started. Following an amazing turnaround, Coach Mainieri led LSU to the SEC Western Division championship with a conference record of 18–11–1, and the No. 2 seed in the 2008 SEC baseball tournament. The Tigers finished the regular season record at 39–16–1. The team won the 2008 SEC Tournament (held May 20–25 in Hoover, Alabama). With the win, LSU won 20 consecutive games, breaking the previous school record of 19 consecutive wins during the 1997 season and tying the SEC's second-longest streak of wins. Fourteen of those wins were come-from-behind wins, while the last 15 were made wearing the distinctive gold jerseys.

By winning the SEC Tournament, LSU earned a 7th national seed in the NCAA tournament and extended the life of the old Alex Box Stadium as Baton Rouge hosted a regional bracket of the NCAA tournament. LSU swept the series, defeating Texas Southern (12–1) and Southern Miss (twice, 13–4 and 11–4) to win the regional bracket. With the sweep of the Regional series, LSU extended their winning streak to a SEC-record 23 straight games.

As a result of the Regional, LSU and Baton Rouge earned a spot in the Super-Regional series, hosting UC-Irvine in the last three games to be played in the old Alex Box Stadium. LSU lost the first game, 11–5, ending their streak of wins at 23. LSU recovered in the second game of the series, scoring six runs in the top of the ninth inning to force a third game with a dramatic come-from-behind win, 9–7. On Monday, June 9, 2008, in the final game to be played at the Alex Box Stadium, with a record-setting crowd of 8,173 watching, LSU dominated UC-Irvine with a 21–7 win to move to the 2008 College World Series.

In the 2008 College World Series, No. 7 LSU faced the No. 2 North Carolina Tarheels in the first round, losing 8–4. The Tigers, facing elimination in a game against the Rice Owls, won in dramatic fashion, 6–5, continuing their string of come-from-behind victories. On June 20, 2008, after a rain delay of nearly 24 hours, UNC and LSU resumed their elimination game matchup, resulting in a 7–3 loss for LSU. The team was defeated after giving up the only grand slam in the 2008 CWS in the top of the ninth inning. During the 2008 regular and post-regulation baseball season, LSU's games have continuously featured both dramatic victories and controversial calls.

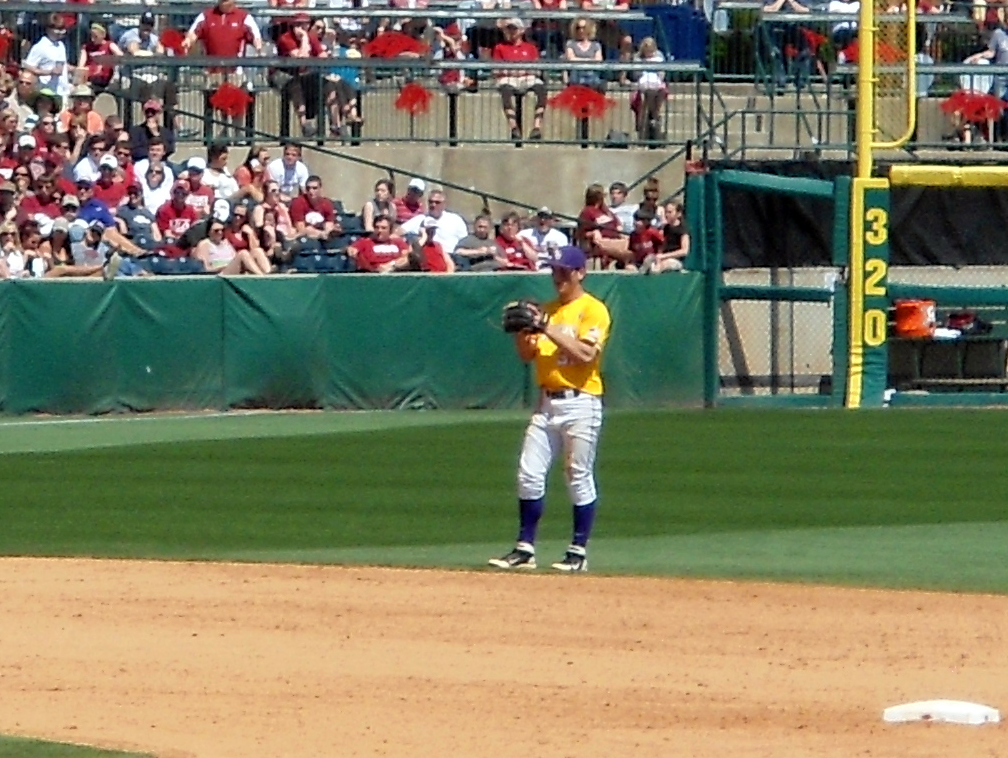
Alex Bregman playing shortstop for LSU

==== 2009 national championship ====
The 2009 season was the first for LSU playing at Alex Box Stadium, Skip Bertman Field. In the post-season, LSU traveled to Omaha after sweeping Southern University, Baylor University and the University of Minnesota in the regionals and Rice University in the super regionals.

They started play at the College World Series and faced the Virginia Cavaliers in the first round, winning 9–5. In the winner's bracket game, LSU played the Arkansas Razorbacks and won by a score of 9–1. In a rematch, the Tigers beat the Razorbacks again by a score of 14–5, advancing to the CWS finals for the first time since 2000. They played against the Texas Longhorns in a best-of-three series for the title, and won Game 1, 7–6 in a dramatic comeback win in 11 innings. The Longhorns beat the Tigers in game 2, 5–1, to force a third and final game. The Tigers out-slugged the Longhorns 11–4 in game 3 to win their 6th National Championship and first since 2000. The series MVP was outfielder Jared Mitchell.

==== 2010–2021 ====
Under Mainieri, the Tigers also played in the 2013 and 2015 College World Series. During the 2015 MLB draft, Alex Bregman was selected by the Houston Astros with the second pick of the draft. He was the fifth LSU Tiger to be drafted in the first round in seven years, the highest-drafted position player in LSU's history, and the second-highest overall behind pitcher Ben McDonald (1989).

In 2017, LSU played Florida in a best-of-three series to determine the winner of the 2017 College World Series. Florida defeated LSU and the Tigers finished as College World Series runner-up for the first time in school history.

Mainieri retired following LSU's 2021 super regional loss to SEC rival Tennessee at Knoxville. In 15 full seasons (the 2020 season ended after 17 games due to the COVID-19 pandemic), Mainieri compiled a 641-285-3 (.692) record.

=== Jay Johnson (2022–present) ===
Following Mainieri's retirement, LSU hired Arizona baseball Head coach Jay Johnson who had just finished a run at the 2021 College World Series, posting an 0-2 exit.

The 2022 season saw the Tigers post a 40-22 overall record and a 3rd place finish in the SEC west. The team would suffer major losses such as sweeps to both Arkansas and eventual champion Ole Miss. The Tigers earned a berth at the Southern Miss Regional of the 2022 NCAA Division I baseball tournament, winning their first two games against Kennesaw St and regional host Southern Miss. before dropping their final 2 to the Golden Eagles.

==== 2023 national championship ====
The 2023 season saw notable transfers come in such as DH Tommy White of NC State and RHP Paul Skenes of Air Force. Ranked Preseason #1 by D1 Baseball, the Tigers would hold this spot for 13 weeks until series losses to both Auburn and Mississippi State. After a 1-2 appearance at the 2023 Southeastern Conference baseball tournament, LSU would earn #5 national seed and host a Regional for the first time since 2019. With sweeps of their regional and a Super Regional versus Kentucky the Tigers would earn their first CWS appearance since 2017. LSU would go on to win their bracket in dramatic fashion against the #1 ranked Wake Forest Demon Deacons in the bottom of the 11th inning with a walkoff by Tommy White. LSU would then go on and defeat the Florida Gators 2-1 in the CWS Final, earning their seventh national championship in the sport.

==== 2025 national championship ====
In 2024, Johnson coached LSU to the regional championship in Chapel Hill, North Carolina against the host, North Carolina, coming up just short in extra innings in the final game of the regional. In 2025, he was able to lead LSU back to the College World Series, marking its 20th appearance there, and another national championship with a win over Coastal Carolina in the championship series. It was Johnson's second national championship and the eighth for LSU.

The 2026 LSU Tigers baseball team saw significant struggles and missed the NCAA Baseball Regionals for the first time since 2011.

== Championships ==
=== National championships ===
Year	Coach	Record	Result
1991	Skip Bertman	55–18	Beat Wichita State, 6–3
1993	Skip Bertman	53–17–1	Beat Wichita State, 8–0
1996	Skip Bertman	52–15	Beat Miami, 9–8
1997	Skip Bertman	57–13	Beat Alabama, 13–6
2000	Skip Bertman	52–17	Beat Stanford, 6–5
2009	Paul Mainieri	56–17	Beat Texas, 7–6, 1–5, 11–4
2023	Jay Johnson	54–17	Beat Florida, 4–3, 4–24, 18–4
2025	Jay Johnson	53-15	Beat Coastal Carolina 1–0, 5–3
Total National Championships: 8

=== College World Series appearances ===
Year	Coach	Record	Results
1986	Skip Bertman	55–14	4–0 in South I Regional, 1–2 in CWS
1987	Skip Bertman	49–19	4–0 in South II Regional, 2–2 in CWS
1989	Skip Bertman	55–17	5–1 in Central Regional, 2–2 in CWS
1990	Skip Bertman	54–19	5–1 in South I Regional, 2–2 in CWS
1991	Skip Bertman	55–18	4–0 in South Regional, 4–0 in CWS, National champions
1993	Skip Bertman	53–17–1	4–1 in South Regional, 4–1 in CWS, National champions
1994	Skip Bertman	46–20	4–0 in South Regional, 0–2 in CWS
1996	Skip Bertman	52–15	4–0 in South II Regional, 4–0 in CWS, National champions
1997	Skip Bertman	57–13	5–1 in South I Regional, 4–0 in CWS, National champions
1998	Skip Bertman	48–19	4–0 in South II Regional, 2–2 in CWS
2000	Skip Bertman	52–17	3–0 in Baton Rouge Regional, 2–0 in Baton Rouge Super Regional, 4–0 in CWS, National champions
2003	Smoke Laval	45–22–1	3–0 in Baton Rouge Regional, 2–1 in Baton Rouge Super Regional, 0–2 in CWS
2004	Smoke Laval	46–19	3–0 in Baton Rouge Regional, 2–0 in Baton Rouge Super Regional, 0–2 in CWS
2008	Paul Mainieri	49–19–1	3–0 in Baton Rouge Regional, 2–1 in Baton Rouge Super Regional, 1–2 in CWS
2009	Paul Mainieri	56–17	3–0 in Baton Rouge Regional, 2–0 in Baton Rouge Super Regional, 5–1 in CWS, National champions
2013	Paul Mainieri	57–11	3–0 in Baton Rouge Regional, 2–0 in Baton Rouge Super Regional, 0–2 in CWS
2015	Paul Mainieri	54–12	3–0 in Baton Rouge Regional, 2–0 in Baton Rouge Super Regional, 1–2 in CWS
2017	Paul Mainieri	52–20	3–0 in Baton Rouge Regional, 2–0 in Baton Rouge Super Regional, 4–3 in CWS
2023	Jay Johnson	54–17	3–0 in Baton Rouge Regional, 2–0 in Baton Rouge Super Regional, 6–2 in CWS, National champions
2025	Jay Johnson	53–15	3–1 in Baton Rouge Regional, 2–0 in Baton Rouge Super Regional, 5–0 in CWS, National champions
Total College World Series appearances: 20

== Traditions ==
=== Attendance ===
Total Attendance: As of the 2018 baseball season, LSU has finished in the final college baseball total attendance rankings in 23 straight seasons. LSU posted a total attendance figure of 399,085 in 37 games.

In 2013, LSU posted an NCAA-record total attendance figure of 473,298 in 43 games, which was 191,458 greater than second-place team Mississippi State (281,840). LSU is also the only school in NCAA history to exceed 400,000 in total baseball attendance in a season.

Average Attendance: As of the 2018 baseball season, LSU finished No. 1 in the final average attendance rankings for the 22nd time in 23 years (Arkansas finished No. 1 in average attendance in 2007). In 2018, LSU averaged 10,786 tickets sold per game.

Largest Home Attendance: LSU's paid attendance figure of 13,068 for the LSU-Tennessee game on March 30, 2023, established a school record. LSU defeated Tennessee, 5-2.

=== Gold Jerseys ===
LSU introduced gold jerseys for the 1996 post-season. The Tigers went on to win their 3rd National Championship that year while wearing the gold jerseys in the championship game. The jerseys became part of LSU Baseball lore when with 2 outs and a runner on third base with LSU losing 8–7 in the bottom of the 9th inning, LSU's Warren Morris swung at the first pitch and lined the ball just inches over the right field fence for a game winning walk-off home run. This was his first home run of the season as he had missed 39 games with a broken bone in his hand. The jerseys became more ingrained in LSU lore when the Tigers also wore them during the 1997 post-season which resulted in another national championship, the program's 4th. After the 1996 and 1997 National Championships, the baseball program reserved the gold jerseys for select games.

Under head coach Paul Mainieri, the team wears the gold jerseys regularly on the third game of a three-game series, as well as during important tournament games. One such game was game 3 of the 2009 College World Series Finals versus the Texas Longhorns. The Tigers defeated the Longhorns 11–4 to win the programs 6th National Championship wearing the gold jerseys.

=== LSU Bat Girls ===
The LSU Bat Girls are a support squad that contributes to the LSU Baseball program. The Bat Girls consist of 30 individuals who work in teams of 10 at all home games, post-season games and various charity events. The squad serves as hostesses at Alex Box Stadium, Skip Bertman Field and their responsibilities include selling game day programs, recovering foul balls, retrieving bats and helmets, answering fans questions, assisting with game day promotions and giveaways and checking on umpires. They also assist the athletic department with many different aspects of the game such as attending coaches committee meetings.

=== Tailgating ===
Tailgating is found across campus with many fans tailgating in the same spot year after year. Some tailgaters form affiliations or organizations and name their "tailgating krewes".

LSU has continually been ranked as the top tailgating location in the country. ESPN.com ranked LSU as the top tailgating destination in America. The Sporting News proclaimed "Saturday Night in Death Valley" and Tiger tailgating as the top tradition in college football. Sports Illustrated said, "When It Comes To Great Tailgating, Nothing Compares To LSU." LSU's tailgating was named No. 1 in an Associated Press poll on top tailgating spots and by a CNN network survey on top tailgating locations.

Visiting team supporters are often subjected to the chants of "Tiger Bait! Tiger Bait!" However, the opposing fans who respond positively to the jeers and jaunts are frequently invited to join in on tailgating festivities, which feature regional Cajun cuisine, local beverages, and other traditions of LSU sports. This hospitality reflects the broader athletic traditions of Baton Rouge. During the baseball season, it is common for some fans to tailgate continuously through a three-day weekend series.

=== Super Fans ===
Chris "Mouth of the South" Guillot will lead chants of "Here We Go Tigers" and others to cheer on the LSU Tigers and distract opponents. Chris graduated from LSU in 1986 and rarely misses any games.

Anita "K-Lady" Haywood is known for hanging "K" signs in the stands that denote strikeouts by LSU pitchers. Anita graduated from Louisiana Tech University, but grew up in Baton Rouge and began attending LSU baseball games regularly after meeting her husband who loved LSU baseball. Originally homemade, her current wooden "K" signs were given to her by the Coaches Committee in 1992, the Official Booster Club of LSU Baseball.

Jerry "The Birdman" Padgett can be found chirping at home games. Often heard, but rarely seen, he has been whistling at LSU baseball games since at least the 1990s. His whistles are similar to that of a song bird.

Joy “Sign Lady” Hammatt is known for going to the College World Series in Omaha every time LSU goes, her tailgating, and her signs showing support for the Tigers.

== Stadiums ==
=== Alex Box Stadium, Skip Bertman Field ===
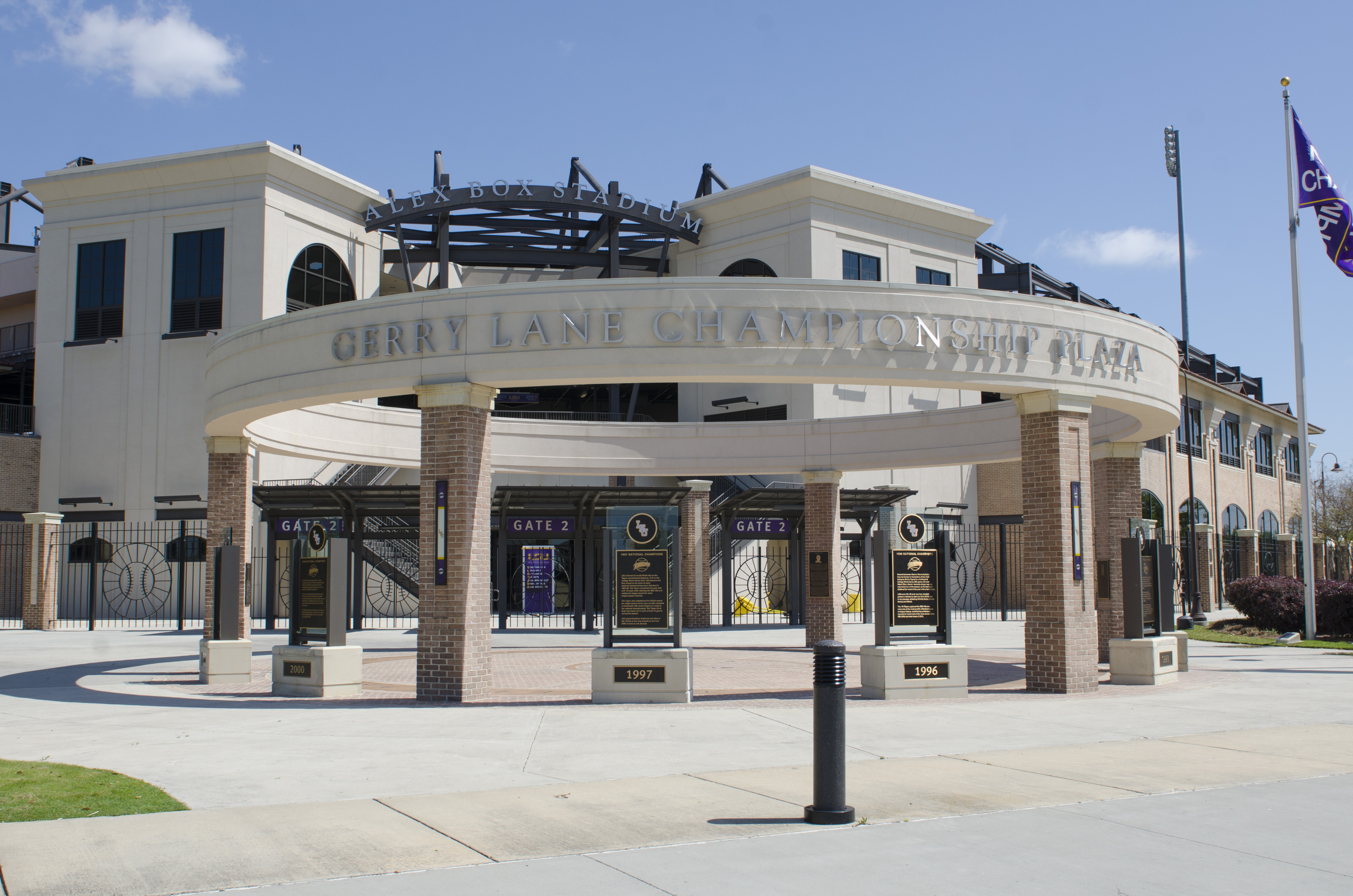
Alex Box Stadium, Skip Bertman Field, current LSU's venue

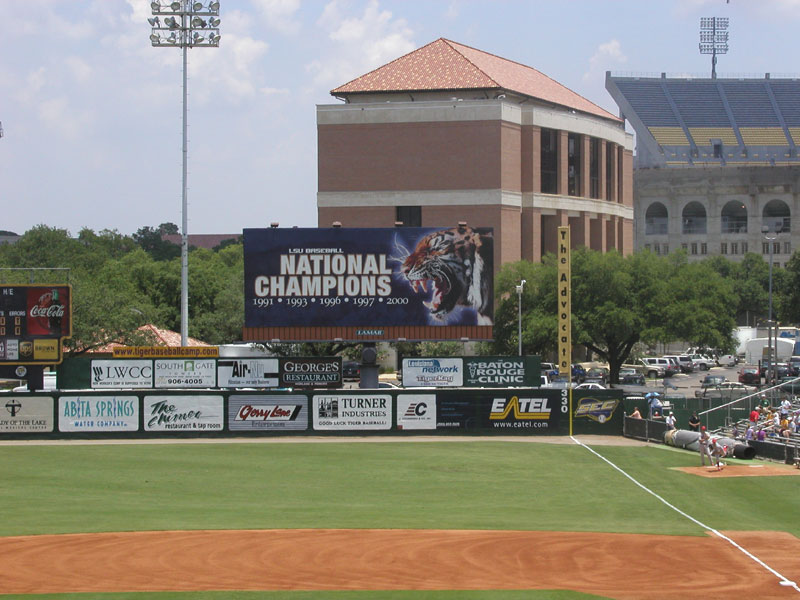
The Intimidator behind the right field fence in Alex Box Stadium

Alex Box Stadium, Skip Bertman Field is a baseball stadium in Baton Rouge, Louisiana. It is the home stadium of the Louisiana State University Tigers college baseball team since 2009. The stadium section (and LSU's previous baseball stadium 400 yards (370 m) to the north) were named for Simeon Alex Box, an LSU letterman (1942), purple heart and distinguished service cross recipient, who was killed in North Africa during World War II. In 2013, the field was named in honor of former LSU head baseball coach and athletic director, Skip Bertman.

=== Alex Box Stadium ===
Alex Box Stadium was a baseball stadium in Baton Rouge, Louisiana. It was the home field of the Louisiana State University Tigers college baseball team from 1938 to 2008. It was most notable for The Intimidator, a large billboard behind the right-field fence featuring the six years in which LSU had won the College World Series while playing in the stadium. The field was also notable for giving up many home runs due to the high humidity of Louisiana, the prevailing winds out of the south which push balls hit to left field out of the park, and the short fences (the dimensions were believed to be anywhere from 7–10 feet shorter than what was posted on the fences).

=== Second LSU Diamond ===
For the 1936 and 1937 seasons, LSU Baseball played on its second diamond on the new Baton Rouge campus. The playing field was located north of Tiger Stadium and was equipped with wooden bleachers.

=== First LSU Diamond ===
From 1929 to 1936, the LSU Baseball team played their home games on a field located on the Campanile Parade Grounds.

=== State Field ===
State Field was the home field for the LSU baseball team from 1893 to 1924. The field was located on the old downtown campus of LSU. It was located south of the Pentagon Barracks and slightly southwest of the site of the current Louisiana State Capitol Building adjacent to the Hill Memorial Library and George Peabody Hall. The field was later moved to a site with bleachers that was north of the campuses experimental garden, and next to the old armory building. The field was known on the campus simply as the "athletic field" and was also used for LSU's basketball and football teams.

== Practice and training facilities ==
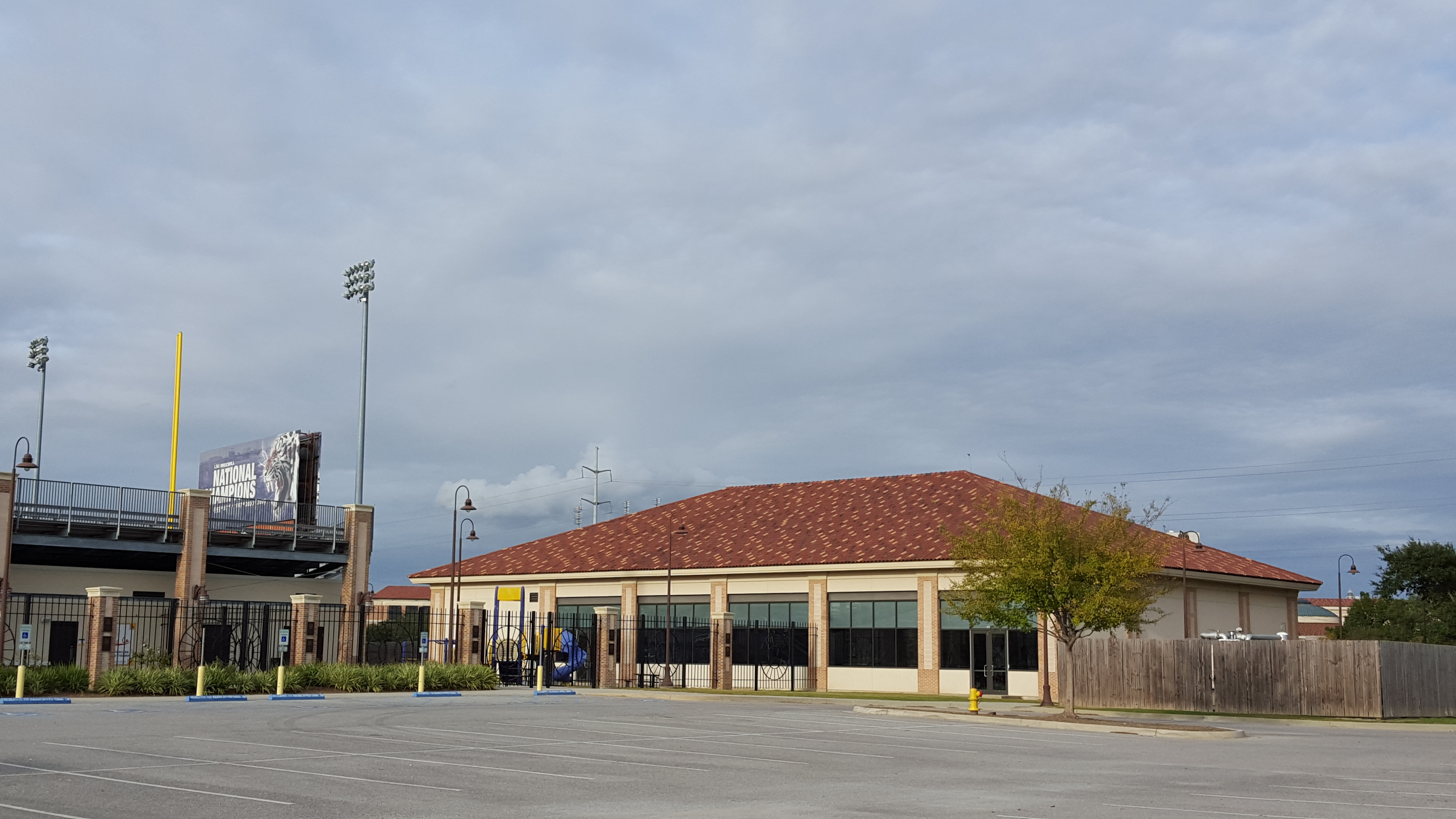
Worley Family Batting Cage Pavilion

=== Worley Family Batting Cage Pavilion ===
The Worley Family Batting Cage Pavilion holds the LSU indoor batting cages behind the right field wall at Alex Box Stadium, Skip Bertman Field. The facility allows the Tigers baseball team to practice year-round without interference from inclement weather.

=== LSU Baseball Strength and Conditioning facility ===
The LSU Tigers baseball team weight room is over 10,000 square feet and includes multi-purpose flat surface platform, bench, incline, squat and Olympic lifting stations along with dumbbell bench stations. It is also equipped with medicine balls, hurdles, plyometric boxes, assorted speed and agility equipment, treadmills, stationary bikes and elliptical cross trainers. The weight room features multiple high-definition TV's for multimedia presentations. It is located in the LSU Football Operations Center.

== Head coaches ==
- Records are through the end of the 2025 Season

Tenure	Coach	Seasons	Record	Pct.
1893	E. B. Young	1	1–0	(1.000)
1894	No games in 1894			
1895	No coach in 1895	1	0–3–1	(.125)
1896	No games in 1896			
1897	E. A. Scott	1	3–3	(.500)
1898	Allen Jeardeau	1	2–3	(.400)
1899	C. V. Cusachs	1	5–5–1	(.500)
1900–1901	L. P. Piper	2	8–6–1	(.567)
1902–1903	W. S. Borland	2	10–11–1	(.477)
1904	No games in 1904			
1905–1906	Dan A. Killian	2	14–9	(.609)
1907	J. Phillips	1	11–7	(.611)
1908–1909	Edgar Wingard	2	16–22–1	(.423)
1910–1911	John W. Mayhew	2	15–16	(.484)
1912–1913	Bob Pender	2	15–17	(.469)
1914–1921	C. C. Stroud	8	75–58–5	(.562)
1922–1923	Branch Bocock	2	15–15–2	(.500)
1924	Moon Ducote	1	4–9	(.308)
1925–1926	Mike Donahue	2	15–15–3	(.500)
1927–1942	Harry Rabenhorst	See Below		
1943–1945	A. L. Swanson	3	28–23	(.549)
1946–1956	Harry Rabenhorst	27	228–240–7	(.487)
1957–1963	Ray Didier	7	104–79–1	(.568)
1964–1965	Jim Waldrop	2	17–24–1	(.417)
1966–1978	Jim Smith	13	238–251	(.487)
1979–1983	Jack Lamabe	5	134–115	(.538)
1984–2001	Skip Bertman	18	870–330–3	(.724)
2002–2006	Smoke Laval	5	210–109–1	(.658)
2007–2021	Paul Mainieri	15	641–283–3	(.693)
2022–present	Jay Johnson	4	190–77	(.712)
Total	26 coaches	130 seasons	2,839–1,702–31	(.624)

Longest Tenure
Rank	Name	Seasons
1	Harry Rabenhorst	27
2	Skip Bertman	18
3	Paul Mainieri	15

Most Wins
Rank	Name	Wins
1	Skip Bertman	870
2	Paul Mainieri	641
3	Jim Smith	238

Best Winning Pct.
Rank	Name	Pct.
1	E. B. Young	1.000
2	Skip Bertman	.724
3	Jay Johnson	.712

== Year-by-year results ==
Year	Coach	Overall	Conference	Standing	Notes
Independent (1893–1895)
1893	E. B. Young	1–0	–	–	
1894					No Games in 1894
1895	No Coach	0–3–1	–	–	
Southern Intercollegiate Athletic Association (1896–1917)
1896					No Games in 1896
1897	E. A. Scott	3–3			
1898	Allen Jeardeau	2–3			
1899	C. V. Cusachs	5–5–1			
1900	L. P. Piper	2–3–2			
1901	L. P. Piper	6–3			
1902	W. S. Borland	6–6–1			
1903	W. S. Borland	4–5			
1904					No Games in 1904
1905	Dan A. Killian	4–6			
1906	Dan A. Killian	10–3			
1907	J. Phillips	11–7			
1908	Edgar Wingard	9–12–1			
1909	Edgar Wingard	7–10			
1910	John W. Mayhew	7–9			
1911	John W. Mayhew	8–7			
1912	Bob Pender	8–6			
1913	Bob Pender	7–11			
1914	C. C. Stroud	4–10			
1915	C. C. Stroud	10–9–1			
1916	C. C. Stroud	15–8			
1917	C. C. Stroud	7–4–2			
Independent (1918)
1918	C. C. Stroud	8–4	–	–	No conference games in 1918. SIAA was inactive
Southern Intercollegiate Athletic Association (1919–1921)
1919	C. C. Stroud	12–4			
1920	C. C. Stroud	10–8–1			
1921	C. C. Stroud	9–11–1			
Southern Conference (1922–1932)
1922	Branch Bocock	7–6			
1923	Branch Bocock	8–9–2			
1924	Moon Ducote	4–9			
1925	Mike Donahue	5–9–2			
1926	Mike Donahue	10–6–1			
1927	Harry Rabenhorst	8–6			
1928	Harry Rabenhorst	7–11			
1929	Harry Rabenhorst	3–6			
1930	Harry Rabenhorst	6–8			
1931	Harry Rabenhorst	3–6–1			
1932	Harry Rabenhorst	4–7–1			
Southeastern Conference (1933–present)
1933	Harry Rabenhorst	2–8	0–4	7th	
1934	Harry Rabenhorst	6–8–1	3–6	7th	
1935	Harry Rabenhorst	8–7	4–6	6th	
1936	Harry Rabenhorst	15–4	7–4	2nd	
1937	Harry Rabenhorst	12–14	5–10	7th	
1938	Harry Rabenhorst	7–8–1	3–6–1	8th	
1939	Harry Rabenhorst	22–6	10–2	1st	SEC Champions
1940	Harry Rabenhorst	16–5	10–4	3rd	
1941	Harry Rabenhorst	10–13	5–9	9th	
1942	Harry Rabenhorst	9–9	7–5	4th	
1943	A. L. Swanson	13–8	11–3	1st	SEC Champions
1944	A. L. Swanson	4–8	–	–	No conference games in 1944
1945	A. L. Swanson	11–7	–	–	No conference games in 1945
1946	Harry Rabenhorst	12–5	11–3	1st	SEC Champions
1947	Harry Rabenhorst	10–9–1	4–7	10th	
1948	Harry Rabenhorst	7–14–1	4–10	9th	
1949	Harry Rabenhorst	6–11	5–9	9th	
1950	Harry Rabenhorst	5–9–1	2–7–1	11th	
1951	Harry Rabenhorst	10–6	6–6	5th	
1952	Harry Rabenhorst	9–11	7–9	7th	
1953	Harry Rabenhorst	8–10	7–8	7th	
1954	Harry Rabenhorst	8–11	5–10	10th	
1955	Harry Rabenhorst	6–17	4–11	10th	
1956	Harry Rabenhorst	9–11	7–9	7th	
1957	Ray Didier	8–11	6–8	8th	
1958	Ray Didier	14–11	9–6	4th	
1959	Ray Didier	16–17	7–9	3rd (West)	
1960	Ray Didier	15–14	6–9	4th (West)	
1961	Ray Didier	20–5	11–4	1st (West)	SEC Champions; Final ranking No. 22
1962	Ray Didier	15–11–1	8–7–1	2nd (West)	
1963	Ray Didier	16–10	9–7	2nd (West)	
1964	Jim Waldrop	11–11–1	5–7	4th (West)	
1965	Jim Waldrop	6–13	4–11	5th (West)	
1966	Jim Smith	9–14	4–12	5th (West)	
1967	Jim Smith	17–13	9–8	1st (West)	
1968	Jim Smith	20–14	10–8	1st (West)	
1969	Jim Smith	11–24	4–13	4th (West)	
1970	Jim Smith	16–19	5–11	3rd (West)	
1971	Jim Smith	20–16	10–8	2nd (West)	
1972	Jim Smith	21–21	7–11	2nd (West)	
1973	Jim Smith	18–13	6–7	2nd (West)	
1974	Jim Smith	18–17	7–10	4th (West)	
1975	Jim Smith	40–16	19–3	1st (West)	SEC Champions; Final ranking No. 19
1976	Jim Smith	19–23	11–12	3rd (West)	
1977	Jim Smith	17–27	4–15	5th (West)	
1978	Jim Smith	12–34	6–18	5th (West)	
1979	Jack Lamabe	34–20	13–7	2nd (West)	
1980	Jack Lamabe	23–19	8–9	4th (West)	
1981	Jack Lamabe	23–30	7–14	4th (West)	
1982	Jack Lamabe	26–25	9–13	4th (West)	
1983	Jack Lamabe	28–21	9–12	4th (West)	
1984	Skip Bertman	32–23	12–12	3rd (West)	
1985	Skip Bertman	41–18	17–7	1st (West)	SEC West Champions; Final ranking No. 24
1986	Skip Bertman	55–14	22–5	1st	SEC Champions; SEC tournament champions; Final ranking No. 5
1987	Skip Bertman	49–19	12–10	5th	Final ranking No. 4
1988	Skip Bertman	39–21	16–11	5th	
1989	Skip Bertman	55–17	18–9	2nd	Final ranking No. 4
1990	Skip Bertman	54–19	20–7	1st	SEC Champions; SEC Tournament co-champions; Final ranking No. 4
1991	Skip Bertman	55–18	19–7	1st	SEC Champions; College World Series champions; Final ranking No. 1
1992	Skip Bertman	50–16	18–6	1st	SEC West Champions; SEC Champions; SEC tournament champions; Final ranking No. 9
1993	Skip Bertman	53–17–1	18–8–1	1st	SEC West Champions; SEC Champions; SEC tournament champions; College World Series champions; Final ranking No. 1
1994	Skip Bertman	46–20	21–6	2nd	SEC West Champions; SEC tournament champions; Final ranking No. 7
1995	Skip Bertman	47–18	17–12	5th	Final ranking No. 18
1996	Skip Bertman	52–15	20–10	1st	SEC West Champions; SEC Champions; College World Series champions; Final ranking No. 1
1997	Skip Bertman	57–13	22–7	1st	SEC West Champions; SEC Champions; College World Series champions; Final ranking No. 1
1998	Skip Bertman	48–19	21–9	2nd	SEC West Champions; Final ranking No. 3
1999	Skip Bertman	41–24–1	18–11–1	3rd	Final ranking No. 14
2000	Skip Bertman	52–17	19–10	2nd	SEC West Champions; SEC tournament champions; College World Series champions; Final ranking No. 1
2001	Skip Bertman	44–22–1	18–12	2nd	SEC West Champions; Final ranking No. 10
2002	Smoke Laval	44–22	19–10	4th	Final ranking No. 11
2003	Smoke Laval	45–22–1	20–9–1	1st	SEC West Champions; SEC Champions; Final ranking No. 7
2004	Smoke Laval	46–19	18–12	3rd	Final ranking No. 8
2005	Smoke Laval	40–22	18–12	3rd	SEC West Champions; Final ranking No. 19
2006	Smoke Laval	35–24	13–17	8th	
2007	Paul Mainieri	29–26–1	12–17–1	10th	
2008	Paul Mainieri	49–19–1	18–11–1	2nd	SEC West Champions; SEC tournament champions; Final ranking No. 6
2009	Paul Mainieri	56–17	20–10	1st	SEC West Champions; SEC Champions; SEC tournament champions; College World Series champions; Final ranking No. 1
2010	Paul Mainieri	41–22	14–16	8th	SEC tournament champions
2011	Paul Mainieri	36–20	13–17	9th	
2012	Paul Mainieri	47–18	19–11	1st	SEC West Champions; SEC Champions
2013	Paul Mainieri	57–11	23–7	2nd	SEC West Champions; SEC tournament champions; Final ranking No. 4
2014	Paul Mainieri	46–16–1	17–11–1	3rd	SEC tournament champions; Final ranking No. 22
2015	Paul Mainieri	54–12	21–8	1st	SEC West Champions; SEC Champions; Final ranking No. 5
2016	Paul Mainieri	45–21	19–11	5th	Final ranking No. 12
2017	Paul Mainieri	52–20	21–9	1st	SEC West Champions; SEC Co-champions; SEC tournament champions; Final ranking No. 2
2018	Paul Mainieri	39–27	15–15	8th	
2019	Paul Mainieri	40–26	17–13	5th	Final ranking No. 14
2020	Paul Mainieri	12–5	–	–	Season canceled due to the COVID-19 pandemic
2021	Paul Mainieri	38–25	13–17	9th	Final ranking No. 15
2022	Jay Johnson	40–22	17–13	4th	Final ranking No. 23
2023	Jay Johnson	54–17	19–10	3rd	College World Series champions; Final ranking No. 1
2024	Jay Johnson	43–23	13–17	11th	
2025	Jay Johnson	53–15	19–11	3rd	College World Series champions; Final ranking No. 1

*Through the end of the 2025 season.
*Final Rankings are from Collegiate Baseball Division I Final Polls (1959–2025)

== LSU in the NCAA tournament ==
- The NCAA Division I baseball tournament started in 1947.
- The format of the tournament has changed through the years.

Year	Record	Pct	Notes
			LSU did not make the tournament from 1947 to 1974; NOTE: LSU was invited to play in the 1961 NCAA tournament as SEC champion, but declined.
1975	1–2	.333	Eliminated by Miami in the South Regional semifinals
			LSU did not make the tournament from 1976 to 1984
1985	0–2	.000	Eliminated by Lamar in NCAA Central Regional
1986	5–2	.714	Won NCAA South I Regional; College World Series (5th place)
1987	6–2	.750	Won NCAA South II Regional; College World Series (4th place)
			LSU did not make the tournament in 1988
1989	7–3	.700	Won the NCAA Central Regional; College World Series (3rd place)
1990	7–3	.700	Won the NCAA South I Regional; College World Series (3rd place)
1991	8–0	1.000	Won the NCAA South Regional; College World Series champions
1992	2–2	.500	Eliminated by Cal St. Fullerton in the NCAA South II Regional semifinals
1993	8–2	.800	Won the NCAA South Regional; College World Series champions
1994	4–2	.667	Won the NCAA South Regional; College World Series (7th place)
1995	2–2	.500	Eliminated by Rice in NCAA South Regional semifinals
1996	8–0	1.000	Won the NCAA South II Regional; College World Series champions
1997	9–1	.900	Won the NCAA South I Regional; College World Series champions
1998	6–2	.750	Won the NCAA South II Regional; College World Series (3rd place)
1999	4–3	.571	Won the Baton Rouge Regional; Eliminated by Alabama in the Tuscaloosa Super Regional
2000	9–0	1.000	Won the Baton Rouge Regional; Won the Baton Rouge Super Regional vs. UCLA; College World Series champions
2001	4–3	.571	Won the Baton Rouge Regional; Eliminated by Tulane in the Metairie Super Regional
2002	4–3	.571	Won the Baton Rouge Regional; Eliminated by Rice in the Houston Super Regional
2003	5–3	.625	Won the Baton Rouge Regional; Won the Baton Rouge Super Regional vs. Baylor; College World Series (7th place)
2004	5–2	.714	Won the Baton Rouge Regional; Won the Baton Rouge Super Regional vs. Texas A&M; College World Series (7th place)
2005	2–2	.500	Eliminated by Rice in Baton Rouge Regional Finals
			LSU did not make the tournament in 2006 and 2007
2008	6–3	.667	Won the Baton Rouge Regional; Won the Baton Rouge Super Regional vs. UC Irvine; College World Series (5th place)
2009	10–1	.909	Won the Baton Rouge Regional; Won the Baton Rouge Super Regional vs. Rice; College World Series; Won College World Series Final 2–1 vs. Texas
2010	1–2	.333	Eliminated by UCI in the Los Angeles Regional
			LSU did not make the tournament in 2011
2012	4–2	.667	Won the Baton Rouge Regional; Eliminated by Stony Brook in the Baton Rouge Super Regional
2013	5–2	.714	Won the Baton Rouge Regional; Won the Baton Rouge Super Regional vs. Oklahoma; College World Series (7th place)
2014	2–2	.500	Eliminated by Houston in the Baton Rouge Regional Final
2015	6–2	.750	Won the Baton Rouge Regional; Won the Baton Rouge Super Regional vs. Louisiana-Lafayette; College World Series (5th place)
2016	3–3	.500	Won the Baton Rouge Regional; Eliminated by Coastal Carolina in the Baton Rouge Super Regional
2017	9–3	.750	Won the Baton Rouge Regional; Won the Baton Rouge Super Regional vs. Mississippi State; College World Series; Lost College World Series Final 2–0 vs. Florida
2018	2–2	.500	Eliminated by Oregon State in the Corvallis Regional Final
2019	3–2	.600	Won the Baton Rouge Regional; Eliminated by Florida State in the Baton Rouge Super Regional
			Tournament not held in 2020 due to the COVID-19 pandemic
2021	4–3	.571	Won the Eugene Regional; Eliminated by Tennessee in the Knoxville Super Regional
2022	2–2	.500	Eliminated by Southern Miss in the Hattiesburg Regional Final
2023	11–2	.846	Won the Baton Rouge Regional; Won the Baton Rouge Super Regional vs. Kentucky; College World Series; Won College World Series Final 2–1 vs. Florida
2024	3–2	.600	Eliminated by North Carolina in the Chapel Hill Regional Final
2025	10-1	.909	Won the Baton Rouge Regional; Won the Baton Rouge Super Regional vs. West Virginia; College World Series; Won College World Series Final 2–0 vs. Coastal Carolina
Total	187–75	.714	Total NCAA tournament Appearances: 37

- College World Series: 46–29 (.613)
- NCAA Super Regionals: 20–16 (.556)
- NCAA Regionals: 111–29 (.791)

== NCAA records ==
=== Individual records ===
Year	Player	Record	Notes
1959	Butch Mixon	Strikeouts in a game (24)	April 28, 1959, against ULL; No. 2 all-time
1962	Fred Southerland	Fewest hits allowed per 9 innings (4.07)	Minimum of 50 innings pitched; No. 5 for 1962 season
1967	Bruce Baudier	Perfect Game (7 Innings)	May 5, 1967, against Alabama
2009	Matty Ott	Saves (16)	2009 Season.
1993	Todd Walker	Runs Batted In (102)	Led the Nation in 1993
1993	Todd Walker	Total Bases (214)	Led the Nation in 1993
1995–1998	Eddy Furniss	Home runs in a career (80)	No. 4 All-Time
1995–1998	Eddy Furniss	Total bases in a career (689)	No. 3 All-Time
1996	Eddy Furniss	Runs Batted In (103)	Led the Nation in 1996
1996	Eddy Furniss	Home runs (26)	(t)1st in the Nation in 1996
1997	Brandon Larson	Home runs in a season (40)	No. 4 All-Time; No. 2 in 1997
2000	Brad Cresse	Runs Batted In (106)	Led the Nation in 2000
2000	Brad Cresse	Total Bases (217)	Led the Nation in 2000
2000	Brad Cresse	Home runs (30)	Led the Nation in 2000
2000	Brad Hawpe	Doubles in a season (36)	No. 1 All-Time; Led the Nation in 2000
2008	Matt Clark	Home runs (28)	(t)1st in 2008 with Gordon Beckham
2023	Paul Skenes	Strikeouts (209)	Led the Nation in 2023; Most in SEC History.
2023	Dylan Crews	Runs Scored (100)	Led the Nation in 2023
2023	Tommy White	Runs Batted In (105)	(t)1st in the Nation in 2023
2024	Tommy White	Home runs in a career (75)	No. 8 All-Time
2025	Kade Anderson	Strikeouts (180)	Led the Nation in 2025

=== Team records ===
Year	Record	Notes
1996	Hits in the 7th Inning (13)	May 26, 1996, against Georgia Tech
1996	Doubles in an Inning (8)	May 26, 1996, against Georgia Tech
1996–1998	Consecutive Games with a Home run (77)	From June 8, 1996, to February 21, 1998
1997	Home runs in a Season (188)	LSU played 70 games that season
1997	Home runs per game (2.69)	LSU played 70 games that season
2023	Total Team Strikeouts Pitched (798)	LSU played 71 games that season
Source:"Official 2007 NCAA Baseball Records Book" (PDF). ncaa.org. Archived from the original (PDF) on December 3, 2007.

== National College Baseball Hall of Fame inductees ==
=== Players ===
Player	Position	Career	Induction
Ben McDonald	P	1987–89	2008
Todd Walker	2B	1992–94	2009
Eddy Furniss	1B	1996–98	2010

=== Coaches ===
Player	Position	Career	Induction
Skip Bertman	Head coach	1984–2001	2006

== Retired numbers ==
No.	Member	Position	Career	Year No. Retired
15	Skip Bertman	Head coach	1984–2001	2010
19	Ben McDonald	P	1987–1989	2010
36	Eddy Furniss	1B	1994–1997	2016
12	Todd Walker	2B	1992–1994	2017

== Player awards ==
=== National award winners ===
- Dick Howser Trophy

Eddy Furniss (1998)
Paul Skenes (2023)

- Golden Spikes Award

Ben McDonald (1989)
Dylan Crews (2023)

- Brooks Wallace Award

Alex Bregman (2013)

- Collegiate Baseball Player of the Year

Ben McDonald (1989)
Lloyd Peever (1992)

- Johnny Bench Award

Brad Cresse (2000)

- Pitcher of the Year Award

Aaron Nola (2014)
Paul Skenes (2023)

- Rotary Smith Award

Ben McDonald (1989)

=== First-team All-Americans ===
The following is a listing of the selections listed in the 2015 LSU Baseball Media Guide on LSUsports.net.

- 1961

Allen Smith (P) – ABCA

- 1974

Mike Miley (2B) – Sporting News

- 1988

Ben McDonald (P) – Baseball America

- 1989

Ben McDonald (P) – Consensus

- 1990

Wes Grisham (OF) – Baseball America

- 1992

Lloyd Peever (P) – Consensus

- 1993

Brett Laxton (P) – NCBWA
Todd Walker (2B) – Consensus

- 1994

Russ Johnson (SS) – NCBWA
Todd Walker (2B) – Consensus

- 1995

Scott Schultz (P) – NCBWA

- 1996

Eddy Furniss (1B) – Consensus
Eddie Yarnall (P) – Baseball America, NCBWA

- 1997

Patrick Coogan (P) – NCBWA
Brandon Larson (SS) – ABCA, Baseball American, NCBWA, Sporting News

- 1998

Brad Cresse (C) – Sporting News
Eddy Furniss (1B) – Consensus

- 1999

Kurt Ainsworth (P) – Baseball America

- 2000

Brad Cresse (C) – Consensus

- 2003

Aaron Hill (SS) – Baseball America

- 2004

Jon Zeringue (OF) – NCBWA, USA Today/Sports Weekly

- 2005

Ryan Patterson (OF) – NCBWA, USA Today/Sports Weekly

- 2008

Blake Dean (OF) – Baseball America

- 2009

Louis Coleman (P) – Consensus

- 2011

Mikie Mahtook (OF) – ABCA, Baseball America

- 2012

Kevin Gausman (P) – ABCA, Collegiate Baseball, Perfect Game
Raph Rhymes (OF) – ABCA, Collegiate Baseball, NCBWA

- 2013

Mason Katz (1B) – NCBWA
Aaron Nola (P) – NCBWA, Baseball America, Perfect Game, ABCA
Alex Bregman (SS) – Baseball America, Perfect Game, ABCA

- 2015

Alex Bregman (SS) – Baseball America

- 2017

Greg Deichmann (OF) – Consensus

- 2022

Dylan Crews (OF) – Consensus

- 2023

Dylan Crews (OF) – Consensus
Paul Skenes (P) – Consensus
Tommy White (OF) – Consensus

=== National Freshmen of the Year ===
The following is a listing of LSU players selected as national freshmen of the year.

- 1992

Todd Walker (2B) Baseball America

- 1993

Brett Laxton (P) Baseball America

- 2000

Mike Fontenot (2B) Collegiate Baseball

- 2001

Lane Mestepey (P) Collegiate Baseball

- 2013

Alex Bregman (SS) Collegiate Baseball, NCBWA, Baseball America, Perfect Game

- 2015

Alex Lange (P) Louisville Slugger, NCBWA

- 2021

Dylan Crews (OF) Perfect Game

- 2025

Derek Curiel (SS) D1 Baseball

=== SEC award winners ===
- Player of the Year Award

Russ Johnson (1993)
Todd Walker (1994)
Eddy Furniss (1996)
Aaron Hill (2003)
Jon Zeringue (2004)
Raph Rhymes (2012)
Dylan Crews (2022,2023)

- Pitcher of the Year

Louis Coleman (2009)
Aaron Nola (2013, 2014)
Paul Skenes (2023)
Kade Anderson (2025)

- Freshman of the Year Award

Mike Fontenot (2000)
Lane Mestepey (2001)
Matty Ott (2009)
Alex Bregman (2013)
Alex Lange (2015)

=== All College World Series Tournament Team ===
The following is a listing of LSU players that were selected to the all-tournament teams during the College World Series.

- 1987

Gregg Patterson (P)

- 1988

Tim Clark (OF)
Lyle Mouton (OF)

- 1991

Chad Ogea (P)
Gary Hymel (C)^*
Lyle Mouton (OF)*
John Tellechea (1B)

- 1993

Adrian Antonini (C)
Jim Greely (OF)
Brett Laxton (P)
Armando Ríos (OF)
Mike Sirotka (P)
Todd Walker (2B)^*

- 1994

Todd Walker (2B)*

- 1996

Justin Bowles (OF)
Tim Lanier (C)
Eddie Yarnall (P)

- 1997

Tom Bernhardt (OF)
Eddy Furniss (1B)
Brandon Larson (SS)

- 1998

Cedrick Harris (OF)

- 2000

Blair Barbier (3B)
Mike Fontenot (2B)
Brad Hawpe (1B)
Trey Hodges (P)^
Ryan Theriot (SS)

- 2009

D. J. LeMahieu (2B)
Jared Mitchell (OF)^
Anthony Ranaudo (P)
Ryan Schimpf (OF)

- 2015

Kade Scivicque (C)

- 2017

Antoine Duplantis (OF)
Michael Papierski (C)

- 2023

Paul Skenes (P)^
Ty Floyd (P)
Tre' Morgan (1B)
Gavin Dugas (2B)
Tommy White (3B)
Dylan Crews (OF)
Cade Beloso (DH)

- 2025

Kade Anderson (P)^
Jared Jones (1B)
Steven Milam (SS)
Derek Curiel (OF)

Legend

- ^ denotes player was named MOP of the College World Series
  - denotes selection to College World Series All-Decade team

== National team members ==
Player	Position	Years at LSU	Olympic year
Ben McDonald	P	1987–1989	1988
Rick Greene	P	1990–1992	1992
Warren Morris	2B	1993–1996	1996
Jason Williams	SS	1993–1996	1996
Kurt Ainsworth	P	1997–1999	2000

== Coaches awards ==
=== National Coach of the Year ===
Coach	Years
Skip Bertman	1986, 1991, 1993, 1996, 1997, 2000
Paul Mainieri	2008, 2009, 2015
Jay Johnson	2023,2025

== National team coaches ==
Coach	Position	Years at LSU	Olympic year
Skip Bertman	Head coach	1984–2001	1988 (asst. coach), 1996 (HC)
Paul Mainieri	Head coach	2007–2021	2018

== LSU and MLB ==
The LSU Tigers baseball team has had 279 players reach Major League Baseball (MLB). This including 23 first round picks, with Ben McDonald as the first #1 overall pick from LSU in the 1989 draft. The 2023 draft featured Paul Skenes becoming the second player from LSU to go #1 overall along with his teammate Dylan Crews being taken with #2 pick, marking the only time two players from the same school were drafted with the first two overall picks.

== See also ==
- List of NCAA Division I baseball programs
