= Skip Bertman =

American baseball player and coach (1938–2026)

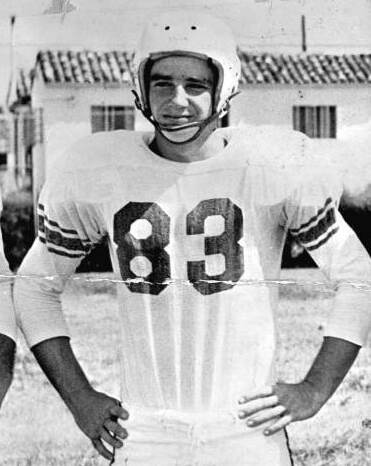
- Bertman as a football player at Miami Beach High School

Biographical details
- Born: May 23, 1938; Detroit, Michigan, U.S.
- Died: August 14, 2026 (aged 88); Baton Rouge, Louisiana, U.S.

Playing career
- 1958–1960: Miami (FL)
- Positions: Outfielder, catcher

Coaching career (HC unless noted)
- 1965–1975: Miami Beach HS (FL)
- 1976–1983: Miami (FL) (associate head coach/recruiting coordinator/pitching coach)
- 1984–2001: LSU

Administrative career (AD unless noted)
- 2001–2008: LSU

Head coaching record
- Overall: 870–330–3
- Tournaments: 89–29

Accomplishments and honors

Championships
- 5× College World Series (1991, 1993, 1996, 1997, 2000); 7× SEC (1986, 1990–1993, 1996, 1997)

Awards
- 2× Baseball America Coach of the Year (1986, 1996); 5× Collegiate Baseball Coach of the Year (1991, 1993, 1996, 1997, 2000); 7× SEC Coach of the Year (1986, 1990–1993, 1996, 1997)
- College Baseball Hall of Fame; Inducted in 2006

J. Stanley "Skip" Bertman (May 23, 1938 – August 14, 2026) was an American college baseball coach and athletic director at Louisiana State University (LSU). He led the LSU Tigers baseball team to five College World Series championships and seven Southeastern Conference (SEC) championships in 18 years as head coach. He amassed 870 wins, 330 losses, and three ties for a .724 winning percentage. His .754 winning percentage in NCAA baseball tournament competition is the highest among head coaches in college baseball history.

== Early years and playing career ==
Bertman was born in Detroit on May 23, 1938. He grew up in Miami Beach and spent his collegiate playing days as an outfielder and catcher at the University of Miami, in Coral Gables, Florida, from 1958 to 1960. While a player at Miami, Bertman earned his B.A. in health and physical education. He later received his master's degree from Miami in health, physical education and recreation in 1964.

== Coaching career ==
=== Miami ===
In 11 seasons as head baseball coach at Miami Beach High School, Bertman's team won a state championship and was state runner-up twice. Bertman was named Florida High School Coach of the Year three times. Based in part on these coaching credentials, Bertman went on to work as recruiting coordinator, pitching coach and associate head coach at the University of Miami for eight seasons (1976–1983) under Ron Fraser. During this time, the Hurricanes won the national championship in 1982. In that 1982 College World Series, Bertman orchestrated one of the most famous plays in college baseball history—a phantom pickoff play known as the "Grand Illusion" which resulted in Wichita State's Phil Stephenson being thrown out at second base.

=== LSU ===
Bertman was hired by athletic director Bob Brodhead to coach LSU in 1983, and he transformed LSU into a baseball powerhouse, guiding the Tigers to 16 NCAA tournament appearances, 11 College World Series appearances, seven Southeastern Conference (SEC) championships, and five NCAA baseball national championships in 18 seasons. LSU won its first two College World Series (CWS) titles in 1991 and 1993, each time defeating Wichita State in the championship game. In 1996, LSU defeated Bertman's alma mater Miami for its third national title. Its fourth title came in 1997 with a 13–6 victory over Alabama in an all-SEC championship final. LSU defeated Stanford in the 2000 championship game for Bertman's fifth and final CWS title.

While at LSU, Bertman was honored as the Collegiate Baseball Coach of the Year five times, Baseball America Coach of the Year twice, and the SEC Coach of the Year seven times, including four straight from 1990 to 1993. Bertman's teams also drew large crowds to LSU's Alex Box Stadium, as the Tigers led the nation in collegiate baseball attendance in each of his final six seasons (1996–2001).

=== United States national team ===
Bertman served as an assistant coach for the United States national baseball team which finished in first place at the 1988 Summer Olympics, where baseball was a demonstration sport. He then served as head coach of the national team in 1995 and 1996, which captured the bronze medal in the 1996 Summer Olympics by defeating Nicaragua, 10–3.

== Administrative career ==
Bertman was named LSU's athletics director on January 19, 2001, responsible for an athletic budget of $52 million. He succeeded Joe Dean, a former Tiger basketball standout who held the position for 14 years.

On June 4, 2006, Bertman's successor as LSU's baseball coach, Raymond "Smoke" Laval resigned after the Tigers went 35–24 overall and 13–17 in the SEC, failing to reach the NCAA tournament for the first time since 1988. Laval led the Tigers to the College World Series in 2003 and 2004, but tailed off in his final two seasons, losing the 2005 regional championship game at home to Rice.

He speculated that he would consider a return to the dugout if he could not find a suitable candidate to replace Laval after the 2006 season, but the job was eventually given to Notre Dame coach Paul Mainieri. Mainieri led the Tigers to the 2009 College World Series championship, the sixth baseball national championship in school history and the first not won with Bertman as head coach.

Bertman presided over two football national championship seasons as athletic director. The Tigers won the 2003 BCS championship under coach Nick Saban. When Saban left at the end of the 2004 season to coach the Miami Dolphins of the National Football League, Bertman moved quickly to hire Oklahoma State coach Les Miles. Miles led LSU to a consensus national championship in 2007.

Other success in Bertman's tenure included five consecutive trips to the NCAA women's basketball Final Four (2004–2008) under four different coaches, an appearance in the men's basketball Final Four in 2006, a trip to the Women's College World Series in softball in 2004, and six NCAA outdoor track championships (three men's and three women's).

The LSU Board of Supervisors approved Bertman's three-year contract extension. Bertman's new extension, which was approved without discussion, called for him to be paid $425,000 annually beginning July 1, 2007, and ending June 30, 2010. Bertman, who had served as athletic director since leaving his coaching position after the 2001 baseball season, stepped down in 2008 to become athletic director emeritus as dictated by his contract. As athletic director emeritus, Bertman's role primarily involved fundraising.

== Death ==
Bertman died in Baton Rouge on August 14, 2026, at the age of 88.

== Achievements ==
- Bertman led Team USA to a bronze medal in the 1996 Summer Olympic Games. The team finished the Olympic Games with a 6–1 record and a victory over Nicaragua.
- 11 College World Series appearances: 1986, 1987, 1989–1991, 1993, 1994, 1996–1998, 2000
- Five College World Series championships: 1991, 1993, 1996, 1997, 2000
- Seven Southeastern Conference championships: 1986, 1990–1993, 1996, 1997
- Career record: 870–330–3 (.724)
- NCAA tournament record: 89–29 (.754), highest winning percentage in NCAA history
- 2× Baseball America Coach of the Year: 1986, 1996
- 5× Collegiate Baseball Coach of the Year: 1991, 1993, 1996, 1997, 2000
- 7× SEC Coach of the Year: 1986, 1990–1993, 1996, 1997

== Honors ==
Bertman was inducted into the University of Miami Sports Hall of Fame in 1994. He was inducted into the Louisiana Sports Hall of Fame in 2002 and the LSU Athletic Hall of Fame in 2011. He was elected to the American Baseball Coaches Association Hall of Fame in 2003, and was a member of the inaugural class of the College Baseball Hall of Fame in 2006. In a Baseball America poll published in 1999, Bertman was voted the second greatest college baseball coach of the 20th century, behind Rod Dedeaux of USC.

In 2001, the section of South Stadium Drive between River Road and Nicholson Drive—site of the original Alex Box Stadium—was renamed Skip Bertman Drive. Bertman's No. 15 jersey was also retired by the LSU baseball team. On May 17, 2013, during a pre-game ceremony that also celebrated the 20th anniversary of Bertman's 1993 National Championship team, the field at Alex Box Stadium was officially dedicated "Skip Bertman Field." The stadium itself was renamed to Alex Box Stadium, Skip Bertman Field.

== Head coaching record ==
Record table
| Season | Team | Overall | Conference | Standing | Postseason |
|---|---|---|---|---|---|
LSU Tigers (Southeastern Conference) (1984–2001)
| 1984 | LSU | 32–23 | 12–12 | 3rd | |
| 1985 | LSU | 41–18 | 17–7 | T–1st | NCAA Regional |
| 1986 | LSU | 55–14 | 22–5 | 1st | College World Series |
| 1987 | LSU | 49–19 | 12–10 | 5th | College World Series |
| 1988 | LSU | 39–21 | 16–11 | 5th | |
| 1989 | LSU | 55–17 | 18–9 | 2nd | College World Series |
| 1990 | LSU | 54–19 | 20–7 | 1st | College World Series |
| 1991 | LSU | 55–18 | 19–7 | 1st | College World Series Champions |
| 1992 | LSU | 50–16 | 18–6 | 1st | NCAA Regional |
| 1993 | LSU | 53–17–1 | 18–8–1 | 1st | College World Series Champions |
| 1994 | LSU | 46–20 | 21–6 | 2nd | College World Series |
| 1995 | LSU | 47–18 | 17–12 | 5th | NCAA Regional |
| 1996 | LSU | 52–15 | 20–10 | 1st | College World Series Champions |
| 1997 | LSU | 57–13 | 22–7 | 1st | College World Series Champions |
| 1998 | LSU | 48–19 | 21–9 | 2nd | College World Series |
| 1999 | LSU | 41–24–1 | 18–11–1 | 3rd | Super Regional |
| 2000 | LSU | 52–17 | 19–10 | 2nd | College World Series Champions |
| 2001 | LSU | 44–22–1 | 18–12 | 2nd | Super Regional |
| LSU: | | 870–330–3 (.724) | 328–159–2 (.673) | | |
| Total: | | 870–330–3 (.724) | | | |
National champion Postseason invitational champion Conference regular season champion Conference regular season and conference tournament champion Division regular season champion Division regular season and conference tournament champion Conference tournament champion
