= 2004 LSU Tigers baseball team =

American college baseball season

2004 LSU Tigers baseball

NCAA Baton Rouge Regional champions NCAA Baton Rouge Super Regional champions SEC Tournament co-champions SEC champions

College World Series, 2–2
- Conference: Southeastern Conference
- Record: 54–19 (20–7 SEC)
- Head coach: Smoke Laval (3rd year)
- Home stadium: Alex Box Stadium

2004 Southeastern Conference baseball standings
	Conf.				Overall
Team	W		L	PCT	W		L	PCT
Eastern
No. 4 Georgia ^{x}‍†‍‍^{y}	19	–	11	.633	45	–	23	.662
No. 3 South Carolina ‍‍‡‍^{y}	17	–	13	.567	53	–	17	.757
No. 18 Florida ‍‍‍^{y}	17	–	13	.567	43	–	22	.662
No. 17 Vanderbilt ‍‍‍^{y}	16	–	14	.533	45	–	19	.703
Tennessee ‍‍‍^{y}	14	–	16	.467	38	–	24	.613
Kentucky ‍‍‍	7	–	23	.233	24	–	30	.444
Western
No. 7 Arkansas ^{x}‍†‍‍^{y}	19	–	11	.633	45	–	24	.652
No. 8 LSU ‍‍‍^{y}	18	–	12	.600	46	–	19	.708
No. 24 Ole Miss ‍‍‍^{y}	18	–	12	.600	39	–	21	.650
Mississippi State ‍‍‍^{y}	13	–	17	.433	35	–	24	.593
Auburn ‍‍‍	12	–	18	.400	32	–	24	.571
Alabama ‍‍‍	10	–	20	.333	29	–	26	.527
x – Division champion † – Conference champion ‡ – Tournament champion y – Invited to the NCAA tournament As of June 30, 2004; Rankings from Collegiate Baseball

The 2004 LSU Tigers baseball team represented Louisiana State University in the 2004 NCAA Division I baseball season. The Tigers played their home games at Alex Box Stadium, and played as part of the Southeastern Conference. The team was coached by Smoke Laval in his third season as head coach at LSU.

The Tigers finished second in the SEC West, swept the Baton Rouge Regional and Super Regional, then reached the College World Series, their thirteenth appearance in Omaha, where they were eliminated after a pair of losses to Miami (FL) and South Carolina.

== Personnel ==
=== Roster ===
2004 LSU Tigers roster
Pitchers: 6 - Collin Smith - Junior; 8 - Brandon Nall - Junior; 13 - Clay Dirks - Freshman; 27 - Greg Smith - Sophomore; 28 - Michael Bonura - Freshman; 29 - Jordan Faircloth - Junior; 33 - Jason Determann - Sophomore; 35 - Justin Meier - Sophomore; 36 - Kody Bumpous - Freshman; 41 - Nate Bumstead - Senior; 46 - Lane Mestepey - Junior; 47 - Will Goodwin - Freshman; 48 - Matt Greenwich - Freshman; 51 - Chris McDougall - Sophomore	Catchers: 9 - Dustin Weaver - Junior; 10 - Ty Jensen - Senior; 14 - Matt Liuzza - Sophomore; 38 - Brad Bass - Junior; 43 - Nick Stavinoha - Junior; 52 - Will Davis - Freshman; Outfielders: 1 - J.C. Holt - Junior; 12 - Ryan Patterson - Junior; 16 - Jon Zeringue - Junior; 24 - Bruce Sprowl - Junior; 32 - Rhett Buteau - Junior; 40 - Quinn Stewart - Junior; 44 - Steven Broschofsky - Freshman	Infielders: 2 - Derek Hebert - Junior; 3 - Blake Gill - Junior; 4 - Bryan Harris - Sophomore; 7 - Ivan Naccarata - Senior; 21 - Clay Harris - Junior; 25 - Will Harris - Sophomore; 30 - Bobby DiLiberto - Junior; 34 - Matt Horwath - Freshman; 50 - Jordan Mayer - Freshman

=== Coaches ===
2004 LSU Tigers baseball coaching staff
- Smoke Laval - Head coach - 3rd Season
- Jody Autery - Assistant coach
- Turtle Thomas - Assistant coach
- Brady Wiederhold - Assistant coach

== Schedule and results ==
Legend
LSU win
LSU loss

2004 LSU Tigers baseball game log
Regular season

February
Date	Opponent	Rank	Site/Stadium	Score	Overall Record	SEC Record
Feb 13	at UCF*	No. 3	Jay Bergman Field • Orlando, FL	W 4–3^{10}	1–0	
Feb 14	at UCF*	No. 3	Jay Bergman Field • Orlando, FL	W 17–4	2–0	
Feb 15	at UCF*	No. 3	Jay Bergman Field • Orlando, FL	L 5–6^{10}	2–1	
Feb 17	Louisiana–Monroe*	No. 4	Alex Box Stadium • Baton Rouge, LA	W 7–1	3–1	
Feb 20	Jacksonville State*	No. 4	Alex Box Stadium • Baton Rouge, LA	W 6–1	4–1	
Feb 21	Jacksonville State*	No. 4	Alex Box Stadium • Baton Rouge, LA	W 14–2	5–1	
Feb 22	Jacksonville State*	No. 4	Alex Box Stadium • Baton Rouge, LA	W 19–1^{7}	6–1	
Feb 27	Texas State*	No. 1	Alex Box Stadium • Baton Rouge, LA	W 10–1	7–1	
Feb 28	Texas State*	No. 1	Alex Box Stadium • Baton Rouge, LA	W 2–1	8–1	
Feb 29	Texas State*	No. 1	Alex Box Stadium • Baton Rouge, LA	W 13–2	9–1	

March
Date	Opponent	Rank	Site/Stadium	Score	Overall Record	SEC Record
Mar 2	vs No. 13 Tulane*	No. 1	Zephyr Field • Metairie, LA	W 6–0	10–1	
Mar 5	Houston*	No. 1	Alex Box Stadium • Baton Rouge, LA	W 9–3	11–1	
Mar 6	Houston*	No. 1	Alex Box Stadium • Baton Rouge, LA	L 5–10	11–2	
Mar 7	Houston*	No. 1	Alex Box Stadium • Baton Rouge, LA	W 8–2	12–2	
Mar 9	at Louisiana–Monroe*	No. 1	Warhawk Field • Monroe, LA	W 6–1	13–2	
Mar 12	Southeastern Louisiana*	No. 1	Alex Box Stadium • Baton Rouge, LA	W 7–1	14–2	
Mar 13	Southeastern Louisiana*	No. 1	Alex Box Stadium • Baton Rouge, LA	W 5–1	15–2	
Mar 16	New Orleans*	No. 1	Alex Box Stadium • Baton Rouge, LA	W 14–0^{7}	16–2	
Mar 19	at No. 4 South Carolina	No. 1	Sarge Frye Field • Columbia, SC	W 6–3^{11}	17–2	1–0
Mar 20	at No. 4 South Carolina	No. 1	Sarge Frye Field • Columbia, SC	L 5–12	17–3	1–1
Mar 21	at No. 4 South Carolina	No. 1	Sarge Frye Field • Columbia, SC	W 12–7	18–3	2–1
Mar 23	at Centenary*	No. 1	Shehee Stadium • Shreveport, LA	W 9–3	19–3	
Mar 26	No. 24 Mississippi State	No. 1	Alex Box Stadium • Baton Rouge, LA	L 3–7	19–4	2–2
Mar 27	No. 24 Mississippi State	No. 1	Alex Box Stadium • Baton Rouge, LA	W 11–6	20–4	3–2
Mar 28	No. 24 Mississippi State	No. 1	Alex Box Stadium • Baton Rouge, LA	W 14–3	21–4	4–2
Mar 30	at New Orleans*	No. 2	Maestri Field at Privateer Park • New Orleans, LA	W 12–5	22–4	

April
Date	Opponent	Rank	Site/Stadium	Score	Overall Record	SEC Record
Apr 2	at No. 15 Auburn	No. 2	Plainsman Park • Auburn, AL	L 6–7^{10}	22–5	4–3
Apr 3	at No. 15 Auburn	No. 2	Plainsman Park • Auburn, AL	W 5–3	23–5	5–3
Apr 4	at No. 15 Auburn	No. 2	Plainsman Park • Auburn, AL	W 3–2	24–5	6–3
Apr 6	No. 22 Tulane*	No. 2	Alex Box Stadium • Baton Rouge, LA	L 0–1	24–6	
Apr 9	Arkansas	No. 2	Alex Box Stadium • Baton Rouge, LA	L 8–11	24–7	6–4
Apr 10	Arkansas	No. 2	Alex Box Stadium • Baton Rouge, LA	L 10–11^{10}	24–8	6–5
Apr 11	Arkansas	No. 2	Alex Box Stadium • Baton Rouge, LA	L 5–7	24–9	6–6
Apr 13	Nicholls State*	No. 12	Alex Box Stadium • Baton Rouge, LA	W 9–3	25–9	
Apr 14	vs Southeastern Louisiana*	No. 12	Zephyr Field • Metairie, LA	W 9–3	26–9	
Apr 16	Georgia	No. 12	Alex Box Stadium • Baton Rouge, LA	W 6–5^{10}	27–9	7–6
Apr 17	Georgia	No. 12	Alex Box Stadium • Baton Rouge, LA	W 10–2	28–9	8–6
Apr 18	Georgia	No. 12	Alex Box Stadium • Baton Rouge, LA	L 4–12	28–10	8–7
Apr 20	at Southern*	No. 8	Lee–Hines Field • Baton Rouge, LA	W 21–10	29–10	
Apr 23	at No. 10 Tennessee	No. 8	Lindsey Nelson Stadium • Knoxville, TN	L 6–8	29–11	8–8
Apr 24	at No. 10 Tennessee	No. 8	Lindsey Nelson Stadium • Knoxville, TN	W 11–5	30–11	9–8
Apr 25	at No. 10 Tennessee	No. 8	Lindsey Nelson Stadium • Knoxville, TN	W 11–1	31–11	10–8
Apr 27	vs No. 20 Tulane*	No. 6	Louisiana Superdome • New Orleans, LA	W 9–5	32–11	

May
Date	Opponent	Rank	Site/Stadium	Score	Overall Record	SEC Record
May 1	Alabama	No. 6	Alex Box Stadium • Baton Rouge, LA	L 2–8	32–12	10–9
May 2	Alabama	No. 6	Alex Box Stadium • Baton Rouge, LA	W 2–1^{8}	33–12	11–9
May 2	Alabama	No. 6	Alex Box Stadium • Baton Rouge, LA	W 9–2^{7}	34–12	12–9
May 7	at Kentucky	No. 5	Cliff Hagan Stadium • Lexington, KY	L 3–10	34–13	12–10
May 8	at Kentucky	No. 5	Cliff Hagan Stadium • Lexington, KY	W 11–8	35–13	13–10
May 9	at Kentucky	No. 5	Cliff Hagan Stadium • Lexington, KY	W 15–4	36–13	14–10
May 15	Vanderbilt	No. 7	Alex Box Stadium • Baton Rouge, LA	W 3–2^{10}	37–13	15–10
May 15	Vanderbilt	No. 7	Alex Box Stadium • Baton Rouge, LA	W 7–6^{11}	38–13	16–10
May 16	Vanderbilt	No. 7	Alex Box Stadium • Baton Rouge, LA	L 0–8	38–14	16–11
May 19	Southeastern Louisiana*	No. 9	Alex Box Stadium • Baton Rouge, LA	W 16–2	39–14	
May 21	at No. 12 Ole Miss	No. 9	Swayze Field • Oxford, MS	L 6–7	39–15	16–12
May 22	at No. 12 Ole Miss	No. 9	Swayze Field • Oxford, MS	W 11–4	40–15	17–12
May 23	at No. 12 Ole Miss	No. 9	Swayze Field • Oxford, MS	W 14–6	41–15	18–12

Postseason

SEC Tournament
Date	Opponent	Rank (Seed)	Site/Stadium	Score	Overall Record	SECT Record
May 26	No. 25 (6) Florida	No. 11 (3)	Hoover Metropolitan Stadium • Hoover, AL	L 4–5^{10}	41–16	0–1
May 27	No. 10 (2) Georgia	No. 11 (3)	Hoover Metropolitan Stadium • Hoover, AL	L 0–1	41–17	0–2

NCAA Baton Rouge Regional
Date	Opponent	Rank (Seed)	Site/Stadium	Score	Overall Record	Reg Record
June 4	(4) Army	No. 12	Alex Box Stadium • Baton Rouge, LA	W 9–0	42–17	1–0
June 5	No. 25 (2) Southern Miss	No. 12	Alex Box Stadium • Baton Rouge, LA	W 6–2	43–17	2–0
June 6	(3) College of Charleston	No. 12	Alex Box Stadium • Baton Rouge, LA	W 11–3	44–17	3–0

NCAA Baton Rouge Super Regional
Date	Opponent	Rank (Seed)	Site/Stadium	Score	Overall Record	SReg Record
June 12	No. 15 Texas A&M	No. 8	Alex Box Stadium • Baton Rouge, LA	W 11–8	45–17	1–0
June 13	No. 15 Texas A&M	No. 8	Alex Box Stadium • Baton Rouge, LA	W 4–0	46–17	2–0

College World Series
Date	Opponent	Rank (Seed)	Site/Stadium	Score	Overall Record	CWS Record
June 19	No. 1 (3) Miami (FL)	No. 6	Johnny Rosenblatt Stadium • Omaha, NE	L 5–9	46–18	0–1
June 21	No. 7 (2) South Carolina	No. 6	Johnny Rosenblatt Stadium • Omaha, NE	L 4–15	46–19	0–2
