= 2004 South Carolina Gamecocks baseball team =

American college baseball season

2004 South Carolina Gamecocks baseball

SEC Baseball Tournament champion Columbia Regional champions Columbia Super Regional champions

College World Series 3–2
- Conference: Southeastern Conference
- Eastern Division

Ranking
- Coaches: No. 3
- CB: No. 3
- Record: 53–17 (17–13 SEC)
- Head coach: Ray Tanner (8th season)
- Assistant coaches: Jim Toman (8th season); Jerry Meyers (8th season)
- Home stadium: Sarge Frye Field

2004 Southeastern Conference baseball standings
| | Conf. | | | | Overall |
| Team | W | | L | PCT | W | | L | PCT |
|---|---|---|---|---|---|---|---|---|
Eastern
| No. 4 Georgia ^{x}‍†‍‍^{y} | 19 | – | 11 | .633 | 45 | – | 23 | .662 |
| No. 3 South Carolina ‍‍‡‍^{y} | 17 | – | 13 | .567 | 53 | – | 17 | .757 |
| No. 18 Florida ‍‍‍^{y} | 17 | – | 13 | .567 | 43 | – | 22 | .662 |
| No. 17 Vanderbilt ‍‍‍^{y} | 16 | – | 14 | .533 | 45 | – | 19 | .703 |
| Tennessee ‍‍‍^{y} | 14 | – | 16 | .467 | 38 | – | 24 | .613 |
| Kentucky ‍‍‍ | 7 | – | 23 | .233 | 24 | – | 30 | .444 |
Western
| No. 7 Arkansas ^{x}‍†‍‍^{y} | 19 | – | 11 | .633 | 45 | – | 24 | .652 |
| No. 8 LSU ‍‍‍^{y} | 18 | – | 12 | .600 | 46 | – | 19 | .708 |
| No. 24 Ole Miss ‍‍‍^{y} | 18 | – | 12 | .600 | 39 | – | 21 | .650 |
| Mississippi State ‍‍‍^{y} | 13 | – | 17 | .433 | 35 | – | 24 | .593 |
| Auburn ‍‍‍ | 12 | – | 18 | .400 | 32 | – | 24 | .571 |
| Alabama ‍‍‍ | 10 | – | 20 | .333 | 29 | – | 26 | .527 |
x – Division champion † – Conference champion ‡ – Tournament champion y – Invited to the NCAA tournament As of June 30, 2004; Rankings from Collegiate Baseball

The 2004 South Carolina Gamecocks baseball team represented the University of South Carolina in the 2004 NCAA Division I baseball season. The Gamecocks played their home games at Sarge Frye Field. The team was coached by Ray Tanner in his 8th season at South Carolina.

== Roster ==
2004 South Carolina Gamecocks roster
| Pitchers: 23 Aaron Rawl; 3 Matt Campbell; 23 Billy Buckner; 18 Jason Fletcher; 19 Zac McCamie; 38 Arik Hempy; 12 Cliff Donald; 41 Harris Honeycutt | Catchers: 10 Landon Powell; 40 Ryan Mahoney; Infielders: 4 Steve Pearce; 9 Bryan Triplett; 8 Steven Tolleson; 27 Kevin Melillo; 25 Hank Parks; 30 David Cash; 24 Trey McDaniel; 16 Tommy King | Outfielders: 5 Brendon Winn; 7 Michael Campbell; 29 Davy Gregg; 6 Mark Stanley; 28 Nick Gardiner |

=== College World Series lineup ===
Starting lineup
| Name | Position |
|---|---|
| Brian Triplett | Third base |
| Steven Tolleson | Shortstop |
| Steve Pearce | First base |
| Landon Powell | Catcher |
| Kevin Melillo | Second base |
| Brenden Winn | Right field |
| Michael Campbell | Left field |
| Nick Gardiner | Designated hitter |
| Davy Gregg | Center field |

== Schedule and results ==
Legend
| South Carolina win |
| South Carolina loss |
| South Carolina tie |

2004 South Carolina Gamecocks baseball game log (53–17)
Regular season (41–15)
February (9–0)

| Date | Opponent | Site/stadium | Score | Overall Record | SEC Record |
|---|---|---|---|---|---|
| February 13 | Charleston Southern | Sarge Frye Field • Columbia, SC | 3–2 | 1–0 | – |
| February 14 | Charleston Southern | Sarge Frye Field • Columbia, SC | 38–0 | 2–0 | – |
| February 15 | Charleston Southern | Sarge Frye Field • Columbia, SC | 3–0 | 3–0 | – |
| February 20 | UNC Wilmington | Sarge Frye Field • Columbia, SC | 7–4 | 4–0 | – |
| February 21 | UNC Wilmington | Sarge Frye Field • Columbia, SC | 20–3 | 5–0 | – |
| February 22 | UNC Wilmington | Sarge Frye Field • Columbia, SC | 12–0 | 6–0 | – |
| February 28 | vs Duquesne | Sarge Frye Field • Columbia, SC | 20–2 | 7–0 | – |
| February 28 | vs Radford | Sarge Frye Field • Columbia, SC | 11–0 | 8–0 | – |
| February 29 | vs George Mason | Sarge Frye Field • Columbia, SC | 5–0 | 9–0 | – |

March (12–4)

| Date | Opponent | Site/stadium | Score | Overall Record | SEC Record |
|---|---|---|---|---|---|
| March 3 | Furman | Sarge Frye Field • Columbia, SC | 7–4 | 10–0 | – |
| March 6 | Clemson | Sarge Frye Field • Columbia, SC | 5–2 | 11–0 | – |
| March 7 | at Clemson | Beautiful Tiger Field • Clemson, SC | 8–7 | 12–0 | – |
| March 9 | Yale | Sarge Frye Field • Columbia, SC | 6–1 | 13–0 | – |
| March 10 | Yale | Sarge Frye Field • Columbia, SC | 9–2 | 14–0 | – |
| March 12 | Delaware State | Sarge Frye Field • Columbia, SC | 4–2 | 15–0 | – |
| March 13 | Delaware State | Sarge Frye Field • Columbia, SC | 7–0 | 16–0 | – |
| March 14 | Delaware State | Sarge Frye Field • Columbia, SC | 16–3 | 17–0 | – |
| March 16 | Davidson | Sarge Frye Field • Columbia, SC | 10–1 | 18–0 | – |
| March 19 | LSU | Sarge Frye Field • Columbia, SC | 3–6 | 18–1 | 0–1 |
| March 20 | LSU | Sarge Frye Field • Columbia, SC | 12–5 | 19–1 | 1–1 |
| March 21 | LSU | Sarge Frye Field • Columbia, SC | 7–12 | 19–2 | 1–2 |
| March 23 | Wofford | Russell C. King Field • Spartanburg, SC | 12–1 | 20–2 | 1–2 |
| March 26 | at Arkansas | Baum–Walker Stadium • Fayetteville, AR | 3–5 | 20–3 | 1–3 |
| March 27 | at Arkansas | Baum–Walker Stadium • Fayetteville, AR | 4–5 | 20–4 | 1–4 |
| March 28 | at Arkansas | Baum–Walker Stadium • Fayetteville, AR | 10–2 | 21–4 | 2–4 |

April (10–7)

| Date | Opponent | Site/stadium | Score | Overall Record | SEC Record |
|---|---|---|---|---|---|
| April 2 | at Vanderbilt | Hawkins Field • Nashville, TN | 2–6 | 21–5 | 2–5 |
| April 3 | at Vanderbilt | Hawkins Field • Nashville, TN | 6–3 | 22–5 | 3–5 |
| April 4 | at Vanderbilt | Hawkins Field • Nashville, TN | 10–4 | 23–5 | 4–5 |
| April 7 | Clemson | Sarge Frye Field • Columbia, SC | 4–9 | 23–6 | 4–5 |
| April 9 | Florida | Sarge Frye Field • Columbia, SC | 5–4 | 24–6 | 5–5 |
| April 10 | Florida | Sarge Frye Field • Columbia, SC | 8–9 | 24–7 | 5–6 |
| April 11 | Florida | Sarge Frye Field • Columbia, SC | 7–6 | 25–7 | 6–6 |
| April 14 | Clemson | Sarge Frye Field • Columbia, SC | 5–13 | 25–8 | 6–6 |
| April 16 | at Kentucky | Cliff Hagan Stadium • Lexington, KY | 3–6 | 25–9 | 6–7 |
| April 17 | at Kentucky | Cliff Hagan Stadium • Lexington, KY | 6–11 | 25–10 | 6–8 |
| April 18 | at Kentucky | Cliff Hagan Stadium • Lexington, KY | 5–3 | 26–10 | 7–8 |
| April 21 | The Citadel | Sarge Frye Field • Columbia, SC | 5–2 | 27–10 | 7–8 |
| April 23 | Alabama | Sarge Frye Field • Columbia, SC | 6–3 | 28–10 | 8–8 |
| April 24 | Alabama | Sarge Frye Field • Columbia, SC | 4–7 | 28–11 | 8–9 |
| April 25 | Alabama | Sarge Frye Field • Columbia, SC | 1–0 | 29–11 | 9–9 |
| April 28 | Wofford | Sarge Frye Field • Columbia, SC | 3–0 | 30–11 | 9–9 |
| April 30 | Ole Miss | Sarge Frye Field • Columbia, SC | 7–3 | 31–11 | 10–9 |

May (10–4)

| Date | Opponent | Site/stadium | Score | Overall Record | SEC Record |
|---|---|---|---|---|---|
| May 1 | Ole Miss | Sarge Frye Field • Columbia, SC | 1–6 | 31–12 | 10–10 |
| May 2 | Ole Miss | Sarge Frye Field • Columbia, SC | 3–0 | 32–12 | 11–10 |
| May 7 | at Auburn | Plainsman Park • Auburn, AL | 9–12 | 32–13 | 11–11 |
| May 8 | at Auburn | Plainsman Park • Auburn, AL | 3–1 | 33–13 | 12–11 |
| May 9 | at Auburn | Plainsman Park • Auburn, AL | 12–11 | 34–13 | 13–11 |
| May 11 | vs. North Carolina | Fort Mill, SC | 9–4 | 35–13 | 13–11 |
| May 12 | at The Citadel | Joseph P. Riley Jr. Park • Charleston, SC | 6–1 | 36–13 | 13–11 |
| May 14 | Tennessee | Sarge Frye Field • Columbia, SC | 2–1 | 37–13 | 14–11 |
| May 15 | Tennessee | Sarge Frye Field • Columbia, SC | 2–0 | 38–13 | 15–11 |
| May 16 | Tennessee | Sarge Frye Field • Columbia, SC | 12–8 | 39–13 | 16–11 |
| May 19 | Wofford | Sarge Frye Field • Columbia, SC | 5–3 | 40–13 | 16–11 |
| May 21 | at Georgia | Foley Field • Athens, GA | 1–5 | 40–14 | 16–12 |
| May 22 | at Georgia | Foley Field • Athens, GA | 4–6 | 40–15 | 16–13 |
| May 23 | at Georgia | Foley Field • Athens, GA | 8–2 | 41–15 | 17–13 |

Postseason (12–2)
SEC Tournament (4–0)

| Date | Opponent | Site/stadium | Score | Overall Record | SEC Record |
|---|---|---|---|---|---|
| May 26 | vs Ole Miss | Hoover Metropolitan Stadium • Hoover, AL | 7–6 | 42–15 | 17–13 |
| May 27 | vs Tennessee | Hoover Metropolitan Stadium • Hoover, AL | 5–1 | 43–15 | 17–13 |
| May 29 | vs Arkansas | Hoover Metropolitan Stadium • Hoover, AL | 3–2 | 44–15 | 17–13 |
| May 30 | vs Vanderbilt | Hoover Metropolitan Stadium • Hoover, AL | 3–2 | 45–15 | 17–13 |

Columbia Regional (3–0)

| Date | Opponent | Site/stadium | Score | Overall Record | SEC Record |
|---|---|---|---|---|---|
| June 4 | The Citadel | Sarge Frye Field • Columbia, SC | 12–4 | 46–15 | 17–13 |
| June 5 | North Carolina | Sarge Frye Field • Columbia, SC | 5–2 | 47–15 | 17–13 |
| June 6 | North Carolina | Sarge Frye Field • Columbia, SC | 7–6 | 48–15 | 17–13 |

Columbia Super Regional (2–0)

| Date | Opponent | Site/stadium | Score | Overall Record | SEC Record |
|---|---|---|---|---|---|
| June 5 | East Carolina | Sarge Frye Field • Columbia, SC | 4–2 | 49–15 | 17–13 |
| June 6 | East Carolina | Sarge Frye Field • Columbia, SC | 5–3 | 50–15 | 17–13 |

2004 College World Series (3–2)

| Date | Opponent | Site/stadium | Score | Overall Record | SEC Record |
|---|---|---|---|---|---|
| June 19 | vs Cal State Fullerton | Rosenblatt Stadium • Omaha, NE | 0–3 | 50–16 | 17–13 |
| June 21 | vs LSU | Rosenblatt Stadium • Omaha, NE | 15–4 | 51–16 | 17–13 |
| June 22 | vs Miami (FL) | Rosenblatt Stadium • Omaha, NE | 15–11 | 52–16 | 17–13 |
| June 23 | vs Cal State Fullerton | Rosenblatt Stadium • Omaha, NE | 5–3 | 53–16 | 17–13 |
| June 24 | vs Cal State Fullerton | Rosenblatt Stadium • Omaha, NE | 0–4 | 53–17 | 17–13 |

Schedule Source:

== Awards and honors ==
Landon Powell

- All Tournament Team

Steve Pearce

- All Tournament Team

Bryan Triplett

- All Tournament Team

== Gamecocks in the 2004 MLB draft ==
The following members of the South Carolina Gamecocks baseball program were drafted in the 2004 Major League Baseball draft.

| Round | Pick | Player | Position | MLB Club |
|---|---|---|---|---|
| 1 | 24 | Landon Powell | C | Oakland Athletics |
| 1 | 29 | Matt Campbell | P | Kansas City Royals |
| 2 | 55 | Billy Buckner | P | Kansas City Royals |
| 5 | 157 | Kevin Melillo | 2B | Oakland Athletics |
| 6 | 175 | Chad Blackwell | P | Kansas City Royals |
| 12 | 364 | Bryan Triplett | SS | Houston Astros |
| 19 | 555 | Chris Nowak | 3B | Tampa Bay Devil Rays |
| 48 | 1421 | Brad Key | 3B | Cincinnati Reds |
