= 2004 Southeastern Conference baseball tournament =

- Teams: 8
- Format: Two pools of four-team double elimination
- Finals site: Hoover Metropolitan Stadium; Hoover, Alabama
- Champions: South Carolina (1st title)
- Winning coach: Ray Tanner (1st title)
- MVP: Steven Tolleson, Kevin Melillo (South Carolina)
- Attendance: 75,259

2004 Southeastern Conference baseball standings
	Conf.				Overall
Team	W		L	PCT	W		L	PCT
Eastern
No. 4 Georgia ^{x}‍†‍‍^{y}	19	–	11	.633	45	–	23	.662
No. 3 South Carolina ‍‍‡‍^{y}	17	–	13	.567	53	–	17	.757
No. 18 Florida ‍‍‍^{y}	17	–	13	.567	43	–	22	.662
No. 17 Vanderbilt ‍‍‍^{y}	16	–	14	.533	45	–	19	.703
Tennessee ‍‍‍^{y}	14	–	16	.467	38	–	24	.613
Kentucky ‍‍‍	7	–	23	.233	24	–	30	.444
Western
No. 7 Arkansas ^{x}‍†‍‍^{y}	19	–	11	.633	45	–	24	.652
No. 8 LSU ‍‍‍^{y}	18	–	12	.600	46	–	19	.708
No. 24 Ole Miss ‍‍‍^{y}	18	–	12	.600	39	–	21	.650
Mississippi State ‍‍‍^{y}	13	–	17	.433	35	–	24	.593
Auburn ‍‍‍	12	–	18	.400	32	–	24	.571
Alabama ‍‍‍	10	–	20	.333	29	–	26	.527
x – Division champion † – Conference champion ‡ – Tournament champion y – Invited to the NCAA tournament As of June 30, 2004; Rankings from Collegiate Baseball

The 2004 Southeastern Conference baseball tournament was held at Hoover Metropolitan Stadium in Hoover, AL from May 26 through 30. South Carolina won the tournament and earned the Southeastern Conference's automatic bid to the 2004 NCAA tournament.

== Regular season Results ==
Eastern Division
Team	W	L	Pct	GB	Seed
Georgia	19	11	.633	--	2
South Carolina	17	13	.567	2	5
Florida	17	13	.567	2	6
Vanderbilt	16	14	.533	3	7
Tennessee	14	16	.467	5	8
Kentucky	7	23	.233	12	--

Western Division
Team	W	L	Pct	GB	Seed
Arkansas	19	11	.633	--	1
LSU	18	12	.600	1	3
Ole Miss	18	12	.600	1	4
Mississippi State	13	17	.433	6	--
Auburn	12	18	.400	7	--
Alabama	10	20	.333	9	--

== Tournament ==
First round
6	Florida	5*
3	LSU	4*
7	Vanderbilt	6
2	Georgia	0
3	LSU	0
2	Georgia	1
5	South Carolina	7*
4	Ole Miss	6*
8	Tennessee	8*
1	Arkansas	6*
4	Ole Miss	3
1	Arkansas	4

Second round
6	Florida	0
7	Vanderbilt	3
2	Georgia	0
6	Florida	7
5	South Carolina	5
8	Tennessee	1
1	Arkansas	4
8	Tennessee	1

Semifinals
7	Vanderbilt	6*	-
6	Florida	5*	-
5	South Carolina	3	-
1	Arkansas	2	-

Finals
7	Vanderbilt	2
5	South Carolina	3

- * indicates extra innings.
- Mississippi State, Auburn, Alabama and Kentucky did not make the tournament.

== All-Tournament Team ==
Position	Player	School
1B	C.J. Smith	Florida
2B	Warner Jones	Vanderbilt
3B	Jonathan Tucker	Florida
SS	Ryan Klosterman	Vanderbilt
C	Jonathan Douillard	Vanderbilt
OF	Jake Dugger	Arkansas
OF	Eli Iorg	Tennessee
OF	Brendan Winn	South Carolina
OF	Walter Cochrane	South Carolina
DH	Cesar Nicholas	Vanderbilt
P	Jeremy Sowers	Vanderbilt
P	Connor Falkenbach	Florida
Co-MVP	Steven Tolleson	South Carolina
Co-MVP	Kevin Melillo	South Carolina

== See also ==
- College World Series
- NCAA Division I Baseball Championship
- Southeastern Conference baseball tournament
