= Ray Tanner =

American college athletics administrator and former baseball coach

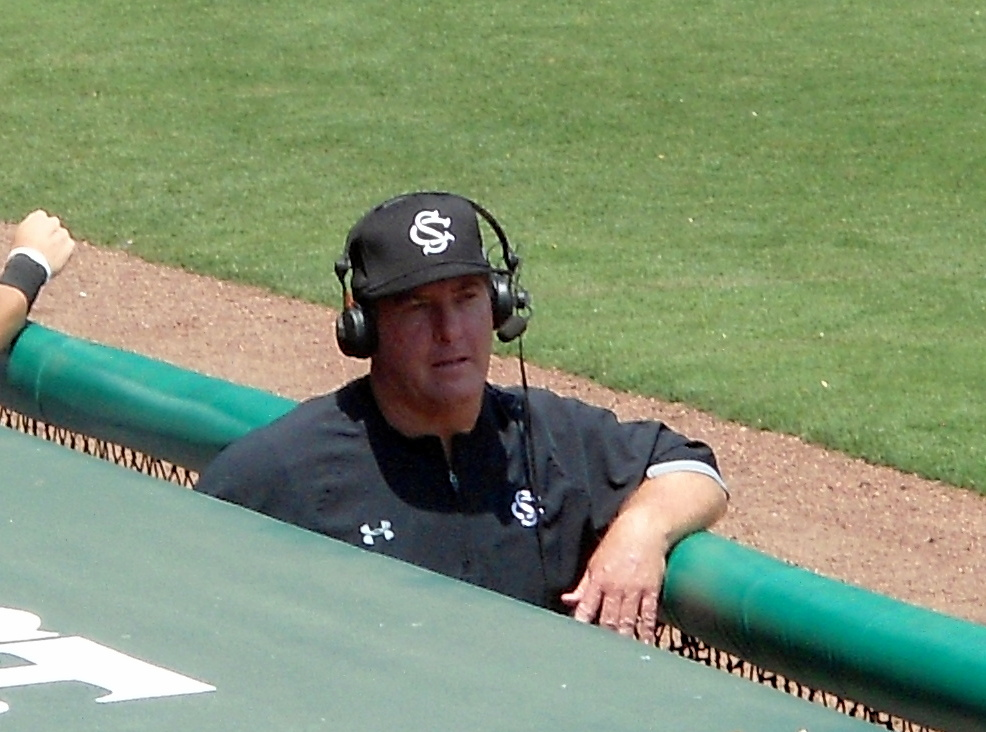
- Tanner in 2012

Current position
- Title: Athletic director emeritus
- Team: South Carolina
- Conference: SEC

Biographical details
- Born: March 25, 1958 (age 68); Smithfield, North Carolina, U.S.

Playing career
- 1977–1980: NC State
- Position: Shortstop

Coaching career (HC unless noted)
- 1980–1987: NC State (assistant)
- 1988–1996: NC State
- 1997–2012: South Carolina

Administrative career (AD unless noted)
- 2012–2024: South Carolina

Head coaching record
- Overall: 1,133–489–3 (.698)

Accomplishments and honors

Championships
- 2x National Championships (2010, 2011); 3x SEC Regular season Championships (2000, 2002, 2011); SEC Tournament championship (2004); 6x SEC East Division Championships (1999, 2000, 2002, 2003, 2011, 2012); ACC Tournament championship (1992)

Awards
- 3x National Coach of the Year (2000, 2010, 2011); 1990 ACC Coach of the Year; 3x SEC Coach of the Year (1998, 2000, 2011)

Donald Ray Tanner Jr. (born March 25, 1958) is a former baseball coach at the University of South Carolina. Tanner began this role after leading the South Carolina Gamecocks baseball program for sixteen seasons. He is currently the athletic director emeritus and a senior advisor to the president at South Carolina after being replaced as athletic director by Jeremiah Donati on December 5, 2024.

His record at South Carolina was 738–316 (.700). He led USC to three consecutive College World Series appearances in 2002, 2003, and 2004; three consecutive College World Series Finals appearances in 2010, 2011, and 2012; two College World Series Championships in 2010 and 2011; and coached the USA Baseball National Team during the 2003 summer. On April 11, 2010, Tanner recorded the 1,000th win of his career with a 2–0 victory over Vanderbilt, becoming the 44th Division I coach to reach the milestone.

== Playing career ==
After graduating from South Johnston High School near his home in Benson, North Carolina, Tanner attended and played baseball at North Carolina State University in Raleigh, from 1977 to 1980. He played for Sam Esposito, starting four seasons at shortstop and third base.

== Coaching career ==
=== NC State ===
Tanner became an assistant coach to NCSU coach Sam Esposito immediately after his playing days were over. He remained in that position from 1980 to 1987, when Esposito retired and Tanner was named his successor. At age 28, he was one of the youngest head coaches in the country. During his first season the Wolfpack reached the NCAA tournament, playing in the East Regional. His teams earned bids to the NCAA tournament during seven of his nine seasons as head coach at NCSU, including five straight from 1990 to 1994. He was named ACC Coach of the Year in 1990.

His nine-year record at NC State was 395–173–3.

=== South Carolina ===
Tanner arrived at South Carolina prior to the start of the 1997 season. Tanner guided the Gamecocks to a 33–24 record in his first season in 1997 and finished fourth in the competitive SEC. The Gamecocks were greatly improved in 1998 and finished with 44 wins and a berth in the NCAA tournament. In 1999, Tanner led the Gamecocks to the SEC East Division title for the school's first division crown. Starting in 2000, Tanner help guide South Carolina to one of the most successful stretches in program history. The Gamecocks made the College World Series in 2002, 2003, and 2004. The 2002 team finished runner-up after losing to the Texas Longhorns in the championship game. The South Carolina baseball team has made the NCAA tournament every year since 2000, and they currently have the longest streak of NCAA tournament appearances in the Southeastern Conference. The 2010 South Carolina Gamecocks baseball team won the College World Series championship after taking the series 2-0 over the UCLA Bruins. The championship was the first men's NCAA championship in school history. The 2011 South Carolina Gamecocks baseball team completed the season 55-14 and won the program's second national title after sweeping the championship series against the Florida Gators 2-0. This marked the first time that a team repeated as national champion since 2006-2007. On the way to the second championship, the Gamecocks went 10-0 in the NCAA tournament and set new records by winning 16 straight NCAA tournament games and 11 straight College World Series games. Both streaks were started in the 2010 season.

In his 16 seasons, through 2012, Tanner has posted a 738–316 overall record with six College World Series appearances. Under Tanner, the Gamecocks have made 14 NCAA tournament appearances, advanced to the Super Regionals ten times, and have posted fourteen 40-win and five 50-win seasons. Tanner led the Gamecocks to the 2010 and 2011 NCAA College World Series Championship. In addition, South Carolina won the 2000, 2002 and 2011 SEC regular season championships and the 2004 SEC Tournament championship. The Gamecocks claimed six Southeastern Conference Eastern Division titles (1999, 2000, 2002, 2003, 2011, 2012) with Tanner as head coach. He was named SEC Coach of the Year in 1998, 2000, and 2011. Tanner was also named National Coach of the Year in 2000 after the Gamecocks finished the season with a 56–10 record, in 2010 after the team finished 54–16, and in 2011 after a 55-14 campaign.

On July 13, 2012, Tanner was named director of athletics at South Carolina.

== Team USA ==
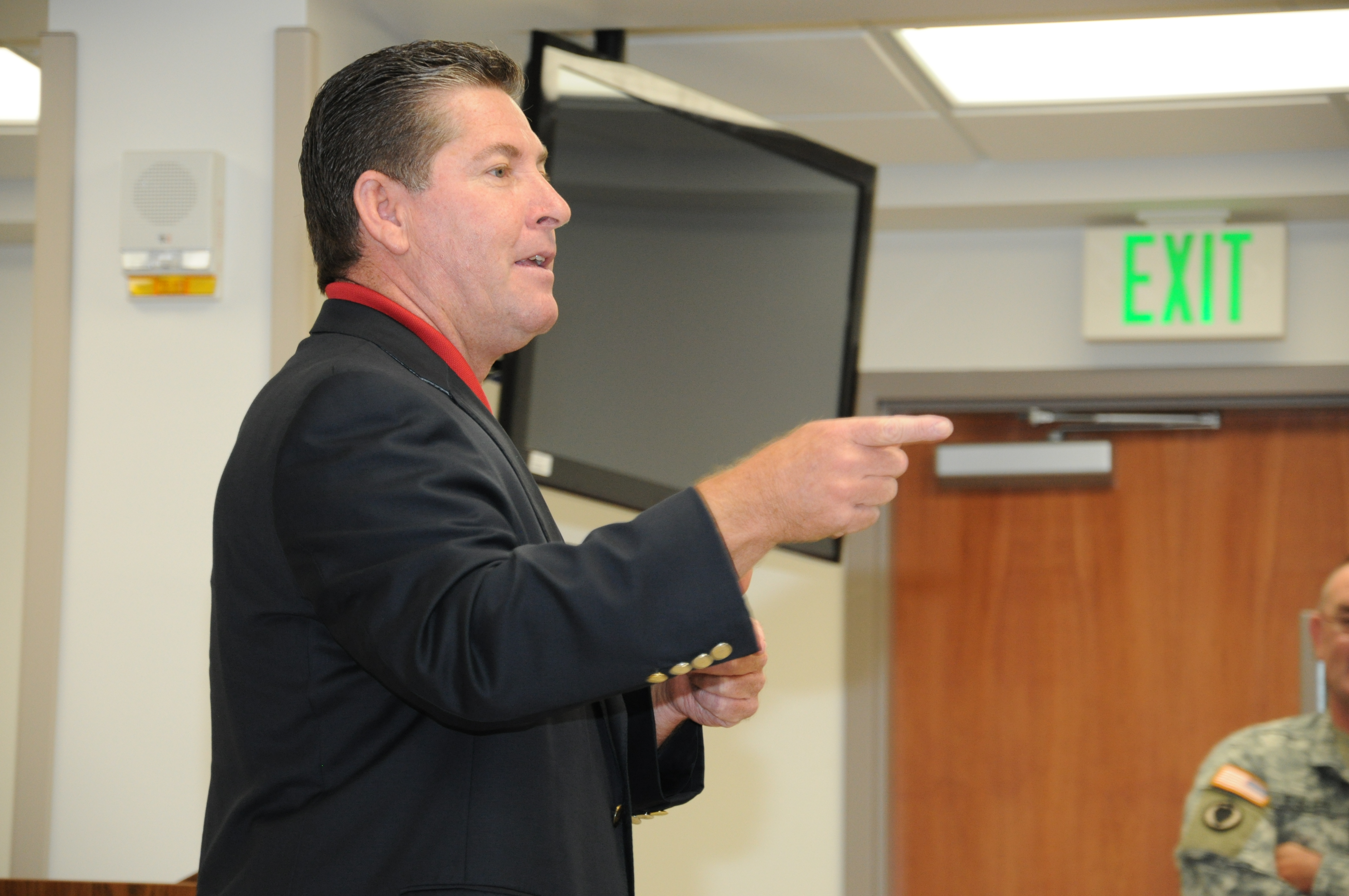
Tanner speaking to soldiers at the Warrior Transition Unit.

Ray Tanner has a longstanding commitment to USA Baseball. He served as an assistant coach in 1993 and again in 1995 and 1996, coaching at the Olympics in Atlanta, Georgia. During these stints he coached together with college baseball legends such as Skip Bertman and Ron Polk. During the summer of 2002, Tanner served as the head coach of the USA Baseball National Team, composed of some of the top college players. The team went undefeated during the regular season, including a sweep of its biggest rival, Japan. The only two losses came at the Pan American Games to Nicaragua and Cuba. The team finished the tournament as the runner-up. The win total of 27 is the highest in team history.

== Personal ==
Tanner grew up in Benson, North Carolina. He received a bachelor of science degree in recreational administration from NC State in 1980 and is married to the former Karen Donald, a native of Charleston, South Carolina. The couple has three children. On November 10, 2010, Tanner was initiated into the Chi Omega chapter of Kappa Sigma fraternity at South Carolina. According to the University of South Carolina's website, "Coach Tanner's involvement with Kappa Sigma comes from the chapter's commitment to the Ray Tanner Foundation, which is dedicated to bettering the lives of economically and medically disadvantaged children."

== Head coaching record ==
Record table
Season	Team	Overall	Conference	Standing	Postseason
NC State Wolfpack (Atlantic Coast Conference) (1988–1996)
1988	NC State	45–16	13–6	2nd	NCAA Regional
1989	NC State	35–21–2	10–10	4th	
1990	NC State	48–20	14–7	3rd	NCAA Regional
1991	NC State	48–20	11–10	3rd	NCAA Regional
1992	NC State	46–18	15–9	3rd	NCAA Regional
1993	NC State	49–17	15–7	2nd	NCAA Regional
1994	NC State	46–18–1	13–11	5th	NCAA Regional
1995	NC State	36–24	14–14	6th	
1996	NC State	42–19	14–13	T–3rd	NCAA Regional
NC State:		395–173–3	119–87		
South Carolina Gamecocks (Southeastern Conference) (1997–2012)
1997	South Carolina	33–24	13–17	4th (East)	
1998	South Carolina	44–18	19–10	2nd (East)	NCAA Regional
1999	South Carolina	35–23	15–15	1st (East)	
2000	South Carolina	56–10	25–5	1st (East)	NCAA Super Regional
2001	South Carolina	49–20	17–13	3rd (East)	NCAA Super Regional
2002	South Carolina	57–18	21–8	1st (East)	College World Series Runner-up
2003	South Carolina	45–22	19–11	1st (East)	College World Series
2004	South Carolina	53–17	17–13	T–2nd (East)	College World Series
2005	South Carolina	41–23	16–14	3rd (East)	NCAA Regional
2006	South Carolina	41–25	15–15	4th (East)	NCAA Super Regional
2007	South Carolina	46–20	17–13	2nd (East)	NCAA Super Regional
2008	South Carolina	40–23	15–15	5th (East)	NCAA Regional
2009	South Carolina	40–23	17–13	2nd (East)	NCAA Regional
2010	South Carolina	54–16	21–9	2nd (East)	College World Series champions
2011	South Carolina	55–14	22–8	T–1st (East)	College World Series champions
2012	South Carolina	49–20	18–11	1st (East)	College World Series Runner-up
South Carolina:		738–316 (.700)	287–190 (.602)		
Total:		1133–489–3 (.698)			
National champion Postseason invitational champion Conference regular season champion Conference regular season and conference tournament champion Division regular season champion Division regular season and conference tournament champion Conference tournament champion

== Achievements ==
- Career record of 1133–489–3 (.699)
- National Coach of the Year in 2000, 2010, and 2011
- 21 NCAA tournament appearances
  - 10 Super Regional appearances, including 5 consecutive from 2000 to 2004
  - 6 College World Series appearances, including three consecutive from 2002 to 2004 and 2010 to 2012
  - 2002, 2012 national runner-up
  - 2010, 2011 national championship
- 2000, 2002 & 2011 SEC Championships
- 1999, 2000, 2002, 2003, 2011 & 2012 SEC East Championships
- 1992 ACC Tournament Title
- 2004 SEC Tournament Title
- Five 50-win seasons
- Second-highest winning percentage among college baseball coaches in SEC history
- Eight first-round draft picks at South Carolina

== See also ==
- List of college baseball career coaching wins leaders
