= 2004 Arkansas Razorbacks baseball team =

American college baseball season

2004 Arkansas Razorbacks baseball

NCAA Fayetteville Super Regional champion NCAA Fayetteville Regional champion SEC regular season champion SEC Western Division champion

College World Series, 7th (tie)
- Conference: Southeastern Conference
- Western Division

Ranking
- Coaches: No. 7
- CB: No. 7
- Record: 45–24 (19–11 SEC)
- Head coach: Dave Van Horn (2nd season)
- Home stadium: Baum Stadium

2004 Southeastern Conference baseball standings
	Conf.				Overall
Team	W		L	PCT	W		L	PCT
Eastern
No. 4 Georgia ^{x}‍†‍‍^{y}	19	–	11	.633	45	–	23	.662
No. 3 South Carolina ‍‍‡‍^{y}	17	–	13	.567	53	–	17	.757
No. 18 Florida ‍‍‍^{y}	17	–	13	.567	43	–	22	.662
No. 17 Vanderbilt ‍‍‍^{y}	16	–	14	.533	45	–	19	.703
Tennessee ‍‍‍^{y}	14	–	16	.467	38	–	24	.613
Kentucky ‍‍‍	7	–	23	.233	24	–	30	.444
Western
No. 7 Arkansas ^{x}‍†‍‍^{y}	19	–	11	.633	45	–	24	.652
No. 8 LSU ‍‍‍^{y}	18	–	12	.600	46	–	19	.708
No. 24 Ole Miss ‍‍‍^{y}	18	–	12	.600	39	–	21	.650
Mississippi State ‍‍‍^{y}	13	–	17	.433	35	–	24	.593
Auburn ‍‍‍	12	–	18	.400	32	–	24	.571
Alabama ‍‍‍	10	–	20	.333	29	–	26	.527
x – Division champion † – Conference champion ‡ – Tournament champion y – Invited to the NCAA tournament As of June 30, 2004; Rankings from Collegiate Baseball

The 2004 Arkansas Razorbacks baseball team represented the University of Arkansas in the 2004 NCAA Division I baseball season. The Razorbacks were coached by Dave Van Horn, in his 2nd season with the Razorbacks, and played their home games at Baum Stadium.

== Schedule and results ==
Legend
	Arkansas win
	Arkansas loss
	Postponement
**Bold**	Arkansas team member

2004 Arkansas Razorbacks baseball game log
Regular season

February (11–3)
Date	Opponent	Rank	Site/stadium	Score	Overall record	SEC record
February 13	Louisiana Tech*		Baum Stadium; Fayetteville, Arkansas	**W** 2–0	1–0	
February 14	Louisiana Tech*		Baum Stadium	**W** 22–2	2–0	
February 15	Louisiana Tech*		Baum Stadium	**W** 13–2	3–0	
February 20	St. John's*		Baum Stadium	**W** 14–7	4–0	
February 21	St. John's*		Baum Stadium	**W** 6–5	5–0	
February 22	St. John's*		Baum Stadium	**W** 14–3	6–0	
February 24	McNeese State*		Baum Stadium	**W** 7–1	7–0	
February 25	McNeese State*		Baum Stadium	**W** 7–2	8–0	
February 27	vs. New Mexico*		Olsen Field; College Station, Texas	**L** 1–3	8–1	
February 27	at No. 23 Texas A&M*		Olsen Field	**L** 5–7	8–2	
February 28	vs. New Mexico*		Olsen Field	**W** 13–3	9–2	
February 28	at No. 23 Texas A&M*		Olsen Field	**W** 6–4	10–2	
February 29	at No. 23 Texas A&M*		Olsen Field	**L** 7–9	10–3	
February 29	vs. New Mexico*		Olsen Field	**W** 5–2	11–3	

March (7–6)
Date	Opponent	Rank	Site/stadium	Score	Overall record	SEC record
March 6	at Texas–Pan American*		Edinburg Stadium; Edinburg, Texas	**L** 1–4	11–4	
March 7	at Texas–Pan American*		Edinburg Stadium	**L** 4–11	11–5	
March 12	UIC*		Baum Stadium	**W** 4–3	12–5	
March 14	UIC*		Baum Stadium	**L** 1–9	12–6	
March 16	Centenary*		Baum Stadium	**W** 10–9	13–6	
March 17	Centenary*		Baum Stadium	**W** 15–3	14–6	
March 19	at No. 15 Florida		Alfred A. McKethan Stadium; Gainesville, Florida	**L** 1–11	14–7	0–1
March 20	at No. 15 Florida		Alfred A. McKethan Stadium	**W** 8–2	15–7	1–1
March 21	at No. 15 Florida		Alfred A. McKethan Stadium	**L** 6–7 (10)	15–8	1–2
March 26	No. 5 South Carolina		Baum Stadium	**W** 5–3	16–8	2–2
March 27	No. 5 South Carolina		Baum Stadium	**W** 5–4	17–8	3–2
March 28	No. 5 South Carolina		Baum Stadium	**L** 2–10	17–9	3–3
March 30	No. 12 Wichita State*		Baum Stadium	**W** 10–4	18–9	

April (12–5)
Date	Opponent	Rank	Site/stadium	Score	Overall record	SEC record
April 2	Alabama		Baum Stadium	**L** 3–6	18–10	3–4
April 3	Alabama		Baum Stadium	**W** 7–2	19–10	4–4
April 4	Alabama		Baum Stadium	**W** 11–6	20–10	5–4
April 6	Southwest Missouri State*		Baum Stadium	**L** 5–6	20–11	
April 9	at No. 3 LSU		Alex Box Stadium; Baton Rouge, Louisiana	**W** 11–8	21–11	6–4
April 10	at No. 3 LSU		Alex Box Stadium	**W** 11–10	22–11	7–4
April 11	at No. 3 LSU		Alex Box Stadium	**W** 7–5	23–11	8–4
April 13	Oral Roberts*	No. 24	Baum Stadium	**L** 4–6	23–12	
April 16	at Vanderbilt	No. 24	Hawkins Field; Nashville, Tennessee	**W** 6–3	24–12	9–4
April 17	at Vanderbilt	No. 24	Hawkins Field	**W** 9–4	25–12	10–4
April 18	at Vanderbilt	No. 24	Hawkins Field	**L** 8–14	25–13	10–5
April 20	Oklahoma State*	No. 24	Baum Stadium	**W** 5–2	26–13	
April 23	Kentucky	No. 24	Baum Stadium	**W** 9–4	27–13	11–5
April 24	Kentucky	No. 24	Baum Stadium	**W** 5–4	28–13	12–5
April 25	Kentucky	No. 24	Baum Stadium	**W** 11–10	29–13	13–5
April 27	at No. 23 Oral Roberts*	No. 22	J. L. Johnson Stadium; Tulsa, Oklahoma	**W** 8–4	30–13	
April 30	No. 17 Tennessee	No. 22	Baum Stadium	**L** 3–9	30–14	13–6

May (7–5)
Date	Opponent	Rank	Site/stadium	Score	Overall record	SEC record
May 1	No. 17 Tennessee	No. 22	Baum Stadium	**W** 4–1	31–14	14–6
May 2	No. 17 Tennessee	No. 22	Baum Stadium	**W** 5–3	32–14	15–6
May 7	at No. 14 Ole Miss	No. 17	Swayze Field; Oxford, Mississippi	**L** 0–1	32–15	15–7
May 8	at No. 14 Ole Miss	No. 17	Hawkins Field	**W** 3–1	33–15	16–7
May 9	at No. 14 Ole Miss	No. 17	Hawkins Field	**L** 3–5	33–16	16–8
May 11	Texas–Pan American*	No. 15	Baum Stadium	**W** 13–2	34–16	
May 15	at Mississippi State	No. 15	Dudy Noble Field, Polk–DeMent Stadium; Starkville, Mississippi	**L** 2–3	34–17	16–9
May 16	at Mississippi State	No. 15	Dudy Noble Field, Polk–DeMent Stadium	**L** 4–5	34–18	16–10
May 16	at Mississippi State	No. 15	Dudy Noble Field, Polk–DeMent Stadium	**W** 4–2	35–18	17–10
May 21	Auburn	No. 19	Baum Stadium	**W** 9–7	36–18	18–10
May 22	Auburn	No. 19	Baum Stadium	**L** 4–7	36–19	18–11
May 23	Auburn	No. 19	Baum Stadium	**W** 15–3	37–19	19–11

Postseason

SEC Tournament (2–2)
Date	Opponent	Rank (Seed)	Site/stadium	Score	Overall record	SECT Record
May 26	vs. (8) Tennessee	No. 14 (1)	Hoover Metropolitan Stadium; Hoover, Alabama	**L** 6–8	37–20	0–1
May 27	vs. No. 12 (4) Ole Miss	No. 14 (1)	Hoover Metropolitan Stadium	**W** 4–3	38–20	1–1
May 28	vs. (8) Tennessee	No. 14 (1)	Hoover Metropolitan Stadium	**W** 4–1	39–20	2–1
May 29	vs. No. 7 (5) South Carolina	No. 14 (1)	Hoover Metropolitan Stadium	**L** 2–3	39–21	2–2

Fayetteville Regional (4–1)
Date	Opponent	Rank (Seed)	Site/stadium	Score	Overall record	NCAAT record
June 4	(4) Le Moyne*	No. 11 (1)	Baum Stadium	**W** 4–1	40–21	1–0
June 5	No. 15 (2) Wichita State*	No. 11 (1)	Baum Stadium	**L** 1–4	40–22	1–1
June 5	(3) Missouri*	No. 11 (1)	Baum Stadium	**W** 10–7	41–22	2–1
June 6	No. 15 (2) Wichita State*	No. 11 (1)	Baum Stadium	**W** 11–9	42–22	3–1
June 6	No. 15 (2) Wichita State*	No. 11 (1)	Baum Stadium	**W** 4–3	43–22	4–1

Fayetteville Super Regional (2–0)
Date	Opponent	Rank (Seed)	Site/stadium	Score	Overall record	NCAAT record
June 11	No. 17 Florida State*	No. 11 (1)	Baum Stadium	**W** 7–5	44–22	5–1
June 12	No. 17 Florida State*	No. 11 (1)	Baum Stadium	**W** 4–2	45–22	6–1

College World Series (0–2)
Date	Opponent	Rank (Seed)	Site/stadium	Score	Overall record	CWS record
June 18	vs. No. 2 (1) Texas*	No. 11 (8)	Johnny Rosenblatt Stadium; Omaha, Nebraska	**L** 2–13	45–23	6–2
June 19	vs. Arizona*	No. 11 (8)	Johnny Rosenblatt Stadium	**L** 2–7	45–24	6–3

*Denotes non–conference game • Schedule source • Rankings based on the teams' current ranking in the USA Today/ESPN Coaches' Poll

== Razorbacks in the 2004 MLB draft ==
The following members of the Arkansas Razorbacks baseball program were drafted in the 2004 Major League Baseball draft.

Player	Position	Round	Overall	MLB Team
Jay Sawatski	P	8th	241st	Minnesota Twins
Brady Toops	C	10th	300th	St. Louis Cardinals
Haas Pratt	1B	30th	907th	Oakland Athletics
Clint Brannon	P	34th	1011th	Texas Rangers
