= 2004 Miami Hurricanes baseball team =

American college baseball season

2004 Miami Hurricanes baseball

NCAA Coral Gables Super Regional champions NCAA Coral Gables Regional champions

College World Series, 1–2
- Conference: Independent

Ranking
- Coaches: No. 4
- CB: No. 5
- Record: 50–13
- Head coach: Jim Morris (11th year)
- Home stadium: Mark Light Field

2004 NCAA Division I baseball independents standings
	Conf.				Overall
Team	W		L	PCT	W		L	PCT
No. 5 Miami (FL) ‍‍‍^{y}		–		–	50	–	13	.794
Dallas Baptist ‍‍‍		–		–	44	–	16	.733
Northern Colorado ‍‍‍		–		–	29	–	23	.558
Utah Valley ‍‍‍		–		–	19	–	17	.528
Savannah State ‍‍‍		–		–	24	–	22	.522
Sacramento State ‍‍‍		–		–	29	–	32	.475
Texas A&M–Corpus Christi ‍‍‍		–		–	23	–	28	.451
Texas–Pan American ‍‍‍		–		–	22	–	31	.415
IPFW ‍‍‍		–		–	20	–	31	.392
NYIT ‍‍‍		–		–	20	–	32	.385
Pace ‍‍‍		–		–	19	–	31	.380
Hawaii–Hilo ‍‍‍		–		–	9	–	43	.173
y – Invited to the NCAA tournament As of June 30, 2004; Rankings from Collegiate Baseball

The 2004 Miami Hurricanes baseball team represented the University of Miami in the 2004 NCAA Division I baseball season. The Hurricanes played their home games at Mark Light Field. The team was coached by Jim Morris in his eleventh season at Miami.

The Hurricanes reached the College World Series, where they finished tied for fifth after recording an opening round win against LSU and losses to eventual champion Cal State Fullerton and South Carolina.

== Personnel ==
=== Roster ===
2004 Miami Hurricanes roster
Pitchers: - Marcelo Albir - Sophomore; - Jon Allen - Sophomore; - Alex Blanco - Junior; - Vince Bongiovanni - Junior; - Brandon Camardese - Junior; - Chiqui Chirino - Sophomore; - J.D. Cockroft - Senior; - Danny Gil - Freshman; - George Huguet - Senior; - Andrew Lane - Sophomore; - Ricky Orta - Freshman; - Chris Perez - Freshman; - Dan Touchet - Senior	Catchers: - Cesar Carillo - Freshman; - Robert Helmer - Freshman; - Eddy Rodriguez - Freshman; - Erick San Pedro - Junior; Infielders: - Ryan Braun - Sophomore; - Joey Hooft - Junior; - Adam Ricks - Senior; - Gaby Sánchez - Sophomore; - Roger Tomas - Freshman	Outfielders: - Brian Barton - Senior; - Jim Burt - Senior; - Danny Figueroa - Junior; - Paco Figueroa - Junior; - Richard Giannotti - Junior; - Jon Jay - Freshman; - Brendan Katin - Junior; Unknown: - Andrew Cohn - Senior; - Shawn Valdes-Fauli - Junior

=== Coaches ===
2004 Miami Hurricanes baseball coaching staff
- Jim Morris – Head coach – 11th year

== Schedule and results ==
Legend
Miami win
Miami loss

2004 Miami Hurricanes baseball game log
Regular season (44–11)

February (7–3)
Date	Opponent	Rank	Site/stadium	Score	Overall record
Feb 13	No. 15 Florida	No. 1	Mark Light Field • Coral Gables, FL	L 0–3	0–1
Feb 14	No. 15 Florida	No. 1	Mark Light Field • Coral Gables, FL	W 4–1	1–1
Feb 15	No. 15 Florida	No. 1	Mark Light Field • Coral Gables, FL	W 19–5	2–1
Feb 20	Tennessee	No. 3	Mark Light Field • Coral Gables, FL	W 8–7	3–1
Feb 21	Tennessee	No. 3	Mark Light Field • Coral Gables, FL	L 11–14	3–2
Feb 22	Tennessee	No. 3	Mark Light Field • Coral Gables, FL	W 14–3	4–2
Feb 26	at FIU	No. 8	University Park Stadium • Miami, FL	L 7–11	4–3
Feb 27	vs FIU	No. 8	Homestead Sports Complex • Homestead, FL	W 9–7	5–3
Feb 28	vs La Salle	No. 8	Homestead Sports Complex • Homestead, FL	W 17–0	6–3
Feb 29	No. 25 Minnesota	No. 8	Mark Light Field • Coral Gables, FL	W 9–2	7–3

March (15–2)
Date	Opponent	Rank	Site/stadium	Score	Overall record
Mar 4	Maine	No. 8	Mark Light Field • Coral Gables, FL	W 9–3	8–3
Mar 5	Elon	No. 8	Mark Light Field • Coral Gables, FL	W 6–3	9–3
Mar 6	Elon	No. 8	Mark Light Field • Coral Gables, FL	W 24–0	10–3
Mar 7	Elon	No. 8	Mark Light Field • Coral Gables, FL	W 6–5	11–3
Mar 10	Campbell	No. 7	Mark Light Field • Coral Gables, FL	W 10–8	12–3
Mar 12	Rutgers	No. 7	Mark Light Field • Coral Gables, FL	W 12–2	13–3
Mar 13	Rutgers	No. 7	Mark Light Field • Coral Gables, FL	W 10–5	14–3
Mar 14	Rutgers	No. 7	Mark Light Field • Coral Gables, FL	W 6–5	15–3
Mar 16	at South Florida	No. 6	Red McEwen Field • Tampa, FL	L 2–7	15–4
Mar 17	at South Florida	No. 6	Red McEwen Field • Tampa, FL	W 17–3	16–4
Mar 19	UIC	No. 6	Mark Light Field • Coral Gables, FL	W 6–3	17–4
Mar 20	UIC	No. 6	Mark Light Field • Coral Gables, FL	W 6–4	18–4
Mar 21	UIC	No. 6	Mark Light Field • Coral Gables, FL	W 13–1	19–4
Mar 24	FIU	No. 8	Mark Light Field • Coral Gables, FL	L 4–5	19–5
Mar 27	Penn State	No. 8	Mark Light Field • Coral Gables, FL	W 6–1	20–5
Mar 27	Penn State	No. 8	Mark Light Field • Coral Gables, FL	W 1–0	21–5
Mar 28	Penn State	No. 8	Mark Light Field • Coral Gables, FL	W 11–3	22–5

April (9–4)
Date	Opponent	Rank	Site/stadium	Score	Overall record
Apr 2	at Georgia Tech	No. 6	Russ Chandler Stadium • Atlanta, GA	L 4–17	22–6
Apr 3	at Georgia Tech	No. 6	Russ Chandler Stadium • Atlanta, GA	W 9–7	23–6
Apr 4	at Georgia Tech	No. 6	Russ Chandler Stadium • Atlanta, GA	W 16–13	24–6
Apr 9	at No. 13 Florida State	No. 7	Dick Howser Stadium • Tallahassee, FL	L 5–6	24–7
Apr 10	at No. 13 Florida State	No. 7	Dick Howser Stadium • Tallahassee, FL	W 17–11	25–7
Apr 11	at No. 13 Florida State	No. 7	Dick Howser Stadium • Tallahassee, FL	W 4–0	26–7
Apr 16	No. 14 Florida State	No. 5	Mark Light Field • Coral Gables, FL	W 10–0	27–7
Apr 17	No. 14 Florida State	No. 5	Mark Light Field • Coral Gables, FL	W 7–3	28–7
Apr 18	No. 14 Florida State	No. 5	Mark Light Field • Coral Gables, FL	L 3–10	28–8
Apr 23	No. 15 Virginia	No. 5	Mark Light Field • Coral Gables, FL	W 8–0	29–8
Apr 24	No. 15 Virginia	No. 5	Mark Light Field • Coral Gables, FL	W 22–3	30–8
Apr 25	No. 15 Virginia	No. 5	Mark Light Field • Coral Gables, FL	L 3–4	30–9
Apr 30	Coastal Carolina	No. 4	Mark Light Field • Coral Gables, FL	W 6–1	31–9

May (13–2)
Date	Opponent	Rank	Site/stadium	Score	Overall record
May 1	Coastal Carolina	No. 4	Mark Light Field • Coral Gables, FL	W 5–1	32–9
May 2	Coastal Carolina	No. 4	Mark Light Field • Coral Gables, FL	W 13–11	33–9
May 7	Jacksonville	No. 4	Mark Light Field • Coral Gables, FL	W 6–4	34–9
May 8	Jacksonville	No. 4	Mark Light Field • Coral Gables, FL	W 12–4	35–9
May 9	Jacksonville	No. 4	Mark Light Field • Coral Gables, FL	W 7–4	36–9
May 14	No. 16 North Carolina	No. 3	Mark Light Field • Coral Gables, FL	L 1–4	36–10
May 15	No. 16 North Carolina	No. 3	Mark Light Field • Coral Gables, FL	W 4–3	37–10
May 16	No. 16 North Carolina	No. 3	Mark Light Field • Coral Gables, FL	L 0–2	37–11
May 19	Florida Atlantic	No. 5	Mark Light Field • Coral Gables, FL	W 13–3	38–11
May 20	Ball State	No. 5	Mark Light Field • Coral Gables, FL	W 9–1	39–11
May 21	Ball State	No. 5	Mark Light Field • Coral Gables, FL	W 4–2	40–11
May 22	Ball State	No. 5	Mark Light Field • Coral Gables, FL	W 7–3	41–11
May 27	No. 17 Long Beach State	No. 3	Mark Light Field • Coral Gables, FL	W 8–5	42–11
May 28	No. 17 Long Beach State	No. 3	Mark Light Field • Coral Gables, FL	W 7–3	43–11
May 29	No. 17 Long Beach State	No. 3	Mark Light Field • Coral Gables, FL	W 7–6	44–11

Postseason (6–2)

NCAA Coral Gables Regional (3–0)
Date	Opponent	Seed	Site/stadium	Score	Overall record	NCAAT record
June 4	(4) St. Bonaventure	No. 1 (1)	Mark Light Field • Coral Gables, FL	W 6–3	45–11	1–0
June 5	(2) NC State	No. 1 (1)	Mark Light Field • Coral Gables, FL	W 1–0	46–11	2–0
June 6	(3) Florida Atlantic	No. 1 (1)	Mark Light Field • Coral Gables, FL	W 19–6	47–11	3–0

NCAA Coral Gables Super Regional (2–0)
Date	Opponent	Seed	Site/stadium	Score	Overall record	SR Record
June 12	No. 17 Florida	No. 1 (3)	Mark Light Field • Coral Gables, FL	W 8–7	48–11	1–0
June 13	No. 17 Florida	No. 1 (3)	Mark Light Field • Coral Gables, FL	W 3–1	49–11	2–0

College World Series (1–2)
Date	Opponent	Seed	Site/stadium	Score	Overall record	CWS record
June 19	No. 6 LSU	No. 1 (3)	Johnny Rosenblatt Stadium • Omaha, NE	W 9–5	50–11	1–0
June 21	No. 4 Cal State Fullerton	No. 1 (3)	Johnny Rosenblatt Stadium • Omaha, NE	L 3–6	50–12	1–1
June 22	No. 7 (2) South Carolina	No. 1 (3)	Johnny Rosenblatt Stadium • Omaha, NE	L 11–15	50–13	1–2
