= 2004 Florida Gators baseball team =

American college baseball season

2004 Florida Gators baseball

Oklahoma City Regional champions

Coral Gables Super Regional, 0–2
- Conference: Southeastern Conference

Ranking
- Coaches: No. 16
- CB: No. 18
- Record: 43–22 (17–13 SEC)
- Head coach: Pat McMahon (3rd year)
- Assistant coach: Ross Jones (3rd year); Tim Parenton (1st year)
- Home stadium: Alfred A. McKethan Stadium

2004 Southeastern Conference baseball standings
	Conf.				Overall
Team	W		L	PCT	W		L	PCT
Eastern
No. 4 Georgia ^{x}‍†‍‍^{y}	19	–	11	.633	45	–	23	.662
No. 3 South Carolina ‍‍‡‍^{y}	17	–	13	.567	53	–	17	.757
No. 18 Florida ‍‍‍^{y}	17	–	13	.567	43	–	22	.662
No. 17 Vanderbilt ‍‍‍^{y}	16	–	14	.533	45	–	19	.703
Tennessee ‍‍‍^{y}	14	–	16	.467	38	–	24	.613
Kentucky ‍‍‍	7	–	23	.233	24	–	30	.444
Western
No. 7 Arkansas ^{x}‍†‍‍^{y}	19	–	11	.633	45	–	24	.652
No. 8 LSU ‍‍‍^{y}	18	–	12	.600	46	–	19	.708
No. 24 Ole Miss ‍‍‍^{y}	18	–	12	.600	39	–	21	.650
Mississippi State ‍‍‍^{y}	13	–	17	.433	35	–	24	.593
Auburn ‍‍‍	12	–	18	.400	32	–	24	.571
Alabama ‍‍‍	10	–	20	.333	29	–	26	.527
x – Division champion † – Conference champion ‡ – Tournament champion y – Invited to the NCAA tournament As of June 30, 2004; Rankings from Collegiate Baseball

The 2004 Florida Gators baseball team represented the University of Florida in the sport of baseball during the 2004 college baseball season. The Gators competed in Division I of the National Collegiate Athletic Association (NCAA) and the Eastern Division of the Southeastern Conference (SEC). They played their home games at Alfred A. McKethan Stadium, on the university's Gainesville, Florida campus. The team was coached by Pat McMahon, who was in his third season at Florida.

== Roster ==
2004 Florida Gators baseball team
Players
Coaches

#	Pos.	Name	B/T	Height	Weight	Year	Home town
44	RHP	Bryan Ball	R/R	6 ft 1 in (1.85 m)	210 lb (95 kg)	So	Punta Gorda, FL
47	RHP	David Bartelt	R/R	6 ft 0 in (1.83 m)	205 lb (93 kg)	So	Odessa, FL
6	OF	Stephen Barton	L/R	5 ft 9 in (1.75 m)	185 lb (84 kg)	So	Miami, FL
30	C	Carson Bassett	R/R	5 ft 8 in (1.73 m)	175 lb (79 kg)	So	Babson Park, FL
32	LHP	Matt Bomeisl	L/L	5 ft 10 in (1.78 m)	170 lb (77 kg)	Jr	Miami, FL
48	RHP	Tommy Boss	R/R	6 ft 2 in (1.88 m)	215 lb (98 kg)	Jr	Dunnellon, FL
10	OF	Daniel Brooks	R/R	5 ft 11 in (1.8 m)	210 lb (95 kg)	So	Tampa, FL
7	OF	Jeff Corsaletti	L/R	5 ft 11 in (1.8 m)	190 lb (86 kg)	Jr	Port Charlotte, FL
28	C	Matt Cresap	R/R	5 ft 9 in (1.75 m)	170 lb (77 kg)	Sr	Tallahassee, FL
9	INF	Adam Davis	S/R	5 ft 9 in (1.75 m)	180 lb (82 kg)	Fr	Fort Myers, FL
20	OF	Gavin Dickey	R/R	5 ft 10 in (1.78 m)	195 lb (88 kg)	Fr	Tallahassee, FL
39	C	Bo Dring	R/R	5 ft 8 in (1.73 m)	170 lb (77 kg)	Sr	Myakka City, FL
25	INF	Austin Easley	R/R	6 ft 1 in (1.85 m)	215 lb (98 kg)	Jr	Coweta, OK
16	RHP	Matt Eckardt	R/R	6 ft 3 in (1.91 m)	220 lb (100 kg)	Fr	Alpharetta, GA
23	RHP	Connor Falkenbach	R/R	5 ft 11 in (1.8 m)	175 lb (79 kg)	Jr	Parkland, FL
34	RHP	Matt Fuchs	R/R	6 ft 2 in (1.88 m)	205 lb (93 kg)	Fr	Lakeland, FL
43	OF	Ben Harrison	R/R	6 ft 3 in (1.91 m)	220 lb (100 kg)	Sr	Key West, FL
45	RHP	Ben Hedgecock (injured)	R/R	6 ft 4 in (1.93 m)	215 lb (98 kg)	Sr	Tampa, FL
11	INF	John Michael Howell	L/R	6 ft 2 in (1.88 m)	200 lb (91 kg)	Jr	Winter Park, FL
21	RHP	Justin Hoyman	R/R	6 ft 3 in (1.91 m)	200 lb (91 kg)	Jr	Cocoa, FL
8	C	Brian Jeroloman	L/R	5 ft 11 in (1.8 m)	180 lb (82 kg)	Fr	Wellington, FL
4	INF	Ryan Kennedy	S/R	5 ft 7 in (1.7 m)	165 lb (75 kg)	Fr	Bradenton, FL
54	RHP	Jimmy Kubek	R/R	6 ft 2 in (1.88 m)	210 lb (95 kg)	Fr	Seminole, FL
13	C	Matt LaPorta	R/R	6 ft 0 in (1.83 m)	210 lb (95 kg)	Fr	Port Charlotte, FL
2	OF	Brian Leclerc	L/L	5 ft 9 in (1.75 m)	165 lb (75 kg)	Fr	Clearwater, FL
31	RHP	Christian Madson	R/R	6 ft 6 in (1.98 m)	220 lb (100 kg)	So	Valrico, FL
5	INF	Matt Maley	L/R	6 ft 1 in (1.85 m)	190 lb (86 kg)	Sr	Miami, FL
3	INF	Brandon McArthur	R/R	6 ft 0 in (1.83 m)	170 lb (77 kg)	Fr	Seffner, FL
17	RHP	Kyle Muschara	R/R	6 ft 2 in (1.88 m)	180 lb (82 kg)	Fr	Marietta, GA
35	RHP	Darren O'Day	R/R	6 ft 3 in (1.91 m)	220 lb (100 kg)	So	Jacksonville, FL
27	LHP	Mike Pete	L/L	5 ft 10 in (1.78 m)	180 lb (82 kg)	Jr	Brandon, FL
15	LHP	Steven Porter	L/L	6 ft 3 in (1.91 m)	200 lb (91 kg)	Fr	Ocoee, FL
46	C	Greg Quatrino	R/R	5 ft 11 in (1.8 m)	200 lb (91 kg)	Fr	Tampa, FL
24	LHP	Lee Roberson	L/L	5 ft 11 in (1.8 m)	190 lb (86 kg)	Sr	Fayetteville, GA
42	LHP	Adam Sanabria	L/L	5 ft 11 in (1.8 m)	200 lb (91 kg)	Jr	Longwood, FL
22	INF	Jon Skorupski	R/R	5 ft 10 in (1.78 m)	205 lb (93 kg)	Jr	Seminole, FL
12	INF	C.J. Smith	R/R	6 ft 4 in (1.93 m)	220 lb (100 kg)	Jr	Tampa, FL
41	INF	Seth Steinhauer	L/R	6 ft 3 in (1.91 m)	220 lb (100 kg)	Fr	Stuard, FL
14	RHP	Justin Stiver	R/R	6 ft 1 in (1.85 m)	180 lb (82 kg)	So	Englewood, FL
29	INF	Justin Tordi	R/R	6 ft 1 in (1.85 m)	195 lb (88 kg)	So	Orlando, FL
1	INF	Jonathan Tucker	R/R	5 ft 7 in (1.7 m)	170 lb (77 kg)	Jr	El Sobrante, CA

Head coach

Pat McMahon

Assistant coach(es)

Ross Jones
Tim Parenton

Legend

- (C) Team captain
- (S) Suspended
- (I) Ineligible
- Injured
- Current redshirt

Roster

== Schedule ==
2004 Florida Gators baseball game log
Regular season
February

Date	Opponent	Rank	Stadium Site	Score	Win	Loss	Save	Attendance	Overall Record	SEC Record
February 7	Gardner–Webb	No. 15	McKethan Stadium	14–0	Hoyman (1–0)	Long (0–1)	None	3,185	1–0	–
February 8	Gardner–Webb	No. 15	McKethan Stadium	8–4	Falkenbach (1–0)	Ward (0–1)	O'Day (1)	1,621	2–0	–
February 13	at No. 1 Miami (FL); Rivalry	No. 15	Mark Light Stadium; Coral Gables, FL	3–0	Hoyman (2–0)	Cockroft (0–1)	O'Day (2)	4,513	3–0	–
February 14	at No. 1 Miami (FL); Rivalry	No. 15	Mark Light Stadium	1–4	Bongiovanni (1–0)	Porter (0–1)	Carrillo (1)	3,774	3–1	–
February 15	at No. 1 Miami (FL); Rivalry	No. 15	Mark Light Stadium	5–19	Gil (1–0)	Fuchs (0–1)	Perez (1)	2,632	3–2	–
February 18	Florida A&M	No. 19	McKethan Stadium	11–5	Ball (1–0)	Patrick (1–3)	None	1,295	4–2	–
February 20	Miami (OH)	No. 19	McKethan Stadium	8–9	Weiser (1–0)	O'Day (0–1)	None	1,723	4–3	–
February 21	Miami (OH)	No. 19	McKethan Stadium	4–3	Falkenbach (2–0)	Day (0–1)	None	2,012	5–3	–
February 22	Miami (OH)	No. 19	McKethan Stadium	9–8	Boss (1–0)	Reineke (0–1)	Roberson (1)	2,052	6–3	–
February 25	Michigan	No. 21	McKethan Stadium	9–4	Ball (2–0)	Taylor (0–1)	Falkenbach (1)	519	7–3	–
February 26	Michigan	No. 21	McKethan Stadium	20–7^{7}	Sanabria (1–0)	Brauer (0–1)	None	634	8–3	–
February 28	Northwestern	No. 21	McKethan Stadium	5–3	Hoyman (3–0)	Mikrut (1–1)	None	2,382	9–3	–
February 29	Northwestern	No. 21	McKethan Stadium	12–3	Falkenbach (3–0)	Brauer (0–1)	None	2,133	10–3	–

March

Date	Opponent	Rank	Stadium Site	Score	Win	Loss	Save	Attendance	Overall Record	SEC Record
March 1	Northwestern	No. 19	McKethan Stadium	6–3	Ball (3–0)	Konecny (0–2)	O'Day (3)	1,437	11–3	–
March 3	at Stetson	No. 19	Melching Field; DeLand, FL	12–8	Falkenbach (4–0)	McCuen (3–1)	O'Day (4)	2,248	12–3	–
March 5	Purdue	No. 19	McKethan Stadium	8–7	Roberson (1–0)	Driscoll (0–1)	None	2,158	13–3	–
March 6	Purdue	No. 19	McKethan Stadium	8–3	Falkenbach (5–0)	Karpel (0–1)	None	2,528	14–3	–
March 7	Purdue	No. 19	McKethan Stadium	3–2	Roberson (2–0)	Toneguzzi (1–1)	O'Day (5)	1,537	15–3	–
March 12	Brown	No. 14	McKethan Stadium	14–8	Hoyman (4–0)	Davidson (0–1)	None	1,567	16–3	–
March 13	Brown	No. 14	McKethan Stadium	6–5^{10}	O'Day (1–1)	Hagerty (0–1)	None	1,622	17–3	–
March 14	Brown	No. 14	McKethan Stadium	14–1	Ball (4–0)	Cramphin (0–1)	None	1,427	18–3	–
March 17	Army	No. 12	McKethan Stadium	5–9	Bumgardner (1–0)	Porter (0–2)	None	2,153	18–4	–
March 19	No. 15 Arkansas	No. 12	McKethan Stadium	11–1	Hoyman (5–0)	Lennerton (0–2)	None	2,660	19–4	1–0
March 20	No. 15 Arkansas	No. 12	McKethan Stadium	2–8	Boyce (3–1)	Falkenbach (5–1)	Hall (2)	2,183	19–5	1–1
March 21	No. 15 Arkansas	No. 12	McKethan Stadium	7–6^{10}	O'Day (2–1)	Sawatski (2–2)	None	1,775	20–5	2–1
March 24	Dartmouth	No. 14	McKethan Stadium	11–6	Porter (1–2)	Grant (1–2)	None	1,621	21–5	–
March 26	at Kentucky	No. 14	Cliff Hagan Stadium; Lexington, KY	8–4	Hoyman (6–0)	Gibson (2–1)	None	1,100	22–5	3–1
March 27	at Kentucky	No. 14	Cliff Hagan Stadium	17–6	Ball (5–0)	Scott (4–1)	Roberson (2)	982	23–5	4–1
March 28	at Kentucky	No. 14	Cliff Hagan Stadium	8–1	Boss (2–0)	Snipp (1–3)	Falkenbach (2)	864	24–5	5–1
March 31	No. 10 Florida State; Rivalry	No. 8	McKethan Stadium	7–6^{11}	O'Day (3–1)	Chambliss (0–1)	None	5,663	25–5	–

April

Date	Opponent	Rank	Stadium Site	Score	Win	Loss	Save	Attendance	Overall Record	SEC Record
April 2	Georgia	No. 8	McKethan Stadium	5–10	Lubrano (3–2)	Roberson (2–1)	Startup (4)	3,276	25–6	5–2
April 3	Georgia	No. 8	McKethan Stadium	5–8	Ruthven (3–0)	Ball (5–1)	Startup (5)	3,328	25–7	5–3
April 4	Georgia	No. 8	McKethan Stadium	5–9	Boggs (1–0)	Boss (2–1)	None	2,545	25–8	5–4
April 9	at No. 9 South Carolina	No. 17	Sarge Frye Field; Columbia, SC	4–5^{10}	Hempy (1–1)	Falkenbach (5–2)	None	4,827	25–9	5–5
April 10	at No. 9 South Carolina	No. 17	Sarge Frye Field	9–8	O'Day (4–1)	Blackwell (2–2)	None	4,552	26–9	6–5
April 11	at No. 9 South Carolina	No. 17	Sarge Frye Field	6–7^{10}	Hempy (2–1)	Falkenbach (5–3)	None	2,951	26–10	6–6
April 16	at Mississippi State	No. 19	Dudy Noble Field; Starkville, MS	2–11	Johnson (2–1)	Boss (2–2)	None	7,693	26–11	6–7
April 17	at Mississippi State	No. 19	Dudy Noble Field	16–6	Hoyman (7–0)	Doolittle (2–1)	None	10,617	27–11	7–7
April 18	at Mississippi State	No. 19	Dudy Noble Field	8–3	Falkenbach (6–3)	Lacher (3–5)	None	7,252	28–11	8–7
April 21	at No. 12 Florida State; Rivalry	No. 21	Dick Howser Stadium; Tallahassee, FL	4–16	Jones (3–2)	Sanabria (1–1)	None	5,525	28–12	–
April 23	Vanderbilt	No. 21	McKethan Stadium	5–3	Falkenbach (7–3)	Sowers (6–3)	None	2,547	29–12	9–7
April 24	Vanderbilt	No. 21	McKethan Stadium	4–2	Hoyman (8–0)	Lewis (4–4)	None	2,362	30–12	10–7
April 25	Vanderbilt	No. 21	McKethan Stadium	3–2^{10}	O'Day (5–1)	Rote (1–3)	None	2,307	31–12	11–7
April 30	No. 19 Auburn	No. 13	McKethan Stadium	7–4	Boss (3–2)	Hughey (6–2)	Falkenbach (3)	1,456	32–12	12–7

May

Date	Opponent	Rank	Stadium Site	Score	Win	Loss	Save	Attendance	Overall Record	SEC Record
May 1	No. 19 Auburn	No. 13	McKethan Stadium	11–8	Hoyman (9–0)	Madden (1–1)	None	2,060	33–12	13–7
May 2	No. 19 Auburn	No. 13	McKethan Stadium	22–8	Pete (1–0)	Bell (2–2)	None	1,737	34–12	14–7
May 7	at Alabama	No. 10	Sewell–Thomas Stadium; Tuscaloosa, AL	0–2	LeBlanc (7–4)	Boss (3–3)	None	4,317	34–13	14–8
May 8	at Alabama	No. 10	Sewell–Thomas Stadium	8–5	Hoyman (10–0)	Johnson (2–3)	None	4,528	35–13	15–8
May 9	at Alabama	No. 10	Sewell–Thomas Stadium	6–5^{8}	O'Day (6–1)	Norris (1–1)	None	4,277	36–13	16–8
May 12	Florida State; Rivalry	No. 6	McKethan Stadium	3–2	O'Day (7–1)	Lynch (3–4)	None	5,469	37–13	–
May 14	No. 18 Ole Miss	No. 6	McKethan Stadium	2–4	Holliman (8–2)	Boss (3–4)	Head (5)	3,047	37–14	16–9
May 15	No. 18 Ole Miss	No. 6	McKethan Stadium	1–3	Cupps (3–2)	Hoyman (10–1)	Thompson (2)	2,560	37–15	16–10
May 16	No. 18 Ole Miss	No. 6	McKethan Stadium	9-10^{10}	Thompson (3–0)	Falkenbach (7–4)	None	2,105	37–16	16–11
May 21	at Tennessee	No. 18	Lindsey Nelson Stadium; Knoxville, TN	4–5	Drucker (7–3)	Falkenbach (7–5)	None	1,257	37–17	16–12
May 22	at Tennessee	No. 18	Lindsey Nelson Stadium	7–9	Hicklen (4–2)	Falkenbach (7–6)	None	1,765	37–18	16–13
May 23	at Tennessee	No. 18	Lindsey Nelson Stadium	5–3	Falkenbach (8–6)	Cobb (3–3)	Ball (1)	1,814	38–18	17–13

Postseason
SEC Tournament

Date	Opponent	Rank	Stadium Site	Score	Win	Loss	Save	Attendance	Overall Record	SECT Record
May 26	vs. No. 11 LSU	No. 25	Metropolitan Stadium; Hoover, AL	5–4^{10}	O'Day (8–1)	Determann (5–4)	None	–	39–18	1–0
May 27	vs. Vanderbilt	No. 25	Metropolitan Stadium	0–3	Mullins (8–2)	Boss (3–5)	Lewis (2)	–	39–19	1–1
May 28	vs. No. 10 Georgia	No. 25	Metropolitan Stadium	7–0	Falkenbach (9–6)	Hyle (7–2)	None	–	40–19	2–1
May 29	vs. Vanderbilt	No. 25	Metropolitan Stadium	5–6^{12}	Lewis (6–4)	Porter (1–3)	None	3,136	40–20	2–2

NCAA tournament: Oklahoma City Regional

Date	Opponent	Rank	Stadium Site	Score	Win	Loss	Save	Attendance	Overall Record	Regional Record
June 4	vs. Central Connecticut		Bricktown Ballpark; Oklahoma City, OK	12–1	Hoyman (11–1)	Pappariella (7–3)	None	2,250	41–20	1–0
June 5	vs. UCLA		Bricktown Ballpark	4–3	Falkenbach (10–6)	Whisler (3–5)	None	1,981	42–20	2–0
June 6	vs. UCLA		Bricktown Ballpark	11–0	Boss (4–5)	Miltenberger (3–2)	None	2,341	43–20	3–0

NCAA tournament: Coral Gables Super Regional

Date	Opponent	Rank	Stadium Site	Score	Win	Loss	Save	Attendance	Overall Record	Super Reg. Record
June 12	at No. 1 Miami (FL); Rivalry	No. 17	Mark Light Stadium	7–8	Orta (2–0)	Hoyman (11–2)	Gil (5)	5,097	43–21	0–1
June 13	at No. 1 Miami (FL); Rivalry	No. 17	Mark Light Stadium	1–3	Carrillo (11–0)	Falkenbach (10–7)	None	4,853	43–22	0–2

Rankings from Collegiate Baseball. All times Eastern. Retrieved from FloridaGators.com

== See also ==
- Florida Gators
- List of Florida Gators baseball players
