= 2004 NCAA Division I baseball rankings =

2004 NCAA Division I baseball season
- Duration: January 16 – June 27, 2004
- Number of teams: 288

Tournament
- Duration: June 4 – 27, 2004
- Most conference bids: SEC (9)

College World Series
- Duration: June 18 – 27, 2004
- Champions: Cal State Fullerton (4th title)
- Runners-up: Texas
- MOP: Jason Windsor

Seasons
- ← 2003 2005 →

The following polls make up the 2004 NCAA Division I baseball rankings. USA Today and ESPN began publishing the Coaches' Poll of 31 active coaches ranking the top 25 teams in the nation in 1992. Each coach is a member of the American Baseball Coaches Association. Baseball America began publishing its poll of the top 20 teams in college baseball in 1981. Beginning with the 1985 season, it expanded to the top 25. Collegiate Baseball Newspaper published its first human poll of the top 20 teams in college baseball in 1957, and expanded to rank the top 30 teams in 1961.

== Legend ==
	Increase in ranking
	Decrease in ranking
	Not ranked previous week
Italics	Number of first place votes
(#-#)	Win–loss record
т	Tied with team above or below also with this symbol

== USA Today/ESPN Coaches' Poll ==
	Preseason Jan 12	Week 1 Feb 09	Week 2 Feb 16	Week 3 Feb 23	Week 4 Mar 01	Week 5 Mar 08	Week 6 Mar 15	Week 7 Mar 22	Week 8 Mar 29	Week 9 Apr 05	Week 10 Apr 12	Week 11 Apr 19	Week 12 Apr 26	Week 13 May 03	Week 14 May 10	Week 15 May 17	Week 16 May 24	Week 17 May 31	Final Jun 28	
1.	Rice (39)	Rice (0-0)	Rice (2-1)	Stanford (10-2)	Stanford (13-2)	Texas (19-2)	Texas (23-2)	Texas (26-3)	Stanford (20-3)	Texas (31-4)	Texas (35-4)	Texas (38-5)	Texas (41-6)	Stanford (35-6)	Texas (46-8)	Stanford (39-9)	Texas (48-11)	Stanford (44-12)	Cal State Fullerton (47-22)	1.
2.	Miami (FL) (1)	Miami (FL) (0-0)	Texas (9-0)	Rice (5-2)	Rice (7-2)	Stanford (15-3)	Stanford (15-3)	Stanford (15-3)	Texas (28-4)	Stanford (23-4)	Stanford (25-5)	Stanford (29-5)	Stanford (31-6)	Texas (42-8)	Miami (FL) (36-9)	Rice (38-9)	Stanford (42-11)	Texas (50-13)	Texas (58-15)	2.
3.	LSU	LSU (0-0)	Stanford (8-1)	Texas (11-2)	Texas (15-2)	Rice (11-3)	Rice (14-4)	LSU (18-3)	LSU (21-4)	LSU (24-5)	Rice (27-6)	Rice (30-7)	Rice (33-7)	Rice (33-7)	Stanford (37-8)	Texas (46-10)	Miami (FL) (41-11)	Miami (FL) (41-11)	South Carolina (53-17)	3.
4.	Stanford	Stanford (5-1)	Miami (FL) (2-1)	Miami (FL) (4-2)	LSU (9-1)	South Carolina (12-0)	South Carolina (17-0)	Rice (16-6)	Rice (20-6)	Rice (24-6)	Miami (FL) (26-7)	Miami (FL) (28-8)	Long Beach State (29-9)	Miami (FL) (33-9)	Rice (35-9)	Miami (FL) (37-11)	Rice (40-11)	Rice (43-12)	Miami (FL) (50-13)	4.
5.	Cal State Fullerton	Texas (6-0)	LSU (2-1)	LSU (6-1)	South Carolina (9-0)	LSU (12-2)	LSU (15-2)	South Carolina (19-2)	Miami (FL) (22-5)	Miami (FL) (24-6)	Long Beach State (23-8)	Long Beach State (26-9)	Miami (FL) (30-9)	LSU (34-12)	LSU (36-13)	LSU (38-14)	LSU (41-15)	South Carolina (45-15)	Georgia (44-22)	5.
6.	Texas	Georgia Tech (0-0)	Georgia Tech (2-0)	Georgia Tech (6-0)	Arizona State (12-2)	Arizona State (15-2)	Arizona State (17-3)	Miami (FL) (19-4)	South Carolina (21-4)	Ole Miss (24-4)	South Carolina (25-7)	Ole Miss (31-6)	LSU (31-11)	South Carolina (32-12)	Long Beach State (34-12)	South Carolina (39-13)	East Carolina (47-9)	Notre Dame (49-10)	LSU (46-19)	6.
7.	Georgia Tech	Arizona State (3-0)	Arizona State (5-1)	Arizona State (8-2)	Long Beach State (9-3)	Miami (FL) (11-3)	Miami (FL) (15-3)	Long Beach State (16-5)	Ole Miss (20-3)	South Carolina (23-5)	Ole Miss (26-6)	Notre Dame (30-5)	South Carolina (29-11)	East Carolina (38-6)	South Carolina (34-13)	East Carolina (45-8)	South Carolina (41-15)	East Carolina (48-11)	Arizona (36-27) т	7.
8.	South Carolina	South Carolina (0-0)	South Carolina (3-0)	South Carolina (6-0)	Miami (FL) (7-3)	Long Beach State (11-4)	Auburn (16-2)	Arizona State (20-5)	Long Beach State (18-7)	Long Beach State (20-8)	Notre Dame (25-4)	LSU (28-10)	Wichita State (28-7)	Long Beach State (30-12)	East Carolina (41-7)	Long Beach State (36-13)	Arizona State (39-14)	LSU (41-17)	Arkansas (45-24) т	8.
9.	Long Beach State	Long Beach State (2-1)	Long Beach State (4-2)	Long Beach State (7-2)	Notre Dame (6-0)	Auburn (13-1)	Notre Dame (12-1)	Ole Miss (18-1)	Notre Dame (17-3)	Notre Dame (22-3)	LSU (24-9)	South Carolina (26-10)	East Carolina (35-6)	Texas A&M (35-14)	Texas A&M (35-14)	Texas A&M (38-15)	Notre Dame (46-10)	Arizona State (40-16)	East Carolina (50-15)	9.
10.	Arizona State	Cal State Fullerton (3-3)	Tulane (2-0)	Tulane (5-1)	Tulane (8-1)	Notre Dame (7-1)	Long Beach State (13-5)	Wichita State (8-0)	Arizona State (21-7)	Wichita State (16-3)	Wichita State (20-5)	Wichita State (23-7)	Texas A&M (33-12)	Florida (34-12)	Florida (36-13)	Ole Miss (38-15)	Texas A&M (39-17)	Georgia Tech (41-19)	Long Beach State (40-21)	10.
11.	Baylor	Baylor (0-0)	Arizona (5-1)	Clemson (0-0)	Auburn (9-1)	Wichita State (3-0)	Wichita State (6-0)	Notre Dame (13-2)	Auburn (20-6)	Southern Miss (24-4)	Tennessee (29-5)	Auburn (26-12)	Notre Dame (32-8)	Notre Dame (35-9)	Notre Dame (37-9)	Notre Dame (42-9)	Long Beach State (36-16)	Arkansas (39-21)	Rice (46-14)	11.
12.	Tulane	Tulane (0-0)	Baylor (2-1)	Notre Dame (2-0)	Georgia Tech (6-3)	Tulane (10-3)	Texas A&M (18-2)	Texas A&M (21-4)	Wichita State (12-2)	Nebraska (21-5)	Auburn (24-10)	East Carolina (31-6)	Ole Miss (31-11)	Wichita State (30-9)	Ole Miss (35-15)	Tulane (37-15)	Ole Miss (39-17)	Long Beach State (36-16)	Georgia Tech (44-21)	12.
13.	Clemson	Wichita State (0-0)	Auburn (3-0)	Wichita State (0-0)	Wichita State (0-0)	Florida Atlantic (16-1)	Ole Miss (14-1)	Auburn (17-5)	Florida (24-5)	North Carolina (23-6)	Southern Miss (27-6)	Southern Miss (29-8)	Auburn (28-14)	Tulane (32-14)	Tulane (34-15)	Arizona State (35-13)	Virginia (42-11)	Ole Miss (39-19)	Stanford (46-14)	13.
14.	Wichita State	Clemson (0-0)	Clemson (0-0)	Auburn (5-1)	Nebraska (5-1)	Texas A&M (14-2)	Florida Atlantic (18-2)	Florida State (20-5)	Texas A&M (23-6)	Auburn (21-9)	Texas A&M (29-9)	Texas A&M (31-11)	Tulane (30-12)	Arizona State (30-13) т	Arizona State (32-13)	North Carolina (36-15)	Arkansas (37-19) т	Texas A&M (39-19)	Florida State (45-23)	14.
15.	Auburn	Auburn (0-0)	Wichita State (0-0)	North Carolina (3-0)	Florida Atlantic (12-1)	Ole Miss (11-0)	Florida (18-3)	Florida (20-5)	Southern Miss (20-4)	Arizona State (22-9)	Nebraska (24-7)	Tennessee (29-9)	Florida (31-12)	Ole Miss (33-14) т	Arkansas (33-16)	Florida (37-16)	Wichita State (43-13) т	Wichita State (47-14)	Texas A&M (42-22)	15.
16.	North Carolina	Notre Dame (0-0)	Notre Dame (0-0)	Florida Atlantic (10-0)	Texas A&M (12-1)	Florida (15-3)	Tulane (12-5)	Southern Miss (17-3)	Tulane (19-7)	Tulane (22-8)	Tulane (25-9)	Nebraska (26-9)	North Carolina (31-11)	North Carolina (31-11)	North Carolina (34-12)	Southern Miss (39-13) т	Tulane (38-17)	Cal State Fullerton (36-20)	Florida (43-22)	16.
17.	Notre Dame	Arizona (3-0)	Cal State Fullerton (4-5)	Nebraska (3-0)	Oklahoma (8-1)	Oklahoma (10-3)	NC State (14-3)	Nebraska (13-4)	Nebraska (16-5)	Texas A&M (26-8)	North Carolina (25-8)	Virginia (32-7)	Tennessee (31-11)	Arkansas (32-14)	Wichita State (34-12)	Virginia (40-11) т	Georgia Tech (38-17)	Florida State (42-20)	Tulane (41-21)	17.
18.	Florida State	North Carolina (0-0)	North Carolina (0-0)	Cal State Fullerton (6-6)	Ole Miss (6-0)	Georgia Tech (8-5)	Florida State (16-5)	Tulane (15-7)	North Carolina (20-6)	Tennessee (25-5)	East Carolina (28-6)	Arizona State (26-12)	Arizona State (28-13)	Virginia (36-9)	Southern Miss (36-13)	Wichita State (38-13)	Georgia (37-18)	Virginia (42-13)	Vanderbilt (45-19)	18.
19.	Arizona	Florida (2-0)	Florida Atlantic (7-0)	Arizona (5-3)	NC State (7-0)	Nebraska (6-3)	Southern Miss (14-2)	Florida Atlantic (21-4)	Florida State (21-7)	Florida (25-8)	UC Irvine (22-7)	Florida (28-11)	Nebraska (27-12)	Southern Miss (33-12)	Virginia (37-11)	Arkansas (35-18)	Cal State Fullerton (36-20)	North Carolina (41-19)	Notre Dame (51-12)	19.
20.	Florida	Nebraska (0-0)	Nebraska (0-0)	Baylor (3-4)	Cal State Fullerton (8-8)	NC State (10-2)	Virginia (17-2)	Tennessee (19-3)	Florida Atlantic (25-5)	UC Irvine (19-6)	Florida (26-10)	North Carolina (27-10)	Southern Miss (30-11)	Auburn (29-17)	Oral Roberts (37-8)	Oral Roberts (42-8)	North Carolina (38-17)	Georgia (38-20)	Arizona State (41-18)	20.
21.	Nebraska	USC (0-0)	Florida (3-2)	Ole Miss (3-0)	Arizona (7-5)	Florida State (11-5)	Nebraska (8-4)	North Carolina (16-5)	UC Irvine (18-6)	Florida State (23-9)	Arizona State (23-11)	Tulane (26-12)	Virginia (35-9)	Tennessee (33-13)	Washington (28-15)	Washington (32-16)	Florida (38-18)	Washington (37-18)	Virginia (44-15)	21.
22.	USC	Ole Miss (0-0)	Ole Miss (0-0)	Florida State (7-3)	Florida State (9-4)	Arizona (9-6)	East Carolina (16-3)	East Carolina (18-5)	East Carolina (21-6)	East Carolina (24-6)	Florida State (25-11)	Oral Roberts (31-7)	Arkansas (29-13)	Nebraska (30-14)	Auburn (30-19)	Georgia Tech (34-17)	Oral Roberts (45-9)	Oral Roberts (48-9)	Wichita State (49-16)	22.
23.	Ole Miss	Florida Atlantic (3-0)	USC (1-2)	Texas A&M (7-0)	Florida (10-3)	UC Irvine (12-3)	Arizona (11-7) т	NC State (15-6)	Tennessee (21-5)	UCF (27-5)	Virginia (29-7)	UC Irvine (23-10)	Oral Roberts (33-7)	Oral Roberts (37-8)	Nebraska (30-16) т	Georgia (35-17)	Southern Miss (40-15)	Vanderbilt (42-17)	Washington (39-20)	23.
24.	Florida Atlantic	Florida State (2-3)	Florida State (3-3)	NC State (4-0)	East Carolina (12-0)	Southern Miss (11-1)	Mississippi State (10-2) т	Georgia (16-4)	NC State (17-8)	Florida Atlantic (26-7)	Arkansas (23-11)	Arkansas (25-13)	UC Irvine (26-11)	Vanderbilt (31-13)	UC Irvine (31-13) т	Cal State Fullerton (33-20)	Washington (34-18)	Florida (40-20)	North Carolina (43-21)	24.
25.	NC State	NC State (0-0)	NC State (1-0)	Florida (6-3)	Clemson (2-3)	Mississippi State (7-0)	Oklahoma (11-6) т	Mississippi State (13-4)	Vanderbilt (18-5)	Washington (17-8)	Florida Atlantic (28-8)	Oklahoma (25-13)	Clemson (27-14)	UC Irvine (28-13)	Tennessee (34-15)	Florida State (34-19)	Florida State (37-19)	Tulane (38-19)	Ole Miss (39-21)	25.
	Preseason Jan 12	Week 1 Feb 09	Week 2 Feb 16	Week 3 Feb 23	Week 4 Mar 01	Week 5 Mar 08	Week 6 Mar 15	Week 7 Mar 22	Week 8 Mar 29	Week 9 Apr 05	Week 10 Apr 12	Week 11 Apr 19	Week 12 Apr 26	Week 13 May 03	Week 14 May 10	Week 15 May 17	Week 16 May 24	Week 17 May 31	Final Jun 28	
		None	None	Dropped: 23 USC	Dropped: 15 North Carolina; 20 Baylor	Dropped: 20 Cal State Fullerton; 24 East Carolina; 25 Clemson	Dropped: 18 Georgia Tech; 23 UC Irvine	Dropped: 20 Virginia; 23 Arizona; 23 Oklahoma	Dropped: 24 Georgia; 25 Mississippi State	Dropped: 24 NC State; 25 Vanderbilt	Dropped: 23 UCF; 25 Washington	Dropped: 22 Florida State; 25 Florida Atlantic	Dropped: 25 Oklahoma	Dropped: 25 Clemson	Dropped: 24 Vanderbilt	Dropped: 22 Auburn; 23 Nebraska; 23 UC Irvine; 25 Tennessee	None	Dropped: 23 Southern Miss	Dropped: 22 Oral Roberts	

== Baseball America ==
Currently, only the final poll from the 2004 season is available.

Rank	Team
1	Cal State Fullerton
2	Texas
3	South Carolina
4	Miami (FL)
5	Georgia
6	Arkansas
7	LSU
8	East Carolina
9	Stanford
10	Georgia Tech
11	Rice
12	Arizona
13	Long Beach State
14	Florida State
15	Notre Dame
16	Florida
17	Vanderbilt
18	Oral Roberts
19	Tulane
20	Texas A&M
21	Washington
22	Arizona State
23	Ole Miss
24	Virginia
25	Oklahoma

== Collegiate Baseball ==
	Preseason Dec 19	Week 1 Feb 9	Week 2 Feb 16	Week 3 Feb 23	Week 4 Mar 1	Week 5 Mar 8	Week 6 Mar 15	Week 7 Mar 22	Week 8 Mar 29	Week 9 Apr 5	Week 10 Apr 12	Week 11 Apr 19	Week 12 Apr 26	Week 13 May 3	Week 14 May 10	Week 15 May 17	Week 16 May 24	Week 17 May 31	Week 18 June 7	Week 19 June 14	Week 20 June 30	
1.	Rice т	Rice (0–0) т	Texas (9–0)	LSU (6–1)	LSU (9–1)	LSU (12–2)	LSU (15–2)	LSU (18–3)	Stanford (20–3)	Stanford (23–4)	Texas (35–4)	Texas (38–5)	Texas (41–6)	Stanford (35–6)	Texas (46–8)	Stanford (39–9)	Texas (48–11)	Miami (FL) (44–11)	Miami (FL) (47–11)	Miami (FL) (49–11)	Cal State Fullerton (47–22)	1.
2.	Miami (FL) т	Miami (FL) (0–0) т	Rice (2–1)	Stanford (10–2)	Stanford (13–2)	Stanford (15–3)	Stanford (15–3)	Stanford (15–3)	LSU (21–4)	LSU (24–5)	Stanford (25–5)	Stanford (29–5)	Stanford (31–6)	Texas (42–8)	Stanford (37–8)	Texas (46–10)	Stanford (42–11)	Stanford (44–12)	Texas (53–13)	Texas (55–13)	Texas (58–15)	2.
3.	LSU	LSU (0–0)	Miami (FL) (2–1)	Georgia Tech (6–0)	Texas (15–2)	Texas (19–2)	Texas (23–2)	Texas (26–3)	Texas (28–4)	Texas (31–4)	Rice (27–6)	Rice (30–7)	Rice (33–7)	Rice (33–7)	Miami (FL) (36–9)	RIce (38–9)	Miami (FL) (41–11)	Texas (50–13)	Georgia Tech (44–19)	Arkansas (45–22)	South Carolina (53–17)	3.
4.	Georgia Tech	Georgia Tech (0–0)	LSU (2–1)	Texas (11–2)	Rice (7–2)	South Carolina (12–0)	South Carolina (17–0)	South Carolina (19–2)	Ole Miss (20–3)	Notre Dame (22–3)	Notre Dame (25–4)	Notre Dame (30–5)	Miami (FL) (30–9)	Miami (FL) (33–9)	Rice (35–9)	East Carolina (45–8)	East Carolina (47–9)	Rice (43–12)	Arkansas (43–22)	Cal State Fullerton (42–21)	Georgia (45–23)	4.
5.	Texas	Texas (6–0)	Georgia Tech (2–0)	Rice (5–2)	South Carolina (9–0)	Arizona State (15–2)	Arizona State (17–3)	Ole Miss (18–1)	Notre Dame (17–3)	Ole Miss (24–4)	Miami (FL) (26–7)	Miami (FL) (28–8)	Long Beach State (29–9)	LSU (34–12)	East Carolina (41–7)	Miami (FL) (37–11)	Georgia Tech (38–17)	Georgia Tech (41–19)	Cal State Fullerton (40–21)	Georgia (43–21)	Miami (FL) (50–13)	5.
6.	Stanford	Stanford (5–1)	Stanford (8–1)	South Carolina (6–0)	Arizona State (12–2)	Rice (11–3)	Miami (FL) (15–3)	Notre Dame (13–2)	Miami (FL) (22–5)	Rice (24–6)	Tennessee (29–5)	Long Beach State (26–9)	LSU (31–11)	East Carolina (38–6)	Florida (36–13)	Notre Dame (42–9)	Rice (40–11)	Notre Dame (49–10)	Long Beach State (39–19)	LSU (46–170	Arizona (36–27–1)	6.
7.	Arizona State	Arizona State (3–0)	Arizona State (5–1)	Arizona State (8–2)	Notre Dame (6–0)	Miami (FL) (11–3)	Rice (14–4)	Wichita State (8–0)	Rice (20–6)	Miami (FL) (24–6)	UC Irvine (22–7–1)	Ole Miss (31–6)	Wichita State (28–7)	Virginia (36–9)	LSU (36–13)	Virginia (40–11)	Virginia (42–11)	East Carolina (48–11)	Georgia (41–21)	South Carolina (50–15)	Arkansas (45–24)	7.
8.	Cal State Fullerton	Cal State Fullerton (3–3)	South Carolina (3–0)	Miami (FL) (4–2)	Miami (FL) (7–3)	Notre Dame (7–1)	Notre Dame (12–1)	Miami (FL) (19–4)	Florida (24–5)	North Carolina (23–6)	Long Beach State (23–8)	LSU (28–10)	Notre Dame (32–8)	Notre Dame (35–9)	Notre Dame (37–9)	Georgia (35–17)	Notre Dame (46–10)	Virginia (42–13)	LSU (44–17)	Arizona (35–25–1)	LSU (46–19)	8.
9.	Wichita State	Wichita State (0–0)	Wichita State (0–0)	Wichita State (0–0)	Wichita State (0–0)	Wichita State (3–0)	Wichita State (6–0)	Arizona State (20–5)	North Carolina (20–6)	South Carolina (23–5)	Ole Miss (26–6)	UC Irvine (23–10–1)	East Carolina (35–6)	Arkansas (32–14)	Long Beach State (34–12)	LSU (38–14)	Arkansas (37–19)	Arkansas (39–21)	South Carolina (48–15)	Stanford (46–14)	Stanford (46–14)	9.
10.	Notre Dame	Notre Dame (0–0)	Notre Dame (0–0)	Notre Dame (2–0)	Long Beach State (9–3)	Florida Atlantic (16–1)	Auburn (16–2)	Rice (16–6)	Florida State (21–7)	UC Irvine (19–6–1)	North Carolina (25–8)	Tennessee (29–9)	Virginia (35–9)	Florida (34–12)	Virginia (37–11)	Georgia Tech (34–17)	Georgia (37–18)	Georgia (38–20)	East Carolina (51–11)	Rice (46–15)	Rice (46–14)	10.
11.	Baylor	Baylor (0–0)	Baylor (2–1)	Long Beach State (7–2)	Florida Atlantic (12–1)	Long Beach State (11–4)	Ole Miss (14–1)	Long Beach State (16–5)	South Carolina (21–4)	Long Beach State (20–8)	Wichita State (20–5)	Wichita State (23–7)	Clemson (27–14)	Long Beach State (30–12)	Arkansas (33–16)	Long Beach State (36–13)	LSU (41–15)	Washington (37–18–1)	Stanford (46–14)	Georgia Tech (44–21)	Georgia Tech (44–21)	11.
12.	Long Beach State	Long Beach State (2–1)	Long Beach State (4–2)	Florida Atlantic (10–0)	Texas A&M (12–1)	Auburn (13–1)	Florida (18–3)	Florida State (20–5)	UC Irvine (18–6–1)	Wichita State (16–3)	LSU (24–9)	Florida State (26–13)	Arkansas (29–13)	Wichita State (30–9)	Georgia (33–15)	Ole Miss (38–15)	Ole Miss (39–17)	LSU (41–17)	Rice (46–14)	Long Beach State (40–21)	Long Beach State (40–21)	12.
13.	Tulane	Tulane (0–0)	Tulane (2–0)	Tulane (5–1)	Tulane (8–1)	Texas A&M (14–2)	Texas A&M (18–2)	Tennessee (19–3)	Long Beach State (18–7)	Florida State (23–9)	South Carolina (25–7)	Auburn (26–12)	Florida (31–12)	Clemson (27–16)	Washington (28–15–1)	Washington (31–16–1)	Washington (34–18–1)	Cal State Fullerton (36–20)	Florida State (45–21)	East Carolina (51–13)	East Carolina (51–13)	13.
14.	South Carolina	South Carolina (0–0)	Arizona (5–1)	Texas A&M (7–0)	Auburn (9–1)	Florida (15–3)	Florida Atlantic (18–2)	Florida (20–5)	Wichita State (12–2)	Tennessee (25–5)	Florida State (25–11)	Oral Roberts (31–7)	Oral Roberts (33–7)	Oral Roberts (37–8)	Oral Roberts (37–8)	Oral Roberts (42–8)	Oral Roberts (45–9)	Ole Miss (39–19)	Tulane (41–19)	Florida State (45–23)	Florida State (45–23)	14.
15.	Florida	Florida (2–0)	Cal State Fullerton (4–5)	Auburn (5–1)	Nebraska (5–1)	Ole Miss (11–0)	Long Beach State (13–5)	Texas A&M (21–4)	Auburn (20–6)	Nebraska (21–5)	Tulane (25–9)	Virginia (32–7)	UC Irvine (26–11–1)	North Carolina (31–11)	Georgia Tech (30–17)	Arkansas (35–18)	Arizona State (39–14)	Oral Roberts (48–9)	Texas A&M (42–20)	Tulane (41–21)	Tulane (41–21)	15.
16.	Southern California	Southern California (0–0)	Florida Atlantic (7–0)	Nebraska (3–0)	Oklahoma (8–1)	Tulane (10–3)	Florida State (16–5)	North Carolina (16–4)	Tennessee (21–5)	Auburn (21–9)	Auburn (24–10)	East Carolina (31–6)	Ole Miss (31–11)	Washington (26–14–1)	North Carolina (34–12)	South Carolina (39–13)	Cal State Fullerton (36–20)	South Carolina (45–15)	Vanderbilt (45–17)	Texas A&M (42–22)	Texas A&M (42–22)	16.
17.	Clemson	Clemson (0–0)	Clemson (0–0)	Clemson (0–0)	Georgia Tech (6–3)	Mississippi State (7–0)	Tulane (12–5)	Auburn (17–5)	Arizona State (21–7)	Florida (25–8)	Nebraska (24–7)	Clemson (22–14)	Tennessee (31–11)	Arizona State (30–13)	Arizona State (32–13)	Arizona state (35–13)	Long Beach State (36–16)	Florida State (42–20)	Florida (43–20)	Vanderbilt (45–19)	Vanderbilt (45–19)	17.
18.	Auburn	Auburn (0–0)	Auburn (3–0)	North Carolina (3–0)	East Carolina (12–0)	UC Irvine (12–3–1)	NC State (14–3)	Nebraska (13–4)	Texas A&M (23–6)	Southern Miss (24–4)	Arkansas (23–11)	North Carolina (27–10)	North Carolina (31–11)	Ole Miss (33–14)	Ole Miss (35–15)	Florida (37–16)	South Carolina (41–15)	Arizona State (40–16)	Arizona (33–24–1)	Florida (43–22)	Florida (43–22)	18.
19.	Florida Atlantic	Florida Atlantic (3–0)	Florida (3–2)	Arizona (5–3–1)	Florida (10–3)	Florida State (11–5)	Tennessee (16–2)	UC Irvine (16–6–1)	Tulane (19–7)	UCF (27–5)	Florida (26–10)	Arkansas (25–13)	Auburn (28–14)	Georgia (30–15)	UCF (37–11)	North Carolina (36–15)	Florida State (37–19)	Long Beach State (36–19)	Notre Dame (51–12)	Notre Dame (51–12)	Notre Dame (51–12)	19.
20.	Nebraska	Nebraska (0–0)	Southern California (1–2)	Cal State Fullerton (6–6)	Oregon State (8–1)	Nebraska (6–3)	Virginia (17–2)	Tulane (15–7)	Nebraska (16–5)	College of Charleston (23–5)	Southern Miss (27–6)	Nebraska (26–9)	Tulane (30–12)	South Carolina (32–12)	Clemson (30–18)	UCF (39–12)	UCF (42–14)	UCF (44–16)	Virginia (44–15)	Virginia (44–15)	Virginia (44–15)	20.
21.	North Carolina	North Carolina (0–0)	Nebraska (0–0)	Florida (6–3)	Ole Miss (6–0)	Oklahoma (10–3)	Mississippi State (10–2)	NC State (15–6)	Southern Miss (20–4)	Arizona State (22–9)	Oral Roberts (26–7)	Florida (28–11)	Washington (24–13–1)	Georgia Tech (27–17)	South Carolina (34–13)	Oklahoma (34–18)	Oklahoma (36–20)	Oklahoma (37–22)	Washington (39–20–1)	Washington (39–20–1)	Washington (39–20–1)	21.
22.	Arizona	Arizona (3–0)	North Carolina (0–0)	Washington (5–1)	NC State (7–1)	Georgia Tech (8–5)	UC Irvine (14–5–1)	Florida Atlantic (21–4)	NC State (17–8)	Tulane (22–8)	College of Charleston (26–6)	South Carolina (26–10)	South Carolina (29–11)	Tennessee (33–13)	Oklahoma State (31–15)	Florida State (34–19)	Clemson (34–22)	Clemson (36–24)	Oral Roberts (50–11)	Oral Roberts (50–11)	Oral Roberts (50–11)	22.
23.	Washington	Washington (0–0)	Washington (2–1)	Florida State (7–3)	Florida State (9–4)	NC State (10–2)	Nebraska (8–4)	Southern Miss (17–3)	Florida Atlantic (25–5)	Clemson (17–10)	Virginia (29–7)	Southern Miss (29–8)	Georgia Tech (25–17)	Tulane (32–14)	Oklahoma (31–18)	Cal State Fullerton (33–20)	North Carolina (38–17)	North Carolina (41–19)	Arizona State (41–18)	Arizona State (41–18)	Arizona State (41–18)	23.
24.	Florida State	Florida State (2–3)	Florida State (3–3)	Lamar (6–2)	Mississippi State (3–0)	East Carolina (12–3)	East Carolina (16–3)	Mississippi State (13–4)	UCF (23–5)	NC State (20–10)	NC State (24–10)	Oklahoma (25–13)	Florida State (27–16)	Florida State (29–16)	Wichita State (34–12)	Tulane (37–15)	Wichita State (43–13)	Wichita State (47–14)	Ole Miss (39–21)	Ole Miss (39–21)	Ole Miss (39–21)	24.
25.	Minnesota	Minnesota (0–0)	Minnesota (0–0)	Minnesota (0–0)	UC Irvine (9–2–1)	North Carolina (8–3)	North Carolina (12–4)	East Carolina (18–5)	College of Charleston (20–5)	Georgia (19–10)	Oklahoma (22–11)	UCF (32–8)	Oklahoma (26–16)	Oklahoma State (28–18)	Tulane (34–15)	Wichita State (38–13)	Florida (38–18)	Southern Miss (44–17)	UCF (47–18)	UCF (47–18)	UCF (47–18)	25.
26.	UNLV	Ole Miss (0–0)	Ole Miss (0–0)	Ole Miss (3–0)	Arizona (7–5–1)	Tennessee (11–2)	Southern Miss (14–2)	Oral Roberts (16–4)	Oral Roberts (19–5)	Texas A&M (26–8)	UCF (29–7)	Tulane (26–12)	Oklahoma State (27–14)	Oklahoma (28–18)	Florida State (31–18)	Southern Miss (39–13)	Texas Tech (38–17)	Vanderbilt (42–17)	Clemson (39–26)	Clemson (39–26)	Clemson (39–26)	26.
27.	Ole Miss	Winthrop (0–0)	Winthrop (1–0)	NC State (4–0)	Cal State Fullerton (8–8)	Southern Miss (11–1)	Oral Roberts (13–3)	UNC Greensboro (15–4)	East Carolina (21–6)	Oral Roberts (23–6)	Texas A&M (29–9)	College of Charleston (28–7)	College of Charleston (32–7)	College of Charleston (35–8)	College of Charleston (37–9)	Oklahoma State (32–18)	Tulane (38–17)	Oklahoma State (37–22)	North Carolina (43–21)	North Carolina (43–21)	North Carolina (43–21)	27.
28.	Winthrop	NC State (0–0)	NC State 91–0)	Oklahoma (5–1)	Washington (6–3)	UNC Greensboro (10–1)	Lamar(15–4)	UCF (20–4)	UNC Greensboro (19–5)	East Carolina (24–6)	East Carolina (28–6)	NC State (27–12)	Texas Tech (27–13)	Texas Tech (31–13)	Cal State Fullerton (30–19)	Clemson (32–21)	Southern Miss (40–15)	Florida (40–20)	Wichita State (49–16)	Wichita State (49–16)	Wichita State (49–16)	28.
29.	NC State	Mississippi State (0–0)	Mississippi State (0–0)	Mississippi State (0–0)	Clemson (2–3)	Vanderbilt (10–1)	UNC Greensboro (12–3)	Georgia (16–4)	Birmingham–Southern (18–6)	Virginia (25–7)	Florida Atlantic (28–8)	Rutgers (20–13)	UCF (32–9)	Cal State Fullerton (28–18)	Southern Miss (36–19)	Texas Tech (34–17)	Texas A&M (39–17)	Tulane (38–19)	College of Charleston (47–16)	College of Charleston (47–16)	College of Charleston (47–16)	29.
30.	Mississippi State	Ohio State (0–0)	Texas A&M (3–0)	UC Irvine (5–2–1)	North Carolina (4–3)	Virginia (13–1)	Vanderbilt (13–2)	Birmingham–Southern (15–5)	Vanderbilt (18–5)	Oklahoma (19–10)	Georgia Tech (20–14)	Cal State Fullerton (23–16)	Georgia (26–15)	UCF (34–10)	Birmingham–Southern (37–13)	Texas A&M (38–15)	NC State (34–20)	Texas A&M (39–19)	Florida Atlantic (47–17)	Florida Atlantic (47–17)	Florida Atlantic (47–17)	30.
	Preseason Dec 19	Week 1 Feb 9	Week 2 Feb 16	Week 3 Feb 23	Week 4 Mar 1	Week 5 Mar 8	Week 6 Mar 15	Week 7 Mar 22	Week 8 Mar 29	Week 9 Apr 5	Week 10 Apr 12	Week 11 Apr 19	Week 12 Apr 26	Week 13 May 3	Week 14 May 10	Week 15 May 17	Week 16 May 24	Week 17 May 31	Week 18 June 7	Week 19 June 14	Week 20 June 30	
		Dropped: 26 UNLV	Dropped: 30 Ohio State	Dropped: 11 Baylor; 20 Southern California; 27 Winthrop	None	Dropped: 20 Oregon State; 26 Arizona; 27 Cal State Fullerton; 28 Washington; 29 Clemson	Dropped: 21 Oklahoma; 22 Georgia Tech	Dropped: 22 UC Irvine; 28 Lamar; 30 Vanderbilt	Dropped: 24 Mississippi State; 29 Georgia	Dropped: 23 Florida Atlantic; 28 UNC Greensboro; 29 Birmingham–Southern; 30 Vanderbilt	Dropped: 21 Arizona State; 23 Clemson; 25 Georgia	Dropped: 27 Texas A&M; 29 Florida Atlantic; 30 Georgia Tech	Dropped: 20 Nebraska; 23 Southern Miss; 28 NC State; 29 Rutgers; 30 Cal State Fullerton	Dropped: 30 Georgia	Dropped: 22 Tennessee; 28 Texas Tech	Dropped: 27 College of Charleston; 30 Birmingham–Southern	Dropped: 27 Oklahoma State	Dropped: 26 Texas Tech; 30 NC State	Dropped: 25 UCF; 27 North Carolina	None	None	

The preseason poll ranked the top 40. Teams not listed above were: 31. Ohio State 32. Texas A&M 33. Oklahoma State 34. UC Riverside 35. Alabama 36. VCU 37. Southern Miss 38. Tennessee 39. San Diego 40. Stetson

== NCBWA ==
	Preseason Jan 12	Week 1 Feb 9	Week 2 Feb 16	Week 3 Feb 23	Week 4 Mar 1	Week 5 Mar 8	Week 6 Mar 15	Week 7 Mar 22	Week 8 Mar 29	Week 9 Apr 5	Week 10 Apr 12	Week 11 Apr 19	Week 12 Apr 26	Week 13 May 3	Week 14 May 10	Week 15 May 17	Week 16 May 24	Week 17 May 31	Week 18 June 7	Week 19 June 14	Week 20 June 30	
1.	Rice	Rice (0–0)	Texas (9–0)	Stanford (10–2)	Stanford (13–2)	Stanford (15–3)	Stanford (15–3)	Stanford (15–3)	Stanford (20–3)	Texas (31–4)	Texas (35–4)	Texas (38–5)	Texas (41–6)	Stanford (35–6)	Texas (46–8)	Stanford (39–10)	Texas (48–11)	Miami (FL) (44–11)	Miami (FL) (47–11)	Miami (FL) (49–11)	Cal State Fullerton (47–22)	1.
2.	LSU	Stanford (5–1)	Rice (2–1)	Texas (11–2)	Texas (15–2)	Texas (19–2)	Texas (23–2)	Texas (26–3)	Texas (28–4)	Stanford (23–4)	Stanford (25–5)	Stanford (29–5)	Stanford (31–6)	Texas (42–8)	Stanford (37–8)	Texas (46–10)	Stanford (42–11)	Texas (50–13)	Texas (53–13)	Texas (55–13)	Texas (58–14)	2.
3.	Stanford	LSU (0–0)	Stanford (8–1)	Rice (5–2)	LSU (9–1)	South Carolina (12–0)	South Carolina (17–0)	LSU (18–3)	LSU (21–4)	LSU (24–5)	Rice (27–6)	Rice (30–7)	Rice (33–7)	Rice (33–7)	Miami (FL) (36–9)	Rice (38–9)	Miami (FL) (41–11)	Stanford (44–12)	East Carolina (51–11)	South Carolina (50–15)	South Carolina (52–17)	3.
4.	Georgia Tech	Texas (6–0)	Georgia Tech (2–0)	Georgia Tech (6–0)	Rice (7–2)	LSU (12–2)	LSU (15–2)	Miami (FL) (19–4)	Miami (FL) (22–5)	Miami (FL) (24–6)	Miami (FL) (26–7)	Miami (FL) (28–8)	Miami (FL) (30–9)	Miami (FL) (33–9)	Rice (35–9)	East Carolina (45–8)	East Carolina (47–9)	Rice (43–12)	South Carolina (48–15)	LSU (46–17)	Miami (FL) (50–13)	4.
5.	Miami (FL)	Georgia Tech (0–0)	Miami (FL) (2–1)	LSU (6–1)	Miami (FL) (7–3)	Rice (11–3)	Miami (FL) (15–3)	South Carolina (19–2)	Rice (20–6)	Rice (24–6)	Notre Dame (25–4)	Notre Dame (30–5)	Long Beach State (29–9)	East Carolina (38–6)	East Carolina (41–7)	Miami (FL) (37–11)	LSU (41–15)	Notre Dame (49–10)	Georgia Tech (44–19)	Cal State Fullerton (42–21)	Georgia (45–23)	5.
6.	Texas	Miami (FL) (0–0)	LSU (2–1)	Miami (FL) (4–2)	South Carolina (9–0)	Miami (FL) (11–3)	Rice (14–4)	Rice (16–6)	Notre Dame (17–3)	Notre Dame (22–3)	Tennessee (29–5)	Ole Miss (31–6)	LSU (31–11)	LSU (34–12)	LSU (36–13)	LSU (38–14)	Rice (40–11)	East Carolina (48–11)	Stanford (46–14)	Arkansas (45–22)	Arizona (36–27)	6.
7.	Cal State Fullerton	South Carolina (0–0)	South Carolina (3–0)	South Carolina (7–0)	Arizona State (12–2)	Arizona State (15–2)	Arizona State (17–3)	Notre Dame (13–2)	South Carolina (21–4)	South Carolina (23–5)	Tulane (25–9)	Long Beach State (26–9)	South Carolina (29–11)	South Carolina (32–12)	South Carolina (34–13)	South Carolina (39–13)	Notre Dame (46–10)	South Carolina (45–15)	Rice (46–14)	Georgia (43–21)	LSU (46–19)	7.
8.	Long Beach State	Arizona State (3–0)	Arizona State (5–1)	Arizona State (8–2)	Tulane (8–1)	Long Beach State (11–4)	Notre Dame (12–1)	Wichita State (8–0)	Auburn (20–6)	Ole Miss (24–4)	South Carolina (25–7)	LSU (28–10)	East Carolina (35–6)	Notre Dame (35–9)	Notre Dame (37–9)	Notre Dame (42–9)	Wichita State (43–13)	Wichita State (47–14)	LSU (44–17)	Arizona (35–25)	Arkansas (45–24)	8.
9.	South Carolina	Long Beach State (2–1)	Tulane (2–0)	Long Beach State (7–2)	Long Beach State (9–3)	Auburn (13–1)	Auburn (16–2)	Arizona State (20–5)	Arizona State (21–7)	Long Beach State (20–8)	Long Beach State (23–8)	South Carolina (25–7)	Notre Dame (32–8)	Long Beach State (30–12)	Long Beach State (34–12)	Ole Miss (38–15)	Cal State Fullerton (36–20)	Georgia Tech (41–19)	Cal State Fullerton (40–21)	Long Beach State (40–21)	Long Beach State (40–21)	9.
10.	Tulane	Cal State Fullerton (3–3)	Long Beach State (4–2)	Tulane (5–1)	Notre Dame (6–0)	Notre Dame (7–1)	Long Beach State (13–5)	Ole Miss (18–1)	Ole Miss (20–3)	North Carolina (23–6)	LSU (24–9)	East Carolina (31–6)	Wichita State (28–7)	Arkansas (32–14)	Ole Miss (35–15)	Long Beach State (36–13)	Virginia (42–11)	Cal State Fullerton (36–20)	Arkansas (43–22)	East Carolina (51–13)	East Carolina (51–13)	10.
11.	Arizona State	Tulane (0–0)	Wichita State (0–0	Notre Dame (2–0)	Auburn (9–1)	Tulane (10–3)	Wichita State (6–0)	Long Beach State (16–5)	Long Beach State (18–7)	Wichita State (16–3)	Ole Miss (26–6)	Wichita State (23–7)	Ole Miss (31–11)	Wichita State (30–9)	Tulane (34–15)	Tulane (37–15)	Georgia Tech (38–17)	LSU (41–17)	Long Beach State (39–19)	Georgia Tech (44–21)	Georgia Tech (44–21)	11.
12.	Wichita State	Wichita State (0–0)	Notre Dame (0–0)	Wichita State 90–0)	Wichita State (0–0)	Wichita State (3–0)	Ole Miss (14–1)	Tennessee (19–3)	Florida (23–5)	Tennessee (25–5)	Wichita State (20–5)	Southern Miss (29–8)	Southern Miss (30–11)	Ole Miss (33–14)	Southern Miss (36–13)	Southern Miss (39–13)	Oral Roberts (45–9)	Oral Roberts (48–9)	Georgia (41–21)	Stanford (46–14)	Stanford (46–14)	12.
13.	Notre Dame	Notre Dame (0–0)	Clemson (0–0)	Clemson (0–0)	Florida Atlantic (12–1)	Florida Atlantic (16–1)	Texas A&M (18–2)	Texas A&M (21–4)	Tennessee (21–5)	Arizona State (22–9)	Southern Miss (27–6)	Tennessee (29–9)	Arkansas (29–13)	Tulane (32–14)	Florida (36–13)	Wichita State (38–13)	Arkansas (37–19)	Virginia (42–13)	Notre Dame (51–12)	Rice (46–14)	Rice (46–14)	13.
14.	Clemson	Clemson 90–0)	Arizona (5–1)	Florida Atlantic (10–0)	Texas A&M (12–1)	Texas A&M (14–2)	Florida Atlantic (18–2)	Auburn (17–5)	Wichita State (12–2)	Southern Miss (24–4)	East Carolina (28–6)	Tulane (26–12)	Tulane (30–12)	Southern Miss (33–12)	Wichita State (30–9)	Oral Roberts (42–8)	Georgia (37–18)	Arkansas (39–21)	Tulane (41–19)	Notre Dame (51–12)	Notre Dame (51–120	14.
15.	Baylor	Arizona (3–0)	Baylor (2–1)	North Carolina (3–0)	Ole Miss (6–0)	Ole Miss (11–0)	Tulane (12–5)	Florida Atlantic (21–4)	Florida Atlantic (25–5)	Florida (25–8)	Nebraska (24–7)	Oklahoma (25–13)	Tennessee (31–11)	Florida (34–12)	Arkansas (33–16)	Arkansas (35–18)	Oklahoma (36–20)	Washington (37–18)	Florida (43–20)	Tulane (41–21)	Tulane (41–21)	15.
16.	Florida State baseball	Baylor (0–0)	Cal State Fullerton (4–5)	Washington (5–1)	Nebraska (5–1)	NC State 910–2)	Florida (18–3)	Florida (20–5)	North Carolina (20–6)	Nebraska (21–5)	Auburn (24–10)	Auburn (26–12)	Auburn (28–14)	Tennessee (33–13)	Oral Roberts (37–8)	Washington (32–16)	Ole Miss (39–17)	Georgia (37–18)	Florida State (45–21)	Florida (43–22)	Florida (43–22)	16.
17.	North Carolina	North Carolina (0–0)	North Carolina (0–00	Auburn (5–1)	NC State (7–0)	Florida (15–3)	NC State (14–3)	Southern Miss (17–3)	Southern Miss (20–4)	Florida Atlantic (26–7)	Texas A&M (29–9)	Nebraska (26–9)	Oral Roberts (33–7)	Oral Roberts (37–8)	Georgia (33–15)	Florida (37–16)	Washington (34–18)	Oklahoma (37–22)	Texas A&M (42–20)	Florida State (45–23)	Florida State (45–23)	17.
18.	Washington	Washington (0–0)	Washington (2–1)	Cal State Fullerton (6–6)	Florida (10–3)	Southern Miss (11–1)	Southern Miss (14–2)	North Carolina (16–5)	Texas A&M (23–6)	Tulane (22–8)	Florida Atlantic (28–8)	Oral Roberts (31–7)	Oklahoma (26–16)	Georgia (30–15)	Washington (28–15)	Texas A&M (38–15)	Florida (38–18)	Ole Miss (39–19)	Arizona (33–24)	Texas A&M (42–22)	Texas A&M (42–22)	18.
19.	Ole Miss	Florida State (3–2)	Florida State (3–3)	Florida State (7–3)	Oklahoma (8–1)	Oklahoma (10–3)	UC Irvine (14–5)	Tulane (15–7)	Tulane (19–7)	Auburn (21–9)	UC Irvine (22–7)	Texas A&M (31–11)	Texas A&M (33–12)	Texas A&M (35–14)	Texas A&M (35–14)	Georgia (35–17)	Texas A&M (39–17)	Florida (40–20)	Vanderbilt (42–17)	Vanderbilt (45–19)	Vanderbilt (45–19)	19.
20.	Arizona	Ole Miss (0–0)	Ole Miss (0–0)	Ole Miss (3–0)	Southern Miss (6–3)	Mississippi State (7–0)	Mississippi State (10–2)	Nebraska (13–4)	Nebraska (16–5)	UC Irvine (19–6)	Florida State (25–11)	Virginia (32–7)	Virginia (35–9)	Virginia (36–9)	Oklahoma State (31–16)	Oklahoma (34–18)	Arizona State 939–14)	Arizona State (40–16)	Wichita State (50–16)	Wichita State (49–16)	Wichita State (49–16)	20.
21.	Nebraska	Nebraska (0–0)	Nebraska (0–0)	Nebraska (3–0)	Cal State Fullerton (8–8)	UC Irvine (12–3)	Florida State (16–5)	UC Irvine (16–6)	UC Irvine (18–6)	East Carolina (24–6)	Florida (26–10)	UCF (32–8)	North Carolina (31–11)	Oklahoma State (29–15)	North Carolina (34–12)	North Carolina (36–15)	Tulane (38–17)	Southern Miss (44–17)	Oral Roberts (50–11)	Oral Roberts (50–11)	Oral Roberts (50–11)	21.
22.	NC State	NC State (0–0)	NC State (1–0)	Texas A&M (7–0)	Florida State (9–4)	Florida State (11–5)	East Carolina (16–3)	Florida State (20–5)	Florida State (21–7)	Florida State (23–9)	Oral Roberts (26–7)	North Carolina (27–10)	UCF (32–8)	North Carolina (31–11)	College of Charleston (37–9)	Virginia (40–11)	Texas Tech (38–17)	Lamar (41–14)	Virginia (44–15)	Virginia (44–15)	Virginia (44–15)	22.
23.	Texas A&M	Florida (2–0)	Florida Atlantic (7–0)	NC State (4–0)	VCU (8–2)	East Carolina (12–3)	Nebraska (8–4)	East Carolina (18–5)	East Carolina (19–6)	Texas A&M (26–8)	College of Charleston (26–6)	Florida (28–11)	Florida (31–12)	College of Charleston (35–8)	Tennessee (34–15)	Arizona State (35–13)	Southern Miss (40–15)	Tulane (38–19)	Washington (39–20)	Washington (39–2)	Washington (39–20)	23.
24.	Florida	Florida Atlantic (3–0)	Auburn (3–0)	Florida (6–3)	Mississippi State (3–0)	Nebraska (6–3)	North Carolina (12–4)	NC State (15–6)	NC State (17–8)	Oral Roberts (23–6)	North Carolina (25–8)	Florida State (26–13)	College of Charleston (32–7)	Oklahoma (28–18)	Oklahoma (31–18)	UCF (39–12)	South Carolina (41–15)	Florida State (42–20)	Texas Tech (40–21)	Texas Tech (40–21)	Texas Tech (40–21)	24.
25.	Florida Atlantic	Texas A&M (0–0)	Florida (3–2)	Southern Miss (3–0)	Oregon State (8–1)	North Carolina (8–3)	Virginia (17–2)	Mississippi State (13–4)	Oral Roberts (19–5)	College of Charleston (23–5)	Virginia (29–7)	College of Charleston (28–7)	Texas Tech (27–13)	Texas Tech (31–13)	Virginia (37–11)	Texas Tech (34–17)	Lamar (37–14)	Vanderbilt (42–17)	UCF (47–18)	UCF (47–18)	UCF (47–18)	25.
26.	Ohio State	Ohio State (0–0)	Texas A&M (3–0)	Winthrop (4–1)	Clemson (2–3)	Oklahoma State (10–4)	Arizona (11–7)	Missouri (18–4)	UNC Greensboro (19–5)	UCF (27–5)	UCF (29–7)	UC Irvine (23–10)	UC Irvine (26–11)	Auburn (29–17)	Arizona State (32–13)	Lamar (35–13)	Long Beach State (36–16)	Texas A&M (39–19)	Southern Miss (45–19)	Southern Miss (45–19)	Southern Miss (45–19)	26.
27.	UNLV	UC Riverside (0–0)	Stetson (2–1)	VCU (5–1)	Oklahoma State (8–2)	Georgia Tech (8–5)	Vanderbilt (13–2)	Oral Roberts (16–4)	College of Charleston (20–5)	Virginia (25–7)	NC State (24–10)	NC State (27–12)	Clemson (27–14)	UC Irvine (28–13)	UC Irvine (31–13)	Georgia Tech (34–17)	UCF (42–14)	Long Beach State (36–19)	Ole Miss (39–21)	Ole Miss (39–21)	Ole Miss (39–21)	27.
28.	UC Riverside	Stetson (0–0)	Winthrop (1–0)	Mississippi State (0–0)	East Carolina (12–0)	Arizona (9–6)	New Mexico State (16–4)	Georgia (15–4)	UCF (23–5)	NC State (20–10)	Oklahoma (22–11)	Vanderbilt (26–10)	Oklahoma State (27–14)	Florida State (29–16)	UCF (37–11)	Florida State (34–19)	Vanderbilt (39–16)	UCF (44–16)	Arizona State (41–18)	Arizona State (41–18)	Arizona State (41–18)	28.
29.	Stetson	Winthrop (0–0)	Southern Miss (0–0)	Stetson (4–2)	Washington (6–3)	UNC Greensboro (10–1)	Alabama (14–4)	UNC Greensboro (15–4)	Virginia (20–7)	Vanderbilt (21–7)	Vanderbilt (24–8)	Oklahoma State (24–13)	Washington (24–13)	Washington (26–14)	Texas Tech (32–15)	Vanderbilt (35–16)	Florida Atlantic (41–14)	Florida Atlantic (45–15)	Florida Atlantic (47–17)	Florida Atlantic (47–17)	Florida Atlantic (47–17)	29.
30.	Winthrop	Southern Miss (0–0)	VCU (3–0)	Oregon State (6–2)	North Carolina (4–3)	UAB (10–2)	Missouri (15–3)	UCF (20–4)	Kansas State (19–7)	New Mexico State (24–9)	Arkansas (23–11)	Arkansas (25–13)	Nebraska (27–12)	Arizona State (30–13)	Lamar (34–12)	Florida Atlantic (38–14)	College of Charleston (42–12)	College of Charleston (45–14)	Oklahoma (38–24)	Oklahoma (38–24)	Oklahoma (38–24)	30.
31.	Southern Miss	VCU (0–0)	Mississippi State (0–0)	Oklahoma (5–1)	Alabama (8–2)	Clemson (4–5)	Tennessee (16–2)	Virginia (18–5)	New Mexico State (22–7)	Clemson (17–10)	Washington (19–10)	Cal Poly (33–13)	Arizona State (28–13)	Nebraska (30–14)	Florida State (31–18)	College of Charleston (39–11)	NC State (34–20)	Texas Tech (38–19)	College of Charleston (47–16)	College of Charleston (47–16)	College of Charleston (47–16)	31.
32.	VCU	Mississippi State 90–0)	Southern (0–0)	Cal Poly (12–4)	UC Irvine (9–2)	New Mexico State (14–3)	Memphis (10–3)	Alabama (15–7)	Vanderbilt (18–5)	Oklahoma (19–10)	Oklahoma State (21–12)	Washington (21–13)	Georgia (26–15)	Vanderbilt (31–13)	Vanderbilt (33–14)	Cal State Fullerton (33–20)	North Carolina (38–17)	North Carolina (41–910	North Carolina (43–21)	North Carolina (43–21)	North Carolina (43–21)	32.
33.	Mississippi State	Southern 90–0)	Texas Tech (5–1)	Texas Tech (7–2)	Arizona (7–5)	Missouri (11–3)	Oklahoma State (12–5)	South Florida (17–6)	Washington (15–7)	Washington (17–8)	UNC Greensboro (21–7)	Cal State Fullerton (23–16)	Vanderbilt (27–13)	UCF (34–10)	Nebraska (31–16)	NC State (31–19)	Tennessee (36–20)	Oklahoma State (37–22)	Lamar (41–16)	Lamar (41–16)	Lamar (41–16)	33.
34.	Southern	UNLV (0–3)	UNLV (3–3)	Lamar (6–2)	Arkansas (11–3)	Memphis (6–2)	Washington (10–4)	Oklahoma State (15–7)	Oklahoma State (17–9)	Oklahoma State (20–11)	Arizona State (23–11)	Rutgers (20–13)	Georgia Tech (25–17)	Lamar (34–12)	Georgia Tech (30–17)	Oklahoma State (34–19)	St. John's (35–19)	Tennessee (37–22)	Oklahoma State (38–24)	Oklahoma State (38–24)	Oklahoma State (38–24)	34.
35.	Oklahoma State	California (0–0) т; Oklahoma State (0–0) т; Auburn (0–0) т	Oklahoma State (2–1)	Alabama (5–2) т; Oklahoma State (4–2) т	New Mexico State (10–3)	Cal Poly (17–7)	Georgia (12–3)	Kansas State (16–6)	Birmingham–Southern (18–6)	UNC Greensboro (20–7)	UNLV (22–11) т; Louisiana–Lafayette (22–9) т	UNLV (24–13)	Lamar (31–11)	Georgia Tech (27–17)	Florida Atlantic (36–13)	Tennessee (34–19)	Pittsburgh (38–16)	Birmingham–Southern (46–16)	Birmingham–Southern (47–18)	Birmingham–Southern (47–18)	Birmingham–Southern (47–18)	35.
	Preseason Jan 12	Week 1 Feb 9	Week 2 Feb 16	Week 3 Feb 23	Week 4 Mar 1	Week 5 Mar 8	Week 6 Mar 15	Week 7 Mar 22	Week 8 Mar 29	Week 9 Apr 5	Week 10 Apr 12	Week 11 Apr 19	Week 12 Apr 26	Week 13 May 3	Week 14 May 10	Week 15 May 17	Week 16 May 24	Week 17 May 31	Week 18 June 7	Week 19 June 14	Week 20 June 30	
		None	Dropped: 26 Ohio State; 27 UC Riverside; 35 California	Dropped: 14 Arizona; 15 Baylor; 32 Southern; 34 UNLV	Dropped: 4 Georgia Tech; 26 Winthrop; 29 Stetson; 32 Cal Poly; 33 Texas Tech; 34 Lamar	Dropped: 21 Cal State Fullerton; 23 VCU; 25 Oregon State; 29 Washington; 31 Alabama; 34 Arkansas	Dropped: 19 Oklahoma; 27 Georgia Tech; 29 UNC Greensboro; 30 UAB; 31 Clemson; 35 Cal Poly	Dropped: 26 Arizona; 27 Vanderbilt; 28 New Mexico State; 32 Memphis; 34 Washington	Dropped: 25 Mississippi State; 26 Missouri; 28 Georgia; 32 Alabama; 33 South Florida	Dropped: 30 Kansas State; 35 Birmingham–Southern	Dropped: 30 New Mexico State; 31 Clemson	Dropped: 18 Florida Atlantic; 33 UNC Greensboro; 34 Arizona State; 35 Louisiana–Lafayette	Dropped: 24 Florida State; 27 NC State; 31 Cal Poly; 33 Cal State Fullerton; 34 Rutgers; 35 UNLV	Dropped: 27 Clemson	Dropped: 26 Auburn	Dropped: 27 UC Irvine; 33 Nebraska	Dropped: 28 Florida State; 34 Oklahoma State	Dropped: 31 NC State; 34 St. John's; 35 Pittsburgh	Dropped: 34 Tennessee	None	None	
