= Kevin Melillo =

American baseball player (born 1982)

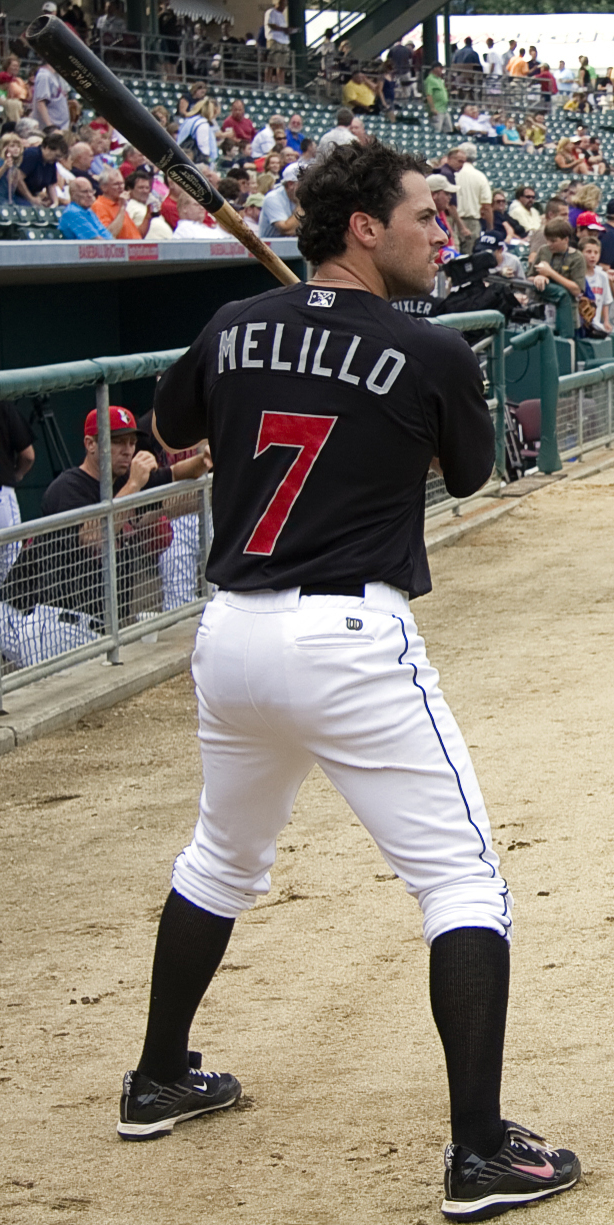
- Melillo with the Indianapolis Indians in 2010
- Infielder/Outfielder
- Born: May 14, 1982 (age 44); Orlando, Florida, U.S.
- Batted: Left Threw: Right

MLB debut
- June 24, 2007, for the Oakland Athletics

Last MLB appearance
- June 24, 2007, for the Oakland Athletics

MLB statistics
- On-base percentage: 1.000
- Plate appearances: 1
- Walks: 1
- Stats at Baseball Reference

Teams
- Oakland Athletics (2007)
Medals
Men's baseball
Representing United States
World Youth Baseball Championship
Gold medal – first place	1998 Fairview Heights	Team

Kevin Michael Melillo (born May 14, 1982) is an American former professional baseball player.

== Early and personal life ==
Melillo was born on May 14, 1982, to Joanne and John Melillo in Orlando, Florida. He has an older sister, Shana. He attended Lake Brantley High School in Altamonte Springs. He attended the University of South Carolina, where he played second base for four years (although he was redshirted his freshman year). In 2003, he was named to the Atlanta NCAA Regional All-Tournament team. In 2004, he was named to the Columbia NCAA Regional All-Tournament team.

== Professional career ==
Melillo was selected by the Oakland Athletics in the 5th round (157th overall) in the 2004 baseball draft.

Melillo signed nine days after the draft, and was assigned to the Vancouver Canadians, Oakland's A-Short Season team for the 2004 season. In 2005, he was advanced to the Kane County Cougars, the team's Single-A affiliate. After 78 games, he was bumped up to the Stockton Ports, the Single-A Advanced team, where he hit .400. After 22 games, he was promoted again, this time to the Double-A Midland RockHounds in the Texas League. He remained with Midland for the 2006 season, hitting .280. During this time, he played almost entirely at second base, with five combined games at first base, shortstop, and outfield.

In 2007, Melillo was promoted to Triple-A Sacramento River Cats. On June 24, 2007, he made his major league debut against the New York Mets, as a pinch hitter for pitcher Jay Marshall. Leading off the top of the eighth, Melillo was walked by Guillermo Mota in his only major league plate appearance and game. He became the first player since John Paciorek in 1963 to draw a walk in his only major league game, and one of only five players in major league history to draw a walk in his only plate appearance and never take the field. The next day, Melillo was optioned back to Sacramento. He spent one month of the 2007 season (from July 3 to August 2) on the disabled list with a sprained left wrist.

On June 5, 2008, Melillo was traded by Oakland to the Toronto Blue Jays for cash considerations and was assigned to the Triple-A Syracuse Chiefs. In Syracuse, he played in more games at first and third base than he did at second base. On April 1, 2009, he was released by Toronto. Less than a week later, he signed a minor league contract with the Milwaukee Brewers and was assigned to the Double-A Huntsville Stars. He batted .249 in 113 game with Huntsville, again playing more at first and third base, and just 12 games at second base. On November 9, 2009, he was granted free agency.

On January 29, 2010, he signed as a free agent with the Pittsburgh Pirates and was converted to an outfielder.

The Los Angeles Angels of Anaheim signed Melillo to a minor league contract with an invite to spring training on January 14, 2011. He played 46 games for the Angels triple-A affiliate in Salt Lake City, hitting .284, and thereafter retired from professional baseball.
