= 2003 NCAA Division I baseball rankings =

2003 NCAA Division I baseball season
- Duration: January 16-June 23, 2003
- Number of teams: 287

Tournament
- Duration: May 30–June 23, 2003
- Most conference bids: SEC (8)

College World Series
- Duration: June 13–June 23, 2003
- Champions: Rice (1st title)
- Runners-up: Stanford
- MOP: John Hudgins

Seasons
- ← 2002 2004 →

The following polls make up the 2003 NCAA Division I baseball rankings. USA Today and ESPN began publishing the Coaches' Poll of 31 active coaches ranking the top 25 teams in the nation in 1992. Each coach is a member of the American Baseball Coaches Association. Baseball America began publishing its poll of the top 20 teams in college baseball in 1981. Beginning with the 1985 season, it expanded to the top 25. Collegiate Baseball Newspaper published its first human poll of the top 20 teams in college baseball in 1957, and expanded to rank the top 30 teams in 1961.

== Legend ==
	Increase in ranking
	Decrease in ranking
	Not ranked previous week
Italics	Number of first place votes
(#-#)	Win–loss record
т	Tied with team above or below also with this symbol

== USA Today/ESPN Coaches' Poll ==
Currently, only the final poll from the 2003 season is available.

Rank	Team
1	Rice
2	Stanford
3	Cal State Fullerton
4	Texas
5	Miami (FL)
6	LSU
7	South Carolina
8	Florida State
9	Arizona State
10	Long Beach State
11	Missouri State
12	NC State
13	Baylor
14	Nebraska
15	Texas A&M
16	Georgia Tech
17	Auburn
18	Southern Miss
19	Mississippi State
20	Ohio State
21	North Carolina
22	UNLV
23	Richmond
24	Houston
25	Florida Atlantic

== Baseball America ==
Currently, only the final poll from the 2003 season is available.

Rank	Team
1	Rice
2	Stanford
3	Cal State Fullerton
4	Texas
5	LSU
6	Florida State
7	Arizona State
8	Miami (FL)
9	Long Beach State
10	South Carolina
11	Baylor
12	NC State
13	Nebraska
14	Texas A&M
15	Southern Miss
16	Missouri State
17	Georgia Tech
18	Auburn
19	North Carolina
20	UNLV
21	Ohio State
22	Houston
23	Florida Atlantic
24	Mississippi State
25	Washington

== Collegiate Baseball ==
	Preseason Dec 23	Week 1 Feb 3	Week 2 Feb 10	Week 3 Feb 17	Week 4 Feb 24	Week 5 Mar 3	Week 6 Mar 10	Week 7 Mar 17	Week 8 Mar 24	Week 9 Mar 31	Week 10 Apr 7	Week 11 Apr 14	Week 12 Apr 21	Week 13 Apr 28	Week 14 May 5	Week 15 May 12	Week 16 May 19	Week 17 May 26	Week 18 June 2	Week 19 June 9	Week 20 June 24	
1.	Texas	Texas (3–0)	Texas (5–1)	Texas (10–1)	Florida State (11–1)	Florida State (14–1)	Arizona State (28–1)	Arizona State (30–2)	Rice (24–1)	Rice (28–1)	Rice (32–1)	Rice (35–3)	Cal State Fullerton (34–8)	Cal State Fullerton (38–8)	Florida State (40–8–1)	Florida State (44–8–1)	Florida State (47–8–1)	Rice (48–10)	Rice (51–10)	Rice (53–11)	Rice (58–12)	1.
2.	Florida State	Florida State (3–0)	Florida State (5–1)	Florida State (8–1)	Cal State Fullerton (11–1)	Cal State Fullerton (14–1)	Georgia Tech (14–0)	Florida State (24–2)	Georgia Tech (20–2)	Florida State (28–5)	Florida State (31–5)	Florida State (33–6)	Florida State (36–6–1)	Florida State (38–7–1)	Rice (40–7)	Rice (43–8)	Rice (46–9)	Florida State (50–10–1)	Florida State (54–11–1)	Cal State Fullerton (48–14)	Stanford (51–18)	2.
3.	Southern California	Southern California (0–0)	Cal State Fullerton (6–0)	Cal State Fullerton (8–1)	Georgia Tech (6–0)	Georgia Tech (9–0)	Florida State (19–2)	Georgia Tech (17–1)	Florida State (25–4)	Cal State Fullerton (24–6)	Cal State Fullerton (27–7)	Cal State Fullerton (30–8)	Stanford (26–11)	Rice (40–7)	Stanford (31–14)	Stanford (35–14)	Stanford (38–15)	Stanford (41–15)	Stanford (44–15)	Stanford (46–15)	Cal State Fullerton (50–16)	3.
4.	Rice	Rice (0–0)	Rice (0–0)	Georgia Tech (2–0)	Arizona State (21–1)	Arizona State (24–1)	Rice (15–1)	Rice (19–1)	Arizona State (32–4)	Stanford (18–9)	Stanford (20–10)	Stanford (23–10)	Georgia Tech (32–7)	Arizona State (42–9)	Arizona State (43–9)	Arizona State (44–9)	Arizona State (47–11)	Arizona State (50–12)	Arizona State (53–12)	LSU (45–20–1)	Texas (50–20)	4.
5.	Georgia Tech	Georgia Tech (0–0)	Georgia Tech (0–0)	Arizona State (17–1)	Rice (8–1)	Rice (11–1)	Cal State Fullerton (16–3)	Cal State Fullerton (18–4)	Cal State Fullerton (21–5)	Arizona State (34–6)	Georgia Tech (24–6)	Georgia Tech (28–6)	Rice (37–6)	NC State (36–10)	Long Beach State (32–14)	Long Beach State (36–14)	Long Beach State (37–16)	Cal State Fullerton (43–13)	Cal State Fullerton (46–13)	Texas (48–18)	Miami (FL) (45–17–1)	5.
6.	LSU	LSU (0–0)	LSU (3–0)	Rice (3–1)	South Carolina (8–1)	South Carolina (9–2)	South Carolina (13–3)	Long Beach State (16–6)	Stanford (15–8)	Mississippi State (22–3–1)	Arizona State (34–7)	Arizona State (38–7)	NC State (33–9)	LSU (30–13–1)	Cal State Fullerton (38–11)	Cal State Fullerton (41–12)	Cal State Fullerton (43–13)	Long Beach state (38–18)	Long Beach State (41–18)	Miami (FL (44–15–1)	South Carolina (45–22)	6.
7.	Cal State Fullerton	Cal State Fullerton (3–0)	Arizona State (14–1)	South Carolina (4–1)	Stanford (9–6)	Baylor (12–3)	Stanford (14–7)	Stanford (14–7)	Long Beach State (16–7)	Miami (FL) (23–4)	Mississippi State (24–5–1)	LSU (24–11–1)	Arizona State (39–9)	Stanford (28–13)	Texas (37–14)	Texas (37–14)	Nebraska (42–14)	LSU (40–19–1)	LSU (43–19–1)	South Carolina (44–20)	LSU (45–22–1)	7.
8.	South Carolina	South Carolina (0–0)	South Carolina (2–1)	Long Beach State (6–3)	Texas (12–3)	Stanford (11–7)	Long Beach State (13–6)	Baylor (17–6)	Baylor (21–6)	Georgia Tech (21–5)	LSU (21–10–1)	NC State (30–8)	LSU (26–13–1)	Texas (35–13)	LSU (32–16–1)	LSU (35–17–1)	LSU (37–18–1)	Texas (43–17)	Texas (46–18)	SW Missouri State (40–24)	SW Missouri State (40–26)	8.
9.	Stanford	Arizona State (11–1)	Long Beach State (3–3)	Southern California (5–2)	Long Beach State (8–4)	Long Beach State (10–5)	Baylor (14–5)	Mississippi State (13–2–1)	Mississippi State (17–3–1)	Long Beach State (18–9)	NC State (27–7)	Auburn (29–8)	Long Beach State (26–12)	Long Beach State (29–13)	NC State (38–12)	NC State (38–12)	Texas A&M (41–15)	Nebraska (44–16)	NC State (45–16)	Florida State (54–13–1)	Florida State (54–13–1)	9.
10.	Houston	Houston (0–0)	Southern California (2–2)	Mississippi State (0–0)	Wake Forest (4–1)	Mississippi State (5–1)	Mississippi State (9–1–1)	Texas (18–7)	Clemson (16–3)	LSU (18–9–1)	Auburn (27–7)	Texas (29–11)	Nebraska (29–10)	Nebraska (33–11)	Nebraska (36–13)	Nebraska (38–12)	Texas (38–16)	Georgia Tech (44–16)	Miami (FL) (42–15–1)	Arizona State (54–14)	Arizona State (54–14)	10.
11.	Mississippi State	Mississippi State (0–0)	Mississippi State (0–0)	Stanford (6–5)	Baylor (8–3)	Texas (13–5)	Texas (15–6)	South Carolina (15–5)	Richmond (18–2)	Auburn (24–6)	Long Beach State (20–11)	Mississippi State (25–7–1)	Texas (31–13)	Georgia Tech (32–11)	Georgia Tech (33–13)	Georgia Tech (37–13)	Georgia Tech (39–15)	Texas A&M (43–17)	South Carolina (42–20)	Long Beach State (41–20)	Long Beach State (41–20)	11.
12.	Arizona State	Stanford (2–3)	Stanford (3–5)	LSU (4–3)	Mississippi State (2–1)	Richmond (3–0)	Richmond (10–1)	Richmond (13–2)	LSU (16–7–1)	NC State (23–7)	Miami (FL) (25–6)	Long Beach State (23–12)	Auburn (31–10)	Texas A&M (35–13)	Texas A&M (35–13)	Texas A&M (39–13)	NC State (39–14)	NC State (42–16)	Baylor (44–21)	NC State (45–18)	NC State (45–18)	12.
13.	Long Beach State	Long Beach State (1–2)	Houston (1–2)	Miami (FL) (4–2)	Miami (FL) (7–2)	Wake Forest (5–3)	Miami (FL) (12–3)	Miami (FL) (15–4)	Miami (FL) (19–4)	Florida (22–6–1)	Clemson (23–7)	Notre Dame (25–6)	Mississippi State (28–9–1)	Notre Dame (34–9)	Richmond (39–8)	Florida Atlantic (42–11)	Florida Atlantic (44–12)	Miami (FL) (39–14–1)	Georgia Tech (44–18)	Baylor (45–23)	Baylor (45–23)	13.
14.	Miami (FL)	Miami (FL) (0–0)	Miami (FL) (3–1)	Wake Forest (2–1)	LSU (6–4)	Miami (FL) (9–3)	Auburn (16–3)	Clemson (11–3)	Auburn (22–5)	Wake Forest (19–7)	Nebraska (23–7)	Miami (FL) (27–7)	Texas A&M (32–12)	Richmond (33–8)	Florida Atlantic (39–11)	Richmond (42–11)	South Carolina (38–18)	Florida Atlantic (46–14)	SW Missouri State (38–24)	Georgia Tech (44–18)	Georgia Tech (44–18)	14.
15.	Wake Forest	Wake Forest (0–0)	Wake Forest (0–0)	Richmond (0–0)	Richmond (2–0)	Auburn (12–3)	Wake Forest (9–4)	LSU (13–7–1)	Texas (19–9)	Clemson (19–6)	Texas (25–11)	Clemson (25–9)	Richmond (31–7)	Florida Atlantic (37–10)	Clemson (32–13)	Miami (FL) (33–13–1)	Arizona (35–17)	South Carolina (39–20)	Nebraska (47–18)	Nebraska (47–18)	Nebraska (47–18)	15.
16.	Richmond	Richmond (0–0)	Richmond (0–0)	Baylor (4–3)	Texas A&M (7–2)	Florida (11–1)	Florida (13–3)	Wake Forest (13–5)	NC State (21–5)	Baylor (22–9)	Notre Dame (20–6)	Nebraska (25–9)	Notre Dame (29–8)	Clemson (31–13)	Miami (FL) (32–11–1)	Auburn (35–16)	Auburn (38–17)	Auburn (40–19)	Ohio State (44–19)	Houston (37–30)	Houston (37–30)	16.
17.	Baylor	Baylor (0–0)	Baylor (2–2)	Clemson (0–0)	Kansas (11–3)	Kansas (13–4)	Kansas (16–4)	Auburn (18–5)	Arizona (21–8)	Richmond (20–4)	Oklahoma State (21–9)	Florida Atlantic (32–9)	Miami (FL) (28–9–1)	Miami (FL) (29–11–1)	Auburn (34–14)	Arizona (33–17)	Miami (FL) (37–13–1)	Richmond (46–13)	Houston (36–28)	Texas A&M (45–19)	Texas A&M (45–19)	17.
18.	Clemson	Clemson (0–0)	Clemson (0–0)	Notre Dame (0–0)	Auburn (8–3)	LSU (7–6)	LSU (11–6)	Alabama (16–3)	Florida (19–6–1)	Nebraska (19–6)	Florida Atlantic (30–8)	Texas A&M (29–11)	Florida Atlantic (34–10)	Auburn (32–13)	Mississippi State (33–13–1)	Mississippi State (34–15–1)	Richmond (44–13)	Mississippi State (40–18–1)	Texas A&M (45–19)	Ohio State (44–21)	Ohio State (44–21)	18.
19.	Notre Dame	Notre Dame (0–0)	Notre Dame (0–0)	Texas A&M (3–1)	Clemson (1–2)	Clemson (3–3)	Clemson (8–3)	Kansas (18–6)	Wake Forest (15–7)	Texas (21–11)	Wake Forest (20–10)	Richmond (27–6)	Missouri (27–12)	Mississippi State (30–12–1)	Arizona (33–17)	Lamar (35–13)	Mississippi State (38–16–1)	Southern Miss (45–14)	North Carolina (42–21)	North Carolina (42–23)	North Carolina (42–23)	19.
20.	South Alabama	South Alabama (0–0)	South Alabama (0–0)	Houston (2–4)	Notre Dame (2–2)	Nebraska (7–2)	Nebraska (9–2)	Arizona (17–7)	Alabama (18–5)	Alabama (20–7)	Missouri (23–8)	Baylor (25–14)	Oklahoma State (26–13)	Arizona (30–16)	Notre Dame (36–12)	South Carolina (35–17)	Lamar (37–14)	UNLV (45–15)	Auburn (42–21)	Auburn (42–21)	Auburn (42–21)	20.
21.	Florida Atlantic	Florida Atlantic (3–0)	Florida Atlantic (5–0)	Kansas (9–3)	Southern California (5–6)	Arizona (11–5)	Arizona (12–7)	Texas A&M (19–5)	South Carolina (16–8)	Arizona (22–10)	Baylor (23–12)	Oklahoma State (23–11)	Arkansas (30–8)	Southern Miss (34–11)	UC Riverside (36–12)	Baylor (35–17)	Clemson (38–18)	Baylor (41–21)	Richmond (48–15)	Richmond (48–15)	Richmond (48–15)	21.
22.	Nebraska	Nebraska (0–0)	Nebraska (0–0)	Nebraska (2–1)	Tulane (8–1)	Texas A&M (10–4)	Texas A&M (15–4)	Florida (15–5–1)	Nebraska (14–6)	South Carolina (19–9)	Richmond (23–6)	Wake Forest (21–12)	Southern Miss (30–10)	Lamar (31–12)	Lamar (33–12)	Rutgers (30–16)	Baylor (37–19)	Lamar (37–16)	Lamar (40–18)	Lamar (40–18)	Lamar (40–18)	22.
23.	Tulane	Tulane (0–0)	Tulane (3–0)	Auburn (6–1)	Florida (8–1)	Tennessee (9–1)	UNC Greensboro (14–1)	Arkansas (16–2)	North Carolina (16–7)	Oklahoma State (17–8)	Florida (23–9–1)	Missouri (25–10)	Clemson (27–12)	Alabama (31–13)	New Mexico State (38–11)	Notre Dame (37–14)	Rutgers (33–18)	Tulane (43–17)	Florida Atlantic (47–16)	Florida Atlantic (47–16)	Florida Atlantic (47–16)	23.
24.	SW Missouri State	SW Missouri State (0–0)	SW Missouri State (0–0)	Tulane (5–1)	Tennessee (8–0)	Wichita State (9–1)	Alabama (12–3)	Nebraska (11–4)	Southern Miss (17–6)	Notre Dame (16–6)	Texas A&M (26–10)	Minnesota (20–11)	Baylor (27–16)	Missouri (28–15)	Minnesota (31–15)	Southern Miss (39–13)	Southern Miss (41–14)	Washington (40–16)	Mississippi State (42–20–1)	Mississippi State (42–20–1)	Mississippi State (42–20–1)	24.
25.	California	UCF (0–0)	FIU (6–1)	FIU (10–1)	Wichita State (9–1)	UNC Greensboro (10–0)	Wichita State (12–3)	NC State (18–4)	Texas Tech (19–9)	Florida Atlantic (27–7)	Arkansas (25–6)	Arizona (26–12)	North Carolina (31–11)	Minnesota (27–14)	Baylor (34–17)	South Alabama (36–14)	South Alabama (39–15)	Arizona (35–21)	Southern Miss (47–16)	Southern Miss (47–16)	Southern Miss (47–16)	25.
26.	UCF	Oklahoma (0–0)	UCF (0–1)	Tennessee (6–0)	Nebraska (4–2)	Notre Dame (3–4)	Notre Dame (4–4)	Notre Dame (9–5)	South Alabama (17–7)	Texas A&M (23–9)	Arizona (24–11)	Arkansas (27–7)	Pepperdine (26–15)	Oklahoma State (28–15)	Western Carolina (34–14)	Pepperdine (34–18)	Notre Dame (40–15)	Notre Dame (43–16)	UNLV (47–17)	UNLV (47–17)	UNLV (47–17)	26.
27.	Oklahoma	James Madison (0–0)	Oklahoma (0–0)	Wichita State (3–0)	North Carolina (4–0)	UAB (13–0)	Arkansas (11–1)	UAB (17–3)	Tennessee (14–8)	Arkansas (22–5)	Southern Miss (23–9)	Southern Miss (26–10)	Minnesota (23–13)	Pepperdine (28–16)	Pepperdine (31–17)	Minnesota (34–17)	Minnesota (37–18)	Clemson (38–20)	Washington (42–18)	Washington (42–18)	Washington (42–18)	27.
28.	James Madison	FIU (5–0)	James Madison (0–0)	Oklahoma (1–1)	UNC Greensboro (8–0)	Arkansas (8–0)	Tulane (13–4)	Coastal Carolina (18–4)	Kansas (20–9)	North Carolina (19–9)	UNLV (26–9)	South Alabama (25–10)	Arizona (28–14)	Baylor (30–17)	Southern Miss (36–13)	Western Carolina (35–15)	TCU (35–20)	South Alabama (40–17)	Notre Dame (45–18)	Notre Dame (45–18)	Notre Dame (45–18)	28.
29.	Ohio State	Ohio State (0–0)	Ohio State (0–0)	Ohio State (0–0)	Oklahoma (3–1)	Tulane (9–4)	South Florida (11–4)	Wichita State (13–5)	Ole Miss (15–7)	Southern Miss (20–8)	Western Carolina (23–10)	Lamar (25–10)	TCU (26–15)	TCU (29–16)	Rutgers (26–15)	TCU (33–19)	UNLV (41–15)	Southern (45–5)	South Alabama (42–19)	South Alabama (42–19)	South Alabama (42–19)	29.
30.	Wichita State	Wichita State (0–0)	Wichita State (0–0)	Florida (4–1)	Ohio State (0–0)	Oklahoma (5–2)	Oklahoma (8–3)	Oklahoma (11–5)	Washington (16–7)	Texas Tech (20–11)	South Alabama (21–9)	Wichita State (27–12)	UNLV (32–11)	UNLV (35–12)	UNLV (37–13)	UNLV (39–14)	Southern (46–5) т; UC Riverside (40–15) т	UC Riverside (40–15)	UC Riverside (41–17)	UC Riverside (41–17)	UC Riverside (41–17)	30.
	Preseason Dec 23	Week 1 Feb 3	Week 2 Feb 10	Week 3 Feb 17	Week 4 Feb 24	Week 5 Mar 3	Week 6 Mar 10	Week 7 Mar 17	Week 8 Mar 24	Week 9 Mar 31	Week 10 Apr 7	Week 11 Apr 14	Week 12 Apr 21	Week 13 Apr 28	Week 14 May 5	Week 15 May 12	Week 16 May 19	Week 17 May 26	Week 18 June 2	Week 19 June 9	Week 20 June 24	
		Dropped: 25 California	None	Dropped: 20 South Alabama; 21 Florida Atlantic; 24 SW Missouri State; 26 UCF; 28 James Madison	Dropped: 20 Houston; 25 FIU	Dropped: 21 Southern California; 27 North Carolina; 30 Ohio State	Dropped: 23 Tennessee; 27 UAB	Dropped: 24 Alabama; 28 Tulane; 29 South Florida	Dropped: 21 Texas A&M; 23 Arkansas; 26 Notre Dame; 27 UAB; 28 Coastal Carolina; 29 Wichita State; 30 Oklahoma	Dropped: 26 South Alabama; 27 Tennessee; 28 Kansas; 29 Ole Miss; 30 Washington	Dropped: 20 Alabama; 22 South Carolina; 28 North Carolina; 30 Texas Tech	Dropped: 23 Florida; 28 UNLV; 29 Western Carolina	Dropped: 22 Wake Forest; 28 South Alabama; 29 Lamar; 30 Wichita State	Dropped: 21 Arkansas; 25 North Carolina	Dropped: 23 Alabama; 24 Missouri; 26 Oklahoma State; 29 TCU	Dropped: 15 Clemson; 21 UC Riverside; 23 New Mexico State	Dropped: 26 Pepperdine; 28 Western Carolina	Dropped: 23 Rutgers; 27 Minnesota; 28 TCU	Dropped: 23 Tulane; 25 Arizona; 27 Clemson; 29 Southern	None	None	

The preseason poll ranked the top 40. Teams not listed above were: 31. Kent State 32. Stetson 33. Georgia 34. North Carolina 35. Texas Tech 36. East Carolina 37. Southern 38. FIU 39. Oklahoma State 40. Auburn

== NCBWA ==
	Preseason Jan 13	Week 1 Feb 3	Week 2 Feb 10	Week 3 Feb 17	Week 4 Feb 24	Week 5 Mar 3	Week 6 Mar 10	Week 7 Mar 17	Week 8 Mar 24	Week 9 Mar 31	Week 10 Apr 7	Week 11 Apr 14	Week 12 Apr 21	Week 13 Apr 28	Week 14 May 5	Week 15 May 12	Week 16 May 19	Week 17 May 26	Week 18 June 24	
1.	Texas	Texas (3–0)	Texas (6–1)	Texas (10–1)	Rice (8–1)	Rice (11–1)	Rice (15–1)	Rice (19–1)	Rice (24–1)	Rice (28–1)	Rice (32–1)	Rice (35–3)	Florida State (36–6)	Cal State Fullerton (38–8)	Florida State (40–8)	Florida State (44–8)	Florida State (47–8)	Rice (48–10)	Rice (58–12)	1.
2.	Rice	Rice (0–0)	Rice (0–0)	Rice (3–1)	Florida State (11–1)	Florida State (14–1)	Georgia Tech (14–0)	Arizona State (30–2)	Georgia Tech (20–2)	Florida State (28–5)	Florida State (31–5)	Florida State (33–6)	Cal State Fullerton (34–8)	Florida State (38–7)	Rice (40–7)	Rice (43–8)	Rice (46–9)	Florida State (50–10)	Stanford (51–18)	2.
3.	Georgia Tech	Georgia Tech (0–0)	Georgia Tech (0–0)	Georgia Tech (2–0)	Georgia Tech (6–0)	Georgia Tech (9–0)	Arizona State (28–1)	Georgia Tech (17–1)	Arizona State (32–4)	Cal State Fullerton (24–6)	Cal State Fullerton (27–7)	Cal State Fullerton (30–8)	Rice (37–6)	Rice (40–7)	Arizona State (43–9)	Arizona State (44–9)	Arizona State (47–11)	Arizona State (50–12)	Cal State Fullerton (50–16)	3.
4.	Southern California	Southern California (0–0)	Cal State Fullerton (6–0)	Florida State (8–1)	Arizona State (21–1)	Arizona State (24–1)	Florida State (19–2)	Florida State (24–2)	Florida State (25–4)	Arizona State (34–6)	Arizona State (34–7)	Arizona State (38–7)	Stanford (26–11)	Arizona State (42–9)	Long Beach State (32–14)	Stanford (35–14)	Stanford (38–15)	Stanford (41–15)	Texas (50–20)	4.
5.	Stanford	Florida State (3–0)	Florida State (5–1)	Cal State Fullerton (8–1)	Cal State Fullerton (11–1)	Cal State Fullerton (14–1)	Cal State Fullerton (16–3)	Cal State Fullerton (18–4)	Cal State Fullerton (21–5)	Mississippi State (22–3)	Stanford (20–10)	Stanford (23–10)	Georgia Tech (32–7)	LSU (30–13)	Stanford (31–14)	Cal State Fullerton (41–12)	Cal State Fullerton (43–13)	Cal State Fullerton (43–13)	Miami (FL) (45–17)	5.
6.	Florida State	Houston (0–0)	LSU (3–0)	Arizona State (17–1)	South Carolina (8–1)	South Carolina (9–2)	South Carolina (13–3)	Long Beach State (16–6)	Long Beach State (16–7)	Stanford (18–9)	Mississippi State (24–5)	Auburn (29–8)	Arizona State (39–9)	NC State (36–10)	Texas (37–14)	Long Beach State (36–14)	Nebraska (42–14)	Texas (43–17)	South Carolina (45–20)	6.
7.	Houston	Cal State Fullerton (3–0)	Arizona State (14–1)	Wake Forest (0–0)	Texas (12–3)	Baylor (12–3)	Stanford (14–7)	Stanford (14–7)	Baylor (21–6)	Auburn (24–6)	Georgia Tech (24–6)	Georgia Tech (28–6)	Auburn (31–10)	Texas (35–13)	Cal State Fullerton (38–11)	Texas (37–14)	Long Beach State (37–16)	Long Beach State (38–18)	Arizona State (54–14)	7.
8.	Cal State Fullerton	Arizona State (11–1)	Wake Forest (0–0)	Southern California (5–2)	Wake Forest (4–1)	Stanford (11–7)	Mississippi State (9–1)	Texas (18–7)	Auburn (22–5)	Miami (FL) (23–4)	Auburn (27–7)	NC State (30–8)	NC State (30–8)	Stanford (28–13)	NC State (38–12)	NC State (38–12)	Texas A&M (41–15)	Nebraska (44–16)	Florida State (54–13)	8.
9.	LSU	LSU (0–0)	Richmond (0–0)	Richmond (0–0)	Stanford (9–6)	Mississippi State (5–1)	Auburn (16–3)	Baylor (17–6)	Stanford (15–8)	Georgia Tech (21–5)	Nebraska (23–7)	Texas (29–11)	Nebraska (29–10)	Nebraska (33–11)	LSU (32–16)	LSU (35–17)	LSU (37–18)	LSU (40–19)	LSU (45–22–1)	9.
10.	Arizona State	Wake Forest (0–0)	Southern California (2–2)	Notre Dame (0–0)	Richmond (2–0)	Richmond (3–0)	Long Beach State (13–6)	South Carolina (15–5)	Mississippi State (17–3)	Long Beach State (18–9)	Miami (FL) (25–6)	Miami (FL) (27–)	Texas (31–13)	Florida Atlantic (37–10)	Georgia Tech (33–13)	Georgia Tech (37–13)	Texas (38–16)	Georgia Tech (44–16)	SW Missouri State (40–26)	10.
11.	Wake Forest	Richmond (0–0)	Notre Dame (0–0)	South Carolina (4–1)	Baylor (8–3)	Long Beach State (10–5)	Baylor (14–5)	Mississippi State (13–2)	Richmond (18–2)	Richmond (20–4)	NC State (27–7)	Mississippi State (25–7)	Long Beach State (26–12)	Long Beach State (29–13)	Nebraska (36–13)	Nebraska (39–13)	NC State (39–14)	Texas A&M (43–17)	Long Beach State (41–20)	11.
12.	Richmond	Notre Dame (0–0)	Miami (FL) (3–1)	Miami (FL) (4–2)	Miami (FL) (7–2)	Wake Forest (5–3)	Richmond (10–1)	Auburn (18–5)	Miami (FL) (19–4)	Baylor (22–9)	Clemson (23–7)	Long Beach State (23–12)	Mississippi State (28–9)	Georgia Tech (32–11)	Florida Atlantic (39–11)	Texas A&M (39–13)	Georgia Tech (39–15)	NC State (41–16)	Baylor (45–23)	12.
13.	Notre Dame	Baylor (0–0)	South Carolina (2–1)	Long Beach State (6–3)	Long Beach State (8–4)	Florida (11–1)	Miami (FL) (12–3)	Richmond (13–2)	Texas (19–10)	Florida (22–6)	Long Beach State (20–11)	LSU (24–11)	Florida Atlantic (34–10)	Auburn (32–13)	Clemson (32–13)	Florida Atlantic (42–11)	Florida Atlantic (44–12)	Florida Atlantic (46–14)	NC State (45–18)	13.
14.	Baylor	South Carolina (0–0)	Long Beach State (3–3)	Mississippi State (0–0)	Mississippi State (2–1)	Texas (13–5)	Nebraska (9–2)	Miami (FL) (15–4)	Clemson (16–3)	Texas (21–1)	Texas (25–11)	Notre Dame (25–6)	LSU (26–13)	Notre Dame (34–9)	Richmond (39–8)	Richmond (41–11)	Auburn (38–17)	Baylor (41–21)	Georgia Tech (44–18)	14.
15.	South Carolina	Stanford (2–3)	Stanford (3–5)	Stanford (6–5)	Florida (8–1)	Miami (FL) (9–3)	Wake Forest (9–4)	Alabama (16–3)	LSU (16–7)	LSU (18–9)	Notre Dame (20–6)	Nebraska (25–9)	Notre Dame (29–8)	Texas A&M (35–13)	Texas A&M (35–13)	Notre Dame (37–14)	Richmond (44–13)	Auburn (40–19)	Nebraska (47–18)	15.
16.	Long Beach State	Miami (FL) (0–0)	Nebraska (0–0)	Nebraska (2–1)	Notre Dame (2–2)	Nebraska (7–2)	Texas (15–6)	Arkansas (16–2)	Florida (19–6)	Nebraska (19–6)	LSU (21–10)	Clemson (25–9)	Richmond (31–7)	Richmond (33–8)	Notre Dame (36–12)	Miami (FL) (33–13)	Miami (FL) (37–13)	Southern Miss (45–14)	Texas A&M (45–19)	16.
17.	Miami (FL)	Nebraska (0–0)	South Alabama (0–0)	Florida (4–1)	North Carolina (4–0)	Tennessee (9–1)	Tulane (13–4)	Clemson (11–3)	Alabama (18–5)	NC State (23–7)	Richmond (23–6)	Richmond (27–6)	Texas A&M (32–12)	Clemson (31–13)	Miami (FL) (32–11)	Southern Miss (39–13)	Southern Miss (41–14)	Richmond (46–13)	Ohio State (44–21)	17.
18.	Nebraska	South Alabama (0–0)	Mississippi State (0–0)	Baylor (4–3)	Clemson (1–2)	Kansas (13–4)	Kansas (16–4)	Kansas (18–6)	Nebraska (14–6)	Clemson (19–6)	Florida Atlantic (30–8)	Florida Atlantic (32–9)	Miami (FL) (28–9)	UNLV (35–12)	Auburn (34–14)	Auburn (35–16)	South Carolina (38–18)	Miami (FL) (39–14)	Auburn (42–21)	18.
19.	South Alabama	Mississippi State (0–0)	Houston (1–2)	Clemson (0–0)	Texas A&M (7–2)	Auburn (12–3)	Florida (13–3)	Wake Forest (13–5)	Arizona (21–8)	Alabama (20–7)	Oklahoma State (21–9)	Baylor (25–14)	Arkansas (30–8)	Miami (FL) (29–11)	Mississippi State (33–13)	South Carolina (35–17)	Notre Dame (40–15)	Notre Dame (43–16)	Southern Miss (47–16)	19.
20.	Mississippi State	Long Beach State (1–2)	Clemson (0–0)	North Carolina (0–0)	Auburn (8–3)	Clemson (3–3)	Clemson (8–3)	Texas A&M (19–5)	NC State (21–5)	Notre Dame (16–6)	Baylor (23–12)	Texas A&M (29–11)	UNLV (32–11)	Southern Miss (34–11)	UNLV (37–13)	Mississippi State (34–15)	Mississippi State (38–16)	South Carolina (39–20)	Houston (37–30)	20.
21.	Stetson	Stetson (0–0)	North Carolina (0–0)	Texas A&M (3–1)	Southern California (5–6)	Tulane (9–4)	LSU (11–6)	Florida (15–5)	South Carolina (15–5)	Florida Atlantic (27–7)	Florida (23–9)	Arkansas (27–7)	Southern Miss (30–10)	Mississippi State (30–12)	Arizona (33–17)	Arizona (33–17)	Arizona (35–17)	Mississippi State (40–18)	Richmond (48–15)	21.
22.	Clemson	Clemson (0–0)	Stetson (1–1)	FIU (10–1)	Ohio State (0–0)	Arizona (11–5)	UNC Greensboro (14–1)	Nebraska (11–4)	Florida Atlantic (23–7)	Arkansas (22–5)	Texas A&M (26–10)	Oklahoma State (23–11)	Tulane (29–12)	Alabama (31–13)	Southern Miss (36–13)	Tulane (37–15)	Baylor (37–19)	Tulane (43–17)	Florida Atlantic (47–16)	22.
23.	North Carolina	North Carolina (0–0)	UCF (0–0)	Ohio State (0–0)	Tulane (8–1)	Notre Dame (3–4)	Notre Dame (4–4)	Notre Dame (9–5)	Southern Miss (17–6)	Texas A&M (23–9)	Wake Forest (20–10)	Southern Miss (26–10)	North Carolina (30–11)	Tulane (32–13)	Tulane (36–13)	Baylor (35–17)	Tulane (40–16)	UNLV (45–15)	Lamar (40–18)	23.
24.	UCF	UCF (0–0)	Ohio State (0–0)	Auburn (6–1)	Kansas (11–3)	Wichita State (9–1)	Texas A&M (15–4)	LSU (13–7)	Notre Dame (9–6)	Southern Miss (20–8)	Missouri (23–8)	Wake Forest (21–120	Missouri (27–12)	Baylor (30–17)	Baylor (34–17)	UNLV (39–14)	UNLV (41–15)	Lamar (37–16)	Mississippi State (42–20)	24.
25.	Ohio State	Ohio State (0–0)	Florida Atlantic (5–0)	Tulane (5–1)	Tennessee (8–0)	Texas A&M (10–4)	Arizona (12–7)	Arizona (17–7)	Tulane (19–6)	Wake Forest (19–7)	Southern Miss (23–9)	Missouri (25–10)	Arizona (28–14)	Lamar (31–12)	UC Riverside (36–12)	Lamar (35–14)	Lamar (37–14)	Washington (40–16)	Tulane (44–19)	25.
26.	James Madison	Florida Atlantic (3–0)	Tulane (3–0)	Tennessee (6–0)	Nebraska (4–2)	UNC Greensboro (10–0)	Arkansas (11–1)	Southern Miss (15–4)	South Alabama (15–7)	Arizona (22–10)	Arkansas (25–6)	Arizona (26–12)	Baylor (27–12)	Arizona (30–16)	Lamar (33–12)	South Alabama (36–14)	South Alabama (39–15)	South Alabama (40–17)	UNLV (47–17)	26.
27.	SW Missouri State	James Madison (0–0)	James Madison (0–0)	SW Missouri State (0–0)	Wichita State (3–0)	North Carolina (5–2)	Alabama (12–3)	Oklahoma (11–5)	Texas Tech (19–9)	South Carolina (19–9)	UNLV (26–9)	UNLV (28–11)	Lamar (27–12)	Missouri (28–15)	New Mexico State (38–11)	Minnesota (34–17)	Minnesota (37–18)	UC Riverside (40–15)	Southern (44–7)	27.
28.	Virginia Tech	SW Missouri State (0–0)	SW Missouri State (0–0)	Kansas (9–3)	LSU (6–4)	Arkansas (8–0)	Wichita State (12–3)	Tulane (15–6)	Arkansas (18–5)	Texas Tech (20–11)	Alabama (21–10)	Lamar (25–10)	Oklahoma State (26–13)	New Mexico State (35–11)	Minnesota (31–15)	TCU (33–19)	TCU (35–20)	Southern (46–5)	Washington (42–18)	28.
29.	Florida Atlantic	Virginia Tech (0–0)	Virginia Tech (0–0)	Houston (2–4)	SW Missouri State (3–1)	Oklahoma (5–2)	Oklahoma (8–3)	Wichita State (13–5)	Wake Forest (15–7)	UNLV (22–9)	Virginia Tech (20–8)	Virginia Tech (22–9)	Minnesota (23–13)	Minnesota (27–14)	TCU (31–18)	Pepperdine (34–18)	UC Riverside (40–15)	TCU (35–22)	Notre Dame (45–18)	29.
30.	East Carolina	FIU (5–0)	FIU (0–0)	Wichita State (3–0)	Oklahoma (3–1)	Ohio State (1–2)	South Florida (11–4)	Ohio State (7–3)	Washington (16–7)	Oklahoma State (17–9)	Western Carolina (23–10)	South Alabama (25–10)	New Mexico State (31–11)	TCU (29–16)	Western Carolina (34–14)	UC Riverside (37–15)	Rutgers (33–18)	VCU (41–11)	South Alabama (42–19)	30.
31.	Auburn	East Carolina (0–0)	East Carolina (0–0)	East Carolina (3–0)	South Florida (6–2)	UAB (13–0)	Ohio State (3–3)	UAB (17–3)	Texas A&M (20–8)	UAB (21–6)	Arizona (24–11)	Alabama (25–11)	TCU (26–15)	West Virginia (28–12)	Rutgers (26–15)	Rutgers (30–16)	West Virginia (35–17)	Ohio State (41–19)	UC Riverside (41–17)	31.
32.	VCU	Auburn (0–0)	Auburn (0–0)	LSU (4–3)	Texas Tech (9–4)	Southern California (7–8)	Texas Tech (15–6)	Texas Tech (17–8)	Kansas (20–9)	North Carolina (19–9)	East Carolina (21–11)	Tulane (26–11)	South Carolina (25–15)	Pepperdine (28–16)	West Virginia (31–14)	Western Carolina (35–15)	Western Carolina (37–18)	Alabama (37–22)	TCU (35–22)	32.
33.	Wichita State	VCU (0–0)	Wichita State (0–0)	Texas Tech (8–2)	UNC Greensboro (8–0)	Virginia Tech (3–1)	Southern Miss (11–4)	Florida Atlantic (19–6)	Northwestern State (17–8)	Tulane (20–9)	South Carolina (20–12)	Florida (25–11)	Pepperdine (26–15)	Oklahoma State (28–15)	Pepperdine (31–17)	New Mexico State (38–14)	VCU (41–11)	Clemson (38–20)	Wichita State (49–27)	33.
34.	Southern	Wichita State (0–0)	Texas Tech (6–1)	Oklahoma (2–1)	Virginia Tech (1–1)	LSU (7–6)	Florida Atlantic (16–5)	NC State (18–4)	Illinois (10–2)	VCU (22–7)	South Alabama (21–9)	Wichita State (27–12)	Alabama (27–13)	Arkansas (30–12); Western Carolina (29–14)	Missouri (31–17)	VCU (38–11)	Southern (46–5)	Arizona (35–21)	VCU (46–13)	34.
35.	Kent State	Southern (0–0)	Southern (0–0)	Southern (1–1)	TCU (8–4)	Southern Miss (8–2)	Northwestern State (12–6)	Coastal Carolina (18–4)	Oklahoma State (14–8)	UC Riverside (22–6)	Wichita State (22–11)	East Carolina (23–12–1)	Clemson (27–12)	Florida (31–13–1)	Oklahoma State (28–15)	Missouri (32–17)	New Mexico State (39–16)	New Mexico State (42–16)	Alabama (38–24)	35.
	Preseason Jan 13	Week 1 Feb 3	Week 2 Feb 10	Week 3 Feb 17	Week 4 Feb 24	Week 5 Mar 3	Week 6 Mar 10	Week 7 Mar 17	Week 8 Mar 24	Week 9 Mar 31	Week 10 Apr 7	Week 11 Apr 14	Week 12 Apr 21	Week 13 Apr 28	Week 14 May 5	Week 15 May 12	Week 16 May 19	Week 17 May 26	Week 18 June 24	
		Dropped: 35 Kent State	Dropped: 13 Baylor; 33 VCU	Dropped: 17 South Alabama; 22 Stetson; 23 UCF; 25 Florida Atlantic; 27 James Madison; 29 Virginia Tech	Dropped: 22 FIU; 29 Houston; 31 East Carolina; 35 Southern	Dropped: 29 SW Missouri State; 31 South Florida; 32 Texas Tech; 30 TCU	Dropped: 17 Tennessee; 27 North Carolina; 31 UAB; 32 Southern California; 33 Virginia Tech	Dropped: 22 UNC Greensboro; 30 South Florida; 35 Northwestern State	Dropped: 27 Oklahoma; 29 Wichita State; 30 Ohio State; 31 UAB; 35 Coastal Carolina	Dropped: 26 South Alabama; 30 Washington; 32 Kansas; 33 Northwestern State; 34 Illinois	Dropped: 28 Texas Tech; 31 UAB; 32 North Carolina; 33 Tulane; 34 VCU; 35 UC Riverside	Dropped: 30 Western Carolina; 33 South Carolina	Dropped: 29 Virginia Tech; 30 South Alabama; 33 Florida; 34 Wichita State; 35 East Carolina	Dropped: 23 North Carolina; 32 South Carolina	Dropped: 22 Alabama; 34 Arkansas; 35 Florida	Dropped: 13 Clemson; 32 West Virginia; 35 Oklahoma State	Dropped: 29 Pepperdine; 35 Missouri	Dropped: 27 Minnesota; 30 Rutgers; 31 West Virginia; 32 Western Carolina	Dropped: 33 Clemson; 34 Arizona; 35 New Mexico State	
