= 2003 Stanford Cardinal baseball team =

American college baseball season

2003 Stanford Cardinal baseball

Palo Alto Regional champion Palo Alto Super Regional champion

College World Series, 2nd
- Conference: Pacific-10 Conference

Ranking
- Coaches: No. 2
- CB: No. 2
- Record: 51–18 (18–6 Pac-10)
- Head coach: Mark Marquess (27th season)
- Home stadium: Sunken Diamond

2003 Pacific-10 Conference baseball standings
	Conf.				Overall
Team	W		L	PCT	W		L	PCT
No. 2 Stanford ‍†‍‍^{y}	18	–	6	.750	51	–	18	.739
No. 10 Arizona State ‍‍‍^{y}	16	–	8	.667	54	–	14	.794
No. 27 Washington ‍‍‍^{y}	15	–	9	.625	42	–	48	.467
Arizona ‍‍‍^{y}	13	–	11	.542	35	–	23	.603
Southern California ‍‍‍	11	–	13	.458	28	–	28	.500
UCLA ‍‍‍	11	–	13	.458	28	–	31	.475
California ‍‍‍	10	–	14	.417	28	–	27	.509
Oregon State ‍‍‍	7	–	17	.292	25	–	28	.472
Washington State ‍‍‍	7	–	17	.292	19	–	37	.339
† – Conference champion y – Invited to the NCAA tournament As of June 30, 2003; Rankings from Collegiate Baseball

The 2003 Stanford Cardinal baseball team represented Stanford University in the 2003 NCAA Division I baseball season. The Cardinal played their home games at Sunken Diamond in Palo Alto, California. The team was coached by Mark Marquess in his twenty-seventh season as head coach at Stanford.

The Cardinal reached the College World Series, finishing as the runner up to Rice.

== Roster ==
2003 Stanford Cardinal roster
Pitchers: 17 - John Hudgins; 19 - David O'Hagan; 20 - Ryan McCally; 21 - Mark Romanczuk; 27 - Tim Cunningham; 28 - Kodiak Quick; 33 - Jonny Dyer; 36 - Matt Manship; 38 - Drew Ehrlich	Infielders: 1 - Johnny Ash; 3 - Brian Hall; 6 - Tobin Swope; 8 - Chris Lewis; Catchers: 12 - Ryan Garko; 15 - Donny Lucy	Outfielders: 4 - Jed Lowrie; 5 - Sam Fuld; 7 - Danny Putnam; 11 - Chris Carter; 24 - Carlos Quentin; 25 - John Mayberry Jr.

== Schedule ==
Legend
Stanford win
Stanford loss

2003 Stanford Cardinal baseball game log
Regular season

January/February
Date	Opponent	Rank	Site/stadium	Score	Win	Loss	Save	Attendance	Overall record	Pac-10 record
Jan 25	at Santa Clara*	No. 9	Buck Shaw Stadium • Santa Clara, CA	W 7–2	Hudgins (1–0)	Diefenderfer (0–1)	McCally (1)	1,390	1–0	
Jan 26	Santa Clara*	No. 9	Sunken Diamond • Stanford, CA	W 5–0	Cunningham (1–0)	Travis (0–1)	Manship (1)	1,636	2–0	
Jan 31	at Cal State Fullerton*	No. 9	Goodwin Field • Fullerton, CA	L 3–7	Tucker (0–1)	Manship (0–1)	None	3,131	2–1	
Feb 1	at Cal State Fullerton*	No. 9	Goodwin Field • Fullerton, CA	L 2–10	Schreppel (1–0)	Cunningham (1–1)	None	2,825	2–2	
Feb 2	at Cal State Fullerton*	No. 9	Goodwin Field • Fullerton, CA	L 2–8	Miller (1–0)	McCally (0–1)	None	2,238	2–3	
Feb 7	Florida State*	No. 12	Sunken Diamond • Stanford, CA	W 2–1^{12}	Romanczuk (1–0)	James (0–1)	None	1,690	3–3	
Feb 8	Florida State*	No. 12	Sunken Diamond • Stanford, CA	L 3–4	M. Lynch (2–0)	Cunningham (1–2)	Hodges (2)	2,119	3–4	
Feb 9	Florida State*	No. 12	Sunken Diamond • Stanford, CA	L 8–10^{12}	Hodges (1–0)	O'Hagan (0–1)	None	2,396	3–5	
Feb 14	Fresno State*	No. 12	Sunken Diamond • Stanford, CA	W 4–1	Hudgins (2–0)	Glynn (0–2)	Romanczuk (1)	1,644	4–5	
Feb 15	Fresno State*	No. 12	Sunken Diamond • Stanford, CA	W 5–2	O'Hagan (1–1)	Smith (0–1)	Romaczuk (2)	1,832	5–5	
Feb 16	Fresno State*	No. 12	Sunken Diamond • Stanford, CA	W 7–2	McCally (1–1)	Garza (1–2)	None	2,067	6–5	
Feb 17	Nevada*	No. 11	Sunken Diamond • Stanford, CA	W 5–4	Romanczuk (2–0)	Basch (0–1)	None	1,845	7–5	
Feb 22	at Texas*	No. 11	Disch–Falk Field • Austin, TX	W 11–7	Hudgins (3–0)	Muegge (3–1)	None	6,799	8–5	
Feb 22	at Texas*	No. 11	Disch–Falk Field • Austin, TX	W 8–7	Romaczuk (3–0)	Simmons (2–1)	Manship (2)	6,799	9–5	
Feb 23	at Texas*	No. 11	Disch–Falk Field • Austin, TX	L 1–7	Smith (2–0)	Dyer (0–1)	None	6,017	9–6	
Feb 28	Southern California*	No. 7	Sunken Diamond • Stanford, CA	L 4–13	Bn Bannister (3–1)	Hudgins (3–1)	None	1,901	9–7	

March
Date	Opponent	Rank	Site/stadium	Score	Win	Loss	Save	Attendance	Overall record	Pac-10 record
Mar 1	Southern California*	No. 7	Sunken Diamond • Stanford, CA	W 10–6	McCally (2–1)	Dizard (1–1)	O'Hagan (1)	2,292	10–7	
Mar 2	Southern California*	No. 7	Sunken Diamond • Stanford, CA	W 18–4	Romanczuk (4–0)	Paschal (0–3)	Manship (3)	2,780	11–7	
Mar 7	California*	No. 8	Sunken Diamond • Stanford, CA	W 11–2	Hudgins (4–1)	Brown (1–2)	None	2,280	12–7	
Mar 8	California*	No. 8	Sunken Diamond • Stanford, CA	W 9–4	McCally (3–1)	Montalbo (2–1)	Quick (1)	2,539	13–7	
Mar 9	California*	No. 8	Sunken Diamond • Stanford, CA	W 11–2	Romanczuk (5–0)	Crist (0–1)	O'Hagan (2)	2,850	14–7	
Mar 22	at Arizona State	No. 7	Packard Stadium • Tempe, AZ	L 6–7	Schroyer (4–0)	Manship (0–2)	None	4,019	14–8	0–1
Mar 23	at Arizona State	No. 7	Packard Stadium • Tempe, AZ	W 9–8	O'Hagan (2–1)	Schroyer (4–1)	Quick (2)	3,483	15–8	1–1
Mar 24	at Arizona State	No. 6	Packard Stadium • Tempe, AZ	W 4–2	Romanczuk (6–0)	Sopko (3–2)	None	3,397	16–8	2–1
Mar 28	Washington	No. 6	Sunken Diamond • Stanford, CA	L 3–5	White (4–3)	Hudgins (4–2)	Carter (5)	1,704	16–9	2–2
Mar 29	Washington	No. 6	Sunken Diamond • Stanford, CA	W 10–6	O'Hagan (3–1)	Dowling (5–1)	Quick (3)	1,998	17–9	3–2
Mar 30	Washington	No. 6	Sunken Diamond • Stanford, CA	W 12–11	Quick (1–0)	Dowling (5–2)	None	2,113	18–9	4–2

April
Date	Opponent	Rank	Site/stadium	Score	Win	Loss	Save	Attendance	Overall record	Pac-10 record
Apr 1	San Francisco*	No. 4	Sunken Diamond • Stanford, CA	L 5–9	Annis (3–2)	Paganetti (0–1)	Tate (1)	1,552	18–10	
Apr 4	at Washington State	No. 4	Bailey–Brayton Field • Pullman, WA	W 6–1	Hudgins (5–2)	Banaszak (1–7)	None	703	19–10	5–2
Apr 5	at Washington State	No. 4	Bailey–Brayton Field • Pullman, WA	W 12–5	Manship (1–2)	Chamberlin (3–3)	None	739	20–10	6–2
Apr 7	at Washington State	No. 4	Bailey–Brayton Field • Pullman, WA	W 8–5^{11}	O'Hagan (4–1)	Kenyon (1–2)	None	119	21–10	7–2
Apr 8	at Santa Clara*	No. 4	Buck Shaw Stadium • Santa Clara, CA	W 17–8	Ehrlich (1–0)	Slorp (0–1)	None	502	22–10	
Apr 11	Sacramento State*	No. 4	Sunken Diamond • Stanford, CA	W 9–1	Hudgins (6–2)	S. Cuckovich (5–2)	None	1,654	23–10	
Apr 15	San Jose State*	No. 4	Sunken Diamond • Stanford, CA	W 4–2	Romanczuk (7–0)	Winck (1–2)	O'Hagan (3)	1,670	24–10	
Apr 17	Oregon State	No. 4	Sunken Diamond • Stanford, CA	W 5–2	Hudgins (7–2)	Rowe (3–4)	None	1,725	25–10	8–2
Apr 18	Oregon State	No. 4	Sunken Diamond • Stanford, CA	L 7–8	Pendley (1–2)	McCally (3–2)	None	1,786	25–11	8–3
Apr 19	Oregon State	No. 4	Sunken Diamond • Stanford, CA	W 10–0	Romaczuk (8–0)	Copeland (3–4)	None	2,236	26–11	9–3
Apr 22	at Sacramento State*	No. 3	John Smith Field • Sacramento, CA	W 5–1	Dyer (1–1)	Kinsey (5–4)	Manship (4)	207	27–11	
Apr 25	Arizona	No. 3	Sunken Diamond • Stanford, CA	L 3–4	Gardner (7–1)	Hudgins (7–3)	Meloan (2)	1,825	27–12	9–4
Apr 26	Arizona	No. 3	Sunken Diamond • Stanford, CA	W 10–9	Dyer (2–1)	Pemble (2–3)	Manship (5)	2,591	28–12	10–4
Apr 27	Arizona	No. 3	Sunken Diamond • Stanford, CA	L 6–11	Guyette (3–3)	Manship (1–3)	None	2,778	28–13	10–5
Apr 29	Santa Clara	No. 7	Sunken Diamond • Stanford, CA	L 0–2	Shapiro (1–1)	Cunningham (1–3)	Overholt (8)	1,520	28–14	

May
Date	Opponent	Rank	Site/stadium	Score	Win	Loss	Save	Attendance	Overall record	Pac-10 record
May 3	at Southern California	No. 7	Dedeaux Field • Los Angeles, CA	W 22–10	O'Hagan (5–1)	Rummonds (4–3)	None	429	29–14	11–5
May 4	at Southern California	No. 7	Dedeaux Field • Los Angeles, CA	W 8–3	Manship (2–3)	Paschal (3–5)	None	1,004	30–14	12–5
May 4	at Southern California	No. 7	Dedeaux Field • Los Angeles, CA	W 8–3	Romanczuk (9–0)	Bn Bannister (5–5)	None	1,004	31–14	13–5
May 6	at San Jose State*	No. 3	San Jose Municipal Stadium • San Jose, CA	W 3–0	Cunningham (2–2)	Amaya (3–4)	McCally (2)	442	32–14	
May 9	at California*	No. 3	Evans Diamond • Berkeley, CA	W 9–8	Quick (2–0)	Brown (3–7)	Manship (6)	510	33–14	14–5
May 10	at California*	No. 3	Evans Diamond • Berkeley, CA	W 6–4	McCally (4–2)	Brown (3–8)	Manship (7)	713	34–14	15–5
May 11	at California*	No. 3	Evans Diamond • Berkeley, CA	W 5–4	O'Hagan (6–1)	Ingram (2–3)	None	677	35–14	16–5
May 13	Saint Mary's*	No. 3	Sunken Diamond • Stanford, CA	W 10–1	Jecmen (1–0)	Bowden (7–7)	None	1,624	36–14	
May 16	UCLA	No. 3	Sunken Diamond • Stanford, CA	W 9–1	Hudgins (8–3)	Janssen (5–6)	None	2,498	37–14	17–5
May 17	UCLA	No. 3	Sunken Diamond • Stanford, CA	L 5–9^{12}	Cordeiro (1–2)	Manship (2–4)	None	2,913	37–15	17–6
May 18	UCLA	No. 3	Sunken Diamond • Stanford, CA	W 9–8^{10}	McCally (5–2)	Castillo (1–1)	None	3,338	38–15	18–6
May 23	Cal Poly*	No. 3	Sunken Diamond • Stanford, CA	W 9–4	Hudgins (9–3)	Kougl (1–9)	None	4,017	39–15	
May 24	Cal Poly*	No. 3	Sunken Diamond • Stanford, CA	W 12–0	Romanczuk (10–0)	Olson (5–3)	Manship (8)	2,488	40–15	
May 25	Cal Poly*	No. 3	Sunken Diamond • Stanford, CA	W 8–4	Cunningham (3–3)	McDaniel (4–6)	None	2,990	41–15	

Postseason

NCAA Palo Alto Regional
Date	Opponent	Rank	Site/stadium	Score	Win	Loss	Save	Attendance	Overall record	Regional Record
May 30	(4) UIC	No. 3 (1)	Sunken Diamond • Stanford, CA	W 9–2	McCally (6–2)	Gehring (8–5)	None	2,454	42–15	1–0
May 31	No. 30 (3) UC Riverside	No. 3 (1)	Sunken Diamond • Stanford, CA	W 13–6	Hudgins (10–3)	Shappi (11–3)	None	2,248	43–15	2–0
June 1	No. 17 (2) Richmond	No. 3 (1)	Sunken Diamond • Stanford, CA	W 19–6	Romaczuk (11–0)	Rice (5–3)	None	2,270	44–15	3–0

NCAA Palo Alto Super Regional
Date	Opponent	Rank	Site/stadium	Score	Win	Loss	Save	Attendance	Overall record	SR Record
June 6	No. 6 Long Beach State	No. 3 (6)	Sunken Diamond • Stanford, CA	W 5–1	Hudgins (11–3)	Alvarez (11–2)	None	3,561	45–15	1–0
June 7	No. 6 Long Beach State	No. 3 (6)	Sunken Diamond • Stanford, CA	W 4–2	Romanczuk (12–0)	Weaver (14–4)	Manship (9)	3,285	46–15	2–0

College World Series
Date	Opponent	Rank	Site/stadium	Score	Win	Loss	Save	Attendance	Overall record	CWS record
June 13	No. 7 South Carolina	No. 3 (6)	Johnny Rosenblatt Stadium • Omaha, NE	W 8–0	Hudgins (12–3)	Marchbanks (15–3)	None	15,789	47–15	1–0
June 14	No. 2 (7) Cal State Fullerton	No. 3 (6)	Johnny Rosenblatt Stadium • Omaha, NE	L 5–6	Littleton (7–3)	Romaczuk (12–1)	Cordero (8)	24,191	47–16	1–1
June 17	No. 7 South Carolina	No. 3 (6)	Johnny Rosenblatt Stadium • Omaha, NE	W 13–6	McCally (7–2)	Hernandez (5–5)	None	21,362	48–16	2–1
June 18	No. 2 (7) Cal State Fullerton	No. 3 (6)	Johnny Rosenblatt Stadium • Omaha, NE	W 5–3	Hudgins (13–3)	Littleton (7–4)	None	15,000	49–16	3–1
June 19	No. 2 (7) Cal State Fullerton	No. 3 (6)	Johnny Rosenblatt Stadium • Omaha, NE	W 7–5	O'Hagan (7–1)	Merrell (4–1)	None	16,085	50–16	4–1
June 21	No. 1 (5) Rice	No. 3 (6)	Johnny Rosenblatt Stadium • Omaha, NE	L 3–4^{10}	Aardsma (7–3)	McCally (7–3)	None	23,741	50–17	4–2
June 22	No. 1 (5) Rice	No. 3 (6)	Johnny Rosenblatt Stadium • Omaha, NE	W 8–3	Hudgins (14–3)	Townsend (11–2)	None	17,907	51–17	5–2
June 23	No. 1 (5) Rice	No. 3 (6)	Johnny Rosenblatt Stadium • Omaha, NE	L 2–14	Humber (11–3)	Romanczuk (12–2)	None	18,494	51–18	5–3

Rankings from Collegiate Baseball Newspaper. Tournament seeds in parentheses.
