= 2003 Texas Longhorns baseball team =

American college baseball season

2003 Texas Longhorns baseball

Big 12 tournament champions NCAA Austin Regional champions NCAA Tallahassee Super Regional champions

College World Series, 2–2
- Conference: Big 12 Conference

Ranking
- Coaches: No. 4
- CB: No. 4
- Record: 50–20 (19–8 Big 12)
- Head coach: Augie Garrido (7th year)
- Home stadium: Disch–Falk Field

2003 Big 12 Conference baseball standings
	Conf.				Overall
Team	W		L	PCT	W		L	PCT
No. 15 Nebraska ‍†‍‍^{y}	20	–	7	.741	47	–	18	.723
No. 17 Texas A&M ‍‍‍^{y}	19	–	8	.704	45	–	19	.703
No. 4 Texas ‍‍‡‍^{y}	19	–	8	.704	50	–	20	.714
Missouri ‍‍‍^{y}	15	–	11	.577	36	–	22	.621
No. 13 Baylor ‍‍‍^{y}	15	–	12	.556	45	–	23	.662
Oklahoma State ‍‍‍	14	–	13	.519	34	–	23	.596
Oklahoma ‍‍‍	10	–	17	.370	23	–	31	.426
Kansas ‍‍‍	9	–	18	.333	35	–	28	.556
Texas Tech ‍‍‍	8	–	18	.308	30	–	25	.545
Kansas State ‍‍‍	5	–	22	.185	15	–	37	.288
† – Conference champion ‡ – Tournament champion y – Invited to the NCAA tournament As of June 30, 2003; Rankings from Collegiate Baseball

The 2003 Texas Longhorns baseball team represented the University of Texas at Austin in the 2003 NCAA Division I baseball season. The Longhorns played their home games at Disch–Falk Field. The team was coached by Augie Garrido in his seventh season at Texas.

The Longhorns reached the College World Series, where they recorded a pair of wins against Miami (FL) and a pair of losses against eventual champion Rice.

== Personnel ==
=== Roster ===
2003 Texas Longhorns roster
Pitchers: 10 - Sam LeCure; 17 - J. P. Howell; 25 - Huston Street; 26 - Brantley Jordan; 30 - Justin Simmons; 41 - Geno Espineli; 44 - J. B. Cox	Catchers: 8 - Curtis Thigpen; 31 - Taylor Teagarden; Infielders: 1 - Tim Moss; 2 - Seth Johnston; 14 - Mike Hollimon; 24 - Omar Quintanilla; Outfielders: 5 - Ryan Russ; 11 - Eric Sultemeier; 23 - Dustin Majewski	Unknown: 6 - Joe Ferin; 7 - Danny Muegge; 9 - Jesen Merle; 12 - Stephen Ripper; 13 - Brian Esquivel; 28 - Zach Gallencamp; 32 - Josh Smith; 34 - Kevin Frizzell; 35 - Pack Landfair; 42 - Scott Dodge; 45 - Ruben Gonzalez; 46 - Buck Cody; 48 - J. D. Reininger

=== Coaches ===
2003 Texas Longhorns baseball coaching staff
- Augie Garrido – Head coach – 7th year
- Tommy Harmon – Assistant coach – 14th year
- Frank Anderson – Assistant coach – 4th year

== Schedule and results ==
Legend
Texas win
Texas loss
Tie
Rankings from Collegiate Baseball, (Tournament seeds in parentheses)

2003 Texas Longhorns baseball game log (50–20)
Regular season (38–16)

January/February (12–4)
Date	Opponent	Rank	Site/stadium	Score	Overall record	Big 12 Record
Jan 31	at San Diego*	No. 1	John Cunningham Stadium • San Diego, CA	W 9–7	1–0	–
Feb 1	at San Diego*	No. 1	John Cunningham Stadium • San Diego, CA	W 17–4	2–0	–
Feb 2	at San Diego*	No. 1	John Cunningham Stadium • San Diego, CA	W 7–2	3–0	–
Feb 5	Texas A&M–Corpus Christi*	No. 1	Disch–Falk Field • Austin, TX	L 0–5	3–1	–
Feb 9	Texas–Arlington*	No. 1	Disch–Falk Field • Austin, TX	W 8–2	4–1	–
Feb 9	Texas–Arlington*	No. 1	Disch–Falk Field • Austin, TX	W 11–3	5–1	–
Feb 10	Texas–Arlington*	No. 1	Disch–Falk Field • Austin, TX	W 8–6	6–1	–
Feb 11	Southwest Texas State*	No. 1	Disch–Falk Field • Austin, TX	W 13–7	7–1	–
Feb 15	Sam Houston State*	No. 1	Disch–Falk Field • Austin, TX	W 17–3	8–1	–
Feb 16	Sam Houston State*	No. 1	Disch–Falk Field • Austin, TX	W 8–2	9–1	–
Feb 16	Sam Houston State*	No. 1	Disch–Falk Field • Austin, TX	W 1–0	10–1	–
Feb 18	UTSA*	No. 1	Disch–Falk Field • Austin, TX	W 14–1	11–1	–
Feb 22	No. 11 Stanford*	No. 1	Disch–Falk Field • Austin, TX	L 7–11	11–2	–
Feb 22	No. 11 Stanford*	No. 1	Disch–Falk Field • Austin, TX	L 7–8	11–3	–
Feb 23	No. 11 Stanford*	No. 1	Disch–Falk Field • Austin, TX	W 7–1	12–3	–
Feb 28	vs UCLA*	No. 8	Goodwin Field • Fullerton, CA	L 2–13	12–4	–

March (9–7)
Date	Opponent	Rank	Site/stadium	Score	Overall record	Big 12 Record
Mar 1	at No. 2 Cal State Fullerton*	No. 8	Goodwin Field • Fullerton, CA	L 4–14	12–5	–
Mar 2	vs. No. 22 Tulane*	No. 8	Goodwin Field • Fullerton, CA	W 6–1	13–5	–
Mar 7	No. 21 Arizona*	No. 11	Disch–Falk Field • Austin, TX	L 1–5	13–6	–
Mar 8	No. 21 Arizona*	No. 11	Disch–Falk Field • Austin, TX	W 3–2	14–6	–
Mar 9	No. 21 Arizona*	No. 11	Disch–Falk Field • Austin, TX	W 4–1	15–6	–
Mar 11	at No. 4 Rice*	No. 11	Reckling Park • Houston, TX	L 1–2^{10}	15–7	–
Mar 14	Missouri	No. 11	Disch–Falk Field • Austin, TX	W 4–1	16–7	1–0
Mar 15	Missouri	No. 11	Disch–Falk Field • Austin, TX	W 16–7	17–7	2–0
Mar 16	Missouri	No. 11	Disch–Falk Field • Austin, TX	W 6–3	18–7	3–0
Mar 18	Southwest Texas State*	No. 10	Disch–Falk Field • Austin, TX	L 1–3	18–8	–
Mar 22	at Oklahoma State	No. 10	Allie P. Reynolds Stadium • Stillwater, OK	L 3–4	18–9	3–1
Mar 23	at Oklahoma State	No. 10	Allie P. Reynolds Stadium • Stillwater, OK	W 15–5	19–9	4–1
Mar 24	at Oklahoma State	No. 15	Allie P. Reynolds Stadium • Stillwater, OK	L 5–9	19–10	4–2
Mar 28	No. 25 Texas Tech	No. 15	Disch–Falk Field • Austin, TX	W 5–4^{12}	20–10	5–2
Mar 29	No. 25 Texas Tech	No. 15	Disch–Falk Field • Austin, TX	W 11–5	21–10	6–2
Mar 30	No. 25 Texas Tech	No. 15	Disch–Falk Field • Austin, TX	L 2–5	21–11	6–3

April (14–2)
Date	Opponent	Rank	Site/stadium	Score	Overall record	Big 12 Record
Apr 1	Texas A&M–Corpus Christi*	No. 19	Disch–Falk Field • Austin, TX	W 7–6	22–11	–
Apr 4	No. 16 Baylor	No. 19	Disch–Falk Field • Austin, TX	W 11–5	23–11	7–3
Apr 5	at No. 16 Baylor	No. 19	Baylor Ballpark • Waco, TX	W 13–7	24–11	8–3
Apr 6	at No. 16 Baylor	No. 19	Baylor Ballpark • Waco, TX	W 11–3	25–11	9–3
Apr 8	Texas–Pan American*	No. 15	Disch–Falk Field • Austin, TX	W 7–3	26–11	–
Apr 11	Oklahoma	No. 15	Disch–Falk Field • Austin, TX	W 8–3	27–11	10–3
Apr 12	Oklahoma	No. 15	Disch–Falk Field • Austin, TX	W 10–2	28–11	11–3
Apr 13	Oklahoma	No. 15	Disch–Falk Field • Austin, TX	W 5–4^{10}	29–11	12–3
Apr 15	UTSA*	No. 10	Disch–Falk Field • Austin, TX	W 14–2	30–11	–
Apr 18	at No. 16 Nebraska	No. 10	Haymarket Park • Lincoln, NE	L 2–3	30–12	12–4
Apr 19	at No. 16 Nebraska	No. 10	Haymarket Park • Lincoln, NE	L 4–6	30–13	12–5
Apr 20	at No. 16 Nebraska	No. 10	Johnny Rosenblatt Stadium • Omaha, NE	W 10–4	31–13	13–5
Apr 22	Texas–Pan American*	No. 11	Disch–Falk Field • Austin, TX	W 6–5	32–13	–
Apr 25	Kansas State	No. 11	Disch–Falk Field • Austin, TX	W 12–1	33–13	14–5
Apr 26	Kansas State	No. 11	Disch–Falk Field • Austin, TX	W 3–1	34–13	15–5
Apr 27	Kansas State	No. 11	Disch–Falk Field • Austin, TX	W 12–1	35–13	16–5

May (3–3)
Date	Opponent	Rank	Site/stadium	Score	Overall record	Big 12 Record
May 2	at Kansas	No. 8	Hoglund Ballpark • Lawrence, KS	L 1–10	35–14	16–6
May 3	at Kansas	No. 8	Hoglund Ballpark • Lawrence, KS	W 5–1	36–14	17–6
May 4	at Kansas	No. 8	Hoglund Ballpark • Lawrence, KS	W 5–3^{11}	37–14	18–6
May 16	at No. 12 Texas A&M	No. 7	Olsen Field at Blue Bell Park • College Station, TX	L 4–6	37–15	18–7
May 17	No. 12 Texas A&M	No. 7	Disch–Falk Field • Austin, TX	W 3–0	38–15	19–7
May 18	No. 12 Texas A&M	No. 7	Disch–Falk Field • Austin, TX	L 1–4	38–16	19–8

Postseason (12–4)

Big 12 Tournament (5–1)
Date	Opponent	Seed/Rank	Site/stadium	Score	Overall record	B12T Record
May 21	(6) Oklahoma State	(3) No. 10	SBC Bricktown Ballpark • Oklahoma City, OK	W 10–7	39–16	1–0
May 22	(2) No. 9 Texas A&M	(3) No. 10	SBC Bricktown Ballpark • Oklahoma City, OK	L 2–3	39–17	1–1
May 23	(7) Oklahoma	No. 10 (3)	SBC Bricktown Ballpark • Oklahoma City, OK	W 5–4	40–17	2–1
May 24	(2) No. 9 Texas A&M	(3) No. 10	SBC Bricktown Ballpark • Oklahoma City, OK	W 9–4	41–17	3–1
May 24	(2) No. 9 Texas A&M	(3) No. 10	SBC Bricktown Ballpark • Oklahoma City, OK	W 13–4	42–17	4–1
May 25	(5) No. 22 Baylor	(3) No. 10	SBC Bricktown Ballpark • Oklahoma City, OK	W 10–8	43–17	5–1

NCAA Austin Regional (3–1)
Date	Opponent	Seed/Rank	Site/stadium	Score	Overall record	NCAAT record
May 30	(4) Bucknell	(1) No. 8	Disch–Falk Field • Austin, TX	W 7–0	44–17	1–0
May 31	(3) No. 22 Lamar	(1) No. 8	Disch–Falk Field • Austin, TX	w 7–3	45–17	2–0
June 1	(3) No. 22 Lamar	(1) No. 8	Disch–Falk Field • Austin, TX	L 2–6	45–18	2–1
June 1	(3) No. 22 Lamar	(1) No. 8	Disch–Falk Field • Austin, TX	W 6–3	46–18	3–1

NCAA Tallahassee Super Regional (2–0)
Date	Opponent	Rank	Site/stadium	Score	Overall record	SR Record
June 8	(1) No. 2 Florida State	No. 8	Mike Martin Field at Dick Howser Stadium • Tallahassee, FL	W 8–3	47–18	1–0
June 9	(1) No. 2 Florida State	No. 8	Dick Howser Stadium • Tallahassee, FL	W 6–5	48–18	2–0

College World Series (2–2)
Date	Opponent	Seed/Rank	Site/stadium	Score	Overall record	CWS record
June 14	(8) No. 6 Miami (FL)	No. 5	Johnny Rosenblatt Stadium • Omaha, NE	W 13–2	49–18	1–0
June 16	(5) No. 1 Rice	No. 5	Johnny Rosenblatt Stadium • Omaha, NE	L 2–12	49–19	1–1
June 17	(8) No. 6 Miami (FL)	No. 5	Johnny Rosenblatt Stadium • Omaha, NE	W 5–1	50–19	2–1
June 18	(5) No. 1 Rice	No. 5	Johnny Rosenblatt Stadium • Omaha, NE	L 4–5	50–20	2–2
