= 2003 Cal State Fullerton Titans baseball team =

American college baseball season

2003 Cal State Fullerton Titans baseball

NCAA Fullerton Super Regional champions NCAA Fullerton Regional champions

College World Series, 2–2
- Conference: Big West Conference
- Record: 50–16 (15–6 Big West)
- Head coach: George Horton (7th year)
- Home stadium: Goodwin Field

2003 Big West Conference baseball standings
	Conf.				Overall
Team	W		L	PCT	W		L	PCT
No. 11 Long Beach State ‍†‍‍^{y}	16	–	5	.762	41	–	18	.695
No. 3 Cal State Fullerton ‍‍‍^{y}	15	–	6	.714	50	–	16	.758
No. 30 UC Riverside ‍‍‍^{y}	14	–	7	.667	41	–	17	.707
Cal Poly ‍‍‍	9	–	12	.429	27	–	28	.491
Cal State Northridge ‍‍‍	8	–	13	.381	14	–	42	.250
UC Irvine ‍‍‍	8	–	13	.381	21	–	35	.375
UC Santa Barbara ‍‍‍	8	–	13	.381	25	–	28	.472
Pacific ‍‍‍	6	–	15	.286	27	–	27	.500
† – Conference champion y – Invited to the NCAA tournament As of June 30, 2003; Rankings from Collegiate Baseball

The 2003 Cal State Fullerton Titans baseball team represented California State University, Fullerton in the 2003 NCAA Division I baseball season. The Titans played their home games at Goodwin Field, and played as part of the Big West Conference. The team was coached by George Horton in his seventh season as head coach at Cal State Fullerton.

The Titans reached the College World Series, their twelfth appearance in Omaha, where they finished in third place after winning a game each against LSU and Stanford and losing a pair of semifinal games to eventual runner-up Stanford.

== Personnel ==
=== Roster ===
2003 Cal State Fullerton Titans roster
Pitchers: 10 - Ricky Romero - Freshman; 11 - Tim Jimenez - Sophomore; 25 - Darric Merrell - Junior; 26 - Ryan Schreppel - Freshman; 30 - Jared Eichelberger - Freshman; 31 - Wes Littleton - Junior; 32 - Chad Cordero - Junior; 37 - Evan Myrick - Freshman; 38 - Dustin Miller - Freshman; 40 - Geoff Tesmer - Freshman; 42 - Travis Ingle - Junior; 48 - Sean Martin - Senior; 49 - Jason Windsor - Junior; 50 - John Estes - Freshman; 51 - Nick Lovato - Senior; 52 - John Tucker - Junior	Catchers: 3 - Kurt Suzuki - Sophomore; 35 - John Curtis - Freshman; 43 - Eric Echevarria - Freshman; 44 - P. J. Pilittere - Junior; 46 - Sergio Pedroza - Freshman; Outfielders: 1 - Joe Turgeon - Sophomore; 5 - Trevor Mortensen - Sophomore; 20 - David Fischer - Senior; 22 - Kyle Boyer - Junior; 24 - Bobby Andrews - Freshman; 27 - Danny Dorn - Freshman; 33 - Shane Costa - Junior; 34 - Shawn Scobee - Freshman; 47 - Adam Cooper - Sophomore	Infielders: 2 - Justin Smyres - Senior; 4 - Jason Corapci - Senior; 6 - Blake Davis - Freshman; 12 - Mike Martinez - Senior; 13 - Neil Walton - Freshman; 15 - Ronnie Prettyman - Sophomore; 17 - Richie Burgos - Junior; 19 - Brett Pill - Freshman; 23 - Justin Turner - Freshman; 45 - Jake Mendrin - Freshman

=== Coaches ===
2003 Cal State Fullerton Titans baseball coaching staff
- 8 - George Horton - Head coach - 7th Season
- 18 - Dave Serrano - Assistant coach/Recruiting coordinator - 7th Season
- 28 - Rick Vanderhook - Assistant coach - 17th Season
- 39 - Chad Baum - Assistant coach - 4th Season

== Schedule and results ==
Legend
Cal State Fullerton win
Cal State Fullerton loss

2003 Cal State Fullerton Titans baseball game log
Regular season

January/February
Date	Opponent	Rank	Site/Stadium	Score	Overall Record	Big West Record
Jan 31	No. 9 Stanford*	No. 7	Goodwin Field • Fullerton, CA	W 8–0	1–0	
Feb 1	No. 9 Stanford*	No. 7	Goodwin Field • Fullerton, CA	W 10–2	2–0	
Feb 2	No. 9 Stanford*	No. 7	Goodwin Field • Fullerton, CA	W 8–2	3–0	
Feb 7	at Fresno State*	No. 7	Pete Beiden Field • Fresno, CA	W 12–0	4–0	
Feb 8	at Fresno State*	No. 7	Pete Beiden Field • Fresno, CA	W 10–1	5–0	
Feb 9	at Fresno State*	No. 7	Pete Beiden Field • Fresno, CA	W 10–4	6–0	
Feb 14	at UNLV*	No. 3	Earl Wilson Stadium • Paradise, NV	W 23–3	7–0	
Feb 15	at UNLV*	No. 3	Earl Wilson Stadium • Paradise, NV	W 14–1	8–0	
Feb 16	at UNLV*	No. 3	Earl Wilson Stadium • Paradise, NV	L 6–8	8–1	
Feb 21	Nevada*	No. 3	Goodwin Field • Fullerton, CA	W 10–9^{14}	9–1	
Feb 22	Nevada*	No. 3	Goodwin Field • Fullerton, CA	W 7–0	10–1	
Feb 23	Nevada*	No. 3	Goodwin Field • Fullerton, CA	W 5–2	11–1	
Feb 28	No. 22 Tulane*	No. 2	Goodwin Field • Fullerton, CA (Kia Baseball Bash)	W 2–1	12–1	

March
Date	Opponent	Rank	Site/Stadium	Score	Overall Record	Big West Record
Mar 1	No. 8 Texas*	No. 2	Goodwin Field • Fullerton, CA (Kia Baseball Bash)	W 14–4	13–1	
Mar 2	UCLA*	No. 2	Goodwin Field • Fullerton, CA (Kia Baseball Bash)	W 7–1	14–1	
Mar 4	Pepperdine*	No. 2	Goodwin Field • Fullerton, CA	W 11–2	15–1	
Mar 7	at Minnesota*	No. 2	Hubert H. Humphrey Metrodome • Minneapolis, MN	L 1–7	15–2	
Mar 8	at Minnesota*	No. 2	Hubert H. Humphrey Metrodome • Minneapolis, MN	W 6–1	16–2	
Mar 9	at Minnesota*	No. 2	Hubert H. Humphrey Metrodome • Minneapolis, MN	L 7–8^{8}	16–3	
Mar 11	San Diego*	No. 5	Goodwin Field • Fullerton, CA	W 16–6	17–3	
Mar 14	at USC*	No. 5	Dedeaux Field • Los Angeles, CA	L 2–3	17–4	
Mar 16	at USC*	No. 5	Dedeaux Field • Los Angeles, CA	W 11–3	18–4	
Mar 19	at Loyola Marymount*	No. 5	George C. Page Stadium • Los Angeles, CA	L 2–3	18–5	
Mar 21	Cal State Northridge*	No. 5	Goodwin Field • Fullerton, CA	W 10–0	19–5	
Mar 22	Cal State Northridge*	No. 5	Goodwin Field • Fullerton, CA	W 7–6	20–5	
Mar 23	Cal State Northridge*	No. 5	Goodwin Field • Fullerton, CA	W 10–1	21–5	
Mar 25	at San Diego*	No. 5	John Cunningham Stadium • San Diego, CA	W 6–1	22–5	
Mar 28	at No. 7 Long Beach State*	No. 5	Blair Field • Long Beach, CA	L 2–3	22–6	
Mar 29	at No. 7 Long Beach State*	No. 5	Blair Field • Long Beach, CA	W 7–0	23–6	
Mar 30	at No. 7 Long Beach State*	No. 5	Blair Field • Long Beach, CA	W 7–5	24–6	

April
Date	Opponent	Rank	Site/Stadium	Score	Overall Record	Big West Record
Apr 2	at Pepperdine*	No. 3	Eddy D. Field Stadium • Malibu, CA	L 1–2	24–7	
Apr 4	Pacific	No. 3	Goodwin Field • Fullerton, CA	W 10–1	25–7	1–0
Apr 5	Pacific	No. 3	Goodwin Field • Fullerton, CA	W 7–0	26–7	2–0
Apr 6	Pacific	No. 3	Goodwin Field • Fullerton, CA	W 4–2	27–7	3–0
Apr 8	Loyola Marymount*	No. 3	Goodwin Field • Fullerton, CA	W 22–6	28–7	
Apr 11	at Cal State Northridge	No. 3	Matador Field • Northridge, CA	L 4–6	28–8	3–1
Apr 12	at Cal State Northridge	No. 3	Matador Field • Northridge, CA	W 3–0	29–8	4–1
Apr 13	at Cal State Northridge	No. 3	Matador Field • Northridge, CA	W 13–4	30–8	5–1
Apr 15	UCLA*	No. 3	Goodwin Field • Fullerton, CA	W 11–1	31–8	
Apr 17	UC Santa Barbara	No. 3	Goodwin Field • Fullerton, CA	W 8–3	32–8	6–1
Apr 18	UC Santa Barbara	No. 3	Goodwin Field • Fullerton, CA	W 16–7	33–8	7–1
Apr 19	UC Santa Barbara	No. 3	Goodwin Field • Fullerton, CA	W 14–4	34–8	8–1
Apr 22	at UCLA*	No. 1	Jackie Robinson Stadium • Los Angeles, CA	W 11–1	35–8	
Apr 25	at Cal Poly	No. 1	Robin Baggett Stadium • San Luis Obispo, CA	W 11–3	36–8	9–1
Apr 26	at Cal Poly	No. 1	Robin Baggett Stadium • San Luis Obispo, CA	W 26–7	37–8	10–1
Apr 27	at Cal Poly	No. 1	Robin Baggett Stadium • San Luis Obispo, CA	W 4–3	38–8	11–1

May
Date	Opponent	Rank	Site/Stadium	Score	Overall Record	Big West Record
May 2	at UC Riverside	No. 1	Riverside Sports Complex • Riverside, CA	L 3–13	38–9	11–2
May 3	at UC Riverside	No. 1	Riverside Sports Complex • Riverside, CA	L 3–4	38–10	11–3
May 4	at UC Riverside	No. 1	Riverside Sports Complex • Riverside, CA	L 1–5	38–11	11–4
May 5	vs USC*	No. 6	Edison Field • Anaheim, CA	W 8–2	39–11	
May 9	UC Irvine	No. 6	Goodwin Field • Fullerton, CA	L 3–5	39–12	11–5
May 10	UC Irvine	No. 6	Goodwin Field • Fullerton, CA	W 6–4	40–12	12–5
May 11	UC Irvine	No. 6	Goodwin Field • Fullerton, CA	W 9–1	41–12	13–5
May 16	No. 5 Long Beach State	No. 6	Goodwin Field • Fullerton, CA	W 4–3	42–12	14–5
May 17	No. 5 Long Beach State	No. 6	Goodwin Field • Fullerton, CA	L 1–4	42–13	14–6
May 18	No. 5 Long Beach State	No. 6	Goodwin Field • Fullerton, CA	W 9–7	43–13	15–6

Postseason

NCAA Fullerton Regional
Date	Opponent	Rank/Seed	Site/Stadium	Score	Overall Record	Reg Record
May 30	(5) San Diego	No. 5 (1)	Goodwin Field • Fullerton, CA	W 3–1	44–13	1–0
May 31	No. 26 (3) Notre Dame	No. 5 (1)	Goodwin Field • Fullerton, CA	W 4–3	45–13	2–0
June 1	No. 26 (3) Notre Dame	No. 5 (1)	Goodwin Field • Fullerton, CA	W 8–1	46–13	3–0

NCAA Fullerton Super Regional
Date	Opponent	Rank/Seed	Site/Stadium	Score	Overall Record	SR Record
June 6	No. 4 Arizona State	No. 5 (7)	Goodwin Field • Fullerton, CA	W 5–1	47–13	1–0
June 7	No. 4 Arizona State	No. 5 (7)	Goodwin Field • Fullerton, CA	L 6–7	47–14	1–1
June 8	No. 4 Arizona State	No. 5 (7)	Goodwin Field • Fullerton, CA	W 5–1	48–14	2–1

College World Series
Date	Opponent	Rank/Seed	Site/Stadium	Score	Overall Record	CWS Record
June 13	No. 4 (2) LSU	No. 2 (7)	Johnny Rosenblatt Stadium • Omaha, NE	W 8–2	49–14	1–0
June 15	No. 3 (6) Stanford	No. 2 (7)	Johnny Rosenblatt Stadium • Omaha, NE	W 6–5	50–14	2–0
June 18	No. 3 (6) Stanford	No. 2 (7)	Johnny Rosenblatt Stadium • Omaha, NE	L 3–5	50–15	2–1
June 19	No. 3 (6) Stanford	No. 2 (7)	Johnny Rosenblatt Stadium • Omaha, NE	L 5–7^{10}	50–16	2–2

== Rankings ==
Ranking movements Legend: ██ Increase in ranking ██ Decrease in ranking
	Week																				
Poll	Pre	1	2	3	4	5	6	7	8	9	10	11	12	13	14	15	16	17	18	19	Final
Coaches'		*																			3
Baseball America																					3
Collegiate Baseball^	7	7	3	3	2	2	5	5	5	3	3	3	1	1	6	6	6	5	5	2	3
NCBWA†	8	7	4	5	5	5	5	5	5	3	3	3	2	1	7	5	5	5	5*	5*	3

^ Collegiate Baseball ranked 40 teams in their preseason poll, but only ranked 30 teams weekly during the season.
† NCBWA ranks 30 teams in their preseason poll, but only ranks 25 teams weekly during the season.
* A new poll was not released for this week, so for comparison purposes, the previous week's ranking is inserted in this week's slot.
