= 2003 Florida Gators baseball team =

American college baseball season

2003 Florida Gators baseball

Coral Gables Regional, 3–2
- Conference: Southeastern Conference
- Record: 37–21–1 (13–16–1 SEC)
- Head coach: Pat McMahon (2nd year)
- Assistant coach: John Cohen (2nd year); Ross Jones (2nd year)
- Home stadium: Alfred A. McKethan Stadium

2003 Southeastern Conference baseball standings
	Conf.						Overall
Team	W		L		T	PCT	W		L		T	PCT
Eastern
No. 6 South Carolina ^{x}‍‍‍^{y}	19	–	11	–	0	.633	42	–	20	–	0	.677
Vanderbilt ‍‍‍	14	–	16	–	0	.467	27	–	28	–	0	.491
Florida ‍‍‍^{y}	13	–	16	–	1	.450	37	–	21	–	1	.636
Tennessee ‍‍‍	13	–	17	–	0	.433	31	–	24	–	0	.564
Georgia ‍‍‍	10	–	20	–	0	.333	29	–	26	–	0	.527
Kentucky ‍‍‍	9	–	20	–	0	.310	24	–	32	–	0	.429
Western
No. 7 LSU ^{x}‍†‍‍^{y}	20	–	9	–	1	.683	45	–	22	–	1	.669
No. 20 Auburn ‍‍‍^{y}	18	–	12	–	0	.600	42	–	21	–	0	.667
No. 24 Mississippi State ‍‍‍^{y}	17	–	12	–	0	.586	42	–	20	–	0	.677
Ole Miss ‍‍‍^{y}	17	–	13	–	0	.567	35	–	27	–	0	.565
Alabama ‍‍‡‍^{y}	14	–	16	–	0	.467	38	–	24	–	0	.613
Arkansas ‍‍‍^{y}	14	–	16	–	0	.467	35	–	22	–	0	.614
x – Division champion † – Conference champion ‡ – Tournament champion y – Invited to the NCAA tournament As of June 30, 2003; Rankings from Collegiate Baseball

The 2003 Florida Gators baseball team represented the University of Florida in the sport of baseball during the 2003 college baseball season. The Gators competed in Division I of the National Collegiate Athletic Association (NCAA) and the Eastern Division of the Southeastern Conference (SEC). They played their home games at Alfred A. McKethan Stadium, on the university's Gainesville, Florida campus. The team was coached by Pat McMahon, who was in his second season at Florida.

== Roster ==
2003 Florida Gators baseball team
Players
Coaches

#	Pos.	Name	B/T	Height	Weight	Year	Home town
44	RHP	Bryan Ball	R/R	6 ft 3 in (1.91 m)	185 lb (84 kg)	Fr	Punta Gorda, FL
47	RHP	David Bartelt	R/R	6 ft 1 in (1.85 m)	196 lb (89 kg)	So	Odessa, FL
6	OF	Stephen Barton	L/R	5 ft 9 in (1.75 m)	177 lb (80 kg)	Fr	Miami, FL
16	RHP	Derek Bell	R/R	5 ft 11 in (1.8 m)	163 lb (74 kg)	Fr	Jupiter, FL
32	LHP	Matt Bomeisl	L/L	5 ft 10 in (1.78 m)	171 lb (78 kg)	Jr	Miami, FL
48	RHP	Tommy Boss	R/R	6 ft 2 in (1.88 m)	210 lb (95 kg)	So	Dunnellon, FL
9	OF	John Paul Castro	R/R	5 ft 10 in (1.78 m)	184 lb (83 kg)	Jr	Key West, FL
7	OF	Jeff Corsaletti	L/R	6 ft 0 in (1.83 m)	190 lb (86 kg)	So	Port Charlotte, FL
28	C	Matt Cresap	R/R	5 ft 11 in (1.8 m)	165 lb (75 kg)	Jr	Tallahassee, FL
4	INF	Brett Dowdy	R/R	6 ft 1 in (1.85 m)	186 lb (84 kg)	Jr	Bradenton, FL
39	C	Bo Dring	R/R	5 ft 10 in (1.78 m)	175 lb (79 kg)	Jr	Myakka City, FL
23	RHP	Connor Falkenbach	R/R	5 ft 11 in (1.8 m)	185 lb (84 kg)	So	Parkland, FL
22	OF	Mario Garza	L/R	6 ft 0 in (1.83 m)	205 lb (93 kg)	Sr	Melbourne, FL
34	LHP	Jamie Goldfarb	R/L	6 ft 0 in (1.83 m)	190 lb (86 kg)	Sr	Merritt Island, FL
2	INF	Matt Graziano	R/R	6 ft 0 in (1.83 m)	170 lb (77 kg)	Jr	Gainesville, FL
43	OF	Ben Harrison	R/R	6 ft 4 in (1.93 m)	205 lb (93 kg)	Jr	Key West, FL
45	RHP	Ben Hedgecock (injured)	R/R	6 ft 4 in (1.93 m)	202 lb (92 kg)	Sr	Tampa, FL
21	RHP	Justin Hoyman	R/R	6 ft 4 in (1.93 m)	175 lb (79 kg)	So	Cocoa, FL
54	RHP	Jimmy Kubek	R/R	6 ft 3 in (1.91 m)	218 lb (99 kg)	Fr	Seminole, FL
31	RHP	Christian Madson	R/R	6 ft 8 in (2.03 m)	250 lb (113 kg)	Fr	Valrico, FL
5	INF	Matt Maley	L/R	6 ft 1 in (1.85 m)	165 lb (75 kg)	Jr	Miami, FL
33	C	Joe Mercadante	R/R	5 ft 10 in (1.78 m)	200 lb (91 kg)	Sr	Gainesville, FL
35	RHP	Darren O'Day	R/R	6 ft 4 in (1.93 m)	222 lb (101 kg)	Fr	Jacksonville, FL
27	LHP	Mike Pete	L/L	5 ft 11 in (1.8 m)	180 lb (82 kg)	So	Brandon, FL
25	LHP	Tom Potter	L/L	6 ft 1 in (1.85 m)	195 lb (88 kg)	Jr	Naples, FL
17	RHP	Andy Putnel	R/R	6 ft 1 in (1.85 m)	200 lb (91 kg)	Fr	Auburndale, FL
46	C	Greg Quatrino	R/R	6 ft 0 in (1.83 m)	210 lb (95 kg)	Fr	Tampa, FL
49	OF	Fritz Reichardt	R/R	6 ft 4 in (1.93 m)	230 lb (104 kg)	Sr	Gainesville, FL
13	OF	Jake Riordan	R/R	6 ft 0 in (1.83 m)	173 lb (78 kg)	Sr	Gainesville, FL
24	INF	Lee Roberson	L/L	6 ft 0 in (1.83 m)	194 lb (88 kg)	Jr	Fayetteville, GA
55	C	Brian Rose	R/R	6 ft 2 in (1.88 m)	225 lb (102 kg)	Sr	Miami, FL
20	RHP	Pat Rumble	R/R	5 ft 10 in (1.78 m)	171 lb (78 kg)	So	Jacksonville, FL
40	RHP	Ryan Sadowski	R/R	6 ft 3 in (1.91 m)	180 lb (82 kg)	So	Davie, FL
42	LHP	Adam Sanabria	L/L	6 ft 1 in (1.85 m)	192 lb (87 kg)	So	Longwood, FL
12	INF	C.J. Smith	R/R	6 ft 3 in (1.91 m)	208 lb (94 kg)	So	Tampa, FL
41	INF	Seth Steinhauer	L/R	6 ft 4 in (1.93 m)	215 lb (98 kg)	Fr	Stuart, FL
14	RHP	Justin Stiver	R/R	6 ft 1 in (1.85 m)	170 lb (77 kg)	Fr	Englewood, FL
29	INF	Justin Tordi	R/R	6 ft 1 in (1.85 m)	192 lb (87 kg)	Fr	Orlando, FL
1	INF	Jonathan Tucker	S/R	5 ft 7 in (1.7 m)	167 lb (76 kg)	So	El Sobrante, CA

Head coach

Pat McMahon

Assistant coach(es)

John Cohen
Ross Jones

Legend

- (C) Team captain
- (S) Suspended
- (I) Ineligible
- Injured
- Current redshirt

Roster

== Schedule ==
2003 Florida Gators baseball game log
Regular season
February

Date	Opponent	Rank	Stadium Site	Score	Win	Loss	Save	Attendance	Overall Record	SEC Record
February 7	Mercer		McKethan Stadium	15–5	Falkenbach (1–0)	Morrison (1–2)	None	2,420	1–0	–
February 8	Mercer		McKethan Stadium	22–2	Hoyman (1–0)	Bishop (1–1)	None	1,535	2–0	–
February 12	Charleston Southern		McKethan Stadium	10-9^{10}	Roberson (1–0)	Holmen (0–1)	None	1,377	3–0	–
February 14	No. 14 Miami (FL); Rivalry		McKethan Stadium	2–9	Touchet (1–0)	O'Day (0–1)	None	2,226	3–1	–
February 15	No. 14 Miami (FL); Rivalry		McKethan Stadium	5–3	Roberson (2–0)	Bongiovanni (1–1)	None	3,594	4–1	–
February 19	Florida A&M		McKethan Stadium	17–2	Pete (1–0)	Patrick (1–2)	None	1,392	5–1	–
February 21	Hofstra		McKethan Stadium	17–6	Falkenbach (2–0)	Smar (0–1)	None	1,327	6–1	–
February 23 (1)	Hofstra		McKethan Stadium	13–2	Hoyman (2–0)	Cosentino (0–1)	None	–	7–1	–
February 23 (2)	Hofstra		McKethan Stadium	28–6	Boss (1–0)	Taylor (0–1)	None	1,924	8–1	–
February 25	South Florida	No. 23	McKethan Stadium	13-12^{14}	Potter (1–0)	Griffin (1–1)	None	1,267	9–1	–

March

Date	Opponent	Rank	Stadium Site	Score	Win	Loss	Save	Attendance	Overall Record	SEC Record
March 1	Siena	No. 23	McKethan Stadium	11–1	Potter (2–0)	Bitter (0–3)	None	1,428	10–1	–
March 2	Siena	No. 23	McKethan Stadium	5–4	O'Day (1–1)	Cabot (0–3)	None	1,016	11–1	–
March 5	Gardner–Webb	No. 16	McKethan Stadium	9–5	Ball (1–0)	Martin (2–2)	None	1,029	12–1	–
March 7	at No. 1 Florida State; Rivalry	No. 16	Dick Howser Stadium; Tallahassee, FL	4–5	Lynch (4–0)	Pete (1–1)	Hodges (3)	3,652	12–2	–
March 8	at No. 1 Florida State; Rivalry	No. 16	Dick Howser Stadium	7–9	Davidson (1–0)	Ball (1–1)	Hodges (4)	4,028	12–3	–
March 9	No. 1 Florida State; Rivalry	No. 16	McKethan Stadium	9–8	Hoyman (3–0)	Cannon (0–1)	Sanabria (1)	2,859	13–3	–
March 11	Pace	No. 16	McKethan Stadium	9–2	Ball (2–1)	Van Riper (0–1)	None	1,448	14–3	–
March 12	Pace	No. 16	McKethan Stadium	12–2	Madson (1–0)	Huff (0–1)	None	1,170	15–3	–
March 14	at No. 18 LSU	No. 16	Alex Box Stadium; Baton Rouge, LA	0–9	Wilson (4–2)	Falkenbach (2–1)	None	7,835	15–4	0–1
March 15	at No. 18 LSU	No. 16	Alex Box Stadium	2–3	Pettit (3–0)	Hoyman (3–1)	None	7,698	15–5	0–2
March 16	at No. 18 LSU	No. 16	Alex Box Stadium	8–8	None	None	None	7,375	15–5–1	0–2–1
March 18	Columbia	No. 22	McKethan Stadium	24–8	Madson (2–0)	Oleksak (0–1)	None	1,247	16–5–1	–
March 19	Army	No. 22	McKethan Stadium	16–0	Ball (3–1)	Copello (1–1)	None	1,601	17–5–1	–
March 21	No. 18 Alabama	No. 22	McKethan Stadium	3–8	Tankersley (4–0)	Sanabria (0–1)	None	1,913	17–6–1	0–3–1
March 22	No. 18 Alabama	No. 22	McKethan Stadium	6–1	Hoyman (4–1)	Carter (4–2)	None	2,864	18–6–1	1–3–1
March 23	No. 18 Alabama	No. 22	McKethan Stadium	6–5	O'Day (2–1)	Reed (1–1)	None	1,139	19–6–1	2–3–1
March 26	Spain (national team) (exh.)	No. 18	McKethan Stadium	18–1^{7}	Roberson	Ventura	None	–	–	–
March 28	Tennessee	No. 18	McKethan Stadium	5–3	Falkenbach (3–1)	Hochevar (4–2)	None	2,386	20–6–1	3–3–1
March 29	Tennessee	No. 18	McKethan Stadium	5–1	Hoyman (5–1)	Tharpe (3–2)	None	2,964	21–6–1	4–3–1
March 30	Tennessee	No. 18	McKethan Stadium	7–5	Falkenbach (4–1)	Hochevar (4–3)	None	1,059	22–6–1	5–3–1

April

Date	Opponent	Rank	Stadium Site	Score	Win	Loss	Save	Attendance	Overall Record	SEC Record
April 2	Florida A&M	No. 13	McKethan Stadium	14–2	Rumble (1–0)	Nunez (1–1)	None	1,023	23–6–1	–
April 4	at Vanderbilt	No. 13	Hawkins Field; Nashville, TN	1–2	Sowers (1–4)	Falkenbach (4–2)	Lewis (3)	1,011	23–7–1	5–4–1
April 5	at Vanderbilt	No. 13	Hawkins Field	2–4	Ransom (3–0)	Hoyman (5–2)	Buschmann (3)	768	23–8–1	5–5–1
April 6	at Vanderbilt	No. 13	Hawkins Field	1–4	Mullins (2–4)	Madson (2–1)	Lewis (4)	353	23–9–1	5–6–1
April 9	Stetson	No. 23	McKethan Stadium	10–4	O'Day (3–1)	Lincoln (2–7)	None	1,395	24–9–1	–
April 11	South Carolina	No. 23	McKethan Stadium	4–9	Bondurant (4–2)	O'Day (3–2)	None	2,085	24–10–1	5–7–1
April 12	South Carolina	No. 23	McKethan Stadium	2–10	Marchbanks (7–2)	Hoyman (5–3)	None	2,809	24–11–1	5–8–1
April 13	South Carolina	No. 23	McKethan Stadium	13–4	Pete (2–1)	Donald (0–1)	Boss (1)	1,952	25–11–1	6–8–1
April 15	Bethune–Cookman		McKethan Stadium	9–1	Ball (4–1)	Worrall (1–1)	None	1,154	26–11–1	–
April 18	at Georgia		Foley Field; Athens, GA	4–5	Ruthven (3–4)	Boss (1–1)	Benefield (2)	1,538	26–12–1	6–9–1
April 19	at Georgia		Foley Field	4–3	Hoyman (6–3)	Woods (1–4)	None	1,892	27–12–1	7–9–1
April 20	at Georgia		Foley Field	8–4	Madson (3–1)	Westphal (3–2)	None	1,028	28–12–1	8–9–1
April 23	Jacksonville State		McKethan Stadium	11–8	Pete (3–1)	Andres (1–2)	Falkenbach (1)	1,273	29–12–1	–
April 26 (1)	No. 13 Mississippi State		McKethan Stadium	13–5	Sanabria (1–1)	Maholm (6–2)	None	–	30–12–1	9–9–1
April 26 (2)	No. 13 Mississippi State		McKethan Stadium	5–6	Gant (2–1)	Boss (1–2)	Papelbon (6)	2,053	30–13–1	9–10–1
April 27	No. 13 Mississippi State		McKethan Stadium	14–6	Hoyman (7–3)	Nicholas (4–2)	None	2,638	31–13–1	10–10–1

May

Date	Opponent	Rank	Stadium Site	Score	Win	Loss	Save	Attendance	Overall Record	SEC Record
May 3 (1)	at No. 18 Auburn		Plainsman Park; Auburn, AL	2–7	Hughey (5–4)	Ball (4–2)	None	–	31–14–1	10–11–1
May 3 (2)	at No. 18 Auburn		Plainsman Park	8–6	Boss (2–2)	Dennis (2–2)	Falkenbach (2)	3,489	32–14–1	11–11–1
May 4	at No. 18 Auburn		Plainsman Park	3–4	Paxton (6–1)	Hoyman (7–4)	Speigner (1)	3,048	32–15–1	11–12–1
May 9	at Ole Miss		Swayze Field; Oxford, MS	0–2	Beam (7–1)	Boss (2–3)	Head (11)	2,422	32–16–1	11–13–1
May 10	at Ole Miss		Swayze Field	3–8	Wright (4–2)	Hoyman (7–5)	Cupps (2)	2,539	32–17–1	11–14–1
May 11	at Ole Miss		Swayze Field	2–4	Holliman (4–5)	Pete (3–2)	Head (12)	2,003	32–18–1	11–15–1
May 16	Kentucky		McKethan Stadium	19–0	Hoyman (8–5)	Wade (3–7)	None	2,876	33–18–1	12–15–1
May 17	Kentucky		McKethan Stadium	13–4	Pete (4–2)	Castle (6–5)	None	2,588	34–18–1	13–16–1
May 18	Kentucky		McKethan Stadium	5–7	Gibson (3–3)	O'Day (3–3)	None	2,078	34–19–1	13–17–1

Post-season
NCAA tournament: Coral Gables Regional

Date	Opponent	Rank	Stadium Site	Score	Win	Loss	Save	Attendance	Overall Record	Regional Record
May 30	vs. No. 14 Florida Atlantic		Mark Light Stadium; Coral Gables, FL	3–4	Core (10–2)	Hoyman (8–6)	Pillsbury (5)	–	34–20–1	0–1
May 31 (1)	vs. Bethune–Cookman		Mark Light Stadium	8–6	Pete (5–2)	Rivera (6–5)	Falkenbach (3)	–	35–20–1	1–1
May 31 (2)	vs. No. 14 Florida Atlantic		Mark Light Stadium	22–14	Potter (3–0)	Della Rocco (2–1)	None	5,251	36–20–1	2–1
June 1 (1)	at No. 13 Miami (FL); Rivalry		Mark Light Stadium	15–5	O'Day (4–3)	Camardese (9–1)	Pete (1)	–	37–20–1	3–1
June 1 (2)	at No. 13 Miami (FL); Rivalry		Mark Light Stadium	10–13	Valdes-Fauli (3–0)	Boss (2–4)	None	3,494	37–21–1	3–2

Rankings from Collegiate Baseball. All times Eastern. Retrieved from FloridaGators.com

== See also ==
- Florida Gators
- List of Florida Gators baseball players
