= 2003 Miami Hurricanes baseball team =

American college baseball season

2003 Miami Hurricanes baseball

NCAA Coral Gables Super Regional champions NCAA Coral Gables Regional champions

College World Series, 1–2
- Conference: Independent
- Record: 45–17–1
- Head coach: Jim Morris (10th year)
- Home stadium: Mark Light Field

2003 NCAA Division I baseball independents standings
| | Conf. | | | | | | Overall |
| Team | W | | L | | T | PCT | W | | L | | T | PCT |
|---|---|---|---|---|---|---|---|---|---|---|---|---|
| No. 5 Miami (FL) ‍‍‍^{y} | 0 | – | 0 | – | 0 | – | 45 | – | 17 | – | 1 | .722 |
| Savannah State ‍‍‍ | 0 | – | 0 | – | 0 | – | 34 | – | 15 | – | 0 | .694 |
| Texas A&M–Corpus Christi ‍‍‍ | 0 | – | 0 | – | 0 | – | 33 | – | 17 | – | 0 | .660 |
| Birmingham–Southern ‍‍‍ | 0 | – | 0 | – | 0 | – | 33 | – | 18 | – | 0 | .647 |
| Sacramento State ‍‍‍ | 0 | – | 0 | – | 0 | – | 33 | – | 24 | – | 0 | .579 |
| Centenary ‍‍‍ | 0 | – | 0 | – | 0 | – | 23 | – | 33 | – | 0 | .411 |
| Texas–Pan American ‍‍‍ | 0 | – | 0 | – | 0 | – | 21 | – | 33 | – | 0 | .389 |
| Lipscomb ‍‍‍ | 0 | – | 0 | – | 0 | – | 16 | – | 31 | – | 0 | .340 |
| IPFW ‍‍‍ | 0 | – | 0 | – | 0 | – | 17 | – | 33 | – | 0 | .340 |
| NYIT ‍‍‍ | 0 | – | 0 | – | 0 | – | 15 | – | 32 | – | 0 | .319 |
| Morris Brown ‍‍‍ | 0 | – | 0 | – | 0 | – | 10 | – | 33 | – | 0 | .233 |
| Hawaii–Hilo ‍‍‍ | 0 | – | 0 | – | 0 | – | 9 | – | 38 | – | 0 | .191 |
| Pace ‍‍‍ | 0 | – | 0 | – | 0 | – | 9 | – | 39 | – | 0 | .188 |
y – Invited to the NCAA tournament As of June 30, 2003; Rankings from Collegiate Baseball

The 2003 Miami Hurricanes baseball team represented the University of Miami in the 2003 NCAA Division I baseball season. The Hurricanes played their home games at Mark Light Field. The team was coached by Jim Morris in his tenth season at Miami.

The Hurricanes reached the College World Series, where they finished tied for fifth after recording a win against Southwest Missouri State and a pair of losses to Texas.

== Personnel ==
=== Roster ===
2003 Miami Hurricanes roster
| Pitchers: - Marcelo Albir - Freshman; - Vince Bongiovanni - Sophomore; - Brandon Camardese - Sophomore; - Chiqui Chirino - Freshman; - J.D. Cockroft - Junior; - Andrew Cohn - Junior; - Ryan Dixon - Sophomore; - George Huguet - Junior; - Tom King - Freshman; - Andrew Lane - Freshman; - Brad Newman - Freshman; - Alex Perez - Junior; - Ryan Sneir - Sophomore; - Dan Touchet - Junior; - Shawn Valdes-Fauli - Sophomore | Catchers: - Greg Dini - Sophomore; - T.J. Hacker - Sophomore; - Erick San Pedro - Sophomore; Infielders: - Alex Blanco - Sophomore; - Ryan Braun - Freshman; - Paco Figueroa - Sophomore; - Joey Hooft - Sophomore; - Adam Ricks - Junior; - Gaby Sanchez - Freshman | Outfielders: - Matt Barkett - Sophomore; - Brian Barton - Junior; - Jim Burt - Junior; - Danny Figueroa - Sophomore; - Richard Giannotti - Sophomore; - Tom Shannon - Junior; Unknown: - Oman Reinoso - Freshman |

=== Coaches ===
2003 Miami Hurricanes baseball coaching staff
- Jim Morris – Head coach – 10th year

== Schedule and results ==
Legend
| Miami win |
| Miami loss |
Rankings from Collegiate Baseball poll from that week.
(Tournament seeds in parentheses)

2003 Miami Hurricanes baseball game log
Regular season

February
| Date | Opponent | Rank | Site/stadium | Score | Overall record |
|---|---|---|---|---|---|
| Feb 5 | No. 28 FIU | No. 14 | Mark Light Field • Coral Gables, FL | W 12–7 | 1–0 |
| Feb 6 | Campbell | No. 14 | Mark Light Field • Coral Gables, FL | W 13–2 | 2–0 |
| Feb 7 | Campbell | No. 14 | Mark Light Field • Coral Gables, FL | W 10–3 | 3–0 |
| Feb 8 | Campbell | No. 14 | Mark Light Field • Coral Gables, FL | L 9–12 | 3–1 |
| Feb 14 | at Florida | No. 14 | Alfred A. McKethan Stadium • Gainesville, FL | W 9–2 | 4–1 |
| Feb 15 | at Florida | No. 14 | Alfred A. McKethan Stadium • Gainesville, FL | L 3–5 | 4–2 |
| Feb 21 | San Diego State | No. 13 | Mark Light Field • Coral Gables, FL | W 6–3 | 5–2 |
| Feb 22 | San Diego State | No. 13 | Mark Light Field • Coral Gables, FL | W 4–1 | 6–2 |
| Feb 23 | San Diego State | No. 13 | Mark Light Field • Coral Gables, FL | W 6–3 | 7–2 |
| Feb 28 | The Citadel | No. 13 | Mark Light Field • Coral Gables, FL | L 7–8 | 7–3 |

March
| Date | Opponent | Rank | Site/stadium | Score | Overall record |
|---|---|---|---|---|---|
| Mar 1 | The Citadel | No. 13 | Mark Light Field • Coral Gables, FL | W 6–1 | 8–3 |
| Mar 2 | The Citadel | No. 13 | Mark Light Field • Coral Gables, FL | W 14–6 | 9–3 |
| Mar 7 | at No. 23 Tennessee | No. 14 | Lindsey Nelson Stadium • Knoxville, TN | W 5–2 | 10–3 |
| Mar 8 | at No. 23 Tennessee | No. 14 | Lindsey Nelson Stadium • Knoxville, TN | W 8–4 | 11–3 |
| Mar 9 | at No. 23 Tennessee | No. 14 | Lindsey Nelson Stadium • Knoxville, TN | W 10–4 | 12–3 |
| Mar 11 | No. 29 South Florida | No. 13 | Mark Light Field • Coral Gables, FL | W 3–2 | 13–3 |
| Mar 12 | No. 29 South Florida | No. 13 | Mark Light Field • Coral Gables, FL | W 6–4 | 14–3 |
| Mar 14 | Rutgers | No. 13 | Mark Light Field • Coral Gables, FL | W 15–5 | 15–3 |
| Mar 16 | Rutgers | No. 13 | Mark Light Field • Coral Gables, FL | L 7–8 | 15–4 |
| Mar 18 | St. Peter's | No. 13 | Mark Light Field • Coral Gables, FL | W 16–2 | 16–4 |
| Mar 19 | Stony Brook | No. 13 | Mark Light Field • Coral Gables, FL | W 9–8 | 17–4 |
| Mar 21 | Boston College | No. 13 | Mark Light Field • Coral Gables, FL | W 18–8 | 18–4 |
| Mar 22 | Boston College | No. 13 | Mark Light Field • Coral Gables, FL | W 17–5 | 19–4 |
| Mar 26 | vs Harvard | No. 13 | Homestead Sports Complex • Homestead, FL | W 10–9 | 20–4 |
| Mar 28 | No. 2 Georgia Tech | No. 13 | Mark Light Field • Coral Gables, FL | W 7–6 | 21–4 |
| Mar 29 | No. 2 Georgia Tech | No. 13 | Mark Light Field • Coral Gables, FL | W 13–8 | 22–4 |
| Mar 30 | No. 2 Georgia Tech | No. 13 | Mark Light Field • Coral Gables, FL | W 17–16 | 23–4 |

April
| Date | Opponent | Rank | Site/stadium | Score | Overall record |
|---|---|---|---|---|---|
| Apr 2 | No. 25 Florida Atlantic | No. 7 | Mark Light Field • Coral Gables, FL | L 3–5 | 23–5 |
| Apr 4 | Oral Roberts | No. 7 | Mark Light Field • Coral Gables, FL | W 8–5 | 24–5 |
| Apr 5 | Oral Roberts | No. 7 | Mark Light Field • Coral Gables, FL | L 1–10 | 24–6 |
| Apr 6 | Oral Roberts | No. 7 | Mark Light Field • Coral Gables, FL | W 11–8 | 25–6 |
| Apr 11 | at Virginia | No. 12 | Davenport Field • Charlottesville, VA | W 6–1 | 26–6 |
| Apr 12 | at Virginia | No. 12 | Davenport Field • Charlottesville, VA | W 10–4 | 27–6 |
| Apr 13 | at Virginia | No. 12 | Davenport Field • Charlottesville, VA | L 2–17 | 27–7 |
| Apr 16 | at FIU | No. 14 | University Park Stadium • Miami, FL | W 6–4 | 28–7 |
| Apr 18 | No. 2 Florida State | No. 14 | Mark Light Field • Coral Gables, FL | L 2–4 | 28–8 |
| Apr 19 | No. 2 Florida State | No. 14 | Mark Light Field • Coral Gables, FL | L 4–6 | 28–9 |
| Apr 20 | No. 2 Florida State | No. 14 | Mark Light Field • Coral Gables, FL | T 7–7 | 28–9–1 |
| Apr 25 | at No. 2 Florida State | No. 17 | Dick Howser Stadium • Tallahassee, FL | L 0–1 | 28–10–1 |
| Apr 26 | at No. 2 Florida State | No. 17 | Dick Howser Stadium • Tallahassee, FL | W 14–5 | 29–10–1 |
| Apr 27 | at No. 2 Florida State | No. 17 | Dick Howser Stadium • Tallahassee, FL | L 0–12 | 29–11–1 |

May
| Date | Opponent | Rank | Site/stadium | Score | Overall record |
|---|---|---|---|---|---|
| May 2 | Pace | No. 17 | Mark Light Field • Coral Gables, FL | W 27–1 | 30–11–1 |
| May 3 | Pace | No. 17 | Mark Light Field • Coral Gables, FL | W 23–1 | 31–11–1 |
| May 4 | Pace | No. 17 | Mark Light Field • Coral Gables, FL | W 20–2 | 32–11–1 |
| May 9 | at Jacksonville | No. 16 | John Sessions Stadium • Jacksonville, FL | W 12–2 | 33–11–1 |
| May 10 | at Jacksonville | No. 16 | John Sessions Stadium • Jacksonville, FL | L 8–11 | 33–12–1 |
| May 11 | at Jacksonville | No. 16 | John Sessions Stadium • Jacksonville, FL | L 4–5 | 33–13–1 |
| May 16 | Savannah State | No. 15 | Mark Light Field • Coral Gables, FL | W 12–7 | 34–13–1 |
| May 17 | Savannah State | No. 15 | Mark Light Field • Coral Gables, FL | W 11–2 | 35–13–1 |
| May 18 | Savannah State | No. 15 | Mark Light Field • Coral Gables, FL | W 11–3 | 36–13–1 |
| May 19 | Savannah State | No. 15 | Mark Light Field • Coral Gables, FL | W 6–4 | 37–13–1 |
| May 22 | at No. 5 Long Beach State | No. 17 | Blair Field • Long Beach, CA | W 6–4 | 38–13–1 |
| May 23 | at No. 5 Long Beach State | No. 17 | Blair Field • Long Beach, CA | W 3–2 | 39–13–1 |
| May 24 | at No. 5 Long Beach State | No. 17 | Blair Field • Long Beach, CA | L 3–7 | 39–14–1 |

Postseason

NCAA Coral Gables Regional
| Date | Opponent | Seed | Site/stadium | Score | Overall record | NCAAT record |
|---|---|---|---|---|---|---|
| May 30 | (4) Bethune–Cookman | No. 13 (1) | Mark Light Field • Coral Gables, FL | W 10–5 | 40–14–1 | 1–0 |
| May 31 | No. 14 (2) Florida Atlantic | No. 13 (1) | Mark Light Field • Coral Gables, FL | W 1–0 | 41–14–1 | 2–0 |
| June 1 | (3) Florida | No. 13 (1) | Mark Light Field • Coral Gables, FL | L 5–15 | 41–15–1 | 2–1 |
| June 1 | (3) Florida | No. 13 (1) | Mark Light Field • Coral Gables, FL | W 13–10 | 42–15–1 | 3–1 |

NCAA Coral Gables Super Regional
| Date | Opponent | Seed | Site/stadium | Score | Overall record | SR Record |
|---|---|---|---|---|---|---|
| June 7 | No. 9 NC State | No. 10 (8) | Mark Light Field • Coral Gables, FL | W 10–9 | 43–15–1 | 1–0 |
| June 8 | No. 9 NC State | No. 10 (8) | Mark Light Field • Coral Gables, FL | W 11–5^{11} | 44–15–1 | 2–0 |

College World Series
| Date | Opponent | Seed | Site/stadium | Score | Overall record | CWS record |
|---|---|---|---|---|---|---|
| June 14 | No. 5 Texas | No. 6 (8) | Johnny Rosenblatt Stadium • Omaha, NE | L 2–13 | 44–16–1 | 0–1 |
| June 16 | No. 8 Southwest Missouri State | No. 6 (8) | Johnny Rosenblatt Stadium • Omaha, NE | W 7–5 | 45–16–1 | 1–1 |
| June 17 | No. 5 Texas | No. 6 (8) | Johnny Rosenblatt Stadium • Omaha, NE | L 1–5 | 45–17–1 | 1–2 |
