= 2003 Rice Owls baseball team =

American college baseball season

2003 Rice Owls baseball

College World Series champions Western Athletic Conference champions
- Conference: Western Athletic Conference
- Record: 58–12 (25–5 WAC)
- Head coach: Wayne Graham (12th year)
- Assistant coaches: David Pierce (1st year); Mike Taylor (3rd year); Zane Curry (4th year)
- Home stadium: Reckling Park

Uniform
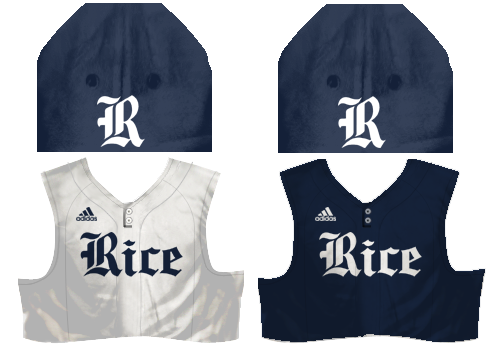

The 2003 Rice Owls baseball team represented Rice University in the 2003 NCAA Division I baseball season. The Owls played their home games at Reckling Park. The team was coached by Wayne Graham in his 12th season at Rice.

The Owls won 30 consecutive games to open the season 33–1 and won the Western Athletic Conference championship. Rice went on to win the College World Series, defeating the Stanford Cardinal in the championship series. It was the first national title that Rice had ever won in a team sport in the school's 91-year history.

== Roster ==
2003 Rice Owls roster
Pitchers: 21 Philip Humber – Sophomore; 33 Jeff Niemann – Sophomore; 30 Wade Townsend – Sophomore; 20 Josh Baker – Junior; 14 David Aardsma – Junior; 24 Colin Matheny – Freshman; 34 Steven Herce – Senior; 10 Lance Pendleton – Freshman; 17 Justin Farris* – Senior; 8 Marcos Ramos** – Sophomore; *Injured reserve; **not on postseason roster	Infielders: 1 Sean Hirsch – Junior; 5 Drew Skaggs* – Senior; 11 Paul Janish – Sophomore; 13 Enrique Cruz – Junior; 15 Matt Moake – Sophomore; 22 Matt Ueckert – Freshman; 23 Craig Stansberry – Junior; 27 Vincent Sinisi – Junior	Outfielders: 2 Matt Emerson – Freshman; 3 Matt Cavanaugh – Freshman; 4 Jeff Jorgenson – Sophomore; 7 Chris Kolkhorst – Junior; 9 Austin Davis – Sophomore; 16 Dane Bubela – Senior; Catchers: 12 Jeff Blackinton – Junior; 19 Justin Ruchti – Senior; 29 Jon Gillespie – Sophomore; 35 Lyndon Duplessis – Freshman

== Schedule ==
2003 Rice Owls baseball game log
Regular season
February

Date	Opponent	Site/stadium	Score	Rice Decision	Attendance	Overall record	WAC record
February 11	Texas-San Antonio	Reckling Park	6–4	Baker (W; 1–0)	2,432	1–0	–
February 14	Texas A&M	Minute Maid Park	10–5	Niemann (W; 1–0)	8,405	2–0	–
February 15	Baylor	Minute Maid Park	4–3	Humber (W; 1–0)	14,484	3–0	–
February 16	Alabama	Minute Maid Park	5–6	Ueckert (L; 1–0)	10,416	3–1	–
February 18	at Houston	Cougar Field	3–0	Townsend (W; 1–0)	1,116	4–1	–
February 19	at Southwest Texas State	Bobcat Baseball Stadium	6–0	Matheny (W; 1–0)	1,608	5–1	–
February 22	Stetson	Reckling Park	11–6	Humber (W; 2–0)	2,323	6–1	–
February 22	Mississippi	Reckling Park	6–0	Niemann (W; 2–0)	2,562	7–1	–
February 23	Texas–Arlington	Reckling Park	1–0 (10)	Aardsma (W; 1–0)	2,657	8–1	–
February 28	Southwest Texas State	Reckling Park	8–3	Niemann (W; 3–0)	2,054	9–1	–

March

Date	Opponent	Site/stadium	Score	Rice Decision	Attendance	Overall record	WAC record
March 1	Southwest Texas State	Reckling Park	7–5	Baker (W; 2–0)	2,317	10–1	–
March 2	Southwest Texas State	Reckling Park	10–4	Humber (W; 3–0)	2,275	11–1	–
March 4	Houston	Reckling Park	4–3	Aardsma (W; 2–0)	2,618	12–1	–
March 7	at Louisiana Tech	J.C. Love Field	4–3	Niemann (W; 4–0)	529	13–1	1–0
March 8	at Louisiana Tech	J.C. Love Field	5–3	Humber (W; 4–0)	1,011	14–1	2–0
March 9	at Louisiana Tech	J.C. Love Field	12–0	Baker (W; 3–0)	827	15–1	3–0
March 11	Texas	Reckling Park	2–1 (10)	Aardsma (W; 3–0)	4,525	16–1	–
March 14	at Hawaii	Les Murakami Stadium	9–4	Niemann (W; 5–0)	2,919	17–1	4–0
March 15	at Hawaii	Les Murakami Stadium	9–2	Humber (W; 5–0)	3,426	18–1	5–0
March 16	at Hawaii	Les Murakami Stadium	11–1	Baker (W; 4–0)	2,271	19–1	6–0
March 18	Nebraska	Reckling Park	4–1	Townsend (W; 2–0)	3,359	20–1	–
March 19	at Houston	Cougar Field	7–6 (11)	Aardsma (W; 4–0)	2,271	21–1	–
March 21	Liberty	Reckling Park	20–1	Humber (W; 6–0)	2,851	22–1	–
March 22	Liberty	Reckling Park	10–4	Baker (W; 5–0)	2,412	23–1	–
March 23	Liberty	Reckling Park	5–4	Niemann (W; 6–0)	2,348	24–1	–
March 25	Baylor	Reckling Park	4–3	Townsend (W; 3–0)	3,683	25–1	–
March 28	San Jose State	Reckling Park	12–2	Humber (W; 7–0)	2,180	26–1	7–0
March 29	San Jose State	Reckling Park	21–1	Niemann (W; 7–0)	2,837	27–1	8–0
March 30	San Jose State	Reckling Park	8–1	Baker (W; 6–0)	3,118	28–1	9–0

April

Date	Opponent	Site/stadium	Score	Rice Decision	Attendance	Overall record	WAC record
April 1	Houston	Reckling Park	11–0	Townsend (W; 4–0)	3,320	29–1	–
April 4	Hawaii	Reckling Park	11–0	Humber (W; 8–0)	3,215	30–1	10–0
April 5	Hawaii	Reckling Park	2–0	Niemann (W; 8–0)	2,835	31–1	11–0
April 6	Hawaii	Reckling Park	8–1	Baker (W; 7–0)	2,614	32–1	12–0
April 8	Texas A&M	Reckling Park	8–0	Townsend (W; 5–0)	4,414	33–1	–
April 9	Lamar	Reckling Park	5–7	Aardsma (L; 4–1)	2,417	33–2	–
April 11	at Fresno State	Pete Beiden Field	3–7	Humber (L; 8–1)	2,727	33–3	12–1
April 12	at Fresno State	Pete Beiden Field	9–2	Niemann (W; 9–0)	2,724	34–3	13–1
April 13	at Fresno State	Pete Beiden Field	3–2	Townsend (W; 6–0)	2,564	35–3	14–1
April 15	at Sam Houston State	Don Sanders Stadium	1–8	Aardsma (L; 4–2)	481	35–4	–
April 16	at Houston	Cougar Field	1–5	Herce (L; 0–1)	1,672	35–5	–
April 18	Nevada	Reckling Park	10–5	Matheny (W; 2–0)	3,103	36–5	15–1
April 19	Nevada	Reckling Park	3–0	Niemann (W; 10–0)	3,314	37–5	16–1
April 20	Nevada	Reckling Park	5–6	Herce (L; 0–2)	2,313	37–6	16–2
April 22	at Lamar	Vincent–Beck Stadium	5–9	Matheny (L; 2–1)	1,406	37–7	–
April 24	Louisiana Tech	Reckling Park	2–1	Humber (W; 9–1)	2,715	38–7	17–2
April 25	Louisiana Tech	Reckling Park	13–3	Niemannn (W; 11–0)	3,156	39–7	18–2
April 26	Louisiana Tech	Reckling Park	8–2	Baker (W; 8–0)	3,044	40–7	19–2

May

Date	Opponent	Site/stadium	Score	Rice Decision	Attendance	Overall record	WAC record
May 7	Sam Houston State	Reckling Park	10–5	Herce (W; 1–2)	2,820	41–7	–
May 9	at Nevada	William Peccole Park	13–11	Humber (W; 10–1)	1,206	42–7	20–2
May 10	at Nevada	William Peccole Park	7–4	Niemann (W; 12–0)	1,636	43–7	21–2
May 11	at Nevada	William Peccole Park	7–8 (10)	Aardsma (L; 4–3)	1,875	43–8	21–3
May 14	at Saint Mary's	Louis Guisto Field	10–6	Matheny (W; 3–1)	356	44–8	–
May 16	at San Jose State	San Jose Municipal Stadium	12–6	Aardsma (W; 5–3)	553	45–8	22–3
May 17	at San Jose State	San Jose Municipal Stadium	11–0	Niemann (W; 13–0)	612	46–8	23–3
May 17	at San Jose State	Blethen Field	6–8	Townsend (L; 6–1)	553	46–9	23–4
May 23	Fresno State	Reckling Park	1–2	Humber (L; 10–2)	3,015	46–10	23–5
May 24	Fresno State	Reckling Park	13–2	Niemann (W; 14–0)	2,938	47–10	24–5
May 25	Fresno State	Reckling Park	3–2	Townsend (W; 7–1)	3,105	48–10	25–5

NCAA tournament: Houston Regional

Date	Opponent	Site/stadium	Score	Rice Decision	Attendance	Overall record
May 30	vs. McNeese State	Reckling Park	3–2 (10)	Townsend (W; 8–1)	4,014	49–10
May 31	vs. Wichita State	Reckling Park	10–1	Niemann (W; 15–0)	3,769	50–10
June 1	vs. Wichita State	Reckling Park	5–2	Townsend (W; 9–1)	3,528	51–10

NCAA tournament: Houston Super Regional

Date	Opponent	Site/stadium	Score	Rice Decision	Attendance	Overall record
June 7	vs. Houston	Reckling Park	2–5	Humber (L; 10–3)	4,427	51–11
June 8	vs. Houston	Reckling Park	10–2	Niemann (W; 16–0)	4,435	52–11
June 9	vs. Houston	Reckling Park	5–2	Townsend (W; 10–1)	4,417	53–11

NCAA tournament: College World Series

Date	Opponent	Site/stadium	Score	Rice Decision	Attendance	Overall record
June 14	vs. SW Missouri State	Rosenblatt Stadium	4–2	Niemann (W; 17–0)	23,248	54–11
June 16	vs. Texas	Rosenblatt Stadium	12–2	Townsend (W; 11–1)	24,842	55–11
June 18	vs. Texas	Rosenblatt Stadium	5–4	Aardsma (W; 6–1)	23,170	56–11
June 21	vs. Stanford	Rosenblatt Stadium	4–3 (10)	Aardsma (W; 7–3)	23,741	57–11
June 22	vs. Stanford	Rosenblatt Stadium	3–8	Townsend (L; 11–2)	17,907	57–12
June 23	vs. Stanford	Rosenblatt Stadium	14–2	Humber (W; 11–3)	18,494	58–12

== Awards and honors ==
Dane Bubela

- All-WAC First Team

Enrique Cruz

- All-America Third Team
- College World Series All-Tournament Team
- All-WAC First Team

Austin Davis

- All-WAC First Team

Philip Humber

- All-America Second Team
- All-WAC First Team

Paul Janish

- All-WAC Second Team

Jeff Jorgensen

- All-WAC First Team

Chris Kolkhorst

- College World Series All-Tournament Team
- All-WAC First Team

Jeff Niemann

- All-America First Team
- College World Series All-Tournament Team
- WAC Pitcher of the Year

Justin Ruchti

- All-WAC Second Team

Vincent Sinisi

- All-WAC First Team

Wade Townsend

- All-America First Team
- All-WAC First Team

== Owls in the 2003 MLB draft ==
The following members of the Rice Owls baseball program were drafted in the 2003 Major League Baseball draft.

Player	Position	Round	Overall	MLB team
David Aardsma	RHP	1st	22nd	San Francisco Giants
Vincent Sinisi	1B	2nd	46th	Texas Rangers
Craig Stansberry	3B	5th	135th	Pittsburgh Pirates
Jeff Jorgensen	OF	7th	209th	Houston Astros
Justin Ruchti	C	9th	266th	Seattle Mariners
Enrique Cruz	SS	14th	424th	New York Yankees
Steven Herce	RHP	17th	495th	Pittsburgh Pirates
Dane Bubela	OF	22nd	646th	Texas Rangers
