= 2003 NCAA Division I baseball tournament =

American college sports championship

- Season: 2003
- Teams: 64
- Finals site: Johnny Rosenblatt Stadium; Omaha, Nebraska
- Champions: Rice (1st title)
- Runner-up: Stanford (15th CWS Appearance)
- Winning coach: Wayne Graham (1st title)
- MOP: John Hudgins (Stanford)

The 2003 NCAA Division I baseball tournament was held May 30 through June 23, 2003 to conclude the 2003 NCAA Division I baseball season. Sixty-four NCAA Division I college baseball teams met after having played their way through a regular season, and for some, a conference tournament, to play in the NCAA tournament. The tournament culminated with 8 teams in the College World Series at historic Rosenblatt Stadium in Omaha, Nebraska.

ESPN, which held the rights to the College World Series, began televising super regional games in 2003. As part of the contract with ESPN, four super regionals would begin on Friday and run through Sunday, while the other four super regionals would begin Saturday and run through Monday.

The 2003 College World Series saw a format change and the championship was decided by a best-of-three series. From 1950 through 1987, the College World Series was a true double elimination tournament. From 1988 through 2002, there were two double elimination pools, with the winner of each facing off in a one game championship.

In the 2003 championship series, Rice defeated Stanford two games to one. John Hudgins became the 16th player to win the College World Series Most Outstanding Player Award from a losing team.

== Bids ==
=== Automatic bids ===
Conference champions from 30 Division I conferences earned automatic bids to regionals. The remaining 34 spots were awarded to schools as at-large invitees.

Conference	School	Berth type
America East	Northeastern	Tournament champion
ACC	Georgia Tech	Tournament champion
Atlantic Sun	Jacksonville	Tournament champion
A-10	Richmond	Tournament champion
Big East	Notre Dame	Tournament champion
Big South	Coastal Carolina	Tournament champion
Big Ten	Ohio State	Tournament champion
Big 12	Texas	Tournament champion
Big West	Long Beach State	Regular-season champion
CAA	VCU	Tournament champion
Conference USA	Southern Miss	Tournament champion
Horizon League	UIC	Tournament champion
Ivy League	Princeton	Championship series winner
MAAC	Le Moyne	Tournament champion
MAC	Eastern Michigan	Tournament champion
Mid-Con	Oral Roberts	Tournament champion
MEAC	Bethune-Cookman	Tournament champion
Missouri Valley	Wichita State	Tournament champion
MWC	UNLV	Tournament champion
NEC	Central Connecticut	Tournament champion
OVC	Murray State	Tournament champion
Pac-10	Stanford	Regular-season champion
Patriot League	Bucknell	Tournament champion
SEC	Alabama	Tournament champion
SoCon	Western Carolina	Tournament champion
Southland	McNeese State	Tournament champion
SWAC	Southern	Tournament champion
Sun Belt	Middle Tennessee	Tournament champion
WCC	Pepperdine	Championship series winner
WAC	Rice	Regular-season champion

=== Bids by conference ===
Conference	Total	Schools
Southeastern	8	Alabama, Arkansas, Auburn, Florida, LSU, Mississippi State, Ole Miss, South Carolina
Atlantic Coast	5	Clemson, Florida State, Georgia Tech, North Carolina, NC State
Big 12	5	Baylor, Missouri, Nebraska, Texas, Texas A&M
Conference USA	4	East Carolina, Houson, Southern Miss, Tulane
Pacific-10	4	Arizona, Arizona State, Stanford, Washington
Atlantic Sun	3	Florida Atlantic, Jacksonville, Stetson
Big West	3	Cal State Fullerton, Long Beach State, UC Riverside
Sun Belt	3	Middle Tennessee, New Mexico State, South Alabama
Big East	2	Notre Dame, Rutgers
Big Ten	2	Minnesota, Ohio State
Colonial Athletic	2	UNC Wilmington, VCU
Missouri Valley	2	Southwest Missouri State, Wichita State
Southland	2	Lamar, McNeese State
West Coast	2	Pepperdine, San Diego
America East	1	Northeastern
Atlantic 10	1	Richmond
Big South	1	Coastal Carolina
Horizon	1	UIC
Independent	1	Miami (FL)
Ivy	1	Princeton
Metro Atlantic	1	Le Moyne
Mid-American	1	Eastern Michigan
Mid-Continent	1	Oral Roberts
Mid-Eastern	1	Bethune-Cookman
Mountain West	1	UNLV
Northeast	1	Central Connecticut
Ohio Valley	1	Murray State
Patriot	1	Bucknell
Southern	1	Western Carolina
Southwestern Athletic	1	Southern
Western Athletic	1	Rice

== Tournament notes ==
- UC Riverside, Illinois-Chicago, and UNC Wilmington were making their first NCAA tournament appearance.

=== CWS records tied or broken ===
- Total attendance: 260,091
- Largest margin of victory in a championship game: 12
- Stanford became the first team to lose three games at one College World Series.

== National seeds ==
Bold indicates CWS participant.

1. Florida State
2. **LSU**
3. Georgia Tech
4. Auburn
5. **Rice**
6. **Stanford**
7. **Cal State Fullerton**
8. **Miami (FL)**

== Regionals and super regionals ==
Bold indicates winner.

=== Tallahassee Super Regional ===
First round	Second round
1	**Florida State**	**6**
4	Jacksonville	0
1	Florida State	6
2	**South Alabama**	**8**
3	Rutgers	1
2	**South Alabama**	**14**
Tallahassee Regional–Dick Howser Stadium
4	Jacksonville	5
3	**Rutgers**	**8**
3	Rutgers	7
1	**Florida State**	**17**
1	**Texas**	**7**
4	Bucknell	0
1	**Texas**	**7**
3	Lamar	3
3	**Lamar**	**3**
2	Arkansas	2
Austin Regional–Disch–Falk Field
4	Bucknell	7
2	**Arkansas**	**10**
2	Arkansas	6
3	**Lamar**	**7**^{11}

Regional finals
2	South Alabama	5	2
1	**Florida State**	**13**	**12**
1	**Texas**	2	**6**
3	Lamar	**6**	3

Super regionals
1	Florida State	3	5	—
**Texas**	**8**	**6**	—

=== Baton Rouge Super Regional ===
First round	Second round
1	**LSU**	**11**
4	Northeastern	8
1	**LSU**	**13**
2	Tulane	5
3	UNC Wilmington	3
2	**Tulane**	**8**
Baton Rouge Regional–Alex Box Stadium
4	Northeastern	6
3	**UNC Wilmington**	**12**
3	**UNC Wilmington**	**9**^{10}
2	Tulane	8
1	**Baylor**	**7**
4	Murray State	6
1	**Baylor**	**10**
3	Southern	3
3	**Southern**	**5**
2	Southern Miss	3
Hattiesburg Regional–Pete Taylor Park
4	Murray State	0
2	**Southern Miss**	**18**
2	**Southern Miss**	**18**
3	Southern	1

Regional finals
1	**LSU**	**9**^{11}	—
3	UNC Wilmington	8	—
1	**Baylor**	**3**	—
2	Southern Miss	2	—

Super regionals
2	**LSU**	1	**6**	**20**
Baylor	**4**	5	5

=== Columbia Super Regional ===
First round	Second round
1	Georgia Tech	4
4	**Stetson**	**5**
4	Stetson	2
2	**South Carolina**	**7**
3	East Carolina	0
2	**South Carolina**	**4**
Atlanta Regional–Russ Chandler Stadium
1	Georgia Tech	3
3	**East Carolina**	**10**
3	East Carolina	4
4	**Stetson**	**9**
1	**Mississippi State**	**10**
4	Middle Tennessee	4
1	Mississippi State	5
2	**North Carolina**	**10**
3	Missouri	3
2	**North Carolina**	**4**^{11}
Starkville Regional–Dudy Noble Field
4	Middle Tennessee	7
3	**Missouri**	**13**
3	Missouri	5
1	**Mississippi State**	**10**

Regional finals
2	**South Carolina**	**9**	—
4	Stetson	3	—
2	**North Carolina**	**8**^{11}	—
1	Mississippi State	6	—

Super regionals
**South Carolina**	**5**	**14**	—
North Carolina	4	4	—

=== Columbus Super Regional ===
First round	Second round
1	**Auburn**	**5**
4	Princeton	2
1	Auburn	2
3	**Ohio State**	**6**
3	**Ohio State**	**10**
2	Clemson	8
Auburn Regional–Plainsman Park
4	Princeton	6
2	**Clemson**	**7**^{10}
2	Clemson	0
1	**Auburn**	**15**
1	**Nebraska**	**16**
4	Eastern Michigan	11
1	Nebraska	2
3	**Southwest Missouri State**	**4**
3	**Southwest Missouri State**	**8**
2	Coastal Carolina	3
Lincoln Regional–Haymarket Park
4	**Eastern Michigan**	**9**
2	Coastal Carolina	8
4	Eastern Michigan	2
1	**Nebraska**	**18**

Regional finals
3	**Ohio State**	**9**	—
1	Auburn	7	—
3	**Southwest Missouri State**	5	**7**
1	Nebraska	**9**	0

Super regionals
Ohio State	8	7	—
**Southwest Missouri State**	**13**	**13**	—

=== Houston Super Regional ===
The Houston Super Regional was hosted by Rice at Reckling Park.

First round	Second round
1	**Rice**	**3**^{10}
4	McNeese State	2
1	**Rice**	**10**
3	Wichita State	1
3	**Wichita State**	**4**
2	Ole Miss	2
Houston Regional–Reckling Park
4	McNeese State	1
2	**Ole Miss**	**7**
2	Ole Miss	4
3	**Wichita State**	**5**
1	**Texas A&M**	**6**
4	Oral Roberts	3
1	**Texas A&M**	**16**
2	Alabama	5
3	Houston	3
2	**Alabama**	**9**
College Station Regional–Olsen Field
4	Oral Roberts	2
3	**Houston**	**4**
3	**Houston**	**16**
2	Alabama	8

Regional finals
1	**Rice**	**5**	—
3	Wichita State	2	—
1	Texas A&M	6	6
3	**Houston**	**7**	**7**

Super regionals
5	**Rice**	2	**10**	**5**
Houston	**5**	2	2

=== Palo Alto Super Regional ===
First round	Second round
1	**Stanford**	**9**
4	UIC	2
1	**Stanford**	**13**
3	UC Riverside	6
3	**UC Riverside**	**10**
2	Richmond	8
Palo Alto Regional–Sunken Diamond
4	UIC	0
2	**Richmond**	**5**
2	**Richmond**	**8**
3	UC Riverside	1
1	**Long Beach State**	**6**
4	Pepperdine	1
1	**Long Beach State**	**7**
3	Washington	2
3	**Washington**	**5**
2	Minnesota	3
Long Beach Regional–Blair Field
4	Pepperdine	5
2	**Minnesota**	**7**
2	Minnesota	1
3	**Washington**	**4**

Regional finals
1	**Stanford**	**19**	—
2	Richmond	6	—
1	**Long Beach State**	**7**	—
3	Washington	2	—

Super regionals
6	**Stanford**	**5**	**4**	—
Long Beach State	1	2	—

=== Fullerton Super Regional ===
First round	Second round
1	**Cal State Fullerton**	**3**
4	San Diego	1
1	**Cal State Fullerton**	**4**
3	Notre Dame	3
3	**Notre Dame**	**13**
2	Arizona	4
Fullerton Regional–Goodwin Field
4	**San Diego**	**5**
2	Arizona	2
4	San Diego	3
3	**Notre Dame**	**6**
1	**Arizona State**	**14**
4	Central Connecticut	2
1	**Arizona State**	**15**
3	New Mexico State	0
3	**New Mexico State**	**14**^{11}
2	UNLV	12
Tempe Regional–Packard Stadium
4	Central Connecticut	3
2	**UNLV**	**22**
2	**UNLV**	**16**
3	New Mexico State	10

Regional finals
1	**Cal State Fullerton**	**8**	—
3	Notre Dame	1	—
1	**Arizona State**	**16**	—
2	UNLV	1	—

Super regionals
7	**Cal State Fullerton**	**5**	6	**7**
Arizona State	1	**7**	1

=== Coral Gables Super Regional ===
First round	Second round
1	**Miami (FL)**	**10**
4	Bethune-Cookman	5
1	**Miami (FL)**	**1**
2	Florida Atlantic	0
3	Florida	3
2	**Florida Atlantic**	**4**
Coral Gables Regional–Mark Light Field
4	Bethune-Cookman	6
3	**Florida**	**8**
3	**Florida**	**22**
2	Florida Atlantic	14
1	**NC State**	**8**
4	Le Moyne	2
1	**NC State**	**4**^{10}
2	VCU	3
3	Western Carolina	0
2	**VCU**	**6**
Wilson Regional–Fleming Stadium
4	Le Moyne	5
3	**Western Carolina**	**9**
3	**Western Carolina**	**2**
2	VCU	0

Regional finals
1	**Miami (FL)**	5	**13**
3	Florida	**15**	10
1	**NC State**	**6**^{14}	—
3	Western Carolina	4	—

Super regionals
8	**Miami (FL)**	**10**	**11**^{11}	—
NC State	9	5	—

== College World Series ==
=== Participants ===
School	Conference	Record (conference)	Head coach	CWS appearances	Best CWS finish	CWS record Not including this year
Cal State Fullerton	Big West	48–14 (15–6)	George Horton	11 (last: 2001)	1st (1979, 1984, 1995)	25–18
LSU	SEC	45–20 (20–9)	Smoke Laval	11 (last: 2000)	1st (1991, 1993, 1996, 1997, 2000)	29–13
Miami (FL)	n/a	44–15–1 (n/a)	Jim Morris	19 (last: 2001)	1st (1982, 1985, 1999, 2001)	43–30
Southwest Missouri State	MVC	40–24 (19–11)	Keith Guttin	0 (last: none)	none	0–0
Rice	WAC	53–11 (25–5)	Wayne Graham	3 (last: 2002)	5th (1999)	1–6
South Carolina	SEC	44–20 (19–11)	Ray Tanner	6 (last: 2002)	2nd (1975, 1977, 2002)	13-12
Stanford	Pac-10	46–15 (18–6)	Mark Marquess	14 (last: 2002)	1st (1987, 1988)	33–24
Texas	Big 12	48–18 (19–8)	Augie Garrido	29 (last: 2002)	1st (1949, 1950, 1975, 1983, 2002)	68–49

=== Bracket ===
First round
**Texas**	**13**
8	Miami (FL)	2
5	**Rice**	**4**
Southwest Missouri State	2
8	**Miami (FL)**	**7**
Southwest Missouri State	5
2	LSU	2
7	**Cal State Fullerton**	**8**
6	**Stanford**	**8**
South Carolina	0
2	LSU	10
**South Carolina**	**11**

Second round
Texas	2
5	**Rice**	**12**
8	Miami (FL)	1
**Texas**	**5**
7	**Cal State Fullerton**	**6**
6	Stanford	5
South Carolina	6
6	**Stanford**	**13**

Semifinals
5	**Rice**	**5**	—
Texas	4	—
7	Cal State Fullerton	3	5*
6	**Stanford**	**5**	**7***

Finals
5	**Rice**	**4**^{10}	3	**14**
6	Stanford	3	**8**	2

=== Championship series ===
==== Saturday 6/21 Game #1 ====
Team	1	2	3	4	5	6	7	8	9	10	R	H	E
Stanford	3	0	0	0	0	0	0	0	0	0	**3**	**7**	**1**
Rice	0	0	1	2	0	0	0	0	0	1	**4**	**8**	**1**
WP: David Aardsma (7–3) LP: Ryan McCally (7–3); Attendance: 23,741

==== Sunday 6/22 Game #2 ====
Team	1	2	3	4	5	6	7	8	9	R	H	E
Rice	0	0	0	1	0	0	0	2	0	**3**	**10**	**2**
Stanford	1	0	2	0	0	0	5	0	X	**8**	**9**	**0**
WP: John Hudgins (14–3) LP: Wade Townsend (11–2); Attendance: 17,907

==== Monday 6/23 Game #3 ====
Team	1	2	3	4	5	6	7	8	9	R	H	E
Stanford	0	0	0	0	0	0	1	1	0	**2**	**5**	**2**
Rice	3	1	0	0	0	7	0	3	X	**14**	**14**	**0**
WP: Philip Humber (11–3) LP: Mark Romanczuk (12–2); Attendance: 18,494; Notes: Rice wins first national championship in any team sport in school history

=== All-Tournament Team ===
The following players were members of the College World Series All-Tournament Team.

Position	Player	School
P	**John Hudgins (MOP)**	Stanford
P	Jeff Niemann	Rice
C	Ryan Garko	Stanford
1B	Curtis Thigpen	Texas
2B	Enrique Cruz	Rice
3B	Johnny Ash	Stanford
SS	Justin Turner	Cal State Fullerton
OF	Chris Kolkhorst	Rice
OF	Danny Putnam	Stanford
OF	Carlos Quentin	Stanford
DH	P. J. Pilittere	Cal State Fullerton
