= Vince Sinisi =

Italian baseball player (born 1981)

- Outfielder / First baseman
- Born: November 7, 1981 (age 44); Houston, Texas, U.S.
- Bats: Left Throws: Left

Vincent James Sinisi (born November 7, 1981) is an Italian-American former baseball player who played internationally for the Italy national baseball team in 2006.

== Biography ==
A native of Houston, Texas, Sinisi attended The Woodlands High School and Rice University, where he played college baseball for the Rice Owls. In 2002, Sinisi was named the Western Athletic Conference's baseball player of the year. That year, he also played collegiate summer baseball with the Falmouth Commodores of the Cape Cod Baseball League.

The Texas Rangers selected Sinisi in the second round of the 2003 MLB draft. On May 11, 2006, the Rangers traded Sinisi and John Hudgins to the San Diego Padres for Freddy Guzmán and César Rojas.
