= John Hudgins =

- Pitcher
- Born: August 31, 1981 (age 44); Oklahoma City, Oklahoma, U.S.
- Bats: Right Throws: Right
- Stats at Baseball Reference

Career highlights and awards
- College World Series Most Outstanding Player (2003)

John Michael Hudgins (born August 31, 1981) is an American former professional baseball player. He is most notable for winning the 2003 College World Series Most Outstanding Player award while a junior at Stanford University. He is one of three players from Stanford University to win the award. The other two are Lee Plemel and Paul Carey.

== Career ==
Hudgins attended Mission Viejo High School prior to starring at Stanford University. In 2001 with Stanford, he went 1-5 with a 4.30 ERA. In 2002, he went 10-1 with a 4.71 ERA, and in 2003 he went 14-3 with a 2.99 ERA. After the 2002 season, he played collegiate summer baseball with the Yarmouth–Dennis Red Sox of the Cape Cod Baseball League, and was named a league all-star.

Hudgins was drafted by the Oakland Athletics in the 20th round of the 2000 MLB draft, however he did not sign. In the 2003 MLB draft, he was selected in the third round by the Texas Rangers. He was signed by scout Tim Fortugno, and began his professional career that year.

Playing for the Clinton LumberKings, he played in a single game in his debut professional season, striking out four batters in two innings. His professional career got rolling in 2004, as he split the season between the Stockton Ports, Oklahoma RedHawks and Frisco RoughRiders. He appeared in 30 total games, starting 25 of them and going 8-5 with a 3.14 ERA. The following year, he played for the RedHawks and RoughRiders, going a combined 4-9 in 22 games (21 starts). His ERA jumped to 5.70. He began the 2006 season in the Rangers organization, playing for the RedHawks. However, he was traded with minor leaguer Vince Sinisi to the San Diego Padres for Freddy Guzmán and minor leaguer Cesar Rojas on May 11. In his new organization, he played for the Portland Beavers and Mobile Bay Bears. He went a combined 6-5 with a 3.64 ERA in 2006. He played for the Peoria Saguaros of the Arizona Fall League in 2007 and in 2008 he played for the AZL Padres, going 0-1 with a 4.50 ERA in two games. He split 2009 between the San Antonio Missions and Portland Beavers, going a combined 1-3 with a 4.33 ERA in 39 games.

== See also ==
- Career statistics from Baseball Reference (Minors)
