= 2004 College Baseball All-America Team =

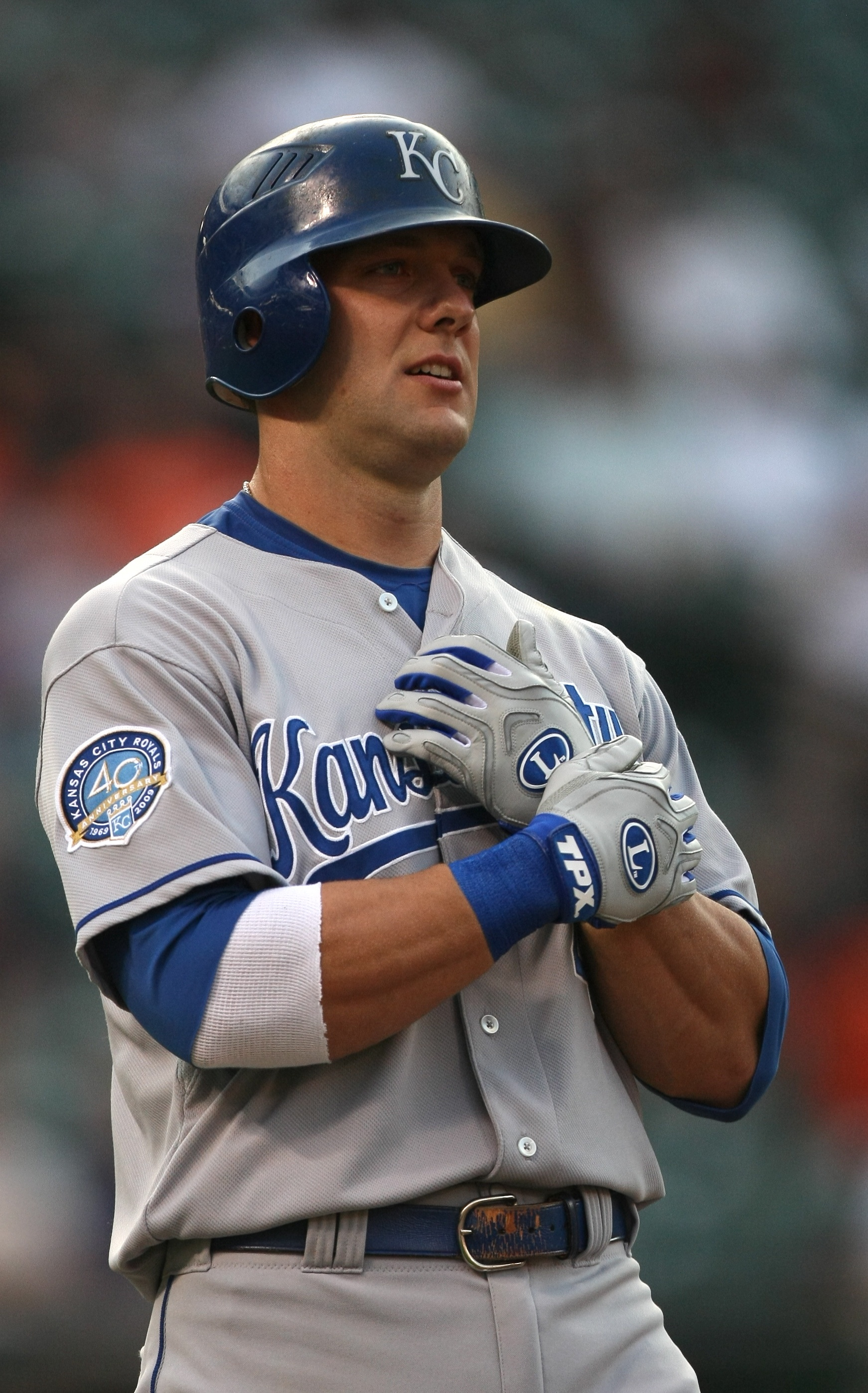
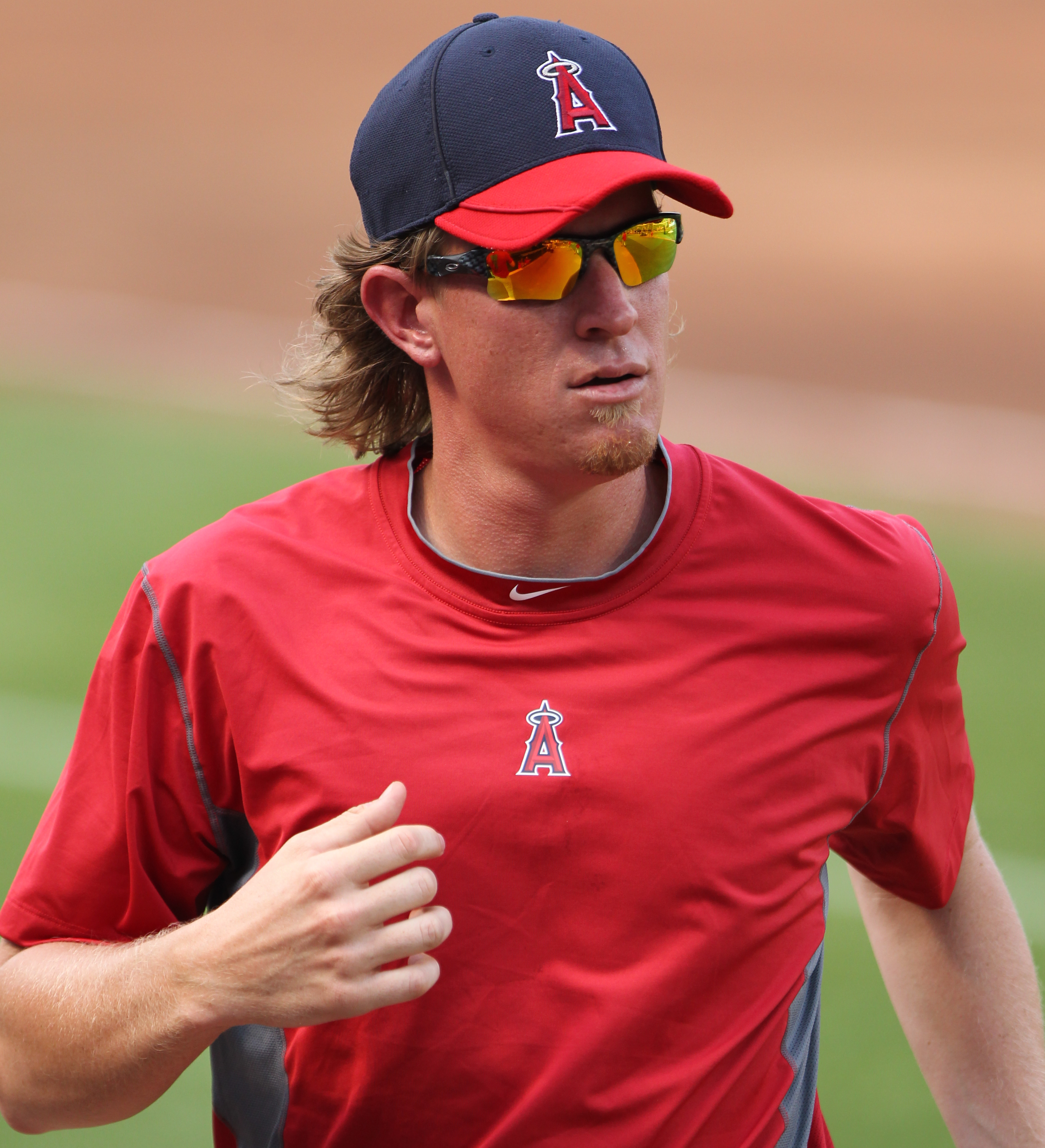
2004 All-Americans included two-time unanimous All-Americans Alex Gordon (left) and Jered Weaver (right).

This is a list of college baseball players named first team All-Americans for the 2004 NCAA Division I baseball season. From 2002 to 2005, there were five generally recognized All-America selectors for baseball: the American Baseball Coaches Association, Baseball America, Collegiate Baseball Newspaper, the National Collegiate Baseball Writers Association, and USA Today Sports Weekly. In order to be considered a "consensus" All-American, a player must have been selected by at least three of these.

== Key ==
A	American Baseball Coaches Association
B	Baseball America
C	Collegiate Baseball Newspaper
N	National Collegiate Baseball Writers Association
U	USA Today Sports Weekly
	Member of the National College Baseball Hall of Fame
	Consensus All-American – selected by all five organizations
	Consensus All-American – selected by three or four organizations

== All-Americans ==
Position	Name	School	#	A	B	C	N	U	Other awards and honors
Starting pitcher	Matt Fox	UCF	2	—	✓	✓	—	—	
Starting pitcher	J. P. Howell	Texas	5	✓	✓	✓	✓	✓	
Starting pitcher	Justin Hoyman	Florida	2	✓	—	✓	—	—	
Starting pitcher	Philip Humber	Rice	4	✓	—	✓	✓	✓	
Starting pitcher	Wade Townsend	Rice	4	—	✓	✓	✓	✓	
Starting pitcher	Jered Weaver	Long Beach State	5	✓	✓	✓	✓	✓	Dick Howser Trophy Golden Spikes Award ABCA Player of the Year Baseball America Player of the Year Collegiate Baseball Player of the Year Roger Clemens Award
Relief pitcher	Blair Erickson	UC Irvine	1	—	—	—	—	✓	
Relief pitcher	Nate Moore	Troy	1	—	✓	—	—	—	
Relief pitcher	Huston Street	Texas	2	✓	—	—	✓	—	
Relief pitcher	Austin Tubb	Southern Miss	2	—	—	✓	✓	—	
Catcher	Landon Powell	South Carolina	2	—	—	—	✓	✓	
Catcher	Kurt Suzuki	Cal State Fullerton	3	✓	✓	✓	—	—	Brooks Wallace Award Johnny Bench Award
First baseman	Billy Becher	New Mexico State	3	—	—	✓	✓	✓	
First baseman	Josh Brady	Texas Tech	1	✓	—	—	—	—	
First baseman	Mike Ferris	Miami (OH)	1	—	✓	—	—	—	
Second baseman	Jarrett Hoffpauir	Southern Miss	1	—	—	—	✓	—	
Second baseman / DH	Warner Jones	Vanderbilt	2	✓	✓	—	—	—	
Second baseman	Jed Lowrie	Stanford	3	—	✓	✓	—	✓	
Shortstop	Brian Bixler	Eastern Michigan	2	✓	—	✓	—	—	
Shortstop	Dustin Pedroia	Arizona State	3	—	✓	—	✓	✓	
Third baseman	Alex Gordon	Nebraska	5	✓	✓	✓	✓	✓	
Outfielder	Brad Corley	Mississippi State	1	—	✓	—	—	—	
Outfielder	Marshall Hubbard	North Carolina	2	✓	—	—	—	✓	
Outfielder / DH	Eddy Martinez-Esteve	Florida State	4	✓	✓	✓	✓	—	
Outfielder	Eric Nielsen	UNLV	2	✓	—	✓	—	—	
Outfielder	Danny Putnam	Stanford	1	—	✓	—	—	—	
Outfielder	Chris Rahl	William & Mary	4	✓	—	✓	✓	✓	
Outfielder	Jon Zeringue	LSU	3	✓	—	—	✓	✓	
Designated hitter	Ryan Jones	East Carolina	2	—	—	✓	✓	—	
Utility player	Dennis Bigley	Oral Roberts	1	✓	—	—	—	—	
Utility player	Stephen Head	Ole Miss	2	—	✓	—	—	✓	
Utility player	P. J. Hiser	Pittsburgh	1	—	—	✓	—	—	

== See also ==
- List of college baseball awards
