= 2003 LSU Tigers baseball team =

American college baseball season

2003 LSU Tigers baseball

NCAA Baton Rouge Regional champions NCAA Baton Rouge Super Regional champions SEC Tournament champions SEC champions

College World Series, 0–2
- Conference: Southeastern Conference
- Record: 45–22–1 (20–9–1 SEC)
- Head coach: Smoke Laval (2nd year)
- Home stadium: Alex Box Stadium

2003 Southeastern Conference baseball standings
	Conf.						Overall
Team	W		L		T	PCT	W		L		T	PCT
Eastern
No. 6 South Carolina ^{x}‍‍‍^{y}	19	–	11	–	0	.633	42	–	20	–	0	.677
Vanderbilt ‍‍‍	14	–	16	–	0	.467	27	–	28	–	0	.491
Florida ‍‍‍^{y}	13	–	16	–	1	.450	37	–	21	–	1	.636
Tennessee ‍‍‍	13	–	17	–	0	.433	31	–	24	–	0	.564
Georgia ‍‍‍	10	–	20	–	0	.333	29	–	26	–	0	.527
Kentucky ‍‍‍	9	–	20	–	0	.310	24	–	32	–	0	.429
Western
No. 7 LSU ^{x}‍†‍‍^{y}	20	–	9	–	1	.683	45	–	22	–	1	.669
No. 20 Auburn ‍‍‍^{y}	18	–	12	–	0	.600	42	–	21	–	0	.667
No. 24 Mississippi State ‍‍‍^{y}	17	–	12	–	0	.586	42	–	20	–	0	.677
Ole Miss ‍‍‍^{y}	17	–	13	–	0	.567	35	–	27	–	0	.565
Alabama ‍‍‡‍^{y}	14	–	16	–	0	.467	38	–	24	–	0	.613
Arkansas ‍‍‍^{y}	14	–	16	–	0	.467	35	–	22	–	0	.614
x – Division champion † – Conference champion ‡ – Tournament champion y – Invited to the NCAA tournament As of June 30, 2003; Rankings from Collegiate Baseball

The 2003 LSU Tigers baseball team represented Louisiana State University in the 2003 NCAA Division I baseball season. The Tigers played their home games at Alex Box Stadium, and played as part of the Southeastern Conference. The team was coached by Smoke Laval in his second season as head coach at LSU.

The Tigers won the SEC, claimed the championship in the SEC Tournament, then won the Baton Rouge Regional and Super Regional to reach the College World Series, their twelfth appearance in Omaha, where were eliminated after a pair of losses to Cal State Fullerton and South Carolina.

== Personnel ==
=== Roster ===
2003 LSU Tigers roster
Pitchers: 4 - Billy Sadler - Junior; 6 - Collin Smith - Junior; 8 - Brandon Nall - Junior; 12 - Jake Tompkins - Senior; 13 - Clay Dirks - Freshman; 23 - Chad Vaught - Senior; 25 - Will Harris - Freshman; 27 - Greg Smith - Freshman; 29 - Jordan Faircloth - Sophomore; 33 - Jason Determann - Freshman; 34 - Bo Pettit - Senior; 35 - Justin Meier - Freshman; 36 - Justin Gee - Freshman; 38 - Brian Wilson - Junior; 41 - Nate Bumstead - Junior; 46 - Lane Mestepey - Junior; 48 - Clint Bamert - Freshman; 60 - Chris McDougall - Freshman	Catchers: 9 - Dustin Weaver - Sophomore; 10 - Ty Jensen - Junior; 14 - Matt Liuzza - Freshman; 16 - Jon Zeringue - Sophomore; 50 - Shawn French - Senior; Outfielders: 1 - J.C. Holt - Sophomore; 24 - Bruce Sprowl - Sophomore; 28 - Ryan Patterson - Sophomore; 32 - Rhett Buteau - Sophomore; 40 - Quinn Stewart - Sophomore	Infielders: 2 - Matt Horwath - Freshman; 3 - Blake Gill - Sophomore; 5 - Aaron Hill - Junior; 7 - Ivan Naccarata - Junior; 11 - Michael Murray - Freshman; 21 - Clay Harris - Sophomore; 30 - Bobby DiLiberto - Junior; 47 - Eric Wiethorn - Senior

=== Coaches ===
2003 LSU Tigers baseball coaching staff
- Smoke Laval - Head coach - 2nd Season
- Jody Autery - Assistant coach
- Turtle Thomas - Assistant coach
- Brady Wiederhold - Assistant coach

== Schedule and results ==
Legend
LSU win
LSU loss

2003 LSU Tigers baseball game log
Regular season

February
Date	Opponent	Rank	Site/Stadium	Score	Overall Record	SEC Record
Feb 7	Northwestern State*	No. 6	Alex Box Stadium • Baton Rouge, LA	W 2–1	1–0	
Feb 8	Northwestern State*	No. 6	Alex Box Stadium • Baton Rouge, LA	W 10–5	2–0	
Feb 9	Northwestern State*	No. 6	Alex Box Stadium • Baton Rouge, LA	W 5–3	3–0	
Feb 11	at Centenary*	No. 6	Shehee Stadium • Shreveport, LA	W 15–0	4–0	
Feb 14	Kansas*	No. 6	Alex Box Stadium • Baton Rouge, LA	L 6–9	4–1	
Feb 16	Kansas*	No. 6	Alex Box Stadium • Baton Rouge, LA	L 4–6	4–2	
Feb 16	Kansas*	No. 6	Alex Box Stadium • Baton Rouge, LA	L 6–9^{7}	4–3	
Feb 18	Louisiana–Monroe*	No. 12	Alex Box Stadium • Baton Rouge, LA	W 9–4	5–3	
Feb 22	No. 20 Houston*	No. 12	Alex Box Stadium • Baton Rouge, LA	L 2–7	5–4	
Feb 23	No. 20 Houston*	No. 12	Alex Box Stadium • Baton Rouge, LA	W 5–2	6–4	
Feb 28	at No. 9 Long Beach State*	No. 14	Blair Field • Long Beach, CA	L 1–12	6–5	

March
Date	Opponent	Rank	Site/Stadium	Score	Overall Record	SEC Record
Mar 1	at No. 9 Long Beach State*	No. 14	Blair Field • Long Beach, CA	L 1–5	6–6	
Mar 2	at No. 9 Long Beach State*	No. 14	Blair Field • Long Beach, CA	W 7–2	7–6	
Mar 5	Southeastern Louisiana*	No. 18	Alex Box Stadium • Baton Rouge, LA	W 4–2	8–6	
Mar 7	Winthrop*	No. 18	Alex Box Stadium • Baton Rouge, LA	W 10–2	9–6	
Mar 8	Winthrop*	No. 18	Alex Box Stadium • Baton Rouge, LA	W 11–1	10–6	
Mar 9	Winthrop*	No. 18	Alex Box Stadium • Baton Rouge, LA	W 3–2	11–6	
Mar 11	vs No. 28 Tulane*	No. 18	Zephyr Field • Metairie, LA	L 4–5^{11}	11–7	
Mar 14	No. 16 Florida	No. 18	Alex Box Stadium • Baton Rouge, LA	W 9–0	12–7	1–0
Mar 15	No. 16 Florida	No. 18	Alex Box Stadium • Baton Rouge, LA	W 3–2	13–7	2–0
Mar 16	No. 16 Florida	No. 18	Alex Box Stadium • Baton Rouge, LA	T 8–8	13–7–1	2–0–1
Mar 21	at Georgia	No. 15	Foley Field • Athens, GA	W 12–5	14–7–1	3–0–1
Mar 22	at Georgia	No. 15	Foley Field • Athens, GA	W 13–6	15–7–1	4–0–1
Mar 23	at Georgia	No. 15	Foley Field • Athens, GA	W 3–2	16–7–1	5–0–1
Mar 25	vs New Orleans*	No. 12	Zephyr Field • Metairie, LA	L 4–5	16–8–1	
Mar 28	at No. 20 Alabama	No. 12	Sewell–Thomas Stadium • Tuscaloosa, AL	L 2–4	16–9–1	5–1–1
Mar 29	at No. 20 Alabama	No. 12	Sewell–Thomas Stadium • Tuscaloosa, AL	W 10–6	17–9–1	6–1–1
Mar 30	at No. 20 Alabama	No. 12	Sewell–Thomas Stadium • Tuscaloosa, AL	W 11–10	18–9–1	7–1–1

April
Date	Opponent	Rank	Site/Stadium	Score	Overall Record	SEC Record
Apr 2	Nicholls State*	No. 10	Alex Box Stadium • Baton Rouge, LA	W 6–2	19–9–1	
Apr 4	No. 22 South Carolina	No. 10	Alex Box Stadium • Baton Rouge, LA	W 5–1	20–9–1	8–1–1
Apr 5	No. 22 South Carolina	No. 10	Alex Box Stadium • Baton Rouge, LA	L 5–8	20–10–1	8–2–1
Apr 6	No. 22 South Carolina	No. 10	Alex Box Stadium • Baton Rouge, LA	W 12–4	21–10–1	9–2–1
Apr 9	at Northwestern State*	No. 8	H. Alvin Brown–C. C. Stroud Field • Natchitoches, LA	W 6–4	22–10–1	
Apr 11	Ole Miss	No. 8	Alex Box Stadium • Baton Rouge, LA	L 2–7	22–11–1	9–3–1
Apr 12	Ole Miss	No. 8	Alex Box Stadium • Baton Rouge, LA	W 14–6	23–11–1	10–3–1
Apr 13	Ole Miss	No. 8	Alex Box Stadium • Baton Rouge, LA	W 13–5	24–11–1	11–3–1
Apr 15	Tulane*	No. 7	Alex Box Stadium • Baton Rouge, LA	W 8–0	25–11–1	
Apr 18	at Vanderbilt	No. 7	Hawkins Field • Nashville, TN	L 2–4	25–12–1	11–4–1
Apr 19	at Vanderbilt	No. 7	Hawkins Field • Nashville, TN	L 4–5^{10}	25–13–1	11–5–1
Apr 20	at Vanderbilt	No. 7	Hawkins Field • Nashville, TN	W 9–2	26–13–1	12–5–1
Apr 23	Southeastern Louisiana*	No. 8	Alex Box Stadium • Baton Rouge, LA	W 14–8	27–13–1	
Apr 25	Tennessee	No. 8	Alex Box Stadium • Baton Rouge, LA	W 17–4	28–13–1	13–5–1
Apr 26	Tennessee	No. 8	Alex Box Stadium • Baton Rouge, LA	W 10–6	29–13–1	14–5–1
Apr 27	Tennessee	No. 8	Alex Box Stadium • Baton Rouge, LA	W 15–4	30–13–1	15–5–1
Apr 29	vs Tulane*	No. 6	Louisiana Superdome • New Orleans, LA	L 5–9	30–14–1	
Apr 30	New Orleans*	No. 6	Alex Box Stadium • Baton Rouge, LA	W 7–2	31–14–1	

May
Date	Opponent	Rank	Site/Stadium	Score	Overall Record	SEC Record
May 2	at No. 19 Mississippi State	No. 6	Dudy Noble Field, Polk–DeMent Stadium • Starkville, MS	L 2–4	31–15–1	15–6–1
May 3	at No. 19 Mississippi State	No. 6	Dudy Noble Field, Polk–DeMent Stadium • Starkville, MS	L 0–5	31–16–1	15–7–1
May 4	at No. 19 Mississippi State	No. 6	Dudy Noble Field, Polk–DeMent Stadium • Starkville, MS	W 6–1	32–16–1	16–7–1
May 6	Loyola New Orleans*	No. 8	Alex Box Stadium • Baton Rouge, LA	W 21–6^{8}	33–16–1	
May 9	No. 17 Auburn	No. 8	Alex Box Stadium • Baton Rouge, LA	W 6–5	34–16–1	17–7–1
May 10	No. 17 Auburn	No. 8	Alex Box Stadium • Baton Rouge, LA	W 20–3	35–16–1	18–7–1
May 11	No. 17 Auburn	No. 8	Alex Box Stadium • Baton Rouge, LA	L 8–14	35–17–1	18–8–1
May 16	at Arkansas	No. 8	Baum–Walker Stadium • Fayetteville, AR	W 11–3	36–17–1	19–8–1
May 17	at Arkansas	No. 8	Baum–Walker Stadium • Fayetteville, AR	L 5–2^{10}	36–18–1	19–9–1
May 18	at Arkansas	No. 8	Baum–Walker Stadium • Fayetteville, AR	W 6–2	37–18–1	20–9–1

Postseason

SEC Tournament
Date	Opponent	Rank (Seed)	Site/Stadium	Score	Overall Record	SECT Record
May 22	(8) Arkansas	No. 8 (1)	Hoover Metropolitan Stadium • Hoover, AL	W 5–4	38–18–1	1–0
May 23	No. 19 (4) Mississippi State	No. 8 (1)	Hoover Metropolitan Stadium • Hoover, AL	W 7–2	39–18–1	2–0
May 24	No. 19 (4) Mississippi State	No. 8 (1)	Hoover Metropolitan Stadium • Hoover, AL	W 17–5^{7}	40–18–1	3–0
May 25	(7) Alabama	No. 8 (1)	Hoover Metropolitan Stadium • Hoover, AL	L 3–10	40–19–1	3–1

NCAA Baton Rouge Regional
Date	Opponent	Rank (Seed)	Site/Stadium	Score	Overall Record	Reg Record
May 30	(4) Northeastern	No. 7 (1)	Alex Box Stadium • Baton Rouge, LA	W 11–8	41–19–1	1–0
May 31	No. 23 (2) Tulane	No. 7 (1)	Alex Box Stadium • Baton Rouge, LA	W 13–5	42–19–1	2–0
June 1	(3) UNC Wilmington	No. 7 (1)	Alex Box Stadium • Baton Rouge, LA	W 9–8^{11}	43–19–1	3–0

NCAA Baton Rouge Super Regional
Date	Opponent	Rank (Seed)	Site/Stadium	Score	Overall Record	SReg Record
June 6	No. 12 Baylor	No. 7 (2)	Alex Box Stadium • Baton Rouge, LA	L 1–4	43–20–1	0–1
June 7	No. 12 Baylor	No. 7 (2)	Alex Box Stadium • Baton Rouge, LA	W 6–5	44–20–1	1–1
June 8	No. 12 Baylor	No. 7 (2)	Alex Box Stadium • Baton Rouge, LA	W 20–5	45–20–1	2–1

College World Series
Date	Opponent	Rank (Seed)	Site/Stadium	Score	Overall Record	CWS Record
June 13	No. 2 (7) Cal State Fullerton	No. 4 (2)	Johnny Rosenblatt Stadium • Omaha, NE	L 2–8	45–21–1	0–1
June 15	No. 7 South Carolina	No. 4 (2)	Johnny Rosenblatt Stadium • Omaha, NE	L 10–11	45–22–1	0–2
