= 2004 Cal State Fullerton Titans baseball team =

American college baseball season

2004 Cal State Fullerton Titans baseball

College World Series champions Big West Conference champions
- Conference: Big West Conference

Ranking
- Coaches: No. 1
- CB: No. 1
- Record: 47–22 (19–2 Big West)
- Head coach: George Horton (8th year)
- Assistant coaches: Dave Serrano (8th year); Rick Vanderhook (18th year); Chad Baum (5th year)
- Home stadium: Goodwin Field

2004 Big West Conference baseball standings
	Conf.						Overall
Team	W		L		T	PCT	W		L		T	PCT
#1 Cal State Fullerton †^{y} ‍‍‍	19	–	2	–	0	.905	47	–	22	–	0	.681
No. 12 Long Beach State ‍‍‍	14	–	7	–	0	.667	40	–	21	–	0	.656
UC Riverside ‍‍‍	11	–	10	–	0	.524	33	–	24	–	0	.579
UC Irvine ‍‍‍	10	–	11	–	0	.476	34	–	23	–	1	.595
Cal Poly ‍‍‍	10	–	11	–	0	.476	38	–	23	–	1	.621
UC Santa Barbara ‍‍‍	10	–	11	–	0	.476	33	–	21	–	0	.611
Pacific ‍‍‍	5	–	16	–	0	.238	20	–	24	–	0	.455
Cal State Northridge ‍‍‍	5	–	16	–	0	.238	19	–	38	–	0	.333
† – Conference champion y – Invited to the 2004 NCAA Division I baseball tournament As of June 30, 2004; Rankings from Collegiate Baseball

The 2004 Cal State Fullerton Titans baseball team represented California State University, Fullerton in the 2004 NCAA Division I baseball season. The Titans played their home games at Goodwin Field. The team was coached by George Horton in his 8th season at Cal State Fullerton.

The Titans won the College World Series, defeating the Texas Longhorns and former Titans head coach Augie Garrido in the championship series.

== Roster ==
2004 Cal State Fullerton Titans roster
Pitchers: 10 Ricky Romero - Sophomore; 12 Mike Martinez - Senior; 17 Eric Hale - Freshman; 23 Scott Sarver - Junior; 26 Ryan Schreppel - Sophomore; 31 Armando Carrasco - Freshman; 33 Nolan Bruyninckx - Freshman; 34 Lauren Gagnier - Freshman; 37 Evan Myrick - Freshman; 38 Dustin Miller - Sophomore; 48 Geoff Tesmer - Freshman; 49 Jason Windsor - Senior; 50 John Estes - Sophomore; 51 Mark Davidson - Freshman; 53 Vinnie Pestano - Freshman	Infielders: 2 Justin Turner - Sophomore; 5 Mark Carroll - Junior; 6 Blake Davis - Freshman; 8 Bret Day - Senior; 9 Brett Pill - Freshman; 13 Neil Walton - Sophomore; 15 Ronnie Prettyman - Junior; 19 Evan McArthur - Sophomore; 25 Felipe Garcia - Junior; Catchers: 3 Kurt Suzuki - Junior; 32 Jon Wilhite - Freshman; 35 John Curtis - Freshman; 39 Vance Otake - Freshman; 43 Eric Echevarria - Sophomore; 44 P. J. Pilittere - Senior	Outfielders: 1 Joe Turgeon - Junior; 4 Clark Hardman - Freshman; 11 J.D. McCauley - Sophomore; 20 Brandon Tripp - Freshman; 22 Shawn Scobee - Sophomore; 24 Bobby Andrews - Sophomore; 27 Danny Dorn - Sophomore; 46 Sergio Pedroza - Sophomore; Coaches: 8 George Horton - 8th Season; 18 Dave Serrano - 8th Season; 28 Rick Vanderhook - 18th Season; 36 Chad Baum - 5th Season

== Schedule ==
2004 Cal State Fullerton Titans baseball game log
Regular season (36–20)
January (0–2)

Date	Opponent	Rank	Site/stadium	Score	Cal State Fullerton Decision	Attendance	Overall record	Big West record
January 30	at No. 6 Stanford	No. 8	Sunken Diamond	3–16	Schreppel (L; 0–1)	2,103	0–1	–
January 31	at No. 6 Stanford	No. 8	Sunken Diamond	7–8	Romero (L; 0–1)	2,437	0–2	–

February (8–6)

Date	Opponent	Rank	Site/stadium	Score	Cal State Fullerton Decision	Attendance	Overall record	Big West record
February 1	at No. 6 Stanford	No. 8	Sunken Diamond	1–4	Gagnier (L; 0–1)	1,637	0–3	–
February 6	UNLV	No. 8	Goodwin Field	9–8	Sarver (W; 1–0)	1,876	1–3	–
February 7	UNLV	No. 8	Goodwin Field	13–1	Romero (W; 1–1)	1,646	2–3	–
February 8	UNLV	No. 8	Goodwin Field	14–6	Gagnier (W; 1–1)	2,010	3–3	–
February 13	at No. 22 Arizona	No. 8	Sancet Stadium	8–11	Pestano (L; 0–1)	871	3–4	–
February 14	at No. 22 Arizona	No. 8	Sancet Stadium	6–10	Romero (L; 1–2)	1,358	3–5	–
February 15	at No. 22 Arizona	No. 8	Sancet Stadium	12–10	M. Martinez (W; 1–0)	1,683	4–5	–
February 20	at Houston	No. 15	Cougar Field	2–3	Windsor (L; 0–1)	1,203	4–6	–
February 21	at Houston	No. 15	Cougar Field	11–0	Romero (W; 2–2)	1,743	5–6	–
February 22	at Houston	No. 15	Cougar Field	9–4	Schreppel (W; 1–1)	1,513	6–6	–
February 24	at Loyola Marymount	No. 20	George C. Page Stadium	2–3	Sarver (L; 1–1)	321	6–7	–
February 27	Oklahoma	No. 20	Goodwin Field	1–5	Pestano (L; 0–2)	2,278	6–8	–
February 28	No. 3 Georgia Tech	No. 20	Goodwin Field	7–1	Romero (W; 3–2)	2,398	7–8	–
February 29	Southern California	No. 20	Goodwin Field	10–4	Gagnier (W; 2–1)	2,768	8–8	–

March (7–6)

Date	Opponent	Rank	Site/stadium	Score	Cal State Fullerton Decision	Attendance	Overall record	Big West record
March 5	at No. 3 Texas		Disch-Falk Field	2–6	Windsor (L; 0–2)	4,446	8–9	–
March 6	vs. Sam Houston State		Disch-Falk Field	12–2	Schreppel (W; 2–1)	278	9–9	–
March 7	at No. 3 Texas		Disch-Falk Field	1–3	Romero (L; 3–3)	5,547	9–10	–
March 9	vs. San Diego		Goodwin Field	4–7	Gagnier (L; 2–2)	821	9–11	–
March 12	Minnesota		Goodwin Field	7–1	Windsor (W; 1–2)	1,207	10–11	–
March 13	Minnesota		Goodwin Field	7–8	M. Martinez (L; 1–1)	1,413	10–12	–
March 14	Minnesota		Goodwin Field	10–2	Pestano (W; 1–2)	1,643	11–12	–
March 17	at Pepperdine		Eddy D. Field Stadium	9–8	M. Martinez (W; 2–1)	119	12–12	–
March 19	at Fresno State		Pete Beiden Field	5–7	Windsor (L; 1–3)	2,582	12–13	–
March 20	at Fresno State		Pete Beiden Field	15–5	Romero (W; 4–3)	2,408	13–13	–
March 21	at Fresno State		Pete Beiden Field	12–9	M. Martinez (W; 3–1)	2,423	14–13	–
March 24	Pepperdine		Goodwin Field	6–0	Bruyninckx (W; 1–0)	1,017	15–13	–
March 31	Southern California		Dedeaux Field	4–6	M. Martinez (L; 3–2)	551	15–14	–

April (11–4)

Date	Opponent	Rank	Site/stadium	Score	Cal State Fullerton Decision	Attendance	Overall record	Big West record
April 2	No. 13 Long Beach State		Goodwin Field	2–6	Windsor (L; 1–4)	3,317	15–15	–
April 3	No. 13 Long Beach State		Goodwin Field	1–10	Schreppel (L; 2–2)	1,859	15–16	–
April 4	No. 13 Long Beach State		Goodwin Field	9–3	Romero (W; 5–3)	2,585	16–16	–
April 8	at Pacific		Klein Family Field	16–1	Windsor (W; 2–4)	338	17–16	1–0
April 9	at Pacific		Klein Family Field	13–0	Romero (W; 6–3)	247	18–16	2–0
April 10	at Pacific		Klein Family Field	13–5	Pestano (W; 2–2)	331	19–16	3–0
April 13	Loyola Marymount		Goodwin Field	12–1	Schreppel (W; 3–2)	934	20–16	–
April 16	Cal State Northridge		Goodwin Field	3–2	Windsor (W; 3–4)	1,091	21–16	4–0
April 17	Cal State Northridge		Goodwin Field	10–3	Romero (W; 7–3)	1,010	22–16	5–0
April 18	Cal State Northridge		Goodwin Field	4–3	Pestano (W; 3–2)	1,874	23–16	6–0
April 20	UCLA		Goodwin Field	4–5	Pestano (L; 3–3)	l,479	23–17	–
April 23	at UC Santa Barbara		Caesar Uyesaka Stadium	8–0	Windsor (W; 4–4)	273	24–17	7–0
April 24	at UC Santa Barbara		Caesar Uyesaka Stadium	9–2	Romero (W; 8–3)	303	25–17	8–0
April 25	at UC Santa Barbara		Caesar Uyesaka Stadium	7–14	Sarver (L; 1–2)	371	25–18	8–1
April 30	Cal Poly		Goodwin Field	3–2	Windsor (W; 5–4)	1,243	26–18	9–1

May (10–2)

Date	Opponent	Rank	Site/stadium	Score	Cal State Fullerton Decision	Attendance	Overall record	Big West record
May 1	Cal Poly		Goodwin Field	27–2	Romero (W; 9–3)	1,579	27–18	10–1
May 2	Cal Poly		Goodwin Field	9–4	M. Martinez (W; 4–2)	1,127	28–18	11–1
May 7	UC Riverside		Goodwin Field	12–3	Windsor (W; 6–4)	1,632	29–18	12–1
May 8	UC Riverside		Goodwin Field	4–6	Romero (L; 9–4)	1,520	29–19	12–2
May 9	UC Riverside		Goodwin Field	11–4	M. Martinez (W; 5–2)	1,043	30–19	13–2
May 11	at UCLA		Jackie Robinson Stadium	2–8	Bruyninckx (L; 1–1)	327	30–20	–
May 14	at UC Irvine		Cicerone Field	3–0	Windsor (W; 7–4)	1,572	31–20	14–2
May 15	at UC Irvine		Cicerone Field	11–1	Romero (W; 10–4)	1,579	32–20	15–2
May 16	at UC Irvine		Cicerone Field	7–3	M. Martinez (W; 6–2)	1,610	33–20	16–2
May 21	at No. 11 Long Beach State	No. 23	Blair Field	2–1	Windsor (W; 8–4)	3,036	34–20	17–2
May 22	at No. 11 Long Beach State	No. 23	Blair Field	2–1	Romero (W; 11–4)	2,037	35–20	18–2
May 23	at No. 11 Long Beach State	No. 23	Blair Field	13–11	M. Martinez (W; 7–2)	2,168	36–20	19–2

Post-season (11–2)
NCAA tournament: Fullerton Regional (4–1)

Date	Opponent	Rank	Site/stadium	Score	Cal State Fullerton Decision	Attendance	Overall record
June 4	vs. (3) Minnesota	No. 13 (2)	Goodwin Field	7–1	Windsor (W; 9–4)	3,211	37–20
June 5	vs. (4) Pepperdine	No. 13 (2)	Goodwin Field	6–7	Schreppel (L; 3–3)	2,520	37–21
June 5	vs. No. 18 (1) Arizona State	No. 13 (2)	Goodwin Field	5–0	M. Martinez (W; 8–2)	1,392	38–21
June 6	vs. (4) Pepperdine	No. 13 (2)	Goodwin Field	15–1	Sarver (W; 2–2)	1,867	39–21
June 6	vs. (4) Pepperdine	No. 13 (2)	Goodwin Field	16–3	Windsor (W; 10–4)	1,567	40–21

NCAA tournament: Fullerton Super Regional (2–0)

Date	Opponent	Rank	Site/stadium	Score	Cal State Fullerton Decision	Attendance	Overall record
June 12	vs. No. 14 Tulane	No. 5	Goodwin Field	9–0	Windsor (W; 11–4)	3,375	41–21
June 13	vs. No. 14 Tulane	No. 5	Goodwin Field	10–7	Romero (W; 12–4)	2,720	42–21

NCAA tournament: College World Series (5–1)

Date	Opponent	Rank	Site/stadium	Score	Cal State Fullerton Decision	Attendance	Overall record
June 19	vs. No. 7 (2) South Carolina	No. 4	Rosenblatt Stadium	2–0	Windsor (W; 12–4)	23,976	43–21
June 20	vs. No. 1 (3) Miami (FL)	No. 4	Rosenblatt Stadium	6–3	Romero (W; 13–4)	24,857	44–21
June 23	vs. No. 7 (2) South Carolina	No. 4	Rosenblatt Stadium	3–5	M. Martinez (L; 8–3)	28,216	44–22
June 24	vs. No. 7 (2) South Carolina	No. 4	Rosenblatt Stadium	4–0	Sarver (W; 3–2)	16,251	45–22
June 26	vs. No. 2 (1) Texas	No. 4	Rosenblatt Stadium	6–4	Romero (W; 14–4)	26,604	46–22
June 27	vs. No. 2 (1) Texas	No. 4	Rosenblatt Stadium	3–2	Windsor (W; 13–4)	21,392	47–22

== Awards and honors ==
Felipe Garcia

- College World Series All-Tournament Team

Clark Hardman

- All-America Freshman
- All-Big West First Team

Ricky Romero

- College World Series All-Tournament Team

Kurt Suzuki

- Brooks Wallace Award
- Johnny Bench Award
- All-America First Team
- Big West Player of the Year
- All-Big West First Team

Jason Windsor

- College World Series Most Outstanding Player
- All-America Second Team
- Big West Pitcher of the Year
- All-Big West First Team

== Titans in the 2004 MLB draft ==
The following members of the Cal State Fullerton Titans baseball program were drafted in the 2004 Major League Baseball draft.

Player	Position	Round	Overall	MLB team
Kurt Suzuki	C	2nd	67th	Oakland Athletics
Jason Windsor	RHP	3rd	97th	Oakland Athletics
Mike Martinez	RHP	8th	249th	New York Yankees
P. J. Pilittere	C	13th	399th	New York Yankees
Ronnie Prettyman	3B	28th	826th	Seattle Mariners
Felipe Garcia	1B	48th	1437th	New York Yankees
Justin Turner	3B		undrafted	Los Angeles Dodgers
