= Chris Rahl =

American baseball player (born 1983)

- Outfielder
- Born: December 5, 1983 (age 42); Morristown, New Jersey, U.S.
- Bats: Right Throws: Right
- Stats at Baseball Reference

Christopher Miller Rahl (born December 5, 1983) is an American former baseball player who has spent his professional career in the minor leagues. In 2004, Rahl was named a First Team NCAA All-American by three of the four major selectors when he was a sophomore at the College of William & Mary.

== Early life ==
Rahl was born in Morristown, New Jersey but grew up in Chesapeake, Virginia. He attended Great Bridge High School where, in his senior year, he batted .465 with eight home runs, had 30 RBIs and 25 steals. He earned honorable mention all-state Group AAA honors for his performance.

== College ==
Rahl played college baseball not too far from his Virginia hometown at the College of William & Mary. He suited up for the Tribe in 2003 and 2004, while his best season came during his sophomore campaign in 2004. Rahl guided William & Mary to a school record 37 wins while setting numerous individual season team records along the way. According to a Tribe press release, Rahl set or tied records in "hits (89), total bases (175), stolen bases (42 in 46 attempts), and RBIs (70), and tied single season records in home runs (20), runs scored (73) and triples (8)." In each of the aforementioned categories he ranked in the national top 20.

At the end of the season, Rahl was honored as the Colonial Athletic Association (CAA) Player of the Year. He was the first William & Mary player to earn the award and was concurrently the league's first-ever sophomore honoree. No other player in CAA history had recorded 20 home runs and 40 stolen bases in the same season, either. Nationally, Rahl was recognized as consensus All-American by being selected by three of the four All-America selectors; the American Baseball Coaches Association, Collegiate Baseball, and the National Collegiate Baseball Writers Association all placed him on their First Team All-America selections.

== Professional ==
Rahl began playing professionally in the minor leagues in 2005. He was drafted in the fifth round of the 2005 MLB June Amateur Draft. He has spent time with several teams, and in 2009 was named an all-star in the Southern League. Three years later Rahl won the Eastern League All-Star Weekend home run derby. He signed a minor league deal with the Minnesota Twins on November 20, 2013. His final professional baseball season was in 2014 when he played for the Rochester Red Wings.

== Post-baseball life ==
In 2015, Rahl was an intern for the Tampa Bay Rays as where he scouted and did video systems management for their AAA Durham affiliate. He then moved on from baseball altogether and got into various professional sales roles in the Raleigh, North Carolina area ever since.
