= 2004 Arizona Wildcats baseball team =

American college baseball season

2004 Arizona Wildcats baseball

Long Beach Super Regional Champions South Bend Regional Champions

College World Series
- Conference: Pacific-10 Conference

Ranking
- Coaches: No. 7
- CB: No. 6
- Record: 36–27–1 (12–12 Pac-10)
- Head coach: Andy Lopez (3rd season)
- Assistant coach: Mark Wasikowski (3rd season)
- Hitting coach: Jeff Casper (3rd season)
- Pitching coach: Steve Kling (3rd season)
- Home stadium: Sancet Stadium

2004 Pacific-10 Conference baseball standings
	Conf.						Overall
Team	W		L		T	PCT	W		L		T	PCT
No. 9 Stanford ‍†‍‍^{y}	16	–	8	–	0	.667	46	–	14	–	0	.767
No. 21 Washington ‍‍‍^{y}	15	–	9	–	0	.625	39	–	20	–	1	.658
UCLA ‍‍‍^{y}	14	–	10	–	0	.583	35	–	29	–	0	.547
No. 23 Arizona State ‍‍‍^{y}	13	–	11	–	0	.542	41	–	18	–	0	.695
No. 6 Arizona ‍‍‍^{y}	12	–	12	–	0	.500	36	–	27	–	1	.570
Oregon State ‍‍‍	10	–	14	–	0	.417	31	–	22	–	0	.585
Southern California ‍‍‍	10	–	14	–	0	.417	24	–	32	–	0	.429
Washington State ‍‍‍	9	–	15	–	0	.375	29	–	26	–	0	.527
California ‍‍‍	9	–	15	–	0	.375	25	–	31	–	0	.446
† – Conference champion y – Invited to the NCAA tournament As of June 30, 2004; Rankings from Collegiate Baseball

The 2004 Arizona Wildcats baseball team represented the University of Arizona in the 2004 NCAA Division I baseball season. The Wildcats played their home games at Jerry Kindall Field at Frank Sancet Stadium. The team was coached by Andy Lopez in his third year at Arizona.

The Wildcats won the South Bend Regional and then Long Beach Super Regional to advance to the College World Series, where they were defeated by the Georgia Bulldogs.

== Personnel ==
=== Roster ===
2004 Arizona Wildcats roster
Pitchers • 20 - Tyler Tiedeman - Freshman • 21 - Chris Frey - Sophomore • 23 - Derek Rodriguez - Junior • 25 - Pat Lawler - Sophomore • 26 - Mark Melancon - Freshman • 27 - Koley Kolberg - Junior • 29 - Scott Burns - RS Senior • 30 - Sean Jarrett - Sophomore • 31 - Luis Cortez - RS Sophomore • 33 - Griffin Phillips - Freshman • 45 - Kevin Guyette - RS Sophomore • 46 - Brad Mills - Freshman • 47 - Donnie Veal - Freshman • 48 - Jon Meloan - Sophomore	Catchers • 11 - Richard Mercado - Junior • 13 - Nick Hundley - Sophomore Infielders • 1 - Brad Boyers - Sophomore • 2 - Lee Franklin - Sophomore • 3 - Moises Duran - Senior • 4 - Jason Donald - Freshman • 5 - Jordan Brown - Sophomore • 14 - Kurtis Goodin - Freshman • 17 - Pat Reilly - RS Junior • 22 - Zach Bies - Senior • 24 - Scott Lucas - Junior • 34 - John Hardy - Junior • 42 - Joe Frazier - Junior • 49 - Tyler Wicke - Freshman	Outfielders • 10 - Trevor Crowe - Sophomore • 15 - Bill Rhinehart - Freshman • 16 - Jeff Van Houten - Freshman • 18 - Terrence Taylor - Senior • 28 - Derek Decater - Sophomore • 35 - D.J. Lewis - Freshman

=== Coaches ===
2004 Arizona Wildcats baseball coaching staff
- Andy Lopez - Head coach
- Mark Wasikowski - Assistant coach
- Jeff Casper - Hitting Coach
- Steve Kling - Pitching Coach

=== Opening day ===
Opening Day Starters
Name	Position
Brad Boyer	Left fielder
Moises Duran	Third baseman
Jeff Van Houten	Right fielder
Trevor Crowe	Center fielder
Jordan Brown	First baseman
Nick Hundley	Catcher
Bill Rhinehart	Designated hitter
Jason Donald	Shortstop
John Hardy	Second baseman
Koley Kolberg	Starting pitcher

== Schedule and results ==
2004 Arizona Wildcats baseball game log
Regular season
Date	Opponent	Rank	Site/stadium	Score	Win/Loss	Overall Record	Pac-10 Record
Feb 6	UC Riverside	#22	Sancet Stadium • Tucson, AZ	W 6-5	Melancon (1-0)	1-0-0	
Feb 7	UC Riverside	#22	Sancet Stadium • Tucson, AZ	W 9-8	Meloan (1-0)	2-0-0	
Feb 8	UC Riverside	#22	Sancet Stadium • Tucson, AZ	W 10-7	Cortez (1-0)	3-0-0	
Feb 13	#8 Cal State Fullerton	#22	Sancet Stadium • Tucson, AZ	W 11-8	Melancon (2-0)	4-0-0	
Feb 14	#8 Cal State Fullerton	#22	Sancet Stadium • Tucson, AZ	W 10-6	Guyette (1-0)	5-0-0	
Feb 15	#8 Cal State Fullerton	#22	Sancet Stadium • Tucson, AZ	L 10-12	Melancon (2-1)	5-1-0	
Feb 20	UC Irvine	#14	Sancet Stadium • Tucson, AZ	L 1-3	Kolberg (0-1)	5-2-0	
Feb 21	UC Irvine	#14	Sancet Stadium • Tucson, AZ	L 5-6	Guyette (1-1)	5-3-0	
Feb 22	UC Irvine	#14	Sancet Stadium • Tucson, AZ	T 8-8	None	5-3-1	
Feb 24	at #7 Arizona State	#19	Packard Stadium • Tempe, AZ	L 0-4	Guyette (1-2)	5-4-1	
Feb 27	at Baylor	#19	Baylor Ballpark • Waco, TX	W 2-1	Kolberg (1-1)	6-4-1	
Feb 28	at Baylor	#19	Baylor Ballpark • Waco, TX	L 2-10	Cortez (1-1)	6-5-1	
Feb 28	at Baylor	#19	Baylor Ballpark • Waco, TX	W 5-3	Melancon (3-1)	7-5-1	
Mar 6	Sacramento State		Sancet Stadium • Tucson, AZ	L 8-9	Melancon (3-2)	7-6-1	
Mar 6	Sacramento State		Sancet Stadium • Tucson, AZ	W 5-2	Cortez (2-1)	8-6-1	
Mar 7	Sacramento State		Sancet Stadium • Tucson, AZ	W 11-6	Guyette (2-2)	9-6-1	
Mar 11	vs TCU		Dell Diamond • Round Rock, TX	W 5-2	Kolberg (2-1)	10-6-1	
Mar 12	vs #8 Notre Dame		Dell Diamond • Round Rock, TX	L 2-4	Burns (0-1)	10-7-1	
Mar 13	vs Penn State		Dell Diamond • Round Rock, TX	W 10-1	Guyette (3-2)	11-7-1	
Mar 18	at #15 Long Beach State		Blair Field • Long Beach, CA	L 0-4	Kolberg (2-2)	11-8-1	
Mar 19	at #15 Long Beach State		Blair Field • Long Beach, CA	L 2-10	Cortez (2-2)	11-9-1	
Mar 20	at #15 Long Beach State		Blair Field • Long Beach, CA	L 2-4	Guyette (3-3)	11-10-1	
Mar 26	Washington State		Sancet Stadium • Tucson, AZ	W 8-7	Kolberg (3-2)	12-10-1	1-0
Mar 27	Washington State		Sancet Stadium • Tucson, AZ	L 4-10	Cortez (2-3)	12-11-1	1-1
Mar 28	Washington State		Sancet Stadium • Tucson, AZ	W 11-3	Guyette (4-3)	13-11-1	2-1
Apr 2	at Oregon State		Goss Stadium • Corvallis, OR	W 4-3	Kolberg (4-2)	14-11-1	3-1
Apr 3	at Oregon State		Goss Stadium • Corvallis, OR	W 14-7	Melancon (4-2)	15-11-1	4-1
Apr 4	at Oregon State		Goss Stadium • Corvallis, OR	L 5-6	Rodriguez (0-1)	15-12-1	4-2
Apr 8	UCLA		Sancet Stadium • Tucson, AZ	L 7-9	Melancon (4-3)	15-13-1	4-3
Apr 9	UCLA		Sancet Stadium • Tucson, AZ	L 3-4	Guyette (4-4)	15-14-1	4-4
Apr 10	UCLA		Sancet Stadium • Tucson, AZ	W 9-5	Meloan (2-0)	16-14-1	5-4
Apr 12	at Arizona State		Packard Stadium • Tempe, AZ	L 5-9	Mills (0-1)	16-15-1	
Apr 13	at UNLV		Earl Wilson Stadium • Paradise, NV	W 11-2	Kolberg (5-2)	17-15-1	
Apr 14	at UNLV		Earl Wilson Stadium • Paradise, NV	W 10-9	Cortez (3-3)	18-15-1	
Apr 16	Texas-Pan American		Sancet Stadium • Tucson, AZ	W 12-5	Meloan (3-0)	19-15-1	
Apr 17	Texas-Pan American		Sancet Stadium • Tucson, AZ	W 9-4	Kolberg (6-2)	20-15-1	
Apr 18	Texas-Pan American		Sancet Stadium • Tucson, AZ	W 5-2	Guyette (5-4)	21-15-1	
Apr 23	at Washington		Husky Ballpark • Seattle, WA	L 1-6	Kolberg (6-3)	21-16-1	5-5
Apr 24	at Washington		Husky Ballpark • Seattle, WA	L 6-7	Melancon (4-4)	21-17-1	5-6
Apr 25	at Washington		Husky Ballpark • Seattle, WA	L 11-12	Rodriguez (0-2)	21-18-1	5-7
Apr 30	at California		Evans Diamond • Berkeley, CA	W 5-3	Kolberg (7-3)	22-18-1	6-7
May 1	at California		Evans Diamond • Berkeley, CA	L 8-10	Guyette (5-5)	22-19-1	6-8
May 2	at California		Evans Diamond • Berkeley, CA	W 8-3	Meloan (4-0)	23-19-1	7-8
May 7	at UCLA		Jackie Robinson Stadium • Los Angeles, CA	L 3-7	Kolberg (7-4)	23-20-1	
May 8	at UCLA		Jackie Robinson Stadium • Los Angeles, CA	W 20-9	Guyette (6-5)	24-20-1	
May 9	at UCLA		Jackie Robinson Stadium • Los Angeles, CA	W 11-2	Meloan (5-0)	25-20-1	
May 15	#2 Stanford		Sancet Stadium • Tucson, AZ	L 9-11	Kolberg (7-5)	25-21-1	7-9
May 16	#2 Stanford		Sancet Stadium • Tucson, AZ	W 19-18	Rodriguez (1-2)	26-21-1	8-9
May 17	#2 Stanford		Sancet Stadium • Tucson, AZ	W 11-2	Meloan (6-0)	27-21-1	9-9
May 21	#17 Arizona State		Sancet Stadium • Tucson, AZ	L 3-8	Kolberg (7-6)	27-22-1	9-10
May 22	#17 Arizona State		Sancet Stadium • Tucson, AZ	L 2-7	Guyette (6-6)	27-23-1	9-11
May 23	#17 Arizona State		Sancet Stadium • Tucson, AZ	W 13-7	Meloan (7-0)	28-23-1	10-11
May 28	at USC		Dedeaux Field • Los Angeles, CA	W 7-6	Kolberg (8-6)	29-23-1	11-11
May 29	at USC		Dedeaux Field • Los Angeles, CA	L 8-9	Rodriguez (1-3)	29-24-1	11-12
May 30	at USC		Dedeaux Field • Los Angeles, CA	W 7-6	Meloan (8-0)	30-24-1	12-12
NCAA South Bend Regional
Jun 4	vs (2) UC Irvine	(3)	Frank Eck Stadium • South Bend, IN	W 7-3	Kolberg (9-6)	31-24-1	
Jun 5	vs (4) Kent State	(3)	Frank Eck Stadium • South Bend, IN	W 7-4	Melancon (5-4)	32-24-1	
Jun 6	at (1) #6 Notre Dame	(3)	Frank Eck Stadium • South Bend, IN	W 7-6	Meloan (9-0)	33-24-1	
NCAA Long Beach Super Regional
Jun 11	at #6 Long Beach State	#18	Blair Field • Long Beach, CA	W 6-5	Burns (1-1)	34-24-1	
Jun 12	at #6 Long Beach State	#18	Blair Field • Long Beach, CA	L 4-9	Guyette (6-7)	34-25-1	
Jun 13	at #6 Long Beach State	#18	Blair Field • Long Beach, CA	W 4-3	Melancon (6-4)	35-25-1	
College World Series
Jun 18	vs #5 Georgia	#8	Johnny Rosenblatt Stadium • Omaha, NE	L 7-8	Kolberg (9-7)	35-26-1	
Jun 20	vs #3 Arkansas	#8	Johnny Rosenblatt Stadium • Omaha, NE	W 7-2	Meloan (10-0)	36-26-1	
Jun 22	vs #5 Georgia	#8	Johnny Rosenblatt Stadium • Omaha, NE	L 1-3	Guyette (6-8)	36-27-1	

=== South Bend Regional ===
South Bend Regional Teams
(1) Notre Dame Fighting Irish	(4) Kent State Golden Flashes	(2) UC Irvine Anteaters	(3) Arizona Wildcats

=== Long Beach Super Regional ===
Long Beach Super Regional Teams
Long Beach State Dirtbags	vs.	Arizona Wildcats

== College World Series ==
2004 College World Series Teams
Arizona Wildcats	Georgia Bulldogs	(8) Arkansas Razorbacks	(1) Texas Longhorns	Cal State Fullerton Titans	(2) South Carolina Gamecocks	LSU Tigers	(3) Miami Hurricanes

First round
Arizona	7
Georgia	8
8	Arkansas	2
1	Texas	13
Arizona	7
8	Arkansas	2
Cal State Fullerton	2
2	South Carolina	0
LSU	5
3	Miami (FL)	9
2	South Carolina	15
LSU	4

Second round
Georgia	3
1	Texas	9
Georgia	3
Arizona	1
Cal State Fullerton	6
3	Miami (FL)	3
3	Miami (FL)	11
2	South Carolina	15

Semifinals
1	Texas	7	—
Georgia	6	—
Cal State Fullerton	3	4
2	South Carolina	5	0

Finals
1	Texas	4	2	—
Cal State Fullerton	6	3	—

== Awards and honors ==
Jason Donald

- Second Team Freshman All-American Baseball America
- First Team Freshman All-American Collegiate Baseball

Trevor Crowe

- First Team All-Pac-10
- College World Series All-Tournament Team

== 2004 MLB draft ==
Player	Position	Round	Overall	MLB team
Koley Kolberg	RHP	7	206	Arizona Diamondbacks
John Hardy	2B	7	212	Philadelphia Phillies
Richard Mercado	C	12	356	Arizona Diamondbacks
