= Wally Kincaid =

Wally Kincaid (c. 1926 – November 16, 2015) was a college baseball coach. He coached the baseball team at Cerritos College from 1958 through 1980. He was inducted in the National College Baseball Hall of Fame in 2010.

== Biography ==
Kincaid attended Downey High School and Whittier College. He was named head coach of the baseball program at Cerritos, a community college that competes in the South Coast Conference of the California Community College Athletic Association, upon its inception in 1958. Kincaid led the Cerritos baseball team to a 678–163 win–loss record, 15 conference championships, and six state titles. He retired as the winningest coach in junior college history. He trained successful coaches, including George Horton, Dave Serrano, Don Sneddon, Dave Snow, Mike Weathers, Ken Gaylord, and Bob Apodaca.

Cerritos renamed their baseball field after Kincaid upon his retirement in 1980. Baseball America, a baseball magazine, named Kincaid the National Community College Baseball Coach of the Century. A tournament, called the Wally Kincaid 4 July Wood Bat Series, began in 2008. He was inducted in the National College Baseball Hall of Fame in 2010. He died on November 16, 2015, at the age of 89.
