= 2004 NCAA Division II baseball tournament =

- Season: 2004
- Finals site: Montgomery Riverwalk Stadium; Montgomery, Alabama
- Champions: Delta State (1st title)
- Runner-up: Grand Valley State (1st CWS Appearance)
- Winning coach: Mike Kinnison (1st title)
- MOP: Bert Pickard, 1B (Delta State)
- Attendance: 18,184

The 2004 NCAA Division II baseball tournament was the postseason tournament hosted by the NCAA to determine the national champion of baseball among its Division II members at the end of the 2004 NCAA Division II baseball season.

The final, eight-team double elimination tournament, also known as the College World Series, was played at Montgomery Riverwalk Stadium in Montgomery, Alabama from May 22–29, 20034. After nineteen seasons at Montgomery's Paterson Field, the tournament finals moved to the city's new Riverwalk Stadium, which had recently opened as the new home of the minor league Montgomery Biscuits of the Double-A Southern League.

Delta State defeated Grand Valley State in the championship game, 12–8, to clai m the Statesmen's first Division II national title.

== Bracket ==
=== College World Series ===
First Rounds; May 22–25, 2004	Second Rounds; May 24–26, 2004
Bryant	11
Rollins	3
Bryant	2
Grand Valley State	5
Grand Valley State	2
Chico State	1
Bracket One
Rollins	10
Chico State	3
Columbus State	10
Rollins	11
Columbus State	10
Kutztown	8
Columbus State	5
Delta State	14
Central Missouri State	5
Delta State	6
Bracket Two
Kutztown	3
Central Missouri State	7
Bryant	3
Central Missouri State	14

Semifinals; May 27–28, 2004
Grand Valley State	11
Rollins	4
Delta State	9	10
Central Missouri State	12	9

Championship; May 29, 2004
Grand Valley State	8
Delta State	12

== See also ==
- 2004 NCAA Division I baseball tournament
- 2004 NCAA Division III baseball tournament
- 2004 NAIA World Series
