= P. J. Pilittere =

American baseball coach (born 1981)

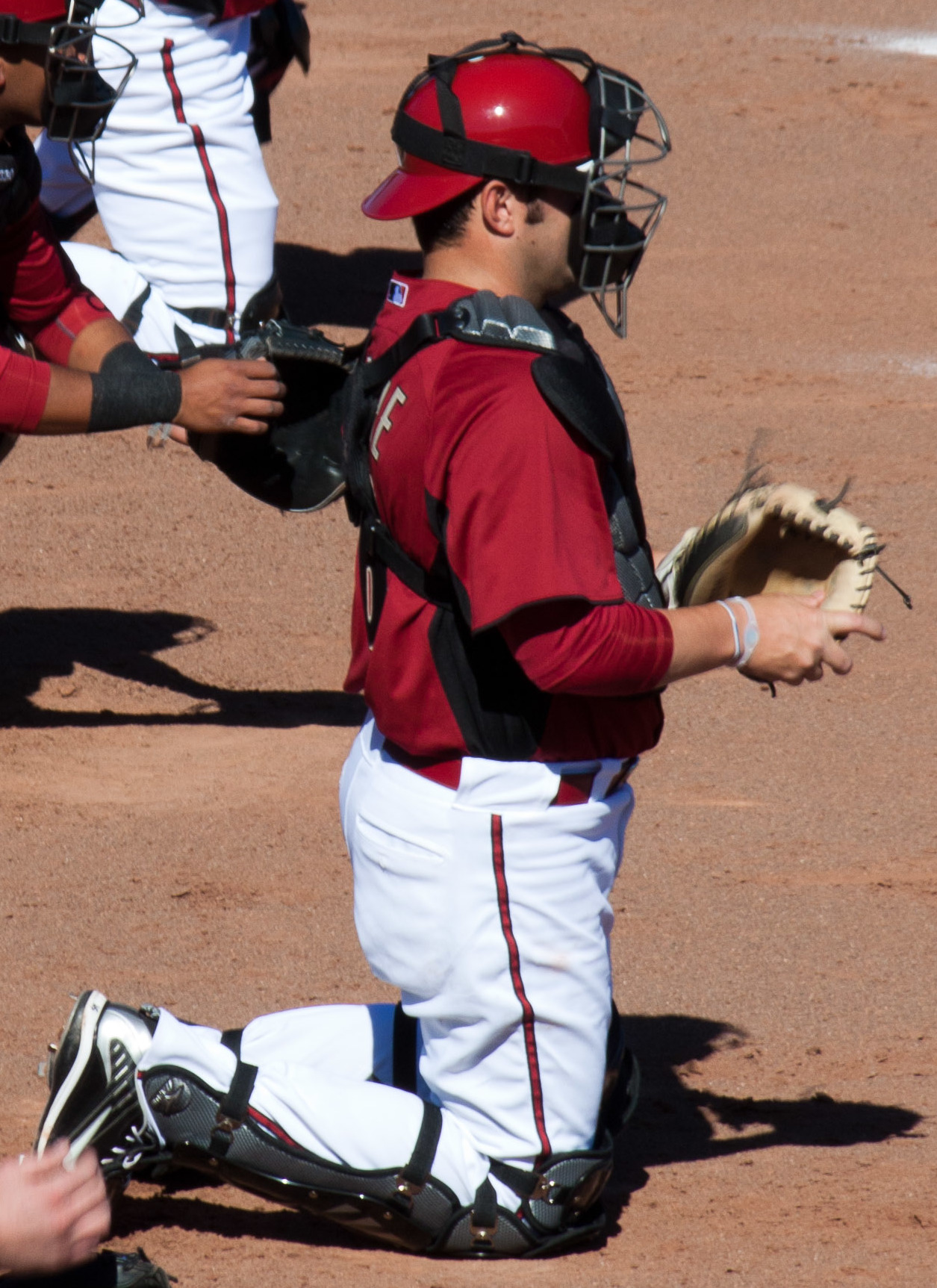
- Pilittere with the Arizona Diamondbacks during spring training in 2011
- Coach
- Born: November 23, 1981 (age 44); San Dimas, California, U.S.
- Bats: Right Throws: Right
- Stats at Baseball Reference

Teams
- As coach: New York Yankees (2018–2021); Colorado Rockies (2022–2024)

Peter John Pilittere (born November 23, 1981) is an American professional baseball coach. He has previously served as the assistant hitting coach for the New York Yankees and Colorado Rockies of Major League Baseball (MLB).

== Career ==
=== Playing career ===
Pilittere graduated from Bishop Amat High School in La Puente, California. He enrolled at California State University, Fullerton to play college baseball for the Cal State Fullerton Titans, where was a member of their 2004 College World Series championship team. The New York Yankees selected Pilittere in the 13th round of the 2004 Major League Baseball draft. He played in the Yankees' organization until 2011, when he retired after playing in 470 games across eight seasons.

=== Coaching career ===
In 2012, Pilittere became a coach with the Gulf Coast Yankees. The Yankees promoted him to serve as the hitting coach for the Charleston RiverDogs of the Single–A South Atlantic League for the 2013 season, the 2014 season with the Tampa Yankees of the High–A, and the 2015 and 2016 seasons with the Trenton Thunder of the Double–A Eastern League. In 2017, he coached for the Scranton/Wilkes-Barre RailRiders of the Triple–A International League.

Prior to the 2018 season, the Yankees named Pilittere their assistant hitting coach at the major league level. The Yankees opted not to retain Pilittere after the 2021 season.

The Colorado Rockies hired Pilittere as their assistant hitting coach on December 14, 2021. On October 8, 2024, Pilittere and the Rockies parted ways.
