= Smoke Laval =

American college baseball coach (born 1955)

Biographical details
- Born: December 20, 1955 (age 70); McDonald, Pennsylvania, U.S.

Playing career
- 1974–1975: Gulf Coast CC
- 1976–1977: Jacksonville
- Position: Catcher

Coaching career (HC unless noted)
- 1977: Jacksonville (Asst.)
- 1978: Wolfson High School (Asst.)
- 1979: LSU (Asst.)
- 1980–1981: Gulf Coast CC (Asst.)
- 1982–1983: Florida (Asst.)
- 1984–1993: LSU (Asst.)
- 1994–2000: Louisiana–Monroe
- 2001: LSU (Adm. Asst.)
- 2002–2006: LSU
- 2007–2010: Toronto Blue Jays (scout)
- 2011–2017: North Florida

Head coaching record
- Overall: 688–428–1
- Tournaments: 17–17

Accomplishments and honors

Championships
- 1995 SLC Tournament championship 1999 SLC Championship; 2000 SLC Championship; 2003 SEC Championship; 2015 A-Sun Championship

Awards
- 1995 LSWA Coach of the Year; 1999 SLC Coach of the Year; 2002 LSWA Coach of the Year; 2003 SEC Coach of the Year; 2003 LSWA Coach of the Year; 2004 LSWA Coach of the Year; 2015 A-Sun Coach of the Year

Raymond Peter "Smoke" Laval (born December 20, 1955) is an American college baseball coach who was the head coach of the University of North Florida Ospreys. He is a former head coach of the Louisiana State University Tigers and the University of Louisiana at Monroe Indians baseball teams. He has led his teams to two College World Series, five conference championships, and seven NCAA Division I Baseball Championship appearances, and has received a number of coaching awards.

== Early life and career ==
Laval was born in McDonald, Pennsylvania. He enrolled at Gulf Coast Community College in 1974, where he played catcher on the college baseball team. He transferred to Jacksonville University in 1976, playing for the Jacksonville Dolphins baseball team.

After college he served in a variety of assistant coaching positions at Jacksonville, Wolfson High School, Louisiana State University, Gulf Coast Community College, and the University of Florida from 1977 to 1983. In 1984 he took a longer term assistant position with the LSU Tigers baseball team under the legendary coach Skip Bertman. During that time the LSU program became one of the best in the nation winning two National Championships (1991 & 1993). As a result of the success at LSU, Laval was offered the head coaching position at nearby University of Louisiana at Monroe in 1993.

== Head coaching career ==
=== Northeast Louisiana/Louisiana–Monroe ===
Laval became head coach of the Northeast Louisiana Indians (now the Louisiana–Monroe Warhawks) for the 1994 season. Laval led the team to a 241–159 (.603) record, two NCAA tournament appearances, three Southland Conference regular season championships (1996, 1999, and 2000) and one Southland Conference tournament championship (1995). As a result of this success he attracted the attention of LSU in the wake of Skip Bertman's impending retirement.

=== LSU ===
LSU hired Laval as an administrative assistant for the baseball team under Bertman in 2001, with the intention of promoting him to head coach succeeding Bertman. Bertman retired at the end of that season having won five national championships and Laval took over head coaching duties in 2002. Expectations were high for the new coach, as one would expect following a legend like Bertman.

In 2002 Laval led the Tigers to a 44–22 record and an appearance in a Super Regional in his first season. Things got even better in 2003, Laval's second season, as he led the team to a 45–22–1 record and their first Southeastern Conference regular season championship since 1997. He was named the 2003 SEC Coach of the Year. He also led the team to an appearance in the College World Series as the #2 national seed. However, the Tigers went home after two straight losses.

2004 saw the Tigers compile a 46–19 record and included a return trip to the College World Series. Like the prior year, LSU went 0–2 in the CWS and was eliminated. LSU fans were not used to going winless in Omaha, leading to questions about Laval's ability to maintain the program's elite status. The 2005 Tigers struggled during the regular season but still managed to compile a 40–22 record. The team lost in the first round of the NCAA tournament and did not make an appearance in a Super Regional for the first time ever (Super Regionals began in 1999).

Although Laval's first four years were fairly solid, they were below Tiger fans had come to expect. He began feeling pressure from LSU fans and the athletic administration, and it was generally felt that 2006 would be a make-or-break season for him. Unfortunately for Laval, the Tigers had their worst season since 1983, the year before Bertman arrived. The team finished the season with a record of 35–24 and its first losing SEC record in 24 years. They missed the NCAA tournament for the first time in 18 years. Under pressure, Laval officially resigned on June 4, 2006. He finished his career at LSU with a record of 210–109–1 (.658) in five seasons. Notre Dame coach Paul Mainieri was hired to replace him.

Following his resignation, Laval worked as a scouting adviser for the Toronto Blue Jays.

=== North Florida ===
In 2009, the University of North Florida announced that Laval would succeed Hall of Fame coach Dusty Rhodes as head coach of the Ospreys upon Rhodes' retirement. He took over prior to the 2011 season, becoming the second baseball coach in the school's history. He led the team to its first Atlantic Sun Conference regular season championship in 2015 and was named Atlantic Sun Conference coach of the year that season. Laval was removed as head coach after the 2017 season.

=== Yearly record ===
Below is a table of Laval's yearly records as an NCAA head baseball coach.

Record table
Season	Team	Overall	Conference	Standing	Postseason
Northeast Louisiana/Louisiana–Monroe (Southland Conference) (1994–2000)
1994	Northeast Louisiana	20–33	6–18	9th	
1995	Northeast Louisiana	37–20	16–7	3rd	NCAA Regional
1996	Northeast Louisiana	41–19	21–9	1st (Louisiana)	
1997	Northeast Louisiana	33–21	17–11	2nd (Louisiana)	
1998	Northeast Louisiana	33–22	13–9	2nd	
1999	Northeast Louisiana	36–22	19–7	1st	NCAA Regional
2000	Louisiana–Monroe	41–22	20–7	T–1st	NCAA Regional
NELA/ULM:		241–159 (.603)	112–68 (.622)		
LSU (Southeastern Conference) (2002–2006)
2002	LSU	44–22	19–10	2nd (West)	NCAA Super Regional
2003	LSU	45–22–1	20–9–1	1st (West)	College World Series
2004	LSU	46–19	18–12	T–2nd (West)	College World Series
2005	LSU	40–22	18–12	T–1st (West)	NCAA Regional
2006	LSU	35–24	13–17	4th (West)	
LSU:		210–109–1 (.658)	88–60–1 (.594)		
North Florida (Atlantic Sun Conference) (2011–present)
2011	North Florida	27–27	13–17	8th	
2012	North Florida	31–24	12–15	8th	
2013	North Florida	40–19	18–9	3rd	
2014	North Florida	22–31	11–16	8th	
2015	North Florida	45–16	16–5	1st	
2016	North Florida	39–19	15–6	2nd	
2017	North Florida	33–24	12–9	4th	
North Florida:		237–160 (.597)	97–77 (.557)		
Total:		688–428–1 (.590)			
National champion Postseason invitational champion Conference regular season champion Conference regular season and conference tournament champion Division regular season champion Division regular season and conference tournament champion Conference tournament champion

== Coaching honors ==
- 1995 Louisiana Sportswriters Association Coach of the Year
- 1999 Southland Conference Coach of the Year
- 2002 Louisiana Sportswriters Association Coach of the Year
- 2003 SEC Coach of the Year; Louisiana Sportswriters Association Coach of the Year
- 2004 Louisiana Sportswriters Association Coach of the Year
- 2015 Atlantic Sun Conference Coach of the Year

== See also ==
- List of current NCAA Division I baseball coaches
