= George Horton (baseball) =

American baseball coach (born 1953)

Biographical details
- Born: October 5, 1953 (age 73); Downey, California, U.S.
- Education: Cal State Fullerton

Coaching career (HC unless noted)
- 1976–1977: Cerritos College (Asst.)
- 1978–1980: LA Valley College (Asst.)
- 1980–1985: Cerritos College (Asst.)
- 1985–1990: Cerritos College
- 1991–1996: Cal State Fullerton (Asst.)
- 1997–2007: Cal State Fullerton
- 2009–2019: Oregon

Head coaching record
- Overall: 865–493–2

Accomplishments and honors

Championships
- 2004 College World Series

George Edward Horton (born October 5, 1953) is an American college baseball coach. He was head coach of the Oregon Ducks baseball and Cal State Fullerton Titans baseball programs.

== Playing career ==
Horton was born and raised in Downey, California and graduated from Downey High School in 1971. He played on the Cerritos College baseball team in 1972 and 1973 under coach Wally Kincaid. Horton then played two seasons under head coach Augie Garrido at Cal State Fullerton in 1975 and 1976. He was on the Fullerton team that made the school's first appearance in the College World Series in 1975.

== Coaching career ==
Horton began his coaching career the same place he began his collegiate playing career, Cerritos College. He coached there for two seasons before moving onto Los Angeles Valley College. From there he went back to Cerritos College as an assistant before eventually becoming the head coach. He was later hired by his former coach, Augie Garrido, to be an assistant at Cal State Fullerton. When Garrido left in 1996, Horton was hired to replace him.

In 2003, Horton was named 2003 National Coach of the Year by Baseball America.

In 2004, Horton would face off against his old boss in the 2004 College World Series championship series. The Fullerton Titans won the series and the national championship.

In September 2007, Horton was named the head coach of the University of Oregon, which reinstated its baseball program starting in the 2009 season after being a club sport since 1982. In his first season at the helm of the Ducks the team was 14–42.

In 2010, Horton led the Ducks to the NCAA Division I baseball Tournament for the first time since 1964. The 2010 Ducks baseball team finished the season with a 40–24 overall record. On May 28, 2019, Horton and Oregon mutually agreed to part ways.

== Head coaching record ==
Record table
Season	Team	Overall	Conference	Standing	Postseason
Cal State Fullerton Titans (Big West Conference) (1997–2007)
1997	Cal State Fullerton	39–24–1	21–9	2nd (Southern)	NCAA Regional
1998	Cal State Fullerton	47–17	25–5	1st (Southern)	NCAA Regional
1999	Cal State Fullerton	50–14	25–5	1st	College World Series
2000	Cal State Fullerton	38–21	21–9	T–1st	NCAA Regional
2001	Cal State Fullerton	48–18	14–4	1st	College World Series
2002	Cal State Fullerton	37–22	14–10	T–4th	NCAA Regional
2003	Cal State Fullerton	50–16	15–6	2nd	College World Series
2004	Cal State Fullerton	47–22	19–2	1st	College World Series champions
2005	Cal State Fullerton	46–18	16–5	1st	NCAA Super Regional
2006	Cal State Fullerton	50–15	18–3	1st	College World Series
2007	Cal State Fullerton	38–25	10–11	5th	College World Series
Cal State Fullerton:		490–212–1 (.698)	198–69 (.742)		
Oregon Ducks (Pac-12 Conference) (2009–2019)
2009	Oregon	14–42	4–23	10th	
2010	Oregon	40–24	13–14	T–5th	NCAA Regional
2011	Oregon	33–26–1	11–16	8th	
2012	Oregon	46–19	19–11	3rd	NCAA Super Regional
2013	Oregon	48–16	22–8	2nd	NCAA Regional
2014	Oregon	44–20	18–12	4th	NCAA Regional
2015	Oregon	38–25	16–14	6th	NCAA Regional
2016	Oregon	29–26	14–16	T–8th	
2017	Oregon	30–25	12–18	8th	
2018	Oregon	26–29	12–18	9th	
2019	Oregon	27–29	10–19	9th	
Oregon:		375–281–1 (.572)	151–169 (.472)		
Total:		865–493–2 (.637)			
National champion Postseason invitational champion Conference regular season champion Conference regular season and conference tournament champion Division regular season champion Division regular season and conference tournament champion Conference tournament champion
