= 2004 NCAA Division I baseball tournament =

American college sports championship

- Season: 2004
- Teams: 64
- Finals site: Johnny Rosenblatt Stadium; Omaha, Nebraska
- Champions: Cal State Fullerton (4th title)
- Runner-up: Texas (31st CWS Appearance)
- Winning coach: George Horton (1st title)
- MOP: Jason Windsor (Cal State Fullerton)
- Attendance: 256,730

The 2004 NCAA Division I baseball tournament was held from June 4 through June 27, 2004. Sixty-four NCAA Division I college baseball teams met after having played their way through a regular season, and for some, a conference tournament, to play in the NCAA tournament. The tournament culminates with 8 teams in the College World Series at historic Rosenblatt Stadium in Omaha, Nebraska.

In the 58th College World Series and the 55th series held in Omaha, the Cal State Fullerton Titans rode the arm of Jason Windsor, named the Series' Most Outstanding Player, to prevail over the field and claim the 2004 National Championship. The Titans won Bracket II with a 3–1 record and went on to sweep Bracket I winner Texas in two games to claim the title. Windsor picked up two complete game victories and a save, and threw more than 300 pitches in the series. Ricky Romero also recorded two wins for the Titans.

== Bids ==
=== Automatic bids ===
Conference champions from 30 Division I conferences earned automatic bids to regionals. The remaining 34 spots were awarded to schools as at-large invitees.

Conference	School	Berty type
America East	Stony Brook	Tournament champion
ACC	Florida State	Tournament champion
Atlantic Sun	Florida Atlantic	Tournament champion
A-10	St. Bonaventure	Tournament champion
Big 12	Oklahoma State	Tournament champion
Big East	Notre Dame	Tournament champion
Big South	Coastal Carolina	Tournament champion
Big Ten	Minnesota	Tournament champion
Big West	Cal State Fullerton	Regular-season champion
CAA	UNC Wilmington	Tournament champion
Conference USA	TCU	Tournament champion
Horizon League	Youngstown State	Tournament champion
Ivy League	Princeton	Championship series winner
MAAC	Le Moyne	Tournament champion
MAC	Kent State	Tournament champion
Mid-Con	Oral Roberts	Tournament champion
MEAC	Bethune-Cookman	Tournament champion
Missouri Valley	Wichita State	Tournament champion
MWC	UNLV	Tournament champion
NEC	Central Connecticut	Tournament champion
OVC	Jacksonville State	Tournament champion
Pac-10	Stanford	Regular-season champion
Patriot League	Army	Tournament champion
SEC	South Carolina	Tournament champion
SoCon	The Citadel	Tournament champion
Southland	Lamar	Tournament champion
SWAC	Texas Southern	Tournament champion
Sun Belt	Western Kentucky	Tournament champion
WAC	Rice	Regular-season champion
WCC	Pepperdine	Championship series winner

=== Bids by conference ===
Conference	Total	Schools
Southeastern	9	Arkansas, Florida, Georgia, LSU, Mississippi State, Ole Miss, South Carolina, Tennessee, Vanderbilt
Atlantic Coast	6	Clemson, Florida State, Georgia Tech, North Carolina, NC State, Virginia
Big 12	6	Missouri, Oklahoma, Oklahoma State, Texas, Texas A&M, Texas Tech
Pacific-10	5	Arizona, Arizona State, Stanford, UCLA, Washington
Conference USA	4	East Carolina, Southern Miss, TCU, Tulane
Big West	3	Cal State Fullerton, Long Beach State, UC Irvine
Atlantic Sun	2	UCF, Florida Atlantic
Big East	2	Notre Dame, St. John's
Big South	2	Birmingham–Southern, Coastal Carolina
Colonial Athletic	2	George Mason, UNC Wilmington
Southern	2	The Citadel, College of Charleston
Sun Belt	2	Middle Tennessee, Western Kentucky
America East	1	Stony Brook
Atlantic 10	1	St. Bonaventure
Big Ten	1	Minnesota
Horizon	1	Youngstown State
Independent	1	Miami (FL)
Ivy	1	Princeton
Metro Atlantic	1	Le Moyne
Mid-American	1	Kent State
Mid-Continent	1	Oral Roberts
Mid-Eastern	1	Bethune-Cookman
Missouri Valley	1	Wichita State
Mountain West	1	UNLV
Northeast	1	Central Connecticut
Ohio Valley	1	Jacksonville State
Patriot	1	Army
Southland	1	Lamar
Southwestern Athletic	1	Texas Southern
Western Athletic	1	Rice
West Coast	1	Pepperdine

== Tournament notes ==
- Birmingham–Southern, UC Irvine, College of Charleston, Jacksonville St., St. Bonaventure, Stony Brook, Texas Southern, and Youngstown St. were making their first NCAA tournament appearance.

=== College World Series notes ===
- Four of the eight teams are members of the Southeastern Conference; the conference tied its own record set in 1997 when Alabama, Auburn, LSU, and Mississippi State participated.
- South Carolina and Texas made their third consecutive appearance in Omaha; the Longhorns defeated the Gamecocks in the 2002 national championship game, the last year the bracket winners played one winner-take-all game.
- Cal State Fullerton, Miami, and LSU were also included in last year's CWS field.
- Last year's champion and runner-up, Rice and Stanford, did not make it past Sub-Regional play; 2004 was the first time in six years that Stanford has not made it to Omaha.
- The 2004 participants combined for 110 CWS appearances and 21 Championships; only Arkansas and South Carolina had yet to win a title.
- The 2004 participants had won 10 of the last 14 national titles.

=== CWS records tied or broken ===
- Most appearances in one CWS by a pitcher: five by Texas' J. B. Cox, the 10th time that has happened.
- Most CWS games finished by a relief pitcher in a career: nine by Texas' Huston Street (2001–03), tying the mark set by Miami's Rick Raether (1985–86).
- Largest single-game attendance: 28,216 on June 23 for the South Carolina-Cal State Fullerton game.

== National seeds ==
Bold indicates CWS participant.

1. **Texas**
2. **South Carolina**
3. **Miami (FL)**
4. Georgia Tech
5. Stanford
6. Rice
7. Arizona State
8. **Arkansas**

== Regionals and super regionals ==
Bold indicates winner.

=== Austin Super Regional ===
First round	Second round
1	**Texas**	**10**
4	Youngstown State	3
1	**Texas**	**7**
2	Oral Roberts	5
3	TCU	5
2	**Oral Roberts**	**6**
Austin Regional – Disch–Falk Field
4	Youngstown State	8
3	**TCU**	**12**
3	TCU	1
2	**Oral Roberts**	**10**
1	Virginia	2
4	**Princeton**	**4**
4	Princeton	1
2	**Vanderbilt**	**11**
3	George Mason	3
2	**Vanderbilt**	**7**
Charlottesville Regional – Davenport Field
1	**Virginia**	**7**
3	George Mason	2
1	**Virginia**	**9**
4	Princeton	0

Regional finals
1	**Texas**	**7**	—
2	Oral Roberts	3	—
2	**Vanderbilt**	**7**	—
1	Virginia	3	—

Super regionals
1	**Texas**	**15**	**10**	—
Vanderbilt	3	2	—

=== Columbia Super Regional ===
First round	Second round
1	**South Carolina**	**12**
4	The Citadel	4
1	**South Carolina**	**5**
2	North Carolina	2
3	Coastal Carolina	5
2	**North Carolina**	**6**
Columbia Regional – Sarge Frye Field
4	**The Citadel**	**10**
3	Coastal Carolina	1
4	The Citadel	3
2	**North Carolina**	**6**
1	**East Carolina**	**8**
4	Stony Brook	1
1	**East Carolina**	**11**
3	UNC Wilmington	4
3	**UNC Wilmington**	**8**
2	Tennessee	5
Kinston Regional – Grainger Stadium
4	Stony Brook	0
2	**Tennessee**	**1**
2	Tennessee	3
3	**UNC Wilmington**	**4**

Regional finals
1	**South Carolina**	**7**	—
2	North Carolina	6	—
1	**East Carolina**	**7**	—
3	UNC Wilmington	0	—

Super regionals
2	**South Carolina**	**4**	**5**	—
East Carolina	2	3	—

=== Coral Gables Super Regional ===
First round	Second round
1	**Miami (FL)**	**6**
4	St. Bonaventure	3
1	**Miami (FL)**	**19**
2	NC State	5
3	Florida Atlantic	5
2	**NC State**	**6**
Coral Gables Regional – Mark Light Field
4	St. Bonaventure	2
3	**Florida Atlantic**	**14**
3	**Florida Atlantic**	**10**
2	NC State	2
1	**Florida**	**12**
4	Central Connecticut	1
1	**Florida**	**4**
3	UCLA	3
3	**UCLA**	**9**
2	Oklahoma	1
Oklahoma City Regional – Bricktown Ballpark
4	Central Connecticut	1
2	**Oklahoma**	**6**
2	Oklahoma	7
3	**UCLA**	**17**

Regional finals
1	**Miami (FL)**	**19**	—
3	Florida Atlantic	6	—
1	**Florida**	**11**	—
3	UCLA	0	—

Super regionals
3	**Miami (FL)**	**8**	**3**	—
Florida	7	1	—

=== Atlanta Super Regional ===
First round	Second round
1	**Georgia Tech**	**16**
4	Jacksonville State	3
1	**Georgia Tech**	**9**
2	Texas Tech	3
3	Mississippi State	6
2	**Texas Tech**	**10**
Atlanta Regional – Russ Chandler Stadium
4	Jacksonville State	6
3	**Mississippi State**	**7**
3	Mississippi State	7
2	**Texas Tech**	**14**
1	**Georgia**	**16**
4	Middle Tennessee	2
1	**Georgia**	**6**
2	Clemson	3
3	Birmingham-Southern	6
2	**Clemson**	**10**
Athens Regional – Foley Field
4	Middle Tennessee	0
3	**Birmingham-Southern**	**5**
3	Birmingham-Southern	4
2	**Clemson**	**5**

Regional finals
1	**Georgia Tech**	**5**	—
2	Texas Tech	3	—
1	**Georgia**	9	**7**
2	Clemson	**10**	6

Super regionals
4	Georgia Tech	5	3	—
**Georgia**	**7**	**5**	—

=== Long Beach Super Regional ===
Hosted by Long Beach State at Blair Field.

First round	Second round
1	**Stanford**	**10**
4	UNLV	4
1	Stanford	4
2	**Long Beach State**	**7**
3	St. John's	3
2	**Long Beach State**	**4**
Palo Alto Regional – Sunken Diamond
4	UNLV	4
3	**St. John's**	**9**
3	St. John's	2
1	**Stanford**	**7**
1	Notre Dame	1
4	**Kent State**	**2**
4	Kent State	4
3	**Arizona**	**7**
3	**Arizona**	**7**
2	UC Irvine	3
South Bend Regional – Frank Eck Stadium
1	**Notre Dame**	**6**
2	UC Irvine	5
1	**Notre Dame**	**7**
4	Kent State	1

Regional finals
2	**Long Beach State**	**8**	—
1	Stanford	4	—
3	**Arizona**	**7**	—
1	Notre Dame	6	—

Super regionals
Long Beach State	5	**9**	3
**Arizona**	**6**	4	**4**^{11}

=== Baton Rouge Super Regional ===
First round	Second round
1	Rice	3
4	**Texas Southern**	**4**
4	Texas Southern	1
2	**Texas A&M**	**12**
3	Lamar	3
2	**Texas A&M**	**14**
Houston Regional – Reckling Park
1	**Rice**	**6**
3	Lamar	3
1	**Rice**	**7**
4	Texas Southern	1
1	**LSU**	**9**
4	Army	0
1	**LSU**	**6**
2	Southern Miss	2
3	College of Charleston	5
2	**Southern Miss**	**6**
Baton Rouge Regional – Alex Box Stadium
4	Army	1
3	**College of Charleston**	**2**
3	**College of Charleston**	**7**
2	Southern Miss	3

Regional finals
2	**Texas A&M**	1	**7**
1	Rice	**3**	5
1	**LSU**	**11**	—
3	College of Charleston	3	—

Super regionals
Texas A&M	8	0	—
**LSU**	**11**	**4**	—

=== Fullerton Super Regional ===
First round	Second round
1	Arizona State	5
4	**Pepperdine**	**15**
4	**Pepperdine**	**7**
2	Cal State Fullerton	6
3	Minnesota	1
2	**Cal State Fullerton**	**7**
Fullerton Regional – Goodwin Field
1	**Arizona State**	**6**
3	Minnesota	4
1	Arizona State	0
2	**Cal State Fullerton**	**5**
1	Ole Miss	0
4	**Western Kentucky**	**1**
4	Western Kentucky	0
3	**Tulane**	**7**
3	**Tulane**	**3**
2	Washington	2
Oxford Regional – Swayze Field
1	Ole Miss	2
2	**Washington**	**7**
2	**Washington**	**4**
4	Western Kentucky	1

Regional finals
4	Pepperdine	1	3
2	**Cal State Fullerton**	**15**	**16**
3	**Tulane**	**12**	—
2	Washington	3	—

Super regionals
**Cal State Fullerton**	**9**	**10**	—
Tulane	0	7	—

=== Fayetteville Super Regional ===
First round	Second round
1	**Arkansas**	**4**
4	Le Moyne	1
1	Arkansas	3
2	**Wichita State**	**4**
3	Missouri	0
2	**Wichita State**	**3**
Fayetteville Regional – Baum Stadium
4	Le Moyne	3
3	**Missouri**	**11**
3	Missouri	7
1	**Arkansas**	**10**
1	**Florida State**	**10**
4	Bethune-Cookman	3
1	**Florida State**	**3**
3	UCF	2
3	**UCF**	**7**
2	Oklahoma State	3
Tallahassee Regional – Dick Howser Stadium
4	Bethune-Cookman	1
2	**Oklahoma State**	**4**
2	Oklahoma State	9
3	**UCF**	**12**

Regional finals
2	Wichita State	9	3
1	**Arkansas**	**11**	**4**
1	**Florida State**	5	**19**
3	UCF	**7**	3

Super regionals
8	**Arkansas**	**7**	**4**	—
Florida State	5	2	—

== College World Series ==
=== Participants ===
School	Conference	Record (conference)	Head coach	CWS appearances	Best CWS finish	CWS record Not including this year
Arizona	Pac-10	35–25–1 (12–12)	Andy Lopez	14 (last: 1986)	1st (1976, 1980, 1986)	32–25
Arkansas	SEC	45–22 (19–11)	Dave Van Horn	4 (last: 1989)	2nd (1979)	7–8
Cal State Fullerton	Big West	42–21 (19–2)	George Horton	12 (last: 2003)	1st (1979, 1984, 1995)	27–20
Georgia	SEC	43–21 (19–11)	David Perno	3 (last: 2001)	1st (1990)	4–5
LSU	SEC	46–17 (18–12)	Smoke Laval	12 (last: 2003)	1st (1991, 1993, 1996, 1997, 2000)	29–15
Miami (FL)	n/a	49–11 (n/a)	Jim Morris	20 (last: 2003)	1st (1982, 1985, 1999, 2001)	44–32
South Carolina	SEC	50–15 (17–13)	Ray Tanner	7 (last: 2003)	2nd (1975, 1977, 2002)	14–14
Texas	Big 12	55–13 (19–7)	Augie Garrido	30 (last: 2003)	1st (1949, 1950, 1975, 1983, 2002)	70–51

=== Bracket ===
First round
Arizona	7
**Georgia**	**8**
8	Arkansas	2
1	**Texas**	**13**
**Arizona**	**7**
8	Arkansas	2
**Cal State Fullerton**	**2**
2	South Carolina	0
LSU	5
3	**Miami (FL)**	**9**
2	**South Carolina**	**15**
LSU	4

Second round
Georgia	3
1	**Texas**	**9**
**Georgia**	**3**
Arizona	1
**Cal State Fullerton**	**6**
3	Miami (FL)	3
3	Miami (FL)	11
2	**South Carolina**	**15**

Semifinals
1	**Texas**	**7**	—
Georgia	6	—
**Cal State Fullerton**	3	**4**
2	South Carolina	**5**	0

Finals
1	Texas	4	2	—
**Cal State Fullerton**	**6**	**3**	—

=== Championship series ===
==== Saturday 6/26 Game #1 ====
Team	1	2	3	4	5	6	7	8	9	R	H	E
Cal State Fullerton	3	0	0	0	0	0	3	0	0	**6**	**10**	**2**
Texas	0	1	0	0	3	0	0	0	0	**4**	**8**	**3**
WP: Ricky Romero LP: J. Brent Cox Sv: Mike Martinez; Attendance: 26,604

==== Sunday 6/27 Game #2 ====
Team	1	2	3	4	5	6	7	8	9	R	H	E
Texas	2	0	0	0	0	0	0	0	0	**2**	**4**	**3**
Cal State Fullerton	0	0	0	0	0	0	3	0	X	**3**	**8**	**1**
WP: Jason Windsor LP: Buck Cody; Attendance: 21,392; Notes: Cal State Fullerton wins National Title

=== All-Tournament Team ===
The following players were members of the College World Series All-Tournament Team.

Position	Player	School
P	**Jason Windsor (MOP)**	Cal State Fullerton
P	Ricky Romero	Cal State Fullerton
C	Landon Powell	South Carolina
1B	Steve Pearce	South Carolina
2B	Seth Johnston	Texas
3B	Bryan Triplett	South Carolina
SS	Roger Tomas	Miami (FL)
OF	Jon Jay	Miami (FL)
OF	Trevor Crowe	Arizona
OF	Brian Barton	Miami (FL)
DH	Felipe Garcia	Cal State Fullerton

== See also ==
- 2004 NCAA Division II baseball tournament
- 2004 NCAA Division III baseball tournament
- 2004 NAIA World Series
