= 2003 Southeastern Conference baseball tournament =

- Teams: 8
- Format: Two pools of four-team double elimination
- Finals site: Hoover Metropolitan Stadium; Hoover, Alabama
- Champions: Alabama (7th title)
- Winning coach: Jim Wells (6th title)
- MVP: Beau Hearod (Alabama)
- Attendance: 122,393

2003 Southeastern Conference baseball standings
	Conf.				Overall
Team	W		L	PCT	W		L	PCT
Eastern
No. 6 South Carolina ^{x}‍‍‍^{y}	19	–	11	.633	42	–	20	.677
Vanderbilt ‍‍‍	14	–	16	.467	27	–	28	.491
Florida ‍‍‍^{y}	13	–	16	.448	37	–	21	.638
Tennessee ‍‍‍	13	–	17	.433	31	–	24	.564
Georgia ‍‍‍	10	–	20	.333	29	–	26	.527
Kentucky ‍‍‍	9	–	20	.310	24	–	32	.429
Western
No. 7 LSU ^{x}‍†‍‍^{y}	20	–	9	.690	45	–	22	.672
No. 20 Auburn ‍‍‍^{y}	18	–	12	.600	42	–	21	.667
No. 24 Mississippi State ‍‍‍^{y}	17	–	12	.586	42	–	20	.677
Ole Miss ‍‍‍^{y}	17	–	13	.567	35	–	27	.565
Alabama ‍‍‡‍^{y}	14	–	16	.467	38	–	24	.613
Arkansas ‍‍‍^{y}	14	–	16	.467	35	–	22	.614
x – Division champion † – Conference champion ‡ – Tournament champion y – Invited to the NCAA tournament As of June 30, 2003; Rankings from Collegiate Baseball

The 2003 Southeastern Conference baseball tournament was held at Hoover Metropolitan Stadium in Hoover, AL from May 21 through 25. Alabama won the tournament and earned the Southeastern Conference's automatic bid to the 2003 NCAA tournament.

== Regular season Results ==
Eastern Division
Team	W	L	Pct	GB	Seed
South Carolina	19	11	.633	--	2
Vanderbilt	14	16	.467	5	6
Florida	13	16	.448	5.5	--
Tennessee	13	17	.433	6	--
Georgia	10	20	.333	9	--
Kentucky	9	20	.310	9.5	--

Western Division
Team	W	L	Pct	GB	Seed
LSU	20	9	.690	--	1
Auburn	18	12	.600	2.5	3
Mississippi State	17	12	.586	3	4
Ole Miss	17	13	.567	3.5	5
Alabama	14	16	.467	6.5	7
Arkansas	14	16	.467	6	8

== Tournament ==
First round
6	Vanderbilt	1
3	Auburn	3
7	Alabama	9
2	South Carolina	7
6	Vanderbilt	2
2	South Carolina	3
5	Ole Miss	4*
4	Mississippi State	5*
8	Arkansas	4
1	LSU	5
5	Ole Miss	8*
8	Arkansas	7*

Second round
3	Auburn	5
7	Alabama	7
2	South Carolina	1
3	Auburn	5
4	Mississippi State	2
1	LSU	7
5	Ole Miss	1
4	Mississippi State	4

Semifinals
7	Alabama	13	-
3	Auburn	3	-
1	LSU	17~	-
4	Mississippi State	5~	-

Finals
7	Alabama	10
1	LSU	3

- * indicates extra innings.
- ~ Game was shortened by 10-run rule.
- Florida, Tennessee, Georgia and Kentucky did not make the tournament.
- The first day of the tournament was postponed by rain after the completion of the Vanderbilt-Auburn first-round game.

== All-Tournament Team ==
Position	Player	School
1B	Zac Welch	Alabama
2B	Thomas Berkery	Mississippi State
3B	Steve Gendron	Mississippi State
SS	Aaron Hill	LSU
C	Bobby Huddleston	Auburn
OF	Javon Moran	Auburn
OF	Nick Pitts	Arkansas
OF	Beau Hearod	Alabama
DH	Adam Pavkovich	Alabama
P	Arnold Hughey	Aurburn
P	Jamie Gant	Mississippi State
MVP	Beau Hearod	Alabama

== See also ==
- College World Series
- NCAA Division I Baseball Championship
- Southeastern Conference baseball tournament
