= Jason Windsor =

American baseball player (born 1982)

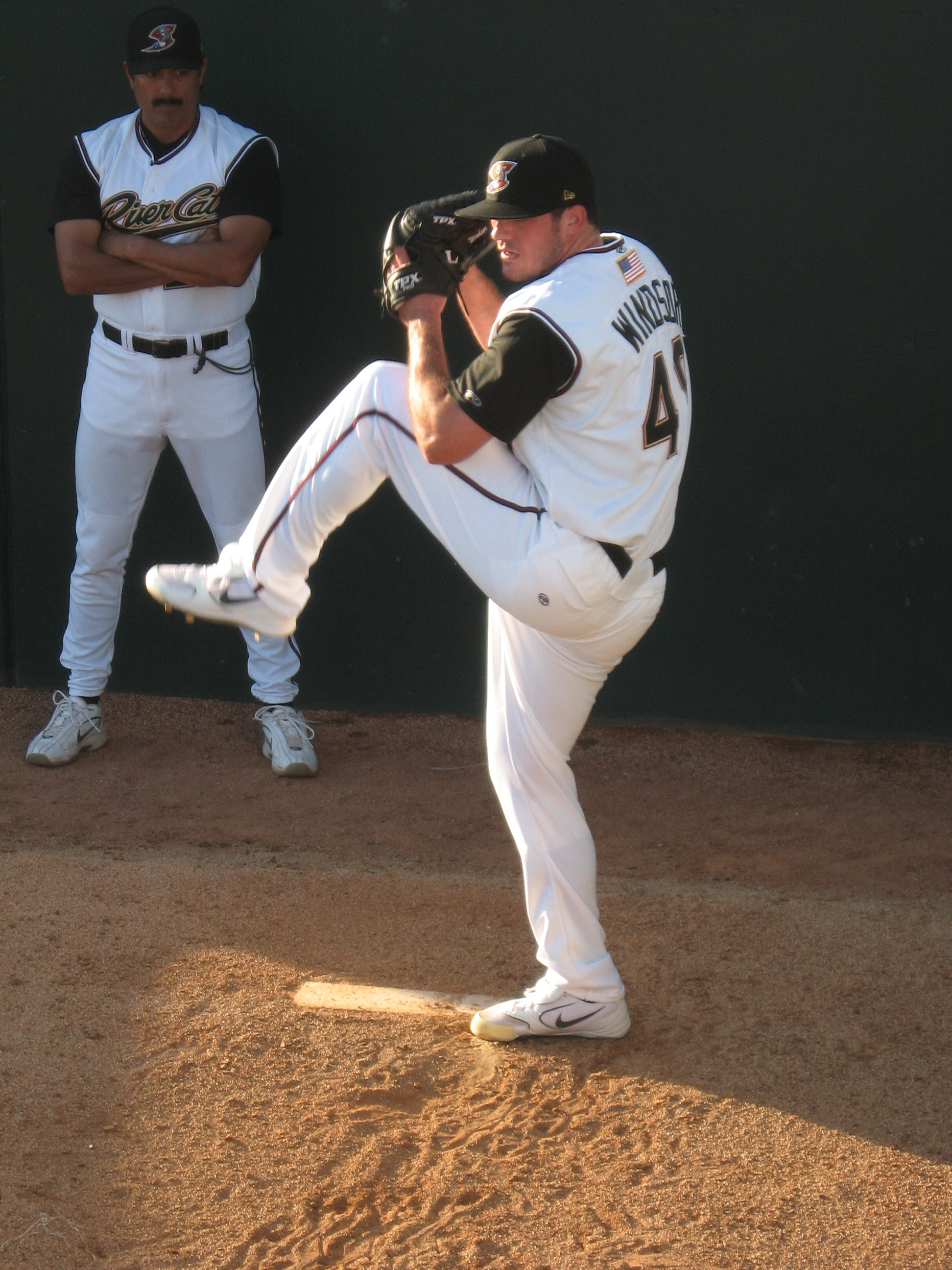
- Pitcher
- Born: July 16, 1982 (age 43); San Bernardino, California, U.S.
- Batted: Right Threw: Right

MLB debut
- July 17, 2006, for the Oakland Athletics

Last MLB appearance
- September 27, 2006, for the Oakland Athletics

MLB statistics
- Win–loss record: 0-1
- Earned run average: 6.59
- Strikeouts: 6
- Stats at Baseball Reference

Teams
- Oakland Athletics (2006)

Jason David Windsor (born July 16, 1982) is an American former professional baseball pitcher. A right-hander, he appeared in four games in Major League Baseball (MLB) for the Oakland Athletics in 2006.

== Early life ==
Windsor attended Leigh High School in San Jose, California. In 2000, he helped lead Leigh High School a to CCS Championship in a close win over St. Ignatius.

== Amateur career ==
Windsor is best known for winning the Most Outstanding Player award in the 2004 College World Series, pitching for the Cal State Fullerton Titans. The Titans upset Texas, with Windsor pitching a complete game 5-hitter to go along with 10 strikeouts in the final. He finished his senior season with a 13–4 record and a 1.72 ERA.

== Professional career ==
The Oakland Athletics selected Windsor in the third round, with the 97th overall selection, of the 2004 Major League Baseball draft. Windsor appeared in just 13 games the rest of 2004, all in relief for Vancouver and Kane County. He got off to a promising start for Stockton in 2005, posting a 3.58 ERA in 10 starts. He was called up and did not fare well, putting up a 5.72 ERA in 11 starts for AA Midland. A shoulder injury shortened his season.

Windsor bounced back in 2006 going 4-1 with a 2.97 ERA for Midland, and was soon promoted to AAA Sacramento. The success continued as he had a perfect 8-0 record in 12 starts. A 12–1 record at the All-Star break was good enough to receive a promotion to the A's on July 17.

Windsor made his MLB debut on July 17, 2006, against the Baltimore Orioles. He pitched five innings, giving up three runs and failing to get a decision. He started again on July 25, but only lasted 2.2 innings, giving up four runs on nine hits and taking the loss, the only decision of his career. He was sent back to the minor leagues shortly thereafter, returning in September to make two more appearances.

Windsor returned to Sacramento in 2007, but appeared in only 10 games. He then missed most of the 2008 season while recovering from surgery to repair a torn labrum in his right shoulder. He participated in minor league camp with the A's in 2009, but was let go and never pitched professionally again.
