= 2004 NCAA Division I baseball season =

Baseball season

- Duration: January 16 – June 27, 2004
- Number of teams: 288

Tournament
- Duration: June 4 – 27, 2004
- Most conference bids: SEC (9)

College World Series
- Duration: June 18 – 27, 2004
- Champions: Cal State Fullerton (4th title)
- Runners-up: Texas (31st CWS Appearance)
- Winning coach: George Horton (1st title)
- MOP: Jason Windsor (Cal State Fullerton)

Seasons
- ← 2003 2005 →

The 2004 NCAA Division I baseball season play of college baseball in the United States, organized by the National Collegiate Athletic Association (NCAA) at the Division I level, began on January 16, 2004. The season progressed through the regular season, many conference tournaments and championship series, and concluded with the 2004 NCAA Division I baseball tournament and 2004 College World Series. The College World Series, which consisted of the eight remaining teams in the NCAA tournament, was held in its annual location of Omaha, Nebraska, at Rosenblatt Stadium. It concluded on June 27, 2004, with the final game of the best of three championship series. Cal State Fullerton defeated Texas two games to none to claim its fourth championship.

== Realignment ==
=== New programs ===
Three programs joined Division I for the 2004 season. Dallas Baptist and Northern Colorado joined from Division II, while Utah Valley joined from the NJCAA.

=== Dropped programs ===
Two programs left Division I prior to the start of the season– Drexel, which dropped its varsity baseball program, and Morris Brown, which discontinued its varsity athletics program.

=== Conference changes ===
Both the Ohio Valley Conference (OVC) and the Big South Conference (Big South) added two teams entering the season. The OVC added Jacksonville State and Samford, both from the Atlantic Sun Conference (A-Sun). The Big South added Birmingham–Southern, an independent, and VMI, a former Southern Conference (SoCon) member. To compensate for these moves, the A-Sun added Lipscomb, an independent, and the SoCon added Elon from the Big South.

Two other schools realigned prior to the start of the season. UMBC moved from the Northeast Conference to the America East Conference, and Centenary moved from being an independent to the Mid-Continent Conference.

=== Conference formats ===
Both the Colonial Athletic Association, which had competed in American and Colonial divisions, and the Mid-Eastern Athletic Conference, which had competed in North and South divisions, eliminated their divisional formats.

== Conference standings ==
America East Conference
	Conf			Overall		
Team	W	L	Pct	W	L	Pct
Northeastern	14	6	.700	28	20	.583
Albany	14	7	.667	37	14	.725
Maine	14	7	.667	34	21	.618
Stony Brook	11	10	.524	29	27	.518
Vermont	10	11	.476	18	26	.409
Binghamton	9	11	.450	22	21	.512
UMBC	6	15	.286	14	38	.269
Hartford	5	16	.238	11	33	.250

Atlantic Coast Conference
	Conf			Overall		
Team	W	L	Pct	W	L	Pct
Georgia Tech	18	5	.783	44	21	.677
Virginia	18	6	.750	44	15	.746
Florida State	16	8	.667	45	23	.662
North Carolina	14	10	.583	43	21	.672
Clemson	14	10	.583	39	26	.446
North Carolina State	11	12	.478	36	24	.600
Duke	8	16	.333	25	31	.446
Maryland	4	20	.167	22	34	.393
Wake Forest	4	20	.167	17	33	.340

Atlantic Sun Conference
	Conf			Overall		
Team	W	L	Pct	W	L	Pct
Central Florida	24	6	.800	47	18	.723
Florida Atlantic	20	10	.667	47	17	.734
Stetson	20	10	.667	36	23	.610
Gardner–Webb	19	11	.633	32	25	.561
Troy	15	15	.500	36	22	.621
Campbell	14	16	.467	23	34	.404
Belmont	13	17	.433	31	23	.574
Jacksonville	12	18	.400	25	31	.446
Georgia State	11	19	.367	18	36	.333
Lipscomb	9	21	.300	15	39	.278
Mercer	8	22	.267	20	35	.364

Atlantic 10 Conference
	Conf			Overall		
Team	W	L	Pct	W	L	Pct
East
Rhode Island	20	4	.833	35	20	.636
St. Bonaventure	14	7	.667	29	22	.569
Fordham	13	11	.542	25	27	.481
Temple	10	14	.417	23	26	.469
Massachusetts	10	14	.417	19	26	.422
Saint Joseph's	4	20	.167	10	44	.185
West
George Washington	19	5	.792	41	18	.695
Richmond	17	7	.708	33	24	.579
Duquesne	11	10	.524	21	28	.429
Dayton	11	13	.458	25	28	.472
Xavier	7	17	.292	16	38	.296
La Salle	5	19	.208	20	28	.417

Big East Conference
	Conf			Overall		
Team	W	L	Pct	W	L	Pct
Notre Dame	20	6	.769	51	12	.810
Pittsburgh	17	9	.654	38	18	.679
St. John's	17	9	.654	37	23	.617
Boston College	15	9	.625	32	27	.542
Rutgers	13	11	.542	30	23	.567
Villanova	11	14	.440	31	20	.608
Virginia Tech	11	15	.423	29	27	.518
West Virginia	10	16	.385	23	29	.442
Connecticut	9	17	.346	26	29	.473
Seton Hall	9	17	.346	17	33	.340
Georgetown	8	17	.320	25	30	.455

Big South Conference
	Conf			Overall		
Team	W	L	Pct	W	L	Pct
Birmingham–Southern	21	3	.875	47	18	.723
Coastal Carolina	16	8	.667	40	23	.635
Winthrop	16	8	.667	37	23	.617
Radford	14	10	.583	23	30	.434
UNC Asheville	13	11	.542	26	31	.456
Charleston Southern	11	13	.458	24	34	.414
Liberty	9	15	.375	25	30	.455
VMI	4	20	.167	23	32	.418
High Point	4	20	.167	11	44	.200

Big Ten Conference
	Conf			Overall		
Team	W	L	Pct	W	L	Pct
Minnesota	21	10	.677	38	23	.623
Ohio State	19	12	.655	36	25	.590
Michigan	19	13	.594	34	26	.567
Michigan State	19	13	.594	33	26	.559
Purdue	17	14	.548	29	28	.509
Penn State	17	15	.531	28	29	.491
Northwestern	14	18	.438	26	28	.481
Iowa	12	20	.375	20	35	.364
Illinois	11	21	.344	22	33	.400
Indiana	9	22	.290	25	30	.455

Big 12 Conference
	Conf			Overall		
Team	W	L	Pct	W	L	Pct
Texas	19	7	.731	58	15	.795
Oklahoma	19	8	.704	38	24	.613
Texas Tech	17	9	.654	40	21	.656
Oklahoma State	15	11	.577	38	24	.613
Texas A&M	14	12	.538	42	22	.656
Baylor	13	12	.520	29	31	.483
Missouri	12	14	.462	38	23	.623
Nebraska	11	16	.407	36	23	.610
Kansas	7	19	.269	31	31	.500
Kansas State	4	23	.148	26	30	.464

Big West Conference
	Conf			Overall		
Team	W	L	Pct	W	L	Pct
Cal State Fullerton	19	2	.905	47	22	.681
Long Beach State	14	7	.667	40	21	.656
UC Riverside	11	10	.524	33	24	.579
Cal Poly	10	11	.476	38	23	.623
UC Santa Barbara	10	11	.476	33	21	.611
UC Irvine	10	11	.476	34	23	.596
Pacific	5	16	.238	20	34	.370
Cal State Northridge	5	16	.238	19	38	.333

Colonial Athletic Association
	Conf			Overall		
Team	W	L	Pct	W	L	Pct
George Mason	20	4	.833	39	19	.672
UNC Wilmington	17	6	.739	40	23	.635
William & Mary	14	10	.583	37	20	.649
Virginia Commonwealth	14	10	.583	34	24	.586
Old Dominion	13	11	.542	26	28	.481
Delaware	12	11	.522	33	24	.579
James Madison	8	16	.333	28	26	.519
Towson	6	18	.250	17	35	.327
Hofstra	3	21	.125	14	36	.280

Conference USA
	Conf			Overall		
Team	W	L	Pct	W	L	Pct
East Carolina	25	5	.833	51	13	.797
Southern Miss	21	9	.700	45	19	.703
Tulane	21	9	.700	41	21	.661
Texas Christian	19	11	.633	39	26	.600
Houston	19	11	.633	30	29	.508
Memphis	15	14	.517	29	28	.509
UAB	13	16	.448	30	29	.508
Louisville	13	17	.433	26	30	.464
South Florida	12	17	.414	31	24	.564
Charlotte	9	21	.300	20	32	.385
Cincinnati	6	24	.200	15	40	.273
Saint Louis	5	24	.172	14	41	.255

Horizon League
	Conf			Overall		
Team	W	L	Pct	W	L	Pct
Illinois–Chicago	14	8	.636	35	21	.625
Butler	13	11	.542	29	30	.492
Cleveland State	11	12	.478	19	33	.365
Wright State	10	11	.476	22	34	.393
Wisconsin–Milwaukee	9	10	.474	23	30	.434
Detroit	10	12	.455	19	38	.333
Youngstown State	7	10	.412	22	32	.407

Ivy League
	Conf				Overall	
Team	W	L	Pct	W	L	Pct
Lou Gehrig
Princeton	12	8	.600	28	20	.583
Columbia	8	12	.400	14	28	.333
Cornell	7	13	.350	13	29	.310
Penn	5	15	.250	10	27	.270
Red Rolfe
Dartmouth	15	5	.750	25	17	.595
Harvard	13	7	.650	21	18	.538
Yale	11	9	.550	19	20	.487
Brown	9	11	.450	16	26	.381

Metro Atlantic Athletic Conference
	Conf			Overall		
Team	W	L	Pct	W	L	Pct
Le Moyne	24	3	.889	36	21	.632
Niagara	16	9	.640	27	27	.500
Manhattan	16	9	.640	25	27	.481
Marist	17	10	.630	25	30	.455
Rider	15	12	.556	25	27	.481
Siena	13	12	.520	27	26	.509
Iona	11	14	.440	21	31	.404
Fairfield	11	16	.407	16	27	.372
Saint Peter's	4	23	.148	8	34	.190
Canisius	4	23	.148	4	43	.085

Mid-American Conference
	Conf			Overall		
Team	W	L	Pct	W	L	Pct
East
Miami (OH)	14	8	.636	36	21	.632
Kent State	14	10	.583	36	27	.571
Ohio	12	12	.500	25	29	.463
Akron	11	12	.478	26	27	.491
Marshall	10	13	.435	27	27	.500
Buffalo	4	18	.182	15	39	.278
West
Central Michigan	18	6	.750	33	24	.579
Eastern Michigan	14	10	.583	32	27	.542
Northern Illinois	14	10	.583	31	28	.525
Ball State	14	10	.583	28	28	.500
Bowling Green	13	11	.542	28	19	.596
Toledo	8	16	.333	20	34	.370
Western Michigan	7	17	.292	21	33	.389

Mid-Continent Conference
	Conf			Overall		
Team	W	L	Pct	W	L	Pct
Oral Roberts	21	1	.955	50	11	.820
Western Illinois	13	11	.542	29	36	.527
Centenary	10	11	.476	23	31	.426
Southern Utah	11	13	.458	19	30	.388
Valparaiso	11	13	.458	20	34	.370
Oakland	10	13	.435	20	34	.370
Chicago State	5	19	.208	8	52	.133

Mid-Eastern Athletic Conference
	Conf			Overall		
Team	W	L	Pct	W	L	Pct
Bethune–Cookman	14	4	.778	27	28	.491
Delaware State	11	5	.688	27	23	.540
Florida A&M	9	6	.600	22	30	.423
North Carolina A&T	10	8	.556	23	28	.451
Norfolk State	8	9	.471	17	30	.362
Coppin State	8	10	.444	18	32	.360
Maryland–Eastern Shore	0	18	.000	3	44	.064

Missouri Valley Conference
	Conf			Overall		
Team	W	L	Pct	W	L	Pct
Wichita State	28	4	.875	49	16	.891
Creighton	22	9	.710	35	24	.593
Southwest Missouri State	19	12	.613	31	28	.525
Southern Illinois	15	16	.484	27	32	.458
Evansville	12	20	.375	28	32	.467
Northern Iowa	12	20	.375	25	31	.446
Indiana State	12	20	.375	20	37	.351
Bradley	11	20	.355	29	36	.446
Illinois State	11	21	.344	21	34	.382

Mountain West Conference
	Conf			Overall		
Team	W	L	Pct	W	L	Pct
San Diego State	19	9	.679	35	29	.547
UNLV	20	10	.667	37	24	.607
New Mexico	20	10	.667	26	29	.473
BYU	18	12	.600	28	30	.483
Utah	11	19	.367	22	36	.379
Air Force	0	28	.000	6	49	.109

Northeast Conference
	Conf			Overall		
Team	W	L	Pct	W	L	Pct
Central Connecticut	20	4	.833	41	17	.707
Quinnipiac	16	7	.696	23	21	.523
Monmouth	13	10	.565	22	29	.431
Wagner	12	11	.522	20	29	.408
Fairleigh Dickinson	11	13	.458	12	28	.300
Mount St. Mary's	10	13	.435	25	18	.581
Sacred Heart	10	14	.417	12	36	.250
Long Island	7	16	.304	9	29	.237
St. Francis (NY)	6	17	.261	12	30	.286

Ohio Valley Conference
	Conf			Overall		
Team	W	L	Pct	W	L	Pct
Austin Peay	20	7	.741	35	21	.625
Eastern Illinois	17	9	.654	26	30	.464
Jacksonville State	16	11	.593	31	29	.517
Eastern Kentucky	15	11	.577	34	17	.667
Southeast Missouri State	15	11	.577	29	28	.509
Samford	15	12	.556	25	33	.431
Murray State	11	16	.407	17	35	.327
Tennessee Tech	10	16	.385	15	31	.326
Tennessee–Martin	7	20	.259	16	38	.296
Morehead State	7	20	.259	14	40	.259

Pacific-10 Conference
	Conf			Overall		
Team	W	L	Pct	W	L	Pct
Stanford	16	8	.667	46	14	.767
Washington	15	9	.625	39	20	.661
UCLA	14	10	.583	35	29	.547
Arizona State	13	11	.542	41	18	.695
Arizona	12	12	.500	36	27	.571
Oregon State	10	14	.417	31	22	.585
USC	10	14	.417	24	32	.429
Washington State	9	15	.375	29	26	.527
California	9	15	.375	25	31	.446

Patriot League
	Conf			Overall		
Team	W	L	Pct	W	L	Pct
Army	17	3	.850	37	15	.712
Lafayette	11	9	.550	23	26	.469
Lehigh	9	11	.450	25	21	.543
Holy Cross	9	11	.450	14	22	.389
Bucknell	7	13	.350	20	24	.455
Navy	7	13	.350	14	36	.280

Southeastern Conference
Team	W	L	Pct	W	L	Pct
East
Georgia	19	11	.633	45	23	.662
South Carolina	17	13	.567	53	17	.757
Florida	17	13	.567	43	22	.662
Vanderbilt	16	14	.533	45	19	.703
Tennessee	14	16	.467	38	24	.613
Kentucky	7	23	.233	24	30	.444
West
Arkansas	19	11	.633	45	24	.652
LSU	18	12	.600	46	19	.708
Ole Miss	18	12	.600	39	21	.650
Mississippi State	13	17	.433	35	24	.507
Auburn	12	18	.400	32	24	.571
Alabama	10	20	.333	29	26	.527

Southern Conference
	Conf			Overall		
Team	W	L	Pct	W	L	Pct
College of Charleston	25	5	.833	47	16	.746
The Citadel	21	9	.700	39	28	.582
Georgia Southern	21	9	.700	34	25	.576
Elon	17	13	.567	31	28	.525
UNC Greensboro	16	14	.533	33	21	.611
East Tennessee State	15	15	.500	28	30	.483
Davidson	13	17	.433	20	33	.377
Western Carolina	12	18	.400	28	31	.475
Furman	11	19	.367	21	33	.389
Wofford	8	22	.267	17	30	.362
Appalachian State	6	24	.200	10	33	.233

Southland Conference
	Conf			Overall		
Team	W	L	Pct	W	L	Pct
Lamar	18	8	.692	41	16	.719
Northwestern State	16	9	.640	33	23	.589
Texas State	16	10	.615	32	26	.552
Texas–Arlington	14	13	.519	32	26	.552
Louisiana–Monroe	12	14	.462	30	28	.517
Texas–San Antonio	12	14	.462	27	31	.466
Sam Houston State	11	14	.440	19	30	.388
McNeese State	11	16	.407	24	29	.453
Southeastern Louisiana	11	16	.407	17	39	.304
Nicholls State	9	16	.360	20	29	.408

Southwestern Athletic Conference
	Conf			Overall		
Team	W	L	Pct	W	L	Pct
East
Mississippi Valley State	23	9	.719	35	23	.603
Jackson State	19	9	.679	29	20	.592
Alcorn State	13	17	.433	20	22	.476
Alabama State	11	19	.367	18	33	.353
Alabama A&M	8	20	.286	18	32	.360
West
Southern	19	7	.731	26	14	.650
Texas Southern	15	13	.536	19	35	.352
Prairie View A&M	17	15	.531	30	26	.536
Arkansas Pine–Bluff	15	15	.500	18	29	.383
Grambling State	6	22	.214	11	35	.239

Sun Belt Conference
	Conf			Overall		
Team	W	L	Pct	W	L	Pct
Middle Tennessee	16	8	.667	40	22	.645
South Alabama	16	8	.667	30	28	.517
New Orleans	13	10	.565	27	28	.491
Louisiana–Lafayette	11	11	.500	34	23	.596
New Mexico State	12	12	.500	33	25	.569
Western Kentucky	12	12	.500	35	28	.556
Florida International	12	12	.500	29	33	.468
Arkansas State	8	15	.348	29	28	.509
Arkansas–Little Rock	6	18	.250	16	32	.333

West Coast Conference
	Conf			Overall		
Team	W	L	Pct	W	L	Pct
Coast
Loyola Marymount	20	7	.741	32	22	.593
San Diego	19	11	.633	35	21	.625
Gonzaga	16	11	.593	24	27	.471
Saint Mary's	7	23	.233	14	41	.255
West
Pepperdine	19	11	.633	30	32	.484
Santa Clara	16	14	.533	27	29	.482
San Francisco	14	16	.467	27	32	.458
Portland	6	24	.200	12	44	.214

Western Athletic Conference
	Conf			Overall		
Team	W	L	Pct	W	L	Pct
Rice	24	6	.800	46	14	.767
Fresno State	17	12	.586	29	29	.500
Nevada	14	16	.467	30	29	.508
Hawaii	13	16	.448	31	24	.564
San Jose State	11	19	.367	23	31	.426
Louisiana Tech	10	20	.333	20	38	.345

Division I Independents
Team	W	L	Pct
Miami (FL)	50	13	.794
Dallas Baptist	44	16	.733
Northern Colorado	29	23	.558
Utah Valley	19	17	.528
Savannah State	24	22	.522
Sacramento State	29	32	.475
Texas A&M–Corpus Christi	23	28	.451
Texas–Pan American	22	31	.415
IPFW	20	31	.392
NYIT	20	32	.385
Pace	19	31	.380
Hawaii–Hilo	9	43	.173

Team won the conference tournament and the automatic bid to the NCAA tournament
Conference does not have conference tournament, so team won the autobid for finishing in first
Team received at-large bid to NCAA tournament

== College World Series ==
The 2004 season marked the fifty eighth NCAA baseball tournament, which culminated with the eight team College World Series. The College World Series was held in Omaha, Nebraska. The eight teams played a double-elimination format, with Cal State Fullerton claiming their fourth championship with a two games to none series win over Texas in the final.

=== Bracket ===
First round
Arizona	7
Georgia	8
8	Arkansas	2
1	Texas	13
Arizona	7
8	Arkansas	2
Cal State Fullerton	2
2	South Carolina	0
LSU	5
3	Miami (FL)	9
2	South Carolina	15
LSU	4

Second round
Georgia	3
1	Texas	9
Georgia	3
Arizona	1
Cal State Fullerton	6
3	Miami (FL)	3
3	Miami (FL)	11
2	South Carolina	15

Semifinals
1	Texas	7	—
Georgia	6	—
Cal State Fullerton	3	4
2	South Carolina	5	0

Finals
1	Texas	4	2	—
Cal State Fullerton	6	3	—
