= 2004 Texas Longhorns baseball team =

American college baseball season

2004 Texas Longhorns baseball

Big 12 Regular season champion

College World Series, Runner Up
- Conference: Big 12 Conference

Ranking
- Coaches: No. 2
- CB: No. 2
- Record: 58–15 (19–7 Big 12)
- Head coach: Augie Garrido (8th year)
- Assistant coach: Tommy Harmon (13th year); Frank Anderson (3rd year)
- Home stadium: Disch–Falk Field

2004 Big 12 Conference baseball standings
	Conf.						Overall
Team	W		L		T	PCT	W		L		T	PCT
No. 2 Texas ‍†‍‍^{y}	19	–	7	–	0	.731	58	–	15	–	0	.795
Oklahoma ‍‍‍^{y}	19	–	8	–	0	.704	38	–	24	–	0	.613
Texas Tech ‍‍‍^{y}	17	–	9	–	0	.654	40	–	21	–	0	.656
Oklahoma State ‍‍‡‍^{y}	15	–	11	–	0	.577	38	–	24	–	0	.613
No. 16 Texas A&M ‍‍‍^{y}	14	–	12	–	0	.538	42	–	22	–	0	.656
Baylor ‍‍‍	13	–	12	–	0	.520	29	–	31	–	0	.483
Missouri ‍‍‍^{y}	12	–	14	–	0	.462	38	–	23	–	1	.621
Nebraska ‍‍‍	11	–	16	–	0	.407	36	–	23	–	0	.610
Kansas ‍‍‍	7	–	19	–	0	.269	31	–	31	–	1	.500
Kansas State ‍‍‍	4	–	23	–	0	.148	26	–	30	–	0	.464
† – Conference champion ‡ – Tournament champion y – Invited to the NCAA tournament As of June 30, 2004; Rankings from Collegiate Baseball

The 2004 Texas Longhorns baseball team represented the University of Texas at Austin in the 2004 NCAA Division I baseball season. The Longhorns played their home games at Disch–Falk Field. The team was coached by Augie Garrido in his 8th season at Texas.

The Longhorns reached the College World Series final, falling in two games to champion Cal State Fullerton.

== Roster ==
2004 Texas Longhorns roster
Pitchers: Buck Cody; J. B. Cox; J. P. Howell; Sam LeCure; Kyle McCulloch; Jesen Merle; Justin Simmons; Huston Street; Kyle Yates; Catchers: Ruben Gonzales; Pack Landfair; Diego Lizarraga; Taylor Teagarden; Curtis Thigpen	Infielders: Will Crouch; Hunter Harris; Michael Hollimon; Robin Rodriguez; Seth Johnston; David Maroul; Nick Peoples; J. D. Reininger; Chance Wheeless	Outfielders: Carson Kainer; Dooley Prince; Ryan Russ; Drew Stubbs; Brian Esquivel

== Schedule ==
2004 Texas Longhorns baseball game log (58–15)
Regular season (48–11)
January/February (15–2)

Date	Opponent	Rank	Site/stadium	Score	Overall record	Big 12 record
Jan 30	at Hawaii	No. 5	Les Murakami Stadium • Honolulu, HI	W 7–4	1–0	–
Jan 31	at Hawaii	No. 5	Les Murakami Stadium • Honolulu, HI	W 13–9 (11)	2–0	–
Feb 1	at Hawaii	No. 5	Les Murakami Stadium • Honolulu, HI	W 10–1	3–0	–
Feb 6	San Diego	No. 5	Disch–Falk Field • Austin, TX	W 9–0	4–0	–
Feb 7	San Diego	No. 5	Disch–Falk Field • Austin, TX	W 4–3	5–0	–
Feb 8	San Diego	No. 5	Disch–Falk Field • Austin, TX	W 6–5 (10)	6–0	–
Minute Maid Park College Classic
Feb 13	vs. No. 30 Ohio State	No. 5	Minute Maid Park • Houston, TX	6–0	7–0	–
Feb 14	vs. No. 1 Rice	No. 5	Minute Maid Park • Houston, TX	W 6–3	8–0	–
Feb 15	vs. Houston	No. 5	Minute Maid Park • Houston, TX	W 6–5	9–0	–
Feb 17	Texas State	No. 1	Disch–Falk Field • Austin, TX	W 4–1	10–0	–
Feb 20	at No. 6 Stanford	No. 1	Sunken Diamond • Stanford, CA	L 4–7	10–1	–
Feb 21	at No. 6 Stanford	No. 1	Sunken Diamond • Stanford, CA	W 9–6	11–1	–
Feb 22	at No. 6 Stanford	No. 1	Sunken Diamond • Stanford, CA	L 1–8	11–2	–
Feb 25	Texas A&M–Corpus Christi	No. 4	Disch–Falk Field • Austin, TX	W 8–2	12–2	–
Feb 27	San Diego State	No. 4	Disch–Falk Field • Austin, TX	W 6–0	13–2	–
Feb 28	San Diego State	No. 4	Disch–Falk Field • Austin, TX	W 3–2 (10)	14–2	–
Feb 29	San Diego State	No. 4	Disch–Falk Field • Austin, TX	W 9–0	15–2	–

March (14–2)

Date	Opponent	Rank	Site/stadium	Score	Overall record	Big 12 record
Mar 2	No. 4 Rice	No. 3	Disch–Falk Field • Austin, TX	W 8–7	16–2	–
Mar 5	No. 27 Cal State Fullerton	No. 3	Disch–Falk Field • Austin, TX	W 6–2	17–2	–
Mar 6	Sam Houston State	No. 3	Disch–Falk Field • Austin, TX	W 11–8	18–2	–
Mar 7	No. 27 Cal State Fullerton	No. 3	Disch–Falk Field • Austin, TX	W 3–1	19–2	–
Mar 9	at No. 6 Rice	No. 3	Reckling Park • Houston, TX	W 5–0	20–2	–
Mar 12	Eastern Michigan	No. 3	Disch–Falk Field • Austin, TX	W 3–2	21–2	–
Mar 13	Eastern Michigan	No. 3	Disch–Falk Field • Austin, TX	W 7–0	22–2	–
Mar 14	Eastern Michigan	No. 3	Disch–Falk Field • Austin, TX	W 8–3	23–2	–
Mar 16	at UTSA	No. 3	Roadrunner Field • San Antonio, TX	W 4–2	24–2	–
Mar 19	at Oklahoma	No. 3	L. Dale Mitchell Baseball Park • Norman, OK	W 3–1	25–2	1–0
Mar 20	at Oklahoma	No. 3	L. Dale Mitchell Baseball Park • Norman, OK	L 2–3	25–3	1–1
Mar 21	at Oklahoma	No. 3	L. Dale Mitchell Baseball Park • Norman, OK	W 5–4	26–3	2–1
Mar 26	Oklahoma State	No. 3	Disch–Falk Field • Austin, TX	W 8–4	27–3	3–1
Mar 27	Oklahoma State	No. 3	Disch–Falk Field • Austin, TX	L 2–3 (10)	27–4	3–2
Mar 28	Oklahoma State	No. 3	Disch–Falk Field • Austin, TX	W 11–3	28–4	4–2
Mar 30	Texas–Pan American	No. 3	Disch–Falk Field • Austin, TX	W 10–1	29–4	–

April (12–3)

Date	Opponent	Rank	Site/stadium	Score	Overall record	Big 12 record
Apr 3	at Texas Tech	No. 3	Dan Law Field • Lubbock, TX	W 4–0	30–4	5–2
Apr 3	at Texas Tech	No. 3	Dan Law Field • Lubbock, TX	W 10–0	31–4	6–2
Apr 6	UTSA	No. 3	Disch–Falk Field • Austin, TX	W 4–2	32–4	–
Apr 9	at Kansas State	No. 3	Tointon Family Stadium • Manhattan, KS	W 10–6 (20)	33–4	7–2
Apr 10	at Kansas State	No. 3	Tointon Family Stadium • Manhattan, KS	W 5–2	34–4	8–2
Apr 11	at Kansas State	No. 3	Tointon Family Stadium • Manhattan, KS	W 4–1	35–4	9–2
Apr 13	No. 3 Rice	No. 1	Disch–Falk Field • Austin, TX	W 3–2	36–4	–
Apr 16	at Baylor	No. 1	Baylor Ballpark • Waco, TX	W 7–6	37–4	10–2
Apr 17	Baylor	No. 1	Disch–Falk Field • Austin, TX	L 3–5 (10)	37–5	10–3
Apr 18	Baylor	No. 1	Disch–Falk Field • Austin, TX	W 11–1	38–5	11–3
Apr 20	Texas State	No. 1	Disch–Falk Field • Austin, TX	W 9–3	39–5	
Apr 23	No. 20 Nebraska	No. 1	Disch–Falk Field • Austin, TX	W 8–2	40–5	12–3
Apr 24	No. 20 Nebraska	No. 1	Disch–Falk Field • Austin, TX	W 4–2	41–5	13–3
Apr 25	No. 20 Nebraska	No. 1	Disch–Falk Field • Austin, TX	L 3–4	41–6	13–4
Apr 30	at Missouri	No. 1	Taylor Stadium • Columbia, MO	L 1–4	41–7	13–5

May (7–4)

Date	Opponent	Rank	Site/stadium	Score	Overall record	Big 12 record
May 1	at Missouri	No. 1	Taylor Stadium • Columbia, MO	L 0–8	41–8	13–6
May 2	at Missouri	No. 1	Taylor Stadium • Columbia, MO	W 16–0 (7)	42–8	14–6
May 4	Texas State	No. 2	Disch–Falk Field • Austin, TX	W 9–3	43–8	–
May 7	Kansas	No. 2	Disch–Falk Field • Austin, TX	W 4–2	44–8	15–6
May 8	Kansas	No. 2	Disch–Falk Field • Austin, TX	W 6–5	45–8	16–6
May 9	Kansas	No. 2	Disch–Falk Field • Austin, TX	W 7–1	46–8	17–6
May 15	NC State	No. 1	Disch–Falk Field • Austin, TX	L 0–2	46–9	–
May 15	NC State	No. 1	Disch–Falk Field • Austin, TX	L 0–1	46–10	–
May 21	No. 30 Texas A&M	No. 2	Disch–Falk Field • Austin, TX	W 6–3	47–10	18–6
May 22	No. 30 Texas A&M	No. 2	Disch–Falk Field • Austin, TX	W 12–9	48–10	19–6
May 23	No. 30 Texas A&M	No. 2	Disch–Falk Field • Austin, TX	L 1–7	48–11	20–6

Postseason (10–4)
Big 12 Tournament (2–2)

Date	Opponent	Seed/Rank	Site/stadium	Score	Overall record	Big 12T record
May 26	(8) Nebraska	(1) No. 1	Ameriquest Field in Arlington • Arlington, TX	L 2–5	48–12	0–1
May 27	(5) No. 29 Texas A&M	(1) No. 1	Ameriquest Field in Arlington • Arlington, TX	W 13–6	49–12	1–1
May 28	(8) Nebraska	(1) No. 1	Ameriquest Field in Arlington • Arlington, TX	W 6–5	50–12	2–1
May 29	(4) Oklahoma State	(1) No. 1	Ameriquest Field in Arlington • Arlington, TX	L 2–8	50–13	2–2

NCAA tournament: Austin Regional (3–0)

Date	Opponent	Seed/Rank	Site/stadium	Score	Overall record	NCAAT record
June 4	(4) Youngstown State	(1) No. 3	Disch–Falk Field • Austin, TX	W 10–3	51–13	1–0
June 5	(2) No. 15 Oral Roberts	(1) No. 3	Disch–Falk Field • Austin, TX	W 7–5	52–13	2–0
June 6	(2) No. 15 Oral Roberts	(1) No. 3	Disch–Falk Field • Austin, TX	W 7–3	53–13	3–0

NCAA tournament: Austin Super Regional (2–0)

Date	Opponent	Seed/Rank	Site/stadium	Score	Overall record	NCAAT record
June 4	No. 16 Vanderbilt	(1) No. 2	Disch–Falk Field • Austin, TX	W 15–3	54–13	4–0
June 5	No. 16 Vanderbilt	(1) No. 2	Disch–Falk Field • Austin, TX	W 10–2	55–13	5–0

NCAA tournament: College World Series (3–2)

Date	Opponent	Seed/Rank	Site/stadium	Score	Overall record	CWS record
June 18	(8) No. 3 Arkansas	(1) No. 2	Johnny Rosenblatt Stadium • Omaha, NE	W 13–2	56–13	1–0
June 20	No. 5 Georgia	(1) No. 2	Johnny Rosenblatt Stadium • Omaha, NE	W 9–3	57–13	2–0
June 23	No. 5 Georgia	(1) No. 2	Johnny Rosenblatt Stadium • Omaha, NE	W 7–6	58–13	3–0
June 26	No. 4 Cal State Fullerton	(1) No. 2	Johnny Rosenblatt Stadium • Omaha, NE	L 4–6	58–14	3–1
June 27	No. 4 Cal State Fullerton	(1) No. 2	Johnny Rosenblatt Stadium • Omaha, NE	L 2–3	58–15	3–2

== Rankings ==
Ranking movements Legend: ██ Increase in ranking ██ Decrease in ranking
	Week																				
Poll	Pre	1	2	3	4	5	6	7	8	9	10	11	12	13	14	15	16	17	18	19	Final
Coaches'	1	1*	2	3	3	1	1	1	2	1	1	1	1	2	1	3	1	2	2*	2*	2
Baseball America																					2
Collegiate Baseball^	5	5	1	4	3	3	3	3	3	3	1	1	1	2	1	2	1	3	2	2	2
NCBWA†	6	4	1	2	2	2	2	2	2	1	1	1	1	2	1	2	1	2	2	2	2

^ Collegiate Baseball ranked 40 teams in their preseason poll, but only ranked 30 teams weekly during the season.
† NCBWA ranks 30 teams in their preseason poll, but only ranks 25 teams weekly during the season.
* A new poll was not released for this week, so for comparison purposes, the previous week's ranking is inserted in this week's slot.
