= Big 12 Conference baseball tournament =

American college baseball tournament

- Conference baseball championship
- Sport: Baseball
- Conference: Big 12 Conference
- Number of teams: 12
- Format: single elimination
- Current stadium: Surprise Stadium
- Current location: Surprise, AZ
- Played: 1997–present
- Last contest: 2025
- Current champion: Kansas (2)
- Most championships: Texas (5)
- TV partner(s): ESPN+, ESPNU
- Official website: Big12Sports.com – Baseball

Sponsors
- Phillips 66

Host stadiums
- All Sports Stadium (1997); Chickasaw Bricktown Ballpark (1998–2001, 2003, 2005–2014, 2016–2019, 2021); The Ballpark in Arlington (2002, 2004); ONEOK Field (2015); Globe Life Field (2022–2025); Surprise Stadium (2026–present)

Host locations
- Oklahoma City (1997–2001, 2003, 2005–2014, 2016–2019, 2021); Tulsa, Oklahoma (2015); Arlington, Texas (2002, 2004, 2022–present)

The Big 12 Conference baseball tournament (sometimes known simply as the Big 12 tournament) is the conference championship tournament in baseball for the Big 12 Conference. The winner receives the conference's automatic bid to the NCAA Division I baseball tournament. The format has changed multiple times since the inaugural tournament was held in 1997. Conference realignment saw the Big 12 expand to 14 teams for 2025, The 2025 tournament will be a Single-elimination tournament with the top 12 teams in the final regular season standings qualifying for tournament. The top four teams in final regular season standings will receive byes into the second round.

== History ==
The Big 12 tournament was first played in 1997 at All Sports Stadium in Oklahoma City, before moving to Chickasaw Bricktown Ballpark the following year. The tournament has been played in Oklahoma City each year, save for 2002 and 2004, when the event was played in Arlington, Texas, at the home park of Major League Baseball's Texas Rangers. Over its 10-plus year history, the tournament has had three distinct formats. beginning with the 2022 Big 12 Conference baseball tournament, the tournament moved to Globe Life Field in Arlington, Texas

=== 1997–98 ===
In 1997 and 1998, the top six teams were invited to play in a double elimination tournament with no byes for any teams. The format mirrored the regional round of the NCAA tournament at that time.

=== 1999–2005 ===
Beginning in 1999, the tournament expanded to eight teams and followed the format of the College World Series. It consisted of two 4-team double-elimination brackets, with the winners facing off in a final championship game. The format mirrors that of the tournament format used by the Southeastern Conference, which continues to use this bracket.

=== 2006–2010 ===
In 2006 the tournament moved to a round-robin format. In this format, two pools of four teams play each other with the winners of each pool playing a one-game championship match. This format ended in 2010.

=== 2011–2023 ===
Starting with the 2011 Big 12 Conference baseball tournament, the tournament went back to the format used from 1999 to 2005. In 2021, the format changed for only that season to include a single-elimination play-in game with the 8th and 9th place teams before reverting back to the 8-team format for the following two years.

=== 2024 ===
Conference realignment saw the Big 12 expand to 13 teams for 2024, the tournament expanded to a 10-team modified double-elimination format, with the first and second place teams receiving a first round bye.

=== 2025 ===
Conference realignment saw the Big 12 expand to 14 teams for 2025, the tournament expanded to a 12-team single-elimination format, with the top four place teams receiving a first round bye.

== Champions ==
Year	Champion	Runner-up	Site	Most Outstanding Player
1997	Oklahoma	Texas Tech	All Sports Stadium • Oklahoma City, OK	Brian Shackelford (Oklahoma)
1998	Texas Tech	Texas A&M	AT&T Bricktown Ballpark • Oklahoma City, OK	Josh Bard (Texas Tech)
1999	Nebraska	Baylor	AT&T Bricktown Ballpark • Oklahoma City, OK	Jason Jennings (Baylor)
2000	Nebraska	Baylor	AT&T Bricktown Ballpark • Oklahoma City, OK	Adam Shabala (Nebraska)
2001	Nebraska	Texas A&M ‍‍‍	AT&T Bricktown Ballpark • Oklahoma City, OK	Dan Johnson (Nebraska)
2002	Texas	Nebraska	The Ballpark in Arlington • Arlington, TX	Dustin Majewski (Texas)
2003	Texas	Baylor	AT&T Bricktown Ballpark • Oklahoma City, OK	Dustin Majewski (Texas)
2004	Oklahoma State	Missouri	Ameriquest Field in Arlington • Arlington, TX	Cody Ehlers (Missouri)
2005	Nebraska	Baylor	AT&T Bricktown Ballpark • Oklahoma City, OK	Curtis Ledbetter (Nebraska)
2006	Kansas	Nebraska	AT&T Bricktown Ballpark • Oklahoma City, OK	Matt Baty (Kansas)
2007	Texas A&M	Baylor	AT&T Bricktown Ballpark • Oklahoma City, OK	Craig Stinson (Texas A&M)
2008	Texas	Kansas State ‍‍‍	AT&T Bricktown Ballpark • Oklahoma City, OK	Brandon Belt (Texas)
2009	Texas	Missouri	AT&T Bricktown Ballpark • Oklahoma City, OK	Brandon Loy (Texas)
2010	Texas A&M	Baylor	AT&T Bricktown Ballpark • Oklahoma City, OK	Brodie Greene (Texas A&M)
2011	Texas A&M	Missouri	RedHawks Ballpark • Oklahoma City, OK	Andrew Collazo (Texas A&M)
2012	Missouri	Oklahoma	Chickasaw Bricktown Ballpark • Oklahoma City, OK	Eric Garcia (Missouri)
2013	Oklahoma	Kansas ‍‍‍	Chickasaw Bricktown Ballpark • Oklahoma City, OK	Jon Gray (Oklahoma)
2014	TCU	Oklahoma State	Chickasaw Bricktown Ballpark • Oklahoma City, OK	Jerrick Suiter (TCU)
2015	Texas	Oklahoma State	ONEOK Field • Tulsa, OK	Zane Gurwitz (Texas)
2016	TCU	West Virginia	Chickasaw Bricktown Ballpark • Oklahoma City, OK	Luken Baker (TCU)
2017	Oklahoma State	Texas	Chickasaw Bricktown Ballpark • Oklahoma City, OK	Garrett McCain (Oklahoma State)
2018	Baylor	TCU	Chickasaw Bricktown Ballpark • Oklahoma City, OK	Cody Bradford (Baylor) and Shea Langeliers (Baylor)
2019	Oklahoma State	West Virginia	Chickasaw Bricktown Ballpark • Oklahoma City, OK	Colin Simpson (Oklahoma State)
2020	Cancelled due to the coronavirus pandemic			
2021	TCU	Oklahoma State	Chickasaw Bricktown Ballpark • Oklahoma City, OK	Porter Brown (TCU)
2022	Oklahoma	Texas	Globe Life Field • Arlington, TX	Peyton Graham (Oklahoma)
2023	TCU	Oklahoma State	Globe Life Field • Arlington, TX	Brayden Taylor (TCU)
2024	Oklahoma State	Oklahoma	Globe Life Field • Arlington, TX	Carson Benge (Oklahoma State)
2025	Arizona	TCU	Globe Life Field • Arlington, TX	Mason White (Arizona)
2026	Kansas	West Virginia	Surprise Stadium • Surprise, AZ	Tyson LeBlanc (Kansas)

=== By school ===
School	Appearances	W-L	Pct.	Championships	Years
Arizona	1	3–0	1.000	1	2025
Arizona State	2	1–2	.333	0	
BYU	2	2–1	.667	0	
Baylor	27	32–38	.457	1	2018
Cincinnati	3	1–3	.250	0	
Houston	1	0–0	–	0	
Iowa State	1	1–2	.333	0	
Kansas	14	13–17	.433	2	2006, 2026
Kansas State	16	16–19	.457	0	
Oklahoma State	27	30–37	.448	4	2004, 2017, 2019, 2024
Texas Tech	25	20–38	.345	1	1998
TCU	13	14–10	.583	4	2014, 2016, 2021, 2023
UCF	2	2-2	.500	0	
West Virginia	12	10–11	.476	0	
Utah	1	0–1	.000	0	

(As of the 2026 tournament)

- Italics indicate that the program no longer sponsors baseball in the Big 12.
- Big 12 member Colorado does not sponsor baseball after 1980

==== Former Big 12 schools ====
School	Appearances	W-L	Pct.	Championships	Years
Missouri	14	22–11	.667	1	2012
Nebraska	10	28–10	.737	4	1999, 2000, 2001, 2005
Oklahoma	28	39–36	.520	3	1997, 2013, 2022
Texas	23	41–31	.569	5	2002, 2003, 2008, 2009, 2015
Texas A&M	14	23–19	.548	3	2007, 2010, 2011

- Italics indicate that the program no longer sponsors baseball in the Big 12.

== Records ==
Team batting

	Inning			Game			Tournament			
Batting average				.475 (19–40)	Texas A&M (vs. Oklahoma)	5–22–09	.390 (69–177)	Texas Tech	1997	5 games
At-bats	15	Texas A&M (vs. Oklahoma) Texas (vs. Kansas State) Texas (vs. Missouri)	5–19–01 5–23–07 5–24–09	53	Oklahoma State (vs. Missouri) 13 inn.	5–30–04	225	Baylor	2003	6 games
Runs	11	Texas (vs. Missouri)	5–24–09	21	Oklahoma (vs. Oklahoma State)	5–27–06	53	Oklahoma State	1997	4 games
Hits	9	Oklahoma State (vs. Iowa State)	5–18–01	23	Nebraska (vs. Missouri)	5–28–05	71	Oklahoma Baylor	1997 2003	5 games 6 games
Doubles				7	Texas Tech (vs. Oklahoma) Oklahoma (vs. Missouri)	1997 1997	18	Oklahoma	1997	5 games
Triples	3	Oklahoma (vs. Texas Tech)	1997	4	Oklahoma (vs. Texas Tech)	1997	8	Oklahoma	1997	5 games
Home runs	3	Oklahoma State (vs. Texas A&M) Texas Tech (vs. Oklahoma)	1997 1997	5	Oklahoma State (vs. Texas A&M) Missouri (vs. Nebraska)	1997 5–17–00	10	Texas	2002	6 games
RBI's	10	Texas (vs. Missouri)	5–24–09	21	Oklahoma (vs. Oklahoma State)	5–27–06	46	Texas	2003	6 games
Stolen bases	3	Several teams		7	Baylor (vs. Texas) Baylor (vs. Texas Tech)	5–20–99 5–20–00	17	Baylor	1999	4 games
Walks	4	Oklahoma (vs. Baylor) Texas A&M (vs. Oklahoma)	5–28–04 5–22–09	12	Baylor (vs. Oklahoma	5–26–07	36	Nebraska	2000	6 games
Strikeouts				16	Nebraska (vs. Texas) Oklahoma (vs. Baylor)	5–26–04 5–26–07	51	Baylor	2003	6 games
Hit by pitch				5	Oklahoma (vs. Kansas State)	5–29–10	10	Nebraska	2005	6 games

Team fielding

	Inning			Game			Tournament			
Fielding %							1.000	Kansas Missouri Kansas State	2005 2007 2009	2 games 3 games 3 games
Putouts				42	Baylor (vs. Nebraska) Nebraska (vs. Baylor)	5–24–03	172	Baylor	2003	6 games
Assists				21	Oklahoma State (vs. Missouri)	5–30–04	78	Texas	2003	6 games
Errors	4	Baylor (vs. Oklahoma State)	5–26–05	6	Texas Tech (vs. Texas A&M) Texas A&M (vs. Texas)	5–16–98 5–27–04	11	Texas Tech	1998	5 games
Double plays				4	Several teams		8	Oklahoma Baylor Missouri	1997 2004 2009	5 games 4 games 4 games
Triple plays				1	Kansas (vs. Texas)	5–21–09				
Games played							6	Nebraska Texas Baylor Nebraska	2000 2002 2003 2005	

Team pitching

	Inning			Game			Tournament			
Lowest ERA							1.29	Baylor	1999	4 games
Highest ERA							12.60	Missouri	1997	2 games
Saves							3	Nebraska Baylor	2006 2007	4 games 4 games
Runs	11	Missouri (vs. Texas)	5–24–09	21	Oklahoma State (vs. Oklahoma)	5–27–06	43	Oklahoma	1997	5 games
Fewest runs							8	Baylor	1999	4 games
Hits	9	Iowa State (vs. Oklahoma State)	5–18–01	23	Missouri (vs. Nebraska)	5–28–05	66	Oklahoma	1997	5 games
Fewest hits				1	Nebraska (vs. Oklahoma State)	5–19–99	20	Oklahoma	2010	3 games
Home runs	3	Texas Tech (vs. Oklahoma) Texas A&M (vs. Oklahoma State)	1997 1997	5	Texas A&M (vs. Oklahoma State) Nebraska (vs. Missouri)	1997 5–17–00	8	Texas A&M	1997	3 games
Strikeouts				16	Texas (vs. Nebraska) Baylor (vs. Oklahoma)	5–26–04 5–26–07	47	Texas	2002	6 games
Walks	4	Baylor (vs. Oklahoma)	2004	12	Oklahoma (vs. Baylor)	2007	26	Oklahoma	2007	3 games
Fewest walks							3	Missouri	2006 2008	3 games
Innings				14	Baylor (vs. Nebraska) Nebraska (vs. Baylor)	5–24–03	57.1	Baylor	2003	6 games
Hit batters				5	Kansas State (vs. Oklahoma)	5–29–10	10	Texas	2003	6 games
Complete games							2	Nebraska Oklahoma State	1999 2004	
Shutouts							1	Several teams		

Individual batting

	Game				Tournament				
Batting average					.750 (6–8).750 (9–12)	Jeremy Dodson Chance Wheeless	Baylor Texas	1997 2007	
At bats	7	Several players			29	Tim Moss	Texas	2002	6 games
Runs	4	Several players			9	Several players			
Hits	5	Curtis Thigpen Curtis Ledbetter	Texas (vs. Baylor) Nebraska (vs. Missouri)	5–25–03 5–28–05	14 (27 AB)	Dustin Majewski	Texas	2002	6 games
Doubles	3	J.T. Wise	Oklahoma (vs. Texas A&M)	5–22–09	5	Brandon Toro	Texas Tech	1997	5 games
Triples	2	Several players			2	Several players			
Home runs	2	Several players			5	Dan Johnson	Nebraska	2001	
Grand slams					1	6 Players			
RBI's	6	Several players			13	Dan Johnson	Nebraska	2001	4 games
Stolen bases	3	Several players			6	John Cole	Nebraska	2001	4 games
Slugging %					1.100	Barrett Barnes Danny Black	Texas Tech Oklahoma	2010	3 games
Walks	3	Several players			8	Keith Ginter	Texas Tech	1998	5 games
Strikeouts	4	Several players			9	Aaron Gozart Kevin Sevigny	Nebraska Baylor	2000 2003	6 games
Hit by pitch					4	Jeff Ontiveros	Texas	2002	6 games

Individual fielding

	Game				Tournament				
Putouts	17	Several players			65	Jeff Ontiveros	Texas	2002	6 games
Assists	10	Shelby Ford	Oklahoma State (vs. Missouri)	5–24–06	22	Keith Ginter	Texas Tech	1998	5 games
Errors	4	Paul Witt	Baylor (vs. Oklahoma State)	5–26–05	8	Paul Witt	Baylor	2005	4 games

Individual pitching

	Game				Tournament				
Wins					2	Several players			
Losses					2	Mitch Walter Chase Bayuk	Kansas State	2002 2007	
ERA					0.00	Several players			
Saves					3	Brett Jensen Nick Cassavechia	Nebraska Baylor	2006 2007	
Appearances					4	Several players			
Strikeouts	13	Kendal Volz	Baylor (vs. Oklahoma)	5–26–07	14	Jason Jennings	Baylor	1999	14.2 innings
Innings	10	D.J. Jones	Texas (vs. Missouri)	5–21–99	15.2	Brian Duensing	Nebraska	2005	2 games
Hit batters	3	Shawn Tolleson	Baylor (vs. Nebraska)	5–21–08	3	Several players			
Complete games					1	Several players			

== See also ==
- List of Big 12 Conference champions
- Southwest Conference baseball tournament
- Baseball awards#U.S. college baseball
