= 2007 Big 12 Conference baseball tournament =

American college baseball tournament

- Teams: 8
- Format: Two four-team round-robin groups
- Finals site: AT&T Bricktown Ballpark; Oklahoma City, Oklahoma
- Champions: Texas A&M (1st title)
- Winning coach: Rob Childress (1st title)
- MVP: Craig Stinson (Texas A&M)
- Attendance: 85,016

2007 Big 12 Conference baseball standings
	Conf.				Overall
Team	W		L	PCT	W		L	PCT
No. 17 Texas ‍†‍‍^{y}	21	–	6	.778	46	–	17	.730
No. 27 Missouri ‍‍‍^{y}	19	–	8	.704	42	–	18	.700
No. 21 Oklahoma State ‍‍‍^{y}	16	–	11	.593	42	–	21	.667
Nebraska ‍‍‍^{y}	14	–	13	.519	32	–	27	.542
No. 14 Texas A&M ‍‍‡‍^{y}	13	–	13	.500	48	–	19	.716
Baylor ‍‍‍^{y}	12	–	15	.444	35	–	27	.565
Oklahoma ‍‍‍	11	–	16	.407	34	–	24	.586
Kansas State ‍‍‍	10	–	16	.385	34	–	24	.586
Kansas ‍‍‍	9	–	17	.346	28	–	30	.483
Texas Tech ‍‍‍	8	–	18	.308	28	–	27	.509
† – Conference champion ‡ – Tournament champion y – Invited to the NCAA tournament Rankings from Collegiate Baseball

The 2007 Big 12 Conference baseball tournament was held at AT&T Bricktown Ballpark in Oklahoma City, OK from May 23 through 27. Texas A&M won the tournament and earned the Big 12 Conference's automatic bid to the 2007 NCAA Division I baseball tournament. This was the second year the conference used the round robin tournament setup. The winners of each group at the end of the round robin faced each other in a one-game match for the championship.

== Regular season standings ==
Place	Seed	Team	Conference				Overall		
Place	Seed	Team	W	L	%	GB	W	L	%
1	1	Texas	21	6	.778	–	46	17	.730
2	2	Missouri	19	8	.704	2	42	18	.700
3	3	Oklahoma State	16	11	.593	5	42	21	.667
4	4	Nebraska	14	13	.519	7	32	27	.542
5	5	Texas A&M	13	13	.500	7.5	48	19	.716
6	6	Baylor	12	15	.444	9	35	27	.565
7	7	Oklahoma	11	16	.407	10	34	24	.586
8	8	Kansas State	10	16	.385	10.5	34	24	.586
9	–	Kansas	9	17	.346	11.5	28	30	.483
10	–	Texas Tech	8	18	.308	12.5	28	27	.509

- Colorado and Iowa State did not sponsor baseball teams.

== Tournament ==
	Division A	UT	Neb	A&M	KSU	Overall
1	Texas		5-4	3-7	19-10	2-1
4	Nebraska	4-5		5-3	1-5	1-2
5	Texas A&M	7-3	3-5		7-2	2-1*
8	Kansas State	10-19	5-1	2-7		1-2

	Division B	Mizzu	OSU	Bay	OU	Overall
2	Missouri		13-1	5-10	2-7	1-2
3	Oklahoma State	1-13		1-3	8-9	0-3
6	Baylor	10-5	3-1		7-6	3-0
7	Oklahoma	7-2	9-8	6-7		2-1

Finals
A	Texas A&M	14
B	Baylor	6

- Texas Tech and Kansas did not make the tournament.
- Texas A&M held the tiebreaker over Texas by beating them head-to-head 7-3

== All-Tournament team ==
Position	Player	School
1B	Chance Wheeless	Texas
2B	Brock Bond	Missouri
3B	Aaron Reza	Oklahoma
SS	Beamer Weems	Baylor
C	Craig Stinson	Texas A&M
OF	Joseph Hughes	Oklahoma
OF	Jordan Danks	Texas
OF	Ty Wright	Oklahoma State
DH	Matt Czimskey	Baylor
P	Kendal Volz	Baylor
P	Brad Hutt	Kansas State
MOP	Craig Stinson	Texas A&M

== See also ==
- College World Series
- NCAA Division I Baseball Championship
- Big 12 Conference baseball tournament
