= 2001 Big 12 Conference baseball tournament =

American college baseball tournament

- Teams: 8
- Format: Double elimination
- Finals site: SBC Bricktown Ballpark; Oklahoma City, Oklahoma
- Champions: Nebraska (3rd title)
- Winning coach: Dave Van Horn (3rd title)
- MVP: Dan Johnson (Nebraska)
- Attendance: 105,053

2001 Big 12 Conference baseball standings
	Conf.						Overall
Team	W		L		T	PCT	W		L		T	PCT
No. 7 Nebraska ‍†‍‡‍^{y}	20	–	8	–	0	.714	50	–	16	–	1	.754
No. 21 Texas Tech ‍‍‍	19	–	10	–	1	.650	42	–	20	–	1	.675
No. 28 Texas ‍‍‍^{y}	19	–	11	–	0	.633	36	–	26	–	0	.581
No. 22 Baylor ‍‍‍^{y}	17	–	10	–	0	.630	37	–	24	–	0	.607
Oklahoma State ^{y} ‍‍‍	16	–	14	–	0	.533	42	–	22	–	0	.656
Texas A&M ‍‍‍	15	–	15	–	0	.500	33	–	27	–	0	.550
Oklahoma ‍‍‍	13	–	16	–	1	.450	25	–	33	–	1	.432
Iowa State ‍‍‍	11	–	15	–	0	.423	24	–	29	–	1	.454
Kansas State ‍‍‍	10	–	17	–	0	.370	25	–	28	–	0	.472
Missouri ‍‍‍	11	–	19	–	0	.367	31	–	24	–	1	.563
Kansas ‍‍‍	7	–	23	–	0	.233	26	–	30	–	0	.464
† – Conference champion ‡ – Tournament champion y – Invited to the NCAA tournament As of June 30, 2001; Rankings from Collegiate Baseball

The 2001 Big 12 Conference baseball tournament was held at AT&T Bricktown Ballpark in Oklahoma City, OK from May 17 through 21. Nebraska won their third tournament in a row and earned the Big 12 Conference's automatic bid to the 2001 NCAA Division I baseball tournament. The tournament mirrored the format of the College World Series, with two 4-team double-elimination brackets and a final championship game.

It was also the final appearance for Iowa State in the tournament, as they discontinued their baseball program following the season.

== Regular season standings ==
Place	Seed	Team	Conference					Overall			
Place	Seed	Team	W	L	T	%	GB	W	L	T	%
1	1	Nebraska	20	8	0	.714	–	50	16	0	.758
2	2	Texas Tech	19	10	1	.650	1.5	43	20	1	.680
3	3	Texas	19	11	0	.633	2	36	26	0	.581
4	4	Baylor	17	10	0	.630	2.5	37	24	0	.607
5	5	Oklahoma State	16	14	0	.533	5	42	22	0	.656
6	6	Texas A&M	15	15	0	.500	6	33	27	0	.550
7	7	Oklahoma	13	16	1	.450	7.5	25	33	1	.432
8	8	Iowa State	11	15	0	.423	8	24	29	1	.454
9	–	Kansas State	10	17	0	.370	9.5	25	28	0	.472
10	–	Missouri	11	19	0	.367	10	31	24	1	.563
11	–	Kansas	7	23	0	.233	14	26	30	0	.464

- Colorado did not sponsor a baseball team.

== Tournament ==
First round
6	Texas A&M	9
3	Texas	8
2	Texas Tech	17
7	Oklahoma	5
3	Texas	7
7	Oklahoma	9
5	Oklahoma State	18
4	Baylor	4
1	Nebraska	5
8	Iowa State	2
4	Baylor	5
8	Iowa State	6

Second round
6	Texas A&M	8
2	Texas Tech	6
7	Oklahoma	4
2	Texas Tech	3
5	Oklahoma State	1
1	Nebraska	8
8	Iowa State	4
5	Oklahoma State	17

Semifinals
6	Texas A&M	10	-
7	Oklahoma	1	-
1	Nebraska	10	-
5	Oklahoma State	5	-

Finals
6	Texas A&M	4
1	Nebraska	7

- Kansas, Kansas State, and Missouri did not make the tournament.

== All-Tournament team ==
Position	Player	School
1B	Dan Johnson	Nebraska
2B	Nebassett Brown	Oklahoma State
3B	Jason Bartlett	Oklahoma
SS	Jake Brown	Iowa State
C	Kelly Shoppach	Baylor
OF	Jimbo McAuliff	Oklahoma State
OF	Jake Bollig	Oklahoma State
OF	John Cole	Nebraska
DH	Ben Himes	Texas A&M
DH	Matt Hopper	Nebraska
UT	Greg Dobbs	Oklahoma
P	Shane Komine	Nebraska
P	Chris French	Texas A&M
P	Chris Russ	Texas A&M
MOP	Dan Johnson	Nebraska

== See also ==
- College World Series
- NCAA Division I Baseball Championship
- Big 12 Conference baseball tournament
