= Big 12 Conference Baseball Pitcher of the Year =

Big 12 Pitcher of the Year
- Awarded for: the most outstanding baseball pitcher in the Big 12 Conference
- Country: United States
- Presented by: Phillips 66
- First award: 2001
- Currently held by: Maxx Yehl, West Virginia

The Big 12 Conference Pitcher of the Year is a baseball award given to the Big 12 Conference's most outstanding pitcher. The award was first given following the 2001 season. It is selected by the league's head coaches, who are not allowed to vote for their own players.

== Key ==
†	Co-Players of the Year
*	Awarded a national Player of the Year award: the Dick Howser Trophy or the Golden Spikes Award
Player (X)	Denotes the number of times the player had been awarded the Player of the Year award at that point

== Winners ==
Season	Player	School	Class	Reference
2001	Shane Komine	Nebraska	Junior	
2002	Justin Simmons	Texas	Sophomore	
2003	Aaron Marsden	Nebraska	Junior	
2004	J.P. Howell	Texas	Junior	
2005	Max Scherzer	Missouri	Sophomore	
2006	Kyle McCulloch	Texas	Junior	
2007	Adrian Alaniz	Texas	Junior	
2008	Aaron Crow	Missouri	Junior	
2009	A.J. Morris	Kansas State	Junior	
2010	Cole Green	Texas	Junior	
2011	Taylor Jungmann*	Texas	Junior	
2012	Andrew Heaney	Oklahoma State	Junior	
2013	Harrison Musgrave	West Virginia	Sophomore	
2014	Preston Morrison	TCU	Junior	
2015	Michael Freeman	Oklahoma State	Senior	
2016	Thomas Hatch	Oklahoma State	Sophomore	
2017	Steven Gingery	Texas Tech	Sophomore	
2018	Cody Bradford	Baylor	Sophomore	
2019	Alek Manoah	West Virginia	Junior	
2021	Ty Madden	Texas	Junior	
2022	Brandon Birdsell	Texas Tech	Junior	
2023	Lucas Gordon	Texas	Junior	
2024	Payton Tolle	TCU	Junior	
2025	Antoine Jean	Houston	Senior	
2026	Maxx Yehl	West Virginia	Junior	

== Winners by school ==
School (year joined)	Winners	Years
Texas (1996)^{d}	8	2002, 2004, 2006, 2007, 2010, 2011, 2021, 2023
Oklahoma State (1996)	3	2012, 2015, 2016
West Virginia (2012)	3	2013, 2019, 2026
Missouri (1996)^{c}	2	2005, 2008
Nebraska (1996)^{a}	2	2001, 2003
TCU (2012)	2	2014, 2024
Texas Tech (1996)	2	2017, 2022
Baylor (1996)	1	2018
Kansas State (1996)	1	2009
Houston (2023)	1	2025
Arizona (2024)	0	—
Arizona State (2024)	0	—
BYU (2023)	0	—
Cincinnati (2023)	0	—
Iowa State (1996)^{b}	0	—
Kansas (1996)	0	—
Oklahoma (1996)^{d}	0	—
Texas A&M (1996)^{c}	0	—
UCF (2023)	0	—
Utah (2024)	0	—

== Footnotes ==
- ^{a} Nebraska left in 2011 to join the Big Ten.
- ^{b} Iowa State discontinued its baseball program after the 2001 season.
- ^{c} Missouri and Texas A&M left in 2012 to join the SEC.
- ^{d} Oklahoma and Texas left in 2024 to join the SEC.
