= 2008 Big 12 Conference baseball tournament =

American college baseball tournament

- Teams: 8
- Format: Two four-team round-robin groups
- Finals site: AT&T Bricktown Ballpark; Oklahoma City, Oklahoma
- Champions: Texas (3rd title)
- Winning coach: Augie Garrido (3rd title)
- MVP: Brandon Belt (Texas)
- Attendance: 81,331

2008 Big 12 Conference baseball standings
	Conf.						Overall
Team	W		L		T	PCT	W		L		T	PCT
No. 10 Texas A&M ‍†‍‍^{y}	19	–	8	–	0	.704	46	–	19	–	0	.708
No. 18 Oklahoma State ‍‍‍^{y}	18	–	9	–	0	.667	44	–	18	–	0	.710
No. 22 Nebraska ‍‍‍^{y}	17	–	9	–	1	.648	41	–	16	–	1	.716
No. 21 Missouri ‍‍‍^{y}	16	–	11	–	0	.593	39	–	21	–	0	.650
No. 25 Texas ‍‍‡‍^{y}	15	–	12	–	0	.556	37	–	24	–	0	.607
Baylor ‍‍‍	11	–	16	–	0	.407	32	–	26	–	0	.552
Kansas State ‍‍‍	11	–	16	–	0	.407	29	–	29	–	0	.500
Oklahoma ‍‍‍^{y}	9	–	17	–	1	.352	36	–	26	–	1	.579
Kansas ‍‍‍	9	–	18	–	0	.333	30	–	27	–	0	.526
Texas Tech ‍‍‍	9	–	18	–	0	.333	25	–	30	–	0	.455
† – Conference champion ‡ – Tournament champion y – Invited to the NCAA tournament As of June 30, 2008; Rankings from Collegiate Baseball

The 2008 Big 12 Conference baseball tournament was held at AT&T Bricktown Ballpark in Oklahoma City, OK from May 21 to May 25, 2008. This was the third year the conference uses the round robin tournament setup. The winners of each group at the end of the round robin face each other in a one-game match for the championship.

== Regular season standings ==
Place	Seed	Team	Conference					Overall			
Place	Seed	Team	W	L	T	%	GB	W	L	T	%
1	1	Texas A&M	19	8	0	.704	–	46	19	0	.708
2	2	Oklahoma State	18	9	0	.667	1	44	18	0	.710
3	3	Nebraska	17	9	1	.648	1.5	41	16	1	.716
4	4	Missouri	16	11	0	.593	3	39	21	0	.650
5	5	Texas	15	12	0	.556	4	39	22	0	.639
6	6	Baylor	11	16	0	.407	8	32	26	0	.552
6	7	Kansas State	11	16	0	.407	8	29	29	0	.500
8	8	Oklahoma	9	17	1	.352	9.5	36	26	1	.579
9	–	Kansas	9	18	0	.333	10	30	27	0	.526
9	–	Texas Tech	9	18	0	.333	10	25	30	0	.455

- Colorado and Iowa State did not sponsor baseball teams.

== Tournament ==
	Division A	A&M	Mizzou	UT	OU	Overall
1	Texas A&M		6-2	9-15	1-4	1-2
4	Missouri	2-6		3-2*	3–4	1-2
5	Texas	15-9	2-3*		11-10	2-1
8	Oklahoma	4-1	4-3	10-11		2-1

	Division B	OSU	Neb	Bay	KSU	Overall
2	Oklahoma State		11-5	14-3	2–3	2-1
3	Nebraska	5–11		4–10	5-2	1-2
6	Baylor	3-14	10-4		2–3	1-2
7	Kansas State	3-2	2-5	3-2		2-1

Finals
A	Texas	15
B	Kansas State	7

- Texas Tech and Kansas did not make the tournament.
- Texas wins tiebreaker over Oklahoma by virtue of their 11–10 head to head win
- * 10 innings
- Kansas State wins tiebreaker over Oklahoma State by virtue of their 3–2 head to head win

== All-Tournament Team ==
Position	Player	School
1B	Brandon Belt	Texas
2B	Jake Opitz	Nebraska
3B	Nate Tenbrink	Kansas State
SS	Drew Biery	Kansas State
C	Luis Flores	Oklahoma State
OF	Jacob Priday	Missouri
OF	Jordan Danks	Texas
OF	Russell Moldenhauer	Texas
DH	Rebel Ridling	Oklahoma State
P	Daniel Edwards	Kansas State
P	Andrew Doyle	Oklahoma
MOP	Brandon Belt	Texas

== See also ==
- College World Series
- NCAA Division I Baseball Championship
- Big 12 Conference baseball tournament
