= 2003 Big 12 Conference baseball tournament =

American college baseball tournament

- Teams: 8
- Format: Double elimination
- Finals site: SBC Bricktown Ballpark; Oklahoma City, Oklahoma
- Champions: Texas (2nd title)
- Winning coach: Augie Garrido (2nd title)
- MVP: Dustin Majewski (Texas)
- Attendance: 86,629

2003 Big 12 Conference baseball standings
	Conf.				Overall
Team	W		L	PCT	W		L	PCT
No. 15 Nebraska ‍†‍‍^{y}	20	–	7	.741	47	–	18	.723
No. 17 Texas A&M ‍‍‍^{y}	19	–	8	.704	45	–	19	.703
No. 4 Texas ‍‍‡‍^{y}	19	–	8	.704	50	–	20	.714
Missouri ‍‍‍^{y}	15	–	11	.577	36	–	22	.621
No. 13 Baylor ‍‍‍^{y}	15	–	12	.556	45	–	23	.662
Oklahoma State ‍‍‍	14	–	13	.519	34	–	23	.596
Oklahoma ‍‍‍	10	–	17	.370	23	–	31	.426
Kansas ‍‍‍	9	–	18	.333	35	–	28	.556
Texas Tech ‍‍‍	8	–	18	.308	30	–	25	.545
Kansas State ‍‍‍	5	–	22	.185	15	–	37	.288
† – Conference champion ‡ – Tournament champion y – Invited to the NCAA tournament As of June 30, 2003; Rankings from Collegiate Baseball

The 2003 Big 12 Conference baseball tournament was once again held at AT&T Bricktown Ballpark in Oklahoma City, OK (after a one-year hiatus) from May 21 through 25. Texas won their second consecutive tournament and earned the Big 12 Conference's automatic bid to the 2003 NCAA Division I baseball tournament. The tournament mirrored the format of the College World Series, with two 4-team double-elimination brackets and a final championship game.

== Regular Season Standings ==
Place	Seed	Team	Conference				Overall		
Place	Seed	Team	W	L	%	GB	W	L	%
1	1	Nebraska	20	7	.741	–	47	18	.723
2	2	Texas A&M	19	8	.704	1	45	19	.703
2	3	Texas	19	8	.704	1	50	20	.714
4	4	Missouri	15	11	.577	4.5	36	22	.621
5	5	Baylor	15	12	.556	5	45	23	.662
6	6	Oklahoma State	14	13	.519	6	34	24	.586
7	7	Oklahoma	10	17	.370	10	23	31	.426
8	8	Kansas	9	18	.333	11	35	28	.556
9	–	Texas Tech	8	18	.308	11.5	30	25	.545
10	–	Kansas State	5	22	.185	15	15	37	.288

- Colorado and Iowa State did not sponsor baseball teams.

== Tournament ==
First round
3	Texas	10
6	Oklahoma State	7
2	Texas A&M	11
7	Oklahoma	2
6	Oklahoma State	2
7	Oklahoma	4
5	Baylor	11
4	Missouri	0
1	Nebraska	9
8	Kansas	4
4	Missouri	4*
8	Kansas	3*

Second round
3	Texas	2
2	Texas A&M	3
7	Oklahoma	4
3	Texas	5
5	Baylor	5
1	Nebraska	9
4	Missouri	8
5	Baylor	9

Semifinals
2	Texas A&M	7	4
3	Texas	9	13
1	Nebraska	5*	2
5	Baylor	7*	6

Finals
3	Texas	10*
5	Baylor	8*

- * indicates extra-inning game.
- Kansas State and Texas Tech did not make the tournament.

== All-Tournament team ==
Position	Player	School
1B	Mark Saccomanno	Baylor
2B	Tim Moss	Texas
3B	Alex Gordon	Nebraska
SS	Omar Quintanilla	Texas
C	Josh Ford	Baylor
OF	Dustin Majewski	Texas
OF	David Murphy	Baylor
OF	Joe Ferin	Texas
DH	Seth Johnston	Texas
UT	Scott Beerer	Texas A&M
SP	Steven White	Baylor
SP	Mark McCormick	Baylor
Co-P	Huston Street	Texas
Co-RP	Zane Carlson	Baylor
MOP	Dustin Majewski	Texas

== See also ==
- College World Series
- NCAA Division I Baseball Championship
- Big 12 Conference baseball tournament
