= 2004 Big 12 Conference baseball tournament =

American college baseball tournament

- Teams: 8
- Format: Double elimination
- Finals site: Ameriquest Field in Arlington; Arlington, Texas
- Champions: Oklahoma State (1st title)
- Winning coach: Frank Anderson (1st title)
- MVP: Cody Ehlers (Missouri)
- Attendance: 125,628

2004 Big 12 Conference baseball standings
| | Conf. | | | | | | Overall |
| Team | W | | L | | T | PCT | W | | L | | T | PCT |
|---|---|---|---|---|---|---|---|---|---|---|---|---|
| No. 2 Texas ‍†‍‍^{y} | 19 | – | 7 | – | 0 | .731 | 58 | – | 15 | – | 0 | .795 |
| Oklahoma ‍‍‍^{y} | 19 | – | 8 | – | 0 | .704 | 38 | – | 24 | – | 0 | .613 |
| Texas Tech ‍‍‍^{y} | 17 | – | 9 | – | 0 | .654 | 40 | – | 21 | – | 0 | .656 |
| Oklahoma State ‍‍‡‍^{y} | 15 | – | 11 | – | 0 | .577 | 38 | – | 24 | – | 0 | .613 |
| No. 16 Texas A&M ‍‍‍^{y} | 14 | – | 12 | – | 0 | .538 | 42 | – | 22 | – | 0 | .656 |
| Baylor ‍‍‍ | 13 | – | 12 | – | 0 | .520 | 29 | – | 31 | – | 0 | .483 |
| Missouri ‍‍‍^{y} | 12 | – | 14 | – | 0 | .462 | 38 | – | 23 | – | 1 | .621 |
| Nebraska ‍‍‍ | 11 | – | 16 | – | 0 | .407 | 36 | – | 23 | – | 0 | .610 |
| Kansas ‍‍‍ | 7 | – | 19 | – | 0 | .269 | 31 | – | 31 | – | 1 | .500 |
| Kansas State ‍‍‍ | 4 | – | 23 | – | 0 | .148 | 26 | – | 30 | – | 0 | .464 |
† – Conference champion ‡ – Tournament champion y – Invited to the NCAA tournament As of June 30, 2004; Rankings from Collegiate Baseball

The 2004 Big 12 Conference baseball tournament was held at Ameriquest Field in Arlington in Arlington, Texas, from May 26 through 30. The Cowboys of Oklahoma State University won their first tournament and earned the Big 12 Conference's automatic bid to the 2004 NCAA Division I baseball tournament. The tournament mirrored the format of the College World Series, with two 4-team double-elimination brackets and a final championship game.

== Regular season standings ==
| Place | Seed | Team | Conference | | | | | Overall | | | |
| Place | Seed | Team | W | L | T | % | GB | W | L | T | % |
|---|---|---|---|---|---|---|---|---|---|---|---|
| 1 | 1 | Texas | 19 | 7 | 0 | .731 | – | 58 | 15 | 0 | .795 |
| 2 | 2 | Oklahoma | 19 | 8 | 0 | .704 | 0.5 | 38 | 24 | 0 | .613 |
| 3 | 3 | Texas Tech | 17 | 9 | 0 | .654 | 2 | 40 | 21 | 0 | .656 |
| 4 | 4 | Oklahoma State | 15 | 11 | 0 | .577 | 4 | 38 | 24 | 0 | .613 |
| 5 | 5 | Texas A&M | 14 | 12 | 0 | .538 | 5 | 42 | 22 | 0 | .656 |
| 6 | 6 | Baylor | 13 | 12 | 0 | .520 | 5.5 | 29 | 31 | 0 | .483 |
| 7 | 7 | Missouri | 12 | 14 | 0 | .462 | 7 | 38 | 23 | 1 | .621 |
| 8 | 8 | Nebraska | 11 | 16 | 0 | .407 | 8.5 | 36 | 23 | 0 | .610 |
| 9 | – | Kansas | 7 | 19 | 0 | .269 | 12 | 31 | 31 | 1 | .500 |
| 10 | – | Kansas State | 4 | 23 | 0 | .148 | 15.5 | 26 | 30 | 0 | .464 |

- Colorado and Iowa State did not sponsor baseball teams.

== Tournament ==
First round
6 | Baylor | 8
3 | Texas Tech | 3
7 | Missouri | 9
2 | Oklahoma | 5
3 | Texas Tech | 1
2 | Oklahoma | 3
4 | Oklahoma State | 6
5 | Texas A&M | 5
8 | Nebraska | 5
1 | Texas | 2
5 | Texas A&M | 6
1 | Texas | 13

Second round
6 | Baylor | 1
7 | Missouri | 12
2 | Oklahoma | 4
6 | Baylor | 14
4 | Oklahoma State | 7
8 | Nebraska | 1
1 | Texas | 6
8 | Nebraska | 5

Semifinals
7 | Missouri | 10 | -
6 | Baylor | 7 | -
4 | Oklahoma State | 8 | -
1 | Texas | 2 | -

Finals
7 | Missouri | 9
4 | Oklahoma State | 10*

- 13 innings.
- Kansas and Kansas State did not make the tournament.

== All-Tournament Team ==
| Position | Player | School |
|---|---|---|
| 1B | Cody Ehlers | Missouri |
| 2B | Rusty Ryal | Oklahoma State |
| 3B | Josh Fields | Oklahoma State |
| SS | Chris Gutierrez | Oklahoma State |
| C | Jason Jaramillo | Oklahoma State |
| OF | Mike Pankratz | Baylor |
| OF | James Boone | Missouri |
| OF | Lee Laskowski | Missouri |
| DH | Chad Steele | Nebraska |
| UT | Curtis Thigpen | Texas |
| P | Spencer Grogan | Oklahoma State |
| P | Garrett Broshuis | Missouri |
| P | Mark Alexander | Missouri |
| MOP | Cody Ehlers | Missouri |

== See also ==
- College World Series
- NCAA Division I Baseball Championship
- Big 12 Conference baseball tournament
