= Cole Green (baseball) =

American baseball player

Rockford Aviators
- Pitcher
- Born: May 4, 1989 (age 37); Wichita Falls, Texas, U.S.
- Bats: Right Throws: Right
- Stats at Baseball Reference

Mitch Coleman Green (born May 4, 1989) is an American former professional baseball pitcher in the Cincinnati Reds organization.

Green attended Coppell High School in Coppell, Texas. He went on to attend the University of Texas at Austin, where he played for the Texas Longhorns baseball team. As a freshman, Green earned honorable mention All-Big 12 Conference honors. In 2009, he played collegiate summer baseball with the Wareham Gatemen of the Cape Cod Baseball League. Green had a breakout year as a junior, earning first-team All-Big 12 honors, winning Big 12 Conference Baseball Pitcher of the Year, and earning second-team ABCA All-American honors and first-team All-American honors from Collegiate Baseball Newspaper. Green was drafted by the Detroit Tigers in the fourth round of the 2010 Major League Baseball draft, but decided to return to Texas for his senior season where he again earned honorable mention All-Big 12 honors.

Green was drafted in the ninth round by the Cincinnati Reds in the 2011 Major League Baseball draft. He split the 2011 season between the Arizona League Reds and the Billings Mustangs.

Green was suspended by Major League Baseball for the first 50 games of the 2012 season after testing positive for Methylhexaneamine.

Green in September 2013 would become a Manager at MCG Drilling & Completing

Green would become a company owner at Cattle Co in May 2020
