= 1998 Big 12 Conference baseball tournament =

American college baseball tournament

- Teams: 6
- Format: Double elimination
- Finals site: AT&T Bricktown Ballpark; Oklahoma City, Oklahoma
- Champions: Texas Tech (1st title)
- Winning coach: Larry Hays (1st title)
- MVP: Josh Bard (Texas Tech)
- Attendance: 113,108

1998 Big 12 Conference baseball standings
	Conf.						Overall
Team	W		L		T	PCT	W		L		T	PCT
No. 14 Texas A&M ‍†‍‍^{y}	21	–	9	–	0	.700	46	–	20	–	0	.697
No. 28 Baylor ‍‍‍^{y}	18	–	10	–	0	.643	41	–	20	–	1	.669
No. 29 Texas Tech ‍‍‡‍^{y}	18	–	11	–	0	.621	44	–	20	–	0	.688
No. 22 Oklahoma ‍‍‍^{y}	17	–	11	–	0	.607	42	–	20	–	0	.677
Missouri ‍‍‍	17	–	12	–	0	.586	36	–	18	–	0	.667
Oklahoma State ‍‍‍^{y}	15	–	12	–	0	.556	40	–	21	–	0	.656
Nebraska ‍‍‍	10	–	13	–	0	.435	24	–	20	–	0	.545
Texas ‍‍‍	11	–	18	–	0	.379	23	–	32	–	1	.420
Iowa State ‍‍‍	10	–	18	–	0	.357	20	–	27	–	0	.426
Kansas State ‍‍‍	9	–	19	–	0	.321	20	–	32	–	0	.385
Kansas ‍‍‍	7	–	20	–	0	.259	22	–	29	–	0	.431
† – Conference champion ‡ – Tournament champion y – Invited to the NCAA tournament As of June 30, 1998; Rankings from Collegiate Baseball

The 1998 Big 12 Conference baseball tournament was the second played in Big 12 history, and the first to be held at AT&T Bricktown Ballpark in Oklahoma City, OK from May 14 through 17. Texas Tech won the tournament and earned the Big 12 Conference's automatic bid to the 1998 NCAA Division I baseball tournament. The format followed that used by the NCAA Division I Baseball Championship at the time: a six-team, double-elimination tournament.

== Regular season standings ==
Place	Seed	Team	Conference					Overall			
Place	Seed	Team	W	L	T	%	GB	W	L	T	%
1	1	Texas A&M	21	9	0	.700	–	46	20	0	.697
2	2	Baylor	18	10	0	.643	2	41	20	1	.669
3	3	Texas Tech	18	11	0	.621	2.5	44	20	0	.688
4	4	Oklahoma	17	11	0	.607	3	42	20	0	.677
5	5	Missouri	17	12	0	.586	3.5	36	18	0	.667
6	6	Oklahoma State	15	12	0	.556	4.5	40	21	0	.656
7	–	Nebraska	10	13	0	.435	7.5	24	20	0	.545
8	–	Texas	11	18	0	.379	9.5	23	32	1	.420
9	–	Iowa State	10	18	0	.357	10	20	27	0	.426
10	–	Kansas State	9	19	0	.321	11	20	32	0	.385
11	–	Kansas	7	20	0	.259	12.5	22	29	0	.431

- Colorado did not sponsor a baseball team.

== Tournament ==
First round
1	Texas A&M	4
6	Oklahoma State	3
2	Baylor	7
5	Missouri	3
3	Texas Tech	5
4	Oklahoma	1

Second round
1	Texas A&M	4
4	Oklahoma	10
6	Oklahoma State	11
5	Missouri	8
2	Baylor	4
3	Texas Tech	11
1	Texas A&M	8
2	Baylor	5

Third round
4	Oklahoma	9
6	Oklahoma State	4
3	Texas Tech	7
1	Texas A&M	11

Semifinals
4	Oklahoma	3
3	Texas Tech	4

Final
3	Texas Tech	14
1	Texas A&M	7

- Iowa State, Kansas, Kansas State, Nebraska, and Texas did not make the tournament.

== All-Tournament team ==
Position	Player	School
1B	Charley Carter	Baylor
2B	Keith Ginter	Texas Tech
3B	Craig Kuzmic	Texas A&M
SS	Steve Scarborough	Texas A&M
C	Josh Bard	Texas Tech
OF	Jason Landreth	Texas Tech
OF	Jason Tyner	Texas A&M
OF	Daylan Holt	Texas A&M
DH	Brennan Burns	Texas Tech
DH	Richard Park	Oklahoma
P	Ryan Rupe	Texas A&M
P	Chris Scarcella	Texas A&M
P	Shane Wright	Texas Tech
MOP	Josh Bard	Texas Tech

== See also ==
- College World Series
- NCAA Division I Baseball Championship
- Big 12 Conference baseball tournament
