= 1997 Big 12 Conference baseball tournament =

American college baseball tournament

- Teams: 6
- Format: Double elimination
- Finals site: All Sports Stadium; Oklahoma City, Oklahoma
- Champions: Oklahoma (1st title)
- Winning coach: Larry Cochell (1st title)
- MVP: Brian Shackelford (Oklahoma)
- Attendance: 56,742

1997 Big 12 Conference baseball standings
| | Conf. | | | | Overall |
| Team | W | | L | PCT | W | | L | PCT |
|---|---|---|---|---|---|---|---|---|
| Texas Tech ‍†‍‍^{y} | 23 | – | 7 | .767 | 46 | – | 14 | .767 |
| No. 12 Oklahoma State ‍‍‍^{y} | 21 | – | 9 | .700 | 46 | – | 19 | .708 |
| No. 26 Texas A&M ‍‍‍^{y} | 19 | – | 11 | .633 | 39 | – | 22 | .639 |
| No. 17 Oklahoma ‍‍‡‍^{y} | 18 | – | 11 | .621 | 39 | – | 20 | .661 |
| Baylor ‍‍‍ | 18 | – | 12 | .600 | 32 | – | 23 | .582 |
| Missouri ‍‍‍ | 15 | – | 16 | .484 | 31 | – | 27 | .534 |
| Texas ‍‍‍ | 12 | – | 15 | .444 | 29 | – | 22 | .569 |
| Kansas ‍‍‍ | 12 | – | 18 | .400 | 31 | – | 25 | .554 |
| Kansas State ‍‍‍ | 10 | – | 20 | .333 | 32 | – | 24 | .571 |
| Nebraska ‍‍‍ | 7 | – | 23 | .233 | 27 | – | 35 | .435 |
| Iowa State ‍‍‍ | 6 | – | 21 | .222 | 12 | – | 31 | .279 |
† – Conference champion ‡ – Tournament champion y – Invited to the NCAA tournament As of June 30, 1997; Rankings from Collegiate Baseball

The 1997 Big 12 Conference baseball tournament was the first in Big 12 history, and the only one to be held at All Sports Stadium in Oklahoma City, OK from May 15 through 18. Oklahoma won the inaugural tournament and earned the Big 12 Conference's automatic bid to the 1997 NCAA Division I baseball tournament. The format followed that used by the NCAA Division I Baseball Championship at the time: a six-team, double-elimination tournament.

== Regular Season Standings ==
| Place | Seed | Team | Conference | | | | Overall | | |
| Place | Seed | Team | W | L | % | GB | W | L | % |
|---|---|---|---|---|---|---|---|---|---|
| 1 | 1 | Texas Tech | 23 | 7 | .767 | – | 46 | 14 | .767 |
| 2 | 2 | Oklahoma State | 21 | 9 | .700 | 2 | 46 | 19 | .708 |
| 3 | 3 | Texas A&M | 19 | 11 | .633 | 4 | 39 | 22 | .639 |
| 4 | 4 | Oklahoma | 18 | 11 | .621 | 4.5 | 39 | 20 | .661 |
| 5 | 5 | Baylor | 18 | 12 | .600 | 5 | 32 | 23 | .582 |
| 6 | 6 | Missouri | 15 | 16 | .484 | 8.5 | 31 | 27 | .534 |
| 7 | – | Texas | 12 | 15 | .444 | 9.5 | 29 | 22 | .569 |
| 8 | – | Kansas | 12 | 18 | .400 | 11 | 31 | 25 | .554 |
| 9 | – | Kansas State | 10 | 20 | .333 | 13 | 32 | 24 | .571 |
| 10 | – | Nebraska | 7 | 23 | .233 | 16 | 27 | 35 | .435 |
| 11 | – | Iowa State | 6 | 21 | .222 | 15.5 | 21 | 31 | .404 |

- Colorado did not sponsor a baseball team.

== Tournament ==
First round
1 | Texas Tech | 12
6 | Missouri | 2
2 | Oklahoma State | 11
5 | Baylor | 8
3 | Texas A&M | 11
4 | Oklahoma | 3

Second round
1 | Texas Tech | 3
4 | Oklahoma | 5
6 | Missouri | 9
5 | Baylor | 8
2 | Oklahoma State | 16
3 | Texas A&M | 10
1 | Texas Tech | 9
3 | Texas A&M | 6

Third round
4 | Oklahoma | 16
6 | Missouri | 7
2 | Oklahoma State | 6
1 | Texas Tech | 7

Semifinals
4 | Oklahoma | 10
2 | Oklahoma State | 5

Final
4 | Oklahoma | 19
1 | Texas Tech | 17

- Iowa State, Kansas, Kansas State, Nebraska, and Texas did not make the tournament.

== All-Tournament Team ==
| Position | Player | School |
|---|---|---|
| 1B | Joe Dillon | Texas Tech |
| 2B | Corey Hart | Oklahoma |
| 3B | Sean Heaney | Texas A&M |
| SS | Derek Wathan | Oklahoma |
| C | Javier Flores | Oklahoma |
| OF | Rusty McNamara | Oklahoma State |
| OF | Brian Shackelford | Oklahoma |
| OF | Brandon Toro | Texas Tech |
| DH | Jason Landreth | Texas Tech |
| P | Matt Blank | Texas A&M |
| P | Jason Gooding | Texas Tech |
| P | Jeff Andra | Oklahoma |
| MOP | Brian Shackelford | Oklahoma |

== See also ==
- College World Series
- NCAA Division I Baseball Championship
- Big 12 Conference baseball tournament
