= Kelly Shoppach =

American baseball player (born 1980)

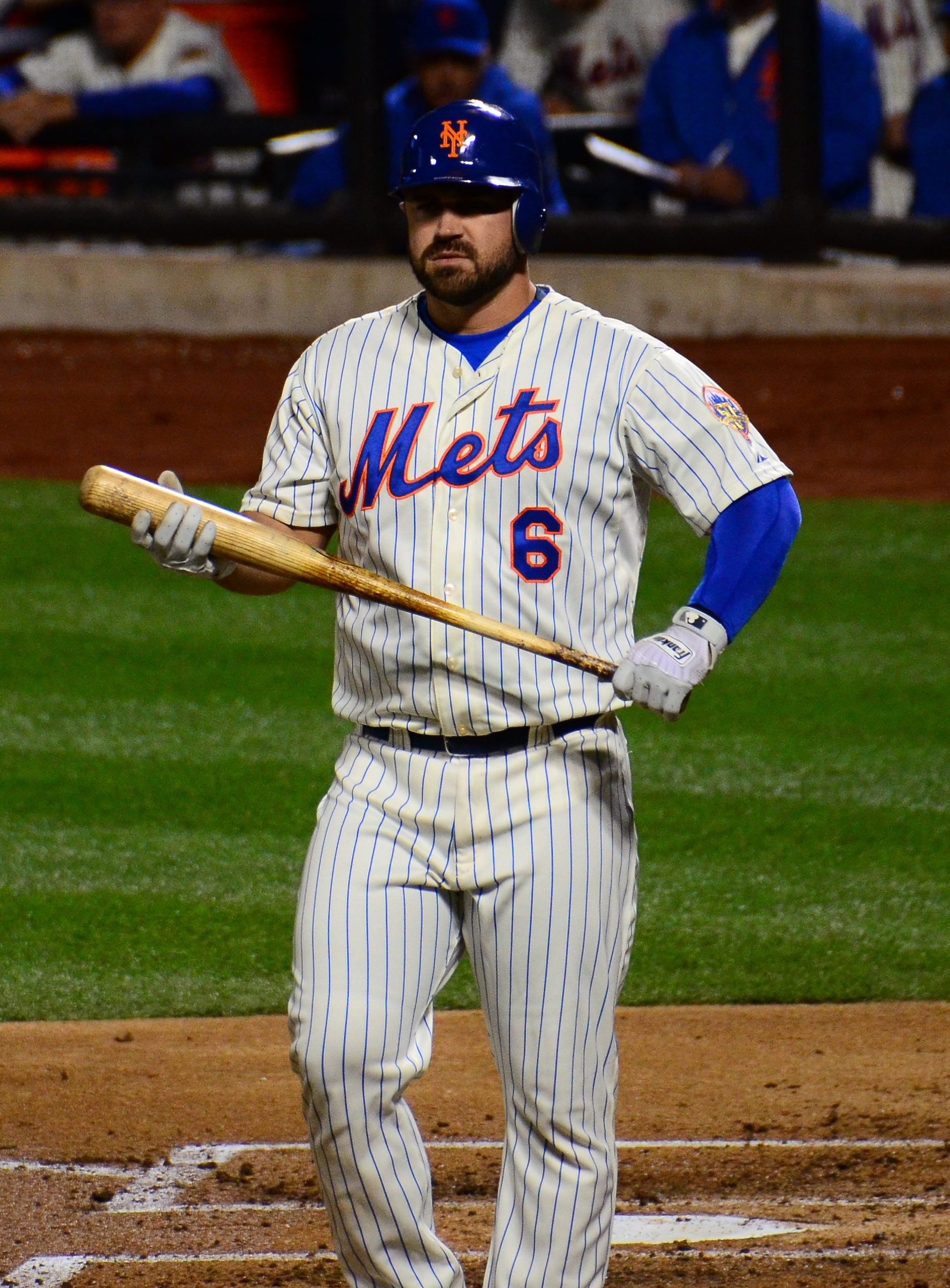
- Shoppach with the Mets in 2012
- Catcher
- Born: April 29, 1980 (age 46); Fort Worth, Texas, U.S.
- Batted: Right Threw: Right

MLB debut
- May 28, 2005, for the Boston Red Sox

Last MLB appearance
- September 12, 2013, for the Cleveland Indians

MLB statistics
- Batting average: .223
- Home runs: 70
- Runs batted in: 216
- Stats at Baseball Reference

Teams
- Boston Red Sox (2005); Cleveland Indians (2006–2009); Tampa Bay Rays (2010–2011); Boston Red Sox (2012); New York Mets (2012); Seattle Mariners (2013); Cleveland Indians (2013)

Kelly Brian Shoppach born April 29, 1980) is an American former professional baseball catcher. He played in Major League Baseball (MLB) for the Boston Red Sox, Cleveland Indians, Tampa Bay Rays, New York Mets, Seattle Mariners, and Pittsburgh Pirates.

== High school career ==
Shoppach attended Brewer High School in White Settlement, Texas, and was a student and a letterman in baseball and football. In football, he played quarterback, running back and linebacker, was a three-time all-district selection and as a senior, he was named the district's most valuable player.

== College career ==
Shoppach attended Baylor University, where he played three seasons of college baseball for the Baylor Bears baseball team. For the Bears, he hit .333 (168-for-505) with 26 home runs and 121 RBIs. He recorded a .993 career fielding percentage, with seven errors in 953 total chances. In 2000, he played collegiate summer baseball with the Harwich Mariners of the Cape Cod Baseball League.

Shoppach began his junior season in 2001 by being named the Most Outstanding Player of the Houston College Classic. He hit .397 with 12 home runs and 61 RBI in 69 games for the season. He also posted a .998 fielding percentage with only one error in 406 chances. After the season, Shoppach received the Johnny Bench Award as the nation's top collegiate catcher.

In addition to being selected "Big 12 Player of the Year", Shoppach was named First Team All-America in 2001 by Baseball America, Baseball Weekly, Louisville Slugger/Collegiate Baseball and the National Collegiate Baseball Writers Association.

== Professional career ==
=== Boston Red Sox ===
The Boston Red Sox selected Shoppach in the second round (48th overall) of the 2001 Major League Baseball draft. He made his professional debut in 2002 for the Single-A Sarasota Red Sox, batting .271 with 10 home runs and 66 RBI in 116 games. Shoppach was promoted to the Double-A Portland Sea Dogs in 2003, and hit .282 with 12 home runs and 60 RBI in 92 games. In 2004, playing for the Triple-A Pawtucket Red Sox in the International League, Shoppach appeared in a career-best 101 games behind the plate for Pawtucket and threw out 35 of 101 potential base stealers (34.7 percent) on his way to a spot on the International League's end-of-season All-Star Team. He also set a single-season home run record for Pawtucket catchers with 21 and also hit one as a designated hitter. His 22 homers matched his previous career total over two years and 208 games. Shoppach added career bests with 62 runs scored and a .461 slugging percentage. 47 of his 93 hits (51 percent) went for extra bases.

On May 26, 2005, Shoppach was recalled from Pawtucket. He made his major league debut on May 28 against the New York Yankees, appearing as a seventh-inning defensive replacement at catcher. In his first career plate appearance, Shoppach was hit by a pitch from Yankees pitcher Buddy Groom. Shoppach appeared in nine games with Boston, and was hitless in 15 at-bats with seven strikeouts. Shoppach spent most of the season with Pawtucket, hitting .253 with 26 home runs and 75 RBI in 102 games.

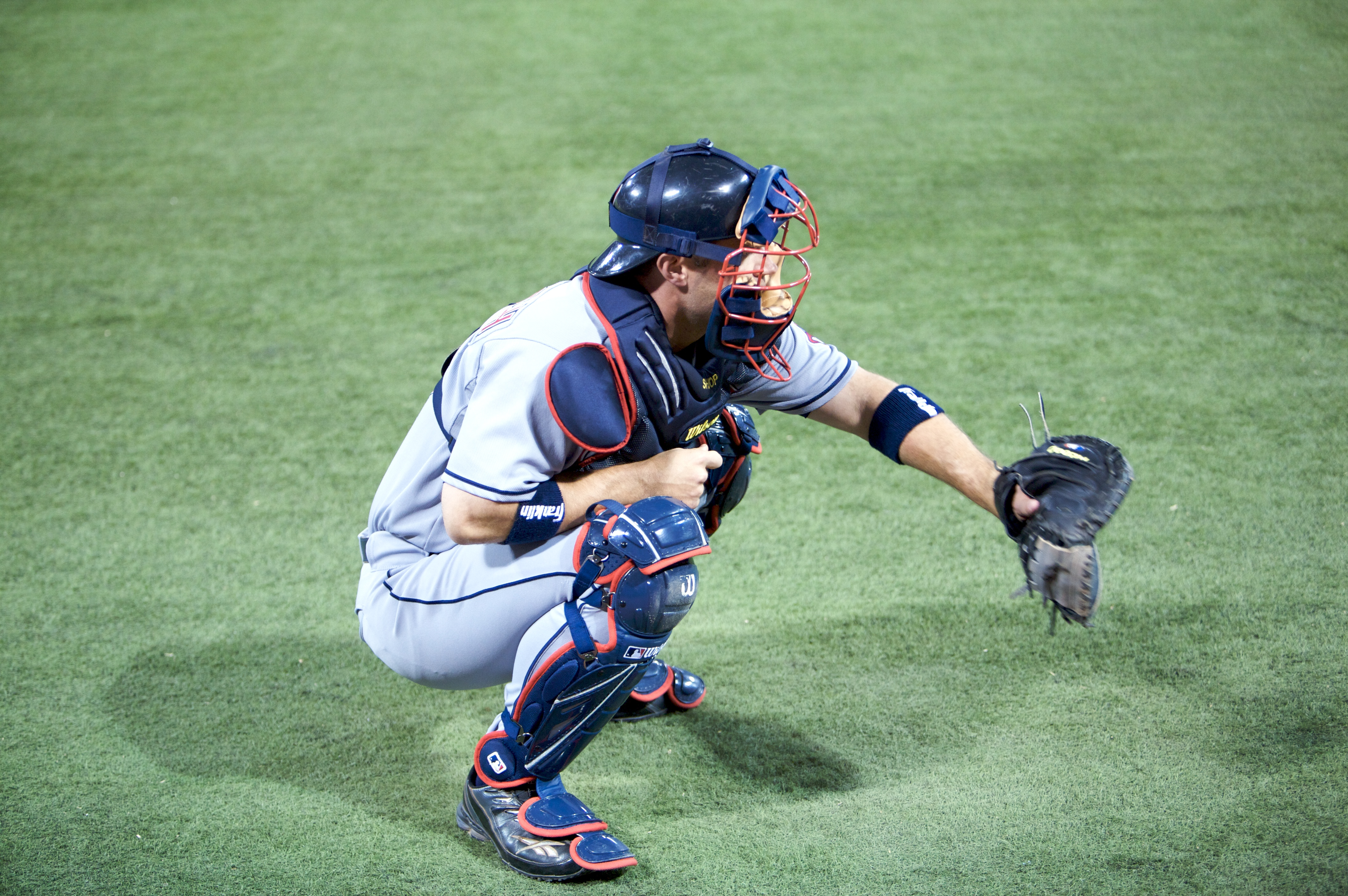
Shoppach playing for the Cleveland Indians in 2008.

=== Cleveland Indians ===
On January 27, 2006, Shoppach was traded from the Red Sox to the Cleveland Indians, along with third base prospect Andy Marte, pitcher Guillermo Mota, a player to be named later, and cash considerations. The Indians in turn sent outfielder Coco Crisp, catcher Josh Bard, and pitcher David Riske to the Red Sox. The Indians received minor league pitcher Randy Newsom from the Red Sox to complete the trade.

Shoppach became the personal catcher for Paul Byrd during his time in Cleveland. He split the 2006 season between Cleveland and the Triple-A Buffalo Bisons. In 41 games with the Indians, he batted .245 with three home runs and 16 RBI. With Buffalo, he hit .289 with four home runs and 9 RBI in 21 games.

Shoppach began the 2007 season by playing well, batting over .400 in both May and June. He finished the first half with a .330 batting average. On June 26, Shoppach hit a pinch-hit three-run walk-off home run to defeat the Oakland Athletics 8–5. In 59 games, he hit .261 with seven home runs and 30 RBI. In the postseason, Shoppach started alongside Byrd in Game 4 of the 2007 American League Division Series, finishing the game 2-for-3 with two doubles, a run scored and HBP in Cleveland's 6–4 series-winning victory. He again caught for Byrd in Game 4 of the 2007 American League Championship Series, and finished the game 1-for-3 in a 7–3 win over the Boston Red Sox.

During the 2008 season, Shoppach saw more playing time due to injuries to Víctor Martínez. On July 30, he became the second American League player in history, and ninth player overall in Major League Baseball, to record five extra-base hits in a game. He had three doubles and two home runs (including a game-tying HR in the ninth inning) against the Detroit Tigers. He came to bat twice in extra innings with a chance to get a sixth extra-base hit, but he was intentionally walked in the 10th and struck out in the 12th inning. The Indians lost, 14–12, in 13 innings. Shoppach finished the season batting .261 with 21 home runs and 55 RBI in 112 games. He set career highs in nearly every offensive category during the season.

On April 16, 2009, Shoppach drove in the first-ever run at the new Yankee Stadium, hitting a fourth-inning double to drive in Ben Francisco. In 89 games, he hit .214 with 12 home runs and 40 RBI while leading the American League in HBP (18).

=== Tampa Bay Rays ===
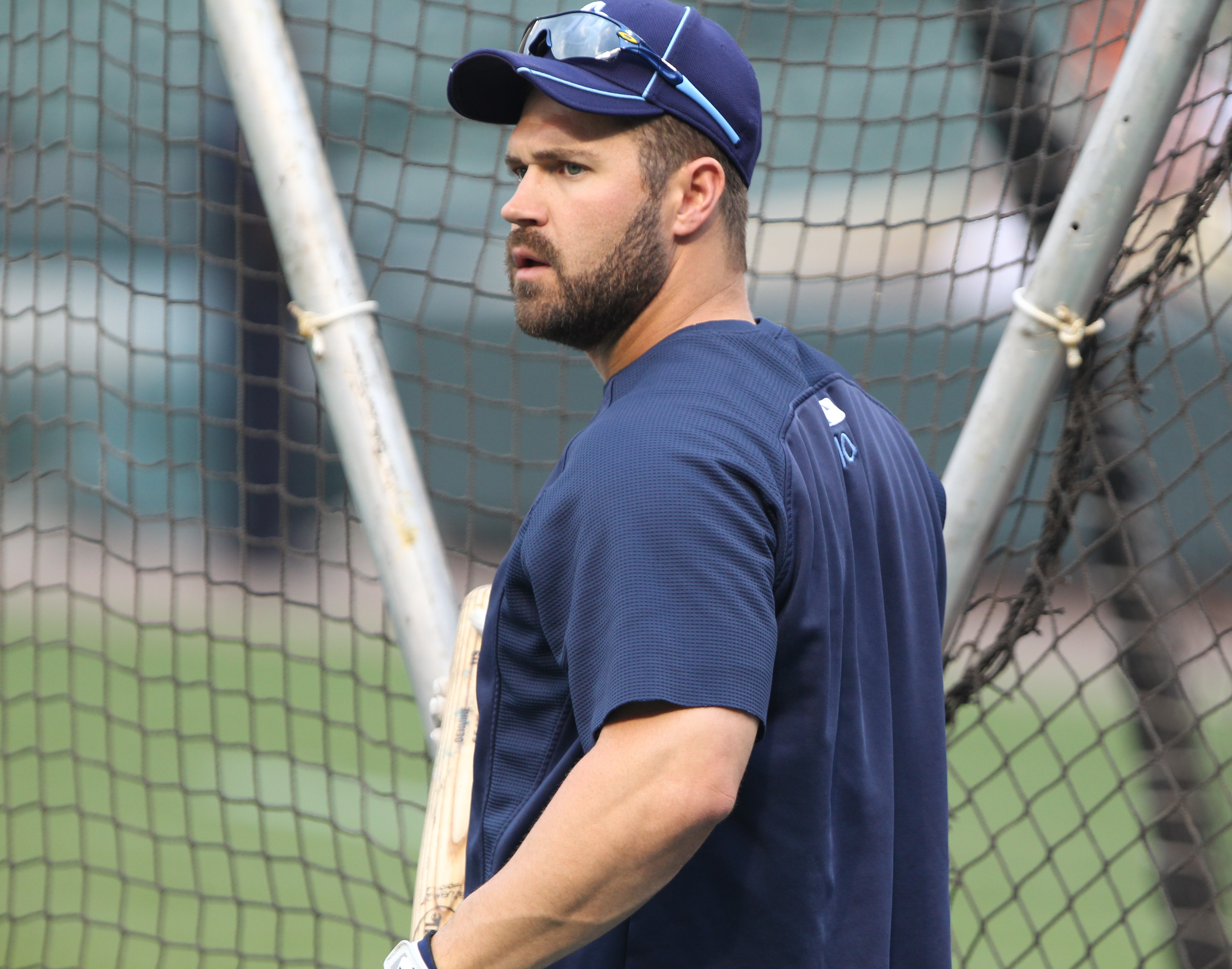
Shoppach with the Tampa Bay Rays in 2011.

On December 1, 2009, Shoppach was traded from the Cleveland Indians to the Tampa Bay Rays for pitcher Mitch Talbot.

On July 26, 2010, Shoppach caught a no-hitter thrown by Rays' pitcher Matt Garza. He played in 63 games for the Rays in 2010, batting .196 with five home runs and 17 RBI. In the postseason, Shoppach was 0-for-9 with a walk and three strikeouts as the Rays lost in the 2010 ALDS to the Texas Rangers.

In 2011, Shoppach batted .176 with 11 home runs and 22 RBI in 87 games. On September 30, Shoppach hit two home runs, accounting for 5 RBI in Game 1 of the 2011 American League Division Series against the Texas Rangers. He batted .400 overall in the series, but the Rays lost the series in four games.

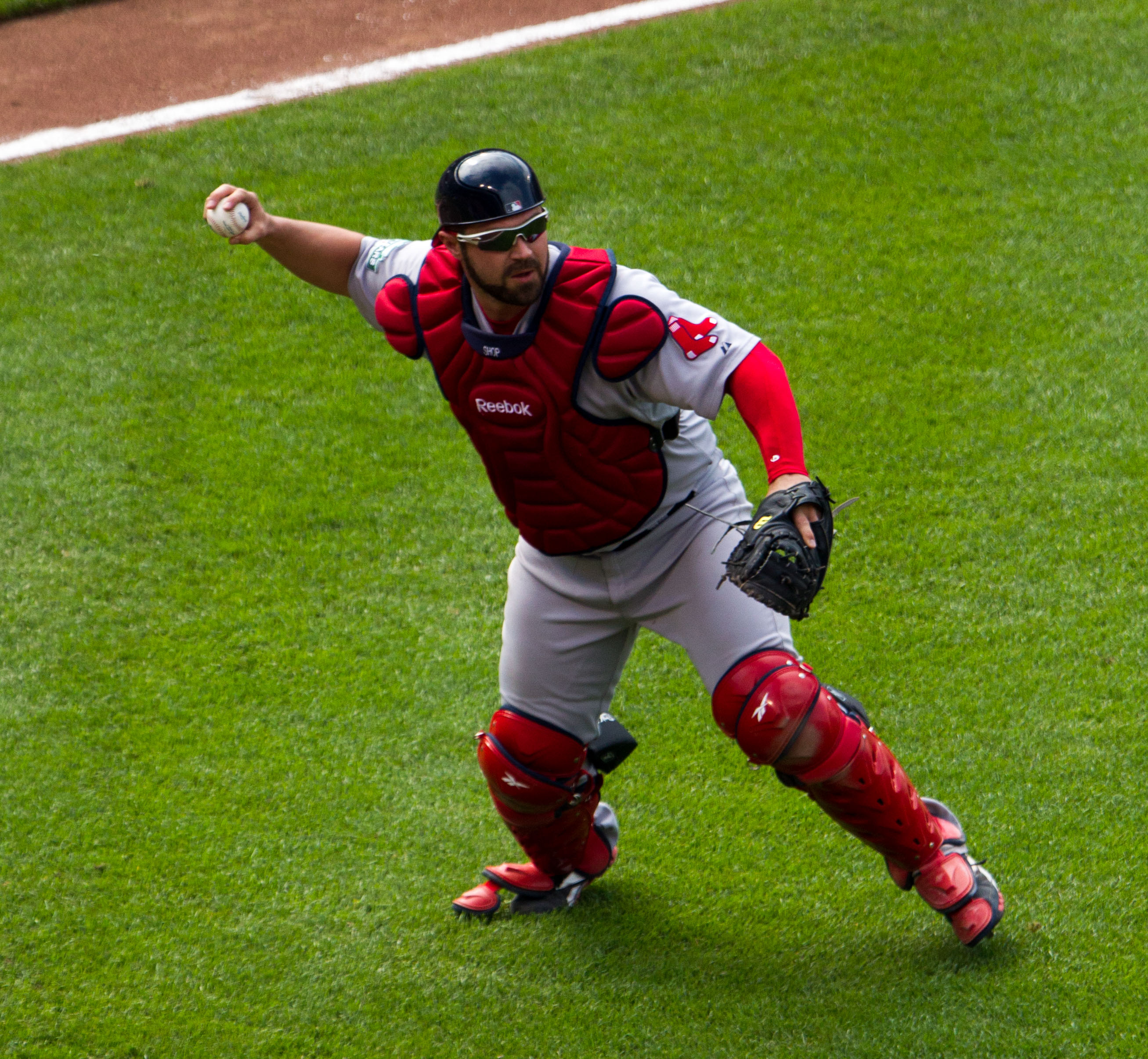
Shoppach playing for the Boston Red Sox in 2012.

=== Boston Red Sox (second stint) ===
On December 13, 2011, Shoppach signed a one-year, $1.35 million contract with the Red Sox with up to $400,000 in incentives. He began serving as the backup to Jarrod Saltalamacchia, replacing retired Red Sox captain Jason Varitek and allowing prospect Ryan Lavarnway to return to the Triple-A Pawtucket Red Sox to further his minor league development. Shoppach batted .250 with five home runs and 17 RBI in 48 games with Boston.

=== New York Mets ===
On August 14, 2012, Shoppach was traded from the Red Sox to the New York Mets for a player to be named later, later identified as Pedro Beato. On August 16, Shoppach hit his first home run as a Met in a 6–4 loss to the Washington Nationals. In 28 games with the Mets, he hit .203 with three home runs and 10 RBI. He became a free agent following the season.

=== Seattle Mariners ===
On January 29, 2013, Shoppach agreed to a one-year contract with the Seattle Mariners. The deal became official on February 7. He was designated for assignment on June 14 after Henry Blanco was signed. In 35 games with Seattle, Shoppach batted only .196 with three home runs and 9 RBI. He was given his release on June 20.

=== Washington Nationals ===
On July 5, 2013, Shoppach signed a minor league contract with the Washington Nationals, and was assigned to the Triple-A Syracuse Chiefs. He opted out of his contract and became a free agent July 31.

=== Pittsburgh Pirates ===
On August 12, 2013, Shoppach signed a minor league contract with the Pittsburgh Pirates, and was assigned to the Triple-A Indianapolis Indians. He was released August 28.

=== Cleveland Indians (second stint) ===
On August 30, 2013, Shoppach signed a minor league contract with the Cleveland Indians. He was added to the major league roster on September 1. On September 12, Shoppach played in his final major league game, going 0-for-2 in a 14–3 win over the Chicago White Sox. He became a free agent after the 2013 season.

== Awards and highlights ==
- Portland Sea Dogs player of the year (2003)
- International League All-Star (2004)
- Red Sox Minor League Defensive Player of the Month (April 2005)
- 2005 Pawtucket Red Sox Player of the Year
- Led AL in Hit By Pitch (2009)
- Caught Matt Garza's no-hitter (July 26, 2010)
- Ninth player to record five extra-base hits in a game (July 30, 2008)
