= Steven Gingery =

American baseball player (born 1997)

- Pitcher
- Born: September 23, 1997 (age 28); Huntington Beach, California, U.S.
- Bats: Right Throws: Left
- Stats at Baseball Reference

Steven Michael Gingery (born September 23, 1997) is an American former professional baseball pitcher.

== Career ==
Gingery attended Marina High School in Huntington Beach, California. As a senior, he had a 2–4 win–loss record with a 1.30 earned run average (ERA). He was not drafted out of high school in the 2015 MLB draft and enrolled at Texas Tech University.

In 2016, as a freshman at Texas Tech, Gingery appeared in 15 games (14 being starts) and was 4–2 with a 3.18 ERA. As a sophomore, in 2017, he pitched to a 10–1 record with a 1.58 ERA over 15 starts. He was named the Big 12 Conference Pitcher of the Year along with earning the National Pitcher of the Year Award. In 2018, Gingery appeared in only one game due to a torn ulnar collateral ligament of the elbow that required Tommy John surgery.

Despite missing the 2018 season, Gingery was still selected by the St. Louis Cardinals in the fourth round of the 2018 MLB draft, and he signed for $825,000. He made his professional debut in 2019 with the Gulf Coast League Cardinals, pitching 0 2/3 of an inning. He then underwent a second Tommy John surgery. Gingery did not play in a minor league game in 2020 while recovering from surgery alongside due to the cancellation of the minor league season due to the COVID-19 pandemic. He retired on April 15, 2021.
