= Josh Bard =

American baseball player and coach (born 1978)

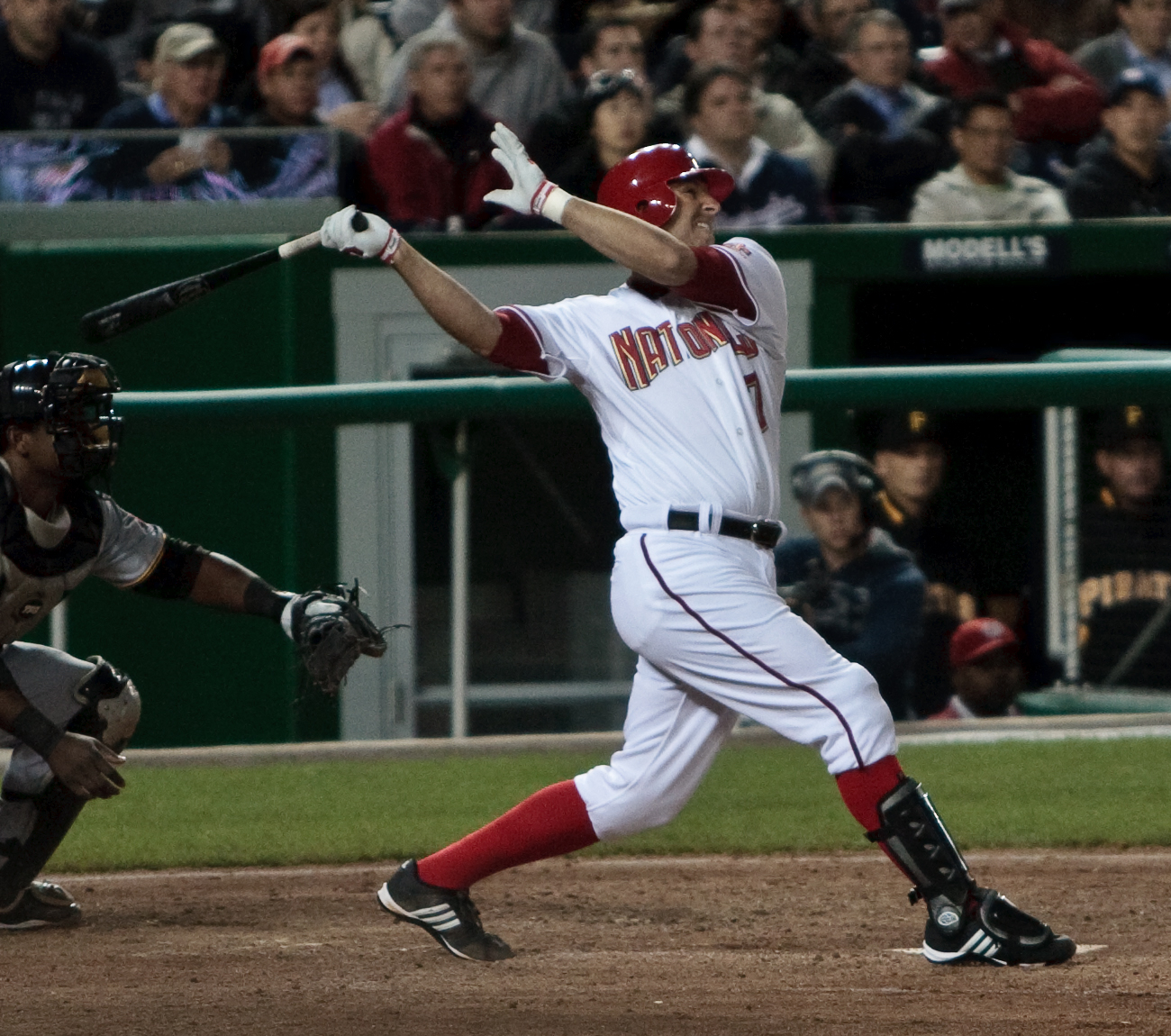
- Bard with the Washington Nationals

Los Angeles Dodgers – No. 54
- Catcher / Coach
- Born: March 30, 1978 (age 48); Ithaca, New York, U.S.
- Batted: Switch Threw: Right

MLB debut
- August 23, 2002, for the Cleveland Indians

Last MLB appearance
- September 17, 2011, for the Seattle Mariners

MLB statistics
- Batting average: .254
- Home runs: 39
- Runs batted in: 220
- Stats at Baseball Reference

Teams
- As player: Cleveland Indians (2002–2005); Boston Red Sox (2006); San Diego Padres (2006–2008); Washington Nationals (2009); Seattle Mariners (2010–2011); As coach: Los Angeles Dodgers (2016–2017); New York Yankees (2018–2019); Los Angeles Dodgers (2020–present)

Career highlights and awards
- 3× World Series champion (2020, 2024, 2025)
Medals
Men's baseball
Representing United States
Baseball World Cup
Silver medal – second place	2001 Taipei	National team
World Junior Baseball Championship
Bronze medal – third place	1996 Sancti Spíritus	Team

Joshua David Bard (born March 30, 1978) is an American former professional baseball catcher who is currently the bullpen coach for the Los Angeles Dodgers of Major League Baseball (MLB). He played in MLB as a catcher for the Cleveland Indians, Boston Red Sox, San Diego Padres, Washington Nationals, and Seattle Mariners from 2002 to 2011. Bard was a switch-hitter who threw right-handed during his playing career.

== Early life and amateur career ==
Bard was born in Ithaca, New York. He attended Cherry Creek High School in Greenwood Village, Colorado, where he won consecutive state baseball championships in 1995 and 1996, Bard was drafted by the Minnesota Twins in the 35th round of the 1996 MLB draft but chose to attend Texas Tech University instead of going pro, where he was a three-time All-American while playing for Red Raiders. He had a .366 batting average with 43 home runs and 232 runs batted in (RBI) in his three-seasons at Texas Tech. He was the Big 12 Conference Freshman of the Year in 1997 and won the Most Valuable Player Award at the 1998 Conference Tournament. Bard also played for Team USA at the 1996 World Junior Baseball Championship and in the 1997 Intercontinental Cup.

== Professional career ==
=== Colorado Rockies ===
Bard was drafted by the Colorado Rockies in the 3rd round of the 1999 MLB draft out of Texas Tech and signed with them on August 12 for a $387,500 signing bonus. He was invited to Major League spring training with the Rockies in 2000 and was assigned to the Salem Avalanche of the Carolina League to begin his professional career. He played in 93 games for them, with a .285 average. He was promoted to the Triple-A Colorado Springs Sky Sox on August 29 where he had four hits in 17 at-bats to close out the minor league season.

In 2001, Bard was again invited to the major league spring training before beginning the season with the Double-A Carolina Mudcats of the Southern League. In 35 games, he hit .258.

=== Cleveland Indians ===
On June 2, 2001, Bard (and Jody Gerut) were traded to the Cleveland Indians in exchange for Jacob Cruz. The Indians assigned him to the Double-A Akron Aeros of the Eastern League, where he hit .278 in 51 games. Following the season, he again played for Team USA, winning the Silver Medal in the 2001 Baseball World Cup.

In 2002, Bard began the season in Triple-A with the Buffalo Bisons, where he played in 94 games with a .297 average, six home runs and 53 RBI. On August 23, 2002, Bard was called up to the Indians for the first time when Einar Díaz suffered a season ending injury and he made his MLB debut against the Seattle Mariners. He recorded his first MLB hit on a single off Joel Piñeiro in the fifth inning and hit a two-run walk-off home run off James Baldwin in the bottom of the ninth becoming the second player to hit a walk-off home run in his debut (the other being Billy Parker in 1971). On the season, he batted .222 with three home runs and 12 RBI in 24 games, with a toe injury suffered in September limiting him at the end of the season.

In 2003, Bard was the Indians opening day catcher and posted a .244 average with eight home runs and 36 RBI in 91 games played. He also played in 35 games for Buffalo, after he was demoted to make room for top prospect Victor Martínez. In 2004, Bard spent the first half of the season on the disabled list due to an abdominal injury, and then spent nearly the rest of the season in the minors. He played in 50 games between Buffalo and Akron, hitting .247 while getting only 19 at-bats in seven games for the Indians. In 2005, Bard returned to the Indians roster, and spent the entire season as the back-up catcher to Martínez He batted .193 in 34 games.

=== Boston Red Sox ===
In January 2006, Bard was acquired by the Boston Red Sox, along with outfielder Coco Crisp and reliever David Riske, for reliever Guillermo Mota, third base prospect Andy Marte, and catcher Kelly Shoppach. He became the Red Sox's backup catcher during spring training 2006 following the retirement of John Flaherty. His primary duties were catching knuckleball pitcher Tim Wakefield. He struggled at the task, giving up three passed balls in his first appearance for the Red Sox on April 4. In an April 26, 2006, game against the Indians, Bard gave up four passed balls in one game, giving him a total of 10 passed balls in his first five games. As a batter, he had five hits in 18 at-bats over seven games.

=== San Diego Padres ===
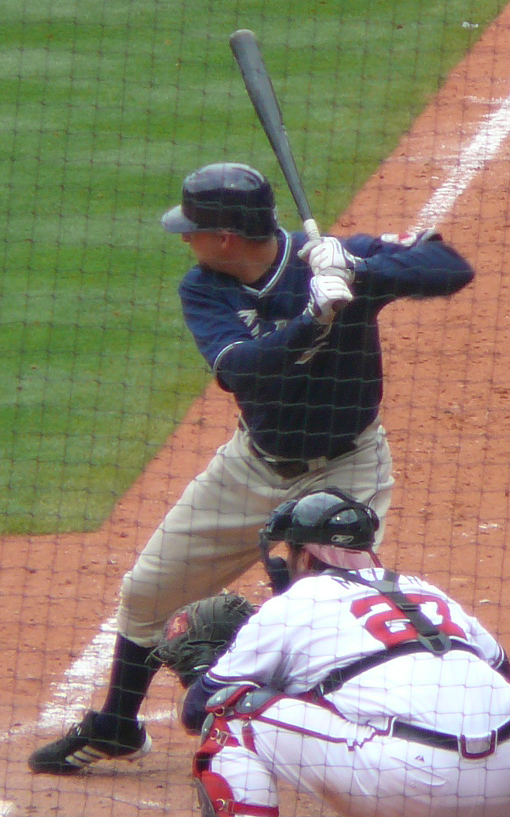
Bard with the Padres

On May 1, 2006, Bard was traded along with Cla Meredith to the San Diego Padres for Doug Mirabelli. Mirabelli, who had been traded by the Red Sox to the Padres for Mark Loretta during the offseason, was experienced at catching Wakefield.

A lifetime .240 hitter before joining the Padres, Bard hit .338 in 231 at-bats the rest of the season as the backup to Mike Piazza. He also had one hit in seven at-bats for the Padres against the St. Louis Cardinals in the National League Division Series. In 2007, he played in a career high 118 games as he became the Padres starting catcher after the departure of Piazza, batting .285 with five home runs and 51 RBI.

Bard remained the starting catcher heading into 2008, with Rob Bowen as his backup. However, he was on the disabled list from May 22 through July 24 with an ankle sprain during which Bowen was traded to the Chicago Cubs for Michael Barrett, who then suffered a season ending injury. Prospect Nick Hundley was called up on July 3 and became the Padres primary catcher as Bard also missed most of August with a strained right triceps and finished the season batting .202 in 57 games.

In October 2008, Bard left the Padres and became a free agent.

=== Washington Nationals ===
On January 2, 2009, Bard returned to the Red Sox with a one-year, $1.6 million contract, which included a $3 million club option for 2010. However, on March 18, he was released and two days later signed a minor league deal with the Washington Nationals. He spent most of the season platooning at catcher with Wil Nieves following an injury to Jesús Flores and played in 90 games, hitting .230.

=== Seattle Mariners ===
On December 28, 2009, Bard signed a minor league contract with the Mariners. He split the 2010 season between the Triple-A Tacoma Rainiers and the Mariners, batting .234 in 24 games in the minors and .214 in 39 games in the majors. On August 14 against Cleveland, he became the first Mariners player to have four hits and a grand slam in the same game.

Bard became a free agent after the season and sign a new minor league contract on January 4, 2011. He had his contract purchased by Seattle on June 29, and played in 26 games with the Mariners, hitting .210. He elected free agency on October 30.

=== Los Angeles Dodgers ===
Bard signed a minor league contract with the Los Angeles Dodgers on December 13, 2011 but was released by them prior to the start of the season on March 29, 2012. On April 5, he re-signed with the organization and was assigned to the Triple-A Albuquerque Isotopes. He served as the backup catcher to Tim Federowicz at Albuquerque and appeared in 45 games with a .331 batting average, six home runs, and 32 RBI. Bard singled in his final career at-bat against the Omaha Storm Chasers in the Isotopes season-ending playoff loss on September 9. He was released by Los Angeles on October 26.

== Coaching career ==
Bard retired after the season and chose to remain with the Dodgers as a Special Assistant. He became the Dodgers major league bullpen coach for the 2016 season.

The New York Yankees hired Bard as their bench coach for the 2018 season under new manager Aaron Boone. Bard served as acting manager on September 2, due to Boone serving a one-game suspension and again the following season on July 19. On November 11, 2019, Bard left his bench coach position.

On December 9, 2019, the Dodgers announced that Bard would return as their bullpen coach for the 2020 season.

== Personal life ==
Although Bard was born in Ithaca, New York, his family moved to Colorado when he was five months old. His wife, Lindsey, is a teacher and they have three children. His first son, Luke, played for the Houston Christian in college through his senior year and was drafted by the Dodgers in the 19th round (583rd overall) of the 2026 Major League Baseball draft.

Bard's brother Mike is an MLB personal coach, was a collegiate coach for 13 years, and is currently a private instructor in the Denver area.

Sporting positions
Preceded by Chuck Crim; Mark Prior	Los Angeles Dodgers bullpen coach 2016–2017; 2020–present	Succeeded by Mark Prior; Incumbent
Preceded by Rob Thomson	New York Yankees Bench Coach; 2018–2019	Succeeded by Carlos Mendoza
