= Baylor Bears baseball =

Baseball team representing Baylor University

Baylor Bears
- 2026 Baylor Bears baseball team
- Founded: 1902 (123 years ago)
- University: Baylor University
- Athletic director: Mack Rhoades
- Head coach: Mitch Thompson (4th season)
- Conference: Big 12
- Location: Waco, Texas
- Home stadium: Baylor Ballpark (capacity: 5,000)
- Nickname: Bears
- Colors: Green and gold

College World Series appearances
- 1977, 1978, 2005

NCAA regional champions
- 1977, 1978, 1999, 2003, 2005, 2012

NCAA tournament appearances
- 1948, 1977, 1978, 1991, 1993, 1998, 1999, 2000, 2001, 2002, 2003, 2005, 2006, 2007, 2009, 2010, 2011, 2012, 2017, 2018, 2019

Conference tournament champions
- SWC: 1977, 1978, 1993; Big 12: 2018

Conference regular season champions
- SWC: 1923, 1966; Big 12: 2000, 2005, 2012

The Baylor Bears baseball team represents Baylor University in NCAA Division I college baseball. The team belongs to the Big 12 Conference and plays home games at Baylor Ballpark. The Bears are currently led by head coach Mitch Thompson, who was hired in 2022.

== History ==
=== The early years (1902–1948) ===
Baylor first fielded a baseball team in 1902 as Baylor's second varsity sport. Pitcher Ted Lyons was a player on Baylor's Southwest Conference (SWC) Championship team in 1923. He would go on to be enshrined in Cooperstown after an outstanding career with the Chicago White Sox. Baylor did not field a baseball team from 1943 to 1945 during World War II. However, Baylor appeared in its first NCAA tournament in 1948 in only its third year of play after the war.

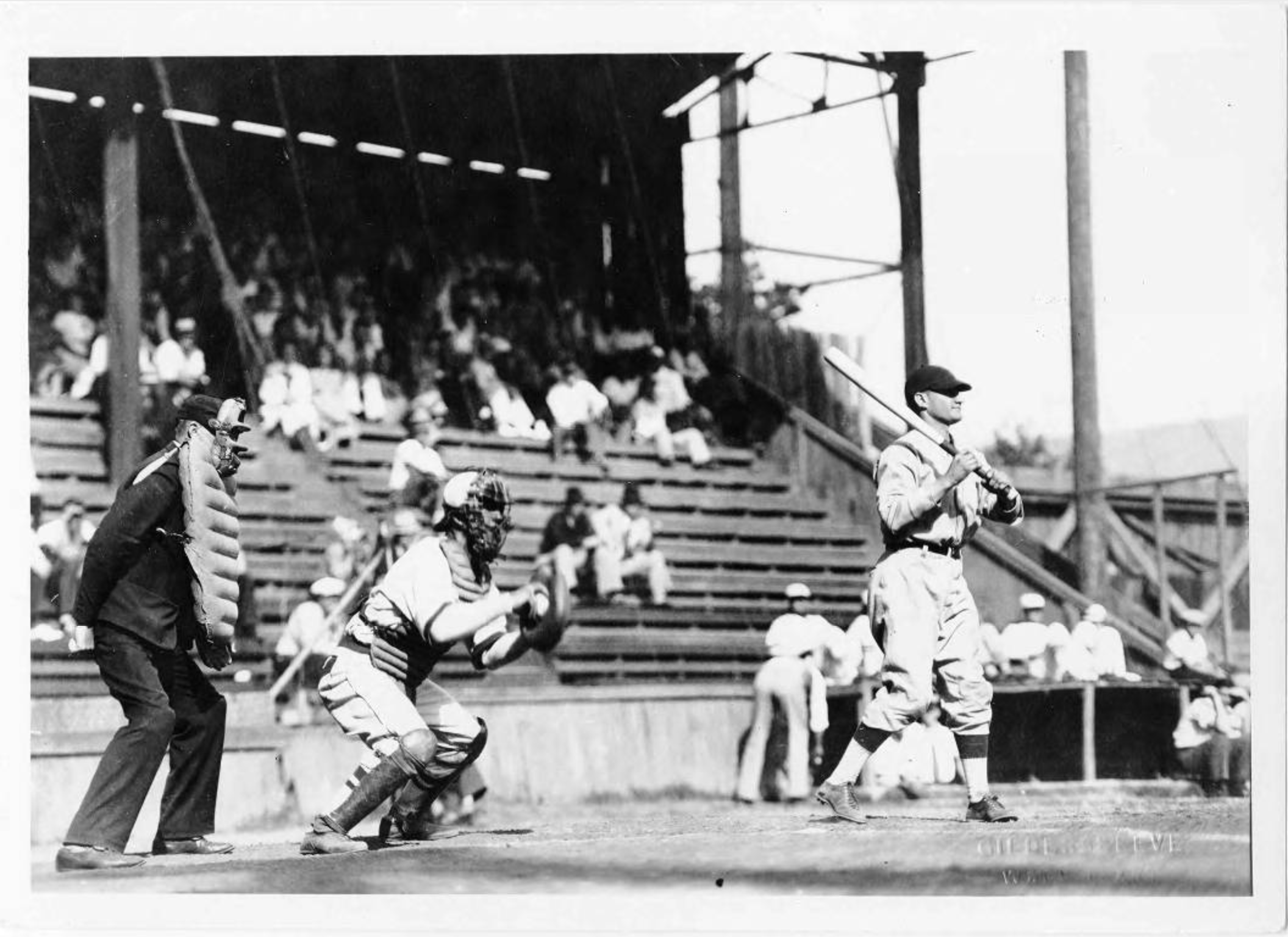
Baylor baseball game on campus

=== The modern era (1970–2012) ===
Baylor returned to the NCAA tournament in 1977, led by legendary Baylor head coach Mickey Sullivan, and advanced to the College World Series for Baylor's first appearance in Omaha. Baylor lost both of its games in the 1977 College World Series, one game each to South Carolina and Minnesota. Baylor concluded the 1977 season ranked #7 nationally by Collegiate Baseball. In 1978, the Bears returned to the College World Series but lost its only two games again, one game each to Michigan and Miami. Baylor finished the 1978 season ranked #8 nationally by Collegiate Baseball.

Baylor has achieved a season 50-win mark in only one season in its history. This season win total was earned in 1999 under the guidance of former head coach Steve Smith, ending the season with a win–loss record of 50–15. While exiting the national tournament during the Super Regional stage, the Bears ended the season ranked #8 nationally by Baseball America. It was during this 1999 season that Jason Jennings won National Player of the Year. As a pitcher and designated hitter for the Bears in 1999, Jennings also won the Golden Spikes Award, Dick Howser Trophy, Rotary Smith Award, consensus Big 12 Player of the Year and was voted a unanimous All-American. Kelly Shoppach would also earn the unanimous All-American honor as a Baylor catcher in 2001 and consensus Big 12 Player of the Year.

The 2005 Baylor Bears squad was one of the most successful teams in Baylor history. With a strong pitching staff, the squad won the Big 12 Conference and hosted both an NCAA Regional and NCAA Super Regional before advancing to the 2005 College World Series in Omaha, Nebraska. Baylor's 2005 squad would become the first to win a game in Omaha. At the College World Series, the Bears were defeated by the Texas Longhorns in the opening game. However, in back-to-back games, the Bears defeated the Oregon State Beavers and #1 Tulane Green Wave to set a rematch with the Longhorns. Despite leading 3–2 through the 8th inning, the Bears fell 4–3 which ended the season. Despite the loss in Omaha, the Bears were highly rated to end the season. Baseball America, Collegiate Baseball, and USA Today, along with several other publications, ranked the Bears #4 in the country to end the year.

In 2012, Baylor went 42–12 and was undefeated at home during conference play in the regular season. The Bears racked up a mid-season 24-game win streak (including an 18–0 start to conference play) which the players attributed to their adoption of a beaver that appeared along the banks of the Brazos River. "Feeding the Beaver" – referring to a player hitting a home-run onto the Brazos riverbank – became a year-long team slogan as the Bears earned the #4 national seed and were selected as regional hosts in the 2012 NCAA Baseball Championship tournament. In the Waco Regional, Baylor lost their first game and then won four straight games to stave off elimination and advance to host the Arkansas Razorbacks in the Super Regional. Big 12 Conference awards were won by Josh Ludy (Player of the Year) and Nathan Orf (Newcomer of the Year), Steve Smith was named Coach of the Year, and 11 Baylor players were named to All-Big 12 teams.

Baylor has reached NCAA postseason play 18 times, including 13 of the last 15 seasons (1998–2012). The Texas Longhorns are Baylor's most played opponent, including 334 matchups through the 2011 season. Baylor has defeated the TCU Horned Frogs more than any other single opponent with 136 all-time wins.

=== The Steve Rodriguez era (2015–2022) ===
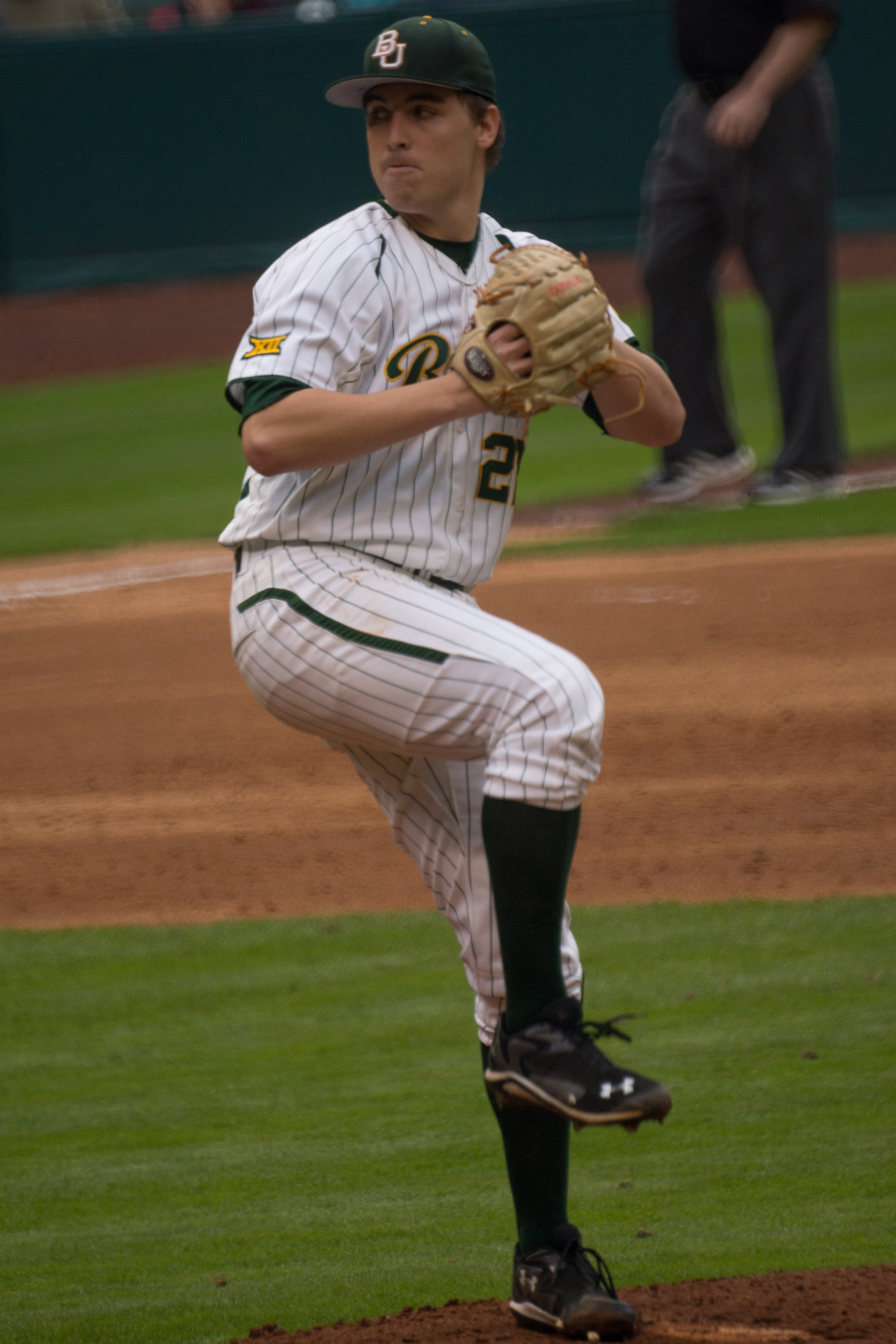
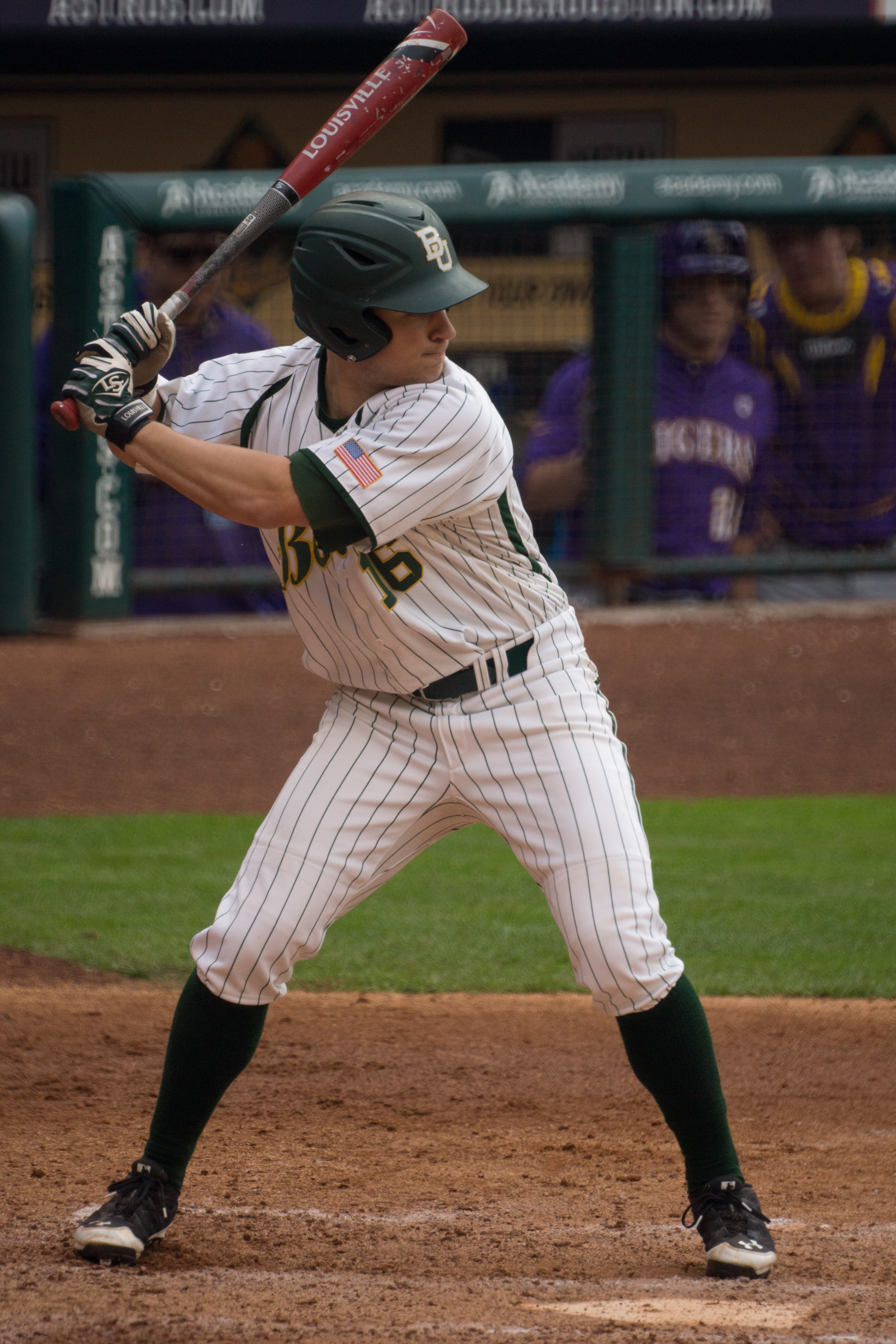
Daniel Castano (left) and Logan Brown (right) with the Bears during a game at Minute Maid Park in 2015.

In June 2015, the Bears announced the hiring of former Pepperdine head baseball coach Steve Rodriguez. Following a 24–29 record in the 2016 season, Coach Rodriguez and the Baylor baseball team ended the 2017 season with a record of 34–23, good for fourth overall in the Big 12 and an NCAA postseason appearance.

With two picks in the 2017 Major League Baseball draft (pick 719, Montana Parsons, and pick 793, Kameron Esthay) Baylor had at least one player chosen in 40 of the prior 42 drafts, dating back to 1976.

=== Memorable games ===
Among other games in recent history, Baylor has been involved in three particularly memorable games.

"The Comeback" game occurred on May 26, 2001, against the Rice Owls in Houston. Trailing 9–0 in the top of the 8th inning, Baylor scored 11 runs in the final 2 innings to win the game 11–10. Leading 11–9, Baylor pitching only allowed 1 run on 3 hits in the bottom of the ninth to secure the win. Former Bears and major leaguers David Murphy and Kelly Shoppach both played in this game for Baylor.

"The Marathon" game was played on February 21, 1999, in Houston against the Houston Cougars. This game is notable simply for its duration. Lasting 6 hours and 43 minutes, Baylor was finally victorious 8–2 after 22 innings of play. The game saw 87 plate appearances by Baylor. The game included a total of 28 different batters collecting 25 total hits, 13 different pitchers and 2 ejected coaches.

The "Miracle on 13th Street" game was played in Omaha, Nebraska at Rosenblatt Stadium on June 21, 2005, against #1 Tulane Green Wave. Trailing Tulane 7–0 in the bottom of the 7th inning, the Bears scored 8 runs in the final 3 innings to beat the Green Wave 8–7 in the nationally televised game on ESPN. The comeback was completed with a ninth-inning game-winning play that occurred with the bases loaded, 1-out, and Baylor down 7–6. The ball was hit up the middle and fielded by the 2nd baseman who fired to first to try to complete the double play. Not only was the throw late, allowing the tying run to score, but it was wild, allowing the winning run to score from second base.

== Stadium ==
Baylor Ballpark is the home of Baylor baseball. The park hosted its first game on February 5, 1999, a 3–2 Baylor win over the Long Beach State Dirtbags. A replacement for outdated Ferrell Field (Baylor's on campus home park from 1977 to 1998), Baylor Ballpark was one of the finest collegiate stadiums in the country at the time of its construction during 1998. With a listed capacity of 5,000 people, the retro-styled ballpark was modeled after Plainsman Park, home field of the Auburn Tigers, which had a very similar design, but was smaller. In 2001, Sports Illustrated on Campus ranked Baylor Ballpark "the best college baseball venue". And the ballpark was voted as the third best collegiate baseball stadium in a 2003 poll conducted by Baseball America. Baylor formerly played its home games at stadiums including Carroll Field (on campus), Katy Park (a Waco city field), Dutton Street Park (a Waco city field) and the aforementioned Ferrell Field. Baylor played its home games exclusively at Dutton Street Park from 1960 to 1976.

The first season for Baylor Ballpark was 1999, although construction continued throughout the season. Despite the construction, Baylor Ballpark hosted its first NCAA Regional that season. It hosted additional NCAA Regionals in 2000 and 2005 along with two NCAA Super Regionals (2000, 2005). The largest single-game attendance at Baylor Ballpark occurred on April 17, 2004, versus the Texas Longhorns, a recorded attendance of 5,602 crowded the confines to see the Longhorns overcome the Bears 7–6.

Baylor Ballpark has been recognized as a top-tier facility for collegiate baseball. In 2003, Baseball America conducted a survey in which college coaches voted Baylor's facility the third best ballpark in the country.

== Conference championships ==
Baylor has won or shared 5 Conference Championships. 1923 (SWC), 1966 (SWC), 2000 (Big 12), 2005 (Big 12), 2012 (Big 12)

Baylor has won 4 Conference Tournament championships. 1977(SWC),1978(SWC),1993(SWC),2018(Big 12). Baylor has appeared in 6 Big 12 Conference Tournament championship title games.

== Head coaches ==
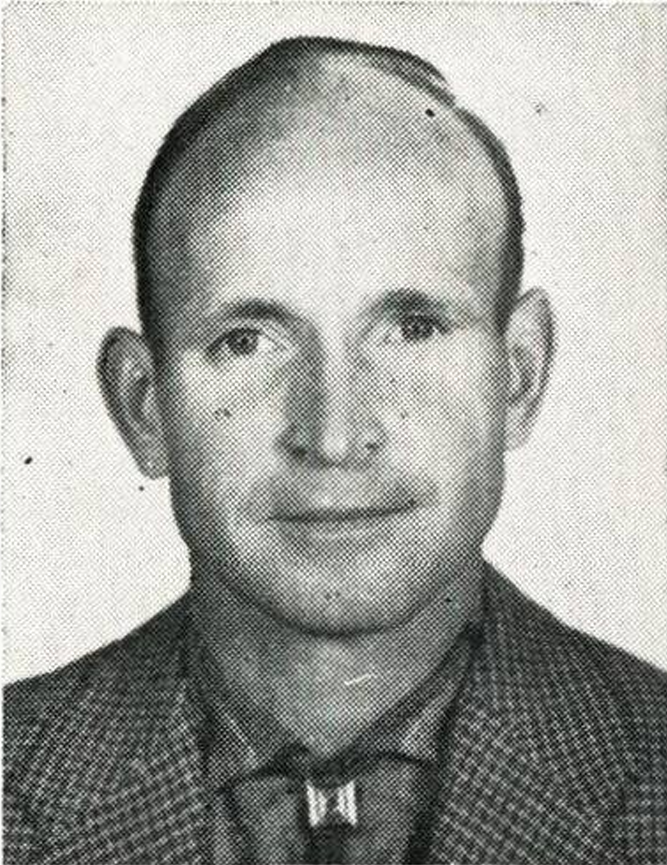
Head coach E. E. "Dutch" Schroeder, c. 1964

Coach	Years	Record	CWS appearances	NCAA Appearances	Conf Championships
J.C. Ewing	1902	5–9	0	0	0
R.N. Watts	1903–1904	14–18	0	0	0
Lee Carroll	1905	12–7	0	0	0
Luther Burleson	1906–1908	25–34	0	0	0
E.J. Mills	1909	9–12	0	0	0
Ralph Glaze	1910–1913	54–27	0	0	0
C.P. Mosley	1914–1919	47–60	0	0	0
Frank Bridges	1920–1927	95–73	0	0	1
Morley Jennings	1928–1939	120–78–1	0	0	0
Lloyd Russell	1940–1941	22–17	0	0	0
Floyd Crow	1942	8–8	0	0	0
A.E. Jones	1946–1950	82–47	0	1	0
Vic Bradford	1951	10–10	0	0	0
Chuck Devereaux	1952	9–6	0	0	0
A.E. Jones	1953	7–5	0	0	0
Boyd SoRelle	1954–1957	48–45	0	0	0
Lloyd Russell	1958–1961	50–41–1	0	0	0
Dutch Schroeder	1962–1973	196–165	0	0	1
Mickey Sullivan	1974–1994	649–428–4	2	4	0
Steve Smith	1995–2015	744–523–1	1	13	3
Steve Rodriguez	2016–2022	197–134	0	3	0
Mitch Thompson	2023–present	1–2	0	0	0

== Season-by-season results ==
Record table
Season	Coach	Overall	Conference	Standing	Postseason
Independent (1902–1914)
1902	J. C. Ewing	5–9			
1903	R. N. Watts	6–8			
1904	R. N. Watts	7–10			
1905	Lee Carroll	12–7			
1906	Luther Burleson	7–9			
1907	Luther Burleson	8–14			
1908	Luther Burleson	10–11			
1909	Enoch J. Mills	9–12			
1910	Ralph Glaze	8–11			
1911	Ralph Glaze	17–7			
1912	Ralph Glaze	16–0			
1913	Ralph Glaze	13–9			
1914	Charles Mosley	10–10			
Southwest Conference (1915–1996)
1915	Charles Mosley	10–10	5–7	4th	
1916	Charles Mosley	13–7	6–4	2nd	
1917	Charles Mosley	3–7	1–2	4th	
1918	Charles Mosley	2–15	1–6	3rd	
1919	Charles Mosley	9–11	3–5	3rd	
1920	Frank Bridges	13–7	8–5	3rd	
1921	Frank Bridges	3–11	3–9	5th	
1922	Frank Bridges	13–7	11–5	2nd	
1923	Frank Bridges	15–6	14–5	1st	
1924	Frank Bridges	16–9	11–8	4th	
1925	Frank Bridges	13–10	9–5	3rd	
1926	Frank Bridges	12–9	6–5	4th	
1927	Frank Bridges	10–4	5–11	5th	
1928	Morley Jennings	16–4	11–4	2nd	
1929	Morley Jennings	14–6	12–4	2nd	
1930	Morley Jennings	11–6	10–6	3rd	
1931	Morley Jennings	10–3	7–3	3rd	
1932	Morley Jennings	10–7	7–7	4th	
1933	Morley Jennings	5–9	3–7	4th	
1934	Morley Jennings	2–12	2–10	4th	
1935	Morley Jennings	7–8	5–7	4th	
1936	Morley Jennings	9–6–1	7–6–1	4th	
1937	Morley Jennings	12–6	9–6	3rd	
1938	Morley Jennings	13–4–2	9–4	4th	
1939	Morley Jennings	11–7	8–7	T–2nd	
1940	Lloyd Russell	11–9	7–7	3rd	
1941	Lloyd Russell	11–8	8–6	3rd	
1942	Floyd Crow	8–8	7–8	T–3rd	
No Team Fielded: World War II (1943–1945)
1946	A. E. Jones	12–9	9–6	2nd	
1947	A. E. Jones	12–8	9–5	3rd	
1948	A. E. Jones	18–11	9–5	3rd	NCAA Western Regional, L 2–2
1949	A. E. Jones	20–9	9–6	3rd	
1950	A. E. Jones	20–10	8–7	3rd	
1951	Vic Bradford	10–10	6–9	T–4th	
1952	Chuck Devereaux		9–6	2nd	
1953	A. E. Jones		7–5	3rd	
1954	Boyd SoRelle	15–9–1	9–5–1	2nd	
1955	Boyd SoRelle	11–14	7–8	T–3rd	
1956	Boyd SoRelle	12–11	8–6	T–2nd	
1957	Boyd SoRelle	10–11	4–7	4th	
1959	Lloyd Russell	5–17	2–11	6th	
1960	Lloyd Russell	15–7	10–5	T–2nd	
1961	Lloyd Russell	18–4–1	10–4–1	T–2nd	
1962	Dutch Schroeder	17–7	9–5	3rd	
1963	Dutch Schroeder	13–11	7–8	4th	
1964	Dutch Schroeder	18–7	10–5	2nd	
1965	Dutch Schroeder	18–7	9–6	3rd	
1966	Dutch Schroeder	18–10–1	8–6–1	T–1st	
1967	Dutch Schroeder	14–13	4–11	6th	
1968	Dutch Schroeder	14–13	9–7	4th	
1969	Dutch Schroeder	10–17	6–11	6th	
1970	Dutch Schroeder	16–21	4–14	6th	
1971	Dutch Schroeder	17–22	7–10	5th	
1972	Dutch Schroeder	20–20	6–12	T–5th	
1973	Dutch Schroeder	21–17	9–9	4th	
1974	Mickey Sullivan	25–19	12–12	5th	
1975	Mickey Sullivan	25–19	11–13	T–4th	
1976	Mickey Sullivan	23–19	14–10	4th	
1977	Mickey Sullivan	43–15	15–9	3rd	SWC Tournament, W 3–0; NCAA South Central Regional, W 4–1; NCAA College World Series, L 0–2
1978	Mickey Sullivan	32–19	15–9	3rd	SWC Tournament, W 3–0; NCAA South Central Regional, W 3–0; NCAA College World Series, L 0–2
1979	Mickey Sullivan	34–15	13–9	3rd	SWC Tournament, L 0–2
1980	Mickey Sullivan	25–19–2	12–12	5th	
1981	Mickey Sullivan	21–24	6–15	8th	
1982	Mickey Sullivan	25–22	9–12	6th	
1983	Mickey Sullivan	26–22	11–10	T–4th	
1984	Mickey Sullivan	26–23	9–12	T–5th	
1985	Mickey Sullivan	42–13	14–7	2nd	SWC Tournament, L 0–2
1986	Mickey Sullivan	40–22	12–9	4th	SWC Tournament, L 1–2
1987	Mickey Sullivan	38–15	9–12	5th	
1988	Mickey Sullivan	25–31–1	9–12	4th	SWC Tournament, L 1–2
1989	Mickey Sullivan	32–19	7–14	T–6th	
1990	Mickey Sullivan	33–19	9–12	6th	
1991	Mickey Sullivan	40–20	12–9	3rd	SWC Tournament, L 0–2; NCAA Midwest Regional, L 0–2
1992	Mickey Sullivan	29–26	17–19	3rd	
1993	Mickey Sullivan	41–19	11–7	T–2nd	SWC Tournament, W 3–0; NCAA South Regional, L 1–2
1994	Mickey Sullivan	24–28–1	6–12	T–5th	
1995	Steve Smith	25–28	7–17	6th	
1996	Steve Smith	32–27	11–13	T–4th	SWC Tournament, L 1–2
Big 12 Conference (1997–present)
1997	Steve Smith	32–23	12–18	5th	Big 12 tournament, L 0–2
1998	Steve Smith	41–20–1	18–10	2nd	Big 12 tournament, L 1–2; NCAA South I Regional, L 1–2
1999	Steve Smith	50–15	20–7	2nd	Big 12 tournament, L 3–1; NCAA Waco Regional, W 3–0; NCAA Waco Super Regional, L 1–2
2000	Steve Smith	45–17	23–7	1st	Big 12 tournament, L 2–2; NCAA Waco Regional, L 0–2
2001	Steve Smith	37–24	17–10	4th	Big 12 tournament, L 0–2; NCAA Houston Regional, L 2–2
2002	Steve Smith	36–26	13–13	5th	Big 12 tournament, L 0–2; NCAA Austin Regional, L 2–2
2003	Steve Smith	45–23	15–12	5th	Big 12 tournament, L 4–2; NCAA Hattiesburg Regional, W 3–0; NCAA Baton Rouge Super Regional, L 1–2
2004	Steve Smith	29–31	13–12	6th	Big 12 tournament, L 2–2
2005	Steve Smith	46–24	19–8	1st	Big 12 tournament, L 3–1; NCAA Waco Regional, W 3–0; NCAA Waco Super Regional, W 2–1; NCAA College World Series, L 2–2
2006	Steve Smith	37–26	13–14	5th	Big 12 tournament, L 1–2; NCAA Houston Regional, L 2–2
2007	Steve Smith	35–27	12–15	6th	Big 12 tournament, L 3–1; NCAA Houston Regional, L 1–2
2008	Steve Smith	32–26	11–16	6th	Big 12 tournament, L 1–2
2009	Steve Smith	30–26	10–16	8th	Big 12 tournament, L 2–1; NCAA Baton Rouge Regional, L 1–2
2010	Steve Smith	36–24	12–13	6th	Big 12 tournament, L 3–1; NCAA Fort Worth Regional, L 2–2
2011	Steve Smith	31–28	13–14	5th	Big 12 tournament, L 0–2; NCAA Houston Regional, L 2–2
2012	Steve Smith	49–17	20–4	1st	Big 12 tournament, L 2–2; NCAA Waco Regional, W 4–1; NCAA Waco Super Regional, L 1–2
2013	Steve Smith	27–28	12–11	5th	Big 12 tournament, L 0–3
2014	Steve Smith	26–31	8–15	7th	Big 12 tournament, L 2–2
2015	Steve Smith	23–32	9–15	8th	Big 12 tournament, L 2–2
2016	Steve Rodriguez	24–26	10–13	6th	Big 12 tournament, L 0-2
2017	Steve Rodriguez	34–23	12–12	4th	Big 12 tournament, L 0-2 NCAA Houston Regional, L 0-2
2018	Steve Rodriguez	37-21	13-11	5th	Big 12 tournament, W 4-0 NCAA Palo Alto Regional, L 1-2
2019	Steve Rodriguez	35-19	14-8	2nd	Big 12 tournament, L 1-2 NCAA Los Angeles Regional, L 1-2
Pre-Conference (1902 - 1915):		128-117-0			
SWC Overall (1915 - 1996):		1362-994-10	650-634-4		
Big 12 Overall (1997 - Present):		813-555-1	319-274-0		
Overall Combined Record:		2303-1666-11	969-908-4		

== Major League Baseball ==
Baylor has had 79 Major League Baseball draft selections since the draft began in 1965.

Bears in the Major League Baseball Draft

Year	Player	Round	Team
1965	Fred Rath	4	White Sox
1968	John Bevil	26	Tigers
1971	Phillip Beall	21	Giants
1976	Steve Macko	28	Giants
1977	Steve Macko	5	Cubs
1978	Burl Coker	26	Giants
1978	Andy Beene	14	Yankees
1978	Jon Perlman	5	Cubs
1979	Michael Roberts	8	Rangers
1979	Andy Beene	5	Brewers
1979	Jon Perlman	1	Cubs
1980	Fritzie Connally	7	Cubs
1981	Lee Tunnell	2	Pirates
1982	Stan Hilton	13	Blue Jays
1982	Jerry Arnold	12	Phillies
1983	James Trevathan	21	White Sox
1983	Steve Smith	5	Giants
1983	Alan McKay	5	Blue Jays
1983	Stan Hilton	1	Athletics
1984	Belgee Falkner	39	Pirates
1984	Ronald King	32	Rangers
1984	John Christy	30	White Sox
1985	Blaine Beatty	2	Cardinals
1985	Greg Dennis	37	Blue Jays
1985	Kyle Todd	14	Pirates
1985	Ken Patterson	3	Yankees
1986	Todd Hawkins	39	Mets
1986	Blaine Beatty	9	Orioles
1987	Todd Hawkins	46	Giants
1987	Braz Davis	21	Cubs
1988	Pat Combs	1	Phillies
1989	Trent Weaver	29	Athletics
1991	Glenn Nevill	31	Phillies
1991	Scott Ruffcorn	1	White Sox
1992	David Elsbernd	17	White Sox
1992	Brian Carpenter	8	Cardinals
1993	Jason Marshall	72	Indians
1993	Brent Bearden	44	Padres
1993	Mike Bohny	41	Orioles
1993	Joe Wharton	18	Yankees
1993	Jason Rathbun	11	Yankees
1993	Dean Crow	10	Mariners
1994	Brent Bearden	24	Blue Jays
1995	Tim Peters	26	Twins
1996	Scott Morrison	25	Dodgers
1996	Marty Crawford	23	Phillies
1996	Kris Lambert	11	Reds
1997	Kris Lambert	13	Pirates
1998	Jon Topolski	31	Marlins
1998	Charley Carter	15	Astros
1998	Jeremy Dodson	7	Royals
1998	Kip Wells	1	White Sox
1999	Jaime Bubela	31	Red Sox
1999	Bryan Loeb	29	Mets
1999	Mark Outlaw	15	Phillies
1999	Eric Nelson	8	Royals
1999	Jon Topolski	4	Astros
1999	Jason Jennings	1	Rockies
2000	Preston Underdown	31	Phillies
2000	Anthony Hensley	20	Phillies
2000	Jaime Bubela	7	Mariners
2000	Kyle Evans	6	Indians
2000	Jace Brewer	5	Devil Rays
2000	Chad Hawkins	1	Rangers
2001	Mike Huggins	25	Rockies
2001	Josh Scott	25	Phillies
2001	Matt Williams	15	Cardinals
2001	Trevor Mote	15	Astros
2001	Kelly Shoppach	2	Red Sox
2002	Jared Theodorakos	49	Rockies
2002	Justin Taylor	38	Royals
2002	Paul Thorp	31	Yankees
2002	Paul Richmond	28	Blue Jays
2002	Steven White	18	Brewers
2002	Mike Huggins	13	Orioles
2002	Kyle Edens	3	Reds
2003	Stephen Pritchard	35	Phillies
2003	Jared Theodorakos	25	Brewers
2003	Mark Saccomanno	23	Astros
2003	Zane Carlson	16	Padres
2003	Chris Durbin	10	Red Sox
2003	Trey Webb	5	Expos
2003	Steven White	4	Yankees
2003	David Murphy	1	Red Sox
2004	Zane Carlson	27	Royals
2004	David Taylor	20	Cubs
2004	Drew Sutton	15	Astros
2005	Abe Woody	31	Reds
2005	Sean Walker	24	Astros
2005	Paul Witt	15	Marlins
2005	Michael Griffin	14	Reds
2005	Josh Ford	9	Diamondbacks
2005	David Taylor	7	Cubs
2005	Tyler Bullock	6	Braves
2005	Kyle Reynolds	6	Cubs
2005	Mark McCormick	1	Cardinals
2006	Ryan LaMotta	37	Tigers
2006	Kevin Russo	20	Yankees
2006	Zachary Dillon	20	Orioles
2006	Seth Fortenberry	11	Yankees
2006	Cory VanAllen	5	Nationals
2007	Jeff Mandel	19	Nationals
2008	Nicholas Cassavechia	37	Tigers
2008	Randall Linebaugh	37	Reds
2008	Timothy Matthews	27	Rockies
2008	Mace Thurman	19	Reds
2008	Beamer Weems	8	Padres
2009	Raynor Campbell	31	Indians
2009	Adam Hornung	19	Angels
2009	Kendal Volz	9	Red Sox
2009	Craig Fritsch	8	Tigers
2009	Dustin Dickerson	6	Marlins
2009	Shaver Hansen	6	Mariners
2009	Aaron Miller	1	Dodgers
2010	Shawn Tolleson	30	Dodgers
2010	Willie Kempf	27	Braves
2010	Gregg Glime	24	Marlins
2010	Brooks Pinckard	18	Cubs
2010	Craig Fritsch	16	Phillies
2010	Raynor Campbell	14	Giants
2011	Landis Ware	44	Angels
2011	Brooks Pinckard	10	Reds
2011	Logan Verrett	3	Mets
2012	Trent Blank	30	Rockies
2012	Tyler Bremer	27	Cubs
2012	Joshua Turley	16	Tigers
2012	Logan Vick	11	Indians
2012	Josh Ludy	8	Phillies
2012	Max Muncy	5	Athletics
2013	Crayton Bare	28	Dodgers
2013	Jake Miller	27	Diamondbacks
2013	Max Garner	18	Marlins
2013	Cal Towey	17	Angels
2013	Dillon Newman	16	Astros
2014	Brett Doe	38	Twins
2014	Josh Michalec	21	Rockies
2016	Daniel Castano	19	Cardinals
2017	Kameron Esthay	26	Nationals
2017	Montana Parsons	24	Marlins
2018	Troy Montemayor	25	Cardinals
2019	Luke Boyd	38	Angels
2019	Josh Bissonette	31	Pirates
2019	Kyle Hill	10	Mariners
2019	Cody Bradford	6	Rangers
2019	Davis Wendzel	1	Rangers
2019	Shea Langeliers	1	Braves
2020	Nick Loftin	1	Royals
2021	Luke Boyd	17	Padres
2021	Andy Thomas	5	Mariners

== See also ==
- List of NCAA Division I baseball programs
