= Texas Tech Red Raiders baseball =

Intercollegiate baseball team of Texas Tech University

Texas Tech Red Raiders
- 2026 Texas Tech Red Raiders baseball team
- Founded: 1926 (99 years ago)
- University: Texas Tech University
- Head coach: Tim Tadlock (14th season)
- Conference: Big 12
- Location: Lubbock, Texas
- Home stadium: Dan Law Field at Rip Griffin Park (capacity: 4,801)
- Nickname: Red Raiders
- Colors: Scarlet and black

College World Series appearances
- 2014, 2016, 2018, 2019

NCAA regional champions
- 2014, 2016, 2018, 2019, 2021

NCAA tournament appearances
- 1995, 1996, 1997, 1998, 1999, 2000, 2001, 2002, 2003, 2004, 2014, 2016, 2017, 2018, 2019, 2021, 2022, 2023

Conference tournament champions
- 1995, 1998

Conference regular season champions
- 1995, 1997, 2016, 2017, 2019

The Texas Tech Red Raiders baseball team represents Texas Tech University in NCAA Division I college baseball. The team competes in the Big 12 Conference and plays at Dan Law Field at Rip Griffin Park. Their head coach is Tim Tadlock and is entertaining his 9th season with the Red Raiders.

== History ==
=== Early years ===
The inaugural 1926 Texas Tech baseball team.

Along with the football and men's basketball teams, the Texas Tech baseball team was founded during the university's initial academic year, in 1925–26. The team's first series was against the West Texas A&M Buffaloes in 1926, an 18–9 victory in the first game and 14–9 loss in the second. The third game in the team's history—this one against Daniel Baker College—ended in a 3–3 tie after 11 innings.

E. Y. Freeland was the first coach of the Red Raiders, though the team was known as the Matadors at the time. He remained in the position for three years before R. Grady Higginbotham took the role. Higginbotham coached for only two years. From 1930 to 1953, Texas Tech did not field an intercollegiate baseball team.

=== Revival era ===
When the program returned in 1954, Beattie Feathers became the head coach of the Red Raiders and remained until 1960. He was followed by Berl Huffman (1961–1967), Kal Segrist (1968–1983), and Gary Ashby (1984–1986). Texas Tech joined the Southwest Conference in 1968, but experienced little success. During this 26 season period, the Red Raiders had only seven winning seasons; only twice finishing as high as third, with only three winning records in conference play.

=== Modern era ===
Larry Hays took over the Red Raiders baseball team in 1987. Under Hays, Texas Tech endured only two losing seasons, his first and last, and enjoyed their greatest success in baseball. Hays took Texas Tech from having a losing tradition to being a national contender. When Hays started with the Red Raiders, the team's overall record stood at 550–576–5. By the time he left, he was the fourth-winningest coach in college baseball history and improved the team's record to 1,365–1,054–8. The Red Raiders reached eight straight NCAA tournaments from 1995 to 2002 and again in 2004, three of which were held at Dan Law Field at Rip Griffin Park. They also won the 1995 Southwest Conference championship, and the inaugural Big 12 Conference championship in 1997. The Hays-led Red Raiders also won the SWC Tournament in 1995, and the Big 12 Tournament in 1998.

On June 2, 2008, Larry Hays announced his retirement, paving the way for assistant coach Dan Spencer to take over. Spencer, a former Texas Tech player, won back-to-back national championships as an assistant head coach for the Oregon State Beavers. In Spencer's four seasons as head coach, he led the Red Raiders to only one winning season. Prior to Spencer's fourth, and final, season as head coach, Tim Tadlock was hired as associate head coach for the Red Raiders under Dan Spencer. The following season saw Tadlock replace Spencer as the ninth head coach of the Red Raiders following Spencer's firing.

Tadlock was a starting shortstop for the Red Raiders during the 1990 and 1991 seasons. Tadlock previously led the Grayson College Vikings to back-to-back NJCAA Division I World Series championships in the team's five appearances over his 9 seasons as head coach. Tadlock's first season saw the team finish 26–30, and 8th of 9 in Big 12 play. Prior to the 2014 season, the Red Raiders were selected to finish in 8th place in the Big 12 Conference in the preseason polls. In only his second season, the Red Raiders won their first NCAA tournament Regional Championship, defeating the Columbia Lions and host team Miami Hurricanes to advance to the program's first Super Regional appearance. The team would host College of Charleston in the Lubbock Super Regional before shutting them out twice in two 1–0 games, earning the programs first berth in the College World Series on the back of a 0.65 post season earned run average produced by assistant coach Ray Hayward's pitching staff. The Red Raiders have since gone on to win Big 12 regular season conference championships in 2016, 2017 and 2019 and again host both Regional and Super Regional rounds of the NCAA tournament in Lubbock while also making three more appearances in the College World Series (2016, 2018–2019).

== Season-by-season results ==
Record table
Season	Coach	Overall	Conference	Standing	Postseason
Independent (1926–1967)
1926	Ewing Y. Freeland	11–2–1			
1927	Ewing Y. Freeland	4–9–1			
1928	Grady Higginbotham	8–6			
1929	Grady Higginbotham	2–11			
No Team Fielded (1930–1953)
1954	Beattie Feathers	1–7–1			
1955	Beattie Feathers	3–17			
1956	Beattie Feathers	8–7			
1957	Beattie Feathers	7–4			
1958	Beattie Feathers	6–9			
1959	Beattie Feathers	7–6			
1960	Beattie Feathers	8–7			
1961	Berl Huffman	13–5			
1962	Berl Huffman	15–11			
1963	Berl Huffman	12–10			
1964	Berl Huffman	9–16			
1965	Berl Huffman	7–16			
1966	Berl Huffman	10–13			
1967	Berl Huffman	14–16			
Southwest Conference (1968–1996)
1968	Kal Segrist	9–20	2–15	7th	
1969	Kal Segrist	13–13	9–6	3rd	
1970	Kal Segrist	12–16–1	5–10	5th	
1971	Kal Segrist	26–14	11–7	3rd	
1972	Kal Segrist	23–19	6–12	T–5th	
1973	Kal Segrist	12–16	6–10	T–6th	
1974	Kal Segrist	11–21	9–15	T–8th	
1975	Kal Segrist	22–23	9–15	6th	
1976	Kal Segrist	32–21	10–11	6th	
1977	Kal Segrist	25–24	12–12	5th	
1978	Kal Segrist	23–25	8–16	7th	
1979	Kal Segrist	16–23	9–15	6th	
1980	Kal Segrist	28–23–1	14–10	4th	SWC Tournament, L 1–2
1981	Kal Segrist	26–21	8–13	7th	
1982	Kal Segrist	21–22	9–12	5th	
1983	Kal Segrist	18–23	8–13	6th	
1984	Gary Ashby	33–22	9–12	T–5th	
1985	Gary Ashby	18–33	2–19	8th	
1986	Gary Ashby	34–25	7–14	6th	
1987	Larry Hays	21–28	7–14	6th	
1988	Larry Hays	34–25–1	7–14	6th	
1989	Larry Hays	32–22	9–12	T–4th	
1990	Larry Hays	31–29	6–16	7th	
1991	Larry Hays	42–18	9–12	7th	
1992	Larry Hays	29–25	15–19	4th	
1993	Larry Hays	43–15	11–7	T–2nd	SWC Tournament, L 0–2
1994	Larry Hays	40–17	12–6	T–2nd	SWC Tournament, L 2–2
1995	Larry Hays	51–14	16–8	1st	SWC Tournament, W 3–1; NCAA Midwest I Regional, L 3–2
1996	Larry Hays	49–15	15–9	2nd	SWC Tournament, L 3–2; NCAA Central II Regional, L 2–2
Big 12 Conference (1997–present)
1997	Larry Hays	46–14	23–7	1st	Big 12 tournament, L 3–2; NCAA Central Regional, L 0–2
1998	Larry Hays	44–20	18–11	3rd	Big 12 tournament, W 4–1; NCAA Atlantic I Regional, L 1–2
1999	Larry Hays	42–17	18–8	3rd	Big 12 tournament, L 0–2; NCAA Lubbock Regional, L 2–2
2000	Larry Hays	36–26	18–12	5th	Big 12 tournament, L 1–2; NCAA Houston Regional, L 1–2
2001	Larry Hays	43–20–1	19–10–1	2nd	Big 12 tournament, L 1–2; NCAA Fullerton Regional, L 3–2
2002	Larry Hays	42–20	16–11	2nd	Big 12 tournament, L 1–2; NCAA Houston Regional, L 1–2
2003	Larry Hays	30–25	8–18	9th	
2004	Larry Hays	40–21	17–9	3rd	Big 12 tournament, L 0–2; NCAA Atlanta Regional, L 2–2
2005	Larry Hays	34–25	9–16	8th	Big 12 tournament, L 1–2
2006	Larry Hays	31–26–1	9–16–1	8th	Big 12 tournament, L 0–3
2007	Larry Hays	28–27	8–18	10th	
2008	Larry Hays	25–30	9–18	T–9th	
2009	Dan Spencer	25–32	12–15	7th	Big 12 tournament, L 1–2
2010	Dan Spencer	28–29	13–14	5th	Big 12 tournament, L 1–2
2011	Dan Spencer	33–25	12–15	7th	Big 12 tournament, L 0–2
2012	Dan Spencer	29–26	7–17	T–8th	
2013	Tim Tadlock	26–30	9–15	8th	Big 12 tournament, L 1–2
2014	Tim Tadlock	45–19	14–10	4th	Big 12 tournament, L 0–2; NCAA Coral Gables Regional, W 3–1; NCAA Lubbock Super Regional, W 2–0; NCAA College World Series, 0–2
2015	Tim Tadlock	31–24	13–11	T-3rd	Big 12 tournament, L 1–2
2016	Tim Tadlock	47–20	19–5	1st	Big 12 tournament, L 1–2; NCAA Lubbock Regional, W 3–1; NCAA Lubbock Super Regional, W 2–1; NCAA College World Series, 1–2
2017	Tim Tadlock	45–17	16–8	T-1st	Big 12 tournament, L 1–2; NCAA Lubbock Regional, L 2-2
2018	Tim Tadlock	45–20	15–9	3rd	Big 12 tournament, L 1–2; NCAA Lubbock Regional, W 3–0; NCAA Lubbock Super Regional, W 2–1; NCAA College World Series, 1–2
2019	Tim Tadlock	45–19	16–8	1st	Big 12 tournament, L 3–2; NCAA Lubbock Regional, W 3–0; NCAA Lubbock Super Regional, W 2–1; NCAA College World Series, L 2–2
2020	Tim Tadlock	16–3	0–0	—	Season cancelled due to COVID-19
2021	Tim Tadlock	39–17	14–10	3rd	Big 12 tournament, L 1–2; NCAA Lubbock Regional, W 3–0; NCAA Lubbock Super Regional, L 0–2
2022	Tim Tadlock	39–22	15–9	T–2nd	Big 12 tournament, L 1–2; NCAA Statesboro Regional, L 2–2
2023	Tim Tadlock	41-23	12-12	6th	Big 12 tournament, L 2-2; NCAA Gainesville Regional, L 2–2
Total:					
National champion Postseason invitational champion Conference regular season champion Conference regular season and conference tournament champion Division regular season champion Division regular season and conference tournament champion Conference tournament champion

== Individual accomplishments ==
Unanimous All-American

- Jace Jung (2021)
- Josh Jung (2019)
- Steven Gingery (2017)

National Pitcher of the Year Award

- Steven Gingery (2017)

Big 12 Conference Player of the Year

- Jace Jung (2021)
- Josh Jung (2019)
- Hunter Hargrove (2017)
- Eric Gutierrez (2016)
- Joe Dillon (1997)

Big 12 Conference Pitcher of the Year

- Brandon Birdsell (2022)
- Steven Gingery (2017)

Big 12 Conference Freshman of the Year

- Hudson White (2022)
- Gabe Holt (2018)
- Josh Jung (2017)

Big 12 Conference Coach of the Year

- Tim Tadlock (2016)
- Larry Hays (1997)

Big 12 Conference Tournament MVP

- Josh Bard (1998)

Southwest Conference Coach of the Year

- Larry Hays (1995)

Southwest Conference Tournament MVP

- Jason Tolman (1995)

NCAA Division I Regional Tournament MVP

- Kurt Wilson (2021, Lubbock)
- Cam Warren (2019, Lubbock)
- Zach Rheams (2018, Lubbock)
- Hayden Howard (2016, Lubbock)
- Dylan Dusek (2014, Coral Gables)

Skip Bertman Award

- Tim Tadlock (2014)

=== Retired jerseys ===
Number	Player	Seasons
22	Brooks Wallace	1977–1980
23	Clint Bryant	1993–1996
24	Kal Segrist	1968–1983
27	Larry Hays	1987–2008

== Red Raiders in the Major Leagues ==
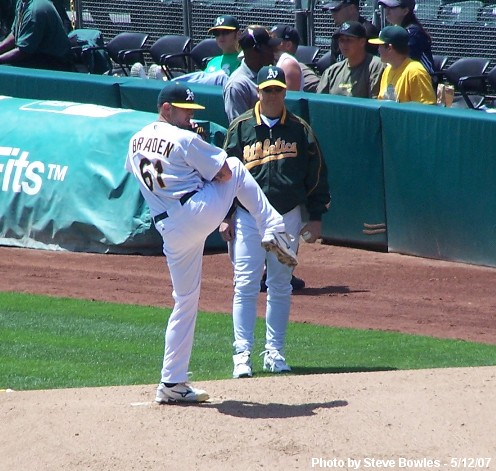
Dallas Braden with Oakland

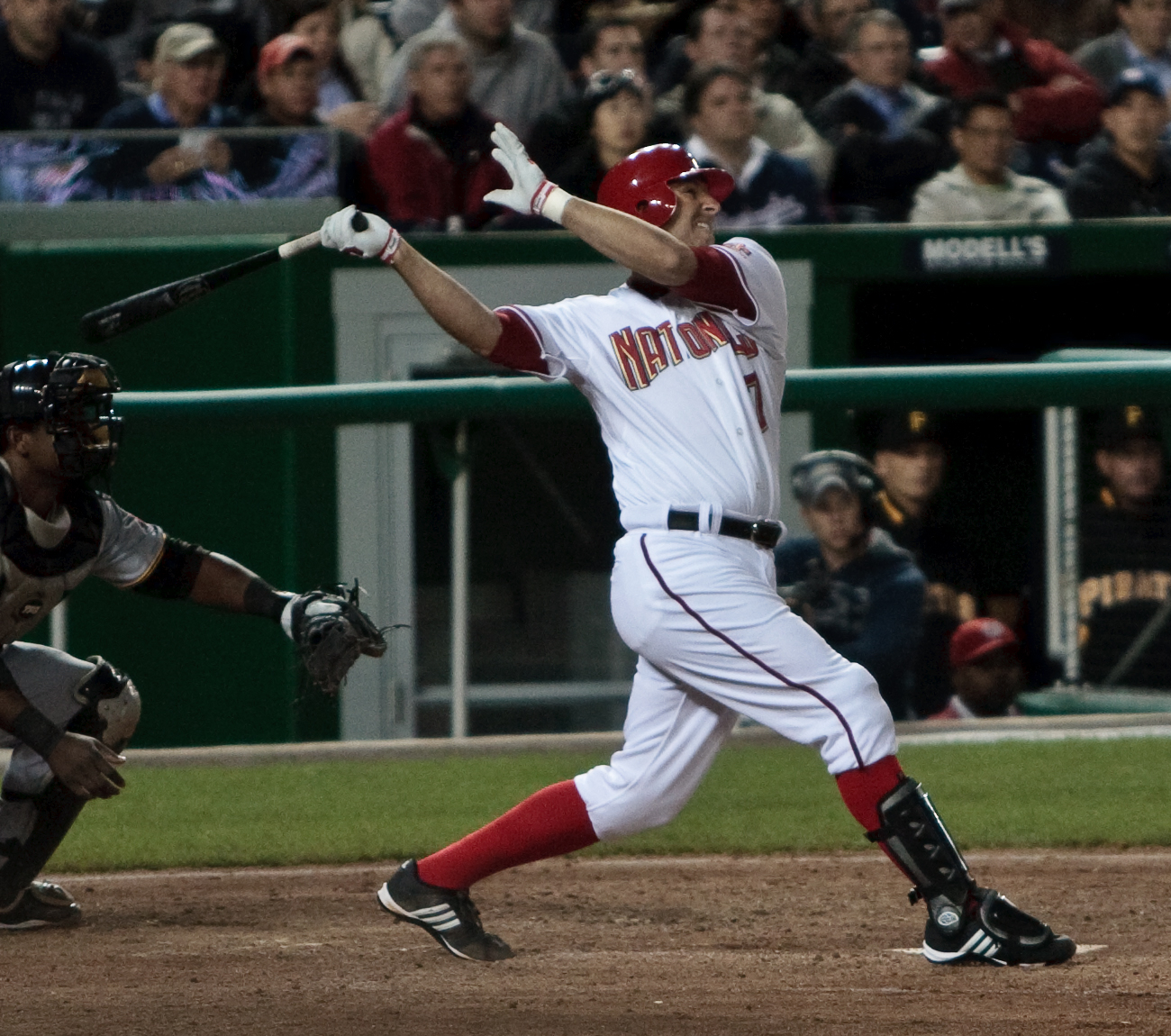
Josh Bard with Washington

At least 40 former Texas Tech Red Raiders have gone on to play Major League Baseball.

Player	MLB Career Dates	Round Drafted	Team Drafted
Chuck Harrison	1965–1969, 1971	N/A	N/A
Doug Ault	1976–1980	Free Agent	Texas Rangers
Donald Harris	1991–1993	1st (5th pick)	Texas Rangers
Mike Humphreys	1991–1993	15th	San Diego Padres
Mark Brandenburg	1995–1997	26th	Texas Rangers
Ryan Nye	1997–1998	2nd	Philadelphia Phillies
Travis Smith	1998–2006	19th	Milwaukee Brewers
Brandon Kolb	2000–2001	38th	Oakland Athletics
Keith Ginter	2000–2005	10th	Houston Astros
Stubby Clapp	2001 2019–present (Coach)	36th	St. Louis Cardinals
Matt Miller	2001–2002	2nd	Detroit Tigers
Trey Lunsford	2002–2003	33rd	San Francisco Giants
Travis Driskill	2002–2005, 2007	4th	Cleveland Indians
Josh Bard	2002–2011 2016–present (Coach)	3rd	Colorado Rockies
Steve Watkins	2004	16th	San Diego Padres
Joe Dillon	2005, 2007–2009 2018–present (Coach)	7th	Kansas City Royals
Chris Sampson	2006–2009	8th	Houston Astros
Jeff Karstens	2006–2012	19th	New York Yankees
Dallas Braden	2007–2011	24th	Oakland Athletics
Dustin Richardson	2009–2010	5th	Boston Red Sox
Josh Tomlin	2010–2021	19th	Cleveland Indians
Zach Stewart	2011–2012	3rd	Cincinnati Reds
AJ Ramos	2012–2018, 2020–2021	21st	Florida Marlins
Roger Kieschnick	2013–2014	3rd	San Francisco Giants
Nathan Karns	2013–2017, 2019	12th	Washington Nationals
Chad Bettis	2013–2019	2nd	Colorado Rockies
Danny Coulombe	2014–2018, 2020–present	25th	Los Angeles Dodgers
Kelby Tomlinson	2015–2018	12th	San Francisco Giants
Robert Dugger	2019–2022	18th	Seattle Mariners
Parker Mushinski	2022–2024	7th	Houston Astros
Davis Martin	2022–present	14th	Chicago White Sox
Caleb Kilian	2022–present	77th	San Francisco Giants
Josh Jung	2022–present	1st	Texas Rangers
John McMillon	2023–2024	11th	Detroit Tigers
Jace Jung	2024-present	1st	Detroit Tigers
Clayton Beeter	2024-present	CB-B	New York Yankees
Mason Montgomery	2024-present	6th	Tampa Bay Rays
Hunter Dobbins	2025-present	8th	Boston Red Sox
Braxton Fulford	2025-present	6th	Colorado Rockies
Andrew Morris	2026-present	4th	Minnesota Twins

=== Pro Red Raiders in other sports ===
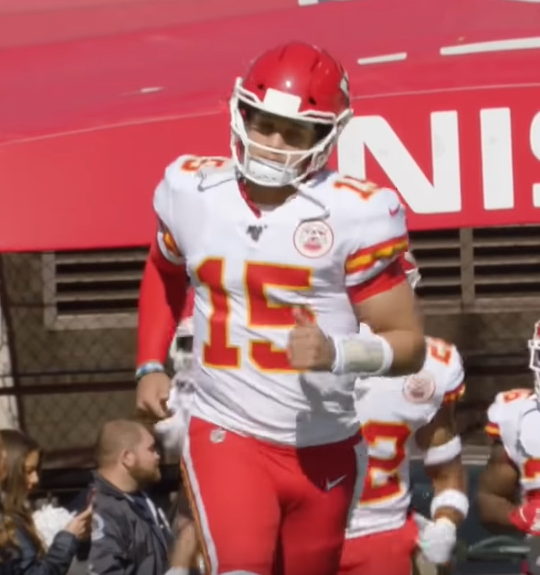
Former Texas Tech football player and Kansas City Chiefs quarterback Patrick Mahomes was also a baseball player at TTU

Player	Years	Baseball Position	Position in other sport	League	Team
Patrick Mahomes	2015	Relief pitcher	Quarterback	NFL	Kansas City Chiefs

== See also ==
- List of NCAA Division I baseball programs
- Brooks Wallace Award
- List of college baseball awards
