= 2009 Texas Longhorns baseball team =

American college baseball season

2009 Texas Longhorns baseball

Austin super regional champions Austin Regional champions Big 12 Regular season champions Big 12 tournament champions

College World Series, Finals (1–2)
- Conference: Big 12 Conference

Ranking
- Coaches: No. 2
- CB: No. 2
- Record: 50–16–1 (17–9–1 Big 12)
- Head coach: Augie Garrido (13th season)
- Assistant coaches: Tommy Harmon (20th season); Skip Johnson (3rd season)
- Home stadium: UFCU Disch–Falk Field

2009 Big 12 Conference baseball standings
	Conf.				Overall
Team	W		L	PCT	W		L	PCT
No. 2 Texas ‍†‍‡‍^{y}	17	–	9	.654	50	–	16	.758
No. 19 Oklahoma ‍‍‍^{y}	17	–	10	.630	43	–	20	.683
Missouri ‍‍‍^{y}	16	–	11	.593	35	–	27	.565
No. 22 Kansas State ‍‍‍^{y}	14	–	11	.560	43	–	18	.705
Kansas ‍‍‍^{y}	15	–	12	.556	39	–	24	.619
Texas A&M ‍‍‍^{y}	14	–	13	.519	37	–	24	.607
Texas Tech ‍‍‍	12	–	15	.444	25	–	32	.439
Baylor ‍‍‍^{y}	10	–	16	.385	30	–	26	.536
No. 27 Oklahoma State ‍‍‍^{y}	9	–	16	.360	34	–	24	.586
Nebraska ‍‍‍	8	–	19	.296	25	–	28	.472
† – Conference champion ‡ – Tournament champion y – Invited to the NCAA tournament As of June 30, 2009; Rankings from Collegiate Baseball

The 2009 Texas Longhorns baseball team represented the University of Texas at Austin in the 2009 NCAA Division I baseball season. The Longhorns played their home games at UFCU Disch–Falk Field. Texas finished the regular season as the No. 1 team in the Big 12 Conference and the No. 5 team nationally. The Longhorns won the 2009 Big 12 Conference baseball tournament to earn an automatic bid to the 2009 NCAA Division I baseball tournament, defeating the Missouri Tigers 12–7 in the final. Texas was selected as the No. 1 seed in the Austin super regional, and as the No. 1 National Seed overall. Texas went 5–1 in the Regionals, with their one loss coming to TCU in the super regional. They defeated the Horned Frogs in the regional final to advance to the College World Series, marking their 32nd appearance all-time, and first since 2005.

The Longhorns defeated Southern Miss and Arizona State, beating the Sun Devils twice, to advance to the finals of the College World Series, where they faced the LSU Tigers. The Tigers were 8–0 at that point in the tournament, going 5–0 in the Baton Rouge super regional, and defeating Virginia and Arkansas (twice) to advance to the final. The Tigers became National Champions after defeating the Longhorns 11–4 in a decisive Game 3.

== Previous season ==
In 2008, Texas finished the season ranked at No. 25 nationally with a record of 37–24, going 15–12 in Big 12 play to claim sole possession of fifth place in the Big 12 Conference. The Longhorns were invited to the 2008 NCAA Division I baseball tournament as an at-large bid, and were placed in the Houston super regional as the No. 2 seed in the Houston Regional. Texas defeated Sam Houston State and St. John's in the first two rounds, but were ousted by super regional host Rice in the Regional Final.

== Roster ==
2009 Texas Longhorns baseball team
Players
Coaches

#	Pos.	Name	B/T	Height	Weight	Year	Previous school	Home town
13	INF	Brandon Belt	L/L	6 ft 5 in (1.96 m)	205 lb (93 kg)	Jr	Hudson HS	Lufkin, TX
40	LHP	Riley Boening	L/L	6 ft 3 in (1.91 m)	210 lb (95 kg)	So	Yoakum HS	Yoakum, TX
32	RHP	Kendal Carrillo	R/R	6 ft 0 in (1.83 m)	190 lb (86 kg)	So	Sweetwater HS	Sweetwater, TX
7	C	Preston Clark	R/R	5 ft 11 in (1.8 m)	215 lb (98 kg)	RS Sr	Rockwall HS	Rockwall, TX
28	RHP	Austin Dicharry	R/R	6 ft 4 in (1.93 m)	195 lb (88 kg)	Fr	Klein Collins HS	Spring, TX
17	INF	Jordan Etier	R/R	5 ft 11 in (1.8 m)	175 lb (79 kg)	Fr	Westlake HS	Austin, TX
38	C	J.T. Files	R/R	6 ft 0 in (1.83 m)	195 lb (88 kg)	Fr	Poteet HS	Mesquite, TX
43	C	Robert Fondren	R/R	5 ft 11 in (1.8 m)	170 lb (77 kg)	Fr	The Kinkaid School	Houston, TX
24	RHP	Cole Green	R/R	6 ft 0 in (1.83 m)	210 lb (95 kg)	So	Coppell HS	Coppell, TX
27	RHP	Hunter Harris	R/R	6 ft 1 in (1.85 m)	200 lb (91 kg)	RS Jr	Gladewater HS	Big Sandy, TX
39	INF	David Hernandez	R/R	6 ft 1 in (1.85 m)	160 lb (73 kg)	Sr	Monte Vista HS	Danville, CA
26	RHP	Taylor Jungmann	R/R	6 ft 6 in (1.98 m)	195 lb (88 kg)	Fr	Georgetown HS	Temple, TX
45	OF	Ben Kaplan	L/R	5 ft 11 in (1.8 m)	165 lb (75 kg)	So	Windward School	Santa Monica, CA
29	OF	Kevin Keyes	R/R	6 ft 4 in (1.93 m)	225 lb (102 kg)	So	Connally HS	Austin, TX
11	INF	Brandon Loy	R/R	6 ft 0 in (1.83 m)	170 lb (77 kg)	Fr	Rowlett HS	Rowlett, TX
14	INF	Kevin Lusson	S/R	6 ft 1 in (1.85 m)	205 lb (93 kg)	Fr	McCallum HS	Austin, TX
6	OF	Kyle Lusson	R/R	5 ft 11 in (1.8 m)	185 lb (84 kg)	Jr	McCallum HS	Austin, TX
8	OF	Tim Maitland	R/R	5 ft 11 in (1.8 m)	165 lb (75 kg)	Fr	Heritage HS	Colleyville, TX
57	LHP	Andrew McKirahan	R/L	6 ft 2 in (1.88 m)	195 lb (88 kg)	Fr	Georgetown HS	Georgetown, TX
4	OF	Morgan Mickan	R/R	6 ft 0 in (1.83 m)	190 lb (86 kg)	Fr	Georgetown HS	Georgetown, TX
15	OF	Russell Moldenhauer	L/R	5 ft 11 in (1.8 m)	215 lb (98 kg)	Jr	Boerne HS	Boerne, TX
10	OF	Connor Rowe	R/R	5 ft 10 in (1.78 m)	170 lb (77 kg)	So	Georgetown HS	Georgetown, TX
31	RHP	Chance Ruffin	R/R	6 ft 1 in (1.85 m)	185 lb (84 kg)	So	Lake Travis HS	Austin, TX
3	C	Cameron Rupp	R/R	6 ft 2 in (1.88 m)	235 lb (107 kg)	So	Prestonwood Christian Academy	Plano, TX
36	INF	Tant Shepherd	R/R	5 ft 11 in (1.8 m)	210 lb (95 kg)	So	Flower Mound HS	Flower Mound, TX
35	LHP	Keith Shinaberry	R/L	6 ft 4 in (1.93 m)	200 lb (91 kg)	Sr	Austin HS	Austin, TX
19	LHP	Sam Stafford	L/L	6 ft 4 in (1.93 m)	190 lb (86 kg)	Fr	Klein Collins HS	Spring, TX
34	RHP	Stayton Thomas	R/R	5 ft 11 in (1.8 m)	175 lb (79 kg)	So	Corsicana HS	Corsicana, TX
9	INF	Michael Torres	R/R	5 ft 10 in (1.78 m)	180 lb (82 kg)	Sr	Mater Dei HS	Santa Ana, CA
2	INF	Travis Tucker	R/R	5 ft 10 in (1.78 m)	185 lb (84 kg)	Sr	Ellison HS	Killeen, TX
46	C	Hunter Wilcox	R/R	6 ft 1 in (1.85 m)	185 lb (84 kg)	Fr	Austin HS	Austin, TX
44	LHP	Austin Wood	R/L	6 ft 2 in (1.88 m)	190 lb (86 kg)	Sr	Kingwood HS	Kingwood, TX
41	C	Erik Woody	R/R	5 ft 9 in (1.75 m)	150 lb (68 kg)	Jr	Hightower HS	Missouri City, TX
12	RHP	Brandon Workman	R/R	6 ft 5 in (1.96 m)	220 lb (100 kg)	So	Bowie HS	Bowie, TX

Head coach

Augie Garrido

Assistant coach(es)

Tommy Harmon
Skip Johnson

Legend

- (C) Team captain
- (S) Suspended
- (I) Ineligible
- Injured
- Current redshirt

Roster
Last update: July 8, 2013

== Schedule ==
Legend
	Texas win
	Texas loss
	Tie
	Postponement
**Bold**	Texas team member

2009 Texas Longhorns baseball game log
Regular season
February

#	Date	Opponent	Site/stadium	Score	Win	Loss	Save	Attendance	Overall record	Big 12 record
1	February 20	UIC	UFCU Disch-Falk Field	6–1	**Ruffin** (1–0)	Kovacevich (0–1)		5,333	1–0	0–0
2	February 21	UIC	UFCU Disch-Falk Field	3–1	**Wood** (1–0)	Kool (0–1)		5,552	2–0	0–0
3	February 21	UIC	UFCU Disch-Falk Field	10–1 ^{(7)}	**Jungmann** (1–0)	Riegler (0–1)		5,414	3–0	0–0
4	February 22	UIC	UFCU Disch-Falk Field	1–0	**Workman** (1–0)	Worthington (0–1)	**Wood** (1)	5,282	4–0	0–0
5	February 24	Texas–Arlington	UFCU Disch-Falk Field	4–3	**Wood** (2–0)	Mitchell (1–1)		4,857	5–0	0–0
6	February 27	Penn State	UFCU Disch-Falk Field	9–2	**Ruffin** (2–0)	Lorentson (0–2)		5,469	6–0	0–0
7	February 28	Penn State	UFCU Disch-Falk Field	6–2	**Jungmann** (2–0)	Kelley (1–1)	**Wood** (2)	6,421	7–0	0–0
8	February 28	Penn State	UFCU Disch-Falk Field	1–0	**Green** (1–0)	Macy (0–1)	**Wood** (3)	6,553	8–0	0–0

March

#	Date	Opponent	Site/stadium	Score	Win	Loss	Save	Attendance	Overall record	Big 12 record
9	March 1	Penn State	UFCU Disch-Falk Field	9–0	**Workman** (2–0)	Grumley (0–1)		5,491	9–0	0–0
10	March 3	@ Texas State	Bobcat Ballpark	6–5	**Wood** (3–0)	Brundridge (0–1)		2,593	10–0	0–0
11	March 6	@ Stanford	Sunken Diamond	6–5	**Ruffin** (3–0)	Inman (0-–)		1,835	11–0	0–0
12	March 7	@ Stanford	Sunken Diamond	1–7	Pries (2–0)	**Workman** (2–1)		2,264	11–1	0–0
13	March 8	@ Stanford	Sunken Diamond	5–1	**Green** (2–0)	Snodgress (0–1)		2,252	12–1	0–0
14	March 14	Missouri	UFCU Disch-Falk Field	0–2	Gibson (3–1)	**Ruffin** (3–1)		6,547	12–2	0–1
15	March 14	Missouri	UFCU Disch-Falk Field	5–0	**Workman** (3–1)	Berger (1–2)		6,032	13–2	1–1
16	March 15	Missouri	UFCU Disch-Falk Field	4–3	**Jungmann** (3–0)	Hicks (0–1)		6,987	14–2	2–1
17	March 17	@ Rice	Reckling Park	3–6	Rogers (4–1)	**Dicharry** (0–1)	Ojala (1)	6,193	14–3	2–1
18	March 20	@ Kansas	Hoglund Ballpark	4–5	Hall (2–1)	**Ruffin** (3–2)	Smyth (4)	1,041	14–4	2–2
19	March 21	@ Kansas	Hoglund Ballpark	3–4	Blankenship (2–0)	**Jungmann** (3–1)	Smyth (5)	926	14–5	2–3
20	March 22	@ Kansas	Hoglund Ballpark	3–4	Blankenship (3–0)	**Jungmann** (3–2)	Smyth (6)	871	14–6	2–4
21	March 24	Dallas Baptist	UFCU Disch-Falk Field	3–0	**Dicharry** (1–1)	Black (3–1)	**Ruffin** (1)	4,902	15–6	2–4
22	March 27	Texas Tech	UFCU Disch-Falk Field	9–5	**Ruffin** (4–2)	Morgan (1–4)	**Wood** (4)	6,220	16–6	3–4
23	March 28	Texas Tech	UFCU Disch-Falk Field	2–4	Ramos (3–1)	**Workman** (3–2)	Bettis (3)	6,741	16–7	3–5
24	March 29	Texas Tech	UFCU Disch-Falk Field	8–1	**Dicharry** (2–1)	Karns (1–3)		6,665	17–7	4–5
25	March 31	Oral Roberts	UFCU Disch-Falk Field	5–4	**Wood** (4–0)	Dunn (1–3)		4,860	18–7	4–5

April

#	Date	Opponent	Site/stadium	Score	Win	Loss	Save	Attendance	Overall record	Big 12 record
26	April 3	@ No. 17 Oklahoma State	Allie P. Reynolds Stadium	7–2	**Ruffin** (5–2)	Oliver (4–3)	**Wood** (5)	2,114	19–7	5–5
27	April 4	@ No. 17 Oklahoma State	Allie P. Reynolds Stadium	1–7	Blandford (6–0)	**Workman** (3–3)		2,612	19–8	5–6
28	April 5	@ No. 17 Oklahoma State	Allie P. Reynolds Stadium	8–5	**Wood** (5–0)	Lyons (4–3)		482	20–8	6–6
29	April 7	No. 19 TCU	UFCU Disch-Falk Field	6–0	**Dicharry** (3–1)	Holle (3–1)		5,929	21–8	6–6
–	April 9	@ Nebraska	**Postponed** Rescheduled for April 10							
30	April 10	@ Nebraska	Haymarket Park	7–5	**Shinaberry** (1–0)	Yost (1–3)	**Wood** (7)	5,285	22–8	7–6
31	April 10	@ Nebraska	Haymarket Park	11–7	**Carrillo** (1–0)	Roualdes (0–1)		5,297	23–8	8–6
32	April 11	@ Nebraska	Haymarket Park	9–2	**Green** (3–0)	Hauptman (2–3)		5,219	24–8	9–6
33	April 14	Texas A&M–Corpus Christi	UFCU Disch-Falk Field	5–2	**Dicharry** (4–1)	Grota (2–2)	**Wood** (8)	5,311	25–8	9–6
34	April 15	Texas A&M–Corpus Christi	UFCU Disch-Falk Field	8–1	**Thomas** (1–0)	Carnline (3–4)		4,893	26–8	9–6
–	April 17	No. 10 Oklahoma	**Postponed** Rescheduled for April 18							
35	April 18	No. 10 Oklahoma	UFCU Disch-Falk Field	7–3	**Ruffin** (6–2)	Doyle (5–3)	**Wood** (9)	7,412	27–8	10–6
36	April 18	No. 10 Oklahoma	UFCU Disch-Falk Field	6–2	**Dicharry** (5–1)	Porlier (1–1)		7,531	28–8	11–6
37	April 19	No. 10 Oklahoma	UFCU Disch-Falk Field	8–5 ^{(8)}	**Jungmann** (4–2)	Anderson (0–1)	**Wood** (10)	7,313	29–8	12–6
38	April 21	No. 2 Rice	UFCU Disch-Falk Field	2–7	Wright (3–0)	**Green** (3–1)	Wall (1)	7,366	29–9	12–6
39	April 24	No. 23 Kansas State	UFCU Disch-Falk Field	2–4	Morris (10–0)	**Wood** (4–1)		5,473	29–10	12–7
40	April 25	No. 23 Kansas State	UFCU Disch-Falk Field	4–5 ^{(12)}	Applegate (2–1)	**Jungmann** (4–3)		6,344	29–11	12–8
41	April 26	No. 23 Kansas State	UFCU Disch-Falk Field	6–6 ^{(10)}				5,552	29–11–1	12–8–1
42	April 28	Texas State	UFCU Disch-Falk Field	12–2	**Thomas** (2–0)	Carruth (3–2)		5,495	30–11–1	12–8–1

May

#	Date	Opponent	Site/stadium	Score	Win	Loss	Save	Attendance	Overall record	Big 12 record
43	May 1	No. 17 Baylor	UFCU Disch-Falk Field	12–4	**Ruffin** (7–2)	Volz (3–5)	**Wood** (11)	6,852	31–11–1	13–8–1
44	May 2	No. 17 Baylor	UFCU Disch-Falk Field	19–11	**Green** (4–1)	Miller (3–3)		4,812	32–11–1	14–8–1
45	May 3	No. 17 Baylor	UFCU Disch-Falk Field	3–1	**Jungmann** (5–3)	Kempf (4–3)	**Wood** (12)	3,858	33–11–1	15–8–1
46	May 6	Texas Southern	UFCU Disch-Falk Field	7–3	**Thomas** (3–0)	Carcamo (2–3)		5,085	34–11–1	15–8–1
47	May 8	@ No. 14 Texas A&M	Olsen Field	11–9 ^{(10)}	**Wood** (5–1)	Wilson (5–6)	**Dicharry** (1)	8,343	35–11–1	16–8–1
48	May 9	No. 14 Texas A&M	UFCU Disch-Falk Field	0–3	Hales (5–1)	**Green** (4–2)		7,384	35–12–1	16–9–1
49	May 10	No. 14 Texas A&M	UFCU Disch-Falk Field	5–4	**Dicharry** (4–1)	Loux (3–2)	**Wood** (13)	7,613	36–12–1	17–9–1
50	May 17	Alabama A&M	UFCU Disch-Falk Field	5–1	**Ruffin** (8–2)	Hernandez (4–6)		5,157	37–12–1	17–9–1
51	May 17	Alabama A&M	UFCU Disch-Falk Field	9–3	**Jungmann** (6–3)	Toone (0–3)		5,916	38–12–1	17–9–1

Postseason
Big 12 tournament

#	Date	Opponent	Site/stadium	Score	Win	Loss	Save	Attendance	Overall record	Tourn. record
52	May 20	Baylor	Bricktown Ballpark	9–14	Fritsch (3–5)	**Dicharry** (6–2)	Volz (1)	4,351	38–13–1	0–1
53	May 21	Kansas	Bricktown Ballpark	9–3	**Ruffin** (9–2)	Walz (8–2)		4,396	39–13–1	1–1
54	May 23	Kansas State	Bricktown Ballpark	4–2	**Jungmann** (7–3)	Applegate (2–2)	**Wood** (14)	5,720	40–13–1	2–1
55	May 24	Missouri	Bricktown Ballpark	12–7	**Dicharry** (7–2)	Hicks (5–3)		5,316	41–13–1	3–1

NCAA Austin Regional

#	Date	Opponent	Site/stadium	Score	Win	Loss	Save	Attendance	Overall record	NCAAT record
56	May 29	Army	UFCU Disch-Falk Field	3–1	**Green** (5–2)	Fouch (7–4)	**Wood** (15)	6,832	42–13–1	1–0
57	May 30	Boston College	UFCU Disch-Falk Field	3–2 ^{(25)}	**Dicharry** (8–2)	Dennhardt (5–2)		7,104	43–13–1	2–0
58	May 31	Army	UFCU Disch-Falk Field	14–10	**Thomas** (4–0)	Fouch (7–5)		7,034	44–13–1	3–0

NCAA Austin super regional

#	Date	Opponent	Site/stadium	Score	Win	Loss	Save	Attendance	Overall record	NCAAT record
59	June 6	TCU	UFCU Disch-Falk Field	10–4	**Ruffin** (10–2)	Winkler (7–1)		7,220	45–13–1	4–0
60	June 7	TCU	UFCU Disch-Falk Field	2–3	Gerrish (6–2)	**Green** (5–3)	Marshall (9)	7,205	45–14–1	4–1
61	June 8	TCU	UFCU Disch-Falk Field	5–2	**Jungmann** (8–3)	Lockwood (4–2)	**Ruffin** (2)	7,241	46–14–1	5–1

College World Series

#	Date	Opponent	Site/stadium	Score	Win	Loss	Save	Attendance	Overall record	NCAAT record
62	June 14	Southern Miss	Rosenblatt Stadium	7–6	**Jungmann** (9–3)	Fields (2–1)		24,142	47–14–1	6–1
63	June 16	Arizona State	Rosenblatt Stadium	10–6	**Jungmann** (10–3)	Lambson (9–4)		24,152	48–14–1	7–1
64	June 19	Arizona State	Rosenblatt Stadium	4–3	**Wood** (6–1)	Lambson (9–5)		23,257	49–14–1	8–1
65	June 22	LSU	Rosenblatt Stadium	6–7 ^{(11)}	Ott (4–2)	**Workman** (3–4)		23,019	49–15–1	8–2
66	June 23	LSU	Rosenblatt Stadium	5–1	**Jungmann** (11–3)	Ross (6–8)		21,871	50–15–1	9–2
67	June 24	LSU	Rosenblatt Stadium	4–11	Ranaudo (12–3)	**Workman** (3–5)		19,986	50–16–1	9–3

2009 Texas Longhorns Baseball Schedule http://www.texassports.com/sports/m-basebl/archive/tex-m-basebl-sched-2008.html

== Postseason ==
=== Big 12 tournament ===
	Division A	UT	KSU	KU	Bay	Overall
1	Texas		4-2	9-3	9-14	2-1*
4	Kansas State	2-4		5-4	9-4	2-1
5	Kansas	3-9	4-5		4-8	0-3
8	Baylor	14-9	4–9	8-4		2-1

	Division B	OU	Mizzou	A&M	TTU	Overall
2	Oklahoma		4-5	15-17	5-2	1-2
3	Missouri	5-4		5-2	2-4	2-1*
6	Texas A&M	17-15	2-5		11-4	2-1
7	Texas Tech	2-5	4-2	4-11		1-2

Finals
A	Texas	12
B	Missouri	7

- Missouri advances due to tournament tiebreaker.
- Texas advances due to tournament tiebreaker.
- Oklahoma State and Nebraska did not make the tournament.

=== NCAA tournament ===
Hosted by Texas at UFCU Disch–Falk Field

Regional	Regional
1	Texas	3
4	Army	1
1	Texas	3^{25 (Note: The second round game between Texas and Boston College went 25 innings, the longest game in NCAA History.)}
3	Boston College	2
3	Boston College	8
2	Texas State	7
Austin Regional – UFCU Disch–Falk Field
4	Army	7
2	Texas State	4
4	Army	4
3	Boston College	3
1	TCU	6
4	Wright State	3
1	TCU	13
3	Oregon State	1
3	Oregon State	9
2	Texas A&M	8
Fort Worth Regional – Lupton Stadium
4	Wright State	4
2	Texas A&M	6^{11}
2	Texas A&M	6
3	Oregon State	13

Regional finals
1	Texas	14	—
4	Army	10	—
1	TCU	5	—
3	Oregon State	4	—

Super regionals
1	Texas	10	2	5
TCU	4	3	2

==== College World Series ====
First round
2	Cal State Fullerton	6
Arkansas	10
Virginia	5
3	LSU	9
2	Cal State Fullerton	5
Virginia	7
1	Texas	7
Southern Miss	6
5	Arizona State	5*
4	North Carolina	2*
Southern Miss	4
4	North Carolina	11

Second round
Arkansas	1
3	LSU	9
Virginia	3*
Arkansas	4*
1	Texas	10
5	Arizona State	6
4	North Carolina	5
5	Arizona State	12

Semifinals
3	LSU	14	-
Arkansas	5	-
1	Texas	4	-
5	Arizona State	3	-

Finals
3	LSU	7^{11}	1	11
1	Texas	6	5	4

== Rankings ==
Ranking movement Legend: ██ Increase in ranking. ██ Decrease in ranking. NR = Not ranked. RV = Received votes.
Poll	Pre- season	Feb. 23	Mar. 2	Mar. 9	Mar. 16	Mar. 23	Mar. 30	Apr. 6	Apr. 13	Apr. 20	Apr. 27	May 4	May 11	May 18	May 25	June 2	June 8	Final Poll
USA Today/ESPN Coaches' Poll (Top 25)*	–	–	–	–	–	–	–	–	–	–	–	–	–	–	–	–	–	2
Baseball America (Top 25)	4	4	2	1	1	9	9	9	9	5	8	8	6	5	5	4	4	2
Collegiate Baseball (Top 30)^	10	8	4	4	2	17	14	14	11	6	16	8	6	6	5	4	5	2
NCBWA (Top 30)	8	7	4	3	2	9	9	9	6	2	10	8	7	6	5	4	5	2

^ Collegiate Baseball ranked 35 teams in their preseason poll, but only ranked 30 teams weekly during the season.

* Only the final Coaches' poll from the 2009 season is currently available.

== Notes ==
- Texas' 3–2 win in the regionals against Boston College went 25 innings, marking the longest game in NCAA Baseball history.
- Freshman pitcher Taylor Jungmann, outfielder/designated hitter Russell Moldenhauer, and catcher Cameron Rupp were named to the College World Series All-Tournament Team.

== Statistics ==
Below are the player statistics for the 2009 Texas Longhorns baseball team.

=== Batting ===
Note: G = Games played; AB = At bats; R = Runs; H = Hits; 2B = Doubles; 3B = Triples; HR = Home runs; RBI = Runs batted in; AVG = Batting average; OBP = On-base percentage; SLG = Slugging percentage; BB = walks; K = Strikeouts; HBP = Hit by pitches

Player	G	AB	R	H	2B	3B	HR	RBI	AVG	OBP	SLG	BB	K	HBP
Brandon Belt	63	235	47	76	17	3	8	43	.323	.425	.523	40	37	5
Kevin Keyes	65	213	46	65	17	1	9	46	.305	.405	.521	31	55	6
Michael Torres	63	245	36	73	11	2	5	33	.298	.356	.420	21	27	4
Travis Tucker	65	266	52	79	12	2	3	30	.297	.385	.391	26	31	12
Cameron Rupp	63	216	46	63	13	0	11	46	.292	.387	.505	31	53	3
Brandon Loy	67	233	34	67	8	1	0	30	.288	.369	.330	27	28	6
Preston Clark	52	161	24	45	13	0	3	27	.280	.365	.416	20	30	4
Connor Rowe	63	195	33	54	7	2	8	40	.277	.330	.456	14	45	3
Tant Shepherd	55	150	27	39	13	2	2	21	.260	.362	.413	19	30	6
Cole Green	1	1	0	1	0	0	0	0	1.000	1.000	1.000	0	0	0
Kevin Lusson	19	42	13	13	4	0	0	11	.310	.491	.405	15	5	0
David Hernandez	36	99	10	27	0	0	0	12	.273	.327	.273	9	9	0
Jordan Etier	14	15	6	4	0	0	0	2	.267	.313	.267	1	4	0
Russell Moldenhauer	44	84	10	22	5	0	4	14	.262	.406	.464	17	13	4
Tim Maitland	59	31	11	6	0	0	0	4	.194	.342	.194	1	10	6
Kyle Lusson	54	47	7	8	2	0	0	3	.170	.278	.213	6	15	1
Morgan Mickan	13	0	3	0	0	0	0	0	.000	1.000	.000	1	0	0

Player	G	AB	R	H	2B	3B	HR	RBI	AVG	OBP	SLG	BB	K	HBP
Totals	67	2233	405	642	122	13	53	362	.288	.377	.425	279	392	61
Opponents	67	2258	249	512	65	16	46	221	.227	.300	.331	189	556	53

=== Pitching ===
Note: W–L = Wins–losses; ERA = Earned run average; G = Games played; GS = Games started; CG = Complete games; SV = Saves; IP = Innings pitched; H = Hits allowed; R = Runs allowed; ER = Earned runs allowed; BB = Walks allowed; SO = Strikeouts; HR = Home runs allowed; BAA = Batting average against

Player	W–L	ERA	G	GS	CG	SV	IP	H	R	ER	BB	SO	HR	BAA
Taylor Jungmann	11–3	2.00	25	10	1	0	94.2	65	27	21	35	101	1	.193
Austin Wood	6–1	2.61	41	0	0	15	86.1	68	28	25	18	74	3	.219
Chance Ruffin	10–2	3.32	25	18	3	2	124.2	109	57	46	25	115	15	.230
Cole Green	5–3	3.34	21	20	1	0	110.1	98	45	41	34	85	12	.241
Brandon Workman	3–5	3.48	20	13	1	0	75.0	58	38	29	28	82	7	.210
Stayton Thomas	4–0	2.11	12	1	0	0	21.1	23	9	5	6	13	0	.291
Austin Dicharry	8–2	2.28	26	5	0	1	59.1	40	19	15	28	59	1	.189
Keith Shinaberry	1–0	2.53	13	0	0	0	10.2	15	7	3	2	2	3	.357
Kendal Carrillo	1–0	3.52	10	0	0	0	15.1	17	7	6	0	12	2	.293
Andrew McKirahan	1–0	5.68	11	0	0	0	12.2	17	9	8	7	12	2	.321
Sam Stafford	0–0	10.12	3	0	0	0	2.2	2	3	3	6	1	0	.222

Player	W-L	ERA	G	GS	CG	SV	IP	H	R	ER	BB	SO	HR	BAA
Totals	50–16	2.95	67	67	6	18	613.0	512	249	201	189	556	46	.227
Opponents	16–50	5.20	67	67	4	8	589.2	642	405	341	279	392	53	.288

=== Fielding ===
Note: PO = Putouts; A = Assists; E = Errors; FLD% = Fielding percentage; DPs = Double plays; SBA = Stolen bases attempted; CS = Caught stealing; CS% = Caught stealing percentage; PB = Passed balls; CI = Catcher's interference

Player	PO	A	E	FLD%	DPs	SBA	CS	CS%	PB	CI
Kyle Lusson	46	0	0	1.000	0	0	0	---	0	0
Tim Maitland	25	0	0	1.000	0	0	0	---	0	0
Taylor Jungmann	7	17	0	1.000	2	6	1	.857	0	0
Brandon Workman	4	14	0	1.000	0	9	4	.692	0	0
Jordan Etier	4	9	0	1.000	1	0	0	---	0	0
Kendal Carrillo	2	6	0	1.000	0	3	2	.600	0	0
Russell Moldenhauer	8	0	0	1.000	0	0	0	---	0	0
Keith Shinaberry	2	4	0	1.000	2	0	0	---	0	0
Andrew McKirahan	1	2	0	1.000	0	0	0	---	0	0
Sam Stafford	0	1	0	1.000	0	0	0	---	0	0
Preston Clark	197	13	2	.991	8	16	4	.800	1	0
Brandon Belt	569	36	7	.989	51	0	0	---	0	0
Cameron Rupp	443	33	6	.988	4	27	12	.692	11	1
Connor Rowe	128	4	2	.985	3	0	0	---	0	0
Kevin Keyes	87	2	2	.978	0	0	0	---	0	0
Travis Tucker	110	184	8	.974	48	0	0	---	0	0
Cole Green	7	21	1	.966	2	6	3	.667	0	0
Brandon Loy	86	182	10	.964	39	0	0	---	0	0
Chance Ruffin	7	13	1	.952	0	1	3	.250	0	0
Tant Shepherd	58	0	3	.951	0	0	0	---	0	0
Michael Torres	12	95	7	.939	8	0	0	---	0	0
Austin Wood	1	26	2	.931	1	8	3	.727	0	0
Austin Dicharry	3	8	1	.917	2	7	2	.778	0	0
David Hernandez	30	49	8	.908	7	0	0	---	0	0
Kevin Lusson	1	8	1	.900	0	0	0	---	0	0
Stayton Thomas	1	5	1	.857	0	3	1	.750	0	0
Morgan Mickan	0	0	0	.000	0	0	0	---	0	0

Player	PO	A	E	FLD%	DPs	SBA	CS	CS%	PB	CI
Totals	1839	732	62	.976	65	43	19	.694	12	1
Opponents	1769	769	79	.970	61	74	25	.747	9	4

== MLB draft ==
The following members of the 2009 Texas Longhorns baseball team were eventually selected in the Major League Baseball Draft.

Player	Position	Year	Round	Overall	MLB team
Brandon Belt	1B	2009	5th	147th	San Francisco Giants
Austin Wood	LHP	2009	5th	150th	Detroit Tigers
Chance Ruffin	RHP	2010	1st	48th	Detroit Tigers
Brandon Workman	RHP	2010	2nd	57th	Boston Red Sox
Cameron Rupp	C	2010	3rd	108th	Philadelphia Phillies
Cole Green	RHP	2010	4th	133rd	Detroit Tigers
Kevin Keyes	OF	2010	7th	206th	Washington Nationals
Connor Rowe	OF	2010	21st	626th	Washington Nationals
Russell Moldenhauer	OF	2010	24th	716th	Washington Nationals
Tant Shepherd	1B	2010	47th	1417th	Cincinnati Reds
Taylor Jungmann	RHP	2011	1st	12th	Milwaukee Brewers
Sam Stafford	LHP	2011	2nd	88th	New York Yankees
Brandon Loy	SS	2011	5th	167th	Detroit Tigers
Cole Green	RHP	2011	9th	295th	Cincinnati Reds
Andrew McKirahan	LHP	2011	21st	639th	Chicago Cubs
Tant Shepherd	1B	2011	24th	732nd	New York Mets
Austin Dicharry	RHP	2011	41st	1261st	Philadelphia Phillies
Stayton Thomas	RHP	2011	43rd	1320th	Tampa Bay Rays
Kevin Lusson	C	2011	45th	1380th	Tampa Bay Rays
Sam Stafford	LHP	2012	13th	426th	Texas Rangers
Austin Dicharry	RHP	2012	24th	744th	Washington Nationals
