= 2009 Kansas State Wildcats baseball team =

American college baseball season

2009 Kansas State Wildcats baseball
- Conference: Big 12 Conference

Ranking
- Coaches: No. 20
- AP: No. 22
- Record: 43–18–1 (14–11–1 Big 12)
- Head coach: Brad Hill
- Hitting coach: Andy Sawyers
- Pitching coach: Sean McCann
- Home stadium: Tointon Family Stadium

2009 Big 12 Conference baseball standings
	Conf.				Overall
Team	W		L	PCT	W		L	PCT
No. 2 Texas ‍†‍‡‍^{y}	17	–	9	.654	50	–	16	.758
No. 19 Oklahoma ‍‍‍^{y}	17	–	10	.630	43	–	20	.683
Missouri ‍‍‍^{y}	16	–	11	.593	35	–	27	.565
No. 22 Kansas State ‍‍‍^{y}	14	–	11	.560	43	–	18	.705
Kansas ‍‍‍^{y}	15	–	12	.556	39	–	24	.619
Texas A&M ‍‍‍^{y}	14	–	13	.519	37	–	24	.607
Texas Tech ‍‍‍	12	–	15	.444	25	–	32	.439
Baylor ‍‍‍^{y}	10	–	16	.385	30	–	26	.536
No. 27 Oklahoma State ‍‍‍^{y}	9	–	16	.360	34	–	24	.586
Nebraska ‍‍‍	8	–	19	.296	25	–	28	.472
† – Conference champion ‡ – Tournament champion y – Invited to the NCAA tournament As of June 30, 2009; Rankings from Collegiate Baseball

The 2009 Kansas State Wildcats baseball team represented Kansas State University in the NCAA Division I college baseball season of 2009. It was the 109th baseball season in school history.

The team's head coach was Brad Hill who was in his sixth season at Kansas State. He was previously the head coach at Central Missouri State before coming to Manhattan in 2004.

Kansas State made the NCAA tournament for the first time in school history. The team finished the season by setting the school's record for wins, eight more than the previous school record of 35 in 1976.

== Preseason ==
The Wildcats, who recorded the most conference victories and its highest conference finish (tied for sixth) since 2002, return five pitchers who combined for 21 starts last season. The Wildcats will have junior A.J. Morris along with seniors Lance Hoge and Todd Vogel, while sophomore Thomas Rooke, who tied for fifth in school history with 25 appearances out of the bullpen last year, could be called upon to start some games this year for the Wildcats.

Offensively, K-State returns four of its top five hitters from a year ago, including junior infielder Justin Bloxom and senior outfielder Dane Yelovich. Bloxom led K-State in virtually every offensive category last season, including batting average (.288), hits (63), RBI (49), triples (2), total bases (105), total plate appearances (252), at bats (219), games played (58) and games started (57). Yelovich finished with a .286 average and stole 18 bases, good for fourth in the Big 12 Conference.

Alongside Bloxom in the infield is expected to be sophomore Carter Jurica at second base, converted outfielder Jason King at third, while senior Drew Biery will man shortstop for the second-consecutive year.

The outfield will feature Yelovich in center field, while fellow senior, Jordan Cruz, will return to right field after beginning the 2008 season as the starter. Left field will be a battle between junior Adam Muenster and true freshman Nick Martini. Muenster, who will be a switch-hitter this season, could also see time at second base.

Rob Vaughn, a two-year starter at catcher, returns for his senior campaign, while a pair of juniors, Daniel Dellasega and David Masters will also see playing time behind the plate.

== Season ==
=== Regular season ===
Head Coach Brad Hill, in his sixth season at K-State, earned Big 12 Coach of the Year honors as he guided Kansas State to a 39-win season, including 14 conference victories to finish fourth in the league, all school bests. The team also earned their highest ranking in school history as they were number 10 in the Baseball America Top 25 earlier in the season. A.J. Morris won Big 12 pitcher of year, the first Wildcat ever to do so. Morris finished the regular season as the Big 12 leader in both wins (12) and ERA (1.61). He was also first in innings pitched (100.2), third in opponent batting average (.203) and tied for fifth in strikeouts (91). Morris became the first player in school history to be named a semifinalist for the Dick Howser Trophy. Brad Hill became the first Kansas State coach since Mike Clark in 1990 to be named conference coach of the year.

Carter Jurica earned second-team accolades from the coaches after leading the conference's top hitting team with a .366 average, which was third in the Big 12 individually. Jurica also finished the regular season third in stolen bases (21), fourth in hits (78), and fifth in both runs scored (57) and on-base percentage (.442). Seniors Drew Biery and Jordan Cruz, junior Justin Bloxom, sophomore Jason King and freshman Nick Martini were each named honorable mention All-Big 12.

Kansas State was tied for 12th nationally with 39 wins. Kansas State has recorded 136 steals this season, the second-most in school history. The Wildcats have recorded 20 triples this season, which are tops in the Big 12, and the most by a K-State team since 1997.

=== Conference tournament ===
The Wildcats earned a berth in the Big 12 baseball tournament for the second year in a row. The tournament was held at AT&T Bricktown Ballpark in Oklahoma City Oklahoma.

Kansas State first beat Kansas by a score of 5–4. They then beat Baylor, 9–4. They faced Texas next for the right to play in the tournament championship. The Wildcats fell short, 2–4.

=== NCAA tournament ===
The Wildcats earned their first ever berth in the NCAA baseball tournament. They competed in the Houston Regional, with Rice University playing host, at Reckling Park. The other teams were Rice, Xavier, and Sam Houston State. They lost the regional final against Rice.

== Roster ==
Pitchers: Jame Allen; Matt Applegate; Kayvon Bahramzdeh; Josh Crockett; Ryan Daniel; Ben Heairet (L); Dustin Hobbs; Lance Hoge (L); Kyle Hunter (L); Chad Jasman; Mark Joukoff; Justin Lindsey; Evan Marshall; A. J. Morris; Thomas Rooke (L); Todd Vogel	Catchers: Daniel Dellasega; David Masters; Cameron Welch; Rob Vaughn	Infielders: Drew Biery; Justin Bloxom; Jake Brown; Matt Giller; Randon Henika; Carter Jurica; Jason King	Outfielders: Nick Cocking; Jordan Cruz; Mike Kindel; Nick Martini; Adam Muenster; Jimmy Risi; Dan Rumsey; Dane Yelovich

== Coaches ==
Name	Title	First Season at K-State	Alma mater
Brad Hill	Head Coach	2004	Emporia State (1985)
Andy Sawyers	Hitting Coach	2009	Nebraska (1998)
Sean McCann	Pitching Coach	2004	St. Francis (1993)
Craig Ringe	Volunteer Assistant Coach	2008	Central Missouri (2002)

== Schedule ==
2009 Kansas State Wildcats baseball Game Log
Regular season

#	Date	Opponent	Score	Site/stadium	Win	Loss	Save	Attendance	Overall record	Big 12 Record
1	February 20	at Houston	16–2	Cougar Field	Morris	Musick		1,231	1–0	0–0
2	February 21	at Houston	9–2	Cougar Field	Hoge	Ray		1,165	2–0	0–0
3	February 22	at Houston	2–3 (10)	Cougar Field	Dempsay	Marshall		1,143	2–1	0–0
4	February 26	vs Pacific	7–4	Tony Gwynn Stadium	Morris	Holscher		73	3–1	0–0
5	February 27	vs Nevada	10–2	Tony Gwynn Stadium	Hoge	Bautista		71	4–1	0–0
6	February 28	vs #11 San Diego	1–2	Tony Gwynn Stadium	DeNault	Applegate		117	4–2	0–0
7	March 1	at San Diego State	5–4 (10)	Tony Gwynn Stadium	Applegate	Skipper		419	5–2	0–0
8	March 3	Creighton	12–1	Tointon Family Stadium	Morris	Dufek		730	6–2	0–0
9	March 6	Niagara	12–1	Tointon Family Stadium	Hoge	Kellar		1,252	7–2	0–0
10	March 6	Niagara	9–8	Tointon Family Stadium	Daniel	Morari		1,252	8–2	0–0
11	March 7	Niagara	12–2	Tointon Family Stadium	Bahramzadeh	Candelmo		916	9–2	0–0
12	March 8	Niagara	15–1	Tointon Family Stadium	Vogel	Sikorski		397	10–2	0–0
13	March 10	at #4 Arizona State	6–2	Surprise Stadium	Morris	Leake	Allen	4,375	11–2	0–0
14	March 11	at #4 Arizona State	1–12	Surprise Stadium	Spence	Hoge	Swagerty	5,770	11–3	0–0
15	March 13	Butler	8–4	Tointon Family Stadium	Rooke	Sokolowski		514	12–3	0–0
16	March 14	Butler	14–2	Tointon Family Stadium	Bahramzadeh	Wagoner		888	13–3	0–0
17	March 14	Butler	15–3	Tointon Family Stadium	Vogel	Ochs		888	14–3	0–0
18	March 15	Butler	13–2	Tointon Family Stadium	Morris	Sinkiewicz		661	15–3	0–0
19	March 17	Texas San Antonio	5–4	Tointon Family Stadium	Applegate	Selsor	Allen	1,074	16–3	0–0
20	March 18	Texas San Antonio	5–4	Tointon Family Stadium	Allen	Clarke		685	17–3	0–0
21	March 20	#13 Oklahoma	9–1	Tointon Family Stadium	Morris	Doyle		818	18–3	1–0
22	March 21	#13 Oklahoma	11–12	Tointon Family Stadium	Seng	Marshall		1,499	18–4	1–1
23	March 22	#13 Oklahoma	4–29	Tointon Family Stadium	Rocha	Bahramzadeh		1,101	18–5	1–2
24	March 24	Northwestern	4–3	Tointon Family Stadium	Rooke	Jensen		672	19–5	1–2
25	March 25	Northwestern	12–8	Tointon Family Stadium	Hobbs	Morgan		534	20–5	1–2
26	March 27	at #8 Baylor	7–1	Baylor Ballpark	Morris	Volz		2,642	21–5	2–2
27	March 28	at #8 Baylor	2–3	Baylor Ballpark	Verrett	Hoge	Miller	2,687	21–6	2–3
28	March 29	at #8 Baylor	6–7	Baylor Ballpark	Kempf	Hunter	Pinckard	2,657	21–7	2–4
29	April 1	at Creighton	1–5	Creighton Sports Complex	Nihsen	Daniel		633	21–8	2–4
30	April 3	at Nebraska	15–1	Haymarket Park	Hoge	Roualdes			22–8	3–4
31	April 3	at Nebraska	9–3	Haymarket Park	Morris	Rose		4,634	23–8	4–4
32	April 4	at Nebraska	5–3	Haymarket Park	Vogel	Hauptmann	Allen	1,594	24–8	5–4
33	April 9	#15 Texas A&M	2–4	Tointon Family Stadium	Raley	Allen		713	24–9	5–5
34	April 10	#15 Texas A&M	6–4	Tointon Family Stadium	Morris	Wilson	Rooke	1,247	25–9	6–5
35	April 11	#15 Texas A&M	4–3	Tointon Family Stadium	Rooke	Fleece		1,746	26–9	7–5
36	April 14	Wichita State	13–5	Tointon Family Stadium	Marshall	Maldonado		2,416	27–9	7–5
37	April 15	at Wichita State	4–3	Eck Stadium	Daniel	Flynn	Rooke	5,586	28–9	7–5
38	April 17	Missouri	3–4	Tointon Family Stadium	Gibson	Rooke		3,008	28–10	7–6
39	April 18	Missouri	6–11	Tointon Family Stadium	Fick	Hunter		1,955	28–11	7–7
40	April 19	Missouri	11–5	Tointon Family Stadium	Marshall	Tepesch	Rooke	1,440	29–11	8–7
41	April 24	at #2 Texas	4–2	UFCU Disch-Falk Field	Morris	Wood		5,473	30–11	9–7
42	April 25	at #2 Texas	5–4 (12)	UFCU Disch-Falk Field	Applegate	Jungmann		6,344	31–11	10–7
43	April 26	at #2 Texas	6–6	UFCU Disch-Falk Field				5,552	31–11–1	10–7–1
44	April 28	North Dakota	10–2	Tointon Family Stadium	Hunter	Biermaier		1,149	32–11–1	10–7–1
45	April 29	North Dakota	22–1	Tointon Family Stadium	Daniel	Baumgartner		988	33–11–1	10–7–1
46	May 1	at #26 Oklahoma State	5–3	Allie P. Reynolds Stadium	Hoge	Oliver	Rooke		34–11–1	11–7–1
47	1 May	at #26 Oklahoma State	4–3 (6)	Allie P. Reynolds Stadium	Morris	Lyons		276	35–11–1	12–7–1
48	May 4	BYU	9–8 (10)	Tointon Family Stadium	Rooke	Muir		1,197	36–11–1	12–7–1
49	May 5	BYU	11–3	Tointon Family Stadium	Daniel	Toole		1,640	37–11–1	12–7–1
50	May 8	Texas Tech	0–6	Tointon Family Stadium	Karns	Morris		3,651	37–12–1	12–8–1
51	May 9	Texas Tech	6–12	Tointon Family Stadium	Ramos	Hoge		2,577	37–13–1	12–9–1
52	May 10	Texas Tech	9–5	Tointon Family Stadium	Vogel	Head		1,263	38–13–1	13–9–1
53	May 15	Kansas	4–1	Tointon Family Stadium	Morris	Hall		4,280	39–13–1	14–9–1
54	May 16	at Kansas	3–9	Hoglund Ballpark	Walz	Hoge		2,438	39–14–1	14–10–1
55	May 17	at Kansas	7–17 (7)	Hoglund Ballpark	Ridenhour	Vogel		2,639	39–15–1	14–11–1

Big 12 Tournament

#	Date	Opponent	Score	Site/stadium	Win	Loss	Save	Attendance	Overall record	Big 12 T Record
1	May 20	#24 Kansas	5–4	Bricktown Ballpark	Allen	Selik		4,129	40–15–1	1–0
2	May 21	Baylor	9–4	Bricktown Ballpark	Morris	Kempf		4,583	41–15–1	2–0
3	May 23	#5 Texas	2–4	Bricktown Ballpark	Jungmann	Applegate		5,720	41–16–1	2–1

NCAA tournament: Regionals

#	Date	Opponent	Score	Site/stadium	Win	Loss	Save	Attendance	Overall record	NCAAT Record
1	May 29	Xavier	16–8	Reckling Park	Hoge	Richard		2,893	42–16–1	1–0
2	May 30	#6 Rice	7–6	Reckling Park	Morris	Berry		4,169	43–16–1	2–0
3	May 31	#6 Rice	0–8	Reckling Park	Wall	Vogel		3,298	43–17–1	2–1
4	June 1	#6 Rice	4–13	Reckling Park	Reckling	Rooke		4,589	43–18–1	2–2

== Awards and honors ==
Player	Award/Honor
A.J. Morris	Big 12 Pitcher of the Year
Brad Hill	Big 12 Coach of the Year
A.J. Morris	First Team All-American

== Wildcats in the 2009 MLB draft ==
The following members of the 2009 Kansas State Wildcats baseball team were drafted in the 2009 MLB draft.

Player	Position	Round	Overall	MLB Team
A.J. Morris	Pitcher	4th	112	Washington Nationals
Justin Bloxom	Left Field	11th	322	Washington Nationals
Drew Biery	Third Base	22nd	657	San Francisco Giants
Gerardo Esquivel*	Pitcher	24th	740	Chicago Cubs
Rob Vaughn	Catcher	30th	913	Chicago White Sox
Lance Hoge	Pitcher	36th	1,094	New York Mets

*2009 Signee

== See also ==
- Kansas State University
- Kansas State Wildcats
- Kansas State Wildcats baseball
- Tointon Family Stadium
- Brad Hill
