= Cam Jones =

American football player (born 1999)

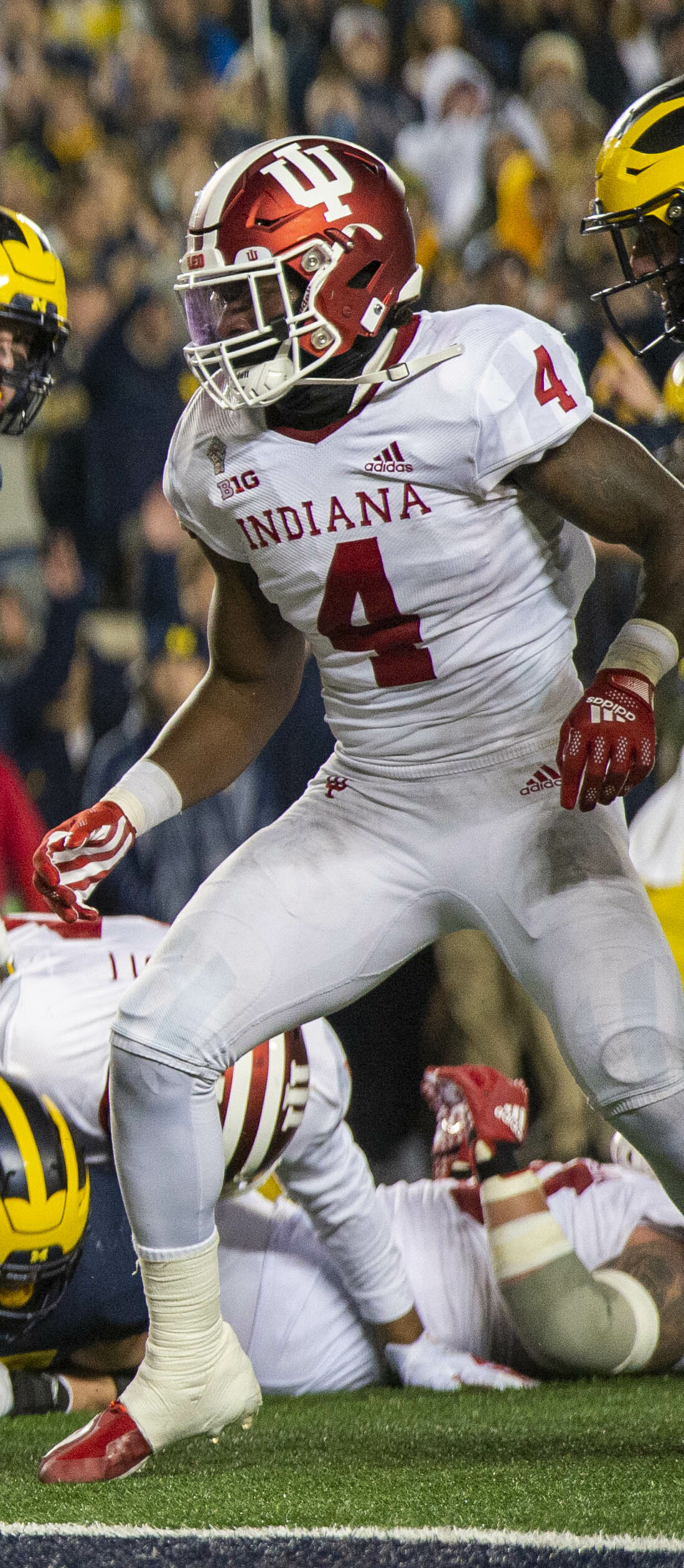
- Jones with Indiana in 2021

Profile
- Position: Linebacker

Personal information
- Born: October 21, 1999 (age 27); Memphis, Tennessee, U.S.
- Listed height: 6 ft 2 in (1.88 m)
- Listed weight: 227 lb (103 kg)

Career information
- High school: St. Benedict at Auburndale (Cordova, Tennessee)
- College: Indiana (2018–2022)
- NFL draft: 2023: undrafted

Career history
- Kansas City Chiefs (2023–2024); New York Jets (2025); New York Giants (2026)*; Kansas City Chiefs (2026)
- * Offseason or practice squad member only

Awards and highlights
- Super Bowl champion (LVIII)

Career NFL statistics as of 2025
- Total tackles: 36
- Stats at Pro Football Reference

Cam Jones (born October 21, 1999) is an American professional football linebacker. He played college football for the Indiana Hoosiers. He previously played for the Kansas City Chiefs, New York Jets, and New York Giants of the National Football League.

== Early life ==
Jones attended Saint Benedict at Auburndale High School in Cordova, Tennessee. During his final two seasons of his high school career, Jones recorded 3,678 total all-purpose yards and 32 touchdowns. A three-star recruit, Jones committed to play college football at Indiana University.

== College career ==
As a freshman during the 2018 season, Jones appeared in 11 games, totaling 20 tackles, two forced fumbles, and an interception. The following year, Jones tallied 35 tackles, two sacks, and one forced fumble. During a game against UConn, Jones returned an interception 44 yards for his first career defensive touchdown. In his junior season, Jones was named an All-Big 10 honorable mention after posting 35 tackles. In 2021, Jones had a career-year, recording 65 tackles, one sack, and one forced fumble. At the season's end, he announced he would return to Indiana using the extra year of eligibility given by the NCAA because of the shortened 2020 season due to the COVID-19 pandemic. In the first game of his fifth season, Jones would tally a team-high 12 tackles, despite being injured. During a game against Nebraska, Jones would go down with an injury and would not return, prematurely ending his season and college career. Jones finished his final season with a total of 54 tackles.

== Professional career ==
Pre-draft measurables
| Height | Weight | Arm length | Hand span | Wingspan | 40-yard dash | 10-yard split | 20-yard split | 20-yard shuttle | Three-cone drill | Vertical jump | Bench press |
|---|---|---|---|---|---|---|---|---|---|---|---|
| 6 ft 1 1/4 in (1.86 m) | 226 lb (103 kg) | 31 1/4 in (0.79 m) | 9 1/2 in (0.24 m) | 6 ft 5 1/8 in (1.96 m) | 4.61 s | 1.63 s | 2.65 s | 4.40 s | 7.30 s | 33.0 in (0.84 m) | 17 reps |
All values from NFL Combine/Pro Day

=== Kansas City Chiefs ===
Jones signed with the Kansas City Chiefs as an undrafted free agent on May 6, 2023. In 2023 he made the Chiefs final roster and played in all 17 games, recording 17 total tackles (14 solo, 3 ast). Jones became a Super Bowl champion when the Chiefs defeated the San Francisco 49ers in Super Bowl LVIII. In 2024 Jones played in all 17 games recording 19 total tackles (12 solo, 7 assisted). On August 26, 2025, Jones was waived by the Chiefs.

=== New York Jets ===
On August 27, 2025, Jones was claimed off waivers by the New York Jets. On October 25, Jones was placed on injured reserve due to a hip injury suffered in Week 6 against the Denver Broncos. He was activated on December 13, ahead of the team's Week 15 matchup against the Jacksonville Jaguars.

=== New York Giants ===
On March 25, 2026, Jones signed a one-year contract with the New York Giants. He was waived by the Giants on July 25.

=== Kansas City Chiefs (second stint) ===
On August 19, 2026, Jones signed with the Kansas City Chiefs. On August 30, he was waived by Kansas City as a part of final roster cuts; he was re-signed to the team's practice squad the next day. On October 13, Jones was signed to the Chiefs active roster. He was waived on October 20.
