= Kansas State Wildcats baseball =

Kansas State Wildcats
- 2026 Kansas State Wildcats baseball team
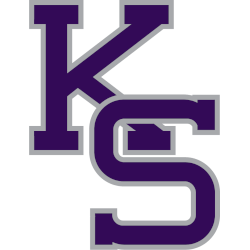
- Founded: 1897 (128 years ago)
- Overall record: 2,007-1,979-10 (.504)
- University: Kansas State University
- Athletic director: Gene Taylor
- Head coach: Pete Hughes (8th season)
- Conference: Big 12
- Location: Manhattan, Kansas
- Home stadium: Frank Myers Field at Tointon Family Stadium (capacity: 2,331)
- Nickname: Wildcats
- Colors: Royal purple and white

NCAA regional champions
- 2013, 2024

NCAA tournament appearances
- 2009, 2010, 2011, 2013, 2024, 2025

Conference regular season champions
- Kansas Collegiate Athletic Conference; 1907, 1908 Big Eight; 1928, 1930, 1933 Big 12; 2013

The Kansas State Wildcats baseball team is a member of the NCAA and the Big 12 Conference. The program's first official game was in 1897.

Following the completion of the 2024 season, Kansas State's all-time record is 2,001–1,974–10 (.503).

== Home field ==
Kansas State plays its home games at Frank Myers Field at Tointon Family Stadium. The stadium was built in 1961, and re-dedicated in 2002 with major improvements including a digital scoreboard, upgraded locker-room facilities, coaches' offices, and more.

The team's first official home field was an open public square in Manhattan located at Bluemont Avenue and 8th Street, which it began using in the 1898 season, called Athletic Field. Construction of Bluemont Elementary School on that plot of land forced Kansas State to move its athletics on campus beginning in 1911. The team's on-campus baseball diamond was initially located at the southwest corner of the campus, at the current location of Memorial Stadium. However, in the following decades the squad played at numerous locations around Manhattan, including City Park and (for many years) Griffith Park, before the opening of the current ballpark.

== History ==
According to most sources, Kansas State began intercollegiate competition with a match against St. Mary's College on May 26, 1894. (St. Mary's was a regional athletics powerhouse, whose recent graduates included baseball pioneers Charles Comiskey and Ted Sullivan.) However, the first game reflected in the school's official history is a 4–3 win over Fort Riley on April 10, 1897. Playing in the old Kansas Intercollegiate Athletic Association, the baseball team earned its first varsity championship in 1907 under coach Mike Ahearn.

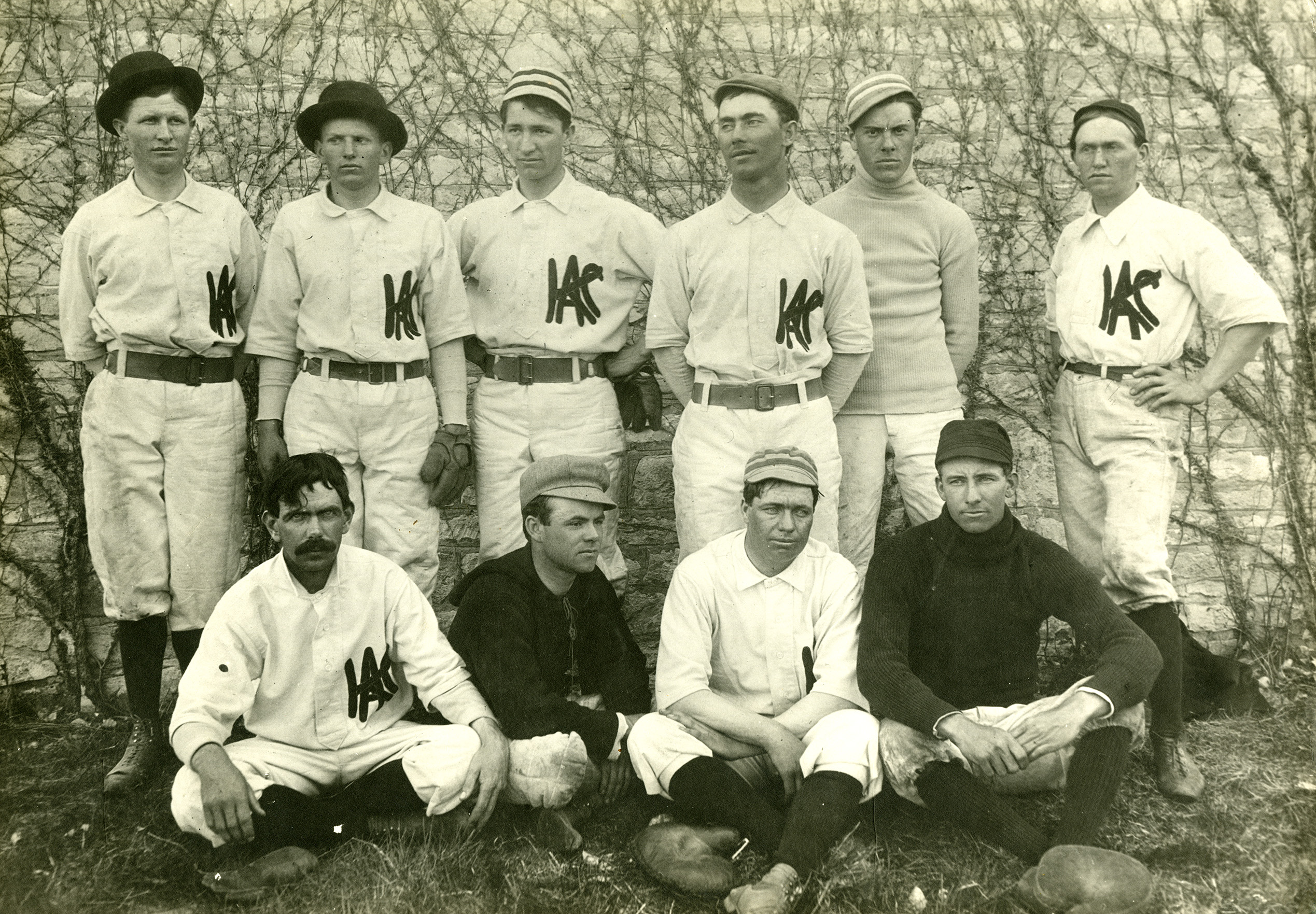
Kansas State baseball team, 1897

After joining the Missouri Valley Conference in 1913, the Kansas State baseball team won major conference titles in 1928, 1930 and 1933. The school's most recent championship was the Big 12 Conference regular season championship in 2013. Kansas State's best finish at the Big 12 Conference baseball tournament was runner-up at the 2008 tournament.

Transcending results on the field, the team established an important milestone when Kansas State catcher Earl Woods, the father of golfer Tiger Woods, became the first African-American baseball player in the Big Seven Conference in 1951.

=== Recent seasons ===
The Wildcats have established a number of firsts for the program in recent years. The team qualified for its first NCAA tournament in 2009, and has returned five times since. Kansas State also earned its first national rankings in the USA Today/ESPN Coach's Poll in 2009, and set a new school record for wins with 43 in 2009, breaking the previous mark of 35 set in 1976.

In 2013, the Wildcats won the Big 12 Conference title and reestablished a new team record for wins. The school also was awarded the right to host the program's first NCAA regional. After winning the Manhattan Regional, Kansas State advanced to its first ever NCAA Super Regional. The team played at the Corvallis Super Regional, falling to the host and Pac-12 champion Oregon State Beavers. Kansas State finished ranked in the top 15 of all the major polls, the team's highest final rankings in history.

In 2024, the Wildcats finished 6th in the Big 12 and were awarded a 3-seed in the Fayetteville Regional, where they would handle Louisiana Tech, upset #5 national seed Arkansas 7-6, and then defeat Southeast Missouri State 7-2 to advance to the Super Regionals for the second time in school history. They would fall to #12 national seed Virginia in the Charlottesville Super Regional to end the season at 35-26.

Year	Record	Conference Record	Standing	Notes
2009	43–17–1	14–10–1	4th	Big 12 tournament NCAA tournament
2010	37–22	14–12	3rd	Big 12 tournament NCAA tournament
2011	36–23	12–14	6th	Big 12 tournament NCAA tournament
2012	27–31	7–17	8th	Big 12 tournament
2013	45–19	16–8	1st	Big 12 tournament NCAA tournament
2014	25–30	5–19	9th	
2015	27–30	10–14	6th	Big 12 tournament
2016	26–31	8–16	8th	Big 12 tournament
2017	29–26	8–16	9th	
2018	23–31	5–19	9th	
2019	25–33	8–16	8th	Big 12 tournament
2020	10-7	0-0	–	Season canceled due to COVID-19
2021	34–23	10–14	7th	Big 12 tournament
2022	29-29	8-16	7th	Big 12 tournament
2023	33-22	13-11	5th	Big 12 tournament
2024	35-26	15-15	6th	Big 12 tournament NCAA tournament
2025	32-27	17-13	6th	Big 12 tournament NCAA tournament
2026	30-27	11-19	11th	Big 12 tournament

=== Kansas State in the NCAA tournament ===
The NCAA Division I baseball tournament started in 1947. The Wildcats have played in 6 tournaments and advanced to the Super Regionals in 2013 and 2024.

Year	Record	Pct	Notes
2009	2–2	.500	Houston Regional
2010	1–2	.333	Fayetteville Regional
2011	0–2	.000	Fullerton Regional
2013	4–2	.667	Hosted Manhattan Regional, Corvallis Super Regional
2024	3–2	.600	Fayetteville Regional Champions, Charlottesville Super Regional
2025	1–2	.333	Austin Regional
TOTALS	11–12	.478	

== Individual honors ==
- Craig Wilson played for the U.S. baseball team at the 1992 Olympics.

=== Conference honors ===
- Player of the Year

Craig Wilson – 1992
Nick Martini – 2010
Ross Kivett – 2013

- Pitcher of the Year

A. J. Morris – 2009

- Coach of the Year

Mike Clark – 1990
Brad Hill – 2009, 2013

- Newcomer of the Year

Jake Scudder – 2016
John Reyes - 2007

== Rivalry ==
Kansas State's main rival is the Kansas Jayhawks. The teams play every year in the Sunflower Showdown.

== Former Wildcats in Major League Baseball ==
- As of the 2024 Major League Baseball draft, at least one Wildcat has been drafted every year under the tutelage of current coach Pete Hughes, with the exception of the truncated five-round draft in 2020. In years with a full MLB draft, at least one K-State player has been selected in each season dating back to 2004.
- Through 2024, a total of 105 Wildcats have been selected in the MLB Draft since its inception in 1965, with 11 of those players being selected multiple times.
- Left-hander Jordan Wicks became K-State's first-ever first-round selection in the MLB Draft in 2021, going to the Chicago Cubs at 21st overall. In 2024, Kaelen Culpepper matched Wicks, being selected 21st overall in the first round to the Minnesota Twins.
- As of the 2025 season, 15 former Wildcats have played at least one game in the Major Leagues.

Name	Years at K-State	MLB	Team(s)
Josh Billings	1910	1913–23	Cleveland Naps, St. Louis Browns
Elden Auker	1929–32	1933–42	Detroit Tigers, Boston Red Sox, St. Louis Browns
Butch Nieman	1938–39	1943–45	Boston Braves
Kite Thomas	1947	1952–53	Philadelphia A's, Washington Senators
Bob Randall	1967–69	1976–80	Minnesota Twins
Andy Replogle	1973–75	1978–79	Milwaukee Brewers
Ted Power	1974–76	1981–93	Los Angeles Dodgers, Cincinnati Reds, Kansas City Royals, Detroit Tigers, St. Louis Cardinals, Pittsburgh Pirates, Cleveland Indians, Seattle Mariners
Craig Wilson	1989–92	1998–2000	Chicago White Sox
Carlos Torres	2004	2009–10, 2012–18	Chicago White Sox, Colorado Rockies, New York Mets, Milwaukee Brewers, Washington Nationals, Detroit Tigers
Evan Marshall	2009–11	2014–21	Arizona Diamondbacks, Seattle Mariners, Cleveland Indians, Chicago White Sox
A. J. Morris	2007–09	2016	Cincinnati Reds
Nick Martini	2009–11	2018–present	Oakland Athletics, San Diego Padres, Chicago Cubs, Cincinnati Reds, Colorado Rockies
Will Brennan	2017–19	2022-present	Cleveland Guardians, San Francisco Giants
Jordan Wicks	2019-21	2023-present	Chicago Cubs
Carson Seymour	2020-21	2025-Present	San Francisco Giants]
Kaelen Culpepper	2022-24	2026-Present	Minnesota Twins

== Conference membership history ==
- 1905–1912: Kansas Intercollegiate Athletic Association
- 1913–1927: Missouri Valley Conference
- 1928–1995: Big Eight Conference (known as Big Six 1928–47 and Big Seven 1948–57)
- 1996–present: Big 12 Conference

== See also ==
- List of NCAA Division I baseball programs
