= Brad Cottam =

American football player (born 1984)

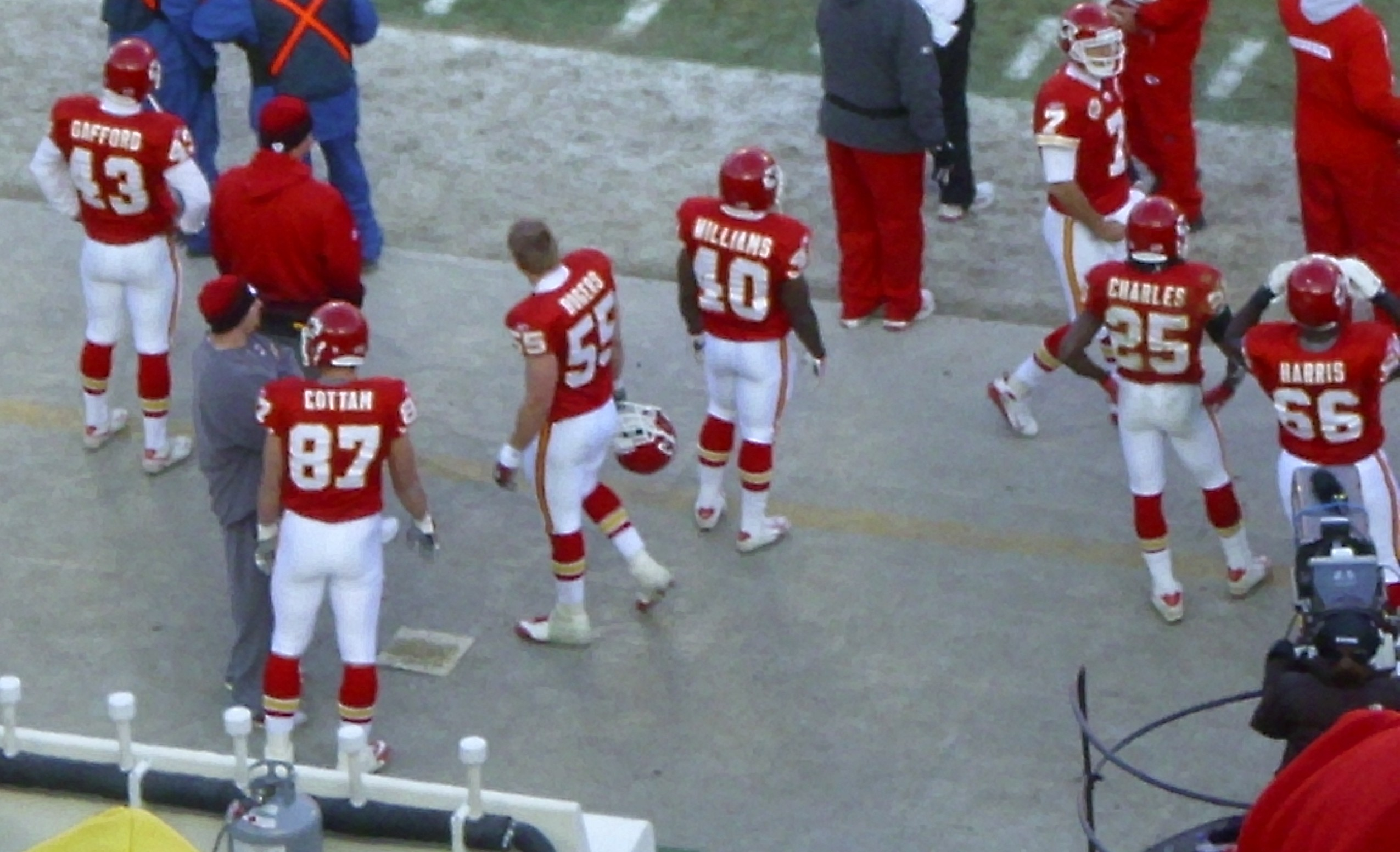
- Cottam (#87) on the sidelines

No. 87
- Position: Tight end

Personal information
- Born: November 28, 1984 (age 41); Germantown, Tennessee, U.S.
- Listed height: 6 ft 8 in (2.03 m)
- Listed weight: 269 lb (122 kg)

Career information
- High school: Evangelical Christian School (Cordova, Tennessee)
- College: Tennessee
- NFL draft: 2008: 3rd round, 76th overall pick

Career history
- Kansas City Chiefs (2008–2010)

Career NFL statistics
- Receptions: 16
- Receiving yards: 183
- Stats at Pro Football Reference

Bradley Joseph Cottam (born November 28, 1984) is an American former professional football player who was a tight end for the Kansas City Chiefs of the National Football League (NFL).

== Early life ==
Cottam played high school football at Evangelical Christian School in Cordova, Tennessee.

== College career ==
Cottam played college football for the Tennessee Volunteers under head coach Phillip Fulmer. He contributed on the field from 2004 to 2007. He caught his first and only collegiate touchdown in his final game. He had a 31-yard reception in the Outback Bowl victory over Wisconsin.

== Professional career ==
Cottam was selected by the Chiefs in the third round, 76th overall, of the 2008 NFL draft. After three injury-filled seasons with the Chiefs, he was released on July 29, 2011. For his NFL career (2008–09), Cottam caught 16 passes for 183 yard (an 11.4 yards-per-catch average) and no touchdowns.

== Personal life ==
His younger brother Jeff Cottam also went to Tennessee and was signed by the Cincinnati Bengals as an undrafted free agent in 2010.
