= Spencer Pulley =

American football player

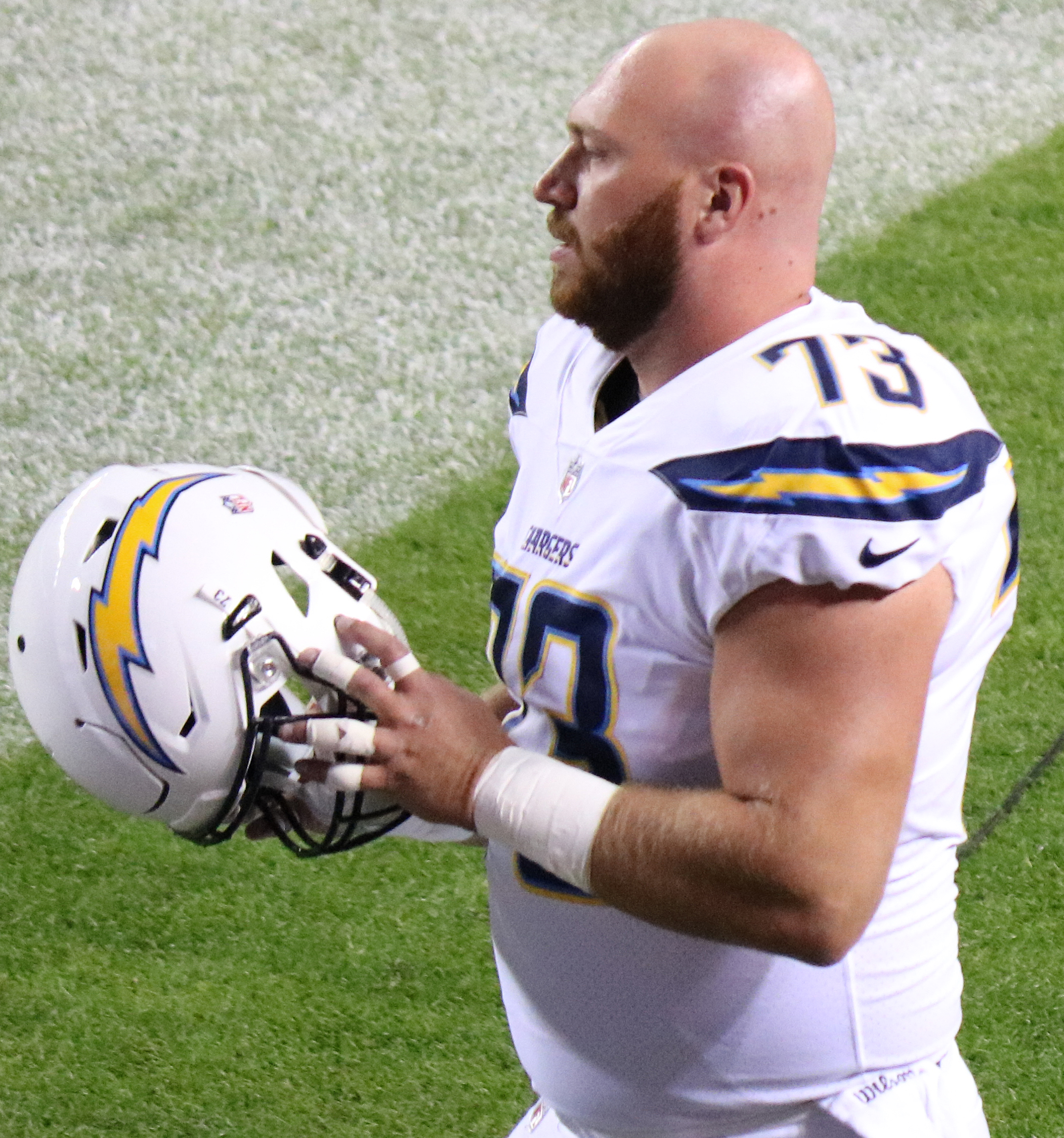
- Pulley with the Los Angeles Chargers in 2017

No. 73, 77
- Position: Center

Personal information
- Born: Memphis, Tennessee, U.S.
- Listed height: 6 ft 4 in (1.93 m)
- Listed weight: 309 lb (140 kg)

Career information
- High school: Evangelical Christian School (Cordova, Tennessee)
- College: Vanderbilt (2011–2015)
- NFL draft: 2016: undrafted

Career history
- San Diego / Los Angeles Chargers (2016–2017); New York Giants (2018–2020); Tennessee Titans (2021)*; Minnesota Vikings (2021)*; Miami Dolphins (2021)*
- * Offseason or practice squad member only

Career NFL statistics
- Games played: 49
- Games started: 26
- Stats at Pro Football Reference

Spencer Pulley is an American former professional football player who was a center in the National Football League (NFL). He played college football for the Vanderbilt Commodores. He was signed by the San Diego Chargers as an undrafted free agent in 2016.

== Early life ==
Pulley attended Evangelical Christian School in Cordova, Tennessee. While there, he was a three-year starter at offensive tackle and defensive end on the football team as well as lettering three times in shot put and discus throw in track & field. As a defensive end he recorded 29 tackles and 11 quarterback sacks. As a senior, he was named a team captain. That year, he helped the teams offense average 37.2 points-per-game. He was awarded the Division II-Class A Mr. Football Award as the state's top lineman as a senior left tackle. He was also named to the writers' first team Division II-A All-State team, The Commercial Appeal's Best of Preps and won the district's offensive line Most Valuable Player (MVP) award. He also played in the Tennessee East-West All-Star Game.

== College career ==
Pulley then attended Vanderbilt University, where he majored in human and organizational development.

As a freshman in 2011, he was one of five true freshman to play during the season. For the season, he appeared in six games on special teams and as a back-up offensive guard. In 2012 as a sophomore, he started four games at center. He helped the Commodores average 170 yards-per-game and 222 passing yards-per-game, before being granted a medical hardship and redshirting the rest of the season. As a junior in 2013, he started all 13 games at right guard. Late in the season he also played some at center. He recorded 46 knockdown blocks and 67 blocks that led to touchdowns or first downs. He helped the offense average 366.7 yards-per-game, 233.7 of which was passing. In 2014 as a senior, he started 12 games at right guard. He earned All-Southeastern Conference (SEC) honors. He recorded 28 pancake blocks on the season. Using a fifth year of eligibility in 2015, he started all 12 games at center, while playing through multiple injuries. He recorded 35 pancake blocks and helped Ralph Webb rush for 1,152 yards, the second highest total in school history. He was named All-SEC for the season.

== Professional career ==
Pre-draft measurables
Height	Weight	Arm length	Hand span	40-yard dash	10-yard split	20-yard split	20-yard shuttle	Three-cone drill	Vertical jump	Broad jump	Bench press
6 ft 4 in (1.93 m)	301 lb (137 kg)	31 1/8 in (0.79 m)	10 in (0.25 m)	5.10 s	1.75 s	2.96 s	4.48 s	7.39 s	28 1/2 in (0.72 m)	9 ft 4 in (2.84 m)	28 reps
All values from Vanderbilt Pro Day

=== San Diego / Los Angeles Chargers ===
Pulley signed with the San Diego Chargers as an undrafted free agent following the 2016 NFL draft.

In 2017, Pulley was named the starting center over the suspended Max Tuerk and Matt Slauson, who was moved to left guard. He started all 16 games at center in 2017 following the release of Tuerk.

On September 1, 2018, Pulley was waived by the Chargers.

=== New York Giants ===
On September 2, 2018, Pulley was claimed off waivers by the New York Giants. Pully started at guard from week 5 and took over center in week 7 after the moving of John Greco to left guard and was the starter in the next nine games.

On March 11, 2019, Pulley signed a three-year, $9.6 million contract extension with the Giants.

=== Tennessee Titans ===
On July 30, 2021, Pulley signed with the Tennessee Titans. He was placed on injured reserve on August 5, 2021. On August 10, 2021, Pulley was released by the Tennessee Titans with an injury settlement.

=== Minnesota Vikings ===
On November 6, 2021, Pulley was signed to the practice squad of the Minnesota Vikings. He was released on November 23, 2021.

=== Miami Dolphins ===
On December 24, 2021, Pulley was signed to the Miami Dolphins practice squad.
