= Jimmy Sexton (sports agent) =

American sports agent (born 1963)

Jimmy Sexton (born August 22, 1963) is Co-Head of Football and Head of Coaching as a sports agent for Creative Artist Agency. He has been with the agency since 2011. Sexton is a 1982 graduate of Memphis's Evangelical Christian School and the University of Tennessee, class of 1986.

He signed his first contract as a sports agent in 1984 with his client, Hall of Famer Reggie White, who was also his college dorm mate. White became the highest paid defensive professional football player at that time. In 1987, Sexton became the youngest agent ever to be licensed by the National Football League Players Association.

Sexton is one of the few agents to represent both players and coaches. He has represented some of the top NFL stars, including Julio Jones, Laremy Tunsil, Derrick Henry, Philip Rivers, Daniel Jones, Eli Manning, Matthew Stafford, J.J. Watt, Ndamukong Suh and Sam Darnold and has negotiated NFL contracts totaling $3 billion in value. As of 2024 he represents 7 of the 10 highest paid college football coaches, 14 of the 16 SEC head coaches and 7 NFL head coaches.

He was listed on the Forbes list of The World's Most Powerful Sports Agents in 2015, 2018, 2019 and 2020.

== Philanthropy ==
Sexton has served on the board of Make-A-Wish Mid-South, Fellowship of Christian Athletes (Memphis), and Hope Christian Community Foundation (Memphis).
