= Evangelical Christian School =

Location
- 7600 Macon Road; Memphis, Tennessee 38018; 35.1529194°N 89.8123787°W

Information
- School type: Private, co-educational, primary and secondary school
- Motto: Pursuit of Excellence for the Glory of God
- Religious affiliation: Non-denominational Christian
- Founded: 1965
- CEEB code: 430453
- Head of school: Scott Hauss
- Campuses: Shelby Farms and Lower School
- Colors: Cardinal , White , & Gold
- Song: "May the Mind of Christ" “Victory In Jesus”
- Mascot: Champ
- Nickname: The Eagles
- Newspaper: The Eagle's Eye
- Yearbook: Ichthus
- Website: ecseagles.com

Evangelical Christian School (ECS) is a private, non-denominational, evangelical Christian school in Memphis and Germantown, Tennessee, United States. It was founded in 1965 and joined Association of Christian Schools International in 1984. It hosts grades pre-K to 12, with grades Pre-K through 5th grade at the Lower School campus in Germantown and grades 6–12 at the Macon campus in Memphis' Cordova section.

== History ==
ECS was established in 1965 as a segregation academy, as part of a wave of private schools formed by white parents in response to desegregation of the public schools. The school began with only primary grades and added one grade each year with the first high school class graduating in 1975.

== Notable alumni ==
- Brad Cottam, professional football player, Kansas City Chiefs
- Morgan Cox, professional football player, Tennessee Titans
- Christopher Daniel Duntsch, aka "Dr. Death", former neurosurgeon, serving life sentence for gross malpractice resulting in the death and maiming of multiple patients
- Drew Holcomb, musician
- Barrett Jones, professional football player
- Kam Jones, basketball player
- Skal Labissière, professional basketball player, Portland Trail Blazers
- Spencer Pulley, professional football player, Los Angeles Chargers
- Brent Rooker, professional baseball player, Oakland Athletics
- Jimmy Sexton, sports agent
- George Sherrill, pitcher, Atlanta Braves, Los Angeles Dodgers
- Garrison Starr, professional musician
