= 2009 Big 12 Conference baseball tournament =

American college baseball tournament

- Teams: 8
- Format: Two four-team round-robin groups
- Finals site: AT&T Bricktown Ballpark; Oklahoma City, Oklahoma
- Champions: Texas (4th title)
- Winning coach: Augie Garrido (4th title)
- MVP: Brandon Loy (Texas)
- Attendance: 72,511

2009 Big 12 Conference baseball standings
	Conf.				Overall
Team	W		L	PCT	W		L	PCT
No. 2 Texas ‍†‍‡‍^{y}	17	–	9	.654	50	–	16	.758
No. 19 Oklahoma ‍‍‍^{y}	17	–	10	.630	43	–	20	.683
Missouri ‍‍‍^{y}	16	–	11	.593	35	–	27	.565
No. 22 Kansas State ‍‍‍^{y}	14	–	11	.560	43	–	18	.705
Kansas ‍‍‍^{y}	15	–	12	.556	39	–	24	.619
Texas A&M ‍‍‍^{y}	14	–	13	.519	37	–	24	.607
Texas Tech ‍‍‍	12	–	15	.444	25	–	32	.439
Baylor ‍‍‍^{y}	10	–	16	.385	30	–	26	.536
No. 27 Oklahoma State ‍‍‍^{y}	9	–	16	.360	34	–	24	.586
Nebraska ‍‍‍	8	–	19	.296	25	–	28	.472
† – Conference champion ‡ – Tournament champion y – Invited to the NCAA tournament As of June 30, 2009; Rankings from Collegiate Baseball

The 2009 Big 12 Conference baseball tournament was held at AT&T Bricktown Ballpark in Oklahoma City, Oklahoma, United States, from May 20 to May 24, 2009. This was the fourth year the conference used the round robin tournament setup. The winners of each group at the end of the round robin faced each other in a one-game match for the championship. The Texas Longhorns defeated the Missouri Tigers, 12–7 to win the championship.

== Regular season standings ==
Place	Seed	Team	Conference					Overall			
Place	Seed	Team	W	L	T	%	GB	W	L	T	%
1	1	Texas	17	9	1	.648	–	50	16	1	.754
2	2	Oklahoma	17	10	0	.630	0.5	43	20	0	.683
3	3	Missouri	16	11	0	.593	1.5	35	27	0	.565
4	4	Kansas State	14	11	1	.558	2.5	43	18	1	.702
5	5	Kansas	15	12	0	.556	2.5	39	24	0	.619
6	6	Texas A&M	14	13	0	.519	3.5	37	24	0	.607
7	7	Texas Tech	12	15	0	.444	5.5	25	32	0	.439
8	8	Baylor	10	16	0	.385	7	30	26	0	.536
9	–	Oklahoma State	9	16	0	.360	7.5	34	24	0	.586
10	–	Nebraska	8	19	0	.296	9.5	25	28	1	.472

- Colorado and Iowa State did not sponsor baseball teams.

== Tournament ==
	Division A	UT	KSU	KU	Bay	Overall
1	Texas		4-2	9-3	9-14	2-1*
4	Kansas State	2-4		5-4	9-4	2-1
5	Kansas	3-9	4-5		4-8	0-3
8	Baylor	14-9	4–9	8-4		2-1

	Division B	OU	Mizzou	A&M	TTU	Overall
2	Oklahoma		4-5	15-17	5-2	1-2
3	Missouri	5-4		5-2	2-4	2-1*
6	Texas A&M	17-15	2-5		11-4	2-1
7	Texas Tech	2-5	4-2	4-11		1-2

Finals
A	Texas	12
B	Missouri	7

- Missouri advances due to tournament tiebreaker.
- Texas advances due to tournament tiebreaker.
- Oklahoma State and Nebraska did not make the tournament.

== All-Tournament Team ==
Position	Player	School
C	J. T. Wise	Oklahoma
1B	Brandon Belt	Texas
2B	Joey Hainsfurther	Baylor
3B	Tony Thompson	Kansas
SS	Brandon Loy	Texas
OF	Ryan Lollis	Missouri
OF	Jamie Johnson	Oklahoma
OF	Kyle Colligan	Texas A&M
DH	Dustin Dickerson	Baylor
SP	Chance Ruffin	Texas
SP	Andrew Doyle	Oklahoma
RP	Craig Fritsch	Baylor
MOP	Brandon Loy	Texas

== See also ==
- College World Series
- 2009 College World Series
- NCAA Division I Baseball Championship
- 2009 NCAA Division I baseball tournament
- Big 12 Conference baseball tournament
