= Kaelen Culpepper =

American baseball player (born 2002)

Minnesota Twins – No. 12
- Shortstop
- Born: December 29, 2002 (age 23); Memphis, Tennessee, U.S.
- Bats: Right Throws: Right

MLB debut
- August 7, 2026, for the Minnesota Twins

MLB statistics (through 2026 season)
- Batting average: .274
- Home runs: 3
- Runs batted in: 11
- Stats at Baseball Reference

Teams
- Minnesota Twins (2026–present)

Kaelen Kenneth Culpepper (born December 29, 2002) is an American professional baseball shortstop for the Minnesota Twins of Major League Baseball (MLB). He was selected by the Twins in the first round of the 2024 MLB draft, and made his MLB debut in 2026.

== Amateur career ==
Culpepper attended Saint Benedict at Auburndale in Cordova, Tennessee. As a senior, he hit .394 with six home runs, 30 runs batted in (RBI) and 13 stolen bases. He committed to Kansas State University to play college baseball.

Prior to his freshman season at Kansas State, he played for the Norwich Sea Unicorns of the Futures Collegiate Baseball League in 2021. As a freshman in 2022, he started 48 of 51 games at third base and hit .283/.356/.428 with five home runs and 22 RBI. After the season he played for the Bluefield Ridge Runners. As a sophomore in 2023, Culpepper started 40 games, hitting .325/.423/.576 with 10 home runs and 41 RBI. After the season, he played for the United States national baseball team and in the Cape Cod Baseball League for the Harwich Mariners.

Culpepper entered his junior season in 2024 as a top prospect for the upcoming Major League Baseball draft. He moved from third base to shortstop. Culpepper played in 61 games and batted .328 with 11 home runs, 59 RBI, and 17 stolen bases.

== Professional career ==
The Minnesota Twins selected Culpepper in the first round, with the 21st overall selection, of the 2024 Major League Baseball draft. On July 30, 2024, Culpepper signed with the Twins on a $3.9 million contract.

Culpepper made his professional debut after signing with the Fort Myers Mighty Mussels and was later promoted to the Cedar Rapids Kernels. Over 26 games between both teams, he hit .242 with three home runs and 12 RBI. He was assigned to Cedar Rapids to open the 2025 season and was promoted to the Wichita Wind Surge in mid-June. Culpepper was also selected to represent the Twins at the 2025 All-Star Futures Game at Truist Park. Culpepper played in 113 games between Fort Myers and Cedar Rapids and hit .289 with 20 home runs, 64 RBI, and 25 stolen bases. The Twins named him their Minor League Player of the Year. He was assigned to the St. Paul Saints to open the 2026 season.

On August 7, 2026, the Twins promoted Culpepper to the major leagues for the first time. That day, he made his debut against the Milwaukee Brewers and hit a home run in his second at–bat, helping the Twins come back and win 8–6.
