= Saint Benedict at Auburndale High School =

Location
- 8250 Varnavas Drive; Cordova, Tennessee 38016; United States; 35°11′7.48″N 89°47′26.37″W

Information
- Type: Private, coeducational, college-preparatory
- Motto: Veritas ∙ Caritas ∙ Libertas
- Religious affiliation: Christianity
- Denomination: Catholicism
- Patron saint: Benedict of Nursia
- Established: 1966
- Oversight: Roman Catholic Diocese of Memphis
- Principal: Ramon Villacura
- Grades: 9–12
- Enrollment: 450
- Colors: Red and Bl ue
- Team name: Eagles
- Accreditation: Southern Association of Colleges and Schools
- Tuition: $15,725 - Traditional Program, $16,800 - PLUS Program
- Website: http://www.sbaeagles.org

St. Benedict at Auburndale High School (SBA) is a diocesan, co-educational, college preparatory school. It teaches grades 9–12 in the Cordova area of Memphis, Tennessee, United States.

The school colors are red and blue, and the mascot is the Eagle. The school is located on a 47-acre campus.

== History ==
The Auburndale School was founded in 1966 by Mary Alice Riggs Smith. The first Auburndale senior class graduated in 1976. On January 14, 1988, Bishop Buechlein announced the Catholic Diocese of Memphis had purchased the Auburndale School due to the continuing decline of the area's only coed Catholic High School, Memphis Catholic High (an inner city High School populated primarily with legacy Catholic families who had since moved to the suburbs) and the developing of the burgeoning area surrounding Highway 64 and Interstate 40. Plans, terms, and even a name, St. Benedict at Auburndale, after the patron saint of Bishop Buechlein's order, were agreed upon. The diocese reached out to The Dominican Sisters of St. Cecilia in Nashville to come to SBA and enlighten it with a solid spiritual and religious presence. As the demand for a quality Catholic high school education grew, SBA received more applications than they could admit. In July 2004, after several years of discussion, fund-raising, and construction, SBA moved next door to the new campus and underwent a transition into a high school-only setting, serving grades 9 through 12.

St. Benedict at Auburndale is accredited by the Southern Association of Colleges and Schools. It is a member of the National Catholic Education Association, an associate member of the Memphis Association of Independent Schools, a member of the National Association of Supervision and Curriculum Development, Learning Disabilities Association, National Association of Secondary School Principals, and Tennessee Secondary School Athletic Association.

== Athletics ==
St. Benedict retains membership in and abides by the constitutions, by-laws and regulations of the Tennessee Secondary School Athletic Association (TSSAA)."

=== Bowling ===
With a multitude of state championships, the SBA bowling team is the winningest in the state. The boys currently have four state champion titles and the girls have seven. In 2017, the Eagles won their second consecutive state championship against Christian Brothers.

== School policies ==
Saint Benedict at Auburndale drug tests every student at least once a year with a hair sample. The following is from the student handbook:

"We are not immune. Our school is not and our students are not. And all that's out there in the world scares us more than we’d like to admit. We at St. Benedict at Auburndale are participating in this drug testing program for one PRIMARY purpose … to provide our students with yet one more reason they can draw upon when faced with choosing for or against drugs. Some are able to make that choice on their own without any fear at all of social pressure or peer ramifications. But some are not. And we hope that this program will ease their decision-making."

== Feeder schools ==
Feeder schools include:

- St. Louis Catholic School
- Holy Rosary Catholic School
- Woodland Presbyterian School
- Our Lady of Perpetual Help Catholic School
- St. Ann Catholic School
- Sacred Heart School
- St. Paul Catholic School
- St. Francis of Assisi Catholic School

== Notable alumni ==
- Kaelen Culpepper – baseball player
- Chris Hardwick - actor, Internet personality
- Cam Jones - linebacker for NFL's New York Jets
- Jonathan Stubbs - U.S. Army lieutenant general and 23rd director of the Army National Guard
- Jordan Wilkins - former running back for NFL's Indianapolis Colts
