= Hope Church (Memphis, Tennessee) =

- Hope Presbyterian Church
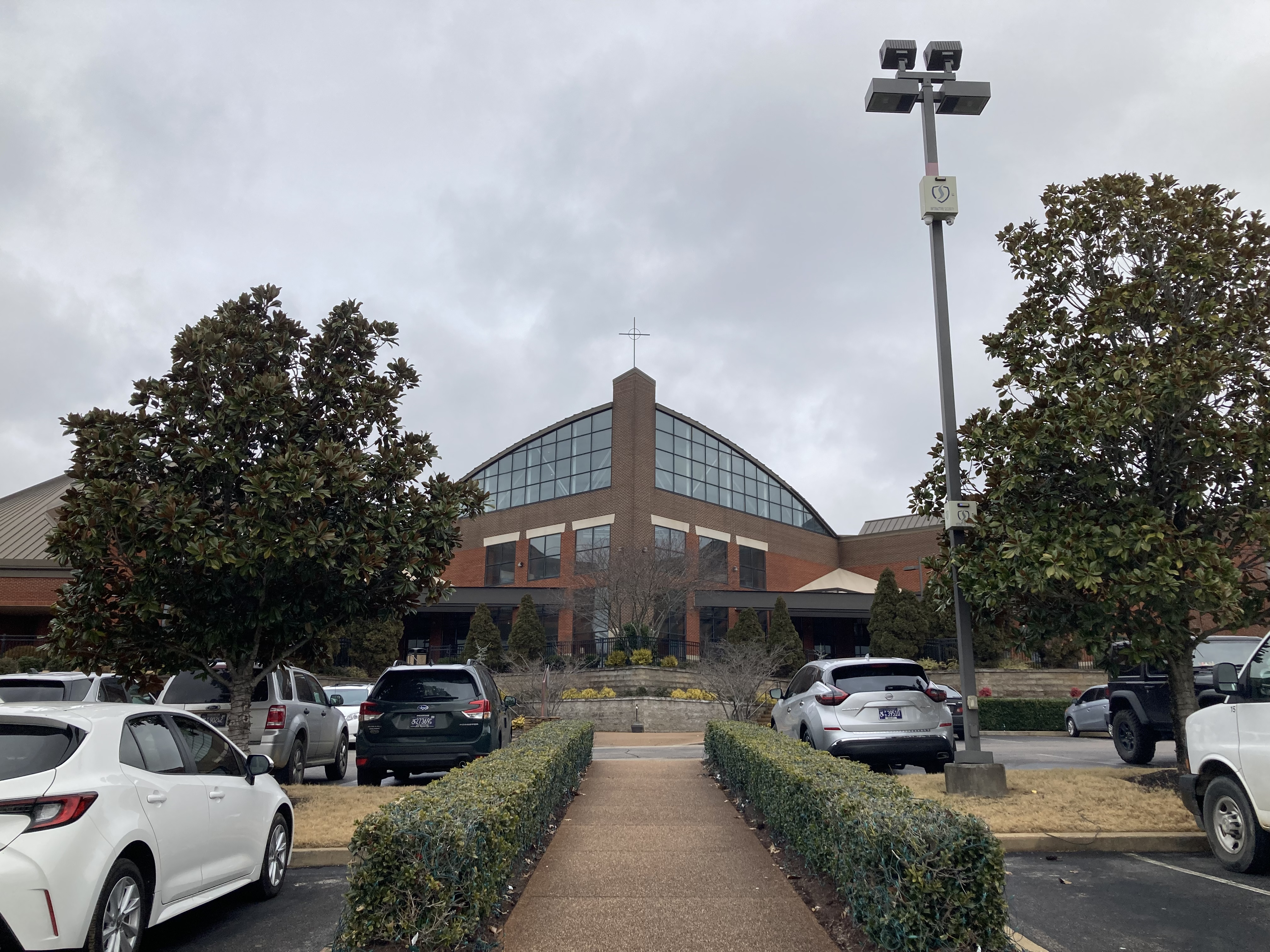
- Hope Church photographed in 2025.
- Hope Church
- 35°7′50″N 89°46′44″W
- Location: Memphis, Tennessee
- Country: United States
- Denomination: Evangelical Presbyterian Church
- Website: http://www.hopechurchmemphis.com/

History
- Founder: The Rev. Craig Strickland

Hope Church is an Evangelical Presbyterian church in Cordova, a district of Memphis, Tennessee, with multiple church plants and outreach programs within the city. Rev. Rufus Smith is the Senior Pastor, Rev. Eli Morris is the former, now retired, Senior Associate Pastor, Pastor Chad Johnson is the Senior Associate Pastor, and Dr. R. Craig Strickland is the Pastor Emeritus. It describes itself as a "church for the unchurched". Hope is a part of the EPC (epc.org) denomination. There have been female placeholders on pastoral staff in the past, keeping in step with the EPC belief of women having the ability to be ordained as a spiritual leader for a mixed crowd of men and women. In a break from EPC teaching (as of the memorandum adopted by the 37th General Assembly, June 2017), as per guidelines of their membership, those who are same-sex attracted are not permitted to be members, as it is non-Biblical in nature, though will fully accept their attendance and volunteering within the church community.

Prior to the Covid-19 pandemic, weekly attendance was over 5,000 across five services. Post-Covid, the in-person attendance over four services per weekend has averaged around 2,300. Online attendance fluctuates. Their Wednesday evening offerings include WOW (Well on Wednesday) and Wednesday evening programming for Middle and High school students. They have a vast array of ministries, including their women's ministry, the men's ministry, the veteran's ministry (men only), children's ministry, special needs ministry, students ministry, and more.

== Theology ==
Hope Presbyterian Church is a member of the Evangelical Presbyterian Church denomination.
