= Wolfchase, Memphis =

Human settlement in Memphis, Tennessee, United States of America

Coordinates: 35.2043°N 89.7933°W

Wolfchase is a neighborhood located adjacent to the Bartlett city limits in northeastern Memphis, Tennessee, United States, and is a part of the Memphis metropolitan area. Its name is derived from its proximity to the Wolf River.

== History ==
The area began to attract development in the late 1980s. It is home to the largest shopping mall in the Memphis region, the Wolfchase Galleria, huge shopping areas, as well as many restaurants, and an Ikea. The area is centered and grew around the important intersections of Germantown Parkway with Interstate 40 and Stage Road (U.S. Route 64). It is situated roughly between the Cordova area and the suburb of Bartlett. Confusing many visitors, a sign off I-40 labels the area as "Uptown Memphis". The area was referred to as "Uptown" before the recent revival of the Greenlaw neighborhood north of Downtown Memphis and its subsequent renaming to Uptown. Wolfchase was the furthest extent of the Memphis city limits at the time of development and was named "Uptown" as it lies on the opposite end of the city as "Downtown".
