= A. J. Morris =

American baseball player (born 1986)

A.J. Morris
- Pitcher
- Born: December 1, 1986 (age 39); Houston, Texas, U.S.
- Batted: Right Threw: Right

MLB debut
- May 24, 2016, for the Cincinnati Reds

Last appearance
- June 15, 2016, for the Cincinnati Reds

MLB statistics
- Win–loss record: 0–0
- Earned run average: 6.30
- Strikeouts: 9
- Stats at Baseball Reference

Teams
- Cincinnati Reds (2016)

Anthony Joseph Morris (born December 1, 1986) is an American former professional baseball pitcher. He played in Major League Baseball (MLB) for the Cincinnati Reds in 2016.

== Career ==
Morris attended Humble High School in Humble, Texas. Undrafted out of high school, Morris attended Kansas State University and played college baseball for the Kansas State Wildcats for three years (2007–2009). He was the 2009 Big 12 Conference Pitcher of the year.

=== Washington Nationals ===
Morris was drafted by the Washington Nationals in the 4th round of the 2009 MLB draft.

Morris played in the Nationals organization in 2009 and 2010, appearing for the Gulf Coast Nationals, Hagerstown Suns, and Potomac Nationals.

=== Chicago Cubs ===
On January 17, 2011, the Washington Nationals traded Morris, Michael Burgess, and Graham Hicks to the Chicago Cubs in exchange for Tom Gorzelanny. Morris missed the 2011 season due to an elbow injury that required surgery. In 2012 he played for the Daytona Cubs, and in 2013 he played for the Tennessee Smokies.

=== Pittsburgh Pirates ===
Morris was selected by the Pittsburgh Pirates in the minor league portion of the 2013 Rule 5 draft. He split the 2014 season between the Gulf Coast League Pirates, Bradenton Marauders, Altoona Curve, and Indianapolis Indians. He spent the 2015 season with Indianapolis.

=== Cincinnati Reds ===
On December 27, 2015, Morris signed a minor league contract with the Cincinnati Reds organization. On May 22, 2016, Morris was selected to the 40-man roster and promoted to the major leagues for the first time. He made his MLB debut on May 24. In 7 appearances for the Reds, Morris struggled to a 6.30 ERA with 9 strikeouts across 10 innings pitched. On June 16, he was placed on the disabled list with a right shoulder strain. Upon being activated from the disabled list on August 31, Morris was removed from the 40–man roster and sent outright to the Triple–A Louisville Bats. He elected free agency following the season on November 7.

Morris played for the Italy national baseball team in the 2017 World Baseball Classic.

== See also ==
- Rule 5 draft results
