= Nick Martini =

American baseball player (born 1990)

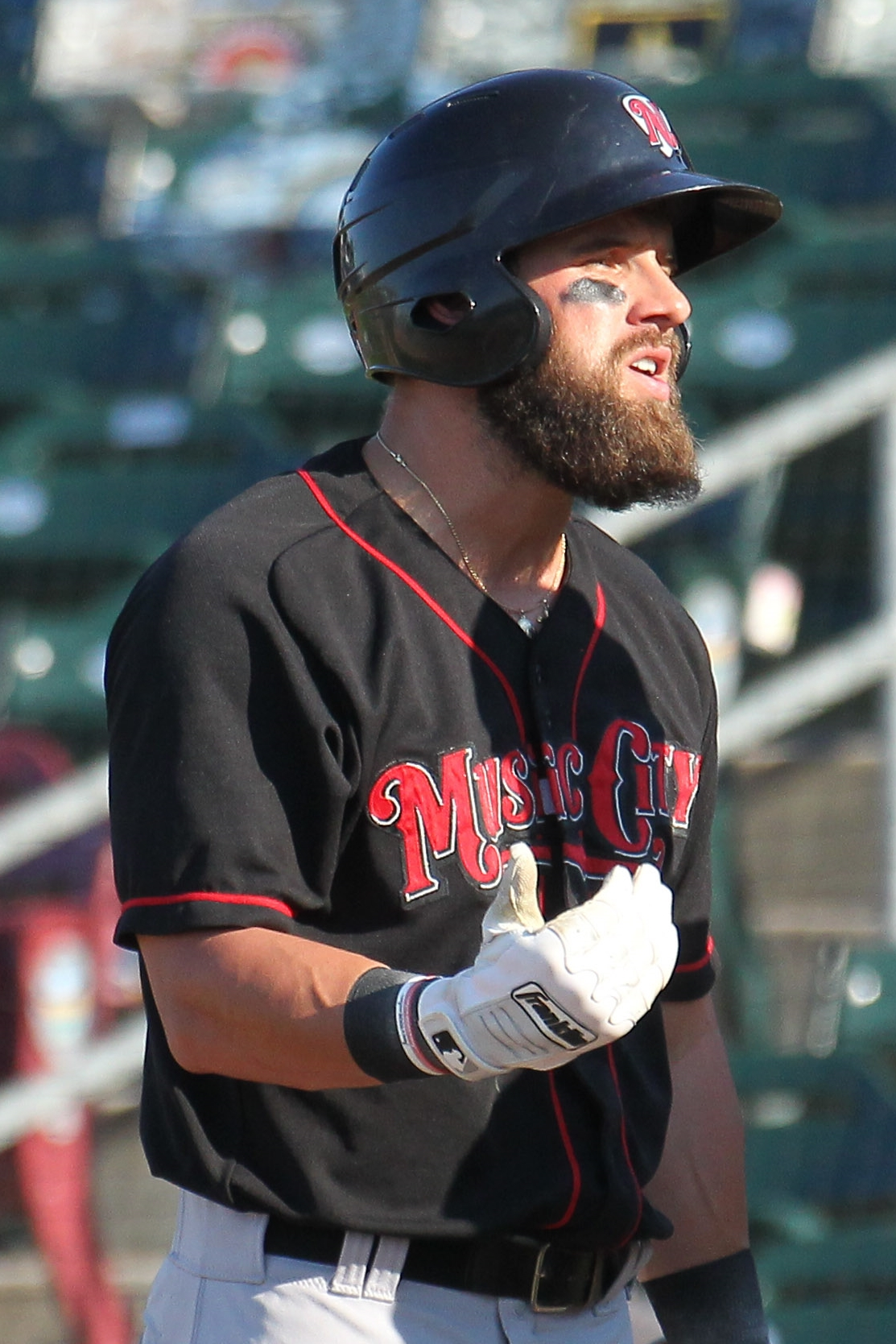
- Martini with the Nashville Sounds in 2018

Free agent
- Outfielder
- Born: June 27, 1990 (age 36); Crystal Lake, Illinois, U.S.
- Bats: Left Throws: Left

Professional debut
- MLB: June 6, 2018, for the Oakland Athletics
- KBO: April 2, 2022, for the NC Dinos

MLB statistics (through 2025 season)
- Batting average: .248
- Home runs: 14
- Runs batted in: 74

KBO statistics (through 2022 season)
- Batting average: .296
- Home runs: 16
- Runs batted in: 85
- Stats at Baseball Reference

Teams
- Oakland Athletics (2018–2019); San Diego Padres (2019); Chicago Cubs (2021); NC Dinos (2022); Cincinnati Reds (2023–2024); Colorado Rockies (2025)

Career highlights and awards
- KBO: KBO All–Star (2022)

Nicholas Scott Martini (born June 27, 1990) is an American professional baseball outfielder who is a free agent. He has previously played in Major League Baseball (MLB) for the Oakland Athletics, San Diego Padres, Chicago Cubs, Cincinnati Reds, and Colorado Rockies, and in the KBO League for the NC Dinos.

== Career ==
=== Amateur career ===
Martini is from Crystal Lake, Illinois, and grew up as a fan of the Chicago Cubs of Major League Baseball (MLB). He graduated from Prairie Ridge High School in Crystal Lake in 2008;

Martini attended Kansas State University where he played college baseball for the Kansas State Wildcats. In 2010, Martini won the Big 12 Conference's Baseball Player of the Year Award, sharing the honor with Aaron Senne. After the 2010 season, he played collegiate summer baseball with the Falmouth Commodores of the Cape Cod Baseball League. Martini safely reached base in 93 consecutive games during the 2009 through 2011 seasons.

=== St. Louis Cardinals ===
The St. Louis Cardinals selected Martini in the seventh round, with the 230th overall selection, of the 2011 MLB draft. He made his professional debut with the Low-A Batavia Muckdogs. In 2012, he played for the Single-A Quad Cities River Bandits, slashing .266/.361/.344 with two home runs and 52 runs batted in (RBIs). The next year, Martini played for the Single-A Peoria Chiefs, batting .252/.339/.329 with two home runs and 36 RBIs. He split the 2014 season between the High-A Palm Beach Cardinals and the Double-A Springfield Cardinals, posting a .260/.337/.385 batting line to go along with career-highs in home runs (7) and RBI (60). In 2015, Martini played for the Triple-A Memphis Redbirds and Springfield, accumulating a .285/.392/.407 batting line with six home runs and 46 RBIs. The next season, he again split the year between Memphis and Springfield, slashing .259/.352/.354 with five home runs and 39 RBIs. He returned to Memphis and Springfield for a third straight split year in 2017, posting a .294/.382/.423 slash line with career-highs in home runs (8) and RBIs (70). After playing for seven years in the Cards’ Minor League Baseball (MiLB) system, he was granted free agency on November 6, 2017.

=== Oakland Athletics ===
On January 10, 2018, Martini signed a minor league contract with the Oakland Athletics organization. He was assigned to the Triple-A Nashville Sounds to begin the season. On June 6, 2018, Martini was selected to the 40-man roster and promoted to the major leagues for the first time. On June 23, Martini notched his first career hit, which drove in the winning run in a 7–6 victory over the Chicago White Sox. On September 20, he hit his first big league home run off Los Angeles Angels catcher Francisco Arcia, who had been summoned to pitch in mop-up duty in a 21–3 blowout victory by the Athletics. Martini finished the season with a slash line of .296/.397/.414.

The Athletics optioned Martini to the Triple-A Las Vegas Aviators before the 2019 season, where he played until he was called up on July 22. He pitched the eighth inning of a July 22, 11–1 loss against the Houston Astros, giving up two walks but no runs, and was returned to Las Vegas the next day. On August 25, Martini was designated for assignment after going 1-for-11 in six major league games.

=== San Diego Padres ===
On August 28, 2019, Martini was claimed off waivers by the San Diego Padres. In 26 games for the Padres, Martini logged a .244/.344/.317 batting line with five RBIs. He was designated for assignment on November 20, 2019.

=== Philadelphia Phillies ===
On November 25, 2019, Martini was claimed off waivers by the Cincinnati Reds. He was designated for assignment by the team on January 8, 2020, following the signing of Shogo Akiyama.

On January 14, 2020, Martini was claimed off waivers by the Philadelphia Phillies. He was designated for assignment on February 15. He was outrighted on February 19 and invited to Spring Training as a non-roster invitee. Martini did not play in a game in 2020 due to the cancellation of the minor league season because of the COVID-19 pandemic. He became a free agent on November 2.

=== Chicago Cubs ===
On January 2, 2021, Martini signed a minor league contract with the Chicago Cubs organization. On May 7, Martini was selected to the active roster after Ian Happ was placed on the injured list. Martini went for 1-for-12 with one RBI in 12 games before being designated for assignment on June 5. Martini was outrighted to the Triple-A Iowa Cubs on June 7. On September 8, Martini was re-selected to the 40-man roster. Martini was again outrighted to the Triple-A Iowa Cubs on October 3. He elected free agency on November 5.

=== NC Dinos ===
On December 21, 2021, Martini signed with the NC Dinos of the KBO League for $550,000 in salary and signing bonus, with an additional $250,000 possible from incentives. Martini played in 139 games for the Dinos in 2022, slashing .296/.365/.461 with 16 home runs, 85 RBIs, and 12 stolen bases. Martini was named an All-Star for the Dinos in 2022 became a free agent after the season.

=== Cincinnati Reds ===
On February 3, 2023, Martini signed a minor league contract with the Cincinnati Reds organization. In 93 games for the Triple–A Louisville Bats, he hit .275/.393/.481 with 15 home runs and 65 RBI. On August 22, the Reds selected Martini's contract, adding him to the major league roster. In 29 games for Cincinnati, he batted .264/.329/.583 with six home runs and 16 RBI.

Martini made the Reds' Opening Day roster in 2024 and hit two home runs on Opening Day. On July 10, 2024, Martini underwent surgery to repair ligament damage in his thumb. He had suffered the injury while sliding into second base in a July 6 loss against the Detroit Tigers. Martini was activated from the 60–day injured list on September 24. In 52 total games for Cincinnati, he slashed .212/.272/.370 with five home runs and 24 RBI. On November 1, Martini was removed from the 40–man roster and sent outright to Louisville.

=== Colorado Rockies ===
On January 15, 2025, Martini signed a minor league contract with the Colorado Rockies. On March 23, the Rockies selected Martini's contract after he made the team's Opening Day roster. In 43 appearances for Colorado, he batted .225/.288/.294 with one home run and four RBI. Martini was designated for assignment by the Rockies on May 30. On June 2, he elected free agency in lieu of an outright assignment to the Triple-A Albuquerque Isotopes.

=== Athletics ===
On June 5, 2025, Martini signed a minor league contract with the Athletics. He made 74 appearances for the Triple-A Las Vegas Aviators, batting .259/.383/.434 with 10 home runs and 44 RBI. Martini elected free agency following the season on November 6.

=== Piratas de Campeche ===
On May 1, 2026, Martini signed with the Piratas de Campeche of the Mexican League. In 19 games for the Piratas, he batted .213/.355/.279 with one home run and four RBI. On May 26, Martini was released by Campeche.

=== Kansas City Monarchs ===
On June 9, 2026, Martini signed with the Kansas City Monarchs of the American Association of Professional Baseball. He made 32 appearances for the Monarchs, batting .279/.384/.492 with six home runs, 24 RBI, and two stolen bases. Martini was released by Kansas City on August 10.
