= Chance Ruffin =

American baseball player (born 1988)

- Pitcher
- Born: September 8, 1988 (age 37); Philadelphia, Pennsylvania, U.S.
- Batted: Right Threw: Right

MLB debut
- July 25, 2011, for the Detroit Tigers

Last MLB appearance
- September 28, 2013, for the Seattle Mariners

MLB statistics
- Win–loss record: 1–2
- Earned run average: 5.60
- Strikeouts: 33
- Stats at Baseball Reference

Teams
- Detroit Tigers (2011); Seattle Mariners (2011, 2013)

Chance Kraig Ruffin (born September 8, 1988) is an American former professional baseball pitcher who played for the Seattle Mariners and Detroit Tigers of Major League Baseball.

== Professional career ==
=== Detroit Tigers ===
Ruffin was drafted by the Detroit Tigers in the first round, with the 48th overall selection, of the 2010 Major League Baseball draft out of the University of Texas at Austin. He made his professional debut in 2011, splitting time between the Double-A Erie SeaWolves and Triple-A Toledo Mud Hens. In 44 appearances between the two affiliates, had a 2.03 ERA with 60 strikeouts and 19 saves.

On July 25, 2011, Ruffin was selected to the 40-man roster and promoted to the major leagues for the first time. In two appearances for Detroit, he allowed two runs on five hits with three strikeouts across 3 2/3 innings of work.

=== Seattle Mariners ===
On August 17, 2011, Ruffin was sent to the Seattle Mariners to complete an earlier trade for Doug Fister and David Pauley. In 13 games down the stretch, he recorded a 3.86 ERA with 15 strikeouts across 14 innings pitched.

Ruffin spent the 2012 campaign on optional assignment with the Triple-A Tacoma Rainiers. In 50 appearances out of the bullpen, he registered a 5.99 ERA with 54 strikeouts across 70 2/3 innings pitched.

In 2013, Ruffin made 31 appearances (18 starts) split between Tacoma and the Double-A Jackson Generals, accumulating a 5–6 record and 3.91 ERA with 82 strikeouts across 112 2/3 innings. He also made nine appearances for Seattle, but struggled to an 8.38 ERA with 15 strikeouts.

Ruffin was designated for assignment on December 18, 2013, after the signing of outfielder Franklin Gutierrez. He was not claimed on waivers, and was outrighted to the Triple-A Tacoma Rainiers. He made 22 appearances for the affiliate in 2014, compiling a 3–3 record and 5.31 ERA with 50 strikeouts across 61 innings. Ruffin announced his retirement from professional baseball on July 4.

== Personal life ==
Ruffin's father Bruce Ruffin played in the major leagues from 1987 to 1997.

== See also ==
- List of second-generation Major League Baseball players
