= Cordova, Tennessee =

- Community
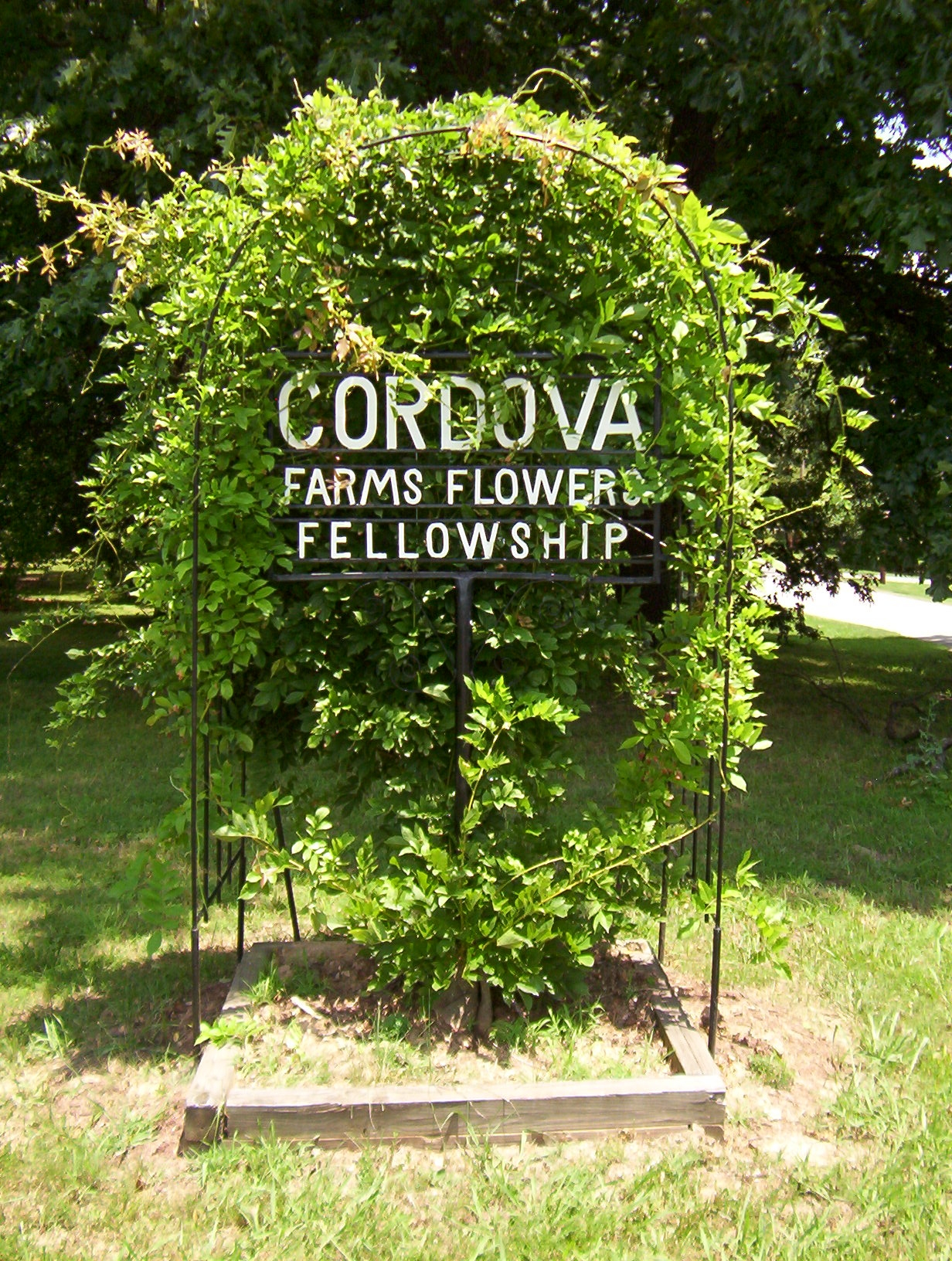
- Cordova Farms Flowers Fellowship sign
- Interactive map of Cordova, Tennessee
- Coordinates: 35°09′20″N 89°46′34″W
- Country: United States
- State: Tennessee
- County: Shelby
- City: Memphis (majority)
- Settled: c. 1835

Area
  - Total: 8.019 sq mi (20.77 km^{2})
- Elevation: 360 ft (110 m)

Population (2020)
  - Total: 68,779
- Census Bureau American Community Survey
- Time zone: UTC-6 (CST)
  - Summer (DST): UTC-5 (CDT)
- ZIP code: 38016, 38018, 38088
- Area code: 901
- FIPS code: 12-38250
- GNIS feature ID: 1281298

Cordova is a community in Shelby County, Tennessee, United States. Cordova lies east of Memphis, north of Germantown, south of Bartlett, and northwest of Collierville at an elevation of 361 feet (110 meters).

The majority of Cordova has been annexed by the City of Memphis. The remainder of Cordova is in unincorporated Shelby County, within the Memphis Annexation Reserve area. The boundaries of the Cordova community are inexact, but are generally regarded as the Wolf River on the south, Whitten Road on the west, Interstate 40 on the north, and Pisgah Road on the east. Parts of Shelby Farms are considered part of Cordova. The Old Cordova Area is centered on Macon and Sanga Road, about three miles east of Germantown Road. It consists of the former town of Cordova, with some original structures still present. The Wolfchase Area is not actually part of Cordova but is often referred to as part of the Cordova area by association; it contains major shopping centers, businesses, and apartments.

== Early history ==
Cordova was a farming village east of Memphis with fewer than a dozen farms when it was founded in 1835. Cordova was renowned for the freshly cut flowers that were shipped to Memphis, Tennessee, thus the town's motto was "Farms, Flowers and Fellowship".

Cordova has changed its name several times since its early settlement. The community was originally known as Allentown, then Marysville, and later Dexter. In 1888, a post office opened under the name Dexter. By 1900, the name of the community had been changed to Cordova, likely to avoid confusion with another town named Dexter located on the same Nashville, Chattanooga and St. Louis Railway line that ran through the area.

== Railroad heritage ==
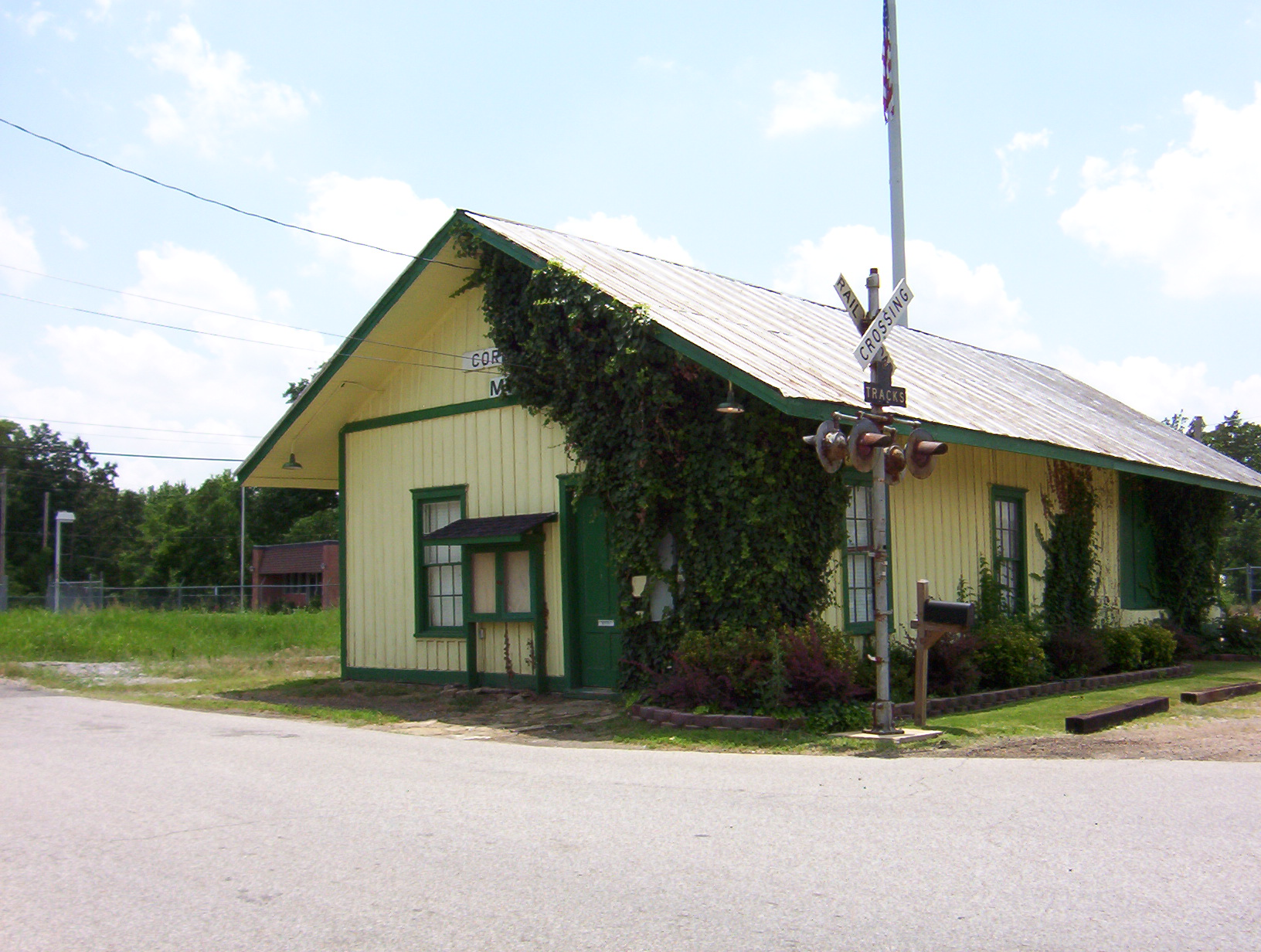
Cordova Train Station

Cordova was one of the many small railroad stops along the Nashville, Chattanooga and St. Louis Railway route to Memphis, Tennessee. The original station which was built in 1889 is still standing. It is located on the corner of Macon Rd. and B St. in downtown. A train named the City of Memphis from Nashville to Memphis stopped at the former Cordova Railroad station (this station is still standing and has been sold to an individual who is renovating it so it can be utilized as a retail business). An important ammunition plant was near Cordova and was served by the railroad during World War II.

Cordova has a railroad line running parallel to the main street (now Macon Road) that was served by P&M (Paducah & Memphis) division of the N. C. & St. L. Railroad (Nashville, Chattanooga & St Louis) that was chartered in Tennessee on December 11, 1845. In March 1957 N.C. & St. L. was taken over by the L & N Railroad (Louisville and Nashville). Because of this, the rail line was considered redundant and the mileage between Cordova and Jackson, Tennessee was abandoned and later scrapped in 1968. The remaining section was therefore made a spur line for the L&N, and later the CSX until 2002, when it was taken out of service. In 2008, this section of railroad was removed. An extension of the Shelby Farms Greenline was completed to the old railroad station in 2016 with future plans to extend it to Houston Levee Road.

== Annexation ==
After a seven-year court challenge to the right of Memphis to annex, portions of Cordova were annexed into the Memphis City Council Second District. These included the subdivisions and land developments of Countrywood (1995), Berryhill (1997), and South Cordova (2001). However, these areas of Cordova were not annexed by Memphis in the years as planned, since they were annexed in the latter years. In response to this, Countrywood was annexed into the city in May 2002, after a failed attempt at annexation in 1995. After several court and legislative challenges, Memphis completed its annexation of the Cordova region with the subdivision of Rockcreek, along US 64 to the Fayette County line.

=== South Cordova and Rocky Point de-annexation ===
In 2012, the South Cordova area was annexed by Memphis, and de-annexed in early 2021. To respond to the de-annexation of South Cordova, Memphis had plans to annex the area in 2001, but decided to put it on hold for unknown reasons. The Rocky Point area, which is part of Cordova, is centered north of Walnut Grove Road between the alignment of Forest Hill and Rocky Point Road. On January 1, 2021, the area was de-annexed by Memphis, and the area returned to unincorporated status.

As of 2025, organized efforts and petitions seeking further de‑annexation of Memphis‑held portions of Cordova are ongoing, with community advocates pursuing potential local governance and municipal status separate from Memphis. These petitions had gathered significant resident support but had not resulted in additional de‑annexation actions yet.

== Today ==
Cordova grew from a quiet country farm hamlet with a population of 150 people in 1912 to one of the fastest growing neighborhoods of Memphis. Retail growth exploded in the late 1990s thanks to the Wolfchase Galleria shopping mall, which at the time was the largest retail center in unincorporated Shelby County outside of the Memphis city limits. Today the majority of the growth is along Houston Levee Road and Macon Road as well as major retail and commercial centers on Germantown Parkway. There are now over 1,226 businesses with over 19,400 employees working in Cordova. As of 2020, Cordova has a population of 68,779.

Cordova continues to preserve its past with a historic downtown which each year celebrates with an annual crafts fair and having its own Fourth of July parade. The community is home of the Hope Presbyterian Church, a megachurch with average weekly attendance of over 7,500. In 2005 the church scaled down plans for a $50 million auditorium with a bell tower that would reach to 180 feet after protests from local homeowners, but opened a smaller facility with 5,000 seats in December 2007.

In 2010, the area's Heartsong Church gained national attention for opening its doors and welcoming the local Muslim population. The worshipers used this space during the month of Ramadan while the Memphis Islamic Center was being built. There were no protests, contrasting with other areas at the time including the proposed Islamic center in New York, and mosque in Murfreesboro, Tennessee.

Cordova is home to a branch of the Memphis Public Library system. The Cordova Branch Library started in one room at the old train depot on Macon Road before moving to the 1913 community center on Sanga Road. In 2004, the branch moved to its own building on Trinity Road.

Bert Ferguson Community Center, located on Trinity Road, is the current site of community athletic fields and rooms, walking trail, banquet hall, and educational development.

== Notable people ==
- Actress and singer Lucy Hale was born in Memphis but grew up in Cordova.
- Golfer John Daly lived here for many years.
- Indianapolis Colts running back Jordan Wilkins was born in Cordova.

== Historic places ==
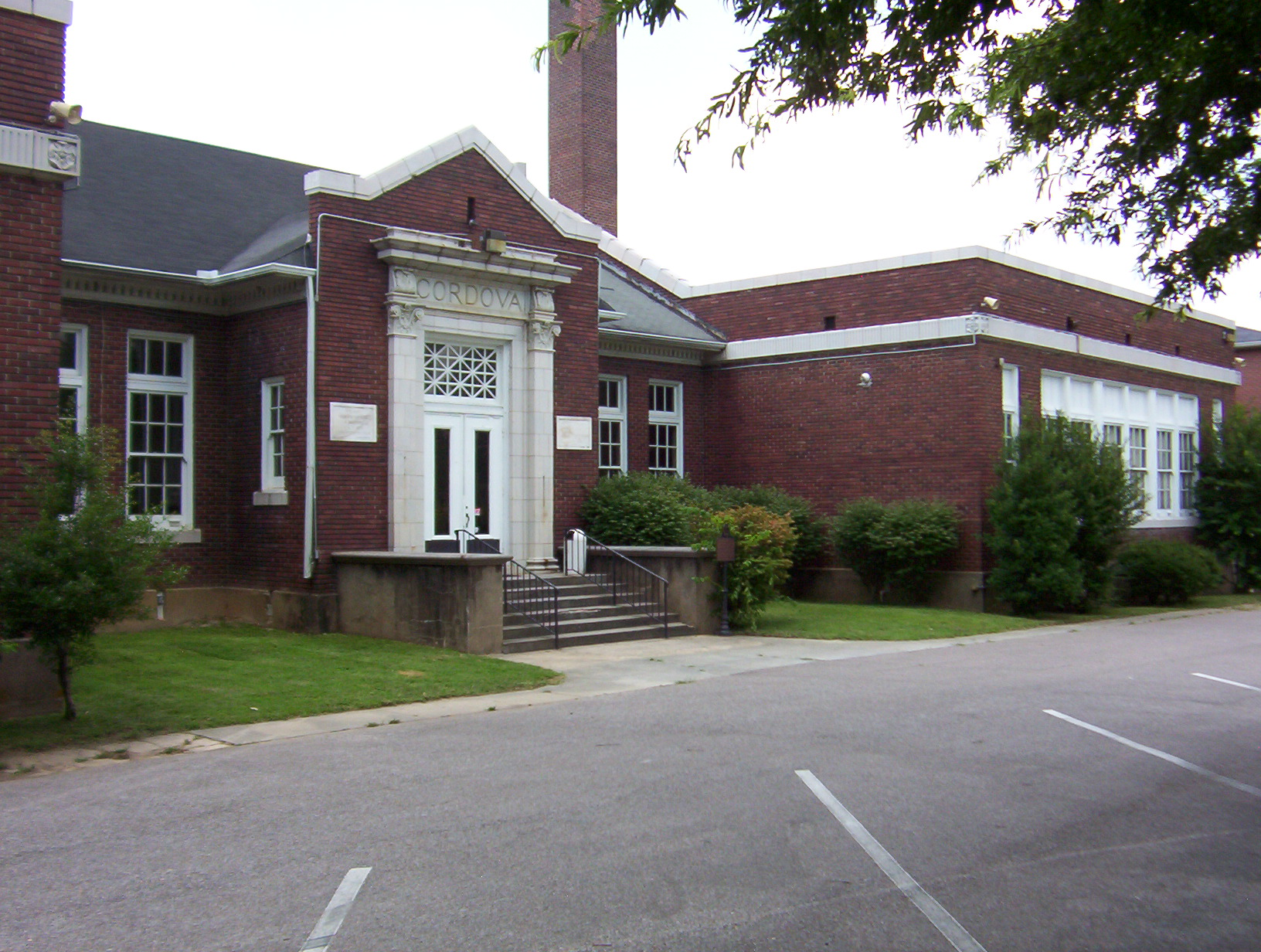
Cordova School, now the Community Center

- Cordova Community Center
  (also known as "Cordova School" or "Cordova Elementary School") is a former school, Shelby county library with meeting rooms, and church. Constructed in 1913 and opening during World War I, it is listed in the National Register of Historic Places. Through fundraising and donations, local citizens purchased the building from the Shelby County Board of Education in October 1985 for $150,000. The building is primarily used to host community events and classes and currently houses the Cordova Museum in a replicate of an old school room. Sports facilities include a gymnasium and ball fields for community athletics. The annual Cordova Festival is held on grounds having last celebrated its 24th anniversary in September 2011.
- Cordova Station
  A one-room train station for the Nashville Chattanooga and St. Louis railroad in downtown Cordova on Macon Road. Later it served as the Cordova Branch Library of the Memphis-Shelby County Library for more than 50 years until the library was moved to its current modern facilities.
- Sangie Cemetery
  Near the corner of Walnut Grove Road (formerly Raleigh-LaGrange Road) and Sanga Road, the cemetery is very old, dating back to the early 19th century. Privately Owned Cemetery.
- Walter Granville Allen House
  The Walter Granville Allen House is an early 20th-century Colonial Revival private residence listed in the National Register of Historic Places.

== Education ==
Cordova is zoned to Memphis-Shelby County Schools. Until the 2013 merger of Memphis City Schools and Shelby County schools, Cordova was divided between the two districts.

Cordova Schools:

- Cordova Elementary School
- Cordova Middle School
- Cordova High School
- Chimneyrock Elementary School
- Dexter Elementary School
- Macon-Hall Elementary School
- Dexter Middle School
- Mount Pisgah Middle School

Portions are zoned to Germantown Middle School and Germantown High School, which are not part of the municipal school system of Germantown.

=== Private schools ===
- Briarcrest Christian School, K-12
- Evangelical Christian School, K-12
- First Assembly Christian School, K-12
- Harding Academy, elementary
- Heritage Baptist Academy
- Lamplighter Montessori School, 18 months - 8th grade
- Bright Stars Christian Academy, Pre-K, K-12
- Lamplighter Montessori School, K-8
- St. Benedict at Auburndale High School, 9-12
- St. Francis Catholic School, elementary
- Shady Oaks School, elementary

=== Higher education ===
- Mid-America Baptist Theological Seminary (MABTS), in Cordova, is accredited by the Commission on Colleges of the Southern Association of Colleges and Schools for associates, bachelors, masters and doctors degrees in Divinity, Christian Education, Missiology, Christian Studies, Pastoral Ministries and Philosophy.

== Demographics ==
Historical population
Census	Pop.	Note	%±
1980	36,126		—
1990	39,544		9.5%
2000	55,875		41.3%
2010	52,264		−6.5%
2017 (est.)	60,762		16.3%

As of the 2010 Census, there were 78,138 people, 31,403 households, and 20,760 families living in the 38018 and 38016 zip codes which comprise Cordova. The area includes 33,515 housing units. The racial makeup of the area was 61.5% White, 29.2% African American, 0.29% Native American, 4.99% Asian, 0.065% Pacific Islander, and 2.48% from other races, and 2.1% from two or more races. Hispanic or Latino of any race were 5.47% of the population.

Of households in the area, 32.66% had children under the age of 18 living with them, 49.18% were married couples living together, 12.7% had a female householder with no husband present, and 33.89% were non-family households. 27.41% of all households were made up of individuals, and 4.95% had someone living alone who was 65 years of age or older. The median age was 34.5 years.

The median household income in zip code 38018 was $67,437 and the median income for a family was $82,319. In zip code 38016, the median household income was $64,190 and the median family income was $80,736. The per capita income was $34,806 in 38018 and $32,590 in 38016. About 5% of families and about 6.9% of the total population were below the poverty line, including about 10% of those under age 18 and about 6% of those age 65 and over.

== Recreation ==
- Colonial Country Club in Cordova is a private golf club which formerly hosted the Memphis Open golf tournament (now known as the Stanford St. Jude Championship). It received national attention for two occurrences during the 1977 event. First, President Gerald Ford hit a hole in one during the event's Pro-Am. Later, professional golfer Al Geiberger shot a record 59.

== See also ==
- Information from the Tennessee State Library & Archives "Tennessee Place Names and Post Offices" http://www.wdbj.net/shelby/locale/postoffice.htm#G
- South-East Memphis / Cordova Community Centers at City of Memphis
- "Cordova Community Center Web Site". Archived from the original on 2012-04-09.
