= Tim Jamieson =

American baseball coach

Current position
- Title: Director Of Program Development
- Team: Missouri Tigers
- Conference: SEC

Playing career
- 1978–1981: New Orleans
- Position: Catcher

Coaching career (HC unless noted)
- 1983–1988: New Orleans (assistant)
- 1989–1994: Missouri (assistant)
- 1995–2016: Missouri
- 2020–2022: Southern Illinois (P)
- 2023: Memphis (P)
- 2024—2025: Missouri (P)
- 2026–Present: Missouri (Director of Program Development)

Head coaching record
- Overall: 698–565–2
- Tournaments: 12–19 (NCAA); 26–22 (Big 12)

Accomplishments and honors

Championships
- 1 Big Eight regular season (1996); 1 Big 12 tournament (2012)

Awards
- Big Eight Coach of the Year (1996); Big 12 Coach of the Year (2007)

Tim Jamieson is an American baseball coach and former catcher, who most recently was the pitching coach for the Missouri Tigers. He played college baseball at New Orleans from 1978 to 1981. He then served as the head coach of the Missouri Tigers (1995–2016). The second winningest coach in school history, Jamieson coached in 3 conferences, and took his teams to 9 NCAA Regionals, winning two conference championships in the process.

== Early life ==
A native of Columbia, Missouri, Jamieson graduated from Rock Bridge High School. Jamieson's father, Dick, played for the New York Titans before serving as the Missouri offensive coordinator under Al Onofrio.

Jamieson went on to attend the University of New Orleans where was a catcher for the New Orleans Privateers baseball team. Jamieson and the Privateers made the NCAA tournament three times and Jamieson was named the team's most valuable player his senior year.

== Coaching career ==
Jamieson's first coaching job was as an assistant coach at his alma mater, the University of New Orleans. While Jamieson was on the staff, the New Orleans Privateers made the NCAA tournament four times in five years and made the 1984 College World Series. In 1988, Jamieson returned to his hometown as an assistant coach for the Missouri Tigers under Gene McArtor.

When McArtor retired following the 1994 season, Jamieson took over as head coach. In 1996, just his second season as head coach, and Missouri's last in the Big Eight Conference, Jamieson led the Tigers to a conference championship and was named Big 8 Coach of the Year.

From 2003 to 2009, Jamieson led Missouri to seven consecutive NCAA tournaments. In the 2006 NCAA Division I baseball tournament, Missouri won the Malibu regional, becoming the first #4 seed ever to win a regional. In 2007, Jamieson won Big 12 Conference Baseball Coach of the Year honors, leading Missouri to 42 wins and earning a #1 seed and a place as a regional host in the 2007 NCAA Division I baseball tournament.

In 2012, Jamieson led Missouri to its first Big 12 Conference baseball tournament championship. Jamieson had previously led Missouri to the Big 12 Conference baseball tournament Championship Game on three occasions, losing to Oklahoma State in 2004, Texas in 2009, and Texas A&M in 2011.

Jamieson has had 58 players selection in the Major League Baseball draft, including three first round draft choices in Max Scherzer, Aaron Crow, and Kyle Gibson. Ten Missouri players have earned All-American honors under Jamieson and 30 players have earned All-Conference honors with Aaron Senne earning Big 12 Conference Baseball Player of the Year honors and Max Scherzer and Aaron Crow earning Big 12 Conference Baseball Pitcher of the Year honors.

After the 2016 season, Jamieson resigned from his position as head coach after 28 years at Missouri.

Jamieson returned to coaching in 2020, becoming pitching coach for Southern Illinois, after working as an analyst for the SEC Network for Missouri baseball games. After three seasons, Jamieson then was hired as pitching coach for Memphis.

In 2023, Jamieson was elected to the University of Missouri Intercollegiate Athletics Hall of Fame. Also in 2023, Jamieson returned to Missouri as pitching coach under Kerrick Jackson. Jackson and Jamieson had previously worked together at Missouri and Memphis. Jamieson resigned from his pitching coach position following the 2025 season.

== Head coaching record ==
Record table
| Season | Team | Overall | Conference | Standing | Postseason |
|---|---|---|---|---|---|
Missouri Tigers (Big Eight Conference) (1995–1996)
| 1995 | Missouri | 19–34 | 7–20 | 7th | |
| 1996 | Missouri | 39–19 | 20–8 | 1st | NCAA Regional |
Missouri Tigers (Big 12 Conference) (1997–2012)
| 1997 | Missouri | 31–27 | 16–14 | 6th | |
| 1998 | Missouri | 36–18 | 17–12 | 5th | |
| 1999 | Missouri | 37–19 | 14–13 | 7th | |
| 2000 | Missouri | 33–24 | 13–14 | 7th | |
| 2001 | Missouri | 31–24–1 | 11–19 | 10th | |
| 2002 | Missouri | 24–29 | 9–16 | 9th | |
| 2003 | Missouri | 36–22 | 15–11 | 4th | NCAA Regional |
| 2004 | Missouri | 38–23–1 | 12–14 | 7th | NCAA Regional |
| 2005 | Missouri | 40–23 | 16–11 | 4th | NCAA Regional |
| 2006 | Missouri | 35–28 | 12–15 | 7th | NCAA Super Regional |
| 2007 | Missouri | 42–18 | 19–8 | 2nd | NCAA Regional |
| 2008 | Missouri | 39–21 | 16–11 | 4th | NCAA Regional |
| 2009 | Missouri | 35–27 | 16–11 | 3rd | NCAA Regional |
| 2010 | Missouri | 29–26 | 10–16 | 8th | |
| 2011 | Missouri | 27–32 | 11–15 | 8th | |
| 2012 | Missouri | 33–28 | 10–14 | 6th | NCAA Regional |
Missouri Tigers (Southeastern Conference) (2013–2016)
| 2013 | Missouri | 18–32 | 10–20 | 5th (East) | |
| 2014 | Missouri | 20–33 | 6–24 | 7th (East) | |
| 2015 | Missouri | 29–28 | 15–15 | 3rd (East) | |
| 2016 | Missouri | 26–30 | 9–20 | T–6th (East) | |
| Missouri: | | 698–565–2 | 284–321 | | |
| Total: | | 698–565–2 | | | |
National champion Postseason invitational champion Conference regular season champion Conference regular season and conference tournament champion Division regular season champion Division regular season and conference tournament champion Conference tournament champion

== See also ==
- List of current NCAA Division I baseball coaches
