= Missouri Tigers baseball =

Missouri Tigers
- 2026 Missouri Tigers baseball team
- Founded: 1891 (134 years ago)
- Overall record: 2,426-1,701-20
- University: University of Missouri
- Athletic director: Laird Veatch
- Head coach: Kerrick Jackson (3rd season)
- Conference: Southeastern
- Location: Columbia, Missouri
- Home stadium: Taylor Stadium (capacity: 3,031)
- Nickname: Tigers
- Colors: Black and gold

College World Series champions
- 1954

College World Series runner-up
- 1952, 1958, 1964

College World Series appearances
- 1952, 1954, 1958, 1962, 1963, 1964

NCAA regional champions
- 2006

NCAA tournament appearances
- 1952, 1954, 1958, 1962, 1963, 1964, 1965, 1976, 1978, 1980, 1981, 1988, 1991, 1996, 2003, 2004, 2005, 2006, 2007, 2008, 2009, 2012

Conference tournament champions
- 1976, 1980, 2012

Conference regular season champions
- 1917, 1931, 1932, 1937, 1938, 1941, 1942, 1952, 1954, 1958, 1962, 1963, 1964, 1976, 1981, 1996

The Missouri Tigers baseball team represents the University of Missouri in NCAA Division I college baseball. The Missouri Tigers have an all-time record of 2426-1701-20 following the 2025 season.

== Head coaches ==
Name	Years	Won	Lost	Tied	Pct.
A. M. Ebright	1906–1908	34	23	2	.576
Guy Lowman	1909–1910	20	11	1	.625
Chester Brewer	1911, 1914–1917, 1933–1934	61	32	3	.635
Osmond F. Field	1912–1913	20	12	2	.588
John F. Miller	1918–1921	30	16	1	.638
Jerry Jones	1922	9	5	0	.643
Hank Garrity	1923–1924	15	22	0	.405
Harry Kipke	1925	9	8	0	.529
Jack Crangle	1926–1932	54	55	0	.495
Anton Stankowski	1935–1936	16	17	0	.485
John 'Hi' Simmons	1937–1973	481	294	3	.618
Gene McArtor	1974–1994	733	430	3	.629
Tim Jamieson	1995–2016	652	504	2	.566
Steve Bieser	2017–2023	188	155	1	.548
Kerrick Jackson	2024–Present	39	71	0	.355

== Year-by-year record ==
Season	Coach	Overall Record	Conference Record	Notes
1891	Unknown	2–2	—	
1892	Unknown	1–2	—	
1893	Unknown	2–1	—	
1894	Unknown	Unknown	—	
1895	Unknown	Unknown	—	
1896	Unknown	2–3	—	
1897	Unknown	8–2–1	—	
1898	Unknown	6–3–1	—	
1899	Unknown	Unknown	—	
1900	Unknown	Unknown	—	
1901	Unknown	3–9	—	
1902	Unknown	6–6	—	
1903	Unknown	7–5	—	
1904	Unknown	10–8	—	
1905	Unknown	18–5	—	
1906	A. M. Ebright	18–1–1	—	
1907	A. M. Ebright	9–12	—	
1908	A. M. Ebright	7–10–1	—	
1909	Guy Lowman	9–6–1	—	
1910	Guy Lowman	11–5	—	
1911	Chester Brewer	8–3	—	
1912	Osmond F. Field	11–7–1	—	
1913	Osmond F. Field	9–5–1	—	
1914	Chester Brewer	7–7–3	—	
1915	Chester Brewer	10–5	—	
1916	Chester Brewer	16–2	—	
1917	Chester Brewer	16–1	—	Missouri Valley Champions
1918	John F. Miller	11–3	—	
1919	No team due to World War I			
1920	John F. Miller	8–8	—	
1921	John F. Miller	11–5–1	—	
1922	Jerry Jones	9–5	—	
1923	Hank Garrity	8–10	—	
1924	Hank Garrity	7–12	—	
1925	Harry Kipke	9–8	—	
1926	Jack Crangle	5–8	—	
1927	Jack Crangle	7–8	—	
1928	Jack Crangle	7–11	—	
Big Six Conference
1929	Jack Crangle	8–9	8–5	
1930	Jack Crangle	7–11	7–7	
1931	Jack Crangle	10–2	6–1	Big Six Champions
1932	Jack Crangle	10–6	6–3	Big Six Champions
1933	Chester Brewer	5–6	3–3	
1934	Chester Brewer	7–11	—	
1935	Anton Stankowski	7–10	3–8	
1936	Anton Stankowski	9–7	3–5	
1937	John 'Hi' Simmons	13–2–1	8–2	Big Six Champions
1938	John 'Hi' Simmons	11–2	8–2	Big Six Champions
1939	John 'Hi' Simmons	11–3	10–2	
1940	John 'Hi' Simmons	8–4	6–4	
1941	John 'Hi' Simmons	15–2	10–2	Big Six Champions
1942	John 'Hi' Simmons	12–3	7–1	Big Six Champions
1943	John 'Hi' Simmons	3–3	—	
1944	No team Due To World War II			
1945	No team Due To World War II			
1946	John 'Hi' Simmons	5–7	4–4	
Big Seven Conference
1947	John 'Hi' Simmons	11–8	9–6	
1948	John 'Hi' Simmons	15–6	11–5	
1949	John 'Hi' Simmons	7–11	5–7	
1950	John 'Hi' Simmons	11–9–1	9–5	
1951	John 'Hi' Simmons	12–6	9–4	
1952	John 'Hi' Simmons	20–7	13–1	Big Seven Champions, College World Series Runner Up
1953	John 'Hi' Simmons	11–8	9–5	
1954	John 'Hi' Simmons	22–4	11–1	Big Seven Champions, College World Series Champions
1955	John 'Hi' Simmons	14–6	9–3	
1956	John 'Hi' Simmons	14–7	7–6	
1957	John 'Hi' Simmons	13–7	10–7	
Big Eight Conference
1958	John 'Hi' Simmons	22–7	12–3	Big Eight Champions, College World Series Runner Up
1959	John 'Hi' Simmons	3–17	3–11	
1960	John 'Hi' Simmons	12–9	9–6	
1961	John 'Hi' Simmons	16–7	13–6	
1962	John 'Hi' Simmons	22–7	16–5	Big Eight Champions, College World Series 7th Place
1963	John 'Hi' Simmons	25–8	17–3	Big Eight Champions, College World Series 4th Place, No. 3 Final CB Poll
1964	John 'Hi' Simmons	26–5–1	19–0	Big Eight Champions, College World Series Runner Up, No. 2 Final CB Poll
1965	John 'Hi' Simmons	15–8	13–5	NCAA Regional, No. 18 Final CB Poll
1966	John 'Hi' Simmons	13–12	9–9	
1967	John 'Hi' Simmons	15–14–1	12–9	
1968	John 'Hi' Simmons	11–6	9–11	
1969	John 'Hi' Simmons	14–13	11–10	
1970	John 'Hi' Simmons	12–13	8–9	
1971	John 'Hi' Simmons	17–16	12–9	
1972	John 'Hi' Simmons	16–16	9–11	
1973	John 'Hi' Simmons	13–21	8–12	
1974	Gene McArtor	28–14	12–9	
1975	Gene McArtor	17–20	8–10	
1976	Gene McArtor	46–22	4–1	Big Eight Tournament champions, NCAA Regional, No. 30 Final CB Poll
1977	Gene McArtor	36–15	9–1	
1978	Gene McArtor	35–18	7–3	NCAA Regional
1979	Gene McArtor	45–12	16–4	
1980	Gene McArtor	45–15–1	15–5	Big Eight Tournament champions, NCAA Regional, No. 13 Final CB Poll
1981	Gene McArtor	43–18	17–6	Big Eight Champions, NCAA Regional, No. 16 Final BA Poll
1982	Gene McArtor	39–17	12–9	
1983	Gene McArtor	25–16	7–8	
1984	Gene McArtor	27–20–1	7–8	
1985	Gene McArtor	36–27	7–17	
1986	Gene McArtor	33–27–1	12–12	
1987	Gene McArtor	36–26	14–10	
1988	Gene McArtor	42–22	14–10	NCAA Regional
1989	Gene McArtor	35–27	12–12	
1990	Gene McArtor	28–27	11–13	
1991	Gene McArtor	41–20	12–12	NCAA Regional, No. 28 Final CB Poll
1992	Gene McArtor	34–22	12–12	
1993	Gene McArtor	30–19	15–10	
1994	Gene McArtor	32–26	9–19	
1995	Tim Jamieson	19–34	7–20	
1996	Tim Jamieson	39–19	20–8	Big Eight Champions, NCAA Regional, No. 29 Final CB Poll
Big 12 Conference
1997	Tim Jamieson	31–27	16–14	
1998	Tim Jamieson	36–18	17–12	
1999	Tim Jamieson	37–19	14–13	
2000	Tim Jamieson	33–24	13–14	
2001	Tim Jamieson	31–24–1	11–19	
2002	Tim Jamieson	24–29	9–16	
2003	Tim Jamieson	36–22	15–11	NCAA Regional
2004	Tim Jamieson	38–23–1	12–14	NCAA Regional
2005	Tim Jamieson	40–23	16–11	NCAA Regional, No. 21 Final BA Poll
2006	Tim Jamieson	35–28	12–15	NCAA Super Regional, No. 16 Final CB Poll
2007	Tim Jamieson	42–18	19–8	NCAA Regional, No. 24 Final CB Poll
2008	Tim Jamieson	39–21	16–11	NCAA Regional, No. 19 Final BA Poll
2009	Tim Jamieson	35–27	16–11	NCAA Regional
2010	Tim Jamieson	29–26	10–16	
2011	Tim Jamieson	27–32	11–15	
2012	Tim Jamieson	33–28	10–14	Big 12 Tournament champions, NCAA Regional
Southeastern Conference
2013	Tim Jamieson	18–32	10–20	
2014	Tim Jamieson	20–33	6–24	
2015	Tim Jamieson	30–28	15–15	
2016	Tim Jamieson	26-30	9-20	
2017	Steve Bieser	35–21	14–16	
2018	Steve Bieser	34–22	12–18	
2019	Steve Bieser	34–22–1	13–16–1	
2020	Steve Bieser	11–5	0–0	Season ended due to COVID-19 pandemic
2021	Steve Bieser	16–36	8–22	
2022	Steve Bieser	28-23	10-20	
2023	Steve Bieser	30-24	10-20	
2024	Kerrick Jackson	23-32	9-21	
2025	Kerrick Jackson	16-39	3-27	

CB=Collegiate Baseball
BA=Baseball America

== Conference membership ==
- 1891–1928: No conference
- 1929–1996: Big Eight Conference (known as Big Six 1929–46 and Big Seven 1947–57)
- 1997–2012: Big 12 Conference
- 2013–present: Southeastern Conference

== Missouri in the NCAA tournament ==
1952
College World Series

Defeated Northern Colorado, 15–1
Defeated Holy Cross 1–0
Defeated Penn State3–2
Lost to Holy Cross 3–7
Lost to Holy Cross 4–8
National Runners-Up

1954
College World Series

Defeated Lafayette 6–3
Lost to Rollins 4–1
Defeated Massachusetts 8–1
Defeated Oklahoma State 7–3
Defeated Michigan State 4–3
Defeated Rollins 4–1
National champions

1958
District V playoffs

Defeated Northern Iowa 11–7
Defeated Northern Iowa 13–3

College World Series
Defeated Western Michigan 3–1
Defeated Colorado State 11–2
Defeated Holy Cross 4–1
Defeated Western Michigan 4–1
Lost to Southern California 0–7
Lost to Southern California 7–8
National Runners-Up

1962
District V playoffs

Defeated Bradley 3–1
Defeated Bradley 9–4

College World Series
Lost to Ithaca 1–5
Lost to Santa Clara 4–7

1963
District V playoffs

Defeated Saint Louis 16–0
Lost to Saint Louis 1–2
Defeated Saint Louis 7–1

College World Series
Defeated Holy Cross 3–0
Defeated Texas 3–2
Lost to Southern California 4–5
Lost to Southern California 3–12

1964
District V playoffs

Defeated Saint Louis 2–1
Defeated Saint Louis 2–1

College World Series
Defeated Arizona State 7–0
Lost to Southern California 2–3
Defeated Seton Hall 3–1
Defeated Minnesota 4–1
Defeated Maine 2–1
Lost to Minnesota 1–5
National Runners-Up

1965
District V playoffs

Lost to Saint Louis 4–5
Lost to Saint Louis 4–5

1976
Midwest Regional

Defeated Texas A&M 5–3
Lost to Arizona 1–10
Lost to Texas A&M 1–12

1978
Midwest Regional

Lost to Eastern Michigan 2–4
Lost to Texas A&M 1–5

1980
Midwest Regional

Defeated Wichita State 5–4
Defeated Arkansas 6–0
Lost to UNLV 2–10
Lost to California 1–2

1981
South Regional

Lost to Middle Tennessee 2–4
Lost to Florida 3–7

1988
South Regional

Lost to Cal State Fullerton 3–6
Defeated Middle Tennessee 10–6
Lost to Texas A&M 6–2

1991
East Regional

Defeated Jacksonville 5–4
Lost to North Carolina State 1–3
Defeated Furman 8–4
Lost to North Carolina 5–8

1996
Midwest Regional

Lost to Rice 4–17
Lost to Wichita State 2–9

2003
Starkville, MS Regional

Lost to North Carolina 3–4
Defeated Middle Tennessee 13–7
Lost to Mississippi State 5–10

2004
Fayetteville, AR Regional

Lost to Wichita State 0–3
Defeated LeMoyne 11–3
Lost to Arkansas 7–10

2005
Fullerton, CA Regional

Lost to Arizona 3–5
Defeated Harvard 14–6
Lost to Cal State Fullerton 6–8

2006
Malibu, CA Regional

Lost to Pepperdine 2–3
Defeated UC Irvine 5–4
Defeated UCLA 2–1
Defeated Pepperdine 4–1
Defeated Pepperdine 8–3

Fullerton, CA Super Regional
Lost to Cal State Fullerton 1–7
Lost to Cal State Fullerton 1–9

2007
Columbia, MO Regional

Defeated Kent State 10–2
Defeated Louisville 7–5
Lost to Louisville 3–4
Lost to Louisville 6–16

2008
Coral Gables, FL Regional

Defeated Mississippi 7–0
Lost to Miami (FL) 5–6
Lost to Mississippi 6–9

2009
Oxford, MS Regional

Lost to Western Kentucky 5–11
Defeated Monmouth 9–0
Lost to Western Kentucky 11–6

2012
Tucson, AZ Regional

Lost to Arizona 15–3
Defeated New Mexico State 6–2
Lost to Louisville 11–3

== All-time series records against Big 12 members ==
Missouri vs.	Overall Record
Baylor	26–30–1
Iowa State	171–84–3
Kansas	213–130–2
Kansas State	165–113–1
Oklahoma	106–148–1
Oklahoma State	81–138
Texas	27–33
Texas A&M	32–40
Texas Tech	29–22
*As of May 28, 2011.

== Retired jersey numbers ==
Missouri has four retired numbers, with the most recent being Max Scherzer in 2019.

Number	Player	Position	Years at Missouri
15	Phil Bradley	OF	1979–1981
31	Max Scherzer	P	2004–2006
33	Gene McArtor	1B; Coach; Manager	1961–1963; 1969–1973; 1974–1994
34	John 'Hi' Simmons	Coach	1937–1973

== Individual awards ==
=== National awards ===
- Roger Clemens Award

Aaron Crow – 2008

==== All-Americans ====
- 1931

Sam Carter, SS
Norm Wagner, P

- 1952

Don Boenker, P
Kent Kurtz, 3B
Junior Wren, OF

- 1954

Jerry Schoonmaker, OF

- 1957

Jack Davis, OF

- 1958

Sonny Siebert, 1B
Bo Toft, OF
Ray Uriarte, 3B

- 1959

Ralph Hochgrebe, 2B

- 1960

Ron Cox, SS
Gene Orf, OF

- 1961

Gene Orf, OF

- 1963

Dave Harvey, 3B
John Sevcik, C

- 1964

Dave Harvey, 3B
Keith Weber, P

- 1965

Dan Rudanovich, OF
Bob Robben, SS

- 1967

Ray Thorpe, OF

- 1974

Mark Thiel, C

- 1975

Greg Cypret, SS

- 1976

Greg Cypret, SS
Mark Thiel, C

- 1978

Greg Cypret, SS

- 1980

Lindy Duncan, SS

- 1981

Phil Bradley, OF
Tom Heckman, P

- 1985

Dave Otto, DH

- 1987

Dave Silvestri, SS

- 1988

Dave Silvestri, SS

- 1991

John Dettmer, P

- 1994

David Sanderson, OF

- 1996

Aaron Jaworowski, 1B
Aaron Akin, P (Freshman)
Logan Dale, P (Freshman)
Justin Stine, P (Freshman)
Jason Williams, INF (Freshman)

- 1998

Ryan Fry, P

- 1999

Ryan Stegall, SS (Freshman)

- 2000

Ryan Stegall, SS
Jayce Tingler, OF (Freshman)

- 2001

Lee Laskowski, OF (Freshman)

- 2002

Travis Wendte, P (Freshman)

- 2004

Garrett Broshuis, P

- 2005

Max Scherzer, P
James Boone, OF
Jacob Priday, OF (Freshman)

- 2007

Trevor Coleman, C (Freshman)

- 2008

Aaron Crow, P
Jacob Priday, DH

- 2009

Kyle Gibson, P

- 2010

Aaron Senne, 1B

==== All-College World Series ====
- 1958

Sonny Siebert, 1B (1940s–50s All-Decade Team)
Martin Toft, OF
Hank Kuhlmann, C

- 1963

Dave Harvey, 3B

- 1964

Gary Wood, OF

=== Conference awards ===
- Big 12 Player of the Year

Aaron Senne – 2010

- Big 12 Pitcher of the Year

Max Scherzer – 2005
Aaron Crow – 2008

- Big 12 Freshman of the Year

Trevor Coleman, 2007

- Big 12 Newcomer of the Year

Jody Harris, 1999

- Big 8 Tournament Most Outstanding Player

Curt Brown – 1976
Rob Pietroburgo – 1976
Phil Bradley – 1980
Aaron Jaworowski – 1996

- Big 12 Tournament Most Outstanding Player

Cody Ehlers – 2004
Eric Garcia – 2012

==== All Big 8 ====
- 1958

Ernie Nevers, P
Sonny Siebert, 1B
Bo Toft, RF
Ray Uriarte, 3B

- 1959

Ralph Hochgrebe, 2B
John Scowcroft, OF

- 1960

Ron Cox, SS
Gene Orf, OF

- 1961

George Hulett, 3B
Gene Orf, OF

- 1962

Larry Bohannon, P
George Hulett, 3B
Bobby Jenkins, P
Dan Reilly, OF

- 1963

Dave Harvey, 3B
Gene McArtor, 1B
Bob Price, 2B
John Sevcik, C
Jack Stroud, P

- 1964

Jim Estes, OF
Dave Harvey, 3B
John Sevcik, C
Keith Weber, P

- 1965

Bob Robben, SS
Dan Rudanovich, OF
Mike Strode, 2B

- 1967

Gene Stephenson, 1B
Ray Thorpe, OF

- 1968

Bill Griffin, 1B
Rick Henninger, P

- 1969

Del Blunk, OF
Steve Patchin, C

- 1970

Steve Patchin, OF
Neil Sloman, OF

- 1971

Jack Bastable, 3B
Bill Todd, P

- 1972

Jack Bastable, 3B

- 1974

Tom Ellis, OF
Mark Thiel, C

- 1975

Tom Ellis, OF

- 1976

Greg Cypret, SS
Mark Thiel, C

- 1977

Greg Cypret, SS
John Kruse, 2B
Rob Pietroburgo, P

- 1978

Curt Brown, 1B
Greg Cypret, SS
Rob Pietroburgo, P

- 1979

Jim English, 1B
Tom Heckman, P
Tim Laudner, C

- 1980

Lindy Duncan, SS
Tom Heckman, P

- 1981

Phil Bradley, OF
Tom Heckman, P
Kevin Knop, 2B

- 1982

Shane Fairbanks, SS
Roger Johnson, DH
John Marquardt, SS
Kurt Moody, P

- 1983

John Marquardt, SS

- 1985

Dave Otto, DH

- 1986

Marcus Adler, 2B

- 1987

Tony Russo, P
Dave Silvestri, SS

- 1988

Tim Clark, 2B
Dave Silvestri, SS

- 1989

Tim Hawkins, OF
Jon Pittenger, 3B

- 1990

John Dettmer, P
Darnel Hawkins, OF

- 1991

John Dettmer, P
Joe Winkler, OF

- 1992

John Dettmer, P
Rodney Weary, 1B

- 1993

Chopper Littrell, OF
Jason Meyhoff, P

- 1994

Grant Ingram, DH

- 1996

Aaron Jaworowski, 1B

==== All Big 12 ====
- 1998

Ryan Fry, OF
Chris George, P
Griffin Moore, INF
Justin Stine, P

- 1999

Jody Harris, P
Justin Stine, P
Aaron Wilson, 3B

- 2000

Ryan Stegall, SS

- 2002

Cody Ehlers, DH
Jayce Tingler, OF

- 2003

Jayce Tingler, OF
Brad Flanders, C
Justin James, P
Ian Kinsler, SS

- 2004

Garrett Broshuis, P
Lee Laskowski, OF
Ryan Rallo, OF

- 2005

James Boone, OF
Max Scherzer, P
Nathan Culp, P
Hunter Mense, OF
Taylor Parker, P

- 2006

Nathan Culp, P
Jacob Priday, OF

- 2007

Aaron Crow, P
Jacob Priday, OF
Evan Frey, OF

- 2008

Aaron Crow, P
Jacob Priday, DH
Aaron Senne, OF
Trevor Coleman, C

- 2009

Greg Folgia, OF
Kyle Gibson, P

- 2010

Aaron Senne, 1B
Brett Nicholas, Util

- 2011

Jonah Schmidt, DH

==== All Big 8 Tournament Team ====
- 1976

Curt Brown, 1B
Greg Cypret, SS
Al Hightower, OF
Jim Leavitt, OF
Rob Pietroburgo, P

- 1977

Al Hightower, OF
Tim Laudner, C
Tom Bloemke, P

- 1978

Al Hightower, OF
Tim Laudner, C

- 1980

Phil Bradley, OF
Scott Collins, 3B
Lindy Duncan, SS
Mark Maurer, OF
Kurt Moody, P

- 1981

Phil Bradley, OF
Shane Fairbanks, OF
Bill Hance, C

- 1983

Bill Hance, C
Shane Fairbanks, OF
John Marquardt, SS

- 1984

Nick Rallo, 2B

- 1986

Mike Rogers, 1B

- 1987

Doug Bock, C
Tim Clark, 2B

- 1988

Tim Clark, 2B
Dave Silvestri, SS

- 1989

Scott Black, P
Tim Hawkins, OF
Todd Moseley, P
Tim Pinkowski, C
Bard Womack, OF

- 1991

Joe Winkler, OF
Shane Meador, C

- 1994

Brent Chamberlain, C

- 1996

Aaron Jaworowski, 1B
Bryan Seymour, OF

==== All Big 12 Tournament Team ====
- 2000

Landon Brandes, 3B

- 2004

Mark Alexander, P
James Boone, OF
Garrett Broshuis, P
Cody Ehlers, 1B
Lee Laskowski, OF

- 2005

James Boone, OF
Jacob Priday, C
Zane Taylor, INF

- 2006

Max Scherzer, P

- 2007

Brock Bond, 2B

- 2008

Jacob Priday, DH

- 2009

Ryan Lollis, OF

- 2010

Ryan Gebhart, OF

- 2011

Kelly Fick, P
Conner Mach, OF
Jonah Schmidt, DH

- 2012

Blake Brown, OF
Jeff Emens, P
Eric Garcia, SS
Dane Opel, OF

== Current and former major league players ==
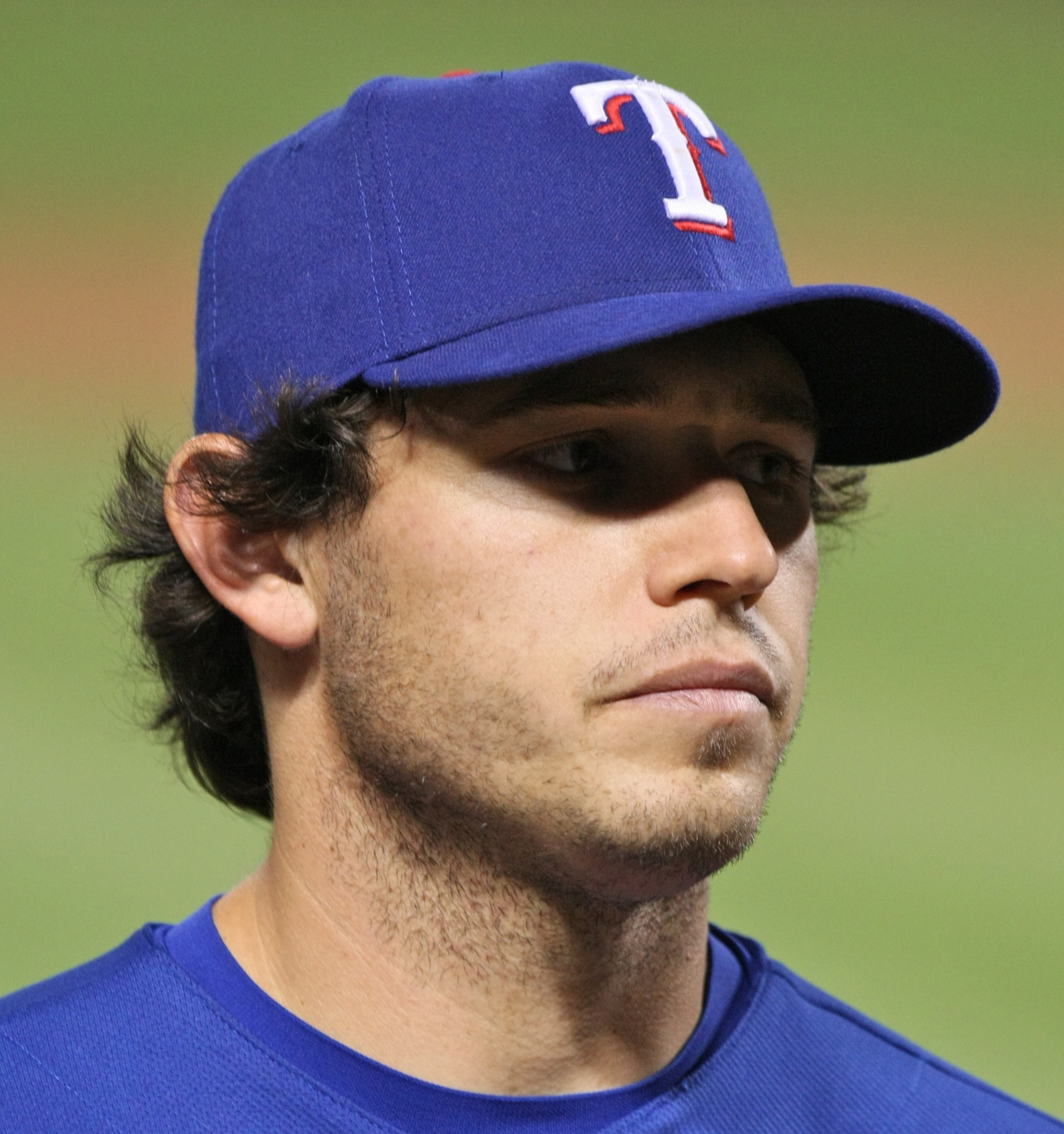
Ian Kinsler

- Joe Bennett
- Phil Bradley
- Dennis Burns
- Byron Browne
- Jeff Cornell
- Jake Crawford
- Aaron Crow
- John Dettmer
- Jay Difani
- Kyle Gibson
- Jay Hankins
- Rick Henninger
- Neal Hertweck
- Tanner Houck
- Charlie James
- Justin James
- Dick Kenworthy
- Ian Kinsler
- Tim Laudner
- Scott Little
- Doug Mathis
- Ron Mathis
- Carl Miles
- Bryce Montes de Oca
- Dennis Musgraves
- John O'Donoghue
- Dave Otto
- Hub Pruett
- Max Scherzer
- Jerry Schoonmaker
- John Sevcik
- Art Shamsky
- Mike Shannon
- Sonny Siebert
- Dave Silvestri
- Bob Smith
- Homer Summa
- Nick Tepesch
- Bill Windle
- Glenn Wright
- Rob Zastryzny

Source: Baseball Reference

== Gallery ==
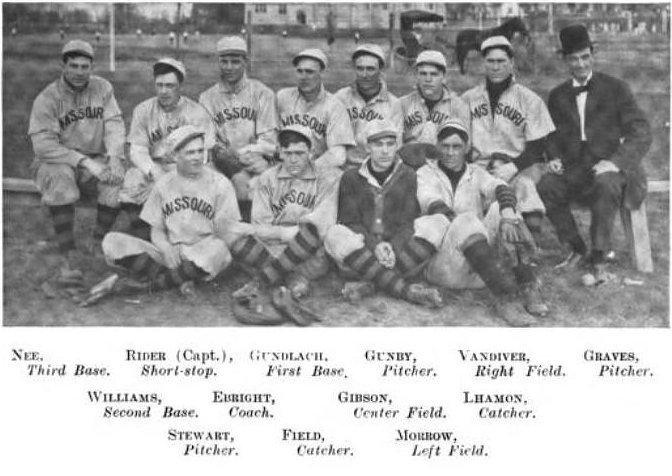
1907 Missouri Tigers Baseball Team

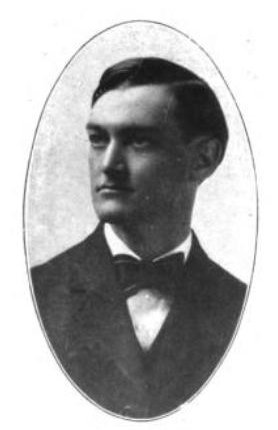
Coach Mills Ebright

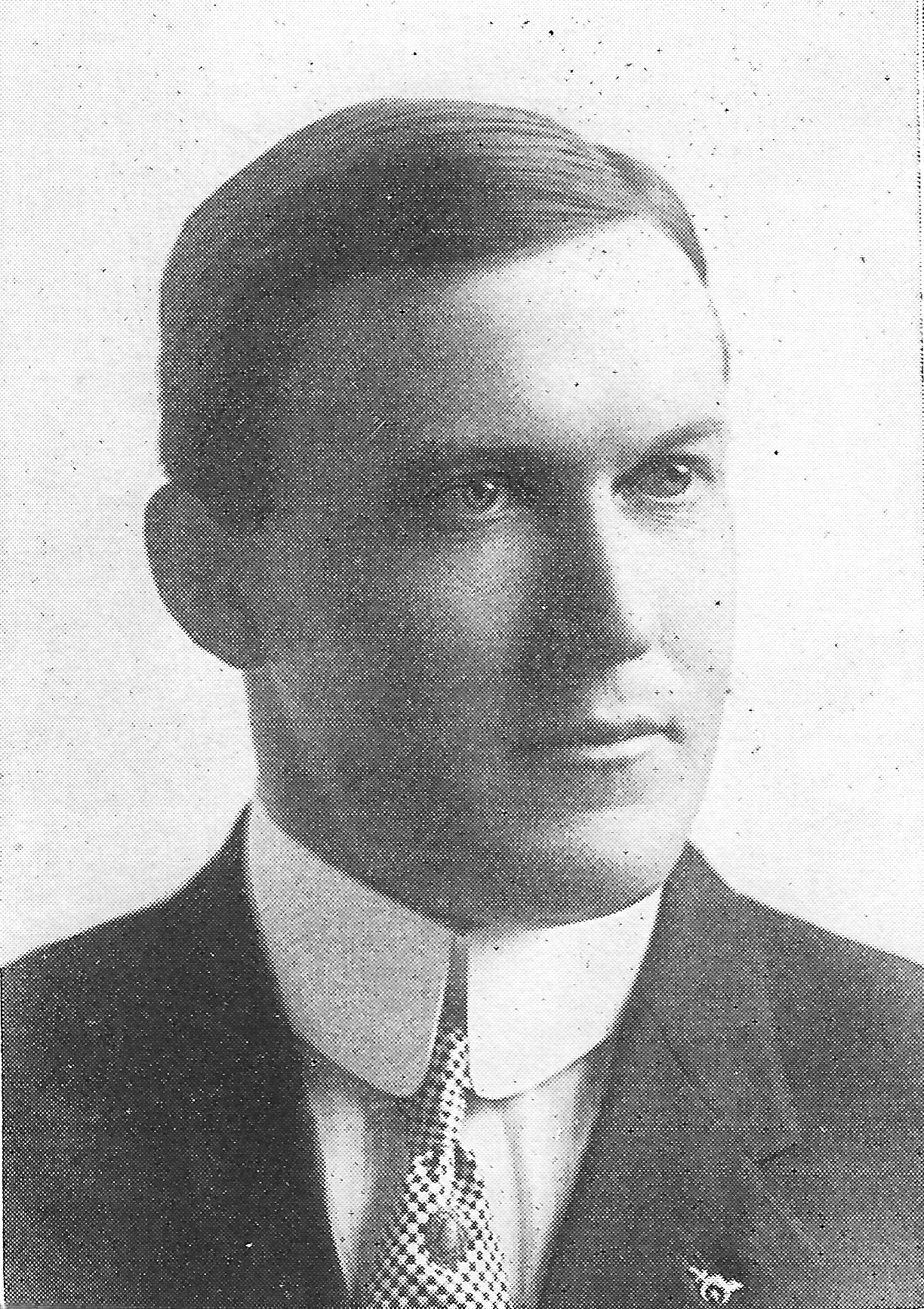
Coach Chester Brewer

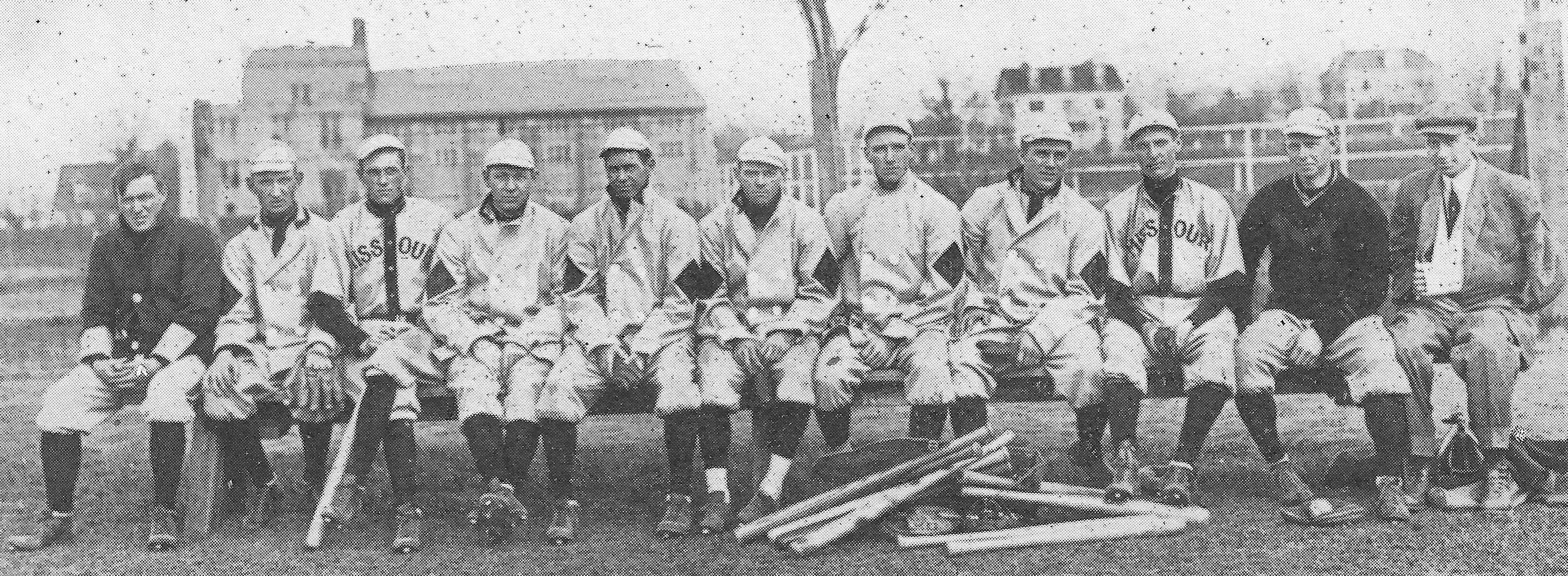
1911 Missouri Tigers Baseball Team

== See also ==
- List of NCAA Division I baseball programs
