= Gene McArtor =

American baseball coach (1940s–2024)

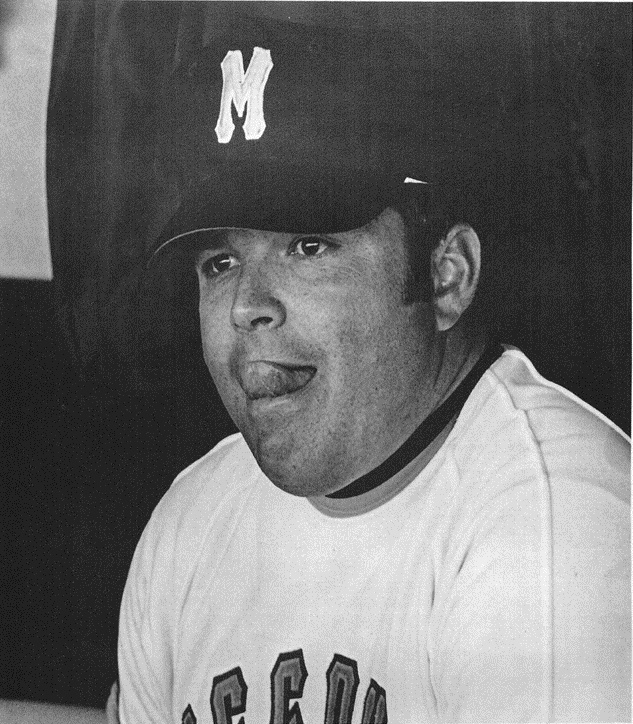
- McArtor from The Savitar, 1974

Biographical details
- Born: 1940/1941; St. Louis, Missouri, U.S.
- Died: July 28, 2024 (aged 83)

Playing career
- 1961–1963: Missouri
- Position: First Base

Coaching career (HC unless noted)
- 1969–1973: Missouri (Asst.)
- 1974–1994: Missouri

Head coaching record
- Overall: 733-430-3

Accomplishments and honors

Championships
- 2× Big 8 Champion (1976, 1980)

Awards
- 2× Big 8 Coach of the Year (1976, 1980); ABCA Hall of Fame (1993)

Gene McArtor (1940/1941 – July 28, 2024) was the head baseball coach at Missouri from 1974–1994 and was the NCAA National Coordinator of Baseball Umpires for many years beginning in 2008.

== Early life ==
A native of St. Louis, Missouri, McArtor graduated from Webster Groves High School in 1958.

== Playing career ==
McArtor was a first baseman at the University of Missouri from 1961 to 1963 under head coach Hi Simmons. In 1963, McArtor earned first-team All-Big 8 Conference honors and All-District V honors. McArtor helped lead Missouri to back-to-back Big 8 Conference Championships and to appearances in the 1962 and 1963 College World Series.

== Coaching career ==
After teaching and coaching in St. Louis, in 1969, McArtor returned to Missouri as an assistant baseball coach under Hi Simmons. Upon Simmons' retirement after the 1973 season, McArtor took over as head coach in 1974, a position he would hold for the next 21 seasons. In 21 seasons, McArtor suffered just one losing season.

McArtor led Missouri to Big 8 Conference championships in 1976 and 1980 and to appearances in the NCAA tournament in 1976, 1978, 1980, 1981, 1988, and 1991.

McArtor coached 41 All-Big 8 Conference players and 13 All-Americans. He coached a number of players who went on to play Major League Baseball, including Jeff Cornell, Tim Laudner, Ron Mathis, Phil Bradley, Scott Little, Dave Otto, Dave Silvestri, and John Dettmer.

== Legacy ==
McArtor was inducted into the American Baseball Coaches Association Hall of Fame in 1993.

In 1997 McArtor received the Lefty Gomez Award from the American Baseball Coaches Association for his contributions to the game of baseball.

In 1999 McArtor was inducted into the University of Missouri Intercollegiate Athletics Hall of Fame.

In 2007 McArtor was inducted into the Missouri Sports Hall of Fame.

In 2010 the new indoor baseball facility at the University of Missouri was named McArtor Baseball Facility in his honor.

== Death ==
McArtor died on July 28, 2024, at the age of 83.

== Head coaching record ==
Record table
Season	Team	Overall	Conference	Standing	Postseason
Missouri Tigers (Big 8 Conference) (1974–1994)
1974	Missouri	28–14	12–9	3rd	
1975	Missouri	17–20	8–10	6th	
1976	Missouri	46–22	4–1	1st	Midwest Regional
1977	Missouri	36–15	9–1	2nd	
1978	Missouri	35–18	7–3	2nd	Mideast Regional
1979	Missouri	45–12	16–4	3rd	
1980	Missouri	45–15–1	15–5	1st	Midwest Regional
1981	Missouri	43–18	17–6	3rd	South Regional
1982	Missouri	39–17	12–9	4th	
1983	Missouri	25–16	7–8	3rd	
1984	Missouri	27–20–1	7–8	4th	
1985	Missouri	36–27	7–17		
1986	Missouri	33–27–1	12–12	3rd	
1987	Missouri	36–26	14–10	3rd	
1988	Missouri	42–22	14–10	3rd	South Regional
1989	Missouri	35–27	12–12	2nd	
1990	Missouri	28–27	11–13	5th	
1991	Missouri	41–20	12–12	3rd	East Regional
1992	Missouri	34–22	12–12	4th	
1993	Missouri	30–19	15–10	3rd	
1994	Missouri	32–26	9–19–	6th	
Total:		733–430–3			
National champion Postseason invitational champion Conference regular season champion Conference regular season and conference tournament champion Division regular season champion Division regular season and conference tournament champion Conference tournament champion
