= Garrett Broshuis =

American baseball player

- Pitcher
- Born: December 18, 1981 (age 44); Cape Girardeau, Missouri, U.S.
- Bats: Right Throws: Right
- Stats at Baseball Reference

Garrett Ray Broshuis (born December 18, 1981) is an American attorney, athletes' rights advocate, and former professional baseball player in the San Francisco Giants organization. He was drafted in the 5th round of the 2004 Major League Baseball draft after an All-American career at the University of Missouri. He was also a first team Academic All-American and is a member of Phi Beta Kappa honor's society. As a player, he wrote extensively about life in minor league baseball initially for the Sporting News and later for Baseball America. He represents minor league baseball players in a landmark minimum wage case that settled for $185 million, and helped Minor League Baseball players unionize in 2022.

== Early life ==
Broshuis was born in the small town of Advance, Missouri, where he attended high school and graduated valedictorian with a perfect 4.0 GPA. He was named All-State in basketball and baseball and was selected as one of Missouri's Top 100 High School Scholars.

Broshuis attended the University of Missouri on both academic and athletic scholarships. He graduated with a 3.92 GPA and earned a bachelor's degree in Psychology with minors in Political Science and Spanish in 2004.

During his last season with the Missouri Tigers baseball team, Broshuis achieved a perfect 11–0 season. While there he played with future Major League Baseball stars such as Ian Kinsler and Max Scherzer. He helped lead the Tigers to two NCAA Regional appearances. In 2004, he was named a third-team All-American, a first-team Academic All-American, and was Missouri's nominee for the Big 12 Conference's 2004 Student-Athlete of the Year.

== Baseball career ==
The San Francisco Giants selected Broshuis in the fifth round of the 2004 Major League Baseball draft. Upon being drafted by the Giants, Broshuis was assigned to the short-season Salem-Keizer Volcanoes of the Northwest League before moving on to the San Jose Giants of the California League. In 2005, Broshuis was named to Baseball America's list of top 30 prospects for the Giants. Broshuis returned to San Jose that season, and he finished second in the league in wins and in the top 10 in ERA. This led to a late-season promotion to the Fresno Grizzlies of the Pacific Coast League, a Triple-A league.

In 2006, Broshuis was sent to the Connecticut Defenders of the Eastern League, where he played for the next three years, leading the league in losses during the 2007 campaign before finishing second in the league in wins during the 2008 season. His playing career ended after the 2009 season.

== Writing career ==
In 2006, Broshuis began writing a blog for The Sporting News. He did this for three years, writing over 100 articles in a Life in the Minors column. He also wrote pieces for several other publications. In 2009 and 2010, Broshuis wrote a regular column for Baseball America.

== Law career ==
In 2010, Broshuis enrolled in the Saint Louis University School of Law. For the 2011–2012 school year, Broshuis was a staff member for Volume 56 of the Saint Louis University Law Journal. During his last year of law school, Broshuis served as the Editor-in-Chief for Volume 57 of the Journal. He graduated valedictorian of his law school class in 2013.

Broshuis is one of the lawyers representing former minor league players Aaron Senne and many other minor league players in their lawsuit against Major League Baseball for violating wage and overtime laws. The case prompted legislative action, with Congress passing the Save America's Pastime Act in 2018. The act amended the federal minimum wage law to create an exemption for minor league baseball players. Despite this, the lawsuit ultimately succeeded in garnering a $185 million settlement and securing important changes to the players' contracts in 2022.

In 2020, Broshuis co-founded the non-profit Advocates for Minor Leaguers. The non-profit advocated for better working conditions in minor league baseball, and it began organizing a player leadership group. Broshuis served as the President of Advocates for Minor Leaguers from 2020 until 2021. The non-profit was instrumental in the unionization of minor league players in 2022.

For his work on behalf of minor league players, Broshuis was named to the National Law Journal's 2023 list of Plaintiffs' Lawyer Trailblazers. He was also named a Leading Commercial Litigator by the Daily Journal Corporation.
