= Missouri Tigers =

Intercollegiate sports teams of the University of Missouri

- University: University of Missouri
- Nickname: Mizzou
- NCAA: Division I (FBS)
- Conference: SEC (primary); Big 12 (wrestling)
- Athletic director: Laird Veatch
- Location: Columbia, Missouri
- Varsity teams: 20 (9 men's and 11 women's)
- Football stadium: Faurot Field ("The Zou") at Memorial Stadium
- Basketball arena: Mizzou Arena
- Baseball stadium: Taylor Stadium
- Volleyball arena: Hearnes Center
- Other venues: Hearnes Center
- Colors: Black and gold
- Mascot: Truman the Tiger
- Fight song: "Every True Son - Fight Tigers!"
- Website: mutigers.com

The Missouri Tigers intercollegiate athletics programs represent the University of Missouri, located in Columbia. The name comes from a band of armed Union Home Guards called the "Fighting Tigers of Columbia" who, in 1864, protected Columbia from Confederate guerrillas during the American Civil War.

SEC logo in Missouri's colors

The University of Missouri (often referred to as "Mizzou" or "MU") is the flagship institution of the University of Missouri System. Mizzou is a member of the Southeastern Conference (SEC) and is one of two NCAA Football Bowl Subdivision programs in Missouri. Its men's wrestling program, the only wrestling program sponsored by an SEC member school before Oklahoma joined the conference in 2024, competes as an affiliate member of the Big 12 Conference.

Prior to joining the SEC in 2012, Missouri was a charter member of the Big 12 Conference, which was created with the merger of the former Big Eight Conference and four schools from the former Southwest Conference (one of these schools, Texas A&M, joined the SEC with Missouri in 2012), and which began athletic competition in the 1996–97 academic year. Missouri competed in the Missouri Valley Intercollegiate Athletic Association starting in 1907, which officially changed its name to the Big Eight Conference in 1964.

== Sports sponsored ==
Men's sports	Women's sports
Baseball	Basketball
Basketball	Cross country
Cross country	Golf
Football	Gymnastics
Golf	Soccer
Swimming & diving	Softball
Track & field^{†}	Swimming & diving
Wrestling	Tennis
	Track & field^{†}
	Volleyball
† – Track and field includes both indoor and outdoor.

=== Baseball ===
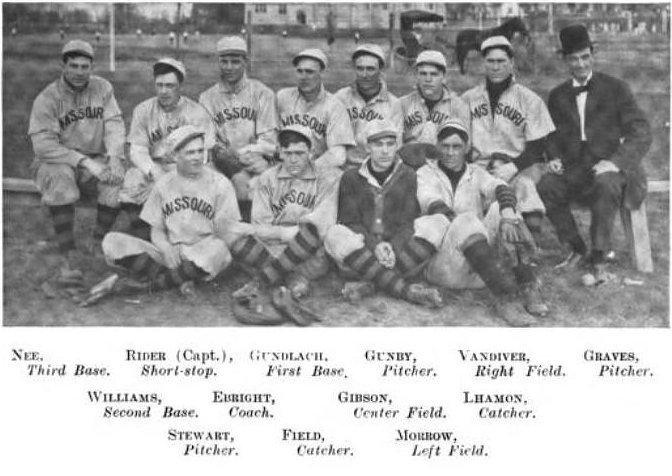
1907 baseball team

The first Missouri Tigers baseball team was in 1868. The first recorded season was in 1891, when the Tigers went 2–2. The Tigers won the National Championship in 1954. The presence of former Missouri Tiger baseball players in professional baseball continues to grow each year.

Former MU head coach Tim Jamieson has seen 40 players in his 13-year tenure sign pro contracts. Notable Tiger baseball alumni include Tim Laudner, who played for the 1987 World Champion Minnesota Twins, and Phil Bradley, who played for several teams in the 1980s and early 1990s, and former Major Leaguer Ian Kinsler. In 2006, pitcher Max Scherzer was selected in the first round with the 11th overall pick by the Arizona Diamondbacks. Scherzer went on to win the Al Cy Young Award with the Detroit Tigers in 2013. In 2008, pitcher Aaron Crow was picked 9th overall by the Washington Nationals.

=== Basketball ===
==== Men's basketball ====
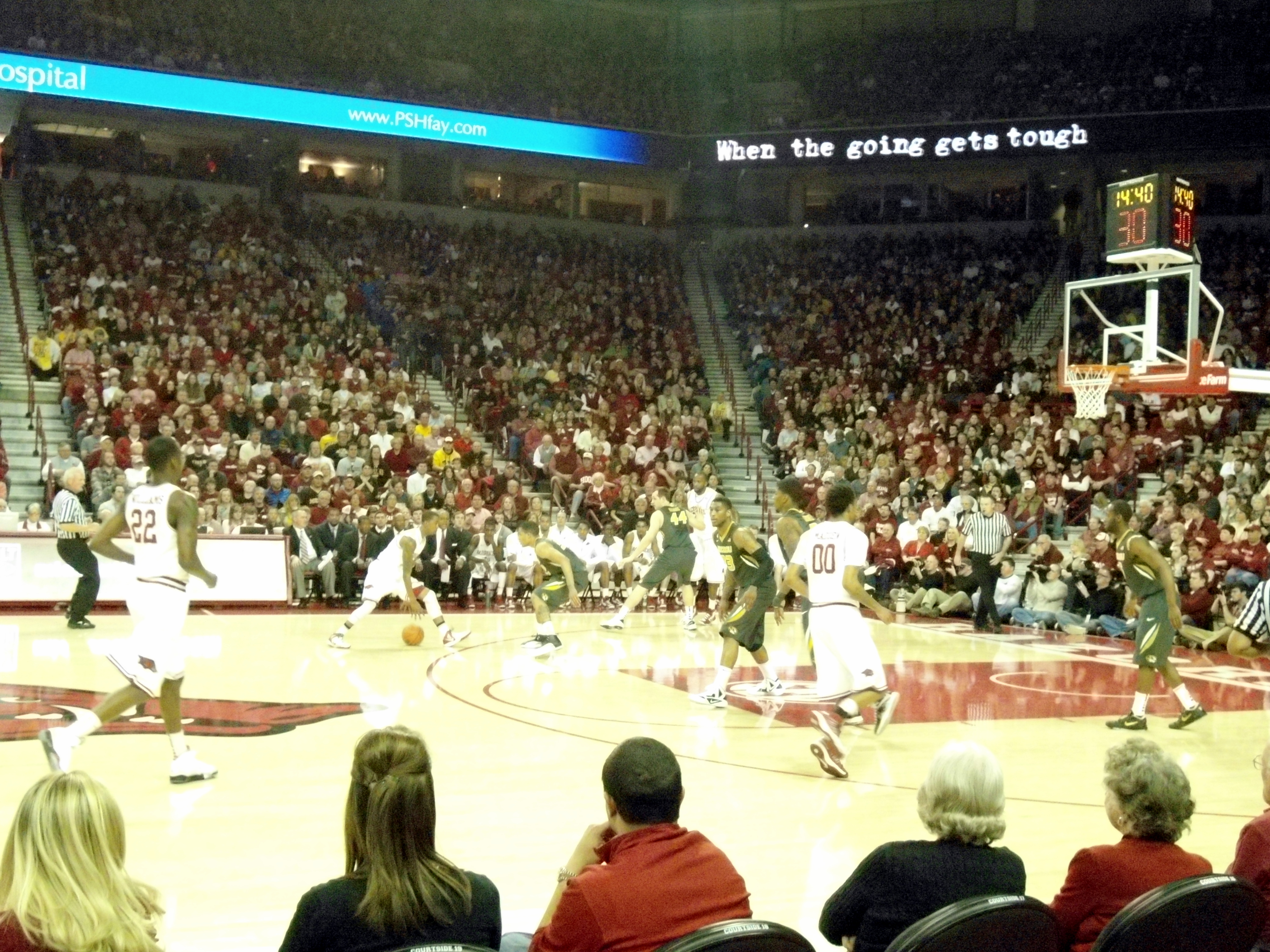
Missouri at Arkansas game in 2013

The men's basketball program has produced several NBA players, including Michael Porter Jr., Anthony Peeler, Doug Smith, Jon Sundvold, Steve Stipanovich, Kareem Rush, Keyon Dooling, Linas Kleiza, Thomas Gardner, Jordan Clarkson, and DeMarre Carroll. The Tigers were regularly a national power under Norm Stewart, whose tenure spanned four decades but which failed to include a Final Four appearance despite numerous conference championships. The team advanced to the Elite Eight under Quin Snyder in 2002, but inconsistent performance and various improprieties in his leadership of the program caused him to be fired in the midst of an abysmal 2006 season. He was replaced with then-UAB head coach Mike Anderson. In 2009 the team lost in the Elite Eight to the Connecticut Huskies. Then, after a first-round exit from the NCAA tournament in 2011, Anderson took the head coaching position with the University of Arkansas. The head coaching vacancy was filled in early April 2011 with Frank Haith, the former Miami (Florida) head coach who left after the 2013 season to go Tulsa. In 2014, Kim Anderson became the new head basketball coach. The program is now led by Dennis Gates.

Although the University of Missouri has never won the NCAA tournament (established in 1939) or been officially recognized by the NCAA as a national champion, the 1920–21 and 1921–22 teams were retroactively designated as the top-ranked teams in the Premo-Porretta Power Poll, an unofficial mathematical rating system for the pre-tournament era.

==== Women's basketball ====
The current head coach of the women's basketball program is Kellie Harper, formerly of Tennessee. She was hired in April 2025 to replace Robin Pingeton, whose contract expired after the 2024–25 season.

=== Football ===
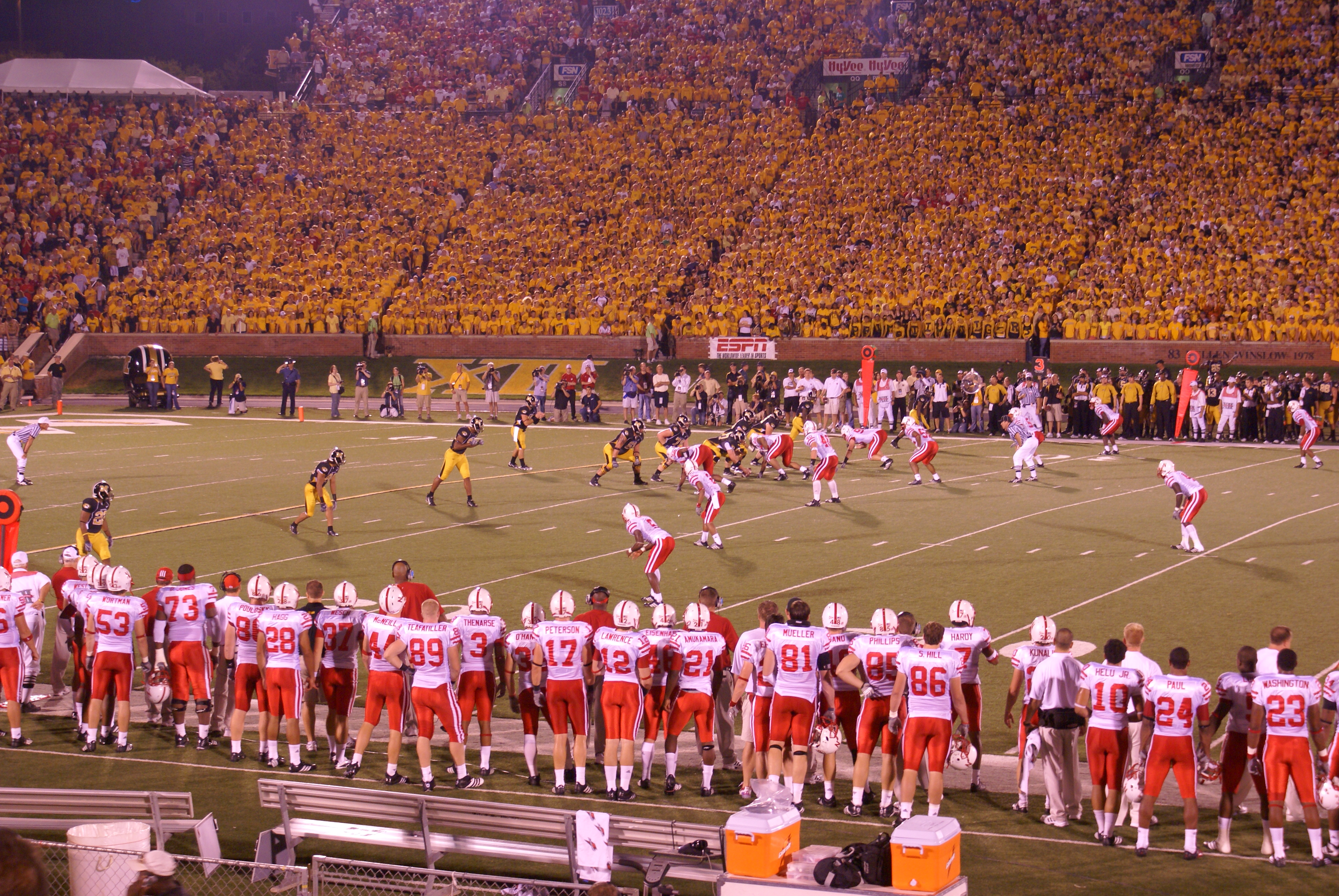
Chase Daniel takes a snap in the first quarter of the 2007 Mizzou vs. Nebraska football game

The university's first football team was formed in 1890 by the sophomore class of the "Academic School" (now the College of Arts and Science). They challenged a team of Engineering students in April of that year upon encouragement of Dr. A. L. McRea, a university professor. Interest in the sport quickly grew among the students, professors, and administrators, and a Foot Ball Association was formed at a meeting on October 10, 1890. The first intercollegiate game for the university took place on Thanksgiving Day, 1890, when Missouri played Washington University before a crowd of 3,000 in St. Louis, Missouri. The Washington University team, which had already been playing for several years, easily defeated the University of Missouri team by a score of 28–0. Missouri has compiled a 17-21 record in bowl games as of the end of the 2025 season, including wins in the Orange, Sugar, and Cotton Bowls. It has finished in the final Associated Press poll Top Ten eight times since the poll began in 1936, and has had two top-five finishes since 2007. The team claims the 1960 National Championship.

=== Gymnastics ===
The women's gymnastics was formed in 1980. The team finished third at the 2025 NCAA Championship Finals, reaching the final for the first time in program history. Helen Hu also made history, earning first place on balance beam. The team is coached by Shannon Welker, who has been in the position since 2014.

=== Softball ===
Missouri softball began play in 1975. Missouri has appeared in seven Women's College World Series, in 1981, 1983, 1991, 1994, 2009, 2010 and 2011.

=== Volleyball ===
Missouri volleyball began play in 1974. They have played in the NCAA Tournament 16 times, most recently in 2019. The furthest they have advanced in the tournament is the quarterfinals in 2005. They have won 2 conference championships, both of those in the SEC. The current head coach is Joshua Taylor, who was appointed head coach in 2019.

=== Wrestling ===
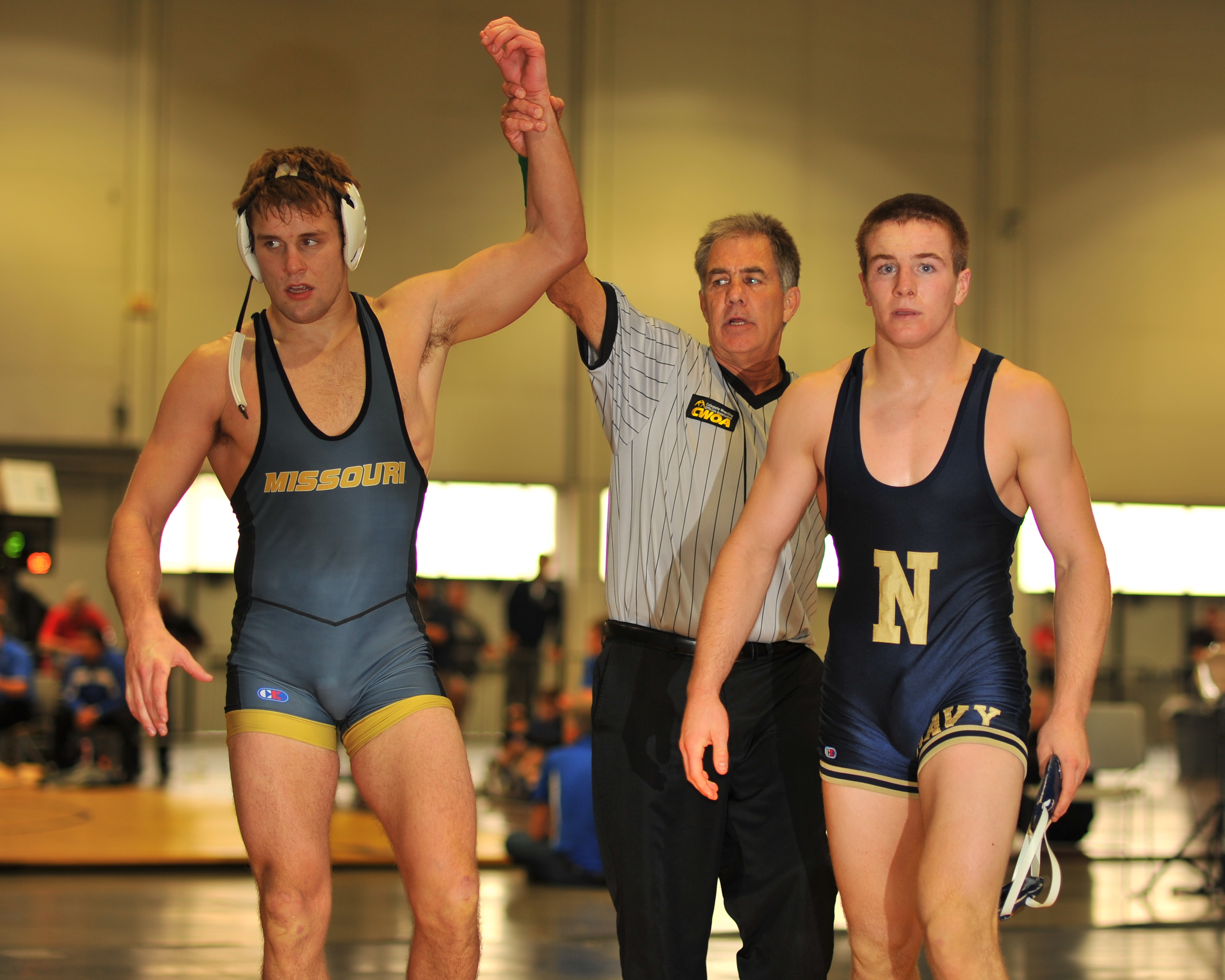
A Missouri wrestler (left) after winning a match against a Navy Midshipmen wrestler in 2012

Hearnes Center is home to the Missouri Tigers' nationally ranked wrestling program. The Tigers have produced 8 Individual National Champions, 81 All-Americans, 10 conference titles and two NCAA Championship team trophies. For 23 years Brian Smith has been the university's head wrestling coach. Since 1998, Smith has received honors for his coaching accomplishments at the University of Missouri: Dan Gable Coach of the Year (2007), NWCA President (2010–12), Big 12 Coach of the Year (2012). Coach Smith has a 305-101-3 dual meet record.

Ben Askren and J'den Cox have gone on to compete for the United States in Olympic Games: 2008 and 2016. Cox earned the bronze medal at 86 kg. Cox was the 92 kg Freestyle World Champion in 2018 and 2019.

Askren, Tyron Woodley, and Michael Chandler are among the few from the university's wrestling program to make the transition to Mixed Martial Arts. Askren is a 4-time All-American wrestler (2004–2007), 2-time NCAA Division I Collegiate National Runner-up (2004, 2005), 2-time NCAA Division I Collegiate National Champion (2006, 2007), 2-time Dan Hodge Trophy Collegiate Wrestler of the Year (2006, 2007), and competed in the 2008 Olympics. He has been inducted into the University of Missouri Intercollegiate Athletics Hall of Fame (2012). Askren is the former Bellator Welterweight Champion, former One Welterweight Champion, and former UFC Welterweight contender, having retired from MMA after his loss to Demian Maia. Chandler is a former Tiger wrestler earning All-American honors in 2009 (5th place 157 lbs.), who was the 3 time Bellator Lightweight Champion. Woodley is a former UFC Welterweight champion and former Strikeforce Welterweight title challenger.

== Notable non-varsity sports ==
=== Disc golf ===
The Mizzou Disc Golf Club formed in 2018. Mizzou won the men's and women's national championships in 2022 and the women's national championship in 2023. The teams regularly play at four disc golf courses in Columbia.

=== Rugby ===
The University of Missouri Men's Rugby Club plays Division 1-AA college rugby in the Heart of America conference against traditional rivals such as Kansas and Kansas State. Mizzou has been led since 2010 by head coach Don Corwin. Missouri rugby finished the 2011–2012 season ranked 17th. As the winner of the Heart of America conference, Missouri qualified for the playoffs of the 2012 men's collegiate DI-AA championships, reaching the round of 16 before losing to Wisconsin. Mizzou defeated Kansas 24–7 to finish third at the 2012 Heart of America 7s tournament. Mizzou was again successful during the 2013–2014 season, reaching the D1-AA national playoffs, where they defeated Middle Tennessee 46–10 in the round of 16 before losing in the quarterfinals to Bowling Green. Missouri saw more national success under Corwin in the 2017 season reaching the national semifinals before losing to Florida State. The sevens program has also seen success at the national stage, qualifying for the national tournament in 2017, 2018, 2019 and most recently in 2023, where the Tigers finished fifth in the Division One bracket of National Collegiate Rugby, their best ever finish in sevens.

=== Racquetball ===
The University of Missouri Club Racquetball team has had success recently. The women's team won back-to-back Division 1 titles in 2015 and 2016 at the USA Racquetball Intercollegiate Championships. The overall team placed 2nd and 3rd respectively in those years.

== Rivalries ==
=== University of Kansas ===
Historically, the Tigers' biggest rival was the Kansas Jayhawks, with whom they competed in the annual Border War. This was one of the most intense rivalries in college sports, going back to a time of actual armed conflict between pro-slavery residents from Missouri and anti-slavery residents of the Kansas Territory, known as Bleeding Kansas. The series ended for the foreseeable future once Mizzou moved to the SEC.

The Kansas–Missouri football series is the second-oldest and second-most-played rivalry in college football history. (See: The Rivalry (Lafayette–Lehigh)) The teams first matched up in football on October 31, 1891. Missouri claims to lead the all-time series, 58–54–9, since it counts the forfeit of Kansas' 1960 victory as a win. Missouri claims the 1911 football game in Columbia, Missouri as the world's first Homecoming. An important meeting between the Tigers and Jayhawks occurred on November 24, 2007, when the two teams played for the Big 12 North Championship and a shot at playing for the Big 12 Championship and a possible National Championship. The Tigers defeated the Jayhawks 36–28. The Tigers season later resulted in a trip to the Cotton Bowl Classic, where they defeated Arkansas 38–7.

=== University of Oklahoma ===
The Tiger–Sooner Peace Pipe is a rivalry trophy presented to the winner of the Missouri vs. Oklahoma game.

The trophy is a ceremony of smoking the old pipe. The trophy was inaugurated in 1929 by Chester M. Brewer, Mizzou's director of athletics, and by members of Mystical Seven, a University of Missouri honorary group. The peace pipe was donated by a Mr. R. L. Hill, an "M" man and former president of the Missouri student body. Ceremony takes place during halves, with Mystical Seven representing Missouri, and a similar organization representing Oklahoma. Missouri won the first game, 13–0.

During Mizzou's tenure in the Big 12, the conference's divisional play structure meant that the Tigers and the Sooners only faced off two out every four years. Therefore, only scheduled games between the two teams count for the exchange of the Peace Pipe. The most recent Big 12 Championship games featuring Mizzou and Oklahoma would not have triggered a transfer of the Peace Pipe (if Missouri had won on either occasion.)

Oklahoma leads the all-time series with a record of 65–23–5.

In 2010, Mizzou, ranked no. 11 in the BCS standings, defeated no. 1 ranked Oklahoma, 36–27.

Oklahoma leads the series since the trophy tradition started with a record of 56–14–4.

On July 30, 2021, Oklahoma accepted an invitation to join the Southeastern Conference. Once they join, they will become Missouri's most played conference rival by a landslide.

=== University of Arkansas ===
Missouri's newest rivalry after joining the SEC is with the Arkansas Razorbacks, known as the Battle Line Rivalry. Both the Razorbacks and Tigers have played five times before playing annually in the same conference which started in 2014. Arkansas was one of the founding members of the Southwest Conference along with the Texas Longhorns. The Razorbacks left the Southwest Conference to join the SEC, which triggered the Southwest and the Big Eight Conferences to merge to form the Big 12 in 1996. Arkansas is placed in the West Division of the SEC while Missouri is placed in the East and with the SEC current football scheduling format a team from the West and the East divisions must play annually. To keep traditional rivalries ongoing in the SEC, the conference dropped Arkansas's cross-division annual match up with South Carolina to replace the Gamecocks with the Tigers due to the proximity of the two universities. Missouri currently leads the football series 10–4.

=== University of South Carolina ===
Also known as Battle for Columbia due to the two universities in the city of Columbia in their respective states. Both the Tigers and the Gamecocks play for Missouri's newest Trophy game, the Mayors' Cup. The trophy was created in 2012 when Missouri joined the conference. Both teams are in the East division of the SEC and will play annually along with the other five members of the division. Missouri currently leads the series at 8–5 and the trophy series at 6–5.

=== University of Nebraska ===
The Missouri-Nebraska football series was another historic rivalry alongside the MU–KU series, although it ended with Nebraska's departure for the Big Ten Conference. The Missouri–Nebraska series was the second oldest rivalry in the Big 12, dating back to 1892. The two teams met 104 times, with Nebraska leading the series 65–36–3. The large lead was the result of a 24-year Nebraska winning streak from 1979 to 2002. The teams split the eight games played from 2003 to 2010. The rivalry saw renewed interest following the Flea Kicker. The two teams played for the Victory Bell trophy, which was first awarded in 1927.

=== University of Illinois ===
There is also a relatively new basketball rivalry with the Illinois Fighting Illini of the Big Ten Conference referred to as Braggin' Rights. The Braggin' Rights game debuted in 1980 and has been played every year since 1983. Missouri trails the series 20–11. The start of football season also often matches the two schools in the "Arch Rivalry" game, most recently played at the Edward Jones Dome. Mizzou leads the football series with an all-time record of 14–7 since 1896. In addition, the Missouri and Illinois baseball teams have recently begun a baseball rivalry, meeting at Busch Stadium since 2005 (though the schools did not meet in 2009 or 2011). Missouri leads the series 5-1 since 2005.

=== Iowa State University ===
The Telephone Trophy started during a 1959 Game featuring Iowa State and Missouri when the field phones were tested prior to the game, it was found that both teams could hear each other. The problem was solved by game time, but not without considerable worry on the part of the coaches. The Northwestern Bell Telephone Co. of Ames had a trophy made and presented it to Iowa State to be awarded each year to the team winning the game. An odd sidelight to the whole affair was that the same thing happened to Missouri later in the year in a game played at Columbia. Missouri won the first game, 14–0.

The series is 58–34–9 in favor of Missouri.

Missouri leads the series since the trophy tradition started with a record of 30–18–3.

== Traditions ==
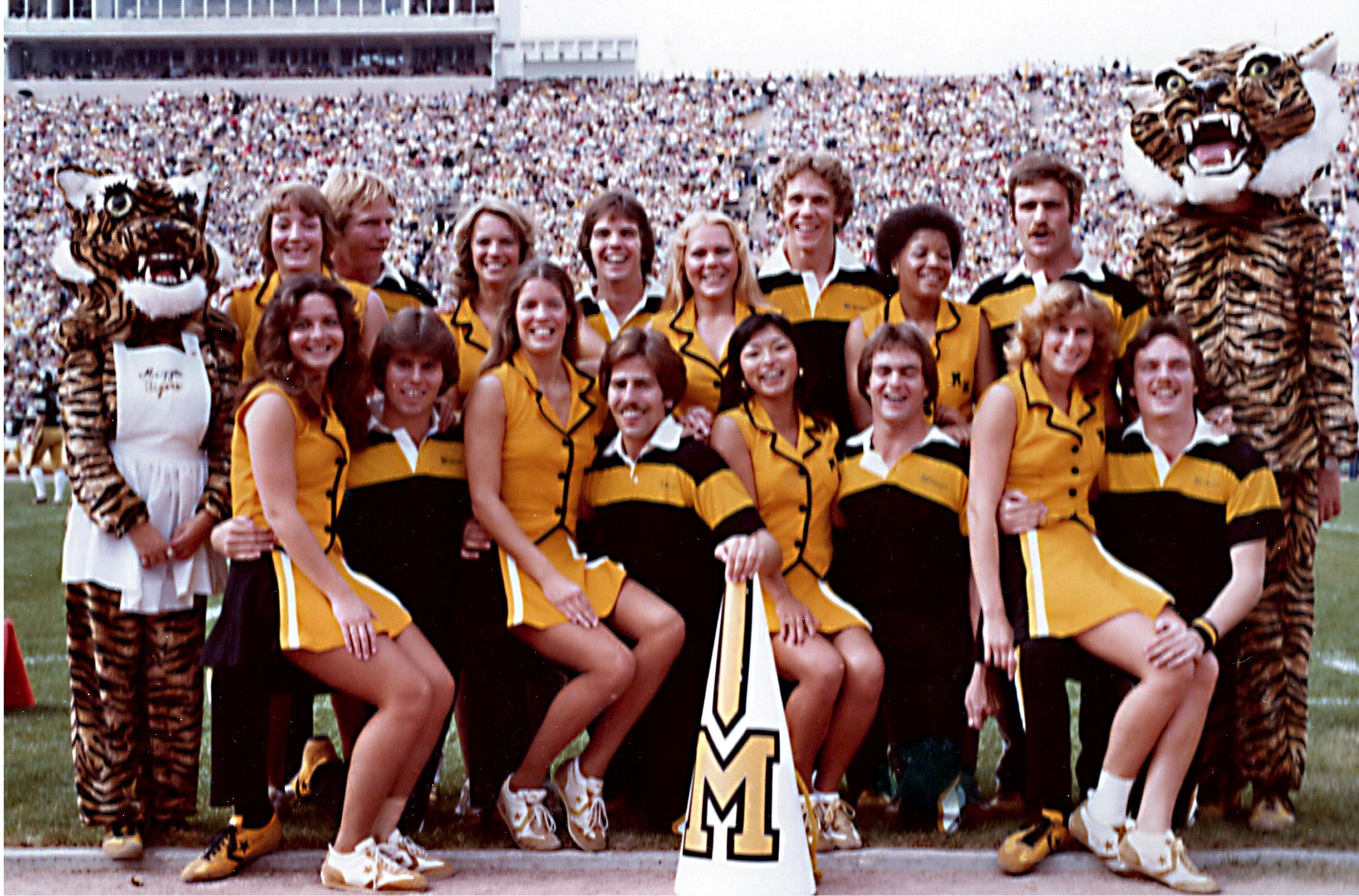
Mizzou Cheerleaders group photo on the sidelines of Faurot Field in 1977. Mizzou Cheerlearders originated and implemented the famous MIZ / ZOU chant in 1976, now part of Mizzou legend.

=== Homecoming ===
The University of Missouri claims to be the originator of the tradition of homecoming. Before, games against the University of Kansas were played in Kansas City. However, a change in conference regulations required intercollegiate football games to be played on campus starting in 1911. Fearing that game attendance would be low, the new Missouri coach, C. L. Brewer, appealed with great success for the "Old Grads" to "Come Back Home" to boost attendance and help dedicate MU's new football field. The fans responded, swelling the crowd at Rollins Field in Columbia to more than ten thousand. MU, Trivial Pursuit, and Jeopardy! all say that this game in 1911 was the first homecoming game, despite competing claims from other schools.

The 2010 edition of the University of Missouri Homecoming also included the first ever visit by ESPN College GameDay. 18,000 fans attended College GameDay at the Francis Quadrangle on Saturday, October 23, 2010. The turnout broke the previous largest crowd of 15,800 fans set at the University of Nebraska in 2001, a record that would stand until 2023.

=== Big MO ===
Big MO is a 6-foot, 150-pound bass drum featured at Mizzou football games. Big MO's handlers are actually University of Missouri alumni rather than student members of Marching Mizzou. Big MO is used to lead fans in the traditional MIZ-ZOU cheer. The drum has been a Mizzou football tradition since 1981, when it was acquired by a Mizzou athletic booster club known as the St. Louis Quarterback Club. The club donated $5,000 to purchase the drum, which was built by Ludwig Drums in Chicago. The drum, originally painted red with gold flakes, was brought back from Chicago strapped in the back of a pickup truck. When it arrived in Columbia, the drum was repainted black and presented to the university a week before the first 1981 football game at an event known as the Tiger Fall Rally. Responsibility for Big MO was transferred to the Mizzou chapters of Kappa Kappa Psi and Tau Beta Sigma in 1993. Only student and alumni members of the two organizations are eligible to be on the Big MO crew. Big MO is the third largest bass drum in the United States, behind Big Bertha at the University of Texas and the Purdue Big Bass Drum.

In April 2011, the Mizzou chapters of Kappa Kappa Psi and Tau Beta Sigma kicked off a fundraising campaign to replace Big MO, which deteriorated over several decades of use. The current Big MO weighs 800-plus-pounds and has a 9-foot diameter and a 54-inch width, making it one of the largest collegiate bass drums. The new drum was built by Neil Boumpani of Boumpani Music Company, a custom drum maker in Barnesville, Georgia. The new Big MO debuted when Mizzou entered play in the Southeastern Conference in 2012.

=== Harpo's goal post tradition ===
Since 1971, there has been no doubt about the destination of the goal posts any time they have been torn down following a home football game. 1971 marked the first year in which the goal posts ended up at Harpo's Bar and Grill at 29 S. Tenth Street in Columbia. Although no concrete reasoning is known behind the tradition, it is suggested that Harpo's became the destination because of its popularity among alumni returning to Columbia on game days and because the restaurant is one of the few places that had remained under consistent ownership without any name changes, so alumni and students all easily identify with the establishment. Following the 2005 season, removable goal posts were installed, which are lowered at the close of each home game.

In 2010 the goal post tradition was revived following the victory against BCS #1 ranked Oklahoma. Thousands of fans began to swarm the field before the final play had even ended. Although there were event staff and highway patrol encircling the field, security was unable to prevent fans from storming the field and removing the north end zone goal post from the stadium.

=== Alma mater ===
The Alma Mater for the University of Missouri is Old Missouri. It was written in 1895 and is sung to the tune of Annie Lisle and has two verses. Before and after athletic events, sometimes only the first verse is used. The first and second verses are more commonly sung at student orientation and at commencement/graduation ceremonies. Both verses are followed by the chorus.

=== M-I-Z Z-O-U Chant ===
The M-I-Z / Z-O-U chant is the official call-and-response cheer of the University of Missouri (commonly known as Mizzou). It is one of the university's traditions, serving as a rally cry among students, alumni, and fans.

==== Origin ====
The chant originated in the mid-1970s, when members of the Missouri cheerleading squad and Marching Mizzou sought to develop a distinctive cheer that incorporated the school's nickname, “Mizzou.” According to Show Me Mizzou magazine, the idea emerged in 1976 during a post-game bus ride after Missouri's football victory over Ohio State University. A Marching Mizzou member, Cedric Lemme, suggested dividing “Mizzou” into two syllables — “M-I-Z” and “Z-O-U” — to create a responsive chant. Cheerleader Jess Bushyhead, a 1978 graduate, helped popularize the cheer and successfully promoted the use of “Mizzou” on uniforms and spirit signs, reinforcing the nickname's association with the university's identity.

==== Adoption and Legacy ====
Initially, the chant took time to gain traction at athletic events, but it soon became a defining feature of Faurot Field football games and other university gatherings. Today, it is a central part of Mizzou's athletic and cultural traditions. The cheer is typically initiated by the east side of Faurot Field (the side with the student section) shouting “M-I-Z,” with the opposing side responding “Z-O-U.” It is also used informally among alumni and supporters—one person may call out “M-I-Z” in public, and another will often answer “Z-O-U.”

Bushyhead later reflected that “there's no place in the state you can go and just randomly yell ‘M-I-Z’ and someone won't answer ‘Z-O-U,’” describing the chant as a lasting symbol of Tiger pride and community.

== Championships ==
=== National Championships ===
Missouri has won 2 NCAA team national championships.

- Men's (2)
  - Baseball (1): 1954
  - Indoor Track & Field (1): 1965

In addition, Missouri also claims one national championship for FBS football.

- Football: 1 (1960)
- see also
  - SEC NCAA team championships
  - List of NCAA schools with the most NCAA Division I championships

=== NCAA individual championships ===
Karissa Schweizer (six championships):

- 2018 NCAA Outdoor National Champion (5000m Run)
- 2018 NCAA Indoor National Champion (3000m Run)
- 2018 NCAA Indoor National Champion (5000m Run)
- 2017 NCAA Outdoor National Champion (5000m Run)
- 2017 NCAA Indoor National Champion (5000m Run)
- 2016 NCAA Cross Country National Champion

Ben Askren (two Championships)

- 2006 NCAA Wrestling National Champion (174 lbs.)
- 2007 NCAA Wrestling National Champion (174 lbs.)
- 2x Dan Hodge Trophy winner

Natasha Kaiser-Brown

- 1989 NCAA Indoor Track and Field National Champion (400m Run)

Derrick Peterson

- 1999 NCAA Outdoor Track and Field National Champion (800m Run)

Mark Ellis

- 2009 NCAA Wrestling National Champion (285 lbs.)

Max Askren

- 2010 NCAA Wrestling National Champion (184 lbs.)

J'den Cox (Three Championships)

- 2014 NCAA Wrestling National Champion (197 lbs.)
- 2016 NCAA Wrestling National Champion (197 lbs.)
- 2017 NCAA Wrestling National Champion (197 lbs.)

Drake Houdashelt

- 2015 NCAA Wrestling National Champion (149 lbs.)

Keegan O’Toole

- 2022 NCAA Wrestling National Champion (165 lbs.)
- 2023 NCAA Wrestling National Champion (165 lbs.)

Helen Hu

- 2025 NCAA Gymnastics National Champion (Balance Beam)

=== NCA National College Cheer Team Championships ===
- 2023 - Intermediate Large Coed
- 2024 - Intermediate Large Coed

=== Conference championships ===
==== Western Interstate University Football Association ====
Football

- 1893
- 1894
- 1895

==== Missouri Valley ====
Basketball

- 1918
- 1920
- 1921
- 1922

Football

- 1909
- 1913
- 1919
- 1924
- 1925
- 1927

Track and field

- 1911
- 1912
- 1913
- 1915
- 1916
- 1917
- 1918
- 1920
- 1925

==== Big Six ====
Baseball

- 1930
- 1931
- 1937
- 1938
- 1941
- 1942

Basketball

- 1930
- 1939
- 1940

Cross country

- 1929

Football

- 1939
- 1941
- 1942
- 1945

Track and field

- 1938
- 1943
- 1947

==== Big Seven ====
Baseball

- 1952

Track and field

- 1948
- 1949
- 1951

==== Big Eight ====
Baseball

- 1958
- 1962
- 1963
- 1964
- 1965
- 1976
- 1980
- 1996 (Regular Season)

Cross country

- 1967
- 1974
- 1980 (Women's)
- 1984 (Women's)

Football

- 1960
- 1969

Basketball

- 1976
- 1978 (Tournament)
- 1980
- 1981
- 1982 (Regular Season and Tournament)
- 1983
- 1987 (Regular Season and Tournament)
- 1989 (Tournament)
- 1990
- 1993 (Tournament)
- 1994

==== Big 12 ====
Baseball

- 2012 (Tournament)

Basketball

- 2009 (Tournament)
- 2012 (Tournament)

Soccer

- 2008 (Tournament)
- 2009

Softball

- 1997 (Regular Season and Tournament)
- 2009 (Tournament)
- 2011

Wrestling

- 2012
- 2022
- 2023

==== Mid-American ====
Wrestling

- 2013 (Tournament)
- 2014 (Tournament)
- 2015 (Regular Season and Tournament)
- 2016 (Regular Season and Tournament)
- 2017 (Tournament)
- 2018 (Regular Season and Tournament)
- 2019 (Regular Season and Tournament)
- 2020 (Regular Season and Tournament)
- 2021 (Tournament)

==== SEC ====
Volleyball

- 2013
- 2016

== Notable athletes ==
- Danario Alexander, wide receiver who led the nation in receiving yards and TDs his senior season, played for the Los Angeles Chargers
- John Anderson, former high jumper, now an anchor on ESPN SportsCenter
- Ben Askren, Missouri's first individual wrestling national champion (2-Time), 2x Hodge Trophy Award Winner (College wrestler of the year), 2007 ESPY-nominated Best College Male Athlete, 2008 Freestyle Wrestling Olympian, former Bellator MMA Welterweight Champion and ONE Championship Welterweight champion
- Phil Bradley, standout football and baseball player who became an All-Star outfielder for the Seattle Mariners
- John Brown, standout basketball player who played professionally for the Chicago Bulls
- Christian Cantwell, former thrower on track team, current world-class shot putter, 2004 and 2008 IAAF World Indoor Champion, 2008 Summer Olympics silver medalist
- Lloyd Carr, former football player and former head coach at the University of Michigan
- Michael Chandler, 2009 NCAA Wrestling All-American (5th place 157 lbs.), current Mixed Martial Artist, former Bellator Lightweight Champion, now signed to the UFC
- J'den Cox, 3 time NCAA National wrestling champion and 4 time All-American between 2014 and 2017, bronze medalist at 2016 Rio Olympics
- Aaron Crow, former pitcher for the Kansas City Royals from 2011 to 2014, drafted 12th overall in 2009 MLB draft
- Chase Daniel, former Missouri quarterback was a Heisman finalist in 2007, Daniel led the Tigers to two Big 12 North Division titles and Cotton Bowl and Alamo Bowl Championships, was a member of the New Orleans Saints Super Bowl Championship team in 2009, currently with the Los Angeles Chargers
- Pete Fairbanks, pitcher for the Tampa Bay Rays, played in the 2020 World Series
- Justin Gage, record setting wide receiver at Mizzou, formerly played for the Chicago Bears and Tennessee Titans
- Tony Galbreath, former NFL running back with the New Orleans Saints, Minnesota Vikings, and New York Giants, where he was a part of the 1986 Super Bowl XXI Championship team
- Brad Imes, former Missouri offensive tackle, current professional mixed martial artists competing in the UFC, WEC, and most recently King of the Cage
- Natasha Kaiser-Brown, NCAA Indoor Track and Field National Champion, 6x All American sprinter, 2x Olympian 1992 and 1996, Olympic Silver Medalist 1992 4 × 400 m Relay, World Championship 400m Silver and 4 × 400 m Relay Gold Medalist, MVP of the Big 8 Conference 1989, Missouri Hall of Fame. Kaiser-Brown is a member of the current World Championship 4 × 400 m Relay record of 3:16.71 (Torrence, Malone, Kaiser, Miles)
- John Kelly, low amateur at the 2007 Masters Tournament
- Ian Kinsler, former MLB second baseman from 2006 to 2019, 4x All-Star, 2x Gold Glove winner
- Linas Kleiza, former NBA player for the Toronto Raptors, now plays in Turkey
- Jim Leavitt, former football player and defensive coordinator at Florida Atlantic University
- Jeremy Maclin, former NFL player from 2009 to 2018
- Bill McCartney, former head football coach at University of Colorado
- William Moore, retired Pro Bowl safety
- Anthony Peeler, former NBA player from 1992 to 2005
- Derrick Peterson, 2004 USA Olympian, 9x Big 12 Conference Champion middle-distance runner-800m, Only athlete to win event from freshman to senior year, 2x NCAA national champion(800m), former American Collegiate Recorder holder(indoor- 800m)
- Shane Ray, former linebacker for the Denver Broncos, played for Denver in 2016 Super Bowl 50 Championship
- Kareem Rush, currently playing for the Los Angeles D-Fenders of the NBA D-League
- Michael Sam, first openly gay player to be drafted in the NFL draft
- Max Scherzer, pitcher for the Washington Nationals, 3-time Cy Young Award winner, played on 2019 World Series-winning Nationals team
- Karissa Schweizer, cross country and track and field runner, won six individual national championships for Mizzou, the first women's NCAA Cross Country National Champion in program history and the most decorated athlete in Missouri Tiger history
- Aldon Smith, former All-Pro NFL linebacker (2011–2021)
- Brad Smith, NCAA record-holder as a dual-threat quarterback, then from 2006 to 2014 a wide receiver/kick returner in the NFL
- Doug Smith, former NBA player from 1991 to 1996
- Justin Smith, 4x Pro Bowler defensive end for the San Francisco 49ers
- Gene Snitsky, former Missouri football player, now WWE wrestler
- Sean Weatherspoon, former 1st round draft pick and former player for the Atlanta Falcons
- Roger Wehrli, Pro Football Hall of Fame 2007 inductee
- Kellen Winslow, former Missouri football player now in College and Pro Hall of Fame
- Tyron Woodley, former 2x Missouri wrestling All-American, former UFC welterweight champion

== Tiger media ==
The Tiger Radio Network is anchored by KMBZ in Kansas City, KTGR AM/KCMQ FM in Columbia and Jefferson City, and KTRS in St Louis. Mike Kelly is the commentator for both sports, with Howard Richards and Chris Gervino serving as analysts for football and Gary Link filling in for basketball. In addition, the school owns and operates its own NBC affiliate, KOMU-TV, in Columbia. The station is run by MU faculty members and is staffed by professionals and students. It's the only college-owned and operated network affiliate in the country.

For indoor sports, Mizzou operates the Missouri Sports Network, a syndication package that airs on FSN Midwest and/or Metro Sports. It mainly broadcasts volleyball and basketball. Dan McLaughlin handles play-by-play for all sports, and is joined by a rotating group of color commentators, most notably Tigers coaching legend Norm Stewart for men's basketball games.

== Mizzou Athletics Hall of Fame ==
The University of Missouri Intercollegiate Athletics Hall of Fame, located at Mizzou Arena, is a museum operated by the University of Missouri and is the highest honor bestowed upon a Mizzou student-athlete, coach or administrator. The University of Missouri Intercollegiate Athletics Hall of Fame was made possible by the 1989 bequest of $100,000 from the estate of the late A.C. (Ace) and Mary Stotler. Its purpose is "to recognize and honor those individuals who have made exceptional contributions to the achievements and prestige of the University of Missouri in the field of athletics, and who have continued to demonstrate in their lives, the values imparted by intercollegiate athletics."

Athletes are not eligible for consideration until five years after completion of their competitive career. Coaches and staff members must have spent at least five years working at the University of Missouri and are also subject to a five-year waiting period. The induction ceremony typically occurs in the February following the induction year.

== See also ==
- "Fifth Down" (The infamous "5th" down during the 1990 Colorado-Missouri football game)
- Marching Mizzou
- List of college athletic programs in Missouri
