= Roch Cholowsky =

American baseball player (born 2005)

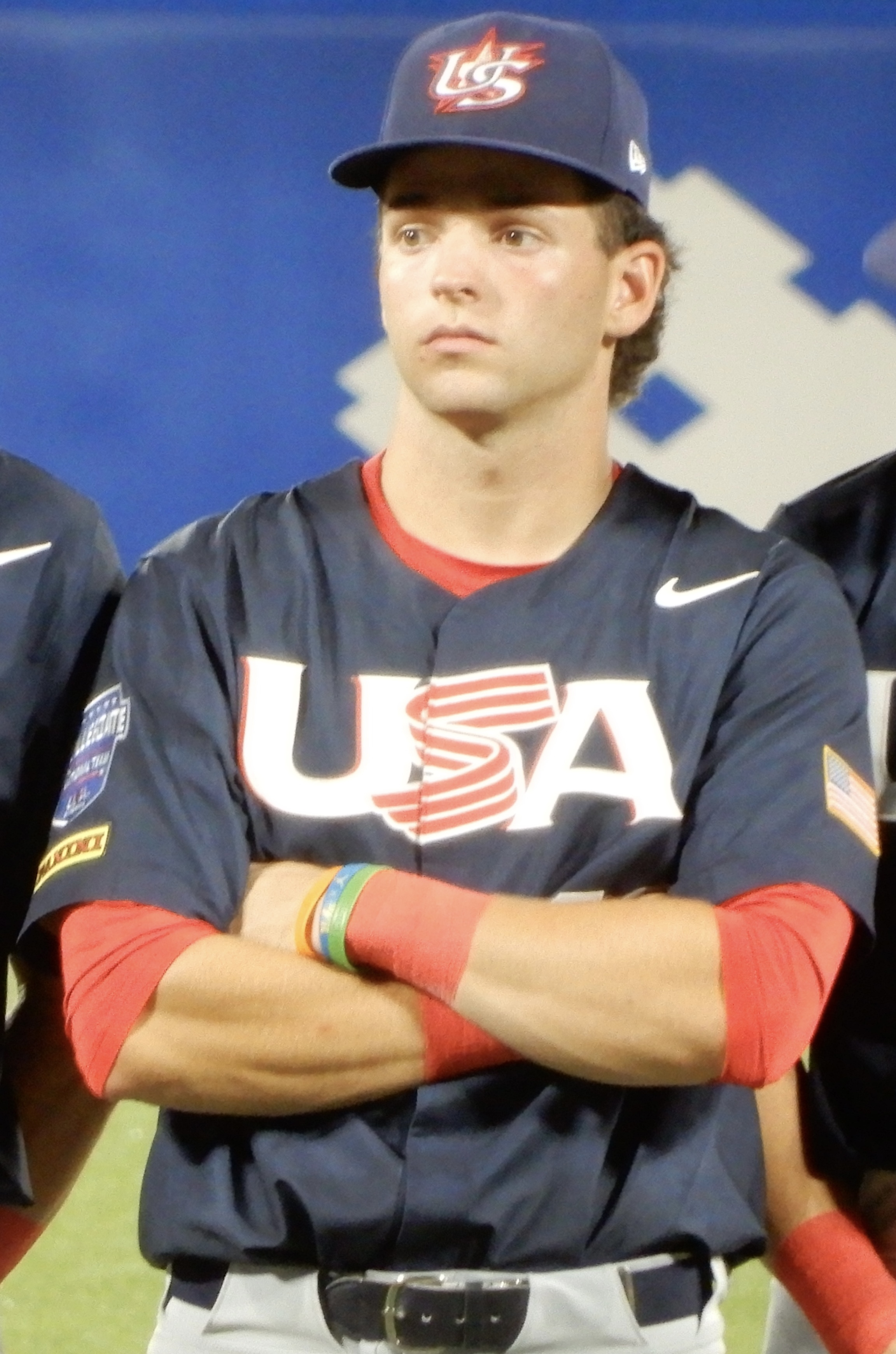
- Cholowsky with the United States national baseball team in 2025

Chicago White Sox
- Infielder
- Born: April 7, 2005 (age 21); Vallejo, California, U.S.
- Bats: Right Throws: Right
- Stats at Baseball Reference

Daniel Roch Cholowsky (/rɒk tʃəˈlaʊski/; born April 7, 2005) is an American baseball infielder in the Chicago White Sox organization. He played college baseball for the UCLA Bruins and was drafted first overall by the White Sox in the 2026 MLB draft.

== Early life ==
Cholowsky was born in Vallejo, California, to Daniel and Tika Cholowsky, and the family later relocated to Chandler, Arizona, when Cholowsky was a child. His father played collegiate baseball at the University of California, Berkeley and was chosen 39th overall in the 1991 MLB draft by the St. Louis Cardinals organization. His father reached as high as Triple-A, and became a Cincinnati Reds scout following his baseball career. Cholowsky is of one-quarter Indian descent.

== Amateur career ==
Cholowsky attended Hamilton High School in Chandler where he played at the varsity level for the baseball and football teams and was considered a top prospect in both sports.

On the football field, Cholowsky was the backup quarterback for Nicco Marcio, and began starting as a senior. After playing four games in which he helped lead the team to a 3-1 record, he suffered a torn meniscus which sidelined him for the rest of his senior season. Cholowsky was considered a three-star recruit as a quarterback and was ranked the 84th best quarterback in the country and 24th best player overall in Arizona. He received offers from New Mexico State University and the University of Notre Dame.

For the baseball team, Cholowsky played as a shortstop and pitcher. As a junior for Hamilton in 2022, he hit .315 with two home runs. As a senior in 2023, he batted .466 with 11 home runs and 35 runs batted in (RBI) and was named the Gatorade Arizona Baseball Player of the Year. He was considered a top prospect for the 2023 Major League Baseball draft, but went unselected and ultimately enrolled at UCLA to play college baseball.

== College career ==
As a freshman at UCLA in 2024, Cholowsky played in 52 games and hit .308 with eight home runs and 33 RBI. After the season, he played in the Cape Cod Baseball League with the Orleans Firebirds.

As a sophomore in 2025, Cholowsky was named the Big Ten Conference Baseball Player of the Year, Big Ten Conference Defensive Player of the Year, and helped lead UCLA to their first College World Series in 12 years. He also was awarded the Brooks Wallace Award, given annually to the nation's best college shortstop, as well as being awarded the Baseball America College Player of the Year Award. Cholowsky finished the season with a .353 batting average, 23 home runs, and 74 RBI over 66 games and earned first team All-American honors from Baseball America. After the season, he was named to the United States national baseball team.

As a junior in 2026, Cholowsky hit .320 with 21 home runs and 60 RBI across 60 games, his season ending with UCLA being eliminated by Saint Mary's in the NCAA Los Angeles Regional. He was named the Big Ten Conference Baseball Player of the Year for the second consecutive season. He was also one of three finalists for the Golden Spikes Award alongside Landon Hairston and winner Daniel Jackson. After the season, he was invited to attend the 2026 MLB Draft Combine at Chase Field.

== Professional career ==
Cholowsky was considered a consensus top three prospect for the 2026 Major League Baseball draft, with many evaluators viewing him as the top prospect in the class. He was selected by the Chicago White Sox with the first overall pick in the draft. Cholowsky had visited Chicago the month prior and met with White Sox owner Jerry Reinsdorf, general manager Chris Getz, and director of hitting Ryan Fuller, alongside spending time in the White Sox club house and walking the streets of the city. Following his selection in the draft, Cholowsky said "I left the next morning and called my agent and told him that’s where I want to be and he’s got to do whatever he can to make it work. I know that’s where I want to be, and I hope you guys feel the same way about me" and that he "fell in love with the city." He additionally stated "I got really attached. I would have been upset if it didn't work out." On July 13, 2026, Cholowsky signed with the White Sox for a $10.35 million signing bonus setting a record for largest signing bonus in MLB draft history.

Cholowsky was assigned to the High-A Winston-Salem Dash to make his professional debut. He played in nine games for the team and hit .167 with one home run, ten RBI, and three stolen bases. On August 22, the White Sox announced that Cholowsky would not play the rest of the season due to right wrist soreness.
