= Baseball America College Player of the Year Award =

Annual collegiate baseball award

- Awarded for: Best player in college baseball
- Country: United States
- Presented by: Baseball America

History
- First award: 1981
- Most recent: Landon Hairston, Arizona State
- Website: Baseball America Awards

The Baseball America College Player of the Year Award is an award given by Baseball America to the best college baseball player of the year. The award has been given annually since 1981. For the first 8 years of the award, a separate position player and pitcher were recognized; however, Baseball America combined them into a single Player of the Year award from 1989-2024. In 2025, Baseball America named LSU pitcher Kade Anderson as the winner of the inaugural College Pitcher of the Year Award after 36 years of having a combined award.

== Winners ==
Key
Year	Links to the article about the corresponding baseball year
Player (X)	Name of the player and number of times they had won the award at that point
Position	The player's position at the time he won the award
School	The player's college when he won the award
Italics	Denotes player was the first overall MLB draft pick in the same year
^	Player won the Rookie of the Year Award (Note: Won either in the same year or several years later.)
§	Denotes player also won the Golden Spikes Award or Dick Howser Trophy in the same year
†	Member of the National College Baseball Hall of Fame
‡	Player is active

Player of the Year
Year	Player	Position	School	Ref
1981	Mike Sodders	3B	Arizona State	
1982	Jeff Ledbetter	OF/P	Florida State	
1983	Dave Magadan^{†}^{§}	3B	Alabama	
1984	Oddibe McDowell^{†}^{§}	OF	Arizona State	
1985	Pete Incaviglia^{†}	OF	Oklahoma State	
1986	Casey Close	OF	Michigan	
1987	Robin Ventura^{†}	3B	Oklahoma State	
1988	John Olerud^{†}	1B/P	Washington State	

Pitcher of the Year
Year	Player	Position	School	Ref
1981	Neal Heaton^{†}	P	Miami (FL)	
1982	Bryan Oelkers	P	Wichita State	
1983	Calvin Schiraldi	P	Texas	
1984	John Hoover	P	Fresno State	
1985	Greg Swindell^{†}	P	Texas	
1986	Mike Loynd^{§}	P	Florida State	
1987	Derek Lilliquist	P	Georgia	
1988	Andy Benes	P	Evansville	

Combined Award
Year	Player	Position	School	Ref
1989	Ben McDonald^{†}^{§}	P	Louisiana State	
1990	Mike Kelly	OF	Arizona State	
1991	Dave McCarty	1B	Stanford	
1992	Phil Nevin^{§}	3B	Cal State Fullerton	
1993	Brooks Kieschnick^{†}^{§}	DH/P	Texas	
1994	Jason Varitek^{§}	C	Georgia Tech	
1995	Todd Helton	1B/P	Tennessee	
1996	Kris Benson^{§}	P	Clemson	
1997	J. D. Drew^{§}	OF	Florida State	
1998	Jeff Austin	P	Stanford	
1999	Jason Jennings^{§}^{^}	P	Baylor	
2000	Mark Teixeira^{§}	3B	Georgia Tech	
2001	Mark Prior^{§}	P	Southern California	
2002	Khalil Greene^{§}	SS	Clemson	
2003	Rickie Weeks^{§}	2B	Southern	
2004	Jered Weaver^{§}	P	Long Beach State	
2005	Alex Gordon^{§}	3B	Nebraska	
2006	Andrew Miller	P	North Carolina	
2007	David Price^{§}	P	Vanderbilt	
2008	Buster Posey^{‡}^{§}^{^}	C	Florida State	
2009	Stephen Strasburg^{§}	P	San Diego State	
2010	Anthony Rendon^{‡}^{§}	3B	Rice	
2011	Trevor Bauer^{‡}^{§}	P	UCLA	
2012	Mike Zunino^{§}	C	Florida	
2013	Kris Bryant^{‡}^{§}	3B	San Diego	
2014	A. J. Reed^{‡}^{§}	1B/P	Kentucky	
2015	Andrew Benintendi^{‡}^{§}	OF	Arkansas	
2016	Kyle Lewis^{§}^{^}	OF	Mercer	
2017	Brendan McKay^{§}	1B/P	Louisville	
2018	Brady Singer^{‡}^{§}	P	Florida	
2019	Adley Rutschman^{‡}^{§}	C	Oregon State	
2020	Not awarded (Note: Due to the COVID-19 pandemic)	—	—	
2021	Kevin Kopps^{‡}^{§}	P	Arkansas	
2022	Ivan Melendez^{‡}^{§}	1B	Texas	
2023	Paul Skenes^{‡}^{§}^{^}	P	Louisiana State	
2024	Charlie Condon^{‡}^{§}	1B/OF	Georgia	

Player of the Year
Year	Player	Position	School	Ref
2025	Roch Cholowsky	INF	UCLA	
2026	Landon Hairston	INF	Arizona State	

Pitcher of the Year
Year	Player	Position	School	Ref
2025	Kade Anderson	P	LSU	
2026	Mason Edwards	P	USC	

== See also ==
- List of college baseball awards
- Baseball awards#U.S. college baseball
- College Baseball Hall of Fame
