= Kerrick Jackson =

American baseball coach

Current position
- Title: Head coach
- Team: Missouri
- Conference: SEC
- Record: 63-102

Playing career
- 1994–1995: St. Louis Community College
- 1996: Bethune–Cookman
- 1997: Nebraska
- Position: Pitcher

Coaching career (HC unless noted)
- 2001: Fairfield (asst)
- 2002: Emporia State (asst)
- 2003: Coffeyville CC (asst)
- 2004–2005: Jefferson College (MO) (asst)
- 2006–2007: Nicholls State (asst)
- 2008: St. Louis CC (asst)
- 2011–2015: Missouri (asst)
- 2018–2020: Southern
- 2023: Memphis
- 2024–present: Missouri

Head coaching record
- Overall: 139–197
- Tournaments: NCAA: 0–2

Accomplishments and honors

Championships
- SWAC West Division (2019); SWAC Tournament (2019)

Awards
- SWAC Coach of the Year (2019)

Kerrick Jackson is an American baseball coach and former pitcher, who is the current head baseball coach of the Missouri Tigers. He played college baseball at St. Louis Community College, Bethune–Cookman and Nebraska from 1994 to 1997. He then served as the head coach of the Southern Jaguars (2018–2020) and the Memphis Tigers (2023). He also served as the president of the MLB Draft League in 2021.

== Amateur career ==
Jackson attended Kirkwood High School in Kirkwood, Missouri. He played on both the baseball and basketball teams. Upon graduation, Jackson enrolled at St. Louis Community College. After graduating from STLCC, Jackson accepted a baseball scholarship offer from Bethune–Cookman University. Jackson then transferred to play for the Nebraska Cornhuskers baseball program as a senior.

== Coaching career ==
Jackson's first college coaching job came as an assistant for the Fairfield Stags baseball program in 2001. The next season, Jackson became an assistant coach at Emporia State University. Jackson spent the 2003 season as an assistant at Coffeyville Community College before moving on to Jefferson College for the 2004 and 2005 seasons. Jackson coached at Nicholls State University from 2006 to 2007 and St. Louis Community College in 2008. In 2007, he was assistant coach of the Falmouth Commodores, a collegiate summer baseball team in the Cape Cod Baseball League.

Jackson left college baseball to become a professional scout for the Washington Nationals from 2008 to 2010.

On August 14, 2010, Jackson was named the recruiting coordinator and assistant coach for the Missouri Tigers baseball program under coach Tim Jamieson. On May 27, 2015, Jackson left his position with Missouri because of his wife's promotion. Jackson spent his two year hiatus from coaching as an agent.

On July 25, 2017, Jackson returned to coaching as the head coach of the Southern Jaguars baseball team.

In 2019, Coach Jackson led the Southern Jaguars baseball team to the SWAC Baseball Tournament championship and a berth in the 2019 NCAA Baseball Tournament. Southern was eliminated after losses to the Mississippi State University Bulldogs in their first game, 11-6, and the University of Miami Hurricanes, 12-2, in the losers bracket elimination game on the following day. On November 30, 2020, Jackson resigned as head coach of the Southern Jaguars to accept a position as the President of MLB Draft League.

After just a year with the MLB Draft League, Jackson returned to coaching collegiate baseball, being named the head coach of the Memphis Tigers.

On June 3, 2023, Jackson was hired by the Missouri Tigers to become their head baseball coach.

== Head coaching record ==
Record table
Season	Team	Overall	Conference	Standing	Postseason
Southern Jaguars (Southwestern Athletic Conference) (2018–2020)
2018	Southern	9–33	6–15	5th (West)	
2019	Southern	32–24	17–6	1st (West)	NCAA Regional
2020	Southern	6–10	3–0	(West)	Season canceled due to COVID-19
Southern:		47–67	26–21		
Memphis Tigers (American Athletic Conference) (2023)
2023	Memphis	29–28	10–14	T-5th	
Memphis:		29–28	10–14		
Missouri Tigers (Southeastern Conference) (2024–present)
2024	Missouri	23–32	9–21	7th (East)	
2025	Missouri	16–39	3–27	16th	
2026	Missouri	24–31	6–24	16th	
Missouri:		63–102	18–72		
Total:		139–197			
National champion Postseason invitational champion Conference regular season champion Conference regular season and conference tournament champion Division regular season champion Division regular season and conference tournament champion Conference tournament champion

== See also ==
- List of current NCAA Division I baseball coaches
