= Big 12 Conference Baseball Player of the Year =

Big 12 Player of the Year
- Awarded for: the most outstanding baseball player in the Big 12 Conference
- Country: United States
- Presented by: Phillips 66
- First award: 1997
- Currently held by: Landon Hairston, Arizona State

The Big 12 Conference Player of the Year is a baseball award given to the Big 12 Conference's most outstanding player. The award was first given following the 1997 season, with both pitchers and position players eligible. After the 2001 season, the Big 12 Conference Baseball Pitcher of the Year award was created to honor the most outstanding pitcher. It is selected by the league's head coaches, who are not allowed to vote for their own players.

== Key ==
| † | Co-Players of the Year |
| * | Awarded a national Player of the Year award: the Dick Howser Trophy or the Golden Spikes Award |
| Player (X) | Denotes the number of times the player had been awarded the Player of the Year award at that point |

== Winners ==
| Season | Player | School | Position | Class | Reference |
|---|---|---|---|---|---|
| 1997 | Joe Dillon | Texas Tech | 1B | Senior | |
| 1998^{†} | Jason Jennings | Baylor | P | Sophomore | |
| 1998^{†} | Jason Tyner | Texas A&M | OF | Junior | |
| 1999 | Jason Jennings*(2) | Baylor | P/DH | Junior | |
| 2000 | Shane Komine | Nebraska | P | Sophomore | |
| 2001 | Kelly Shoppach | Baylor | C | Sophomore | |
| 2002 | Jed Morris | Nebraska | C | Junior | |
| 2003 | Matt Hopper | Nebraska | IF | Senior | |
| 2004 | Alex Gordon | Nebraska | 3B | Sophomore | |
| 2005 | Alex Gordon*(2) | Nebraska | 3B | Junior | |
| 2006^{†} | Tyler Mach | Oklahoma State | 3B | Junior | |
| 2006^{†} | Drew Stubbs | Texas | OF | Junior | |
| 2007 | Kyle Russell | Texas | OF | Sophomore | |
| 2008 | Jose Duran | Texas A&M | SS | Junior | |
| 2009 | J. T. Wise | Oklahoma | C | Senior | |
| 2010^{†} | Nick Martini | Kansas State | OF | Sophomore | |
| 2010^{†} | Aaron Senne | Missouri | IF | Senior | |
| 2011 | Tyler Naquin | Texas A&M | OF | Sophomore | |
| 2012 | Josh Ludy | Baylor | C | Senior | |
| 2013 | Ross Kivett | Kansas State | IF | Junior | |
| 2014 | Zach Fish | Oklahoma State | OF | Junior | |
| 2015 | Cody Jones | TCU | OF | Senior | |
| 2016 | Eric Gutierrez | Texas Tech | 1B | Senior | |
| 2017^{†} | Hunter Hargrove | Texas Tech | IF | Senior | |
| 2017^{†} | Evan Skoug | TCU | C | Junior | |
| 2018 | Kody Clemens | Texas | IF | Junior | |
| 2019^{†} | Josh Jung | Texas Tech | IF | Junior | |
| 2019^{†} | Davis Wendzel | Baylor | IF | Junior | |
| 2021 | Jace Jung | Texas Tech | IF | Freshman | |
| 2022 | Ivan Melendez | Texas | IF | Junior | |
| 2023 | JJ Wetherholt | West Virginia | IF | Sophomore | |
| 2024 | Max Belyeu | Texas | OF | Sophomore | |
| 2025 | Kerrington Cross | Cincinnati | IF | Senior | |
| 2026 | Landon Hairston | Arizona State | OF | Sophomore | |

== Winners by school ==
Because NCAA baseball is a spring sport, the year of joining is the calendar year before the first season of competition.

| School (year joined) | Winners | Years |
|---|---|---|
| Nebraska (1996)^{a} | 5 | 2000, 2002, 2003, 2004, 2005 |
| Baylor (1996) | 5 | 1998, 1999, 2001, 2012, 2019 |
| Texas (1996)^{d} | 5 | 2006, 2007, 2018, 2022, 2024 |
| Texas Tech (1996) | 5 | 1997, 2016, 2017, 2019, 2021 |
| Texas A&M (1996)^{c} | 3 | 1998, 2008, 2011 |
| Kansas State (1996) | 2 | 2010, 2013 |
| Oklahoma State (1996) | 2 | 2006, 2014 |
| TCU (2012) | 2 | 2016, 2017 |
| Arizona State (2024) | 1 | 2026 |
| Missouri (1996)^{c} | 1 | 2010 |
| Oklahoma (1996) ^{d} | 1 | 2009 |
| West Virginia (2012) | 1 | 2023 |
| Cincinnati (2023) | 1 | 2025 |
| Arizona (2024) | 0 | — |
| BYU (2023) | 0 | — |
| Houston (2023) | 0 | — |
| Iowa State (1996)^{b} | 0 | — |
| Kansas (1996) | 0 | — |
| Utah (2024) | 0 | — |

== Footnotes ==
- ^{a} Nebraska left in 2011 to join the Big Ten.
- ^{b} Iowa State discontinued its baseball program after the 2001 season.
- ^{c} Missouri and Texas A&M left in 2012 to join the SEC.
- ^{d} Oklahoma and Texas left in 2024 to join the SEC.
