= Dave Silvestri =

American baseball player (born 1967)

- Infielder
- Born: September 29, 1967 (age 58); St. Louis, Missouri, U.S.
- Batted: Right Threw: Right

MLB debut
- April 27, 1992, for the New York Yankees

Last MLB appearance
- May 16, 1999, for the Anaheim Angels

MLB statistics
- Batting average: .202
- Home runs: 6
- Runs batted in: 36
- Stats at Baseball Reference

Teams
- New York Yankees (1992–1995); Montreal Expos (1995–1996); Texas Rangers (1997); Tampa Bay Devil Rays (1998); Anaheim Angels (1999)
Medals
Baseball
Representing the United States
Olympic Games
| Gold medal – first place | 1988 Seoul | Team |
Baseball World Cup
| Silver medal – second place | 1988 Rome | Team |
Pan American Games
| Silver medal – second place | 1987 Indianapolis | Team |

David Joseph Silvestri (born September 29, 1967) is an American former infielder in Major League Baseball from 1992 to 1999. He also played for the United States baseball team at the 1988 Summer Olympics.

== Playing career ==
Silvestri attended the University of Missouri, where he played for the Missouri Tigers baseball team. He was drafted by the Houston Astros in the second round of the 1988 Major League Baseball draft. That year, he played internationally for the United States baseball team in the 1988 Baseball World Cup, where he batted .333/.407/.542 with 10 runs as the club's shortstop. He won a silver medal with the team. He also played in the 1988 Seoul Olympics, winning a gold medal.

Before the 1990 season, Silvestri was traded with a player to be named later to the New York Yankees for infielder Orlando Miller. During the 1995 season, he was traded to the Montreal Expos for a minor league player.

== Managing career ==
Silvestri managed the Hudson Valley Renegades of the New York–Penn League in 2000 and the Great Falls Dodgers of the Pioneer League in 2001.
