= Landon Hairston =

American baseball player (born 2006)

Arizona State Sun Devils – No. 3
- Outfielder
- Born: January 13, 2006 (age 20); Gilbert, Arizona, U.S.
- Bats: Left Throws: Left

Career highlights and awards
- Baseball America College Player of the Year Award (2026); Big 12 Player of the Year (2026)

Landon Drake Hairston (born January 13, 2006) is an American college baseball outfielder for the Arizona State Sun Devils.

== Career ==
Hairston attended Casteel High School in Queen Creek, Arizona. During his high school career he had a .390 batting average with eight home runs and 90 runs batted in (RBI). Hairston committed to Arizona State University to play college baseball.

As a freshman at Arizona State in 2025, Hairston played in 54 games and hit .333/.441/.467 with four home runs and 37 RBI. After the season he played in the Cape Cod Baseball League (CCBL) for the Orleans Firebirds.

Hairston returned to Arizona State his sophomore year in 2026 as a starter and became one of the best players in college baseball. He played in 59 games hitting 28 home runs with 81 RBI while slashing a line of .400/.509/.860 with a 1.368 OPS. His 28 home runs set a new Arizona State single-season record. Hairston was named the Big 12 Player of the Year, the Baseball America College Player of the Year, and a finalist for the Golden Spikes Award and Dick Howser Trophy. On June 11th, 2026, Hairston announced he would be returning to Arizona State for his junior season.

== Personal life ==
His father Scott Hairston, uncle Jerry Hairston Jr., grandfather Jerry Hairston Sr. and great-grandfather Sam Hairston all played in Major League Baseball (MLB).
