= Laird Veatch =

American college sports administrator

Current position
- Title: Athletic director
- Team: Missouri
- Conference: SEC

Biographical details
- Born: Manhattan, Kansas, U.S.

Playing career
- 1990–1994: Kansas State

Administrative career (AD unless noted)
- 1995–1997: Texas (GA)
- 1997–2002: Missouri (assistant)
- 2002–2003: Iowa State (associate athletics director)
- 2010–2015: Kansas State (associate athletics director)
- 2015–2017: Kansas State (deputy athletic director)
- 2017: Kansas State (interim athletic director)
- 2017–2019: Florida (associate athletics director)
- 2019–2024: Memphis
- 2024–present: Missouri

Laird Veatch is an American university sports administrator who is currently the athletic director at the University of Missouri. Veatch was previously the athletic director at the University of Memphis.

== Early life ==
Veatch was born in Manhattan, Kansas, where he attended Manhattan High School. While in Manhattan, Veatch played baseball, basketball, football, and track. Veatch attended Kansas State University, where he played football and was a captain for the football team his senior year.

== Career ==
Veatch started his administrator career at the University of Texas, where he assisted with the development program and external affairs while earning his master's degree. In 1997, Veatch began working at the University of Missouri, eventually as the assistant director of development. In his first stint at Missouri, Veatch managed the Tiger Scholarship Fund. After a one-year stint at Iowa State University, Veatch joined Learfield Sports in 2003. Veatch started as general manager of Mizzou Sports Properties before becoming vice president for Learfield in Missouri from 2006 to 2010. Veatch rejoined the collegiate world in 2010 as an associate director for his alma mater, Kansas State. He later became deputy athletic director in 2015 and interim athletic director in 2017 after the previous athletic director, John Currie, left for the University of Tennessee. During his time at Kansas State, Veatch oversaw an $85 million renovation to the west side of Bill Snyder Family Football Stadium and the construction of a $60 million football training complex. In 2017, Veatch joined the University of Florida as an executive associate athletic director. While at Florida, Veatch oversaw renovations for the university's softball stadium, and the construction of both a new baseball stadium and an athletic facility for football.

=== Memphis ===
In 2019, Veatch became the athletic director for the University of Memphis. While at Memphis, Veatch hired Ryan Silverfield as head coach for the Memphis Tigers football team. Additionally, Veatch oversaw the beginning of a $200 million renovation for Simmons Bank Liberty Stadium, which is set to be completed in 2025. Veatch placed importance on securing NIL deals while at Memphis, concerned about the possibilities of players leaving for wealthier programs. One of the deals Veatch helped secure was a $25 million deal with FedEx.

=== Missouri ===
In 2024, Veatch returned to the University of Missouri as athletic director. Veatch hired some of his colleagues at Memphis for positions at Missouri upon his arrival. Veatch listed his goals at Missouri to be "boost revenue without limiting expenses" and to achieve a higher level of financial independence from the SEC along with a larger budget surplus. On May 1, 2026 Mizzou announced a three-year extension to Veatch's contract. In 2025 Veatch lead Mizzou to a record $182 million in revenue and reduced its negative operational balance by 40 percent. Additonally, Veatch oversaw a $250 million dollar project that transformed the north end zone of the football stadium. The renovation is scheduled to completed in time for the 2026 season, adding over 2,000 premium seats, 71 new suites, the field-level Rock M Club, and upgraded concourses to celebrate the stadium's 100-year anniversary.

== Personal life ==
Veatch received his bachelor's degree from Kansas State in 1995 in business administration and his master's degree from Texas in 1997 in sports administration. Veatch is married to his wife, Brandy, and has four children: Jordyn, Taylor, Sydney, and Druzie Veatch.
