= Aaron Crow =

American baseball pitcher (born 1986)

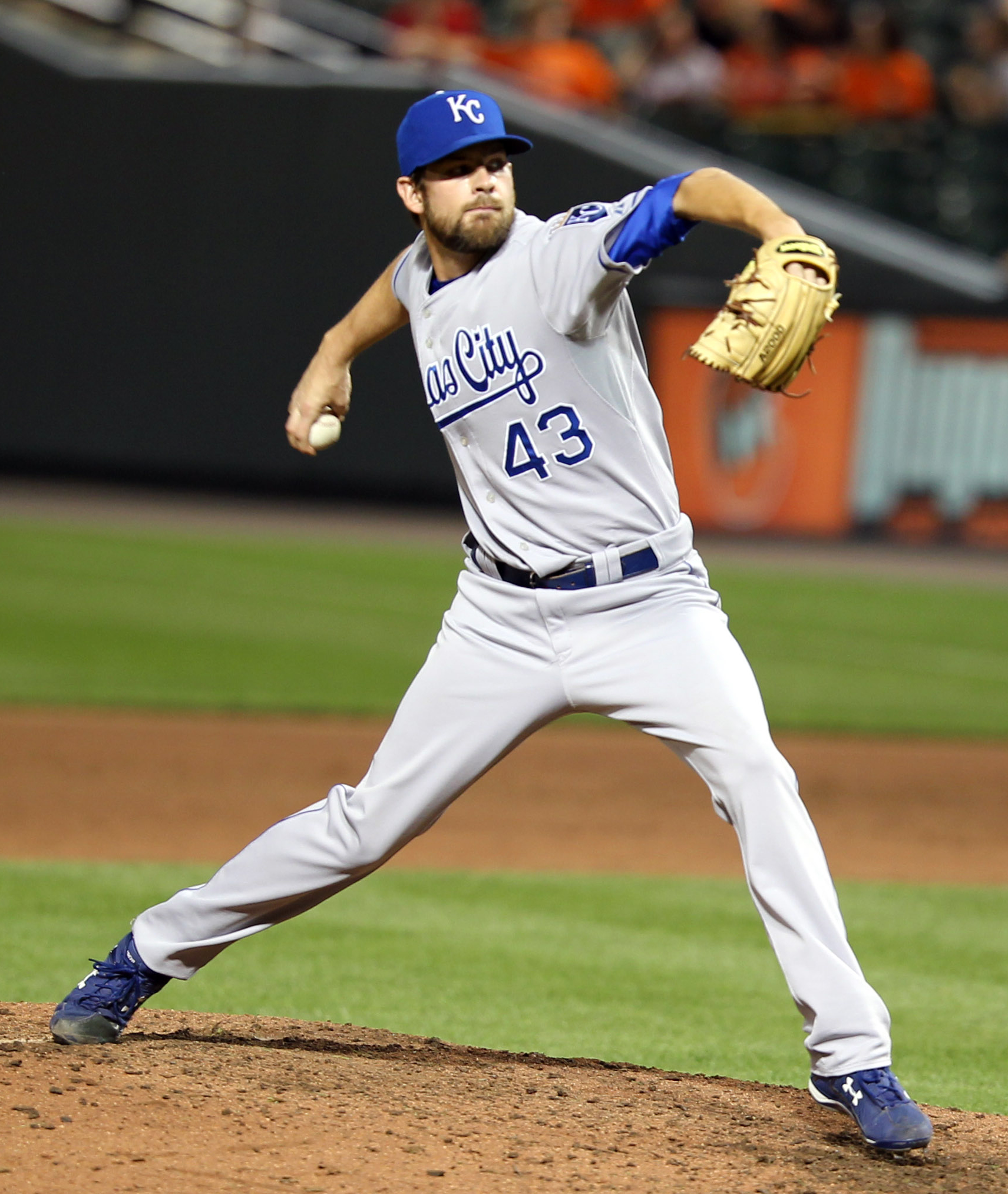
- Crow with the Kansas City Royals
- Pitcher
- Born: November 10, 1986 (age 39); Topeka, Kansas, U.S.
- Batted: Right Threw: Right

MLB debut
- March 31, 2011, for the Kansas City Royals

Last MLB appearance
- September 28, 2014, for the Kansas City Royals

MLB statistics
- Win–loss record: 20–11
- Earned run average: 3.43
- Strikeouts: 208
- Stats at Baseball Reference

Teams
- Kansas City Royals (2011–2014)

Career highlights and awards
- All-Star (2011)

Aaron James Crow (born November 10, 1986) is an American former professional baseball pitcher. He pitched in Major League Baseball (MLB) for the Kansas City Royals.

== Early life ==
Crow was born on November 10, 1986, in Topeka, Kansas to parents Kevin and Julie Crow. Crow and his siblings—brother Travis and sister Jennifer—were raised in the small community of Wakarusa, Kansas, not far from Topeka. Following his graduation from Washburn Rural High School, Crow attended the University of Missouri.

== College career ==
In his three years for the Missouri Tigers baseball team, Crow started 46 games, going 23–8 with a 3.27 earned run average (ERA).

Spending time in both the bullpen and the starting rotation as a freshman, Crow earned his first career victory by throwing a complete game against Pepperdine, staving off elimination in the 2006 NCAA Regional. Mizzou went on to win the regional, becoming the first #4 seed ever to win an NCAA Regional.

As a sophomore, Crow went 9–4 with a 3.60 ERA, earning first-team All Big 12 honors.

As a junior, Crow went 13–0 with a 2.35 ERA. He threw four complete-game shutouts and struck out 10.65 batters per nine innings. He was named the Big 12 Conference Pitcher of the Year.

He won the Robert A. McNeece Award as the top professional prospect in the 2007 Cape Cod Baseball League season while playing for the Falmouth Commodores.

== Professional career ==
Crow was selected by the Washington Nationals in the first round of the 2008 Major League Baseball draft with the ninth overall selection. Negotiations stalled and Crow did not sign. Crow signed with the Fort Worth Cats for the 2009 season.

=== Kansas City Royals ===
Crow was selected with the twelfth pick in the first round of the 2009 Major League Baseball draft by the Kansas City Royals. Crow signed a contract with the Royals on September 15, 2009. To make room for Danny Duffy on the Double A Northwest Arkansas Naturals roster, Crow was demoted to High-A Wilmington on July 31, 2010.

Crow made his first major league appearance on March 31, 2011, which was Opening Day. He faced four Angels batters, striking out three.

On May 30, 2011, Royals manager Ned Yost announced that Crow had been promoted to the team's closer position on a temporary basis to replace the struggling Joakim Soria. However, on June 6, Yost announced that Soria had earned the spot back. Crow had no save opportunities in his brief stint as closer.

In 2011, Crow was selected to the All-Star Game, although he did not play.

=== Miami Marlins ===
On November 28, 2014, the Royals traded Crow to the Miami Marlins in exchange for Brian Flynn and Reid Redman. Crow underwent Tommy John surgery in April 2015 and missed the entirety of the season as a result. He was non–tendered and became a free agent on December 2, 2015.

=== Chicago Cubs ===
On February 19, 2016, Crow signed a minor league contract with the Chicago Cubs organization. He made three appearances for the rookie–level Arizona League Cubs as he continued to recover from surgery. Crow elected free agency following the season on November 7.

=== Acereros de Monclova ===
On May 1, 2018, Crow signed with the Acereros de Monclova of the Mexican League after sitting out the 2017 season. In 13 games for the Acereros, he compiled a 3.55 ERA with 8 strikeouts across 12 2/3 innings pitched. Crow was released by Monclova on July 3.

=== Pericos de Puebla ===
On July 3, 2018, Crow signed with the Pericos de Puebla of the Mexican League. He made six scoreless appearances for Puebla, logging three strikeouts over 6 2/3 innings of work. After the 2018, season, Crow became a free agent and retired from professional baseball.

== Pitching style ==
Crow is a sinkerballer with a heavy sinker at 94–97 mph. His main off-speed pitch, and most-used pitch against right-handed hitters, is a slider at 85–88. He also has a four-seam fastball. Against left-handed hitters, he throws a small amount of curveballs and changeups. The majority of his 2-strike pitches are sliders, owing to its 49% whiff rate.
