= Aaron Senne =

American baseball player (born 1987)

- First baseman
- Born: November 5, 1987 (age 38); Rochester, Minnesota, U.S.
- Bats: Left Throws: Left
- Stats at Baseball Reference

Aaron J. Senne (born November 5, 1987) is an American former professional baseball first baseman who was part of the Miami Marlins organization from 2010 to 2013. He was the Marlins' 10th-round pick in the 2010 MLB draft.

== Amateur career ==
Senne attended Mayo High School in Rochester, Minnesota where he batted .505 with 28 home runs over his career. Senne also went 25–7 as a starting pitcher with a 1.62 ERA and 214 strikeouts. Senne was a three-time All-Conference, All-Region, and All-State selection. Street & Smith named Senne one of the Top 50 junior prospects in the nation. Perfect Game USA rated Senne the #1 recruit in Minnesota and #333 overall recruit in the country.

Following his senior year, he was selected by the Minnesota Twins in the 13th round of the 2006 Major League Baseball draft but chose to attend University of Missouri, where he played for the Missouri Tigers baseball team.

Senne was a four-year starter for Missouri, batting .334 with 42 home runs and 212 RBIs for his career. Senne was named to the All NCAA Regional teams for the Columbia Regional in 2007 and for the Oxford Regional in 2009. He received first team All Big 12 Conference honors in 2008 and 2010 and honorable mention All Big 12 Conference honors in 2009.

After his junior season, Senne was again drafted by the Twins, this time in the 32nd Round of the 2008 Major League Baseball draft. Senne elected to return to Missouri for his senior season where he had a breakout year, batting .400 with 16 home runs and 59 RBIs and leading the Big 12 in OPS. Senne was named the Big 12 Conference Player of the year and was a third-team All-American.

Senne graduated as Missouri's all-time leader in career hits, doubles, extra-base hits and total bases and in the top five in career home runs, RBI, at-bats, slugging percentage and walks lists.

== Professional career ==
Senne was drafted by the Miami Marlins in the 10th round (317th overall) of the 2009 Major League Baseball draft.

In 2010, Senne played first base for the Jamestown Jammers in the New York–Penn League. He missed the entire 2011 season recovering from Tommy John surgery. Senne spent the 2012 season with the Greensboro Grasshoppers of the South Atlantic League, playing first base and left field. Injuries continued to plague his performance in 2012 and throughout 2013, during which he also played for the Jupiter Hammerheads. During Senne's time in Jupiter, he went 2–15 with a .133 batting average. He retired in June 2013.

On February 7, 2014, Senne, along with fellow retired minor league baseball players Michael Liberto and Oliver Odle, filed a class action lawsuit on behalf of all minor league baseball players, alleging violations of state and federal minimum wage laws.
