= 2000 Big 12 Conference baseball tournament =

American college baseball tournament

- Teams: 8
- Format: Double elimination
- Finals site: AT&T Bricktown Ballpark; Oklahoma City, Oklahoma
- Champions: Nebraska (2nd title)
- Winning coach: Dave Van Horn (2nd title)
- MVP: Adam Shabala (Nebraska)
- Attendance: 126,482

2000 Big 12 Conference baseball standings
	Conf.				Overall
Team	W		L	PCT	W		L	PCT
No. 18 Baylor ‍†‍‍^{y}	23	–	7	.767	45	–	17	.726
No. 11 Nebraska ‍‍‡‍^{y}	21	–	9	.700	51	–	17	.750
Oklahoma ‍‍‍^{y}	20	–	10	.667	41	–	23	.641
No. 7 Texas ‍‍‍^{y}	19	–	10	.655	46	–	21	.687
Texas Tech ‍‍‍^{y}	18	–	12	.600	36	–	26	.581
Oklahoma State ‍‍‍	14	–	13	.519	36	–	22	.621
Missouri ‍‍‍	13	–	14	.481	33	–	24	.579
Texas A&M ‍‍‍	11	–	19	.367	23	–	35	.397
Kansas ‍‍‍	10	–	20	.333	25	–	30	.455
Iowa State ‍‍‍	7	–	23	.233	19	–	37	.339
Kansas State ‍‍‍	5	–	24	.172	19	–	32	.373
† – Conference champion ‡ – Tournament champion y – Invited to the NCAA tournament As of June 30, 2000; Rankings from Collegiate Baseball

The 2000 Big 12 Conference baseball tournament was held at AT&T Bricktown Ballpark in Oklahoma City, OK from May 17 through 21. Nebraska won their second of three consecutive tournaments and earned the Big 12 Conference's automatic bid to the 2000 NCAA Division I baseball tournament. This was the second year the conference used the format of the College World Series, with two 4-team double-elimination brackets and a final championship game.

== Regular season standings ==
Place	Seed	Team	Conference				Overall		
Place	Seed	Team	W	L	%	GB	W	L	%
1	1	Baylor	23	7	.767	–	45	17	.726
2	2	Nebraska	21	9	.700	2	51	17	.750
3	3	Oklahoma	20	10	.667	3	41	23	.641
4	4	Texas	19	10	.655	3.5	46	21	.687
5	5	Texas Tech	18	12	.600	5	36	26	.581
6	6	Oklahoma State	14	13	.519	7.5	36	22	.621
7	7	Missouri	13	14	.481	8.5	33	24	.579
8	8	Texas A&M	11	19	.367	12	23	35	.397
9	–	Kansas	10	20	.333	13	25	30	.455
10	–	Iowa State	7	23	.233	16	19	37	.339
11	–	Kansas State	5	24	.172	17.5	19	32	.373

- Colorado did not sponsor a baseball team.

== Tournament ==
First round
3	Oklahoma	9
6	Oklahoma State	8
7	Missouri	12
2	Nebraska	10
6	Oklahoma State	5
2	Nebraska	7
4	Texas	8
5	Texas Tech	4
1	Baylor	12
8	Texas A&M	3
5	Texas Tech	8
8	Texas A&M	6

Second round
3	Oklahoma	12
7	Missouri	6
2	Nebraska	4
7	Missouri	3
4	Texas	2
1	Baylor	3
5	Texas Tech	4
4	Texas	3

Semifinals
3	Oklahoma	1	1
2	Nebraska	3	6
1	Baylor	10	-
5	Texas Tech	1	-

Finals
2	Nebraska	11
1	Baylor	3

- Iowa State, Kansas, and Kansas State did not make the tournament.

== All-Tournament team ==
Position	Player	School
1B	Rick Park	Oklahoma
2B	Zach Lekse	Oklahoma
3B	Landon Brandes	Missouri
SS	Jace Brewer	Baylor
C	Kelly Shoppach	Baylor
OF	Marco Cunningham	Texas Tech
OF	Jaime Bubela	Baylor
OF	Adam Shabala	Nebraska
DH	Ryan Hubele	Texas
P	Beau Hale	Texas
P	Kyle Evans	Baylor
P	Chad Wiles	Nebraska
MOP	Adam Shabala	Nebraska

== See also ==
- College World Series
- NCAA Division I Baseball Championship
- Big 12 Conference baseball tournament
