= Missouri Tigers baseball 2000–2009 =

American college baseball seasons

== 2000 ==
2000 Missouri Tigers baseball
- Conference: Big 12 Conference
- Record: 33–24 (13–14 Big 12)
- Head coach: Tim Jamieson (6th year)

2000 Big 12 Conference baseball standings
	Conf.				Overall
Team	W		L	PCT	W		L	PCT
No. 18 Baylor ‍†‍‍^{y}	23	–	7	.767	45	–	17	.726
No. 11 Nebraska ‍‍‡‍^{y}	21	–	9	.700	51	–	17	.750
Oklahoma ‍‍‍^{y}	20	–	10	.667	41	–	23	.641
No. 7 Texas ‍‍‍^{y}	19	–	10	.655	46	–	21	.687
Texas Tech ‍‍‍^{y}	18	–	12	.600	36	–	26	.581
Oklahoma State ‍‍‍	14	–	13	.519	36	–	22	.621
Missouri ‍‍‍	13	–	14	.481	33	–	24	.579
Texas A&M ‍‍‍	11	–	19	.367	23	–	35	.397
Kansas ‍‍‍	10	–	20	.333	25	–	30	.455
Iowa State ‍‍‍	7	–	23	.233	19	–	37	.339
Kansas State ‍‍‍	5	–	24	.172	19	–	32	.373
† – Conference champion ‡ – Tournament champion y – Invited to the NCAA tournament As of June 30, 2000; Rankings from Collegiate Baseball

=== Roster ===
2000 Missouri Tigers roster
Pitchers: 13 P.J. McGinnis; 16 Brian Ackerson; 19 Logan Dale; 29 Jon Harris; 30 Ralph McCasland; 31 Mitch Kiler; 34 Matt Felts; 36 Pete Sansone; 37 Meade Smith; 38 Matt Hobbs; 45 Drew Endicott	Infielders: 2 Dustin Barnes; 3 Mike Rallo; 11 Landon Brandes; 12 Luke Cassis; 18 Kurt Propst; 25 Ryan Stegall; 28 Mick Weiss; 40 Joe Rooney; 43 Tony Vitello; Catchers: 5 Jon Williams; 17 Ryan Pickett	Outfielders: 4 Jayce Tingler; 7 Wes Fewell; 10 Nick Wilfong; 14 Kevin Henry; 15 Ryan Rallo; 21 Dan Bane; 42 W.T. Hoover; 44 J.R. Warner; Coaches: 9 Tim Jamieson

=== Schedule ===
2000 Missouri Tigers baseball game log
Regular season

February
Date	Opponent	Score	Overall record	Big 12 record
February 11	at Pepperdine	5–6	0–1	–
February 12	at Pepperdine	15–5	0–2	–
February 15	William Woods	15–5	1–2	–
February 17	vs. Nicholls State	3–2	2–2	–
February 18	vs. Arkansas Little Rock	3–9	2–3	–
February 19	at Northwestern State	2–1	3–3	–
February 20	vs. Centenary	10–2	4–3	–
February 22	Lincoln	2–4	4–4	–
February 25	at Texas Tech	16–14	5–4	1–0
February 26	at Texas Tech	6–11	5–5	1–1
February 27	at Texas Tech	6–5	6–5	2–1
February 29	Western Illinois	13–0	7–5	2–1

March
Date	Opponent	Score	Overall record	Big 12 record
March 1	Western Illinois	15–6	8–5	2–1
March 4	Texas	4–6	8–6	2–2
March 4	Texas	6–9	8–7	2–3
March 5	Texas	5–3	9–7	3–3
March 8	at SE Missouri State	8–14	9–8	3–3
March 14	Arkansas State	6–2	10–8	3–3
March 15	Arkansas State	7–6	11–8	3–3
March 17	Bowling Green	4–1	12–8	3–3
March 18	Bowling Green	6–5	13–8	3–3
March 19	Bowling Green	8–6	14–8	3–3
March 21	at Wichita State	5–6	14–9	3–3
March 24	at Kansas	0–3	14–10	3–4
March 25	at Kansas	12–2	15–10	4–4
March 26	at Kansas	10–7	16–10	5–4
March 28	Central Missouri State	12–8	17–10	5–4
March 31	at Iowa State	6–11	17–11	5–5

April
Date	Opponent	Score	Overall record	Big 12 record
April 1	at Iowa State	8–7	18–11	6–5
April 2	at Iowa State	5–3	19–11	7–5
April 4	Saint Louis	16–8	20–11	7–5
April 7	Baylor	4–6	20–12	7–6
April 8	Baylor	4–13	20–13	7–7
April 9	Baylor	9–8	21–13	8–7
April 12	at SW Missouri State	6–0	22–13	8–7
April 14	Nebraska	2–7	22–14	8–8
April 15	Nebraska	8–15	22–15	8–9
April 16	Nebraska	5–9	22–16	8–10
April 18	Kansas	3–2	23–16	8–10
April 21	Cal State Northridge	6–1	24–16	8–10
April 22	Cal State Northridge	8–1	25–16	8–10
April 23	Cal State Northridge	1–6	25–17	8–10
April 25	vs. Saint Louis	5–3	26–17	8–10
April 26	SW Missouri State	7–4	27–17	8–10
April 28	Kansas State	6–1	28–17	9–10
April 29	Kansas State	6–2	29–17	10–10
April 29	Kansas State	6–9	29–18	10–11

May
Date	Opponent	Score	Overall record	Big 12 record
May 6	Oklahoma	3–11	29–19	10–12
May 7	Oklahoma	7–11	29–20	10–13
May 8	Oklahoma	4–9	29–21	10–14
May 10	SE Missouri State	6–9	29–22	10–14
May 12	at Texas A&M	13–11	30–22	11–14
May 13	at Texas A&M	6–2	31–22	12–14
May 14	at Texas A&M	6–5	32–22	13–14

Postseason

Big 12 Tournament
Date	Opponent	Score	Overall record
May 17	vs. Nebraska	12–10	33–22
May 18	vs. Oklahoma	6–12	33–23
May 19	vs. Nebraska	3–4	33–24

=== Tigers in the 2000 MLB draft ===
The following members of the Missouri Tigers baseball program were drafted in the 2000 Major League Baseball draft.

Player	Position	Round	Overall	MLB Team
Nick Wilfong	OF	8th	241st	San Francisco Giants
Landon Brandes	3B	20th	593rd	St. Louis Cardinals
J. R. Warner	OF	26th	770th	Los Angeles Angels

== 2001 ==
2001 Missouri Tigers baseball
- Conference: Big 12 Conference
- Record: 31–24–1 (11–19 Big 12)
- Head coach: Tim Jamieson (7th year)

2001 Big 12 Conference baseball standings
	Conf.						Overall
Team	W		L		T	PCT	W		L		T	PCT
No. 7 Nebraska ‍†‍‡‍^{y}	20	–	8	–	0	.714	50	–	16	–	1	.754
No. 21 Texas Tech ‍‍‍	19	–	10	–	1	.650	42	–	20	–	1	.675
No. 28 Texas ‍‍‍^{y}	19	–	11	–	0	.633	36	–	26	–	0	.581
No. 22 Baylor ‍‍‍^{y}	17	–	10	–	0	.630	37	–	24	–	0	.607
Oklahoma State ^{y} ‍‍‍	16	–	14	–	0	.533	42	–	22	–	0	.656
Texas A&M ‍‍‍	15	–	15	–	0	.500	33	–	27	–	0	.550
Oklahoma ‍‍‍	13	–	16	–	1	.450	25	–	33	–	1	.432
Iowa State ‍‍‍	11	–	15	–	0	.423	24	–	29	–	1	.454
Kansas State ‍‍‍	10	–	17	–	0	.370	25	–	28	–	0	.472
Missouri ‍‍‍	11	–	19	–	0	.367	31	–	24	–	1	.563
Kansas ‍‍‍	7	–	23	–	0	.233	26	–	30	–	0	.464
† – Conference champion ‡ – Tournament champion y – Invited to the NCAA tournament As of June 30, 2001; Rankings from Collegiate Baseball

=== Roster ===
2001 Missouri Tigers roster
Pitchers: 8 Shaun Marcum; 19 Logan Dale; 20 Garrett Bauer; 26 Scott Nichols; 29 Jon Harris; 30 Mike Mitchell; 31 Mitch Kiler; 32 Richard hawkins; 34 Matt Felts; 35 Mark Alexander; 36 Pete Sansone; 38 Matt Hobbs; 45 Drew Endicott	Infielders: 12 Luke Cassis; 16 Felipe Tetelboin; 18 Kurt Propst; 22 Tony Vitello; 25 Ryan Stegall; 27 Aaron Peterik; 28 Mick Weiss; 41 Cody Ehlers; Catchers: 5 Jon Williams; 6 Brian Desch	Outfielders: 2 Lee Laskowski; 4 Jayce Tingler; 7 Wes Fewell; 14 Kevin Henry; 15 Ryan Rallo; 42 W.T. Hoover; Coaches: 9 Tim Jamieson

=== Schedule ===
2001 Missouri Tigers baseball game log
Regular season

February
Date	Opponent	Score	Overall record	Big 12 record
February 9	vs. San Jose State	0–0	0–0–1	–
February 10	at Loyola Marymount	10–7	1–0–1	–
February 11	at Pepperdine	1–4	1–1–1	–
February 16	vs. UNLV	10–1	2–1–1	–
February 17	at New Mexico	7–3	3–1–1	–
February 18	vs. Utah	9–12	3–2–1	–
February 24	at Oklahoma State	4–6	3–3–1	0–1
February 25	at Oklahoma State	2–7	3–4–1	0–2
February 26	at Oklahoma State	4–5	3–5–1	0–3

March
Date	Opponent	Score	Overall record	Big 12 record
March 2	at Baylor	2–3	3–6–1	0–4
March 3	at Baylor	2–12	3–7–1	0–5
March 4	at Baylor	5–4	4–7–1	1–5
March 7	Wichita State	9–8	5–7–1	1–5
March 9	at Kansas	4–7	5–8–1	1–6
March 10	Kansas	8–2	6–8–1	2–6
March 11	Kansas	1–0	7–8–1	3–6
March 13	Missouri Valley	9–2	8–8–1	3–6
March 14	Truman	12–2	9–8–1	3–6
March 17	Pepperdine	9–5	10–8–1	3–6
March 17	Pepperdine	13–4	11–8–1	3–6
March 18	Pepperdine	1–2	11–9–1	3–6
March 20	Western Illinois	12–0	12–9–1	3–6
March 21	Western Illinois	10–2	13–9–1	3–6
March 23	Nebraska	4–14	13–10–1	3–7
March 24	Nebraska	6–2	14–10–1	4–7
March 25	Nebraska	3–2	15–10–1	5–7
March 27	at Arkansas State	10–0	16–10–1	5–7
March 28	at Arkansas State	9–4	17–10–1	5–7
March 30	Texas Tech	5–4	18–10–1	6–7
March 31	Texas Tech	2–10	18–11–1	6–8

April
Date	Opponent	Score	Overall record	Big 12 record
April 1	Texas Tech	14–9	19–11–1	7–8
April 3	at SE Missouri State	7–4	20–11–1	7–8
April 6	Oklahoma	0–6	20–12–1	7–9
April 7	Oklahoma	9–13	20–13–1	7–10
April 8	Oklahoma	6–9	20–14–1	7–11
April 13	Texas	2–9	20–15–1	7–12
April 14	Texas	10–6	21–15–1	8–12
April 15	Texas	0–13	21–16–1	8–13
April 17	SE Missouri State	8–5	22–16–1	8–13
April 18	Creighton	11–7	23–17–1	8–13
April 20	Iowa State	5–12	23–17–1	8–14
April 21	Iowa State	7–3	24–17–1	9–14
April 22	Iowa State	7–6	25–17–1	10–14
April 24	at Saint Louis	11–6	26–17–1	10–14
April 25	vs. Saint Louis	4–2	27–17–1	10–14
April 27	at Kansas State	4–14	27–18–1	10–15
April 28	at Kansas State	3–7	27–19–1	10–16
April 29	at Kansas State	5–10	27–20–1	10–17

May
Date	Opponent	Score	Overall record	Big 12 record
May 1	SW Missouri State	12–11	28–20–1	10–17
May 5	Eastern Kentucky	5–2	29–20–1	10–17
May 5	Eastern Kentucky	5–6	29–21–1	10–17
May 6	Eastern Kentucky	12–2	30–21–1	10–17
May 8	vs. SW Missouri State	3–5	30–22–1	10–17
May 10	Texas A&M	4–6	30–23–1	10–18
May 11	Texas A&M	4–10	30–24–1	10–19
May 12	Texas A&M	8–5	31–24–1	11–19

=== Tigers in the 2001 MLB draft ===
The following members of the Missouri Tigers baseball program were drafted in the 2001 Major League Baseball draft.

Player	Position	Round	Overall	MLB Team
Ryan Stegall	SS	7th	206th	Houston Astros
Matt Hobbs	LHP	30th	900th	San Diego Padres
Jon Williams	C	44th	1328th	San Francisco Giants

== 2002 ==
2002 Missouri Tigers baseball
- Conference: Big 12 Conference
- Record: 24–29 (9–16 Big 12)
- Head coach: Tim Jamieson (8th year)
- Home stadium: Taylor Stadium

2002 Big 12 Conference baseball standings
	Conf.				Overall
Team	W		L	PCT	W		L	PCT
No. 1 Texas ‍†‍‡‍^{y}	19	–	8	.704	57	–	15	.792
No. 8 Nebraska ‍‍‍^{y}	16	–	11	.593	47	–	21	.691
No. 24 Texas Tech ‍‍‍^{y}	16	–	11	.593	42	–	20	.677
Oklahoma ‍‍‍^{y}	15	–	12	.556	35	–	27	.565
Oklahoma State ‍‍‍	13	–	13	.500	37	–	21	.638
Kansas State ‍‍‍	13	–	13	.500	30	–	25	.545
Baylor ‍‍‍^{y}	13	–	13	.500	36	–	26	.581
Texas A&M ‍‍‍	13	–	14	.481	35	–	24	.593
Missouri ‍‍‍	9	–	16	.360	24	–	29	.453
Kansas ‍‍‍	5	–	21	.192	22	–	29	.431
† – Conference champion ‡ – Tournament champion y – Invited to the NCAA tournament As of June 30, 2002; Rankings from Collegiate Baseball

=== Roster ===
2002 Missouri Tigers roster
Pitchers: 20 Garrett Bauer; 24 Abel Newton; 27 Derek Roper; 32 Richard hawkins; 35 Mark Alexander; 36 Travis Wendte; 37 Aaron Paterson; 38 Matt Hobbs; 40 Garrett Broshuis; 44 Justin James; 45 Drew Endicott	Infielders: 8 Chris Julo; 12 Luke Cassis; 16 Felipe Tetelboin; 18 Kurt Propst; 26 Jody Roughton; 28 Mick Weiss; 41 Cody Ehlers; Catchers: 3 Brent Lacy; 6 Brian Desch; 25 Ryan Rothford	Outfielders: 2 Lee Laskowski; 4 Jayce Tingler; 7 Wes Fewell; 11 Bo Davis; 15 Ryan Rallo; 21 Dan Bane; 42 W.T. Hoover; Coaches: 9 Tim Jamieson

=== Schedule ===
2002 Missouri Tigers baseball game log
Regular season

February
Date	Opponent	Score	Overall record	Big 12 record
February 14	vs. Washington	6–10	0–1	–
February 15	vs. Portland	6–4	1–1	–
February 16	vs. Portland	11–7	2–1	–
February 17	vs. Washington	10–9	3–1	–
February 22	vs. Notre Dame	6–7	3–2	–
February 23	vs. Southern Illinois	4–8	3–3	–

March
Date	Opponent	Score	Overall record	Big 12 record
March 5	Missouri Baptist	10–4	4–4	–
March 5	Lindenwood	14–7	5–4	–
March 6	William Woods	20–4	6–4	–
March 8	at Oklahoma	9–10	6–5	0–1
March 9	at Oklahoma	8–9	6–6	0–2
March 10	at Oklahoma	10–16	6–7	0–3
March 12	Arkansas State	8–3	7–7	0–3
March 13	Arkansas State	10–15	7–8	0–3
March 15	Texas	0–15	7–9	0–4
March 16	Texas	3–6	7–10	0–5
March 17	Texas	2–7	7–11	0–6
March 19	Arkansas	10–11	7–12	0–6
March 22	Baylor	7–5	8–12	1–6
March 23	Baylor	7–6	9–12	2–6
March 24	Baylor	8–11	9–13	2–7
March 26	Harris-Stowe	5–2	10–13	2–7
March 29	at Texas Tech	4–7	10–14	2–8
March 31	at Texas Tech	6–13	10–15	2–9
March 31	at Texas Tech	7–1	11–15	3–9

April
Date	Opponent	Score	Overall record	Big 12 record
April 2	SE Missouri State	5–8	11–16	3–9
April 5	Washington	11–9	12–16	3–9
April 6	Washington	5–3	13–16	3–9
April 7	Washington	12–11	14–16	3–9
April 9	at SW Missouri State	4–6	14–17	3–9
April 12	Nebraska	9–6	15–17	4–9
April 13	Nebraska	3–6	15–18	4–10
April 14	Nebraska	16–12	16–18	5–10
April 16	SW Missouri State	10–20	16–19	5–10
April 17	Saint Louis	11–4	17–19	5–10
April 20	at Kansas	16–10	18–19	6–10
April 21	at Kansas	14–4	19–19	7–10
April 23	Saint Louis	10–0	20–19	7–10
April 26	at Texas A&M	11–10	21–19	8–10
April 27	at Texas A&M	5–16	21–20	9–11
April 27	at Texas A&M	13–2	22–20	9–11
April 30	Western Illinois	5–7	22–21	9–11

May
Date	Opponent	Score	Overall record	Big 12 record
May 1	Western Illinois	12–4	23–21	9–11
May 3	at Oklahoma State	5–8	23–22	9–12
May 4	at Oklahoma State	11–12	23–23	9–13
May 5	at Oklahoma State	1–15	23–24	9–14
May 7	vs. SE Missouri State	2–5	23–25	9–14
May 10	Kansas State	2–5	23–26	9–15
May 11	Kansas State	1–10	23–27	9–16
May 16	Northern Iowa	5–8	23–28	9–16
May 17	Northern Iowa	6–3	24–28	9–16
May 18	Northern Iowa	6–10	24–29	9–16

=== Tigers in the 2002 MLB draft ===
The following members of the Missouri Tigers baseball program were drafted in the 2002 Major League Baseball draft.

Player	Position	Round	Overall	MLB Team
Jody Roughton	3B	24th	710th	Detroit Tigers
Drew Endicott	RHP	41st	1218th	Kansas City Royals

== 2003 ==
2003 Missouri Tigers baseball

Starkville Regional, 1–2
- Conference: Big 12 Conference
- Record: 36–22 (15–11 Big 12)
- Head coach: Tim Jamieson (9th year)
- Assistant coach: Tony Vitello (1st year)
- Home stadium: Taylor Stadium

2003 Big 12 Conference baseball standings
	Conf.				Overall
Team	W		L	PCT	W		L	PCT
No. 15 Nebraska ‍†‍‍^{y}	20	–	7	.741	47	–	18	.723
No. 17 Texas A&M ‍‍‍^{y}	19	–	8	.704	45	–	19	.703
No. 4 Texas ‍‍‡‍^{y}	19	–	8	.704	50	–	20	.714
Missouri ‍‍‍^{y}	15	–	11	.577	36	–	22	.621
No. 13 Baylor ‍‍‍^{y}	15	–	12	.556	45	–	23	.662
Oklahoma State ‍‍‍	14	–	13	.519	34	–	23	.596
Oklahoma ‍‍‍	10	–	17	.370	23	–	31	.426
Kansas ‍‍‍	9	–	18	.333	35	–	28	.556
Texas Tech ‍‍‍	8	–	18	.308	30	–	25	.545
Kansas State ‍‍‍	5	–	22	.185	15	–	37	.288
† – Conference champion ‡ – Tournament champion y – Invited to the NCAA tournament As of June 30, 2003; Rankings from Collegiate Baseball

The 2003 Missouri Tigers baseball team represented the University of Missouri in the 2003 NCAA Division I baseball season. The Tigers played their home games at Taylor Stadium. The team was coached by Tim Jamieson in his 9th season at Missouri.

For the first time since 1996, the Tigers advanced to the NCAA tournament, where they were eliminated by Mississippi State in the Starkville Regional.

=== Roster ===
2003 Missouri Tigers roster
Pitchers: 10 Taylor Parker; 17 Nick Admire; 19 Stephan Holst; 20 Andy Shipman; 26 Matthew Stallings; 27 Derek Roper; 28 Brian Bilica; 32 Richard hawkins; 35 Mark Alexander; 36 Travis Wendte; 40 Garrett Broshuis; 44 Justin James; 45 Danny Hill	Infielders: 8 Adam Garrett; 18 Zane Taylor; 22 Ian Kinsler; 25 Jeremy Hernandez; 41 Cody Ehlers; Catchers: 3 Brent Lacy; 12 Brad Flanders; 13 Adam Jones	Outfielders: 2 Lee Laskowski; 4 Jayce Tingler; 5 Tyrone Roberson; 7 Tyler Williams; 11 Bo Davis; 21 James Boone; 30 Josiah Holst; 32 Kyle Johnson; 51 Ryan Rallo; Coaches: 9 Tim Jamieson

=== Schedule ===
2003 Missouri Tigers baseball game log
Regular season

February
Date	Opponent	Score	Overall record	Big 12 record
February 6	at UNC Wilmington	12–1	1–0	–
February 7	at UNC Wilmington	2–5	1–1	–
February 8	at UNC Wilmington	6–3	2–1	–
February 15	vs. Northwestern	3–5	2–2	–
February 15	vs. Cal Poly	2–4	2–3	–
February 22	vs. Northwestern State	4–8	2–4	–
February 22	at Louisiana-Monroe	13–10	3–4	–
February 23	vs. Northern Iowa	11–4	4–4	–

March
Date	Opponent	Score	Overall record	Big 12 record
March 1	Youngstown State	9–0	5–4	–
March 1	Youngstown State	10–2	6–4	–
March 6	Truman	30–0	7–4	–
March 6	Lincoln	9–1	8–4	–
March 7	Creighton	9–0	9–4	–
March 8	Creighton	4–6	9–5	–
March 8	Creighton	6–1	10–5	–
March 11	at SE Missouri State	9–8	11–5	–
March 12	Maryville	19–1	12–5	–
March 14	at Texas	1–4	12–6	0–1
March 15	at Texas	7–16	12–7	0–2
March 16	at Texas	3–6	12–8	0–3
March 19	Illinois State	16–11	13–8	0–3
March 21	Kansas	11–7	14–8	1–3
March 22	Kansas	14–8	15–8	2–3
March 23	Kansas	7–4	16–8	3–3
March 26	at Illinois State	4–3	17–8	3–3
March 28	at Kansas State	14–2	18–8	4–3
March 29	at Kansas State	8–3	19–8	5–3
March 30	at Kansas State	5–4	20–8	6–3

April
Date	Opponent	Score	Overall record	Big 12 record
April 2	at Saint Louis	12–6	21–8	6–3
April 4	Texas Tech	8–6	22–8	7–3
April 5	Texas Tech	11–5	23–8	8–3
April 9	Western Illinois	16–3	24–8	8–3
April 11	at Nebraska	4–3	25–8	9–3
April 12	at Nebraska	9–11	25–9	9–4
April 13	at Nebraska	6–7	25–10	9–5
April 15	SW Missouri State	9–12	25–11	9–5
April 18	at Baylor	4–10	25–12	9–6
April 19	at Baylor	23–18	26–12	10–6
April 20	at Baylor	12–8	27–12	11–6
April 22	at SW Missouri State	1–2	27–13	11–6
April 25	Texas A&M	1–6	27–14	11–7
April 26	Texas A&M	7–6	28–14	12–7
April 27	Texas A&M	8–9	28–15	12–8
April 29	vs. Saint Louis	6–0	29–15	12–8
April 30	SE Missouri State	11–10	30–15	12–8

May
Date	Opponent	Score	Overall record	Big 12 record
May 2	at Oklahoma State	4–7	30–16	12–9
May 3	at Oklahoma State	14–11	31–16	13–9
May 4	at Oklahoma State	7–17	31–17	13–10
May 9	Rockhurst	15–6	32–17	13–10
May 16	Oklahoma	6–1	33–17	14–10
May 17	Oklahoma	7–6	34–17	15–10
May 18	Oklahoma	0–7	34–18	15–11

Postseason

Big 12 Tournament
Date	Opponent	Site/stadium	Score	Overall record
May 21	vs. Baylor	Bricktown Ballpark	8–9	34–19
May 21	vs. Kansas	Bricktown Ballpark	4–3	35–19
May 23	vs. Baylor	Bricktown Ballpark	0–11	35–20

NCAA tournament: Pepperdine Regional
Date	Opponent	Site/stadium	Score	Overall record
May 30	vs. North Carolina	Dudy Noble Field	3–4	35–21
May 31	vs. Middle Tennessee	Dudy Noble Field	13–7	36–21
May 31	vs. Mississippi State	Dudy Noble Field	5–10	36–22

=== Tigers in the 2003 MLB draft ===
The following members of the Missouri Tigers baseball program were drafted in the 2003 Major League Baseball draft.

Player	Position	Round	Overall	MLB Team
Justin James	RHP	5th	140th	Toronto Blue Jays
Jayce Tingler	OF	10th	290th	Toronto Blue Jays
Ian Kinsler	SS	17th	496th	Texas Rangers
Derek Roper	RHP	32nd	965th	St. Louis Cardinals

== 2004 ==
2004 Missouri Tigers baseball

Fayetteville Regional, 1–2
- Conference: Big 12 Conference
- Record: 38–23–1 (12–14 Big 12)
- Head coach: Tim Jamieson (10th year)
- Assistant coach: Tony Vitello (2nd year)
- Home stadium: Taylor Stadium

2004 Big 12 Conference baseball standings
	Conf.						Overall
Team	W		L		T	PCT	W		L		T	PCT
No. 2 Texas ‍†‍‍^{y}	19	–	7	–	0	.731	58	–	15	–	0	.795
Oklahoma ‍‍‍^{y}	19	–	8	–	0	.704	38	–	24	–	0	.613
Texas Tech ‍‍‍^{y}	17	–	9	–	0	.654	40	–	21	–	0	.656
Oklahoma State ‍‍‡‍^{y}	15	–	11	–	0	.577	38	–	24	–	0	.613
No. 16 Texas A&M ‍‍‍^{y}	14	–	12	–	0	.538	42	–	22	–	0	.656
Baylor ‍‍‍	13	–	12	–	0	.520	29	–	31	–	0	.483
Missouri ‍‍‍^{y}	12	–	14	–	0	.462	38	–	23	–	1	.621
Nebraska ‍‍‍	11	–	16	–	0	.407	36	–	23	–	0	.610
Kansas ‍‍‍	7	–	19	–	0	.269	31	–	31	–	1	.500
Kansas State ‍‍‍	4	–	23	–	0	.148	26	–	30	–	0	.464
† – Conference champion ‡ – Tournament champion y – Invited to the NCAA tournament As of June 30, 2004; Rankings from Collegiate Baseball

The 2004 Missouri Tigers baseball team represented the University of Missouri in the 2004 NCAA Division I baseball season. The Tigers played their home games at Taylor Stadium. The team was coached by Tim Jamieson in his 10th season at Missouri.

The Tigers advanced to back-to-back NCAA tournaments for the first time since the 1980–1981 season.

=== Roster ===
2004 Missouri Tigers roster
Pitchers: 4 Dustin Braud; 10 Taylor Parker; 17 Nick Admire; 29 Erik Dessau; 31 Max Scherzer; 35 Mark Alexander; 40 Garrett Broshuis; 42 Michael Cole; 45 Danny Hill	Infielders: 6 Trevor Helms; 8 Adam Garrett; 16 Gary Arndt; 18 Zane Taylor; 25 Jeremy Hernandez; 28 John McKee; 41 Cody Ehlers; Catchers: 12 Brad Flanders; 19 Cosme Caballero	Outfielders: 2 Lee Laskowski; 5 Tyrone Roberson; 7 Tyler Williams; 11 Bo Davis; 21 James Boone; 30 Josiah Holst; 32 Kyle Johnson; 44 Hunter Mense; 51 Ryan Rallo; Coaches: 9 Tim Jamieson

=== Schedule ===
2004 Missouri Tigers baseball game log
Regular season

February
Date	Opponent	Score	Overall record	Big 12 record
February 13	vs. Nevada	8–7	1–0	–
February 14	vs. Portland	13–0	2–0	–
February 15	vs. Portland	2–1	3–0	–
February 19	at Coastal Carolina	12–10	4–0	–
February 20	vs. Rider	4–2	5–0	–
February 21	at Coastal Carolina	21–4	6–0	–
February 22	vs. Albany	3–5	6–1	–
February 27	Youngstown State	2–3	6–2	–
February 28	Youngstown State	7–0	7–2	–
February 29	Youngstown State	8–1	8–2	–

March
Date	Opponent	Score	Overall record	Big 12 record
March 2	Western Illinois	2–1	9–2	–
March 3	Western Illinois	8–2	10–2	–
March 5	at Washington	16–2	11–2	–
March 6	at Washington	6–11	11–3	–
March 7	at Washington	6–6	11–3–1	–
March 12	vs. Wake Forest	5–4	12–3–1	–
March 12	vs. Indiana State	7–6	13–3–1	–
March 13	vs. Memphis	3–2	14–3–1	–
March 14	vs. Tennessee-Martin	7–3	15–3–1	–
March 17	Illinois State	2–5	15–4–1	–
March 19	Chicago State	19–2	16–4–1	–
March 20	Chicago State	8–1	17–4–1	–
March 21	Chicago State	21–1	18–4–1	–
March 24	at SE Missouri State	6–3	19–4–1	–
March 26	Kansas State	3–5	19–5–1	0–1
March 27	Kansas State	4–6	19–6–1	0–2
March 28	Kansas State	12–0	20–6–1	1–2

April
Date	Opponent	Score	Overall record	Big 12 record
April 2	Baylor	12–4	21–6–1	2–2
April 3	Baylor	9–15	21–7–1	2–3
April 4	Baylor	6–9	21–8–1	2–4
April 7	Saint Louis	1–3	21–9–1	2–4
April 9	at Oklahoma	2–3	21–10–1	2–5
April 10	at Oklahoma	5–8	21–11–1	2–6
April 11	at Oklahoma	3–4	21–12–1	2–7
April 14	at SW Missouri State	5–4	22–12–1	2–7
April 16	Nebraska	3–2	23–12–1	3–7
April 17	Nebraska	16–11	24–12–1	4–7
April 18	Nebraska	10–11	24–13–1	4–8
April 20	SW Missouri State	4–5	24–14–1	4–8
April 24	Texas A&M	0–1	24–15–1	4–9
April 25	Texas A&M	1–7	24–16–1	4–10
April 28	Saint Louis	3–0	25–16–1	4–10
April 30	Texas	4–1	26–16–1	5–10

May
Date	Opponent	Score	Overall record	Big 12 record
May 1	Texas	8–0	27–16–1	6–10
May 2	Texas	0–16	27–17–1	6–11
May 7	Texas Tech	5–7	27–18–1	6–12
May 8	Texas Tech	5–3	28–18–1	7–12
May 9	Texas Tech	3–1	29–18–1	8–12
May 14	Kansas	6–11	29–19–1	8–13
May 15	Kansas	2–1	30–19–1	9–13
May 16	Kansas	3–4	30–20–1	9–14
May 19	SE Missouri State	12–11	31–20–1	10–14
May 21	Oklahoma State	9–5	32–20–1	10–14
May 22	Oklahoma State	10–9	33–20–1	11–14
May 23	Oklahoma State	7–3	34–20–1	12–14

Postseason

Big 12 Tournament
Date	Opponent	Site/stadium	Score	Overall record
May 26	vs. Oklahoma	Ameriquest Field in Arlington	9–5	35–20–1
May 27	vs. Baylor	Ameriquest Field in Arlington	12–1	36–20–1
May 29	vs. Baylor	Ameriquest Field in Arlington	10–7	37–20–1
May 30	vs. Oklahoma State	Ameriquest Field in Arlington	9–10	37–21–1

NCAA tournament: Pepperdine Regional
Date	Opponent	Site/stadium	Score	Overall record
June 4	vs. Wichita State	Baum Stadium	0–3	37–22–1
June 5	vs. Le Moyne	Baum Stadium	11–3	38–22–1
June 5	vs. Arkansas	Baum Stadium	5–10	38–23–1

=== Tigers in the 2004 MLB draft ===
The following members of the Missouri Tigers baseball program were drafted in the 2004 Major League Baseball draft.

Player	Position	Round	Overall	MLB Team
Danny Hill	RHP	3rd	87th	Toronto Blue Jays
Garrett Broshuis	RHP	5th	160th	San Francisco Giants
Cody Ehlers	1B	11th	339th	New York Yankees
Mark Alexander	RHP	20th	598th	Los Angeles Dodgers

== 2005 ==
2005 Missouri Tigers baseball

Fullerton Regional, 1–2
- Conference: Big 12 Conference
- Record: 40–23 (16–11 Big 12)
- Head coach: Tim Jamieson (11th year)
- Assistant coach: Tony Vitello (3rd year)
- Home stadium: Taylor Stadium

2005 Big 12 Conference baseball standings
	Conf.						Overall
Team	W		L		T	PCT	W		L		T	PCT
No. 6 Nebraska ‍†‍‡‍^{y}	19	–	8	–	0	.704	57	–	15	–	0	.792
No. 4 Baylor ‍†‍‍^{y}	19	–	8	–	0	.704	46	–	24	–	0	.657
No. 1 Texas ‍‍‍^{y}	16	–	10	–	0	.615	56	–	16	–	0	.778
Missouri ‍‍‍^{y}	16	–	11	–	0	.593	40	–	23	–	0	.635
Oklahoma ‍‍‍^{y}	14	–	13	–	0	.519	35	–	26	–	0	.574
Oklahoma State ‍‍‍	12	–	15	–	0	.444	34	–	25	–	0	.576
Kansas ‍‍‍	11	–	15	–	0	.423	36	–	28	–	0	.563
Texas Tech ‍‍‍	9	–	16	–	0	.360	34	–	25	–	0	.576
Texas A&M ‍‍‍	9	–	18	–	0	.333	30	–	25	–	1	.545
Kansas State ‍‍‍	8	–	19	–	0	.296	30	–	25	–	0	.545
† – Conference champion ‡ – Tournament champion y – Invited to the NCAA tournament Rankings from Collegiate Baseball

The 2005 Missouri Tigers baseball team represented the University of Missouri in the 2005 NCAA Division I baseball season. The Tigers played their home games at Taylor Stadium. The team was coached by Tim Jamieson in his 10th season at Missouri.

With a final ranking of 21st, the Tigers finished the season ranked in the Top 25 of the Baseball America poll for the first time since 1980.

=== Roster ===
2005 Missouri Tigers roster
Pitchers: 4 Dustin Braud; 10 Taylor Parker; 17 Nick Admire; 24 Nathan Culp; 31 Max Scherzer; 36 Travis Wendte; 37 Meade Hedricks; 42 Michael Cole; 45 Andrew Johnston; 55 Doug Mathis	Infielders: 2 Jeff Zelenovich; 6 Trevor Helms; 11 Greg O'Neill; 16 Gary Arndt; 18 Zane Taylor; 25 Derek Chambers; 28 John McKee; Catchers: 19 Cosme Caballero; 26 Dan Pietroburgo; 27 J.C. Field	Outfielders: 3 Evan Frey; 5 Tyrone Roberson; 7 Tyler Williams; 8 Bryson LeBlanc; 21 James Boone; 44 Hunter Mense; 51 Jacob Priday; Coaches: 9 Tim Jamieson

=== Schedule ===
2005 Missouri Tigers baseball game log
Regular season

February
Date	Opponent	Score	Overall record	Big 12 record
February 10	vs. Portland	7–4	1–0	–
February 17	vs. Winthrop	4–7	1–1	–
February 18	vs. Gardner-Webb	12–9	2–1	–
February 19	vs. Winthrop	10–3	3–1	–
February 20	vs. Akron	11–0	4–1	–
February 25	vs. Navy	25–2	5–1	–
February 26	vs. Indiana State	10–1	6–1	–
February 27	vs. Memphis	5–6	6–2	–
February 28	at Murray State	5–6	6–3	–

March
Date	Opponent	Score	Overall record	Big 12 record
March 4	Eastern Michigan	7–1	7–3	–
March 5	Eastern Michigan	18–2	8–3	–
March 5	Eastern Michigan	6–7	8–4	–
March 6	Eastern Michigan	14–4	9–4	–
March 9	Illinois State	15–2	10–4	–
March 12	Youngstown State	13–0	11–4	–
March 13	Youngstown State	17–0	12–4	–
March 14	Youngstown State	12–2	13–4	–
March 18	North Dakota State	10–0	14–4	–
March 19	North Dakota State	11–1	15–4	–
March 19	North Dakota State	21–0	16–4	–
March 20	North Dakota State	13–3	17–4	–
March 25	at Kansas State	3–1	18–4	1–0
March 26	at Kansas State	6–5	19–4	2–0
March 27	at Kansas State	3–2	20–4	3–0
March 30	at Saint Louis	16–0	21–4	3–0

April
Date	Opponent	Score	Overall record	Big 12 record
April 1	Texas Tech	25–0	22–4	4–0
April 2	Texas Tech	7–2	23–4	5–0
April 3	Texas Tech	3–5	23–5	5–1
April 6	at SE Missouri State	5–8	23–6	5–1
April 8	Texas A&M	2–1	24–6	6–1
April 9	Texas A&M	7–3	25–6	7–1
April 10	Texas A&M	8–3	26–6	8–1
April 13	at SE Missouri State	10–2	27–6	8–1
April 15	at Oklahoma State	2–6	27–7	8–2
April 16	at Oklahoma State	4–6	27–8	8–3
April 17	at Oklahoma State	5–8	27–9	8–4
April 20	Saint Louis	13–4	28–9	8–4
April 23	Oklahoma	1–2	28–10	8–5
April 23	Oklahoma	10–6	29–10	9–5
April 24	Oklahoma	6–4	30–10	10–5
April 26	at SW Missouri State	1–2	30–11	10–5
April 29	at Texas	1–4	30–12	10–6
April 30	at Texas	7–2	31–12	11–6

May
Date	Opponent	Score	Overall record	Big 12 record
May 1	at Texas	1–6	31–13	11–7
May 3	SW Missouri State	6–10	31–14	11–7
May 6	at Nebraska	2–1	32–14	12–7
May 7	at Nebraska	5–7	32–15	12–8
May 8	at Nebraska	5–6	32–16	12–9
May 13	Kansas	8–0	33–16	13–9
May 14	Kansas	3–9	33–17	13–10
May 15	Kansas	4–3	34–17	14–10
May 17	vs. Southern Illinois	0–7	34–18	14–10
May 18	vs. Illinois	6–2	35–18	14–10
May 20	at Baylor	5–7	35–19	14–11
May 21	at Baylor	7–3	36–19	15–11
May 22	at Baylor	10–4	37–19	16–11

Postseason

Big 12 Tournament
Date	Opponent	Site/stadium	Score	Overall record
May 25	vs. Oklahoma	Bricktown Ballpark	8–7	38–19
May 26	vs. Texas Tech	Bricktown Ballpark	10–1	39–19
May 28	vs. Nebraska	Bricktown Ballpark	4–5	39–20
May 28	vs. Nebraska	Bricktown Ballpark	9–17	39–21

NCAA tournament: Pepperdine Regional
Date	Opponent	Site/stadium	Score	Overall record
June 3	vs. Arizona	Goodwin Field	3–5	39–22
June 4	vs. Harvard	Goodwin Field	14–6	40–22
June 5	vs. Cal State Fullerton	Goodwin Field	6–8	40–23

=== Tigers in the 2005 MLB draft ===
The following members of the Missouri Tigers baseball program were drafted in the 2005 Major League Baseball draft.

Player	Position	Round	Overall	MLB Team
James Boone	OF	3rd	91st	Pittsburgh Pirates
Andrew Johnston	RHP	9th	267th	Colorado Rockies
Doug Mathis	RHP	13th	399th	Texas Rangers

== 2006 ==
2006 Missouri Tigers baseball

Pepperdine Regional champions

Fullerton Super Regional, 0–2
- Conference: Big 12 Conference
- Record: 35–28 (12–15 Big 12)
- Head coach: Tim Jamieson (12th year)
- Assistant coach: Evan Pratte (9th year); Tony Vitello (4th year)
- Home stadium: Taylor Stadium

2006 Big 12 Conference baseball standings
	Conf.						Overall
Team	W		L		T	PCT	W		L		T	PCT
No. 17 Texas ‍†‍‍^{y}	19	–	7	–	0	.731	41	–	21	–	0	.661
No. 23 Oklahoma State ‍‍‍^{y}	18	–	9	–	0	.667	41	–	20	–	0	.672
No. 10 Oklahoma ‍‍‍^{y}	17	–	10	–	0	.630	45	–	22	–	0	.672
No. 22 Nebraska ‍‍‍^{y}	17	–	10	–	0	.630	42	–	17	–	0	.712
No. 26 Baylor ‍‍‍^{y}	13	–	14	–	0	.481	37	–	26	–	0	.587
Kansas ‍‍‡‍^{y}	13	–	14	–	0	.481	43	–	25	–	0	.632
No. 16 Missouri ‍‍‍^{y}	12	–	15	–	0	.444	35	–	28	–	0	.556
Texas Tech ‍‍‍	9	–	16	–	1	.365	31	–	26	–	1	.543
Kansas State ‍‍‍	8	–	17	–	2	.333	31	–	20	–	2	.604
Texas A&M ‍‍‍	6	–	20	–	1	.241	25	–	30	–	1	.455
† – Conference champion ‡ – Tournament champion y – Invited to the NCAA tournament Rankings from Collegiate Baseball

The 2006 Missouri Tigers baseball team represented the University of Missouri in the 2006 NCAA Division I baseball season. The Tigers played their home games at Taylor Stadium. The team was coached by Tim Jamieson in his 12th season at Missouri.

After losing their opening game, the Tigers came back to win the Pepperdine Regional, becoming the first #4 seed ever to win a Regional. The Tigers were eliminated by Cal State Fullerton in the Fullerton Super Regional.

=== Roster ===
2006 Missouri Tigers baseball team
Players
Coaches

#	Pos.	Name	B/T	Height	Weight	Year	Home town
17	RHP	Nick Admire	R/R	5 ft 9 in (1.75 m)	200 lb (91 kg)	Sr	Lebanon, MO
16	INF	Gary Arndt	R/R	5 ft 10 in (1.78 m)	188 lb (85 kg)	Jr	Racine, WI
13	INF	Coby Arzola	R/R	5 ft 8 in (1.73 m)	180 lb (82 kg)	RS Fr	Columbia, IL
4	INF	Brock Bond	S/R	5 ft 10 in (1.78 m)	195 lb (88 kg)	So	St. Louis, MO
21	RHP	David Cales	R/R	5 ft 11 in (1.8 m)	182 lb (83 kg)	Fr	Chicago, IL
5	OF	Kurt Calvert	L/L	5 ft 9 in (1.75 m)	165 lb (75 kg)	So	Wildwood, MO
25	INF	Derek Chambers	L/L	6 ft 2 in (1.88 m)	201 lb (91 kg)	Sr	Bryant, AR
40	LHP	Brant Combs	L/L	6 ft 3 in (1.91 m)	193 lb (88 kg)	RS Fr	Olathe, KS
43	RHP	Aaron Crow	R/R	6 ft 2 in (1.88 m)	201 lb (91 kg)	Fr	Wakarusa, KS
24	LHP	Nathan Culp	L/L	6 ft 2 in (1.88 m)	180 lb (82 kg)	Jr	Edwardsville, IL
30	INF	Bill Disselhoff	R/R	6 ft 3 in (1.91 m)	218 lb (99 kg)	RS Fr	Kansas City, MO
27	C	J.C. Field	R/R	6 ft 1 in (1.85 m)	210 lb (95 kg)	Sr	Tucson, AZ
3	OF	Evan Frey	L/L	5 ft 10 in (1.78 m)	170 lb (77 kg)	So	Edwardsville, IL
14	RHP	Bret Harvel	R/R	6 ft 2 in (1.88 m)	192 lb (87 kg)	RS Fr	Lee's Summit, MO
6	INF	Trevor Helms	R/R	5 ft 10 in (1.78 m)	187 lb (85 kg)	Sr	Chesterfield, MO
38	RHP	Stephan Holst	R/R	6 ft 3 in (1.91 m)	215 lb (98 kg)	Jr	Independence, MO
2	OF	John Kruse	R/R	5 ft 10 in (1.78 m)	207 lb (94 kg)	RS Fr	Columbia, MO
8	OF	Bryson LeBlanc	L/L	5 ft 5 in (1.65 m)	158 lb (72 kg)	Sr	New Orleans, LA
20	OF	Ryan Lollis	L/L	6 ft 0 in (1.83 m)	190 lb (86 kg)	Fr	Houston, TX
7	INF	Kyle Mach	R/R	5 ft 10 in (1.78 m)	187 lb (85 kg)	Fr	Chesterfield, MO
28	INF	John McKee	R/R	6 ft 2 in (1.88 m)	222 lb (101 kg)	Jr	St. Louis, MO
44	OF	Hunter Mense	L/L	6 ft 0 in (1.83 m)	195 lb (88 kg)	Jr	Liberty, MO
45	RHP	Andrew Mueller	R/R	6 ft 2 in (1.88 m)	175 lb (79 kg)	Fr	Columbia, MO
10	LHP	Taylor Parker	L/L	5 ft 10 in (1.78 m)	140 lb (64 kg)	Sr	Bellaire, TX
26	C	Dan Pietroburgo	R/R	6 ft 0 in (1.83 m)	195 lb (88 kg)	So	Belleville, IL
51	OF	Jacob Priday	R/R	6 ft 1 in (1.85 m)	220 lb (100 kg)	So	Sikeston, MO
35	RHP	Brett Reynolds	R/R	6 ft 2 in (1.88 m)	184 lb (83 kg)	Jr	Pea Ridge, AR
31	RHP	Max Scherzer	R/R	6 ft 2 in (1.88 m)	210 lb (95 kg)	Jr	Chesterfield, MO
54	LHP	T.J. Sinovich	L/L	6 ft 3 in (1.91 m)	223 lb (101 kg)	RS Fr	St. Louis, MO
18	OF	Zane Taylor	L/R	5 ft 11 in (1.8 m)	182 lb (83 kg)	Sr	Kirksville, MO
46	LHP	John Thies	L/L	6 ft 1 in (1.85 m)	216 lb (98 kg)	So	Cape Girardeau, MO
36	RHP	Travis Wendte	R/R	6 ft 2 in (1.88 m)	194 lb (88 kg)	Sr	Moore, OK
11	C	Dan Wise	R/R	5 ft 10 in (1.78 m)	207 lb (94 kg)	Fr	Olathe, KS
32	OF	Matt Wulfers	L/R	6 ft 2 in (1.88 m)	211 lb (96 kg)	RS Fr	Cape Girardeau, MO
55	LHP	Rick Zagone	L/L	6 ft 2 in (1.88 m)	215 lb (98 kg)	Fr	Crystal Lake, IL

Head coach

9 Tim Jamieson (12th year)

Assistant coach(es)

23 Evan Pratte (9th year)
22 Tony Vitello (4th year)

Legend

- (C) Team captain
- (S) Suspended
- (I) Ineligible
- Injured
- Current redshirt

=== Schedule ===
2006 Missouri Tigers baseball game log
Regular season

February
Date	Opponent	Site/stadium	Score	MU Decision	Attendance	Overall record	Big 12 record
February 9	vs. East Tennessee St.	Buccaneer Ballpark	2–3	Holst (L; 0–1)	143	0–1	–
February 10	at Charleston Southern	Buccaneer Ballpark	12–4	Culp (W; 1–0)	123	1–1	–
February 11	vs. Kennesaw State	Buccaneer Ballpark	5–3	Thies (W; 1–0)	63	2–1	–
February 12	vs. Washington State	Buccaneer Ballpark	3–9	Holst (L; 0–2)	70	2–2	–
February 17	at Louisiana-Monroe	Warhawk Field	5–1	Scherzer (W; 1–0)	145	3–2	–
February 17	at Louisiana-Monroe	Warhawk Field	11–0	Culp (W; 2–0)	245	4–2	–
February 24	at Florida	McKethan Stadium	14–5	Scherzer (W; 2–0)	4,372	5–2	–
February 25	vs. Wake Forest	McKethan Stadium	3–4	Culp (L; 2–1)	380	5–3	–
February 26	vs. Ohio State	McKethan Stadium	2–4	Crow (L; 0–1)	325	5–4	–

March
Date	Opponent	Site/stadium	Score	MU Decision	Attendance	Overall record	Big 12 record
March 1	Illinois State	Taylor Stadium	18–5	Zagone (W; 1–0)	879	6–4	–
March 3	Milwaukee	Taylor Stadium	14–3	Scherzer (W; 3–0)	1,028	7–4	–
March 4	Milwaukee	Taylor Stadium	9–5	Culp (W; 3–1)	526	8–4	–
March 5	Milwaukee	Taylor Stadium	2–7	Crow (L; 0–2)	376	8–5	–
March 7	St. Louis	Taylor Stadium	16–0	Holst (W; 1–2)	423	9–5	–
March 10	Purdue	Taylor Stadium	0–7	Scherzer (L; 3–1)	1,563	9–6	–
March 11	Purdue	Taylor Stadium	22–2	Culp (W; 4–1)	1,346	10–6	–
March 12	Purdue	Taylor Stadium	6–8	Wendte (L; 0–1)	598	10–7	–
March 17	at Texas A&M	Olsen Field	3–1	Culp (W; 5–1)	4,172	11–7	1–0
March 18	at Texas A&M	Olsen Field	6–5	Cales (W; 1–0)	3,862	12–7	2–0
March 19	at Texas A&M	Olsen Field	3–0	Zagone (W; 2–0)	3,457	13–7	3–0
March 24	Kansas State	Taylor Stadium	3–5	Culp (L; 5–2)	457	13–8	3–1
March 25	Kansas State	Taylor Stadium	9–5	Wendte (W; 1–1)	627	14–8	4–1
March 26	Kansas State	Taylor Stadium	6–3	Cales (W; 2–0)	884	15–8	5–1
March 27	at SE Missouri State	Capaha Field	2–3	Parker (L; 0–1)	2,917	16–8	–
March 30	at Kansas	Hoglund Ballpark	3–0	Culp (W; 6–2)	1,821	17–8	6–1

April
Date	Opponent	Site/stadium	Score	MU Decision	Attendance	Overall record	Big 12 record
April 1	at Kansas	Hoglund Ballpark	2–3	Cales (L; 2–1)	1,971	16–10	6–2
April 2	at Kansas	Hoglund Ballpark	6–9	Zagone (L; 2–1)	1,811	16–11	6–3
April 7	Nebraska	Taylor Stadium	3–6	Culp (L; 6–3)	1,811	16–12	6–4
April 8	Nebraska	Taylor Stadium	2–5	Cales (L; 2–2)	1,358	16–13	6–5
April 9	Nebraska	Taylor Stadium	7–13	Crow (L; 0–3)	1,324	16–14	6–6
April 12	Se Missouri State	Taylor Stadium	5–9	Thies (L; 1–1)	467	16–15	–
April 14	at Oklahoma	Mitchell Park	4–6	Culp (L; 6–4)	985	16–16	6–7
April 15	at Oklahoma	Mitchell Park	6–8	Parker (L; 0–2	1,042	16–17	6–8
April 16	at Oklahoma	Mitchell Park	6–7	Parker (L; 0–3)	801	16–18	6–9
April 19	Saint Louis	T.R. Hughes Ballpark	4–0	Zagone (W; 3–1)	1,197	17–18	–
April 21	Oklahoma State	Taylor Stadium	9–2	Culp (W; 7–4)	718	18–18	7–9
April 22	Oklahoma State	Taylor Stadium	0–5	Crow (L; 0–4)	581	18–19	7–10
April 23	Oklahoma State	Taylor Stadium	2–3	Zagone (L; 3–2)	581	18–20	7–11
April 26	vs. SE Missouri State	CommunityAmerica Ballpark	14–3	Parker (W; 1–3)	345	19–20	–
April 28	Baylor	Taylor Stadium	7–0	Culp (W; 8–4)	356	20–20	8–11
April 29	Baylor	Taylor Stadium	4–5	Parker (L; 1–4)	488	20–21	8–12
April 30	Baylor	Taylor Stadium	3–1	Scherzer (W; 4–1)	574	21–21	9–12

May
Date	Opponent	Site/stadium	Score	MU Decision	Attendance	Overall record	Big 12 record
May 2	at Missouri State	Hammons Field	2–1	Wendte (W; 2–1)	3,892	22–21	–
May 5	Mississippi Valley	Taylor Stadium	12–1	Culp (W; 9–4)	515	23–21	–
May 6	Mississippi Valley	Taylor Stadium	19–2	Scherzer (W; 5–1)	598	24–21	–
May 7	Mississippi Valley	Taylor Stadium	19–1	Gibson (W; 6–3)	4,983	25–21	–
May 12	at Texas Tech	Dan Law Field	1–13	Culp (L; 9–5)	3,218	25–22	9–13
May 13	at Texas Tech	Dan Law Field	4–5	Cales (L; 2–3)	2,789	25–23	9–14
May 14	at Texas Tech	Dan Law Field	2–3	Zagone (L; 4–3)	2,822	25–25	9–15
May 17	vs. Illinois	T.R. Hughes Ballpark	14–2	Culp (W; 10–5)	1,219	26–25	–
May 19	Texas	Taylor Stadium	6–5	Scherzer (W; 6–1)	1,519	27–25	10–15
May 20	Texas	Taylor Stadium	8–5	Cales (L; 2–3)	1,942	28–25	11–15
May 21	Texas	Taylor Stadium	7–5	Parker (W; 2–4)	1,411	29–25	12–15

Postseason

Big 12 Tournament
Date	Opponent	Site/stadium	Score	MU Decision	Attendance	Overall record
May 24	vs. Oklahoma State	Chickasaw Bricktown Ballpark	9–5	Culp (W; 11–5)	6,189	30–24
May 26	vs. Oklahoma	Chickasaw Bricktown Ballpark	11–0	Scherzer (W; 7–1)	4,500	31–24
May 27	vs. Kansas	Chickasaw Bricktown Ballpark	3–4	Wendte (L; 2–2)	9,491	31–25

NCAA tournament: Pepperdine Regional
Date	Opponent	Site/stadium	Score	MU Decision	Attendance	Overall record
June 2	vs. Pepperdine	Eddy D. Field Stadium	2–3	Scherzer (L; 7–2)	1,017	31–26
June 3	vs. UC-Irvine	Eddy D. Field Stadium	5–4	Parker (W; 3–4)	442	32–26
June 4	vs. UCLA	Eddy D. Field Stadium	2–1	Zagone (W; 6–3)	685	33–26
June 4	vs. Pepperdine	Eddy D. Field Stadium	4–1	Crow (W; 1–4)	694	34–26
June 5	vs. Pepperdine	Eddy D. Field Stadium	8–3	Parker (W; 4–4)	467	35–26

NCAA tournament: Fullerton Super Regional
Date	Opponent	Site/stadium	Score	MU Decision	Attendance	Overall record
June 9	vs. Cal State Fullerton	Goodwin Field	1–7	Scherzer (L; 7–3)	3,355	35–27
June 10	vs. Cal State Fullerton	Goodwin Field	1–9	Culp (L; 11–6)	3,370	35–28

=== Awards and honors ===
Nathan Culp

- All-Midwest Region
- All-Big 12 First Team
- 2x Big 12 Pitcher of the Week (4/4 & 5/2)

Evan Frey

- All-Big 12 Honorable Mention

Jacob Priday

- All-Big 12 First Team
- Big 12 Player of the Week (3/14)
- Pepsi Baseball Classic All-Tournament Team

Max Scherzer

- All-Midwest Region
- All-Big 12 Honorable Mention
- Big 12 Pitcher of the Week (2/28)
- Pepsi Classic All-Tournament Team

Zane Taylor

- All-Big 12 Honorable Mention
- Pepsi Classic All-Tournament Team

Travis Wendte

- All-Big 12 Honorable Mention

=== Tigers in the 2006 MLB draft ===
The following members of the Missouri Tigers baseball program were drafted in the 2006 Major League Baseball draft.

Player	Position	Round	Overall	MLB Team
Max Scherzer	RHP	1st	11th	Arizona Diamondbacks
Nathan Culp	LHP	4th	123rd	San Diego Padres
Brett Reynolds	RHP	17th	507th	Arizona Diamondbacks
Hunter Mense	OF	17th	515th	Florida Marlins
Taylor Parker	LHP	21st	629th	Chicago Cubs
Travis Wendte	RHP	24th	722nd	Milwaukee Brewers

== 2007 ==
2007 Missouri Tigers baseball

Columbia Regional, 2–2
- Conference: Big 12 Conference
- Record: 42–18 (19–8 Big 12)
- Head coach: Tim Jamieson (13th year)
- Assistant coach: Evan Pratte (10th year); Tony Vitello (5th year)
- Home stadium: Taylor Stadium

2007 Big 12 Conference baseball standings
	Conf.				Overall
Team	W		L	PCT	W		L	PCT
No. 17 Texas ‍†‍‍^{y}	21	–	6	.778	46	–	17	.730
No. 27 Missouri ‍‍‍^{y}	19	–	8	.704	42	–	18	.700
No. 21 Oklahoma State ‍‍‍^{y}	16	–	11	.593	42	–	21	.667
Nebraska ‍‍‍^{y}	14	–	13	.519	32	–	27	.542
No. 14 Texas A&M ‍‍‡‍^{y}	13	–	13	.500	48	–	19	.716
Baylor ‍‍‍^{y}	12	–	15	.444	35	–	27	.565
Oklahoma ‍‍‍	11	–	16	.407	34	–	24	.586
Kansas State ‍‍‍	10	–	16	.385	34	–	24	.586
Kansas ‍‍‍	9	–	17	.346	28	–	30	.483
Texas Tech ‍‍‍	8	–	18	.308	28	–	27	.509
† – Conference champion ‡ – Tournament champion y – Invited to the NCAA tournament Rankings from Collegiate Baseball

The 2007 Missouri Tigers baseball team represented the University of Missouri in the 2007 NCAA Division I baseball season. The Tigers played their home games at Taylor Stadium. The team was coached by Tim Jamieson in his 13th season at Missouri.

The Tigers finished second in the Big 12 and earned a #1 seed and hosted an NCAA Regional, where the Tigers were eliminated by Louisville.

=== Roster ===
2007 Missouri Tigers baseball team
Players
Coaches

#	Pos.	Name	B/T	Height	Weight	Year	Home town
47	RHP	Ryan Allen	R/R	6 ft 2 in (1.88 m)	195 lb (88 kg)	Fr	Stillwater, OK
16	INF	Gary Arndt	R/R	5 ft 10 in (1.78 m)	188 lb (85 kg)	Sr	Racine, WI
41	RHP	Ian Berger	R/R	5 ft 10 in (1.78 m)	195 lb (88 kg)	So	Oak Park, IL
4	INF	Brock Bond	S/R	5 ft 10 in (1.78 m)	195 lb (88 kg)	Jr	St. Louis, MO
5	OF	Kurt Calvert	L/L	5 ft 9 in (1.75 m)	167 lb (76 kg)	Jr	Wildwood, MO
14	C	Trevor Coleman	S/R	6 ft 1 in (1.85 m)	210 lb (95 kg)	Fr	Dripping Springs, TX
40	LHP	Brant Combs	L/L	6 ft 2 in (1.88 m)	200 lb (91 kg)	So	Olathe, KS
43	RHP	Aaron Crow	R/R	6 ft 2 in (1.88 m)	201 lb (91 kg)	So	Wakarusa, KS
99	RHP	Travis Crow	R/R	6 ft 3 in (1.91 m)	218 lb (99 kg)	Fr	Wakarusa, KS
18	OF	Sean Finley	L/R	6 ft 5 in (1.96 m)	215 lb (98 kg)	Fr	Prairie Village, KS
6	INF	Lee Fischer	R/R	6 ft 1 in (1.85 m)	165 lb (75 kg)	Jr	Overland Park, KS
10	RHP	Greg Folgia	S/R	5 ft 10 in (1.78 m)	195 lb (88 kg)	Fr	North Wales, PA
3	OF	Evan Frey	L/L	6 ft 0 in (1.83 m)	173 lb (78 kg)	Jr	Edwardsville, IL
32	LHP	Ryan Gargano	L/L	5 ft 10 in (1.78 m)	185 lb (84 kg)	So	Blue Springs, MO
44	RHP	Kyle Gibson	R/R	6 ft 5 in (1.96 m)	183 lb (83 kg)	Fr	Greenfield, IN
8	LHP	Scooter Hicks	L/L	5 ft 9 in (1.75 m)	171 lb (78 kg)	So	Overland Park, KS
38	RHP	Stephan Holst	R/R	6 ft 4 in (1.93 m)	223 lb (101 kg)	Sr	Independence, MO
2	OF	John Kruse	R/R	5 ft 11 in (1.8 m)	203 lb (92 kg)	So	Columbia, MO
20	OF	Ryan Lollis	L/L	6 ft 1 in (1.85 m)	191 lb (87 kg)	So	Houston, TX
54	LHP	Vinny Losorelli	L/L	6 ft 2 in (1.88 m)	211 lb (96 kg)	Fr	Chesterfield, MO
7	INF	Kyle Mach	R/R	5 ft 10 in (1.78 m)	187 lb (85 kg)	So	Chesterfield, MO
27	LHP	Phil McCormick	L/L	6 ft 1 in (1.85 m)	167 lb (76 kg)	Fr	Wildwood, MO
28	INF	John McKee	R/R	6 ft 2 in (1.88 m)	222 lb (101 kg)	Sr	St. Louis, MO
45	RHP	Andrew Mueller	R/R	6 ft 2 in (1.88 m)	175 lb (79 kg)	RS Fr	Columbia, MO
26	C	Dan Pietroburgo	R/R	6 ft 0 in (1.83 m)	195 lb (88 kg)	Jr	Belleville, IL
51	OF	Jacob Priday	R/R	6 ft 1 in (1.85 m)	220 lb (100 kg)	Jr	Sikeston, MO
25	C	Dan Quinn	R/R	6 ft 1 in (1.85 m)	235 lb (107 kg)	Sr	Hamburg, NY
17	OF	Aaron Senne	L/L	6 ft 3 in (1.91 m)	187 lb (85 kg)	Fr	Rochester, MN
46	LHP	John Thies	L/L	6 ft 1 in (1.85 m)	216 lb (98 kg)	Jr	Cape Girardeau, MO
35	RHP	Lendsey Thomson	R/R	5 ft 11 in (1.8 m)	212 lb (96 kg)	Jr	Springfield, MO
11	C	Dan Wise	R/R	5 ft 10 in (1.78 m)	207 lb (94 kg)	RS Fr	Olathe, KS
55	LHP	Rick Zagone	L/L	6 ft 2 in (1.88 m)	215 lb (98 kg)	So	Crystal Lake, IL

Head coach

9 Tim Jamieson (13th year)

Assistant coach(es)

23 Evan Pratte (10th year)
22 Tony Vitello (5th year)

Legend

- (C) Team captain
- (S) Suspended
- (I) Ineligible
- Injured
- Current redshirt

=== Schedule ===
2007 Missouri Tigers baseball game log
Regular season

February
Date	Opponent	Site/stadium	Score	MU Decision	Attendance	Overall record	Big 12 record
February 9	at FIU	University Park Stadium	12–6	Zagone (W; 1–0)	414	1–0	–
February 10	at FIU	University Park Stadium	15–7	Mohr (W; 1–0)	267	2–0	–
February 11	at FIU	University Park Stadium	3–2	Berger (W; 1–0)	319	3–0	–
February 15	at Arizona State	Packard Stadium	1–7	Berger (L; 1–1)	2,587	3–1	–
February 16	vs. Arizona State	Surprise Stadium	3–2	Folgia (W; 1–0)	934	4–1	–
February 17	vs. Gonzaga	Surprise Stadium	10–3	A. Crow (W; 1–0)	878	5–1	–
February 18	vs. Oregon State	Surprise Stadium	2–9	Gibson (L; 0–1)	776	5–2	–
February 23	vs. BYU	USA Stadium	1–4	Folgia (L; 1–1)	385	5–3	–
February 24	vs. Akron	USA Stadium	5–8	Gibson (L; 0–2)	124	5–4	–
February 25	vs. Navy	USA Stadium	5–0	Holst (W; 1–0)	257	6–4	–
February 25	vs. Memphis	USA Stadium	1–5	Mohr (L; 1–1)	648	6–5	–

March
Date	Opponent	Site/stadium	Score	MU Decision	Attendance	Overall record	Big 12 record
March 2	Youngstown State	Taylor Stadium	10–5	Zagone (W; 2–0)	420	7–5	–
March 4	Youngstown State	Taylor Stadium	11–0	A. Crow (W; 2–0)	238	8–5	–
March 4	Youngstown State	Taylor Stadium	11–0	Gibson (W; 1–2)	465	9–5	–
March 6	Louisiana-Monroe	Taylor Stadium	5–4	Combs (W; 1–0)	418	10–5	–
March 7	Louisiana-Monroe	Taylor Stadium	4–2	Hicks (W; 1–0)	351	11–5	–
March 10	vs. Texas State	Patriot Field	14–4	A. Crow (W; 3–0)	124	12–5	–
March 10	at Dallas Baptist	Patriot Field	11–7	Folgia (W; 2–1)	325	13–5	–
March 14	St. Louis	Taylor Stadium	19–1	Berger (W; 2–1)	572	14–5	–
March 15	Western Illinois	Taylor Stadium	6–3	Hicks (W; 2–0)	332	15–5	–
March 16	Cleveland State	Taylor Stadium	6–3	A. Crow (W; 4–0)	435	16–5	–
March 17	Cleveland State	Taylor Stadium	9–2	Zagone (W; 3–0)	252	17–5	–
March 18	Cleveland State	Taylor Stadium	6–4	Gibson (W; 2–2)	464	18–5	–
March 23	at Nebraska	Taylor Stadium	5–1	Gibson (W; 3–2)	4,589	19–5	1–0
March 24	at Nebraska	Taylor Stadium	4–3	Zagone (W; 4–0)	3,557	20–5	2–0
March 25	at Nebraska	Taylor Stadium	1–16	Folgia (L; 2–2)	5,003	20–6	2–1
March 27	at Creighton	Taylor Stadium	3–4	Combs (L; 1–1)	347	20–7	–
March 30	Kansas	Taylor Stadium	5–7	Gibson (L; 3–3)	628	20–8	3–2
March 31	Kansas	Taylor Stadium	8–7	Zagone (W; 5–0)	605	21–8	4–2

April
Date	Opponent	Site/stadium	Score	MU Decision	Attendance	Overall record	Big 12 record
April 1	Kansas	Taylor Stadium	10–9	Gibson (W; 4–3)	871	22–8	4–2
April 6	at Kansas State	Tointon Family Stadium	0–12	A. Crow (L; 4–1)	368	22–9	4–3
April 7	at Kansas State	Tointon Family Stadium	3–0	Zagone (W; 6–0)	518	23–9	5–3
April 8	at Kansas State	Tointon Family Stadium	7–6	Hicks (W; 3–0)	396	24–9	6–3
April 14	Texas A&M	Taylor Stadium	1–3	A. Crow (L; 4–2)	448	24–10	6–4
April 14	Texas A&M	Taylor Stadium	7–6	Gibson (W; 5–3)	491	25–10	7–4
April 15	Texas A&M	Taylor Stadium	2–5	Folgia (L; 2–3)	728	25–11	7–5
April 17	Missouri State	Hammons Field	3–1	Berger (W; 3–1)	3,712	26–11	–
April 20	at Baylor	Baylor Ballpark	11–4	A. Crow (W; 5–2)	3,218	27–11	8–5
April 21	Baylor	Baylor Ballpark	14–11	Folgia (W; 3–3)	4,398	28–11	9–5
April 22	Baylor	Baylor Ballpark	3–8	Holst (L; 1–1)	2,852	28–12	9–6
April 27	Texas Tech	Taylor Stadium	10–4	A. Crow (W; 6–2)	777	29–12	10–6
April 28	Texas Tech	Taylor Stadium	12–7	Folgia (W; 4–3)	1,347	30–12	11–6
April 29	Texas Tech	Taylor Stadium	6–5	Hicks (W; 4–0)	1,152	31–12	12–6

May
Date	Opponent	Site/stadium	Score	MU Decision	Attendance	Overall record	Big 12 record
May 4	at Texas	Disch-Falk Field	7–6	Folgia (W; 5–3)	4,851	32–12	13–6
May 5	at Texas	Disch-Falk Field	1–5	Zagone (L; 6–1)	4,971	32–13	13–7
May 6	Texas	Disch-Falk Field	5–4	Gibson (W; 6–3)	4,983	33–13	14–7
May 11	Oklahoma	Taylor Stadium	13–3	A. Crow (W; 7–2)	1,105	34–13	15–7
May 12	Oklahoma	Taylor Stadium	1–5	Zagone (L; 6–2	1,256	34–14	15–8
May 13	Oklahoma	Taylor Stadium	10–8	Berger (W; 4–1)	835	35–14	16–8
May 15	vs. Illinois	T.R. Hughes Ballpark	12–5	Holst (W; 2–1)	1,702	36–14	–
May 18	at Oklahoma State	Reynolds Stadium	9–6	A. Crow (W; 8–2)	2,672	37–14	17–8
May 19	at Oklahoma State	Reynolds Stadium	8–5	Gibson (W; 7–3)	1,608	38–14	18–8
May 20	at Oklahoma State	Taylor Stadium	8–5	Berger (W; 5–1)	1,108	39–14	19–8

Postseason

Big 12 Tournament
Date	Opponent	Site/stadium	Score	MU Decision	Attendance	Overall record
May 23	vs. Oklahoma	Chickasaw Bricktown Ballpark	2–7	Holst (L; 2–2)	6,206	39–15
May 25	vs. Baylor	Chickasaw Bricktown Ballpark	5–10	A. Crow (L; 8–3)	8,785	39–16
May 26	vs. Oklahoma State	Chickasaw Bricktown Ballpark	13–1	Zagone (W; 7–2)	7,370	40–16

NCAA tournament: Columbia Regional
Date	Opponent	Site/stadium	Score	MU Decision	Attendance	Overall record
June 1	vs. Kent State	Taylor Stadium	10–2	A. Crow (W; 9–3)	3,481	41–16
June 2	vs. Louisville	Taylor Stadium	7–5	Gibson (W; 8–3)	3,630	42–16
June 3	vs. Louisville	Taylor Stadium	3–4	Folgia (L; 5–4)	3,457	42–17
June 4	vs. Louisville	Taylor Stadium	6–16	A. Crow (L; 9–4)	2,199	42–18

=== Awards and honors ===
Trevor Coleman

- Freshman All-American
- Big 12 Freshman of the Year

Aaron Crow

- All-Big 12 First Team

Evan Frey

- All-Big 12 Second Team
- Big 12 Player of the Week (5/22)

Kyle Gibson

- All-Big 12 Honorable Mention

Ryan Lollis

- All-Regional Team

Kyle Mach

- All-Big 12 Honorable Mention

Jacob Priday

- All-Big 12 First Team
- All-Regional Team
- Big 12 Player of the Week (4/30)

Aaron Senne

- All-Regional Team

Rick Zagone

- All-Big 12 Honorable Mention
- National Pitcher of the Week (5/9)
- Big 12 Pitcher of the Week (5/9)

=== Tigers in the 2007 MLB draft ===
The following members of the Missouri Tigers baseball program were drafted in the 2007 Major League Baseball draft.

Player	Position	Round	Overall	MLB Team
Evan Frey	OF	10th	313th	Arizona Diamondbacks
Brock Bond	2B	24th	734th	San Francisco Giants

== 2008 ==
2008 Missouri Tigers baseball

Coral Gables Regional, 1–2
- Conference: Big 12 Conference
- Record: 39–21 (16–11 Big 12)
- Head coach: Tim Jamieson (14th year)
- Assistant coach: Evan Pratte (11th year); Tony Vitello (6th year)
- Home stadium: Taylor Stadium

2008 Big 12 Conference baseball standings
	Conf.						Overall
Team	W		L		T	PCT	W		L		T	PCT
No. 10 Texas A&M ‍†‍‍^{y}	19	–	8	–	0	.704	46	–	19	–	0	.708
No. 18 Oklahoma State ‍‍‍^{y}	18	–	9	–	0	.667	44	–	18	–	0	.710
No. 22 Nebraska ‍‍‍^{y}	17	–	9	–	1	.648	41	–	16	–	1	.716
No. 21 Missouri ‍‍‍^{y}	16	–	11	–	0	.593	39	–	21	–	0	.650
No. 25 Texas ‍‍‡‍^{y}	15	–	12	–	0	.556	37	–	24	–	0	.607
Baylor ‍‍‍	11	–	16	–	0	.407	32	–	26	–	0	.552
Kansas State ‍‍‍	11	–	16	–	0	.407	29	–	29	–	0	.500
Oklahoma ‍‍‍^{y}	9	–	17	–	1	.352	36	–	26	–	1	.579
Kansas ‍‍‍	9	–	18	–	0	.333	30	–	27	–	0	.526
Texas Tech ‍‍‍	9	–	18	–	0	.333	25	–	30	–	0	.455
† – Conference champion ‡ – Tournament champion y – Invited to the NCAA tournament As of June 30, 2008; Rankings from Collegiate Baseball

The 2008 Missouri Tigers baseball team represented the University of Missouri in the 2008 NCAA Division I baseball season. The Tigers played their home games at Taylor Stadium. The team was coached by Tim Jamieson in his 13th season at Missouri.

The Tigers reached the NCAA tournament for the sixth straight season, where the Tigers were eliminated by Ole Miss in the Coral Gables Regional.

=== Roster ===
2008 Missouri Tigers baseball team
Players
Coaches

#	Pos.	Name	B/T	Height	Weight	Year	Home town
47	RHP	Ryan Allen	R/R	6 ft 2 in (1.88 m)	200 lb (91 kg)	So	Stillwater, OK
4	C	Ryan Ampleman	R/R	5 ft 8 in (1.73 m)	175 lb (79 kg)	Fr	St. Peters, MO
41	RHP	Ian Berger	R/R	6 ft 1 in (1.85 m)	206 lb (93 kg)	Jr	Oak Park, IL
40	RHP	Brad Buehler	S/R	6 ft 1 in (1.85 m)	204 lb (93 kg)	Fr	Festus, MO
5	OF	Kurt Calvert	L/L	5 ft 10 in (1.78 m)	170 lb (77 kg)	Sr	Wildwood, MO
16	RHP	Tyler Clark	R/R	6 ft 2 in (1.88 m)	196 lb (89 kg)	Fr	Springfield, MO
14	C	Trevor Coleman	S/R	6 ft 1 in (1.85 m)	214 lb (97 kg)	So	Dripping Springs, TX
43	RHP	Aaron Crow	R/R	6 ft 3 in (1.91 m)	195 lb (88 kg)	Jr	Wakarusa, KS
49	RHP	Erik Darkow	R/R	6 ft 5 in (1.96 m)	204 lb (93 kg)	Fr	Columbia, MO
35	RHP	Ryan Dawson	R/R	6 ft 3 in (1.91 m)	195 lb (88 kg)	Fr	Warrensburg, MO
21	LHP	Kelly Fick	L/L	6 ft 2 in (1.88 m)	191 lb (87 kg)	Fr	Linn, MO
18	OF	Sean Finley	L/R	6 ft 5 in (1.96 m)	215 lb (98 kg)	RS Fr	Prairie Village, KS
6	INF	Lee Fischer	R/R	6 ft 0 in (1.83 m)	170 lb (77 kg)	Sr	Overland Park, KS
10	INF	Greg Folgia	S/R	5 ft 11 in (1.8 m)	195 lb (88 kg)	So	North Wales, PA
32	LHP	Ryan Gargano	L/L	5 ft 10 in (1.78 m)	185 lb (84 kg)	Jr	Blue Springs, MO
44	RHP	Kyle Gibson	R/R	6 ft 6 in (1.98 m)	195 lb (88 kg)	So	Greenfield, IN
44	RHP	Kyle Gibson	R/R	6 ft 6 in (1.98 m)	195 lb (88 kg)	So	Greenfield, IN
11	INF	Steve Gray	L/R	6 ft 1 in (1.85 m)	196 lb (89 kg)	Jr	Boise, ID
8	LHP	Scooter Hicks	L/L	5 ft 9 in (1.75 m)	171 lb (78 kg)	So	Overland Park, KS
42	INF	Austin Holt	S/R	5 ft 9 in (1.75 m)	166 lb (75 kg)	Jr	Kansas City, MO
2	OF	Russell LaFleur	S/R	5 ft 10 in (1.78 m)	162 lb (73 kg)	Fr	Houston, TX
20	OF	Ryan Lollis	L/L	6 ft 1 in (1.85 m)	190 lb (86 kg)	Jr	Houston, TX
7	INF	Kyle Mach	R/R	5 ft 11 in (1.8 m)	190 lb (86 kg)	Jr	Chesterfield, MO
13	C	Cole Mazurek	R/R	5 ft 10 in (1.78 m)	174 lb (79 kg)	Fr	Overland Park, KS
27	LHP	Phil McCormick	L/L	6 ft 0 in (1.83 m)	185 lb (84 kg)	RS Fr	Wildwood, MO
00	INF	Tex Meyr	R/R	5 ft 11 in (1.8 m)	187 lb (85 kg)	Fr	Jackson, MO
45	RHP	Andrew Mueller	R/R	6 ft 2 in (1.88 m)	180 lb (82 kg)	RS So	Columbia, MO
26	C	Dan Pietroburgo	R/R	5 ft 11 in (1.8 m)	192 lb (87 kg)	Sr	Belleville, IL
51	OF	Jacob Priday	R/R	6 ft 1 in (1.85 m)	215 lb (98 kg)	Sr	Sikeston, MO
19	INF	T. J. Scheiber	R/R	6 ft 0 in (1.83 m)	181 lb (82 kg)	Fr	Blue Springs, MO
25	OF	Jonah Schmidt	R/R	6 ft 4 in (1.93 m)	220 lb (100 kg)	Fr	St. Louis, MO
17	OF	Aaron Senne	L/L	6 ft 2 in (1.88 m)	201 lb (91 kg)	So	Rochester, MN
46	RHP	Nick Tepesch	R/R	6 ft 5 in (1.96 m)	224 lb (102 kg)	Fr	Blue Springs, MO
3	INF	Andrew Thigpen	R/R	5 ft 11 in (1.8 m)	190 lb (86 kg)	Fr	Midwest City, OK
30	RHP	Sean Young	R/R	6 ft 6 in (1.98 m)	189 lb (86 kg)	RS Fr	Doylestown, PA
55	LHP	Rick Zagone	L/L	6 ft 3 in (1.91 m)	207 lb (94 kg)	Jr	Crystal Lake, IL

Head coach

9 Tim Jamieson (14th year)

Assistant coach(es)

23 Evan Pratte (11th year)
22 Tony Vitello (6th year)

Legend

- (C) Team captain
- (S) Suspended
- (I) Ineligible
- Injured
- Current redshirt

=== Schedule ===
2008 Missouri Tigers baseball game log
Regular season

February
Date	Opponent	Score	Overall record	Big 12 record
February 22	vs. UConn	7–1	1–0	–
February 23	vs. Michigan State	14–9	2–0	–
February 24	at Stetson	9–5	3–0	–
February 25	vs. Central Florida	9–10	3–1	–
February 29	vs. California	7–5	4–1	–
February 29	vs. San Diego State	3–1	5–1	–

March
Date	Opponent	Score	Overall record	Big 12 record
March 1	at San Diego	4–5	5–2	–
March 2	vs. Cal Poly	6–3	6–2	–
March 8	Indiana State	5–1	7–2	–
March 9	Indiana State	9–8	8–2	–
March 9	Indiana State	6–2	9–2	–
March 14	Toledo	6–0	10–2	–
March 15	Toledo	10–0	11–2	–
March 16	Toledo	3–1	12–2	–
March 16	Toledo	11–6	13–2	–
March 18	South Dakota State	13–1	14–2	–
March 19	South Dakota State	9–4	15–2	–
March 21	Baylor	7–0	16–2	1–0
March 22	Baylor	3–0	17–2	2–0
March 23	Baylor	12–2	18–2	3–0
March 25	at Minnesota	17–8	19–2	–
March 26	at Minnesota	5–12	19–3	–
March 28	at Texas Tech	1–0	20–3	4–0
March 29	at Texas Tech	2–3	20–4	4–1
March 30	at Texas Tech	11–15	20–5	4–2

April
Date	Opponent	Score	Overall record	Big 12 record
April 1	Western Illinois	3–5	20–6	4–2
April 2	Lincoln	10–2	21–6	4–2
April 4	Oklahoma State	3–0	22–6	5–2
April 5	Oklahoma State	2–6	22–7	5–3
April 6	Oklahoma State	6–8	22–8	5–4
April 9	at Missouri State	8–4	23–8	5–4
April 11	Texas	31–12	24–8	6–4
April 12	Texas	13–2	25–8	7–4
April 13	Texas	2–9	25–9	7–5
April 16	William Woods	16–9	26–9	7–5
April 18	at Oklahoma	9–4	27–9	8–5
April 19	at Oklahoma	6–5	28–9	9–5
April 20	at Oklahoma	4–22	28–10	9–6
April 22	Eastern Illinois	8–6	29–10	9–6
April 23	Southern Illinois	1–2	29–11	9–6
April 25	at Texas A&M	8–9	29–12	9–7
April 26	at Texas A&M	0–15	29–13	9–8
April 27	at Texas A&M	2–3	29–14	9–9
April 29	vs. Kansas	0–3	29–15	9–9

May
Date	Opponent	Score	Overall record	Big 12 record
May 2	Kansas State	13–10	30–15	10–9
May 3	Kansas State	11–7	31–15	11–9
May 4	Kansas State	3–4	31–16	11–10
May 6	Creighton	5–4	32–16	11–10
May 9	at Kansas	5–3	33–16	12–10
May 10	at Kansas	6–7	33–17	12–11
May 11	at Kansas	12–1	34–17	13–11
May 16	at Nebraska	8–1	35–17	14–11
May 17	at Nebraska	22–9	36–17	15–11
May 18	at Nebraska	7–3	37–17	16–11

Postseason

Big 12 Tournament
Date	Opponent	Site/stadium	Score	Overall record
May 21	vs. Texas	Chickasaw Bricktown Ballpark	2–7	38–17
May 22	vs. Oklahoma	Chickasaw Bricktown Ballpark	3–4	38–18
May 24	vs. Texas A&M	Chickasaw Bricktown Ballpark	2–3	38–19

NCAA tournament: Columbia Regional
Date	Opponent	Site/stadium	Score	Overall record
May 30	vs. Ole Miss	Mark Light Field	7–0	39–19
May 31	vs. Miami	Mark Light Field	5–6	39–20
June 1	vs. Ole Miss	Mark Light Field	6–9	39–21

=== Tigers in the 2008 MLB draft ===
The following members of the Missouri Tigers baseball program were drafted in the 2008 Major League Baseball draft.

Player	Position	Round	Overall	MLB Team
Aaron Crow	RHP	1st	9th	Washington Nationals
Rick Zagone	LHP	6th	176th	Baltimore Orioles
Jacob Priday	OF	11th	332nd	Houston Astros
Ryan Lollis	OF	20th	613th	Detroit Tigers
Kurt Calvert	OF	32nd	971st	Chicago Cubs
Lee Fischer	SS	46th	1377th	Chicago White Sox

== 2009 ==
2009 Missouri Tigers baseball

Oxford Regional, 1–2
- Conference: Big 12 Conference
- Record: 35–27 (16–11 Big 12)
- Head coach: Tim Jamieson (15th year)
- Assistant coach: Evan Pratte (12th year); Tony Vitello (7th year)
- Home stadium: Taylor Stadium

2009 Big 12 Conference baseball standings
	Conf.				Overall
Team	W		L	PCT	W		L	PCT
No. 2 Texas ‍†‍‡‍^{y}	17	–	9	.654	50	–	16	.758
No. 19 Oklahoma ‍‍‍^{y}	17	–	10	.630	43	–	20	.683
Missouri ‍‍‍^{y}	16	–	11	.593	35	–	27	.565
No. 22 Kansas State ‍‍‍^{y}	14	–	11	.560	43	–	18	.705
Kansas ‍‍‍^{y}	15	–	12	.556	39	–	24	.619
Texas A&M ‍‍‍^{y}	14	–	13	.519	37	–	24	.607
Texas Tech ‍‍‍	12	–	15	.444	25	–	32	.439
Baylor ‍‍‍^{y}	10	–	16	.385	30	–	26	.536
No. 27 Oklahoma State ‍‍‍^{y}	9	–	16	.360	34	–	24	.586
Nebraska ‍‍‍	8	–	19	.296	25	–	28	.472
† – Conference champion ‡ – Tournament champion y – Invited to the NCAA tournament As of June 30, 2009; Rankings from Collegiate Baseball

The 2009 Missouri Tigers baseball team represented the University of Missouri in the 2009 NCAA Division I baseball season. The Tigers played their home games at Taylor Stadium. The team was coached by Tim Jamieson in his 15th season at Missouri.

The Tigers reached the NCAA tournament for the seventh straight season, where the Tigers were eliminated by Western Kentucky in the Oxford Regional.

=== Roster ===
2008 Missouri Tigers baseball team
Players
Coaches

#	Pos.	Name	B/T	Height	Weight	Year	Home town
47	RHP	Ryan Allen	R/R	6 ft 2 in (1.88 m)	200 lb (91 kg)	Jr	Stillwater, OK
4	C	Ryan Ampleman	R/R	5 ft 8 in (1.73 m)	175 lb (79 kg)	So	St. Peters, MO
41	RHP	Ian Berger	R/R	6 ft 1 in (1.85 m)	206 lb (93 kg)	Sr	Oak Park, IL
40	RHP	Brad Buehler	S/R	6 ft 1 in (1.85 m)	204 lb (93 kg)	So	Festus, MO
16	RHP	Tyler Clark	R/R	6 ft 2 in (1.88 m)	196 lb (89 kg)	So	Springfield, MO
29	RHP	Ryan Clubb	R/R	6 ft 3 in (1.91 m)	198 lb (90 kg)	So	Eureka, MO
14	C	Trevor Coleman	S/R	6 ft 1 in (1.85 m)	214 lb (97 kg)	Jr	Dripping Springs, TX
20	RHP	Jeff Emens	R/R	6 ft 0 in (1.83 m)	173 lb (78 kg)	So	Plano, TX
21	LHP	Kelly Fick	L/L	6 ft 2 in (1.88 m)	191 lb (87 kg)	So	Linn, MO
10	INF	Greg Folgia	S/R	5 ft 11 in (1.8 m)	195 lb (88 kg)	Jr	North Wales, PA
32	LHP	Ryan Gargano	L/L	5 ft 10 in (1.78 m)	185 lb (84 kg)	Sr	Blue Springs, MO
37	OF	Ryan Gebhart	S/R	6 ft 0 in (1.83 m)	172 lb (78 kg)	So	Waco, TX
44	RHP	Kyle Gibson	R/R	6 ft 6 in (1.98 m)	195 lb (88 kg)	Jr	Greenfield, IN
11	INF	Steve Gray	L/R	6 ft 1 in (1.85 m)	196 lb (89 kg)	Sr	Boise, ID
8	LHP	Scooter Hicks	L/L	5 ft 9 in (1.75 m)	171 lb (78 kg)	Jr	Overland Park, KS
42	INF	Austin Holt	S/R	5 ft 9 in (1.75 m)	166 lb (75 kg)	Sr	Kansas City, MO
39	LHP	Brian Carr	L/L	6 ft 2 in (1.88 m)	182 lb (83 kg)	Fr	Phoenix, AZ
2	OF	Russell LaFleur	S/R	5 ft 10 in (1.78 m)	162 lb (73 kg)	So	Houston, TX
5	INF	Michael Liberto	R/R	5 ft 9 in (1.75 m)	165 lb (75 kg)	Sr	Harahan, LA
20	OF	Ryan Lollis	L/L	6 ft 1 in (1.85 m)	190 lb (86 kg)	Sr	Houston, TX
28	INF	Conner Mach	R/R	6 ft 0 in (1.83 m)	189 lb (86 kg)	So	Chesterfield, MO
7	INF	Kyle Mach	R/R	5 ft 11 in (1.8 m)	190 lb (86 kg)	Sr	Chesterfield, MO
27	LHP	Phil McCormick	L/L	6 ft 0 in (1.83 m)	185 lb (84 kg)	RS So	Wildwood, MO
36	INF	Garrison McLagan	L/L	5 ft 11 in (1.8 m)	191 lb (87 kg)	So	Columbia, MO
00	INF	Rex Meyr	R/R	5 ft 11 in (1.8 m)	187 lb (85 kg)	So	Jackson, MO
45	RHP	Andrew Mueller	R/R	6 ft 2 in (1.88 m)	180 lb (82 kg)	RS Jr	Columbia, MO
19	INF	T. J. Scheiber	R/R	6 ft 0 in (1.83 m)	181 lb (82 kg)	So	Blue Springs, MO
25	OF	Jonah Schmidt	R/R	6 ft 4 in (1.93 m)	220 lb (100 kg)	So	St. Louis, MO
17	OF	Aaron Senne	L/L	6 ft 2 in (1.88 m)	201 lb (91 kg)	Jr	Rochester, MN
46	RHP	Nick Tepesch	R/R	6 ft 5 in (1.96 m)	224 lb (102 kg)	So	Blue Springs, MO
3	INF	Andrew Thigpen	R/R	5 ft 11 in (1.8 m)	190 lb (86 kg)	So	Midwest City, OK
18	C	Ben Turner	R/R	6 ft 4 in (1.93 m)	220 lb (100 kg)	Fr	St. Charles, MO

Head coach

9 Tim Jamieson (15th year)

Assistant coach(es)

23 Evan Pratte (12th year)
22 Tony Vitello (7th year)

Legend

- (C) Team captain
- (S) Suspended
- (I) Ineligible
- Injured
- Current redshirt

=== Schedule ===
2009 Missouri Tigers baseball game log
Regular season

February
Date	Opponent	Score	Overall record	Big 12 record
February 20	vs. Nevada	12–1	1–0	–
February 21	vs. Gonzaga	3–9	1–1	–
February 22	vs. Nevada	4–8	1–2	–
February 22	vs. Gonzaga	9–13	1–3	–
February 24	at Arizona State	1–3	1–4	–
February 26	at Arizona State	1–2	1–5	–
February 27	vs. Oregon State	8–12	1–6	–
February 28	vs. Northern Illinois	2–5	1–7	–

March
Date	Opponent	Score	Overall record	Big 12 record
March 1	vs. Arizona State	5–2	2–7	–
March 4	Western Illinois	8–0	3–7	–
March 6	Ball State	4–1	4–7	–
March 7	Ball State	5–14	4–8	–
March 7	Ball State	18–4	5–8	–
March 8	Ball State	7–6	6–8	–
March 10	Western Illinois	18–4	7–8	–
March 14	at Texas	2–0	8–8	1–0
March 14	at Texas	0–5	8–9	1–1
March 15	at Texas	3–4	8–10	1–2
March 18	SIU Edwardsville	4–1	9–10	1–2
March 20	Texas A&M	3–2	10–10	2–2
March 21	Texas A&M	5–2	11–10	3–2
March 22	Texas A&M	5–6	11–11	3–3
March 24	Illinois-Chicago	4–6	11–12	3–3
March 25	Illinois-Chicago	12–8	12–12	3–3
March 29	at Oklahoma State	1–13	12–13	3–4
March 29	at Oklahoma State	2–6	12–14	3–5
March 30	at Oklahoma State	1–0	13–14	4–5

April
Date	Opponent	Score	Overall record	Big 12 record
April 1	at Saint Louis	19–6	14–14	4–5
April 3	Oklahoma	1–2	14–15	4–6
April 4	Oklahoma	4–7	14–16	4–7
April 5	Oklahoma	5–4	15–16	5–7
April 7	Minnesota	3–7	15–17	5–7
April 8	Minnesota	5–3	16–17	5–7
April 10	at Baylor	5–3	17–17	6–7
April 11	at Baylor	7–8	17–18	6–8
April 11	at Baylor	0–19	17–19	6–9
April 14	Indiana State	8–1	18–19	6–9
April 15	Indiana State	12–2	19–19	6–9
April 17	at Kansas State	4–3	20–19	7–9
April 18	at Kansas State	11–6	21–19	8–9
April 19	at Kansas State	5–11	21–20	8–10
April 22	vs. Kansas	3–7	21–21	8–10
April 24	Texas Tech	18–7	22–21	9–10
April 25	Texas Tech	9–5	23–21	10–10
April 26	Texas Tech	15–2	24–21	11–10
April 27	vs. Eastern Illinois	7–4	25–21	11–10

May
Date	Opponent	Score	Overall record	Big 12 record
May 1	at Nebraska	8–4	26–21	12–10
May 2	at Nebraska	6–3	27–21	13–10
May 3	at Nebraska	12–9	28–21	14–10
May 5	Missouri State	5–10	28–22	14–10
May 8	Kansas	8–5	29–22	15–10
May 9	Kansas	4–7	29–23	15–11
May 10	Kansas	13–12	30–23	16–11
May 16	Cal State Bakersfield	4–2	31–23	16–11
May 17	Cal State Bakersfield	8–4	32–23	16–11

Postseason

Big 12 Tournament
Date	Opponent	Site/stadium	Score	Overall record
May 20	vs. Texas A&M	Chickasaw Bricktown Ballpark	5–2	33–23
May 22	vs. Texas Tech	Chickasaw Bricktown Ballpark	2–4	33–24
May 23	vs. Oklahoma	Chickasaw Bricktown Ballpark	5–4	34–24
May 24	vs. Texas	Chickasaw Bricktown Ballpark	7–12	34–25

NCAA tournament: Columbia Regional
Date	Opponent	Site/stadium	Score	Overall record
May 29	vs. Western Kentucky	Swayze Field	5–11	34–26
May 30	vs. Monmouth	Swayze Field	9–0	35–26
March 31	vs. Western Kentucky	Swazye Field	6–11	35–27

=== Tigers in the 2009 MLB draft ===
The following members of the Missouri Tigers baseball program were drafted in the 2009 Major League Baseball draft.

Player	Position	Round	Overall	MLB Team
Kyle Gibson	RHP	1st	22nd	Minnesota Twins
Trevor Coleman	C	9th	263rd	Seattle Mariners
Kyle Mach	3B	27th	807th	San Francisco Giants
Aaron Senne	OF	32nd	972nd	Minnesota Twins
Ryan Lollis	OF	37th	1107th	San Francisco Giants
Greg Folgia	SS	40th	1205th	Cleveland Indians
