= 2006 Big 12 Conference baseball tournament =

American college baseball tournament

- Teams: 8
- Format: Two four-team round-robin groups
- Finals site: AT&T Bricktown Ballpark; Oklahoma City, Oklahoma
- Champions: Kansas (1st title)
- Winning coach: Ritch Price (1st title)
- MVP: Matt Baty (Kansas)
- Attendance: 75,532

2006 Big 12 Conference baseball standings
	Conf.						Overall
Team	W		L		T	PCT	W		L		T	PCT
No. 17 Texas ‍†‍‍^{y}	19	–	7	–	0	.731	41	–	21	–	0	.661
No. 23 Oklahoma State ‍‍‍^{y}	18	–	9	–	0	.667	41	–	20	–	0	.672
No. 10 Oklahoma ‍‍‍^{y}	17	–	10	–	0	.630	45	–	22	–	0	.672
No. 22 Nebraska ‍‍‍^{y}	17	–	10	–	0	.630	42	–	17	–	0	.712
No. 26 Baylor ‍‍‍^{y}	13	–	14	–	0	.481	37	–	26	–	0	.587
Kansas ‍‍‡‍^{y}	13	–	14	–	0	.481	43	–	25	–	0	.632
No. 16 Missouri ‍‍‍^{y}	12	–	15	–	0	.444	35	–	28	–	0	.556
Texas Tech ‍‍‍	9	–	16	–	1	.365	31	–	26	–	1	.543
Kansas State ‍‍‍	8	–	17	–	2	.333	31	–	20	–	2	.604
Texas A&M ‍‍‍	6	–	20	–	1	.241	25	–	30	–	1	.455
† – Conference champion ‡ – Tournament champion y – Invited to the NCAA tournament Rankings from Collegiate Baseball

The 2006 Big 12 Conference baseball tournament was held at AT&T Bricktown Ballpark in Oklahoma City, OK from May 24 through 28. Kansas won their first tournament and earned the Big 12 Conference's automatic bid to the 2006 NCAA Division I baseball tournament. This was the first year that the tournament adopted a round-robin format, with the winners of two 4-team pools facing off in a championship game.

== Regular season standings ==
Place	Seed	Team	Conference					Overall			
Place	Seed	Team	W	L	T	%	GB	W	L	T	%
1	1	Texas	19	7	0	.731	–	41	21	0	.661
2	2	Oklahoma State	18	9	0	.667	1.5	41	20	0	.672
3	3	Oklahoma	17	10	0	.630	2.5	45	22	0	.672
3	4	Nebraska	17	10	0	.630	2.5	42	17	0	.712
5	5	Baylor	13	14	0	.481	6.5	37	26	0	.587
5	6	Kansas	13	14	0	.481	6.5	43	25	0	.632
7	7	Missouri	12	15	0	.444	7.5	35	28	0	.556
8	8	Texas Tech	9	16	1	.365	9.5	31	26	1	.543
9	–	Kansas State	8	17	2	.333	10.5	31	20	2	.604
10	–	Texas A&M	6	20	1	.241	13	25	30	1	.455

- Colorado and Iowa State did not sponsor baseball teams.

== Tournament ==
	Division A	UT	NU	BU	TTU	Overall
1	Texas		5-6	16-8	4-0	2-1
4	Nebraska	6-5		3-2	6-4	3-0
5	Baylor	8-16	2-3		5-3	1-2
8	Texas Tech	0-4	4-6	3-5		0-3

	Division B	OSU	OU	KU	MU	Overall
2	Oklahoma State		6-21	6-11	5-9	0-3
3	Oklahoma	21-6		2-7	0-11	1-2
6	Kansas	11-6	7-2		4-3	3-0
7	Missouri	9-5	11-0	3-4		2-1

Finals
A	Nebraska	7
B	Kansas	9

- Kansas State and Texas A&M did not make the tournament.

== All-Tournament team ==
Position	Player	School
1B	Patrick Smart	Texas Tech
2B	Ryne Price	Kansas
3B	Erik Morrison	Kansas
SS	Beamer Weems	Baylor
C	Jeff Christy	Nebraska
OF	Matt Baty	Kansas
OF	Seth Fortenberry	Baylor
OF	Drew Stubbs	Texas
DH	Hunter Harris	Texas
P	Max Scherzer	Missouri
P	Kenn Kasparek	Texas
P	Brett Jensen	Nebraska
MOP	Matt Baty	Kansas

== See also ==
- College World Series
- NCAA Division I Baseball Championship
- Big 12 Conference baseball tournament
