= Adam Shabala =

American baseball player (born 1978)

- Outfielder
- Born: February 6, 1978 (age 47); Streator, Illinois, U.S.
- Batted: Left Threw: Right

MLB debut
- June 16, 2005, for the San Francisco Giants

Last MLB appearance
- July 20, 2005, for the San Francisco Giants

MLB statistics
- Batting average: .200
- Home runs: 0
- Runs batted in: 4
- Stats at Baseball Reference

Teams
- San Francisco Giants (2005)

Adam Jason Shabala (born February 6, 1978) is a former outfielder in Major League Baseball who played one season for the San Francisco Giants in 2005.

Drafted out of the University of Nebraska–Lincoln by the San Francisco Giants in the 10th round of the 2000 Major League Baseball draft, Shabala played in six games for the Giants in 2005. Shabala became a free agent at the end of the 2006 season and signed with the San Diego Padres on November 6. He was released by the Padres and signed with the Chicago White Sox, finishing the season playing for the Double-A Birmingham Barons.
