= Kansas Jayhawks baseball =

- 2026 Kansas Jayhawks baseball team
- Founded: 1867; 159 years ago (Club); 1880; 146 years ago (Varsity)
- Overall record: 2,080-1,996-18 (.510) (Varsity-only record)
- University: University of Kansas
- Head coach: Dan Fitzgerald (4th season)
- Conference: Big 12
- Location: Lawrence, Kansas
- Home stadium: Hoglund Ballpark (capacity: 2,500)
- Nickname: Jayhawks
- Colors: Crimson and blue

College World Series appearances
- 1993

NCAA regional champions
- 1993, 2026

NCAA tournament appearances
- 1993, 1994, 2006, 2009, 2014, 2025, 2026

Conference tournament champions
- Big 12: 2006, 2026

Conference regular season champions
- Big Eight: 1922, 1923, 1949; Big 12: 2026

The Kansas Jayhawks baseball team represents the University of Kansas and competes in the Big 12 Conference of NCAA Division I. The Kansas Jayhawks are coached by Dan Fitzgerald.

== History ==
While the University of Kansas officially recognized baseball as a varsity sport in 1880, club baseball activities occurred on campus prior to this date and six baseball letters were awarded as early as 1874. Notably, in 1867, a team representing the University of Kansas played games against local clubs such as the Topeka Shawnees and the Lawrence Kaw Valleys at the Kansas State Fair. Baseball clubs representing the university would continue to play games against local area teams until becoming a varsity sport in 1880. With its status as a varsity athletic program in 1880, it is recognized as one of the oldest college baseball programs in the United States.

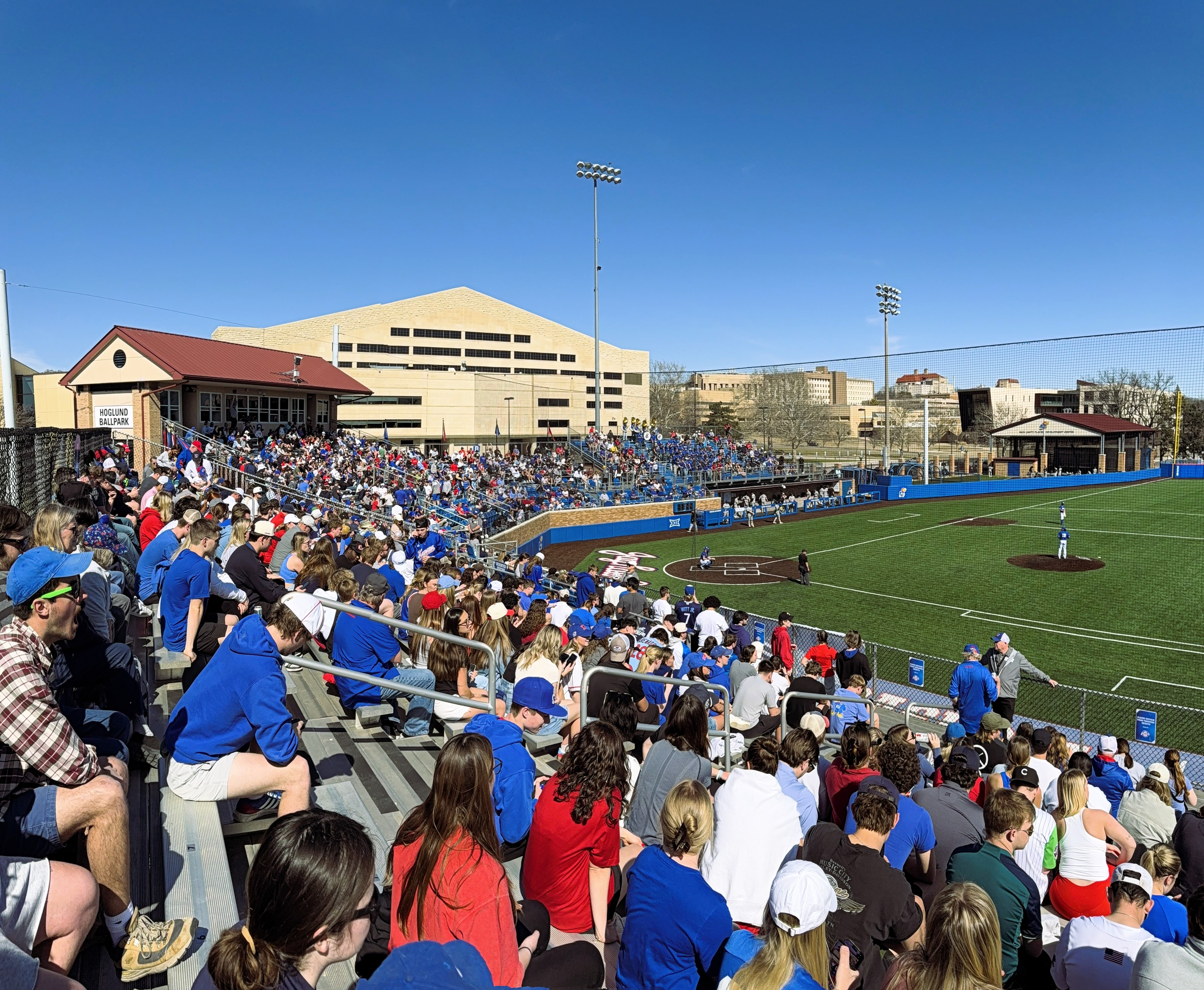
Hoglund Ballpark during the 2025 season

In 1993, the Jayhawks went to the 1993 College World Series in Omaha, NE. This was their first, and so far, only CWS appearance. The Jayhawks were led by All-Americans Jeff Berblinger, Jeff Neimeier and Jimmy Walker into the Mideast Regional in Knoxville, Tenn. After losing their first game to Fresno State, 7–4, the Jayhawks rebounded against host Tennessee for a 3–2 win. Jayhawk Freshman Jamie Splittorff, son of former Kansas City Royal Paul Splittorff, got the win for KU going 8 1/3 innings. KU then trounced Rutgers, 8–2, and Clemson, 9–1, to set up the all-important re-match with Fresno State. Jayhawk coach Dave Bingham turned to Walker, who had been a reliever all season for KU, to start the Regional Final. Walker didn't disappoint as he pitched a complete game and the Jayhawks won in 10 innings, with some late game magic. Down 2–1 in the bottom of the ninth with one out, Berblinger tripled. One out later, Berblinger scored on Josh Igou's infield hit to force extra innings. In the tenth, Brent Wilhelm scored on Darryl Monroe's hot shot to short stop. Once in Omaha the joy was short-lived, as the Jayhawks lost to Texas A&M, and then Long Beach State for an early exit.

The Jayhawks returned to the Regionals in 1994, earning a bid to the Atlantic II Regional in Tallahassee, Fla.

The Jayhawks would once again find themselves in a regional in the 2006 NCAA Division I baseball tournament after winning the 2006 Big 12 Conference baseball tournament. That year KU traveled to Corvallis, Oregon for the Corvallis Regional. KU went 1–2 and did not advance.

The Jayhawks made the 2009 NCAA Division I baseball tournament as a 3 seed in the Chapel Hill Regional and went 2–2. They went 1–1 against 2-seed Coastal Carolina, defeated 4-seed Dartmouth, and were finally knocked out by 1-seed and regional winner North Carolina in the last game of the regional.

In 2014, the Jayhawks made their 5th NCAA tournament appearance, but were eliminated after losing 8-6 against Kentucky and finishing 1–2 in the Louisville Regional.

== Kansas in the NCAA tournament ==
Year	Record	Pct	Notes
1993	4–3	.571	College World Series 7th place, Mideast Regional Champions
1994	1–2	.333	Atlantic II Regional
2006	1–2	.333	Corvallis Regional
2009	2–2	.500	Chapel Hill Regional
2014	1–2	.333	Louisville Regional
2025	0–2	.000	Fayetteville Regional
2026	3–0	1.000	Lawrence Super Regional, Lawrence Regional Champions
TOTALS	12–13	.480	

== First team All-Americans ==
- 1954 – John Trombold, OF (ABCA)
- 1980 – Matt Gundelfinger, DH (ABCA)
- 1993 – Jeff Berblinger, 2B (NCBWA)
- 1996 – Josh Kliner, 2B (ABCA, Baseball America)
- 2006 – Don Czyz, P (NCBWA)

== MLB players ==
=== Current ===
Kansas has 1 active player in the MLB, Ryan Zeferjahn, who currently pitches for the Los Angeles Angels. Rob Thomson, manager of the Philadelphia Phillies, played for Kansas from 1983 to 1985.

=== Former ===
Player	Year(s)	Team(s)	Awards
Bob Allison	1958–70	Washington Senators, Minnesota Twins	1959 AL Rookie of the Year, 3-time All-Star
Ferrell Anderson	1946,1953	Brooklyn Dodgers, St. Louis Cardinals	
Jeff Berblinger	1997	St. Louis Cardinals	
Herb Bradley	1927–1929	Boston Red Sox	
Clay Christiansen	1984	New York Yankees	
Chuck Dobson	1966–71, 73–75	Kansas City / Oakland A's, California Angels	
Bob Edmundson	1906,08	Washington Senators	
Dale Gear	1896–97, 1901	Cleveland Spiders, Washington Senators	
Tom Gorzelanny	2005-2016	Pittsburgh Pirates, Chicago Cubs, Washington Nationals, Milwaukee Brewers, Detroit Tigers, Cleveland Indians	
Harry Huston	1906	Philadelphia Phillies	
Skip James	1977–78	San Francisco Giants	
Steve Jeltz	1983–90	Philadelphia Phillies, Kansas City Royals	
Larry Miller	1964–66	Los Angeles Dodgers, New York Mets	
John Nelson	2006	St. Louis Cardinals	
Ray Pierce	1924–26	Chicago Cubs, Philadelphia Phillies	
Steve Renko	1969–83	Montreal Expos, Chicago Cubs, Chicago White Sox, Oakland A's, Boston Red Sox, California Angels, Kansas City Royals	
Curt Schmidt	1995	Montreal Expos	
Roger Slagle	1979	New York Yankees	
Scott Taylor	1995	Texas Rangers	
Les Walrond	2003, 2006, 2008	Kansas City Royals, Chicago Cubs, Philadelphia Phillies	

== See also ==
- List of NCAA Division I baseball programs
