= Yarmouth–Dennis Red Sox =

Collegiate summer baseball team in Massachusetts

Information
- League: Cape Cod Baseball League (East Division)
- Location: South Yarmouth, Massachusetts
- Ballpark: Merrill "Red" Wilson Field
- League championships: 1958, 1960, 1989, 1990, 2004, 2006, 2007, 2014, 2015, 2016
- Former name: Yarmouth Indians (1946–1967); Yarmouth Red Sox (1968–1976)
- President: Paul Izzo
- General manager: Terry Hisey
- Manager: Scott Pickler
- Website: www.capecodleague.com/yarmouth-dennis/

The Yarmouth–Dennis Red Sox, or Y-D Red Sox, are a collegiate summer baseball team based in South Yarmouth, Massachusetts. The team is a member of the Cape Cod Baseball League (CCBL) and plays in the league's East Division. The Red Sox play their home games at Red Wilson Field on the campus of Dennis-Yarmouth Regional High School.

The Red Sox most recently won the CCBL championship in 2016 when they defeated the Falmouth Commodores two games to one to win the best of three championship series. The title was the team's third consecutive and sixth in a 13-year span. Since the club's inception, over 100 players have gone on to play in Major League Baseball.

== History ==
=== Pre-modern era ===
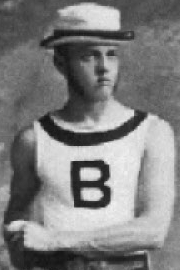
In 1883, Fred Tenney was principal of Yarmouth High School and pitched for the town team. He went on to play for the major league Boston Reds the following season.

==== Early years ====
Baseball in the town of Yarmouth dates back to the early days of the sport on Cape Cod. The Yarmouth Mattakeesetts were organized in 1867 and battled the "Barnstable Cummaquids" on at least three occasions that year. After splitting their first two recorded contests, the seemingly evenly-matched teams met for a highly anticipated third game, this time as an attraction at the Barnstable County Fair. The Cummaquids took the lopsided match, 30–13, and with their victory secured the prize of a "beautiful silver mounted carved black walnut bat costing $15."

In 1877, Yarmouth split a pair of games against the "Sandwich Resolutes". In a July 4 contest the following year, the Resolutes defeated Yarmouth, 14–2, but the teams played a much more closely contested game when they met once more in 1879. The Yarmouth team met up with a team from Barnstable again in 1883 for a July 4 contest that had become an annual event. The 1883 Yarmouth team featured pitcher Fred Tenney, principal of Yarmouth High School, who went on to play in the major leagues with the Washington Nationals and the Boston Reds of the Union Association.

In 1886, the Yarmouth Grays dropped a July 3 contest to the Brewster town club, 11–9, in a game that saw Brewster turn a rare triple play. The Grays fared better that season against teams from Barnstable and Harwich, defeating those clubs by decisive margins of 31–3 and 19–7.

In 1891 and 1892, Harvard University's Frank Hallowell was player/manager for the South Yarmouth team. Hallowell was a two-time gridiron All-American for Harvard, and also played center field for the Crimson nine. While at South Yarmouth, he was praised for his "fine work, and especially his system of coaching."

==== The early Cape League era (1923–1939) ====
In 1923, the Cape Cod Baseball League was formed and initially included four teams: Falmouth, Chatham, Osterville, and Hyannis. This early Cape League operated through the 1939 season and disbanded in 1940, due in large part to the difficulty of securing ongoing funding during the Great Depression. During this period, teams from various towns moved in and out of the league each season. The Yarmouth Athletic Association did not enter a team in the Cape League during this era, but played instead in the Cape Cod Twilight League.

==== The Upper and Lower Cape League era (1946–1962) ====
The Cape League reorganized in 1946 after a hiatus during World War II. The Yarmouth Indians and Dennis Clippers played in the Lower Cape Division. The Indians played at the John Simpkins school in South Yarmouth, while the Clippers' played home games at the Ezra Baker school in South Dennis. The neighboring towns developed a heated rivalry throughout the 1940s and 1950s.

===== Dennis Clippers =====
The Clippers were the first in the Lower Cape league to play home games at night, as lights were installed at Baker Field in 1949, and the field also boasted an electronic scoreboard. The Lower Cape teams held their annual All-Star Game under the Baker lights in 1949, the Dennis diamond being considered one of the finest in the Cape League at the time. Skipper Bren Taylor's Clippers reached the CCBL title series in 1956, defeating Orleans in the semi-final playoffs, but losing out to Sagamore in the finals. The Clippers teams of the late 1950s and early 1960s featured hard-hitting infielder Jim Cross, an ice hockey star from Boston University, and CCBL Hall of Famer Bill Livesey of the University of Maine. The Clippers withdrew from the league and disbanded after the 1961 season.

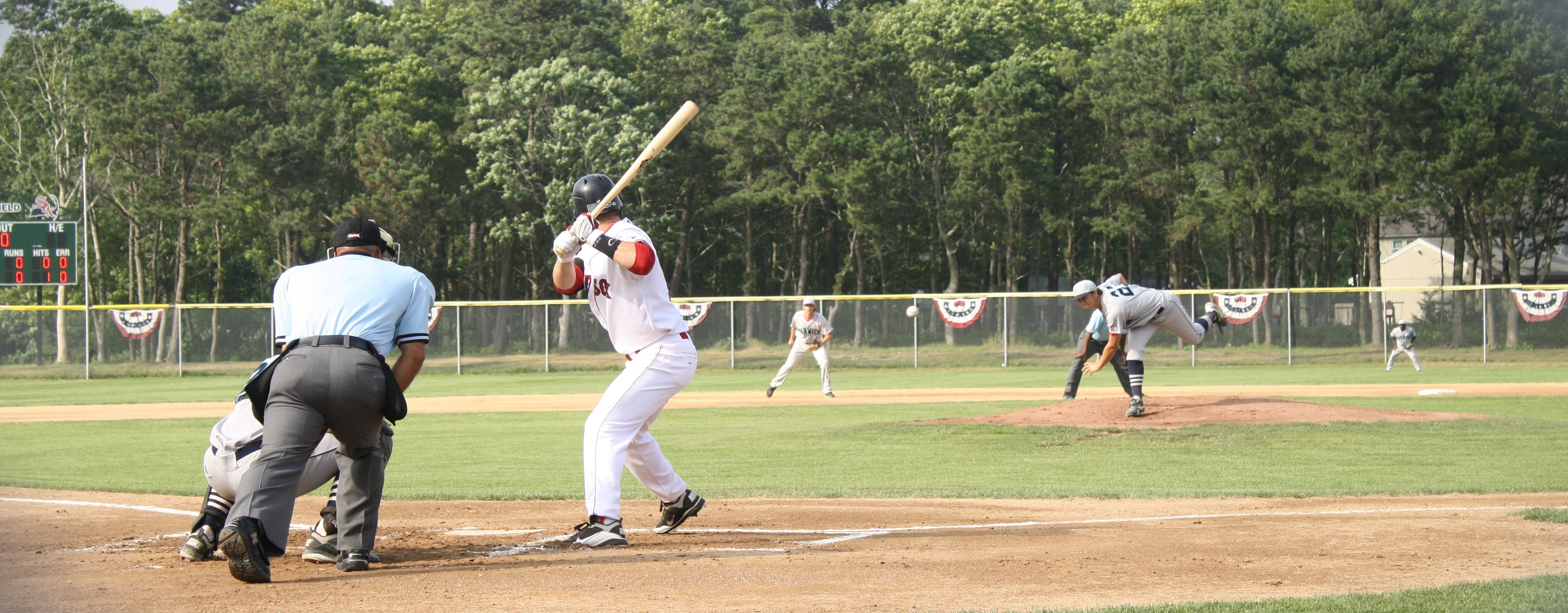
A game at Merrill "Red" Wilson Field, home of the Y-D Red Sox

===== Yarmouth Indians =====
CCBL Hall of Famer Cal Burlingame pitched for the Indians in the early 1950s, tossing no-hitters for Yarmouth in 1953 and 1954. The Indians of the late 1950s and early 1960s were skippered by John Halunen, and starred CCBL Hall of Famer Merrill "Red" Wilson, who joined the club in 1956. He became a seven-time all-star catcher for Yarmouth, and led the Indians to CCBL championships in 1958 and 1960, defeating the powerful Sagamore Clouters for both titles.

The 1958 Indians featured star hurlers Bob Sherman and Jack Silver, as well as CCBL Hall of Famer Jim Hubbard, an outfielder who went on to manage Cotuit to four consecutive Cape League titles in the 1960s. Yarmouth met perennial league powerhouse Orleans in the best-of-three 1958 Lower Cape title series. The teams split the first two games, with the Indians taking Game 1, 3–0, but dropping Game 2, 5–1. In Game 3, Yarmouth broke out the big bats against Orleans hurler and future major leaguer Art Quirk, the Lower Cape's Outstanding Pitcher of the season. The Indians piled up seven runs on Quirk, and Sherman made it stand up for a 7–5 series-clinching victory. The Indians moved on to face a powerful Sagamore team in the Cape League finals. In Game 1, the Indians shut down the Clouters' attack with a three-hit gem by Silver for a 2–1 victory. Sherman took the mound in Game 2, and the Indians came away with the 4–3 win to sweep the series and claim the team's first Cape League crown.

In 1960, Halunen's boys were at it again. After dispatching the Dennis Clippers in the first round of the playoffs, the Indians faced Harwich for the Lower Cape title. The Indians got a three-hit shutout performance by Ron Normand in Game 1 to win, 6–0. Game 2 was a pitcher's duel between Harwich's Dick Mayo and the Indians' Ned LeRoy. LeRoy no-hit Harwich through 6 2/3 innings, and finished strong in the 1–0 series-clinching win for Yarmouth. In the Cape League finals, Yarmouth again met up with Upper Cape champ Sagamore. Yarmouth took a rainy Game 1 by a score of 7–6. Games 2 and 3 were played as a doubleheader. The Indians dropped Game 2 at Sagamore, but came back to win the crown before a home crowd in Yarmouth.

In 1961, Red Wilson was named Lower Cape league MVP, and teammate Dick Cassani was the league's Outstanding Pitcher. The Indians were dominant in the regular season, and met up with Orleans for the Lower Cape finals. Cassani no-hit Orleans to win Game 1, 3–0, but Orleans answered by taking Game 2. Orleans looked to have the decisive Game 3 in hand, up 6–1 in the ninth, but the Indians staged a dramatic rally to take the game and the series. Yarmouth went on to face Cotuit in the Cape League championship series, but was downed two games to one.

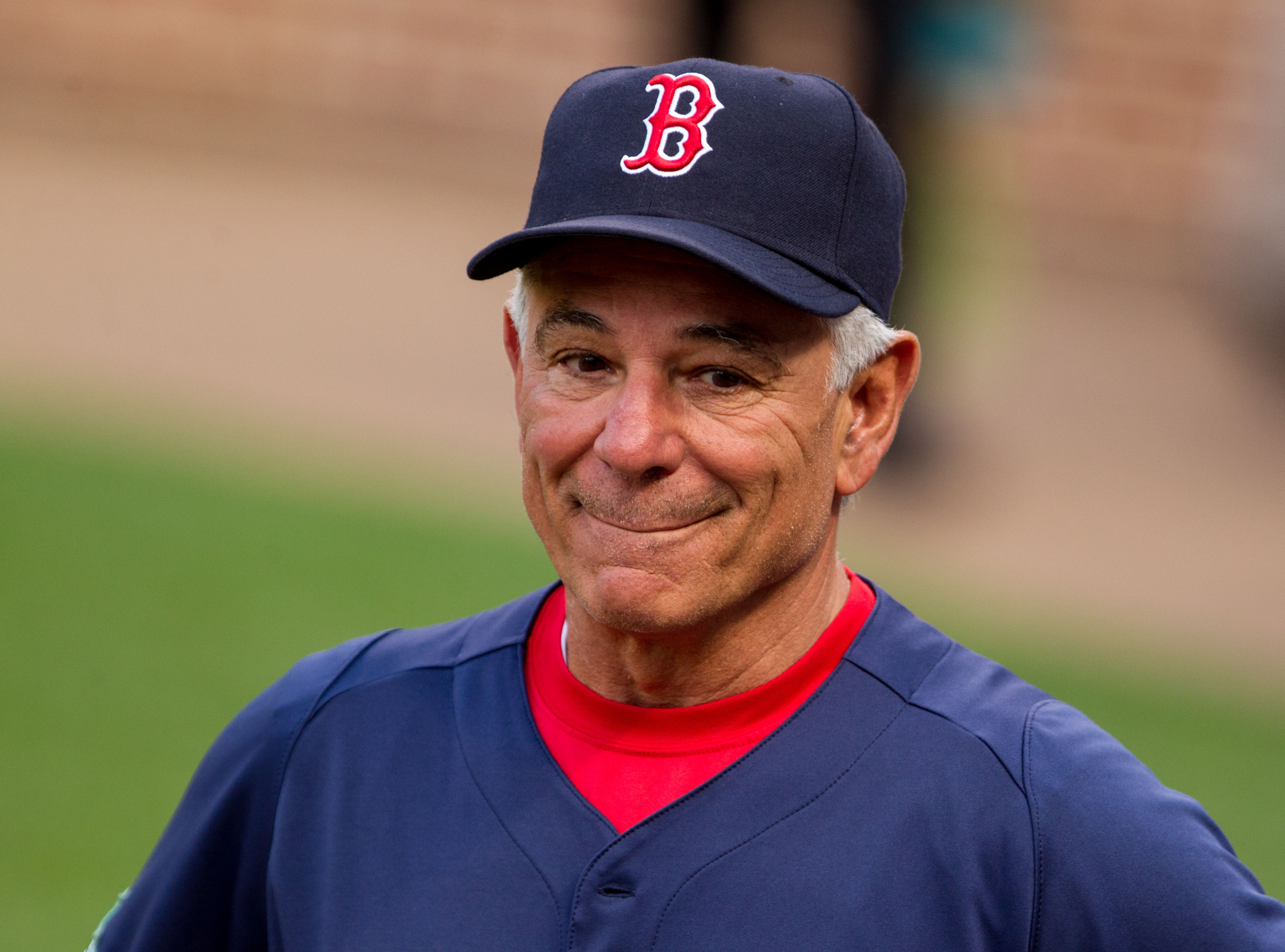
17-year-old high schooler Bobby Valentine batted .294 and led the CCBL in runs scored for Yarmouth in 1967.

=== Modern era (1963–present) ===
In 1963, the CCBL was reorganized and became officially sanctioned by the NCAA. The league would no longer be characterized by "town teams" who fielded mainly Cape Cod residents, but would now be a formal collegiate league. Teams began to recruit college players and coaches from an increasingly wide geographic radius.

The league was originally composed of ten teams, which were divided into Upper Cape and Lower Cape divisions. Yarmouth joined Harwich, Chatham, Orleans and a team from Otis Air Force Base in the Lower Cape Division.

==== The 1960s and 1970s ====
Yarmouth's 1965 team featured Colby College hurler Joe Jabar, who went 7–4 for the Indians on the season. He pitched nine complete games and fanned 74 batters in 14 starts, and was named the Lower Cape Division's starting pitcher at the 1965 CCBL All-Star Game. Jabar went on to pitch two more stellar seasons in the CCBL with Chatham, and was inducted into the CCBL Hall of Fame in 2003. His playing days with the Indians now behind him, Merrill "Red" Wilson became the club's skipper in 1966, and served in that role for 16 of the next 21 years.

In 1967, Yarmouth was managed by CCBL Hall of Famer Lou Lamoriello. A former all-star player in the league, Lamoriello had managed Sagamore to the league title in 1965. He recruited a rising high school senior from Connecticut to play for his 1967 Yarmouth team, and the 17-year-old Bobby Valentine proceeded to bat .294 against the Cape League's elite collegiate pitching that summer, while leading the league in runs scored. Valentine's performance impressed the Los Angeles Dodgers, who made him the 5th overall pick in the following year's MLB draft. Valentine's roommate at Yarmouth was CCBL Hall of Famer Dan DeMichele, himself a three-time CCBL all-star who had played on Lamoriello's championship 1965 Sagamore squad.

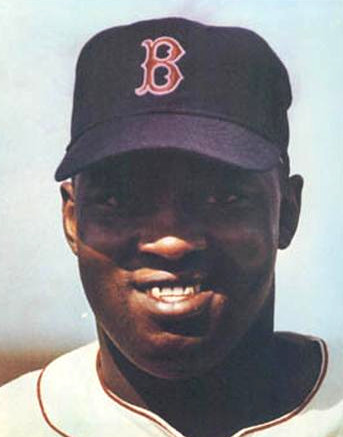
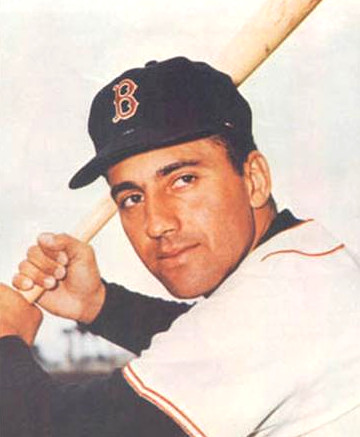
Boston Red Sox stars George "Boomer" Scott and Rico Petrocelli were in town for the 8th annual "Yarmouth Red Sox Day" in 1970.

In 1968, manager Red Wilson returned to his position after a one-year hiatus, and the team became known as the Yarmouth Red Sox. Beginning in the early 1960s, the Yarmouth Chamber of Commerce had annually invited Boston Red Sox players, officials, and their families to take an all-expenses-paid getaway to Yarmouth during the MLB All-Star break, an event that had been billed as "Yarmouth Red Sox Day". The 1968 decision to change the team name "[recognized] the remarkable success of the annual visit to Yarmouth of the Boston team...which has established a special relationship between Yarmouth and the Red Sox," and capitalized on local excitement surrounding the Boston team's 1967 "Impossible Dream" season.

In 1973, the team's home games were moved from Simpkins Field to the Dennis-Yarmouth High School baseball diamond, and Yarmouth proceeded to make its first appearance in the league championship series in the modern era. The team featured future major leaguer Dave Schuler, who was the winning pitcher in the league All-Star Game that year. Despite posting a losing record in the regular season, skipper Red Wilson's Red Sox upset regular-season champion Chatham in the semi-final playoff series. Yarmouth went on to drop the championship series in five games to a Cotuit team that was in the midst of a string of four consecutive league titles.

From 1975 to 1978, the Red Sox were led by CCBL Hall of Fame skipper Bob Stead. In 1977, the team name was expanded to take in the town of Dennis. With the name change, the Red Sox continued to call D-Y High School home, although plans originally called for the team to play a limited number of home dates in Dennis at Ezra Baker School field. In a repeat of 1973, the now Yarmouth–Dennis Red Sox defeated Chatham in the playoff semi-finals but fell to Cotuit in the championship series. Y-D was led by future New York Yankees slugger Steve Balboni. Balboni hit 13 home runs for Y-D in 1977, and clobbered another two over Fenway Park's Green Monster in the annual CCBL All-Star Game. He was named league MVP and Outstanding Pro Prospect, and was inducted into the CCBL Hall of Fame in 2006.

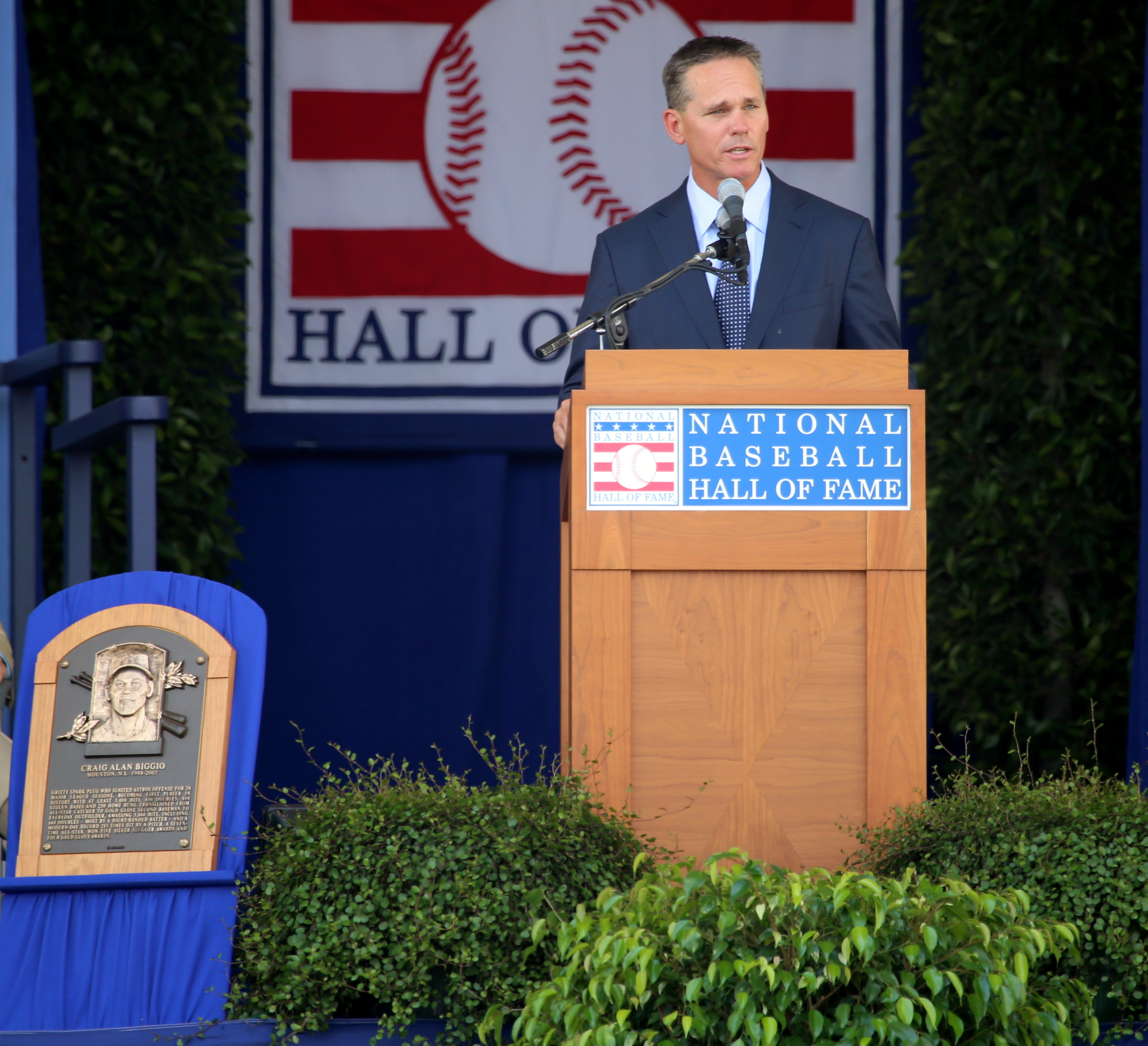
Y-D's Craig Biggio (1986) made it to Cooperstown in 2015.

==== The 1980s and 1990s bring back-to-back championships ====
Red Wilson continued to manage the Red Sox into the early 1980s. A beloved teacher, administrator, coach and athletic director at Dennis-Yarmouth High School, the baseball diamond shared by the school with the Y-D Red Sox was renamed in Wilson's honor in 1981. The 1981 Red Sox featured CCBL Hall of Famer Mark Angelo, who hit .335 and led the league with 14 home runs and 47 RBIs. The Red Sox' 1982 season was highlighted by an 18–3 July 4 win at Falmouth in which Y-D's Joe Olker went 6-for-6 and tied a league record with three home runs in the game. In 1984, an insect infestation at Red Wilson Field forced the "Road Sox" to play the entire season away from the home ballpark. Craig Biggio of the 1986 Y-D Red Sox went on to amass over 3,000 major league hits, and was inducted into the National Baseball Hall of Fame in Cooperstown, New York in 2015.

Y-D returned to the league championship series in 1987, fueled by league MVP and CCBL Hall of Famer Mickey Morandini, who led the league in batting (.376) and established a new CCBL single-season record with 43 stolen bases. Despite losing the title series to Harwich, the 1987 season marked the beginning of a four-year stretch under CCBL Hall of Fame skipper Don Reed in which the Red Sox made the playoffs each season, winning three consecutive East Division regular season titles, and back-to-back league championships. The 1988 team featured future major leaguers Mike Mordecai, Denny Neagle, and CCBL Hall of Famer Eric Wedge, but was bounced from the playoffs in the semi-finals by Orleans.

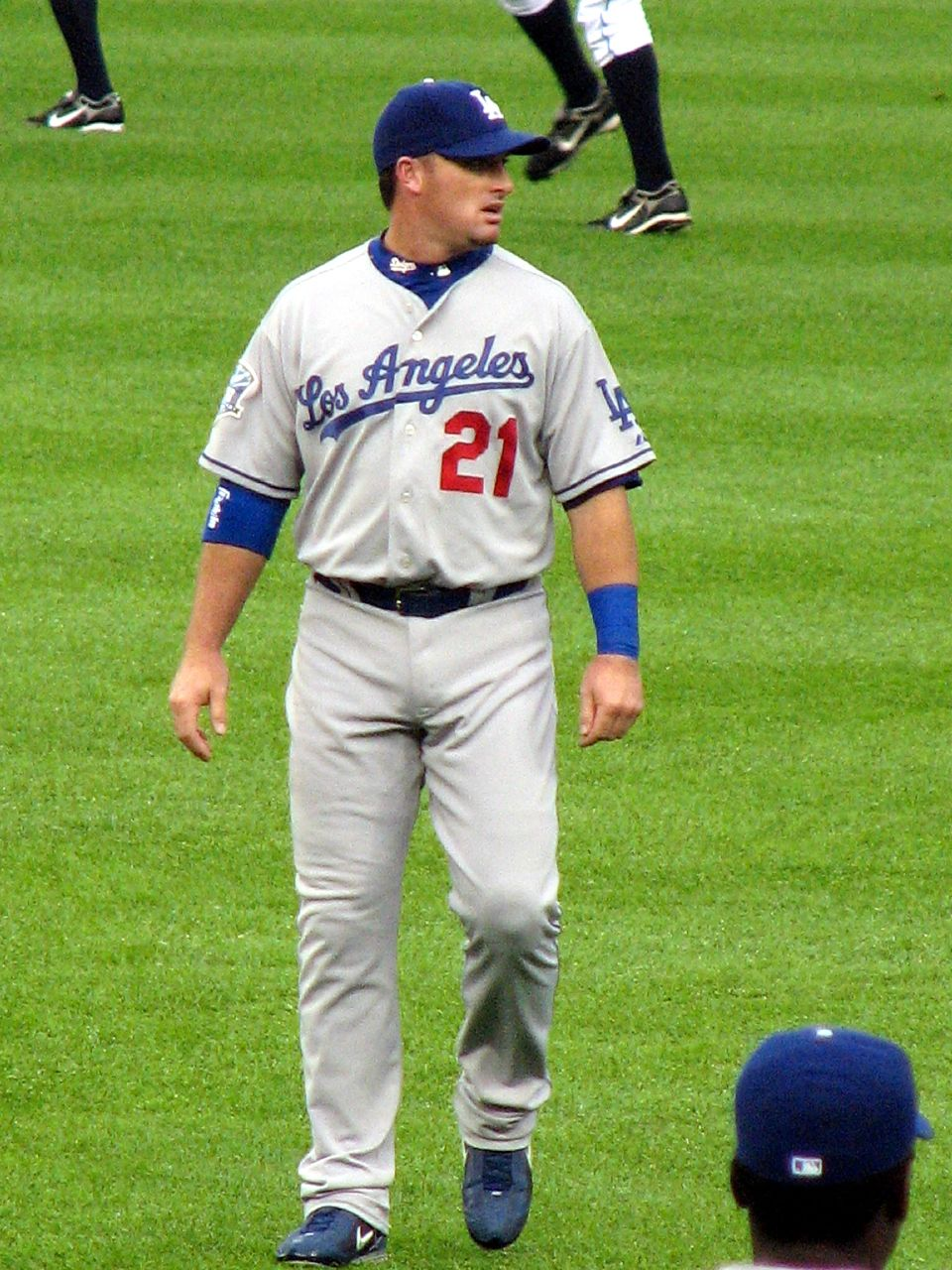
CCBL Hall of Famer Mark Sweeney starred for Y-D's back-to-back champs of 1989 and 1990.

In 1989, the Red Sox broke through with their first league title of the modern era. The team finished the regular season in first place atop the East Division, then faced Brewster in the playoff semi-finals. Y-D took Game 1 from the Whitecaps, 2–1, in 15 innings, and finished the series sweep with a 4–3 victory. In the league championship series, the Red Sox faced the Hyannis Mets. In Game 1 at Red Wilson Field, Red Sox hurler Jim Dougherty tossed a three-hit shutout and the Sox got homers from league MVP Kurt Olson and Holliston, Massachusetts native Mark Sweeney to stomp the Mets, 9–0. Game 2 was played in a steady rain at McKeon Field. Y-D got two triples from Sweeney and came away with a 6–1 triumph to sweep the series and claim the league crown. Sweeney, who hit .500 in 20 postseason at-bats, was named playoff MVP.

Sweeney, the star of the 1989 title club, returned to the Sox for the 1990 campaign. Y-D again finished the regular season atop the East Division, and swept Orleans in the semi-final playoff series. The Sox moved on to face a talented Wareham team in the title series. Y-D got 19 hits in Game 1 at home to outslug the Gatemen, 14–7. Sox catcher Kirk Piskor blasted three long balls in the game, including two in the eight-run third inning. Wareham held serve in Game 2, holding Y-D to just six hits en route to a 6–0 shutout at Clem Spillane Field. Game 3 went down to the wire, with Sweeney knocking a game-winning walk-off RBI in the ninth to give the Sox an 8–7 win and their second consecutive CCBL championship. Playoff MVP honors went to Piskor, and two-time title series hero Sweeney wrapped up a CCBL Hall of Fame career. After the series, it was announced that winning Red Sox skipper Don Reed was not asked to return the following season due to "philosophical differences." Reed went on to manage Wareham throughout the 1990s, where he won another pair of CCBL titles.

After its 1990 title, Y-D suffered a 10-season playoff drought, but the team nevertheless featured several notable players. The 1991 team was led by league MVP Brent Killen, and the 1993 team featured two top pitchers in the league's Outstanding Pro Prospect Chris Clemons and the league's Outstanding Pitcher Andy Taulbee. Jon Petke led the CCBL in batting in 1994 with a .379 mark, and sluggers Todd Greene and Eddy Furniss claimed the All-Star Game Home Run Hitting titles in 1992 and 1996 respectively. Red Sox hurlers tossed a pair of no-hitters in the decade, as Mark Watson stymied Harwich in 1994, and Hank Thoms did the same to Orleans in 1998. Y-D's 1997 team featured league batting champ Jason McConnell (.345), and home run champ Edmund Muth (7), the East Division MVP of the All-Star Game.

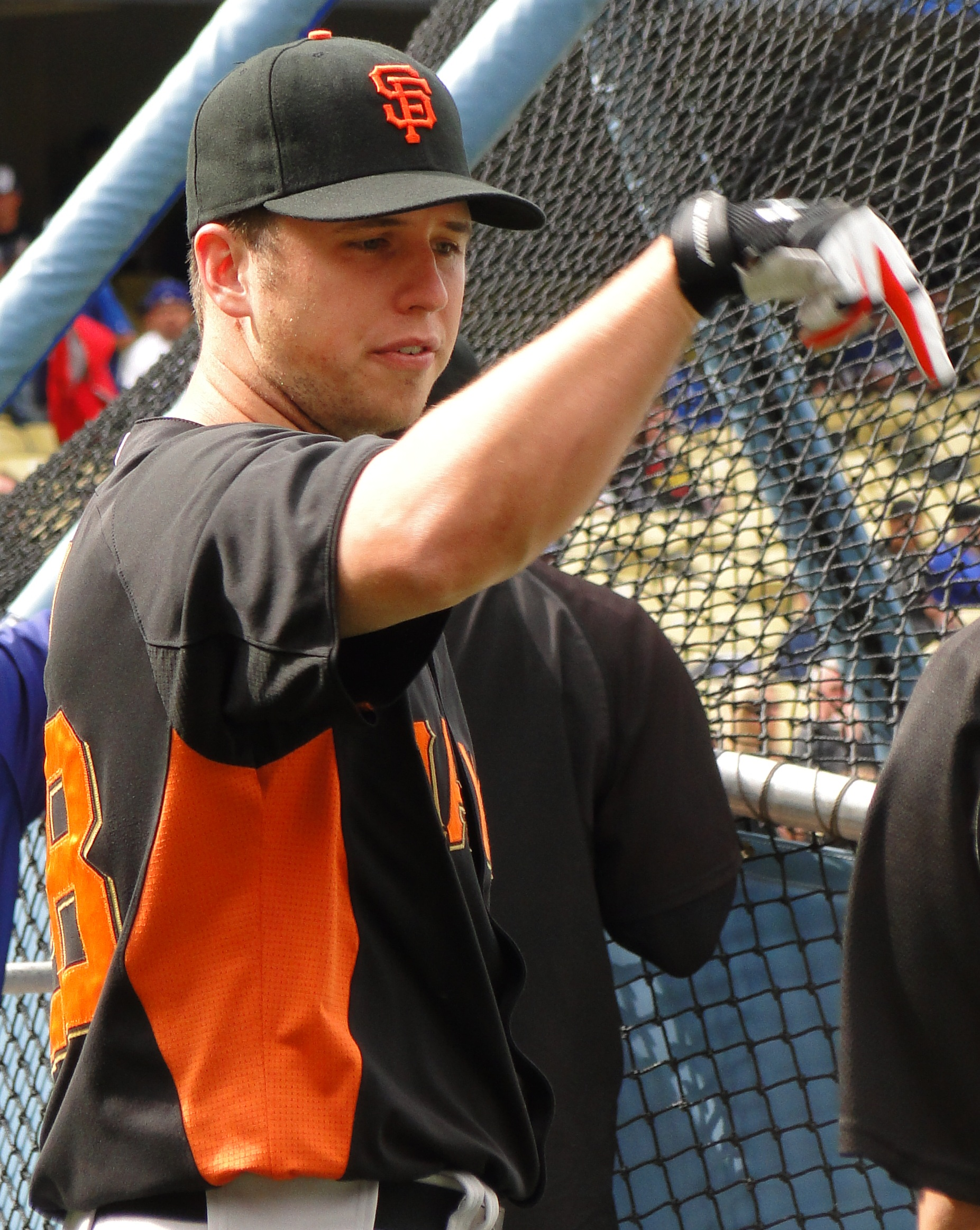
Buster Posey, shortstop/catcher for the 2006 & 2007 back-to-back CCBL champion Red Sox

==== Three titles in four years mark the 2000s ====
Led by manager Scott Pickler, longtime Cypress College coach who had joined the Red Sox in 1998, Y-D finished in first place atop the East Division five times and took three CCBL championship crowns in a span of four years in the 2000s. Red Sox Slugger Jason Cooper was the league's home run derby champ in consecutive seasons in 2000 and 2001. University of Michigan righty Jim Brauer was an all-star for Y-D in 2001 with a 1.84 ERA, then returned in 2002 and tossed a nine-inning complete game no-hitter against Chatham. The Red Sox boasted the league's Outstanding Pro Prospect in 2002, as Wes Whisler, who set a league record with base hits in nine consecutive at bats, took the honors.

Pickler's first title came in 2004, when the team rolled through the playoffs, sweeping Brewster in the semi-finals, and sweeping Falmouth in the finals. The Red Sox took Game 1 of the title series at home, 4–3, on shortstop Ryan Rohlinger's game-winning 8th inning homer. Game 2 of the finals was an all-time classic, with the Sox coming back to tie the game at Guv Fuller Field in the ninth inning on an RBI by CCBL Outstanding New England Player Award winner Frank Curreri. With two outs and the bases loaded in the bottom of the tenth, Y-D outfielder Jim Rapaport made a game-saving diving catch on a sinking liner to right. In the top of the 11th, Y-D opened it up with four runs, including a two-run bomb by Nick Moresi, to secure the 8–4 victory and claim the league crown. Y-D was led by playoff co-MVPs Rohlinger and pitcher Joshua Faiola. Rohlinger hit .429 in the postseason, including a key squeeze bunt in the 11th inning of the Game 2 finale. Faiola earned the save in Game 1 of the finals, then got the win in Game 2, pitching two innings of scoreless relief.

Pickler's 2006 team featured future San Francisco Giants all-star catcher Buster Posey, who was a CCBL all-star at shortstop. The team was particularly strong on the mound, boasting the league's Outstanding Pitcher Terry Doyle and the Outstanding Relief Pitcher Josh Fields. Doyle, a Warwick, Rhode Island native and Boston College product, struck out 52 on the season, including 12 in his July 16 no-hit performance against Chatham. Y-D lost Game 1 of its semi-final playoff series at home against Brewster, but went on the road to claim Game 2 and won the series at home in Game 3. The same sequence repeated in the finals, as Y-D dropped Game 1 at home to Wareham, only to tie the series with a road victory in Game 2, and claim the championship at home in front of a crowd of over 8,000 at Red Wilson Field. In the decisive game, Y-D starter Doyle was perfect through four, going six innings with nine strikeouts and one walk and allowing only one run in the Red Sox' 5–1 victory. Playoff MVP honors went to Red Sox reliever David Robertson, who pitched a perfect three innings with seven strikeouts to close out the Gatemen in the finale.

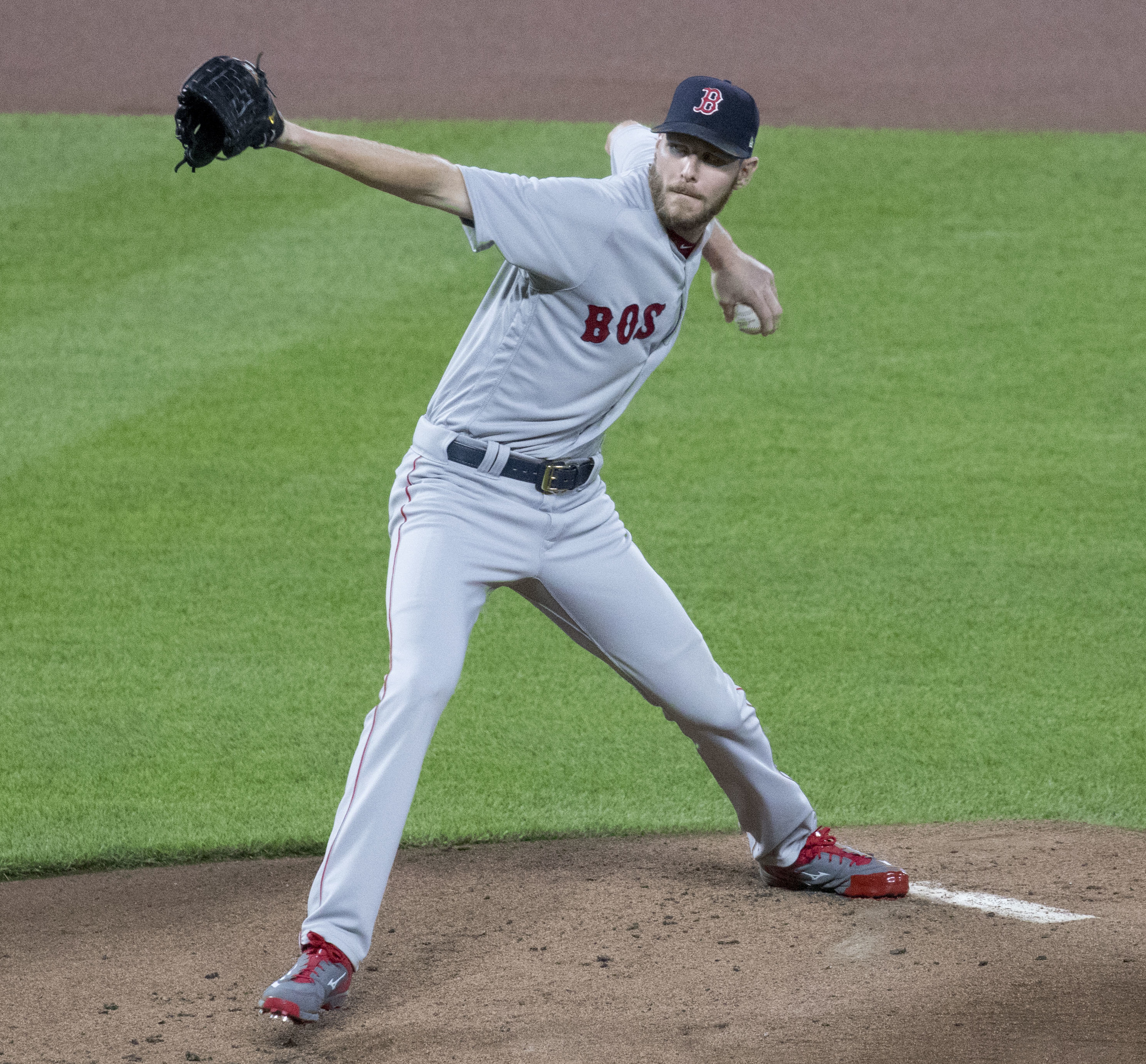
Y-D's Chris Sale won the 2009 CCBL Outstanding Pitcher Award.

Posey returned for the 2007 campaign, and was surrounded by perhaps an even more talented squad. Future major leaguer Gordon Beckham took over at shortstop, while Posey shared time at catcher with future major leaguer Jason Castro. Beckham and Castro were named All-Star Game starters for the East Division in 2007, with Posey making the all-star team as a reserve. Beckham led the league in dingers with nine, and was tied for tops in RBI with 35. The team also featured CCBL Hall of Famer Grant Green, as well as the league's Outstanding Relief Pitcher, Nick Cassavechia, who led the league with 11 saves while recording a 1.07 ERA with 24 strikeouts and only three walks in 25.1 innings of work. The team cruised to the playoffs with a dominating 31–12–1 regular season record. As in 2004, the Red Sox swept the final series against Falmouth, again winning the final game in Falmouth in dramatic fashion by scoring the go-ahead run on a Nick Romero suicide squeeze in the eighth inning scoring Posey. Castro scored another on a passed ball and Y-D's 2–0 lead held up as Y-D took the crown. Playoff MVP honors went to Game 2 starter Trevor Holder who held the Commodores to one hit in eight innings while striking out ten. Holder gave way to Cassavechia who struck out the side in the ninth to claim the title for Y-D. The Red Sox had won their third title in four years, and the 2007 trio of Posey, Beckham and Castro went on to be selected as three of the top ten picks in the 2008 MLB draft.

Pickler's 2009 team again featured the league's top pitchers. The tall southpaw and future Boston Red Sox ace Chris Sale won the CCBL Outstanding Pitcher Award, fanning a league-high 57 batters while walking only nine in 55 innings of work with a 1.47 ERA. CCBL Outstanding Relief Pitcher Tyler Burgoon led the league with 12 saves, striking out 34 in 21.1 innings with a 1.69 ERA.

==== The 2010s and a Y-D "three-peat" ====
After winning three titles in four years with the Red Sox in the 2000s, manager Scott Pickler bested that feat in the 2010s, skippering Y-D to three consecutive league championships from 2014 to 2016, qualifying for postseason play in every year of the decade, and reaching the finals series five times.

Stanford University hurler Jordan Pries provided one of the highlights of the 2010 season when he tossed a no-hitter against Orleans. Y-D boasted the East Division All-Star Game MVP in three consecutive seasons with Caleb Ramsey in 2010, James Ramsey (no relation) in 2011, and Alex Blandino in 2012. The Red Sox also owned the league batting crown in 2011 with Stephen Piscotty's .349 mark. The team reached the league championship series in 2010 and again in 2012, but were shut down by Cotuit and Wareham respectively.

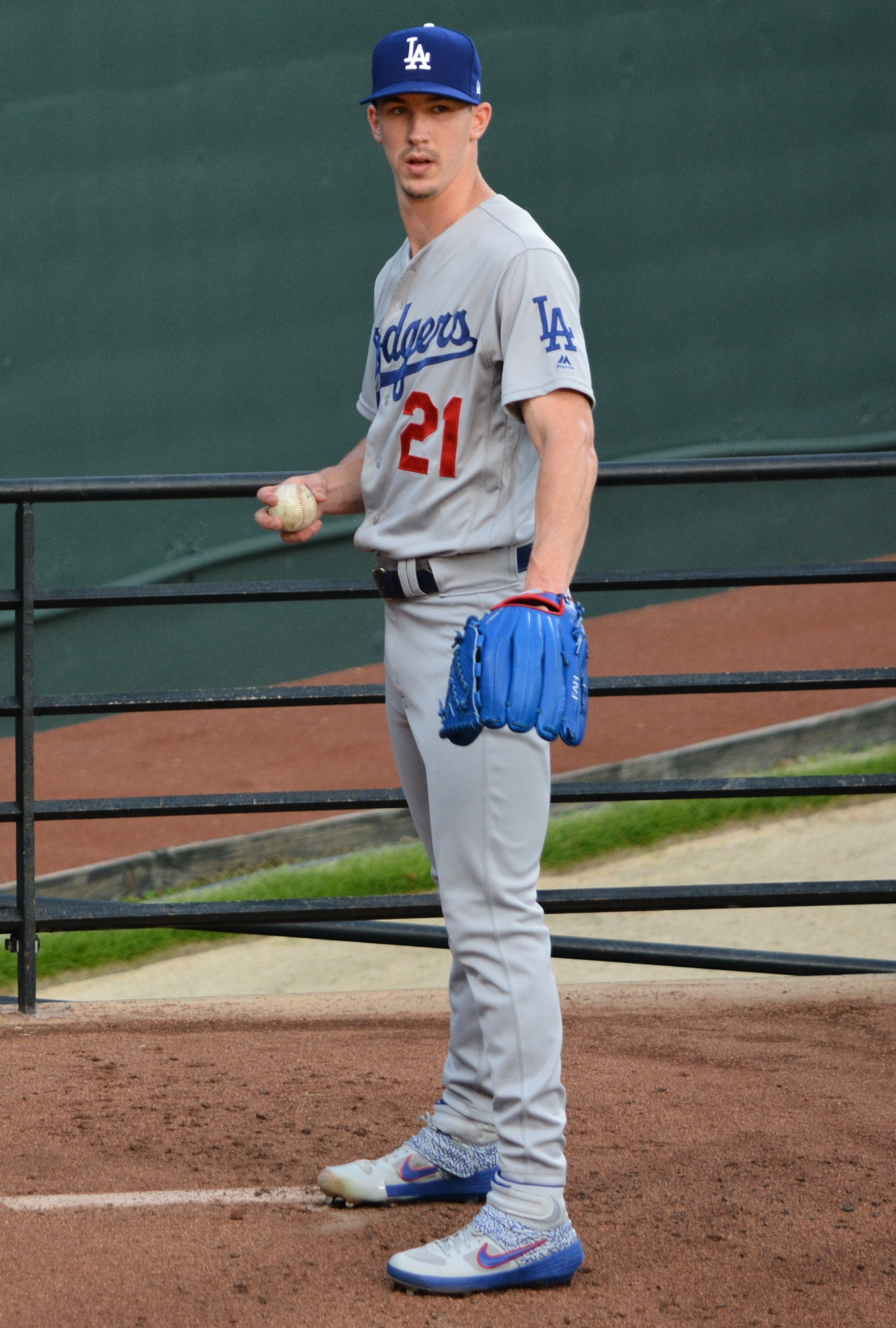
Walker Buehler won a CCBL championship with Y-D in 2014.

The 2014 Red Sox featured future major leaguers Andrew Stevenson and Walker Buehler, and the league's Outstanding Pro Prospect and Outstanding Relief Pitcher, Phil Bickford. The team began the season winning only five of its first 16 games, but came on strong in the second half. In the opening round of the playoffs, Y-D dropped Game 1 to Orleans, but with Buehler on the mound in Game 2, the Red Sox answered back with a 9–0 pasting of the Firebirds to even the series. Y-D pushed across a run on a second inning sacrifice bunt in Game 3, and Kevin Duchene twirled a masterful one-hit gem, allowing only one hit in 7 1/3 innings. The single run stood up as Bickford came in to slam the door and give the Sox a 1–0 victory to claim the series. In the East Division finals against Harwich, center fielder Stevenson provided the power in Game 1, clouting a homer and four RBIs in the Sox' 7–2 road win. The Mariners took Game 2, but Y-D prevailed in the Game 3 pitchers' duel, 2–0, on a combined shutout by Justin Jacome and Bickford, who struck out six in 2 2/3 innings for the save. In the championship series, Y-D faced Falmouth, and sent Buehler to the mound in Game 1. Buehler tossed eight shutout innings, and late-season call-up catcher Marcus Mastrobuoni went 3-for-4 with a homer, three RBIs, and two runs scored as the Sox took the opener, 5–0. Game 2 at Red Wilson Field was back-and-forth early, but the Sox took the lead with a six-run sixth, and handed the game over to Bickford, who tossed the final three innings of shutout ball for the save to close out the title sweep with a 10–4 win. Playoff MVP honors were shared by ace Buehler and the hot-hitting Mastrobuoni, who batted .444 in the playoffs and went 5-for-6 while driving in five of the team's 15 runs in the championship series.

Y-D narrowly squeaked into the playoffs in 2015, not clinching a spot until the final day of the regular season. The club was led by all-stars up the middle with double-play tandem Tommy Edman and Donnie Walton and center fielder Cole Billingsley, and also featured switch-hitting slugger Gio Brusa, and mound ace Ricky Thomas. The Sox swept Brewster in the opening round of playoffs, with Thomas twirling six scoreless innings in the Game 2 clincher. In the East Division finals against Orleans, Y-D dropped Game 1 on the road, but came back to win a dramatic Game 2 at Red Wilson Field. Tied at 1–1 after seven, the Red Sox brought in Ben Bowden for five innings of scoreless relief. With the bases loaded in the bottom of the 13th, Brusa stole home on a wild pitch to give the Sox the 2–1 victory to even the series. Brusa led off the scoring early in Game 3, launching a bomb over the Eldredge Park center field fence, and starter Dustin Hunt struck out 10 and allowed only two Firebird hits in 7 2/3 shutout innings. Walton drove in Brusa for another run in the eighth, and the Red Sox held on for a 2–1 win that propelled them to the title series for the second consecutive season. In the championship round, Y-D faced Hyannis, who crushed the Sox, 8–1, in Game 1 at McKeon Park. Y-D bounced back with a 9–3 victory at home in Game 2 behind the stellar mound work of Thomas, a three-run bomb by Walton, and a two-run shot by Edman. In Game 3, the Sox returned to Hyannis and avenged their 8–1 Game 1 defeat, this time coming out on top of an 8–1 tally. Billingsley's three-run eighth-inning homer sealed the deal, Bowden tossed the final two innings of relief, and Y-D took home its second consecutive league title. Playoff MVP honors for Y-D were shared by Walton and Bowden.

The Red Sox completed the "three-peat" in 2016, led by a sterling playoff performance by University of Maryland infielder Kevin Smith. The club met Orleans in the opening round of the playoffs, and took Game 1 with a 4–2 win marked by a mammoth blast by Smith. The Sox completed the sweep in Game 2 at Eldredge Park, taking a tight 2–1 ballgame on the strength of a second-inning dinger by Cape Cod native Will Toffey, and an eighth-inning RBI by Joey Thomas. The win set up an East Division finals match with Chatham. Smith homered again in Game 1 at Red Wilson Field, and Y-D took the slugfest, 9–8. The Sox completed their second series sweep in Game 2 on the road, getting six effective innings by starter William Montgomery, and prevailing by a 4–1 tally, sending the Sox to a title series match against Falmouth. The Sox fell to Falmouth, 5–4, in the Game 1 opener at Guv Fuller Field. In Game 2 at home, Y-D jumped out to a 3–0 lead in the first on back-to-back homers by Toffey and Deon Stafford, Jr., and got a two-run clout in the fourth by Smith, knotting the series with a 9–4 win. The Sox went up on the Commodores early in Game 3, scoring three runs in the first two innings to take a 3–0 lead. Starter Bryan Sammons tossed six-plus shutout innings of two-hit baseball, and closer Calvin Faucher extinguished a rally in the eighth and slammed the door in the ninth to make the score hold up as the final tally, the win earning the Red Sox their third consecutive league title. Smith was awarded playoff MVP honors, having batted .370 with three homers in the playoffs. His sixth league championship, the 2016 title tied Scott Pickler with Falmouth's Bill Livesey and Orleans' Laurin "Pete" Peterson for CCBL career championships by a manager. Pickler was inducted into the CCBL Hall of Fame in 2019.

Y-D again boasted the league's top pitchers in 2017 with CCBL Outstanding Pitcher Kris Bubic and Outstanding Relief Pitcher Riley McCauley. Former team president, general manager, and longtime volunteer Barbara Ellsworth was inducted into the CCBL Hall of Fame in 2018. The 2019 Red Sox were led by the league's Outstanding Pro Prospect Austin Wells, who batted .308 with seven homers.

==== The 2020s ====
The 2020 CCBL season was cancelled due to the coronavirus pandemic. In 2022, Y-D skipper Scott Pickler recorded his 540th career CCBL victory, passing longtime Chatham coach John Schiffner atop the league's all-time managerial wins list. The Red Sox claimed the East Division's regular season title and won first-round playoff series in three straight seasons from 2022 to 2024, but each time were sent home in the East's finals series. Y-D was led in 2024 by the league's MVP and Outstanding Pro Prospect Ethan Petry and Outstanding Relief Pitcher Trevor Moore, and the Red Sox took home top honors at the annual all-star game as Petry slugged his way to victory in the annual Home Run Derby and Easton Carmichael was named the game's MVP.

== CCBL Hall of Fame inductees ==
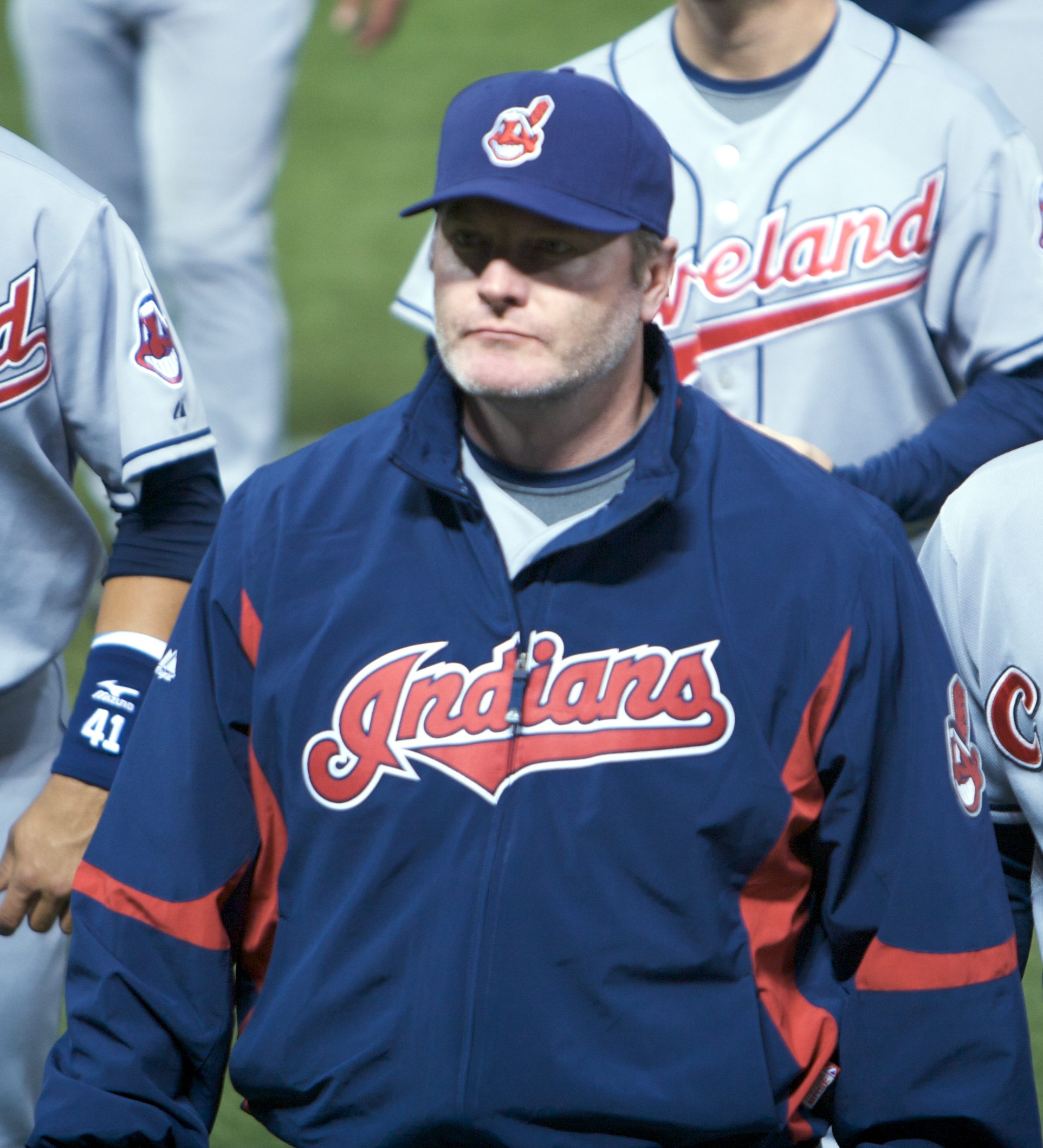
CCBL Hall of Famer Eric Wedge

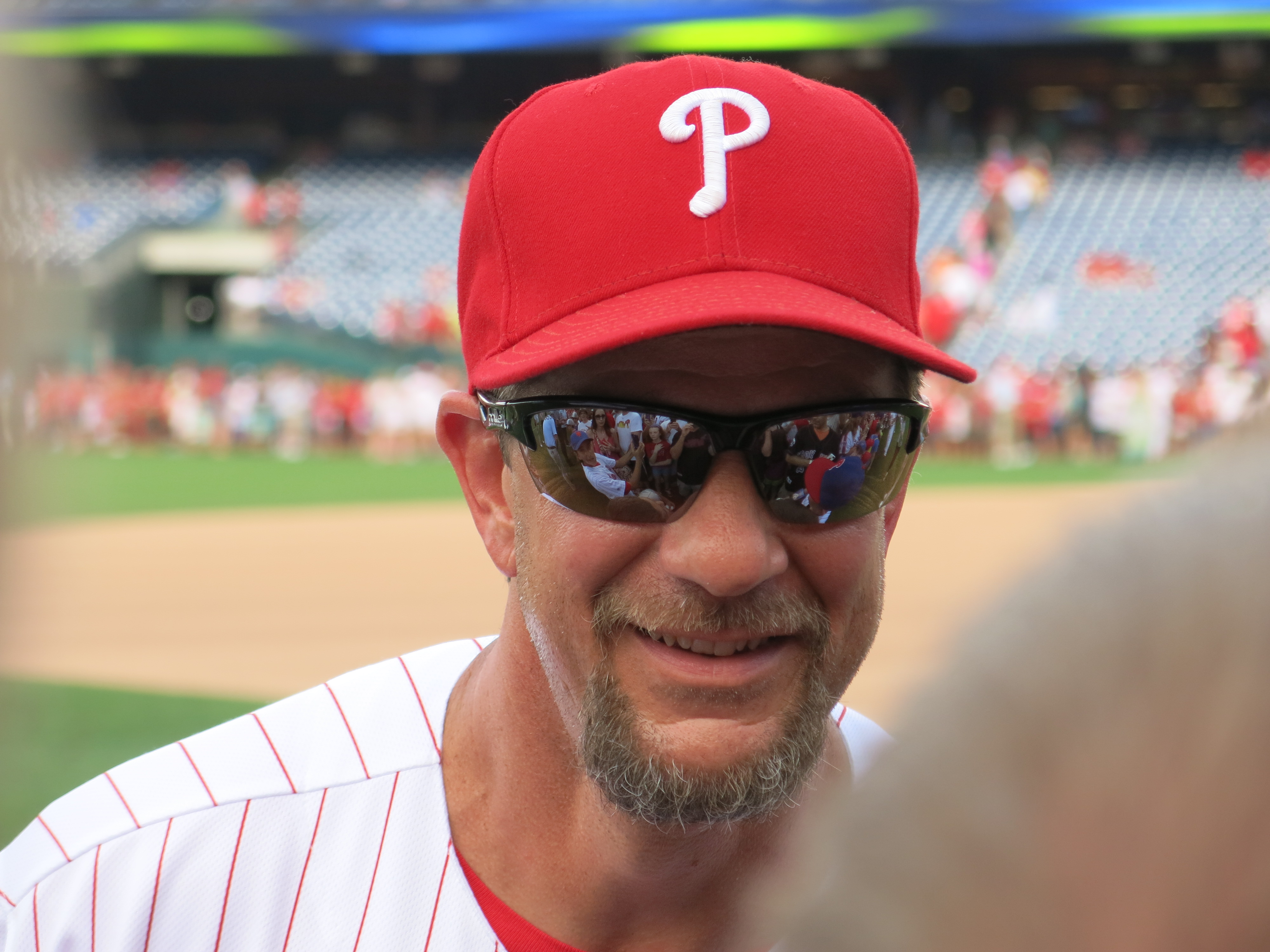
CCBL Hall of Famer and 1987 league MVP Mickey Morandini

The CCBL Hall of Fame and Museum is a history museum and hall of fame honoring past players, coaches, and others who have made outstanding contributions to the CCBL. Below are the inductees who spent all or part of their time in the Cape League with Yarmouth-Dennis.

Year Inducted	Ref.	Name	Position
2000		Merrill "Red" Wilson	Player / Manager
2002		Bill Livesey	Player
2002		Cal Burlingame	Player
2003		Joe Jabar	Player
2004		Don Reed	Manager
2005		Mickey Morandini	Player
2006		Jim Hubbard	Player
2006		Steve Balboni	Player
2009		Mark Angelo	Player
2009		Lou Lamoriello	Manager
2011		Eric Wedge	Player
2012		Dan DeMichele	Player
2018		Barbara Ellsworth	Executive
2018		Mark Sweeney	Player
2019		Scott Pickler	Manager
2025		Bob Stead	Manager
2026		Grant Green	Player

== Notable alumni ==
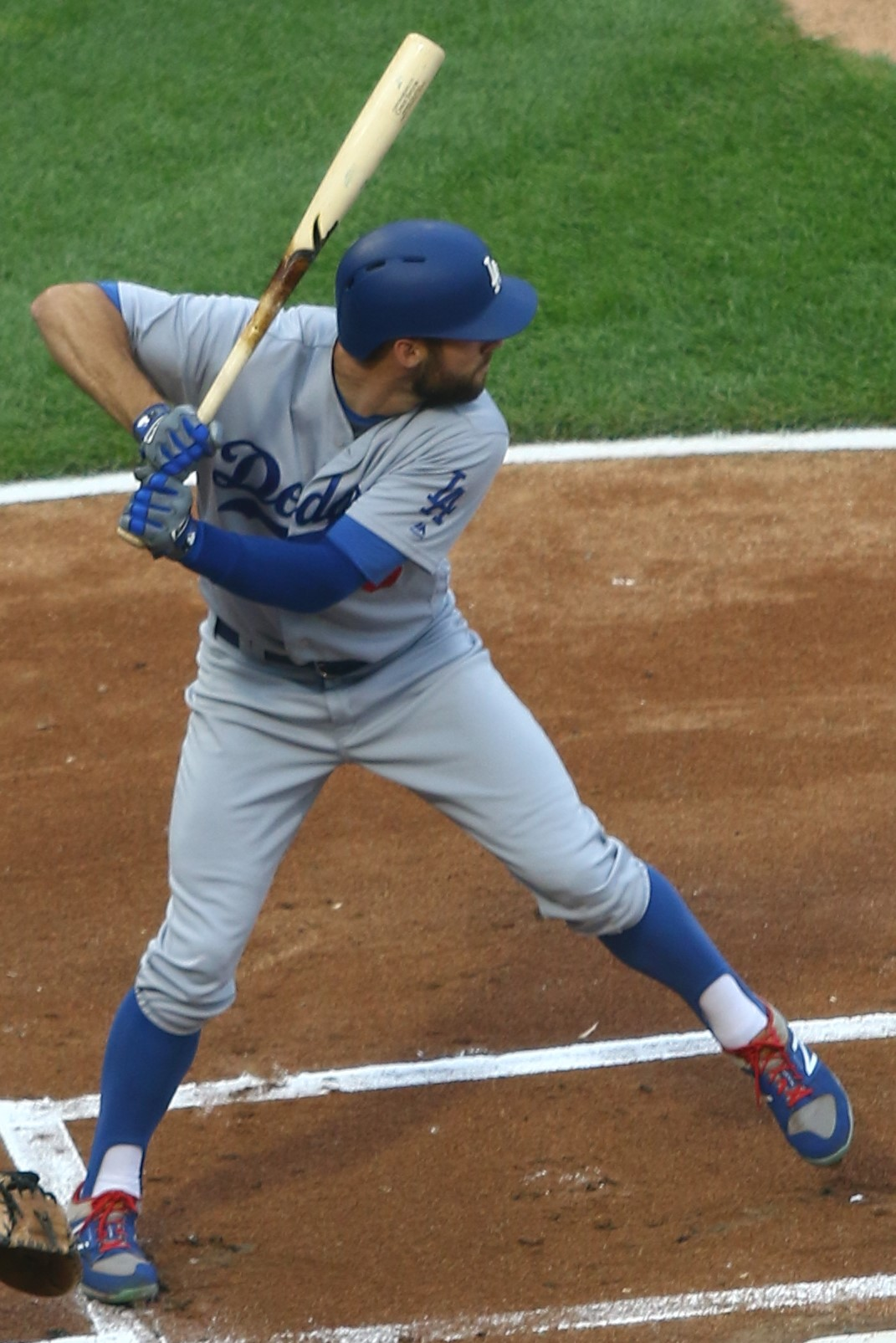
Chris Taylor

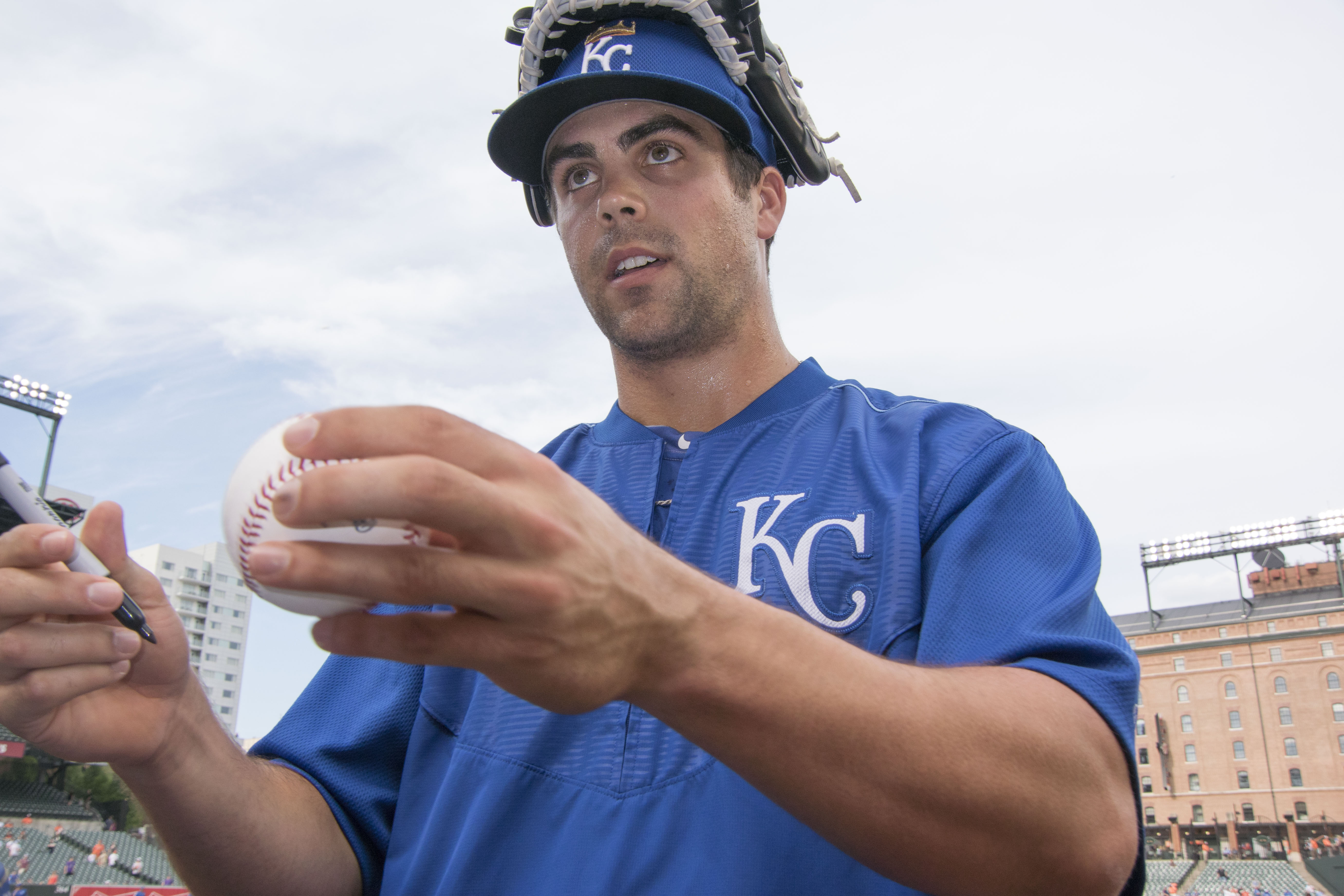
Whit Merrifield

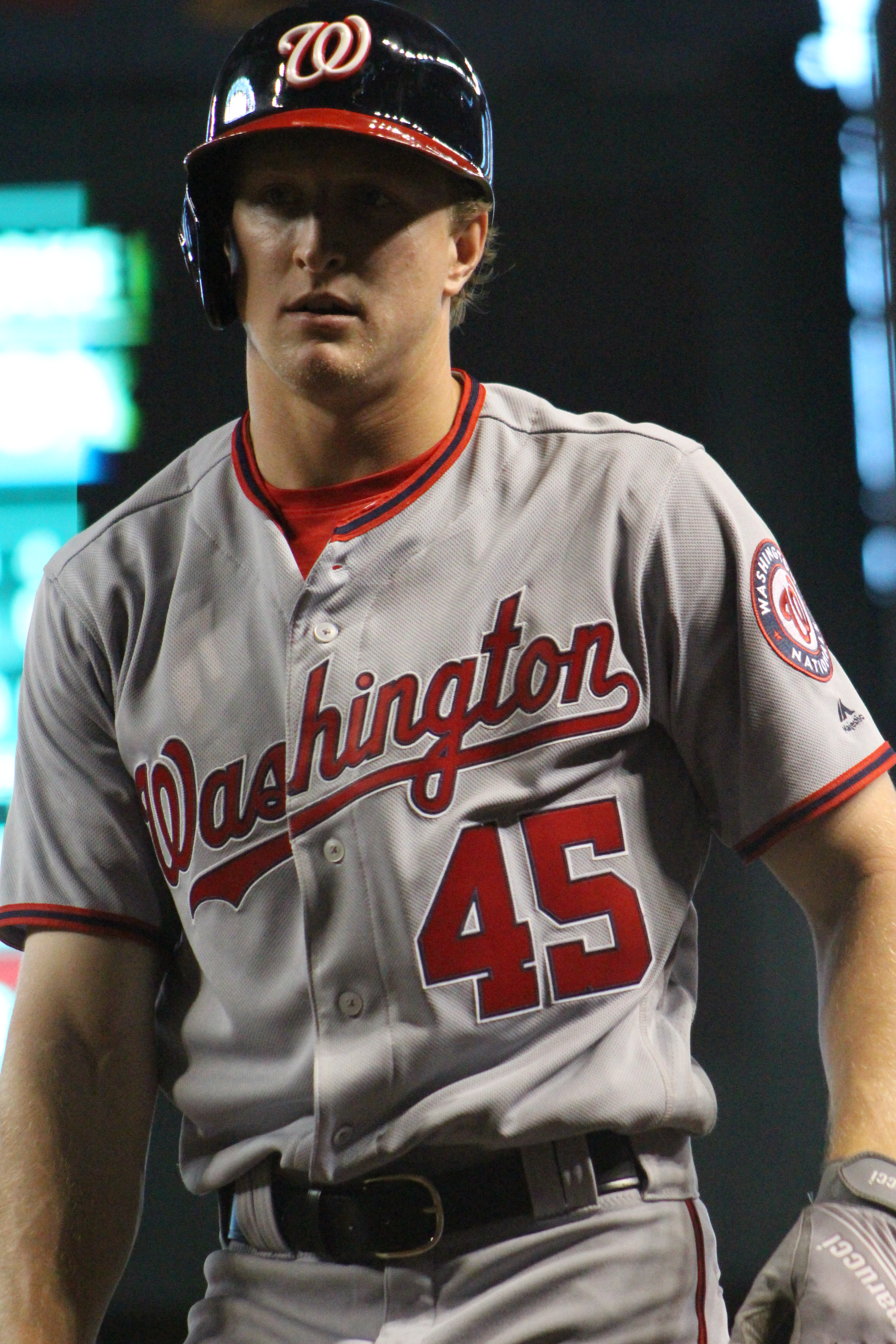
Andrew Stevenson

- Wehiwa Aloy 2024
- Dan Altavilla 2013
- Chris Anderson 2012
- Mark Appel 2011
- Carlos Asuaje 2012
- Ross Atkins 1993
- Brandon Bailey 2015
- Patrick Bailey 2018
- John Baker 2000–2001
- Steve Balboni 1977
- Jett Bandy 2010
- Ricky Barrett 2000
- Mike Baumann 2016
- Gordon Beckham 2007
- Mike Belfiore 2008
- Alan Benes 1991
- Phil Bickford 2014
- Shane Bieber 2015
- Craig Biggio 1986
- Aaron Blair 2012
- Alex Blandino 2012–2013
- Mike Boeve 2022
- Bryan Bonnell 2014
- Mike Bordick 1986
- Michael Bourn 2002
- Ben Bowden 2015
- Tony Brizzolara 1975
- Kris Bubic 2017
- Walker Buehler 2014
- Parker Bugg 2014
- Drew Burress 2024
- Dan Butler 2009
- Josh Butler 2004
- Matt Carasiti 2011
- Jesse Carlson 2001
- Cole Carrigg 2022
- Chris Carter 2002–2003
- Jason Castro 2007
- Chris Clemons 1993
- Steve Connelly 1994
- Sam Coonrod 2013
- Carlos Cortes 2017
- Collin Cowgill 2007
- Gabe Cramer 2015
- Evan Crawford 2006
- Jim Cross 1956–1958
- Trevor Crowe 2003
- Carl Dale 1993
- Sam Delaplane 2016
- Jonny DeLuca 2018
- Dan DeMichele 1967–1968
- Joey DeNato 2011–2012
- Anthony DeSclafani 2010
- Jim Dougherty 1988–1989
- Scott Downs 1996
- Terry Doyle 2006–2007
- Geoff Duncan 1995
- Jeff Duncan 1999
- Mike Durant 1989–1990
- Tommy Edman 2015
- Brad Emaus 2006
- Morgan Ensberg 1997
- Calvin Faucher 2016
- Erick Fedde 2013
- Josh Fields 2006
- Eric Filia 2013
- Randy Fontanez 2010
- Chad Fonville 1991
- Jake Fox 2002
- Eddy Furniss 1996
- Chi Chi Gonzalez 2012
- Paul Gonzalez 1989
- Peyton Graham 2021
- Chad Green 1995
- Grant Green 2007
- Todd Greene 1992
- Matt Guerrier 1997
- Taylor Gushue 2013
- Chris Hacopian 2025
- Joe Hall 1987
- Frank Hallowell 1891–1892
- David Hamilton 2018
- Mitch Hannahs 1988
- Brett Harker 2004
- Hogan Harris 2017
- Will Harris 2004
- Steve Hathaway 2011
- Shawn Haviland 2007
- Brad Hawpe 1999
- Drew Hayes 2009
- Blair Henley 2018
- Tommy Henry 2017–2018
- Wes Hodges 2004
- Nico Hoerner 2017
- Mario Hollands 2009
- John Hudgins 2002
- Luke Hudson 1996
- Philip Humber 2003
- Nick Hundley 2003
- Brant Hurter 2018
- Kyle Isbel 2017
- Joseph Jabar 1965
- Link Jarrett 1993
- Tyler Jay 2014
- Brian Johnson 2011
- Joe Johnson 1980–1981
- Rob Johnson 2003
- Jonathan Jones 2009
- Mitch Jones 1999
- Connor Kaiser 2017
- James Kaprielian 2013
- Alex Katz 2013
- Karl Kauffmann 2017–2018
- Dominic Keegan 2021
- Joe Kelly 2008
- Jackson Kent 2023
- Bobby Korecky 2002
- Christian Koss 2017–2018
- Jake Lamb 2011
- Matt LaPorta 2004
- Mike LaValliere 1981
- Brooks Lee 2021
- Justin Lehr 1997
- Josh Lester 2014
- Ben Lively 2012
- Bill Livesey 1959–1960
- Brennon Lund 2014
- Tommy Mace 2018
- Tony Mansolino 2003
- Alec Marsh 2018
- Michael Matuella 2013
- John Mayberry, Jr. 2003
- Kirk McCaskill 1980
- Daniel McCutchen 2004–2005
- Cody McKay 1994
- Alex McKenna 2017
- Chase Meidroth 2022
- Jon Meloan 2003
- Drew Mendoza 2017
- Whit Merrifield 2008
- Jared Mitchell 2008
- Garrett Mock 2002–2003
- Shane Monahan 1993
- Braden Montgomery 2022–2023
- Mickey Morandini 1987
- Mike Mordecai 1988
- Brandon Morrow 2004–2005
- Danny Muno 2010
- Jeff Musselman 1984
- Denny Neagle 1988
- Ryne Nelson 2018
- David Newhan 1993–1994
- Ryan Noda 2015
- Russ Ortiz 1994
- Larry Owens 1988
- Jordan Pacheco 2006
- Joe Panik 2010
- Michael Papierski 2015
- Steve Parris 1988
- Greg Peavey 2008–2009
- Chris Petersen 1991
- Ethan Petry 2024
- Marc Pisciotta 1990
- Stephen Piscotty 2011
- Buster Posey 2006–2007
- Cody Poteet 2014
- Ritchie Price 2005
- J. J. Putz 1997
- Nick Quintana 2017–2018
- Mike Raczka 1982–1983
- James Ramsey 2011
- Anthony Ranaudo 2008
- Fred Rath Jr. 1992
- Britt Reames 1994
- Mark Reynolds 2002
- Matt Reynolds 2011
- Alfonso Rivas 2017
- Bert Roberge 1975
- David Robertson 2006
- Ryan Rohlinger 2004
- John Rooney 2017
- Scott Ruffcorn 1989
- Josh Rutledge 2008–2009
- Chris Sale 2009
- Bryan Sammons 2016
- Tony Sanchez 2008
- Dave Schuler 1972–1973
- J. J. Schwarz 2016
- Connor Seabold 2016
- Steve Selsky 2009
- Ian Seymour 2019
- Justin Shafer 2012–2013
- Mike Shawaryn 2015
- Glenn Sherlock 1981–1982
- A. J. Simcox 2014
- Seth Simmons 2009
- Jordan Smith 2011
- Kevin Smith 2016
- Steve Smyth 1998
- Collin Snider 2016
- Scott Snodgress 2010
- Tom Songin 1974
- Josh Staumont 2014
- Andrew Stevenson 2014
- D. J. Stewart 2013
- Michael Stutes 2005
- Cory Sullivan 2000
- Mark Sweeney 1989–1990
- Beau Taylor 2010
- Chris Taylor 2011
- Michael Taylor 2006
- Fred Tenney 1883
- Curtis Thigpen 2003
- Larry Thomas 1990
- Stan Thomas 1968–1970
- Drew Thorpe 2021
- Andrew Thurman 2011–2012
- Will Toffey 2015–2016
- Shawn Tolleson 2008
- Sam Travis 2012
- Jose Trevino 2013
- Chris Turner 1989–1990
- Justin Turner 2005
- Erich Uelmen 2016
- Bobby Valentine 1967
- Jamie Vermilyea 2002
- Mitch Voit 2023
- Donnie Walton 2014–2015
- Mark Watson 1994
- Gary Wayne 1983
- Justin Wayne 1998
- Eric Wedge 1988
- Zack Weiss 2011
- Austin Wells 2019
- Chris Welsh 1976
- Matt Whatley 2016
- Wes Whisler 2002–2003
- Nathan Wiles 2018
- Andy Wilkins 2008
- Jackson Williams 2005
- Darrin Winston 1987
- Matt Wise 1995
- Connor Wong 2015
- Blake Wood 2005
- Dan Wright 1998
- Jason Young 1998
- Pete Young 1987
- Daniel Zamora 2015
- Mike Zunino 2011

== Yearly results ==
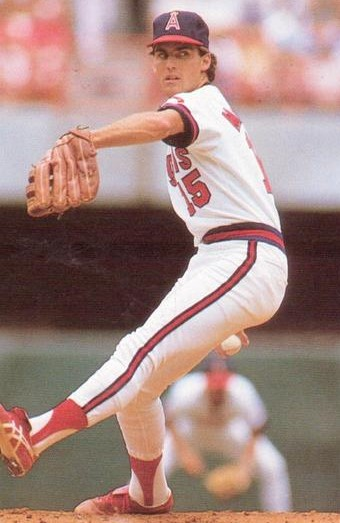
Kirk McCaskill pitched for Yarmouth-Dennis in 1980.

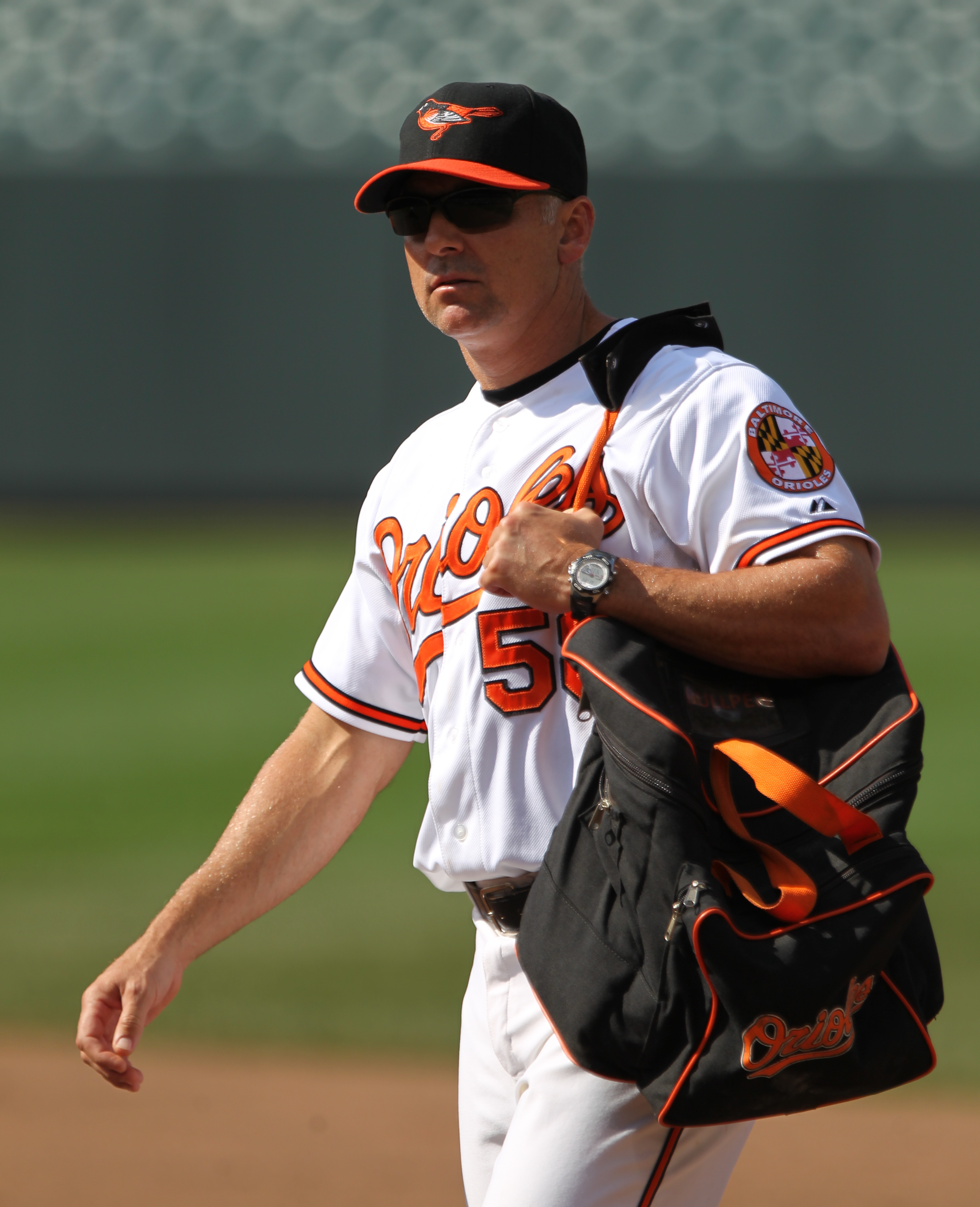
Mike Bordick played for Y-D in 1986

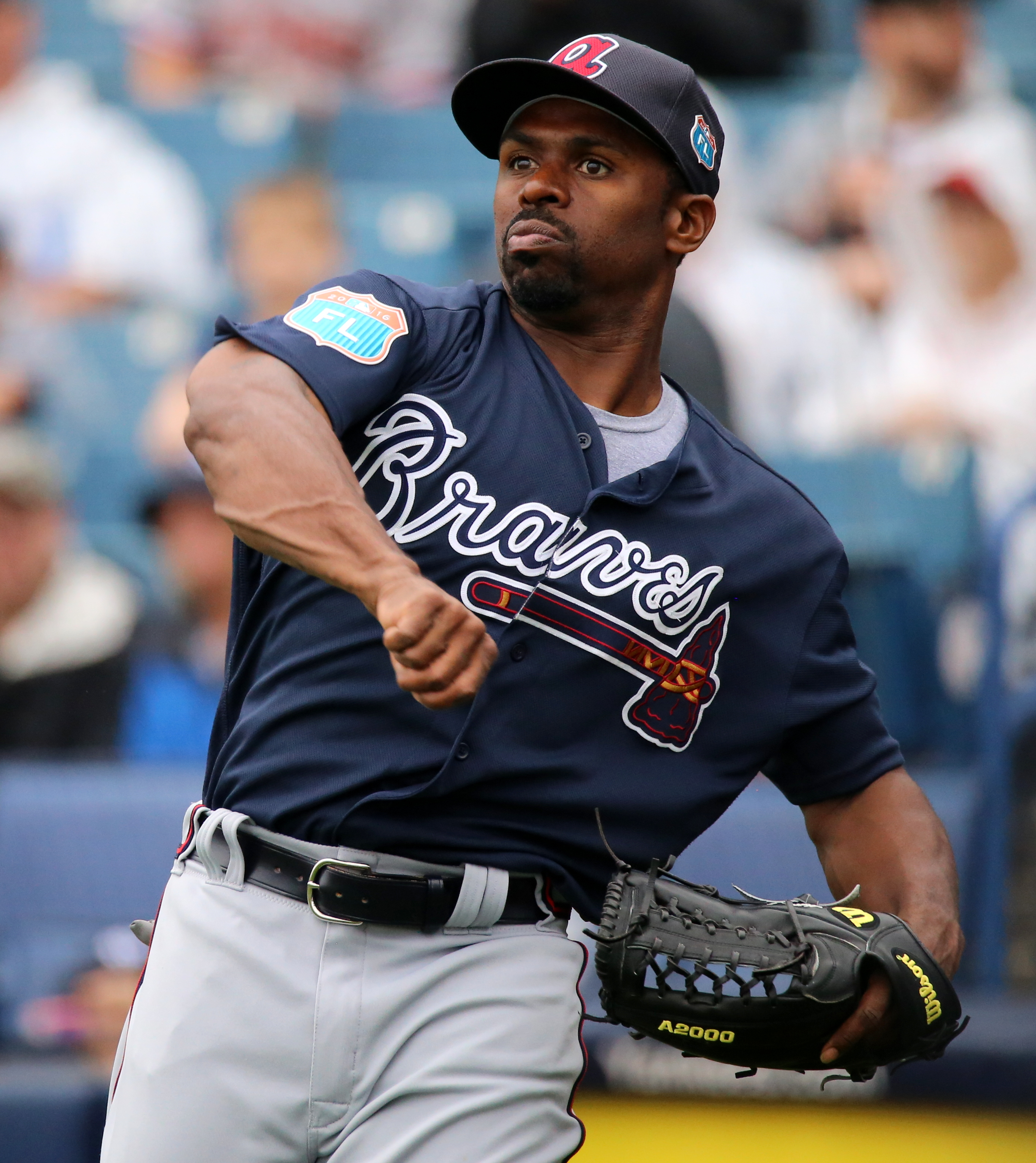
Michael Bourn, 2002 Y-D Red Sox

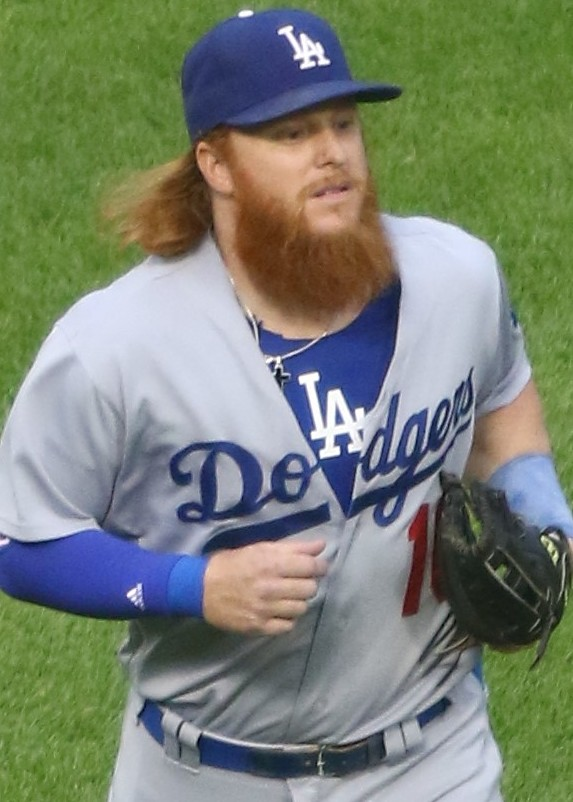
Justin Turner, Y-D 2005

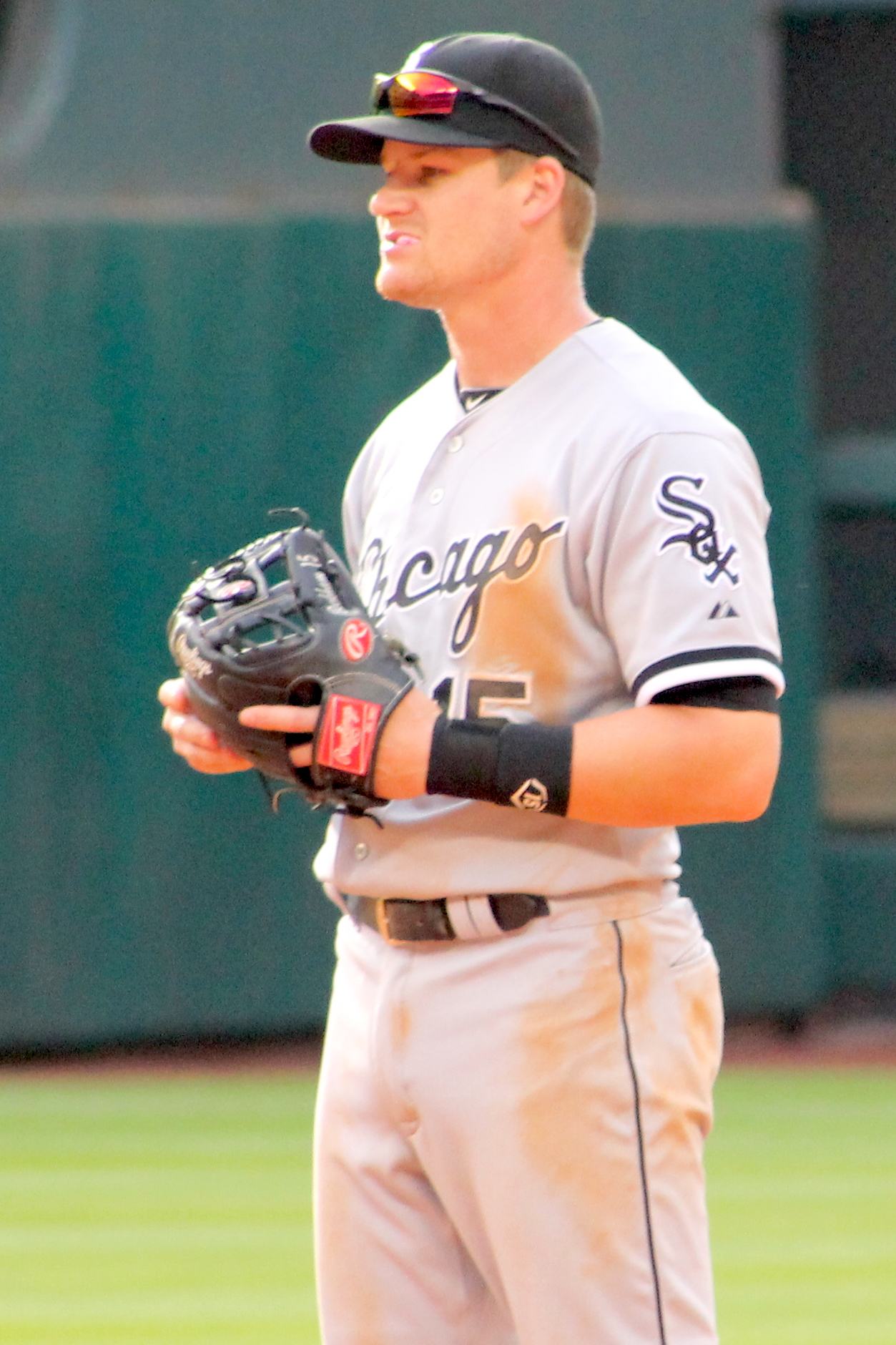
Gordon Beckham played on Y-D's 2007 CCBL championship team

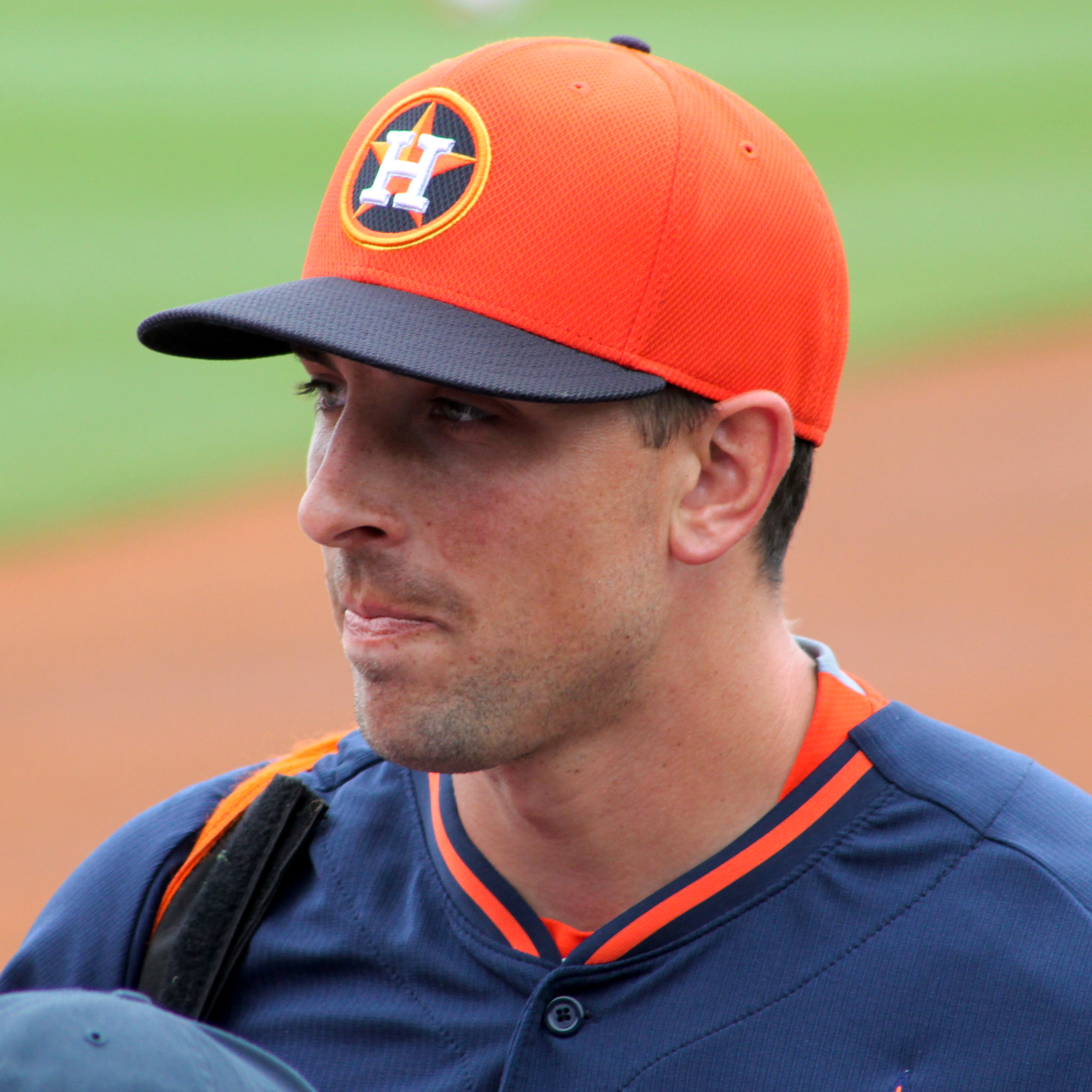
Jason Castro was a CCBL all-star catcher for Y-D in 2007

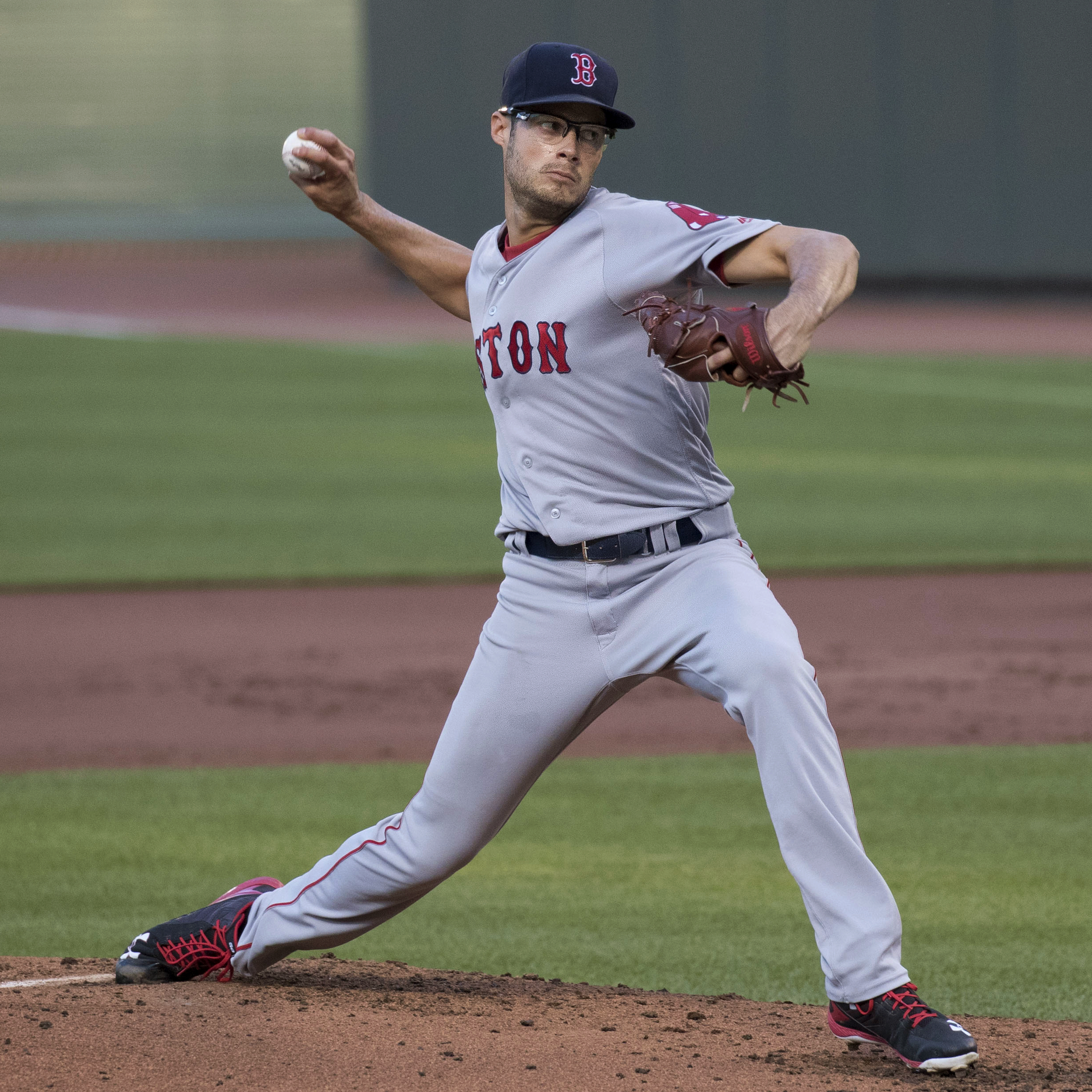
2008 Y-D hurler Joe Kelly

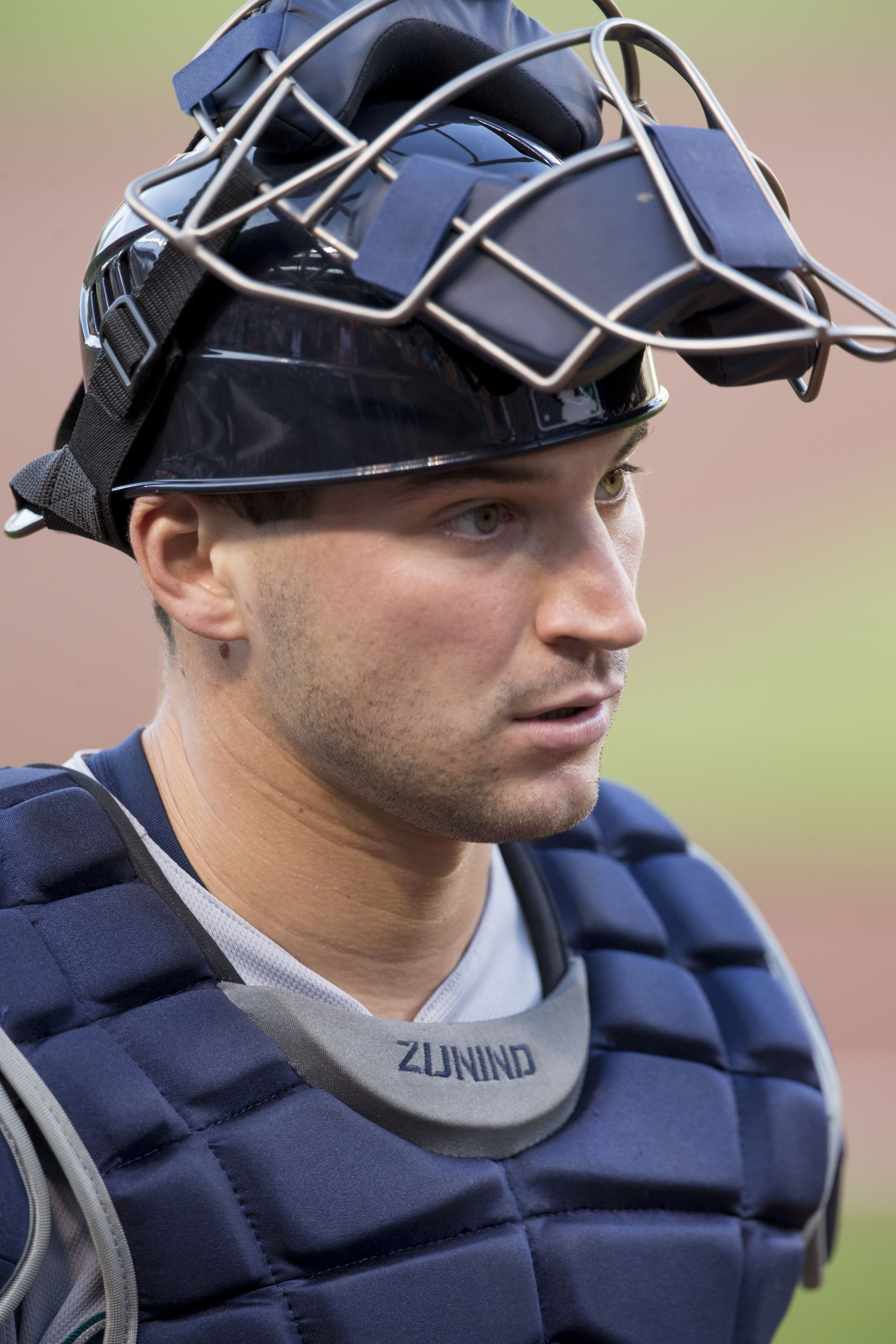
Mike Zunino played for Y-D in 2010

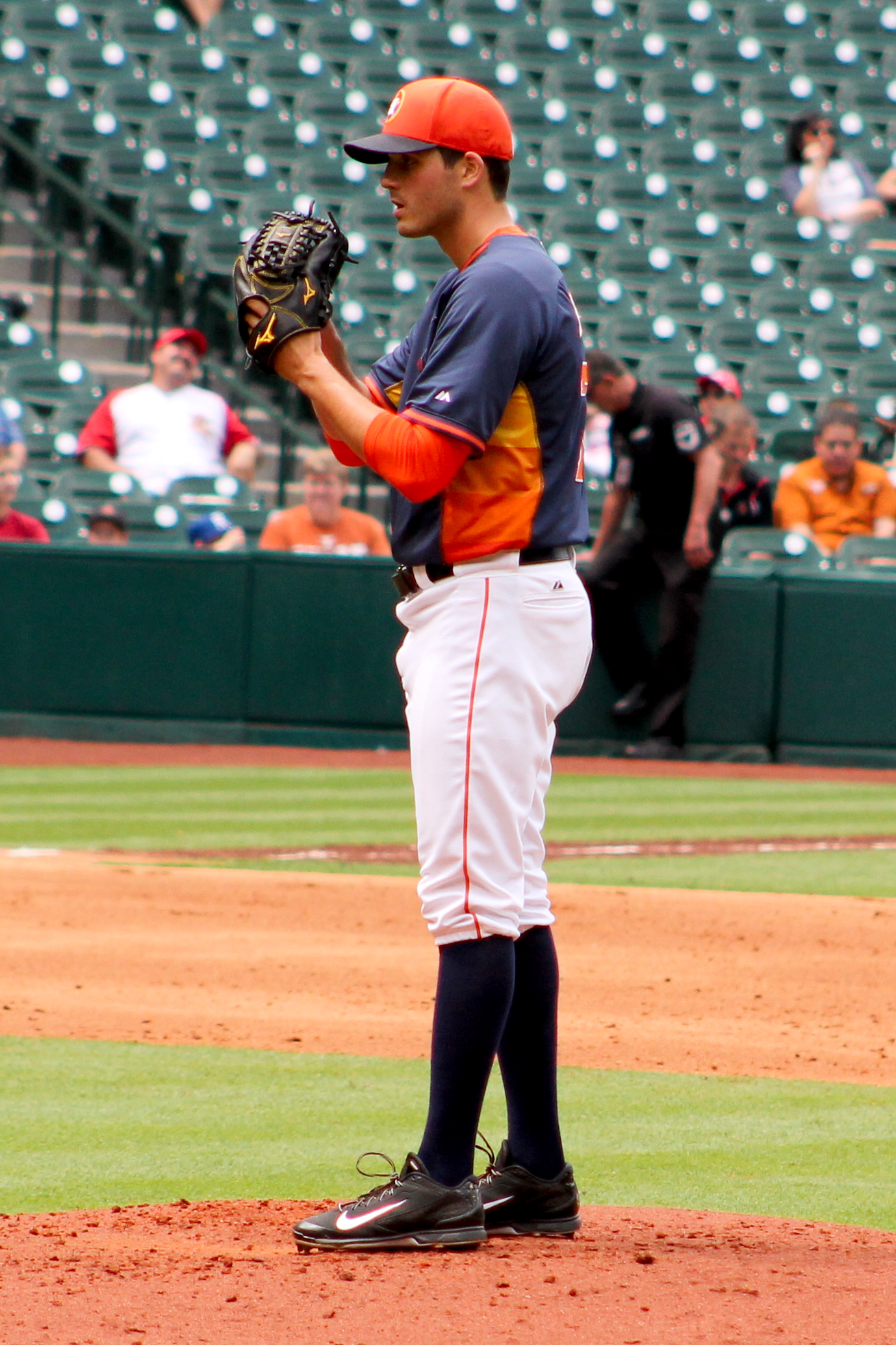
Mark Appel of the 2011 Y-D Red Sox was selected first overall in the 2013 MLB draft.

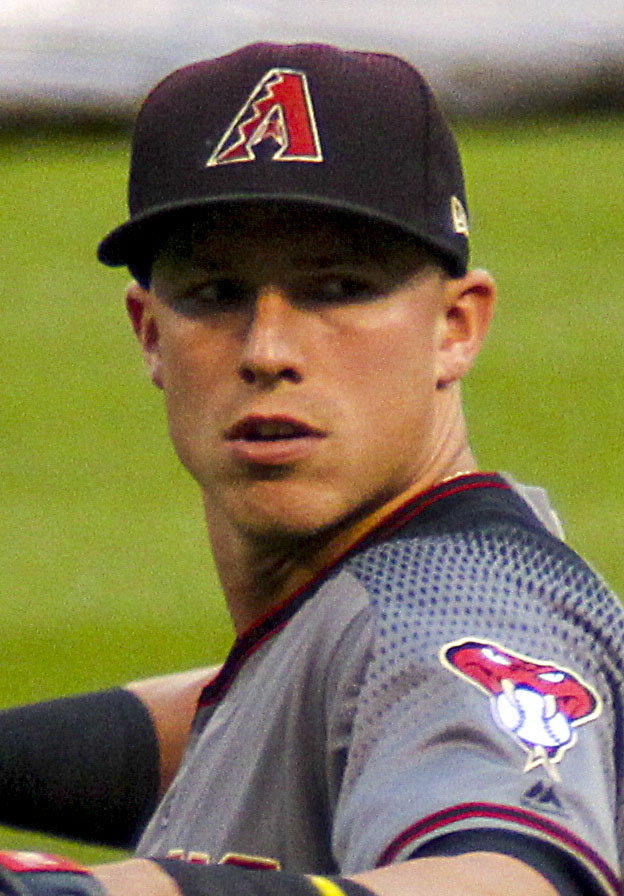
Jake Lamb, 2011 Y-D Red Sox

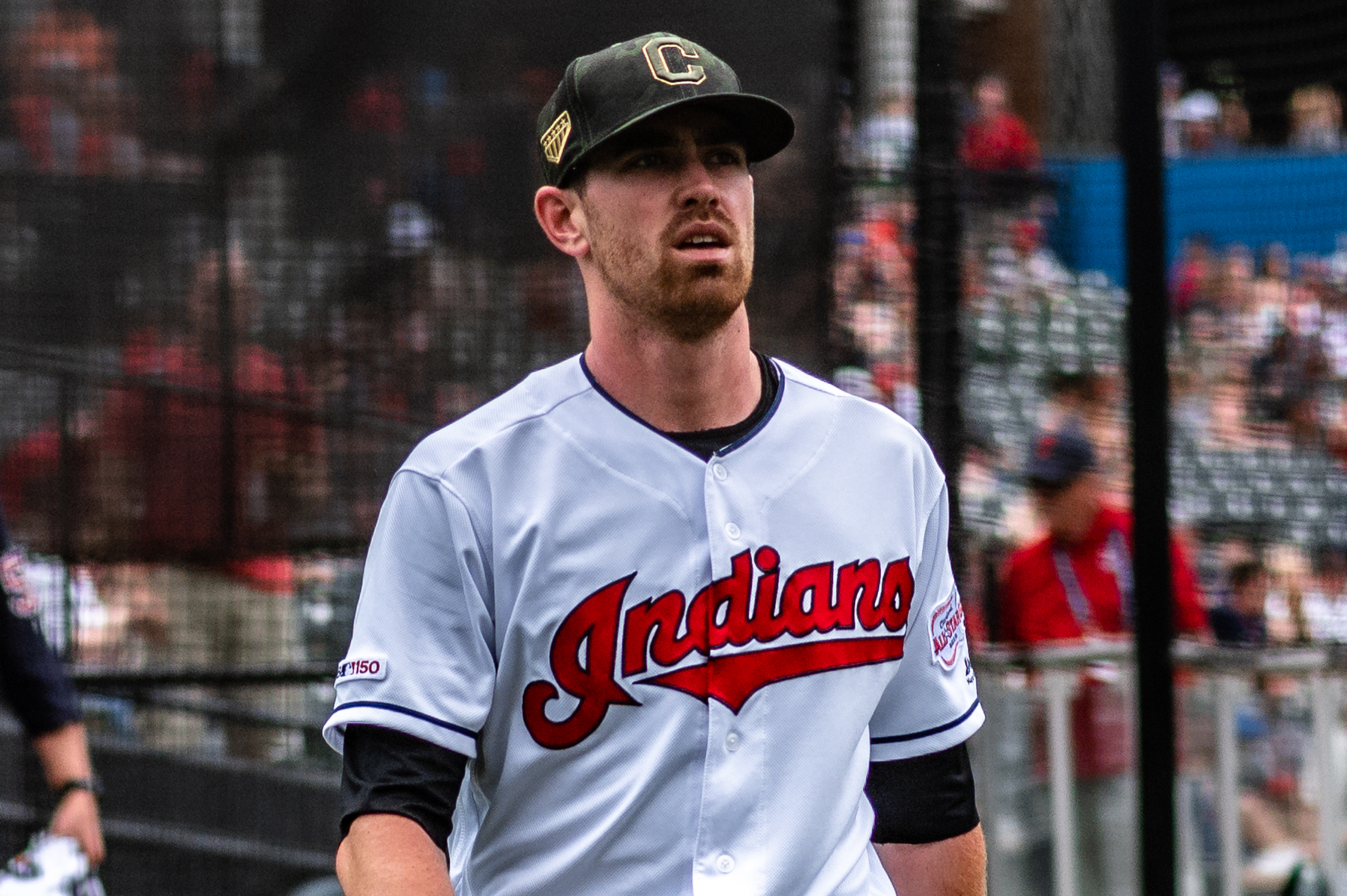
2015 Y-D hurler Shane Bieber

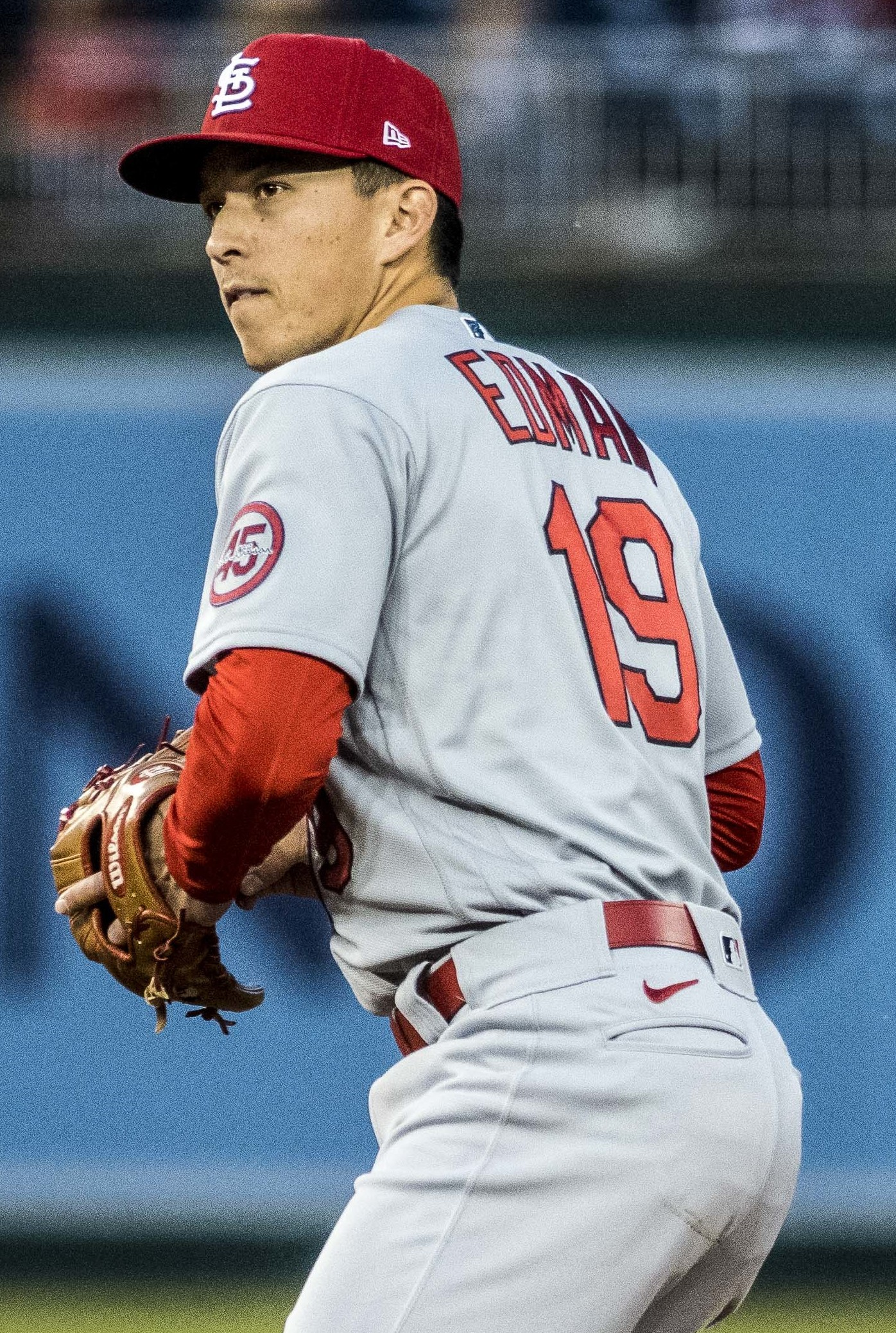
Tommy Edman was an all-star for Y-D's 2015 CCBL champions

=== Results by season, 1946–1962 ===
Yarmouth Indians
Year	Won	Lost	Regular Season Finish*	Postseason	Manager	Ref
1946	5	12	4th Lower Cape Division (A); 6th Lower Cape Division (B)		Oliver Hallett	
1947	7	12	4th Lower Cape Division (A); 5th Lower Cape Division (B)		Percy Brown	
1948	13	26	5th Lower Cape Division (A); 5th Lower Cape Division (B)		Percy Brown	
1949	15	23	6th Lower Cape Division		Ned Harrison	
1950	18	23	6th Lower Cape Division		Ned Harrison	
1951	13	23	4th Lower Cape Division (A); T-5th Lower Cape Division (B)		Ken Chase	
1952	17	13	6th Lower Cape Division (A); 2nd Lower Cape Division (B)		Al Marchant; Ted Reynolds	
1953	27	8	1st Lower Cape Division (A); 2nd Lower Cape Division (B)	Lost semi-finals (Orleans)	Ted Reynolds	
1954	20	14	2nd Lower Cape Division (A); 5th Lower Cape Division (B)			
1955	20	10	3rd Lower Cape Division	Won round 1 (Eastham); Lost semi-finals (Orleans)	Lloyd Dauphinais	
1956	19	17	3rd Lower Cape Division	Lost round 1 (Orleans)	Ted Reynolds	
1957	27	10	2nd Lower Cape Division	Won round 1 (Brewster); Lost semi-finals (Orleans)		
1958	16	14	3rd Lower Cape Division	Won round 1 (Brewster); Won semi-finals (Orleans); Won championship (Sagamore)	John Halunen	
1959	14	20	4th Lower Cape Division	Lost round 1 (Dennis)	John Halunen	
1960	18	14	1st Lower Cape Division	Won round 1 (Dennis); Won semi-finals (Harwich); Won championship (Sagamore)	John Halunen	
1961	26	4	1st Lower Cape Division	Won round 1 (Harwich); Won semi-finals (Orleans); Lost championship (Cotuit)	John Halunen	
1962	13	17	2nd Lower Cape Division (T)	Lost round 1 (Chatham)	John Halunen	

Dennis Clippers (1946–1961)
Year	Won	Lost	Regular Season Finish*	Postseason	Manager	Ref
1946					Ralph Richardson	
1947					Ralph Richardson	
1948					Thacher Chase	
1949					Joe Walker	
1950	23	19	4th Lower Cape Division		Russ Chase	
1951	19	17	T-5th Lower Cape Division (A); 1st Lower Cape Division (B)	Lost semi-finals (Orleans)		
1952					Bren Taylor; Bill Chapman	
1953	10	24	6th Lower Cape Division (A); 6th Lower Cape Division (B)		Bill Chapman	
1954					Bill Chapman	
1955	6	23	6th Lower Cape Division			
1956	25	11	2nd Lower Cape Division	Won round 1 (Brewster); Won semi-finals (Orleans); Lost championship (Sagamore)	Bren Taylor	
1957	18	16	4th Lower Cape Division	Lost round 1 (Orleans)		
1958	13	16	4th Lower Cape Division	Lost round 1 (Orleans)	Ron Blanchard	
1959	19	16	3rd Lower Cape Division	Won round 1 (Harwich); Lost semi-finals (Orleans)	Bill "Lefty" Lefebvre	
1960	16	16	4th Lower Cape Division	Lost round 1 (Yarmouth)	Bill "Lefty" Lefebvre	
1961	15	17	3rd Lower Cape Division	Lost round 1 (Orleans)	Bill Chapman	

* Regular seasons split into first and second halves are designated as (A) and (B).

=== Results by season, 1963–present ===
Year	Won	Lost	Tied	Regular Season Finish	Postseason	Manager
1963	7	24	0	5th Lower Cape Division		John Halunen
1964	18	15	0	3rd Lower Cape Division		Charlie Duchesney
1965	16	18	0	3rd Lower Cape Division		Charlie Duchesney
1966	12	22	0	4th Lower Cape Division		Merrill "Red" Wilson
1967	20	20	0	2nd Lower Cape Division (T)	Lost play-in game (Orleans)	Lou Lamoriello
1968	16	24	0	4th Lower Cape Division		Merrill "Red" Wilson
1969	21	22	0	3rd Lower Cape Division		Merrill "Red" Wilson
1970	13	26	0	6th League		Merrill "Red" Wilson
1971	15	23	3	6th League		Merrill "Red" Wilson
1972	15	24	3	6th League		Merrill "Red" Wilson
1973	19	20	3	4th League	Won semi-finals (Chatham); Lost championship (Cotuit)	Merrill "Red" Wilson
1974	16	23	3	7th League		Merrill "Red" Wilson
1975	20	20	2	4th League	Lost semi-finals (Falmouth)	Bob Stead
1976	10	27	4	8th League		Bob Stead
1977	21	17	3	3rd League	Won semi-finals (Chatham); Lost championship (Cotuit)	Bob Stead
1978	13	29	0	8th League		Bob Stead; Brian Sabean
1979	14	25	2	8th League		Merrill "Red" Wilson
1980	19	21	1	5th League		Merrill "Red" Wilson
1981	19	22	1	6th League		Merrill "Red" Wilson
1982	18	23	1	5th League (T)		Merrill "Red" Wilson
1983	18	18	5	5th League		Merrill "Red" Wilson
1984	13	28	1	8th League		Merrill "Red" Wilson
1985	14	27	1	7th League		Merrill "Red" Wilson
1986	15	23	3	8th League		Merrill "Red" Wilson
1987	24	15	0	2nd League	Won semi-finals (Hyannis); Lost championship (Harwich)	Don Reed
1988	22	18	0	1st East Division	Lost semi-finals (Orleans)	Don Reed
1989	28	15	1	1st East Division	Won semi-finals (Brewster); Won championship (Hyannis)	Don Reed
1990	24	16	3	1st East Division	Won semi-finals (Orleans); Won championship (Wareham)	Don Reed
1991	20	22	2	4th East Division		John Barlowe
1992	18	24	1	4th East Division		John Barlowe
1993	22	20	2	4th East Division		John Barlowe
1994	20	21	2	3rd East Division		John Barlowe
1995	17	24	2	3rd East Division		John Barlowe
1996	13	29	2	5th East Division		John Barlowe
1997	19	25	0	4th East Division		Steve Cohen
1998	21	23	0	4th East Division		Scott Pickler
1999	19	23	2	3rd East Division		Scott Pickler
2000	21	23	0	5th East Division		Scott Pickler
2001	25	19	0	1st East Division (T)	Lost semi-finals (Chatham)	Scott Pickler
2002	21	20	3	2nd East Division	Lost semi-finals (Orleans)	Scott Pickler
2003	21	22	1	4th East Division (T)		Scott Pickler
2004	26	17	1	1st East Division	Won semi-finals (Brewster); Won championship (Falmouth)	Scott Pickler
2005	20	23	1	4th East Division		Scott Pickler
2006	28	16	0	1st East Division	Won semi-finals (Brewster); Won championship (Wareham)	Scott Pickler
2007	31	12	1	1st East Division	Won semi-finals (Chatham); Won championship (Falmouth)	Scott Pickler
2008	18	25	1	5th East Division		Scott Pickler
2009	28	15	1	1st East Division	Lost semi-finals (Cotuit)	Scott Pickler
2010	27	17	0	1st East Division	Win round 1 (Harwich); Won semi-finals (Orleans); Lost championship (Cotuit)	Scott Pickler
2011	19	21	4	4th East Division	Won round 1 (Orleans); Lost semi-finals (Harwich)	Scott Pickler
2012	25	19	0	2nd East Division	Won round 1 (Chatham); Won semi-finals (Orleans); Lost championship (Wareham)	Scott Pickler
2013	20	22	2	4th East Division	Lost round 1 (Chatham)	Scott Pickler
2014	24	19	1	3rd East Division	Won round 1 (Orleans); Won semi-finals (Harwich); Won championship (Falmouth)	Scott Pickler
2015	22	22	0	3rd East Division (T)	Won round 1 (Brewster); Won semi-finals (Orleans); Won championship (Hyannis)	Scott Pickler
2016	26	17	1	2nd East Division	Won round 1 (Orleans); Won semi-finals (Chatham); Won championship (Falmouth)	Scott Pickler
2017	27	16	1	2nd East Division	Lost round 1 (Brewster)	Scott Pickler
2018	27	12	5	1st East Division	Lost round 1 (Brewster)	Scott Pickler
2019	22	19	3	3rd East Division	Won round 1 (Orleans); Lost semi-finals (Harwich)	Scott Pickler
2020	Season cancelled due to coronavirus pandemic					
2021	16	14	7	3rd East Division		Scott Pickler
2022	19	17	8	1st East Division (T)	Won round 1 (Orleans); Lost semi-finals (Brewster)	Scott Pickler
2023	24	19	1	1st East Division	Won round 1 (Brewster); Lost semi-finals (Orleans)	Scott Pickler
2024	24	12	4	1st East Division	Won round 1 (Orleans); Lost semi-finals (Harwich)	Scott Pickler
2025	19	18	3	4th East Division	Won round 1 (Orleans); Won semi-finals (Harwich); Lost championship (Bourne)	Scott Pickler
2026	28	11	1	1st East Division	Won round 1 (Chatham); Lost semi-finals (Harwich)	Scott Pickler

== League award winners ==
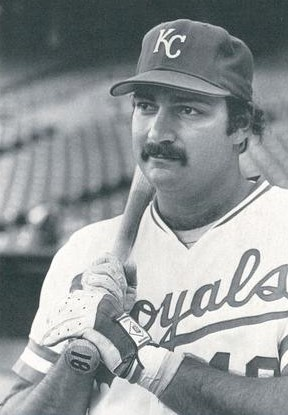
CCBL Hall of Famer Steve Balboni was league MVP and Outstanding Pro Prospect in 1977

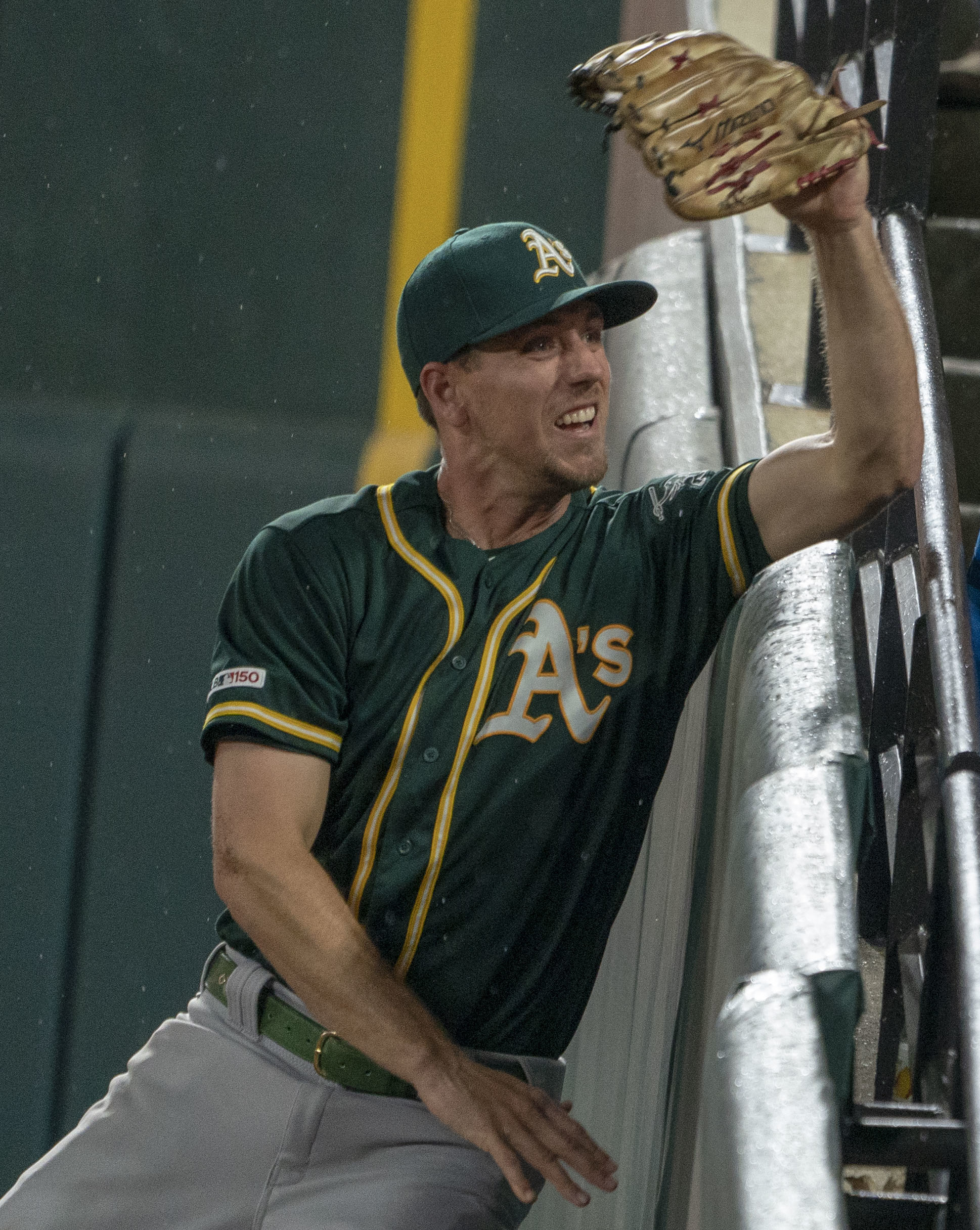
Y-D's Stephen Piscotty wore the CCBL batting crown in 2011

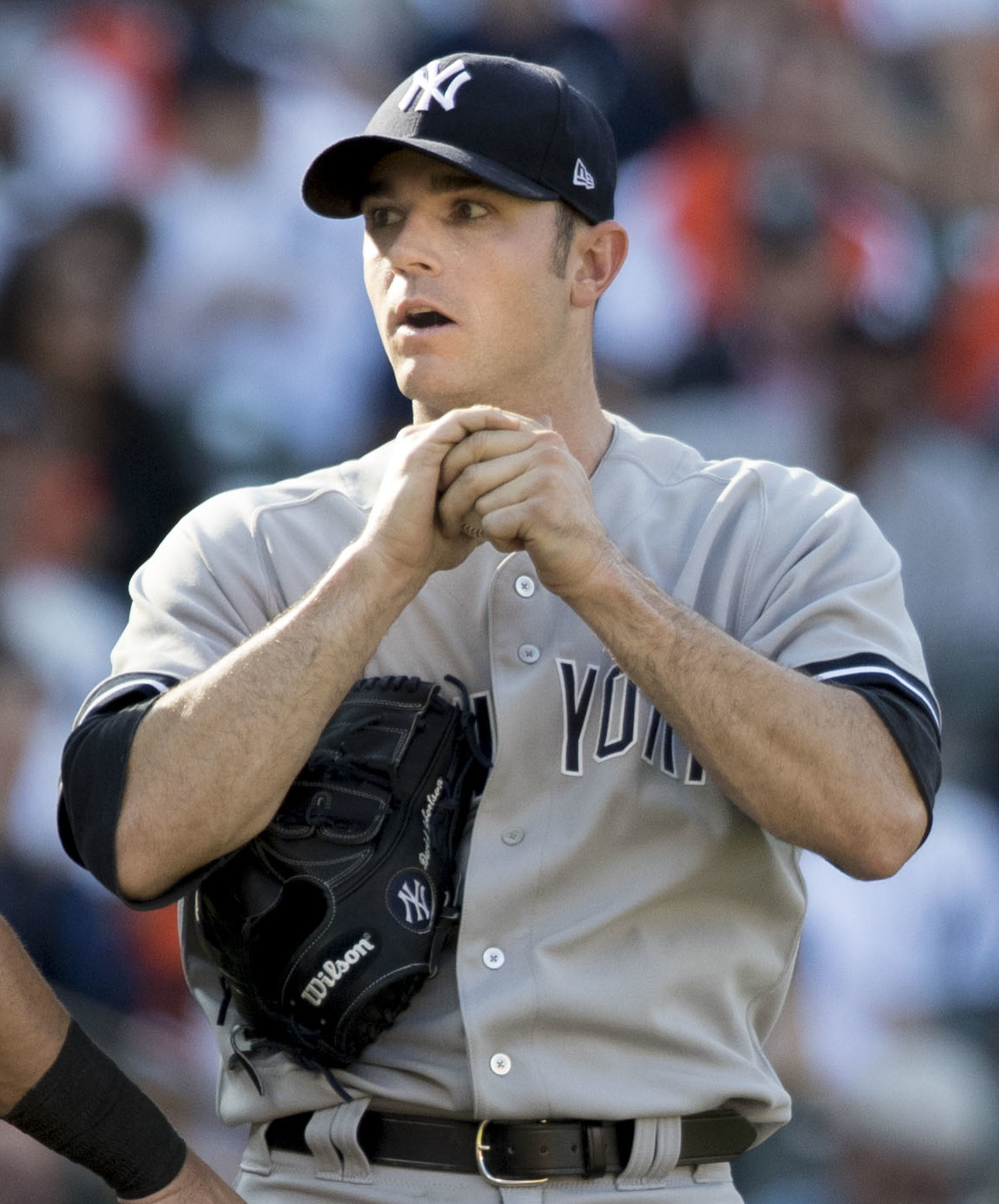
Y-D's David Robertson was CCBL playoff MVP in 2006

The Pat Sorenti MVP Award
Year	Player
1977	Steve Balboni
1987	Mickey Morandini
1989	Kurt Olson
1991	Brent Killen
2024	Ethan Petry

The Robert A. McNeece Outstanding Pro Prospect Award
Year	Player
1977	Steve Balboni*
1993	Chris Clemons
2002	Wes Whisler
2014	Phil Bickford
2019	Austin Wells
2024	Ethan Petry

The BFC Whitehouse Outstanding Pitcher Award
Year	Player
1993	Andy Taulbee
2006	Terry Doyle*
2009	Chris Sale
2017	Kris Bubic
2025	Tyler Pitzer

The Russ Ford Outstanding Relief Pitcher Award
Year	Player
2006	Joshua Fields
2007	Nick Cassavechia
2009	Tyler Burgoon
2014	Phil Bickford*
2017	Riley McCauley*
2024	Trevor Moore

The Daniel J. Silva Sportsmanship Award
Year	Player
1981	Joe Sickles*
1990	Mark Sweeney
2010	Joe Panik
2012	Zak Blair

The Manny Robello 10th Player Award
Year	Player
1988	Steve O'Donnell
2000	John Baker
2001	Adam Bourassa

The John J. Claffey Outstanding New England Player Award
Year	Player
2004	Frank Curreri
2009	Mickey Wiswall
2010	Matt Watson

The Thurman Munson Award for Batting Champion
Year	Player
1974	Pete Ross (.357)
1987	Mickey Morandini (.376)
1994	Jon Petke (.379)
1997	Jason McConnell (.345)
2011	Stephen Piscotty (.349)

All-Star Game MVP Award
Year	Player
1977	Steve Balboni
1987	Joe Hall
1997	Edmund Muth
2003	Garrett Mock
2004	Frank Curreri
2009	Chris Sale
2010	Caleb Ramsey
2011	James Ramsey
2012	Alex Blandino
2015	Donnie Walton
2024	Easton Carmichael

All-Star Home Run Hitting Contest Champion
Year	Player
1992	Todd Greene
1996	Eddy Furniss
2000	Jason Cooper
2001	Jason Cooper
2024	Ethan Petry

The Star of Stars Playoff MVP Award
Year	Player
1989	Mark Sweeney
1990	Kirk Piskor
2004	Ryan Rohlinger*
2004	Joshua Faiola*
2006	David Robertson
2007	Trevor Holder
2014	Walker Buehler*
2014	Marcus Mastrobuoni*
2015	Ben Bowden*
2015	Donnie Walton*
2016	Kevin Smith

(*) - Indicates co-recipient

== All-Star Game selections ==
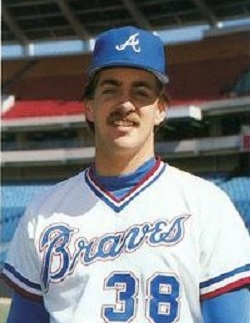
Brookline, Massachusetts native Joe Johnson was an all-star for Y-D in 1981.

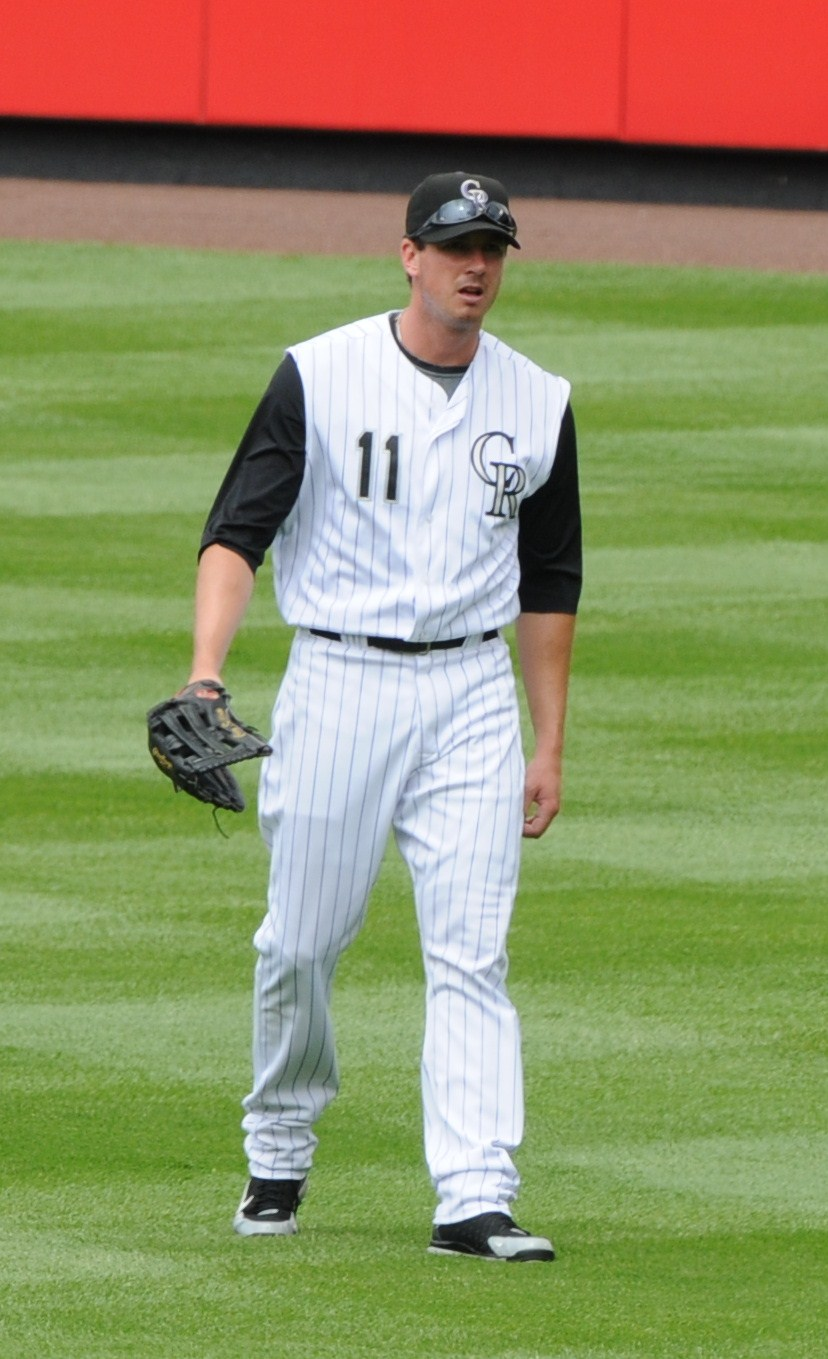
Brad Hawpe represented Y-D in the 1999 CCBL All-Star Home Run Derby.

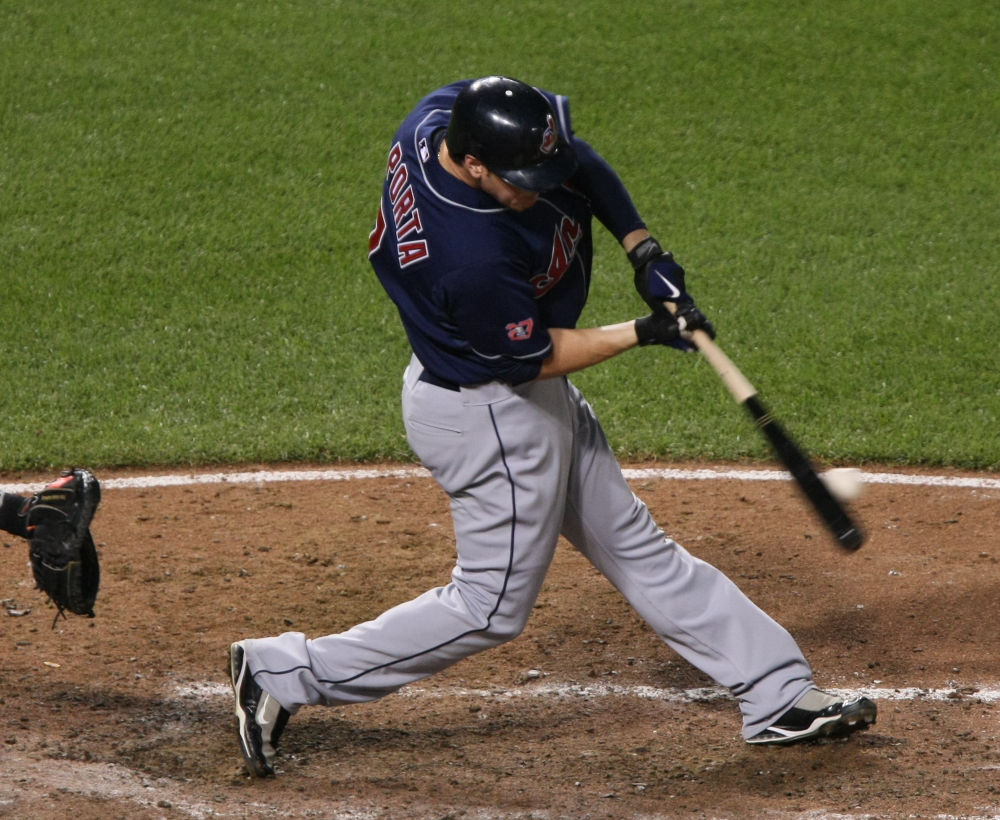
Y-D's Matt LaPorta was East Division starting DH at the 2004 CCBL All-Star Game.

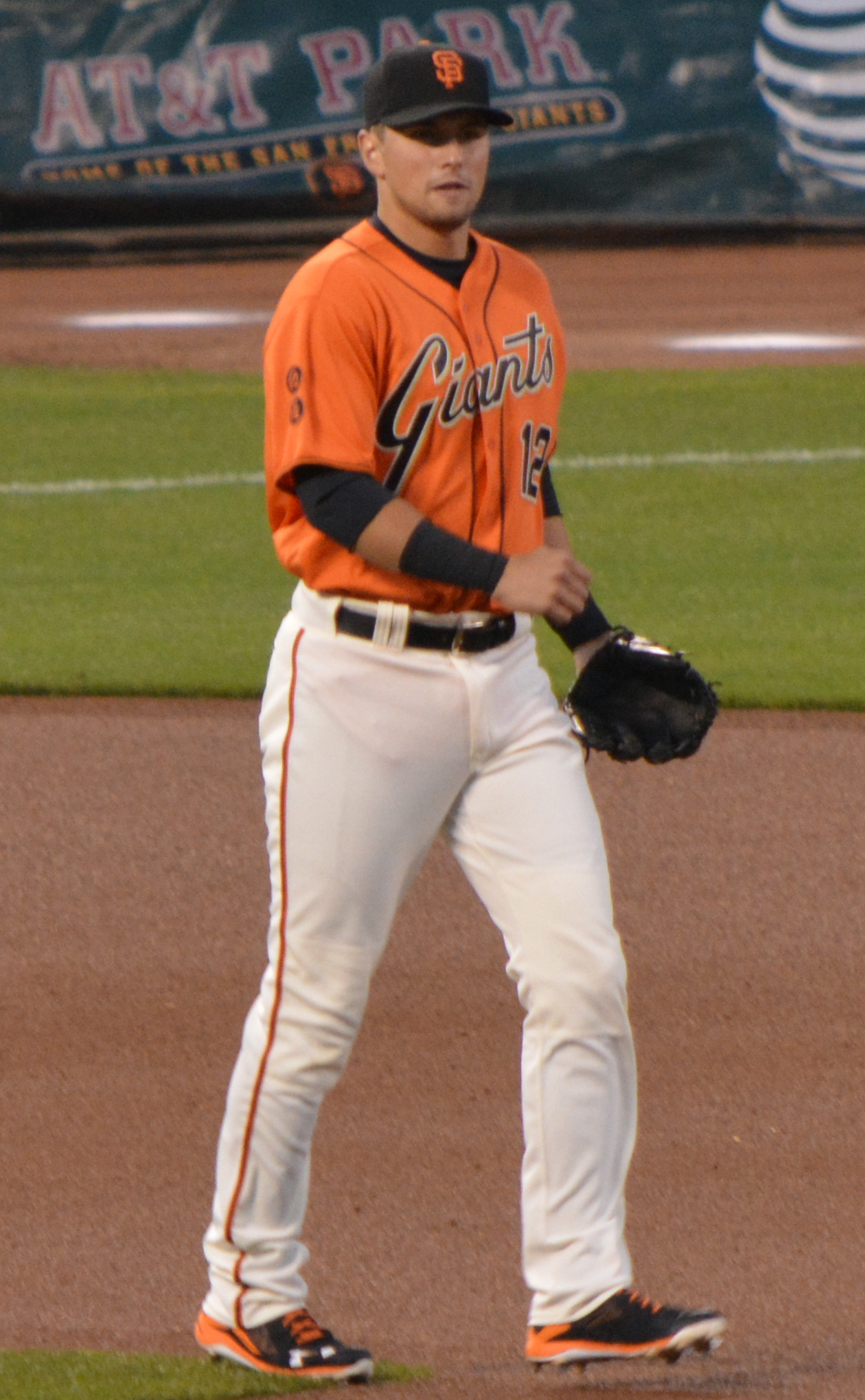
Joe Panik was a CCBL all-star for Y-D in 2010, and won the league's Sportsmanship Award.

Year	Players	Ref
1963	Gerry Lima	
1964	Ronald Maurer, Dennis Lynch, Gerry Lima, Robert Fenton	
1965	Ronald Maurer, Dennis Lynch, Peter Haigis, Carter Lord, Richard Pohle, Joe Jabar	
1966	Tony Plansky Jr., Dick Rappoli, John Zarzicki	
1967	Dan DeMichele, Bill Pettingill, Bud Pepin, Steve Rogers, Bill Flood	
1968	Dan DeMichele, Rick Fusari, Doug Ross, Nick Baiad	
1969	Rick Fusari, Dan Whitworth, Billy Gray, John Keith, Curt Tucker	
1970	Jim Chaplin, Jim Eschen, Brian Martin	
1971	Greg Crowley, Dana Corey	
1972	Bob Mollenhauer, Mark Kilmurray, Ed LaVigne	
1973	Dave Merullo, Dave Schuler, Butch Bornstein	
1974	John Hannon, Pete Ross, Tom Burke	
1975	Ron Jacobs, Kent Seaman, Craig Giola	
1976	(None)	
1977	Don Murelli, Steve Balboni, Jim Kropog, Barry LaCasse	
1978	Don Murelli, Kevin O'Brien	
1979	Paul Bard	
1980	Gerry Melillo, Mike Coutts, Mike Schmid	
1981	Mark Angelo, Joe Sickles, Joe Johnson	
1982	Mark Angelo	
1983	Jerry Holtz, Dale Cross	
1984	(None)	
1985	Mark Hatje	
1986	Jim Mahood, Steve Loubier	
1987	Steve Callahan, Joe Hall, Mickey Morandini	
1988	Mitch Hannahs, Nolan Lane, Eric Wedge, Steve O'Donnell	
1989	Mike Losa, Paul Gonzalez, Kurt Olson, Eric Rasberry, Brad Stuart	
1990	Mike Losa, Tim Smith, Mark Sweeney, Mike Durant, Brad Seitzer, Marc Pisciotta, Larry Thomas	
1991	Brent Killen, Jon Sbrocco, Chad Fonville, Jeremy Carr, Mickey Tomey, Chris Petersen, Alan Benes, Mike Kotarski, Matt Raleigh	
1992	Phil Grundy, Todd Greene	
1993	Shane Monahan, Andy Taulbee, Chris Clemons	
1994	Jon Petke, Adam McCollough, Rowan Richards, Mark Watson, Morgan Walker	
1995	Chad Green, Eric Parker	
1996	Luke Hudson, Donnie Bivins, Tom Sergio, Eddy Furniss	
1997	Edmund Muth, Tony Schrager, Donald Rushing, Justin Lehr, Jason McConnell, Morgan Ensberg	
1998	Corey Slavic, Daylan Holt, Chris Curry, Chance Capel, Hank Thoms, Edmund Muth	
1999	Jamie Rock, Mitch Jones, Jeff Duncan, Bryan Kennedy, Brad Hawpe	
2000	J.T. Stotts, Brandon Luna, Cory Sullivan, Jake Gann, Travis Wong, Jason Cooper	
2001	Adam Bourassa, Brandon Luna, Hyung Cho, John Baker, Steve Sollmann, Drew Endicott, Jim Brauer, Jason Cooper	
2002	Adam Bourassa, Brett Cooley, John Hudgins, Jamie Vermilyea, Wes Whisler	
2003	Chris Malec, Hyung Cho, Curtis Thigpen, Sean Gamble, Trevor Crowe, Justin Meier, Jim Brauer, Garrett Mock, Chris Carter	
2004	Frank Curreri, Adam Davis, Ryan Rohlinger, Justin Blaine, Justin Keadle, Matt LaPorta	
2005	Jeff Kindel, Danny Lehmann, Jordan Abruzzo, Chris Errecart, Tim Gustafson, Brandon Morrow	
2006	Buster Posey, Danny Lehmann, Luke Sommer, Brad Emaus, Josh Fields, Terry Doyle, Nate Boman, Donnie Hume	
2007	Buster Posey, Jason Castro, Gordon Beckham, Collin Cowgill, Eddie Burns, Sean Ochinko, Nick Cassavechia	
2008	Tony Sanchez, Nick Liles, Ryan Ortiz, DeAngelo Mack	
2009	Tyler Hanover, Mickey Wiswall, Blake Kelso, Austin Wates, Chris Sale, John Leonard, Tyler Burgoon	
2010	Tyler Hanover, Joe Panik, Caleb Ramsey, Jordan Ribera	
2011	Stephen Piscotty, James Ramsey, Cody Keefer, Mason Katz	
2012	Alex Blandino, Zak Blair, Sam Travis, Tanner Mathis, Robert Pehl, Aaron Blair, Carlos Asuaje, Bryan Verbitsky	
2013	Alex Blandino, Cole Peragine, D. J. Stewart, Andrew Daniel, Wayne Taylor, James Kaprielian, Dan Savas	
2014	Jordan Tarsovich, Rob Fonseca, Andrew Stevenson, Justin Jacome, Phil Bickford	
2015	Tommy Edman, Donnie Walton, Cole Billingsley, Gio Brusa, Ricky Thomas	
2016	Kevin Smith, Matt Winnaker, Tyler Houston, Bryan Pall	
2017	Kris Bubic, Nico Hoerner, Alex McKenna, Kyle Isbel, Brendan Nail, Riley McCauley	
2018	Noah Campbell, Andrew Daschbach, Jonny DeLuca, Christian Koss, Quin Cotton, Jensen Elliott, Trent Denholm, Ty Madrigal, Sam Kessler	
2019	Noah Campbell, Austin Wells, Riley King, Wyatt Young	
2020	Season cancelled due to coronavirus pandemic	
2021	Wyatt Hoffman, Kody Huff, Christian Culpepper, Reid McLaughlin, Luis Ramirez	
2022	Luke Shliger, Cole Carrigg, Hunter Haas, Homer Bush Jr., Jared Lyons, Bryce Robison, Luke Jewett	
2023	Enzo Apodaca, RJ Austin, Landon Beidelschies, Brady Day, Leighton Finley, Hunter Hines	
2024	Aiven Cabral, Easton Carmichael, Trevor Moore, Braden Osbolt, Sean Youngerman, Ethan Petry	
2025	Dean Carpentier, Yomar Carreras, Dominic Desch, Brady Hamilton, Tyler Pitzer	
2026	Connor Hamilton, Avery Ortiz, Peyton Rogers, Mateo Sema, Jake Souders, Kevin Takeuchi, Easton Teel, Andrew Wright	

Italics - Indicates All-Star Game Home Run Hitting Contest participant (1988 to present)

== No-hit games ==
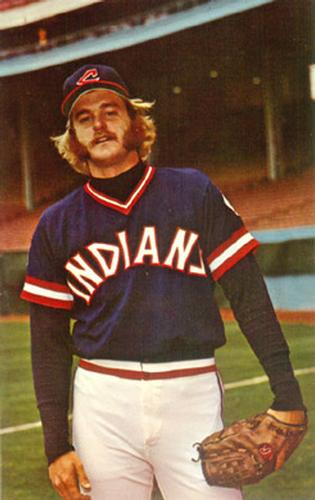
Stan Thomas tossed a no-hitter for Yarmouth in 1968.

Year	Pitcher	Opponent	Score	Location	Notes	Ref
1952	Ted Reynolds	North Truro AFS	9–0			
1953	Cal Burlingame	Chatham	4–1			
1954	Cal Burlingame	Eastham	1–0			
1957	Jerry Rood	Brewster	2–0			
1960	Charlie Richards (Dennis)	Chatham	9–0			
1961	Dick Cassani	Orleans	3–0	Simpkins Field	Playoff game	
1964	Bob Fenton	Otis AFB	3–0	Otis AFB		
1967	Bill Pettingell	Bourne	5–0	Keith Field		
1968	Stan Thomas	Chatham	2–0	Simpkins Field		
1970	Fred Thatcher	Chatham	4–3	Simpkins Field	5-inning game; Combined	
1970	Brian Martin	Chatham	4–3	Simpkins Field	5-inning game; Combined	
1994	Mark Watson	Harwich	6–0	Whitehouse Field		
1998	Hank Thoms	Orleans	6–0	Eldredge Park		
2002	Jim Brauer	Chatham	7–0	Veterans Field		
2006	Terry Doyle	Chatham	2–0	Red Wilson Field		
2010	Jordan Pries	Orleans	2–0	Eldredge Park		

== Managerial history ==
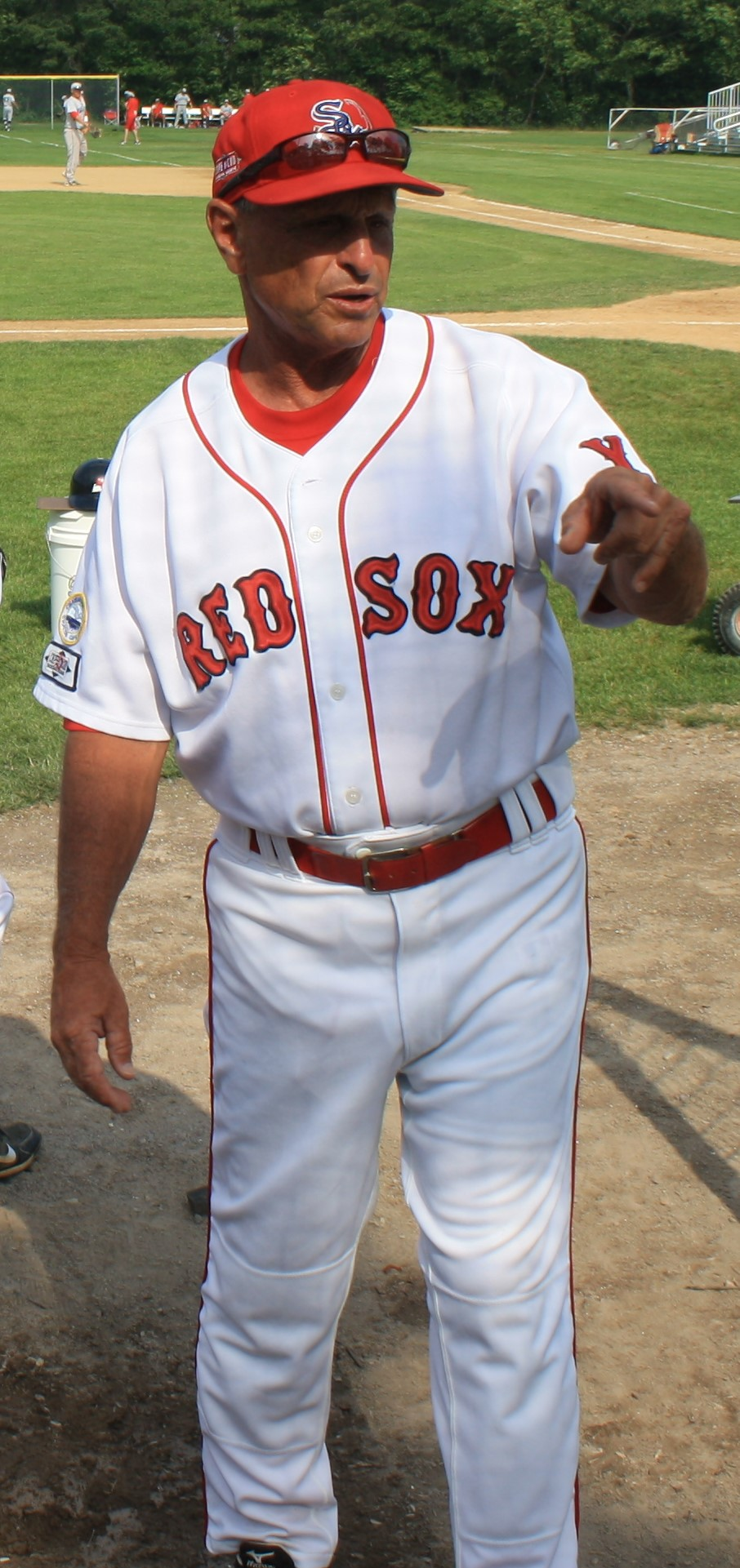
CCBL Hall of Fame skipper Scott Pickler has led Y-D to six league titles

Manager	Seasons	Total Seasons	Championship Seasons
John Halunen	1958–1963	6	1958, 1960
Charlie Duchesney	1964–1965	2	
Merrill "Red" Wilson	1966; 1968–1974; 1979–1986	16	
Lou Lamoriello	1967	1	
Bob Stead	1975–1978	4	
Brian Sabean	1978	1	
Don Reed	1987–1990	4	1989, 1990
John Barlowe	1991–1996	6	
Steve Cohen	1997	1	
Scott Pickler	1998–2026	28*	2004, 2006, 2007, 2014, 2015, 2016

(*) - Season count excludes 2020 CCBL season cancelled due to coronavirus pandemic.

== Fan culture ==
Red Wilson Field is the official home of the Sinker Burger, the Hurler Burger, and the Boston Screamer. Introduced during the 2004 season, the Sinker is a hamburger served on a lightly toasted cake doughnut, with three varieties: inside, down-the-middle, and outside (cinnamon, powder, and plain). The Hurler, also introduced in 2004, is a hamburger patty served between the halves of a jelly doughnut, finished with a squirt of canned cheese. The Boston Screamer, which made its official debut in 2010, is a hamburger served on a Boston cream doughnut. On July 19, 2011, the Yarmouth–Dennis Red Sox served their 6000th "upgraded" hamburger.

== In popular culture ==
- In the 2001 movie Summer Catch, scenes where the Chatham A's play on the road at Y-D were filmed at Red Wilson Field.
- The Red Sox hosted the 2006 CCBL All-Star Game, which was broadcast on National Public Radio on Cape Cod. The game was broadcast by the team's play-by-play announcer, Dan Rubin, and the League's Director of Public Relations, John Garner.
- The Red Sox hosted the CCBL All-Star Game in 2013, which was aired live across the country on Fox College Sports.

== See also ==
- Yarmouth–Dennis Red Sox players
