= 2000 Stanford Cardinal baseball team =

American college baseball season

2000 Stanford Cardinal baseball

Pac-10 champion Palo Alto Regional champion Palo Alto Super Regional champion

College World Series, 2nd
- Conference: Pacific-10 Conference

Ranking
- Coaches: No. 2
- CB: No. 2
- Record: 50–16 (17–7 Pac-10)
- Head coach: Mark Marquess (24th season)
- Home stadium: Sunken Diamond

2000 Pacific-10 Conference baseball standings
	Conf.				Overall
Team	W		L	PCT	W		L	PCT
No. 2 Stanford ‍†‍‍^{y}	17	–	7	.708	50	–	16	.758
No. 12 Arizona State ‍†‍‍^{y}	17	–	7	.708	44	–	15	.746
No. 16 UCLA ‍†‍‍^{y}	17	–	7	.708	38	–	26	.594
No. 5 Southern California ‍‍‍^{y}	16	–	8	.667	44	–	20	.688
California ‍‍‍	11	–	13	.458	25	–	28	.472
Oregon State ‍‍‍	9	–	15	.375	28	–	27	.509
Arizona ‍‍‍	8	–	16	.333	26	–	30	.464
Washington ‍‍‍	7	–	17	.292	26	–	30	.464
Washington State ‍‍‍	6	–	18	.250	20	–	36	.357
† – Conference champion y – Invited to the NCAA tournament As of June 19, 2000; Rankings from Collegiate Baseball

The 2000 Stanford Cardinal baseball team represented Stanford University in the 2000 NCAA Division I baseball season. The Cardinal played their home games at Sunken Diamond in Palo Alto, California. The team was coached by Mark Marquess in his twenty-fourth season as head coach at Stanford.

The Cardinal reached the College World Series, finishing as the runner up to LSU.

== Roster ==
2000 Stanford Cardinal roster
- Damien Alvarado; - Eric Bruntlett; - Jason Cooper; - Billy Jacobson; - Ryan McCally; - Edmund Muth; - Chris O'Riordan; - Brian Sager; - Craig Thompson; - Andy Topham; - Arik VanZandt; - Mike Wodnicki	Pitchers: - Jeff Bruksch; - Tim Cunningham; - Mike Gosling; - Jason Luker; - Justin Wayne; - Jason Young; Infielders Catchers Outfielders: - Joe Borchard; - John Gall

== Schedule ==
Legend
Stanford win
Stanford loss

2000 Stanford Cardinal baseball game log: 50–16
Regular season: 42–13

January/February: 11–5
Date	Opponent	Rank	Site/stadium	Score	Win	Loss	Save	Attendance	Overall record	Pac-10 record
Jan 28	at Fresno State*	No. 1	Pete Beiden Field • Fresno, CA	W 10–2	Young (1–0)	Graham (0–1)	None	4,011	1–0	—
Jan 29	at Fresno State*	No. 1	Pete Beiden Field • Fresno, CA	W 7–1	Wayne (1–0)	Hannah (0–1)	None	3,670	2–0	—
Feb 4	No. 2 Cal State Fullerton*	No. 1	Sunken Diamond • Stanford, CA	W 5–4	Bruksch (1–0)	Saarloos (0–1)	None	1,942	3–0	—
Feb 5	No. 2 Cal State Fullerton*	No. 1	Sunken Diamond • Stanford, CA	W 3–1	Wayne (2–0)	Smith (0–1)	Cunningham (1)	1,106	4–0	—
Feb 6	No. 2 Cal State Fullerton*	No. 1	Sunken Diamond • Stanford, CA	W 7–3	Sager (1–0)	Corona (0–1)	Bruksch (1)	2,327	5–0	—
Feb 7	Nevada*	No. 1	Sunken Diamond • Stanford, CA	L 3–4	Moran (1–1)	Rich (0–1)	Church (1)	1,123	5–1	—
Feb 11	at No. 6 Florida State*	No. 1	Dick Howser Stadium • Tallahassee, FL	L 4–11	McDonald (2–0)	Gosling (0–1)	Hodges (1)	4,324	5–2	—
Feb 12	at No. 6 Florida State*	No. 1	Dick Howser Stadium • Tallahassee, FL	W 8–6	Bruksch (2–0)	Ginn (1–1)	None	4,579	6–2	—
Feb 13	at No. 6 Florida State*	No. 1	Dick Howser Stadium • Tallahassee, FL	L 1–13	Ziegler (2–0)	Sager (1–1)	None	4,182	6–3	—
Feb 18	No. 8 Texas*	No. 3	Sunken Diamond • Stanford, CA	W 8–2	Wayne (3–0)	Hale (1–1)	None	1,834	7–3	—
Feb 19	No. 8 Texas*	No. 3	Sunken Diamond • Stanford, CA	L 2–3	Jones (2–2)	Burksch (2–1)	Thames (3)	2,288	7–4	—
Feb 21	at Sacramento State*	No. 2	John Smith Field • Sacramento, CA	W 4–2	Luker (1–0)	Robinson (0–2)	Gosling (1)	829	8–4	—
Feb 25	at California*	No. 2	Evans Diamond • Berkeley, CA	W 6–2	Wayne (4–0)	Hutchinson (1–2)	Bruksch (2)	510	9–4	—
Feb 26	at California*	No. 2	Evans Diamond • Berkeley, CA	W 4–1	Sager (2–1)	Steele (2–3)	Gosling (2)	469	10–4	—
Feb 27	at California*	No. 2	Evans Diamond • Berkeley, CA	W 8–2	Cunningham (1–0)	Shirley (0–3)	Bruksch (3)	498	11–4	—
Feb 29	San Jose State*	No. 2	Sunken Diamond • Stanford, CA	L 1–4	Murphy (1–0)	Rich (0–2)	Adinolfi (3)	1,216	11–5	—

March: 10–2
Date	Opponent	Rank	Site/stadium	Score	Win	Loss	Save	Attendance	Overall record	Pac-10 record
Mar 3	Santa Clara*	No. 2	Sunken Diamond • Stanford, CA	W 1–0	Wayne (5–0)	Travis (1–3)	None	1,601	12–5	—
Mar 4	at Santa Clara*	No. 2	Buck Shaw Stadium • Santa Clara, CA	W 6–4	Sager (3–1)	Kelley (0–3)	Bruksch (4)	610	13–5	—
Mar 5	Santa Clara*	No. 2	Sunken Diamond • Stanford, CA	W 8–3	Young (2–0)	Diefenderfer (1–4)	Luker (1)	1,523	14–5	—
Mar 17	No. 12 Southern California*	No. 3	Sunken Diamond • Stanford, CA	W 4–3	Wayne (6–0)	Prior (4–2)	None	1,624	15–5	—
Mar 18	No. 12 Southern California*	No. 3	Sunken Diamond • Stanford, CA	L 7–11	Montrenes (2–0)	Cunningham (1–1)	Petke (2)	2,516	15–6	—
Mar 19	No. 12 Southern California*	No. 3	Sunken Diamond • Stanford, CA	W 11–4	Gosling (1–1)	Reyes (2–3)	None	2,244	16–6	—
Mar 21	at Saint Mary's*	No. 4	Louis Guisto Field • Moraga, CA	W 11–3	Wodnicki (1–0)	Bowden (3–2)	None	256	17–6	—
Mar 24	Arizona	No. 4	Sunken Diamond • Stanford, CA	L 5–8	Diggins (7–0)	Wayne (6–1)	Milo (3)	1,638	17–7	0–1
Mar 25	Arizona	No. 4	Sunken Diamond • Stanford, CA	W 6–4	Young (3–0)	Crawford (4–5)	None	2,052	18–7	1–1
Mar 26	Arizona	No. 4	Sunken Diamond • Stanford, CA	W 7–1	Gosling (2–1)	Shabansky (1–2)	None	2,212	19–7	2–1
Mar 28	Saint Mary's*	No. 4	Sunken Diamond • Stanford, CA	W 5–2	Wodnicki (2–0)	LaRochette (0–1)	Bruksch (5)	1,256	20–7	—
Mar 31	at No. 8 Arizona State*	No. 4	Packard Stadium • Tempe, AZ	W 5–1	Wayne (7–1)	Switzer (6–1)	None	3,289	21–7	3–1

April: 13–4
Date	Opponent	Rank	Site/stadium	Score	Win	Loss	Save	Attendance	Overall record	Pac-10 record
Apr 1	at No. 8 Arizona State	No. 4	Packard Stadium • Tempe, AZ	L 6–10	Doble (3–1)	Bruksch (2–2)	None	3,017	21–8	3–2
Apr 2	at No. 8 Arizona State	No. 4	Packard Stadium • Tempe, AZ	L 6–11	Pezely (3–2)	Gosling (2–2)	None	3,897	21–9	3–3
Apr 4	Sacramento State*	No. 6	Sunken Diamond • Stanford, CA	W 18–2	Luker (2–0)	Cuckovich (3–1)	None	1,461	22–9	—
Apr 7	at Washington State	No. 6	Bailey–Brayton Field • Pullman, WA	W 14–3	Wayne (8–1)	Meldahl (1–4)	None	831	23–9	4–3
Apr 8	at Washington State	No. 6	Bailey–Brayton Field • Pullman, WA	W 11–3	Young (4–0)	O'Brien (6–2)	None	999	24–9	5–3
Apr 9	at Washington State	No. 6	Bailey–Brayton Field • Pullman, WA	W 16–0	Cunningham (2–1)	Thompson (1–6)	None	581	25–9	6–3
Apr 11	at San Jose State*	No. 5	San Jose Municipal Stadium • San Jose, CA	W 5–2	Drew (1–0)	Sandler (1–2)	Bruksch (6)	652	26–9	—
Apr 14	Washington	No. 5	Sunken Diamond • Stanford, CA	W 6–5	Wayne (9–1)	Grant (1–3)	Bruksch (7)	1,714	27–9	7–3
Apr 15	Washington	No. 5	Sunken Diamond • Stanford, CA	W 7–2	Young (5–0)	Massingale (3–5)	None	1,625	28–9	8–3
Apr 16	Washington	No. 5	Sunken Diamond • Stanford, CA	W 9–4	Cunningham (3–1)	White (1–1)	Bruksch (8)	1,688	29–9	9–3
Apr 20	at No. 22 Southern California	No. 4	Dedeaux Field • Los Angeles, CA	L 3–7	Currier (10–2)	Wayne (9–2)	Montrenes (2)	788	29–10	9–4
Apr 21	at No. 22 Southern California	No. 4	Dedeaux Field • Los Angeles, CA	W 4–1	Young (6–0)	Prior	Bruksch (9)		30–10	10–4
Apr 22	at No. 22 Southern California	No. 4	Dedeaux Field • Los Angeles, CA	W 18–4	Cunningham (4–1)	Reyes (3–6)	Gosling (3)	1,002	31–10	11–4
Apr 25	Cal Poly*	No. 4	Sunken Diamond • Stanford, CA	W 11–3	Wodnicki (3–0)	Smith (5–3)	None	1,484	32–10	—
Apr 28	California	No. 4	Sunken Diamond • Stanford, CA	L 5–7	Meyer (3–0)	Bruksch (2–3)	None	2,258	32–11	11–5
Apr 29	California	No. 4	Sunken Diamond • Stanford, CA	W 10–6	Wayne (10–2)	Cash (7–4)	None	3,722	33–11	12–5
Apr 30	California	No. 4	Sunken Diamond • Stanford, CA	W 12–11	McCally (1–0)	Meyer (3–1)	None	3,710	34–11	13–5

May: 8–2
Date	Opponent	Rank	Site/stadium	Score	Win	Loss	Save	Attendance	Overall record	Pac-10 record
May 1	San Francisco*	No. 3	Sunken Diamond • Stanford, CA	W 6–0	Sager (4–1)	Dellamaggior (1–1)	None	1,246	35–11	—
May 5	at Oregon State	No. 3	Goss Stadium at Coleman Field • Corvallis, OR	W 10–6	Bruksch (3–3)	Johnson (5–4)	None	463	36–11	14–5
May 6	at Oregon State	No. 3	Goss Stadium at Coleman Field • Corvallis, OR	L 2–5	Nicholson (7–6)	Wayne (10–3)	None	1,311	36–12	14–6
May 7	at Oregon State	No. 3	Goss Stadium at Coleman Field • Corvallis, OR	W 7–5	Bruksch (4–3)	Newell (6–5)	McCally (1)	1,047	37–12	15–6
May 9	at Santa Clara*	No. 2	Buck Shaw Stadium • Santa Clara, CA	W 16–4	Luker (3–0)	Detrick (0–3)	None	413	38–12	—
May 10	Saint Mary's*	No. 2	Sunken Diamond • Stanford, CA	W 7–0	Young (7–0)	LaRochette (2–4)	None	1,371	39–12	—
May 15	at San Francisco*	No. 2	Max Ulrich Field • San Francisco, CA	W 12–6	Wayne (11–3)	Perio (7–6)	Bruksch (10)	686	40–12	—
May 19	No. 22 UCLA	No. 2	Sunken Diamond • Stanford, CA	L 9–10	Brandt (7–5)	Bruksch (4–4)	None	4,020	40–13	15–7
May 20	No. 22 UCLA	No. 2	Sunken Diamond • Stanford, CA	W 19–3	Wayne (12–3)	Henkel (6–3)	None	2,537	41–13	16–7
May 21	No. 22 UCLA	No. 2	Sunken Diamond • Stanford, CA	W 17–11	Cunningham (5–1)	Roe (6–5)	None	2,601	42–13	17–7

Postseason: 8–3

NCAA Palo Alto Regional: 3–1
Date	Opponent	Rank	Site/stadium	Score	Win	Loss	Save	Attendance	Overall record	NCAAT record
May 26	(4) Fresno State	(1) No. 2	Sunken Diamond • Stanford, CA	W 5–1	Young (8–0)	Hannah (7–4)	None	2,827	43–13	1–0
May 27	(2) No. 21 Alabama	(1) No. 2	Sunken Diamond • Stanford, CA	W 8–6	Wayne (13–3)	Heath (4–2)	None	2,508	44–13	2–0
May 28	(2) No. 21 Alabama	(1) No. 2	Sunken Diamond • Stanford, CA	L 9–14	Gingrich (4–1)	Cunningham (5–2)	Murphy (2)	2,610	44–14	2–1
May 28	(2) No. 21 Alabama	(1) No. 2	Sunken Diamond • Stanford, CA	W 16–6	Sager (5–1)	Vaughn (7–3)	Bruksch (11)	1,099	45–14	3–1

NCAA Palo Alto Super Regional: 2–1
Date	Opponent	Rank	Site/stadium	Score	Win	Loss	Save	Attendance	Overall record	NCAAT record
June 2	No. 9 Nebraska	(8) No. 3	Sunken Diamond • Stanford, CA	L 3–7	Spiehs (8–2)	Young (8–1)	None	3,660	45–15	3–2
June 3	No. 9 Nebraska	(8) No. 3	Sunken Diamond • Stanford, CA	W 7–1	Wayne (14–3)	Komine (11–4)	None	2,934	46–15	4–2
June 4	No. 9 Nebraska	(8) No. 3	Sunken Diamond • Stanford, CA	W 5–3	Sager (6–1)	Rodrigue (9–4)	Bruksch (12)	3,682	47–15	5–2

College World Series: 3–1
Date	Opponent	Rank	Site/stadium	Score	Win	Loss	Save	Overall record	CWS record
June 9	vs. No. 8 Louisiana–Lafayette	(8) No. 1	Johnny Rosenblatt Stadium • Omaha, NE	W 6–4	Young (9–1)	Gabriel (9–4)	Bruksch (13)	48–15	1–0
June 11	vs. (4) No. 3 Clemson	(8) No. 1	Johnny Rosenblatt Stadium • Omaha, NE	W 10–4	Wayne (15–3)	Lynn (5–2)	None	49–15	2–0
June 15	vs. No. 8 Louisiana–Lafayette	(8) No. 1	Johnny Rosenblatt Stadium • Omaha, NE	W 19–9	Wodnicki (4–0)	Gros (5–3)	None	50–15	3–0
June 16	vs. (2) No. 2 LSU	(8) No. 1	Johnny Rosenblatt Stadium • Omaha, NE	L 5–6	Hodges (5–2)	Wayne (15–4)	None	50–16	3–1
