= 2000 Clemson Tigers baseball team =

American college baseball season

2000 Clemson Tigers baseball

Clemson Regional champions Clemson Super Regional champions

College World Series, 1–2
- Conference: Atlantic Coast Conference

Ranking
- Coaches: No. 5
- CB: No. 6
- Record: 51–18 (17–7 ACC)
- Head coach: Jack Leggett
- Home stadium: Beautiful Tiger Field

2000 Atlantic Coast Conference baseball standings
	Conf.				Overall
Team	W		L	PCT	W		L	PCT
No. 10 Georgia Tech ‍†‍‡‍^{y}	18	–	6	.750	50	–	16	.758
No. 6 Clemson ‍‍‍^{y}	17	–	7	.708	51	–	18	.739
No. 3 Florida State ‍‍‍^{y}	15	–	9	.625	53	–	19	.736
No. 20 Wake Forest ‍‍‍^{y}	14	–	10	.583	41	–	20	.672
No. 21 North Carolina ‍‍‍^{y}	12	–	12	.500	46	–	17	.730
NC State ‍‍‍	10	–	14	.417	30	–	28	.517
Virginia ‍‍‍	10	–	14	.417	26	–	31	.456
Maryland ‍‍‍	5	–	17	.227	24	–	33	.421
Duke ‍‍‍	5	–	19	.208	17	–	41	.293
† – Conference champion ‡ – Tournament champion y – Invited to the NCAA tournament As of June 30, 2000; Rankings from Collegiate Baseball

The 2000 Clemson Tigers baseball team represented Clemson University in the 2000 NCAA Division I baseball season. The team played their home games at Beautiful Tiger Field in Clemson, South Carolina.

The team was coached by Jack Leggett, who completed his seventh season at Clemson. The Tigers reached the 2000 College World Series, their ninth appearance in Omaha.

== Roster ==
2000 Clemson Tigers roster
- Brian Holstad; - Ryan Hub; - Michael Johnson; - Bradley LeCroy; - Mike Proto; - Steve Pyzik; - Steve Reba; - Jon Smith; - Henri Stanley	Pitchers: - Matt Additon; - Chad Bendinelli; - Scott Berney - Senior; - Thomas Boozer; - Ryan Childs; - Brandt Cook; - Nick Glaser; - Paul Harrelson; - B. J. LaMura; - Kevin Lynn; - Ryan Mottl - Senior; - Mike Rhue; - Jarrod Schmidt - Freshman	Catchers: - Brian Ellis - Senior; Infielders: - Jeff Baker - Freshman; - Mike Calitri - Junior; - Khalil Greene - Sophomore; - Ryan Riley - Junior	Outfielders: - Patrick Boyd - Junior; - Justin Singleton - Junior; - Casey Stone - Junior

== Schedule ==
Legend
	Clemson win
	Clemson loss
**Bold**	Clemson team member
*	Non-Conference game

2000 Clemson Tigers baseball game log: 51–18
Regular season: 42–14

January: 2–1
Date	Opponent	Rank	Site/stadium	Score	Overall record	ACC record
Jan 28	vs. No. 7 Rice*	No. 11	Cracker Jack Stadium • Lake Buena Vista, FL (ACC Disney Blast)	**W** 3–1	1–0	—
Jan 29	vs. No. 5 Miami (FL)*	No. 11	Cracker Jack Stadium • Lake Buena Vista, FL (ACC Disney Blast)	**W** 4–0	2–0	—
Jan 30	vs. UCF*	No. 11	Cracker Jack Stadium • Lake Buena Vista, FL (ACC Disney Blast)	**L** 0–5	2–1	—

February: 6–0
Date	Opponent	Rank	Site/stadium	Score	Overall record	ACC record
Feb 18	Old Dominion*	No. 11	Beautiful Tiger Field • Clemson, SC	**W** 5–0	3–1	—
Feb 19	Old Dominion*	No. 11	Beautiful Tiger Field • Clemson, SC	**W** 3–1	4–1	—
Feb 20	Old Dominion*	No. 11	Beautiful Tiger Field • Clemson, SC	**W** 10–2	5–1	—
Feb 25	James Madison*	No. 9	Beautiful Tiger Field • Clemson, SC	**W** 5–1	6–1	—
Feb 26	James Madison*	No. 9	Beautiful Tiger Field • Clemson, SC	**W** 12–4	7–1	—
Feb 27	James Madison*	No. 9	Beautiful Tiger Field • Clemson, SC	**W** 5–3	8–1	—

March: 15–4
Date	Opponent	Rank	Site/stadium	Score	Overall record	ACC record
Mar 1	Coastal Carolina*	No. 8	Beautiful Tiger Field • Clemson, SC	**W** 4–3	9–1	—
Mar 3	UNLV*	No. 8	Beautiful Tiger Field • Clemson, SC	**W** 8–0	10–1	—
Mar 4	UNLV*	No. 8	Beautiful Tiger Field • Clemson, SC	**W** 5–3	11–1	—
Mar 5	UNLV*	No. 8	Beautiful Tiger Field • Clemson, SC	**L** 3–4	11–2	—
Mar 8	William & Mary*	No. 8	Beautiful Tiger Field • Clemson, SC	**W** 10–6	12–2	—
Mar 10	Ohio*	No. 8	Beautiful Tiger Field • Clemson, SC	**W** 9–4	13–2	—
Mar 10	Ohio*	No. 8	Beautiful Tiger Field • Clemson, SC	**W** 6–1	14–2	—
Mar 11	Ohio*	No. 8	Beautiful Tiger Field • Clemson, SC	**W** 16–2	15–2	—
Mar 14	No. 17 East Carolina*	No. 4	Beautiful Tiger Field • Clemson, SC	**W** 7–0	16–2	—
Mar 15	No. 17 East Carolina*	No. 4	Beautiful Tiger Field • Clemson, SC	**L** 4–12	16–3	—
Mar 17	Maryland	No. 4	Beautiful Tiger Field • Clemson, SC	**W** 8–6	17–3	1–0
Mar 18	Maryland	No. 4	Beautiful Tiger Field • Clemson, SC	**W** 9–3	18–3	2–0
Mar 18	Maryland	No. 4	Beautiful Tiger Field • Clemson, SC	**W** 11–2	19–3	3–0
Mar 22	Charlotte*	No. 1	Beautiful Tiger Field • Clemson, SC	**W** 14–2	20–3	—
Mar 24	The Citadel*	No. 1	Beautiful Tiger Field • Clemson, SC	**W** 9–3	21–3	—
Mar 25	The Citadel*	No. 1	Beautiful Tiger Field • Clemson, SC	**W** 7–5	22–3	—
Mar 26	The Citadel*	No. 1	Beautiful Tiger Field • Clemson, SC	**W** 6–3	23–3	—
Mar 29	at Georgia*	No. 1	Foley Field • Athens, GA	**L** 6–10	23–4	—
Mar 31	at No. 13 North Carolina	No. 1	Boshamer Stadium • Chapel Hill, NC	**L** 0–6	23–5	3–1

April: 14–7
Date	Opponent	Rank	Site/stadium	Score	Overall record	ACC record
Apr 1	at No. 13 North Carolina	No. 1	Boshamer Stadium • Chapel Hill, NC	**W** 10–2	24–5	4–1
Apr 2	at No. 13 North Carolina	No. 1	Boshamer Stadium • Chapel Hill, NC	**L** 2–5	24–6	4–2
Apr 4	Western Carolina*	No. 8	Beautiful Tiger Field • Clemson, SC	**W** 11–7	25–6	—
Apr 5	Furman*	No. 8	Beautiful Tiger Field • Clemson, SC	**W** 3–2	26–6	—
Apr 7	NC State	No. 8	Beautiful Tiger Field • Clemson, SC	**L** 1–5	26–7	4–3
Apr 8	NC State	No. 8	Beautiful Tiger Field • Clemson, SC	**W** 9–0	27–7	5–3
Apr 9	NC State	No. 8	Beautiful Tiger Field • Clemson, SC	**W** 8–4	28–7	6–3
Apr 11	Georgia*	No. 6	Beautiful Tiger Field • Clemson, SC	**W** 9–7	29–7	—
Apr 12	No. 2 South Carolina*	No. 6	Beautiful Tiger Field • Clemson, SC	**L** 3–6	29–8	—
Apr 15	Wake Forest	No. 6	Beautiful Tiger Field • Clemson, SC	**W** 6–5^{15}	30–8	7–3
Apr 15	Wake Forest	No. 6	Beautiful Tiger Field • Clemson, SC	**W** 5–4	31–8	8–3
Apr 16	Wake Forest	No. 6	Beautiful Tiger Field • Clemson, SC	**L** 4–6	31–9	8–4
Apr 18	Elon*	No. 7	Beautiful Tiger Field • Clemson, SC	**W** 17–5	32–9	—
Apr 19	at No. 1 South Carolina*	No. 7	Sarge Frye Field • Columbia, SC	**L** 8–9^{12}	32–10	—
Apr 21	at Duke	No. 7	Jack Coombs Field • Durham, NC	**W** 8–5	33–10	9–4
Apr 22	at Duke	No. 7	Jack Coombs Field • Durham, NC	**W** 8–5	34–10	10–4
Apr 23	at Duke	No. 7	Jack Coombs Field • Durham, NC	**W** 12–8	35–10	11–4
Apr 26	vs. Western Carolina*	No. 7	McCormick Field • Asheville, NC	**W** 13–4	36–10	—
Apr 28	at No. 5 Georgia Tech	No. 7	Russ Chandler Stadium • Atlanta, GA	**L** 4–7	36–11	11–5
Apr 29	at No. 5 Georgia Tech	No. 7	Russ Chandler Stadium • Atlanta, GA	**L** 7–9	36–12	11–6
Apr 30	at No. 5 Georgia Tech	No. 7	Russ Chandler Stadium • Atlanta, GA	**W** 13–12	37–12	12–6

May: 5–2
Date	Opponent	Rank	Site/stadium	Score	Overall record	ACC record
May 6	No. 2 Florida State	No. 9	Beautiful Tiger Field • Clemson, SC	**W** 8–7	38–12	13–6
May 7	No. 2 Florida State	No. 9	Beautiful Tiger Field • Clemson, SC	**W** 5–4	39–12	14–6
May 8	No. 2 Florida State	No. 9	Beautiful Tiger Field • Clemson, SC	**W** 7–4	40–12	15–6
May 11	at Liberty*	No. 8	Al Worthington Stadium • Lynchburg, VA	**L** 4–6	40–13	—
May 13	at Virginia	No. 8	UVA Baseball Field • Charlottesville, VA	**W** 9–7	41–13	16–6
May 13	at Virginia	No. 8	UVA Baseball Field • Charlottesville, VA	**L** 0–11	41–14	16–7
May 14	at Virginia	No. 8	UVA Baseball Field • Charlottesville, VA	**W** 20–9	42–14	17–7

Postseason: 9–4

ACC Tournament: 3–2
Date	Opponent	Rank	Site/stadium	Score	Overall record	ACCT Record
May 17	vs. (7) Virginia	(2) No. 6	Knights Stadium • Fort Mill, SC	**W** 9–5	43–14	1–0
May 18	vs. (3) No. 8 Florida State	(2) No. 6	Knights Stadium • Fort Mill, SC	**W** 8–4	44–14	2–0
May 19	vs. (1) No. 3 Georgia Tech	(2) No. 6	Knights Stadium • Fort Mill, SC	**L** 8–9	44–15	2–1
May 20	vs. (7) Virginia	(2) No. 6	Knights Stadium • Fort Mill, SC	**W** 12–5	45–15	3–1
May 20	vs. (1) No. 3 Georgia Tech	(2) No. 6	Knights Stadium • Fort Mill, SC	**L** 4–8	45–16	3–2

NCAA Clemson Regional: 3–0
Date	Opponent	Rank	Site/stadium	Score	Overall record	NCAAT record
May 26	(4) Middle Tennessee	No. 8 (1)	Doug Kingsmore Stadium • Clemson, SC	**W** 4–0	46–16	1–0
May 27	(3) Illinois	No. 8 (1)	Beautiful Tiger Field • Clemson, SC	**W** 9–3	47–16	2–0
May 28	(4) Middle Tennessee State	No. 8 (1)	Beautiful Tiger Field • Clemson, SC	**W** 21–3	48–16	3–0

NCAA Clemson Super Regional: 2–0
Date	Opponent	Rank	Site/stadium	Score	Overall record	NCAAT record
June 2	No. 10 Mississippi State	(4) No. 5	Beautiful Tiger Field • Clemson, SC	**W** 11–4	49–16	4–0
June 3	No. 10 Mississippi State	(4) No. 5	Beautiful Tiger Field • Clemson, SC	**W** 9–4	50–16	5–0

NCAA College World Series: 1–2
Date	Opponent	Rank	Site/stadium	Score	Overall record	CWS record
June 9	vs. No. 7 San Jose State	(4) No. 3	Johnny Rosenblatt Stadium • Omaha, NE	**W** 10–6	51–16	1–0
June 11	vs. (8) No. 1 Stanford	(4) No. 3	Johnny Rosenblatt Stadium • Omaha, NE	**L** 4–10	51–17	1–1
June 14	vs. No. 8 Louisiana–Lafayette	(4) No. 3	Johnny Rosenblatt Stadium • Omaha, NE	**L** 4–5	51–18	1–2

== Ranking movements ==
Ranking movements Legend: ██ Increase in ranking ██ Decrease in ranking
	Week																		
Poll	Pre	1	2	3	4	5	6	7	8	9	10	11	12	13	14	15	16	17	Final
Coaches'		*																	5
Baseball America																			7
Collegiate Baseball^	11	11	9	8	8	4	1	1	8	6	7	7	9	8	6	8	5	3	6
NCBWA†																			

^ Collegiate Baseball ranked 40 teams in their preseason poll, but only ranked 30 teams weekly during the season.
† NCBWA ranks 30 teams in their preseason poll, but only ranks 25 teams weekly during the season.
* A new poll was not released for this week, so for comparison purposes, the previous week's ranking is inserted in this week's slot.
