= 2000 ACC Tournament (disambiguation) =

2000 ACC tournament popularly refers to the ACC men's basketball tournament.

2000 ACC tournament may also refer to:

- 2000 ACC women's basketball tournament
- 2000 ACC men's soccer tournament
- 2000 ACC women's soccer tournament
- 2000 Atlantic Coast Conference baseball tournament
- 2000 Atlantic Coast Conference softball tournament
