= Piraro =

Piraro is a surname. Notable people with the surname include:

- Dan Piraro (born 1958), American painter, illustrator, and cartoonist
- Sam Piraro (born 1951), American baseball coach
