= 2000 Texas Longhorns baseball team =

American college baseball season

2000 Texas Longhorns baseball

NCAA Tempe Regional champions NCAA Austin Super Regional champions

College World Series, 0–2
- Conference: Big 12 Conference

Ranking
- Coaches: No. 7
- CB: No. 7
- Record: 46–21 (19–10 Big 12)
- Head coach: Augie Garrido (4th year)
- Home stadium: Disch–Falk Field

2000 Big 12 Conference baseball standings
	Conf.				Overall
Team	W		L	PCT	W		L	PCT
No. 18 Baylor ‍†‍‍^{y}	23	–	7	.767	45	–	17	.726
No. 11 Nebraska ‍‍‡‍^{y}	21	–	9	.700	51	–	17	.750
Oklahoma ‍‍‍^{y}	20	–	10	.667	41	–	23	.641
No. 7 Texas ‍‍‍^{y}	19	–	10	.655	46	–	21	.687
Texas Tech ‍‍‍^{y}	18	–	12	.600	36	–	26	.581
Oklahoma State ‍‍‍	14	–	13	.519	36	–	22	.621
Missouri ‍‍‍	13	–	14	.481	33	–	24	.579
Texas A&M ‍‍‍	11	–	19	.367	23	–	35	.397
Kansas ‍‍‍	10	–	20	.333	25	–	30	.455
Iowa State ‍‍‍	7	–	23	.233	19	–	37	.339
Kansas State ‍‍‍	5	–	24	.172	19	–	32	.373
† – Conference champion ‡ – Tournament champion y – Invited to the NCAA tournament As of June 30, 2000; Rankings from Collegiate Baseball

The 2000 Texas Longhorns baseball team represented the University of Texas at Austin in the 2000 NCAA Division I baseball season. The Longhorns played their home games at Disch–Falk Field. The team was coached by Augie Garrido in his 4th season at Texas.

The Longhorns reached the College World Series, where they were eliminated in two games by eventual champion LSU and Florida State.

== Personnel ==
=== Roster ===
2000 Texas Longhorns roster
Pitchers: 17 - Beau Hale; 19 - D. J. Jones; 32 - Phil Seibel; 33 - Charlie Thames; Catchers: 39 - Ryan Hubele	Infielders: 1 - Tommy Nicholson; 2 - Todd West; 40 - Jeff Ontiveros; Outfielders: 4 - Ben Emond	Unknown: 5 - Ryan France; 7 - Sam Anderson; 8 - Matt Rosenberg; 10 - Ray Clark; 11 - Chris Houser; 12 - Mike Pumo; 13 - Ryan Brooks; 15 - Todd Clark; 24 - Eric Tomlinson; 31 - Chris Carmichael; 34 - Kevin Frizzell; 45 - Dylan Freytag

=== Coaches ===
2000 Texas Longhorns baseball coaching staff
- Augie Garrido – Head coach – 4th year
- Tommy Harmon – Assistant coach – 11th year
- Frank Anderson – Assistant coach – 1st year
- Rob Penders – Volunteer assistant coach – 2nd year

== Schedule and results ==
Legend
Texas win
Texas loss
Tie
Rankings from Collegiate Baseball, (Tournament seeds in parentheses)

2000 Texas Longhorns baseball game log: 46–21
Regular season: 39–16

February: 14–3
Date	Opponent	Rank	Site/stadium	Score	Overall record	Big 12 Record
Feb 1	Texas–Arlington*	No. 12	Disch–Falk Field • Austin, TX	L 1–3	0–1	—
Feb 2	Texas–Arlington*	No. 12	Disch–Falk Field • Austin, TX	W 7–0	1–1	—
Feb 4	No. 10 Houston*	No. 12	Disch–Falk Field • Austin, TX	W 2–1^{11}	2–1	—
Feb 5	No. 10 Houston*	No. 12	Disch–Falk Field • Austin, TX	L 2–8	2–2	—
Feb 6	No. 10 Houston*	No. 12	Disch–Falk Field • Austin, TX	W 7–1	3–2	—
Feb 8	Dallas Baptist*	No. 12	Disch–Falk Field • Austin, TX	W 6–0	4–2	—
Feb 11	Sam Houston State*	No. 12	Disch–Falk Field • Austin, TX	W 10–0 (Note: Beau Hale threw a no-hitter.)	5–2	—
Feb 12	Sam Houston State*	No. 12	Disch–Falk Field • Austin, TX	W 7–3	6–2	—
Feb 13	Sam Houston State*	No. 12	Disch–Falk Field • Austin, TX	W 13–4	7–2	—
Feb 15	UTSA*	No. 8	Disch–Falk Field • Austin, TX	W 5–4	8–2	—
Feb 18	at No. 3 Stanford*	No. 8	Sunken Diamond • Stanford, CA	L 2–8	8–3	—
Feb 19	at No. 3 Stanford*	No. 8	Sunken Diamond • Stanford, CA	W 3–2	9–3	—
Feb 23	Southwest Texas State*	No. 5	Disch–Falk Field • Austin, TX	W 4–3	10–3	—
Feb 25	Iowa State	No. 5	Disch–Falk Field • Austin, TX	W 7–1	11–3	1–0
Feb 26	Iowa State	No. 5	Disch–Falk Field • Austin, TX	W 13–5	12–3	2–0
Feb 27	Iowa State	No. 5	Disch–Falk Field • Austin, TX	W 4–0	13–3	3–0
Feb 29	at No. 5 Houston*	No. 4	Schroeder Park • Houston, TX	W 8–7	14–3	—

March: 14–2
Date	Opponent	Rank	Site/stadium	Score	Overall record	Big 12 Record
Mar 4	at Missouri	No. 4	Simmons Field • Columbia, MO	W 6–4	15–3	4–0
Mar 4	at Missouri	No. 4	Simmons Field • Columbia, MO	W 9–6	16–3	5–0
Mar 5	at Missouri	No. 4	Simmons Field • Columbia, MO	L 3–5	16–4	5–1
Mar 7	TCU*	No. 4	Disch–Falk Field • Austin, TX	W 17–15	17–4	—
Mar 10	Kansas	No. 4	Disch–Falk Field • Austin, TX	L 7–8	17–5	5–2
Mar 11	Kansas	No. 4	Disch–Falk Field • Austin, TX	W 6–3	18–5	6–2
Mar 12	Kansas	No. 4	Disch–Falk Field • Austin, TX	W 5–3	19–5	7–2
Mar 14	No. 30 Oral Roberts*	No. 6	Disch–Falk Field • Austin, TX	W 4–2	20–5	—
Mar 17	at Kansas State	No. 6	KSU Baseball Stadium • Manhattan, KS	W 14–2	21–5	8–2
Mar 19	at Kansas State	No. 6	KSU Baseball Stadium • Manhattan, KS	W 15–3	22–5	9–2
Mar 21	Texas–Pan American*	No. 5	Disch–Falk Field • Austin, TX	W 12–4	23–5	—
Mar 24	Oklahoma State	No. 5	Disch–Falk Field • Austin, TX	W 8–4	24–5	10–2
Mar 25	Oklahoma State	No. 5	Disch–Falk Field • Austin, TX	W 6–1	25–5	11–2
Mar 26	Oklahome State	No. 5	Disch–Falk Field • Austin, TX	W 16–14	26–5	12–2
Mar 28	Southwest Texas State*	No. 3	Disch–Falk Field • Austin, TX	W 18–1	27–5	—
Mar 31	at Oklahoma	No. 3	L. Dale Mitchell Baseball Park • Norman, OK	W 6–5^{11}	28–5	13–2

April: 9–7
Date	Opponent	Rank	Site/stadium	Score	Overall record	Big 12 Record
Apr 2	at Oklahoma	No. 3	L. Dale Mitchell Baseball Park • Norman, OK	W 18–5	29–5	14–2
Apr 2	at Oklahoma	No. 3	L. Dale Mitchell Baseball Park • Norman, OK	L 7–11	29–6	14–3
Apr 4	McNeese State*	No. 2	Disch–Falk Field • Austin, TX	W 4–2	30–6	—
Apr 7	California*	No. 2	Disch–Falk Field • Austin, TX	W 9–6	31–6	—
Apr 8	California*	No. 2	Disch–Falk Field • Austin, TX	W 6–0	32–6	—
Apr 9	California*	No. 2	Disch–Falk Field • Austin, TX	L 2–10	32–7	—
Apr 14	at Texas Tech	No. 3	Dan Law Field • Lubbock, TX	W 3–1	33–7	15–3
Apr 15	at Texas Tech	No. 3	Dan Law Field • Lubbock, TX	L 9–11	33–8	15–4
Apr 16	at Texas Tech	No. 3	Dan Law Field • Lubbock, TX	L 9–11	33–9	15–5
Apr 21	at No. 9 Baylor	No. 5	Baylor Ballpark • Waco, TX	L 5–6	33–10	15–6
Apr 22	at No. 9 Baylor	No. 5	Baylor Ballpark • Waco, TX	W 7–4	34–10	16–6
Apr 23	at No. 9 Baylor	No. 5	Baylor Ballpark • Waco, TX	L 8–11	34–11	16–7
Apr 25	at UTSA*	No. 8	Roadrunner Field • San Antonio, TX	W 8–4	35–11	—
Apr 28	Texas A&M	No. 8	Disch–Falk Field • Austin, TX	W 3–1	36–11	17–7
Apr 29	at Texas A&M	No. 8	Olsen Field • College Station, TX	W 7–2	37–11	18–7
Apr 30	at Texas A&M	No. 8	Olsen Field • College Station, TX	L 2–4	37–12	18–8

May: 2–4
Date	Opponent	Rank	Site/stadium	Score	Overall record	Big 12 Record
May 2	Southwest Texas State*	No. 8	Disch–Falk Field • Austin, TX	L 0–5	37–13	—
May 6	No. 13 Nebraska	No. 8	Disch–Falk Field • Austin, TX	L 0–4	37–14	18–9
May 7	No. 13 Nebraska	No. 8	Disch–Falk Field • Austin, TX	W 8–6	38–14	19–9
May 8	No. 13 Nebraska	No. 9	Disch–Falk Field • Austin, TX	L 0–2	38–15	19–10
May 13	Sam Houston State*	No. 9	Disch–Falk Field • Austin, TX	W 3–0	39–15	—
May 14	Sam Houston State*	No. 9	Disch–Falk Field • Austin, TX	L 1–3	39–16	—

Postseason: 7–5

Big 12 Tournament: 1–2
Date	Opponent	Rank	Site/stadium	Score	Overall record	B12T Record
May 17	(5) Texas Tech	(4) No. 13	SBC Bricktown Ballpark • Oklahoma City, OK	W 8–4	40–16	1–0
May 18	(1) No. 5 Baylor	(4) No. 13	SBC Bricktown Ballpark • Oklahoma City, OK	L 2–3	40–17	1–1
May 19	(5) Texas Tech	(4) No. 13	SBC Bricktown Ballpark • Oklahoma City, OK	L 3–4	40–18	1–2

NCAA Tempe Regional: 4–1
Date	Opponent	Rank	Site/stadium	Score	Overall record	NCAAT record
May 26	(3) Creighton	(2) No. 13	Packard Stadium • Tempe, AZ	W 5–4	41–18	1–0
May 27	(1) No. 4 Arizona State	(2) No. 13	Packard Stadium • Tempe, AZ	L 1–3	41–19	1–1
May 27	(4) Miami (OH)	(2) No. 13	Packard Stadium • Tempe, AZ	W 11–1	42–19	2–1
May 28	(1) No. 4 Arizona State	(2) No. 13	Packard Stadium • Tempe, AZ	W 6–4	43–19	3–1
May 28	(1) No. 4 Arizona State	(2) No. 13	Packard Stadium • Tempe, AZ	W 9–7	44–19	4–1

NCAA Austin Super Regional: 2–0
Date	Opponent	Rank	Site/stadium	Score	Overall record	NCAAT record
June 2	No. 18 Penn State	No. 11	Disch–Falk Field • Austin, TX	W 7–3	45–19	5–1
June 3	No. 18 Penn State	No. 11	Disch–Falk Field • Austin, TX	W 10–0	46–19	6–1

College World Series: 0–2
Date	Opponent	Seed	Site/stadium	Score	Overall record	CWS record
June 10	(2) No. 2 LSU	No. 6	Johnny Rosenblatt Stadium • Omaha, NE	L 5–13	46–20	0–1
June 12	(6) No. 4 Florida State	No. 6	Johnny Rosenblatt Stadium • Omaha, NE	L 2–6	46–21	0–2
