= 2000 USC Trojans baseball team =

American college baseball season

2000 USC Trojans baseball

Fullerton Regional champions Atlanta Super Regional champions

College World Series, T-5th
- Conference: Pacific-10

Ranking
- Coaches: No. 4
- CB: No. 5
- Record: 44–20 (16–8 Pac-10)
- Head coach: Mike Gillespie (14th season)
- Assistant coach: Rob Klein (13th season)
- Hitting coach: Andy Nieto (4th season)
- Pitching coach: John Savage (5th season)
- Home stadium: Dedeaux Field

2000 Pacific-10 Conference baseball standings
	Conf.				Overall
Team	W		L	PCT	W		L	PCT
No. 2 Stanford ‍†‍‍^{y}	17	–	7	.708	50	–	16	.758
No. 12 Arizona State ‍†‍‍^{y}	17	–	7	.708	44	–	15	.746
No. 16 UCLA ‍†‍‍^{y}	17	–	7	.708	38	–	26	.594
No. 5 Southern California ‍‍‍^{y}	16	–	8	.667	44	–	20	.688
California ‍‍‍	11	–	13	.458	25	–	28	.472
Oregon State ‍‍‍	9	–	15	.375	28	–	27	.509
Arizona ‍‍‍	8	–	16	.333	26	–	30	.464
Washington ‍‍‍	7	–	17	.292	26	–	30	.464
Washington State ‍‍‍	6	–	18	.250	20	–	36	.357
† – Conference champion y – Invited to the NCAA tournament As of June 19, 2000; Rankings from Collegiate Baseball

The 2000 USC Trojans baseball team represented the University of Southern California in the 2000 NCAA Division I baseball season. The Trojans played their home games at Dedeaux Field. The team was coached by Mike Gillespie in his 14th year at USC.

The Trojans won the Fullerton Regional and the East Regional to advance to the College World Series, where they were defeated by the Florida State Seminoles.

== Roster ==
2000 USC Trojans baseball team
Players
Coaches

#	Pos.	Name	B/T	Height	Weight	Year	Home town
2	INF	Seth Davidson	S/R	6 ft 0 in (1.83 m)	165 lb (75 kg)	Jr	San Diego, California
3	RHP	Brian Bannister	R/R	6 ft 0 in (1.83 m)	180 lb (82 kg)	Fr	Paradise Valley, Arizona
4	LHP	Ron Flores	L/L	5 ft 11 in (1.8 m)	190 lb (86 kg)	Jr	Pico Rivera, California
5	INF	Cesar Gomez	R/R	5 ft 6 in (1.68 m)	165 lb (75 kg)	RS Jr	Monterey Park, California
6	OF	Brian Barre	L/L	5 ft 8 in (1.73 m)	170 lb (77 kg)	So	Garden Grove, California
7	RHP	Pete Montrenes	R/R	6 ft 3 in (1.91 m)	190 lb (86 kg)	So	Fountain Valley, California
8	RHP	Rik Currier	R/R	5 ft 10 in (1.78 m)	185 lb (84 kg)	Jr	Dana Point, California
9	C	Beau Craig	S/R	5 ft 11 in (1.8 m)	175 lb (79 kg)	So	Santee, California
10		Josh Self	R/R	6 ft 4 in (1.93 m)	190 lb (86 kg)	RS Jr	Hughson, California
12	RHP	Kevin Correa	R/R	6 ft 0 in (1.83 m)	185 lb (84 kg)	So	Sacramento, California
13		Alberto Concepcion	R/R	6 ft 0 in (1.83 m)	210 lb (95 kg)	Fr	El Segundo, California
14	OF	Eric Verbryke	L/L	6 ft 2 in (1.88 m)	210 lb (95 kg)	Fr	Santa Maria, California
15	OF	Rob Garibaldi	L/L	5 ft 11 in (1.8 m)	175 lb (79 kg)	RS So	Petaluma, California
16		Kevin Miller	L/L	6 ft 2 in (1.88 m)	205 lb (93 kg)	Fr	Long Beach, California
17	C	Ricky Holland	S/R	6 ft 2 in (1.88 m)	215 lb (98 kg)	Jr	Ventura, California
18	LHP	Mark Todd	L/L	5 ft 11 in (1.8 m)	170 lb (77 kg)	So	San Diego, California
21	RHP	Mark Prior	R/R	6 ft 5 in (1.96 m)	220 lb (100 kg)	So	Bonita, California
22		Josh Persell	S/R	6 ft 3 in (1.91 m)	200 lb (91 kg)	RS Jr	Sherman Oaks, California
23	RHP	Anthony Reyes	/R	6 ft 1 in (1.85 m)	200 lb (91 kg)	Fr	Whittier, California
24	INF	Anthony Lunetta	R/R	5 ft 9 in (1.75 m)	170 lb (77 kg)	Fr	Riverside, California
25	RHP	Chad Clark	L/R	6 ft 6 in (1.98 m)	210 lb (95 kg)	Fr	Glendora, California
26	INF	Justin Gemoll	R/R	6 ft 2 in (1.88 m)	215 lb (98 kg)	Sr	San Jose, California
28	RHP	Tanner Eriksen	R/R	6 ft 6 in (1.98 m)	230 lb (104 kg)	RS So	Fresno, California
30	OF	Paki Lum	R/R	6 ft 1 in (1.85 m)	215 lb (98 kg)	Fr	Aiea, Hawaii
31	INF	Francisco Enriquez	R/R	6 ft 1 in (1.85 m)	185 lb (84 kg)	Fr	Arleta, California
32	RHP	Raul Lepe	R/R	6 ft 1 in (1.85 m)	180 lb (82 kg)	RS Sr	San Gabriel, California
33	OF	Aaron Fausett	R/R	6 ft 1 in (1.85 m)	215 lb (98 kg)	So	Beaverton, Oregon
35	RHP	Ryan Port	R/R	5 ft 11 in (1.8 m)	185 lb (84 kg)	RS So	Los Angeles, California
37	RHP	Tim Petke	/R	6 ft 3 in (1.91 m)	210 lb (95 kg)	So	Portland, Oregon
38	INF	Colby Self	R/R	6 ft 1 in (1.85 m)	165 lb (75 kg)	Fr	Hughson, California
39	LHP	Michael Kimball	L/L	6 ft 0 in (1.83 m)	185 lb (84 kg)	RS Fr	Alamo, California
40	RHP	Shaun Kramer	R/R	6 ft 2 in (1.88 m)	180 lb (82 kg)	Jr	Diamond Bar, California
41	OF	Michael Melikian	S/R	5 ft 9 in (1.75 m)	160 lb (73 kg)	Fr	Fresno, California
42	OF	Tony Peres-Alston	L/R	5 ft 9 in (1.75 m)	195 lb (88 kg)	RS So	Oceanside, California
43	OF	Troy Polamalu	R/R	5 ft 10 in (1.78 m)	200 lb (91 kg)	Fr	Roseburg, Oregon
44	OF	Abel Montanez	R/R	6 ft 1 in (1.85 m)	195 lb (88 kg)	RS Jr	Montebello, California
48	C	Jeff Adolph	R/R	6 ft 0 in (1.83 m)	190 lb (86 kg)	RS Fr	Fresno, California
50	INF	Bill Peavey	L/L	6 ft 4 in (1.93 m)	230 lb (104 kg)	RS So	Brisbane, California

Head coach

Mike Gillespie

Assistant coach(es)

Hitting coach(es)

Andy Nieto

Pitching coach(es)

John Savage
Rob Klein

Legend

- (C) Team captain
- (S) Suspended
- (I) Ineligible
- Injured
- Current redshirt

Roster
Last update: September 6, 2020

== Schedule ==
2000 USC Trojans baseball game log: 44–20
Regular season: 38–18
January (2–0)

#	Date	Opponent	Rank	Site/stadium	Score	Overall record	Pac-10 record
1	January 29	at No. 26 Pepperdine	No. 15	Eddy D. Field Stadium • Malibu, California	W 7–3	1–0	—
2	January 30	No. 26 Pepperdine	No. 15	Dedeaux Field • Los Angeles, California	W 8–1	2–0	—

February (8–3)

#	Date	Opponent	Rank	Site/stadium	Score	Overall record	Pac-10 record
3	February 4	No. 22 Long Beach State	No. 15	Dedeaux Field • Los Angeles, California	W 3–2	3–0	—
4	February 5	at No. 22 Long Beach State	No. 15	Blair Field • Long Beach, California	L 3–13	3–1	—
5	February 6	No. 22 Long Beach State	No. 15	Dedeaux Field • Los Angeles, California	W 9–2	4–1	—
6	February 8	at Loyola Marymount	No. 15	George C. Page Stadium • Los Angeles, California	W 9–8	5–1	—
7	February 11	at No. 18 Texas Tech	No. 15	Dan Law Field • Lubbock, Texas	L 3–4	5–2	—
8	February 12	at No. 18 Texas Tech	No. 15	Dan Law Field • Lubbock, Texas	W 9–4	6–2	—
9	February 13	at No. 18 Texas Tech	No. 15	Dan Law Field • Lubbock, Texas	L 7–20	6–3	—
10	February 15	at No. 6 Cal State Fullerton	No. 17	Titan Field • Fullerton, California	W 7–6	7–3	—
11	February 22	San Diego	No. 16	Dedeaux Field • Los Angeles, California	W 7–3	8–3	—
12	February 25	No. 15 UCLA	No. 16	Dedeaux Field • Los Angeles, California	W 10–7	9–3	—
13	February 26	No. 15 UCLA	No. 16	Dedeaux Field • Los Angeles, California	W 4–3	10–3	—

March (10–7)

#	Date	Opponent	Rank	Site/stadium	Score	Overall record	Pac-10 record
14	March 3	vs. No. 6 Georgia Tech	No. 11	Titan Field • Fullerton, California	W 9–2	11–33	—
15	March 4	vs. No. 23 Mississippi State	No. 11	Titan Field • Fullerton, California	W 7–1	12–3	—
16	March 7	UC Santa Barbara	No. 5	Dedeaux Field • Los Angeles, California	W 6–5	13–3	—
17	March 10	at No. 17 Houston	No. 5	Schroeder Park • Houston, Texas	L 2–3	13–4	—
18	March 11	at No. 17 Houston	No. 5	Schroeder Park • Houston, Texas	L 7–14	13–5	—
19	March 12	at No. 17 Houston	No. 5	Schroeder Park • Houston, Texas	L 4–8	13–6	—
20	March 14	at San Diego	No. 12	John Cunningham Stadium • San Diego, California	L 4–10	13–7	—
21	March 14	at San Diego	No. 12	John Cunningham Stadium • San Diego, California	W 5–3	14–7	—
22	March 17	at No. 3 Stanford	No. 12	Sunken Diamond • Stanford, California	L 3–4	14–8	—
23	March 18	at No. 3 Stanford	No. 12	Sunken Diamond • Stanford, California	W 11–7	15–8	—
24	March 19	at No. 3 Stanford	No. 12	Sunken Diamond • Stanford, California	L 4–11	15–9	—
25	March 21	Loyola Marymount	No. 13	Dedeaux Field • Los Angeles, California	W 7–3	16–9	—
26	March 24	Washington State	No. 13	Dedeaux Field • Los Angeles, California	W 7–6	17–9	1–0
27	March 25	Washington State	No. 13	Dedeaux Field • Los Angeles, California	W 12–7	18–9	2–0
28	March 26	Washington State	No. 13	Dedeaux Field • Los Angeles, California	W 10–1	19–9	3–0
29	March 28	at San Diego State	No. 10	Tony Gwynn Stadium • San Diego, California	W 11–4	20–9	—
30	March 31	at Arizona	No. 10	Jerry Kindall Field at Frank Sancet Stadium • Tucson, Arizona	L 4–11	20–10	3–1

April (10–8)

#	Date	Opponent	Rank	Site/stadium	Score	Overall record	Pac-10 record
31	April 1	at Arizona	No. 10	Jerry Kindall Field at Frank Sancet Stadium • Tucson, Arizona	W 20–9	21–10	4–1
32	April 2	at Arizona	No. 10	Jerry Kindall Field at Frank Sancet Stadium • Tucson, Arizona	W 6–2	22–10	5–1
33	April 5	No. 11 Cal State Fullerton	No. 10	Dedeaux Field • Los Angeles, California	L 4–5	22–11	—
34	April 7	at No. 25 UCLA	No. 10	Jackie Robinson Stadium • Los Angeles, California	W 5–1	23–11	6–1
35	April 8	at No. 25 UCLA	No. 10	Jackie Robinson Stadium • Los Angeles, California	L 5–15	23–12	6–2
36	April 9	at No. 25 UCLA	No. 10	Jackie Robinson Stadium • Los Angeles, California	L 5–8	23–13	6–3
37	April 11	San Diego State	No. 16	Dedeaux Field • Los Angeles, California	W 6–4	24–13	—
38	April 14	at California	No. 16	Evans Diamond • Berkeley, California	W 6–5	25–13	7–3
39	April 15	at California	No. 16	Evans Diamond • Berkeley, California	L 5–9	25–14	7–4
40	April 16	at California	No. 16	Evans Diamond • Berkeley, California	L 3–4	25–15	7–5
41	April 18	No. 19 UCLA	No. 22	Dedeaux Field • Los Angeles, California	W 6–2	26–15	—
42	April 20	No. 4 Stanford	No. 22	Dedeaux Field • Los Angeles, California	W 7–3	27–15	8–5
43	April 21	No. 4 Stanford	No. 22	Dedeaux Field • Los Angeles, California	L 1–4	27–16	8–6
44	April 22	No. 4 Stanford	No. 22	Dedeaux Field • Los Angeles, California	L 4–18	27–17	8–7
45	April 25	at UC Santa Barbara	No. 23	Caesar Uyesaka Stadium • Santa Barbara, California	W 9–3	28–17	—
46	April 28	No. 3 Arizona State	No. 23	Dedeaux Field • Los Angeles, California	L 1–3	28–18	8–8
47	April 29	No. 3 Arizona State	No. 23	Dedeaux Field • Los Angeles, California	W 12–2	29–18	9–8
48	April 30	No. 3 Arizona State	No. 23	Dedeaux Field • Los Angeles, California	W 4–3	30–18	10–8

May (8–0)

#	Date	Opponent	Rank	Site/stadium	Score	Overall record	Pac-10 record
49	May 2	Santa Clara	No. 20	Dedeaux Field • Los Angeles, California	W 6–2	31–18	—
50	May 10	at No. 17 Cal State Fullerton	No. 20	Titan Field • Fullerton, California	W 8–3	32–18	—
51	May 12	Oregon State	No. 20	Dedeaux Field • Los Angeles, California	W 12–1	33–18	11–8
52	May 13	Oregon State	No. 20	Dedeaux Field • Los Angeles, California	W 16–7	34–18	12–8
53	May 14	Oregon State	No. 20	Dedeaux Field • Los Angeles, California	W 16–3	35–18	13–8
54	May 19	at Washington	No. 20	Husky Ballpark • Seattle, Washington	W 6–1	36–18	14–8
55	May 20	at Washington	No. 20	Husky Ballpark • Seattle, Washington	W 13–3	37–18	15–8
56	May 21	at Washington	No. 20	Husky Ballpark • Seattle, Washington	W 4–3	38–18	16–8

Postseason: 6–2
Fullerton Regional (3–0)

#	Date	Opponent	Seed/Rank	Site/stadium	Score	Overall record	NCAAT record
57	May 26	vs. (4) Virginia Tech	(1) No. 16	Titan Field • Fullerton, California	W 8–3	39–18	1–0
58	May 27	vs. (3) No. 20 Loyola Marymount	(1) No. 16	Titan Field • Fullerton, California	W 13–3	40–18	2–0
59	May 28	at (2) No. 17 Cal State Fullerton	(1) No. 16	Titan Field • Fullerton, California	W 8–3	41–18	3–0

Atlanta Super Regional (2–0)

#	Date	Opponent	Seed/Rank	Site/stadium	Score	Overall record	NCAAT record
60	June 2	at (3) No. 1 Georgia Tech	No. 13	Russ Chandler Stadium • Atlanta, Georgia	W 7–2	42–18	4–0
61	June 3	at (3) No. 1 Georgia Tech	No. 13	Russ Chandler Stadium • Atlanta, Georgia	W 6–3	43–18	5–0

College World Series (1–2)

#	Date	Opponent	Seed/Rank	Site/stadium	Score	Overall record	CWS record
62	June 10	vs. (6) No. 4 Florida State	No. 5	Johnny Rosenblatt Stadium • Omaha, Nebraska	W 6–4	44–18	1–0
63	June 12	vs. (2) No. 2 LSU	No. 5	Johnny Rosenblatt Stadium • Omaha, Nebraska	L 4–10	44–19	1–1
64	June 14	vs. (6) No. 4 Florida State	No. 5	Johnny Rosenblatt Stadium • Omaha, Nebraska	L 2–3	44–20	2–1

== Awards and honors ==
Beau Craig

- College World Series All-Tournament Team
- First Team All-Pac-10

Rik Currier

- Second Team All-American Baseball America
- Second Team All-American Collegiate Baseball
- Second Team All-American The Sports Network
- Third Team All-American National Collegiate Baseball Writers Association
- Pac-10 Conference Pitcher of the Year

Seth Davidson

- Honorable Mention All-Pac-10

Rob Garibaldi

- Honorable Mention All-Pac-10

Justin Gemoll

- Second Team All-American Baseball America
- Third Team All-American Collegiate Baseball
- First Team All-Pac-10

Anthony Lunetta

- Second Team Freshman All-American Baseball America
- First Team Freshman All-American Collegiate Baseball
- Pac-10 Conference Newcomer of the Year

Josh Persell

- Honorable Mention All-Pac-10

Mark Prior

- Honorable Mention All-Pac-10

Anthony Reyes

- Second Team Freshman All-American Baseball America
- Honorable Mention All-Pac-10
