= 2000 NCAA Division I baseball rankings =

2000 NCAA Division I baseball season

Tournament
- Duration: May 26–June 17, 2000

College World Series
- Duration: June 9–June 17, 2000
- Champions: LSU (5th title)
- Runners-up: Stanford
- MOP: Trey Hodges

Seasons
- ← 1999 2001 →

The following polls make up the 2000 NCAA Division I baseball rankings. USA Today and ESPN began publishing the Coaches' Poll of 31 active coaches ranking the top 25 teams in the nation in 1992. Each coach is a member of the American Baseball Coaches Association. Baseball America began publishing its poll of the top 20 teams in college baseball in 1981. Beginning with the 1985 season, it expanded to the top 25. Collegiate Baseball Newspaper published its first human poll of the top 20 teams in college baseball in 1957, and expanded to rank the top 30 teams in 1961.

== Legend ==
	Increase in ranking
	Decrease in ranking
	Not ranked previous week
Italics	Number of first place votes
(#-#)	Win–loss record
т	Tied with team above or below also with this symbol

== USA Today/ESPN Coaches' Poll ==
Currently, only the final poll from the 2000 season is available.

Rank	Team
1	LSU
2	Stanford
3	Florida State
4	Southern California
5	Clemson
6	Louisiana–Lafayette
7	Texas
8	South Carolina
9	San Jose State
10	Georgia Tech
11	Nebraska
12	Houston
13	Miami (FL)
14	Mississippi State
15	UCLA
16	Arizona State
17	Baylor
18	Penn State
19	North Carolina
20	Auburn
21	Florida
22	Alabama
23	Cal State Fullerton
24	Wake Forest
25	Loyola Marymount

== Baseball America ==
Currently, only the final poll from the 2000 season is available.

Rank	Team
1	LSU
2	Stanford
3	Florida State
4	South Carolina
5	Southern California
6	Georgia Tech
7	Clemson
8	Nebraska
9	Louisiana–Lafayette
10	Texas
11	Houston
12	Arizona State
13	Miami (FL)
14	Baylor
15	Mississippi State
16	Loyola Marymount
17	UCLA
18	San Jose State
19	Penn State
20	Florida
21	Wake Forest
22	Cal State Fullerton
23	Rutgers
24	Alabama
25	Auburn

== Collegiate Baseball ==
	Preseason Dec 15	Week 1 Feb 14	Week 2 Feb 21	Week 3 Feb 28	Week 4 Mar 6	Week 5 Mar 13	Week 6 Mar 20	Week 7 Mar 27	Week 8 Apr 3	Week 9 Apr 10	Week 10 Apr 17	Week 11 Apr 24	Week 12 May 1	Week 13 May 8	Week 14 May 15	Week 15 May 22	Week 16 May 29	Week 17 June 5	Week 18 June 19	
1.	Stanford	Florida State (7–2)	Florida State (9–2)	Florida State (13–2)	Florida State (18–2)	Florida State (23–2)	Clemson (19–3)	Clemson (23–3)	Florida State (31–5)	Florida State (35–5)	South Carolina (36–4)	South Carolina (41–4)	South Carolina (45–4)	South Carolina (46–6)	South Carolina (50–6)	Georgia Tech (47–14)	Georgia Tech (50–14)	Stanford (47–15)	LSU (52–17)	1.
2.	Cal State Fullerton	UCLA (6–1)	Stanford (7–4)	Stanford (11–4)	North Carolina (16–0)	North Carolina (20–0)	South Carolina (22–1)	Florida State (28–4)	Texas (29–6)	South Carolina (32–4)	Florida State (37–7)	Florida State (39–8)	Florida State (41–9)	Stanford (37–12)	Stanford (39–12)	Stanford (42–13)	South Carolina (55–8)	LSU (48–17)	Stanford (50–16)	2.
3.	Alabama	Stanford (6–3)	LSU (6–1)	North Carolina (13–0)	Stanford (14–5)	Stanford (14–5)	Florida State (25–4)	Texas (26–5)	South Carolina (28–4)	Texas (32–7)	Arizona State (33–9)	Arizona State (31–10)	Stanford (34–11)	Georgia Tech (38–12)	Georgia Tech (42–14)	South Carolina (52–8)	Stanford (45–14)	Clemson (50–16)	Florida State (53–19)	3.
4.	UCLA	Alabama (2–1)	North Carolina (9–0)	Texas (13–3)	Texas (16–4)	Clemson (15–2)	Stanford (16–6)	Stanford (19–7)	Louisiana–Lafayette (28–2)	Arizona State (30–9)	Stanford (29–9)	Stanford (31–10)	Georgia Tech (37–11)	Florida State (41–11)	Arizona State (40–12)	Arizona State (42–13)	LSU (46–17)	Florida State (51–17)	Louisiana–Lafayette (49–20)	4.
5.	Miami (FL)	LSU (3–0)	Texas (9–3)	Houston (11–3)	Southern California (11–3)	South Carolina (19–0)	Texas (22–5)	South Carolina (24–3)	Arizona State (28–8)	Stanford (25–9)	Texas (33–9)	Georgia Tech (34–10)	Arizona State (37–12)	Arizona State (37–12)	Baylor (42–14)	Baylor (45–15)	Clemson (48–16)	Southern California (43–18)	Southern California (44–20)	5.
6.	Florida State	Cal State Fullerton (2–4)	Georgia Tech (5–1)	Georgia Tech (8–2)	Auburn (18–3)	Texas (19–5)	Houston (19–7)	Louisiana–Lafayette (23–2)	Stanford (21–9)	Clemson (28–7)	Georgia Tech (31–8)	Baylor (34–13)	Baylor (39–13)	Baylor (39–13)	Clemson (42–14)	Nebraska (47–15)	Houston (47–16)	Texas (46–19)	Clemson (51–18)	6.
7.	Rice	Georgia Tech (2–0)	Cal State Fullerton (5–5)	Cal State Fullerton (5–5)	Cal State Fullerton (7–5)	Alabama (15–6)	North Carolina (21–3)	Auburn (26–6)	North Carolina (27–6)	LSU (26–10)	Clemson (31–9)	Clemson (35–10)	Mississippi State (33–12)	Mississippi State (36–13)	Nebraska (42–14)	LSU (43–17)	Florida State (49–16)	San Jose State (41–22)	Texas (46–21)	7.
8.	LSU	Texas (7–2)	Alabama (4–3)	Clemson (8–1)	Clemson (11–2)	Long Beach State (14–4)	Louisiana–Lafayette (21–1)	Arizona State (26–7)	Clemson (24–6)	Georgia Tech (26–8)	LSU (29–11)	Texas (34–11)	Texas (37–12)	Clemson (39–12)	Florida State (43–13)	Clemson (45–16)	Miami (FL) (40–17–1)	Louisiana–Lafayette (47–18)	San Jose State (41–24)	8.
9.	Georgia Tech	North Carolina (6–0)	Clemson (5–1)	Alabama (8–4)	Alabama (12–5)	Houston (15–7)	Arizona State (24–6)	Houston (20–9)	Houston (22–9)	Louisiana–Lafayette (30–4)	Baylor (31–11)	LSU (32–13)	Clemson (37–12)	Texas (38–14)	Houston (39–14)	Houston (44–15)	Nebraska (50–15)	South Carolina (56–10)	South Carolina (56–10)	9.
10.	Houston	Houston (5–2)	Houston (7–3)	Miami (FL) (11–5)	Miami (FL) (14–6)	Louisiana–Lafayette (18–1)	Auburn (23–6)	Southern California (19–9)	Southern California (22–10)	Houston (24–11)	Wake Forest (32–11–1)	Houston (30–13)	LSU (35–14)	Nebraska (37–13)	LSU (39–17)	Florida State (45–15)	Mississippi State (41–18)	Georgia Tech (50–16)	Georgia Tech (50–16)	10.
11.	Clemson	Clemson (2–1)	Miami (FL) (8–5)	Southern California (9–3)	South Carolina (15–0)	Arizona State (20–5)	Long Beach State (16–6)	Cal State Fullerton (16–7)	Cal State Fullerton (19–8)	Wake Forest (29–9–1)	Miami (FL) (26–13–1)	Miami (FL) (28–14)	Houston (33–14)	Houston (36–14)	Mississippi State (38–15)	Miami (FL) (37–17–1)	Texas (44–19)	Nebraska (51–17)	Nebraska (51–17)	11.
12.	Texas	Miami (FL) (4–5)	Tulane (5–2)	Auburn (14–3)	Baylor (15–3)	Southern California (12–6)	Georgia (15–6)	Long Beach State (19–7)	LSU (21–10)	Cal State Fullerton 921–10)	Auburn (34–10)	Auburn (36–11)	Miami (FL) (30–15–1)	LSU (37–16)	Miami (FL) (34–17–1)	Mississippi State (38–17)	Arizona State (44–15)	Arizona State (44–15)	Arizona State (44–15)	12.
13.	Tulane	Tulane (2–1)	Auburn (10–2)	Wichita State (3–0)	Wichita State (4–1)	Auburn (19–6)	Southern California (14–9)	North Carolina (24–5)	Auburn (28–8)	Baylor (28–11)	North Carolina (33–9)	Mississippi State (29–11)	Nebraska (36–12)	Miami (FL) (36–6)	Texas (39–16)	Texas (40–18)	Southern California (41–18)	Houston (48–18)	Houston (48–18)	13.
14.	Wichita State	Wichita State (0–0)	Wichita State (0–0)	South Carolina (12–0)	Long Beach State (11–4)	Cal State Fullerton (9–7)	Cal State Fullerton (13–7)	Alabama (19–10)	Miami (FL) (24–9–1)	North Carolina (28–9)	Houston (26–13)	Loyola Marymount (28–15)	Loyola Marymount (32–15)	Loyola Marymount (35–15)	Wake Forest (38–16–1)	Wake Forest (39–18–1)	UCLA (38–24)	Miami (FL) (41–19–1)	Miami (FL) (41–19–1)	14.
15.	Southern California	Auburn (7–0)	UCLA (6–5)	LSU (6–5)	Arizona State (18–4)	Miami (FL) (16–8)	Alabama (16–9)	Creighton (21–4)	Georgia Tech (23–8)	UCLA (22–13)	Mississippi State (26–9)	Rutgers (30–11)	Auburn (37–13)	Wake Forest (34–14–1)	North Carolina (43–13)	North Carolina (44–15)	San Jose State (39–21)	Mississippi State (41–20)	Mississippi State (41–20)	15.
16.	Baylor	Texas Tech (6–2)	Southern California (6–3)	Baylor (11–3)	LSU (10–6)	Baylor (18–5)	Georgia Tech (15–6)	Miami (FL) (22–9–1)	East Carolina (28–5)	Southern California (23–13)	Long Beach State (25–13)	Wake Forest (34–14–1)	Wake Forest (34–14–1)	North Carolina (42–11)	Cal State Fullerton (34–17)	Southern California (38–18)	Florida (44–23–1)	UCLA (38–26)	UCLA (38–26)	16.
17.	Auburn	Southern California (5–3)	Baylor (8–2)	Long Beach State (9–3)	Houston (12–6)	East Carolina (17–3)	Miami (FL) (19–8–1)	LSU (18–9)	Mississippi State (21–5)	Auburn (30–10)	Loyola Marymount (26–14)	Cal State Fullerton (24–14–1)	Cal State Fullerton (27–15)	Cal State Fullerton (30–16)	Auburn (40–16)	Cal State Fulleton (36–19)	Baylor (45–17)	Florida (44–23–1)	Florida (44–23–1)	17.
18.	Texas Tech	Baylor (4–2)	South Carolina (8–0)	Arizona State (15–4)	Georgia Tech (8–5)	Fresno State (19–5)	Creighton (18–2)	East Carolina (24–5)	Baylor (24–10)	Mississippi State (24–8)	Cal State Fullerton (22–13)	North Carolina (36–11)	North Carolina (39–11)	Alabama (35–18)	Southern California (35–18)	Florida (41–21–1)	Penn State (45–17)	Baylor (45–17)	Baylor (45–17)	18.
19.	Arizona	Arizona State (11–2)	Arizona State (12–4)	East Carolina (9–2)	Louisiana–Lafayette (15–1)	Wichita State (5–3)	Mississippi State (18–2)	Mississippi State (20–4)	Georgia (19–10)	Miami (FL) (24–12–1)	UCLA (24–15)	Nebraska (31–11)	Alabama (33–17)	Auburn (38–15)	Alabama (36–20)	Auburn (40–18)	Wake Forest (41–20–1)	Penn State (45–19)	Penn State (45–19)	19.
20.	North Carolina	Florida (5–3)	East Carolina (6–1)	Fresno State (11–3)	Kentucky (13–0)	Kentucky (16–2)	Wichita State (9–4)	Baylor (20–9)	Long Beach State (20–10)	Long Beach State (23–11)	Rutgers (27–11)	Oklahoma (31–15)	Southern California (30–18)	Southern California (31–18)	Loyola Marymount (37–17)	Loyola Marymount (39–17)	North Carolina (46–17)	Wake Forest (41–20–1)	Wake Forest (41–20–1)	20.
21.	Texas A&M	South Carolina (5–0)	Rice (6–5)	Kentucky (10–0)	East Carolina (12–3)	Creighton (15–2)	Baylor (18–8)	Notre Dame (15–4)	Fresno State (25–8)	East Carolina (29–8)	East Carolina (32–10)	Long Beach State (25–16)	Rutgers (32–13)	Rutgers (34–13)	Florida (38–20–1)	Alabama (38–22)	Cal State Fullerton (38–21)	North Carolina (46–17)	North Carolina (46–17)	21.
22.	Long Beach State	Rice (3–4)	Long Beach State (6–3)	Loyola Marymount (8–3)	Fresno State (14–4)	Georgia (12–4)	East Carolina (20–5)	Georgia Tech (18–8)	Creighton (23–6)	Creigthon (26–7)	Southern California (25–15)	Georgia (28–16)	Florida (33–18–1)	San Jose State (34–16)	UCLA (33–22)	UCLA (35–24)	Louisiana–Lafayette (45–17)	Cal State Fullerton (38–21)	Cal State Fullerton (38–21)	22.
23.	Oklahoma State	East Carolina (3–1)	Fresno State (8–2)	Mississippi State (7–0)	Illinois (5–1)	LSU (12–8)	LSU (15–8)	Fresno State (23–8)	UCF (26–9)	Fresno State (27–10)	UCF (31–12)	Southern California (27–17)	Louisiana–Lafayette (37–11)	Louisiana–Lafayette (39–12)	UCF (41–15)	Nevada (37–17)	Stetson (48–16)	Stetson (48–16)	Stetson (48–16)	23.
24.	Florida	Long Beach State (3–3)	Oklahoma State (6–3)	UCLA (7–7)	Florida Atlantic (12–5)	Georgia Tech (10–6)	Notre Dame (12–3)	Stetson (25–5)	Wake Forest (24–9)	Notre Dame (22–7)	Fresno State (29–11)	Fresno State (32–12)	San Jose State (32–16)	Florida (34–20–1)	Nevada (34–17)	Rice (40–21)	Loyola Marymount (40–19)	Loyola Marymount (40–19)	Loyola Marymount (40–19)	24.
25.	Notre Dame	Notre Dame (0–0)	Notre Dame (0–0)	Florida Atlantic (9–4)	Tennessee (16–4)	Florida Atlantic (17–5)	Wake Forest (17–7)	UCF (22–9)	UCLA (20–11)	Stetson (29–8)	Nebraska (26–11)	UCF (33–14)	Nevada (30–15)	Minnesota (35–17)	Rice (35–20)	Rutgers (39–16)	Auburn (41–20)	Auburn (41–20)	Auburn (41–20)	25.
26.	Pepperdine	Fresno State (5–2)	Texas Tech (6–6)	Wake Forest (7–2)	Mississippi State (9–2)	Mississippi State (14–2)	Fresno State (20–7)	Georgia (16–10)	Notre Dame (18–6)	Loyola Marymount (23–13)	Notre Dame (26–9)	Notre Dame (32–9)	UCF (35–15)	UCF (38–15)	Wichita State (38–18)	Wichita State (42–19)	Rice (43–23)	Rice (43–23)	Rice (43–23)	26.
27.	Minnesota	Minnesota (1–0)	Florida (5–5)	Oklahoma State (7–5)	Loyola Marymount (11–5)	Notre Dame (8–2)	Stetson (21–4)	Kentucky (21–5)	Stetson (27–7)	Florida Atlantic (30–8)	Wichita State (25–10)	Florida (21–17–1)	UCLA (28–20)	Nevada (31–17)	Rutgers (35–15)	UCF (41–17)	Alabama (41–24)	Alabama (41–24)	Alabama (41–24)	27.
28.	Arizona State	Nevada (6–4)	FIU (12–0)	Louisiana–Lafayette (11–1)	Notre Dame (4–2)	Illinois (7–2)	Kentucky (18–4)	Pepperdine (18–10)	Kentucky (24–6)	Illinois (23–)	Illinois (27–11)	UCLA (25–18)	Penn State (35–9)	Fresno State (37–15)	Fresno State (39–17)	Stetson (46–14)	Wichita State (44–21)	Wichita State (44–21)	Wichita State (44–21)	28.
29.	South Alabama	South Alabama (0–0)	Louisiana–Monroe (10–1)	Notre Dame (2–1)	Wake Forest (10–3)	Loyola Marymount (14–5)	Nevada (18–8)	Oral Roberts (17–6)	Illinois (19–7)	Florida (26–14–1)	Tulane (26–14–1)	Old Dominion (27–16–1)	Minnesota (30–17)	UCLA (30–22)	New Orleans (35–21)	Oklahoma (39–21)	East Carolina (46–18)	East Carolina (46–18)	East Carolina (46–18)	29.
30.	Oral Roberts	Loyola Marymount (3–1)	VCU (8–1)	Tennessee (12–4)	FIU (18–2)	Oral Roberts (12–4)	New Orleans (13–5)	Nebraska (17–8)	Florida Atlantic (27–8)	San Jose State (25–11)	Florida Atlantic (33–10)	Minnesota (26–16)	Texas Tech (30–20)	Texas Tech (32–20)	Florida Atlantic (41–15)	Oral Roberts (48–13)	UCF (43–19)	UCF (43–19)	UCF (43–19)	30.
	Preseason Dec 15	Week 1 Feb 14	Week 2 Feb 21	Week 3 Feb 28	Week 4 Mar 6	Week 5 Mar 13	Week 6 Mar 20	Week 7 Mar 27	Week 8 Apr 3	Week 9 Apr 10	Week 10 Apr 17	Week 11 Apr 24	Week 12 May 1	Week 13 May 8	Week 14 May 15	Week 15 May 22	Week 16 May 29	Week 17 June 5	Week 18 June 19	
		Dropped: 19 Arizona; 21 Texas A&M; 23 Oklahoma State; 26 Pepperdine; 30 Oral Roberts	Dropped: 27 Minnesota; 28 Nevada; 29 South Alabama; 30 Loyola Marymount	Dropped: 21 Rice; 22 Long Beach State; 26 Texas Tech; 27 Florida; 28 FIU; 29 Louisiana–Monroe; 30 VCU	Dropped: 24 UCLA; 27 Oklahoma State	Dropped: 29 Wake Forest; 30 FIU	Dropped: 25 Florida Atlantic; 28 Illinois; 29 Loyola Marymount; 30 Oral Roberts	Dropped: 20 Wichita State; 25 Wake Forest; 29 Nevada; 30 New Orleans	Dropped: 14 Alabama; 28 Pepperdine; 29 Oral Roberts; 30 Nebraska	Dropped: 19 Georgia; 23 UCF; 28 Kentucky	Dropped: 9 Louisiana–Lafayette; 22 Creighton; 25 Stetson; 29 Florida; 30 San Jose State	Dropped: 21 East Carolina; 27 Wichita State; 28 Illinois; 29 Tulane; 30 Florida Atlantic	Dropped: 20 Oklahoma; 21 Long Beach State; 22 Georgia; 24 Fresno State; 26 Notre Dame; 29 Old Dominion	Dropped: 28 Penn State	Dropped: 22 San Jose State; 23 Louisiana–Lafayette; 25 Minnesota; 30 Texas Tech	Dropped: 28 Fresno State; 29 New Orleans; 30 Florida Atlantic	Dropped: 25 Rutgers; 29 Oklahoma; 30 Oral Roberts	None	None	

The pre-season poll ranked the top 40 teams. Those not listed in the table above were: 31. Wake Forest; 32. Arkansas; 33. Nevada; 34. South Carolina; 35. Illinois; 36. Florida Atlantic; 37. Ohio State; 38. California; 39. Nebraska; 40. Ole Miss
