= 2000 Florida State Seminoles baseball team =

American college baseball season

2000 Florida State Seminoles baseball

ACC champions NCAA Atlantic II Regional champions

College World Series, 2–2
- Conference: Atlantic Coast Conference
- Record: 53–20 (19–5 ACC)
- Head coach: Mike Martin (21st year)
- Home stadium: Dick Howser Stadium

2000 Atlantic Coast Conference baseball standings
| | Conf. | | | | Overall |
| Team | W | | L | PCT | W | | L | PCT |
|---|---|---|---|---|---|---|---|---|
| No. 10 Georgia Tech ‍†‍‡‍^{y} | 18 | – | 6 | .750 | 50 | – | 16 | .758 |
| No. 6 Clemson ‍‍‍^{y} | 17 | – | 7 | .708 | 51 | – | 18 | .739 |
| No. 3 Florida State ‍‍‍^{y} | 15 | – | 9 | .625 | 53 | – | 19 | .736 |
| No. 20 Wake Forest ‍‍‍^{y} | 14 | – | 10 | .583 | 41 | – | 20 | .672 |
| No. 21 North Carolina ‍‍‍^{y} | 12 | – | 12 | .500 | 46 | – | 17 | .730 |
| NC State ‍‍‍ | 10 | – | 14 | .417 | 30 | – | 28 | .517 |
| Virginia ‍‍‍ | 10 | – | 14 | .417 | 26 | – | 31 | .456 |
| Maryland ‍‍‍ | 5 | – | 17 | .227 | 24 | – | 33 | .421 |
| Duke ‍‍‍ | 5 | – | 19 | .208 | 17 | – | 41 | .293 |
† – Conference champion ‡ – Tournament champion y – Invited to the NCAA tournament As of June 30, 2000; Rankings from Collegiate Baseball

The 2000 Florida State Seminoles baseball team represented Florida State University in the 2000 NCAA Division I baseball season. The Seminoles played their home games at Dick Howser Stadium, and played as part of the Atlantic Coast Conference. The team was coached by Mike Martin in his twenty-first season as head coach at Florida State.

The Seminoles reached the College World Series, their seventeenth appearance in Omaha, where they finished in third place after splitting two games against Southern California, a win against Texas and a semifinal loss to eventual champion LSU.

== Personnel ==
=== Roster ===
2000 Florida State Seminoles roster
| Pitchers: 4 - John Bentley - (redshirt) Junior; 7 - Daniel Hodges - Freshman; 13 - Nick Whidden - (redshirt) Freshman; 17 - Chris Whidden - Sophomore; 20 - Robby Read - (redshirt) Freshman; 21 - Blair Varnes - (redshirt) Sophomore; 24 - Eric Roman - (redshirt) Freshman; 29 - Mike DiBlasi - Senior; 35 - Mike Ziegler - Junior; 37 - Chris Ginn - Junior; 41 - Jon McDonald - (redshirt) Junior; 46 - Matt Lynch - Freshman | Catchers: 10 - Chris Hart - Sophomore; 44 - Javier Neto - Sophomore; 16 - Cory Posey - Senior; 32 - Blair McCaleb - Sophomore; Infielders: 1 - Brett Groves - Junior; 2 - Bobby Spano - Sophomore; 5 - Brian Kraft - Freshman; 18 - Pichi Balet - Junior; 22 - Justin McClain - Freshman; 26 - Scott Boyd - Junior; 27 - Ryan Barthelemy - Sophomore; 31 - Marshall McDougall - Senior; 33 - John Halliday - Senior | Outfielders: 8 - Mike Futrell - Sophomore; 9 - Karl Jernigan - Junior; 14 - Clint Thigpen - (redshirt) Freshman; 15 - Chris Smith - Sophomore; 19 - Ryan West - Freshman; 39 - John-Ford Griffin - Sophomore |

=== Coaches ===
2000 Florida State Seminoles baseball coaching staff
- Mike Martin - Head coach - 21st year

== Schedule and results ==
Legend
| Florida State win |
| Florida State loss |

2000 Florida State Seminoles baseball game log: 53–19
Regular season: 43–13

January/February: 14–2
| Date | Opponent | Rank | Site/stadium | Score | Overall record | ACC record |
|---|---|---|---|---|---|---|
| Jan 29 | Western Kentucky* | No. 6 | Dick Howser Stadium • Tallahassee, FL | W 8–1 | 1–0 | — |
| Jan 29 | Western Kentucky* | No. 6 | Dick Howser Stadium • Tallahassee, FL | W 2–1 | 2–0 | — |
| Jan 30 | Western Kentucky* | No. 6 | Dick Howser Stadium • Tallahassee, FL | W 6–1 | 3–0 | — |
| Feb 4 | at No. 28 Arizona State* | No. 6 | Packard Stadium • Tempe, AZ | W 11–10 | 4–0 | — |
| Feb 5 | at No. 28 Arizona State* | No. 6 | Packard Stadium • Tempe, AZ | L 9–15 | 4–1 | — |
| Feb 6 | at No. 28 Arizona State* | No. 6 | Packard Stadium • Tempe, AZ | W 9–7 | 5–1 | — |
| Feb 11 | No. 1 Stanford* | No. 6 | Dick Howser Stadium • Tallahassee, FL | W 11–4 | 6–1 | — |
| Feb 12 | No. 1 Stanford* | No. 6 | Dick Howser Stadium • Tallahassee, FL | L 6–8 | 6–2 | — |
| Feb 13 | No. 1 Stanford* | No. 6 | Dick Howser Stadium • Tallahassee, FL | W 13–1 | 7–2 | — |
| Feb 19 | at No. 20 Florida* | No. 1 | Alfred A. McKethan Stadium • Gainesville, FL | W 15–6 | 8–2 | — |
| Feb 20 | at No. 20 Florida* | No. 1 | Alfred A. McKethan Stadium • Gainesville, FL | W 17–8 | 9–2 | — |
| Feb 22 | Appalachian State* | No. 1 | Dick Howser Stadium • Tallahassee, FL | W 8–2 | 10–2 | — |
| Feb 23 | Appalachian State* | No. 1 | Dick Howser Stadium • Tallahassee, FL | W 8–1 | 11–2 | — |
| Feb 26 | No. 27 Florida* | No. 1 | Dick Howser Stadium • Tallahassee, FL | W 6–2 | 12–2 | — |
| Feb 27 | No. 27 Florida* | No. 1 | Dick Howser Stadium • Tallahassee, FL | W 8–7 | 13–2 | — |
| Feb 29 | Charleston Southern* | No. 1 | Dick Howser Stadium • Tallahassee, FL | W 7–2 | 14–2 | — |

March: 15–2
| Date | Opponent | Rank | Site/stadium | Score | Overall record | ACC record |
|---|---|---|---|---|---|---|
| Mar 1 | Charleston Southern* | No. 1 | Dick Howser Stadium • Tallahassee, FL | W 12–1 | 15–2 | — |
| Mar 3 | Pittsburgh* | No. 1 | Dick Howser Stadium • Tallahassee, FL | W 6–1 | 16–2 | — |
| Mar 4 | Pittsburgh* | No. 1 | Dick Howser Stadium • Tallahassee, FL | W 12–0 | 17–2 | — |
| Mar 5 | Pittsburgh* | No. 1 | Dick Howser Stadium • Tallahassee, FL | W 14–4 | 18–2 | — |
| Mar 7 | vs. St. Joseph's* | No. 1 | Radiology Associates Field at Jackie Robinson Ballpark • Daytona Beach, FL | W 15–2 | 19–2 | — |
| Mar 8 | vs. Siena* | No. 1 | Jackie Robinson Ballpark • Daytona Beach, FL | W 9–2 | 20–2 | — |
| Mar 10 | Duke | No. 1 | Dick Howser Stadium • Tallahassee, FL | W 17–0 | 21–2 | 1–0 |
| Mar 11 | Duke | No. 1 | Dick Howser Stadium • Tallahassee, FL | W 8–3 | 22–2 | 2–0 |
| Mar 12 | Duke | No. 1 | Dick Howser Stadium • Tallahassee, FL | W 9–6 | 23–2 | 3–0 |
| Mar 14 | South Florida* | No. 1 | Dick Howser Stadium • Tallahassee, FL | W 18–7 | 24–2 | — |
| Mar 17 | at Wake Forest | No. 1 | Gene Hooks Stadium • Winston-Salem, NC | L 1–7 | 24–3 | 3–1 |
| Mar 18 | at Wake Forest | No. 1 | Gene Hooks Stadium • Winston-Salem, NC | L 4–7 | 24–4 | 3–2 |
| Mar 19 | at Wake Forest | No. 1 | Gene Hooks Stadium • Winston-Salem, NC | W 12–4 | 25–4 | 4–2 |
| Mar 23 | Maryland | No. 3 | Dick Howser Stadium • Tallahassee, FL | W 11–0 | 26–4 | 5–2 |
| Mar 24 | Maryland | No. 3 | Dick Howser Stadium • Tallahassee, FL | W 11–0 | 27–4 | 6–2 |
| Mar 25 | Maryland | No. 3 | Dick Howser Stadium • Tallahassee, FL | W 10–0 | 28–4 | 7–2 |
| Mar 28 | Mercer* | No. 2 | Dick Howser Stadium • Tallahassee, FL | W 15–5 | 29–4 | — |

April: 12–5
| Date | Opponent | Rank | Site/stadium | Score | Overall record | ACC record |
|---|---|---|---|---|---|---|
| Apr 1 | at Virginia | No. 2 | UVA Baseball Field • Charlottesville, VA | W 9–6 | 30–4 | 8–2 |
| Apr 2 | at Virginia | No. 2 | UVA Baseball Field • Charlottesville, VA | L 1–2 | 30–5 | 8–3 |
| Apr 2 | at Virginia | No. 2 | UVA Baseball Field • Charlottesville, VA | W 10–4 | 31–5 | 9–3 |
| Apr 5 | at Jacksonville* | No. 1 | John Sessions Stadium • Jacksonville, FL | W 12–6 | 32–5 | — |
| Apr 7 | No. 14 Miami (FL)* | No. 1 | Dick Howser Stadium • Tallahassee, FL | W 14–13^{17} | 33–5 | — |
| Apr 8 | No. 14 Miami (FL)* | No. 1 | Dick Howser Stadium • Tallahassee, FL | W 12–2 | 34–5 | — |
| Apr 9 | No. 14 Miami (FL)* | No. 1 | Dick Howser Stadium • Tallahassee, FL | W 5–4 | 35–5 | — |
| Apr 12 | Jacksonville* | No. 1 | Dick Howser Stadium • Tallahassee, FL | W 7–5 | 36–5 | — |
| Apr 14 | at No. 19 Miami (FL)* | No. 1 | Mark Light Field • Coral Gables, FL | L 3–7 | 36–6 | — |
| Apr 15 | at No. 19 Miami (FL)* | No. 1 | Mark Light Field • Coral Gables, FL | L 3–7 | 36–7 | — |
| Apr 16 | at No. 19 Miami (FL)* | No. 1 | Mark Light Field • Coral Gables, FL | W 14–3 | 37–7 | — |
| Apr 21 | No. 6 Georgia Tech | No. 2 | Dick Howser Stadium • Tallahassee, FL | W 6–0 | 38–7 | 10–3 |
| Apr 22 | No. 6 Georgia Tech | No. 2 | Dick Howser Stadium • Tallahassee, FL | L 0–5 | 38–8 | 10–4 |
| Apr 23 | No. 6 Georgia Tech | No. 2 | Dick Howser Stadium • Tallahassee, FL | W 7–5 | 39–8 | 11–4 |
| Apr 28 | NC State | No. 2 | Dick Howser Stadium • Tallahassee, FL | L 4–5 | 39–9 | 11–5 |
| Apr 29 | NC State | No. 2 | Dick Howser Stadium • Tallahassee, FL | W 8–2 | 40–9 | 12–5 |
| Apr 30 | NC State | No. 2 | Dick Howser Stadium • Tallahassee, FL | W 6–5 | 41–9 | 13–5 |

May: 2–4
| Date | Opponent | Rank | Site/stadium | Score | Overall record | ACC record |
|---|---|---|---|---|---|---|
| May 6 | at No. 9 Clemson | No. 2 | Beautiful Tiger Field • Clemson, SC | L 7–8 | 41–10 | 13–6 |
| May 7 | at No. 9 Clemson | No. 2 | Beautiful Tiger Field • Clemson, SC | L 4–5 | 41–11 | 13–7 |
| May 8 | at No. 8 Clemson | No. 4 | Beautiful Tiger Field • Clemson, SC | L 4–7 | 41–12 | 13–8 |
| May 12 | at No. 16 North Carolina | No. 4 | Boshamer Stadium • Chapel Hill, NC | W 6–2 | 42–12 | 14–8 |
| May 13 | at No. 16 North Carolina | No. 4 | Boshamer Stadium • Chapel Hill, NC | L 5–6 | 42–13 | 14–9 |
| May 14 | at No. 16 North Carolina | No. 4 | Boshamer Stadium • Chapel Hill, NC | W 4–2 | 43–13 | 15–9 |

Postseason: 10–6

ACC Tournament: 2–2
| Date | Opponent | Seed/Rank | Site/stadium | Score | Overall record | ACCT Record |
|---|---|---|---|---|---|---|
| May 17 | vs. (6) NC State | (3) No. 8 | Knights Stadium • Fort Mill, SC | W 8–6 | 44–13 | 1–0 |
| May 18 | vs. (2) No. 6 Clemson | (3) No. 8 | Knights Stadium • Fort Mill, SC | L 4–8 | 44–14 | 1–1 |
| May 19 | vs. (5) No. 15 North Carolina | (3) No. 8 | Knights Stadium • Fort Mill, SC | W 4–1 | 45–14 | 2–1 |
| May 20 | vs. (1) No. 3 Georgia Tech | (3) No. 8 | Knights Stadium • Fort Mill, SC | L 3–10 | 45–15 | 2–2 |

NCAA Tallahassee Regional: 4–1
| Date | Opponent | Seed/Rank | Site/stadium | Score | Overall record | NCAAT record |
|---|---|---|---|---|---|---|
| May 26 | (4) Bethune-Cookman | (1) No. 10 | Dick Howser Stadium • Tallahassee, FL | W 6–3 | 46–15 | 1–0 |
| May 27 | (2) No. 27 UCF | (1) No. 10 | Dick Howser Stadium • Tallahassee, FL | L 8–9 | 46–16 | 1–1 |
| May 27 | (3) Evansville | (1) No. 10 | Dick Howser Stadium • Tallahassee, FL | W 11–2 | 47–16 | 2–1 |
| May 28 | (2) No. 27 UCF | (1) No. 10 | Dick Howser Stadium • Tallahassee, FL | W 6–1 | 48–16 | 3–1 |
| May 28 | (2) No. 27 UCF | (1) No. 10 | Dick Howser Stadium • Tallahassee, FL | W 8–1 | 49–16 | 4–1 |

NCAA Tallahassee Super Regional: 2–1
| Date | Opponent | Seed/Rank | Site/stadium | Score | Overall record | NCAAT record |
|---|---|---|---|---|---|---|
| June 2 | No. 8 Miami (FL) | (6) No. 7 | Dick Howser Stadium • Tallahassee, FL | W 9–2 | 50–16 | 5–1 |
| June 3 | No. 8 Miami (FL) | (6) No. 7 | Dick Howser Stadium • Tallahassee, FL | L 5–7 | 50–17 | 5–2 |
| June 4 | No. 8 Miami (FL) | (6) No. 7 | Dick Howser Stadium • Tallahassee, FL | W 6–1 | 51–17 | 6–2 |

College World Series: 2–2
| Date | Opponent | Seed/Rank | Site/stadium | Score | Overall record | CWS record |
|---|---|---|---|---|---|---|
| June 10 | vs. No. 5 Southern California | (6) No. 4 | Johnny Rosenblatt Stadium • Omaha, NE | L 4–6 | 51–18 | 0–1 |
| June 12 | vs. No. 6 Texas | (6) No. 4 | Johnny Rosenblatt Stadium • Omaha, NE | W 6–2 | 52–18 | 1–1 |
| June 14 | vs. No. 5 Southern California | (6) No. 4 | Johnny Rosenblatt Stadium • Omaha, NE | W 3–2 | 53–18 | 2–1 |
| June 15 | vs. (2) No. 2 LSU | (6) No. 4 | Johnny Rosenblatt Stadium • Omaha, NE | L 3–6 | 53–19 | 2–2 |
