= 2000 Atlantic Coast Conference baseball tournament =

American college baseball tournament

- Teams: 9
- Format: Play-in round followed by eight-team double elimination
- Finals site: Knights Stadium; Fort Mill, South Carolina
- Champions: Georgia Tech (5th title)
- Winning coach: Danny Hall (1st title)
- MVP: Jason Basil (Georgia Tech)
- Attendance: 26,144

2000 Atlantic Coast Conference baseball standings
	Conf.				Overall
Team	W		L	PCT	W		L	PCT
No. 10 Georgia Tech ‍†‍‡‍^{y}	18	–	6	.750	50	–	16	.758
No. 6 Clemson ‍‍‍^{y}	17	–	7	.708	51	–	18	.739
No. 3 Florida State ‍‍‍^{y}	15	–	9	.625	53	–	19	.736
No. 20 Wake Forest ‍‍‍^{y}	14	–	10	.583	41	–	20	.672
No. 21 North Carolina ‍‍‍^{y}	12	–	12	.500	46	–	17	.730
NC State ‍‍‍	10	–	14	.417	30	–	28	.517
Virginia ‍‍‍	10	–	14	.417	26	–	31	.456
Maryland ‍‍‍	5	–	17	.227	24	–	33	.421
Duke ‍‍‍	5	–	19	.208	17	–	41	.293
† – Conference champion ‡ – Tournament champion y – Invited to the NCAA tournament As of June 30, 2000; Rankings from Collegiate Baseball

The 2000 Atlantic Coast Conference baseball tournament was held at the Knights Stadium in Fort Mill, South Carolina, from May 16 through 21. Georgia Tech won the tournament and earned the Atlantic Coast Conference's automatic bid to the 2000 NCAA Division I baseball tournament.

== Tournament ==
=== Play-in game ===
- The two teams with the worst records in regular season conference play faced each other in a single elimination situation to earn the 8th spot in the conference tournament.

Play-in game
9	Duke	6
8	Maryland	4

=== Main Bracket ===
==== Seeding Procedure ====
From TheACC.com:

On Saturday (The Semifinals) of the ACC Baseball Tournament, the match-up between the four remaining teams is determined by previous opponents. If teams have played previously in the tournament, every attempt will be made to avoid a repeat match-up between teams, regardless of seed. If it is impossible to avoid a match-up that already occurred, then the determination is based on avoiding the most recent, current tournament match-up, regardless of seed. If no match-ups have occurred, the team left in the winners bracket will play the lowest seeded team from the losers bracket.

==== Bracket ====
Upper round 1
9	Duke	3
1	Georgia Tech	9
5	North Carolina	7
4	Wake Forest	8
6	NC State	6
3	Florida State	8
7	Virginia	5
2	Clemson	9

Upper round 2
4	Wake Forest	3
1	Georgia Tech	6
3	Florida State	4
2	Clemson	8
Lower round 1
5	North Carolina	13
9	Duke	7
7	Virginia	9
6	NC State	5

Upper final
2	Clemson	8
1	Georgia Tech	9
Lower round 2
3	Florida State	4
5	North Carolina	1
4	Wake Forest	3
7	Virginia	8

Semifinals
1	Georgia Tech	10
3	Florida State	3
2	Clemson	12
7	Virginia	5

Final
2	Clemson	4
1	Georgia Tech	8

== All-Tournament Team ==
Position	Player	School
1B	Jon Benick	Virginia
2B	Marshall McDougall	Florida State
3B	Khalil Greene	Clemson
SS	Time LaVigne	Virginia
C	Bryan Prince	Georgia Tech
OF	Patrick Boyd	Clemson
OF	Jason Basil	Georgia Tech
OF	Brad Stockton	Georgia Tech
DH	Jeff Baker	Clemson
P	Cory Vance	Georgia Tech
P	Ryan Motti	Clemson
MVP	Jason Basil	Georgia Tech

(*)Denotes Unanimous Selection

== See also ==
- College World Series
- NCAA Division I Baseball Championship
