= 2000 NCAA Division I baseball tournament =

American college sports championship

- Season: 2000
- Teams: 64
- Finals site: Johnny Rosenblatt Stadium; Omaha, NE
- Champions: LSU (5th title)
- Runner-up: Stanford (12th CWS Appearance)
- Winning coach: Skip Bertman (5th title)
- MOP: Trey Hodges (LSU)

The 2000 NCAA Division I baseball tournament was played at the end of the 2000 NCAA Division I baseball season to determine the national champion of college baseball. The tournament concluded with eight teams competing in the College World Series, a double-elimination tournament in its fifty fourth year. Sixteen regional competitions were held to determine the participants in the final event, with each winner advancing to a best of three series against another regional champion for the right to play in the College World Series. Each region was composed of four teams, resulting in 64 teams participating in the tournament at the conclusion of their regular season, and in some cases, after a conference tournament. The fifty-fourth tournament's champion was LSU, coached by Skip Bertman. The Most Outstanding Player was Trey Hodges of LSU.

== National seeds ==
Bold indicates CWS participant.

1. South Carolina
2. **LSU**
3. Georgia Tech
4. **Clemson**
5. Houston
6. **Florida State**
7. Arizona State
8. **Stanford**

== Regionals and super regionals ==
Bold indicates winner. * indicates host.

=== Columbia Super Regional ===
First round	Second round
1	**South Carolina**	**6**
4	Liberty	4
1	**South Carolina**	**6**
2	Wake Forest	1
3	Seton Hall	3
2	**Wake Forest**	**8**
Columbia Regional–Sarge Frye Field
4	**Liberty**	**10**
3	Seton Hall	2	4	Liberty	2
2	**Wake Forest**	**4**
1	**East Carolina**	**12**
4	Marist	3
1	East Carolina	3
2	**Louisiana–Lafayette**	**5**
3	McNeese State	5
2	**Louisiana–Lafayette**	**11**
Lafayette Regional–M. L. Tigue Moore Field
4	**Marist**	**6**
3	McNeese State	5	4	Marist	7
1	**East Carolina**	**8**^{11}

Regional finals
1	**South Carolina**	**8**	—
2	Wake Forest	4	—
2	**Louisiana–Lafayette**	**8**	—
1	East Carolina	5	—

Super regionals
1	South Carolina	**6**	1	2
**Louisiana–Lafayette**	3	**7**	**3**

=== Baton Rouge Super Regional ===
First round	Second round
1	**LSU**	**19**
4	Jackson State	1
1	**LSU**	**21**
3	Louisiana-Monroe	0
3	**Louisiana–Monroe**	**8**
2	New Orleans	3
Baton Rouge Regional–Alex Box Stadium
4	Jackson State	9
2	**New Orleans**	**24**	2	New Orleans	4
3	**Louisiana-Monroe**	**10**
1	**UCLA**	**13**
4	Delaware	12
1	**UCLA**	**10**
2	Oklahoma	5
3	Oral Roberts	5
2	**Oklahoma**	**6**^{11}
Oklahoma City Regional–Bricktown Ballpark
4	Delaware	2
3	**Oral Roberts**	**4**	3	Oral Roberts	7
2	**Oklahoma**	**9**

Regional finals
1	**LSU**	**5**	—
3	Louisiana-Monroe	3	—
1	**UCLA**	**11**	—
2	Oklahoma	3	—

Super regionals
2	**LSU**	**8**	**14**	—
UCLA	2	8	—

=== Atlanta Super Regional ===
First round	Second round
1	**Georgia Tech**	**11**
4	Georgia Southern	9
1	**Georgia Tech**	**24**
3	Stetson	1
3	**Stetson**	**9**
2	Auburn	5
Atlanta Regional–Russ Chandler Stadium
4	Georgia Southern	5
2	**Auburn**	**11**	2	Auburn	10
3	**Stetson**	**13**
1	**Southern California**	**8**
4	Virginia Tech	3
1	**Southern California**	**13**
3	Loyola Marymount	5
3	**Loyola Marymount**	**6**
2	Cal State Fullerton	4
Fullerton Regional–Goodwin Field
4	Virginia Tech	6
2	**Cal State Fullerton**	**8**	2	**Cal State Fullerton**	**5**
3	Loyola Marymount	2

Regional finals
1	**Georgia Tech**	**16**	—
3	Stetson	11	—
1	**Southern California**	**8**	—
2	Cal State Fullerton	3	—

Super regionals
3	Georgia Tech	2	3	—
**Southern California**	**7**	**6**	—

=== Clemson Super Regional ===
First round	Second round
1	**Clemson**	**4**
4	Middle Tennessee	0
1	**Clemson**	**9**
3	Illinois	3
3	**Illinois**	**3**
2	Old Dominion	1
Clemson Regional–Doug Kingsmore Stadium
4	**Middle Tennessee**	**6**
2	Old Dominion	5	4	**Middle Tennessee**	**4**
3	Illinois	3
1	**Mississippi State**	**9**
4	South Alabama	2
1	**Mississippi State**	**8**
3	Notre Dame	1
3	**Notre Dame**	**8**
2	Tulane	4
Starkville Regional–Dudy Noble Field
4	South Alabama	3
2	**Tulane**	**4**	2	Tulane	6
3	**Notre Dame**	**10**

Regional finals
1	**Clemson**	**21**	—
4	Middle Tennessee	3	—
1	**Mississippi State**	0	**10**
3	Notre Dame	**7**	9

Super regionals
4	**Clemson**	**11**	**9**	—
Mississippi State	4	4	—

=== Houston Super Regional ===
First round	Second round
1	**Houston**	**7**
4	Princeton	6
1	**Houston**	**5**
2	Rice	2
3	Texas Tech	2
2	**Rice**	**5**
Houston Regional–Cougar Field
4	Princeton	1
3	**Texas Tech**	**10**	3	Texas Tech	4
2	**Rice**	**11**
1	Baylor	0
4	**SW Texas State**	**6**
4	SW Texas State	2
3	**San Jose State**	**5**
3	**San Jose State**	**4**
2	Florida	1
Waco Regional–Baylor Ballpark
1	Baylor	1
2	**Florida**	**10**	2	**Florida**	**14**
4	SW Texas State	0

Regional finals
1	**Houston**	4	**9**
2	Rice	**5**	5
3	**San Jose State**	7	**2**
2	Florida	**8**	1

Super regionals
5	Houston	3	**5**^{14}	2
**San Jose State**	**5**	2	**3**

=== Tallahassee Super Regional ===
First round	Second round
1	**Florida State**	**6**
4	Bethune-Cookman	3
1	Florida State	8
2	**UCF**	**9**
3	Evansville	1
2	**UCF**	**4**
Tallahassee Regional–Dick Howser Stadium
4	Bethune-Cookman	5
3	**Evansville**	**6**	3	Evansville	2
1	**Florida State**	**11**
1	**Miami (FL)**	**19**
4	Wagner	5
1	**Miami (FL)**	**11**
2	Florida Atlantic	5
3	FIU	6
2	**Florida Atlantic**	**14**
Coral Gables Regional–Mark Light Field
4	Wagner	1
3	**FIU**	**10**	3	**FIU**	**7**
2	Florida Atlantic	0

Regional finals
2	UCF	1	1
1	**Florida State**	**6**	**8**
1	**Miami (FL)**	**14**	—
3	FIU	4	—

Super regionals
6	**Florida State**	**9**	5	**6**
Miami (FL)	2	**7**	1

=== Austin Super Regional ===
Hosted by Texas at Disch–Falk Field in Austin, Texas

First round	Second round
1	**Arizona State**	**15**
4	Miami (OH)	7
1	**Arizona State**	**3**
2	Texas	1
3	Creighton	4
2	**Texas**	**5**
Tempe Regional–Packard Stadium
4	**Miami (OH)**	**6**
3	Creighton	3	4	Miami (OH)	1
2	**Texas**	**11**
1	**Rutgers**	**4**
4	Army	3
1	Rutgers	3
2	**North Carolina**	**9**
3	Penn State	5
2	**North Carolina**	**14**
Montclair Regional–Yogi Berra Stadium
4	Army	1
3	**Penn State**	**3**	3	**Penn State**	**6**
1	Rutgers	5

Regional finals
1	Arizona State	4	7
2	**Texas**	**6**	**9**
2	North Carolina	5	3
3	**Penn State**	**6**	**10**

Super regionals
**Texas**	**7**	**10**	—
Penn State	3	0	—

=== Palo Alto Super Regional ===
First round	Second round
1	**Stanford**	**5**
4	Fresno State	1
1	**Stanford**	**8**
2	Alabama	6
3	Nevada	2
2	**Alabama**	**8**
Palo Alto Regional–Sunken Diamond
4	Fresno State	5
3	**Nevada**	**13**	3	Nevada	5
2	**Alabama**	**6**
1	**Nebraska**	**2**
4	Butler	1
1	**Nebraska**	**4**
2	Minnesota	1
3	Wichita State	7
2	**Minnesota**	**10**
Minneapolis Regional–Siebert Field
4	Butler	5
3	**Wichita State**	**15**	3	**Wichita State**	**5**
2	Minnesota	1

Regional finals
1	**Stanford**	9	**16**
2	Alabama	**14**	6
1	**Nebraska**	**8**	—
3	Wichita State	1	—

Super regionals
8	**Stanford**	3	**7**	**5**
Nebraska	**7**	1	3

== Notes on tournament field ==
- Army, Butler, and Wagner were making their first NCAA tournament appearance.

== College World Series ==
=== Participants ===
School	Conference	Record (conference)	Head coach	CWS appearances	Best CWS finish	CWS record Not including this year
Clemson	ACC	50–16 (17–7)	Jack Leggett	8 (last: 1996)	3rd (1996)	6–16
Florida State	ACC	51–17 (15–9)	Mike Martin	17 (last: 1999)	2nd (1970, 1986, 1999)	23–34
Louisiana–Lafayette	Sun Belt	47–18 (20–10)	Tony Robichaux	0 (last: none)	none	0–0
LSU	SEC	48–17 (19–10)	Skip Bertman	10 (last: 1998)	1st (1991, 1993, 1996, 1997)	25–13
San Jose State	WAC	41–22 (n/a)	Sam Piraro	0 (last: none)	none	0–0
Stanford	Pac-10	47–15 (17–7)	Mark Marquess	11 (last: 1999)	1st (1987, 1988)	25–20
Texas	Big 12	46–19 (19–10)	Augie Garrido	27 (last: 1993)	1st (1949, 1950, 1975, 1983)	64–47
USC	Pac-10	43–18 (16–8)	Mike Gillespie	19 (last: 1998)	1st (1948, 1958, 1961, 1963, 1968, 1970, 1971, 1972, 1973, 1974, 1978, 1998)	72–22

=== Results ===
==== Bracket ====
First round
Louisiana–Lafayette	4
8	**Stanford**	**6**
4	**Clemson**	**10**
San Jose State	6
**Louisiana–Lafayette**	**6**
San Jose State	3
2	**LSU**	**13**
Texas	5
**USC**	**6**
6	Florida State	4
Texas	2
6	**Florida State**	**6**

Second round
8	**Stanford**	**10**
4	Clemson	4
**Louisiana–Lafayette**	**5**
4	Clemson	4
2	**LSU**	**10**
USC	4
6	**Florida State**	**3**
USC	2

Semifinals
8	**Stanford**	**19**	—
Louisiana–Lafayette	9	—
2	**LSU**	**6**	—
6	Florida State	3	—

Final
8	Stanford	5
2	**LSU**	**6**

==== Game results ====
Date	Game	Winner	Score	Loser	Notes
June 9	Game 1	Clemson	10–6	San Jose State	
June 9	Game 2	Stanford	6–4	Louisiana–Lafayette	
June 10	Game 3	USC	6–4	Florida State	
June 10	Game 4	LSU	13–5	Texas	
June 11	Game 5	Stanford	10–4	Clemson	
June 11	Game 6	Louisiana–Lafayette	6–3	San Jose State	San Jose State eliminated
June 12	Game 7	LSU	10–4	USC	
June 12	Game 8	Florida State	6–2	Texas	Texas eliminated
June 14	Game 9	Louisiana–Lafayette	5–4	Clemson	Clemson eliminated
June 14	Game 10	Florida State	3–2	USC	USC eliminated
June 15	Game 11	Stanford	19–9	Louisiana–Lafayette	Louisiana–Lafayette eliminated
June 15	Game 12	LSU	6–3	Florida State	Florida State eliminated
June 17	Final	LSU	6–5	Stanford	LSU wins CWS

=== All-Tournament Team ===
The following players were members of the College World Series All-Tournament Team.

Position	Player	School
P	**Trey Hodges (MOP)**	LSU
P	Jon McDonald	Florida State
C	Beau Craig	USC
1B	Craig Thompson	Stanford
2B	Mike Fontenot	LSU
3B	Blair Barbier	LSU
SS	Ryan Theriot	LSU
OF	Joe Borchard	Stanford
OF	Steven Feehan	Louisiana–Lafayette
OF	Edmund Muth	Stanford
DH	Brad Hawpe	LSU

=== Notable players ===
- Clemson:
- Florida State: Marshall McDougall
- LSU: Trey Hodges, Brian Tallet, Ryan Theriot, Mike Fontenot, Brad Hawpe, Brad Cresse, Ray Wright
- Louisiana–Lafayette: Scott Dohmann
- San Jose State:
- Stanford: Joe Borchard, Justin Wayne
- Texas: Beau Hale, Phil Seibel, Ryan Hubele, Tommy Nicholson, Todd West, Charlie Thames
- USC: Mark Prior, Anthony Reyes

== See also ==
- 2000 NCAA Division II baseball tournament
- 2000 NCAA Division III baseball tournament
- 2000 NAIA World Series
