= 2000 UCLA Bruins baseball team =

American college baseball season

2000 UCLA Bruins baseball

Pacific-10 regular season champions

Baton Rouge Super Regional vs. LSU, 0–2
- Conference: Pacific-10 Conference
- Record: 38–26 (17–7 Pac-10)
- Head coach: Gary Adams
- Home stadium: Jackie Robinson Stadium

2000 Pacific-10 Conference baseball standings
	Conf.				Overall
Team	W		L	PCT	W		L	PCT
No. 2 Stanford ‍†‍‍^{y}	17	–	7	.708	50	–	16	.758
No. 12 Arizona State ‍†‍‍^{y}	17	–	7	.708	44	–	15	.746
No. 16 UCLA ‍†‍‍^{y}	17	–	7	.708	38	–	26	.594
No. 5 Southern California ‍‍‍^{y}	16	–	8	.667	44	–	20	.688
California ‍‍‍	11	–	13	.458	25	–	28	.472
Oregon State ‍‍‍	9	–	15	.375	28	–	27	.509
Arizona ‍‍‍	8	–	16	.333	26	–	30	.464
Washington ‍‍‍	7	–	17	.292	26	–	30	.464
Washington State ‍‍‍	6	–	18	.250	20	–	36	.357
† – Conference champion y – Invited to the NCAA tournament As of June 19, 2000; Rankings from Collegiate Baseball

The 2000 UCLA Bruins baseball team represented the University of California, Los Angeles in the 2000 NCAA Division I baseball season. The team played their home games in Jackie Robinson Stadium. The Bruins finished the season with a 38–26 overall record. With a 17–7 conference record, UCLA shared the Pacific-10 Conference Championship with Arizona and Stanford. The team qualified for the 2000 NCAA Division I baseball tournament, and were seeded #1 in the Oklahoma City Regional. The Bruins beat Delaware and Oklahoma to reach the regional finals. UCLA again played the Oklahoma Sooners in the finals, and beat them 11–3 to advance to the Baton Rouge Super Regionals. The Bruins faced the LSU Tigers, who were the #1 seed from the Baton Rouge Regional. UCLA lost the first game of the series 2–8, and lost the second game 8–14. LSU went on to win the 2000 College World Series, and never lost a game in the entire tournament.

UCLA set the NCAA record for most players drafted from a university in a single season when 12 players were picked in the 2000 Major League Baseball draft.

== Schedule ==
2000 UCLA Bruins baseball game log: 38–26
Regular season: 35-24
February (7–8)

Date	Opponent	Rank	Site/stadium	Score	Win	Loss	Save	Attendance	Overall record	Pac-10 record
February 3	at Hawaii	No. 4	Rainbow Stadium	W 15–3	M. Kunes (1–0)	R. Ho (1–2)	None	2,145	1–0	–
February 4	at Hawaii	No. 4	Rainbow Stadium	W 10–3	J. Brandt (1–0)	R. Snider (1–2)	None	2,421	2–0	–
February 5	at Hawaii	No. 4	Rainbow Stadium	W 9–3	J. Karp (1–0)	C. Giannetti (0–2)	None	2,340	3–0	–
February 9	UC Santa Barbara	No. 4	Jackie Robinson Stadium	W 17–4	B. Roe (1–0)	B. Cain (2–1)	None	445	4–0	–
February 11	at UNLV	No. 4	Earl Wilson Stadium	L 5–21	J. Maruffi (1–1)	J. Brandt (1–1)	None	407	4–1	–
February 12	at UNLV	No. 4	Earl Wilson Stadium	W 10–1	J. Karp (2–0)	G. Pupo (0–1)	None	594	5–1	–
February 13	at UNLV	No. 4	Earl Wilson Stadium	W 6–5	R. Henkel (1–0)	L. Anderson (1–2)	C. Cislak (1)	581	6–1	–
February 15	at Loyola Marymount	No. 2	Page Stadium	L 4–5	B. Felton (2–0)	C. Cislak (0–1)	None	448	6–2	–
February 18	No. 9 North Carolina	No. 2	Jackie Robinson Stadium	L 13–17	B.J. Finnerty (1–0)	C. Cislak (0–2)	None	247	6–3	–
February 19	No. 9 North Carolina	No. 2	Jackie Robinson Stadium	L 4–6	E. Henderson (1–0)	J. Karp (2–1)	DePriest (2)	531	6–4	–
February 20	No. 9 North Carolina	No. 2	Jackie Robinson Stadium	L 11–12	S. Autrey (2–0)	R. Henkel (1–1)	None	348	6–5	–
February 22	Pepperdine	No. 15	Jackie Robinson Stadium	W 11–7	K. Jerkens (1–0)	G. Ramirez (0–2)	None	292	7–5	–
February 25	at No. 16 USC	No. 15	Dedeaux Field	L 7–10	M. Prior (3–1)	J. Brandt (1–2)	Montrenes (1)	634	7–6	–
February 26	at No. 16 USC	No. 15	Dedeaux Field	L 3–4	T. Petke (1–0)	B. Roe (1–1)	None	1,021	7–7	–
February 27	at No. 16 USC	No. 15	Dedeaux Field	Postponed						
February 29	at San Diego State	No. 24	Tony Gwynn Stadium	L 8–9	R. Shortell (2–0)	C. Cislak (0–3)	None	485	7–8	–

March (11–3)

Date	Opponent	Rank	Site/stadium	Score	Win	Loss	Save	Attendance	Overall record	Pac-10 record
March 1	at No. 17 Long Beach State	No. 24	Blair Field	L 1–6	J. Leuenberger (1–0)	J. Brandt (1–3)	None	1,025	7–9	–
March 7	at No. 7 Cal State Fullerton		Goodwin Field	L 5–17	J. Smith (3–1)	B. Roe (1–2)	None	717	7–10	–
March 8	San Diego		Jackie Robinson Stadium	Postponed						
March 10	Bradley		Jackie Robinson Stadium	W 14–4	R. Henkel (2–1)	D. Hoffman (0–2)	P. Diaz (1)	256	8–10	–
March 11	Bradley		Jackie Robinson Stadium	W 9–8	J. Brandt (2–3)	M. Baker (1–2)	None	352	9–10	–
March 12	Bradley		Jackie Robinson Stadium	W 12–4	B. Roe (2–2)	C. Hawkins (1–1)	None	397	10–10	–
March 14	San Diego State		Jackie Robinson Stadium	W 7–6	R. Carter (1–0)	R. Ring (1–2)	None	202	11–10	–
March 17	Harvard		Jackie Robinson Stadium	W 9–2	R. Henkel (3–1)	J. Nyweide (0–1)	None	275	12–10	–
March 18	Harvard		Jackie Robinson Stadium	W 5–4	J. Brandt (3–3)	D. Lennon (0–1)	None	536	13–10	–
March 18	Harvard		Jackie Robinson Stadium	W 10–3	B. Roe (3–2)	J. Birtwell (0–1)	R. Carter (1)	536	14–10	–
March 25	Washington		Jackie Robinson Stadium	W 2–1	R. Henkel (4–1)	M. Massingale (2–2)	None	429	15–10	1–0
March 26	Washington		Jackie Robinson Stadium	L 6–7	M. Gardner (1–1)	J. Brandt (3–4)	None	545	15–11	1–1
March 27	Washington		Jackie Robinson Stadium	W 12–5	B. Roe (4–2)	J. Carlsen (3–1)	None	244	16–11	2–1
March 29	at San Diego		John Cunningham Stadium	W 11–9	J. Brandt (4–4)	M. Oseguera (0–2)	None	317	17–11	–
March 31	at Oregon State		Goss Stadium at Coleman Field	W 3–1	R. Henkel (5–1)	S. Nicholson (4–4)	None	824	18–11	3–1

April (11–9)

Date	Opponent	Rank	Site/stadium	Score	Win	Loss	Save	Attendance	Overall record	Pac-10 record
April 1	at Oregon State		Goss Stadium at Coleman Field	W 18–10	J. Karp (3–1)	T. Johnson (2–2)	None	1,152	19–11	4–1
April 2	at Oregon State		Goss Stadium at Coleman Field	W 9–5	R. Carter (2–0)	M. Newell (3–3)	None	955	20–11	5–1
April 4	Loyola Marymount	No. 25	Jackie Robinson Stadium	L 12–23	J. Abreu (1–0)	M. Kunes (1–1)	None	348	20–12	–
April 7	No. 10 USC	No. 25	Jackie Robinson Stadium	L 1–5	R. Currier (8–2)	R. Henkel (5–2)	None	885	20–13	5–2
April 8	No. 10 USC	No. 25	Jackie Robinson Stadium	W 15–5	J. Karp (4–1)	A. Reyes (3–4)	None	851	21–13	6–2
April 9	No. 10 USC	No. 25	Jackie Robinson Stadium	W 8–5	B. Roe (5–2)	M. Prior (7–3)	R. Carter (2)	1,403	22–13	7–2
April 11	at UC Santa Barbara	No. 15	Caesar Uyesaka Stadium	W 10–2	M. Kunes (2–1)	J. Gonzales (2–1)	None	212	23–13	–
April 14	Cal State Northridge	No. 15	Jackie Robinson Stadium	W 10–5	J. Karp (5–1)	A. Davidson (3–4)	R. Carter (3)	389	24–13	–
April 15	at Cal State Northridge	No. 15	Matador Field	L 2–7	B. Murphy (–)	B. Roe (5–3)	None	–	24–14	–
April 16	Cal State Northridge	No. 15	Jackie Robinson Stadium	L 9–12	S. Busby (1–0)	K. Jerkens (1–1)	None	531	24–15	–
April 18	at No. 22 USC	No. 19	Dedeaux Field	L 2–6	R. Flores (2–1)	C. Cislak (0–4)	T. Petke (3)	292	24–16	–
April 20	at No. 3 Arizona State	No. 19	Packard Stadium	L 8–10	T. Johnson (1–0)	J. Brandt (4–5)	E. Doble (7)	3,011	24–17	7–3
April 21	at No. 3 Arizona State	No. 19	Packard Stadium	W 13–3	J. Karp (6–1)	C. Pennington (7–2)	None	3,194	25–17	8–3
April 22	at No. 3 Arizona State	No. 19	Packard Stadium	L 3–18	J. Liebeck (1–0)	B. Roe (5–4)	None	3,719	25–18	8–4
April 24	San Diego	No. 28	Jackie Robinson Stadium	L 1–10	K. Gray (3–2)	C. Cislak (0–5)	None	215	25–19	–
April 25	No. 17 Cal State Fullerton	No. 28	Jackie Robinson Stadium	L 3–8	R. Corona (2–3)	M. Kunes (2–2)	None	341	25–20	–
April 28	at Washington State	No. 28	Bailey–Brayton Field	W 14–10	K. Jerkens (2–1)	L. McTavish (0–1)	None	472	26–20	9–4
April 29	at Washington State	No. 28	Bailey–Brayton Field	W 13–2	J. Karp (7–1)	T. Meldahl (2–6)	M. Kunes (1)	587	27–20	10–4
April 30	at Washington State	No. 28	Bailey–Brayton Field	W 14–1	B. Roe (6–4)	R. Rivard (0–5)	None	436	28–20	11–4

May (7–4)

Date	Opponent	Rank	Site/stadium	Score	Win	Loss	Save	Attendance	Overall record	Pac-10 record
May 2	at Pepperdine	No. 27	Eddy D. Field Stadium	L 6–7	N. Lowry (5–2)	S. Arrasmith (0–1)	D. Katz (4)	227	28–21	–
May 5	California	No. 27	Jackie Robinson Stadium	L 7–13	D. Cash (8–4)	R. Carter (2–1)	None	435	28–22	11–5
May 6	California	No. 27	Jackie Robinson Stadium	W 18–7	J. Karp (8–1)	J. Shirley (2–4)	P. Diaz (2)	463	29–22	12–5
May 7	California	No. 27	Jackie Robinson Stadium	W 8–7	J. Brandt (5–5)	T. Hutchinson (4–4)	None	552	30–22	13–5
May 9	Long Beach State	No. 29	Jackie Robinson Stadium	W 17–6	M. Kunes (3–2)	C. Bentz (0–2)	None	266	31–22	–
May 13	Arizona	No. 29	Jackie Robinson Stadium	W 5–3	J. Karp (9–1)	B. Diggins (9–4)	R. Carter (4)	581	32–22	14–5
May 14	Arizona	No. 29	Jackie Robinson Stadium	W 10–0	R. Henkel (6–2)	R. Shabansky (3–5)	None	507	33–22	15–5
May 15	Arizona	No. 22	Jackie Robinson Stadium	W 8–5	J. Brandt (6–5)	M. Meyer (1–3)	None	448	34–22	16–5
May 19	at No. 2 Stanford	No. 22	Sunken Diamond	W 10–9	J. Brandt (7–5)	J. Bruksch (4–4)	None	4,020	35–22	17–5
May 20	at No. 2 Stanford	No. 22	Sunken Diamond	L 3–19	J. Wayne (12–3)	R. Henkel (6–3)	None	2,537	35–23	17–6
May 21	at No. 2 Stanford	No. 22	Sunken Diamond	L 11–17	T. Cunningham (5–1)	B. Roe (6–5)	None	2,601	35–24	17–7

Postseason: 3–2
Oklahoma City Regional (3–0)

Date	Opponent	Seed/Rank	Site/stadium	Score	Win	Loss	Save	Attendance	Overall record	NCAAT Record
May 26	vs. (4) Delaware	(1) No. 22	Southwestern Bell Bricktown Ball Park	W 13–12	B. Roe (7–5)	V. Sage (4–3)	None	2,584	36–24	1–0
May 27	vs. (2) No. 29 Oklahoma	(1) No. 22	Southwestern Bell Bricktown Ball Park	W 10–5	J. Karp (10–1)	L. Cuellar (3–3)	J. Brandt (1)	4,865	37–24	2–0
May 28	vs. (2) No. 29 Oklahoma	(1) No. 22	Southwestern Bell Bricktown Ball Park	W 11–3	R. Carter (3–1)	A. Mix (10–2)	None	4,144	38–24	3–0

Baton Rouge Super Regional (0–2)

Date	Opponent	Seed/Rank	Site/stadium	Score	Win	Loss	Save	Attendance	Overall record	NCAAT Record	
63	June 2	at (2) No. 4 LSU	No. 14	Alex Box Stadium	L 2–8	B. Tallet (14–3)	R. Henkel (6–4)	None	7,624	38–25	3–1
64	June 3	at (2) No. 4 LSU	No. 14	Alex Box Stadium	L 8–14	B. Brian (6–2)	J. Karp (10–2)	W. Guidry (7)	7,667	38–26	3–2

== UCLA Bruins in the 2000 MLB draft ==
The following members of the UCLA Bruins baseball program were drafted in the 2000 Major League Baseball draft.

Player	Position	Round	Overall	MLB team
Chase Utley	2B	1st	15th	Philadelphia Phillies
Rob Henkel		3rd	71st	Florida Marlins
Garrett Atkins		5th	137th	Colorado Rockies
Bill Scott		8th	231st	Milwaukee Brewers
Ryan Carter		8th	235th	Philadelphia Phillies
Forrest Johnson		13th	378th	Detroit Tigers
Charles Merricks		17th	497th	Colorado Rockies
Chad Cislak		19th	576th	Cleveland Indians
Nick Lyon		20th	586th	Tampa Bay Devil Rays
Ryan Hamill		25th	743rd	St. Louis Cardinals
Brian Baron		46th	1348th	Minnesota Twins
Freddie Mitchell		50th	1441st	Chicago White Sox

== Notes ==
- May 23, 2000 – Former baseball coach Art Reichle died at 86. He played football, rugby and baseball at UCLA from 1934 to 1936 and coached for more than 30 years. His players included Jackie Robinson and Chris Chambliss.
