= Sam Piraro =

American baseball coach (born 1951)

Biographical details
- Born: December 22, 1951 (age 74); San Jose, California, U.S.

Playing career

Baseball
- 1971–1972: San Jose State
- Position: Infielder

Coaching career (HC unless noted)
- 1974–1976: San Jose State (JV)
- 1977–1979: San Jose State (asst.)
- 1980–1986: Mission CC
- 1987–2002, 2004–2012: San Jose State
- 2015–2018: Willow Glen HS

Head coaching record
- Overall: 805–633–6 (.560) (college); 80–35 (.696) (high school)
- Tournaments: 5–6 (NCAA) →0–2 (College World Series)

Accomplishments and honors

Championships
- 2× WAC regular season (2000, 2009); WAC West Division (1997)

Awards
- 4× WAC Coach of the Year (1997, 2000, 2008, 2009)

Samuel Joseph Piraro (born December 22, 1951) is an American baseball coach who was head coach at San Jose State from 1987 to 2002 and again from 2004 to 2012. Piraro led San Jose State to its first College World Series appearance in 2000.

== Head coaching record ==
=== Junior College ===
Record table
| Season | Team | Overall | Conference | Standing | Postseason |
|---|---|---|---|---|---|
Mission College Saints (Coast Conference) (1980–1986)
| 1980 | Mission College | 24-11 | 13-8 | 2nd | state playoffs |
| 1981 | Mission College | 31-8 | 18-6 | 1st | Division-II state champions |
| 1982 | Mission College | 24-13 | 15-9 | T-2nd | state playoffs (0-1) |
| 1983 | Mission College | 30-8 | 17-4 | 1st | Division-II state champions |
| 1984 | Mission College | 21-13-1 | 14-7 | 1st | state playoffs (1-1) |
| 1985 | Mission College | 33-7-1 | 19-2 | 1st | state playoffs (5th) |
| 1986 | Mission College | 27-10-1 | 16-5 | 2nd | regional playoffs |
| Mission College: | | .731 | | | |
| Total: | | .731 | | | |
National champion Postseason invitational champion Conference regular season champion Conference regular season and conference tournament champion Division regular season champion Division regular season and conference tournament champion Conference tournament champion

=== College ===
Record table
| Season | Team | Overall | Conference | Standing | Postseason |
|---|---|---|---|---|---|
San Jose State Spartans (Pacific Coast Athletic Association/Big West Conference) (1987–1996)
| 1987 | San Jose State | 31–28 | 8–13 | 6th | |
| 1988 | San Jose State | 31–30 | 9–11 | 4th | |
| 1989 | San Jose State | 40–19 | 11–10 | T–3rd | |
| 1990 | San Jose State | 43–17 | 9–12 | 7th | |
| 1991 | San Jose State | 25–30 | 7–14 | 7th | |
| 1992 | San Jose State | 32–21–1 | 12–12 | 5th | |
| 1993 | San Jose State | 34–19 | 11–10 | 3rd | |
| 1994 | San Jose State | 29–26 | 9–12 | 4th | |
| 1995 | San Jose State | 21–33–1 | 5–16 | T–7th | |
| 1996 | San Jose State | 28–28 | 7–14 | 7th | |
| San Jose State (PCAA/Big West): | | 314–251–2 (.556) | 88–124 (.415) | | |
San Jose State Spartans (Western Athletic Conference) (1997–2002)
| 1997 | San Jose State | 38–21 | 20–10 | 1st (West) | |
| 1998 | San Jose State | 31–23 | 13–17 | 3rd (West) | |
| 1999 | San Jose State | 30–26–1 | 16–11 | 3rd | |
| 2000 | San Jose State | 41–24 | 19–11 | T–1st | College World Series |
| 2001 | San Jose State | 37–22–1 | 21–15 | T–3rd | |
| 2002 | San Jose State | 45–17 | 21–9 | 2nd | NCAA Super Regional |
San Jose State Spartans (Western Athletic Conference) (2004–2012)
| 2004 | San Jose State | 23–31–1 | 11–19 | 5th | |
| 2005 | San Jose State | 28–28–1 | 13–17 | 5th | |
| 2006 | San Jose State | 33–26 | 12–12 | 3rd | |
| 2007 | San Jose State | 34–26 | 11–13 | T–4th | |
| 2008 | San Jose State | 31–25 | 17–14 | 4th | |
| 2009 | San Jose State | 41–20 | 15–7 | 1st | |
| 2010 | San Jose State | 23–37 | 9–15 | 6th | |
| 2011 | San Jose State | 35–26 | 11–13 | 5th | |
| 2012 | San Jose State | 22–29 | 5–13 | 7th | |
| San Jose State (WAC): | | 492–381–4 (.563) | 214–196 (.522) | | |
| San Jose State (total): | | 805–633–6 (.560) | 302–320 (.486) | | |
| Total: | | 805–633–6 (.560) | | | |
National champion Postseason invitational champion Conference regular season champion Conference regular season and conference tournament champion Division regular season champion Division regular season and conference tournament champion Conference tournament champion

=== High school ===
Record table
| Season | Team | Overall | Conference | Standing | Postseason |
|---|---|---|---|---|---|
Willow Glen Rams (Mount Hamilton Athletic League) (2015–2018)
| 2015 | Willow Glen | 16–14 | 8–6 | T–3rd | CIF CCS First Round |
| 2016 | Willow Glen | 20–10 | 7–7 | 5th | |
| 2017 | Willow Glen | 22–6 | 11–3 | T–1st | |
| 2018 | Willow Glen | 22–5 | 12–2 | 1st | |
| Willow Glen: | | 80–35 (.696) | 38–18 (.679) | | |
| Total: | | 80–35 (.696) | | | |
National champion Postseason invitational champion Conference regular season champion Conference regular season and conference tournament champion Division regular season champion Division regular season and conference tournament champion Conference tournament champion
