= Justin Wayne (baseball) =

American baseball player (born 1979)

- Pitcher
- Born: April 16, 1979 (age 47); Honolulu, Hawaii, U.S.
- Batted: Right Threw: Right

MLB debut
- September 3, 2002, for the Florida Marlins

Last MLB appearance
- July 25, 2004, for the Florida Marlins

MLB statistics
- Win–loss record: 5–8
- Earned run average: 6.13
- Strikeouts: 37
- Stats at Baseball Reference

Teams
- Florida Marlins (2002–2004)

Justin Morgan Wayne (born April 16, 1979) is an American former professional baseball pitcher, who played for the Florida Marlins of Major League Baseball for three seasons. In 2018, he was sentenced to two years in federal prison for insurance fraud.

== Amateur career ==
=== High school ===
Wayne attended Punahou School for high school. He played baseball, soccer, and cross country in high school. He was named to the All-Hawaii baseball team. Wayne was first drafted by the Boston Red Sox in the ninth round of the 1997 Major League Baseball draft but did not sign professionally.

==== College ====
In his freshman year for the Stanford Cardinal in 1998, Wayne's record as a relief pitcher was 6–0 with 6 saves. He was named to Collegiate Baseball's first freshman All-American team and The Sporting News' second-team Freshman All-American. That summer, he played summer baseball in the Cape Cod Baseball League for the Yarmouth-Dennis Red Sox. In his sophomore year, Wayne became a starting pitcher, and had a 10–0 record. His team lost in the semifinals of the College World Series. In 2000, Wayne was named co-Pac-10 Pitcher of the Year, with a 15–4 record and a 3.21 ERA, with Stanford reaching the finals of the College World Series. Wayne had 363 strikeouts while playing at Stanford, tied for second in program history. He is also in the top seven in wins, innings pitched, and winning percentage.

In 1998 and 1999, Wayne pitched for the U.S. collegiate national team. He had a 8.31 ERA in two games in 1998 and a 4.93 ERA in 7 games in 1999.

== Baseball career ==
=== Minor leagues ===
The Montreal Expos drafted Wayne with the fifth overall selection in the 2000 Major League Baseball draft, and he decided to forego his senior season at Stanford to start his professional baseball career. He received a $2.95 million signing bonus.

In 2001, he ended his first full minor league season at Double-A for the Harrisburg Senators, where he went 9–2 with a 2.62 ERA in 14 starts for a losing team (.465 winning percentage).

Pitching for the Portland Sea Dogs in 2002, he was voted the Eastern League's Pitcher of the Week for the week ending July 28 after tossing a complete game two-hit shutout against the Bowie Baysox, striking out six batters and not walking anybody in the 2–0 win. Pitching at Harrisurg, where he spent most of the season, he went 5–2 with a 2.37 ERA in 17 starts, giving up only 6.75 hits per 9 innings.

=== Major leagues ===
In July 2002, Wayne was traded by the Expos with Graeme Lloyd, Mike Mordecai, Donald Levinski, and Carl Pavano to the Florida Marlins for Cliff Floyd, Wilton Guerrero, Claudio Vargas, and cash.

Wayne debuted in the major leagues in 2002 at the age of 22. That season, over 23 2/3 innings, opposing hitters recorded a .244 batting average against. He held batters to a .154 batting average in tie games. From 2002 to 2004, he made 26 appearances (eight starts), compiling a 6.13 ERA with a 5–8 record, while recording 37 strikeouts and 36 walks over 61 2/3 innings pitched. With two outs and runners in scoring position, he held batters to an .048 average and .095 slugging percentage.

In April 2005, Wayne signed as a free agent with the Los Angeles Dodgers; he made four appearances for their Triple-A affiliate, the Las Vegas 51s, recording a 14.40 ERA. In May 2005, he signed as a free agent with the Kansas City Royals, but was released the following month before seeing any action.

=== Independent leagues ===
In August 2005, Wayne signed with the Newark Bears of the independent Atlantic League. In 10 appearances, Wayne pitched 18 innings, gave up 6 earned runs, walked 17, struck out 9, and had a 3.00 ERA with a 1–2 record. He held opponents to a .197 average.

== Personal life ==
Wayne is Jewish and majored in economics at Stanford. He finished his degree in 3 1/3 years. He was a National Honor Society member in high school.

His brother Hawkeye Wayne played baseball at Columbia University and signed with the Seattle Mariners after being drafted in the 11th round of the 1999 Major League Baseball draft. Their father, Jeffrey, played baseball at the University of Buffalo.

After retiring from professional baseball, he spent 3 1/2 years in finance before focusing on the medical industry. He has continued in this field and is now a Managing Partner and Chief Operating Officer of SMART Lab, located in Palm Beach Gardens, Florida.

In 2018, Wayne received a two-year federal prison sentence at a minimum-security federal prison camp at Maxwell Air Force Base in Montgomery, Alabama, for an insurance fraud scam involving Hawkeye, who received a 40-month sentence. Prosecutors said that a drug treatment center brought the Waynes' testing lab urine samples for testing that was not necessary, with the Waynes then charging insurance companies for the work and kicking back part of the proceeds to the drug treatment center.
