= Trey Hodges =

American baseball player

- Pitcher
- Born: June 29, 1978 (age 48); Houston, Texas, U.S.
- Batted: Right Threw: Right

Professional debut
- MLB: September 10, 2002, for the Atlanta Braves
- NPB: July 17, 2004, for the Hanshin Tigers

Last appearance
- MLB: September 27, 2003, for the Atlanta Braves
- NPB: September 10, 2004, for the Hanshin Tigers

MLB statistics
- Win–loss record: 5–3
- Earned run average: 4.77
- Strikeouts: 72

NPB statistics
- Win–loss record: 2–3
- Earned run average: 5.31
- Strikeouts: 29
- Stats at Baseball Reference

Teams
- Atlanta Braves (2002–2003); Hanshin Tigers (2004)

Trey Alan Hodges (born June 29, 1978) is an American former professional baseball pitcher. He played in Major League Baseball (MLB) for the Atlanta Braves and for the Hanshin Tigers of the Nippon Professional Baseball (NPB).

== Career ==
In 2008, Hodges pitched for the Double-A Frisco RoughRiders in the Texas Rangers organization. On February 27, 2009, he signed a contract with the independent Lancaster Barnstormers of the Atlantic League.

He last played professionally in 2009 with the independent Lancaster Barnstormers.

His brother, Kevin Hodges, also played in the major leagues and Nippon Professional Baseball. Trey pitched at LSU where he won a national title and MOP in the 2000 College World Series.
