= Knights Stadium =

Baseball stadium in Fort Mill, South Carolina

- The Castle
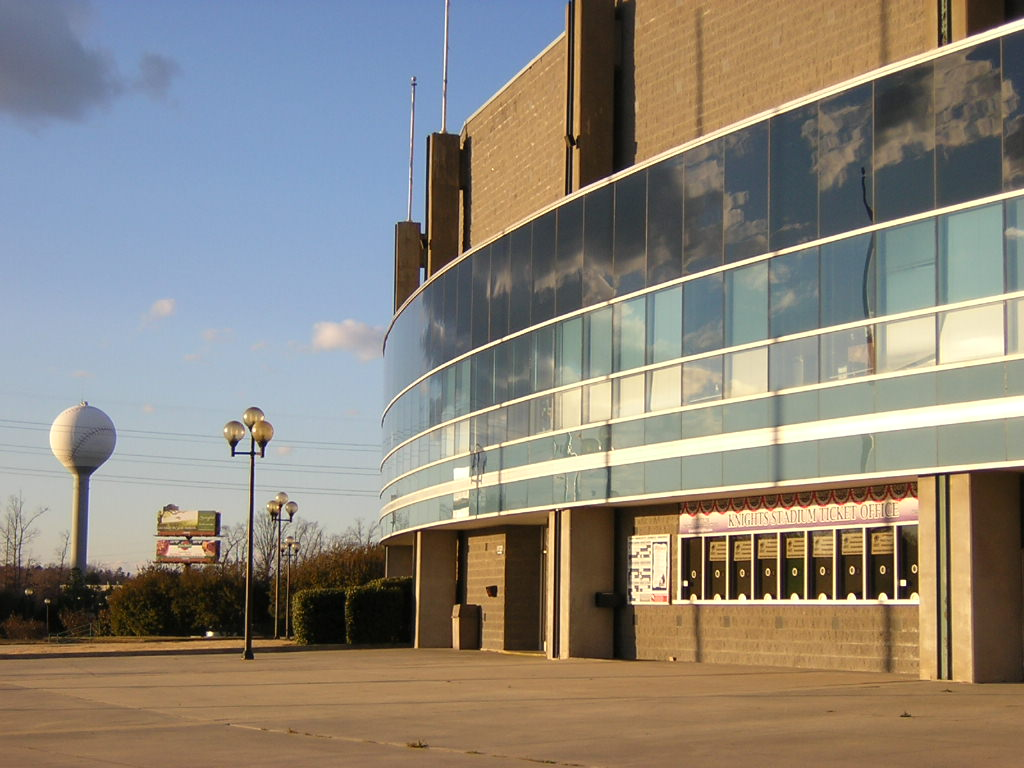
- Interactive map of Knights Stadium
- Former names: Knights Castle (1990-1999)
- Location: 2280 Deerfield Drive; Fort Mill, SC 29715
- Coordinates: 35°3′9″N 80°57′16″W
- Owner: York County
- Operator: Charlotte Knights Baseball, LLC
- Capacity: 10,002
- Surface: Grass
- Field size: Left Field — 326 feet Center Field — 400 feet Right Field — 325 feet

Construction
- Groundbreaking: February 20, 1989
- Opened: April 5, 1990
- Closed: September 2, 2013
- Demolished: Early 2015
- Cost: $12 million ($29.6 million in 2025 dollars)
- Architect: Odell Associates
- Structural engineer: Geiger Engineers
- General contractor: McDevitt & Street Construction Co.

Tenants
- Charlotte Knights (SL/IL) (1990–2013); Big South Conference baseball tournament (1997–1998); Atlantic Coast Conference baseball tournament (2000–2001)

Knights Stadium was a baseball stadium which served as the home of the International League's Charlotte Knights from 1990 to 2013 and had a capacity of 10,002. The park was located across the state line from Charlotte, North Carolina, in Fort Mill, South Carolina. The stadium closed at the end of the 2013 season and the Knights moved to Truist Field in uptown Charlotte for the 2014 season.

Knights Stadium was easily accessible from Interstate 77. Exit 88 (Gold Hill Road) connects the expressway with the former site of the stadium. A water tower painted to resemble a baseball on a tee, which can be seen from Interstate 77, was built near the stadium and still stands as of May 2025.

== History ==
The stadium was built to Major League Baseball specifications to be used should Charlotte land a major league team. It was designed to expand to 40,000 seats by completely or partially enclosing the outfield.

During construction, the Knights, then a member of the Class AA Southern League, played in an 8,000-seat temporary stadium known as Knights Castle. The present stadium was originally known as Knights Castle, but was renamed to Knights Stadium in the late 1990s. The stadium was still known among Charlotteans as The Castle.

On July 13, 1992, the ballpark hosted the Double-A All-Star Game in which a team of American League-affiliated All-Stars defeated a team of National League-affiliated All-Stars, 4–3, before 4,009 people in attendance.

The venue hosted the 1997 and 1998 Big South Conference baseball tournaments, won by UNC Greensboro and Liberty, respectively. It also hosted the 2000 and 2001 Atlantic Coast Conference baseball tournaments, won by Georgia Tech and Wake Forest, respectively.

On July 4, 2007, a franchise record 15,427 fans attended the game between the Knights and the Durham Bulls. This would be the exception rather than the norm for much of the new millennium, which saw sagging attendance. The stadium was located 20 minutes south of Charlotte, and many fans were reluctant to brave traffic on Interstate 77 to get there.

The stadium hosted its last Knights game on September 2, 2013, a 4–0 Knights victory over the Gwinnett Braves. After the game, several longtime employees dug up home plate and each of the bases and presented them to team mascot Homer the Dragon. Homer then saluted Knights Stadium one last time, and boarded a helicopter bound for Uptown Charlotte and BB&T Ballpark. In June 2014, York County sold the land to Cato Corporation, a Charlotte-based retailer of women's fashions and accessories. The contract Cato signed permits them to use the land for any industrial, commercial or residential purpose. The stadium was demolished in early 2015.

Events and tenants
| Preceded by Knights Castle | Home of the Charlotte Knights; 1990 – 2013 | Succeeded by BB&T Ballpark |
