= Klein Field at Sunken Diamond =

Baseball park in Stanford, California

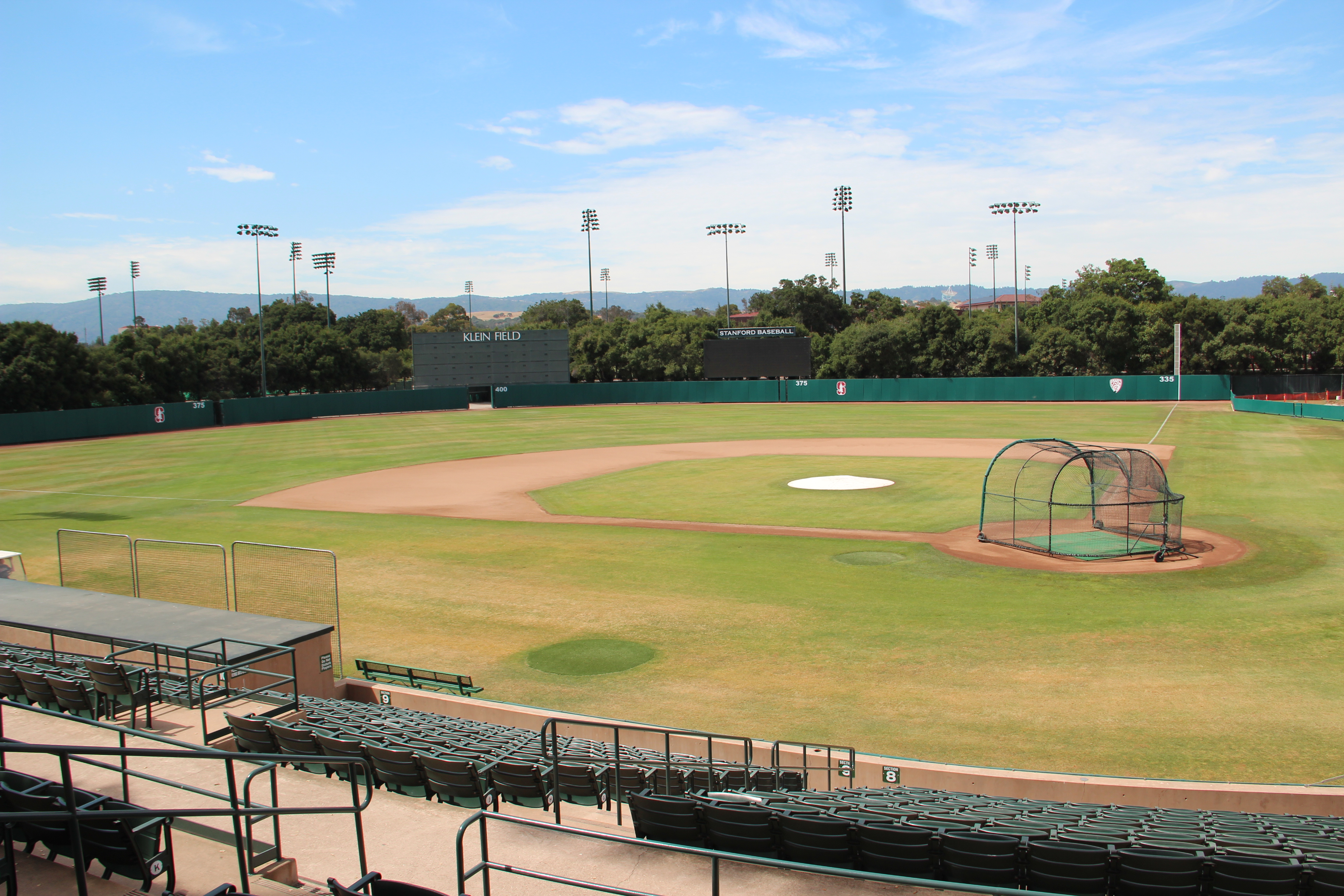
- The field in July 2015

- Location in the United States Location in California
- Interactive map of Klein Field at Sunken Diamond
- Former names: Sunken Diamond (1931–2008)
- Location: Stanford University; Stanford, California, U.S.
- Coordinates: 37.432°N 122.159°W
- Owner: Stanford University
- Operator: Stanford University
- Capacity: 4,000
- Surface: Natural grass
- Field size: Left Field: 335 feet (102 m); Center: 400 feet (122 m); Right Field: 335 feet (102 m)

Construction
- Opened: 1931; 95 years ago

Tenants
- Stanford Cardinal (NCAA ACC DI ACC); 1931–present

Klein Field at Sunken Diamond is a college baseball park on the west coast of the United States, located on the campus of Stanford University in Stanford, California. It is the home field of the Stanford Cardinal of the ACC Conference.

The stadium was built 95 years ago in 1931 and has a seating capacity of 4,000. When the adjacent football stadium was originally built in 1921, dirt was excavated from the site of the future baseball stadium, which created a "sunken" field a decade later. Originally just known simply as Sunken Diamond, the field was renamed in 2008 to honor Stanford athlete and donor Bud Klein (1927–2011) and his family.

In 2012, college baseball writer Eric Sorenson ranked the facility as the fourth best setting in Division I baseball. In 2013, the Cardinal ranked 39th among Division I baseball programs in attendance, averaging 1,747 per home game. The playing field at Sunken Diamond has an unorthodox alignment, with the batter and catcher facing south. The recommended orientation of a baseball diamond is east-northeast.

== See also ==
- List of NCAA Division I baseball venues
