= 2000 NCAA Division I baseball season =

Baseball season

- Number of teams: 281

NCAA tournament

College World Series
- Champions: LSU (5th title)
- Runners-up: Stanford (12th CWS Appearance)
- Winning coach: Skip Bertman (5th title)
- MOP: Trey Hodges (LSU)

Seasons
- ← 1999 2001 →

The 2000 NCAA Division I baseball season, play of college baseball in the United States organized by the National Collegiate Athletic Association (NCAA) began in the spring of 2000. The season progressed through the regular season and concluded with the 2000 College World Series. The College World Series, held for the fifty fourth time in 2000, consisted of one team from each of eight super regional competitions and was held in Omaha, Nebraska, at Johnny Rosenblatt Stadium as a double-elimination tournament. LSU claimed the championship for the fifth time.

== Realignment ==
- The Metro Atlantic Athletic Conference dissolved its divisions.
- Sacred Heart joined the Northeast Conference from NCAA Division II, joining the North Division. Fairleigh Dickinson moved to the South Division to give each division 5 teams.

== Conference winners ==
This is a partial list of conference champions from the 2000 season. The NCAA sponsored regional and super regional competitions to determine the College World Series participants. Each of the sixteen regionals consisted of four teams competing in double-elimination tournaments, with the winners advancing to eight best of three Super Regionals. The winners of each Super Regional advanced to Omaha. 29 teams earned automatic bids by winning their conference championship while 35 teams earned at-large selections.

Conference	Regular season winner	Conference Tournament	Tournament Venue • City	Tournament Winner
America East Conference	Delaware	2000 America East Conference baseball tournament	Frawley Stadium • Wilmington, DE	Delaware
Atlantic Coast Conference	Georgia Tech	2000 Atlantic Coast Conference baseball tournament	Knights Stadium • Fort Mill, SC	Georgia Tech
Big 12 Conference	Baylor	2000 Big 12 Conference baseball tournament	AT&T Bricktown Ballpark • Oklahoma City, OK	Nebraska
Big East Conference	Rutgers	2000 Big East Conference baseball tournament	Commerce Bank Ballpark • Bridgewater, NJ	Rutgers
Big South Conference	Liberty	2000 Big South Conference baseball tournament	Charles Watson Stadium • Conway, SC	Liberty
Big Ten Conference	Minnesota	2000 Big Ten Conference baseball tournament	Siebert Field • Minneapolis, MN	Illinois
Big West Conference	Cal State Fullerton/Nevada	No tournament		
Colonial Athletic Association	Old Dominion/East Carolina	2000 Colonial Athletic Association baseball tournament	Coy Tillett Sr. Memorial Field • Manteo, NC	East Carolina
Conference USA	Houston	2000 Conference USA baseball tournament	Florida Power Park • St. Petersburg, FL	Houston
Ivy League	Gehrig - Princeton; Rolfe - Dartmouth	2000 Ivy League Baseball Championship Series	Bill Clarke Field • Princeton, NJ	Princeton
Metro Atlantic Athletic Conference	Iona	2000 Metro Atlantic Athletic Conference baseball tournament	Dutchess Stadium • Wappingers Falls, NY	Marist
Mid-American Conference	East - Kent State; West - Central Michigan	2000 Mid-American Conference baseball tournament	Gene Michael Field • Kent, OH	Miami (OH)
Midwestern Collegiate Conference	Milwaukee	2000 Midwestern Collegiate Conference baseball tournament	Nischwitz Stadium • Dayton, OH	Butler
Mid-Continent Conference	Oral Roberts	2000 Mid-Continent Conference baseball tournament	J. L. Johnson Stadium • Tulsa, OK	Oral Roberts
Northeast Conference	North - Long Island; South - UMBC	2000 Northeast Conference baseball tournament	The Sandcastle • Atlantic City, NJ	Wagner
Pacific-10 Conference	Arizona State/Stanford/UCLA	No tournament		
Patriot League	Navy	2000 Patriot League baseball tournament	Max Bishop Stadium • Annapolis, MD	Army
Southeastern Conference	Eastern - South Carolina; Western - LSU	2000 Southeastern Conference baseball tournament	Hoover Metropolitan Stadium • Hoover, AL	LSU
Southern Conference	Georgia Southern	2000 Southern Conference baseball tournament	Joseph P. Riley Jr. Park • Charleston, SC	Georgia Southern
Southland Conference	McNeese State	2000 Southland Conference baseball tournament	Warhawk Field • Monroe, LA	Southwest Texas State
Trans America Athletic Conference	UCF	2000 Trans America Athletic Conference baseball tournament	Alexander Brest Field • Jacksonville, FL	Stetson
West Coast Conference	West - Pepperdine; Coast - Loyola Marymount	2000 West Coast Conference Baseball Championship Series	George C. Page Stadium • Los Angeles, CA	Loyola Marymount

== Conference standings ==
The following is an incomplete list of conference standings:

2000 Atlantic Coast Conference baseball standings
	Conf.				Overall
Team	W		L	PCT	W		L	PCT
No. 10 Georgia Tech ‍†‍‡‍^{y}	18	–	6	.750	50	–	16	.758
No. 6 Clemson ‍‍‍^{y}	17	–	7	.708	51	–	18	.739
No. 3 Florida State ‍‍‍^{y}	15	–	9	.625	53	–	19	.736
No. 20 Wake Forest ‍‍‍^{y}	14	–	10	.583	41	–	20	.672
No. 21 North Carolina ‍‍‍^{y}	12	–	12	.500	46	–	17	.730
NC State ‍‍‍	10	–	14	.417	30	–	28	.517
Virginia ‍‍‍	10	–	14	.417	26	–	31	.456
Maryland ‍‍‍	5	–	17	.227	24	–	33	.421
Duke ‍‍‍	5	–	19	.208	17	–	41	.293
† – Conference champion ‡ – Tournament champion y – Invited to the NCAA tournament As of June 30, 2000; Rankings from Collegiate Baseball

2000 Big 12 Conference baseball standings
	Conf.				Overall
Team	W		L	PCT	W		L	PCT
No. 18 Baylor ‍†‍‍^{y}	23	–	7	.767	45	–	17	.726
No. 11 Nebraska ‍‍‡‍^{y}	21	–	9	.700	51	–	17	.750
Oklahoma ‍‍‍^{y}	20	–	10	.667	41	–	23	.641
No. 7 Texas ‍‍‍^{y}	19	–	10	.655	46	–	21	.687
Texas Tech ‍‍‍^{y}	18	–	12	.600	36	–	26	.581
Oklahoma State ‍‍‍	14	–	13	.519	36	–	22	.621
Missouri ‍‍‍	13	–	14	.481	33	–	24	.579
Texas A&M ‍‍‍	11	–	19	.367	23	–	35	.397
Kansas ‍‍‍	10	–	20	.333	25	–	30	.455
Iowa State ‍‍‍	7	–	23	.233	19	–	37	.339
Kansas State ‍‍‍	5	–	24	.172	19	–	32	.373
† – Conference champion ‡ – Tournament champion y – Invited to the NCAA tournament As of June 30, 2000; Rankings from Collegiate Baseball

2000 Big East Conference baseball standings
	Conf.				Overall
Team	W		L	PCT	W		L	PCT
Rutgers ‍†‍‡‍^{y}	18	–	5	.783	40	–	18	.690
Notre Dame ‍‍‍^{y}	18	–	7	.720	46	–	18	.719
Seton Hall ‍‍‍^{y}	18	–	7	.720	40	–	18	.690
Connecticut ‍‍‍	14	–	9	.609	32	–	17	.653
Boston College ‍‍‍	12	–	11	.522	32	–	20	.615
Pittsburgh ‍‍‍	11	–	13	.458	31	–	24	.564
West Virginia ‍‍‍	10	–	12	.455	25	–	28	.472
St. John's ‍‍‍	8	–	15	.348	29	–	22	.569
Villanova ‍‍‍	8	–	15	.348	24	–	26	.480
Georgetown ‍‍‍	1	–	24	.040	13	–	43	.232
† – Conference champion ‡ – Tournament champion y – Invited to the NCAA tournament As of June 30, 2000; Rankings from Collegiate Baseball

2000 Big South Conference baseball standings
	Conf.						Overall
Team	W		L		T	PCT	W		L		T	PCT
Liberty ‍†‍‡‍^{y}	14	–	5	–	0	.737	36	–	23	–	0	.610
Charleston Southern ‍‍‍	14	–	7	–	0	.667	31	–	31	–	1	.500
Radford ‍‍‍	12	–	7	–	0	.632	28	–	24	–	0	.538
Coastal Carolina ‍‍‍	11	–	10	–	0	.524	34	–	24	–	0	.586
Elon ‍‍‍	11	–	10	–	0	.524	33	–	25	–	0	.569
Winthrop ‍‍‍	7	–	14	–	0	.333	30	–	33	–	0	.476
UNC Asheville ‍‍‍	7	–	14	–	0	.333	26	–	32	–	0	.448
High Point ‍‍‍	6	–	15	–	0	.286	22	–	36	–	1	.381
† – Conference champion ‡ – Tournament champion y – Invited to the NCAA tournament As of June 30, 2000; Rankings from Collegiate Baseball

2000 Big Ten Conference baseball standings
	Conf.				Overall
Team	W		L	PCT	W		L	PCT
Minnesota ‍†‍‍^{y}	20	–	8	.714	38	–	22	.633
No. 19 Penn State ‍‍‍^{y}	18	–	9	.667	41	–	17	.707
Purdue ‍‍‍	17	–	11	.607	35	–	23	.603
Illinois ‍‍‡‍^{y}	17	–	11	.607	41	–	21	.661
Ohio State ‍‍‍	15	–	13	.536	37	–	23	.617
Northwestern ‍‍‍	13	–	15	.464	30	–	27	.526
Iowa ‍‍‍	11	–	17	.393	19	–	35	.352
Michigan ‍‍‍	10	–	18	.357	20	–	32	.385
Michigan State ‍‍‍	9	–	18	.333	20	–	36	.357
Indiana ‍‍‍	9	–	19	.321	29	–	27	.518
x – Division champion ‡ – Tournament champion y – Invited to the NCAA tournament As of June 30, 2000; Rankings from Collegiate Baseball

2000 Colonial Athletic Association baseball standings
	Conf.						Overall
Team	W		L		T	PCT	W		L		T	PCT
Old Dominion ‍†‍‍^{y}	14	–	7	–	0	.667	33	–	24	–	1	.578
No. 29 East Carolina ‍†‍‡‍^{y}	14	–	7	–	0	.667	46	–	18	–	0	.719
UNC Wilmington ‍‍‍	13	–	8	–	0	.619	36	–	23	–	0	.610
James Madison ‍‍‍	12	–	9	–	0	.571	37	–	22	–	0	.627
VCU ‍‍‍	9	–	12	–	0	.429	39	–	22	–	0	.639
Richmond ‍‍‍	8	–	13	–	0	.381	25	–	29	–	0	.463
George Mason ‍‍‍	7	–	14	–	0	.333	21	–	34	–	1	.384
William & Mary ‍‍‍	7	–	14	–	0	.333	32	–	25	–	0	.561
† – Conference champion ‡ – Tournament champion y – Invited to the NCAA tournament As of June 30, 2000; Rankings from Collegiate Baseball

2000 Conference USA baseball standings
	Conf.						Overall
Team	W		L		T	PCT	W		L		T	PCT
No. 13 Houston ‍†‍‡‍^{y}	21	–	4	–	0	.840	48	–	18	–	0	.727
Tulane ‍‍‍^{y}	20	–	6	–	1	.759	38	–	22	–	1	.631
Southern Miss ‍‍‍	14	–	9	–	0	.609	32	–	26	–	0	.552
Charlotte ‍‍‍	15	–	11	–	0	.577	32	–	25	–	1	.560
South Florida ‍‍‍	14	–	13	–	0	.519	29	–	29	–	0	.500
Cincinnati ‍‍‍	11	–	16	–	0	.407	35	–	16	–	0	.686
UAB ‍‍‍	10	–	15	–	0	.400	28	–	32	–	0	.467
Louisville ‍‍‍	10	–	16	–	1	.389	17	–	37	–	1	.318
Memphis ‍‍‍	8	–	18	–	0	.308	15	–	37	–	0	.288
Saint Louis ‍‍‍	6	–	21	–	0	.222	19	–	34	–	0	.358
† – Conference champion ‡ – Tournament champion y – Invited to the NCAA tournament Rankings from Collegiate Baseball

2000 Ivy League baseball standings
	Conf.				Overall
Team	W		L	PCT	W		L	PCT
Lou Gehrig
Princeton ^{x}‍‍‡‍^{y}	13	–	7	.650	24	–	20	.545
Cornell ‍‍‍	11	–	9	.550	15	–	24	.385
Penn ‍‍‍	9	–	11	.450	20	–	21	.488
Columbia ‍‍‍	6	–	14	.300	11	–	34	.244
Red Rolfe
Dartmouth ^{x}‍‍‍	17	–	3	.850	29	–	14	.674
Brown ‍‍‍	11	–	9	.550	23	–	24	.489
Harvard ‍‍‍	10	–	10	.500	18	–	25	.419
Yale ‍‍‍	3	–	17	.150	13	–	31	.295
x – Division champion ‡ – Championship Series champion y – Invited to the NCAA tournament As of June 30, 2000; Rankings from Collegiate Baseball

2000 Metro Atlantic Athletic Conference baseball standings
	Conf.				Overall
Team	W		L	PCT	W		L	PCT
Iona ‍†‍‍	22	–	4	.846	31	–	13	.705
Le Moyne ‍‍‍	18	–	7	.720	32	–	15	.681
Fairfield ‍‍‍	17	–	8	.680	26	–	20	.565
Marist ‍‍‡‍^{y}	16	–	11	.593	32	–	18	.640
Rider ‍‍‍	13	–	12	.520	22	–	29	.431
Niagara ‍‍‍	13	–	13	.500	16	–	25	.390
Siena ‍‍‍	12	–	14	.462	15	–	32	.319
Manhattan ‍‍‍	10	–	16	.385	20	–	29	.408
Saint Peter's ‍‍‍	4	–	21	.160	8	–	41	.163
Canisius ‍‍‍	4	–	23	.148	9	–	33	.214
† – Conference champion ‡ – Tournament champion y – Invited to the NCAA tournament As of June 30, 2000; Rankings from Collegiate Baseball

2000 Mid-American Conference baseball standings
	Conf.						Overall
Team	W		L		T	PCT	W		L		T	PCT
East
Kent State ^{x}‍‍‍	20	–	6	–	0	.769	40	–	18	–	0	.690
Ohio ‍‍‍	18	–	10	–	0	.643	31	–	25	–	1	.553
Miami ‍‍‡‍^{y}	16	–	12	–	0	.571	40	–	23	–	0	.635
Bowling Green ‍‍‍	14	–	12	–	0	.538	29	–	24	–	1	.546
Akron ‍‍‍	12	–	15	–	0	.444	26	–	30	–	0	.464
Marshall ‍‍‍	7	–	20	–	0	.259	21	–	33	–	1	.391
West
Central Michigan ^{x}‍‍‍	18	–	8	–	0	.692	41	–	17	–	0	.707
Ball State ‍‍‍	18	–	8	–	0	.692	34	–	23	–	0	.596
Northern Illinois ‍‍‍	11	–	15	–	0	.423	24	–	33	–	0	.421
Western Michigan ‍‍‍	10	–	18	–	0	.357	26	–	27	–	0	.491
Toledo ‍‍‍	9	–	19	–	0	.321	21	–	33	–	0	.389
Eastern Michigan ‍‍‍	9	–	19	–	0	.321	20	–	36	–	0	.357
† – Conference champion ‡ – Tournament champion y – Invited to the NCAA tournament As of June 30, 2000; Rankings from Collegiate Baseball

2000 Mid-Continent Conference baseball standings
	Conf.						Overall
Team	W		L		T	PCT	W		L		T	PCT
Oral Roberts ‍†‍‡‍^{y}	26	–	1	–	0	.963	49	–	15	–	0	.766
Oakland ‍‍‍	17	–	9	–	0	.654	28	–	32	–	0	.467
Southern Utah ‍‍‍	16	–	11	–	0	.593	30	–	26	–	0	.536
Youngstown State ‍‍‍	13	–	13	–	0	.500	24	–	31	–	0	.436
Western Illinois ‍‍‍	12	–	15	–	0	.444	17	–	39	–	0	.304
Valparaiso ‍‍‍	10	–	17	–	0	.370	14	–	42	–	1	.254
Chicago State ‍‍‍	7	–	18	–	0	.280	17	–	30	–	0	.362
IUPUI ‍‍‍	4	–	21	–	0	.160	10	–	40	–	0	.200
‡ – Tournament champion y – Invited to the NCAA tournament As of June 30, 2000; Rankings from Collegiate Baseball

2000 Midwestern Collegiate Conference baseball standings
	Conf.				Overall
Team	W		L	PCT	W		L	PCT
Milwaukee ‍‍‍	12	–	6	.667	30	–	24	.556
UIC ‍‍‍	12	–	6	.667	33	–	26	.559
Cleveland State ‍‍‍	10	–	9	.526	23	–	33	.411
Butler ‍‍‡‍^{y}	8	–	8	.500	31	–	28	.525
Wright State ‍‍‍	8	–	12	.400	19	–	39	.328
Detroit ‍‍‍	5	–	13	.278	16	–	28	.364
‡ – Tournament champion y – Invited to the NCAA Tournament; As of June 30, 2000; Rankings from Collegiate Baseball

2000 Mountain West Conference baseball standings
	Conf.				Overall
Team	W		L	PCT	W		L	PCT
New Mexico ‍†‍‍	22	–	8	.733	35	–	21	.625
San Diego State ‍‍‡‍	17	–	12	.586	34	–	28	.548
BYU ‍‍‍	15	–	15	.500	29	–	29	.500
Utah ‍‍‍	15	–	15	.500	26	–	30	.464
UNLV ‍‍‍	14	–	16	.467	24	–	33	.421
Air Force ‍‍‍	6	–	23	.207	23	–	34	.404
† – Conference champion ‡ – Tournament champion y – Invited to the 2000 NCAA Division I baseball tournament As of June 30, 2000; Rankings from Collegiate Baseball

2000 Northeast Conference baseball standings
	Conf.						Overall
Team	W		L		T	PCT	W		L		T	PCT
North
Long Island ^{x}‍‍‍	14	–	8	–	0	.636	23	–	21	–	0	.523
Quinnipiac ‍‍‍	11	–	11	–	0	.500	16	–	21	–	0	.432
Central Connecticut ‍‍‍	9	–	11	–	0	.450	17	–	31	–	1	.357
St. Francis ‍‍‍	7	–	12	–	0	.368	11	–	24	–	0	.314
Sacred Heart ‍‍‍	6	–	16	–	0	.273	12	–	38	–	0	.240
South
UMBC ^{x}‍‍‍	16	–	6	–	0	.727	29	–	21	–	1	.578
Monmouth ‍‍‍	15	–	7	–	0	.682	25	–	27	–	0	.481
Wagner ‍‍‡‍^{y}	14	–	8	–	0	.636	24	–	30	–	1	.445
Fairleigh Dickinson ‍‍‍	10	–	11	–	0	.476	15	–	23	–	1	.397
Mount St. Mary's ‍‍‍	5	–	17	–	0	.227	17	–	34	–	0	.333
x – Division champion ‡ – Tournament champion y – Invited to the NCAA tournament Rankings from Collegiate Baseball

2000 Pacific-10 Conference baseball standings
	Conf.				Overall
Team	W		L	PCT	W		L	PCT
No. 2 Stanford ‍†‍‍^{y}	17	–	7	.708	50	–	16	.758
No. 12 Arizona State ‍†‍‍^{y}	17	–	7	.708	44	–	15	.746
No. 16 UCLA ‍†‍‍^{y}	17	–	7	.708	38	–	26	.594
No. 5 Southern California ‍‍‍^{y}	16	–	8	.667	44	–	20	.688
California ‍‍‍	11	–	13	.458	25	–	28	.472
Oregon State ‍‍‍	9	–	15	.375	28	–	27	.509
Arizona ‍‍‍	8	–	16	.333	26	–	30	.464
Washington ‍‍‍	7	–	17	.292	26	–	30	.464
Washington State ‍‍‍	6	–	18	.250	20	–	36	.357
† – Conference champion y – Invited to the NCAA tournament As of June 19, 2000; Rankings from Collegiate Baseball

2000 Patriot League baseball standings
	Conf.						Overall
Team	W		L		T	PCT	W		L		T	PCT
Navy ‍†‍‍	14	–	6	–	0	.700	24	–	20	–	1	.544
Bucknell ‍‍‍	12	–	8	–	0	.600	22	–	25	–	0	.468
Army ‍‍‡‍^{y}	10	–	8	–	0	.556	24	–	20	–	1	.544
Lehigh ‍‍‍	8	–	12	–	0	.400	21	–	22	–	0	.488
Holy Cross ‍‍‍	8	–	12	–	0	.400	13	–	27	–	1	.329
Lafayette ‍‍‍	6	–	12	–	0	.333	12	–	27	–	0	.308
‡ – Tournament champion y – Invited to the NCAA tournament As of June 30, 2000; Rankings from Collegiate Baseball

2000 Southeastern Conference baseball standings
	Conf.				Overall
Team	W		L	PCT	W		L	PCT
Eastern
No. 9 South Carolina ^{x}‍†‍‍^{y}	25	–	5	.833	53	–	8	.869
No. 17 Florida ‍‍‍^{y}	18	–	11	.621	44	–	23	.657
Georgia ‍‍‍	14	–	15	.483	32	–	26	.552
Kentucky ‍‍‍	12	–	16	.429	38	–	20	.655
Tennessee ‍‍‍	10	–	18	.357	40	–	23	.635
Vanderbilt ‍‍‍	5	–	24	.172	21	–	33	.389
Western
No. 1 LSU ^{x}‍‍‡‍^{y}	19	–	10	.655	52	–	17	.754
No. 15 Mississippi State ‍‍‍^{y}	17	–	10	.630	39	–	17	.696
No. 25 Auburn ‍‍‍^{y}	17	–	13	.567	41	–	20	.672
No. 27 Alabama ‍‍‍^{y}	16	–	14	.533	41	–	24	.631
Ole Miss ‍‍‍	12	–	17	.414	30	–	25	.545
Arkansas ‍‍‍	8	–	20	.286	24	–	30	.444
x – Division champion † – Conference champion ‡ – Tournament champion y – Invited to the NCAA tournament As of June 30, 2000; Rankings from Collegiate Baseball

2000 Southern Conference baseball standings
	Conf.				Overall
Team	W		L	PCT	W		L	PCT
Georgia Southern ‍†‍‡‍^{y}	23	–	7	.767	38	–	22	.633
The Citadel ‍†‍‍	23	–	7	.767	39	–	20	.661
UNC Greensboro ‍‍‍	20	–	9	.690	34	–	24	.586
Furman ‍‍‍	15	–	13	.536	27	–	31	.466
East Tennessee State ‍‍‍	15	–	15	.500	21	–	31	.404
College of Charleston ‍‍‍	14	–	15	.483	28	–	28	.500
Davidson ‍‍‍	14	–	15	.483	26	–	28	.481
Appalachian State ‍‍‍	11	–	17	.393	17	–	38	.309
VMI ‍‍‍	11	–	19	.367	19	–	30	.388
Western Carolina ‍‍‍	8	–	22	.267	15	–	38	.283
Wofford ‍‍‍	7	–	22	.241	16	–	38	.296
† – Conference champion ‡ – SoCon Tournament champion y – Invited to the NCAA tournament As of June 30, 2000; Rankings from Collegiate Baseball

2000 Southland Conference baseball standings
	Conf.				Overall
Team	W		L	PCT	W		L	PCT
McNeese State ‍†‍‍	20	–	7	.741	39	–	20	.661
Louisiana–Monroe ‍†‍‍	20	–	7	.741	41	–	22	.651
Southwest Texas State ‍‍‡‍^{y}	16	–	11	.593	34	–	29	.540
Nicholls State ‍‍‍	15	–	12	.556	27	–	29	.482
Northwestern State ‍‍‍	14	–	13	.519	30	–	26	.536
Sam Houston State ‍‍‍	14	–	13	.519	25	–	29	.463
Lamar ‍‍‍	11	–	16	.407	27	–	27	.500
Southeastern Louisiana ‍‍‍	10	–	17	.370	25	–	28	.472
Texas–Arlington ‍‍‍	9	–	18	.333	24	–	30	.444
Texas–San Antonio ‍‍‍	6	–	21	.222	17	–	37	.315
† – Conference champion ‡ – Tournament champion y – Invited to the NCAA tournament As of June 30, 2000; Rankings from Collegiate Baseball

2000 Trans America Athletic Conference baseball standings
	Conf.				Overall
Team	W		L	PCT	W		L	PCT
UCF ‍†‍‍^{y}	22	–	5	.815	43	–	19	.694
Florida Atlantic ‍‍‍^{y}	20	–	7	.741	43	–	19	.694
No. 23 Stetson ‍‍‡‍^{y}	20	–	7	.741	48	–	16	.750
Jacksonville ‍‍‍	16	–	11	.593	34	–	24	.586
Georgia State ‍‍‍	14	–	13	.519	31	–	28	.525
Campbell ‍‍‍	12	–	15	.444	31	–	25	.554
Troy ‍‍‍	11	–	16	.407	22	–	34	.393
Mercer ‍‍‍	8	–	19	.296	16	–	35	.314
Jacksonville State ‍‍‍	6	–	21	.222	23	–	32	.418
Samford ‍‍‍	6	–	21	.222	29	–	34	.460
† – Conference champion ‡ – Tournament champion y – Invited to the NCAA tournament As of June 30, 2000; Rankings from Collegiate Baseball

2000 West Coast Conference baseball standings
	Conf.						Overall
Team	W		L		T	PCT	W		L		T	PCT
West
Pepperdine ^{x}‍‍‍	22	–	8	–	0	.733	36	–	23	–	0	.610
San Diego ‍‍‍	14	–	16	–	0	.467	34	–	27	–	1	.556
Portland ‍‍‍	13	–	17	–	0	.433	24	–	28	–	0	.462
Saint Mary's ‍‍‍	10	–	20	–	0	.333	20	–	34	–	0	.370
Coast
#24 Loyola Marymount ^{x‡y} ‍‍‍	22	–	8	–	0	.733	40	–	19	–	0	.678
Gonzaga ‍‍‍	17	–	13	–	0	.567	28	–	25	–	0	.528
Santa Clara ‍‍‍	12	–	18	–	0	.400	22	–	37	–	0	.373
San Francisco ‍‍‍	10	–	20	–	0	.333	26	–	33	–	0	.441
x – Division champion ‡ – Championship Series champion y – Invited to the NCAA tournament As of June 30, 2000; Rankings from Collegiate Baseball

== College World Series ==
The 2000 season marked the fifty fourth NCAA baseball tournament, which culminated with the eight team College World Series. The College World Series was held in Omaha, Nebraska. The eight teams played a double-elimination format, with LSU claiming their fifth championship with a 6–5 win over Stanford in the final.

=== Bracket ===
First round
Louisiana–Lafayette	4
8	Stanford	6
4	Clemson	10
San Jose State	6
Louisiana–Lafayette	6
San Jose State	3
2	LSU	13
Texas	5
USC	6
6	Florida State	4
Texas	2
6	Florida State	6

Second round
8	Stanford	10
4	Clemson	4
Louisiana–Lafayette	5
4	Clemson	4
2	LSU	10
USC	4
6	Florida State	3
USC	2

Semifinals
8	Stanford	19	—
Louisiana–Lafayette	9	—
2	LSU	6	—
6	Florida State	3	—

Final
8	Stanford	5
2	LSU	6
