= LSU Tigers baseball statistical leaders =

The LSU Tigers baseball statistical leaders are individual statistical leaders of the LSU Tigers baseball program in various categories, including batting average, home runs, runs batted in, runs, hits, stolen bases, ERA, and Strikeouts. Within those areas, the lists identify single-game, single-season, and career leaders. The Tigers represent Louisiana State University in the NCAA's Southeastern Conference.

LSU began competing in intercollegiate baseball in 1893. These lists are updated through the end of the 2025 season.

== Batting Average ==
(Min. 2 at bats per team game)

Career (min. two seasons)
Rk	Player	AVG	Seasons
1	Todd Walker	.396 (310-for-783)	1992 1993 1994
2	Dylan Crews	.380 (286-for-753)	2021 2022 2023
3	Raph Rhymes	.373 (261-for-700)	2011 2012 2013
4	Sean Barker	.372 (129-for-347)	2001 2002
5	Eddy Furniss	.371 (352-for-948)	1995 1996 1997 1998
6	Russ Johnson	.367 (269-for-733)	1992 1993 1994
7	Bobby Mariano	.365 (76-for-208)	1979 1980
8	Wes Grisham	.362 (206-for-569)	1989 1990
9	Mark Cooper	.353 (101-for-286)	1983 1984
	Lyle Mouton	.353 (149-for-422)	1990 1991
	Ryan Patterson	.353 (284-for-805)	2003 2004 2005

Season
Rk	Player	AVG	Season
1	Raph Rhymes	.431 (100-for-232)	2012
2	Dylan Crews	.426 (110-for-258)	2023
3	Russ Johnson	.410 (96-for-234)	1994
4	Eddy Furniss	.403 (95-for-236)	1998
5	Todd Walker	.400 (100-for-250)	1992
6	Todd Walker	.395 (109-for-276)	1993
	Mike Nunnally	.395 (32-for-81)	1971
8	Todd Walker	.393 (101-for-257)	1994
	J.C. Holt	.393 (106-for-270)	2004
10	Gene Murphy	.390 (23-for-59)	1951

== Home Runs ==
Career
Rk	Player	HR	Seasons
1	Eddy Furniss	80	1995 1996 1997 1998
2	Brad Cresse	78	1997 1998 1999 2000
3	Jared Jones	64	2023 2024 2025
4	Trey McClure	59	1996 1997 1998 1999
5	Dylan Crews	58	2021 2022 2023
6	Blake Dean	56	2007 2008 2009 2010
7	Todd Walker	52	1992 1993 1994
8	Ryan Patterson	50	2003 2004 2005
9	Albert Belle	49	1985 1986 1987
10	Tommy White	48	2023 2024

Season
Rk	Player	HR	Season
1	Brandon Larson	40	1997
2	Brad Cresse	30	2000
3	Brad Cresse	29	1998
4	Eddy Furniss	28	1998
	Matt Clark	28	2008
	Jared Jones	28	2024
7	Trey McClure	27	1998
8	Eddy Furniss	26	1996
9	Gary Hymel	25	1991
10	Tommy White	24	2023
	Tommy White	24	2024

Single Game
Rk	Player	HR	Season	Opponent
1	Cade Arrambide	4	2026	Tennessee
2	Jack Walker	3	1936	Ole Miss
	Mark Cooper	3	1983	Ole Miss
	Eddy Furniss	3	1995	Arkansas
	Eddy Furniss	3	1996	Georgia
	Brandon Larson	3	1997	Duke
	Brandon Larson	3	1997	La. Tech
	Eddy Furniss	3	1998	Auburn
	Eric Hendrickson	3	1999	Ohio
	Brad Cresse	3	2000	UL-Monroe
	Zeph Zinsman	3	2001	Duquesne
	Quinn Stewart	3	2006	Stetson
	Leon Landry	3	2009	Mississippi State
	Jared Jones	3	2024	McNeese
	Jake Brown	3	2026	Sacramento State

== Runs Batted In ==
Career
Rk	Player	RBI	Seasons
1	Eddy Furniss	308	1995 1996 1997 1998
2	Blake Dean	260	2007 2008 2009 2010
3	Brad Cresse	257	1997 1998 1999 2000
4	Todd Walker	246	1992 1993 1994
5	Antoine Duplantis	216	2016 2017 2018 2019
6	Trey McClure	202	1996 1997 1998 1999
7	Blair Barbier	199	1997 1998 1999 2000
8	Clay Harris	185	2002 2003 2004 2005
9	Dylan Crews	184	2021 2022 2023
10	Chad Cooley	182	1993 1994 1995 1996

Season
Rk	Player	RBI	Season
1	Brandon Larson	118	1997
2	Brad Cresse	106	2000
3	Tommy White	105	2023
4	Eddy Furniss	103	1996
5	Todd Walker	102	1993
6	Brad Cresse	90	1998
7	Wes Grisham	85	1989
8	Trey McClure	84	1998
	Brad Hawpe	84	2000
10	Harry Berrios	82	1993
	Jeff Leaumont	82	1999

Single Game
Rk	Player	RBI	Season	Opponent
1	Eric Hendrickson	9	1999	Ohio
	Brayden Jobert	9	2022	Vanderbilt

== Runs ==
Career
Rk	Player	R	Seasons
1	Jason Williams	270	1993 1994 1995 1996
2	Eddy Furniss	260	1995 1996 1997 1998
	Blair Barbier	260	1997 1998 1999 2000
4	Dylan Crews	237	2021 2022 2023
5	Todd Walker	234	1992 1993 1994
6	Blake Dean	223	2007 2008 2009 2010
7	Russ Johnson	216	1992 1993 1994
8	Antoine Duplantis	213	2016 2017 2018 2019
9	Tookie Johnson	211	1988 1989 1990 1991
10	Brad Cresse	205	1997 1998 1999 2000

Season
Rk	Player	R	Season
1	Dylan Crews	100	2023
2	Nathan Dunn	95	1996
3	Mike Fontenot	93	2000
4	Dylan Crews	87	2022
5	Todd Walker	85	1993
	Eddy Furniss	85	1998
	Kramer Robertson	85	2017
8	Russ Johnson	83	1993
9	Brandon Larson	82	1997
	Blair Barbier	82	1997
	Tre' Morgan	82	2022

Single Game
Rk	Player	R	Season	Opponent
1	12 players	5	Most recent: Kramer Robertson, 2017 vs. Georgia	

== Hits ==
Career
Rk	Player	H	Seasons
1	Antoine Duplantis	359	2016 2017 2018 2019
2	Eddy Furniss	352	1995 1996 1997 1998
3	Blake Dean	332	2007 2008 2009 2010
4	Jason Williams	327	1993 1994 1995 1996
5	Todd Walker	310	1992 1993 1994
6	Blair Barbier	307	1997 1998 1999 2000
7	Dylan Crews	286	2021 2022 2023
8	Ryan Patterson	284	2003 2004 2005
9	Blake Gill	279	2002 2003 2004 2005
10	Tookie Johnson	278	1988 1989 1990 1991

Season
Rk	Player	H	Season
1	Dylan Crews	110	2023
	Brandon Larson	110	1997
3	Todd Walker	109	1993
4	Wes Grisham	106	1989
	Brad Cresse	106	2000
	J.C. Holt	106	2004
7	Brad Hawpe	104	2000
	Alex Bregman	104	2013
9	Mike Fontenot	103	2000
10	Tommy White	102	2023
	Sean Barker	102	2002

Single Game
Rk	Player	H	Season	Opponent
1	Jack Walker	6	1936	Ole Miss
	Antoine Duplantis	6	2017	Georgia

== Stolen Bases ==
Career
Rk	Player	SB	Seasons
1	Rob Hartwig	73	1986 1987
2	Jared Mitchell	70	2007 2008 2009
3	Larry Wright	66	1975 1976 1977 1978
	Alex Bregman	66	2013 2014 2015
5	Russ Johnson	61	1992 1993 1994
6	Mikie Mahtook	60	2009 2010 2011
7	Jake Fraley	59	2014 2015 2016
8	Jeff Reboulet	58	1985 1986
9	Antoine Duplantis	57	2016 2017 2018 2019
	Ron Lim	57	1989 1990

Season
Rk	Player	SB	Season
1	Rob Hartwig	42	1987
2	Alex Bregman	38	2015
3	Jared Mitchell	36	2009
4	Jeff Reboulet	34	1985
5	Ron Lim	33	1989
6	Rob Hartwig	31	1986
7	Mikie Mahtook	29	2011
8	Josh Dalton	28	1998
	Jake Fraley	28	2016
10	Russ Johnson	26	1994
	Andrew Stevenson	26	2015
	Cole Freeman	26	2016

Single Game
Rk	Player	SB	Season	Opponent
1	Wally McMakin	4	1975	Michigan State
	Jared Mitchell	4	2009	Kentucky
	Leon Landry	4	2010	William & Mary
	Alex Bregman	4	2015	Northwestern State

== Earned Run Average ==
Career (min. 100 career innings)
Rk	Player	ERA	Seasons
1	Paul Skenes	1.69 (23 ER, 122.2 IP)	2023
2	Bruce Baudier	1.70 (23 ER, 121.1 IP)	1966 1967
3	Allen Smith	1.82 (48 ER, 237.1 IP)	1960 1961 1962
4	Hunter Newman	1.83 (26 ER, 128.0 IP)	2013 2014 2015 2016 2017
5	Lloyd Peever	1.98 (23 ER, 104.2 IP)	1992
6	Dick Hicks	2.05 (30 ER, 131.2 IP)	1967 1968
7	Aaron Nola	2.09 (77 ER, 332 IP)	2012 2013 2014
8	Rick Farizo	2.13 (27 ER, 116.1 IP)	1968 1969 1970 1971
9	Chris Cotton	2.26 (32 ER, 127.1 IP)	2010 2011 2012 2013
10	Steve George	2.36 (41 ER, 156.1 IP)	1962 1963 1964

Season
Rk	Player	ERA	Season
1	Rick Farizo	0.21 (1 ER, 41.2 IP)	1970
2	Hunter Newman	0.49 (2 ER, 36.2 IP)	2015
3	Bruce Baudier	1.10 (6 ER, 49 IP)	1966
4	Chris Cotton	1.16 (6 ER, 46.2 IP)	2013
5	Tom Barfield	1.33 (4 ER, 27 IP)	1954
6	Mike Tullier	1.34 (9 ER, 60.1 IP)	1968
7	Allen Smith	1.35 (12 ER, 80 IP)	1961
8	Don Schneider	1.38 (8 ER, 52.1 IP)	1980
9	Rick Farizo	1.44 (8 ER, 50 IP)	1968
10	Aaron Nola	1.47 (19 ER, 116.1 IP)	2014

== Strikeouts ==
Career
Rk	Player	K	Seasons
1	Scott Schultz	409	1992 1993 1994 1995
2	Alex Lange	406	2015 2016 2017
3	Ben McDonald	373	1987 1988 1989
4	Aaron Nola	345	2012 2013 2014
5	Mike Sirotka	326	1990 1991 1992 1993
6	Paul Byrd	319	1989 1990 1991
7	Stan Loewer	317	1984 1985 1986 1987
8	Mark Guthrie	313	1984 1985 1986 1987
	Russell Springer	313	1987 1988 1989
10	Randy Wiles	310	1970 1971 1972 1973

Season
Rk	Player	K	Season
1	Paul Skenes	209	2023
2	Ben McDonald	202	1989
3	Kade Anderson	180	2025
4	Anthony Ranaudo	159	2009
5	Doug Thompson	158	1997
6	Kurt Ainsworth	157	1999
7	Eddie Yarnall	156	1996
	Russell Springer	156	1988
9	Anthony Eyanson	152	2025
10	Scott Schultz	150	1995
	Alex Lange	150	2017

Single Game
Rk	Player	K	Season	Opponent
1	Butch Mixon	24	1959	Southwestern Louisiana
