= List of college baseball career home run leaders =

The following is a list of NCAA Division I baseball career and single-season home run leaders.

== Career home run leaders ==
Rank	Player	School	Years	Games	Home runs
1	Pete Incaviglia	Oklahoma State	1983–1985	213	100
2	Jeff Ledbetter	Florida State	1979-1982	262	97
3	Todd Greene	Georgia Southern	1990–1993	240	88
4	Eddy Furniss	LSU	1995–1998	265	80
5	Frank Fazzini	Florida State	1983–1985	234	79
6	Brad Cresse	LSU	1997–2000	236	78
7	George Canale	Virginia Tech	1984–1986	180	76
t-8	Chad Sutter	Tulane	1996–1999	244	75
t-8	Tommy White	LSU	2022-2024	187	75
t-8	Jac Caglianone	Florida	2022-2024	164	75
t-10	T.J. Soto	Louisiana Tech	1997–2000	215	72

== Single-season home run leaders ==
Rank	Player	School	Year	Games	Home runs
1	Pete Incaviglia	Oklahoma State	1985	75	48
2	Jeff Ledbetter	Florida State	1982	74	42
3	Lance Berkman	Rice	1997	63	41
4	Brandon Larson	LSU	1997	69	40
t-5	Steve Hacker	Missouri State	1995	58	37
t-5	Charlie Condon	Georgia	2024	60	37
7	Russ Spence	Auburn	1988	62	36
8	Jac Caglianone	Florida	2024	65	35
t-9	Christian Moore	Tennessee	2024	72	34
t-9	Troy Glaus	UCLA	1997	67	34
t-9	Daylan Holt	Texas A&M	1999	70	34
t-12	Jac Caglianone	Florida	2023	71	33
t-12	Joe Dillon	Texas Tech	1997	57	33
t-12	Frank Fazzini	Florida State	1985	81	33
t-12	Nate Gold	Gonzaga	2002	56	33
t-12	Kevin Mench	Delaware	1998	52	33
t-17	Billy Becher	New Mexico State	2003	61	32
t-17	Mark McGwire	Southern California	1984	67	32
t-17	Lance Shebelut	Fresno State	1988	68	32
t-17	Ivan Melendez	Texas	2022	67	32
t-21	Kris Bryant	San Diego	2013	62	31
t-21	Casey Child	Utah	1997	58	31
t-21	J. D. Drew	Florida State	1997	67	31
t-21	John Van Benschoten	Kent State	2001	61	31
t-21	Douglas Moulder	Sam Houston State	1999	59	31

== See also ==
- List of college baseball awards
- List of Major League Baseball career home run leaders
