= McLennan Community College =

Public college in Waco, Texas, US

Coordinates: 31°35′17″N 97°10′22″W

- Type: Public community college
- Established: 1965
- President: Johnette McKown
- Undergraduates: 8,900
- Location: Waco, Texas, United States
- Nickname: Highlanders/Highlassies
- Website: www.mclennan.edu
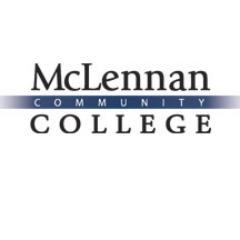

McLennan Community College (MCC) is a public community college in Waco, Texas. It opened in 1965 and now serves approximately 9,000 students, with more than 700 employees. It is governed by a board of trustees elected from single-member districts in the county.

== Campus ==
McLennan is one of three colleges in Waco along with Baylor University and Texas State Technical College. McLennan Community College is located on 200 acres (81 ha) on the north side of town near the Bosque River and Cameron Park. The college also owns Highlander Ranch, a 200-acre (81 ha) farm about 5 miles (8.0 km) from the main campus.

The campus was recently expanded to include three new buildings, which were built with funding from a bond passed by voters in November 2006: the Michaelis Academic Center, New Science Building, and Emergency Services Education Center.

MCC's campus also includes the Bosque River Stage, a 530-seat amphitheater located along the banks of the Bosque River. This outdoor venue was renovated in 2001 to expand the stage and update the lighting, sound, and concessions area.

== Organization and administration ==
As defined by the Texas Legislature, the official service area of McLennan Community College consists of:

- All of McLennan and Falls Counties, and
- The Calvert and Bremond school districts.

== Academics ==
MCC offers associate degrees in arts and sciences for students who want to transfer to other colleges and universities. The school also has training programs — associate degrees in applied science and certificates — for students who want to enter the workforce. The college also offers continuing education courses for community members.

The University Center at MCC is a partnership with several public universities that offer degree programs on MCC's campus. It offers students the opportunity to earn affordable bachelor's, master's, and doctoral degrees without leaving central Texas. Partner universities are Midwestern State University, Tarleton State University, University of Texas Medical Branch, The University of Texas at Brownsville, and Texas Tech University.

== Sports ==
McLennan's mascot is a Scottish Highlander. Men's athletic teams are referred as the Highlanders and women's teams are the Highlassies. MCC's athletics program includes:

- Men's and women's basketball
- Baseball
- Softball
- Men's and women's golf
- Dance

== Notable alumni ==
- Jay Buhner, professional baseball player
- Ruthie Foster, singer-songwriter of blues and folk music
- Sean Henn, professional baseball player
- Vinnie Johnson, professional basketball player
- Danny Kaspar, college basketball coach
- Pat Listach, professional baseball player
- Sean Lowe, professional baseball player
- Chris Martin, professional baseball player
- Craig McMurtry, professional baseball player
- Ryan Merritt, professional baseball player
- Rodrick Monroe, professional football player
- Logan Ondrusek, professional baseball player
- Ken Patterson, professional baseball player
- Leonard Perry, college basketball coach
- Richie Ramsay, professional golfer
- Jason Scobie, professional baseball player
- Members of the Sons of the Desert, late 1990s country music group
- Dave van Horn, professional baseball player and college baseball coach
- Sam Worthen, professional basketball player
- Bailey Horn, professional baseball player
