= 2000 Trans America Athletic Conference baseball tournament =

American college baseball tournament

- Teams: 6
- Format: Double-elimination
- Finals site: Alexander Brest Field; Jacksonville, FL
- Champions: Stetson (4th title)
- Winning coach: Pete Dunn (4th title)
- MVP: Jeff Christy (Stetson)

2000 Trans America Athletic Conference baseball standings
	Conf.				Overall
Team	W		L	PCT	W		L	PCT
UCF ‍†‍‍^{y}	22	–	5	.815	43	–	19	.694
Florida Atlantic ‍‍‍^{y}	20	–	7	.741	43	–	19	.694
No. 23 Stetson ‍‍‡‍^{y}	20	–	7	.741	48	–	16	.750
Jacksonville ‍‍‍	16	–	11	.593	34	–	24	.586
Georgia State ‍‍‍	14	–	13	.519	31	–	28	.525
Campbell ‍‍‍	12	–	15	.444	31	–	25	.554
Troy ‍‍‍	11	–	16	.407	22	–	34	.393
Mercer ‍‍‍	8	–	19	.296	16	–	35	.314
Jacksonville State ‍‍‍	6	–	21	.222	23	–	32	.418
Samford ‍‍‍	6	–	21	.222	29	–	34	.460
† – Conference champion ‡ – Tournament champion y – Invited to the NCAA tournament As of June 30, 2000; Rankings from Collegiate Baseball

The 2000 Trans America Athletic Conference baseball tournament was held at John Sessions Stadium at Alexander Brest Field on the campus of Jacksonville University in Jacksonville, Florida, from May 17 through 20. Stetson won its fourth tournament championship to earn the Trans America Athletic Conference's automatic bid to the 2000 NCAA Division I baseball tournament.

== Seeding ==
The top six teams (based on conference results) from the conference earn invites to the tournament.

Team	W	L	PCT	GB	Seed
UCF	22	5	.815	—	1
Florida Atlantic	20	7	.741	2	2
Stetson	20	7	.741	2	3
Jacksonville	16	11	.593	6	4
Georgia State	14	13	.519	8	5
Campbell	12	15	.444	10	6
Troy State	11	16	.407	11	—
Mercer	8	19	.296	14	—
Jacksonville State	6	21	.222	16	—
Samford	6	21	.222	16	—

== Results ==
First round
1	UCF	0
6	Campbell	5
3	Stetson	11
4	Jacksonville	1
2	Florida Atlantic	4
5	Georgia State	3

Second round
6	Campbell	4
4	Jacksonville	3
3	Stetson	9^{12}
2	Florida Atlantic	7
1	UCF	5
5	Georgia State	6

Third round
6	Campbell	0
3	Stetson	2
2	Florida Atlantic	7
5	Georgia State	8

Semifinals
6	Campbell	5
5	Georgia State	3

Final
3	Stetson	15	–
6	Campbell	2	–

== All-Tournament Team ==
The following players were named to the All-Tournament Team.

Pos	Name	Team
P	Jason Oglesby	Stetson
P	Lenny DiNardo	Stetson
C	Mike Fellman	Stetson
C	Jeff Davis	Campbell
IF	Jeff Huff	Campbell
IF	Michael Nelson	Georgia State
IF	Brooks Stephens	Stetson
OF	Frank Corr	Stetson
OF	Jeff Christy	Stetson
DH	Andy Wilson	Stetson
DH	Adam Hawes	Campbell

=== Tournament Most Valuable Player ===
Jeff Christy was named Tournament Most Valuable Player. Christy was an outfielder for Stetson.
