= 2000 Southland Conference baseball tournament =

- Teams: 6
- Format: Double-elimination
- Finals site: Warhawk Field; Monroe, Louisiana
- Champions: Southwest Texas State (3rd title)
- Winning coach: Ty Harrington (1st title)
- MVP: Shane Webb (Louisiana–Monroe)

2000 Southland Conference baseball standings
	Conf.				Overall
Team	W		L	PCT	W		L	PCT
McNeese State ‍†‍‍	20	–	7	.741	39	–	20	.661
Louisiana–Monroe ‍†‍‍	20	–	7	.741	41	–	22	.651
Southwest Texas State ‍‍‡‍^{y}	16	–	11	.593	34	–	29	.540
Nicholls State ‍‍‍	15	–	12	.556	27	–	29	.482
Northwestern State ‍‍‍	14	–	13	.519	30	–	26	.536
Sam Houston State ‍‍‍	14	–	13	.519	25	–	29	.463
Lamar ‍‍‍	11	–	16	.407	27	–	27	.500
Southeastern Louisiana ‍‍‍	10	–	17	.370	25	–	28	.472
Texas–Arlington ‍‍‍	9	–	18	.333	24	–	30	.444
Texas–San Antonio ‍‍‍	6	–	21	.222	17	–	37	.315
† – Conference champion ‡ – Tournament champion y – Invited to the NCAA tournament As of June 30, 2000; Rankings from Collegiate Baseball

The 2000 Southland Conference baseball tournament was held from May 7 to 10, 2000 to determine the champion of the Southland Conference in the sport of college baseball for the 2000 season. The event pitted the top six finishers from the conference's regular season in a double-elimination tournament held at Warhawk Field, home field of Louisiana–Monroe in Monroe, Louisiana. Third-seeded Southwest Texas State won their second consecutive, and third overall, championship and claimed the automatic bid to the 2000 NCAA Division I baseball tournament.

== Seeding and format ==
The top six finishers from the regular season were seeded one through six. They played a double-elimination tournament.

Team	W	L	T	Pct	Seed
Louisiana–Monroe	20	7	.741	—	1
McNeese State	20	7	.741	—	2
Southwest Texas State	16	11	.593	4	3
Nicholls State	15	12	.556	5	4
Northwestern State	14	13	.519	6	5
Sam Houston State	14	13	.519	6	6
Lamar	11	16	.407	9	—
Southeastern Louisiana	10	17	.370	10	—
Texas–Arlington	9	18	.333	11	—
UTSA	6	21	.222	14	—

== Bracket and results ==
First round
1	Louisiana–Monroe	7
6	Sam Houston State	5
3	Southwest Texas State	13
4	Nicholls State	12
2	McNeese State	4
5	Northwestern State	6

Second round
1	Louisiana–Monroe	12
4	Nicholls State	6
3	Southwest Texas State	5
5	Northwestern State	1
6	Sam Houston State	4^{11}
2	McNeese State	3

Third round
1	Louisiana–Monroe	4
3	Southwest Texas State	6
5	Northwestern State	3
6	Sam Houston State	1

Semifinals
1	Louisiana–Monroe	4^{11}
5	Northwestern State	3

Final
3	Southwest Texas State	3	—
1	Louisiana–Monroe	2	—

== All-Tournament Team ==
The following players were named to the All-Tournament Team.

Pos.	Name	School
P	Jason Slanina	Northwestern State
P	Nathan Boyd	Sam Houston State
C	Chris Seaman	Southwest Texas State
1B	Buddy Proctor	Northwestern State
2B	Rondon Anderson	Nicholls State
3B	Willie Core	Louisiana–Monroe
SS	Shane Webb	Louisiana–Monroe
OF	Jason Washington	Southwest Texas State
OF	Terrence Moore	Southwest Texas State
OF	Nolan Parker	McNeese State
DH	Mike Wombacher	Louisiana–Monroe

=== Most Valuable Player ===
Shane Webb was named Tournament Most Valuable Player. Webb was a shortstop for Louisiana–Monroe.
