= 2000 Colonial Athletic Association baseball tournament =

American college baseball tournament

- Teams: 8
- Format: Double-elimination tournament
- Finals site: Coy Tillett Sr. Memorial Field; Manteo, North Carolina
- Champions: East Carolina (7th title)
- Winning coach: Keith LeClair (2nd title)
- MVP: Lee Delfino (East Carolina)

2000 Colonial Athletic Association baseball standings
	Conf.						Overall
Team	W		L		T	PCT	W		L		T	PCT
Old Dominion ‍†‍‍^{y}	14	–	7	–	0	.667	33	–	24	–	1	.578
No. 29 East Carolina ‍†‍‡‍^{y}	14	–	7	–	0	.667	46	–	18	–	0	.719
UNC Wilmington ‍‍‍	13	–	8	–	0	.619	36	–	23	–	0	.610
James Madison ‍‍‍	12	–	9	–	0	.571	37	–	22	–	0	.627
VCU ‍‍‍	9	–	12	–	0	.429	39	–	22	–	0	.639
Richmond ‍‍‍	8	–	13	–	0	.381	25	–	29	–	0	.463
George Mason ‍‍‍	7	–	14	–	0	.333	21	–	34	–	1	.384
William & Mary ‍‍‍	7	–	14	–	0	.333	32	–	25	–	0	.561
† – Conference champion ‡ – Tournament champion y – Invited to the NCAA tournament As of June 30, 2000; Rankings from Collegiate Baseball

The 2000 Colonial Athletic Association baseball tournament was held at Coy Tillett Sr. Memorial Field in Manteo, North Carolina, from May 16 through 20. The event determined the champion of the Colonial Athletic Association for the 2000 season. Second-seeded East Carolina won the tournament for the seventh time, and second in a row, and earned the CAA's automatic bid to the 2000 NCAA Division I baseball tournament.

Entering the event, East Carolina had won the most championships, with six. Old Dominion and Richmond had each won three, while George Mason had won twice.

== Format and seeding ==
The CAA's teams were seeded one to eight based on winning percentage from the conference's round robin regular season. They played a double-elimination tournament.

Team	W	L	Pct.	GB	Seed
Old Dominion	14	7	.667	—	1
East Carolina	14	7	.667	—	2
UNC Wilmington	13	8	.619	1	3
James Madison	12	9	.571	2	4
VCU	9	12	.429	5	5
Richmond	8	13	.381	6	6
George Mason	7	14	.368	7	7
William & Mary	7	14	.286	7	8

== Bracket and results ==
Upper round 1	Upper round 2	Upper final	Final
1	Old Dominion	16
8	William & Mary	11
1	Old Dominion	5
5	VCU	6
4	James Madison	1
5	VCU	4
5	VCU	5
2	East Carolina	8
3	UNC Wilmington	9
6	Richmond	7
3	UNC Wilmington	4
2	East Carolina	5
2	East Carolina	8
7	George Mason	3	2	East Carolina	7	—
5	VCU	6	—
Lower round 1	Lower round 2	Lower round 3	Lower final
1	Old Dominion	5
8	William & Mary	16	8	William & Mary	9	5	VCU	14
7	George Mason	5	8	William & Mary	11	8	William & Mary	13
4	James Madison	4
3	UNC Wilmington	5
4	James Madison	24	4	James Madison	6
6	Richmond	21

== Most Valuable Player ==
Lee Delfino was named Tournament Most Valuable Player. Delfino was a shortstop for East Carolina.
