= 2000 LSU Tigers baseball team =

American college baseball season

2000 LSU Tigers baseball

College World Series champions SEC tournament Champions
- Conference: Southeastern Conference
- Record: 52-17 (19–10 SEC)
- Head coach: Skip Bertman (17th year)
- Assistant coaches: Dane Canevari (10th year); Turtle Thomas (1st year)
- Home stadium: Alex Box Stadium

2000 Southeastern Conference baseball standings
	Conf.				Overall
Team	W		L	PCT	W		L	PCT
Eastern
No. 9 South Carolina ^{x}‍†‍‍^{y}	25	–	5	.833	53	–	8	.869
No. 17 Florida ‍‍‍^{y}	18	–	11	.621	44	–	23	.657
Georgia ‍‍‍	14	–	15	.483	32	–	26	.552
Kentucky ‍‍‍	12	–	16	.429	38	–	20	.655
Tennessee ‍‍‍	10	–	18	.357	40	–	23	.635
Vanderbilt ‍‍‍	5	–	24	.172	21	–	33	.389
Western
No. 1 LSU ^{x}‍‍‡‍^{y}	19	–	10	.655	52	–	17	.754
No. 15 Mississippi State ‍‍‍^{y}	17	–	10	.630	39	–	17	.696
No. 25 Auburn ‍‍‍^{y}	17	–	13	.567	41	–	20	.672
No. 27 Alabama ‍‍‍^{y}	16	–	14	.533	41	–	24	.631
Ole Miss ‍‍‍	12	–	17	.414	30	–	25	.545
Arkansas ‍‍‍	8	–	20	.286	24	–	30	.444
x – Division champion † – Conference champion ‡ – Tournament champion y – Invited to the NCAA tournament As of June 30, 2000; Rankings from Collegiate Baseball

The 2000 LSU Tigers baseball team represented Louisiana State University in the 2000 NCAA Division I baseball season. The Tigers played their home games at Alex Box Stadium. The team was coached by Skip Bertman in his 17th season at LSU.

The Tigers won the College World Series, defeating the Stanford Cardinal in the championship game for Bertman's fifth and final national championship at LSU.

== Roster ==
2000 LSU Tigers roster
Pitchers: 10 Chucky Son - Sophomore; 14 Tim Nugent - Junior; 18 David Miller - Junior; 21 Brian Tallet - Junior; 23 Chad Vaught - Freshman; 25 Jeremy Loftice - Senior; 27 Trey Hodges - Senior; 27 Ben Saxon - Senior; 30 Brad David - Freshman; 32 Sam Taulli - Freshman; 34 Bo Pettit - Freshman; 35 Hunter Gomez - Senior; 37 Ryan Richard - Freshman; 38 Heath McMurray - Junior; 40 Jason Scobie - Junior; 42 Shane Youman - Sophomore; 43 Billy Brian - Sophomore; 44 Weylin Guidry - Sophomore; 48 Jeremy Alford - Freshman; 50 David Shank - Junior	Infielders: 1 Ryan Theriot - Sophomore; 4 Blair Barbier - Senior; 6 Victor Brumfield - Sophomore; 8 Johnnie Thibodeaux - Junior; 9 Mike Daly - Junior; 13 Ray Wright - Junior; 16 Jeff Lipari - Junior; 25 Brad Hawpe - Junior; 29 Mike Fontenot - Freshman; 31 Wally Pontiff - Freshman; 46 Thomas Evans - Freshman; Catchers: 22 Brad Cresse - Senior; 39 Ryan Jorgensen - Junior; 41 Nathan Meiners - Freshman; 47 Jamin Garidel - Junior	Outfielders: 2 Antoine Simon - Senior; 3 Jeremy Witten - Senior; 7 Tommy Morel - Sophomore; 12 Billy McBride - Freshman; 20 David Raymer - Junior; 24 Cedrick Harris - Junior; 33 Christian Bourgeois - Junior; Coaches: 15 Skip Bertman – 17th season; 11 Dane Canevari – 10th season; 17 Turtle Thomas – 1st season

== Schedule and results ==
2000 LSU Tigers baseball game log (52–17)
Regular season (39–17)

February (7–5)
Date	Opponent	Rank	Site/stadium	Score	Win	Loss	Save	Overall record	SEC record
February 12	Virginia	No. 8	Alex Box Stadium	W 8–0	Tallet (1–0)			1–0	–
February 12	Virginia	No. 8	Alex Box Stadium	W 13–2	Pettit (1–0)			2–0	–
February 13	Virginia	No. 8	Alex Box Stadium	W 13–4	Brian (1–0)			3–0	–
February 15	SE Louisiana	No. 5	Alex Box Stadium	W 11–0	Gomez (1–0)			4–0	–
February 18	No. 19 Arizona State	No. 5	Alex Box Stadium	W 8–4	Tallet (2–0)			5–0	–
February 19	No. 19 Arizona State	No. 5	Alex Box Stadium	W 6–5	Saxon (1–0)			6–0	–
February 20	No. 19 Arizona State	No. 5	Alex Box Stadium	L 2–6		Brian (1–1)		6–1	–
February 22	McNeese State	No. 3	Alex Box Stadium	L 8–9		Guidry (0–1)		6–2	–
February 25	No. 10 Houston	No. 3	Alex Box Stadium	L 2–10		Tallet (2–1)		6–3	–
February 26	No. 10 Houston	No. 3	Alex Box Stadium	L 7–11		Guidry (0–2)		6–4	–
February 27	No. 10 Houston	No. 3	Alex Box Stadium	L 2–10		Brian (1–2)		6–5	–
February 29	Nicholls State	No. 15	Alex Box Stadium	W 8–2	Hodges (1–0)			7–5	–

March (13–4)
Date	Opponent	Rank	Site/stadium	Score	Win	Loss	Save	Overall record	SEC record
March 1	Tulane	No. 15	Alex Box Stadium	W 12–5	Tallet (3–1)			8–5	–
March 3	at Central Florida	No. 15	Tinker Field	L 13–14		Pettit (1–1)		8–6	–
March 4	at Central Florida	No. 15	Tinker Field	W 11–4	Hodges (2–0)			9–6	–
March 5	at Central Florida	No. 15	Tinker Field	W 4–1	Tallet (4–1)			10–6	–
March 7	Southern	No. 16	Alex Box Stadium	W 7–3	Brian (2–2)			11–6	–
March 10	Georgia	No. 16	Alex Box Stadium	L 3–7		Tallet (4–2)		11–7	0–1
March 11	Georgia	No. 16	Alex Box Stadium	L 8–10		McMurray (0–1)		11–8	0–2
March 12	Georgia	No. 16	Alex Box Stadium	W 13–3	Saxon (2–0)			12–8	1–2
March 14	at SE Louisiana	No. 23	Alex Box Stadium	W 11–4	Gomez (2–0)			13–8	–
March 17	at Vanderbilt	No. 23	McGugin Field	W 6–0	Tallet (5–2)			14–8	2–2
March 18	at Vanderbilt	No. 23	McGugin Field	W 17–4	Gomez (3–0)			15–8	3–2
March 22	New Orleans	No. 23	Alex Box Stadium	W 17–2	Pettit (2–1)			16–8	–
March 24	No. 2 South Carolina	No. 23	Alex Box Stadium	W 8–6	Saxon (3–0)			17–8	4–2
March 25	No. 2 South Carolina	No. 23	Alex Box Stadium	W 7–6	Youman (1–0)			18–8	5–2
March 26	No. 2 South Carolina	No. 23	Alex Box Stadium	L 7–9		Pettit (2–2)		18–9	5–3
March 28	at Centenary	No. 17	Sheehee Stadium	W 6–3	Brian (3–2)			19–9	–
March 31	at No. 7 Auburn	No. 17	Plainsman Park	W 18–11	Gomez (4–0)			20–9	6–3

April (15–5)
Date	Opponent	Rank	Site/stadium	Score	Win	Loss	Save	Overall record	SEC record
April 1	at No. 7 Auburn	No. 17	Plainsman Park	L 1–7		Hodges (2–1)		20–10	6–4
April 2	at No. 7 Auburn	No. 17	Plainsman Park	W 12–10	McMurray (1–1)			21–10	7–4
April 4	at New Orleans	No. 12	Maestri Field	W 10–2	Tallet (6–2)			22–10	–
April 5	Southern	No. 12	Alex Box Field	W 10–5	Brian (4–2)			23–10	–
April 7	Arkansas	No. 12	Alex Box Stadium	W 12–3	Gomez (5–0)			24–10	8–4
April 8	Arkansas	No. 12	Alex Box Stadium	W 12–3	Tallet (7–2)			25–10	9–4
April 9	Arkansas	No. 12	Alex Box Stadium	W 17–11	Scobie (1–0)			26–10	10–4
April 11	No. 9 Louisiana–Lafayette	No. 7	Alex Box Stadium	W 8–2	Pettit (3–2)			27–10	–
April 15	at No. 29 Florida	No. 7	McKethan Stadium	W 10–4	Gomez (6–0)			28–10	11–4
April 15	at No. 29 Florida	No. 7	McKethan Stadium	W 9–6	Tallet (8–2)			29–10	12–4
April 16	at No. 29 Florida	No. 7	McKethan Stadium	L 5–7		Hodges (2–2)		29–11	12–5
April 18	Louisiana–Monroe	No. 8	Alex Box Stadium	W 12–5	Saxon (4–0)			30–11	–
April 19	at No. 29 Tulane	No. 8	Turchin Stadium	W 21–6	Hodges (3–2)			31–11	–
April 21	No. 15 Mississippi State	No. 8	Alex Box Stadium	L 13–15		Pettit (3–3)		31–12	12–6
April 22	No. 15 Mississippi State	No. 8	Alex Box Stadium	W 18–15	Tallet (9–2)			32–12	13–6
April 23	No. 15 Mississippi State	No. 8	Alex Box Stadium	L 3–10		Scobie (1–1)		32–13	13–7
April 25	Northwestern State	No. 9	Alex Box Stadium	W 13–0	McMurray (2–1)			33–13	–
April 28	at Mississippi	No. 9	Swayze Field	W 12–6	Gomez (7–0)			34–13	14–7
April 29	at Mississippi	No. 9	Swayze Field	L 4–6		Tallet (9–3)		34–14	14–8
April 30	at Mississippi	No. 9	Swayze Field	W 9–2	Pettit (4–3)			35–14	15–8

May (4–3)
Date	Opponent	Rank	Site/stadium	Score	Win	Loss	Save	Overall record	SEC record
May 2	at McNeese State	No. 10	Cowboy Diamond	L 3–4		McMurray (2–2)		35–15	–
May 5	at Kentucky	No. 10	Cliff Hagan Stadium	W 9–0	Tallet (10–3)			36–15	16–8
May 6	at Kentucky	No. 10	Cliff Hagan Stadium	W 6–4	Pettit (5–3)			37–15	17–8
May 7	at Kentucky	No. 10	Cliff Hagan Stadium	L 4–7		Gomez (7–1)		37–16	17–9
May 12	No. 18 Alabama	No. 12	Alex Box Stadium	W 11–4	Tallet (11–3)			38–16	18–9
May 13	No. 18 Alabama	No. 12	Alex Box Stadium	W 6–4	Gomez (8–1)			39–16	19–9
May 14	No. 18 Alabama	No. 12	Alex Box Stadium	L 0–14		McMurray (2–3)		39–17	19–10

Postseason (13–0)

SEC Tournament (4–0)
Date	Opponent	Seed/rank	Site/stadium	Score	Win	Loss	Save	Overall record	SECT record
May 17	vs. (7) Georgia	(2) No. 10	Hoover Metropolitan Stadium	W 11–3	Tallet (12–3)			40–17	1–0
May 18	vs. (6) No. 19 Alabama	(2) No. 10	Hoover Metropolitan Stadium	W 18–12	Brian (5–2)			41–17	2–0
May 20	vs. (6) No. 19 Alabama	(2) No. 10	Hoover Metropolitan Stadium	W 6–5	Youman (2–0)			42–17	3–0
May 21	vs. (4) No. 21 Florida	(2) No. 10	Hoover Metropolitan Stadium	W 9–6	Gomez (9–1)			43–17	4–0

NCAA tournament – Baton Rouge Regional (3–0)
Date	Opponent	Seed/rank	Site/stadium	Score	Win	Loss	Save	Overall record	NCAAT record
May 26	vs. (4) Jackson State	(1) No. 7	Alex Box Stadium	W 19–1	Saxon (5–0)			44–17	1–0
May 27	vs. (3) Louisiana–Monroe	(1) No. 7	Alex Box Stadium	W 21–0	Tallet (13–3)			45–17	2–0
May 28	vs. (3) Louisiana–Monroe	(1) No. 7	Alex Box Stadium	W 5–3	Youman (3–0)			46–17	3–0

NCAA tournament – Baton Rouge Super Regional (2–0)
Date	Opponent	Seed/rank	Site/stadium	Score	Win	Loss	Save	Overall record	NCAAT record
June 2	vs. No. 14 UCLA	(2) No. 4	Alex Box Stadium	W 8–2	Tallet (14–3)			47–17	4–0
June 3	vs. No. 14 UCLA	(2) No. 4	Alex Box Stadium	W 14–8	Brian (6–2)			48–17	5–0

College World Series (4–0)
Date	Opponent	Seed/rank	Site/stadium	Score	Win	Loss	Save	Overall record	NCAAT record
June 10	vs. No. 6 Texas	(2) No. 2	Rosenblatt Stadium	W 13–5	Tallet (15–3)			49–17	6–0
June 12	vs. No. 5 Southern California	(2) No. 2	Rosenblatt Stadium	W 10–4	Hodges (4–2)			50–17	7–0
June 15	vs. (6) No. 4 Florida State	(2) No. 2	Rosenblatt Stadium	W 6–3	Guidry (1–2)			51–17	8–0
June 17	vs. (8) No. 1 Stanford	(2) No. 2	Rosenblatt Stadium	W 6–5	Hodges (5–2)			52–17	9–0

Schedule source:

== Awards and honors ==
Blair Barbier

- College World Series All-Tournament Team
- SEC Tournament All-Tournament Team

Brad Cresse

- Johnny Bench Award
- All-America First Team
- All-SEC First Team

Mike Fontenot

- College World Series All-Tournament Team
- Freshman All-America First Team
- SEC Freshman of the Year
- College World Series All-Tournament Team

Cedrick Harris

- SEC Tournament All-Tournament Team

Brad Hawpe

- College World Series All-Tournament Team
- All-America Second Team
- SEC Tournament All-Tournament Team

Trey Hodges

- College World Series Most Outstanding Player

Bo Pettit

- Freshman All-America Honorable Mention

Wally Pontiff

- Freshman All-America Honorable Mention
- SEC Tournament Most Outstanding Player
- SEC Tournament All-Tournament Team

Brian Tallet

- All-America Second Team
- SEC Tournament All-Tournament Team

Ryan Theriot

- College World Series All-Tournament Team

== Tigers in the 2000 MLB draft ==
The following members of the LSU Tigers baseball program were drafted in the 2000 Major League Baseball draft.

Player	Position	Round	Overall	MLB team
Brian Tallet	LHP	2nd	55th	Cleveland Indians
Brad Cresse	C	5th	159th	Arizona Diamondbacks
Ryan Jorgensen	C	7th	193rd	Chicago Cubs
Cedrick Harris	OF	10th	309th	Arizona Diamondbacks
Brad Hawpe	1B	11th	317th	Colorado Rockies
Heath McMurray	RHP	12th	351st	Milwaukee Brewers
Trey Hodges	RHP	17th	520th	Atlanta Braves
Billy Brian	RHP	25th	734th	Kansas City Royals
