= Mark Cresse =

- Coach
- Born: September 21, 1951 (age 74); St. Albans, New York, U.S.
- Bats: Right Throws: Right
- Stats at Baseball Reference

Teams
- As coach: Los Angeles Dodgers (1974–1998)

Career highlights and awards
- 2× World Series champion (1981, 1988)

Mark Emery Cresse (born September 21, 1951) is an American former professional baseball catcher and Major League Baseball (MLB) coach, who is best remembered for his 25 years of coaching for the Los Angeles Dodgers (1974–1998).

Cresse was born in St. Albans, New York. He went on to play college baseball for Golden West College, before transferring to California State University, Long Beach, where he was a member of Sigma Pi fraternity.

== Baseball career ==
=== Playing ===
Cresse was drafted by the St. Louis Cardinals in the third round of the 1971 Major League Baseball draft. He played three seasons of Minor league baseball (MiLB), playing for five lower-level affiliates in the Cardinals' organization.

=== Coaching ===
Cresse was released by the Cardinals in 1974 then tried, but failed, to join the California Angels. Later in 1974, he was able to join the Dodgers, as a bullpen catcher and batting practice pitcher — which were (then) non-roster positions. Cresse was (officially) named bullpen coach in 1977 by Tommy Lasorda, making him one of the youngest coaches in professional baseball, at the age of twenty-five.

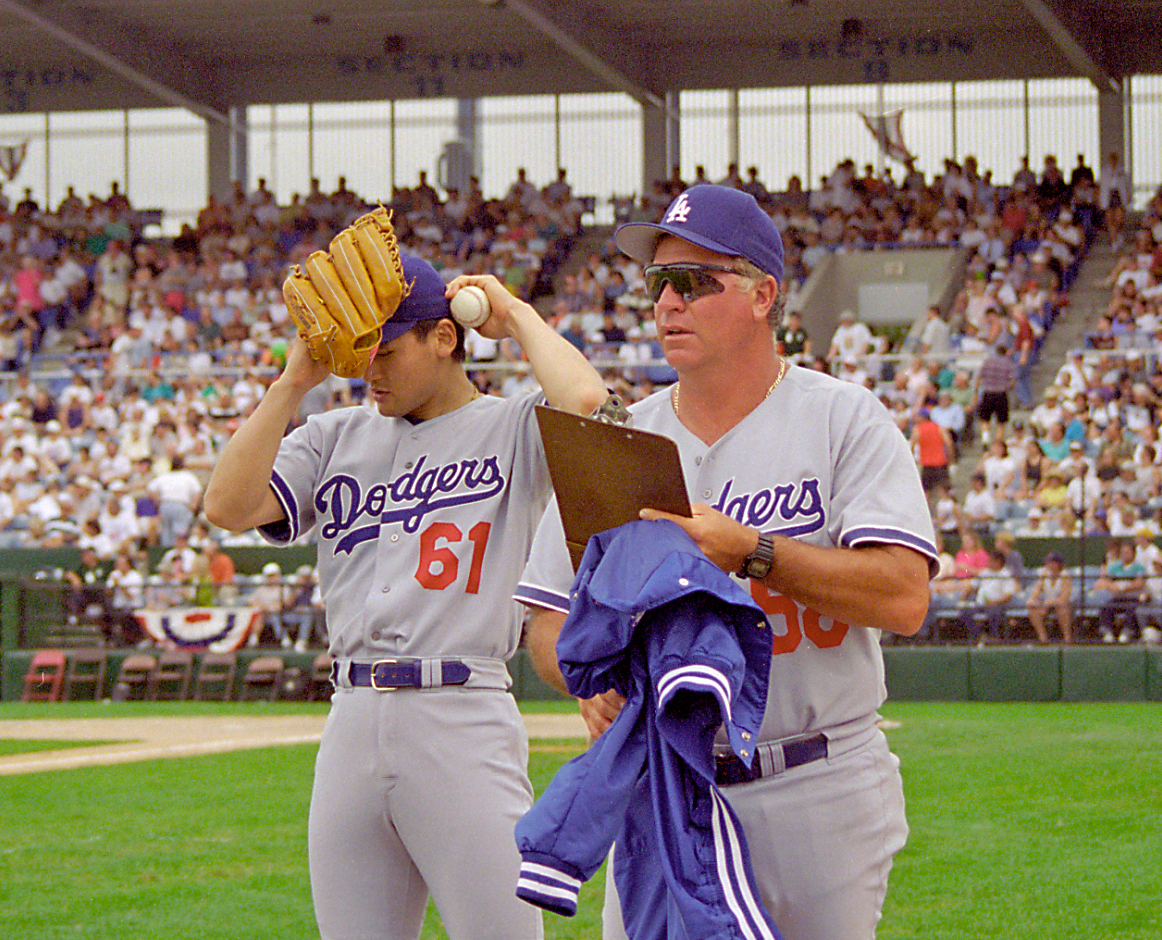
Los Angeles Dodgers coach Mark Cresse with pitcher Chan Ho Park during a 1998 spring training game in Fort Lauderdale, Fla.

Including his time as bullpen catcher, Cresse had a 25-season run as a member of the Dodgers' coaching staff, during which time he was a trusted advisor to the Dodgers' managers. He served on five National League (NL) pennant-winners and two (1981 and 1988) World Series champions.

== After coaching ==
Mark Cresse’s son, Brad, is a former minor league catcher.

The Mark Cresse School of Baseball was established in 1984. The list of past students who attended the school — and then went on to play in the big leagues — includes: Hall of Fame catcher Mike Piazza; Freddie Freeman; Cy Young Award runner-up Gerrit Cole; Mark Trumbo; David Fletcher; Austin Hedges; Jeff Kent; J. T. Snow; Craig Wilson; Michael Young; Howie Clark; Rocky Biddle; Ham Randle; and Hank Conger.

Preceded by Dixie Walker	Los Angeles Dodgers Bullpen Coach; 1974-1998	Succeeded by Rick Dempsey
