= 2000 Florida Gators baseball team =

American college baseball season

2000 Florida Gators baseball

Waco Regional, 3–2
- Conference: Southeastern Conference

Ranking
- Coaches: No. 21
- CB: No. 17
- Record: 44–23–1 (18–11–1 SEC)
- Head coach: Andy Lopez (6th year)
- Assistant coaches: Steve Kling (6th year); Mark Wasikowski (2nd year)
- Home stadium: Alfred A. McKethan Stadium

2000 Southeastern Conference baseball standings
	Conf.				Overall
Team	W		L	PCT	W		L	PCT
Eastern
No. 9 South Carolina ^{x}‍†‍‍^{y}	25	–	5	.833	53	–	8	.869
No. 17 Florida ‍‍‍^{y}	18	–	11	.621	44	–	23	.657
Georgia ‍‍‍	14	–	15	.483	32	–	26	.552
Kentucky ‍‍‍	12	–	16	.429	38	–	20	.655
Tennessee ‍‍‍	10	–	18	.357	40	–	23	.635
Vanderbilt ‍‍‍	5	–	24	.172	21	–	33	.389
Western
No. 1 LSU ^{x}‍‍‡‍^{y}	19	–	10	.655	52	–	17	.754
No. 15 Mississippi State ‍‍‍^{y}	17	–	10	.630	39	–	17	.696
No. 25 Auburn ‍‍‍^{y}	17	–	13	.567	41	–	20	.672
No. 27 Alabama ‍‍‍^{y}	16	–	14	.533	41	–	24	.631
Ole Miss ‍‍‍	12	–	17	.414	30	–	25	.545
Arkansas ‍‍‍	8	–	20	.286	24	–	30	.444
x – Division champion † – Conference champion ‡ – Tournament champion y – Invited to the NCAA tournament As of June 30, 2000; Rankings from Collegiate Baseball

The 2000 Florida Gators baseball team represented the University of Florida in the sport of baseball during the 2000 college baseball season. The Gators competed in Division I of the National Collegiate Athletic Association (NCAA) and the Eastern Division of the Southeastern Conference (SEC). They played their home games at Alfred A. McKethan Stadium, on the university's Gainesville, Florida campus. The team was coached by Andy Lopez, who was in his sixth season at Florida.

== Roster ==
2000 Florida Gators baseball team
Players
Coaches

#	Pos.	Name	B/T	Height	Weight	Year	Home town
24	RHP	Jay Belflower	R/R	6 ft 4 in (1.93 m)	215 lb (98 kg)	So	Sebring, FL
18	RHP	Chris Bell	R/R	6 ft 3 in (1.91 m)	195 lb (88 kg)	Fr	Miami, FL
48	LHP	Ken Birch	L/L	5 ft 10 in (1.78 m)	160 lb (73 kg)	Jr	Winter Springs, FL
45	RHP	Keith Brice	R/R	6 ft 2 in (1.88 m)	195 lb (88 kg)	Jr	Miami, FL
52	RHP	Jeff Burdick	R/R	5 ft 11 in (1.8 m)	215 lb (98 kg)	Fr	Fort Lauderdale, FL
41	RHP	Jeff Cardozo	R/R	6 ft 4 in (1.93 m)	190 lb (86 kg)	Jr	Hobe Sound, FL
49	RHP	Kevin Coleman	R/R	6 ft 1 in (1.85 m)	195 lb (88 kg)	So	Marietta, GA
15	OF	Ron Colombo	L/L	5 ft 5 in (1.65 m)	165 lb (75 kg)	Jr	Orlando, FL
2	INF	Aaron Davidson	R/R	5 ft 10 in (1.78 m)	175 lb (79 kg)	Jr	Atascadero, CA
25	RHP	Derek DeVaughan	R/R	6 ft 5 in (1.96 m)	220 lb (100 kg)	Sr	Binger, OK
30	OF	Jason Dill	L/L	6 ft 2 in (1.88 m)	210 lb (95 kg)	Jr	Punta Gorda, FL
13	INF	Kevin Estrada	S/R	6 ft 1 in (1.85 m)	170 lb (77 kg)	So	El Sugundo, CA
9	OF	Matt Goss	L/L	5 ft 11 in (1.8 m)	178 lb (81 kg)	So	Bartow, FL
21	RHP	Alex Hart	R/R	6 ft 6 in (1.98 m)	215 lb (98 kg)	So	Marion, PA
37	OF	Brian Haught	R/R	5 ft 10 in (1.78 m)	185 lb (84 kg)	Sr	Tampa, FL
31	C	Matt Heath	S/R	6 ft 1 in (1.85 m)	195 lb (88 kg)	So	Fernandina Beach, FL
3	OF	Tim Johnson	R/R	6 ft 0 in (1.83 m)	195 lb (88 kg)	Jr	Coventry, CT
5	INF	Kurt Keene	R/R	6 ft 0 in (1.83 m)	190 lb (86 kg)	Sr	Chattanooga, TN
17	INF	Mark Kiger	R/R	5 ft 11 in (1.8 m)	185 lb (84 kg)	So	La Jolla, CA
40	INF	David Klebonis	R/R	6 ft 0 in (1.83 m)	200 lb (91 kg)	So	Orlando, FL
42	LHP	Stuart McFarland	L/L	6 ft 5 in (1.96 m)	210 lb (95 kg)	Jr	Arden Hills, MN
20	LHP	Craig Mosher	L/L	6 ft 1 in (1.85 m)	195 lb (88 kg)	Jr	Richmond, BC
39	C	Keith Neubert	R/R	5 ft 10 in (1.78 m)	167 lb (76 kg)	Fr	St. Petersburg, FL
8	OF	Kyle Olson	L/L	6 ft 1 in (1.85 m)	190 lb (86 kg)	Fr	Crestview, FL
23	INF	Tim Olson	R/R	6 ft 3 in (1.91 m)	195 lb (88 kg)	Jr	Bismarck, ND
6	INF	Pat Osborn	R/R	6 ft 3 in (1.91 m)	200 lb (91 kg)	Fr	Bakersfield, CA
32	LHP	Tom Potter	L/L	6 ft 1 in (1.85 m)	180 lb (82 kg)	Fr	Naples, FL
47	LHP	Adam Prida	S/L	5 ft 8 in (1.73 m)	160 lb (73 kg)	Fr	Tampa, FL
10	OF	Ryan Raburn	R/R	5 ft 11 in (1.8 m)	170 lb (77 kg)	Fr	Dover, FL
36	LHP	Jimmy Ramshaw (injured)	L/L	6 ft 4 in (1.93 m)	186 lb (84 kg)	Jr	Canberra, AUS
22	LHP	Eddie Rojas	S/L	5 ft 10 in (1.78 m)	175 lb (79 kg)	Jr	Brooklyn, NY
55	C	Brian Rose	R/R	6 ft 2 in (1.88 m)	210 lb (95 kg)	Fr	Miami, FL
43	INF	Ryan Shealy	R/R	6 ft 5 in (1.96 m)	233 lb (106 kg)	So	Fort Lauderdale, FL
11	OF	Matt Siegel	L/R	5 ft 10 in (1.78 m)	175 lb (79 kg)	Jr	Tampa, FL
34	RHP	Joey Simon	R/R	6 ft 0 in (1.83 m)	195 lb (88 kg)	Fr	Tampa, FL
46	LHP	Bobby Sindelar	L/L	6 ft 2 in (1.88 m)	175 lb (79 kg)	Fr	Spring Hill, FL
28	LHP	Mike Smalley	L/L	6 ft 1 in (1.85 m)	190 lb (86 kg)	Jr	Orlando, FL
14	INF	Aaron Sobieraj	R/R	6 ft 1 in (1.85 m)	190 lb (86 kg)	Fr	Clearwater, FL
12	C	Tony Socarras	L/R	6 ft 0 in (1.83 m)	200 lb (91 kg)	Sr	Miami, FL
33	LHP	Mike Somers	R/L	6 ft 5 in (1.96 m)	220 lb (100 kg)	Fr	Lauderhill, FL
38	C	Nick Trefry	R/R	5 ft 10 in (1.78 m)	190 lb (86 kg)	Jr	Jacksonville, FL
27	RHP	K.O. Wiegandt	R/R	6 ft 1 in (1.85 m)	190 lb (86 kg)	Jr	Miami, FL
4	OF	Spencer Williams	L/R	5 ft 6 in (1.68 m)	169 lb (77 kg)	Jr	Lansdale, PA
16	INF	Taylor Wood	R/R	6 ft 0 in (1.83 m)	170 lb (77 kg)	Jr	Fernandina Beach, FL

Head coach

Andy Lopez

Assistant coach(es)

Mark Wasikowski

Legend

- (C) Team captain
- (S) Suspended
- (I) Ineligible
- Injured
- Current redshirt

Roster

== Schedule ==
2000 Florida Gators baseball game log: 44–23–1
Regular season: 38–20–1
January: 3–0

Date	Opponent	Rank	Stadium Site	Score	Win	Loss	Save	Attendance	Overall Record	SEC Record
January 20	at Hawaiʻi	No. 24	Rainbow Stadium; Honolulu, HI	12–6	Belflower (1–0)	Ho (0–1)	None	2,162	1–0	–
January 21	at Hawaiʻi	No. 24	Rainbow Stadium	10–1	Smalley (1–0)	Snider (0–1)	None	2,251	2–0	–
January 22	at Hawaiʻi	No. 24	Rainbow Stadium	8–7	McFarland (1–0)	Aloy (0–1)	Simon (1)	2,595	3–0	–

February: 4–7

Date	Opponent	Rank	Stadium Site	Score	Win	Loss	Save	Attendance	Overall Record	SEC Record
February 4	at No. 5 Miami (FL); Rivalry	No. 24	Mark Light Stadium; Coral Gables, FL	8–16	Howell (1–0)	Ramshaw (0–1)	None	3,633	3–1	–
February 5	at No. 5 Miami (FL); Rivalry	No. 24	Mark Light Stadium	1–17	Roberson (1–0)	Smalley (1–1)	None	4,004	3–2	–
February 9	Jacksonville	No. 24	McKethan Stadium	11-13	Shippee (1–0)	Simon (0–1)	Bell (1)	1,828	3–3	–
February 12	No. 5 Miami (FL); Rivalry	No. 24	McKethan Stadium	4–3	Simon (1–1)	DeBold (1–1)	None	3,012	4–3	–
February 13	No. 5 Miami (FL); Rivalry	No. 24	McKethan Stadium	20-11	Ramshaw (1–1)	Walker (0–1)	None	3,513	5–3	–
February 19	No. 1 Florida State; Rivalry	No. 20	McKethan Stadium	2–6	McDonald (3–0)	Hart (0–1)	None	5,613	5–4	–
February 20	No. 1 Florida State; Rivalry	No. 20	McKethan Stadium	8–17	Ziegler (3–0)	Mosher (0–1)	None	4,809	5–5	–
February 22	Florida A&M	No. 27	McKethan Stadium	10–3	Smalley (2–1)	Barton (1–2)	None	1,188	6–5	–
February 26	at No. 1 Florida State; Rivalry	No. 27	Dick Howser Stadium; Tallahassee, FL	2–6	McDonald (4–0)	Belflower (1–1)	None	5,039	6–6	–
February 27	at No. 1 Florida State; Rivalry	No. 27	Dick Howser Stadium	7–8	Jernigan (1–0)	Simon (1–2)	None	2,011	6–7	–
February 29	UNC Greensboro		McKethan Stadium	9–2	Smalley (3–1)	Phalines (1–1)	None	1,503	7–7	–

March: 13–7

Date	Opponent	Rank	Stadium Site	Score	Win	Loss	Save	Attendance	Overall Record	SEC Record
March 1	UNC Greensboro		McKethan Stadium	4–12	Gordon (1–0)	Sobieraj (0–1)	None	781	7–8	–
March 3	Massachusetts		McKethan Stadium	11–9	Belflower (2–1)	Skirkanich (0–1)	Birch (1)	1,522	8–8	–
March 4	Massachusetts		McKethan Stadium	7–1	Cardozo (1–0)	Santos (0–1)	None	1,252	9–8	–
March 5	Massachusetts		McKethan Stadium	7–5	Birch (1–0)	Szado (0–1)	None	1,457	10–8	–
March 7	Louisville		McKethan Stadium	7–11	Mattingly (2–3)	Mosher (0–2)	None	1,143	10–9	–
March 8	Louisville		McKethan Stadium	13–12^{10}	Sobieraj (1–1)	Green (0–3)	None	847	11–9	–
March 10	Ole Miss		McKethan Stadium	5–11	McAvoy (4–1)	Smalley (3–2)	Goodwin (2)	1,072	11–10	0–1
March 11	Ole Miss		McKethan Stadium	12–15	Morris (1–0)	Belflower (2–2)	Huisman (4)	1,643	11–11	0–2
March 12	Ole Miss		McKethan Stadium	13–3	Cardozo (2–0)	Cramblitt (3–2)	Birch (2)	1,360	12–11	1–2
March 14	Fordham		McKethan Stadium	6–4	Simon (2–2)	Kelly (0–1)	Mosher (1)	1,172	13–11	–
March 15	Fordham		McKethan Stadium	25–1	Belflower (3–2)	Reyes (0–3)	None	1,181	14–11	–
March 17	at No. 5 South Carolina		Sarge Frye Field; Columbia, SC	2–5	Bouknight (7–0)	Smalley (3–3)	Barber (5)	4,128	14–12	1–3
March 18	at No. 5 South Carolina		Sarge Frye Field	3–7	Bauer (4–0)	Cardozo (2–1)	None	3,387	14–13	1–4
March 19	at No. 5 South Carolina		Sarge Frye Field	17–8	Birch (2–0)	Collins (1–1)	None	3,848	15–13	2–4
March 24	at Arkansas		Baum Stadium; Fayetteville, AR	8–7^{11}	Birch (3–0)	McCrotty (0–4)	None	2,472	16–13	3–4
March 25	at Arkansas		Baum Stadium	8–7^{10}	Simon (3–2)	Merryman (0–1)	None	2,447	17–13	4–4
March 26	at Arkansas		Baum Stadium	7–4	Rojas (1–0)	Riethmaier (0–4)	None	1,493	18–13	5–4
March 28	Samford		McKethan Stadium	16–8	Simon (4–2)	Anderson (2–4)	None	1,370	19–13	–
March 29	Samford		McKethan Stadium	9–6	Birch (4–0)	–	–	–	20–13	–
March 31	Vanderbilt		McKethan Stadium	4–7	Yee (4–2)	Smalley (3–4)	Beal (2)	1,586	20–14	5–5

April: 13–4–1

Date	Opponent	Rank	Stadium Site	Score	Win	Loss	Save	Attendance	Overall Record	SEC Record
April 1	Vanderbilt		McKethan Stadium	5–2	Cardozo (3–1)	Cook (1–3)	None	1,322	21–14	6–5
April 2	Vanderbilt		McKethan Stadium	10–6	Simon (5–2)	Beal (2–5)	Belflower (1)	1,298	22–14	7–5
April 4	Bethune–Cookman		McKethan Stadium	15–3	Rojas (2–0)	Marrero (1–4)	None	810	23–14	–
April 5	Bethune–Cookman		McKethan Stadium	10–3	Simon (6–2)	Martin (2–3)	None	860	24–14	–
April 7	at Kentucky		Cliff Hagan Stadium; Lexington, KY	7–2	Belflower (4–2)	Webb (5–1)	None	891	25–14	8–5
April 8	at Kentucky		Cliff Hagan Stadium	18–0	Cardozo (4–1)	Michael (4–1)	Rojas (1)	315	26–14	9–5
April 9	at Kentucky		Cliff Hagan Stadium	6–6	None	None	None	559	26–14–1	9–5–1
April 12	No. 25 Stetson	No. 29	McKethan Stadium	10–3	Birch (5–0)	Wilson (3–1)	None	1,218	27–14–1	–
April 15 (1)	No. 7 LSU	No. 29	McKethan Stadium	4–10	Gomez (6–0)	Smalley (3–5)	McMurray (1)	–	27–15–1	9–6–1
April 15 (2)	No. 7 LSU	No. 29	McKethan Stadium	6–9	Tallet (8–2)	Cardozo (4–2)	None	2,327	27–16–1	9–7–1
April 16	No. 7 LSU	No. 29	McKethan Stadium	7–5	Simon (7–2)	Hodges (2–2)	None	1,629	28–16–1	10–7–1
April 19	at Jacksonville		Wolfson Park; Jacksonville, FL	9–1	Rojas (3–0)	Williams (2–3)	None	3,419	29–16–1	–
April 21	at Tennessee		Lindsey Nelson Stadium; Knoxville, TN	4–5	Bennett (8–2)	Smalley (3–6)	None	918	29–17–1	10–8–1
April 22	at Tennessee		Lindsey Nelson Stadium	8–5	Rojas (4–0)	Bertolino (4–3)	None	1,490	30–17–1	11–8–1
April 23	at Tennessee		Lindsey Nelson Stadium	10–9	–	–	–	–	31–17–1	12–8–1
April 28	No. 12 Auburn	No. 27	McKethan Stadium	5–3	Smalley (4–6)	Bean (8–2)	None	1,774	32–17–1	13–8–1
April 29	No. 12 Auburn	No. 27	McKethan Stadium	8–11^{10}	–	–	–	–	32–18–1	13–9–1
April 30	No. 12 Auburn	No. 27	McKethan Stadium	7–6	Belflower (5–3)	Bean (8–3)	None	2,612	33–18–1	14–9–1

May: 5–2

Date	Opponent	Rank	Stadium Site	Score	Win	Loss	Save	Attendance	Overall Record	SEC Record
May 5	at No. 7 Mississippi State	No. 22	Dudy Noble Field; Starkville, MS	2–20	Donovan (5–3)	Smalley (4–7)	None	6,524	33–19–1	14–10–1
May 6	at No. 7 Mississippi State	No. 22	Dudy Noble Field	9–6^{11}	Belflower (6–3)	Larson (3–3)	None	7,285	34–19–1	15–10–1
May 7	at No. 7 Mississippi State	No. 22	Dudy Noble Field	7–12	Freed (8–0)	Mosher (0–3)	Wooten (1)	4,779	34-20–1	15–11–1
May 9	South Florida	No. 24	McKethan Stadium	10–5	Rojas (5–0)	Hubbard (0–2)	Birch (3)	1,374	35–20–1	–
May 12	Georgia	No. 24	McKethan Stadium	9–1	Smalley (5–7)	Clark (7–4)	None	2,143	36–20–1	16–11–1
May 13	Georgia	No. 24	McKethan Stadium	7–6	Cardozo (5–2)	Steele (6–4)	Belflower (3)	3,217	37–20–1	17–11–1
May 14	Georgia	No. 24	McKethan Stadium	7–4	Simon (8–2)	Sharpton (3–4)	Belflower (4)	1,754	38–20–1	18–11–1

Postseason: 6–3
SEC Tournament: 3–1

Date	Opponent	Rank	Stadium Site	Score	Win	Loss	Save	Attendance	Overall Record	SECT Record
May 17	vs. (5) No. 17 Auburn	(4) No. 21	Metropolitan Stadium; Hoover, AL	7–2	Smalley (6–7)	Speigner (2–3)	None	–	39–20–1	1–0
May 18	vs. (8) Kentucky	(4) No. 21	Metropolitan Stadium	8–7	Simon (9–2)	Wade (7–7)	Belflower (5)	9,252	40–20–1	2–0
May 20	vs. (1) No. 1 South Carolina	(4) No. 21	Metropolitan Stadium	12–4	Rojas (6–0)	Whetstone (0–2)	Wiegandt (1)	3,224	41–20–1	3–0
May 21	vs. (2) No. 10 LSU	(4) No. 21	Metropolitan Stadium	6–9	Gomez (9–1)	McFarland (1–1)	Tallet (1)	5,103	41–21–1	3–1

NCAA tournament: Waco Regional: 3–2

Date	Opponent	Rank	Stadium Site	Score	Win	Loss	Save	Attendance	Overall Record	NCAAT Record
May 26	vs. (3) San José State	(2) No. 18	Baylor Ballpark; Waco, TX	1–4	Key (12–2)	Smalley (6–8)	None	2,805	41–22–1	0–1
May 27 (1)	at (1) No. 5 Baylor	(2) No. 18	Baylor Ballpark	10–1	Cardozo (6–2)	Evans (11–2)	None	3,316	42–22–1	1–1
May 27 (2)	(4) vs. Southwest Texas State	(2) No. 18	Baylor Ballpark	14–0	Simon (10–2)	Casanova (3–4)	None	3,168	43–22–1	2–1
May 28	vs. (3) San José State	(2) No. 18	Baylor Ballpark	8–7	Belflower (7–3)	Key (12–3)	None	2,847	44–22–1	3–1
May 29	vs. (3) No. 15 San José State	(2) No. 16	Baylor Ballpark	1–3	Sandler (2–2)	Smalley (6–9)	None	2,645	44–23–1	3–2

Rankings from Collegiate Baseball. All times Eastern. Retrieved from FloridaGators.com
