= 2000 Mid-Continent Conference baseball tournament =

- Teams: 6
- Format: Double-elimination
- Finals site: J. L. Johnson Stadium; Tulsa, Oklahoma
- Champions: Oral Roberts (3rd title)
- Winning coach: Sunny Golloway (3rd title)
- MVP: Eric Vandeventer (Oral Roberts)

2000 Mid-Continent Conference baseball standings
	Conf.						Overall
Team	W		L		T	PCT	W		L		T	PCT
Oral Roberts ‍†‍‡‍^{y}	26	–	1	–	0	.963	49	–	15	–	0	.766
Oakland ‍‍‍	17	–	9	–	0	.654	28	–	32	–	0	.467
Southern Utah ‍‍‍	16	–	11	–	0	.593	30	–	26	–	0	.536
Youngstown State ‍‍‍	13	–	13	–	0	.500	24	–	31	–	0	.436
Western Illinois ‍‍‍	12	–	15	–	0	.444	17	–	39	–	0	.304
Valparaiso ‍‍‍	10	–	17	–	0	.370	14	–	42	–	1	.254
Chicago State ‍‍‍	7	–	18	–	0	.280	17	–	30	–	0	.362
IUPUI ‍‍‍	4	–	21	–	0	.160	10	–	40	–	0	.200
‡ – Tournament champion y – Invited to the NCAA tournament As of June 30, 2000; Rankings from Collegiate Baseball

The 2000 Mid-Continent Conference Tournament took place from May 17 through 20. The top six regular season finishers from the regular season met in the double-elimination tournament held at J. L. Johnson Stadium on the campus of Oral Roberts University in Tulsa, Oklahoma. Oral Roberts won the tournament for the third time.

== Format and seeding ==
The top six finishers advanced to the tournament.

Team	W	L	Pct.	GB	Seed
Oral Roberts	26	1	.963	—	1
Oakland	17	9	.654	8.5	2
Southern Utah	16	11	.593	10	3
Western Illinois	13	13	.500	12.5	4
Youngstown State	12	15	.444	14	5
Valparaiso	10	17	.370	16	6
Chicago State	7	18	.280	18	—
IUPUI	4	21	.160	21	—

== Tournament ==
First round
1	Oral Roberts	5
6	Valparaiso	3
3	Southern Utah	1
4	Youngstown State	6
2	Oakland	5
5	Western Illinois	3

Second round
1	Oral Roberts	1
3	Southern Utah	6
6	Valparaiso	20
5	Western Illinois	13
4	Youngstown State	7
2	Oakland	9
1	Oral Roberts	26
4	Youngstown State	2

Third round
3	Southern Utah	20
6	Valparaiso	7
2	Oakland	1
1	Oral Roberts	20

Semifinals
3	Southern Utah	11
2	Oakland	1

Final
3	Southern Utah	4
1	Oral Roberts	8

=== Game-by-game results ===
Game	Winner	Score	Loser	Comment
1	(1) Oral Roberts	5–3	(6) Valparaiso	
2	(2) Oakland	5–3	(5) Western Illinois	
3	(4) Youngstown State	6–1	(3) Southern Utah	
4	(6) Valparaiso	20–13	(5) Western Illinois	Western Illinois eliminated
5	(3) Southern Utah	6–1	(1) Oral Roberts	
6	(2) Oakland	9–7	(4) Youngstown State	
7	(1) Oral Roberts	26–2	(4) Youngstown State	Youngstown State eliminated
8	(1) Oral Roberts	1–0	(2) Oakland	
9	(3) Southern Utah	20–7	(6) Valparaiso	Valparaiso eliminated
10	(3) Southern Utah	11–1	(2) Oakland	Oakland eliminated
11	(1) Oral Roberts	8–4	(3) Southern Utah	Oral Roberts wins Mid-Con Championship

== All-Tournament Team ==
Name	School
James Anderson	Southern Utah
Sean Boesch	Oakland
Stockton Davis	Oral Roberts
Steve Holm	Oral Roberts
Curtis Jacobsen	Southern Utah
Justin Kittrell	Southern Utah
Ryan Neill	Oral Roberts
Mark Pedersen	Valparaiso
Mike Rose	Oral Roberts
Todd Santore	Youngstown State
Kyle Sobecki	Youngstown State
Jeff Stallings	Oral Roberts
J.J. Swiatkowski	Valparaiso
Eric Vandeventer	Oral Roberts

=== Tournament Most Valuable Player ===
Eric Vandeventer of Oral Roberts was named Tournament MVP.
