= Eddy Furniss =

American baseball player (born 1975)

- First baseman
- Born: September 18, 1975 (age 50); Nacogdoches, Texas, U.S.
- Bats: Left Throws: Left
- Stats at Baseball Reference

Career highlights and awards
- Dick Howser Trophy (1998); 2× College Baseball First-Team All-American (1996, 1998); 2× College World Series champion (1996, 1997); No. 36 Retired by LSU

Member of the College

Baseball Hall of Fame
- Induction: 2010

Wilburn Edward Furniss III (born September 18, 1975) is an American former professional baseball first baseman and designated hitter. A standout college baseball player for Louisiana State University (LSU), Furniss has been inducted into the College Baseball Hall of Fame, the LSU Athletic Hall of Fame, and the Louisiana Sports Hall of Fame. He is the 10th athlete, and 2nd baseball player, in LSU history to have his number retired.

With the LSU Tigers, Furniss was a two-time College World Series champion and a two-time All-American. He won the Dick Howser Trophy as college baseball's best player in 1998, and set Southeastern Conference (SEC) records in numerous offensive categories, including home runs and runs batted in (RBIs). He was among the National Collegiate Athletic Association's all-time leaders in home runs and RBIs at the time he graduated from college.

Drafted by the Pittsburgh Pirates in 1998, Furniss played in their minor league system through 2000. He played for the Oakland Athletics organization in 2001 and the Texas Rangers organization in 2002. Unable to advance beyond Class AA, Furniss decided to retire from baseball and attend medical school. He graduated from the University of Texas Health Science Center at Houston and completed his residency at John Peter Smith Hospital. He practices family medicine in his native Nacogdoches, Texas.

== Baseball career ==
=== Amateur career ===
Furniss attended Nacogdoches High School in Nacogdoches, Texas, where he played for the school's baseball team. In his senior season, Furniss had a .430 batting average, and was named to the All-State team. He had no intention of playing college baseball, expecting to study medicine in college. Following the persistence of college coaches who tried to recruit him, Furniss agreed to continue his baseball career in college.

After graduating from high school in 1994, Furniss enrolled at Louisiana State University (LSU), where he played college baseball for the LSU Tigers baseball team in the Southeastern Conference (SEC) of the National Collegiate Athletic Association's (NCAA) Division I. Furniss batted .326 as a freshman with the LSU Tigers in 1995, and was named to the All-Tournament Team in the 1995 SEC baseball tournament. As a sophomore, Furniss was named the SEC Player of the Year, as he batted .374 and hit 26 home runs with 103 RBIs, the most in the nation. He was also named a first-team All American as a designated hitter, as the Tigers won the 1996 College World Series (CWS). In 1996, he played collegiate summer baseball in the Cape Cod Baseball League for the Yarmouth-Dennis Red Sox, where he won the league's annual all-star game home run hitting contest.

As a junior, Furniss batted .378 with 17 home runs and 77 RBIs. The Tigers repeated, winning the 1997 CWS. The SEC presented Furniss with their Sportsmanship Award after the season. Furniss sought to improve his physical shape for the 1998 season, and after losing weight, Furniss batted .403 average in 1998 with 27 doubles, three triples, 28 home runs, 85 runs scored, and 76 RBIs. He also set a career-high with 72 walks and a career-low in strikeouts with 40. He earned first-team All-America and All-SEC honors, and won the Dick Howser Trophy as the top collegiate baseball player. He was also a semifinalist for the Golden Spikes Award, though the award was won by Pat Burrell.

Furniss had a .371 batting average in his four years at LSU, and set SEC career records for hits (352), doubles (87), home runs (80), runs batted in (309), and total bases (689). At the end of his career, he was among the NCAA's all-time leaders in various offensive categories, ranking third in total bases, fourth in home runs and doubles, and fifth in RBIs.

=== Professional career ===
Selected in the 14th round of the 1997 Major League Baseball (MLB) Draft by the Minnesota Twins, Furniss opted to return to LSU for his senior season, rather than sign for the signing bonus typically given to a player selected in that round. After his senior season, Furniss was drafted by the Pittsburgh Pirates in the fourth round of the 1998 MLB draft.

Furniss made his professional debut with the Augusta GreenJackets of the Class A South Atlantic League. After a strong showing with Augusta, batting 40-for-86 (.465) with seven doubles, nine home runs, 31 RBIs and 32 runs scored in 24 games, the Pirates promoted Furniss to the Carolina Mudcats of the Class AA Southern League in mid-July, bypassing the Lynchburg Hillcats of the Class A-Advanced Carolina League. Furniss struggled in Carolina, and the Pirates demoted Furniss to Lynchburg on August 4. He batted .193 in 36 games with Lynchburg to close the season.

The Pirates assigned Furniss to Lynchburg in 1999, where he batted .261 with 23 home runs and 87 RBIs, and was honored as the Carolina League's All-Star first baseman. He also set a Hillcats franchise record for walks with 94. The Pirates sent Furniss to play in the Arizona Fall League after the 1999 regular season. He played for the Altoona Curve of the Class AA Eastern League, the Pirates' new Class AA affiliate, in 2000, where he batted .239 in 121 games played.

Signed as a free agent by the Oakland Athletics organization after the season, Furniss started the 2001 season with the Midland RockHounds of the Class AA Texas League, but was demoted to the Visalia Oaks of the Class A-Advanced California League in April. The Athletics promoted him back to Midland later in the season. Joining the Texas Rangers organization for the 2002 season, he played for the Tulsa Drillers, also in the Texas League, where he played in 26 games and batted .143.

=== Honors ===
In honor of his LSU career, Furniss has been inducted into three halls of fame; the LSU Athletic Hall of Fame in 2007, the College Baseball Hall of Fame in 2010, and the Louisiana Sports Hall of Fame in 2012. During his 2012 induction speech, Furniss quoted the character based on Moonlight Graham from Field of Dreams. Graham played in one MLB game before he retired to practice medicine. On April 22, 2016 the LSU baseball team retired Furniss' No. 36 jersey.

== Medical career ==
"When I was in high school I always planned to be a doctor and come back to Nacogdoches. The baseball was an accidental success, something I happened to be good at and so my plan was I'd do it as long as possible. I could always go back to being a doctor."

— Eddy Furniss

Furniss graduated LSU with an academic major in zoology on a pre-medical track, and grade point averages above 3.5 in each of his last three years. He took his laboratory courses during the fall semester, so they did not distract from the baseball season in the spring semester.

After the 2002 season, Furniss retired from baseball, as he promised himself he would if he found himself unable to advance beyond Class AA. He enrolled in medical school at University of Texas Health Science Center at Houston, and completed his residency at John Peter Smith Hospital in Fort Worth, Texas. Furniss practices in the Nacogdoches Medical Center, the same building where his father practices.

== Personal life ==
Furniss was raised in Nacogdoches, Texas, on a 36-acre (15 ha) ranch. His father, a medical doctor who practices family medicine, built Eddy a batting cage so that he could take 200 to 300 practice swings a day as a child.

Furniss married his high school girlfriend, Crystal, with whom he has two sons and a daughter.

== See also ==
- List of college baseball career home run leaders
