= Pete Incaviglia =

American baseball player (born 1964)

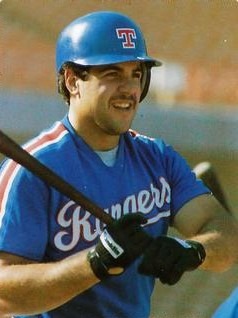

Cleburne Railroaders – No. 5
- Left fielder / Manager
- Born: April 2, 1964 (age 62); Pebble Beach, California, U.S.
- Batted: Right Threw: Right

Professional debut
- MLB: April 8, 1986, for the Texas Rangers
- NPB: April 1, 1995, for the Chiba Lotte Marines

Last appearance
- NPB: August 22, 1995, for the Chiba Lotte Marines
- MLB: September 27, 1998, for the Houston Astros

MLB statistics
- Batting average: .246
- Home runs: 206
- Runs batted in: 655

NPB statistics
- Batting average: .181
- Home runs: 10
- Runs batted in: 31
- Stats at Baseball Reference

Teams
- Texas Rangers (1986–1990); Detroit Tigers (1991); Houston Astros (1992); Philadelphia Phillies (1993–1994); Chiba Lotte Marines (1995); Philadelphia Phillies (1996); Baltimore Orioles (1996–1997); New York Yankees (1997); Detroit Tigers (1998); Houston Astros (1998)

Member of the National College

Baseball Hall of Fame
- Induction: 2007

Peter Joseph Incaviglia (born April 2, 1964) is an American professional baseball coach and former left fielder who is currently the manager for the Cleburne Railroaders of the American Association of Professional Baseball. He played in Major League Baseball (MLB) for 12 seasons (1986–1998), for six different big league teams, and also spent one year in Nippon Professional Baseball (NPB). Incaviglia was drafted in the first round (eighth overall pick) by the Montreal Expos in the 1985 Major League Baseball draft out of Oklahoma State University, then was traded later that same year to the Texas Rangers. He debuted in the major leagues on April 8, 1986, without having spent any time in the minor leagues. His last MLB game was on September 27, 1998.

Incaviglia was noted for his power hitting ability as well as his tendency to strike out. During his MLB career, he struck out 1,277 times, while leading the league twice, 1986 and 1988. Incaviglia owns several single-season National Collegiate Athletic Association (NCAA) records, including home runs (HR) (48) and runs batted in (RBI) (143).

== College career ==
At Oklahoma State, Incaviglia became one of the greatest power hitters in College Baseball history. In three seasons he amassed 100 home runs (in 213 games) and had a career slugging percentage of .915. In 1983, he played collegiate summer baseball with the Wareham Gatemen of the Cape Cod Baseball League. In his junior season, he hit 48 home runs and finished the year with an NCAA record 1.140 slugging percentage. He also led Oklahoma State to the College World Series in each of his three seasons. He is still the NCAA Division I baseball all-time leader in home runs in a career and home runs in a season.

He was elected to the College Baseball Hall of Fame in 2007.

== Major League career ==
Incaviglia's rookie season came in 1986. Drafted by the Montreal Expos in 1985, he refused to play a day in the minor leagues and was later traded to the Texas Rangers in exchange for Bob Sebra and Jim Anderson. The Rangers would grant the request and make him the 15th player in Major League history to debut in the majors without ever playing any minor league ball since the amateur draft began in 1965. He had the tenth most home runs in the league (30) and set a Rangers club record, but also struck out the most times in 1986 (185), currently holding 44th place (through 2019 season) on the all-time single-season strikeout record. His rookie season set a standard he would be unable to match again through the rest of his career. In 1987, his home run output decreased by three, but his batting average climbed 21 points, had a better slugging percentage, and cut down his strikeouts by 17.

Incaviglia hit at least 20 home runs yearly in his first five seasons, all with Texas. His playing time and production dropped thereafter in single seasons with Detroit and Houston, however his career received a boost when he was signed by the Philadelphia Phillies before the 1993 season. He and fellow outfielder Jim Eisenreich were key acquisitions for the team that would go on to win the division and reach the World Series (one year after finishing in last place). In just 368 at-bats, Incaviglia hit 24 home runs and drove in a career-best 89 runs. He also posted career highs in OPS (.848) and WAR (2.9).

Incaviglia batted .234 with 16 home runs and 42 RBI in 99 games with the Phillies in 1996 until he was acquired along with Todd Zeile by the Orioles on August 29 of that year in a transaction that was completed when Calvin Maduro and Garrett Stephenson were sent to Philadelphia on September 3 and 4 respectively. He was designated for assignment by the Orioles on July 14, 1997, after hitting .246 with five homers and 12 RBI in 48 games.

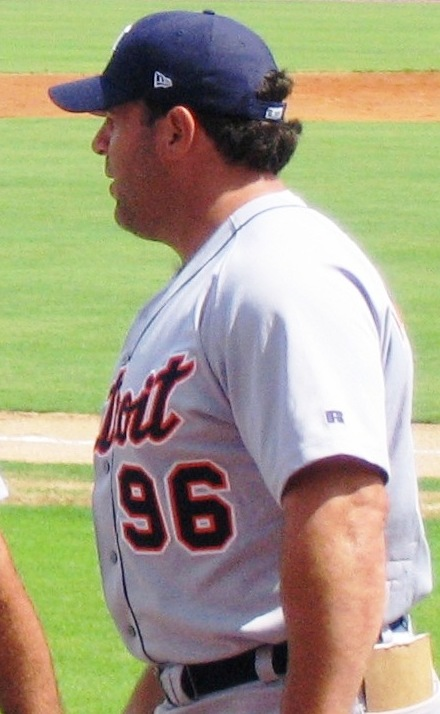
Incaviglia as a coach in the Tigers organization in 2005

== Pete Incaviglia Rule ==
As a result of the Expos trading Incaviglia immediately after signing him, Major League Baseball instituted a rule whereby a team cannot trade a drafted player until he has been under contract to the club for at least one calendar year. This was known as the Pete Incaviglia Rule. The rule was changed during the 2015 season, allowing teams to trade drafted players the day after the World Series concluded.

== Coaching and managing career ==
Incaviglia was the hitting coach for the Erie SeaWolves, the Detroit Tigers Class AA affiliate in the Eastern League, for the three seasons, but was dismissed at the end of the 2006 season.

Incaviglia was announced as the first manager of the Grand Prairie AirHogs on October 24, 2007. The AirHogs began play in May 2008 in the American Association of Independent Professional Baseball and reached the Southern Division playoffs in his first season as their manager. After five seasons as manager of the Laredo Lemurs—even winning the 2015 American Association championship—he returned to the AirHogs as hitting coach after the Lemurs shut down operations prior to the 2017 season.

On November 6, 2017, Incaviglia was announced as the second manager of the Sugar Land Skeeters of the Atlantic League of Professional Baseball (ALPB), a position vacated by Gary Gaetti.

On January 28, 2021, Incaviglia was hired to be the manager for the Tri-City ValleyCats of the Frontier League. On October 12, 2023, Incaviglia and the Tri-City ValleyCats announced a mutual decision to part ways after three seasons.

On November 8, 2023, Incaviglia was named manager of the Cleburne Railroaders of the American Association of Professional Baseball league.

== Grimsley affidavit ==
On December 20, 2007, Incaviglia was named in Jason Grimsley's unsealed affidavit as an alleged user of amphetamines.

== See also ==
- List of baseball players who went directly to Major League Baseball
