= 2000 Big South Conference baseball tournament =

- Teams: 8
- Format: Double-elimination
- Finals site: Charles Watson Stadium; Conway, South Carolina
- Champions: Liberty (3rd title)
- Winning coach: Dave Pastors (2nd title)
- MVP: Jason Suitt (Liberty)

2000 Big South Conference baseball standings
	Conf.						Overall
Team	W		L		T	PCT	W		L		T	PCT
Liberty ‍†‍‡‍^{y}	14	–	5	–	0	.737	36	–	23	–	0	.610
Charleston Southern ‍‍‍	14	–	7	–	0	.667	31	–	31	–	1	.500
Radford ‍‍‍	12	–	7	–	0	.632	28	–	24	–	0	.538
Coastal Carolina ‍‍‍	11	–	10	–	0	.524	34	–	24	–	0	.586
Elon ‍‍‍	11	–	10	–	0	.524	33	–	25	–	0	.569
Winthrop ‍‍‍	7	–	14	–	0	.333	30	–	33	–	0	.476
UNC Asheville ‍‍‍	7	–	14	–	0	.333	26	–	32	–	0	.448
High Point ‍‍‍	6	–	15	–	0	.286	22	–	36	–	1	.381
† – Conference champion ‡ – Tournament champion y – Invited to the NCAA tournament As of June 30, 2000; Rankings from Collegiate Baseball

The 2000 Big South Conference baseball tournament was the postseason baseball tournament for the Big South Conference, held from May 17 through 20 at Charles Watson Stadium, home field of regular season champion Coastal Carolina in Conway, South Carolina. All eight teams participated in the double-elimination tournament. The champion, Liberty, won the title for the third time, and second in three seasons, and earned an invitation to the 2000 NCAA Division I baseball tournament.

== Format ==
All teams qualified for the tournament. The teams were seeded one through eight based on conference winning percentage and played a double-elimination tournament.

Team	W	L	Pct.	GB	Seed
Liberty	14	5	.737	—	1
Charleston Southern	14	7	.667	1	2
Radford	12	7	.632	2	3
Coastal Carolina	11	10	.542	4	4
Elon	11	10	.542	4	5
Winthrop	7	14	.333	8	6
UNC Asheville	7	14	.333	8	7
High Point	6	15	.286	9	8

== Bracket and results ==
Upper round 1	Upper round 2	Upper final	Final
1	Liberty	7
8	High Point	4
1	Liberty	5
4	Coastal Carolina	2
4	Coastal Carolina	1
5	Elon	0
1	Liberty	4
6	Winthrop	2
3	Radford	5
6	Winthrop	7
6	Winthrop	8^{13}
2	Charleston Southern	7
2	Charleston Southern	5
7	UNC Asheville	4	1	Liberty	3	—
2	Charleston Southern	0	—
Lower round 1	Lower round 2	Lower round 3	Lower final
2	Charleston Southern	6
8	High Point	5	8	High Point	2	6	Winthrop	1
5	Elon	4	2	Charleston Southern	3	2	Charleston Southern	9
7	UNC Asheville	1
4	Coastal Carolina	0
3	Radford	1	7	UNC Asheville	3
7	UNC Asheville	2

== All-Tournament Team ==
Name	School
Keith Butler	Liberty
Matt Coenen	Charleston Southern
Richard Gommersall	Charleston Southern
Todd Leathers	Winthrop
Ted Malikowski	Charleston Southern
Brandon Powell	Coastal Carolina
Patrick Siemers	Charleston Southern
Jason Suitt	Liberty
Jay Sullenger	Liberty
Josh Ury	Winthrop
Larry York	Liberty
Fred Wray	Radford

=== Most Valuable Player ===
Jason Suitt was named Tournament Most Valuable Player. Suitt was a pitcher for Liberty.
