= Tommy White (baseball) =

American baseball player (born 2003)

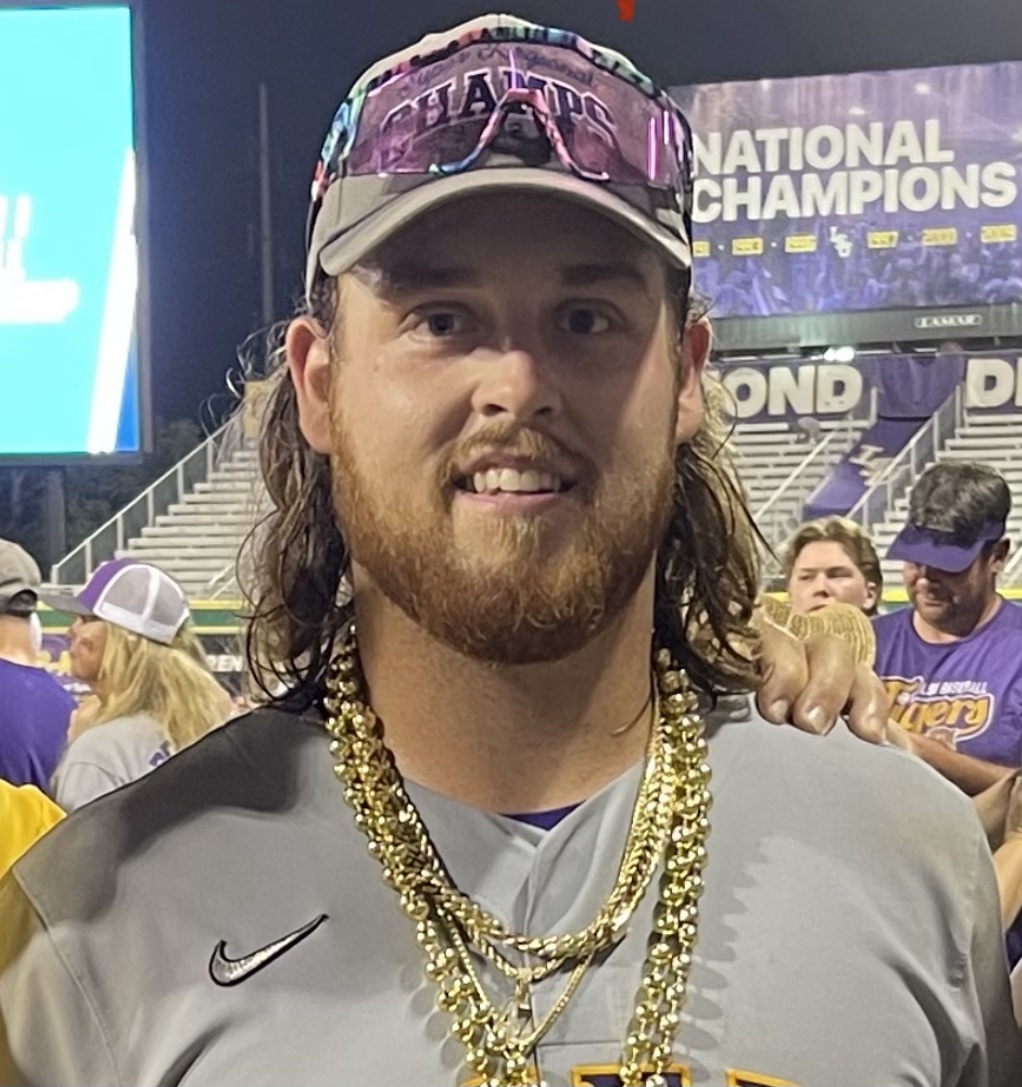
- White with the LSU Tigers in 2023

Athletics – No. 47
- First baseman / Third baseman
- Born: March 2, 2003 (age 23); St. Petersburg, Florida, U.S.
- Bats: Right Throws: Right

MLB debut
- July 17, 2026, for the Athletics

MLB statistics (through 2026 season)
- Batting average: .254
- Home runs: 3
- Runs batted in: 10
- Stats at Baseball Reference

Teams
- Athletics (2026–present)

Thomas Anthony White (born March 2, 2003) nicknamed "Tommy Tanks", is an American professional baseball first baseman and third baseman for the Athletics of Major League Baseball (MLB). He made his MLB debut in 2026.

== Early life ==
White grew up in St. Pete Beach, Florida and initially attended Calvary Christian High School. As a junior, he batted .444 with four home runs and 18 runs batted in (RBIs) in 11 games before the season was cut short due to the coronavirus pandemic. He transferred to IMG Academy in Bradenton, Florida prior to his senior year. White batted .378 and was named an All-American in his only season at IMG. He was the No. 1 ranked third base draft prospect coming out of high school in 2021, and No. 18 overall.

== College career ==
White enrolled at North Carolina State University to play college baseball for the NC State Wolfpack. He batted .588 with nine home runs in his first eight collegiate games. White set records for the most home runs by a NC State player, and the most in a single season by a freshman in NCAA history. On May 28, 2022, White hit his fourth home run in two games at the ACC Tournament, marking his 27th of the season, and broke Todd Green's 1990 freshman home run record (26). White was a consensus freshman of the year (ACC, Collegiate Baseball, Baseball America, NCBWA, ABCA), and a 1st Team All American. White was a 2022 Dick Howser Trophy semifinalist, and a Golden Spikes Award finalist. After his freshman campaign, he entered the NCAA transfer portal.

White transferred to Louisiana State University (LSU) to play for the LSU Tigers. In his first season with the Tigers, he batted .377 with 24 doubles, 24 home runs, 64 runs scored and led the nation with 105 RBIs. White was named a consensus All-American for a second straight year. LSU won the 2023 national championship, and White was selected for the 2023 College World Series All-Tournament Team. In 2024, he batted .330 with 24 home runs and 70 RBIs, and was named second team All-America as well as All-Southeastern Conference as a junior. White was a 2023 Golden Spikes Award Semifinalist, and a 2023 and 2024 Dick Howser Trophy Semifinalist.

White finished his college career ranked No. 8 in NCAA Division I history for career home runs with 75. He was only the fourth player in NCAA Division I history to reach the 75-home run mark in three seasons (2022–24). The others are Pete Incaviglia of Oklahoma State (1983–85), Frank Fazzini of Florida State (1983–85), and George Canale of Virginia Tech (1984–86). White is also the fourth player in NCAA Division I history to hit 20+ home runs in three separate seasons. The others are Incaviglia, Canale and Todd Greene of Georgia Southern (1990–91, 1993).

== Professional career ==
The Oakland Athletics drafted White with the first pick of the second round (40th overall) in the 2024 Major League Baseball draft. On July 23, 2024, White signed with the Athletics for a $3 million signing bonus.

White was assigned to the Stockton Ports of the Single-A California League to begin his professional career. Over 25 games, he hit .224 with two home runs and 14 RBI. To open the 2025 season, White was assigned to the Lansing Lugnuts of the High-A Midwest League. In July, he was promoted to the Midland RockHounds of the Double-A Texas League. He was selected to represent the Athletics (alongside Gage Jump) at the 2025 All-Star Futures Game at Truist Park.

White began the 2026 season with the Midland RockHounds before being promoted to the Triple-A Las Vegas Aviators in April. Between the two affiliates, he slashed .303/.353/.465 with 10 home runs and 64 RBI in 76 games. On July 17, 2026, White was selected to the Athletics' 40-man roster and promoted to the major leagues for the first time. On August 16, White hit his first career home run off of Peyton Gray of the Texas Rangers.
