= 2000 Ivy League Baseball Championship Series =

2000 Ivy League baseball tournament
- Teams: 2
- Format: Best of three series
- Finals site: Bill Clarke Field; Princeton, NJ
- Champions: Princeton (2nd title)
- Winning coach: Scott Bradley (1st title)

2000 Ivy League baseball standings
	Conf.				Overall
Team	W		L	PCT	W		L	PCT
Lou Gehrig
Princeton ^{x}‍‍‡‍^{y}	13	–	7	.650	24	–	20	.545
Cornell ‍‍‍	11	–	9	.550	15	–	24	.385
Penn ‍‍‍	9	–	11	.450	20	–	21	.488
Columbia ‍‍‍	6	–	14	.300	11	–	34	.244
Red Rolfe
Dartmouth ^{x}‍‍‍	17	–	3	.850	29	–	14	.674
Brown ‍‍‍	11	–	9	.550	23	–	24	.489
Harvard ‍‍‍	10	–	10	.500	18	–	25	.419
Yale ‍‍‍	3	–	17	.150	13	–	31	.295
x – Division champion ‡ – Championship Series champion y – Invited to the NCAA tournament As of June 30, 2000; Rankings from Collegiate Baseball

The 2000 Ivy League Baseball Championship Series took place at Bill Clarke Field in Princeton, New Jersey on May 6, 2000. The series matched the regular season champions of each of the league's two divisions. Princeton, the winner of the series, claimed their second title and the Ivy League's automatic berth in the 2000 NCAA Division I baseball tournament. It was Princeton's fifth appearance in the Championship Series, all of which were consecutive.

Dartmouth made their first appearance in the Championship Series.

== Results ==
Finals
Dartmouth	2	3	—
Princeton	5	4	—
