= 2000 Southeastern Conference baseball tournament =

- Teams: 8
- Format: Two pools of four-team double elimination
- Finals site: Hoover Metropolitan Stadium; Hoover, Alabama
- Champions: LSU (6th title)
- Winning coach: Skip Bertman (6th title)
- MVP: Wally Pontiff (LSU)
- Attendance: 85,653

2000 Southeastern Conference baseball standings
	Conf.				Overall
Team	W		L	PCT	W		L	PCT
Eastern
No. 9 South Carolina ^{x}‍†‍‍^{y}	25	–	5	.833	53	–	8	.869
No. 17 Florida ‍‍‍^{y}	18	–	11	.621	44	–	23	.657
Georgia ‍‍‍	14	–	15	.483	32	–	26	.552
Kentucky ‍‍‍	12	–	16	.429	38	–	20	.655
Tennessee ‍‍‍	10	–	18	.357	40	–	23	.635
Vanderbilt ‍‍‍	5	–	24	.172	21	–	33	.389
Western
No. 1 LSU ^{x}‍‍‡‍^{y}	19	–	10	.655	52	–	17	.754
No. 15 Mississippi State ‍‍‍^{y}	17	–	10	.630	39	–	17	.696
No. 25 Auburn ‍‍‍^{y}	17	–	13	.567	41	–	20	.672
No. 27 Alabama ‍‍‍^{y}	16	–	14	.533	41	–	24	.631
Ole Miss ‍‍‍	12	–	17	.414	30	–	25	.545
Arkansas ‍‍‍	8	–	20	.286	24	–	30	.444
x – Division champion † – Conference champion ‡ – Tournament champion y – Invited to the NCAA tournament As of June 30, 2000; Rankings from Collegiate Baseball

The 2000 Southeastern Conference baseball tournament was held at Hoover Metropolitan Stadium in Hoover, Alabama from May 17 through 21. LSU defeated Florida in the championship game, earning the Southeastern Conference's automatic bid to the NCAA tournament. LSU would go on to win the national championship at the College World Series in Omaha, NE, their fifth national championship in 10 seasons.

== Regular-season results ==
Eastern Division
Team	W	L	Pct	GB	Seed
South Carolina	25	5	.833	–	1
Florida	18	11	.621	6.5	4
Georgia	14	15	.483	10.5	7
Kentucky	12	16	.429	12	8
Tennessee	10	18	.357	14	—
Vanderbilt	5	24	.172	19.5	--

Western Division
Team	W	L	Pct	GB	Seed
LSU	19	10	.655	--	2
Mississippi State	17	10	.630	1	3
Auburn	17	13	.567	2.5	5
Alabama	16	14	.533	3.5	6
Ole Miss	12	17	.414	7	--
Arkansas	8	20	.286	10.5	--

== Tournament ==
First round
5	Auburn	2
4	Florida	7
8	Kentucky	6
1	South Carolina	4
5	Auburn	4
1	South Carolina	11
6	Alabama	9
3	Mississippi State	3
7	Georgia	3
2	LSU	11
3	Mississippi State	0
7	Georgia	5

Second round
4	Florida	8
8	Kentucky	7
1	South Carolina	12
8	Kentucky	5
6	Alabama	12
2	LSU	18
7	Georgia	4
6	Alabama	12

Semifinals
4	Florida	12	-
1	South Carolina	4	-
2	LSU	6	-
6	Alabama	5	-

Finals
4	Florida	6
2	LSU	9

- Vanderbilt, Ole Miss, Arkansas and Tennessee did not make the tournament.

== All-Tournament Team ==
Position	Player	School
1B	Brad Hawpe	LSU
2B	Sam Bozanich	Alabama
3B	Blair Barbier	LSU
SS	Drew Meyer	South Carolina
C	Kelley Gulledge	Alabama
OF	Wally Pontiff	LSU
OF	Cedrick Harris	LSU
OF	Tim Olson	Florida
DH	Kurt Keene	Florida
P	Mike Smalley	Florida
P	Brian Tallet	LSU
MVP	Wally Pontiff	LSU

== See also ==
- College World Series
- NCAA Division I Baseball Championship
- Southeastern Conference baseball tournament
