= John Sessions Stadium =

Baseball park at Jacksonville University

- Interactive map of John Sessions Stadium
- Location: Jacksonville, FL, United States
- Coordinates: 30.351558°N 81.608006°W
- Capacity: 1,500
- Scoreboard: Electronic
- Field size: 340 ft. (lines), 375 ft. (gaps), 405 ft. (CF)

Construction
- Renovated: 2008

Tenant
- Jacksonville University Dolphins baseball

John Sessions Stadium is a baseball venue located on the campus of Jacksonville University in Jacksonville, Florida, United States. It is home to the Jacksonville Dolphins baseball team, a member of the Division I Atlantic Sun Conference. The stadium has a capacity of 1,500 people. It is named after John F. Sessions, a benefactor of the university.

In 2008, a new scoreboard, entrance, and backstop were added to the field.

== See also ==
- List of NCAA Division I baseball venues
