= Jason Scobie =

American former professional baseball (born 1979)

- Pitcher
- Born: September 1, 1979 (age 46); Toledo, Ohio, U.S.
- Batted: Right Threw: Right

KBO debut
- 2007, for the Kia Tigers

Last KBO appearance
- 2008, for the Woori Heroes

KBO statistics
- Win–loss record: 10–15
- Earned run average: 4.85
- Strikeouts: 83
- Stats at Baseball Reference

Teams
- Kia Tigers (2007); Woori Heroes (2008)

Jason Scobie (born September 1, 1979) is an American former professional baseball player. He pitched for the Kia Tigers and Woori Heroes of the KBO League.

== Minor league career ==
Scobie made his breakthrough with New York Mets affiliated minor league team Brooklyn Cyclones, with an ERA of 0.89 over 18 games. Over six years in the minors, Scobie maintained a 3.24 ERA and amassed 440 strikeouts. Prior to signing with the Kia Tigers in 2007, Scobie pitched for the Toronto Blue Jays’ Triple-A affiliate in Syracuse, as well as the Norfolk Tides. While on the Tides, he led the International League in victories and tied the Tides franchise record with 15 wins. Scobie, then 27, appeared in seven games for Syracuse, including three starts, and had a 1-2 record with a 3.18 ERA in 17 innings pitched. Kia officials said they liked Scobie's control on breaking pitches.
