= Brad Cresse =

- Catcher
- Born: July 31, 1978 (age 47); Long Beach, California, U.S.
- Bats: Right Throws: Right
- Stats at Baseball Reference

Career highlights and awards
- Johnny Bench Award (2000)

Bradley Garrett Cresse (born July 31, 1978) is an American former professional baseball catcher. He attended Los Alamitos High School and Marina High School, where he was recognized as one of the better high school baseball players in Orange County. He then attended Louisiana State University (LSU), where he played college baseball for the LSU Tigers. As a senior, Cresse won the Johnny Bench Award, given to the top collegiate catcher.

Cresse was drafted by the Arizona Diamondbacks, and played in minor league baseball from 2000 through 2006, when he retired. He did not reach Major League Baseball.

== Career ==
Cresse attended Los Alamitos High School in Los Alamitos, California. As a junior, he had a .433 batting average and 11 home runs, resulting in his being named to the All-Orange County second team. He transferred to Marina High School in Huntington Beach, California for his senior year.

Cresse committed to attend Louisiana State University (LSU) to play college baseball for the LSU Tigers baseball team. As a result, teams shied away from drafting Cresse in the early rounds of the 1996 Major League Baseball draft. The Dodgers selected Cresse in the 34th round. He rejected an offer from the Dodgers, opting not to sign a professional contract and instead fulfill his commitment to LSU.

As a sophomore, Cresse hit 29 home runs and recorded 90 runs batted in (RBIs). After the 1997 season, he played collegiate summer baseball with the Chatham A's of the Cape Cod Baseball League. A broken bone in his right hand limited his performance during his junior year. As a senior, he won the Johnny Bench Award as the top collegiate catcher and was a member of the 2000 College World Series winner LSU Tigers.

Cresse went undrafted in the 1999 Major League Baseball draft. He was drafted by the Arizona Diamondbacks in the fifth round (159th overall) of the 2000 Major League Baseball draft. He played in the minor league systems of the Diamondbacks, reaching the Tucson Sidewinders of the Class AAA Pacific Coast League in 2003. After he was released by the Diamondbacks, he played in the organizations of the St. Louis Cardinals and Los Angeles Dodgers before retiring in 2006.

== Personal ==
Cresse is the son of Mark Cresse, a former bullpen coach for the Dodgers. Brad traveled with his father to the Dodgers' training facility in Vero Beach, Florida, when the Dodgers trained there in spring training.

Tommy Lasorda is his godfather. Lasorda begged the Dodgers to draft Cresse in 1996, similar to how he convinced the Dodgers to draft Mike Piazza, also his godson, in 1988.
